= Željko Šašić =

Serbian turbo-folk singer (born 1969)

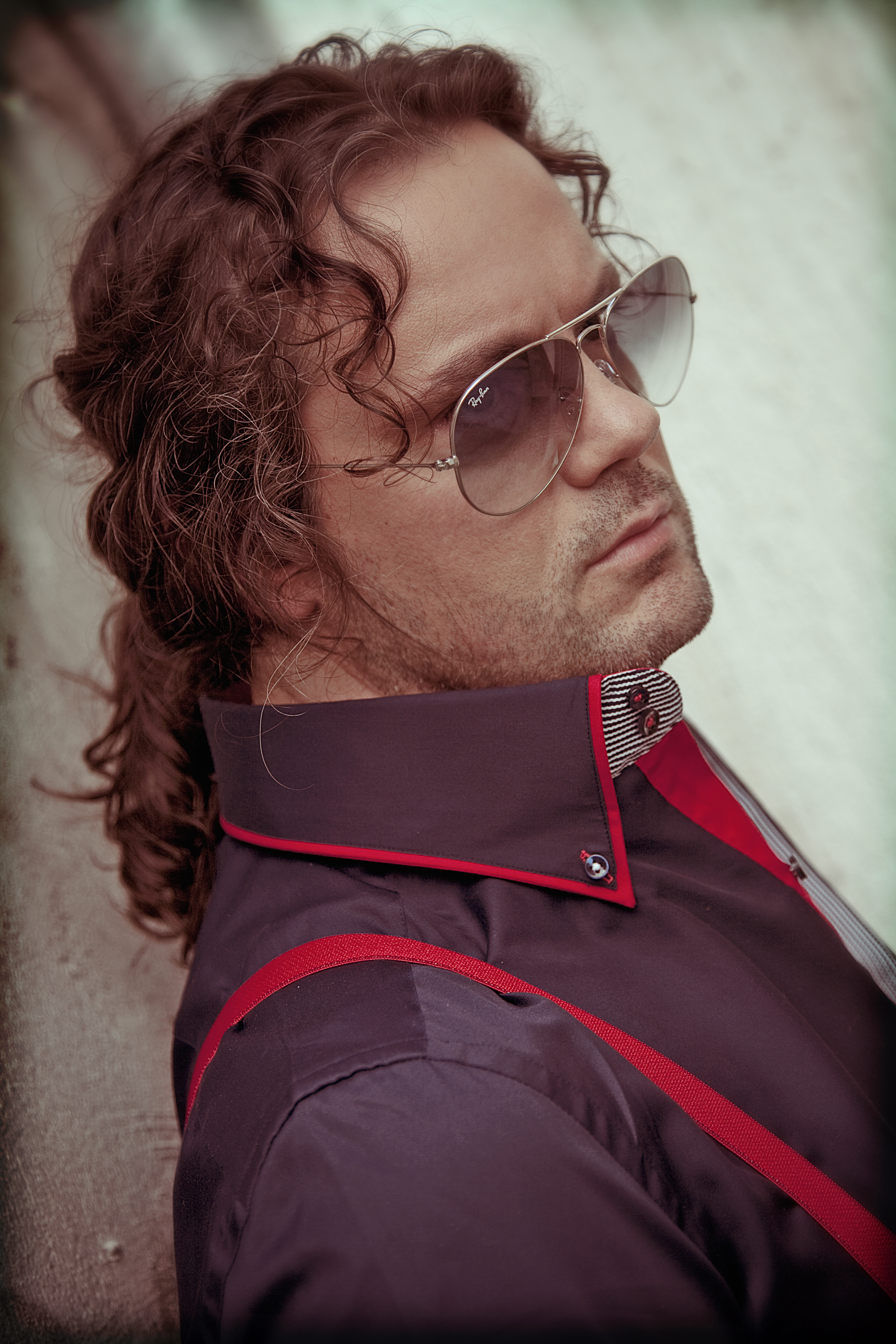
- Željko Šašić in 2009

Background information
- Also known as: Žeki
- Born: Željko Šašić; 31 October 1969 (age 56); Zemun, SFR Yugoslavia
- Genres: Turbo Folk music, Pop music
- Occupations: Singer, musician
- Instrument: Guitar
- Years active: 1994–present
- Labels: Lucky Sound, PGP RTS, City Records, Grand Production, JVP Vertrieb AG, Best Records, SKYMUSIC
- Spouse: Sonja Šašić (married 1994-2007)
- Website: instagram.com/zeljkosasic.official/

Željko "Žeki" Šašić (Serbian Cyrillic: Жељко Шашић; born 31 October 1969) is a Serbian turbo-folk singer and musician. Active since 1994, he has released eight studio albums and become one of the prominent figures in Serbian folk music. In late 2013, he competed in the first season of the Serbian version of Your Face Sounds Familiar. After the 12 weeks, he claimed 7th place, but was a public favourite, with a wide spectre of enjoyed performances as Aca Lukas, Bijelo Dugme, Riblja Čorba, Snežana Babić Sneki and many more.

== Early life and career ==
Željko Šašić was born on 31 October 1969 in Zemun, Belgrade, then part of SFR Yugoslavia. He began his professional music career in 1994 with the release of his debut album Gori more, recorded with the Futa band and released by Lucky Sound.

The album's title track "Gori more" became an immediate hit, along with other songs including "A tebe nema," "Crna ženo," and "Ima dana i kafana." The album also featured a notable duet with Ceca Ražnatović titled "Ko na grani jabuka," which achieved significant success.

== Musical career ==
=== 1995-1999: Early success ===
In 1995, Šašić released his second album Na istoj talasnoj dužini, again with the Futa band. The album contained eight songs, with "Ti lutko moja" and "Podočnjaci" becoming club favorites. The song "Voli me, voli" showed his versatility by incorporating rock elements, which had been his initial musical preference.

In 1996, Šašić began collaborating with composer and lyricist Dragan Brajović Braja and signed with PGP RTS. This partnership resulted in his third album Dve rane, which included the ballads "Ne bacaj ruže majko" and "Metak," both of which received music videos. The album also featured a successful duet with Dragana Mirković titled "Oči pune tuge," which became one of the most played songs on radio stations across Serbia and the region.

His fourth album Ona je priča života moga (1997) was marked by the title track written by Dragan Brajović and Zlaja Timotić. In 1999, he released Zaboravi me, continuing his string of successful albums.

=== 2000-2012: International expansion and hiatus ===
The album Neko drugi (2000) was released for the Yugoslav market by Best Records and internationally by Austrian label JVP Vertrieb AG. Besides ten new songs, it included his greatest hits such as "Gori more", "Metak", "Magla", and his duets with Ceca and Dragana Mirković. The song "Osmi dan u nedelji" by Greek musician Jorgos Alkaios achieved particular success.

In 2001, City Records released a compilation album The Best Of featuring twenty of his biggest hits. His seventh studio album 007 (2003) included "Meni dobra si", written by Željko Joksimović and Marina Tucaković. After this release, Šašić took a nine-year hiatus from recording albums.

In 2006, Šašić released the single "Bravo za nas", marking his return to the music scene. The 2009 hit "Mali je ovo grad" became one of his signature songs. His eighth studio album, Još kunem se u nas, was released in 2012.

== Television career ==
=== Your Face Sounds Familiar (2013) and Your Face Sounds Familiar All Stars (2019) ===
From October to December 2013, Šašić participated in the first season of Tvoje lice zvuči poznato (Your Face Sounds Familiar), broadcast on TV Prva.

During the competition, Šašić gained widespread acclaim for his versatile performances. His imitation of Aca Lukas was particularly successful, winning the fourth episode and earning €1,000 for children's oncology charity. Lukas himself praised the performance, calling it "šmekerski" (cool/slick).

Other notable performances included imitations of Željko Bebek (Bijelo Dugme), members of Riblja Čorba, Snežana Babić Sneki, and Zvonko Bogdan. Despite finishing 7th overall, fellow contestants including Nenad Knežević Knez, Aleksa Jelić, and Goca Tržan expressed disappointment that he didn't reach the finals, with Knez stating that Šašić's "character and work were one of the essential imitations of this show."

Šašić made his return to "Tvoje lice zvuči poznato" in 2019, competing in the fifth All Stars season. This special edition featured contestants from previous seasons competing as pairs. Šašić was teamed with Knez, forming Team 5.

Throughout the season, Šašić showcased his imitation skills once more, with their team achieving considerable success. Team 5 ultimately placed second in the season finale.

=== Other television appearances ===
Šašić has appeared on various programs on Radio Television of Serbia (RTS), including "Na večeri kod" (2022) and "Leto u Srbiji."

== Musical style and influence ==
Šašić is recognized as a prominent figure in the Serbian turbo-folk genre, which emerged in the 1990s as a fusion of traditional Serbian folk music with contemporary pop and electronic elements. His work is situated within the broader context of newly composed folk music that has been extensively studied by ethnomusicologists.

== Personal life ==
Šašić was married to Sonja Šašić from 1994 to 2007. They have one daughter together, Sofija Šašić. After their divorce, Sonja married fellow turbo-folk singer Aca Lukas, which added a layer of public interest when Šašić performed as Lukas on Your Face Sounds Familiar in 2013.

== Discography ==
=== Studio albums ===
- Gori more (1994, Lucky Sound)
- Na istoj talasnoj dužini (1995, Lucky Sound)
- Dve rane (1996, PGP RTS)
- Ona je priča života moga (1997, PGP RTS)
- Zaboravi me (1999)
- Neko drugi (2000, Best Records/JVP Vertrieb AG)
- 007 (2003, City Records)

=== Compilation albums ===
- The Best Of (2001, City Records)
- Grand Super Hitovi N° 23 - pesma Mali je ovo grad (2009, Grand Production)
- Još kunem se u nas (2012, Grand Production)

=== Notable singles ===
- Кафанска (2010, Grand Production)
- Равна Линија (2012)
- Насамо (2014)
- Паклена је ноћ (2015, City Records)
- На моју душу (2015)
- Театар (2021, SKYMUSIC)
- Животна (2021, SKYMUSIC)
- Она је прича живота мога (2021, SKYMUSIC)

=== Duets and collaborations ===
- Ко на грани јабука (1994) Ceca
- Само једном се воли (1995) Мајом Николић
- Очи пуне туге (1996) са Драганом Мирковић
- После свега са Елом Би (обрада песме Виво пер леи Андрее Бочелија)
- Приђи приђи (2008) са Романом Панић
- Ко ће сада да ти брани (2020) са Милицом Атанацковић

== Digital presence ==
As of 2024, Šašić maintains an active presence on streaming platforms, with over 70,400 monthly listeners on Spotify. His music is also available on Apple Music and other international platforms. He maintains an official Instagram account and YouTube channel

== See also ==
- Turbo-folk
- Your Face Sounds Familiar
- Music of Serbia
