= Tvoje lice zvuči poznato (Serbian TV series) season 5 =

Tvoje lice zvuči poznato
- Season 5
- Presented by: Marija Kilibarda
- Judges: Uroš Đurić; Dušan Alagić; Dubravka Mijatović guest judges
- No. of contestants: 10
- Winners: Ivan Kurtić; Ivana Peters
- Runners-up: Željko Šašić; Knez

Release
- Original network: Prva Srpska Televizija
- Original release: 4 October – 20 December 2019

Season chronology
- ← Previous; Season 4

Tvoje lice zvuči poznato All Stars (Serbian Cyrillic: Твоје лице звучи познато; Macedonian: Твоето лице звучи познато) is the first All Stars season and fifth season overall of the Serbian talent show Tvoje lice zvuči poznato, which is based on the Spanish series Your Face Sounds Familiar. It aired between October 4 and December 20, 2019. It's also the first edition of the popular format in which contestants from the previous seasons compete as teams of two contestants from the same season.

== Format ==
The show challenges celebrities (singers and actors) to perform as different iconic music artists every week, which are chosen by the show's "Randomiser". They are then judged by the panel of celebrity judges including Uroš Đurić, Dušan Alagić and Dubravka Mijatović. Each week, one celebrity guest judge joins Uroš, Dušan and Dubravka to make up the complete judging panel. Each celebrity gets transformed into a different singer each week, and performs an iconic song and dance routine well known by that particular singer. The 'randomiser' can choose any older or younger artist available in the machine, or even a singer of the opposite sex, or a deceased singer. Ten contestants from the previous seasons are grouped in five teams. The winner of each episode is a team, not contestant. Winner of the whole season is a team, too. Winner of each episode wins €1000, and winner of whole show wins €25000. All money goes to charity of winner's own choice. The show lasts 12 weeks.

=== Voting ===
The contestants are awarded points from the judges (and each other) based on their singing, Acting and dance routines. Judges give points from 2 to 12, with the exception of 11. After that, each contestant gives 5 points to a fellow contestant of their choice (known as "Bonus" points). All that points will be summed up for each team, and the best team will be winner of the episode. In week 11 (semi-final week) and in week 12 (final week), viewers also vote via text messages. In week 11 (semi-final), public votes transformed into points have added to judges' votes for semifinal week, and best team is winner of semifinal. In final week, judges will not vote - team with most public vote will win the show.

== Contestants ==
Team	Celebrity	Noatability	Previous appearance		Episode(s) won	Total score	Result
Team	Celebrity	Noatability	Original series	Original placement	Episode(s) won	Total score	Result
1	Ana Kokić	Singer	Series 1	Winner	4th	730	3rd
1	Aleksa Jelić	Singer, ballet dancer and TV presenter	Series 1	3rd place	5th	730	3rd
2	Dragan Kojić Keba	Singer	Series 2	9th	10th	658	4th
2	Katarina Bogićević	Actress and former Ja imam talenat! contestant	Series 2	3rd	3rd	658	4th
3	Ivana Peters	Former Tap 011 and Negative singer	Series 3	5th place	8th	804	Winners
3	Ivan Kurtić	Singer and Pinkove Zvezde winner	Series 3	Winner	9th, Semi-final	804	Winners
4	Ivan Paunić	Basketball Player	Series 4	8th place	6th	632	5th
4	Edita Aradinović	Former Ministarke singer	Series 4	3rd place	2nd	632	5th
5	Knez	Singer	Series 1	5th place	7th	730	2nd
5	Željko Šašić	Singer	Series 1	7th place	1st	730	2nd

== Series overview ==
=== Week 1 (October 4) ===
- Guest Judge: Goca Tržan
- Winner: Željko Šašić (team 5)

Order	Contestant	Performing as	Song	Points (judges and contestants)					Total	Result
Order	Contestant	Performing as	Song	Goca Tržan	Duda Mijatović	Uroš Đurić	Dušan Alagić	Bonus	Total	Result
1	Ana Kokić	Pink	"Walk Me Home" / "What About Us" / "Just Like Fire"	5	6	2	2	0	15	10th
2	Keba	Severina	"Tridesete " / "Gas gas"	4	3	9	5	0	21	7th
3	Dušan Borković	Bradley Cooper	"Shallow"	6	5	5	6	5	27	5th
4	Ivana Peters	Lady Gaga	"Shallow"	12	10	4	9	5	40	3rd
5	Edita Aradinović	Eleni Foureira	"Fuego" / "Dancing Lasha Tumbai "	7	7	7	8	0	29	4th
6	Knez	Zorica Brunclik	"Branili su našu ljubav " / "Nevera moja " / "Sebi sam bila i rat i brat"	9	9	10	12	10	50	2nd
7	Aleksa Jelić	Vesna Zmijanac	"Branili su našu ljubav " / "Nevera moja " / "Sebi sam bila i rat i brat"	8	4	8	7	0	27	6th
8	Danijel Kajmakoski	Hugh Jackman	"The Greatest Show"	3	2	3	3	5	16	9th
9	Željko Šašić	Šaban Šaulić	"Verujem u ljubav"	10	12	12	10	25	69	1st (Winner)
10	Katarina Bogićević	Madonna	"Express Yourself"	2	8	6	4	0	20	8th

Bonus points

- Ana gave her five points to Željko
- Keba gave his five points to Željko
- Ivana gave her points to Dušan
- Dušan gave his five points to Ivana
- Edita gave her five points to Knez
- Aleksa gave his five points to Knez
- Knez gave his points to Željko
- Danijel gave his five points to Željko
- Željko gave his five points to Danijel
- Katarina gave her five points to Željko

=== Week 2 (October 11) ===
- Guest Judge: Aleksandar Atanasijević
- Winner: Edita Aradinović (team 4)

Order	Contestant	Performing as	Song	Points (judges and contestants)					Total	Result
Order	Contestant	Performing as	Song	Aleksandar Atanasijević	Duda Mijatović	Uroš Đurić	Dušan Alagić	Bonus	Total	Result
1	Aleksa Jelić	Panic! at the Disco	"High Hopes" / "ME!"	6	6	7	4	0	23	7th
2	Danijel Kajmakoski	Taylor Swift	"High Hopes" / "ME!"	5	7	6	6	5	29	6th
3	Keba	Zdravko Čolić	"Ti si mi u krvi" / "Glavo luda"	2	2	2	2	5	13	10th
4	Edita Aradinović	Halsey	"Without Me "	8	10	5	12	10	45	1st (Winner)
5	Ivana Peters	Halid Bešlić	"Romanija" / "Da zna zora" / "Na zadnjem sjedištu moga auta"	7	12	8	9	5	41	3rd
6	Katarina Bogićević	Željko Bebek	"Romanija" / "Da zna zora" / "Na zadnjem sjedištu moga auta"	3	5	12	10	10	40	4th
7	Ana Kokić	Buba Corelli	"Pravo vreme"	12	9	10	7	5	43	2nd
8	Željko Šašić	Maya Berović	"Pravo vreme"	10	3	4	3	0	20	9th
9	Knez	Jason Derulo	"Goodbye"	4	4	9	5	0	22	8th
10	Dušan Borković	Jamiroquai	"Deeper Underground"	9	8	3	8	10	38	5th

=== Week 3 (October 18) ===
- Guest Judge: Viktor Savić
- Winner: Katarina Bogićević (team 2)

Order	Contestant	Performing as	Song	Points (judges and contestants)					Total	Result
Order	Contestant	Performing as	Song	Viktor Savić	Duda Mijatović	Uroš Đurić	Dušan Alagić	Bonus	Total	Result
1	Ivana Peters	Cardi B	"I Like It"	9	3	9	5	0	26	6th
2	Knez	Senidah	"Mišići"	10	10	8	4	5	37	3rd
3	Keba	Mick Jagger	"Paint It Black" / "It's Only Rock 'n Roll" / "Proud Mary"	6	9	7	3	15	40	2nd
4	Dušan Borković	Tina Turner	"Paint It Black" / "It's Only Rock 'n Roll" / "Proud Mary"	3	4	5	8	5	25	8th
5	Danijel Kajmakoski	Petar Grašo	"Ako te pitaju"	2	6	10	2	0	20	9th
6	Edita Aradinović	Era Ojdanić	"Šumadijo, ko bi tebe ostavio" / "Supermeni" / "Pauk"	5	2	2	7	0	16	10th
7	Aleksa Jelić	Bruno Mars	"Uptown Funk" / "Formation"	4	8	4	10	5	31	4th
8	Ana Kokić	Beyoncé	"Uptown Funk" / "Formation"	7	7	6	6	5	31	4th
9	Željko Šašić	Nele Karajlić	"Nedjelja kad je otišo Hase"	8	5	3	9	0	25	7th
10	Katarina Bogićević	Billie Eilish	"Bad Guy"	12	12	12	12	15	63	1st (Winner)

Bonus points

- Ana gave her five points to Katarina
- Keba gave his five points to Nenad
- Ivana gave her points to Keba
- Dušan gave his five points to Keba
- Edita gave her five points to Katarina
- Aleksa gave his five points to Ana
- Knez gave his points to Katarina
- Danijel gave his five points to Aleksa
- Željko gave his five points to Keba
- Katarina gave her five points to Knez

=== Throwback week (October 25) ===
- Guest Judge: Mirjana Bobić Mojsilović
- Winner: Ana Kokić (team 1)
- Note: Contestants were given tasks from previous seasons with assignment to out-do the original imitation.

Order	Contestant	Performing as	Song	Points (judges and contestants)					Total	Result
Order	Contestant	Performing as	Song	Mirjana Bobić Mojsilović	Duda Mijatović	Uroš Đurić	Dušan Alagić	Bonus	Total	Result
1	Danijel Kajmakoski	Lady Gaga	"Applause"	7	8	8	5	5	33	5th
2	Katarina Bogićević	Sia	"Alive"	8	10	9	8	0	35	3rd
3	Knez	Zona Zamfirova	"Puče puška" / "Zonina pesme"	5	2	4	6	0	17	7th
4	Ivana Peters	Zona Zamfirova	"Puče puška" / "Zonina pesme"	10	4	6	7	0	27	6th
5	Aleksa Jelić	Blues Brothers	"Everybody Needs Somebody to Love"	2	5	2	3	5	17	9th
6	Željko Šašić	Blues Brothers	"Everybody Needs Somebody to Love"	4	6	3	4	0	17	8th
7	Keba	Rocky Horror Show	"Sweet Transvestite"	12	7	12	10	10	51	2nd
8	Ana Kokić	Marčelo	"Pegla"	6	12	10	12	30	70	1st (Winner)
9	Edita Aradinović	Pink	"Sober"	9	9	7	9	0	34	4th
10	Dušan Borković	Dragana Mirković	"Umirem, umirem majko"	3	3	5	2	0	13	10th

=== Week 5 (November 1) ===
- Guest Judges: Severina and Kaliopi
- Winner: Aleksa Jelić (team 1)
- Note: Kaliopi replaced Dubravka Mijatović in Week 5

Order	Contestant	Performing as	Song	Points (judges and contestants)					Total	Result
Order	Contestant	Performing as	Song	Severina	Kaliopi	Uroš Đurić	Dušan Alagić	Bonus	Total	Result
1	Knez	Mišo Kovač	"Još i danas teku suze jedne žene"	6	10	10	10	5	41	2nd
2	Ivana Peters	Hairspray	"You Can't Stop the Beat"	4	4	3	5	5	21	8th
3	Dušan Borković	Aca Lukas	"Nešto protiv bolova" / "Rađaj sinove"/ "Sunce ljubavi"	7	8	12	6	0	33	4th
4	Katarina Bogićević	Džej	"Nešto protiv bolova" / "Rađaj sinove"/ "Sunce ljubavi"	3	6	2	2	0	13	9th
5	Aleksa Jelić	Freddie Mercury	"Somebody to Love" / "Bohemian Rhapsody"	10	12	8	12	40	82	1st (Winner)
6	Ana Kokić	Boban Zdravković	"Prokleta je Amerika" / "Ljubav za ljubav"	9	9	7	8	0	33	3rd
7	Keba	Rammstein	"Feuer frei"	12	3	5	7	0	27	6th
8	Željko Šašić	Leo Martin	"Odiseja" / "Ima vremena"	2	2	4	4	0	12	10th
9	Danijel Kajmakoski	Maroon 5	"Girls Like You"	8	7	6	9	0	30	5th
10	Edita Aradinović	Gabrijela Pejčev & Mili	"Luda po tebe" / "Južni vetar gas"	5	5	9	3	0	22	7th

Bonus points

- Ana gave her five points to Aleksa
- Keba gave his five points to Aleksa
- Ivana gave her points to Aleksa
- Dušan gave his five points to Aleksa
- Edita gave her five points to Aleksa
- Aleksa gave his five points to Ivana
- Knez gave his points to Aleksa
- Danijel gave his five points to Aleksa
- Željko gave his five points to Knez
- Katarina gave her five points to Aleksa

=== Week of battle (November 8) ===
- Guest Judge: Tamara Dragičević
- Winner: Dušan Borković (team 4)
- Note: Each two contestants performed as same singer with same song. After performance, each judge gave his vote to one of the contestant. In case of the draw, the host gave the vote of decision. Better contestant from the duel has earned five points for his (her) team.

Order	Contestant	Performing as	Song	Points (judges and contestants)					Total	Result
Order	Contestant	Performing as	Song	Tamara Dragičević	Duda Mijatović	Uroš Đurić	Dušan Alagić	Bonus	Total	Result
1	Ivana Peters	Marija Šerifović / Psy	"Deo prošlosti" / "Gentleman"	12	10	12	12	5	51	2nd
2	Katarina Bogićević	Marija Šerifović / Psy	"Deo prošlosti" / "Gentleman"	2	3	4	3	0	12	10th
3	Ana Kokić	Sting / Moulin Rouge!	"Roxanne" / "El Tango de Roxanne"	5	7	3	4	0	19	8th
4	Edita Aradinović	Sting / Moulin Rouge!	"Roxanne" / "El Tango de Roxanne"	9	8	9	7	0	33	4th
5	Aleksa Jelić	Toše Proeski / Michael Jackson	"Igra bez granica" / "Smooth Criminal"	6	6	7	6	0	25	7th
6	Danijel Kajmakoski	Toše Proeski / Michael Jackson	"Igra bez granica" / "Smooth Criminal"	4	4	8	5	10	31	6th
7	Knez	Esma Redžepova / James Brown	"Zajdi zajdi" / "I Feel Good"	7	5	5	9	5	31	5th
8	Keba	Esma Redžepova / James Brown	"Zajdi zajdi" / "I Feel Good"	3	2	2	2	5	14	9th
9	Željko Šašić	AC/DC	"Thunderstruck" / "T.N.T." / "Highway to Hell"	10	9	6	10	10	45	3rd
10	Dušan Borković	AC/DC	"Thunderstruck" / "T.N.T." / "Highway to Hell"	8	12	10	12	15	57	1st (Winner)

Bonus points

- Ana gave her five points to Slavoljub
- Keba gave his five points to Knez
- Ivana gave her points to Danijel
- Dušan gave his five points to Željko
- Edita gave her five points to Danijel
- Aleksa gave his five points to Željko
- Knez gave his points to Keba
- Danijel gave his five points to Ivana
- Željko gave his five points to Dušan
- Katarina gave her five points to Dušan

Ivana Peters, Edita Aradinović, Knez, Danijel Kajmakoski and Željko Šašić have earned five points for their teams as winners of duels.

=== Week 7 (November 15) ===
- Guest Judge: Slađana Milošević
- Winner: Knez (team 5)

Order	Contestant	Performing as	Song	Points (judges and contestants)					Total	Result
Order	Contestant	Performing as	Song	Slađana Milošević	Duda Mijatović	Uroš Đurić	Dušan Alagić	Bonus	Total	Result
1	Dušan Borković	Joe Cocker	"Unchain My Heart"	7	3	7	3	0	20	7th
2	Željko Šašić	Dino Merlin	"Sredinom"	2	5	3	5	0	15	9th
3	Knez	Netta Barzilai	"Toy"	8	8	8	10	30	64	1st (Winner)
4	Keba	Dragan Stojnić	"Bila je tako lijepa"	3	4	2	4	0	13	10th
5	Ana Kokić	The Prodigy	"Firestarter"	10	10	10	9	0	39	3rd
6	Danijel Kajmakoski	Lizzo	"Truth Hurts"	9	2	4	2	0	17	8th
7	Ivana Peters	Ana Bekuta	"Imam jedan život" / "Zlatiborske zore"	5	9	9	6	10	39	4th
8	Edita Aradinović	Steven Tyler	"I Don't Wanna Miss a Thing"	12	12	12	12	10	58	2nd
9	Aleksa Jelić	The Greatest Showman	"Rewrite the Stars"	4	6	5	7	0	22	6th
10	Katarina Bogićević	The Greatest Showman	"Rewrite the Stars"	6	7	6	8	0	27	5th

=== Week of battle (November 22) ===
- Guest Judge: Anđelka Prpić
- Winner: Ivana Peters (team 3)
- Note: Each two contestants performed as same singer with same song, or opponent in the battle. After performance, each judge gave his vote to one of the contestant. In case of the draw, the host gave the vote of decision. Better contestant from the duel has earned five points for his (her) team.

Order	Contestant	Performing as	Song	Points (judges and contestants)					Total	Result
Order	Contestant	Performing as	Song	Anđelka Prpić	Duda Mijatović	Uroš Đurić	Dušan Alagić	Bonus	Total	Result
1	Aleksa Jelić	Kaliopi / Elvis Presley	"Rođeni" / "Jailhouse Rock"	4	4	3	3	0	14	9th
2	Dušan Borković	Kaliopi / Elvis Presley	"Rođeni" / "Jailhouse Rock"	2	2	2	2	0	8	10th
3	Knez	Zdravko Čolić / Ivana Peters	"Zvao sam je Emili" / "Zbunjena" / "Da l'si ikada mene voljela " / "Svet tuge" /"Bubamara" / "Zbog tebe (Gaće)" / "Ti si kao magija"	12	12	5	12	0	41	3rd
4	Ivana Peters	Zdravko Čolić / Knez	"Zvao sam je Emili" / "Zbunjena" / "Da l'si ikada mene voljela " / "Svet tuge" /"Bubamara" / "Zbog tebe (Gaće)" / "Ti si kao magija"	10	10	8	10	35	73	1st (Winner)
5	Keba	Sinan Sakić / Ana Kokić	"Lepa do bola" / "Ljubav na papiru" / "Imao sam" / "Idemo na sve" / "Bre gidi džanum"	7	3	10	5	0	25	7th
6	Ana Kokić	Sinan Sakić / Dragan Kojić Keba	"Lepa do bola" / "Ljubav na papiru" / "Imao sam" / "Idemo na sve" / "Bre gidi džanum"	3	5	7	4	5	24	8th
7	Edita Aradinović	Željko Šašić / Jon Bon Jovi	"Gori more" / "Boing 747"/ "Bed of Roses"	5	8	9	6	0	28	5th
8	Željko Šašić	Edita Aradinović / Jon Bon Jovi	"Gori more" / "Boing 747"/ "Bed of Roses"	9	9	12	7	5	42	2nd
9	Danijel Kajmakoski	Vasilija Radojčić / Red Hot Chili Peppers	"Mito bekrijo" / "Give It Away"	8	6	6	8	5	33	4th
10	Katarina Bogićević	Vasilija Radojčić / Red Hot Chili Peppers	"Mito bekrijo" / "Give It Away"	6	7	4	9	0	26	6th

Bonus points

- Ana gave her five points to Ivana
- Keba gave his five points to Ana
- Ivana gave her points to Željko
- Dušan gave his five points to Ivana
- Edita gave her five points to Ivana
- Aleksa gave his five points to Ivana
- Knez gave his points to Ivana
- Danijel gave his five points to Ivana
- Željko gave his five points to Ivana
- Katarina gave her five points to Daniel

Aleksa Jelić, Ivana Peters, Keba, Željko Šašić and Katarina Bogićević have earned five points for their teams as winners of duels.

=== Week 9 (November 29) ===
- Guest Judge: Nenad Okanović
- Winner: Danijel Kajmakoski (team 3)

Order	Contestant	Performing as	Song	Points (judges and contestants)					Total	Result
Order	Contestant	Performing as	Song	Nenad Okanović	Duda Mijatović	Uroš Đurić	Dušan Alagić	Bonus	Total	Result
1	Ivana Peters	The Weeknd	"The Hills" / "Starboy"	2	2	2	3	0	9	10th
2	Željko Šašić	Bajaga	"Šarene pilule za lilule" / "Od kada tebe volim"	6	6	6	6	0	24	6th
3	Knez	David Lee Roth	"Just a Gigolo" / "Jump"	9	9	10	7	0	35	4th
4	Keba	Fiddler on the Roof	"If I Were a Rich Man"	12	8	7	8	10	45	2nd
5	Katarina Bogićević	Lepa Brena	"Sanjam"	5	5	5	4	5	24	7th
6	Ana Kokić	Jennifer Lopez	"If You Had My Love" / "Get Right" / "Aguanile"	4	4	4	5	5	22	8th
7	Dušan Borković	Marc Anthony	"If You Had My Love" / "Get Right" / "Aguanile"	3	3	3	2	0	11	9th
8	Edita Aradinović	Camila Cabello	"Señorita"	7	10	9	10	5	41	3rd
9	Danijel Kajmakoski	Shawn Mendes	"Señorita"	10	12	12	9	25	68	1st (Winner)
10	Aleksa Jelić	Dragi Jelić	"Mornar" /"Čudna šuma"	8	7	8	12	0	35	5th

Bonus points

- Ana gave her five points to Daniel
- Keba gave his five points to Katarina
- Ivana gave her points to Daniel
- Dušan gave his five points to Daniel
- Edita gave her five points to Daniel
- Aleksa gave his five points to Keba
- Knez gave his points to Ana
- Danijel gave his five points to Edita
- Željko gave his five points to Daniel
- Katarina gave her five points to Keba

=== Throwback week (December 6) ===
- Guest Judge: Danica Maksimović
- Winner: Keba (team 2)
- Note: Contestants were given tasks from previous seasons with assignment to out-do their best imitation from the original series.

Order	Contestant	Performing as	Song	Points (judges and contestants)					Total	Result
Order	Contestant	Performing as	Song	Danica Maksimović	Duda Mijatović	Uroš Đurić	Dušan Alagić	Bonus	Total	Result
1	Edita Aradinović	Beyoncé	"Run the World (Girls)"	4	6	3	2	0	15	8th
2	Katarina Bogićević	The Phantom of the Opera	"The Phantom of the Opera"	12	8	9	9	0	38	4th
3	Aleksa Jelić	Robbie Williams	"Let Me Entertain You"	8	7	8	8	0	31	6th
4	Knez	Barbra Streisand	"Woman in Love"	3	4	2	4	0	13	9th
5	Željko Šašić	Aca Lukas	"Lična karta"	10	12	12	10	5	49	2nd
6	Keba	Kiss	"I Was Made for Lovin' You"	5	5	5	5	35	55	1st (Winner)
7	Ana Kokić	Pink	"Try"	9	10	10	12	5	46	3rd
8	Ivana Peters	Aretha Franklin	"Think"	7	9	6	7	5	34	5th
9	Danijel Kajmakoski	Rammstein	"Benzin"	6	3	7	6	0	22	7th
10	Dušan Borković	Jelena Karleuša	"Bankina"	2	2	4	3	0	11	10th

=== Semi-final (December 13) ===
- Guest Judge: Marinko Rokvić
- Winner: Daniel Kajmakoski (team 3)

Order	Contestant	Performing as	Song	Points (judges and contestants)						Total	Result
Order	Contestant	Performing as	Song	Marinko Rokvić	Duda Mijatović	Uroš Đurić	Dušan Alagić	Bonus	Televoting	Total	Result
1	Edita Aradinović	Rosalía	"De aquí no sales" / "Malamente"	6	2	9	2	15	6	40	4th
2	Keba	Olivera Katarina; Goran Bregović	"Đelem đelem" / "Kalašnjikov"	8	8	6	3	0	2	27	8th
3	Katarina Bogićević	Dua Lipa	"Don't Start Now"	4	3	3	6	0	3	19	10th
4	Knez	Boney M. Carl Douglas	"Rasputin" / "Kung Fu Fighting"	7	4	5	5	5	4	30	6th
5	Ivana Peters	Rihanna	"Love on the Brain"/"Bitch Better Have My Money"	10	10	10	7	5	7	49	2nd
6	Željko Šašić	Azra	"Men'se dušo od tebe ne rastaje" / "Voljela me nije nijedna"	5	7	7	8	0	9	36	5th
7	Ana Kokić	Lady Gaga	"Poker Face"/"Paparazzi"	9	9	8	10	0	10	46	3rd
8	Aleksa Jelić	Elton John	"Can You Feel The Love Tonight" / "I'm Still Standing"	3	6	4	9	0	8	30	7th
9	Danijel Kajmakoski	Sam Smith	"Lay Me Down"	12	12	12	12	20	12	80	1st (Winner)
10	Dušan Borković	Led Zeppelin	"Stairway to Heaven"	2	5	2	4	5	5	23	9th

Bonus points

- Ana gave her five points to Ivana
- Keba gave his five points to Edita
- Ivana gave her points to Daniel
- Dušan Borković gave his five points to Edita
- Edita gave her five points to Daniel
- Aleksa gave his five points to Dušan
- Knez gave his points to Daniel
- Daniel gave his five points to Edita
- Željko gave his five points to Knez
- Katarina gave her five points to Daniel

=== Final (December 20) ===
Guest Judges: Ivica Dačić & Haris Džinović
Series winners: Danijel Kajmakoski & Ivana Peters

Order	Celebrities / Teams	Performing as	Song	Result
1	Edita Aradinović & Dušan Borković	Miley Cyrus & Billy Idol	"Slide Away" / "Rebel Yell"	5th
2	Željko Šašić & Knez	Andrea Bocelli & Luciano Pavarotti	"Caruso" / "Nessun dorma"	2nd
3	Katarina Bogićević & Keba	Dubioza Kolektiv	"Kokuz"/"Rijaliti"	4th
4	Ana Kokić & Aleksa Jelić	Shakira & Alejandro Sanz	"La Tortura"	3rd
5	Danijel Kajmakoski & Ivana Peters	James Morrison & Nelly Furtado	"Broken Strings"	Winners
6	Haris Džinović & Ivica Dačić	X	"Romanija" / "Pusti me"	X
7	Dušan Alagić	Vlado Georgiev	"Sama bez ljubavi" / "Anđele"	X
8	Uroš Đurić	Hali Gali Halid	"Ne pitaj me"	X
9	Bane Lalić, Marija Kilibarda & Maja Mandžuka	X	"Vesela pesma"	X
