= Tvoje lice zvuči poznato (Serbian TV series) season 4 =

Tvoje lice zvuči poznato
- Season 4
- Presented by: Nina Seničar
- Judges: Branko Đurić; Andrija Milošević; Aleksandra Radović; Guest judge
- No. of contestants: 10
- Winner: Boban Rajović
- Runner-up: Tijana Dapčević

Release
- Original network: Prva Srpska Televizija
- Original release: 1 October – 17 December 2017

Season chronology
- ← Previous; Season 3 Next → Season 5

Tvoje lice zvuči poznato (Serbian Cyrillic: Твоје лице звучи познато) is the fourth season of the Serbian talent show Tvoje lice zvuči poznato, based on the global franchise Your Face Sounds Familiar. It aired between October 1 and December 17, 2017. The main judging panel consisted of actors and comedians Andrija Milošević and Branko Đurić, who returned after the second season, and singer Aleksandra Radović. Previous judge from series one and two, Marija Mihajlović, also returned as the vocal coach, working with the contestants alongside Radović. American-Serbian actor and model, Nina Seničar, served as the host. The series was won by singer Filip Mitrović.

== Format ==
The show challenges celebrities (singers and actors) to perform as different iconic music artists every week, which are chosen by the show's "Randomiser". They are then judged by the panel of celebrity judges including Branko Đurić, Aleksandra Radović and Andrija Milošević. Each week, one celebrity guest judge joins Branko, Aleksandra and Andrija to make up the complete judging panel. Each celebrity gets transformed into a different singer each week, and performs an iconic song and dance routine well known by that particular singer. The 'randomiser' can choose any older or younger artist available in the machine, or even a singer of the opposite sex, or a deceased singer. Winner of each episode wins €1000, and winner of whole show wins €25000. All money goes to charity of winner's own choice. The show lasts 12 weeks.

=== Voting ===
The contestants are awarded points from the judges (and each other) based on their singing, Acting and dance routines. Judges give points from 2 to 12, with the exception of 11. After that, each contestant gives 5 points to a fellow contestant of their choice (known as "Bonus" points). In week 11 (semi-final week) and in week 12 (final week), viewers also vote via text messages. In week 11 (semi-final), all judges points from past weeks and from semi-final are made into points from 2 to 12 (without 11). Contestants with most judges points will get 12 points, second placed will get 10, third placed 9 and 10th placed will get only 2 points. After that, public votes will also be made into points from 2 to 12, again with the exception of 11. Contestant with most public votes will get 12 points, second placed 10 and 10th placed will get only 2. All those points will be summed up and five contestants with most points will go to final week. In final week, judges will not vote - contestant with most public vote will win the show.

== Contestants ==
Celebrity	Notability	Episode(s) won	Total score	Result
Andrija Prlainović	Waterpolo player	9th, final	378	Winner
Tijana Dapčević	Singer	2nd	400	Runner-up
Edita Aradinović	Singer and former Ministarke member	3rd	395	Second runner-up
Dragana Mićalović	Actress	4th, 7th	344	4th place
Leon	Rapper and breakdancer	8th	350	5th place
Žarko Laušević	Actor and comedian	Semi-final	337	6th place
Nebojša Glogovac	Actor	10th	329	7th place
Ivan Paunić	Basketball Player	5th	322	8th place
Biljana Sečivanović	Singer and former Zvezde Granda contestant	6th	312	9th place
Bebi Dol	Singer-songwriter	1st	300	10th place

== Week 1 ==
Guest Judge: Hristina Popović
Aired: October 1, 2017
Winner: Bebi Dol

Order	Celebrity	Performing as	Song	Points (judges and contestants)					Total	Result
Order	Celebrity	Performing as	Song	Aleksandra	Andrija	Branko	Hristina	Bonus	Total	Result
1	Filip Mitrović	Coldplay	"Something Just Like This"	10	10	4	3	0	27	6th
2	Tijana Dapčević	Zdravko Čolić	"Glavo luda"	4	6	6	6	5	27	6th
3	Edita Aradinović	Beyoncé	"Pray You Catch Me" / "Hold Up" / "Don't Hurt Yourself"	12	9	10	10	10	51	2nd
4	Biljana Sečivanović	Halid Bešlić	"Ja bez tebe ne mogu da živim"	5	4	3	2	0	14	9th
5	Ivan Paunić	Luis Fonsi	"2U" / "Despacito"	3	2	2	5	0	12	10th
6	Leon	Justin Bieber	"2U" / "Despacito"	2	3	5	4	0	14	9th
7	Žarko Laušević	Lepa Brena	"Čačak, Čačak"	6	5	7	9	10	37	4th
8	Bebi Dol	Emeli Sande	"Hurts"	7	8	12	12	15	54	1st (Winner)
9	Dragana Micalovic	Nicki Minaj	"Light My Body Up" / "Swalla"	9	12	9	8	10	48	3rd
10	Nebojša Glogovac	Jason Derulo	"Light My Body Up" / "Swalla"	8	7	8	7	0	30	5th

Bonus points

- Filip gave five points to Bebi Dol
- Tijana gave five points to Edita Aradinović
- Edita gave five points to Bebi Dol
- Žarko gave five points to Dragana Mićalović
- Biljana gave five points to Žarko Laušević
- Leon gave five points to Edita Aradinović
- Ivan gave five points to Dragana Micalovic
- Bebi Dol five points to Tijana Dapčević
- Dragana gave five points to Žarko Laušević
- Branislav Lečić gave five points to Bebi Dol

== Week 2 ==
Guest Judge: Dragan Brajović Braja
Aired: October 8, 2017
Winner: Tijana Dapčević

Order	Celebrity	Performing as	Song	Points (judges and contestants)					Total	Result
Order	Celebrity	Performing as	Song	Aleksandra	Andrija	Branko	Dragan	Bonus	Total	Result
1	Leon	Saša Kovačević	"Temperatura"	5	4	4	2	5	20	8th
2	Tijana Dapčević	Lady Gaga	"A-Yo" / "Million Reasons"	12	8	8	12	15	55	1st (Winner)
3	Branislav Lečić	Bruno Mars	"Runaway Baby" / "Give It Away"	7	12	9	7	0	35	4th
4	Bane Vidaković	Red Hot Chili Peppers	"Runaway Baby" / "Give It Away"	4	7	5	4	0	20	8th
5	Boban Rajović	Toma Zdravković	"Umoran sam od života" / "Molitva je za me" / "Kafu mi draga ispeci" / "Dva smo sveta različita"	10	10	12	10	10	52	2nd
6	Dragana Mićalović	Predrag Gojković-Cune	"Umoran sam od života" / "Molitva je za me" / "Kafu mi draga ispeci" / "Dva smo sveta različita"	9	5	6	9	5	34	5th
7	Dušan Borković	Axl Rose	"Patience" / "Welcome To The Jungle"	8	6	10	8	15	47	3rd
8	Mira Škorić	Mimi Mercedez	"Ne možeš da sediš sa nama"	3	3	3	5	0	14	9th
9	Bebi Dol	Katarina Ostojić Kaya	"Ne možeš da sediš sa nama"	2	2	2	3	0	9	10th
10	Edita Aradinović	Severina	"Mrtav za mene" / "Otrove"	6	9	7	6	0	28	6th

Bonus points

- Boban gave five points to Dušan Borković
- Tijana gave five points to Boban Rajović
- Edita gave five points to Tijana Dapčević
- Bane gave five points to Tijana Dapčević
- Mira gave five points to Dušan Borković
- Leon gave five points to Tijana Dapčević
- Dušan gave five points to Stefan Dimitrijević Leon
- Bebi Dol five points to Dragana Mićalović
- Dragana Mićalović gave five points to Boban Rajović
- Branislav Lečić gave five points to Dušan Borković

== Week 3 ==
Guest Judge: Dušan Ivković
Aired: October 15, 2017
Winner: Edita Aradinović

Order	Celebrity	Performing as	Song	Points (judges and contestants)					Total	Result
Order	Celebrity	Performing as	Song	Aleksandra	Andrija	Branko	Dušan	Bonus	Total	Result
1	Mira Škorić	Ceca	"Nagovori" / "Autogram"	7	9	4	2	5	27	5th
2	Dragana Mićalović	Little Mix	"Shout Out To My Ex"	2	5	7	3	0	17	10th
3	Boban Rajović	Emina Jahović	"I da mogu" / "Moje zlato" / "Limunada"	10	2	2	7	5	26	6th
4	Leon	Milica Todorović	"I da mogu" / "Moje zlato" / "Limunada"	8	6	3	6	0	23	7th
5	Tijana Dapčević	Justin Timberlake	"Can't Stop the Feeling!"	6	8	12	12	5	43	2nd
6	Dušan Borković	Šaban Šaulić	"Žal"	9	10	9	10	0	38	3rd
7	Bane Vidaković	John Travolta	"Summer Nights"	3	3	6	5	0	17	10th
8	Bebi Dol	Olivia Newton-John	"Summer Nights"	4	4	5	4	5	22	8th
9	Branislav Lečić	Željko Joksimović	"Milimetar"	5	7	8	9	5	34	4th
10	Edita Aradinović	Tijana Dapčević	"Zemlja Mojih Snova"	12	12	10	8	25	67	1st (Winner)

Bonus points

- Mira Škorić gave five points to Boban Rajović
- Dragana Mićalović gave five points to Edita Aradinović
- Boban Rajović gave five points to Edita Aradinović
- Leon gave five points to Tijana Dapčević
- Tijana Dapčević gave five points to Edita Aradinović
- Bebi Dol gave five points to Edita Aradinović
- Bane Vidaković gave five points to Bebi Dol
- Dušan Borković five points to Branislav Lečić
- Branislav Lečić gave five points to Edita Aradinović
- Edita Aradinović gave five points to Mira Škorić

== Week 4 ==
Guest Judge: Jelena Karleuša
Aired: October 22, 2017
Winner: Dragana Mićalović

Order	Celebrity	Performing as	Song	Points (judges and contestants)					Total	Result
Order	Celebrity	Performing as	Song	Aleksandra	Andrija	Branko	Jelena	Bonus	Total	Result
1	Tijana Dapčević	Jessie J	"Bang Bang" / "Burnin' Up"	12	12	8	4	0	36	4th
2	Dušan Borković	Jelena Karleuša	"Bankina"	9	3	7	12	0	31	6th
3	Mira Škorić	Aca Lukas	"Bankina"	8	5	5	5	0	23	7th
4	Edita Aradinović	Adele	"Someone Like You"	5	8	12	7	5	37	3rd
5	Branislav Lečić	Vesna Zmijanac	"Ne kunite crne oči"	2	2	2	3	5	14	10th
6	Dragana Mićalović	Pink	"Let's Get This Party Started"	6	6	9	8	25	54	1st (Winner)
7	Bebi Dol	Leonard Cohen	"Hallelujah"	7	9	10	9	0	35	5th
8	Boban Rajović	Nele Karajlić	"Guzonjin sin"	3	7	3	6	0	19	8th
9	Leon	Kendrick Lamar	"Humble"	10	10	6	10	15	51	2nd
10	Bane Vidaković	Ed Sheeran	"Shape of You"	4	4	4	2	0	14	10th

Bonus points

- Mira Škorić gave five points to Dragana Mičalović
- Dragana Mićalović gave five points to Leon
- Boban Rajović gave five points to Leon
- Leon gave five points to Edita Aradinović
- Tijana Dapčević gave five points to Dragana Mićalović
- Bebi Dol gave five points to Branislav Lečić
- Branko Vidaković gave five points to Dragana Mićalović
- Dušan Borković five points to Dragana Mićalović
- Branislav Lečić gave five points to Dragana Mićalović
- Edita Aradinović gave five points to Leon

== Week 5 ==
Guest Judge: Ana Kokić
Aired: October 29, 2017
Winner: Dušan Borković

Order	Celebrity	Performing as	Song	Points (judges and contestants)					Total	Result
Order	Celebrity	Performing as	Song	Aleksandra	Andrija	Branko	Ana	Bonus	Total	Result
1	Bebi Dol	Merima Njegomir	"Ruzmarin"	2	2	4	2	0	10	10th
2	Edita Aradinović	Jennifer Lopez	"On The Floor" / “Rain Over Me" / "Olvídame y Pega la Vuelta"	10	10	8	10	0	38	4th
3	Leon	Pitbull	"On The Floor" / “Rain Over Me" / "Olvídame y Pega la Vuelta"	8	7	9	9	0	33	5th
4	Dušan Borković	Marc Anthony	"On The Floor" / “Rain Over Me" / "Olvídame y Pega la Vuelta"	12	12	12	12	10	58	1st (Winner)
5	Boban Rajović	Toše Proeski	"Igra bez granica"	4	8	6	6	0	24	7th
6	Branislav Lečić	The Barber of Seville	"The Barber of Seville (Figaro's Aria)"	6	3	10	3	20	42	2nd
7	Dragana Mićalović	Džej	"Seksi ritam (Ritam da te pitam)”	3	4	2	7	0	16	9th
8	Tijana Dapčević	Dara Bubamara	"Seksi ritam (Ritam da te pitam)”	5	5	3	8	0	21	8th
9	Branko Vidaković	Tina Turner	"We Don't Need Another Hero (Thunderdome)"	7	6	5	4	20	42	2nd
10	Mira Škorić	Zorica Brunclik	"A tebe nema"	9	9	7	5	0	30	6th

Bonus points

- Mira Škorić gave five points to Branislav Lečić
- Dragana Mićalović gave five points to Branislav Lečić
- Boban Rajović gave five points to Bane Vidaković
- Leon gave five points to Dušan Borković
- Tijana Dapčević gave five points to Branislav Lečić
- Bebi Dol gave five points to Branko Vidaković
- Branko Vidaković gave five points to Branislav Lečić
- Dušan Borković five points to Bane Vidaković
- Branislav Lečić gave five points to Bane Vidaković
- Edita Aradinović gave five points to Dušan Borković

== Week 6 ==
Guest Judge: Marija Šerifović
Aired: November 5, 2017
Winner: Mira Škorić

Order	Celebrity	Performing as	Song	Points (judges and contestants)					Total	Result
Order	Celebrity	Performing as	Song	Aleksandra	Andrija	Branko	Marija	Bonus	Total	Result
1	Branislav Lečić	Dino Dvornik	"Jače manijače"	2	3	2	2	5	14	10th
2	Boban Rajović	Maluma	"Chantaje"	7	9	8	4	0	28	5th
3	Dragana Mićalović	Shakira	"Chantaje"	3	4	6	3	5	21	9th
4	Edita Aradinović	Tifa	"Lažeš zlato, lažeš dušo" / "Pediculis pubis" / "Draga ne budi peder"	8	6	3	9	0	26	6th
5	Bane Vidaković	Bora Čorba	"Lažeš zlato, lažeš dušo" / "Pediculis pubis" / "Draga ne budi peder"	9	10	9	8	0	36	2nd
6	Bebi Dol	Donna Summer	"I Feel Love" / "Hot Stuff"	6	2	4	7	5	24	8th
7	Tijana Dapčević	Bebi Dol	"Da pričamo o ljubavi" / "Mustafa"	5	5	10	10	5	35	3rd
8	Leon	Twenty One Pilots	"Heavy Dirty Soul" / “Heathens” / “Stressed Out”	10	8	5	5	5	33	4th
9	Mira Škorić	Marija Šerifović	"Deo prošlosti"	12	12	12	12	25	73	1st (Winner)
10	Dušan Borković	Harry Styles	"Sign of the Times"	4	7	7	6	0	24	8th

Bonus points

- Mira Škorić gave five points to Leon
- Dragana Mićalović gave five points to Mira Škorić
- Boban Rajović gave five points to Dragana Mićalović
- Leon gave five points to Mira Škorić
- Tijana Dapčević gave five points to Bebi Dol
- Bebi Dol gave five points to Mira Škorić
- Branko Vidaković gave five points to Tijana Dapčević
- Dušan Borković five points to Mira Škorić
- Branislav Lečić gave five points to Mira Škorić
- Edita Aradinović gave five points to Branislav Lečić

== Week 7 ==
Guest Judge: Aleksandar Milić Mili
Aired: November 12, 2017
Winner: Dragana Mićalović

Order	Celebrity	Performing as	Song	Points (judges and contestants)					Total	Result
Order	Celebrity	Performing as	Song	Aleksandra	Andrija	Branko	Aleksandar	Bonus	Total	Result
1	Edita Aradinović	Ana Nikolić	"Đavo" / "Kavasaki" / "Slučajnost"	10	7	6	10	0	33	5th
2	Boban Rajović	Rasta	"Đavo" / "Kavasaki" / "Slučajnost"	8	8	7	9	5	37	2nd
3	Branislav Lečić	Ricky Martin	"Vente Pa' Ca"	2	2	3	8	10	25	8th
4	Leon	Dragan Kojić Keba	"Ko te ima taj te nema" / "Ona to zna"	3	3	8	5	0	19	10th
5	Dušan Borković	Robbie Williams	"Heavy Entertainment Show" / "Candy"	6	6	5	3	5	25	8th
6	Dragana Mićalović	Louis	"Ne kuni me, ne ruži me majko"	12	12	12	12	10	58	1st (Winner)
7	Branko Vidaković	Run-DMC	"Walk This Way"	4	4	2	4	5	19	10th
8	Tijana Dapčević	Run-DMC	"Walk This Way"	7	9	10	6	5	37	2nd
9	Bebi Dol	Steven Tyler	"Walk This Way"	5	10	9	2	0	26	6th
10	Mira Škorić	Ministarke	"Boing 747"	9	5	4	7	10	35	4th

Bonus points

- Mira Škorić gave five points to Dragana Mićalović
- Dragana Mićalović gave five points to Dušan Borković
- Boban Rajović gave five points to Branislav Lečić
- Leon gave five points to Branislav Lečić
- Tijana Dapčević gave five points to Mira Škorić
- Bebi Dol gave five points to Branko Vidaković
- Branko Vidaković gave five points to Dragana Mićalović
- Dušan Borković five points to Tijana Dapčević
- Branislav Lečić gave five points to Miloš Vujanović
- Edita Aradinović gave five points to Mira Škorić

== Week 8 (Eurovision Night) ==
Guest Judge: Katarina Radivojević
Aired: November 19, 2017
Winner: Leon

Order	Celebrity	Performing as	Song	Points (judges and contestants)					Total	Result
Order	Celebrity	Performing as	Song	Aleksandra	Andrija	Branko	Katarina	Bonus	Total	Result
1	Dragana Mićalović	Ruslana	"Wild Dances"	4	6	3	6	0	19	9th
2	Boban Rajović	Željko Joksimović	"Lane moje"	5	3	6	10	0	24	7th
3	Branko Vidaković	Giorgos Alkaios	"Opa"	8	5	10	12	10	45	2nd
4	Edita Aradinović	Marija Šerifović	"Molitva"	10	10	4	9	0	33	3rd
5	Bebi Dol	Tajči	"Hajde da ludujemo"	9	7	9	3	5	33	3rd
6	Tijana Dapčević	Cezar	"It's My Life"	3	4	8	4	0	19	9th
7	Leon	Laka	"Pokušaj"	12	12	12	8	30	74	1st (Winner)
8	Branislav Lečić	Lordi	"Hard Rock Hallelujah"	6	9	7	7	0	29	6th
9	Mira Škorić	Marko Kon	"Cipela"	7	8	5	5	5	30	5th
10	Dušan Borković	Conchita Wurst	"Rise Like a Phoenix"	2	2	2	2	0	8	10th

Bonus points

- Mira Škorić gave five points to Leon
- Dragana Mićalović gave five points to Bane Vidaković
- Boban Rajović gave five points to Mira Škorić
- Leon gave five points to Bebi Dol
- Tijana Dapčević gave five points to Bane Vidaković
- Bebi Dol gave five points to Leon
- Bane Vidaković gave five points to Leon
- Dušan Borković five points to Leon
- Branislav Lečić gave five points to Leon
- Edita Aradinović gave five points to Leon

== Week 9 ==
Guest Judge: Neda Arnerić
Aired: November 26, 2017
Winner: Boban Rajović

Order	Celebrity	Performing as	Song	Points (judges and contestants)					Total	Result
Order	Celebrity	Performing as	Song	Aleksandra	Andrija	Branko	Neda	Bonus	Total	Result
1	Leon	Seka Aleksić	"Aspirin"	2	3	4	4	0	13	9th
2	Edita Aradinović	Michael Jackson	"Smooth Criminal"	9	10	8	6	0	33	4th
3	Dragana Mićalović	Dragana Mirković	"Varala bih varala" / "Milo moje, što te nema"	5	4	5	9	0	23	7th
4	Mira Škorić	Barbra Streisand	"Woman in Love" / "Crying Time" / "Shake Your Tail Feather"	6	6	7	7	0	26	6th
5	Branko Vidaković	Ray Charles	"Woman in Love" / "Crying Time" / "Shake Your Tail Feather"	7	7	6	8	0	28	5th
6	Boban Rajović	Oliver Dragojević	"Molitva za Magdalenu" / "Bez tebe"	8	8	9	5	45	75	1st (Winner)
7	Dušan Borković	Lenny Kravitz	"Always on the Run"	3	5	2	3	0	13	9th
8	Branislav Lečić	Twins	"Plavi slon"	4	2	3	2	0	11	10th
9	Tijana Dapčević	Taylor Swift	"Look What You Made Me Do"	10	12	10	10	5	47	2nd
10	Bebi Dol	Cane	"Ulični hodač" / "Kreni prema meni"	12	9	12	12	0	45	3rd

Bonus points

All contestants gave five points to Boban Rajović, while Boban Rajović gave five points to Tijana Dapčević.

== Week 10 ==
Guest Judge: Milutin Karadžić
Aired: December 3, 2017
Winner: Nebojša Glogovac

Order	Celebrity	Performing as	Song	Points (judges and contestants)					Total	Result
Order	Celebrity	Performing as	Song	Aleksandra	Andrija	Branko	Milutin	Bonus	Total	Result
1	Branko Vidaković	Bajaga	"Od kada tebe volim" / "Berlin"	2	2	3	4	15	26	7th
2	Dušan Borković	Đorđe Balašević	"Samo da rata ne bude"	4	4	5	3	0	16	10th
3	Boban Rajović	Pharrell Williams	"Happy" / "Swish Swish" / "Feels"	7	12	4	6	0	29	6th
4	Mira Škorić	Katy Perry	"Happy" / "Swish Swish" / "Feels"	3	3	2	8	0	16	10th
5	Dragana Mićalović	Nina Badrić	"Da se opet tebi vratim" / "Moj je život Švicarska" / "Ti si mene"	5	8	9	9	0	31	5th
6	Leon	Dino Merlin	"Da se opet tebi vratim" / "Moj je život Švicarska" / "Ti si mene"	9	9	10	10	0	38	3rd
7	Nebojša Glogovac	Antonio Banderas	"Canción del Mariachi"	6	6	8	7	35	62	1st (Winner)
8	Tijana Dapčević	Madonna	"Bitch I'm Madonna"	12	10	7	12	0	41	2nd
9	Bebi Dol	Amy Winehouse	"Valerie"	10	5	12	5	0	32	4th
10	Edita Aradinović	Indira Radić	"Zmaj" / "Marija"	8	7	6	2	0	23	8th

Bonus points

- Branko Vidaković gave five points to Nebojša Glogovac
- Dušan Borković gave five points to Nebojša Glogovac
- Boban Rajović gave five points to Nebojša Glogovac
- Mira Škorić gave five points to Nebojša Glogovac
- Leon gave five points to Bane Vidaković
- Dragana Mićalović gave five points to Nebojša Glogovac
- Nebojša Glogovac gave five points to Bane Vidaković
- Tijana Dapčević gave five points to Nebojša Glogovac
- Bebi Dol gave five points to Nebojša Glogovac
- Edita Aradinović gave five points to Bane Vidaković

== Week 11 (Semi-final) ==
Guest Judge: Karolina Gočeva
Aired: December 10, 2017
Winner: Branko Vidaković

Order	Celebrity	Performing as	Song	Points (judges and contestants)					Total	Result
Order	Celebrity	Performing as	Song	Aleksandra	Andrija	Branko	Karolina	Bonus	Total	Result
1	Bane Vidaković	Garavi Sokak	"Biće bolje ako budeš tu" / "Neko neko ko je daleko"	5	3	5	5	35	53	1st (Winner, Eliminated)
2	Dragana Mićalović	Luz Casal	"Madrugadas"	3	5	6	9	0	23	8th (Finalist)
3	Dušan Borković	AC/DC	"Thunderstruck"	12	12	8	3	15	50	2nd (Eliminated)
4	Edita Aradinović	Evanescence	"My Immortal" / "Bring Me To Life"	8	8	4	6	0	26	7th (Finalist)
5	Mira Škorić	Kaliopi	"Nevinost"	4	4	3	2	0	13	9th (Eliminated)
6	Danijel Alibabić	Ariana Grande & Imagine Dragons	"Side to Side" / "Radioactive"	10	10	9	8	0	37	3rd (Finalist)
7	Leon	Nicki Minaj & Kendrick Lamar	"Side to Side" / "Radioactive"	6	6	10	10	0	32	6th (Finalist)
8	Nebojša Glogovac	Marčelo	"Sveti bes"	7	7	12	7	0	33	5th (Eliminated)
9	Tijana Dapčević	Pink	"Just Like Fire"	9	9	7	12	0	37	3rd (Finalist)
10	Bebi Dol	Christina Aguilera	"Beautiful"	2	2	2	4	0	10	10th (Eliminated)

Bonus points

- Bane Vidaković gave five points to Dušan Borković
- Dušan Borković gave five points to Bane Vidaković
- Boban Rajović gave five points to Bane Vidaković
- Mira Škorić gave five points to Bane Vidaković
- Leon gave five points to Bane Vidaković
- Dragana Mićalović gave five points to Bane Vidaković
- Branislav Lečić gave five points to Bane Vidaković
- Tijana Dapčević gave five points to Branislav Lečić
- Bebi Dol gave five points to Dušan Borković
- Edita Aradinović gave five points to Dušan Borković

== Week 12 (Final) ==
Aired: December 17, 2017
Guest Judge: Željko Vasić
Series winner: Boban Rajović

Order	Celebrity	Performing as	Song	Result
1	Tijana Dapčević	Freddie Mercury	"Who Wants To Live Forever" / "The Show Must Go On"	2nd
2	Leon	Sinan Sakić	"Lepa do bola" / "Ej od kad sam se rodio"	5th
3	Edita Aradinović	Beyoncé	"Run the World (Girls)"	3rd
4	Dragana Mićalović	Jennifer Lopez	"If You Had My Love" / "Get Right"	4th
5	Boban Rajović	Elvis Presley	"Always On My Mind" / "Jailhouse Rock"	Winner
6	Bane Vidaković	Army of Lovers	"Crucified"	X
6	Mira Škorić	Army of Lovers	"Crucified"	X
6	Bebi Dol	Army of Lovers	"Crucified"	X
7	Andrija Milošević	Snow / Đorđe Đogani	"Informer" / "Idemo na Mars"	X
7	Aleksandra Radović	Slađa Delibašić	"Informer" / "Idemo na Mars"	X
8	Dušan Borković	Azucar Moreno	"Bandido"	X
8	Nina Seničar	Azucar Moreno	"Bandido"	X
9	Nebojša Glogovac	Haris Džinović	"Laže mjesec"	X
10	Branko Đurić Đuro	Tom Jones	"Sexbomb"	X
11	Boban Rajović	Bob Dylan	"Girl from the North Country" / "Ballad of a Thin Man"	Winner's choice

== Notes ==
1. Dušan and Leon performed together.
2. Dragana and Branislav performed together.
3. Branislav and Bane performed together as Bruno Mars' and Anthony Kiedis' performance at the Super Bowl Halftime show. While the performance of the two bohemians (Toma & Cune) is considered the most emotional performance, the judges consider this performance to be the energetic, and humorous.
4.Dragana and Boban performed together. This performance is considered to be one of the most emotional performances of the whole series.
5. Bebi and Mira performed together.
6. Boban and Leon performed together.
7. Bebi and Bane performed together.
8. Dušan and Mira performed together.
9. Edita, Leon and Pagonis performed together.
10. Tijana and Dragana performed together.
11. Stevan and Dragana performed together.
12. Bane and Edita performed together.
13. Edita and Stevan performed together.
14. Bebi, Tijana and Bane performed together.
15. The eight episode was the first episode that had a specific theme. The theme for the episode was Eurovision.
16. Bane and Mira performed together.
17. Boban and Mira performed together.
18. Boban and Dragana performed together.
19. Boban and Leon performed together. Boban portrayed two different characters (Dan Reynolds and Ariana Grande), as well as Leon (Kendrick Lamar and Nicki Minaj).
20. Bebi, Bane and Mira performed together.
21. Andrija and Aleksandra performed together, although Andrija sang "Informer" by the Canadian reggae artist Snow before the duet.
22. Dušan and Nina performed together.
23. Branko sang "Sex Bomb" using his parody lyrics.
