= Kokić =

Kokić is a Serbo-Croatian surname. Notable people with the surname include:

- Ana Kokić (born 1983), Serbian singer-songwriter
- Emilija Kokić (born 1968), Croatian singer
