= Aleksa Jelić =

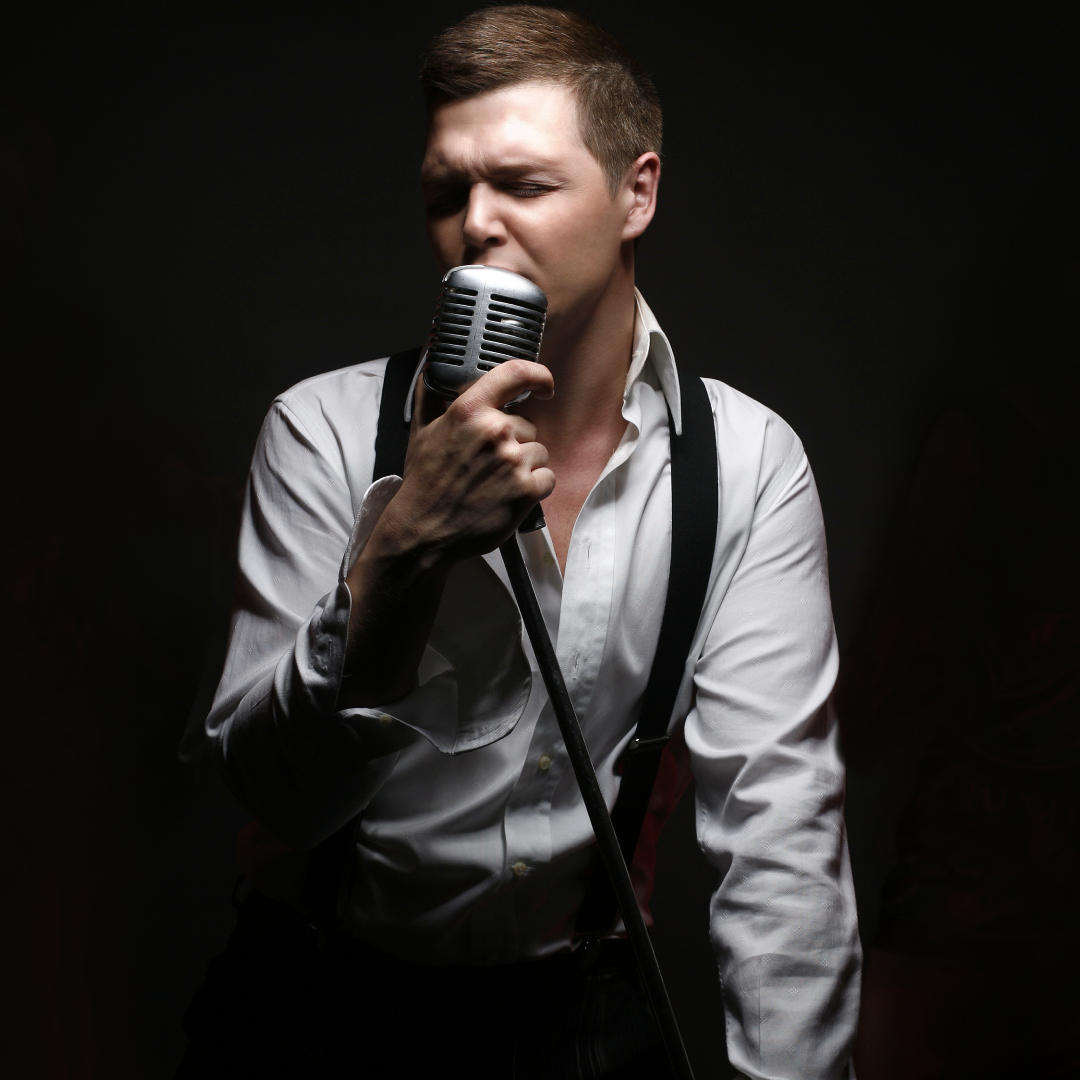
- Aleksa Jelić in 2008

Background information
- Born: Aleksa Jelić; 19 November 1976 (age 49); Belgrade, SR Serbia, SFR Yugoslavia
- Genres: Pop; dance-pop
- Occupations: Singer; dancer; presenter
- Years active: 2007–present
- Label: PGP-RTS

Aleksa Jelić (Serbian Cyrillic: Алекса Јелић; born 19 November 1976) is a Serbian singer, ballet dancer and television presenter.

== Life and career ==
Jelić was born on 19 November 1976 in Belgrade, SFR Yugoslavia. He is the son of rock musician and founder of YU Grupa, Dragi Jelić.

At 17 years of age, Jelić became the youngest permanent ballet dancer at the Terazije Theater in Belgrade.

In March 2007, he rose to prominence as a singer by competing on Serbian national selection for the Eurovision Song Contest, called Beovizija, with the song "Beli grad", finishing in 7th place. The following year, he returned to Beovizija with "Beli jablan" featuring Ana Štajdohar, ending up as the runner-up. Same year in May, Jelić also released his debut album U tami disko kluba under PGP-RTS.

In November 2010, he released his second studio album Javna tajna. Jelić released the single "Idemo u grad" in October 2012, which served as the official anthem for the Belgrade Pride that year. In October 2013, Jelić became a contestant on the first season of the Serbian version of Your Face Sounds Familiar, where he finished in 3rd place. In March 2014, he was announced as the presenter of the Serbian spin-off of Dancing with the Stars. In February 2015, Jelić applied to represent Serbia on the Eurovision once again with the song "Vodi me". He finished in 3rd place out of three entries. In June 2019, Jelić released his third album Metamorfoza. Later that year, he competed on the All Stars season of Tvoje lice zvuči poznato, paired with the season one-winner, Ana Kokić. The two reached the grand final and ultimately placed as the second runner-ups.

Since 1999, Jelić has resided between Belgrade and Barcelona, Spain, where he works in the hospitality industry.

== Discography ==
Studio albums

- U tami disko kluba (2008)
- Javna tajna (2010)
- Matamorfoza (2019)

== Filmography ==
Filmography of Aleksa Jelić
Year	Title	Genre	Role	Notes
2007	Beovizija	Television	Himself	7th place with "Beli grad"
2008	Beovizija	Television	Himself	Runner-up with "Beli jablan" feat. Ana Štajdohar
2013	Tvoje lice zvuči poznato	Television	Himself	Season 1, 3rd place
2014	Ples sa zvezdama	Television	Himself	Presenter
2015	Odbrojavanje za Beč	Television	Himself	3rd place with "Vodi me"
2019	Tvoje lice zvuči poznato	Television	Himself	Season 5: All Stars, 3rd place alongside Ana Kokić
