= Milica Fajgelj =

Milica Fajgelj (born 22 February) is a Serbian born artist manager and video producer. Milica graduated audio and video production at the Academy of Arts in Belgrade, Serbia. Her most famous projects are connected with the Eurovision Song Contest, but also managing and working with several international singers, such as Laila Samuelsen, Marcin Mroziński, Rikke Normann, Judith van Hel, Bojan Marovic, Knez, Lara Lee, Sergej Cetkovic, Who See, Eduard Romanyuta, Serhat, Anja Nissen, Luke Black and many other.

She is also known as a songwriter with Swedish/Norwegian multi-platinum music producers MachoPsycho by writing electro pop song Superman for national Romanian Eurovision selection, performed by Lara Lee. Also, she co-wrote the English version of song Adio for the Eurovision Song Contest 2015 and Montenegro participant Knez, composed and produced by Zeljko Joksimovic.

In March 2017, Milica Fajgelj was selected as an international jury member for national Eurovision Song Contest selection in Iceland called Söngvakeppnin where she gave her maximum points to their artist Svala who ended representing Iceland in Eurovision Song Contest 2017 later on in Kiev, Ukraine.

She was at the Balkan hiphop record label Bassivity Digital. Milica manages Senidah, Zoi, Bojana Vunturišević and many more artists.

In 2024, Milica Fajgelj served as the creative show producer for Serbia’s national competitor, Teya Dora, at Pesma za Evroviziju, where they won the competition. She continues managing the artist at the Eurovision Song Contest in Malmö, Sweden.

In February 2025, Milica Fajgelj was selected as an international jury member for the Irish national Eurovision Song Contest final, organized by RTÉ. She also served as the jury spokesperson on The Late Late Show.

On March 1, Milica Fajgelj was invited by Danish national TV Danish Broadcasting Corporation once again as an international jury for their national Eurovision final of Dansk Melodi Grand Prix

Since 2025. Milica Fajgelj manages Serbian rock band Oxajo.
