= Stevan Anđelković =

Serbian recording artist and actor (born 1988)

Stevan Anđelković Стеван Анђелковић
- Born: 8 February 1988 (age 38); Vučje, SR Serbia, SFR Yugoslavia
- Occupation: Singer
- Years active: 2003–present
- Label: Grand Production

Stevan Anđelković (Serbian Cyrillic: Стеван Анђелковић; born 8 February 1988) is a Serbian recording artist and actor. In 2004, he gained relevance as the runner-up in the first season of Zvezde Granda. After hiatus, he made his acting comeback in 2010, playing the role of Perhan in the re-release of the Serbian film Time of the Gypsies.

== Early life ==
Anđelković, a Vučje native, showed interest in music at a very young age, thus in his early youth started learning to play the piano and harmonica. Gaining the ability to play it at a semi-professional level at the Belgrade music school, at 16 years of age, he participated in the first season of Zvezde Granda, where he reached second place, amassing popularity across Serbia.

In 2010, he starred as Perhan in the rendition of the cult Yugoslav film Time of the Gypsies, directed by Emir Kusturica, which is a role originally played by Davor Dujmović. He performed alongside Milica Todorović, who played Azra, a character originally played by Sinolička Trpkova. The musical interpretation gained massive acclaim due to the new elements it blended in to the movie classic.

Anđelković resides in Belgrade and is close friends with co-star Todorović.

== Tvoje lice zvuči poznato ==
One of his more notable projects was in late 2017, when he was a contestant in the fourth season of Tvoje lice zvuči poznato, the Serbian adaptation of Your Face Sounds Familiar. Out of the 12 weeks, he only won once having impersonated Oliver Dragojević, but he was also praised for his performances impersonating Toma Zdravković, Toše Proeski, Emina Jahović and Rasta. In the finals, he claimed the victory of the entire season as Elvis Presley in December 2017, performing "Always On My Mind" and "Jailhouse Rock".

== Discography ==
Albums

- Startujmo (2005)

Singles & EPs

- "Pilula tona"/Šta Voziš" (2017; single)
- Šta Voziš? (2017; EP)
