= Tvoje lice zvuči poznato (Serbian TV series) season 2 =

Tvoje lice zvuči poznato
- Season 2
- Presented by: Marija Kilibarda; Bojan Ivković; Stefan Buzurović
- Judges: Branko Đurić; Marija Mihajlović; Ivan Ivanović; Guest judge
- No. of contestants: 10
- Winner: Slobodan Đurković
- Runner-up: Elena Risteska

Release
- Original network: Prva Srpska Televizija
- Original release: 12 October – 28 December 2014

Season chronology
- ← Previous; Season 1 Next → Season 3

Tvoje lice zvuči poznato 2 (Serbian Cyrillic: Твоје лице звучи познато) is the second season of the Serbian reality competition Tvoje lice zvuči poznato, based on Your Face Sounds Familiar. It started airing on October 12, 2014 and ended on December 28. The previous season's judges, TV presenter Ivan Ivanović and vocalist Marija Mihajlović, returned for another series, whilst actress Katarina Radivojević was replaced with comedian and actor Branko Đurić. Marija Kilibarda co-hosted the show again, this time with actor Bojan Ivković. The series was won by singer Slobodan Đurković.

== Format ==
The show challenges celebrities (singers and actors) to perform as different iconic music artists every week, which are chosen by the show's "Randomiser". They are then judged by the panel of celebrity judges including Ivan Ivanović, Branko Đurić Đura and Marija Mihajlović. Each week, one celebrity guest judge joins Ivan, Branko and Marija to make up the complete judging panel. Marija Mihajlović is also a voice coach. Each celebrity gets transformed into a different singer each week, and performs an iconic song and dance routine well known by that particular singer. The 'randomiser' can choose any older or younger artist available in the machine, or even a singer of the opposite sex, or a deceased singer. Winner of each episode wins €1000, and winner of whole show wins €25000. All money goes to charity of winner's own choice. The show lasts 12 weeks.

=== Voting ===
The contestants are awarded points from the judges (and each other) based on their singing, Acting and dance routines. Judges give points from 2 to 12, with the exception of 11. After that, each contestant gives 5 points to a fellow contestant of their choice (known as "Bonus" points). In week 11 (semi-final week) and in week 12 (final week), viewers also vote via text messages. In week 11 (semi-final), all judges points from past weeks and from semi-final are made into points from 2 to 12 (without 11). Contestants with most judges points will get 12 points, second placed will get 10, third placed 9 and 10th placed will get only 2 points. After that, public votes will also be made into points from 2 to 12, again with the exception of 11. Contestant with most public votes will get 12 points, second placed 10 and 10th placed will get only 2. All those points will be summed up and five contestants with most points will go to final week. In final week, judges will not vote - contestant with most public vote will win the show.

== Contestants ==
Celebrity	Notability	Episode(s) won	Total score	Result
Slobodan Đurković	Singer and former Zvezde Granda contestant	6th, final	383	Winner
Elena Risteska	Singer	5th	332	Runner-up
Katarina Bogićević	Actress and former Ja imam talenat! contestant	2nd, Semi-final	330	Second runner-up
Jelena Gavrilović	Actress	8th	415	4th place
Nenad Okanović	Actor	4th	373	5th place
Ivan Jevtović	Actor	10th	373	6th place
Neda Ukraden	Singer	1st	350	7th place
Vanja Mijatović	Singer and former Zvezde Granda contestant	9th	328	8th place
Dragan Kojić Keba	Singer	3rd	318	9th place
Zvonko "Čipi" Pantović	Osvajači singer	7th	291	10th place

== Series overview ==
=== Week 1 (October 12) ===
- Guest Judge: Ana Kokić
- Winner: Neda Ukraden

Order	Celebrity	Performing as	Song	Points (judges and contestants)					Total	Result
Order	Celebrity	Performing as	Song	Ana	Ivan	Branko	Marija	Bonus	Total	Result
1	Jelena Gavrilović	Jelena Rozga	"Nirvana"	3	7	12	8	10	40	3rd
2	Stefan Mitrović	Kerber	"Ratne igre"	12	10	10	7	5	44	2nd
3	Nenad Okanović	Mirna Radulović	"Ljubav je svuda"	10	12	3	2	0	27	8th
4	Neda Ukraden	Beyoncé	"Sweet Dreams"	8	6	9	12	10	45	1st (Winner)
5	Katarina Bogićević	Toše Proeski	"Soba za tugu"	4	2	2	4	10	22	9th
6	Katarina Tomašević	Nataša Bekvalac	Mali Signali	6	5	7	6	5	29	6th
7	Ivan Jevtović	Saša Đorđević	"Igraj i pobedi"	5	3	6	5	10	29	7th
8	Čipi	Celine Dion	"My Heart Will Go On"	2	4	4	3	0	13	10th
9	Elena Risteska	Severina	"Uno momento"	7	8	5	9	0	29	5th
10	Halid Bešlić	Fiddler on the Roof	"If I Were A Rich Man"	9	9	8	10	0	36	4th

Bonus points

- Jelena Gavrilović gave five points to Katarina Bogićević
- Neda Ukraden gave five points to Ivan Jevtović
- Katarina Tomašević gave five points to Stefan Mitrović
- Halid Bešlić gave five points to Jelena Gavrilović
- Nenad Okanović gave five points to Ivan Jevtović
- Elena Risteska gave five points to Katarina Bogićević
- Zvonko Pantović gave five points to Jelena Gavrilović
- Katarina Tomašević gave five points to Katarina Tomašević
- Katarina Bogićević gave five points to Neda Ukraden
- Ivan Jevtović gave five points to Neda Ukraden

=== Week 2 (October 19) ===
- Guest Judge: Milan Lane Gutović
- Winner: Katarina Bogićević

Order	Celebrity	Performing as	Song	Points (judges and contestants)					Total	Result
Order	Celebrity	Performing as	Song	Lane	Ivan	Branko	Marija	Bonus	Total	Result
1	Elena Risteska	Britney Spears	"I'm a Slave 4 U"	8	8	10	12	0	38	4th
2	Bane Mojićević	Lepa Brena	"Mile voli disko"	9	9	8	6	10	42	2nd
3	Katarina Bogićević	Whitney Houston	"I Will Always Love You"	12	12	12	10	20	66	1st (Winner)
4	Jelena Gavrilović	Renée Zellweger	"Chicago Cell Block Tango"	10	10	9	8	5	42	3rd
5	Neda Ukraden	Catherine Zeta-Jones	"Chicago Cell Block Tango"	7	7	6	7	5	32	5th
6	Ivan Jevtović	Davorin Popović of Indexi	"Bacila je sve niz rijeku"	5	5	7	5	5	27	6th
7	Aleksandra Bursać	Ceca	"Neodoljiv neumoljiv"	3	3	3	3	0	12	9th
8	Halid Bešlić	Željko Joksimović	"Lane Moje"	2	2	2	2	0	8	10th
9	Nenad Okanović	Saša Lošić of Plavi Orkestar	"Bolje biti pijan nego star"	4	4	4	4	5	21	8th
10	Čipi	Led Zeppelin	"Stairway To Heaven"	6	6	5	9	0	26	7th

Bonus points

- Elena Risteska gave five points to Bane Mojićević
- Bane Mojićević gave five points to Katarina Bogićević
- Katarina Bogićević gave five points to Nenad Okanović
- Neda Ukraden gave five points to Jelena Gavrilović
- Jelena Gavrilović gave five points to Neda Ukraden
- Ivan Jevtović gave five points to Katarina Bogićević
- Aleksandra Bursać gave five points to Bane Mojićević
- Halid Bešlić gave five points to Ivan Jevtović
- Nenad Okanović gave five points to Katarina Bogićević
- Zvonko Pantović gave five points to Katarina Bogićević

=== Week 3 (October 26) ===
- Guest Judge: Slađana Milošević
- Winner: Dragan Kojić Keba

Order	Celebrity	Performing as	Song	Points (judges and contestants)					Total	Result
Order	Celebrity	Performing as	Song	Slađana	Ivan	Branko	Marija	Bonus	Total	Result
1	Jelena Gavrilović	Taylor Swift	"I Knew You Were Trouble"	10	8	7	10	5	40	2nd
2	Neda Ukraden	Silvana Armenulić	"Ciganine, sviraj, sviraj"	8	2	4	3	0	17	9th
3	Halid Bešlić	Paul Stanley of Kiss	"I Was Made for Lovin' You"	12	9	9	7	15	52	1st (Winner)
4	Nenad Okanović	Dado Topić of Time	"Floyd" / "Princeza" / "Amsterdam"	5	12	12	8	0	37	4th
5	Čipi	Slađana Milošević	"Floyd" / "Princeza" / "Amsterdam"	9	5	5	6	10	35	6th
6	Katarina Bogićević	Justin Bieber	"Baby"	3	6	6	4	0	19	8th
7	Ivan Jevtović	Dragan Kojić Keba	"Imao sam" / "Bri gidi džanum"	7	7	10	9	5	38	3rd
8	Bane Mojićević	John Travolta	"Greased Lightning"	6	10	8	12	0	36	5th
9	Elena Risteska	Nina Badrić	"Takvi kao ti"	4	3	2	2	15	26	7th
10	Aleksandra Bursać	Goran Šepa of Kerber	"Bolje da sam druge ljubio"	2	4	3	5	0	14	10th

Bonus points

- Jelena Gavrilović gave five points to Elena Risteska
- Neda Ukraden gave five points to Halid Bešlić
- Halid Bešlić gave five points to Čipi
- Nenad Okanović gave five points to Elena Risteska
- Čipi gave five points to Ivan Jevtović
- Katarina Bogićević gave five points to Jelena Gavrilović
- Ivan Jevtović gave five points to Čipi
- Bane Mojićević gave five points to Elena Risteska
- Elena Risteska gave five points to Halid Bešlić
- Aleksandra Bursać gave five points to Halid Bešlić

=== Week 4 (November 2) ===
- Guest Judge: Tonči Huljić
- Winner: Nenad Okanović

Order	Celebrity	Performing as	Song	Points (judges and contestants)					Total	Result
Order	Celebrity	Performing as	Song	Tonči	Ivan	Branko	Marija	Bonus	Total	Result
1	Elena Risteska	Christina Aguilera	"Lotus" / "Army of Me" / "Let There Be Love"	5	8	8	5	0	26	8th
2	Bane Mojićević	Toma Zdravković	"Da l' je moguće"	4	6	4	4	0	18	9th
3	Katarina Bogićević	Emmy Rossum	"The Phantom of the Opera"	9	10	10	8	5	42	2nd
4	Ivan Jevtović	Gerard Butler	"The Phantom of the Opera"	7	7	6	7	5	32	6th
5	Neda Ukraden	Till Lindemann of Rammstein	"Du hast"	12	9	12	3	0	36	4th
6	Čipi	Sergej Ćetković	"Pogledi u tami"	2	2	3	2	5	14	10th
7	Halid Bešlić	Zorica Brunclik	"Košava"	10	12	9	6	0	37	3rd
8	Jelena Gavrilović	Sinéad O'Connor	"Nothing Compares 2 U"	8	3	5	12	5	33	5th
9	Aleksandra Bursać	Ivana Peters of Negative	"Zbunjena"	6	5	2	10	5	28	7th
10	Nenad Okanović	Louis Armstrong	"What a Wonderful World"	3	4	7	9	25	48	1st (Winner)

Bonus points

- Elena Risteska gave five points to Jelena Gavrilović
- Bane Mojićević gave five points to Nenad Okanović
- Katarina Bogićević gave five points to Ivan Jevtović
- Ivan Jevtović gave five points to Nenad Okanović
- Neda Ukraden gave five points to Biljana Sečivanović
- Čipi gave five points to Nenad Okanović
- Keba gave five points to Nenad Okanović
- Jelena Gavrilović gave five points to Nenad Okanović
- Aleksandra Bursać gave five points to Katarina Bogićević
- Nenad Okanović gave five points to Čipi

=== Week 5 (November 9) ===
- Guest Judge: Marko Janjić and Tanja Bošković
- Winner: Elena Risteska

Order	Celebrity	Performing as	Song	Points (judges and contestants)					Total	Result
Order	Celebrity	Performing as	Song	Marko	Ivan	Tanja	Marija	Bonus	Total	Result
1	Neda Ukraden	Bora Đorđević of Riblja Čorba	"Dva dinara druže"	2	2	3	3	5	15	10th
2	Bane Mojićević	Metallica	"Nothing Else Matters" / "Enter Sandman"	10	9	2	8	5	34	4th
3	Jelena Gavrilović	Vesna Zmijanac	"Malo pomalo"	5	10	7	5	0	27	7th
4	Katarina Bogićević	Psy	"Gangnam Style"	12	8	8	7	5	40	3rd
5	Aleksandra Bursać	Dragana Mirković	"Pitaju me u mom kraju"	6	6	10	9	0	31	5th
6	Dragan Kojić Keba	The Blues Brothers	"Everybody Needs Somebody to Love"	3	4	5	6	0	18	8th
7	Nenad Okanović	The Blues Brothers	"Everybody Needs Somebody to Love"	4	5	4	4	0	17	9th
8	Čipi	Alen Islamović of Bijelo Dugme	"Ružica si bila"	9	7	12	12	5	45	2nd
9	Elena Risteska	Jennifer Lopez	"Booty"	8	12	9	10	20	59	1st (Winner)
10	Ivan Jevtović	Bajaga of Bajaga i Instruktori	"Zažmuri" / "Vesela pesma"	7	3	6	2	10	28	6th

Bonus points

- Neda Ukraden gave five points to Elena Risteska
- Bane Mojićević gave five points to Čipi
- Jelena Gavrilović gave five points to Ivan Jevtović
- Katarina Bogićević gave five points to Elena Risteska
- Aleksandra Bursać gave five points to Ivan Jevtović
- Keba gave five points to Elena Risteska
- Nenad Okanović gave five points to Katarina Bogićević
- Čipi gave five points to Elena Risteska
- Elena Risteska gave five points to Neda Ukraden
- Ivan Jevtović gave five points to Bane Mojićević

=== Week 6 (November 16) ===
- Guest Judge: Niggor
- Winner: Branislav Mojićević

Order	Celebrity	Performing as	Song	Points (judges and contestants)					Total	Result
Order	Celebrity	Performing as	Song	Niggor	Ivan	Branko	Marija	Bonus	Total	Result
1	Neda Ukraden	Princess Fiona	"I'm a Believer"	12	3	7	4	5	31	4th
2	Aleksandra Bursać	Shrek	"I'm a Believer"	2	5	6	5	0	18	9th
3	Katarina Bogićević	Jelena Tomašević	"Okeani"	5	4	2	2	0	13	10th
4	Čipi	Bruno Mars	"Marry You"	4	6	8	3	0	21	7th
5	Elena Risteska	Haris Džinović	"Kako mi nedostaješ" / "Rano je za tugu" / "Čija je ono zvijezda"	8	2	3	6	0	19	8th
6	Bane Mojićević	Zdravko Čolić	"Kako mi nedostaješ" / "Rano je za tugu" / "Čija je ono zvijezda"	9	12	12	7	30	70	1st (Winner)
7	Ivan Jevtović	Chris Brown	"Yeah 3x" / "Beautiful People"	7	10	10	12	10	49	2nd
8	Nenad Okanović	Dubioza Kolektiv	"Volio BiH" / "Walter"	6	7	5	9	0	27	6th
9	Jelena Gavrilović	Indila	"Dernière danse"	3	8	4	8	5	28	5th
10	Dragan Kojić Keba	Mišo Kovač	"Ostala si uvijek ista"	10	9	9	10	0	38	3rd

Bonus points

- Neda Ukraden gave five points to Darko Martinović
- Aleksandra Bursać gave five points to Neda Ukraden
- Katarina Bogićević gave five points to Darko Martinović
- Zvonko Pantović gave five points to Darko Martinović
- Elena Risteska gave five points to Ivan Jevtović
- Bane Mojićević gave five points to Ivan Jevtović
- Ivan Jevtović gave five points to Jelena Gavrilović
- Nenad Okanović gave five points to Bane Mojićević
- Jelena Gavrilović gave five points to Darko Martinović
- Dragan Kojić Keba gave five points to Darko Martinović

=== Week 7 (November 23) ===
- Guest Judge: Željko Joksimović
- Winner: Zvonko Pantović Čipi

Order	Celebrity	Performing as	Song	Points (judges and contestants)					Total	Result
Order	Celebrity	Performing as	Song	Željko	Ivan	Branko	Marija	Bonus	Total	Result
1	Katarina Bogićević	Ariana Grande	"Break Free" / "Anaconda" / "Do It Like A Dude" / "Bang Bang"	5	8	6	8	0	27	4th
2	Nenad Okanović	Nicki Minaj	"Break Free" / "Anaconda" / "Do It Like A Dude" / "Bang Bang"	2	5	4	6	0	17	9th
3	Elena Risteska	Jessie J	"Break Free" / "Anaconda" / "Do It Like A Dude" / "Bang Bang"	3	7	7	7	0	24	6th
4	Ivan Jevtović	Kiki Lesendrić of Piloti	"Svet je lep kada sanjamo" / "Nemirne noći" / "Od milijun žena" / "Zabluda"	4	6	5	4	0	19	8th
5	Aleksandra Bursać	Toni Cetinski & Željko Joksimović	"Svet je lep kada sanjamo" / "Nemirne noći" / "Od milijun žena" / "Zabluda"	9	9	8	10	20	56	2nd
6	Neda Ukraden	Šaban Šaulić	"Dođi da ostarimo zajedno"	7	4	10	5	0	26	5th
7	Keba	Beogradski Sindikat	"Balada disidenta" / "Govedina"	8	2	2	3	0	15	10th
8	Čipi	The Full Monty	"Let It Go"	10	3	9	12	30	64	1st (Winner)
9	Jelena Gavrilović	Tozovac	"Ovamo cigani" / "Of Jano, Jano"	12	12	12	9	0	45	3rd
10	Bane Mojićević	Conchita Wurst	"Rise Like a Phoenix"	6	10	3	2	0	21	7th

Bonus points

- Katarina Bogićević gave five points to Zvonko Pantović Čipi
- Nenad Okanović gave five points to Zvonko Pantović Čipi
- Elena Risteska gave five points to Zvonko Pantović Čipi
- Ivan Jevtović gave five points to Aleksandra Bursać
- Aleksandra Bursać gave five points to Zvonko Pantović Čipi
- Neda Ukraden gave five points to Aleksandra Bursać
- Dragan Kojić Keba gave five points to
- Zvonko Pantović gave five points to Vanja Mijatović
- Jelena Gavrilović gave five points to Zvonko Pantović Čipi
- Bane Mojićević gave five points to Zvonko Pantović Čipi

=== Week 8 (November 30) ===
- Guest Judge: Ivan Bosiljčić
- Winner: Jelena Gavrilović

Order	Celebrity	Performing as	Song	Points (judges and contestants)					Total	Result
Order	Celebrity	Performing as	Song	Ivan B.	Ivan	Branko	Marija	Bonus	Total	Result
1	Aleksandra Bursać	Zona Zamfirova	"Puče puška" / "Lele Zone"	3	5	5	5	0	18	6th
2	Bane Mojićević	Zona Zamfirova	"Puče puška" / "Lele Zone"	4	6	4	4	0	18	6th
3	Ivan Jevtović	Marilyn Monroe	"Diamonds Are a Girl's Best Friend"	10	12	6	10	5	43	3rd
4	Katarina Bogićević	Josipa Lisac	"Danas sam luda" / "Đelem, đelem" / "Geljan Dade"	7	3	3	3	0	16	9th
5	Keba	Šaban Bajramović	"Danas sam luda" / "Đelem, đelem" / "Geljan Dade"	6	8	7	7	5	33	5th
6	Jelena Gavrilović	Pink	"Glitter in the Air"	12	10	8	12	25	67	1st (Winner)
7	Čipi	Alen Ademović of Miligram	"Vrati mi se nesrećo"	5	2	2	6	0	15	10th
8	Neda Ukraden	Tina Turner	"Simply The Best"	9	9	12	9	10	49	2nd
9	Elena Risteska	Esma Redžepova	"Zajdi zajdi"	8	7	10	8	5	38	4th
10	Nenad Okanović	Kurt Cobain of Nirvana	"Smells like teen spirit"	2	4	9	2	0	17	8th

Bonus points

- Aleksandra Bursać gave five points to Jelena Gavrilović
- Bane Mojićević gave five points to Jelena Gavrilović
- Ivan Jevtović gave five points to Elena Risteska
- Katarina Bogićević gave five points to Jelena Gavrilović
- Dragan Kojić Keba gave five points to Neda Ukraden
- Jelena Gavrilović gave five points to Dragan Kojić Keba
- Zvonko Pantović gave five points to Neda Ukraden
- Neda Ukraden gave five points to Jelena Gavrilović
- Elena Risteska gave five points to Jelena Gavrilović
- Nenad Okanović gave five points to Ivan Jevtović

=== Week 9 (December 7) ===
- Guest Judge: Kaliopi
- Winner: Aleksandra Bursać

Order	Celebrity	Performing as	Song	Points (judges and contestants)					Total	Result
Order	Celebrity	Performing as	Song	Kaliopi	Ivan	Branko	Marija	Bonus	Total	Result
1	Ivan Jevtović	Robbie Williams	"Candy"	4	5	8	10	0	27	5th
2	Katarina Bogićević	Merima Njegomir	"Ivanova korita"	3	3	2	2	0	10	10th
3	Keba	Gene Kelly	"Singin' In The Rain"	8	10	9	5	0	32	4th
4	Neda Ukraden	Kaliopi	"Crno i belo"	12	9	10	12	0	43	2nd
5	Aleksandra Bursać	Rihanna	"Love The Way You Lie (Part II)" / "What's My Name" / "Only Girl (In The World)”	7	6	6	8	45	72	1st (Winner)
6	Bane Mojićević	Justin Timberlake	"Mirrors" / "Bye Bye Bye"	9	7	4	3	0	23	7th
7	Elena Risteska	Oliver Dragojević	"Cesarica"	6	4	3	4	5	22	8th
8	Nenad Okanović	Marchelo	"Pegla"	10	12	12	9	0	43	2nd
9	Čipi	Axl Rose of Guns N' Roses	"Sweet Child O'Mine"	2	2	5	6	0	15	9th
9	Jelena Gavrilović	Axl Rose of Guns N' Roses	"Sweet Child O'Mine"	5	8	7	7	0	27	5th

Bonus points

- All the contestants gave five points to Aleksandra Bursać, while Aleksandra Bursać gave five points to Elena Risteska.

=== Week 10 (December 14) ===
- Guest Judge: Danica Maksimović
- Winner: Ivan Jevtović

Order	Celebrity	Performing as	Song	Points (judges and contestants)					Total	Result
Order	Celebrity	Performing as	Song	Danica	Ivan	Branko	Marija	Bonus	Total	Result
1	Katarina Bogićević	Shakira	"Empire"	8	6	8	4	0	26	7th
2	Nenad Okanović	Charlie Chaplin	"Je cherche après Titine" / "The Nonsense Song"	7	10	12	10	5	44	2nd
3	Bane Mojićević	Dino Merlin	"Kad si rekla da me voliš"	12	12	10	9	0	43	3rd
4	Jelena Gavrilović	Michael Jackson	"Smooth Criminal" / "Dangerous" / "Beat It"	5	3	6	8	5	27	6th
5	Neda Ukraden	Ksenija Cicvarić	"Moj dilbere"	9	9	9	6	0	33	4th
6	Ivan Jevtović	The Rocky Horror Picture Show	"Sweet Transvestite"	10	4	7	12	20	53	1st (Winner)
7	Čipi	The Rocky Horror Picture Show	"Sweet Transvestite"	2	2	5	5	5	19	9th
8	Elena Risteska	Maria Callas	"Habanera"	4	8	4	7	5	28	5th
9	Aleksandra Bursać	Madonna	"Beautiful Killer"	6	7	3	3	5	24	8th
10	Keba	Cune Gojković	"Janičar"	3	5	2	2	5	17	10th

Bonus points

- Katarina Bogićević gave five points to Ivan Jevtović
- Nenad Okanović gave five points to Ivan Jevtović
- Bane Mojićević gave five points to Jelena Gavrilović
- Jelena Gavrilović gave five points to Elena Risteska
- Neda Ukraden Keba gave five points to Ivan Jevtović
- Ivan Jevtović gave five points to Zvonko Pantović
- Zvonko Pantović gave five points to Ivan Jevtović
- Elena Risteska gave five points to Nenad Okanović
- Aleksandra Bursać gave five points to Dragan Kojić Keba
- Dragan Kojić Keba gave five points to Aleksandra Bursać

=== Semi-final (December 21) ===
- Guest Judge: Konstantin Kostjukov
- Winner: Katarina Bogićević

Order	Celebrity	Performing as	Song	Points (judges and contestants)						Total	Result
Order	Celebrity	Performing as	Song	Konstantin Kostjukov	Ivan	Branko	Marija	Bonus	Public vote	Total	Result
1	Čipi	Muse	"Supremacy"	3	2	9	10	0	2	24	8th (Eliminated)
2	Neda Ukraden	Madonna	"La Isla Bonita"	5	5	6	7	0	7	23	9th (Eliminated)
3	Katarina Bogićević	Christina Perri	"Human"	12	12	8	9	10	9	51	1st (Winner) (Finalist)
4	Jelena Gavrilović	Florence Welch of Florence and the Machine	"No Light, No Light"	10	7	4	3	15	4	39	2nd (Finalist)
5	Bane Mojićević	Aca Lukas	"Pesma od bola" / "Ne zanosim se ja"	9	10	3	2	10	12	34	4th (Finalist)
6	Elena Risteska	Sia	"Chandelier"	4	4	2	6	5	10	21	10th (Finalist)
7	Halid Bešlić	Lady Gaga	"Born This Way"	2	9	12	8	0	3	31	5th (Eliminated)
8	Aleksandra Bursać	Neda Ukraden	"Zora je"	8	3	5	5	5	5	26	7th (Eliminated)
9	Ivan Jevtović	Stromae	"Papaoutai"	6	6	7	4	5	6	28	6th (Eliminated)
10	Nenad Okanović	Rambo Amadeus	"Halid Invalid Hari" / "Kako se zapravo pravi hit"	7	8	10	12	0	8	37	3rd (Finalist)

=== Final (December 28) ===
- Series winner: Darko Martinović

Order	Celebrity	Performing as	Song	Result
1	Katarina Bogićević	Cinderella	"In My Own Little Corner" / "Impossible" / "Ten Minutes Ago" / "Life is Great"	3rd
2	Nenad Okanović	Nele Karajlić	"Ženi nam se Vukota"	5th
3	Elena Risteska	Beyoncé	"End of time"	2nd
4	Bane Mojićević	Michael Jackson	"Earth Song"	Series winner
5	Jelena Gavrilović	Miley Cyrus	"Wrecking Ball"	4th
6	Čipi	Snežana Babić Sneki	"Takni me, takni"	X
7	Ivan Jevtović	James Brown	"Get Up (I Feel Like Being a) Sex Machine" / "Say It Loud – I'm Black and I'm Proud" / "I Got You (I Feel Good)"	X
8	Aleksandra Bursać	Marija Šerifović	"Ja volim svoj greh"	X
9	Halid Bešlić	Freddie Mercury	"I Want to Break Free"	X
10	Neda Ukraden	ABBA	"The winner takes it all"	X
11	Gru	Shakin' Stevens	"Merry Christmas Everyone"	X

== Notes ==
1.Jelena Gavrilović and Neda Ukraden performed as Chicago (the musical) together.
2.Nenad Okanović and Čipi performed "Princeza" together.
3.Katarina Bogićević and Ivan Jevtović as Andrew Lloyd Webber's opera The Phantom of the Opera performed together.
4.In the fifth week, there were two visiting members of the jury as Branko Đuric was in Australia, due to work.
5.During Katarina Bogićević's performance as Psy, presenter Bojan Ivković appeared as MC Hammer (deriving from MC Hammer's guest appearance during the American Music Award in 2012).
6.Keba and Nenad Okanović performed together as Dan Aykroyd and John Belushi in The Blues Brothers.
7.Neda Ukraden and Tanja Savić performed together singing "I'm a Believer" from the animated movie Shrek.
8.Elena Risteska and Branislav Mojićević performed "Rano je za tugu" together.
9.During Nenad Okanović's performance, presenter Bojan Ivković appeared as the second singer of Dubioza kolektiv.
