= Tvoje lice zvuči poznato (Serbian TV series) =

Serbian talent show

- Genre: Reality television
- Based on: Tu cara me suena by Gestmusic
- Presented by: Marija Kilibarda; Petar Strugar; Bojan Ivković; Nina Seničar
- Judges: Katarina Radivojević; Marija Mihajlović; Ivan Ivanović; Branko Đurić; Ana Kokić; Vlado Georgiev; Andrija Milošević; Aleksandra Radović; Uroš Đurić; Dubravka Mijatović; Dušan Alagić
- Country of origin: Serbia
- No. of seasons: 5
- No. of episodes: 60

Production
- Producer: Emotion
- Running time: 180 minutes
- Production companies: Emotion Production; Absolutely Independent

Original release
- Network: Prva TV; RTRS; FTV
- Release: 12 October 2013 – 20 December 2019

Related
- Your Face Sounds Familiar

Tvoje Lice Zvuči Poznato (Serbian: Твоје лице звучи познато; Macedonian: Твоето лице звучи познато) is a Serbian talent show based on the Spanish franchise Your Face Sounds Familiar. The show premiered 12 October 2013 on Prva TV. It involves ten celebrities (singers, actors, TV personalities, and sportsmen) portraying various iconic singers every week to win a financial donation for their chosen charity.

== Series overview ==
Season	Premiere date	Final date	No. of stars	No. of weeks	Celebrity honor places		Judges
Season	Premiere date	Final date	No. of stars	No. of weeks	Winner	Second place	Judges
1	12 October 2013	28 December 2013	10	12	Ana Kokić	Sara Jovanović	Ivan Ivanović; Katarina Radivojević; Marija Mihajlović
2	12 October 2014	28 December 2014	10	12	Bane Mojićević	Elena Risteska	Ivan Ivanović; Branko Đurić; Marija Mihajlović
3	6 March 2016	22 May 2016	10	12	Daniel Kajmakoski	Nikola Rokvić	Ivan Ivanović; Vlado Georgiev; Ana Kokić
4	1 October 2017	17 December 2017	10	12	Stevan Anđelković	Tijana Dapčević	Andrija Milošević; Branko Đurić; Aleksandra Radović
5	4 October 2019	20 December 2019	10	12	Daniel Kajmakoski; Ivana Peters	Željko Šašić; Knez	Uroš Đurić; Dušan Alagić; Dubravka Mijatović

== Overall results of the show ==
- One of the participants had the honor of portraying one of the members of the jury, speaking directly in front of him:

In season 1, Goca Tržan performed in the image of Dragana Mirković (who gave 4 points), Tamara Dragičević performed in the image of Severina (who gave 5 points), Aleksa Jelić performed in the image of Miroslav Ilić (who gave 7 points) and Nataša Bekvalac (who gave 10 points), Wikluh Sky performed in the image of Marija Šerifović (who gave 10 points), Boris Milivojević performed in the image of Tony Cetinski (who gave 3 points). In season 2, Zvonko Pantović Čipi performed in the image of Slađana Milošević (who gave 9 points), Biljana Sečivanović performed in the image of Željko Joksimović (who gave 9 points), Neda Ukraden performed in the image of Kaliopi (who gave maximum 12 points). In season 3, Bogoljub Mitić Đoša performed in the image of Knez (who gave 5 points) and Dragana Mirković (who gave minimum 2 points), Dara Bubamara performed in the image of Vlado Georgiev (who gave 9 points), Lepa Brena (who gave 6 points) and Aca Lukas (who gave 7 points), Katarina Ostojić Kaya performed in the image of Željko Joksimović (who gave 10 points). In season 4, Ivan Paunić performed in the image of Jelena Karleuša (who gave maximum 12 points), Mira Škorić performed in the image of Marija Šerifović (who gave maximum 12 points).

- Some participants portrayed their "colleagues":

In season 1, Boris Milivojević performed in the image of Ana Kokić, Wikluh Sky performed in the image of Željko Šašić, who performed in the image of Snežana Babić Sneki and Goca Tržan performed in the image of Knez. In season 2, Ivan Jevtović performed in the image of Dragan Kojić Keba, Biljana Sečivanović performed in the image of Neda Ukraden. In season 3, Katarina Ostojić Kaya performed in the image of Ivana Peters, who performed in the image of Halid Muslimović, Neša Bridžis performed in the image of Dara Bubamara. In season 4, Mira Škorić performed in the image of Edita Aradinović, who performed in the image of Tijana Dapčević, who performed in the image of Bebi Dol. In season 5, Knez and Ivana Peters, Keba and Ana Kokić, Edita Aradinović and Željko Šašić performed in the image of each other.

== See also ==
- Survivor Srbija
- Ples sa zvezdama
