= Snežana Babić =

Serbian singer and actress

Snežana Babić Снежана Бабић
- Also known as: Sneki
- Born: 1 October 1967 (age 58); Pančevo, SR Serbia, SFR Yugoslavia
- Origin: Serbia
- Genres: Folk
- Occupations: Singer; actress
- Instrument: Vocals
- Years active: 1988–present
- Labels: PGP-RTB (PGP-RTS); Diskos; Južni Vetar; ZaM; Grand Production

Snežana Babić (Serbian Cyrillic: Снежана Бабић; born 1 October 1967), better known as Sneki, is a Serbian singer. Born in Pančevo, she made her recording debut in 1988. Sneki had a memorable performance of the song "Moje vruće haljine" in the fourth instalment of the movie Tesna Koža (1991) alongside actor Milan Gutović in the lead role. In 2020, Babić was honored with the Life Achievement Award from the Union of the Musical Artists of Serbia (SEMUS).

Additionally, in 2013, Sneki participated in the first season of the reality competition show Tvoje lice zvuči poznato.

Outside her singing career, she is also known for her 1.25 m (4 ft 1 in) long legs, that were allegedly insured at one million euros each in 2009.

== Discography ==
Studio albums

- Neka stari ko voleti ne zna (1988)
- Il ne da đavo il ne da bog (1989)
- Pijmo (1990)
- Hopa cupa (1991)
- Ljubav je naša božja volja (1992)
- Ne traži me kad ti loše ide (1993)
- Igračka (1994)
- Sve mi ravno do Kosova (1995)
- Čaša greha (1997)
- Caki Cale (1998)
- Majko (1999)
- Hajmo Jovo na novo (2001)
- Par sati (2005)

== Filmography ==
Filmography of Snežana Babić
Year	Title	Genre	Role	Notes
1991	Tesna koža 4	Film	Herself	
1994	Novogodišnja priča	Film	Herself	
2013	Tvoje lice zvuči poznato	Television	Herself	Season 1, 9th place
