= Knez (singer) =

Knez Кнез
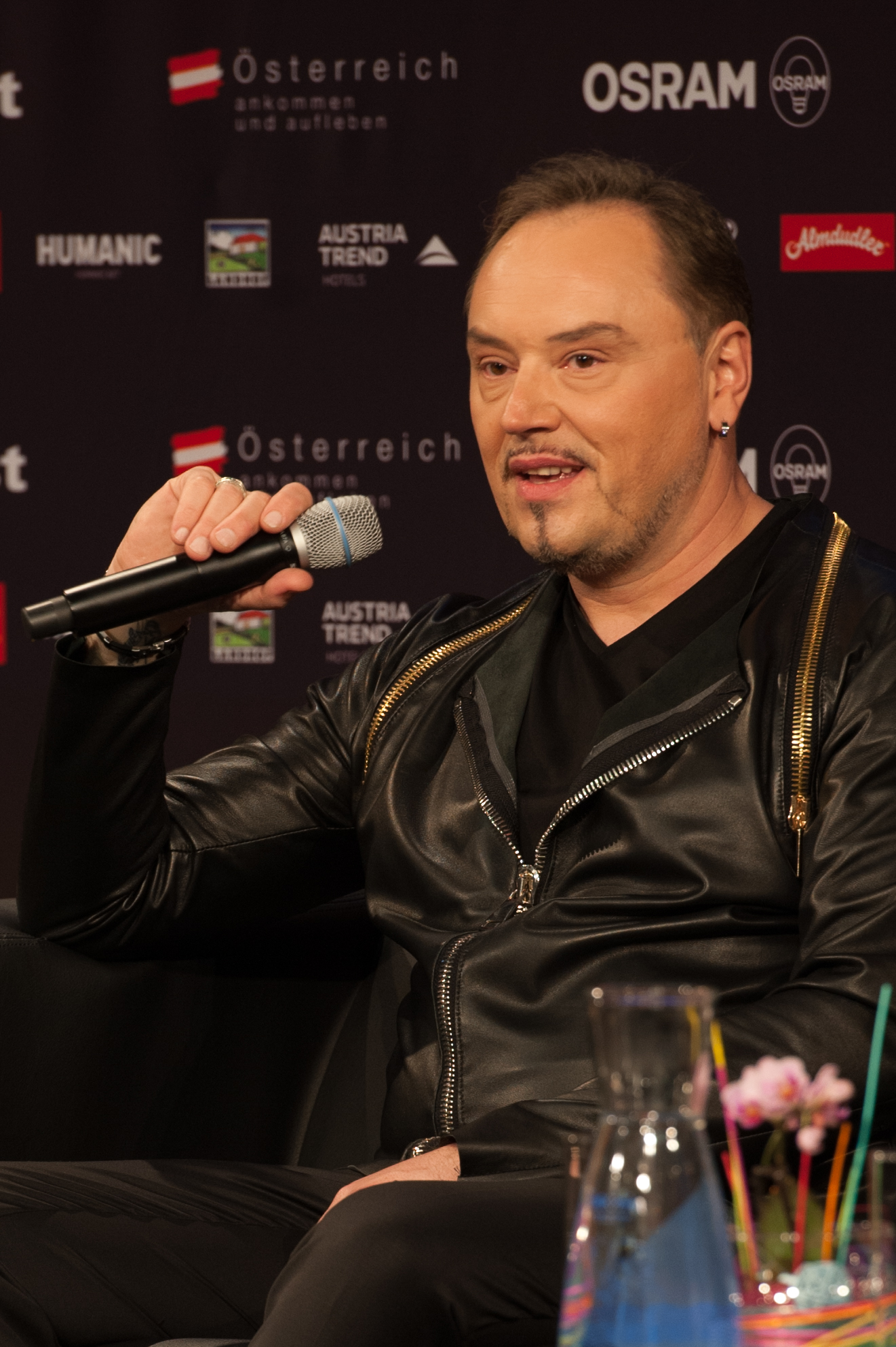
- Knez in 2015

Background information
- Also known as: Knez
- Born: Nenad Knežević; 5 December 1967 (age 58); Titograd, SR Montenegro, Yugoslavia
- Genres: Dance-pop; adult contemporary
- Occupation: Singer-songwriter
- Instrument: Vocals
- Years active: 1992–present (solo career)
- Labels: PGP-RTS (1994–1996); ZAM (1996); City Records (2000–present)
- Website: www.knezofficial.me

Nenad Knežević (Serbian Cyrillic: Ненад Кнежевић; born 5 December 1967), better known as Knez, is a Montenegrin singer, based in Belgrade, Serbia. Best known for his 1994 hit "Dal' si ikada mene voljela" (Have You Ever Loved Me), he rose to fame as a 1990s dance-pop singer. Knez also represented Montenegro in the Eurovision Song Contest 2015 with "Adio", finishing 13th out of 27 countries, the best result Montenegro has ever achieved at the contest.

Additionally, he appeared on the reality TV shows Survivor Srbija VIP: Philippines (2010) and Tvoje lice zvuči poznato seasons one (2013) and five (2019).

== Life and career ==
=== Early years ===
He was born and grew up in Titograd (now Podgorica) in a family of musicians. At six years of age, Knez sang "Bio jednom jedan lav" on the Naša Radost Festival in Titograd. He was schooled in the same city. After high school, he was a member of group "Milan i Luna". Whilst in high school, he started his first band, Visoka frekvencija (English: High Frequency), with guitarist Leo Đokaj. With the band, he wrote the songs "Da l' si ikada mene voljela" and "Kao magija" that would later become his greatest hits. Later, he established The Moon Band, which played on the Montenegrin coast, and subsequently the "Montenegro Band" with his father, Milija Mili Knežević.

=== Career ===
In 1992, Knez began his solo career and appeared at the Belgrade Pop Festival, MESAM, with the song, "Da l' si ikada mene voljela". In that same year, Knez recorded his first album, Kao magija, with the help of former band member, guitarist Leo Đokaj and songwriters, Ljubo Jovović and Zlatko Jovović. In 1994, Knez recorded his second album, Iz dana u dan. In 1996, Knez recorded his third album, Automatic. This album was the highest-selling album. The biggest concert he had in his career was in Sava Center. In 1999, a compilation was released under the name, The Best of Knez, which included 18 old songs, 2 new songs, "Nijedna žena na svijetu" and "Ti ne znaš ko sam ja", and a remix of "Kao magija". In 2000, he competed in the Budva 2000 Festival with the song, Vjeruj, which won the first place. In 2001, Knez recorded his fourth album, Daleko, visoko. In 2003, Knez recorded his fifth album, Ti me znaš. He won the third place at the Music Festival Budva 2006. In 2005, Knez recorded his sixth album, Vanilla.

On 31 October 2014, it was officially announced that Knez would represent Montenegro at Eurovision Song Contest 2015 in Vienna, Austria. Performing in Montenegrin with his song "Adio", Knez came ninth in the second semi-final, and ranked 13th in the Grand Final with 44 points, making this, up to date, Montenegro's most successful entry. Song Adio has two versions, in French and English. English version is written by Milica Fajgelj, Tami Rodriguez, Nicole Rodriguez and Dunja Vujadinovic.

Knežević collaborated with actor and academic Branislav Lečić on the popular Bubamara ballad.

=== Personal life ===
Between 1995 and 2013 he was married to Ninoslava Knežević, with whom he has two daughters, one of which is Ksenija Knežević who was a member of the girl group Hurricane (2017-2022).

== Discography ==
Studio albums

- Kao magija (1994)
- Iz dana u dan (1996)
- Automatic (1997)
- Daleko, visoko (2000)
- Ti me znaš (2003)
- Vanilla (2005)
- Otrov i med (2008)
- Opa cupa (2012)

Compilations

- The Best of Knez (1999)
- Balade (2006)

== Awards and nominations ==
Year	Award	Category	Nominee(s)	Result	Ref.
2025	Montefon Awards	Male singer of the year	Himself	Won	

Awards and achievements
Preceded by Sergej Ćetković with "Moj svijet"	Montenegro in the Eurovision Song Contest; 2015	Succeeded by Highway with "The Real Thing"
