= Tvoje lice zvuči poznato (Serbian TV series) season 1 =

Tvoje lice zvuči poznato
- Season 1
- Presented by: Marija Kilibarda; Petar Strugar
- Judges: Katarina Radivojević; Marija Mihajlović; Ivan Ivanović; Guest judge
- No. of contestants: 10
- Winner: Ana Kokić
- Runner-up: Sara Jovanović

Release
- Original network: Prva Srpska Televizija
- Original release: 12 October – 28 December 2013

Season chronology
- Next → Season 2

Tvoje lice zvuči poznato 1 (Cyrillic: Твоје лице звучи познато) was the first season of the Serbian reality contest based on the international franchise Your Face Sounds Familiar. It broadcast between October 12 and December 28, 2013. The judging panel consisted of late night talk show host Ivan Ivanović, singer and vocal coach Marija Mihajlović, actress Katarina Radivojević and a different guest judge each week. The series was hosted by Marija Kilibarda and actor Petar Strugar. The show's winner was singer Ana Kokić.

== Format ==
The show challenges celebrities (singers and actors) to perform as different iconic music artists every week, which are chosen by the show's "Randomiser". They are then judged by the panel of celebrity judges including Ivan Ivanović, Katarina Radivojević and Marija Mihajlović. Each week, one celebrity guest judge joins Ivan, Katarina and Marija to make up the complete judging panel. Marija Mihajlović is also a voice coach. Each celebrity gets transformed into a different singer each week and performs an iconic song and dance routine well known by that particular singer. The 'randomiser' can choose any older or younger artist available in the machine, or even a singer of the opposite sex, or a deceased singer. Winner of each episode wins €1000, and winner of whole show wins €25000. All money goes to charity of winner's own choice. The show lasts 12 weeks.

=== Voting ===
The contestants are awarded points from the judges (and each other) based on their singing and dance routines. Judges give points from 2 to 12, with the exception of 11. After that, each contestant gives 5 points to a fellow contestant of their choice (known as "Bonus" points). In week 11 (semi-final week) and in week 12 (final week), viewers also vote via text messages. In week 11 (semi-final), all judges points from past weeks and from semi-final are made into points from 2 to 12 (without 11). Contestants with most judges points will get 12 points, second placed will get 10, third placed 9 and 10th placed will get only 2 points. After that, public votes will also be made into points from 2 to 12, again with the exception of 11. Contestant with most public votes will get 12 points, second placed 10 and 10th placed will get only 2. All those points will be summed up and five contestants with most points will go to final week. In final week, judges will not vote - contestant with most public vote will win the show.

== Contestants ==
Celebrity	Notability	Episode(s) won	Total score	Result
Ana Kokić	Singer	2nd, Final	388	Winner
Sara Jovanović	Singer and former Prvi glas Srbije contestant	10th	387	Runner-up
Aleksa Jelić	Singer and ballet dancer	6th, Semi-final	367	Second runner-up
Boris Milivojević	Actor	3rd	356	4th place
Nenad "Knez" Knežević	Singer	9th	355	5th place
Goca Tržan	Singer and former Tap 011 member	8th	349	6th place
Željko Šašić	Singer	4th	323	7th place
Wikluh Sky	Bad Copy rapper	7th	321	8th place
Snežana "Sneki" Babić	Singer	5th	306	9th place
Tamara Dragičević	Actress	1st	302	10th place

== Series overview ==
=== Week 1 (October 12) ===
- Guest Judge: Dragana Mirković
- Winner: Tamara Dragičević

Order	Celebrity	Performing as	Song	Points (judges and contestants)					Total	Result
Order	Celebrity	Performing as	Song	Dragana	Ivan	Katarina	Marija	Bonus	Total	Result
1	Željko Šašić	Bora Čorba of Riblja Čorba	"Pogledaj dom svoj, anđele"	9	4	3	5	0	21	9th
2	Sara Jovanović	Rihanna	"We Found Love"	6	10	10	3	0	29	7th
3	Goca Tržan	Dragana Mirković	"Umirem majko"	4	3	6	7	5	25	8th
4	Tamara Dragičević	Lady Gaga	"Applause"	5	12	12	10	10	49	1st (Winner)
5	Knez	Luis	"Moj život je moje blago"	12	5	5	6	10	38	2nd
6	Aleksa Jelić	Ceca	"Pusti me da raskinem sa njom"	7	9	7	12	0	35	4th
7	Sneki	Zdravko Čolić	"Glavo luda"	3	7	8	8	5	31	6th
8	Boris Milivojević	Magnifico	"Hir aj kam, hir aj go"	8	6	9	9	5	37	3rd
9	Ana Kokić	Slađana Milošević	"Miki, Miki"	2	2	2	4	5	15	10th
10	Wikluh Sky	Mick Jagger of The Rolling Stones	"(I Can't Get No) Satisfaction"	10	8	4	2	10	34	5th

Bonus points

- Željko Šašić gave five points to Knez
- Sara Jovanović gave five points to Tamara Dragičević
- Goca Tržan gave five points to Sneki
- Tamara Dragičević gave five points to Boris Milivojević
- Knez gave five points to Wikluh Sky
- Aleksa Jelić gave five points to Tamara Dragičević
- Sneki gave five points to Goca Tržan
- Boris Milivojević gave five points to Ana Kokić
- Ana Kokić gave five points to Wikluh Sky
- Wikluh Sky gave five points to Knez

=== Week 2 (October 19) ===
- Guest Judge: Severina
- Winner: Ana Kokić

Order	Celebrity	Performing as	Song	Points (judges and contestants)					Total	Result
Order	Celebrity	Performing as	Song	Severina	Ivan	Katarina	Marija	Bonus	Total	Result
1	Ana Kokić	Pink	"Sober"	10	12	12	12	20	66	1st (Winner)
2	Wikluh Sky	Šaban Bajramović	"Đelem, đelem"	9	5	4	5	0	23	7th
3	Knez	Josipa Lisac	"Gdje Dunav ljubi nebo"	12	10	10	6	5	43	2nd
4	Tamara Dragičević	Severina	"Tarapana"	5	7	5	8	0	25	6th
5	Željko Šašić	Dino Merlin & Vesna Zmijanac	"Kad zamirišu jorgovani"	3	8	3	3	0	17	10th
6	Aleksa Jelić	Toše Proeski	"Gromovi na duša"	8	9	7	9	5	38	3rd
7	Goca Tržan	Jennifer Lopez	"On the Floor"	7	6	9	7	5	34	4th
8	Boris Milivojević	Đorđe Balašević	"Ne lomite mi bagrenje"	2	3	6	2	5	18	9th
9	Sara Jovanović	Oliver Mandić	"Ljuljaj me nežno"	6	4	2	4	5	21	8th
10	Sneki	Jelena Karleuša	"Slatka mala"	4	2	8	10	5	29	5th

Bonus points

- Ana gave five points to Sara
- Wikluh Sky gave five points to Ana
- Knez gave five points to Goca
- Tamara gave five points to Aleksa
- Željko gave five points to Ana
- Aleksa gave five points to Ana
- Goca gave five points to Knez
- Boris gave five points to Sneki
- Sara gave five points to Ana
- Sneki gave five points to Boris

=== Week 3 (October 26) ===
- Guest Judge: Miroslav Ilić
- Winner: Boris Milivojević

Order	Celebrity	Performing as	Song	Points (judges and contestants)					Total	Result
Order	Celebrity	Performing as	Song	Miroslav	Ivan	Katarina	Marija	Bonus	Total	Result
1	Knez	Gibonni	"Libar"	6	2	2	2	0	12	10th
2	Sneki	Ajs Nigrutin	"I dalje me žele"	4	8	8	8	10	38	4th
3	Wikluh Sky	Gru	"I dalje me žele"	3	5	4	5	0	17	8th
4	Aleksa Jelić	Miroslav Ilić	"Polomiću čaše od kristala"	7	10	9	9	10	45	2nd
5	Goca Tržan	Džej	"Nedelja"	5	3	3	3	0	14	9th
6	Tamara Dragičević	Redfoo of LMFAO	"Sexy and I Know It"	8	7	7	4	0	26	7th
7	Ana Kokić	Psy	"Gentleman"	2	9	10	10	5	36	5th
8	Sara Jovanović	Milan Stanković	"Ovo je Balkan"	10	6	5	6	0	27	6th
9	Željko Šašić	Željko Bebek of Bijelo Dugme	"Sve će to, mila moja, prekriti ruzmarin, snjegovi i šaš"	12	4	6	7	15	44	3rd
10	Boris Milivojević	Tina Turner	"Proud Mary"	9	12	12	12	10	55	1st (Winner)

Bonus points

- Knez gave five points to Željko
- Wikluh Sky gave five points to Sneki
- Sneki gave five points to Aleksa
- Aleksa gave five points to Sneki
- Goca gave five points to Željko
- Tamara gave five points to Ana
- Ana gave five points to Boris
- Sara gave five points to Željko
- Željko gave five points to Boris
- Boris gave five points to Aleksa

=== Week 4 (November 2) ===
- Guest Judge: Savo Milošević
- Winner: Željko Šašić

Order	Celebrity	Performing as	Song	Points (judges and contestants)					Total	Result
Order	Celebrity	Performing as	Song	Savo	Ivan	Katarina	Marija	Bonus	Total	Result
1	Sara Jovanović	Britney Spears	"(I Can't Get No) Satisfaction" / "Oops!... I Did It Again"	6	8	8	10	10	42	3rd
2	Boris Milivojević	Elvis Presley	"My Way" / "Viva Las Vegas"	3	3	5	5	0	16	8th
3	Sneki	Viktorija	"Barakuda"	2	2	3	3	5	15	10th
4	Željko Šašić	Aca Lukas	"Lična karta"	12	12	10	12	5	51	1st (Winner)
5	Aleksa Jelić	Eros Ramazzotti	"Se bastasse una canzone"	7	4	2	2	0	15	10th
6	Ana Kokić	Luciano Pavarotti	"Se bastasse una canzone"	8	6	6	6	5	31	6th
7	Tamara Dragičević	Lepa Brena	"Sitnije, Cile, sitnije"	4	7	7	4	0	22	7th
8	Goca Tržan	Brian Johnson of AC/DC	"T.N.T."	10	9	9	9	5	42	3rd
9	Wikluh Sky	Will.I.Am	"Bang Bang"	5	10	12	8	10	45	2nd
10	Knez	Hari Varešanović of Hari Mata Hari	"Lejla"	9	5	4	7	10	35	5th

Bonus points

- Sara gave five points to Goca
- Boris gave five points to Knez
- Sneki gave five points to Wikluh Sky
- Željko gave five points to Sneki
- Aleksa gave five points to Sara
- Ana gave five points to Željko
- Tamara gave five points to Sara
- Goca gave five points to Ana
- Wikluh Sky gave five points to Knez
- Knez gave five points to Wikluh Sky

=== Week 5 (November 9) ===
- Guest Judge: Marija Šerifović
- Winner: Sneki

Order	Celebrity	Performing as	Song	Points (judges and contestants)					Total	Result
Order	Celebrity	Performing as	Song	Marija Šerifović	Ivan	Katarina	Marija Mihajlović	Bonus	Total	Result
1	Sneki	Madonna	"Like a Prayer"	9	8	12	12	20	61	1st (Winner)
2	Tamara Dragičević	Jelena Rozga	"Bižuterija"	5	5	7	6	0	23	7th
3	Wikluh Sky	Marija Šerifović	"Molitva"	10	9	8	10	5	42	3rd
4	Goca Tržan	Saša Lošić of Plavi orkestar	"Suada"	6	4	3	2	0	15	9th
5	Boris Milivojević	Halid Bešlić; Ivica Dačić)	"Miljacka"	12	12	10	8	5	47	2nd
6	Sara Jovanović	Aleksandra Radović	"Kao so u moru"	4	6	4	5	5	24	6th
7	Ana Kokić	Elton John	"Bohemian Rhapsody" / "We Will Rock You" / "Who Wants to Live Forever"	3	3	5	4	5	20	8th
8	Željko Šašić	Axl Rose	"Bohemian Rhapsody" / "We Will Rock You" / "Who Wants to Live Forever"	8	7	6	7	5	33	5th
9	Knez	Freddie Mercury	"Bohemian Rhapsody" / "We Will Rock You" / "Who Wants to Live Forever"	7	10	9	9	0	35	4th
10	Aleksa Jelić	Vlado Georgiev	"Nisam ljubomoran"	2	2	2	3	5	14	10th

Bonus points

- Sneki gave five points to Ana
- Tamara gave five points to Sneki
- Wikluh Sky gave five points to Željko
- Goca gave five points to Aleksa
- Aleksa gave five points to Wikluh Sky
- Boris gave five points to Sneki
- Sara gave five points to Sneki
- Željko gave five points to Sara
- Ana gave five points to Sneki
- Knez gave five points to Boris

=== Week 6 (November 16) ===
- Guest Judge: Bora Đorđević
- Winner: Aleksa Jelić

Order	Celebrity	Performing as	Song	Points (judges and contestants)					Total	Result
Order	Celebrity	Performing as	Song	Bora	Ivan	Katarina	Marija	Bonus	Total	Result
1	Tamara Dragičević	Laka	"Pokušaj"	8	4	3	6	0	21	8th
2	Boris Milivojević	Bajaga of Bajaga i Instruktori	"220 u voltima"	2	2	2	3	5	14	10th
3	Aleksa Jelić	Beyoncé	"Single Ladies"	12	10	10	12	15	59	1st (Winner)
4	Ana Kokić	Zaz	"Je veux"	10	9	9	10	0	38	4th
5	Sneki	Ana Bekuta	"Zlatiborske zore"	7	5	7	5	0	24	7th
6	Željko Šašić	Oliver Dragojević	"Nije htjela"	4	3	8	8	10	33	5th
7	Knez	Kemal Monteno	"Nije htjela"	9	12	12	9	0	42	2nd
8	Wikluh Sky	Robin Thicke	"We Can't Stop" / "Blurred Lines" / "Give It 2 U"	3	7	5	4	0	19	9th
9	Sara Jovanović	Miley Cyrus	"We Can't Stop" / "Blurred Lines" / "Give It 2 U"	6	8	4	2	5	25	6th
10	Goca Tržan	Cane of Partibrejkers	"Hoću da znam"	5	6	6	7	15	39	3rd

Bonus points

- Tamara gave five points to Aleksa
- Boris gave five points to Goca
- Aleksa gave five points to Goca
- Ana gave five points to Aleksa
- Sneki gave five points to Željko
- Knez gave five points to Željko
- Željko gave five points to Goca
- Wikluh Sky gave five points to Boris
- Sara gave five points to Aleksa
- Goca gave five points to Sara

=== Week 7 (November 23) ===
- Guest Judge: Tony Cetinski
- Winner: Wikluh Sky

Order	Celebrity	Performing as	Song	Points (judges and contestants)					Total	Result
Order	Celebrity	Performing as	Song	Tony	Ivan	Katarina	Marija	Bonus	Total	Result
1	Tamara Dragičević	Azra	"Ederlezi"	2	4	4	3	5	18	10th
2	Sneki	Gile of Električni orgazam	"Igra rokenrol cela Jugoslavija"	6	2	3	2	5	18	10th
3	Boris Milivojević	Tony Cetinski	"Blago onom tko te ima"	3	7	8	4	0	22	8th
4	Knez	Barbra Streisand	"Woman in Love"	4	10	10	10	5	39	3rd
5	Sara Jovanović	Bebi Dol	"Brazil"	9	5	5	6	0	25	5th
6	Aleksa Jelić	Jacek Koman	"Tango de Roxanne"	10	9	9	9	5	42	2nd
7	Wikluh Sky	Ewan McGregor	"Tango de Roxanne"	12	12	12	12	20	68	1st (Winner)
8	Željko Šašić	Alen Ademović of Miligram	"Kruška"	8	3	2	7	5	25	5th
9	Ana Kokić	Loreen	"Euphoria"	5	8	7	5	0	25	5th
10	Goca Tržan	Marina Perazić of Denis & Denis	"Kolačići"	7	6	6	8	5	32	4th

Bonus points

- Tamara gave five points to Wikluh Sky
- Sneki gave five points to Tamara
- Boris gave five points to Željko
- Knez gave five points to Wikluh Sky
- Sara gave five points to Wikluh Sky
- Aleksa gave five points to Knez
- Wikluh Sky gave five points to Aleksa
- Željko gave five points to Sneki
- Ana gave five points to Goca
- Goca gave five points to Wikluh Sky

=== Week 8 (November 30) ===
- Guest Judge: Sergej Trifunović
- Winner: Goca Tržan

Order	Celebrity	Performing as	Song	Points (judges and contestants)					Total	Result
Order	Celebrity	Performing as	Song	Sergej	Ivan	Katarina	Marija	Bonus	Total	Result
1	Goca Tržan	Christina Aguilera	"Show Me How You Burlesque"	9	10	12	12	20	63	1st (Winner)
2	Wikluh Sky	Aki Rahimovski of Parni Valjak	"Jesen u meni"	8	4	3	3	0	18	9th
3	Sara Jovanović	Shakira	"Loca" / "Waka Waka (This Time for Africa)"	10	2	9	9	10	40	3rd
4	Ana Kokić	Kaliopi	"Rođeni"	5	5	4	4	0	18	9th
5	Tamara Dragičević	Michael Jackson	"Smooth Criminal" / "Dangerous" / "Thriller" / "Billie Jean" / "You Are Not Alone"	4	9	8	8	5	34	4th
6	Aleksa Jelić	Michael Jackson	"Smooth Criminal" / "Dangerous" / "Thriller" / "Billie Jean" / "You Are Not Alone"	3	8	7	7	0	25	6th
7	Knez	Saša Matić	"Kad ljubav zakasni"	12	7	5	6	0	30	5th
8	Boris Milivojević	Ana Kokić	"Idemo na sve"	7	12	10	10	15	54	2nd
9	Sneki	Silvana Armenulić	"Noćas mi srce pati"	6	6	6	5	0	23	7th
10	Željko Šašić	Milan Mladenović of EKV	"Ti si sav moj bol"	2	3	2	2	0	9	10th

Bonus points

- Goca gave five points to Boris
- Wikluh Sky gave five points to Goca
- Sara gave five points to Boris
- Ana gave five points to Boris
- Sneki gave five points to Sara
- Željko gave five points to Tamara
- Boris gave five points to Sara
- Knez gave five points to Goca
- Aleksa gave five points to Goca
- Tamara gave five points to Goca

=== Week 9 (December 7) ===
- Guest Judge: Nataša Bekvalac
- Winner: Knez

Order	Celebrity	Performing as	Song	Points (judges and contestants)					Total	Result
Order	Celebrity	Performing as	Song	Nataša	Ivan	Katarina	Marija	Bonus	Total	Result
1	Boris Milivojević	MC Hammer	"U Can't Touch This"	2	5	3	2	5	17	9th
2	Sneki	Karolina Gočeva	"Više se ne vraćaš"	3	2	2	5	0	12	10th
3	Ana Kokić	Fergie	"A Little Party Never Killed Nobody (All We Got)"	12	10	9	9	0	40	3rd
4	Sara Jovanović	Liza Minnelli	"Money"	5	6	7	7	0	25	6th
5	Tamara Dragičević	Joel Gray	"Money"	6	8	8	8	5	35	4th
6	Aleksa Jelić	Nataša Bekvalac	"Dobro moje" / "300 stepeni"	10	3	5	6	5	29	5th
7	Goca Tržan	Bono of U2	"One"	7	4	4	4	0	19	8th
8	Knez	Mary J. Blige	"One"	9	9	10	12	25	65	1st (Winner)
9	Željko Šašić	Snežana Babić Sneki	"Sneki rep (Moje vruće haljine)"	8	12	12	10	10	52	2nd
10	Wikluh Sky	Dino Dvornik	"Hipnotiziran"	4	7	6	3	0	20	7th

Bonus points

- Boris gave five point to Tamara
- Sneki gave five point to Željko
- Ana gave five point to Knez
- Tamara gave five point to Željko
- Sara gave five point to Knez
- Aleksa gave five point to Boris
- Goca gave five point to Knez
- Knez gave five point to Aleksa
- Željko gave five point to Knez
- Wikluh Sky gave five point to Knez

=== Week 10 (December 14) ===
- Guest Judge: Haris Džinović
- Winner: Sara Jovanović

Order	Celebrity	Performing as	Song	Points (judges and contestants)					Total	Result
Order	Celebrity	Performing as	Song	Haris	Ivan	Katarina	Marija	Bonus	Total	Result
1	Tamara Dragičević	Ruslana	"Wild Dances"	2	2	2	4	5	15	10th
2	Željko Šašić	Ceca	"K'o na grani jabuka"	6	4	4	3	5	22	8th
3	Wikluh Sky	Željko Šašić	"K'o na grani jabuka"	4	3	3	2	5	17	9th
4	Sneki	Cher	"If I Could Turn Back Time"	3	7	10	9	0	29	6th
5	Sara Jovanović	Katy Perry	"Unconditionally"	5	5	5	12	25	52	1st (Winner)
6	Knez	Zvonko Bogdan	"A ti se nećeš vratiti"	8	6	7	8	0	29	6th
7	Aleksa Jelić	Roy Scheider	"Bye Bye Life"	12	9	9	6	0	36	4th
8	Ana Kokić	Ben Vereen	"Bye Bye Life"	10	10	6	5	0	31	5th
9	Goca Tržan	Knez	"Dal' si ikad mene voljela"	9	8	8	10	5	40	3rd
10	Boris Milivojević	Željko Joksimović	"Ludak kao ja"	7	12	12	7	5	43	2nd

Bonus points

- Tamara gave five points to Sara
- Željko gave five points to Sara
- Wikluh Sky gave five points to Boris
- Sneki gave five points to Sara
- Knez gave five points to Sara
- Sara gave five points to Goca
- Aleksa gave five points to Željko
- Goca gave five points to Tamara
- Ana gave five points to Sara
- Boris gave five points to Wikluh Sky

=== Semi-final (December 21) ===
- Guest Judge: Dragoljub Mićko Ljubičić
- Winner: Aleksa Jelić

Order	Celebrity	Performing as	Song	Points (judges, contestants and public vote)						Total	Result
Order	Celebrity	Performing as	Song	Dragoljub	Ivan	Katarina	Marija	Bonus	Public vote	Total	Result
1	Ana Kokić	Beyoncé	"Ring the Alarm" / "Crazy in Love"	8	9	10	9	0	8	36	4th (Finalist)
2	Sneki	Ana Nikolić	"Romale, romali"	6	5	4	6	5	2	26	7th (Eliminated)
3	Aleksa Jelić	Robbie Williams	"Let Me Entertain You"	12	12	9	12	5	9	50	1st (Winner) (Finalist)
4	Željko Šašić	Željko Samardžić	"Ako odeš"	3	3	6	3	0	6	15	10th (Eliminated)
5	Knez	John Travolta	"You're the One That I Want"	4	2	2	2	10	4	20	8th (Finalist)
6	Goca Tržan	Olivia Newton-John	"You're the One That I Want"	5	8	7	7	5	3	32	6th (Eliminated)
7	Wikluh Sky	Amy Winehouse	"Back to Black" / "Rehab"	2	4	3	4	5	5	18	9th (Eliminated)
8	Sara Jovanović	Olivera Katarina	"Alaj mi je večeras po volji"	10	6	8	10	5	12	39	3rd (Finalist)
9	Tamara Dragičević	Vesna Đogani of Đogani	"Gljiva ludara"	9	7	5	8	5	7	34	5th (Eliminated)
10	Boris Milivojević	Seka Aleksić	"Crno i zlatno"	7	10	12	5	10	10	44	2nd (Finalist)

Bonus points

- Ana gave five points to Tamara
- Sneki gave five points to Boris
- Aleksa gave five points to Sara
- Željko gave five points to Wikluh Sky
- Goca gave five points to Knez
- Knez gave five points to Goca
- Wikluh Sky gave five points to Boris
- Sara gave five points to Aleksa
- Tamara gave five points to Knez
- Boris gave five points to Sneki

=== Final (December 28) ===
- Series winner: Ana Kokić

Order	Celebrity	Performing as	Song	Result
1	Aleksa Jelić	Madonna	"Vogue"	3rd
2	Boris Milivojević	Ko to tamo peva	"Za Beograd"	4th
3	Sara Jovanović	Leona Lewis	"Bleeding Love"	2nd
4	Ana Kokić	Pink	"Try"	Series winner
5	Knez	Lenny Kravitz	"Are You Gonna Go My Way"	5th
6	Goca Tržan	Cigani lete u nebo	"Andro Vera"	X
6	Katarina Radivojević	Cigani lete u nebo	"Andro Vera"	X
7	Tamara Dragičević	Kylie Minogue	"Can't Get You Out of My Head"	X
8	Željko Šašić	Alisa	"Posle devet godina"	X
8	Marija Mihaljević	Lepa Brena	"Posle devet godina"	X
9	Sneki	Alabina	"Yalla Bina Yalla"	X
9	Zile	Alabina	"Yalla Bina Yalla"	X
10	Wikluh Sky	Uroš Đurić	"Čekala sam"	X
10	Ivan Ivanović	Srđan Todorović	"Čekala sam"	X
11	Petar Strugar	Astor Piazzolla	"Libertango"	X
12	Gru	Madonna	"Hung Up" / "Gimme! Gimme! Gimme! (A Man After Midnight)" / "Voulez Vous" / "Mamma Mia"	X
12	Zile	ABBA	"Hung Up" / "Gimme! Gimme! Gimme! (A Man After Midnight)" / "Voulez Vous" / "Mamma Mia"	X

== Notes ==
1.Wikluh Sky and Sneki performed together.
2.Ana Kokić and Aleksa Jelić performed together.
3.Boris is singing Halid's song, but will perform as Ivica Dačić, Serbian prime minister, because Dačić sang that song in public once and it became a huge internet hit in Serbia. Halid was a special guest on the show.
4.Ana and Željko performed together.
5.Željko and Knez performed together.
6.Wikluh Sky and Sara performed together, featuring a guest appearance by Wikluh's colleague and famous rapper Ajs Nigrutin as American rapper 2 Chainz.
7.Tamara imitated Azra from cult Serbian movie "Dom za vešanje".
8.Wikluh Sky and Aleksa performed together.
9.Tamara and Aleksa have both imitated the same singer Michael Jackson together and they made tribute performance singing five songs.
10.Sara and Tamara performed together.
11.Goca and Knez performed together.
12.Željko and Wikluh Sky performed together.
13.Aleksa and Ana performed together.
14.Goca and Knez performed together.
15.Special episode included best performances from season one.
16.Goca and Katarina Radivojević (jury member) performed together in the final part of review program.
17.Wikluh Sky and Ivan Ivanović (jury member) performed together in the final part of review program.
18.Željko and Marija Mihajlović (jury member) performed together in the final part of review program
19.Sneki and Zile (choreographer) performed together in the final part of review program.
