= Ludi petak =

Ludi petak Crazy Friday

Studio album by Miligram
- Released: 23 December 2013
- Recorded: 2012–13: Studio Miligram, Belgrade, Serbia
- Genre: Rock
- Label: City Records; Miligram Music
- Producer: Aleksandar Milić; Ivan Milosavljević (co-producer)

Miligram chronology
The Best Of Miligram (2013)	Ludi petak Crazy Friday (2013)	Pop Mix (2014)

Ludi petak (Crazy Friday) is the third studio album by Serbian rock band Miligram. It was released 23 December 2013 through City Records.

== Music videos ==
The music video for "Vrati mi se nesrećo" premiered on 29 December 2013. "Apsolutna ljubav" and the title song both have music videos which premiered in April 2014.

== Tour ==
Miligram kicked off a concert tour promote their album on 12 April 2014 in Tuzla, Bosnia and Herzegovina.

== Track listing ==
No.	Title	Writer(s)	Length
1.	"Anđeo" (Angel)	Marina Tucaković; Aleksandar Tomić	4:05
2.	"Vrati mi se nesrećo" (Come Back to Me, My Unhappiness)	Marina Tucaković	3:21
3.	"Ljubav je passé" (Love is Passé)	Marina Tucaković; Milan Radulović	3:58
4.	"Ludi petak" (Crazy Friday)	Marina Tucaković; Aleksandar Tomić	3:41
5.	"Sve mi se menja" (Everything Is Changing for Me)	Marina Tucaković; Aleksandar Tomić	4:31
6.	"Ljubo preljubo" (Affair, Infidelity)	Marina Tucaković; Ljilja Jorgovanović	3:50
7.	"Apsolutna ljubav" (Absolute Love)	Marina Tucaković; Ljilja Jorgovanović	3:45
8.	"Mene ništa ne vadi" (Nothing Is Getting Me Out)	Marina Tucaković	3:20
9.	"Ima nešto u čoveku" (There Is Something In People)	Marina Tucaković	4:07
10.	"Reality"	Marina Tucaković; Milan Radulović	4:00
11.	"Voljen i iskorišćen" (Loved and Used)	Marina Tucaković; Ljilja Jorgovanović	4:24

== Personnel ==
=== Instruments ===
- Alen Ademović – music (5)
- Aleksandar Milić – music, backing vocals
- Ivana Selakov – backing vocals
- Vladimir Milenković – accordion
- Petar Trumbetaš – bouzouki
- Nenad Bojković – electric guitar
- Ivan Milosavljević – guitar
- Jovica Smrzlić – keyboards
- Strahinja Banović – trumpet

=== Production and recording ===
- Aleksandar Milić – arrangement, producing (2, 3, 10)
- Ivan Milosavljević – arrangement (10)
- James Cruz – mastering
- Ivan Milosavljević – programming, co-producing, sound design, mixing
