= Ana Kokić =

Serbian singer-songwriter

Ana Kokić Ана Кокић
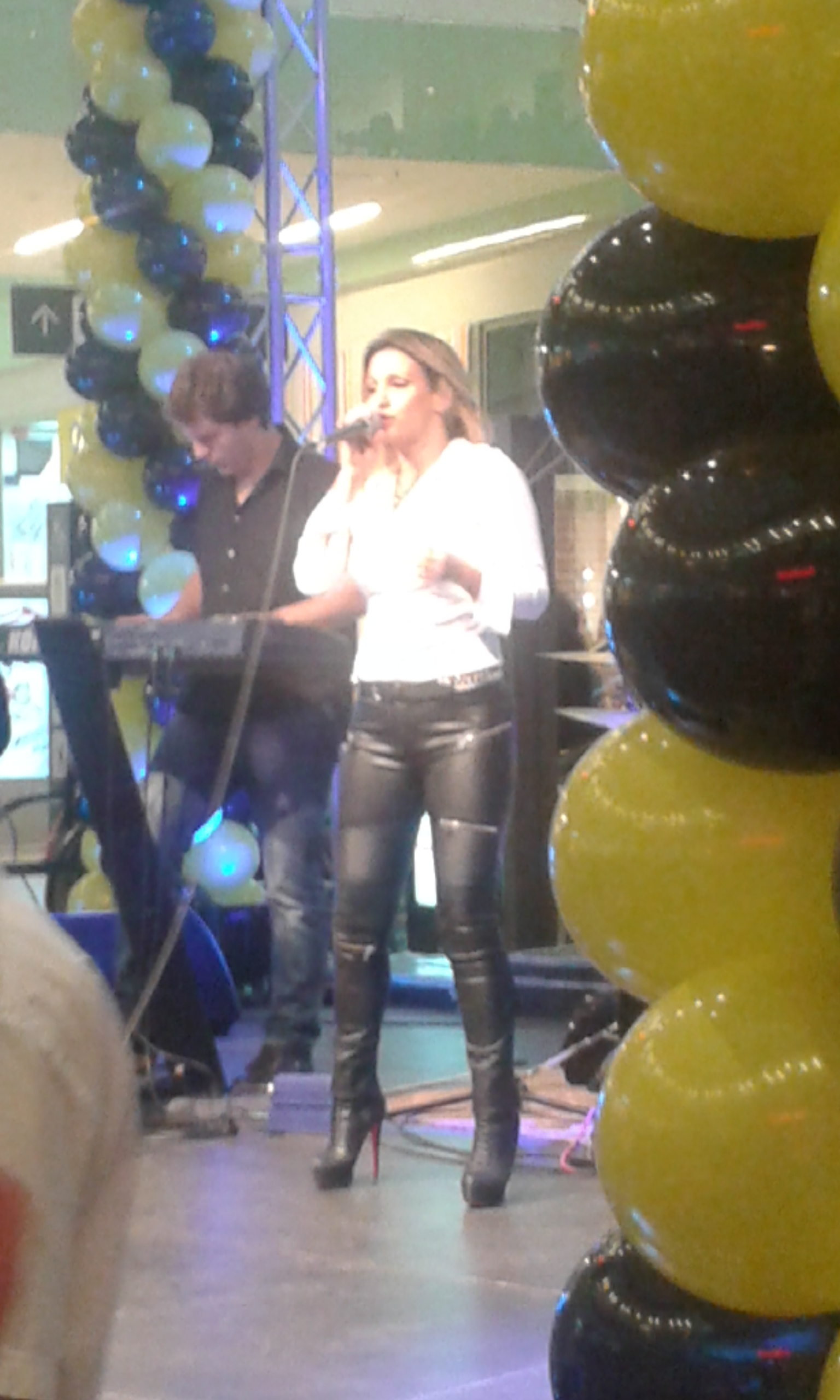
- Koki performing in Kragujevac, 2014

Background information
- Born: Ana Kokić; 11 March 1983 (age 43); Belgrade, SR Serbia, SFR Yugoslavia
- Genres: Pop; pop-folk; dance-pop
- Occupations: Singer, songwriter, television personality
- Instrument: Voice
- Labels: Grand Production; IDJTunes
- Formerly of: Energie
- Spouse: Nikola Rađen (m. 2008; div. 2019)

Ana Kokić (Serbian Cyrillic: Ана Кокић; born 11 March 1983), is a Serbian singer-songwriter and television personality.

== Career ==
Kokić began her singing career in the late '90s as a member of the dance-pop group Energie, with whom she released three albums. She eventually pursued a solo career with her debut album Mojna mala (lit. 'Baby Girl') released in 2006 under Grand Production. It spawned hit songs like the title track and "Čujem da" (lit. 'I Hear That'). Her second album Šta će meni ime... (lit. 'What Do I Need a Name For...?') was released in the following year, selling 200,000 copies. In 2011, she made a comeback to recording music after several years of hiatus with the release of her album Psiho (lit. 'Psycho') which featured a collaboration with the Romanian producer Costi Ioniță, titled "Idemo na sve" (lit. 'Let's Go All In'). It has sold 100,000 copies.

In December 2013, Kokić received wide attention for winning the first season of the Serbian television series Tvoje lice zvuči poznato. She also starred as singer Silvana Armenulić in the 2015 film We Will Be the World Champions and made her theatre debut in the comedy play Čekajući ministra in 2017.

== Personal life ==
Kokić graduated from the Milutin Milanković Geological and Hydrometeorological High School in Belgrade. Between 2008 and 2019, she was married to Serbian water polo player Nikola Rađen, with whom she has two daughters.

== Discography ==
Studio albums

- Mojne mala (2006)
- Šta će meni ime... (2007)
- Psiho (2011)

== Filmography ==
Filmography of Ana Kokić
Year	Title	Genre	Role	Notes
2013	Žene sa Dedinja	Television	Herself	Cameo appearance
2013	Tvoje lice zvuči poznato	Television	Herself	Season 1, Winner
2014	Tvoje lice zvuči poznato	Television	Herself	Season 2, Guest judge
2015	We Will Be the World Champions	Film	Silvana Armenulić	Cameo performance
2016	Nemoj da zvocaš	Television	Herself	Cameo appearance
2016	Tvoje lice zvuči poznato	Television	Herself	Season 3, Main judge
2019	Tvoje lice zvuči poznato	Television	Herself	Season 5: All-Stars, 3rd place
