= Dobrodošao u Klub Tour =

2013 concert tour by Severina

- Tour by Severina
- Promotional poster for concert in Belgrade at Kombank Arena, March 2013
- Associated album: Dobrodošao u Klub
- Start date: 23 March 2013
- End date: 6 December 2013
- Legs: 1
- No. of shows: Total 36

Severina concert chronology
- Zdravo Marijo Tour (2008–12); Dobrodošao u Klub Tour (2013); The Magic Tour (2019)

The Dobrodošao u Klub Tour (also styled as DUK Tour) was the second headlining concert tour by Croatian pop-folk singer Severina. It was launched to support of her eleventh studio album Dobrodošao u klub (2012). It was officially announced in February 2013, with dates for Balkan venues revealed. The tour began on 23 March 2013 in Rijeka, Croatia at Dvorana Mladosti, and concluded on 6 December of the same year in Split, Croatia at the Spaladium Arena.

The tour was also included some festival concerts. On 29 June 2013, Her tour was also a part of Celebration of Croatia's accession to the European Union. Severina also performed at the Strumica Open Festival, Macedonia on 18 July 2013.

== Set list ==
The concert set list consists of 29 songs. As part of the concert, a part of the song "Harlem Shake" was included.

1. "Italiana"
2. "Uzbuna"
3. "Lola"
4. "Harlem Shake"
5. "Tarapana"
6. "Mili moj"
7. "Gade"
8. "Daj da biram"
9. "Tango" (Maestro Dance Crew)
10. "Dobrodošao u klub"
11. "Kamen oko vrata"
12. "Ostavljena"
13. "Prijateljice"
14. "Kradeš sve"
15. "Ko me tjero"
16. "Tuge od sna"
17. "Grad bez ljudi"
18. "Molitva: Gardelin"
19. "Pogled ispod obrva"
20. "Tridesete"
21. "Šta me sad pitaš šta mi je"
22. "Virujen u te"
23. "Maestro Dance Crew/2Cellos"
24. "Krivi spoj"
25. "Ajde, ajde zlato moje"
26. "Gas, gas"
27. "Ja samo pjevam"
28. "Brad Pitt"

== Tour dates ==
Date	City	Country	Venue
Europe
23 March 2013	Rijeka	Croatia	Dvorana Mladosti
30 March 2013	Belgrade	Serbia	Kombank Arena
13 April 2013	Skopje	Macedonia	Boris Trajkovski Sports Center
20 April 2013	Hamburg	Germany	Edelfettwerk
1 May 2013	Novigrad	Croatia	Sportska dvorana Novigrad
11 May 2013	Zagreb	Croatia	Arena Zagreb
18 May 2013	Pforzheim	Germany	Flash Club
24 May 2013	Niš	Serbia	Čair Sports Center
25 May 2013	Kragujevac	Serbia	Jezero Hall
30 May 2013	Ljubljana	Slovenia	Arena Stožice
15 June 2013	Lukavac	Bosnia and Herzegovina	Arena Modrac
29 June 2013	Dubrovnik	Croatia	Stradun
14 July 2013	Mostar	Bosnia and Herzegovina	Daleka obala Club
15 July 2013	Travnik	Bosnia and Herzegovina	Tron Club
26 July 2013	Bale	Croatia	Lighthouse Club
27 July 2013	Portorož	Slovenia	Paprika Lounge
3 August 2013	Primošten	Croatia	Aurora Club
4 August 2013	Velika Polana	Slovenia	Pomurski poletni
7 August 2013	Rab	Croatia	Santos Club
9 August 2013	Makarska	Croatia	Petar Pan Club
11 August 2013	Budva	Montenegro	Top Hill
14 August 2013	Zadar	Croatia	Hitch Bar
18 August 2013	Strumica	Macedonia	Strumica Open Festival
23 August 2013	Vodice	Croatia	Hacienda
14 September 2013	Prevalje	Slovenia	Jesenska srečanja
20 September 2013	Bački Petrovac	Serbia	Aqua Park Petroland
28 September 2013	Dietlikon	Switzerland	Face Club
6 October 2013	Subotica	Serbia	Hala Sportova
12 October 2013	Sarajevo	Bosnia and Herzegovina	Zetra
18 October 2013	Novi Sad	Serbia	SPENS
8 November 2013	Varaždin	Croatia	Varaždin Arena
9 November 2013	Munich	Germany	VIP Club
16 November 2013	Berlin	Germany	Tempodrom
22 November 2013	Paris	France	Espace Venise
23 November 2013	Härkingen	Switzerland	Disco Atlantis
6 December 2013	Split	Croatia	Spaladium Arena

=== Box office score data ===
Venue	City	Tickets Sold
Dvorana Mladosti	Rijeka	5,550
Kombank Arena	Belgrade	20,000
Boris Trajkovski Arena	Skopje	15,000
Arena Zagreb	Zagreb	19,000
Arena Modrac	Lukavac	15,000
Čair Sports Center	Niš	5,000
Jezero Hall	Kragujevac	3,500
Arena Stožice	Ljubljana	11,000
Zetra	Sarajevo	15,000
SPENS	Novi Sad	7,000
Varaždin Arena	Varaždin	5,500
Tempodrom	Berlin	3,800
Spaladium Arena	Split	12,339
Dvorana Tabor	Maribor	4,500
TOTAL		150,000

== Live album ==
Dobrodošao u klub (Live)

Live album / Video by Severina
- Released: December 2014
- Language: Croatian; Serbian
- Label: Dallas; City

Severina chronology
Dobrodošao u klub (2012)	Dobrodošao u klub (Live) (2014)	Halo (2019)

Singles from Dobrodošao u klub (Live)
- 1. "Uno momento" Released: 22 July 2014; 2. "More tuge" Released: 7 October 2014

Dobrodošao u klub (Live) is the fourth live album and the third video album by Croatian singer Severina. It was released in December 2014 through Dallas Records in Croatia, and through City Records in Serbia. The double-disc album features the DVD of the tour on the first disc, and the live album on the second one. The album was preceded by two singles "Uno momento" and "More tuge", featuring Ministarke and Saša Matić, respectively. However, despite included in the Serbian edition in their studio version, they were completely omitted from the Croatian one.

=== Track listing ===
Dobrodošao u klub (Live) DVD (disc 1)
No.	Title	Length
1.	"Italiana"
2.	"Uzbuna"
3.	"Lola"
4.	"Harlem Shake"
5.	"Tarapana"
6.	"Mili moj"
7.	"Gade"
8.	"Daj da biram"
9.	"Tango"
10.	"Dobrodošao u klub"
11.	"Kamen oko vrata"
12.	"Ostavljena"
13.	"Prijateljice"
14.	"Tvoja prva djevojka"
15.	"Kradeš sve"
16.	"Ko me tjero"
17.	"Tuge od sna"
18.	"Grad bez ljudi"
19.	"Gardelin"
20.	"Pogled ispod obrva"
21.	"Tridesete"
22.	"Šta me sad pitaš što mi je?"
23.	"Virujen u te"
24.	"Maestro Dance Crew"
25.	"Djevojka sa sela"
26.	"Krivi spoj"
27.	"Ajde, ajde, zlato moje"
28.	"Moja štikla"
29.	"Gas, gas"
30.	"Ja samo pjevam"
31.	"Brad Pitt"
32.	"Italiana"

Dobrodošao u klub (Live) Serbian edition CD (disc 2)
No.	Title	Lyrics	Music	Arrangement	Length
1.	"Uno momento" (featuring Ministarke)	Miloš Roganović	Filip Miletić	Miletić; Roganović
2.	"More tuge" (featuring Saša Matić)	Miloš "Žuća" Smiljanić	Matić	Dejan Abadić
3.	"Italiana" (Live)
4.	"Uzbuna" (Live)
5.	"Tarapana" (Live)
6.	"Gade" (Live)
7.	"Daj da biram" (Live)
8.	"Dobrodošao u klub" (Live)
9.	"Kamen oko vrata" (Live)
10.	"Ostavljena" (Live)
11.	"Prijateljice" (Live)
12.	"Kradeš sve" (Live)
13.	"Ko me tjero" (Live)
14.	"Grad bez ljudi" (Live)
15.	"Pogled ispod obrva" (Live)
16.	"Tridesete" (Live)
17.	"Ajde, ajde, zlato moje" (Live)
18.	"Gas, gas" (Live)
19.	"Ja samo pjevam" (Live)
20.	"Brad Pitt" (Live)

Notes

- "Uno momento" and "More tuge" are omitted from the disc 2 of the Croatian edition.
