= Moja štikla / Moj sokole =

EP by Severina
- Released: 2006
- Genre: pop, folk
- Length: 17:46
- Label: Dallas (Croatia); Song Zelex (Bosnia & Herzegovina)

Severina chronology
Severgreen (2004)	Moja štikla / Moj sokole (2006)	Zdravo Marijo (2008)

Moja štikla / Moj sokole (English: My Stiletto / Oh, My Falcon) is an EP by Croatian singer Severina. It was released in 2006 by Dallas Records.

The song "Moja štikla" (lyrics written by Severina herself), was the Croatian entry at the Eurovision Song Contest 2006. It finished in 12th place and peaked at number six on the Croatian Top 20 Chart. The song was described in commentary as being in the turbo-folk style, with Severina singing about various chat-up attempts from local men, as well as entering into folk-influenced call-and-response lyrics with her backing singers.

== Track listing ==
All lyrics are written by Severina Vučković.

Digital edition
No.	Title	Music	Arrangement	Length
1.	"Moja štikla" (Eurosong 2006)	Boris Novković; Franjo Valentić	Goran Bregović	2:58
2.	"Moja štikla" (instrumental version)	Novković; Valentić	Bregović	2:57
3.	"Adam i Seva" (Silver Club Mix)	Vučković; Milo Stavros; Silvio Pasarić	Stavros; Pasarić	4:43
4.	"French Connection"	Vučković; Pasarić	Pasarić	4:07
5.	"Moj sokole"	Novković; Valentić	Novković	3:01
Total length:				17:46

CD edition
No.	Title	Director	Length
6.	"Moja štikla" (music video; featuring Let 3)	Radislav Jovanov Gonzo
7.	"Adam i Seva" (music video)	Ven Jemeršič

Notes

- "Moja štikla" contains vocal contributions from Ante Matić, Božo Marin, Dušan Marinović, Ivan Matić, Jure Radanović, Srećko Zebić and Stipe Žmire; who are all credited as featured artists on the CD edition.
- "Moj sokole" contains an interpolation of "Život sam promijenila" (2002), written by Franjo Valentić and Marina Tucaković, as performed by Neda Ukraden.
