= Croatia in the Eurovision Song Contest 2006 =

- Eurovision Song Contest 2006
- Participating broadcaster: Hrvatska radiotelevizija (HRT)
- Country: Croatia
- Selection process: Dora 2006
- Selection date: 4 March 2006

Competing entry
- Song: "Moja štikla"
- Artist: Severina
- Songwriters: Boris Novković; Franjo Valentić; Severina Vučković

Placement
- Final result: 12th, 56 points

Participation chronology

Croatia was represented at the Eurovision Song Contest 2006 with the song "Moja štikla", composed by Boris Novković and Franjo Valentić, with lyrics by Severina Vučković, and performed by Severina herself. The Croatian participating broadcaster, Hrvatska radiotelevizija (HRT), organised the national final Dora 2006 to select its entry for the contest. Thirty-two entries competed in the national final which consisted of three shows: two semi-finals and a final. Eight entries qualified from each semi-final on 2 and 3 March 2006 to compete in the final on 4 March 2006. In the final, "Moja štikla" performed by Severina was selected as the winner following the combination of votes from a five-member jury panel and a public televote. Songwriter Novković had represented Croatia in 2005 together with Lado members.

Croatia automatically qualified to compete in the final of the Eurovision Song Contest. Performing during the show in position 20, Croatia placed twelfth out of the 24 participating countries with 56 points.

== Background ==
Prior to the 2006 contest, Hrvatska radiotelevizija (HRT) had participated in the Eurovision Song Contest representing Croatia thirteen times since its first entry in 1993. Its best result in the contest was fourth, achieved on two occasions: in 1996 with the song "Sveta ljubav" performed by Maja Blagdan and in 1999 with the song "Marija Magdalena" performed by Doris Dragović. Following the introduction of semi-finals for the 2004, it had featured in every final they participated in thus far. In 2005, "Vukovi umiru sami" performed by Boris Novković featuring Lado Members managed to qualify to the final where they placed eleventh.

As part of its duties as participating broadcaster, HRT organises the selection of its entry in the Eurovision Song Contest and broadcasts the event in the country. The broadcaster confirmed its participation in the 2006 contest on 16 January 2006. Since 1993, HRT organised the national final Dora in order to select its entry for the contest, a method that was continued for its 2006 participation.

== Before Eurovision ==
=== Dora 2006 ===
Dora 2006 was the fourteenth edition of the national selection Dora organised by HRT to select its entry for the Eurovision Song Contest 2006. The competition consisted of two semi-finals on 2 and 3 March 2006 and a final on 4 March 2006, all taking place at the Hotel Kvarner in Opatija and broadcast on HTV1.

==== Format ====
Thirty-two songs competed in Dora 2006 which consisted of three shows: two semi-finals and a final. Sixteen songs competed in each semi-final with the top eight proceeding to complete the sixteen-song lineup in the final. The results of all shows were determined by public televoting and the votes from a jury panel. The ranking developed by both streams of voting was converted to points from 1 (lowest) to 16 (highest) and assigned to the competing songs. Ties were decided in favour of the entry that received the most points from the jury.

The jury that voted in all three shows consisted of:

- Silvije Glojnarić – HRT
- Robert Urlić – HR
- Željen Klašterka – HTV
- Ljiljana Vinković – HTV
- Aleksandar Kostadinov – HTV

==== Competing entries ====
HRT announced the thirty-two competing entries on 10 February 2006 and among the artists were Magazin which represented Croatia in 1995, Danijela Martinović who represented Croatia in 1995 as part of Magazin and in 1998, and Claudia Beni who represented Croatia in 2003. The artists and songs for the competition were selected by a five-member expert committee consisting of Silvije Glojnarić (HRT), Robert Urlić (HR), Željen Klašterka (HTV), Ljiljana Vinković (HTV) and Aleksandar Kostadinov (HTV) after artists and composers were directly invited by HRT to submit their entries.

Artist	Song	Songwriter(s)
Alen Vitasović	"Škifo"	Duško Rapotec Ute, Robert Pilepić
Andrea Čubrić	"Onako kako volim"	Sandra Sagena
Angels	"Party djevojka"	Marko Tomasović, Mario Simunović
Claudia Beni	"Samo ti mi ostani"	Ivan Brdar, Mario Šimunović
Đani Stipaničev	"Tilo uz tilo"	Toni Eterović, Marina Anđelković
Danijela Martinović	"Oči od safira"	Đorđe Novković
Emina Arapović	"Čuvari ljubavi"	Ana Stanić, Olja Savičev, Branimir Mihaljević
En Face	"Čuvaj nas"	Sandro Bastijančić, Miro Vidović
Ibrica Jusić	"Nježne riječi"	Marko Tomasović, Ibrica Jusić
Ivana Banfić	"Kad se sklope kazaljke"	Dalibor Paurić, Fayo
Jacques Houdek	"Umrijeti s osmjehom"	Ante Pecotić
Jelena Rozga	"Ne zovi me Marija"	Tonči Huljić, Vjekoslava Huljić
Karma	"Pusti da te vodi ritam"	Josip Miani, Darus
Kraljevi ulice	"Kao san"	Miran Hadži Veljković
Kristina	"Zapisano na dlanu"	Daniel Galar, Ivan Brozović, Robert Poljak
Lana Jurčević	"Najbolja glumica"	Milana Vlaović
Latino	"Kunem se"	Željko Krušlin, Duško Gruborović
Magazin	"Oprosti, mala"	Tonči Huljić, Vjekoslava Huljić
Magnetic	"Ne mogu lagati"	Daniel Hojsak, Marina Ergotić
Maja Šuput	"Kad sklopim oči"	Denis Dumančić, Fayo
Marija Husar	"Budi njen"	Miro Buljan, Sandra Sagena
Massimo	"Tu na mojim rukama"	Denis Dumančić, Fayo
Minea	"Sve dok ne postanem prah"	Miro Buljan, Nenad Ninčević
Petar Grašo	"Prokleto sam"	Tonči Huljić, Petar Grašo
Raspashow	"U tebi tražim spas"	Ivan Skunca
Rivers	"To je sve za večeras"	Olja Desić, Irena Ćepulić
Sandi Cenov and Mirela Bunoza	"To nisam više ja"	Ante Pecotić
Severina	"Moja štikla"	Boris Novković, Franjo Valentić, Severina Vučković
Tina and Nikša	"Kazna"	Nikša Jurinović
Tina Vukov	"Il treno per Genova"	Robert Funčić
Vlatka Pokos	"Najbolje"	Ante Pecotić
Žanamari	"Ljubav za jednu noć"	Zorana Šiljeg

==== Semi-finals ====
The two semi-finals took place on 2 and 3 March 2006. The first semi-final was hosted by Duško Ćurlić, Mirko Fodor, and Emilija Kokić (who won Eurovision for Yugoslavia in 1989 as part of Riva) in the first semi-final, while the second semi-final was hosted by Duško Ćurlić, Mirko Fodor, and Vesna Pisarović (who represented Croatia in 2002). The eight qualifiers for the final from each semi-final were determined by a 50/50 combination of votes from a five-member jury panel and a public televote.

In addition to the performances of the competing entries, former Croatian Eurovision entrants performed as the interval acts during the semi-finals. Riva, Dubrovački trubaduri (who represented Yugoslavia in 1968), E.N.I. (1997), Goran Karan (2000), Claudia Beni (2003) and Boris Novković (2005) performed in the first semi-final, while Vesna Pisarović, Krunoslav Slabinac (who represented Yugoslavia in 1971), Put (1993), Magazin (1995), Danijela Martinović (1995 and 1998), Vanna (2001) and Ivan Mikulić (2004) performed in the second semi-final.

Semi-final 1 – 2 March 2006
R/O	Artist	Song	Jury	Televote	Total	Place
1	Maja Šuput	"Kad sklopim oči"	4	5	9	12
2	Magnetic	"Ne mogu lagati"	1	7	8	13
3	Minea	"Sve dok ne postanem prah"	6	1	7	14
4	Tina Vukov	"Il treno per Genova"	15	12	27	1
5	En Face	"Čuvaj nas"	5	8	13	11
6	Andrea Čubrić	"Onako kako volim"	3	2	5	15
7	Sandi Cenov and Mirela Bunoza	"To nisam više ja"	2	3	5	16
8	Emina Arapović	"Čuvari ljubavi"	9	4	13	10
9	Angels	"Party djevojka"	7	13	20	8
10	Marija Husar	"Budi njen"	11	6	17	9
11	Lana Jurčević	"Najbolja glumica"	10	16	26	3
12	Massimo	"Tu na mojim rukama"	16	9	25	4
13	Ivana Banfić	"Kad se sklope kazaljke"	12	10	22	7
14	Petar Grašo	"Prokleto sam"	14	11	25	5
15	Magazin	"Oprosti, mala"	13	14	27	2
16	Danijela Martinović	"Oči od safira"	8	15	23	6

Semi-final 2 – 3 March 2006
R/O	Artist	Song	Jury	Televote	Total	Place
1	Claudia Beni	"Samo ti mi ostani"	5	2	7	14
2	Đani Stipaničev	"Tilo uz tilo"	9	5	14	10
3	Raspashow	"U tebi tražim spas"	7	9	16	8
4	Rivers	"To je sve za večeras"	2	1	3	16
5	Tina and Nikša	"Kazna"	1	12	13	12
6	Jacques Houdek	"Umrijeti s osmjehom"	12	7	19	6
7	Alen Vitasović	"Škifo"	10	8	18	7
8	Vlatka Pokos	"Najbolje"	8	4	12	13
9	Kraljevi ulice	"Kao san"	15	15	30	1
10	Žanamari	"Ljubav za jednu noć"	6	10	16	9
11	Kristina	"Zapisano na dlanu"	3	11	14	11
12	Latino	"Kunem se"	4	3	7	15
13	Karma	"Pusti da te vodi ritam"	11	14	25	4
14	Jelena Rozga	"Ne zovi me Marija"	13	13	26	3
15	Ibrica Jusić	"Nježne riječi"	16	6	22	5
16	Severina	"Moja štikla"	14	16	30	2

==== Final ====
The final took place on 4 March 2006, hosted by Duško Ćurlić, Mirko Fodor, Emilija Kokić (who won Eurovision for Yugoslavia in 1989 as part of Riva) and Vesna Pisarović (who represented Croatia in 2002). The winner, "Moja štikla" performed by Severina, was determined by a 50/50 combination of votes from a five-member jury panel and a public televote. In addition to the performances of the competing entries, Lady Swing performed as the interval act during the show.

Final – 4 March 2006
R/O	Artist	Song	Jury	Televote	Total	Place
1	Angels	"Party djevojka"	5	9	14	10
2	Jacques Houdek	"Umrijeti s osmjehom"	6	3	9	15
3	Magazin	"Oprosti, mala"	8	8	16	8
4	Alen Vitasović	"Škifo"	3	1	4	16
5	Raspashow	"U tebi tražim spas"	7	4	11	13
6	Danijela Martinović	"Oči od safira"	4	6	10	14
7	Ibrica Jusić	"Nježne riječi"	11	2	13	11
8	Karma	"Pusti da te vodi ritam"	1	12	13	12
9	Tina Vukov	"Il treno per Genova"	14	13	27	3
10	Petar Grašo	"Prokleto sam"	13	5	18	7
11	Lana Jurčević	"Najbolja glumica"	2	14	16	9
12	Severina	"Moja štikla"	15	15	30	1
13	Jelena Rozga	"Ne zovi me Marija"	9	10	19	6
14	Massimo	"Tu na mojim rukama"	16	7	23	4
15	Ivana Banfić	"Kad se sklope kazaljke"	10	11	21	5
16	Kraljevi ulice	"Kao san"	12	16	28	2

== At Eurovision ==
According to Eurovision rules, all nations with the exceptions of the host country, the "Big Four" (France, Germany, Spain and the United Kingdom) and the ten highest placed finishers in the 2005 contest are required to qualify from the semi-final in order to compete for the final; the top ten countries from the semi-final progress to the final. Following Serbia and Montenegro's withdrawal from the contest on 15 March and subsequent removal from the final, Croatia which placed eleventh in the 2005 contest took its place and automatically qualified to compete in the final on 20 May 2006. On 21 March 2006, a special allocation draw was held which determined the running order and Croatia was set to perform in position 20, following the entry from France and before the entry from Ireland. Croatia placed twelfth in the final, scoring 56 points.

Both the semi-final and the final were broadcast in Croatia on HRT with commentary by Duško Ćurlić. HRT appointed Mila Horvat as its spokesperson to announce the Croatian votes during the final.

=== Voting ===
Below is a breakdown of points awarded to Croatia and awarded by Croatia in the semi-final and grand final of the contest. The nation awarded its 12 points to Bosnia and Herzegovina in the semi-final and the final of the contest.

==== Points awarded to Croatia ====
Points awarded to Croatia (Final)
Score	Country
12 points	Bosnia and Herzegovina
10 points	Macedonia; Serbia and Montenegro; Slovenia
8 points	
7 points	
6 points	Switzerland
5 points	
4 points	Monaco
3 points	
2 points	Germany; Turkey
1 point	

==== Points awarded by Croatia ====
Points awarded by Croatia (Semi-final)
Score	Country
12 points	Bosnia and Herzegovina
10 points	Finland
8 points	Macedonia
7 points	Albania
6 points	Slovenia
5 points	Lithuania
4 points	Sweden
3 points	Russia
2 points	Ukraine
1 point	Iceland

Points awarded by Croatia (Final)
Score	Country
12 points	Bosnia and Herzegovina
10 points	Finland
8 points	Macedonia
7 points	Russia
6 points	Lithuania
5 points	Romania
4 points	Ukraine
3 points	Sweden
2 points	Ireland
1 point	United Kingdom
