= Zdravo Marijo =

Studio album by Severina
- Released: 19 May 2008
- Recorded: December 2006 – January 2008
- Genre: Balkan folk; turbo-folk; pop; adult contemporary
- Length: 37:44
- Language: Croatian
- Label: Dallas Records; PGP-RTS; Hayat Production
- Producer: Goran Bregović

Severina chronology
Moja štikla / Moj sokole (2006)	Zdravo Marijo (2008)	Tvoja prva djevojka (2009)

Severina studio album chronology
Severgreen (2004)	Zdravo Marijo (2008)	Dobrodošao u klub (2012)

Zdravo Marijo (Croatian for 'Hail Mary') is the tenth studio album by Croatian singer Severina. It was released in 2008. Due to success in Serbia, Severina performed at the Belgrade Arena in front of 17,000 people. The album has caused media interest and a degree of controversy because of its folk-like sound some compared to turbo-folk.

== Track listing ==
All lyrics are written by Marina Tucaković, Ljiljana Jorgovanović and Goran Bregović, except where noted; all music is composed by Bregović, except where noted; all arrangements and production were handled by Bregović.

Zdravo Marijo track listing
No.	Title	Lyrics	Music	Length
1.	"Gas, gas"			3:37
2.	"Pucajte u tamburaše"		Traditional; Bregović	4:29
3.	"Muškarcu samo treba kurva"			4:06
4.	"Gade"			3:41
5.	"Da nisi možda gej?"			3:12
6.	"Ljute cigare"			3:52
7.	"Haljinica boje lila"	Nikola Pejaković	Pejaković	3:23
8.	"Šta to ona ima, što ja nemam?"			3:59
9.	"Tridesete"		Sezen Axu	4:02
10.	"Zdravo Marijo"			3:23
Total length:				37:44

Notes

- "Gas, gas" features Lovran Brass Orchestra conducted by Miodrag Kašić.
- "Pucajte u tamburaše" features Zlatni Dukati on background vocals and tamburica.
- "Da nisi možda gej?" features Gradska Glazba Zvonimir conducted by Tonći Ćićerić.
- "Ljute cigare" features Česká Beseda Brass Orchestra conducted by Milivoj Častek.
- "Zdravo Marijo" features Željezničar Brass Orchestra and Trenkovi Panduri conducted by Krunoslav Seletković.

Sample credits

- "Haljinica boje lila" is a Croatian-language cover of "Haljinica boje lila" (1997), penned by Željko Joksimović and composed by Nikola Pejaković, as performed by Milka "Lola" Relić and Pejaković himself.
- "Tridesete" is a Croatian-language cover of "Kaçın Kurası" (1995), written by Sezen Aksu, as performed by Sibel Tüzün.
- "Zdravo Marijo" contains an interpolation of the Toccata and Fugue in D minor, BWV 565, by Johann Sebastian Bach; its lyrics interpolate the Catholic prayers Hail Mary and Lord's Prayer.

== Tridesete Tour ==
The album was accompanied by a concert tour. The tour started on 29 August 2008 in Karlovac, Croatia, and ended on 20 October 2012 in Frankfurt, Germany.

Date	City	Country	Venue
Leg 1 — Europe
29 August 2008	Karlovac	Croatia	Dani piva
12 September 2008	Mostar	Bosnia and Herzegovina	Bridge Club
17 October 2008	Zaprešić	Croatia	Town square
18 October 2008	Slovenj Gradec	Slovenia	Octoberfest
21 December 2008	Zagreb	Croatia	Dom Sportova
31 December 2008	Pula	Croatia	City square
15 May 2009	Split	Croatia	City square
23 May 2009	Ljubljana	Slovenia	Spomladanski Festival
29 June 2009	Opatija	Croatia	Ljetna pozornica
11 July 2009	Primošten	Croatia	Aurora Club
8 August 2009	Dubrovnik	Croatia	Vala Club
13 August 2009	Vodice	Croatia	Hacienda
1 September 2009	Karlovac	Croatia	Dani piva
12 September 2009	Kragujevac	Serbia	Knežev dvor
18 September 2009	Munich	Germany	Shakespeare Club
20 September 2009	Zagreb	Croatia	Rujanfest
17 October 2009	Belgrade	Serbia	Kombank Arena
26 December 2009	Ljubljana	Slovenia	Prešeren Square
29 April 2010	Zagreb	Croatia	Vatroslav Lisinski Concert Hall
1 May 2010	Split	Croatia	Beerfest
2 May 2010	Kotor	Montenegro	Maximus Club
21 May 2010	Ljubljana	Slovenia	Križanke
2 July 2010	Malinska	Croatia	Crossroad Club
25 July 2010	Budva	Montenegro	Top Hill
30 July 2010	Herceg Novi	Montenegro	Peoples Beach Bar
6 August 2010	Velika Polana	Slovenia	Pomurski poletni festival
14 August 2010	Rab	Croatia	Gradski stadion
28 August 2010	Blace	Serbia	Town square
29 August 2010	Banja Luka	Bosnia and Herzegovina	Aqua park "Aquana"
3 September 2010	Split	Croatia	Vanilla Club
10 September 2010	Šempeter pri Gorici	Slovenia	Gas poletje
30 September 2010	Belgrade	Serbia	Magacin Club
1 October 2010	Vienna	Austria	Disco Nachtwerk
2 October 2010	Podčetrtek	Slovenia	Športska dvorana
8 October 2010	Niš	Serbia	Spark Club
16 October 2010	Zurich	Switzerland	Jil Club
6 November 2010	Skopje	Macedonia	Boris Trajkovski Arena
19 November 2010	Užice	Serbia	Hala sportova
27 November 2010	Grosuplje	Slovenia	Kongo Casino
3 December 2010	Zagreb	Croatia	Club Shamballa
28 December 2010	Paraćin	Serbia	Bazeni Prestige
31 December 2010	Budva	Montenegro	Hotel Splendid
12 Februar 2011	Osijek	Croatia	Gradski vrt Hall
11 March 2011	Tuzla	Bosnia and Herzegovina	Dvorana Mejdan
6 May 2011	Kragujevac	Serbia	City square
20 May 2011	Celje	Slovenia	Disco Planet Tuš
11 June 2011	Osijek	Croatia	Avenue Mall Osijek
16 July 2011	Primošten	Croatia	Aurora Club
30 July 2011	Zadar	Croatia	Ponton Festival
3 August 2011	Kotor	Montenegro	Maximus Club
4 August 2011	Vodice	Croatia	Hacienda
11 August 2011	Mostar	Bosnia and Herzegovina	Daleka obala – Gradski bazen
13 August 2011	Dubrovnik	Croatia	Gospino polje
20 August 2011	Poreč	Croatia	Gradska Riva
27 August 2011	Cerklje ob Krki	Slovenia	Festival Panonika harmonika
28 August 2011	Novi Bečej	Serbia	Velikogospojinski dani
3 September 2011	Cetinje	Montenegro	City square
9 September 2011	Vinkovci	Croatia	City square
27 July 2012	Bale	Croatia	Lighthouse Music Club
3 August 2012	Primošten	Croatia	Aurora Club
5 August 2012	Budva	Montenegro	Top Hill
10 August 2012	Bol	Croatia	Zlatni Rat
16 August 2012	Zadar	Croatia	Hitch Bar
18 August 2012	Vodice	Croatia	Hacienda
14 September 2012	Vršac	Serbia	Grožđebal
23 September 2012	Koper	Slovenia	Town square
5 October 2012	Bihać	Bosnia and Herzegovina	City square
20 October 2012	Frankfurt	Germany	Union Halle
