= Magic Tour =

Magic Tour may refer to a concert tour by:

- Magic Tour (Bruce Springsteen)
- Magic Tour (Queen)
- The Magic Tour (Severina)
