= Severina (singer) =

Croatian singer (born 1972)

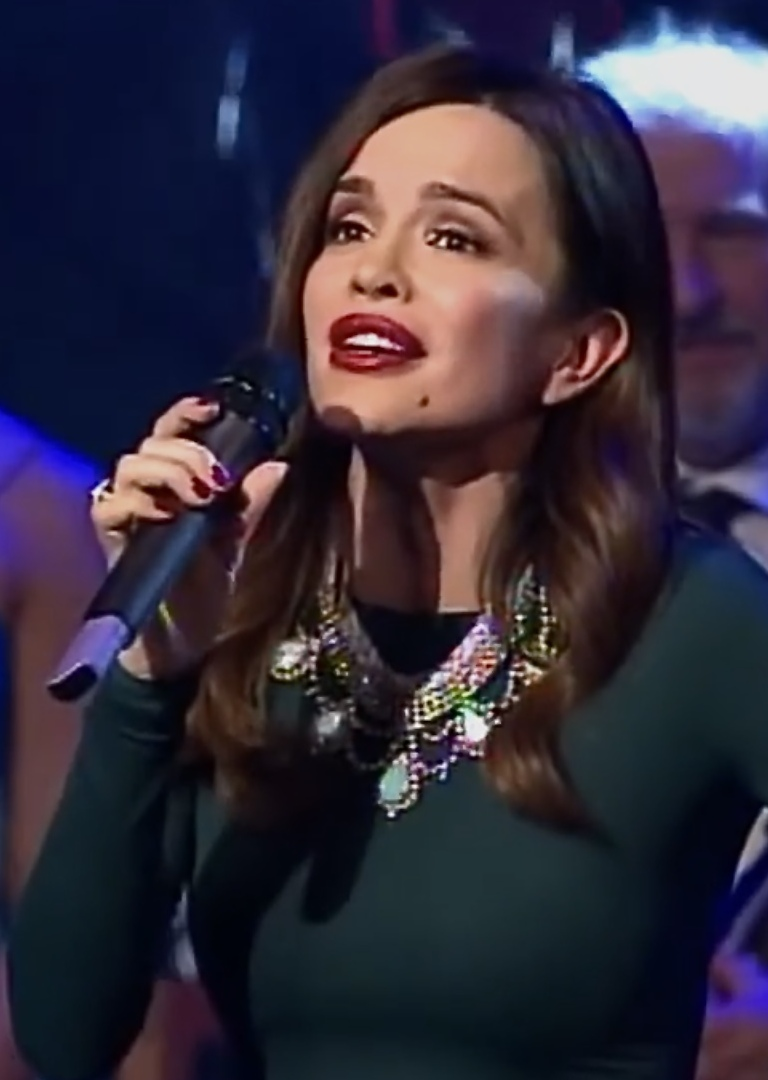
- Severina performing in 2014
- Born: Severina Vučković; 21 April 1972 (age 54); Split, SR Croatia, SFR Yugoslavia
- Other names: Seve; Seve Nacionale
- Occupations: Singer; songwriter; actress
- Years active: 1989–present
- Height: 1.71 m (5 ft 7 in)
- Spouse: Igor Kojić (m. 2015; div. 2021)
- Partner: Milan Popović (2010–2012)
- Children: 1
- Relatives: Aljoša Vučković (uncle)
- Musical career
- Genres: Pop; pop-folk; rock; electropop; disco; cabaret; jazz; ethno
- Instrument: Vocals
- Labels: Croatia; Dallas; City; IDJTunes; FM Play
- Website: severina.com

Severina Vučković (born 21 April 1972), better known mononymously as Severina, is a Croatian singer-songwriter and actress. She is widely regarded as one of the most prominent, popular and influential artists in the Balkan region and former Yugoslavia. Born in Split, she rose to fame in the late 1980s with a series of commercially successful songs that established her as a leading figure in Croatian pop music. Known for her distinctive blend of pop, folk, jazz and dance elements, as well as her expressive vocal style, music videos and dynamic stage presence, Severina quickly built a large and devoted fan base across Southeast Europe. She further expanded her international recognition when she represented Croatia at the Eurovision Song Contest 2006, held in Athens, Greece, with the song "Moja štikla", finishing 12th.

Severina is considered one of the most popular figures in Croatia and its popular culture, having collaborated with numerous artists including Jala Brat, Ministarke, Azis, Marina Tucaković, Saša Matić, Miligram, Petar Grašo, Kemal Monteno, Željko Bebek, Crvena Jabuka, Goran Bregović, Boris Novković, Lana Jurčević, Danijela Martinović and many others. Many of her songs were written by her including: "Ostavljena", "Da si moj", "Ja samo pjevam", "Ajde ajde zlato moje", "Mili Moj", "Pogled ispod obrva", "Djevojka sa sela", "Ante", "Ko me tjero", "Adam i Seva", "Parfem" and others.

Over the course of her career, Severina has released 12 studio albums and hit singles, many of which have topped regional charts and become enduring staples of Balkan popular music. In addition to her music career, she has appeared in films, television productions, and theater, further solidifying her status as a multifaceted entertainer. In 2006, the Croatian weekly Nacional listed her among the 100 most influential Croats, calling her "the only bona fide Croatian celebrity", as well as "Queen of Croatian music". She won the award "Zlatna ptica" for the best-selling artist of the decade in Croatia. In 2015, she was the most searched person on Google in Croatia and Slovenia. She is the only person in Croatia to accumulate more than one billion views on her YouTube channel.

== Early life ==
Severina was born in Split, SR Croatia, SFR Yugoslavia on 21 April 1972, the youngest daughter of Ana (who was from Drniš) and Sever Vučković. Aljoša Vučković is her uncle. She also has two older sisters, Zdenka and Marijana. Severina has had a love for music and stage performance from an early age. When asked how did she got her name "Severina", she responded by saying: "My father wanted me to be Nataša, but my mom adored my father whose name was Sever, and my grandfather was giving his children names by Cardinal directions" (Serbo-Croatian: Sever - North)

From a young age, she was interested in music, dance, acting and the piano. She started singing as a girl in KUD Mozaik, which was led by Lepa Smoje, wife of Miljenko Smoje, who immediately recognized Severina as a future star. Lepa Smoje assigned her the role of Carmela in the musical "Frane Štrapalo". Lepa Smoje once said: "The moment I saw her on the stage of the Frano Štrapalo musical, I said: this little girl is a born star" Later, she started singing in the Treća smena group and won first prizes at competitions, one of which was from the Student summer, where she was declared the best singer. After finishing elementary school, Severina enrolled in the Josip Hatze High School of Music in Split, but she stopped her education in order to devote herself to a musical career.

== Career ==
=== 1982–1993: Beginnings ===
Severina's career was launched in the late 1980s when she began performing in local festivals and competitions. In 1982, in Split, at the Dječji prvi pljesak (Children's First Applause) competition, Severina won with the song Moja Milena. In 1987, at the Croatian amateur singer competition in Daruvar, Severina won with Josipa Lisac's song O jednoj mladosti ('About one youth'). One of her first major performances came in 1989, when she was 17 in her hometown of Split. In Hotel Marjan, she performed "Tata čuješ li muziku" ("Dad can you hear the music"). She performed at various festivals, and in 1990 she moved to Zagreb where she won the radio competition "Demo X" at Radio Zagreb, which won her an opportunity to record her first album. Severina started playing music professionally in 1990. In July 1991, she performed "Vodi me na ples" ("Take me to dance") at Split Festival. She released her first self-titled album called "Severina" in 1990. After meeting Zrinko Tutić in 1992, Severina recorded her second self-titled album "Severina", released by Croatia Records. The album contained songs like "Vodi me na ples" ("Take me to dance") and "Kad si sam" ("When you’re alone"), "Idemo se ljubiti" ("Let's kiss"), which quickly won the hearts of the audience and became hits. During the collaboration with Tutić, she also recorded the albums "Dalmatinka", "Trava zelena", "Moja stvar" and "Djevojka sa sela". She signed a six-year contract with the production company Tutico and Zrinko Tutić, who introduced her to Croatian singer and songwriter Gibonni. At the singer's urging, Zrinko gave Gibonni the chance to record the song "Zlatne godine" (Golden Years), which he had written. In addition to the two of them, she also collaborated with Dino Dvornik.

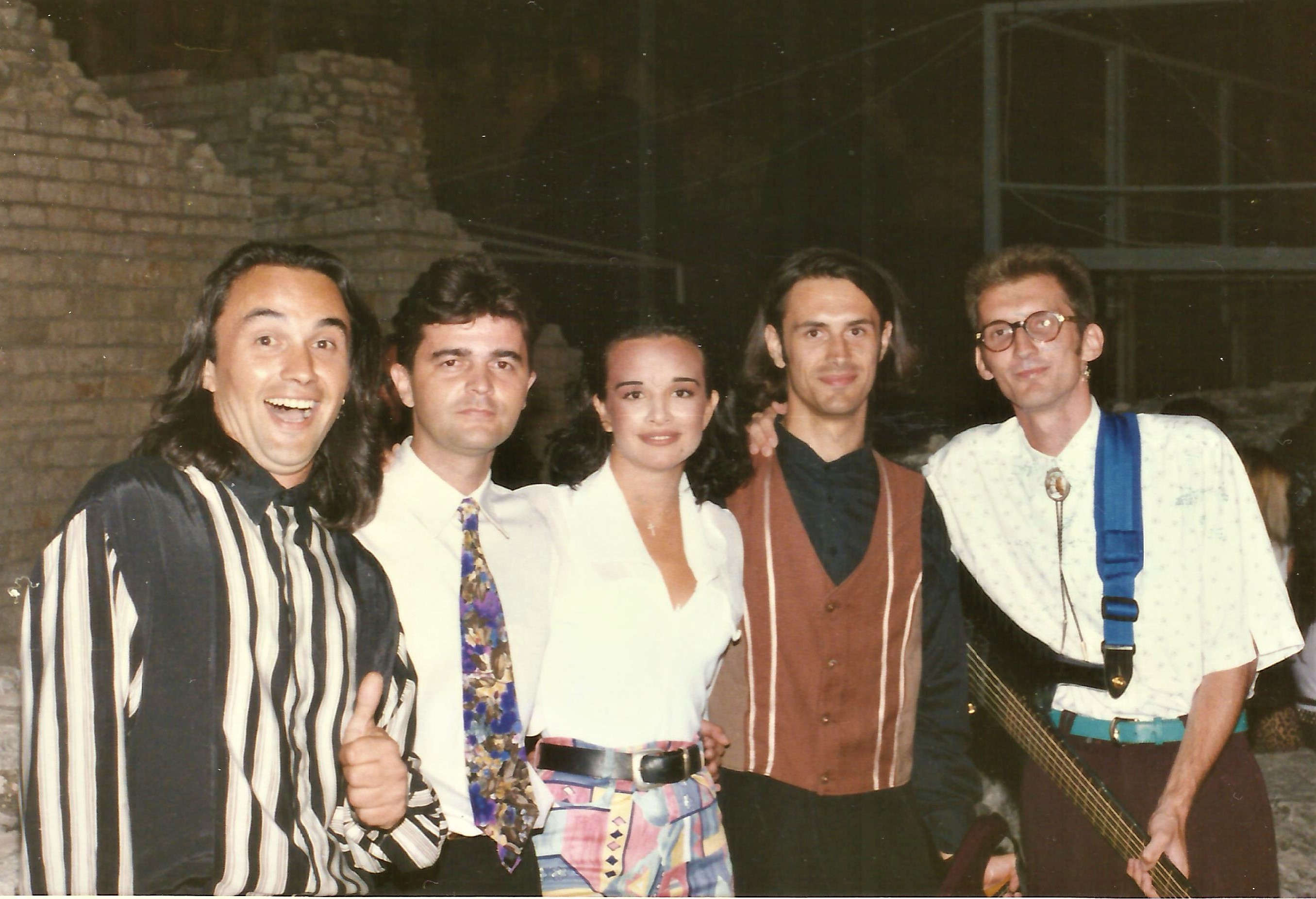
Severina (in the middle) with Band Škorpioni, in Pula Arena in 1993

That same year she won the first prize at the Zagreb Festival with the song "Sklopi oči muzika dok svira" (Close Your Eyes While the Music Is Playing). She soon became the host of the show Top Cup on Croatian Radiotelevision (HRT), which she hosted for a year, and at the end of the year she went on her first tour in Australia.

In 1993, Severina with her previous producer Zrinko Tutić recorded the album "Dalmatinka" (Dalmatian girl) for the same record company, which brought her great popularity. The title song can be considered one of Severina's signature songs. The leading song from her third studio album, Dalmatinka (Dalmatian Woman), became a sensation and captured the emotions of many at the time of release. In the song, Severina sang about her love for her native Dalmatia, the color of white and Virgin Mary. The album had a total of 10 songs among which were "Ne bi' ti oprostila" (I Wouldn't Forgive You), "Ne spavaj mala moja" (Don't Sleep, My Baby Girl; Bijelo Dugme cover), "Paloma nera" (Black Dove), "Ljubi me noćas" (Kiss me tonight) and others. Both "Paloma nera" and the title track became number one hits on the national top list, and a very successful tour of Croatia and Slovenia followed.

=== 1993–1998: Further success ===
In 1995, the album "Trava zelena" (Green Grass) was released. Although it did not have as many hits as the previous ones, it was commercially successful. It contains ten tracks: "Trava zelena" (Green grass), "Vatra i led" (Fire and ice), "Mr. Taliman", "Bože moj" (My God), "Bambola", "Lude godine" (Crazy Years), "Poželi me" (Wish for me), "Pruži mi ruku" (Give me your hand), "Ludo moja" (Crazy mine), "Ti si srce moje" (You are my heart) a duet with Žera from Crvena Jabuka. Other collaborators on the album were Faruk Buljubasic, Nenad Ninčević, Rajko Dujmić, and for the first time Severina herself is credited as a writer on three songs. The title track was the most popular song of the year and Severina's primacy on the Croatian media platform rose as a result. It was another collaboration with Tutić.

Her fifth studio album was Moja stvar (My Thing), released on 5 November 1996. The album was influenced by rock sounds. The title track was written and composed by Severina herself. To promote the album, Severina held a sold-out concert on 14 November 1996 in Dom Sportova venue in Zagreb. She opened the concert with the song "Moja stvar" (My thing). In Zrcalo interview on HRT, when asked why the album was not dance influenced, she responded by saying: "Why should we separate music on only dance and pop? ".

Her biggest breakthrough at the time was in 1998 when she released the album Djevojka sa sela (Girl from a village), which was composed and written partly by Tutić and partly by Severina. Severina wrote six songs. The title track is one of her biggest hits and was used by the Croatia national football team as their unofficial anthem during their campaign at the 1998 FIFA World Cup. Djevojka sa sela was her last album composed by Tutić and his production company Tutico. They parted ways following its release due to a contract dispute.

=== 1999–2003: Continued success ===
In early 1999, Severina went on a second tour of Australia, and in July of the same year she performed at the Melodies of Croatian Jadran (MHJ) festival with Đorđe Novković's song 'Da si moj'. She also released a new album Ja samo pjevam, which returned her to the top of all charts and from which the song 'Ante' stood out. Severina cut off her long hair and started wearing more provocative tops. Severina's seventh studio album, Ja samo pjevam (I'm just singing), was a continuation of the pop sounds heard on her previous albums. It was released in 1999 by Croatia Records, It had a total of 10 songs. The composer of this album was Đorđe Novković with whom Severina started working on her next album. Ja samo pjevam is Severina's best selling album till this day, with more than 55,000 copies sold only in Croatia. The album includes a cover of the song "Dodirni mi kolena" (Touch my knees) by Serbian group Zana. Four singles from the album "Da si moj" (If you were mine), "Ante", "Ja samo pjevam" and "Dodirni mi koljena" were released. The album was not supported by an indoor tour, but on 6 July 2000, she held a solo concert at the Stadion Stari plac in Split in front of more than 20,000 people.

Following the success of her album Pogled ispod obrva (The Look Underneath the Eyebrows) which was released on 15 May 2001, Severina's 2002 concert tour and live album Virujen u te (I Believe in You) won her an award for best selling live album along with a nomination for hit song of the year. Virujen u Te was her first major tour during which she performed in most of the big cities on the Balkans including Sarajevo, Bosnia and Herzegovina and Ljubljana, Slovenia and confirmed her status as one of the most popular Croatian music artists. In 2001, she performed again at the MHJ with the song ‘Ajde, ajde, zlato moje’, and at the end of the year she went on her third tour of Australia. She, along with Dorđe Novković, was the primary author on that album. With the song ‘Virujen u te’, she won the MHJ that same year and won the Grand Prix, and the album ‘Pogled ispod obrva’ became the best-selling album of her career. The album has sold over 30,000 copies in Croatia.

In 2002, she released the live album "Virujen u te (najbolje uživo!)", which was later awarded the award for the best-selling live album. ‘Pogled ispod obrva’ was nominated for album of the year at the Porin discography award, and the song ‘Virujen u te’ for hit of the year.

=== 2003–2010: Career setbacks and Eurovision Song Contest 2006 ===
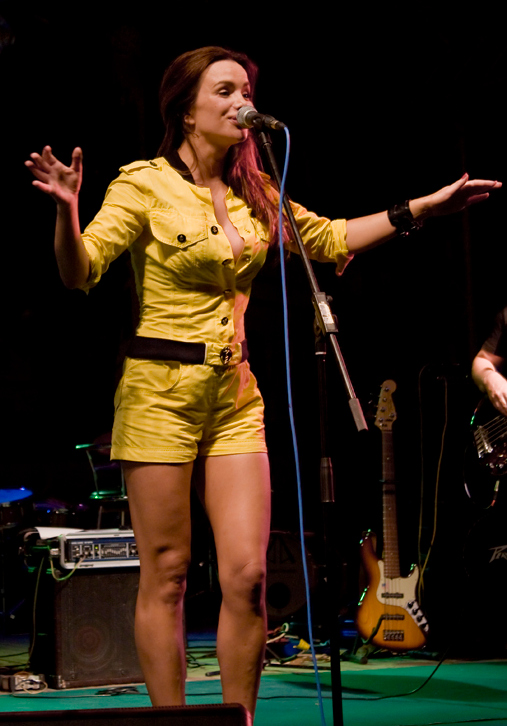
Severina performing in Karlovac in 2008

In 2004, Severina made headlines internationally because of a sex scandal, when a sex tape from 2002 featuring her and Herzegovinian Croat Milan Lučić, leaked on the internet. She said that her manager Tomislav Petrović was the first person to tell her the news and she thought it was a lie. According to her, the video tape was stolen from her property. Milan Lučić was married at the time the video was released and Severina was engaged to Srećko Vargek. Severina was publicly scrutinised, and had to call-off the wedding to Srećko Vargek.

After a two-year break, she released her ninth studio album Severgreen in 2004. This was her first major project and public appearance after the sex-tape scandal which occurred in 2003. The album was influenced by jazz music. Severina also collaborated with Lana Jurčević on the song "Rođena da budem prva" (Born to be first). In 2006, she won the Dora competition with the song "Moja štikla" (My high-heel) and represented Croatia at the Eurovision Song Contest 2006 in Athens, Greece, finishing in 13th place. The song caused controversy in Croatia when several journalists and musicologists claimed the song resembled the music of Serbia. However, prominent Croatian ethno musicians such as Dunja Knebl and Lidija Bajuk disagreed, and both the song's composer Boris Novković and Severina herself have claimed that the song includes Croatian folk music influences from the Dalmatian Hinterland such as ganga and rere singing and lijerica instrumentation. In 2007, she sang the song "Gardelin" for the film "Rooster's Breakfast". She got the role of Baroness Kasteli in the theater play "Gospoda Glembajevi", where her acting skills met with conflicting comments.

After the contest, she started working on her tenth studio album together with Goran Bregović, one of the most successful music composers in the Balkans, and soon Severina's long-anticipated tenth studio album Zdravo Marijo (Hail Mary) was released in May 2008 by Dallas Records The album had songs: "Gas, gas", "Pucajte u tamburaše", "Muškarcu treba samo kurva" (A man only needs a whore), "Gade" (Bastard), "Da nisi možda gej" (If you're not maybe gay), "Ljute cigare" (Spicy cigars), "Tridesete" (Thirties), "What does she have that I don't", "Hail, Mary". The author and producer is Goran Bregović, and the texts were written by Marina Tucaković and Ljilja Jorgovanović. In terms of sales, the album reached first place on charts in Croatia and Slovenia, where Severina was presented with a gold plaque. She started her self-titled tour in Zagreb, which she crowned with a performance in the Belgrade Arena in front of 20,000 people. After having made several public appearances wearing clothes depicting religious imagery (most notably a tight shirt with an image of Virgin Mary with Severina showing ample cleavage), some protested the abuse of religious elements, calling them offensive. However, the album achieved popularity and Severina released four more official music videos for the singles "Tridesete" (Thirties; cover of Sezen Aksu's "Kaçın Kurası"), "Gade" (Bastard), "Haljinica boje lila" (Little Lilac Dress; Nikola Pejaković cover) and the title track. Following the release of the album, Severina went on her second major regional tour. On 15 December 2009, Severina was featured on Miligram's song "Lola", which was included on their self-titled debut album. In 2010, Severina started dating Serbian businessman Milan Popović, and in 2012 gave birth to their first child - a son Aleksandar. She gave birth in Split, and baptized him in Rijeka.

=== 2010–2014: International success ===
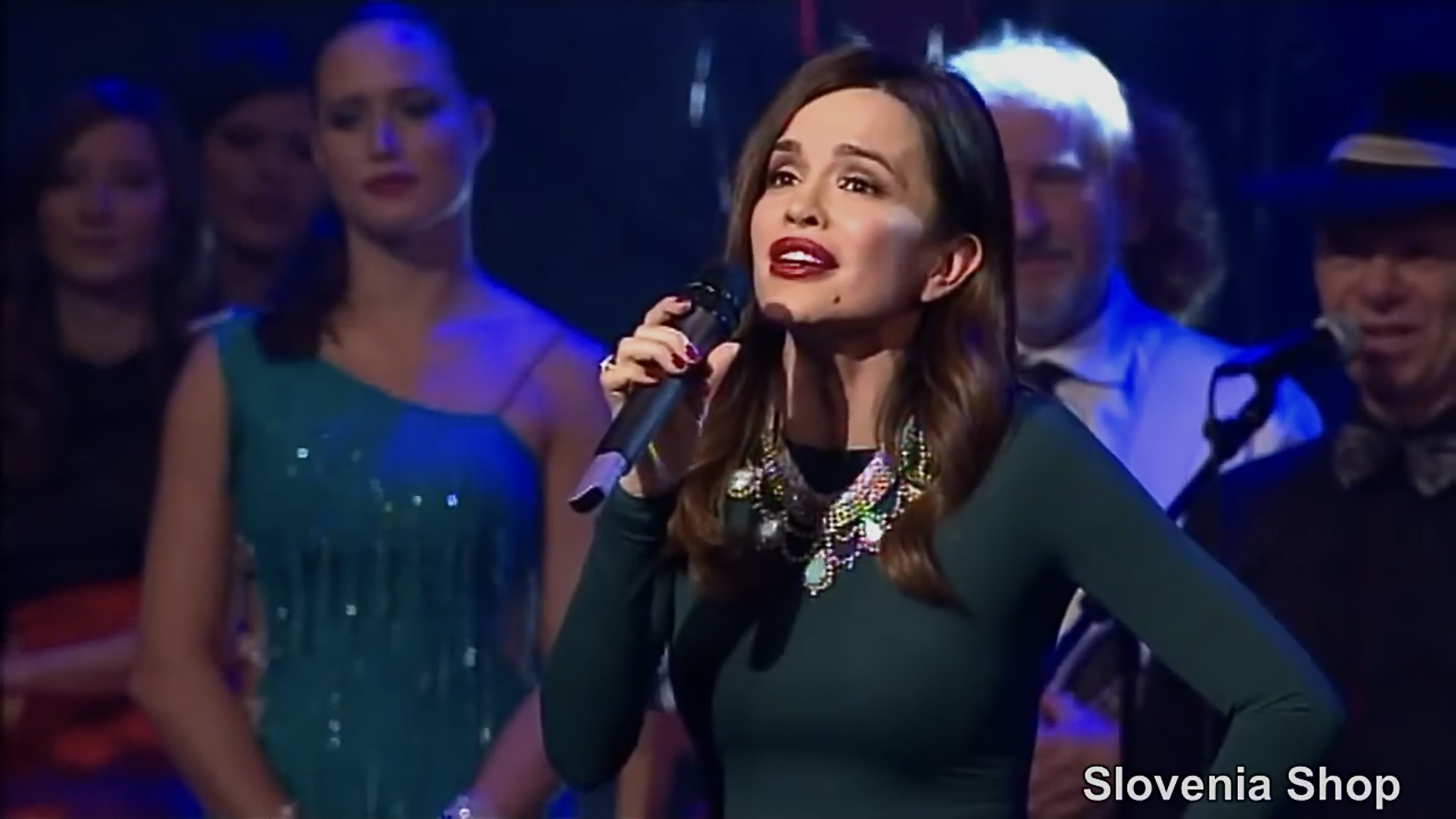
Severina performing in Slovenia, 2014

In December of 2012, Severina released her eleventh studio album Dobrodošao u klub (Welcome to the Club). The album held her at the top of Croatian pop music for all of 2012 and 2013, and established her position as the most popular pop singer in former Yugoslav countries. The album had a total of 12 songs, seven of them singles. In 2011, at the final of the reality show "Big Brother", she announced her new album by singing the single "Brad Pitt", which received a phenomenal response from the audience. "Brad Pitt" became one of the biggest hits of 2011. A few months later, she promoted the track "Grad bez ljudi", which reached a record number of views on YouTube. On YouTube, in just 24 hours after its release, 'Grad bez ljudi', was listened to more than 180,000 times, which was a record for a domestic artist at the time. The songs were composed by Filip Miletić and Miloš Roganović. "Italiana", released in the summer of 2012, was viewed more than half a million times in the first 24 hours, till this day accumulation of that song has 95 million views on YouTube. Later on, she released "Uzbuna" (Alert), the title track "Dobrodošao u klub" and "Tarapana" (Agitation). In support of the album she embarked on her Dobrodošao u Klub Tour. She performed, yet again, in every large city in the region. The tour started in Rijeka in March 2013 and continued in Belgrade (in front of 20,000 people), Zagreb (in front of 19,000 people), Sarajevo (in front of 15,000 people), Ljubljana (in front of 11,000 people) and her native Split (in front of 12,000 people). The whole tour sold more than 250,000 tickets.

In 2013, Severina released the song "Hurem", named after Hürrem Sultan. It was composed and written by Andrej Babić, and the arrangers were Ivan Popeskić and Branko Berković. In March 2014, she released the song "Alcatraz", named after the Alcatraz Prison. Soon after, she released the song "Brazil" to support the Croatia national football team's campaign at the 2014 FIFA World Cup in the country. In 2014, Severina made headlines again, posing completely naked with only a crown on her head on the cover of the February issue of Elle magazine, has also attracted attention beyond the border. The famous designer duo Dolce&Gabbana posted the cover on their official Twitter account with the caption "stunning Croatian pop-folk singer Severina Vučković in Elle Croatia".

In July 2014, she released "Uno momento" (One Moment), a duet with Serbian band Ministarke. The song was noted for its provocative music video. The single was viewed over 728,000 times on YouTube in just 24 hours, breaking the regional record held at the time by the single 'Italiana', which was streamed 500,000 times in its first day. It turned out to be highly popular across the Balkans, becoming a summer hit in Croatia, Serbia, Slovenia and Bosnia and Herzegovina, accumulating more than 130 million views on YouTube.

In October 2014, she released a duet with Serbian singer Saša Matić called "More tuge" (Sea of Sorrow). At the end of 2014, she released the song "Generale" (Hey, General) with the Croatian band Učiteljice, which has more than 77 million views on YouTube.

=== 2015–2019: "Calimero" and Halo (2019) ===
In 2015, Severina released the single "Calimero", which charted in Croatia. Outside music, media coverage focused heavily on her relationship and marriage to Igor Kojić. The couple married in November 2015, making headlines throughout the region.

In 2016, she released singles "Sekunde" (Seconds), and "Silikoni" (Silicone) with Serbian rapper Sajsi MC. Serbian actress Seka Sablić makes an appearance in the "Silikoni" music video, which gained mass media attention for its provocative video and song. She explained "Silicone implants are a metaphor for all the things women do to be perfect. That includes dyeing their hair, removing facial and leg hair, exercising, using tanning beds, dieting, and so on. The line 'you didn't even pay for them' shows that she is independent and can do whatever she wants with her own body. The song is a joke, so don't take it seriously. Sing along even if you don't have implants. It will brighten your day and make you feel like you're perfect. Kids, don't try this at home."

At the beginning of 2017, she released "Kao" (Like), the lead single from her twelfth upcoming studio album. On 27 March 2017, she released the second single, "Otrove" (Poison) featuring Bosnian rapper and producer Jala Brat. Its music video was viewed around 15 million times in less than a month, and 29 million times after two months, and overall 115 million views on her YouTube channel. The third single along with its music video, "Mrtav bez mene" was released on 5 June. In June 2018, she released two music videos for collaborations with Croatian singer Petar Grašo named "Unaprijed gotovo", and with Serbian child singer Ljuba Stanković named "Tutorial". In July 2018, she released the music video for the single "Magija", featuring Jala Brat once again.

In February 2019, she released her long anticipated album Halo (Hello) through Dallas Records. The album contains 17 songs recorded between 2017 and 2019, and the album was produced and written by Tonči Huljić, Vjekoslava Huljić, Jala Brat, Buba Corelli, Marina Tucaković, Milan Laća Radulović, Saša Lazić, Ljiljana Jorgovanović, and Miloš Roganović. In support of the album she embarked on her The Magic Tour, marking her fourth headlining concert tour, which included stops to every major city in SFRJ including Split, Ljubljana, Belgrade and Zagreb.

On 31 March 2022, she published her music video with Bulgarian superstar Azis titled "Fališ mi" (Missing you) on her YouTube Channel. Till this day the music video accumulated more than 86 million views.

=== 2023–present: Sorry & Superstar Hrvatska ===
On 4 July 2023, she released an EP titled "Sorry" with 5 new songs: Sorry, Metak (Bullet) collaboration with Serbian Rapper Nucci, Nebo (Sky) with Sandi Cenov & KIMMV, Pravda za ljubav (Justice for Love) and 100 Stepeni (100 Degrees) with L'Amiral.

In June 2023, Severina was announced as one of the four judges on RTL's singing reality television series Superstar, along with Nika Turković, Tonči Huljić and Filip Miletić. The first season of Superstar aired from September to December 2023. Severina re-joined the judging panel for the show's second season, which premiered in September 2024.

Severina continued as a judge on singing reality show series Superstar, and on the finale of the show, she performed her new song she wrote: "Tako ti je sine moj" ("That's how it is my son"), which was released on 15 December on her YouTube channel. The performance of that song gained positive responses. When talking about the song she said: "It is a lesson that a mother tells her child. I started writing it at the beginning of the year, in order to "shake off" the sadness and anger that came over me after that decision of the Supreme Court, in which they said that my child should be taken away because of a "procedural error" - the singer continued, then concluded: "Then she seemed sad to me, and I didn't care for anything, so I put her aside To Serbia, which fights for justice and does not want to sell honor, and which was supported by fellow students in Croatia - wrote the singer."

For New Year's Eve 2024, Severina performed a concert in Sarajevo with a record audience of 55,000 people and said: "My heart beats for this city!" In August 2025, she released a song "Pumpaj, Seve brate" (Pump it, Seve, brother). In October 2025, Severina announced her 5th tour "Ja samo pjevam", named after her 1999 album Ja samo pjevam (I'm only singing). She sold out her concert in her native Split, inside Arena Gripe on 24 October. Tickets for the Arena Zagreb concert on 7 November sold out within 10 days, leading her to add a second show on 8 November - marking her third time performing inside the arena.

=== Theatre and film ===
In 2003 Severina landed her first theatre role at the Croatian National Theatre in Rijeka (HNK Rijeka) and played the title role in the rock opera Karolina Riječka (Caroline of Rijeka). Two years later she produced and acted in the monodrama Čekajući svog čovika (Waiting for My Man) at the Satirical Theatre Kerempuh in Zagreb. In 2007, she was cast for one of the main roles in HNK Rijeka's musical Gospoda Glembajevi (The Glembays; based upon Miroslav Krleža's 1929 play). Although the decision to cast Severina was met with criticism by some commentators who questioned her acting credentials, the musical premiered in March 2007 with considerable success. Severina also starred along Davor Janjić and Enis Bešlagić in a 2007 Bosnian film Duhovi Sarajeva (Ghosts of Sarajevo), set in Sarajevo. In 2007, she made a five-minute cameo appearance playing herself in the Slovenian film Petelinji zajtrk (Rooster's Breakfast).

== Personal life ==
=== Sex tape scandal ===
In 2004, Vučković was involved in an internationally reported sex scandal after a sex tape featuring her and Herzegovinian Croat businessman Milan Lučić leaked onto the Internet, which was reported by the Croatian online tabloid Index.hr. The graphic nature of the video and the fact that Lučić was married when the tape was filmed shocked the public. Vučković sued the website that released the tape for damages, claiming that the video was stolen from her and that it was her intellectual property. In 2004, part of the lawsuit about intellectual property was dismissed by the court, but violation of privacy was approved with a compensation of 100,000 kunas.

=== Relationships ===
At the beginning of her career, Severina was reported to have been in a relationship with the singer Zrinko Tutić, who was married at the time. Afterwards, she entered into a relationship with singer Alen Marin of the band Kojoti. She later entered into a relationship with music producer Ante Pecotić. In 1999, Severina entered into a brief relationship with the Croatian model Adnan Taletović, whom she met while filming her "Da si moj" (If You Were Mine) music video. In 2000, while still in a relationship with Bosnian-Herzegovinian Croat general Stanko Sopta, she began an affair with Milan Lučić, a married businessman with whom she recorded a sex tape, which was leaked to the public in 2004. At the time of the tape's release, Severina was reported to be in a relationship with Srećko Vargek, but the two soon broke up. Severina soon entered into a relationship with the economist Mate Čuljak. The relationship lasted a year and a half, but the couple broke up one week before Severina's 35th birthday. Severina soon began dating sports entrepreneur Slavko Šainović. After two and a half years of dating, the couple broke up.

In December 2010, Severina met wealthy Serbian businessman Milan Popović at his birthday celebration, where she was hired to perform. They soon began dating, and in August 2011 she announced that she was pregnant with her first child. On 21 February 2012, she gave birth to a boy named Aleksandar in Split. During the period she lived between Belgrade, Vršac and Zagreb. In October 2012, Severina announced that she and Popović have separated and that she has moved back to Zagreb. At the same time it was announced she had her son baptized in a Catholic church in Rijeka. Several months later the couple reunited until separating for good in August 2013. Since then the couple have been embroiled in custody disputes, with Popović claiming he was not allowed access to see their son, a claim Severina denied.

On 22 November 2015, Severina married 15-year younger Serbian footballer Igor Kojić (son of Serbian musician Dragan Kojić Keba) in Bale, Istria. The celebration was held at the "Genex Impuls Hall" hotel in New Belgrade, and the couple came to the "stojadina". The song to which they played the first dance was "Zlato moje", sung by Petar Grašo. The wedding was attended by a large number of people from the entertainment industry such as Lepa Brena, Rada Manojlović, Željko Joksimović, Nada Topčagić, Goran Karan, Džej Ramadanovski, Aca Lukas and others. After 6 years the couple formally divorced in Zagreb on 19 August 2021.

=== Political views ===
In 2013, Severina publicly supported the LGBT community in Croatia ahead of the 2013 Croatian constitutional referendum.

Severina has expressed Yugoslavist and antifascist views, and stated on social media that "Anti-fascism is the greatest concept in the world" on the same day that Croatian nationalist singer Marko Perković, who with his fans has numerous controversies involving Ustaše glorification, performed in Zagreb. At a New Year's concert in Sarajevo on January 1, 2025, in front of the Eternal Flame on Ulica Maršala Tita, she told an audience of 55,000: "May this year bring peace to all of us and to the entire region, or rather to all of Yugoslavia – a Yugoslavia that politics has divided, but we are uniting it".

Severina has supported the State of Palestine during her performances. In 2025, she joined a campaign by the Slovenian non-governmental organisation Inštitut 8. marec to suspend the EU-Israel trade agreement.

=== Controversies ===
On 25 August 2024, when scheduled to perform at a birthday party in Belgrade, Vučković was denied entry into Serbia on the Bajakovo border crossing. According to media and herself, she was denied entry due to her comments on the Srebrenica genocide which she made shortly after the United Nations designated 11 July as the annual International Day of Reflection and Commemoration of the 1995 Genocide in Srebrenica. Additionally, she claimed that Serbian police asked her about Operation Storm, Jasenovac and Franjo Tuđman. She blamed this incident on Aleksandar Vučić and his political regime and claimed that he was the one who prohibited her from entering Serbia. Shortly after news of the incident broke, she stated that she would never enter Serbia while Aleksandar Vučić remains in power. Serbian Minister of Internal affairs Ivica Dačić later stated that she would be removed from their list of "verbal offenders".

=== Family affairs ===
In 2022, Severina got into a physical altercation with her older sister Marijana Vučković in their home in Split, Croatia. According to RTL Televizija, her sister is not in a close or good relationship with their mother or their family, and Marijana apparently reported Severina to social welfare for negligence over their mother. Marijana also accused Severina of drug use and blamed Severina for her poor mental health. Severina's defense team claims that Marijana is purposely trying to make Severina look as bad as possible, since she is in legal custody battle with the father of her child Milan Popović. Severina filed a criminal report against her sister, but later dropped it.

== Discography ==
=== Studio albums ===
- Severina (1990)
- Severina (1992)
- Dalmatinka (1993)
- Trava zelena (1995)
- Moja stvar (1996)
- Djevojka sa sela (1998)
- Ja samo pjevam (1999)
- Pogled ispod obrva (2001)
- Severgreen (2004)
- Zdravo Marijo (2008)
- Dobrodošao u klub (2012)
- Halo (2019)

=== EPs ===
- Moja štikla / Moj sokole (2006)
- Sorry (2023)

=== Live albums ===
- Paloma nera – uživo (1993)
- Virujen u te (najbolje uživo!) (2002)
- Tridesete – uživo (2010)
- Dobrodošao u klub (Live) (2014)

=== Singles ===
Title	Year	Peak chart positions		Album
Title	Year	CRO	CRO Billb.	Album
"Vodi me na ples"	1990	*	(Note: Billboard launched the Croatia Songs chart on 15 February 2022.)	Severina (1990)
"Tvoja prva djevojka"	1992	*	(Note: Billboard launched the Croatia Songs chart on 15 February 2022.)	Severina (1992)
"Kad si sam"	1992	*	(Note: Billboard launched the Croatia Songs chart on 15 February 2022.)	Severina (1992)
"Dalmatinka"	1993	*	(Note: Billboard launched the Croatia Songs chart on 15 February 2022.)	Dalmatinka
"Paloma nera"	1993	*	(Note: Billboard launched the Croatia Songs chart on 15 February 2022.)	Dalmatinka
"Trava zelena"	1995	*	(Note: Billboard launched the Croatia Songs chart on 15 February 2022.)	Trava zelena
"Ti si srce moje"	1995	*	(Note: Billboard launched the Croatia Songs chart on 15 February 2022.)	Trava zelena
"Moja stvar"	1996	*	(Note: Billboard launched the Croatia Songs chart on 15 February 2022.)	Moja stvar
"Od rođendana do rođendana"	1996	*	(Note: Billboard launched the Croatia Songs chart on 15 February 2022.)	Moja stvar
"Djevojka sa sela"	1998	9	(Note: Billboard launched the Croatia Songs chart on 15 February 2022.)	Djevojka sa sela
"Rastajem se od života" (with Željko Bebek)	1998	10	(Note: Billboard launched the Croatia Songs chart on 15 February 2022.)	Djevojka sa sela
"Sija sunce, trava miriše"	1998	10	(Note: Billboard launched the Croatia Songs chart on 15 February 2022.)	Djevojka sa sela
"Prijateljice"	1999	10	(Note: Billboard launched the Croatia Songs chart on 15 February 2022.)	Djevojka sa sela
"Da si moj"	1999	8	(Note: Billboard launched the Croatia Songs chart on 15 February 2022.)	Ja samo pjevam
"Ante"	1999	*	(Note: Billboard launched the Croatia Songs chart on 15 February 2022.)	Ja samo pjevam
"Ja samo pjevam"	2000	3	(Note: Billboard launched the Croatia Songs chart on 15 February 2022.)	Ja samo pjevam
"Dodirni mi koljena"	2000	*	(Note: Billboard launched the Croatia Songs chart on 15 February 2022.)	Ja samo pjevam
"Daj mi, daj"	2000	3	(Note: Billboard launched the Croatia Songs chart on 15 February 2022.)	Dora 2000.
"Ajde, ajde zlato moje"	2000	5	(Note: Billboard launched the Croatia Songs chart on 15 February 2022.)	Pogled ispod obrva
"Krivi spoj"	2001	*	(Note: Billboard launched the Croatia Songs chart on 15 February 2022.)	Pogled ispod obrva
"Virujen u te"	2001	1	(Note: Billboard launched the Croatia Songs chart on 15 February 2022.)	Pogled ispod obrva
"Mili moj"	2001	1	(Note: Billboard launched the Croatia Songs chart on 15 February 2022.)	Pogled ispod obrva
"Mala je dala"	2001	2	(Note: Billboard launched the Croatia Songs chart on 15 February 2022.)	Pogled ispod obrva
"'Ko je kriv" (with Boris Novković)	2002	1	(Note: Billboard launched the Croatia Songs chart on 15 February 2022.)	'Ko je kriv
"Pogled ispod obrva" (Live)	2003	*	(Note: Billboard launched the Croatia Songs chart on 15 February 2022.)	Virujen u te (najbolje uživo!)
"Hrvatica" (featuring Bizzo)	2004	1	(Note: Billboard launched the Croatia Songs chart on 15 February 2022.)	Severgreen
"Adam i Seva (Turkish Chicken)"	2005	5	(Note: Billboard launched the Croatia Songs chart on 15 February 2022.)	Severgreen
"Moja štikla"	2006	6	(Note: Billboard launched the Croatia Songs chart on 15 February 2022.)	Moja štikla / Moj sokole
"Gas, gas"	2008	2	(Note: Billboard launched the Croatia Songs chart on 15 February 2022.)	Zdravo Marijo
"Tridesete"	2008	2	(Note: Billboard launched the Croatia Songs chart on 15 February 2022.)	Zdravo Marijo
"Zdravo Marijo"	2009	—	(Note: Billboard launched the Croatia Songs chart on 15 February 2022.)	Zdravo Marijo
"Gade"	2009	6	(Note: Billboard launched the Croatia Songs chart on 15 February 2022.)	Zdravo Marijo
"Haljinica boje lila"	2009	—	(Note: Billboard launched the Croatia Songs chart on 15 February 2022.)	Zdravo Marijo
"'Ko to pita"	2009	—	(Note: Billboard launched the Croatia Songs chart on 15 February 2022.)	Festival zabavne glazbe Split 2009.
"Lola" (with Miligram)	2010	6	(Note: Billboard launched the Croatia Songs chart on 15 February 2022.)	Miligram
"Nevira"	2010	—	(Note: Billboard launched the Croatia Songs chart on 15 February 2022.)	Festival zabavne glazbe – Split 2010.
"Brad Pitt"	2011	1	(Note: Billboard launched the Croatia Songs chart on 15 February 2022.)	Dobrodošao u klub
"Grad bez ljudi"	2011	1	(Note: Billboard launched the Croatia Songs chart on 15 February 2022.)	Dobrodošao u klub
"Italiana" (with Ana Bebić)	2012	1	(Note: Billboard launched the Croatia Songs chart on 15 February 2022.)	Dobrodošao u klub
"Uzbuna"	2012	1	(Note: Billboard launched the Croatia Songs chart on 15 February 2022.)	Dobrodošao u klub
"Dobrodošao u klub"	2013	2	(Note: Billboard launched the Croatia Songs chart on 15 February 2022.)	Dobrodošao u klub
"Ostavljena"	2013	—	(Note: Billboard launched the Croatia Songs chart on 15 February 2022.)	Dobrodošao u klub
"Hurem"	2013	7	(Note: Billboard launched the Croatia Songs chart on 15 February 2022.)	Non-album singles
"Alcatraz"	2014	11	(Note: Billboard launched the Croatia Songs chart on 15 February 2022.)	Non-album singles
"Brazil"	2014	8	(Note: Billboard launched the Croatia Songs chart on 15 February 2022.)	Non-album singles
"Uno momento" (featuring Ministarke)	2014	—	(Note: Billboard launched the Croatia Songs chart on 15 February 2022.)	Dobrodošao u klub (Live) and Kiseonik
"More tuge" (with Saša Matić)	2014	—	(Note: Billboard launched the Croatia Songs chart on 15 February 2022.)	Dobrodošao u klub (Live) and Zabranjena ljubav
"Generale" (with Učiteljice)	2014	7	(Note: Billboard launched the Croatia Songs chart on 15 February 2022.)	Luda kuća
"Calimero"	2015	11	(Note: Billboard launched the Croatia Songs chart on 15 February 2022.)	Non-album single
"Sta je svit" (with Goran Karan)	2015	1	(Note: Billboard launched the Croatia Songs chart on 15 February 2022.)	Naša bila štorija
"Manta me jubav" (with Goran Karan, Danijela Martinović and Giuliano)	2016	16	(Note: Billboard launched the Croatia Songs chart on 15 February 2022.)	Naša bila štorija
"Sekunde"	2016	12	(Note: Billboard launched the Croatia Songs chart on 15 February 2022.)	Non-album singles
"Silikoni" (featuring Sajsi MC)	2016	—	(Note: Billboard launched the Croatia Songs chart on 15 February 2022.)	Non-album singles
"Kao"	2017	4	(Note: Billboard launched the Croatia Songs chart on 15 February 2022.)	Halo
"Otrove" (featuring Jala Brat)	2017	—	(Note: Billboard launched the Croatia Songs chart on 15 February 2022.)	Halo
"Mrtav bez mene"	2017	—	(Note: Billboard launched the Croatia Songs chart on 15 February 2022.)	Halo
"Kuda za vikend"	2017	32	(Note: Billboard launched the Croatia Songs chart on 15 February 2022.)	Non-album singles
"Hazarder" (featuring Leon)	2017	—	(Note: Billboard launched the Croatia Songs chart on 15 February 2022.)	Non-album singles
"Unaprijed gotovo" (featuring Petar Grašo)	2018	4	(Note: Billboard launched the Croatia Songs chart on 15 February 2022.)	Halo
"Tutorial" (featuring Ljuba Stanković)	2018	—	(Note: Billboard launched the Croatia Songs chart on 15 February 2022.)	Halo
"Magija" (featuring Jala Brat)	2018	—	(Note: Billboard launched the Croatia Songs chart on 15 February 2022.)	Halo
"Imaš pravo"	2018	6	(Note: Billboard launched the Croatia Songs chart on 15 February 2022.)	Halo
"Halo"	2019	36	(Note: Billboard launched the Croatia Songs chart on 15 February 2022.)	Halo
"Rođeno moje"	2019	15	(Note: Billboard launched the Croatia Songs chart on 15 February 2022.)	Non-album singles
"Fališ mi" (featuring Azis)	2022	—	—	Non-album singles
"Vjerujem u Boga"	2022	15	20	Non-album singles
"Tako ti je, sine moj"	2024	10	—	Non-album singles
"Pumpaj, Seve brate!"	2025	91	—	Non-album singles
"Nisam kriva ja (Bezosjećajna)"	2026	—	—	Non-album singles
"Pozovi me ti (Anksiozna)"	2026	—	—	Non-album singles
"Svirajte mi 'Rađaj sinove' (Savršena)"	2026	—	—	Non-album singles

=== Other charted songs ===
Title	Year	Peak chart positions	Album
Title	Year	CRO Billb.	Album
"Metak" (with Nucci)	2023	20	Sorry
"Aritmije" (Jala Brat and Buba Corelli featuring Severina)	2024	24	Goat Season (Part Two)

== Filmography ==
Films starred

- Gdje je nestala Slovenija? (2004)
- Duhovi Sarajeva (2005)
- Rooster's Breakfast (2007)
- The Last Serb in Croatia (2019)

Documentaries

- Kad se pretvorim u Severinu (When I turn into Severina) (2009)

== Tours ==
=== Headlining ===
- Virujen u te Tour (2001-02)
- Tridesete Tour (2008–12)
- Dobrodošao u Klub Tour (2013)
- The Magic Tour (2019)
- Ja samo pjevam Tour (2022–25)

== See else ==
- Category:People from Split, Croatia
- Music of Croatia
- Popular music in Croatia
- List of one-word stage names

== Notes ==
Achievements
Preceded by Boris Novković with "Vukovi umiru sami"	Croatia in the Eurovision Song Contest; 2006	Succeeded by Dragonfly feat. Dado Topić with "Vjerujem u ljubav"
