= The Magic Tour (Severina) =

2019 concert tour by Severina

- Tour by Severina
- Promotional poster for the tour
- Associated album: Halo
- Start date: 16 November 2019
- End date: 21 December 2019
- Legs: 1
- No. of shows: Total 4

Severina concert chronology
- Dobrodošao u Klub Tour (2013); The Magic Tour (2019); ...

The Magic Tour was the third headlining concert tour by Croatian pop-folk singer Severina, launched in support of her twelfth studio album Halo. The all-arena tour, with four big concerts and superb production began on November 16, 2019, in Split and concluded on December 12, 2019, in Ljubljana. The tour showcased all of the material from Severina's twelfth studio album in addition to her earlier releases, from previous eleven albums. Members of team Music producer concert and live video sound record ; Žarko Fabek Febo Light design ; Črt Birsa Musicians : Damir Šomen drums Mario Kopecki Bass Mario Novaković keyboard Fedor Boić keyboard Ivan Pešut guitar Dario Mihić guitar Alenka Milano back vocal 10 string musician's

== Background ==
After her previous big regional Dobrodošao u Klub Tour, which was seen by over 150 thousand people, that could be placed alongside the big world tours, and after releasing her twelfth studio album Halo, Severina announces a new, even more spectacular tour, titled 'The Magic Tour'. Severina's third regional tour in a row, started on November 16 in her native Split, Croatia, after which this continued in other big cities of the Balkans, such as Zagreb, Belgrade and Ljubljana. The production surpasses anything seen so far, a team of top artists has been selected, while over 100 people involved in the organization and as many as 15 equipment haulers will travel with Severina throughout the region. Ticket sales for concerts in Split and Zagreb started on September 5. through the Eventim at 10 a.m., while ticket sales for the concert in Belgrade on September 10. through the Ticket.rs system.

== Set list ==
This set list is representative of the concert on December 7, 2019, at Arena Zagreb. It does not represent all concerts for the duration of the tour.

1. "Otrove"
2. "Losha"
3. "Brad Pitt"
4. "Generale"
5. "Pogled ispod obrva" / "Šta me sad pitaš šta mi je"
6. "Dalmatinka"
7. "More tuge"
8. "Popila"
9. "Kuma"
10. "Uno momento"
11. "Tarapana"
12. "Imaš pravo"
13. "Kao"
14. "Grad bez ljudi"
15. "Virujen u te"
16. "Theme from New York, New York" (John Kander cover)
17. "Mili moj"
18. "Prijateljice"
19. "Mrtav bez mene"
20. "Daleko ti kuća"
21. "Unaprijed gotovo"
22. "Fatamorgana"
23. "Hurem"
24. "Ko me tjero"
25. "Paloma nera"
26. "Tutorial" (with Ljuba Stanković)
27. "Cesarica" (Oliver Dragojević cover)
28. "Magija"
29. "Dobrodošao u klub"
30. "Tvoja prva djevojka"
31. "Uzbuna"
32. "Krivi spoj"
33. "Moja štikla"
34. "Djevojka sa sela"
35. "Rođeno moje"
36. "Ja samo pjevam"
37. "Gas gas"
38. "Italiana"

== Tour dates ==
List of concerts, showing date, city, country and venue
Date	City	Country	Venue	Attendance
Europe
16 November 2019	Split	Croatia	Spaladium Arena	19,000
23 November 2019	Belgrade	Serbia	Štark Arena	22,000
7 December 2019	Zagreb	Croatia	Arena Zagreb	23,000
21 December 2019	Ljubljana	Slovenia	Arena Stožice	15,000
Attendance				79,000
