= Luka Nižetić discography =

- Studio albums: 6
- Live albums: 1
- Singles: 41

Croatian singer Luka Nižetić has released six studio albums, one live album and 41 singles.

Nižetić's debut studio album Premijera was released in 2005 and spawned four singles. His second album titled Slobodno dišem was released in 2007 and spawned four singles. A year later in 2008, Nižetić released his third album, Na tren i zauvijek. The album peaked in the top 20 in Croatian and spawned five singles. In the 2010s he released two studio albums; Kad zasvira... in 2013 and Ljubav je mukte in 2018. Nižetić's sixth studio album Ludilo brale was released in late 2022.

During his career Nižetić released multiple top 10 singles. Among some of his highest charting singles are "U snovima", "Ludilo brale" and "Ae", respectively. "Prava ljubav", a collaboration with Croatian singer Lana Jurčević, is considered to be both of the artists' signature song.

== Albums ==
=== Studio albums ===
Title	Details	Peak chart positions
Title	Details	CRO
Premijera	Released: 25 March 2005; Formats: Digital download, CD, streaming; Label: Menart	—
Slobodno dišem	Released: 2 January 2007; Formats: Digital download, CD, streaming; Label: Menart	11
Na tren i zauvijek	Released: 1 January 2008; Formats: Digital download, CD, streaming; Label: Menart	10
Kad zasvira...	Released: 4 June 2012; Formats: Digital download, CD, streaming; Label: Menart	42
Ljubav je mukte	Released: 23 May 2018; Formats: Digital download, CD, streaming; Label: Menart	—
Ludilo brale	Released: 7 October 2022; Formats: Digital download, CD, streaming; Label: Dallas Records	—

=== Live albums ===
Title	Details	Peak chart positions
Title	Details	CRO
Live 09	Released: 2 January 2010; Formats: Digital download, CD, streaming; Label: Menart	—

== Singles ==
Title	Year	Peak chart positions	Album
Title	Year	CRO	Album
"Ne krivi me"	2004	—	Premijera
"Tebi pjevam"	2004	—	Premijera
"Ponekad poželim"	2004	—	Premijera
"Proljeće"	2005	—	Premijera
"Meni trebaš ti"	2005	—	Non-album single
"Prava ljubav" (with Lana Jurčević)	2006	1	Slobodno dišem
"More"	2006	13	Slobodno dišem
"Pusti me u san"	2007	—	Slobodno dišem
"Samo mi reci da" (with Klapa Nostalgija)	2007	8	Slobodno dišem
"Zapleši sa mnom"	2008	1	Na tren i zauvijek
"U mislima"	2008	1	Na tren i zauvijek
"Di si ti Mare"	2008	—	Na tren i zauvijek
"Na tren i zauvijek"	2008	1	Na tren i zauvijek
"Ako uzmeš ljubav vrati"	2008	2	Na tren i zauvijek
"Za loše vijesti nemamo vremena"	2009	—	Na tren i zauvijek
"Otkad ljubim te"	2010	—	Non-album single
"Tamo gdje me srce vuče"	2011	—	Kad zasvira...
"Kad zasvira orkestar"	2011	—	Kad zasvira...
"Jugo"	2012	21	Kad zasvira...
"Nisu godine"	2012	—	Kad zasvira...
"U snovima"	2013	3	Kad zasvira...
"Vječno"	2013	7	Ljubav je mukte
"Upomoć"	2014	32	Ljubav je mukte
"Od najgorih najbolji" (with Lana Jurčević)	2015	13	Ljubav je mukte
"Amsterdam"	2015	4	Ljubav je mukte
"Mate Misho"	2015	18	Ljubav je mukte
"Ljubav je mukte"	2016	18	Ljubav je mukte
"Malo fjaka, malo party"	2016	25	Ljubav je mukte
"Kad tuga umiri proljeće" (with Tamburaši za dušu)	2016	27	Ljubav je mukte
"Ne ne ne da da da"	2017	11	Ljubav je mukte
"Lagano"	2017	21	Ljubav je mukte
"Voli me kao kiša"	2017	9	Ljubav je mukte
"Radim što želim"	2018	25	Non-album singles
"Brutalero"	2019	11	Non-album singles
"Ludilo brale" (with Rene Bitorajac & Miroslav Škoro)	2019	5	Ludilo bralo
"Život je let"	2020	11	Non-album single
"Ae" (with Klapa Kampanel)	2020	4	Ludilo brale
"Ka more je život"	2020	11	Ludilo brale
"Ostani dite"	2021	7	Ludilo brale
"Ako tražiš ljubav"	2022	7	Ludilo brale
"Zagrli život"	2022	2	Ludilo brale
"Kad se rodiš usrid Splita"	2022	3	Ludilo brale
"Južina"	2025	2	Dora 2025.
"—" denotes the single was not released in the country or did not manage to place on the chart.

== Videography ==
=== Music videos ===
Title	Year	Director(s)	Ref.
"Brutalero"	2019	Sandra Mihaljević	
"Ludilo Brale"	2019	Sandra Mihaljević	
"Život je let"	2020	Darko Drinovac	
"Ae"	2020	Dinko Šimac	
"Ka more je život"	2020	Sandra Mihaljević	
"Ostani dite"	2021	Filip Gržinčić	
"Ako tražiš ljubav"	2022	Darko Drinovac	
"Zagrli život"	2022	Luka Nižetić, Luka Vidović	
"Kad se rodiš usrid Splita"	2022	Dinko Šimac	
