= So Messed Up =

2020 single by La Lana

Single by La Lana
- Released: 31 January 2020
- Studio: Sharpe Genuine Studios (Los Angeles, California, United States)
- Genre: Pop
- Length: 2:58
- Label: Warner Music Poland
- Songwriters: Damon Sharpe; Eric Sanicola; Jazelle Rodriguez; Omar Tavarez
- Producers: Damon Sharpe; Eric Sanicola

Lana Jurčević singles chronology
"Upalimo ljubav" (2018)	"So Messed Up" (2020)	"How Will I Know" (2020)

Music video
- "So Messed Up" on YouTube

Remix cover

Yung Baby Tate singles chronology
"Damn Daniel" (2020)	"So Messed Up" (2020)	"B.O.M.B.S." (2020)

Remix lyric video
- "So Messed Up" on YouTube

"So Messed Up" is the debut international single by Croatian pop singer La Lana. It was released on 31 January 2020 by Warner Music. It was written and produced by Damon Sharpe and Eric Sanicola, with additional writing from Jazelle Rodriguez and Omar Tavarez. The song is the artist's first one in English since 2012's "Bad Boys", which is featured on her fourth studio album Pobjede i porazi. The song peaked at number two on Croatian Airplay Chart. On 14 May, a remix featuring American rapper Yung Baby Tate was released.

== Background and release ==
Following her 2018 single "Upalimo ljubav" (Let's Turn On Love) with Slovenian singer Luka Basi, Lana Jurčević took a brief hiatus. On 14 January 2020, she claimed that during the hiatus "a lot of things had changed" and that "she was at the turning point of her life". After deleting all posts off her Instagram account, on 21 January 2020 Jurčević broke the silence on the platform and announced that she had signed a contract with Warner Music, marking the beginning of her international career under the stage name La Lana.

The official release date was revealed on 25 January. Lana posted a brief snippet of the song and the music video on 27 January. The title and the cover art were revealed a day before the release.

On 6 May, Lana posted a teaser of a remix on her Instagram account without revealing the name of the featured artist, asking followers to try to guess who they are. On 8 May, she confirmed that it is American rapper Yung Baby Tate and announced the remix release date. On 11 May, Lana posted a snippet of Tate's verse. The remix was released on 14 May alongside the lyric video.

== Music video ==
The music video was released alongside the single. It was directed by Camilo Paredes and shot in Berlin, Germany. The video depicts the inner battle between the "cool and laid-back" Lana and her "wacky" alter-ego, who jumps out of a car trunk with a black rooster in her hands. Lana subsequently revealed that having a rooster in the video was her own idea.

== Reception ==
Immediately upon the release, the song and the music video drew comparisons to the work of English singer Dua Lipa, particularly to Lipa's "IDGAF" music video. Jutarnji list also drew a comparison between the singers' backgrounds, claiming that if Lipa, who originally hails from Kosovo, "managed to reach international success", then Lana could succeed in doing so as well, despite being from a "small country like Croatia". Tportal.hr called the song "a mixture of 'Sorry' by Justin Bieber and 'Never Really Over' by Katy Perry" and stated that Lana's appearance in the video was heavily influenced by Lipa, Billie Eilish and Senidah.

== Track listing ==
- Digital download
1. "So Messed Up" – 2:58
- Digital download – Remix
1. "So Messed Up" (featuring Yung Baby Tate) – 2:55

== Credits and personnel ==
- La Lana – vocals
- Yung Baby Tate – guest vocals
- Damon Sharpe – songwriting, production, recording
- Eric Sanicola – songwriting, production
- Jazelle Rodriguez – songwriting
- Omar Tavarez – songwriting
- Trevor Muzzy – mixing
- Randy Merrill – mastering

== Charts ==
Chart	Peak position
Croatia (Croatian Airplay Chart)	2
