= Edita Aradinović =

Serbian singer-songwriter (born 1993)

Edita Едита
- Born: Edita Aradinović; 30 June 1993 (age 33); Belgrade, Serbia, FR Yugoslavia
- Genres: Pop; pop-folk; electropop
- Occupations: Singer; songwriter
- Instruments: Vocals
- Years active: 2012–present
- Labels: FM Play; Grand; IDJTunes
- Formerly of: Ministarke

Edita Aradinović (Serbian Cyrillic: Едита Арадиновић, pronounced [edǐta aradǐːnoʋitɕ]; born 30 June 1993), professionally known as Edita, is a Serbian singer and songwriter. She rose to prominence in 2014 as the lead vocalist of the band Ministarke. Edita eventually left the band in 2018 to pursue a solo career. After a number of standalone singles, she released her debut album, Ljuštura, in 2023.

Aradinović has appeared on the television shows Zvezde Granda and Tvoje lice zvuči poznato.

== Early life ==
Edita Aradinović was born 30 June 1993, in Belgrade, Federal Republic of Yugoslavia. Her father is Albanian from Kosovo and her mother is of Egyptian descent. She is the younger sister of singer Indira Aradinović, professionally known as Indy. When Edita was twelve, her older brother Semir died at twenty-one from complications of Down syndrome. Aradinović is also related to performers Gagi and Đorđe Đogani.

After finishing eighth grade, Aradinović attended a technical high school to study design, but later dropped out.

== Career ==
Aradinović competed on the singing competition show Zvezde Granda in 2010. Two years later, she released her first song "Overila". Subsequently, Aradinović rose to prominence after she had joined the band Ministarke in 2013, which was founded by Filip Miletić and Miloš Roganović. In October 2013, Ministarke released their breakthrough single "Poplava" with Aco Pejović. They also collaborated with Severina on "Uno Momento" in July 2014, which has collected over 125 million views on YouTube. Their eponymous debut album was released in December 2015.

In 2017, Aradinović was a contestant on the fourth season of Tvoje lice zvuči poznato, where she placed as the second runner-up. In March the following year, Edita announced that she had left Ministarke and that she would pursue a solo career. Edita released a duet with Aco Pejović, titled "Blud i nemoral", under IDJTunes in October 2018. The music video for the song has amassed over 50 million views. Her first solo single "Magnum" was subsequently released in May 2019. Later that year, Edita returned to Tvoje lice zvuči poznato for the fifth season, where she was paired up with kickboxer Nenad Pagonis.

In September 2021, Edita performed at the Music Week Festival in Ušće, Belgrade. In April 2022, Aradinović announced her supposed debut solo album, titled 08, and released the lead single "Egomanija" a day later. Later in June, She released the single "Štikla", which peaked at number 5 on Billboard's Croatia Songs chart. On September 16, Edita performed at the Tašmajdan Center during the EuroPride event, hosted in Belgrade. On October 14, 2023, Aradinović released her debut album, ultimately entitled Ljuštura, through IDJTunes.

== Personal life ==
Aradinović revealed in 2018 she has undergone three vocal cord surgeries. In June 2022, Edita had another procedure on her vocal cords that changed her timbre. In January 2026, Aradinović revealed her first pregnancy; she is due to have a baby girl in July 2026.

== Discography ==
Edita discography
- Studio albums: 1 (2)
- EPs: 1
- Live albums: 2
- Singles: 44 (51)
- Promotional singles: 4 (9)

=== Albums ===
==== Studio albums ====
Title
Details
Notes
Kiseonik
(as part of Ministarke)
- Released: 1 December 2015
- Label: FM Play
- Format: CD, digital download, streaming
Track listing
- Digital edition
  No.	Title	Length
  1.	"Boing 747"	4:20
  2.	"Gram emocija"	4:15
  3.	"Kiseonik"	3:41
  4.	"Mrtav ili živ"	3:42
  5.	"Paradox"	3:46
  Total length:		19:44
  Physical edition
  No.	Title	Length
  6.	"Poplava" (featuring Aco Pejović)	3:26
  7.	"Uno momento" (Severina featuring Ministarke)	3:29
  8.	"Zver" (featuring Saša Matić)	3:23
  9.	"Duni vetre"	2:41
  Total length:		32:43
Ljuštura
- Released: 14 October 2023
- Label: IDJTunes
- Format: Digital download, streaming
Track listing
- No.	Title	Length
  1.	"Radioaktivna"	3:17
  2.	"Atlantida"	2:25
  3.	"Budi mi dobro ti"	3:07
  4.	"Sex i grad"	3:00
  5.	"Ljuštura"	3:34
  6.	"Monica Bellucci"	2:55
  7.	"Plavi"	3:15
  8.	"Ko te pita"	2:20
  Total length:		23:53

==== Live albums ====
Title	Details
Kafansko veče (Live)	Released: 12 April 2023; Label: Valentino Records; Format: Digital download, streaming
Live Session (with Ushto Funk)	Released: 24 June 2026; Label: IDJTunes; Format: Digital download, streaming

=== Extended plays ===
Title
Cinematic
Details
- Released: 27 November 2024
- Label: IDJTunes
- Format: Digital download, streaming
Notes
Track listing
- No.	Title	Length
  1.	"Gde sunce zalazi"	3:38
  2.	"Kap po kap"	2:57
  3.	"Fuego"	2:28
  4.	"00:08"	3:12
  Total length:		12:15

=== Singles ===
==== As lead artist ====
Title	Year	Peak chart positions	Album
Title	Year	CRO Billb.	Album
"Overila"	2012	*	Non-album single
as part of Ministarke
"Poplava" (featuring Aco Pejović)	2013	*	Kiseonik
"Duni vetre"	2014	*	Kiseonik
"Zver" (featuring Saša Matić)	2015	*	Kiseonik and Zabranjena ljubav
"Moje jedino"	2016	*	Ministarke EP
"Zauzeto"	2017	*	Ministarke
"Tutto completo"	2017	*	Ministarke
as a solo artist
"Blud i nemoral" (featuring Aco Pejović)	2018	*	Non-album singles
"Magnum"	2019	*	Non-album singles
"Životinje"	2019	*	Non-album singles
"Soba"	2019	*	Non-album singles
"Slobodno me rani"	2020	*	Non-album singles
"Kokuzna vremena"	2020	*	Non-album singles
"A kapela"	2020	*	Non-album singles
"Ja sam tvoj dom"	2020	*	Non-album singles
"Melek"	2021	*	Non-album singles
"Varalica" (with Sara Jo)	2021	*	Non-album singles
"Magla" (with Henny)	2022	—	Non-album singles
"Egomanija"	2022	—	Non-album singles
"Štikla"	2022	5	Non-album singles
"Blef" (with MC Stojan and Teodora)	2022	—	Non-album singles
"Pucaj mi u srce"	2022	—	Non-album singles
"Budale" (with Rasta)	2022	—	Non-album singles
"00:08"	2022	—	Cinematic
"Etida" (with Džordži)	2022	—	Non-album singles
"Venom"	2022	—	Non-album singles
"1001"	2022	—	Non-album singles
"Život bez nas"	2023	—	Non-album singles
"Džaba ti"	2023	—	Non-album singles
"Baš smo uspeli" (with Tropico Band)	2023	—	Namerno
"Zbog tebe" (with Rimski)	2024	—	Non-album singles
"Rio Rio" (with Sergej Pajić)	2024	—	Non-album singles
"Baile de gusle" (with Sara Zinaić)	2024	—	Non-album singles
"Gde sunce zalazi"	2024	—	Cinematic
"Kap po kap"	2024	—	Cinematic
"Fuego"	2024	—	Cinematic
"Sama"	2025	—	Non-album single
"Od mene se odvikavaj"	2025	—	Damir Handanović – Novi zvuk
"Srce ledeno" (with Henny)	2025	—	Non-album singles
"Đavole" (with Voyage)	2025	21	Non-album singles
"Riba i po"	2025	—	Non-album singles
"Nemo" (with Sergej Pajić)	2025	—	Večno leto
"Dilema"	2025	—	Non-album singles
"Livada"	2026	—	Non-album singles
"Kišobran za suze"	2026	—	Non-album singles
"Bato"	2026	—	Non-album singles

==== As featured artist ====
Title	Year	Album
as part of Ministarke
"Uno momento" (Severina featuring Ministarke)	2014	Dobrodošao u klub (Live) and Kiseonik
as a solo artist
"Jugoslovenka" (Sunaj featuring Edita)	2019	Non-album singles
"Dobro sam" (Emina featuring Edita)	2020	Non-album singles
"Film o nama" (Cvija featuring Edita)	2021	Non-album singles

==== Promotional singles ====
Title	Year	Album
as part of Ministarke
"Paradox"	2015	Kiseonik
"Mrtav ili živ"	2015	Kiseonik
"Kiseonik"	2015	Kiseonik
"Gram emocija"	2015	Kiseonik
"Boing 747"	2015	Kiseonik
as a solo artist
"Medley"	2021	Non-album singles
"Leto je" (Cover)	2021	Non-album singles
"To je ona žena" (Live)	2023	Non-album singles
"Brat i sestra" (Live)	2026	Non-album singles

=== Guest appearances ===
List of non-single guest appearances, with other performing artists, showing year released and album name
Title	Year	Other artist(s)	Album
"Vidim te"	2025	Zoza	Projekat: Ljubav
"Indica i sativa"	2025	Vekac	U krug
"Suton"	2025	Vekac	U krug
"Bandolero"	2026	Rimski	Naša stvar II (Monte Royal)
"Šaka melanoma"	2026	Matija Vitić	Hotimice

=== Songwriting credits ===
List of songs written or co-written for other artists, showing year released and album name
Title	Year	Artist(s)	Album
"Ljubi me tu"	2020	Marina Visković	Non-album singles
"Penelopa"	2020	Vanja Mijatović	Non-album singles
"Svemir"	2021	Elena	Non-album singles
"Zovi me"	2022	Leonora	Non-album singles
"Skinuli"	2022	Lamia	Non-album singles
"Na tebi je" (featuring Lores)	2025	Džordži	Anomalije
"Talasi"	2025	Lux27	Non-album single

== Filmography ==
List of performances of Edita Aradinović on television
Year	Title	Genre	Role	Notes
2010	Zvezde Granda	Television	Herself (contestant)	Eliminated in the 4th round
2017	Tvoje lice zvuči poznato	Television	Herself (contestant)	4th season; 3rd place
2019	Tvoje lice zvuči poznato	Television	Herself (contestant)	5th season; 4th place
