= Igor Kojić =

Serbian footballer

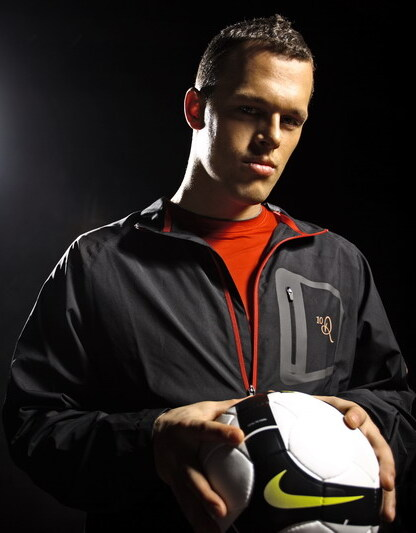
- Kojić in 2009

Personal information
- Full name: Igor Kojić
- Date of birth: 30 July 1987 (age 39)
- Place of birth: Mostar, SR Bosnia and Herzegovina, Yugoslavia
- Height: 1.90 m (6 ft 3 in)
- Position: Goalkeeper

Youth career
- Red Star Belgrade

Senior career*
Years	Team	Apps	(Gls)
2005–2006	Obilić	1	(0)
2006–2007	Bežanija	0	(0)
2007	→ Obilić (loan)	16	(0)
2007–2008	Rad	2	(0)
2008–2009	Hajduk Beograd	25	(0)
2009	Dinamo București	0	(0)
2010	Smederevo	0	(0)
2011	Doxa Katokopias	1	(0)
2011–2012	Santa Clara	0	(0)
2012	Smederevo	0	(0)
Total		45	(0)
- * Club domestic league appearances and goals

Igor Kojić (Serbian Cyrillic: Игор Којић; born 30 July 1987) is a Serbian former footballer who played as a goalkeeper.

== Career ==
In November 2008, while playing for Hajduk Beograd, Kojić gained national attention for his performance in a Serbian Cup game versus Vojvodina. He initially saved one penalty during the regular 90 minutes, before saving three more penalties in the shoot-out and converting the winning one himself to push the club into the quarter-finals of the competition.

In February 2011, Kojić joined Cypriot club Doxa Katokopias, appearing in one league game in the remainder of the season.

In July 2011, Kojić signed a one-year contract with Portuguese club Santa Clara.

== Personal life ==
Kojić is the son of Serbian singer Dragan Kojić Keba. He was married to Croatian singer Severina from 2015 to 2021. In 2025, he was married to the Zagreb native Sofija Dacić for five months.
