= Ja samo pjevam =

Studio album by Severina
- Released: 17 October 1999
- Recorded: May–July 1999
- Studio: Studio Rockoko; J.M. Sound
- Genre: Teen pop; pop rock
- Length: 36:16
- Label: Croatia
- Producer: Ante Pecotić; Nikša Bratoš; Hrvoje Grčević

Severina chronology
Djevojka sa sela (1998)	Ja samo pjevam (1999)	Pogled ispod obrva (2001)

Ja samo pjevam (lit. 'I Just Sing') is the seventh album by Croatian singer Severina. It was released in 1999 by Croatia Records, and sold more than 50,000 copies. In addition to nine original songs, the album also includes a cover of the song "Dodirni mi kolena". Four singles from the album "Da si moj", "Ante", "Ja samo pjevam" and "Dodirni mi koljena" were released. The album was not supported by an indoor tour, but on 6 July 2000, she held a solo concert at the Stadion Stari plac in Split in front of more than 20,000 people.

== Track listing ==
1. "Ante" (Ante)
2. "Ja samo pjevam" (I Just Sing)
3. "Dodirni mi koljena" (Touch My Knees)
4. "Nedostaješ mi" (I Miss You)
5. "Tužna pjesma" (Sad Song)
6. "Da si moj" (If You Were Mine)
7. "Bolna ti bolujem" (Painfully Suffering)
8. "Esmeralda" (Esmeralda)
9. "Daj da biram" (Let Me Choose)
10. "Odavde do vječnosti" (From Here to Eternity)
