= Moja stvar =

Studio album by Severina
- Released: November 5, 1996
- Recorded: August 1996
- Studio: Studio Rockoko
- Length: 44:39
- Label: Croatia
- Producer: Nikša Bratoš

Severina chronology
Trava zelena (1995)	Moja stvar (1996)	Djevojka sa sela (1998)

Moja stvar (My Business) is the fifth album by Croatian singer Severina. It was released in 1996 by Croatia Records. This is Severina's first album on which she is credited as the author of the title track and several other songs.

== Track listing ==
1. "Uspavanka" (Lullaby)
2. "Moja stvar" (My Business)
3. "Od rođendana do rođendana" (From Birthday to Birthday)
4. "Spreman za to" (Ready for It)
5. "Pomalo" (Slowly)
6. "Zima, ljeta, jeseni" (Winters, Summers, Autumns)
7. "Zvijezde padaju" (The Stars Are Falling)
8. "Budi happy" (Be Happy)
9. "Slobodna" (Free)
10. "Aj, aj, aj, aj" (Ow, Ow, Ow, Ow)
11. "Milost" (Amazing Grace)
