= Severina (1992 album) =

Studio album by Severina
- Released: September 8, 1992
- Recorded: April 1992
- Studio: Studio Rockoko
- Genre: Pop rock
- Length: 41:07
- Label: Croatia
- Producer: Zrinko Tutić, Nikša Bratoš

Severina chronology
Severina (1990)	Severina (1992)	Dalmatinka (1993)

Severina is the second album by Croatian singer Severina. It was released in 1992 by Croatia Records. The album marked the beginning of her collaboration with composer Zrinko Tutić.

== Track listing ==
1. "Idemo se ljubiti" (Let's Kiss)
2. "Kad si sam" (When You're Alone)
3. "Budim se s imenom tvojim" (I Wake Up To Your Name)
4. "Kaži dal' je ljubav" (Tell Me Is It Love)
5. "Odlazim" (I'm Leaving)
6. "Zakuni se ljubavi" (Swear, Love)
7. "Tvoja prva djevojka" (Your First Girlfriend)
8. "Zamisli" (Imagine)
9. "Baby, Baby"
10. "Sve što imam, to si ti" (You're All I Have)
