= Dalmatinka =

Studio album by Severina
- Released: August 13, 1993
- Recorded: May 1993
- Studio: Studio Rockoko
- Length: 35:50
- Label: Croatia
- Producer: Zrinko Tutić, Nikša Bratoš

Severina chronology
Severina (1992)	Dalmatinka (1993)	Trava zelena (1995)

Dalmatinka is the third album by Croatian singer Severina. It was released in 1993 by Croatia Records.

== Track listing ==
1. "Dalmatinka" (Dalmatian Girl)
2. "Ljubi me noćas" (Kiss Me Tonight)
3. "Ne bi' ti oprostila" (I Wouldn't Forgive You)
4. "Maria Christina"
5. "Ti si moj" (You're Mine)
6. "Paloma nera" (Black Dove)
7. "Adio ljube" (Goodbye Love)
8. "Ne spavaj mala moja" (Don't Sleep, My Baby)
9. "Mornarica mlada" (Young Navy)
10. "Čovjek kojeg volim" (The Man I Love)
