= Djevojka sa sela =

Studio album by Severina
- Released: February 13, 1998
- Recorded: December 1997
- Studio: J.M. Sound
- Length: 38:20
- Label: Croatia
- Producer: Zrinko Tutić, Nikša Bratoš

Severina chronology
| Moja stvar (1996) | Djevojka sa sela (1998) | Ja samo pjevam (1999) |

Djevojka sa sela (English: Village Girl) is the sixth album by Croatian singer Severina. It was released in 1998 by Croatia Records. Six of the songs were written by Severina.

== Track listing ==
1. "Djevojka sa sela" (Village Girl)
2. "Prijateljice" (Girlfriends)
3. "Rastajem se od života" (I'm Parting With Life)
4. "Meni fali on" (I Miss Him)
5. "Sija sunce, trava miriše" (The Sun Is Shining, the Grass Smells Nice)
6. "Savršena žena" (A Perfect Woman)
7. "Priznajem" (I Admit)
8. "Prevara" (Deceit)
9. "Zaustavite tramvaj" (Stop The Tram)
10. "Marjane moj" (My Marjan)
