= BluVinil =

Croatian band

- Origin: Šibenik, Croatia
- Genres: Rock; pop rock
- Years active: 2017–present
- Labels: Dallas Records; LAA
- Members: Matej Nakić; Bruno Jakelić; Branimir Župić; Ante Lovrić Tancalo
- Past members: Filip Knežević; Luka Načinović; Marko Štimac; Rino Miorin; Matija Maljoku; Marko Jurin
- Website: bluvinil.com

BluVinil is a Croatian rock band composed of four members: Matej Nakić, Bruno Jakelić, Branimir Župić and Ante Lovrić Tancalo. The group signed a joint record deal with Dallas Records, after forming in 2017. In 2020 the band released their breakthrough hit "Apaši". Their debut album Apaši was released in late 2020. In early 2021 the group signed a deal with LAA with whom they have released two studio albums so far. Their latest release is the album Carstvo Meditarana from 2025.

== Career ==
=== 2017–2022: Apaši and Zna li itko tajnu srca? ===
Their debut single "Mili brat" was released in April 2017. Prior to the release of the song BluVinil was officially signed by the record label Dallas Records. Throughout 2018 and 2019 the band released four more singles, "Julija", "Helena", "Moderna" and "Sigurna u nas", respectively. The band's debut studio album Apaši was released on 3 October 2020. The album's lead single of the same name became their first song to chart on the Croatian HR Top 40 chart. On 23 December 2020, BluVinil received nominations in the categories Best New Artist and Song of the Year for the third edition of the Rock&Off Awards. In May 2021, it was announced that the band had left Dallas Records and signed a contract with the record label LAA. In 2021, two singles, "Heroji" and "U predgrađu", from the band's second studio album Zna li itko tajnu srca? were released. On 25 May 2022, the album's third single "Zasjeda" was released. Zna li itko tajnu srca? was ultimately released on 11 November 2023 on various formats through LAA. The album release was accompanied by the release of its fourth single "Boris B". BluVinil embarked on a little promo concert tour throughout Croatia in December 2022 to further promote the album. Based on the album's performance the band earned a nomination at the fifth annual Rock&Off Awards in the category "Best Pop Artist".

=== 2023–present: Third studio album ===
On 17 November 2023, the group unveiled their single, "Ovdje nema nikoga", serving as a precursor to their third studio album. In mid-2024 the band released another single called "Zvijeri" which was the most searched Croatian song on Shazam for a few weeks after its release. After more than a year of recording hiatus, the band released the double album "Carstvo Mediterana" at midnight on October 17, 2025 without any announcement. The album contains 20 new songs, including the previously released single "Zvijeri". The single "Ovdje nema nikoga" ended up not being included on this album. The album's release was accompanied by the single of the same name "Carstvo Mediterana". The band stated the following about the album: "Carstvo Mediterana it brings a twist to Mediterranean rock and gathers songs woven with the sounds, images, tastes and smells of Dalmatia. The album's theme deals with growing up in Dalmatia and nostalgia for a much calmer time, away from the speed and shallowness of today's fast online world." The album achieved considerable success from the very beginning, with more than a hundred thousand streams on streaming platforms in the first two weeks.

The band will promote the album with a concert at the Boogaloo Club in Zagreb on February 7, 2026.

== Musical style ==
BluVinil is mainly a pop rock band. Their music has been described as having a "retro feel" to it as well. The group lists the Beatles, David Bowie, Leonard Cohen, Bob Dylan and Tom Waits as their main influences.

== Discography ==
=== Studio albums ===
Title	Details
Apaši	Released: 3 October 2020; Label: Dallas Records; Formats: Digital download, streaming
Zna li itko tajnu srca?	Released: 11 November 2022; Label: LAA; Formats: LP, CD, digital download, streaming
Carstvo Mediterana	Released: 17 October 2025; Label: LAA; Formats: Digital download, streaming

=== Singles ===
Title	Year	Peak chart positions	Album
Title	Year	CRO	Album
"Mili brat"	2017	—	Non-album single
"Helena"	2018	—	Non-album single
"Julija"	2018	—	Apaši
"Moderna"	2019	—	Apaši
"Sigurna u nas"	2019	—	Apaši
"Komarac"	2020	—	Apaši
"Apaši"	2020	26	Apaši
"Ova pjesma"	2021	— (Note: "Ova pjesma" did not enter the HR Top 40, but peaked at number 41 on the regional HR Top 100 (Dalmacija) chart.)	Apaši
"Heroji"	2021	— (Note: "Heroji" did not enter the HR Top 40, but peaked at number 14 on the regional HR Top 100 (Dalmacija) chart.)	Zna li itko tajnu srca?
"U predgrađu"	2021	28	Zna li itko tajnu srca?
"Zasjeda"	2022	— (Note: "Zasjeda" did not enter the HR Top 40, but peaked at number 12 on the regional HR Top 100 (Dalmacija) chart.)	Zna li itko tajnu srca?
"Boris B"	2022	— (Note: "Boris B" did not enter the HR Top 40, but peaked at number 9 on the regional HR Top 100 (Dalmacija) chart.)	Zna li itko tajnu srca?
"Ovdje nema nikoga"	2023	—	Non-album single
"Zvijeri"	2024	__	Carstvo Mediterana
"Carstvo Mediterana"	2025	75	Carstvo Mediterana
"—" denotes releases that did not chart or were not released in that territory.

== Awards and nominations ==
Year	Association	Category	Nominee / work	Result	Ref.
2021	Rock&Off Awards	Best New Artist	BluVinil	Nominated	
2021	Rock&Off Awards	Song of the Year	"Apaši"	Nominated	
2023	Rock&Off Awards	Best Pop Artist	BluVinil	Nominated	
