= Grad bez ljudi =

Single by Severina

from the album Dobrodošao u klub
- Released: February 14, 2012
- Length: 4:17
- Label: Dallas; City; Music Star Production
- Songwriters: Filip Miletić; Miloš Roganović
- Producer: Dušan Alagić

Severina singles chronology
"Brad Pitt" (2011)	"Grad bez ljudi" (2012)	"Italiana" (2012)

Grad bez ljudi (English: City without people) is a song by Croatian recording artist Severina.

== Track list ==
=== Croatian promo single ===
No.	Title	Length
1.	"Grad bez ljudi"	4:17
2.	"Šta me sad pitaš šta mi je (from Tridesete uživo)"	5:06
3.	"Mili moj (from Tridesete uživo)"	7:27
4.	"Pogled ispod obrva (from Tridesete uživo)"	4:56
5.	"Gade (from Tridesete uživo)"	4:01
6.	"Tridesete (from Tridesete uživo)"	5:47
7.	"Ja samo pjevam (from Tridesete uživo)"	4:45
Total length:		36:19

=== Serbian maxi single ===
No.	Title	Length
1.	"Grad bez ljudi"	4:17
2.	"Brad Pitt"	4:12
3.	"Gade"	3:41
4.	"Tridesete"	4:02
5.	"Gas gas"	3:37
Total length:		19:52
