= Trava zelena =

Studio album by Severina
- Released: July 9, 1995
- Recorded: April – June 1995
- Studio: Studio Rockoko
- Length: 42:14
- Label: Croatia
- Producer: Zrinko Tutić; Nikša Bratoš; Miro Buljan; Vedran Ostojić

Severina chronology
Dalmatinka (1993)	Trava zelena (1995)	Moja stvar (1996)

Trava zelena (English: Green Grass) is the fourth album by Croatian singer Severina. It was released in 1995 by Croatia Records. The producers of the album are Zrinko Tutić, Nikša Bratoš, Miro Buljan and Vedran Ostojić. Other collaborators are Faruk Buljubašić, Nenad Ninčević, Rajko Dujmić, and for the first time Severina herself is credited as a writer of three songs on the album.

== Track listing ==
1. "Trava zelena" (Green Grass)
2. "Vatra i led" (Fire and Ice)
3. "Ti si srce moje" (You Are My Heart)
4. "Mr. Taliman" (Mr. Tally Man)
5. "Bože moj" (My God)
6. "Bambola" (Doll)
7. "Lude godine" (Crazy Years)
8. "Poželi me" (Want Me)
9. "Pruži mi ruke" (Give Me Your Hands)
10. "Ludo moja" (My Fool)
