= Pogled ispod obrva =

Studio album by Severina
- Released: May 15, 2001
- Studio: Studio Rockoko
- Genre: Pop rock, adult contemporary
- Length: 49:26
- Label: Croatia
- Producer: Nikša Bratoš, Ante Pecotić, Mustafa Softić

Severina chronology
Ja samo pjevam (1999)	Pogled ispod obrva (2001)	Severgreen (2004)

Pogled ispod obrva (English: The Look Beneath The Eyebrows) is the eighth album by Croatian singer Severina. It was released in 2001 by Croatia Records.

Some reviewers see the album as Severina's best, in which she flirts with folk music in an open and highly effective way. Severina herself openly stated that the strongest influence for the album and her greatest support came from her musical guru Siniša Vuco.

The album is one of Severina's best selling albums, having sold in more than 30,000 units, and it's considered one of the best selling albums in Croatia.

== Track listing ==
1. "Tako je to" (It's Like That)
2. "Mala je dala" (The Chick Gave In)
3. "Noću, danju" (At Night, During The Day)
4. "Mili moj" (My Dear)
5. "Voli me, ne voli" (He Loves Me, He Loves Me Not)
6. "Pogled ispod obrva" (The Look Beneath The Eyebrows)
7. "Krivi spoj" (Wrong Connection)
8. "Parfem" (Perfume)
9. "Srce je moje veliko k'o kuća" (My Heart Is As Big As A House)
10. "Idi" (Go)
11. "More na leđa" (The Sea Upside Down)
12. "Ajde, ajde zlato moje" (Come On, Come On My Darling)
13. "Virujen u te" (I Believe in You)
