= Severgreen =

Studio album by Severina
- Released: 4 October 2004
- Recorded: January–June 2004
- Genre: Folk, turbo folk, pop, adult contemporary
- Length: 36:11
- Label: Dallas

Severina chronology
Pogled ispod obrva (2001)	Severgreen (2004)	Moja štikla / Moj sokole (2006)

Singles from Severgreen
- 1. "Bojate bane buski" Released: 23 August 2004; 2. "Adam i Seva" Released: 2 February 2005

Severgreen is the ninth studio album by Croatian singer Severina. It was released on 4 October 2004 by Dallas Records. The album was released in a number of different colored "boxes", blue, orange, pink, purple, or yellow, each with a different photograph of Severina.

== Track listing ==
1. "Adam i Seva" (Adam and Seve)
2. "Broš" (Brooch)
3. "Hrvatica" (Croat Woman)
4. "Niti s' tobom, nit' bez tebe" (Neither with You nor Without You)
5. "Sama na sceni" (Alone on the Stage)
6. "Bojate bane buski"
7. "Ma daj" (Oh, Come On)
8. "Tuge od sna" (Sorrows from a Dream)
9. "Iz glave" (From My Head)
10. "Šta me sad pitaš šta mi je" (Why Do You Ask Me What's Wrong Now?)
