= Dobrodošao u klub =

Studio album by Severina
- Released: 14 December 2012
- Recorded: 2011–2012
- Genre: Pop, folk-pop
- Length: 46:05
- Label: Dallas Records
- Producer: Nikša Bratoš, Branimir Mihaljević, Filip Miletić, Miloš Rogaović, Dušan Alagić

Severina chronology
Tridesete uživo (2010)	Dobrodošao u klub (2012)	50 originalnih pjesama (2013)

Dobrodošao u klub (lit. 'Welcome to the Club') is the eleventh studio album by Croatian recording artist Severina, which was released in December 2012 by Dallas Records. The Dobrodošao u Klub Tour stands out as the successful tour. Songs from the album have collected more than 260 million views on the YouTube.

== Track listing ==
Dobrodošao u klub track listing
No.	Title	Lyrics	Music	Arrangement	Length
1.	"Dobrodošao u klub"	Miloš Roganović	Roganović	Filip Miletić; Roganović; Dušan Alagić
2.	"Ko me tjero"	Severina Vučković; Miletić; Roganović	Miletić; Roganović	Miletić; Roganović; Alagić
3.	"Uzbuna"	Miletić; Roganović	Miletić; Roganović	Miletić; Roganović
4.	"Italiana" (featuring FM)	Miletić; Roganović	Miletić; Roganović	Miletić; Roganović
5.	"Kradeš sve"	Roganović	Roganović	Miletić; Roganović; Alagić
6.	"Slaba na slabića"	Fahrudin Pecikoza	Hari Varešanović	Nikša Bratoš
7.	"Kamen oko vrata"	Roganović	Roganović	Miletić; Roganović; Alagić
8.	"Grad bez ljudi"	Miletić; Roganović	Miletić; Roganović	Miletić; Roganović; Alagić
9.	"Ostavljena"	Vučković	Vučković	Miletić; Roganović
10.	"Brad Pitt"	Miletić; Roganović	Miletić; Roganović	Miletić; Roganović; Alagić
11.	"Postelja od vina" (featuring DJ-XL)	Faruk "Fayo" Buljubašić; Branimir Mihaljević	Mihaljević	David Vurdelja
12.	"Tarapana"	Dušan Bačić	Bačić	Bojan Dragojević
13.	"Tango" (with Željko Bebek)	Buljubašić	Mihaljević	Mihaljević

Notes

- "Dobrodošao u klub" features uncredited vocal contribution from Bojana Stamenov.
- "Tarapana" features uncredited vocal contribution from Dušan Bačić.
