= Tridesete =

Single by Severina

from the album Zdravo Marijo
- Released: 16 December 2008
- Recorded: 2008
- Genre: Pop; folk
- Length: 4:02
- Label: Dallas Records; PGP-RTS
- Composer: Sezen Aksu
- Lyricists: Marina Tucaković; Ljiljana Jorgovanović; Goran Bregović
- Producer: Goran Bregović

Severina singles chronology
"Gas, gas" (2008)	"Tridesete" (2008)	"Zdravo Marijo" (2009)

Music video
- "Tridesete" on YouTube

"Tridesete" (Croatian for 'Thirties') is a song by Croatian singer Severina from her tenth studio album, Zdravo Marijo (2008). A cover of Sibel Tüzün's "Kaçın Kurası" (1995), the lyrics were adapted into Croatian by Marina Tucaković, Ljiljana Jorgovanović, and the song's producer Goran Bregović. Released as the album's second single, the track received major release in December 2008.

== Single release ==
The song received major radio air-play and is one of Severina's most successful songs in years.

== Critical reception ==
The critical response to "Tridesete" was overwhelmingly positive. The critics praised Severina's edgy vocals as well as the lyrics, music and style.

== Music video ==
The video was released at the same time as the single, and the public panned it because of the resemblance to the Britney Spears' video for the track "Circus". 86% of the Croatian, Serbian and Bosnian critics loved the video, and a few of them actually said that "It doesn't make any resemblance to the Britney Spears video" and that "Severina is by far one of the best artists in former Yugoslavia".

== Official versions ==
- "Tridesete" (Main Version)
- "Tridesete" (Instrumental)
- "Tridesete" (Acapella)
- "Tridesete" (Electro Mix)
- "Tridesete" (Live Version)
