= La Lana =

Croatian pop singer

- Lana Jurčević
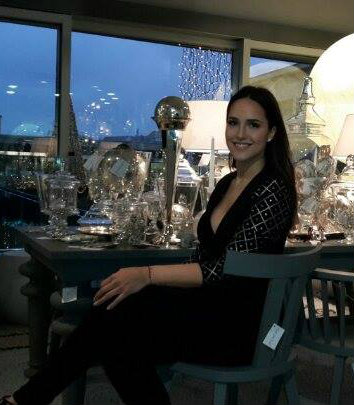
- La Lana in 2015
- Born: Lana Jurčević; 7 November 1984 (age 41); Zagreb, SR Croatia, SFR Yugoslavia
- Education: University of Zagreb
- Occupations: Singer; businesswoman
- Years active: 2003–present
- Partner: Filip Kratofil (2017-present)
- Children: 2
- Parents: Damir Jurčević; Esma Karaselimović
- Musical career
- Genres: Pop; Pop-folk
- Labels: Croatia Records; Hit Records; Menart Records; Warner Music Group
- Website: www.lalanamusic.com

Lana Jurčević (Croatian pronunciation: [lǎːna jǔːrtʃeʋitɕ]; born 7 November 1984), internationally better known as La Lana (pronounced /ləˈlɑːnə/), is a Croatian pop singer. Her self-titled debut album was released in 2003, with all of the songs on the album written by Milana Vlaović. In her early career she had already worked with big names of the Croatian music industry, such as Vlaović, Nikša Bratoš, Ante Pecotić, Muc Softić, Luka Nižetić and Severina. Alongside her musical career, she also holds a degree in journalism.

In the span of fifteen years, she has released five studio albums. In January 2020, she began her international music career, releasing her debut international single "So Messed Up" for Warner Music under the stage name La Lana.

== Early life ==
Lana was born on November 7, 1984, in Zagreb, Yugoslavia (today Croatia) to a Croatian father from Imotski, Damir, and a Bosniak mother, Esma (née Karaselimović). At an early age, she had a passion for singing, and thought she would eventually become a singer.

== Career ==
=== Early career: Teen idol image ===
In 2003 at the beginning of her musical career, Jurčević released her self-titled debut album Lana for Croatia Records. It spawned hit singles such as "Odlaziš" (You're Leaving), "Otkad te nema" (Ever Since You're Gone), "Najbolja glumica" (The Best Actress), "Ovo nije istina" (This Is Not True), and "Pravi razlog" (Real Reason) and a duet with Croatian singer Severina "Rođena da budem prva" (Born to be first). In 2004, she performed "Odlaziš" at the Croatian Radio Festival. She has also taken part in Dora 2004, Croatian national pre-selection for Eurovision Song Contest, with the song "Prava istina" (Real Truth), finishing sixth in the final. In 2005, her song "Ovo nije istina" won 24sata's award for most interesting performance at the Croatian Radio Festival. In 2006, Jurčević released her sophomore album, 1 razlog, released by Hit Records. The same year she performed a duet with Luka Nižetić titled "Prava ljubav" (Real Love) at the Croatian Radio Festival, which was a major commercial success and is one of Jurčević's signature songs to date. In 2007, she represented Croatia at the OGAE Song Contest with "1 razlog" (1 Reason). She competed again at Dora in 2006 with the song "Najbolja glumica". Lana performed "Ljubav nije greška" (Love Is Not a Mistake) at Sunčane Skale, and finished twelfth. On 15 April 2007, she starred in the TV show Nad lipom 35, playing herself. She took part in Ples za zvijezdama, the Croatian version of Dancing with the Stars and finished second.

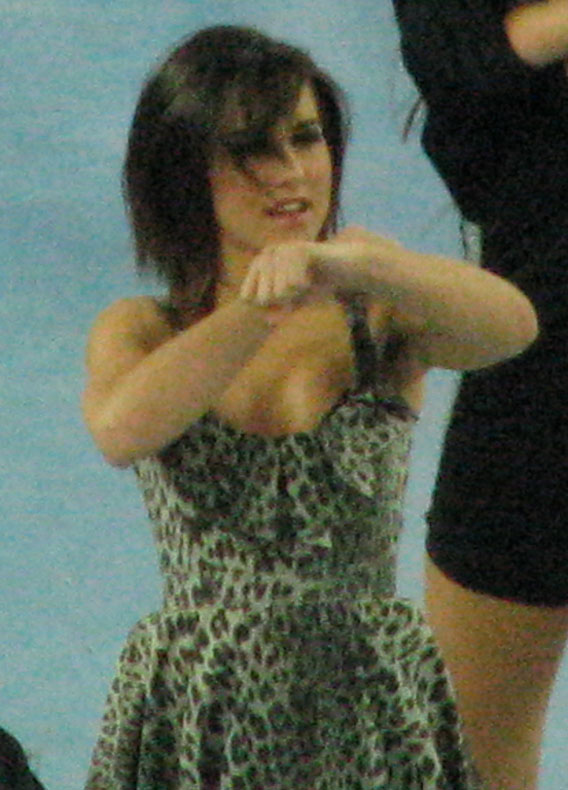
Lana Jurčević in 2008

Later, in 2008, she released a number of singles, such as "Pronađi me" (Find Me), "Marija" (Mary) and "Miljama daleko" (Miles Away). Soon after she released her third album Volim biti zaljubljena. At the 2008 Croatian Radio Festival, she performed "Zora bijela" (White Dawn). A year later, she performed the song "Začaran" (Enchanted). The same year she covered a traditional Croatian Christmas carol "Djetešce nam se rodilo" (A Child Was Born Unto Us).

=== 2010–2019: The change of image ===
In March 2010, she released the single "Kopija" (Copy), which served as the lead single for her compilation album of the same name. In May 2011, she visited Belgrade and appeared in a number of shows in Serbia, Macedonia and Slovenia, performing the last single off Kopija, "Ubile usne moje" (My Lips Have Killed). In 2012, she released her fourth album Pobjede i porazi, which was characterized by more mature sound than her previous studio efforts. The following year she performed the song "La la land" off the album at the CMC Festival in Vodice. She concluded the year with a collaboration with Croatian hip-hop group Connect, titled "Noć bez granica" (Night Without Limits).

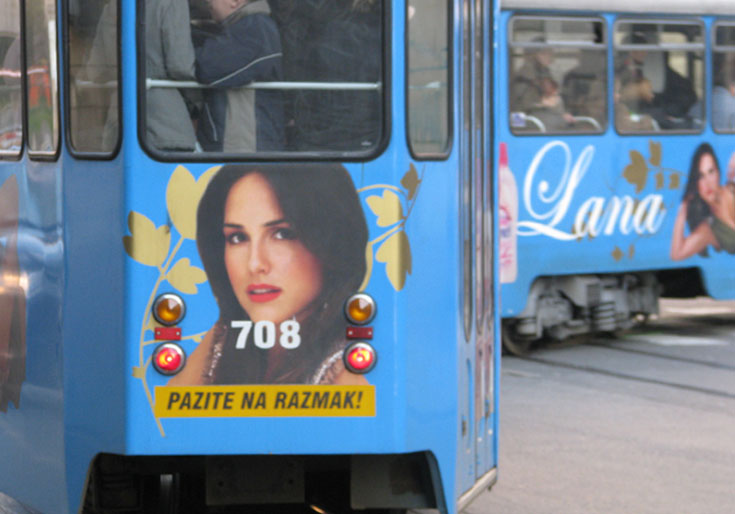
Lana on Zagreb tram

Throughout 2014 she released a number of singles such as "Duša hrvatska" (Croatian Soul), the revenue of which was donated to the victims of 2014 Southeast Europe floods as part of the humanitarian action organized by HDS ZAMP, "Majica" (T-shirt) and "Hollywood". The following year she released "Od najgorih najbolji" (The Best of the Worst), the second duet with Luka Nižetić following 2006's "Prava ljubav". In the summer she dropped "Ludo ljeto" (Crazy Summer). The song received positive reviews from critics and it was performed at the CMC Festival in Vodice and X Factor Adria.

In 2016 she took part in Tvoje lice zvuči poznato, Croatian version of Your Face Sounds Familiar, finishing third. In 2017 Jurčević released her fifth album Tabu, which received positive reviews. It was preceded by singles "Kim Kardashian", "Daj da plovimo" (Let's Sail) as well as the title track (Taboo). She released two singles in 2018, "Usne od milijun watti" (Million Watt Lips) and "Upalimo ljubav" (Let's Turn On Love) with Luka Basi, before taking a hiatus.

=== 2020–present: International career ===
Jurčević ended the hiatus in January 2020, deleting all posts off her Instagram account and announcing that she had signed a contract with Warner Music. The same month she released her debut international single "So Messed Up" under a new stage name La Lana.

== Personal life ==
=== Business ===
She completed senior year of journalism at University of Zagreb. In September 2010, she opened her own dance studio in Zagreb, LA Studio. In June 2018, she founded her own natural cosmetics and skincare brand La Piel.

=== Relationships ===
In early 2000s, Jurčević was dating Ivan Todorić, son of Croatian business mogul Ivica Todorić. They were together for 7 years, until 2007. In 2009, Jurčević was dating Fabijan Marić until 2011, when they broke up. She has been in a relationship with the CEO of her company Filip Kratofil since 2017, and in December 2023 they welcomed their first child Mayla Lily.

== Discography ==
=== Albums ===
- Lana (2003)
- 1 razlog (2006)
- Volim biti zaljubljena (2008)
- Pobjede i porazi (2012)
- Tabu (2017)

=== Compilation albums ===
- Kopija (2010)
