= Milana Vlaović =

Croatian journalist and songwriter

Milana Vlaović (née Bebić; born 1971 in Metković) is a Croatian journalist, composer, writer and columnist.

== Journalistic career ==
She had finished her elementary school as well as high school in Metković, and as she turned 18, she started to study at the Faculty of Law in Zagreb. While she was studying, she worked as a part-time associate on Croatian Radiotelevision and conducted interviews with people from public life for magazine Pop Extra and contribution TV Best in Globus magazine.

Due to her then-husband Goran's football career, she is moving to Padua for two years, then she lived in Valencia the next four years, and later she has moved to Athens for four years. In 2004, she returned to Zagreb and continued her composing, literary, and journalistic career by writing columns for different Croatian daily newspapers, such as Jutarnji list, and weekly newspapers.

In 2004, she graduated journalism on Faculty of Political Science in Zagreb. For many years, she was writing columns for lifestyle magazine Storybook in which she conducted broad, biographic interviews with well-known people from the world of theater, film, music and television.

In 2015, she finished a four-year long education from an integrative psychotherapy.

== Music career ==
Since she came back to Zagreb, she started to collaborate with various Croatian musicians. Already in 1990, she performed in a backup band with Tajči at the Eurovision Song Contest 1990 in Zagreb with the song "Hajde da ludujemo". Representing what was then Yugoslavia, they won seventh place in the competition.

When she was 25, she began writing lyrics and music for pop songs, and in 2002, her song "Sasvim sigurna", performed by Vesna Pisarović, won the Croatian music competition Dora, and represented Croatia at the Eurovision Song Contest 2002 where it won eleventh place.

She wrote music and lyrics for six studio albums by Vesna Pisarović and Lana Jurčević, which won numerous gold and silver awards.

Her songs have been awarded at numerous music festivals, such as Melodije hrvatskog Jadrana, Zlatne žice Slavonije, Dora, while her song "Prava ljubav", which was performed by Lana Jurčević and Luka Nižetić, won the Croatian award "Hit of the year" in 2006.

She is the member of Croatian Composers Society.

== Writing career ==
Until now, she has published four prose works:

- Blato, V.B.Z., 2007.
- Bomboni od meda, Naklada Ljevak, 2011.
- Rašeljka i druge žene, EPH, 2013.
- Glad, HENA COM, 2016.

In 2013, in collaboration with Podravka and EPH, she published her book Priče o nedjeljnom kolaču.

She is the member of Croatian Writers Society.
