= Luka Basi =

- Birth name: Matej Prikeržnik
- Also known as: Luka Basi
- Born: 8.October 1993; Slovenj Gradec, Slovenia
- Genres: Pop, Party Pop
- Occupation: Singer
- Instrument(s): Vocals, guitar
- Years active: 2015–present
- Labels: Croatia Records, Menart Records

Luka Basi, is a Slovenian singer and songwriter . He is chiefly known for his main hit songs: Istrijanko ružo moja, Meta, Taxi, Sedam Noći, Seko Moja, and Kad vidin boga uživo, as well as his collaborations with Joško Čagalj - Jole, Lidija Bačić, Lana Jurčević, Marko Škugor, and Ljubavnici.

His first album went on sale in 2019.

== Discography ==
=== Studio albums ===
Title	Details	Peak chart positions
Title	Details	CRO
Luka Basi	Released: 5 July 2019; Formats: Digital download, CD; Label: Croatia Records	—

=== Singles ===
Title	Year	Peak chart positions		Album
Title	Year	CRO	SLO	Album
"Nisam ja od jučer" (with Jole)	2016	32	—	Luka Basi
"Kombinacija"	2017	—	—	Luka Basi
"Solo" (with Lidija Bačić)	2017	19	—	Luka Basi
"Moja" (with Ljubavnici)	2017	16	—	Luka Basi
"White Christmas (Bel Božič)" (with Maraaya & Friends)	2017	—	31	Non-album single
"Seko moja"	2018	—	—	Luka Basi
"Upalimo ljubav" (with Lana Jurčević)	2018	13	—	Luka Basi
"Istrijanko ružo moja"	2018	—	—	Luka Basi
"U bijelom"	2018	36	—	Luka Basi
"Sedam noći"	2019	9	—	Luka Basi
"Ružo bila" (with Marko Škugor)	2019	7	—	Luka Basi
"Kad vidin Boga uživo"	2019	—	—	Luka Basi
"Meta"	2019	—	—	Luka Basi
"Taxi"	2019	4	—	Non-album single
Prokleto zlato	2020			Non-album single
"Ljubav mog života"	2021	23	—	
"—" denotes a single that did not chart or was not released.
