= Moja štikla =

2006 song by Severina

Single by Severina

from the EP Moja štikla / Moj sokole
- Language: Croatian
- Released: 1 January 2006
- Length: 2:58
- Label: Dallas
- Composers: Boris Novković; Franjo Valentić
- Lyricist: Severina

Music video
- "Moja štikla" on YouTube

Eurovision Song Contest 2006 entry
- Country: Croatia

Finals performance
- Final result: 12th
- Final points: 56

Entry chronology
- ◄ "Vukovi umiru sami" (2005)
- "Vjerujem u ljubav" (2007) ►

Official performance video
- "Moja štikla" on YouTube

"Moja štikla" (Croatian pronunciation: [mǒja ʃtǐkla], transl. "My High Heel") was the Croatian entry in the Eurovision Song Contest 2006, performed in Croatian by Severina. The song was chosen to represent Croatia after winning Dora 2006, Croatia's national final.

== Background ==
Before Dora 2006, Boris Novković presented "Moja štikla" to Severina, who subsequently forwarded the composition to Goran Bregović with the suggestion of incorporating šijavica. Bregović subsequently arranged the song, while Severina wrote the lyrics during the recording sessions. The arrangement featured traditional instruments, including the diple and gajde, performed by Stjepan Večković of Ansambl Lado. At Bregović's suggestion, the production incorporated traditional folk singers instead of conventional backing vocalists. Ganga singers from Dicmo and the Matić brothers from Čavoglave were invited to perform šijavica vocals. During the recording sessions, the singers performed a traditional-style sequence of improvised rhythmic phrases, including the expressions "zumba zumba", "sijeno slama", "sir salama", and "Afrika paprika", which Severina decided to incorporate into the final version of the song. Ansambl Lado accompanied Severina during her performances at both Dora 2006 and the Eurovision Song Contest in Athens.

== Composition ==
The song itself was described in commentary as being in the turbo-folk style, with Severina singing about various chat-up attempts from local men, as well as entering into folk-influenced call-and-response lyrics with her backing singers.

== Eurovision Song Contest ==
=== Dora 2006 ===
Dora 2006 was the fourteenth edition of the Croatian national selection Dora which selected Croatia's entry for the Eurovision Song Contest 2006. The competition consisted of two semi-finals on 2 and 3 March 2006 and a final on 4 March 2006, all taking place at the Hotel Kvarner in Opatija and broadcast on HTV 1. Dora 2006 consisted of three shows: two semi-finals on 2 and 3 March 2006 and a final on 4 March 2006. Sixteen songs competed in each semi-final and eight proceeded to the final to complete the sixteen-song lineup in the final. The results of all shows were determined by a 50/50 combination of votes from a jury panel and a public televote. HRT directly invited thirty-two artists and composers to participate in the competition. It announced the competing entries on 10 February 2006.

"Moja štikla" was performed in the second semi-final, performing as the last song of the semi-final. The song qualified from the final, earning a combined 30 points for second place in the semi-final. The final took place on 4 March 2006, with the sixteen qualifiers from the preceding two semi-finals competing. The winner was determined by a 50/50 combination of votes from a five-member jury panel and a public televote. Ties were decided in favour of the entry ranked higher by the jury. "Moja štikla" would win the final by two points over Kraljevi ulice's song "Kao san", with "Moja štikla" earning 30 points. As a result, the song was selected to represent Croatia in the Eurovision Song Contest 2006.

=== At Eurovision ===
Despite Croatia's previous entry, "Vukovi umiru sami", having finished eleventh, Croatia was the beneficiary of the controversy surrounding the national final of Serbia and Montenegro, in which No Name was forced to withdraw from the contest. Therefore, Croatia would take over Serbia and Montenegro's spot as an automatic qualifier.

The song was performed twentieth on the night, following France's Virginie Pouchain with "Il était temps" and preceding Brian Kennedy of Ireland with "Every Song Is a Cry for Love". At the close of voting, it had received 56 points, placing equal 12 in a field of 24 and returning Croatia to the semi-final for the Eurovision Song Contest 2007.

The performance featured the combination of traditionally-dressed Balkan folk musicians and Severina herself in a red dress. The dress was partially removed, in a move made famous by Bucks Fizz in their performance of "Making Your Mind Up") during the performance. It was succeeded as Croatian representative at the 2007 contest by Dragonfly featuring Dado Topić with "Vjerujem u ljubav". The song was part of her 2006 EP, Moja štikla / Moj sokole.

== Parodies ==
Its controversy and performance inspired a wide range of parodies, with the most notable one being "U govno je stala moja štikla (Turbo folk štikla)" produced by Croatian comic artist Stevo Sinik. Said video mocks the song, drawing the parallel that it has many elements of turbo folk, which does not represent the country. The parody's satirical lyrics and rustic style have contributed to the popularity of the song, and it became one of the most popular parodies in Croatia in 2006.

== Charts ==
Chart (2006)	Peak position
Croatian Top 20 Chart	6
