= Đorđe Novković =

- Born: 2 September 1943 Vladimirci, German-occupied Serbia
- Died: 6 May 2007 (aged 63) Zagreb, Croatia
- Genres: Pop
- Occupation: Songwriter
- Years active: 1967–2007
- Formerly of: Pro Arte; Indexi

Đorđe Novković (2 September 1943 - 6 May 2007) was a Croatian songwriter who was known for his work in Yugoslavia and Croatia. Novković composed more than 2,500 songs and sold approximately 20 million records. He is also known as the father of popular Croatian singer Boris Novković.

== Biography ==
Novković was born to a Serb father Vukašin and a Croat mother Danica during World War II in the village of Vladimirci on the German-occupied territory of what only a few years earlier used to be Kingdom of Yugoslavia's Drina Banovina.

He moved to Sarajevo at an early age, so his musical talent was discovered very early, and he joined the musical school in Sarajevo at the age of 6. After graduating conducting from Musical Academy in Sarajevo, he founded a band Pro Arte during the fall of 1967.

In 1968, Đorđe's wife Ozana gave birth to their son Boris, and the family moved to Zagreb. Boris later became a rock singer-songwriter, but he split abruptly with his father at the age of 19. Đorđe's first hit came in 1969 with the song "Više se nećeš vratiti" (You Will Not Return) performed by Mišo Kovač and sold in half a million copies, and a later version in 1985 had similar success. In 1973, Pro Arte merged with another Sarajevo pop group Indexi, but the experiment lasted only several months. Pro Arte existed in continuity until 1980, as well as off-and-on throughout the 1980s. In 1989 Novković moved to live in Rovinj, Croatia.

After Pro Arte, Đorđe Novković switched to writing songs, creating material for some of the hits of the former Yugoslavia. He collaborated with performers such as Mišo Kovač, Neda Ukraden, Zdravko Čolić, Tomislav Ivčić, Tereza Kesovija, Ivica Šerfezi, Gabi Novak, Srebrna krila, Žanamari Lalić and others.

After the death of President of Yugoslavia Josip Broz Tito, he composed the music for the song "Druže Tito mi ti se kunemo" (Comrade Tito, We Swear to You), which was then performed by Zdravko Čolić which was then sold in 350,000 copies. Novković composed music for Sanja Trumbić's famous thank-you schlager "Danke Deutschland" produced in January 1992 by Hrvatska radiotelevizija as a show of gratitude to Germany for their role in international recognition of Croatia's independence. In 1993, he wrote the song "Don't Ever Cry" for Put, the first Croatian representative in the Eurovision Song Contest.

Since 1997, he co-owned and managed the Croatia Records label, together with Miroslav Škoro. In 2000, he moved to Zagreb again. In 2003, Novković gained a lot of popularity as judge of Story Supernova Music Talents, a reality show for aspiring musicians similar to Popstars aired on Nova TV.

== Death ==
He died suddenly at the age of 63, from an apparent stroke, in Zagreb. In a funeral ceremony he was buried in Zagreb's Mirogoj Cemetery.
