= Boris Novković =

Croatian singer-songwriter

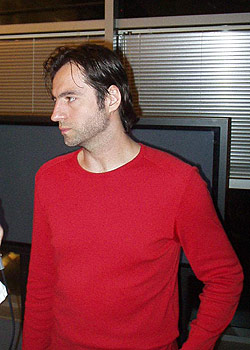
- Novković in 2004

Background information
- Born: 25 December 1967 (age 58); Sarajevo, SR Bosnia and Herzegovina, Yugoslavia
- Origin: Zagreb, Croatia
- Genres: Pop rock
- Occupation: Singer-songwriter
- Instruments: Vocals; guitar
- Years active: 1986–present
- Label: Hayat Production
- Website: www.borisnovkovic-official.com

Boris Novković (born 25 December 1967) is a Croatian singer-songwriter. He has been active since the 1980s.

== Biography ==
Novković was born in Sarajevo, SR Bosnia and Herzegovina, SFR Yugoslavia. His interest in a musical career was cultivated by his family background, with mother Ozana who taught music, and father Đorđe who was a leading Croatian songwriter and music manager. He released his first album, Kuda idu izgubljene djevojke in 1986, selling 120,000 copies, while his follow-up release in 1987, Jači od sudbine, sold 160,000 copies and remained his highest-selling album to date. Two more successful albums followed: Dok svira radio in 1988 and Obojeni snovi in 1989.

In 1990, he narrowly missed out on the chance to represent Yugoslavia at the Eurovision Song Contest with the song "Dajana", but his second-place finish in the national pre-selection instead secured him a place at the International festival in Kuala Lumpur. Seven more albums followed up to 2003, as well as two "best of" compilations, but only a few songs were able to match the popularity of the early ones.

In 2005, fifteen years after his near miss in the Yugoslav pre-selection, Novković won the right to represent the now independent Croatia at the Eurovision Song Contest. He performed his song "Vukovi umiru sami" ("Wolves die alone") together with members of the Lado ensemble. To win the Dora pre-selection competition on 5 March 2005, they had to defeat an array of former Croatian Eurovision representatives, including Magazin, Danijela Martinović, Vesna Pisarović and Goran Karan.

Despite the respectable showing of Croatia's 2004 Eurovision entry "You Are The Only One", the country did not achieve a high enough placing to qualify automatically for the 2005 grand final. Thus Boris' song was performed in the semi-final, where it finished 4th with 169 points, qualifying for the final. Novković represented the country in the Eurovision Song Contest 2005 in Kyiv and finished 11th with 115 points. He was also the composer of "Moja štikla", Croatian entry in the Eurovision Song Contest 2006, performed by Severina.

He later recorded two albums, one in Croatian and one in English, distributed on a label associated with Croatian faith healer Braco.

== Discography ==
=== Albums ===
Studio albums

- Kuda idu izgubljene djevojke... (1986)
- Jači od sudbine (1987)
- Dok svira radio (1988)
- Obojeni snovi (1989)
- 100 X (1991)
- Struji struja (1993)
- U dobru i zlu (1995)
- Sve gubi sjaj bez ljubavi (1997)
- Branim se (1999)
- Direkt (2000)
- 'Ko je kriv (2002)
- Ostvaren san (2004)
- Braco hvala ti (2007)
- Zapisan u tebi (2008)
- Via ljubav (2011)
- Još sam uvijek tvoj (2014)
- Gori ulica (2021)
- Zbog nas (2025)

Live albums

- Live Ostvaren san (2005)
- Mojih prvih 20 Live (2007)

Compilation albums

- The Best of Boris (1995)
- The Best of 1995–2003 (2003)
- Zlatna kolekcija (2005)
- The Platinum Collection (2008)
- Najljepše ljubavne pjesme (2010)
- The Best Of Collection (2015)
- 25 Greatest Hits (2024)

=== Singles ===
Title	Year	Peak chart positions	Album
Title	Year	CRO	Album
"Pun mjesec, ti i ja"	2021	9	Gori ulica
"—" denotes releases that did not chart or were not released in that territory.

== See also ==
- List of people from Sarajevo

Achievements
Preceded by Ivan Mikulić with "You Are The Only One"	Croatia in the Eurovision Song Contest; 2005	Succeeded by Severina with "Moja štikla"
