= Dallas Records =

Croatian record label

- Founded: 1987 (in Slovenia); 1994 (in Croatia)
- Founder: Goran Lisica
- Country of origin: Croatia
- Location: Zagreb
- Official website: www.dallas.hr

Dallas Records is a Croatian record label. It was established in 1987 (in Slovenia), and is owned and run by Goran Lisica - Fox, a music producer and manager who started his career in the 1970s as a music journalist.

Signed artists include Gibonni, Severina, Neno Belan, Danijela Martinović, Doris Dragović, BluVinil, Jinx and Let 3.
