= Milica Pavlović discography =

- Studio albums: 6
- EPs: 1
- Live albums: 9
- Compilation albums: 1
- Singles: 9
- Promotional singles: 22

Serbian singer Milica Pavlović has released five studio albums. Her debut album Govor tela, which was released in June 2014 under Grand Production, was sold in 30,000 copies. It was followed by Boginja (2016) and Zauvek (2018). In April 2022, Pavlović independently released Posesivna. The album spawned three top 25 tracks, including the song "Provereno", which peaked the Billboard's Croatia Songs chart. In June 2023, Pavlović released a new album Lav, only one year after the previous one. In May 2024, she released an extended play (EP) Milijarda.

== Albums ==
=== Studio albums ===
Title	Details	Circulation	Notes
Govor tela	Released: 28 June 2014; Label: Grand Production; Format: CD, digital download, streaming	30,000	Track listing: | No. | Title | Length | |---|---|---| | 1. | "Dominacija" | 3:13 | | 2. | "Tango" | 3:58 | | 3. | "Dve po dve" | 3:24 | | 4. | "Milimetar" | 4:06 | | 5. | "Seksi senjorita" | 3:13 | | 6. | "Pakleni plan" | 3:56 | | 7. | "Alibi" (featuring Nesh) | 3:16 | | 8. | "Alter ego" | 3:13 | | 9. | "Mash Up" | 4:43 | | Total length: | | 33:18 |
Boginja	Released: 16 December 2016; Label: Grand Production; Format: CD, digital download, streaming	6,000	Track listing: | No. | Title | Length | |---|---|---| | 1. | "Boginja" | 3:28 | | 2. | "Mogla sam" | 3:49 | | 3. | "Dvostruka igra" | 4:03 | | 4. | "Baja papaja" | 3:11 | | 5. | "Istanbul" | 3:35 | | 6. | "Još se branim ćutanjem" (featuring Alen Islamović) | 3:36 | | 7. | "Detektiv" | 3:13 | | 8. | "La Fiesta" | 3:55 | | 9. | "Selfie" | 4:03 | | 10. | "Ljubi ljubi" | 3:11 | | 11. | "Demantujem" | 3:51 | | Total length: | | 40:01 |
Zauvek	Released: 21 December 2018; Label: Grand Production; Format: CD, digital download, streaming	8,000	Track listing: | No. | Title | Length | |---|---|---| | 1. | "Hej ženo" | 3:46 | | 2. | "Da me voliš" | 3:43 | | 3. | "Zauvek" | 3:53 | | 4. | "Tako mi treba" | 4:22 | | 5. | "Pacijent" | 3:35 | | 6. | "Ovo boli" | 4:21 | | 7. | "Ne sećam se" | 3:37 | | 8. | "Spavaćica" | 3:26 | | 9. | "Kidaš me" (featuring Aca Lukas) | 4:05 | | 10. | "Operisan od ljubavi" | 3:27 | | Total length: | | 38:28 |
Posesivna	Released: 11 April 2022; Label: Senorita Music; Format: CD, digital download, streaming, memory stick	10,000	Track listing: | No. | Title | Length | |---|---|---| | 1. | "Posesivna bivša" | 3:46 | | 2. | "15ica" | 2:56 | | 3. | "Ne dam krevet" | 3:16 | | 4. | "Nema žene" | 2:49 | | 5. | "After kod Milice" | 3:08 | | 6. | "Mala s Himalaja" | 2:59 | | 7. | "Šećeru" (featuring Albino) | 3:16 | | 8. | "Tačno tako" | 3:28 | | 9. | "Striptizete" | 3:59 | | 10. | "Provereno" | 3:33 | | 11. | "Riba de luxe" | 2:46 | | 12. | "Suzo" | 2:38 | | 13. | "Oko moje" (featuring Saša Matić) | 3:58 | | 14. | "Dabogda propao" | 4:08 | | 15. | "Crna jutra (Balkan S&M)" | 3:17 | | Total length: | | 50:03 |
Lav	Released: 19 June 2023; Label: Senorita Music; Format: CD, digital download, streaming	10,000	Track listing: | No. | Title | Length | |---|---|---| | 1. | "Lav" | 2:44 | | 2. | "Kučketina" | 3:01 | | 3. | "Jaša" | 3:26 | | 4. | "Ne zovite me" | 3:12 | | 5. | "Kraljica prokletih" | 2:33 | | 6. | "Ilegala" (featuring Coby) | 3:06 | | 7. | "Lake note" | 3:57 | | 8. | "Na Zemlji Bog" | 3:02 | | 9. | "Dajem godinu" | 2:53 | | 10. | "Venčanje" | 3:22 | | 11. | "Status quo" (Desire RMX) | 3:45 | | Total length: | | 35:07 |
Caka	Released: 26 June 2026; Label: Senorita Music; Format: CD, digital download, streaming		Track listing: | No. | Title | Length | |---|---|---| | 1. | "Intro" | 0:17 | | 2. | "Caka" | 4:32 | | 3. | "Derište" | 3:37 | | 4. | "Veze bezveze" | 3:16 | | 5. | "Voli ga i ti" | 3:45 | | 6. | "Ćutim naglas" | 3:41 | | 7. | "Bez ljubavi" | 5:06 | | 8. | "Ti me nerviraš" | 3:49 | | 9. | "Ej ti moja" | 2:49 | | 10. | "Kleo" | 3:46 | | 11. | "Pesma s radija" | 3:28 | | 12. | "Outro" | 0:37 | | Total length: | | 38:43 |

=== Live albums ===
Title	Details
Lav Tour – BG Arena (Live)	Released: 31 May 2024; Label: Senorita Music; Format: Digital download, streaming
Kraljica juga (Live Čair)	Released: 29 July 2024; Label: Senorita Music; Format: Digital download, streaming
Lav Tour – Spens Novi Sad (Live)	Released: 14 July 2025; Label: Senorita Music; Format: Digital download, streaming
Lav Tour – Arena Zagreb (Live)	Released: 21 July 2025; Label: Senorita Music; Format: Digital download, streaming
Lav Tour – Laktaši | BL (Live)	Released: 28 July 2025; Label: Senorita Music; Format: Digital download, streaming
Lav Tour – Jane Sandanski | Skoplje (Live)	Released: 4 August 2025; Label: Senorita Music; Format: Digital download, streaming
Lav Tour – Dvorana Zamet | Rijeka (Live)	Released: 7 August 2025; Label: Senorita Music; Format: Digital download, streaming
Lav Tour – Skenderija| Sarajevo	Released: 11 August 2025; Label: Senorita Music; Format: Digital download, streaming
Kraljica juga 2 (Live Čair 2025)	Released: 26 February 2026; Label: Senorita Music; Format: Digital download, streaming

=== Compilation albums ===
Title	Details	Circulation
Grand dame 3 (with Tanja Savić and Rada Manojlović)	Released: 30 April 2020; Label: Grand Production; Format: CD, digital download, streaming	20,000

== Extended plays ==
Title
Milijarda
Details
- Released: 14 May 2024
- Label: Senorita Music
- Format: Digital download, streaming
Notes
Track listing
- No.	Title	Length
  1.	"Ona nosi Pradu"	2:57
  2.	"Gospode moj"	3:36
  3.	"Praštaj"	4:07
  4.	"Spavaćica" (Cavalier remix)	3:12
  5.	"Srce porodično" (BG Arena – Live)	4:27
  Total length:		18:19

== Singles ==
=== As lead artist ===
Title	Year	Peak chart positions	Album
Title	Year	CRO Billb.	Album
"Kidaš me" (with Aca Lukas)	2018	*	Zauvek and Uspavanka za ozbiljne bebe
"Status quo"	2020	*	Non-album singles
"Papi"	2020	*	Non-album singles
"Crna jutra (Balkan S&M)"	2021	*	Posesivna
"Oko moje" (with Saša Matić)	2021	*	Posesivna and Dva života
"Dabogda propao"	2021	*	Posesivna
"Venčanje"	2023	—	Lav
"Mashallah" (with Jelena Karleuša)	2023	—	Alpha
"ADHD"	2025	13	Non-album single

=== Promotional singles ===
Title	Year	Album
"Evolucija" (featuring Famos)	2021	Non-album singles
"Posesivna" (Acoustic Performance)	2022	Non-album singles
"Medley Performance MAC 2023"	2023	Non-album singles
"Leo Medley"	2023	Non-album singles
"Ne zovite me" (Love & Live)	2023	Non-album singles
"Lav" (Love & Live)	2023	Non-album singles
"Jesam te pustila" (Love & Live)	2023	Non-album singles
"Boginja" (Love & Live)	2023	Non-album singles
"Da se opet tebi vratim" (Love & Live)	2023	Non-album singles
"Milijarda ('Praštaj', 'Gospode moj', 'Ona nosi Pradu')"	2024	Non-album singles
"Niška banja x Vrtlog" (Kraljica juga | Live Čair) (featuring Dejan Petrović Big Band)	2024	Kraljica juga (Live Čair)
"Tačno tako" (Live Acoustic Session 2024)	2024	Non-album singles
"Pacijent" (Live Acoustic Session 2024)	2024	Non-album singles
"Ovo boli" (Live Acoustic Session 2024)	2024	Non-album singles
"Milimetar" (Live Acoustic Session 2024)	2024	Non-album singles
"Još se branim ćutanjem" (Live Acoustic Session 2024)	2024	Non-album singles
"Dvostruka igra" (Live Acoustic Session 2024)	2024	Non-album singles
"Da me voliš" (Live Acoustic Session 2024)	2024	Non-album singles
"Žena" (Cover) (with Nebojša Vojvodić)	2024	Non-album singles
"Talasna dužina" (Cover)	2024	Non-album singles
"Zlatiborske zore" (Uživo @ Grand Production)	2025	Non-album singles
"Kidaš me" (with Nebojša Vojvodić)	2025	Non-album singles

== Other charted songs ==
Title	Year	Peak chart positions	Album
Title	Year	CRO Billb.	Album
"Mogla sam"	2016	3	Boginja
"Šećeru" (with Albino)	2022	5	Posesivna
"Posesivna bivša"	2022	25	Posesivna
"Provereno"	2022	1	Posesivna
"Kučketina"	2023	19	Lav
"Ilegala" (featuring Coby)	2023	14	Lav

== Guest appearances ==
Title	Year	Other artist(s)	Album
"Dođi"	2010	none	Radijski festival 2010 – Revija muzike 2
"Chili, chili"	2012	Dejan Matić	Najnoviji singlovi 2012
"Da se opet rodim" (Live)	2023	Rifat Ramović	Nikad nije kasno Vol. 3 (Live)
"Stara igra"	2025	Coby	Дар и клетва

== Music videos ==
List of music videos, showing year released and directors
Title	Year	Director(s)
"Pakleni plan"	2013	Andrej Ilić
"Seksi senjorita"	2013	iCode Team
"Alibi" (featuring Nesh)	2014	Dimitrije Joković
"Dominacija"	2014	Aleksandar Kerekeš
"Dve po dve"	2014	Aleksandar Kerekeš
"Milimetar"	2014	Aleksandar Kerekeš
"Alter ego"	2014	Aleksandar Kerekeš
"Selfie"	2015	Aleksandar Kerekeš
"Demantujem"	2015	Aleksandar Kerekeš
"La Fiesta"	2016	Aleksandar Kerekeš
"Bailando"	2016	David Ljubenović
"Ljubi ljubi"	2016	David Ljubenović
"Još se branim ćutanjem" (with Alen Islamović)	2016	Aleksandar Kerekeš
"Boginja"	2016	David Ljubenović
"Mogla sam"	2016	Dušan Petrović
"Dvostruka igra"	2016	Dušan Petrović
"Baja papaja"	2016	David Ljubenović
"Detektiv"	2016	David Ljubenović
"Operisan od ljubavi"	2017	Aleksandar Kerekeš
"Kidaš me" (with Aca Lukas)	2018	Nemanja Novaković
"Hej ženo"	2018	Nemanja Novaković
"Da me voliš"	2018	Aleksandar Kerekeš
"Tako mi i treba"	2018	Aleksandar Kerekeš
"Spavaćica"	2018	Nemanja Novaković
"Zauvek"	2018	iCode Team
"Ovo boli"	2018	Darko Drinovac
"Pacijent"	2018	iCode Team
"Ne sećam se"	2018	Nemanja Novaković
"Status quo"	2020	Dušan Jauković
"Papi"	2020	Nemanja Novaković
"Crna jutra (Balkan S&M)"	2021	Nemanja Novaković
"Oko moje" (with Saša Matić)	2021	Nemanja Novaković
"Dabogda propao"	2021	Nemanja Novaković
