= Jelena Karleuša discography =

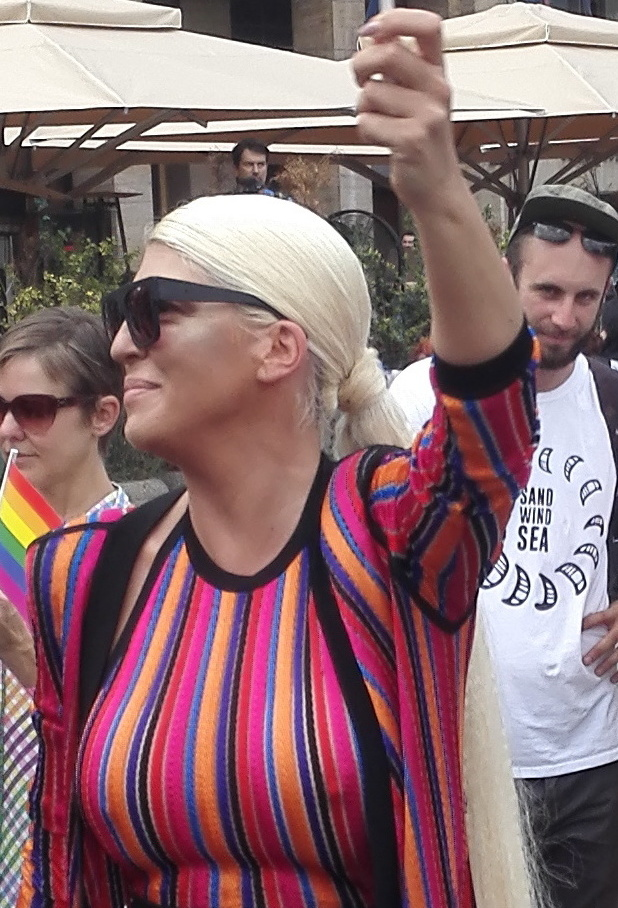
- Jelena Karleuša in 2017
- Studio albums: 12
- Live albums: 3
- Compilation albums: 4
- Singles: 19
- Music videos: 22

Serbian singer Jelena Karleuša has released twelve studio albums, three live albums, four compilation albums and numerous singles.

Her debut album, Ogledalce, was released on 24 April 1995 under Diskos.

== Albums ==
=== Studio albums ===
Title	Album details	Notes
Ogledalce	Released: 24 April 1995; Label: Diskos; Formats: LP, cassette	Track listing: | No. | Title | Length | |---|---|---| | 1. | "Ogledalce" | 3:35 | | 2. | "Gde smo pogrešili mi" | 3:06 | | 3. | "Biću tvoja" | 3:29 | | 4. | "Da mi nisi drag" | 3:22 | | 5. | "Najbolja drugarice" | 3:15 | | 6. | "Lagao si, lagao" | 3:54 | | 7. | "Suze devojačke" | 3:39 | | 8. | "Dala sam ti noć" | 3:01 | | Total length: | | 26:44 |
Ženite se momci	Released: 1996; Label: Daniel Estrada, PGP RTS; Formats: CD, cassette	Track listing: | No. | Title | Length | |---|---|---| | 1. | "Ženite se momci" | 3:31 | | 2. | "Hoću sa tobom" | 3:41 | | 3. | "Tvojom ulicom" | 3:35 | | 4. | "Moji drugovi" | 3:00 | | 5. | "Ne mrzim te ni sad" | 3:36 | | 6. | "Sad smo stranci postali" | 3:49 | | 7. | "Sad znam" | 3:52 | | 8. | "Mogu biti pamuk" | 4:04 | | 9. | "A sada idem" | 4:19 | | Total length: | | 33:30 |
Veštice, vile	Released: 1997; Label: ZaM, Vujin Trade Line AG; Formats: CD, cassette	Track listing: | No. | Title | Length | |---|---|---| | 1. | "Antihrist" | 3:11 | | 2. | "Veštice, vile" | 3:10 | | 3. | "Cicija" | 3:09 | | 4. | "Grom nek ubije" | 3:53 | | 5. | "Oko crno" | 3:16 | | 6. | "Ko ovu dramu režira" | 3:45 | | 7. | "Zemlja se zaustavlja" | 3:53 | | 8. | "Košuljica" | 3:52 | | Total length: | | 28:13 |
Jelena	Released: 1998; Label: ZaM, Raglas Records; Formats: CD, cassette	Track listing: | No. | Title | Length | |---|---|---| | 1. | "Žena zmija" | 3:11 | | 2. | "Ne veruj ženama" | 4:43 | | 3. | "Sudbinu poreci" | 3:40 | | 4. | "Jelena" | 3:16 | | 5. | "Kume" | 3:19 | | 6. | "Žene vole dijamante" | 3:37 | | 7. | "Kraljica i sluga" | 3:36 | | 8. | "Zar sam ja to zaslužila" | 3:08 | | Total length: | | 28:34 |
Gili, gili	Released: 23 December 1999; Label: Grand Production; Formats: CD, cassette	Track listing: | No. | Title | Length | |---|---|---| | 1. | "Oro osmoro" | 3:06 | | 2. | "Beznadežan slučaj" | 3:06 | | 3. | "Gili, gili" | 3:44 | | 4. | "Zamena za ljubav" | 3:22 | | 5. | "Trauma" | 3:31 | | 6. | "Naša žena" | 3:07 | | 7. | "Lepa mlada" | 3:20 | | 8. | "Sve joj moje daj" | 3:29 | | Total length: | | 26:45 |
Za svoje godine (also known as Ludača)	Released: January 2001; Label: Best Records, JVP Vertrieb AG; Formats: CD, cassette	Track listing: | No. | Title | Length | |---|---|---| | 1. | "Ludača" | 3:53 | | 2. | "Bezobrazna" | 3:41 | | 3. | "Pregorela" | 3:38 | | 4. | "Bye, bye" | 3:55 | | 5. | "Za tobom hodam ja" | 3:27 | | 6. | "Pa, naravno" | 3:26 | | 7. | "Nije ona nego ja" | 4:05 | | 8. | "Mene pale" | 3:30 | | 9. | "Balada za Zorana" | 4:24 | | Total length: | | 33:43 |
Samo za tvoje oči	Released: 20 December 2002; Label: RTV BK Telecom; Formats: CD, cassette	Track listing: | No. | Title | Length | |---|---|---| | 1. | "Manijak" | 3:46 | | 2. | "Samo za tvoje oči" | 4:10 | | 3. | "Pazi se" | 3:18 | | 4. | "Moj dragi" | 4:13 | | 5. | "Ne, ne, ne" | 4:13 | | 6. | "Radoznala" | 3:59 | | 7. | "Još te volim" | 4:54 | | 8. | "Zar ne" | 3:31 | | 9. | "Love" | 3:36 | | 10. | "Manijak" (Valentino remix) | 5:13 | | Total length: | | 40:58 |
Magija	Released: 22 February 2005; Label: City Records; Formats: CD, cassette	Track listing: | No. | Title | Length | |---|---|---| | 1. | "Slatka mala" | 3:26 | | 2. | "Magija" | 4:28 | | 3. | "Nisi u pravu" | 3:27 | | 4. | "Da te nisam prevarila..." | 3:07 | | 5. | "Ne smem da se zaljubim u tebe" (featuring Saša Matić) | 3:44 | | 6. | "Upravo ostavljena" | 3:47 | | 7. | "Ide maca oko tebe" | 3:24 | | 8. | "Krađa" | 3:47 | | 9. | "Sve je dozvoljeno" | 3:30 | | 10. | "Moli me" (featuring Marcus) | 3:00 | | Total length: | | 35:40 |
Revolution	Released: 7 February 2008; Label: City Records; Formats: CD, cassette	Track listing: | No. | Title | Length | |---|---|---| | 1. | "Tihi ubica" | 3:54 | | 2. | "Testament" | 3:51 | | 3. | "Ko ti to baje" | 3:52 | | 4. | "Saki" | 3:09 | | 5. | "Casino" | 5:12 | | 6. | "Jedna noć i kajanje" | 3:31 | | 7. | "Pamet u glavu" | 3:14 | | 8. | "Baš je dobro biti ja" (featuring Marcus) | 2:50 | | 9. | "Mala" | 3:39 | | 10. | "Mala" (Teatro Mix) | 3:49 | | Total length: | | 36:44 |
Diva	Released: 11 June 2012; Label: City Records; Formats: CD	Track listing: | No. | Title | Length | |---|---|---| | 1. | "Mikrofon" | 3:18 | | 2. | "Pucaj u ljubav (Ne vredi)" | 3:38 | | 3. | "Krimi rad" (featuring Teča) | 4:00 | | 4. | "Savršen zločin" | 3:25 | | 5. | "Sodoma & Gomora" | 3:00 | | 6. | "Insomnia" (featuring Mirza) | 4:07 | | 7. | "Radim na bol" | 3:31 | | 8. | "Muškarac koji mrzi žene" | 4:01 | | 9. | "Duboko ranjena" | 3:48 | | 10. | "Nova religija (Plava Šeherezada)" | 4:03 | | 11. | "So" (featuring Nesh) | 4:05 | | Total length: | | 41:29 |
Alpha	Released: 13 August 2023; Label: JK Entertainment, Virgin; Formats: Digital distribution, CD, LP	Track listing: | No. | Title | Length | |---|---|---| | 1. | "KarlyB*tch" | 2:17 | | 2. | "Benga" | 2:58 | | 3. | "Block!" | 2:35 | | 4. | "Mashallah" (with Milica Pavlović) | 2:28 | | 5. | "Alien" | 2:51 | | 6. | "Karma" | 2:29 | | 7. | "Takita" | 2:56 | | 8. | "Rehabilitacija" | 3:38 | | 9. | "Lucifer" | 2:25 | | 10. | "KarlyB*tch 2" | 2:37 | | Total length: | | 27:14 |
Omega	Released: 20 August 2023; Label: JK Entertainment, Virgin; Formats: Digital distribution, CD, LP	Track listing: | No. | Title | Length | |---|---|---| | 1. | "Ja" | 3:40 | | 2. | "Nepogrešivo" (with Devito featuring DJ Hamida) | 2:46 | | 3. | "Abu Dhabi" | 3:14 | | 4. | "La Bomba" | 2:12 | | 5. | "Romane" | 2:31 | | 6. | "Ludilo" | 3:26 | | 7. | "XY" | 3:42 | | 8. | "Romane" (Mix) | 3:04 | | 9. | "Minut" | 1:01 | | Total length: | | 25:36 |
Enigma	To be released	

=== Live albums ===
Title	Album details
All About Diva	Released: 2010; Label: City Records; Formats: CD, DVD
Unplugged	Released: 26 July 2020; Label: JK Music; Formats: Digital distribution
Jelena Karleuša: Music Week (Live)	Released: 21 March 2022; Label: Sky Music; Formats: Digital distribution

=== Compilation albums ===
Title	Album details
Zovem se Jelena, Jelena	Released: 1999; Label: JVP Vertrieb AG; Formats: CD
The Diamond Collection	Released: 15 July 2009; Label: City Records; Formats: CD
The Best of Collection	Released: 2018; Label: City Records; Formats: CD, digital distribution
Zlatna kolekcija	Released: 10 July 2025; Label: City Records; Formats: Digital distribution

== Singles ==
=== As lead artist ===
Year	Title	Album
"Ne smem da se zaljubim u tebe" (with Saša Matić)	2004	Magija
"Casino"	2007	Revolution
"Tihi ubica"	2007	Revolution
"Insomnia" (featuring Mirza)	2009	Diva
"Nova religija (Plava Šeherezada)"	2011	Diva
"Muškarac koji mrzi žene"	2011	Diva
"Ferrari" (featuring Teča and Nesh)	2013	Non-album singles
"Bankina" (featuring Aca Lukas)	2017	Non-album singles
"O.S.T.A.V.LJ.A.M.T.E." (featuring Azis)	2017	Non-album singles
"LaJK" (featuring Gazda Paja)	2019	Non-album singles
"Mashallah" (with Milica Pavlović)	2023	Alpha
"Nepogrešivo" (with Devito featuring DJ Hamida)	2023	Omega
"KarlyB*tch"	2023	Alpha
"Benga"	2024	Alpha
"Jedno đubre obično"	2025	Damir Handanović – Novi zvuk
"Sad je sve okej"	2026	Enigma
"Mata Hari"	2026	Enigma
"BalkanBoy"	2026	Enigma

=== As featured artist ===
Year	Title	Album
"Preživeću" (Dejan Milićević featuring Jelena Karleuša)	1999	Kraj je veka
"Mani se" (Velimir Mitrović Gale featuring Jelena Karleuša)	2008	Gale
"Marihuana" (Miligram featuring Surreal and Jelena Karleuša)	2018	Crna kutija

== Music videos ==
Year	Title	Director
1995	"Ogledalce"	Unknown
1995	"Najbolja drugarice"	Unknown
1995	"Ženite se momci"	Unknown
1996	"Sad smo stranci postali"	Unknown
1999	"Preživeću"	Dejan Milićević
1999	"Gili, gili"	Dejan Milićević
2001	"Ludača"	Dejan Milićević
2002	"Samo za tvoje oči"	Aleksandar Kerekeš
2002	"Manijak"	Aleksandar Kerekeš
2005	"Slatka mala"	Dejan Milićević
2006	"Upravo ostavljena"	Dejan Milićević
2008	"Tihi ubica"	Aleksandar Kerekeš
2009	"Mani se"	Goran Šljivić
2010	"Insomnia"	Unknown
2012	"Krimi rad"	Dejan Milićević
2012	"So"	Dejan Milićević
2018	"Marihuana"	New Era Digital
2023	"KarlyB*tch"	Nemanja Novaković and Zoran Birtašević
2024	"Benga"	Nemanja Novaković and Zoran Birtašević
2025	"Jedno đubre obično"	Dejan Milićević
2026	"BalkanBoy"	Nemanja Novaković and Zoran Birtašević
2026	"Mata Hari"	Nemanja Novaković and Zoran Birtašević

=== Guest appearances ===
Year	Title	Artist(s)	Director
2018	"Galama" (#PunoKošta Artwork)	Dara Bubamara	Dejan Milićević
2018	"HMoschino"	Coby	Dejan Milićević
2025	"Maria Magdalena"	Sevdaliza featuring Irmãs de Pau	Jenna Marsh
