= All About Diva =

Live album by Jelena Karleuša
- Released: November 2010
- Recorded: May 15, 2010
- Venues: Belgrade Arena (Belgrade, Serbia)
- Genres: Electronic; pop
- Length: 67:18 (CD)
- Label: City Records
- Director: Zoran Birtašević

Jelena Karleuša chronology
The Diamond Collection (2009)	All About Diva (2010)	Diva (2012)

All About Diva is the first live album by Serbian singer Jelena Karleuša released in November 2010 by City Records. Directed by Zoran Birtašević, the album chronicles Karleuša's 2010 Belgrade concert and includes the full version of the video broadcast. The DVD contains the entire concert and the CD includes seventeen live songs.

In 2012, the album was certified platinum by the label.

== Track listing ==
All About Diva
No.	Title	From	Length
1.	"Samo za tvoje oči"	Samo za tvoje oči (2002)	4:30
2.	"Moj dragi"	Samo za tvoje oči	3:45
3.	"Candy Life" (Interlude)		3:17
4.	"Slatka mala"	Magija (2005)	3:04
5.	"Jelena"	Jelena (1998)	3:42
6.	"Žene vole dijamante"	Jelena	4:58
7.	"Baš je dobro biti ja"	JK Revolution (2008)	4:58
8.	"Religion" (Interlude)		2:42
9.	"Magija"	Magija	3:46
10.	"Ko ti to baje"	JK Revolution	4:07
11.	"Ne smem da se zaljubim u tebe" (featuring Saša Matić)	Magija	3:57
12.	"Ko ovu dramu režira"	Veštice, vile (1997)	4:05
13.	"Madness" (Interlude)		3:30
14.	"Još te volim"	Samo za tvoje oči	4:30
15.	"Ludača"	Za svoje godine (2001)	3:51
16.	"Tihi ubica"	JK Revolution	3:35
17.	"Manijak"	Samo za tvoje oči	5:30

== Release history ==
Country	Date	Format	Label
Serbia	May 15, 2010	CD, DVD	City Records
