= Jelena Karleuša =

Serbian singer and media personality (born 1978)

- Јелена Карлеуша
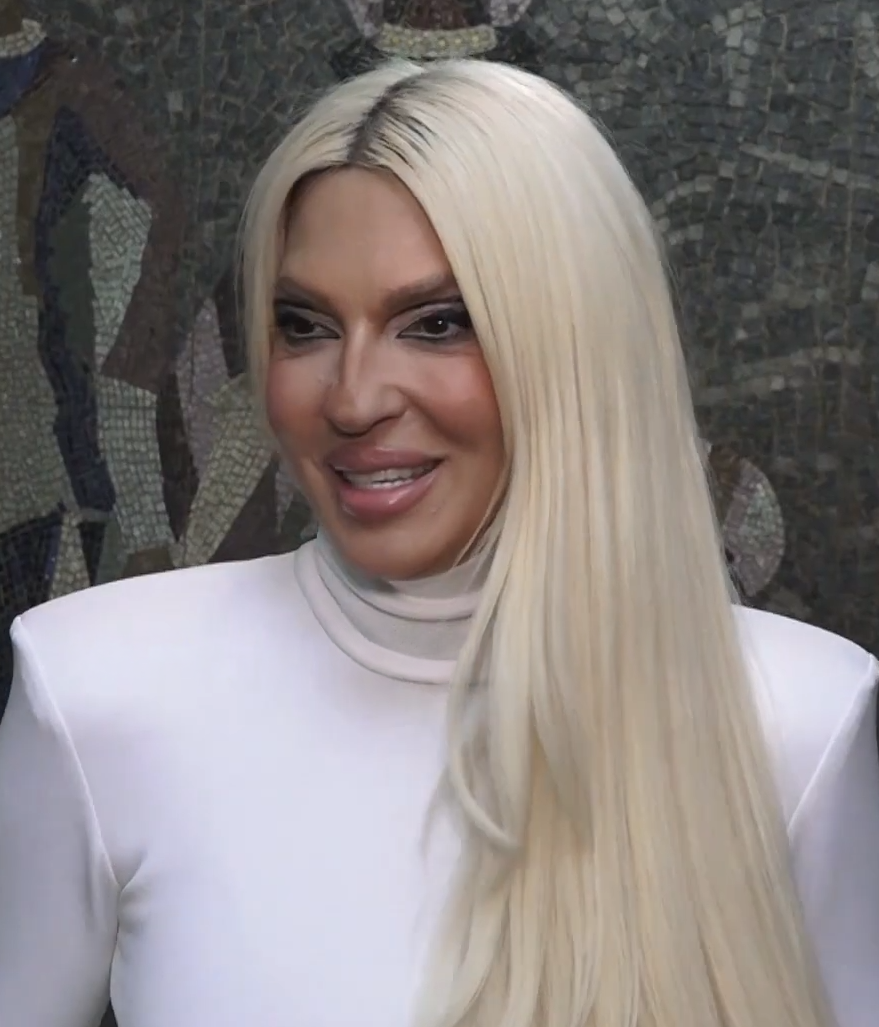
- Karleuša in 2024
- Born: 17 August 1978 (age 48); Belgrade, SR Serbia, SFR Yugoslavia
- Citizenship: Serbia; Slovenia
- Occupations: Singer; media personality
- Years active: 1995–present
- Spouses: Bojan Karić (m. 2004; div. 2005) Duško Tošić (m. 2008; div. 2024)
- Children: 2
- Awards: Full list
- Musical career
- Genres: Turbo-folk; pop-folk; folk; electropop; dance-pop; pop-rap
- Instruments: Vocal; flute
- Labels: Diskos; PGP-RTS; ZaM; Grand; Best Records; BK Sound; Heaven; City; JK ENTERTAINMENT; Virgin
- Website: karleusa.com

Jelena Karleuša (Serbian Cyrillic: Јелена Карлеуша; born 17 August 1978) is a Serbian singer and media personality. Born and raised in Belgrade, she began her music career with the release of her debut album Ogledalce (1995) at the age of 16. Karleuša has released twelve studio albums to date and has held two major solo concerts in Belgrade: All About Diva at the Belgrade Arena (2010) and Viva La Diva at Ušće Park (2013).

Additionally, she served as a judge on the singing competition television shows Zvezde Granda (2015–2021) and Pinkove Zvezde (2025–present). Focus and W have described Karleuša as the "Lady Gaga of Serbia" and "Madonna of the Balkans" respectively. Her perception and popularity have been influenced by her controversial—often scrutinized—persona and art, as well as by her outspoken sociopolitical views and frequent disputes with other public figures.

== Early life ==
Jelena Karleuša was born on 17 August 1978 in Belgrade, SR Serbia, SFR Yugoslavia. She is the only child to Ptuj-born journalist and radio host, Divna Karleuša (née Tomažič; 1958–2019), and Belgrade-born police chief, Dragan Karleuša (b. 1947). Her background is ethnically diverse, with ancestry from Slovenia, Croatia, Bosnia and Herzegovina, Kosovo, and Serbia.

Her maternal grandfather, Jurij Tomažič, was an ethnic Slovene and JNA military pilot who died in a plane crash in 1967. Her maternal grandmother, Darina, was from Doboj, Bosnia and Herzegovina. On her paternal side, her grandfather, Pavle Karleuša, was born in Belgrade, although his parents were from the Lika region of Croatia, where the surname "Karleuša" originates. Her great-grandfather, Nikola Karleuša, was a Croatian Serb who served in the Austro-Hungarian Army. Her paternal grandmother's family came from Vranje, Serbia. Karleuša has stated that her maternal great-grandmother was an Austrian countess who has a street in Graz named after her, although this claim was denied by the city.

Karleuša grew up in the Fontana neighborhood of New Belgrade, where she lived with her mother after her parents' divorce. Karleuša has said that her father's repeated infidelity led to the end of the marriage and she witnessed one such incident herself. She has two younger half-brothers, Ivan and Nikola, from her father's second marriage. She attended Zemun Gymnasium, but eventually graduated from the New Belgrade High School of Tourism. According to Karleuša, she also attended music school and played the flute as a child.

== Career ==
=== 1995–2003: Career beginnings and initial success ===
At the age of 16, Karleuša made her recording debut with the album Ogledalce, released on 24 April 1995 by Diskos. In 2019, she revealed that Serbian pop-folk singer Dragana Mirković helped her to finance its recording. Her sophomore album, Ženite se, momci, was released the following year by PGP-RTS. It was followed by Veštice, vile (1997) and Jelena (1998), released through Zabava Miliona (ZaM). On these records Karleuša began working with prolific lyricist Marina Tucaković, who wrote some of her best-known songs. On 23 December 1999, she released her only album with Lepa Brena's label Grand Production, entitled Gili, gili.

Her sixth studio album, Za svoje godine, was released in January 2001 through Best Records. On 20 December 2002, Samo za tvoje oči was released by BK Sound. The album was produced by Phoebus in collaboration with Greek label Heaven Music. Karleuša also signed a four-year contract with Heaven Music.

=== 2004–2013: Magija, JK Revolution, Diva and major concerts ===
In February 2004, Karleuša competed in the Serbian national selection for the Eurovision Song Contest, then called Beovizija, with the song "Moli me". She finished in 11th place and thus failed to qualify to the final. Following her performance on Beovizija, Karleuša allegedly got banned from Radio Television of Serbia by its director, Aleksandar Tijanić. According to Karleuša, the reason behind this decision was due to the fact that her appearance and music were deemed "inappropriate" by Tijanić. She would not feature on the channel until March 2017, when she was a guest on a talk show about fashion. On 22 February 2005, Karleuša released her first album under City Records, titled Magija. Her following album, JK Revolution, was released on 7 February 2008. It sold 280,000 units.

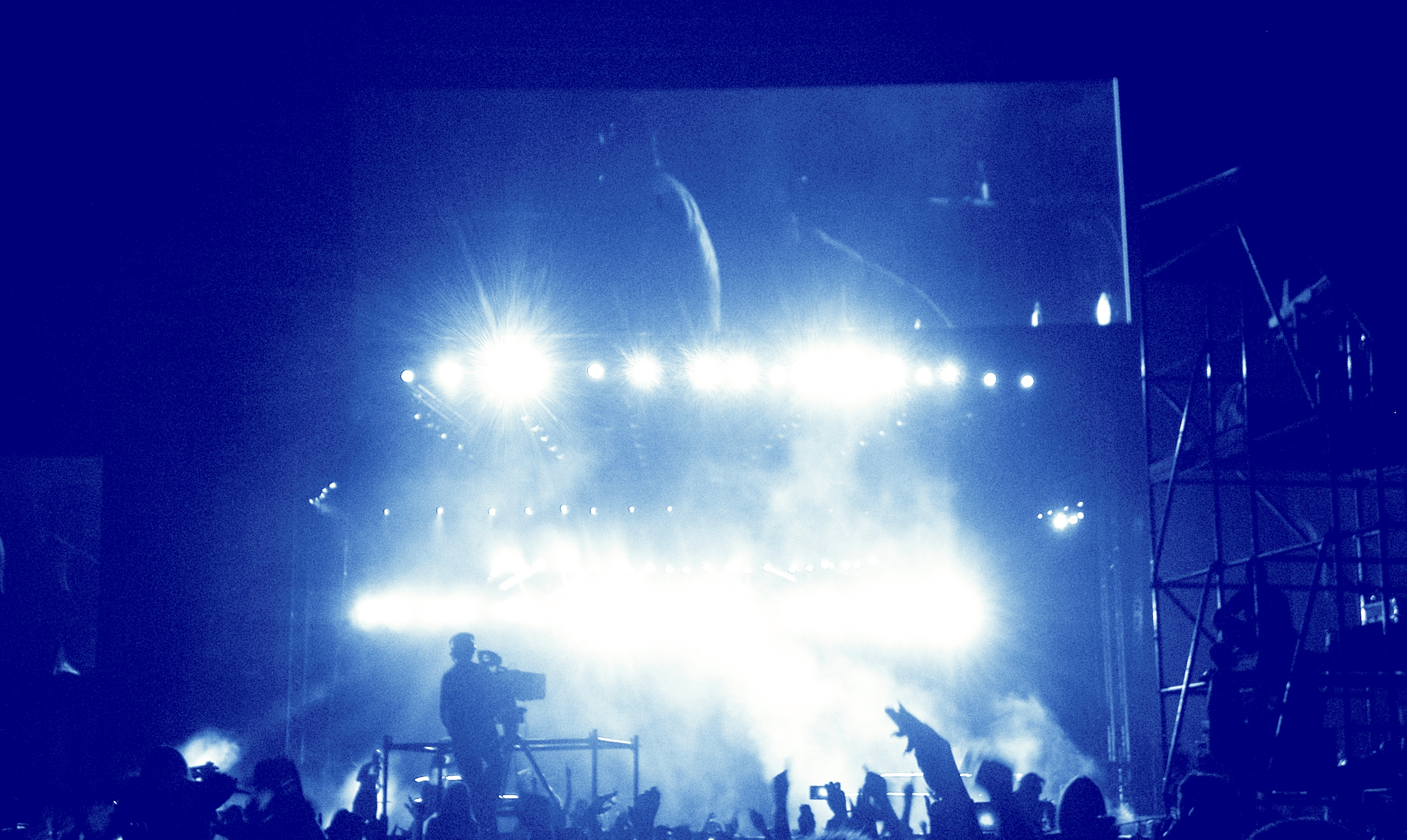
Viva La Diva concert in Ušće, Belgrade.

In March 2009, she was a guest on the third season of Big Brother VIP. On 15 July, Karleuša released her greatest hits compilation, titled The Diamond Collection. Later that year in December, she released the single "Insomnia", which covered a song from the Bollywood movie Rab Ne Bana Di Jodi. "Insomnia" became one of the first Serbian music videos to go viral on YouTube. Karleuša held her first major solo concert, All About Diva, in the Belgrade Arena on 15 May 2010, to an audience of 10,000 people. The All About Diva live album and DVD were released in November 2010. The same year, Karleuša also landed a column in the daily newspaper Kurir, which saw widespread attention for her progressive views, such as those on the LGBT community, but also for her outspoken comments on public figures like Ceca and Dragan Marković.

Her tenth studio album, Diva, was released on 11 June 2012, after being postponed several times. It was preceded by three singles: "Insomnia" (2009), "Muškarac koji mrzi žene" (2011) and "Nova religija (Plava Šeherezada)" (2011). Diva sold 100,000 copies. The album was promoted with her second major solo concert, Viva La Diva, on 15 June 2013 in Ušće, Belgrade. It began after over an hour of delay due to technical issues regarding video and audio production, which continued throughout the concert. Nevertheless, she managed to perform all of the songs. According to her management, there were 40,000 people at the concert, while other publications claim that there were 10,000 people. Afterwards, Karleuša faced backlash from the media, who described her concert as a failure by comparing it to Ceca's concert in Ušće, which was held later that month. Additionally, she cut her ties with RTV Pink and City Records following a disagreement with its owner and CEO, Željko Mitrović.

=== 2014–2022: Zvezde Granda and extended releasing hiatus ===
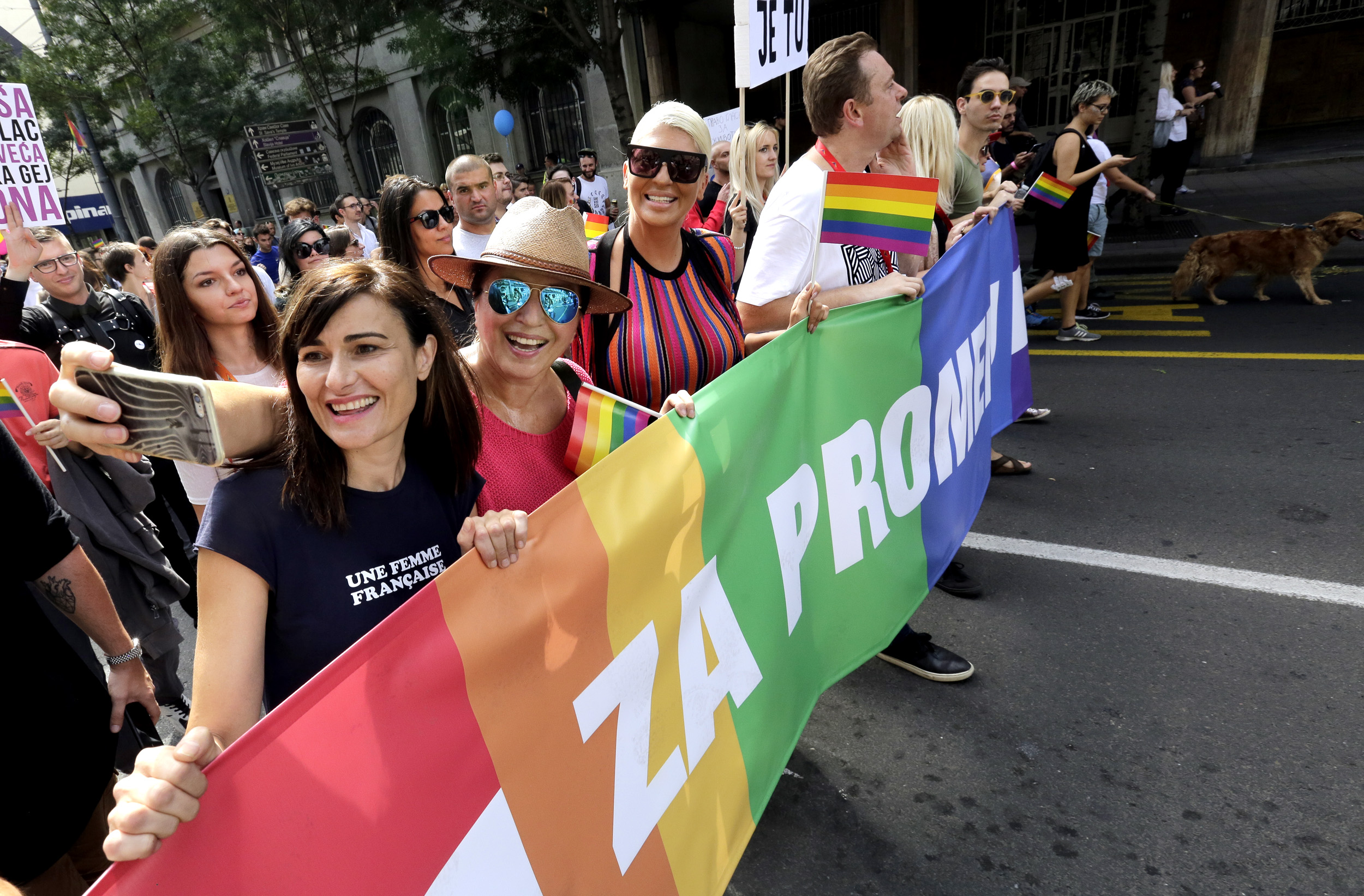
Karleuša with Biljana Srbljanović and Mirjana Karanović at Belgrade Pride, 2017

In September 2015, Karleuša joined the judging panel of the singing competition show Zvezde Granda. Throughout 2015, Karleuša received international attention after accusing Kim Kardashian, and later Beyoncé, of copying her fashion style. She was subsequently featured on The Wendy Williams Show, among many other international media outlets. The following year, Jelena's style was praised by Kardashian in her Woman Crush Wednesday blog, claiming that she had only heard of Karleuša after the allegations.

At the beginning of 2016, Karleuša revealed that Amy (2015), which won Best Documentary Feature Film at the 88th Academy Awards, falsely used unlicensed scenes from her Viva La Diva concert as ones of Amy Winehouse's last (her 2011 performance at Kalemegdan Park). Karleuša initially planned to settle a lawsuit for copyright infringement against the creators, but eventually gave up due to her "respect of the late singer". In March 2016, she made a guest performance at the Vodafone Park in Istanbul after her husband's (Duško Tošić) team, Beşiktaş J.K. had won the national championship. On 28 June 2017, Karleuša presented her first releases since 2013: duets with Aca Lukas and Azis, respectively titled "Bankina" and "Ostavljam te", which were performed during the live finale of Zvezde Granda.

On 29 January 2019, Karleuša performed "LaJK" featuring rapper Gazda Paja at the 2019 Music Awards Ceremony. On 24 May 2020, she held a live stream concert via music service YouBox, which attracted over 200,000 viewers. Karleuša was joined on stage by the girl-group Hurricane, who were supposed to represent Serbia at the Eurovision Song Contest that year before cancellation due to the COVID-19 pandemic, and singer Milica Pavlović. In September 2021, she announced her decision to quit Zvezde Granda after five consecutive seasons. For New Year's Eve, Karleuša performed alongside Marija Šerifović and Sara Jo in front of the House of the National Assembly to an estimated crowd of 50,000 people. In October 2022, she made her runway debut at the Steve Madden fashion show in Belgrade.

=== 2023–2026: Alpha and Omega ===
At the beginning of August 2023, composer and husband of Marina Tucaković, Aleksandar "Futa" Radulović, forced the closure of Karleuša's YouTube channel for alleged copyright infringement of his late wife's work. Subsequently, on 13 and 20 August, Karleuša released her long-awaited studio albums, entitled Alpha and Omega, under JK Entrainment and in distribution deal with Virgin Music Group and Telekom Srbija. On 18 September, the albums were promoted with a free entrance concert at the Belgrade Waterfront. The live show, which was broadcast on several regional TV channels, featured performances from the artists whom Karleuša collaborated with on Alpha and Omega – Milica Pavlović, Devito, Sajsi MC, and Mimi Mercedez.

On 1 March 2024, Karleuša walked the Vetements runway show during the Paris Fashion Week. Her runway walk in Paris appeared on 18 September 2024 in the "Georgina in Paris" episode of I Am Georgina. On 19 October 2024, Karleuša kicked off her Alpha and Omega Tour in the Jane Sandanski Arena in Skopje, North Macedonia. However, Skopje remained the only stop of the tour. On 25 November, Karleuša held a promo event at Galerija Belgrade for the launch of her fragrance and body mists, named JA after a track of Omega. Upon announcement of Karleuša's show in Kragujevac on 31 December 2024, due to her pro-government stance, citizens of Kragujevac started a petition against it that accumulated over 8,000 signatures by 17 December.

On New Year's Eve and New Year's Day, Karleuša performed in Kragujevac and Bor, respectively. Due to threats of riots by anti-government protesters, her Kragujevac show was protected by a large number of police forces. She claimed that the show had been attended by 70,000 people and chastised Radio Television of Serbia for not reporting about it. Karleuša's claims were supported by the pro-government tabloid Informer, but were soon debunked after photos from the show were shared online and it became apparent that the attendance was low. The Bor show was attended by an even lower number of people, estimated at around 1,000. On 7 January 2025, Christmas Day according to the Julian calendar followed by the Serbian Orthodox Church, Prva Srpska Televizija aired a television special Gala veče s Jelenom Karleušom featuring Karleuša performing in front of the Museum of Yugoslavia, accompanied by a symphony orchestra. The songs performed included a cover of "Vidovdan". Despite Karleuša dubbing it a celebration of 30th anniversary of her career, according to Nielsen Media Research, the special was seen by a lacklustre 6.13% of viewers. In honor of the 20th anniversary of Damir Handanović's career, Karleuša agreed to participate in his project Novi zvuk for which he rearranged a number of hits from his repertoire; Karleuša herself covered "Jedno đubre obično", originally performed by Katarina Grujić in 2013. The cover was released on 8 May 2025. On 3 August 2025, Karleuša held a public concert in Kopaonik, which the Municipality of Raška paid 2.4 million RSD for. It attracted merely around 200 people, despite free entry. On 15 August 2025, Karleuša and Željko Mitrović jointly announced that she would be joining the jury of Pinkove Zvezde. On 30 December 2025, Karleuša and Boki 13 released "Kaligula 2", a remix of Boki 13's 2010 track "Kaligula". The original song was initially intended for release by Karleuša and was meant to be premiered at All About Diva Show; however, she ultimately decided not to release it and instead gave it to Boki 13.

=== 2026–present: Enigma ===
On 3 July 2026, Karleuša premiered the first single, "Sad je sve okej", from her upcoming album, Enigma, with a live performance during the season finale of Pinkove Zvezde. On 14 July 2026, she released 2 more singles—"Balkanboy" and "Mata Hari"—both with music videos.

== Personal life ==
Between 1999 and 2000, Karleuša dated mobster Zoran "Ćanda" Davidović. Ćanda was assassinated 23 March 2000 in an ambush in Novi Sad while on his way back home from a funeral; the culprits were never arrested, although they were presumed to be members of the Zemun Clan. Karleuša was the one who identified Ćanda's body. She later dedicated her Za svoje godine (2001) album track "Balada za Zorana" to him. She has also stated that she borrowed money to pay for his funeral expenses.

On 23 September 2004, Karleuša married Bojan Karić, the nephew of Serbian businessman and politician Bogoljub Karić. They separated four months later and divorced in March 2005. Karleuša later said that Bogoljub Karić had strongly opposed the marriage, citing her unpopularity in Serbia as the reason.

On 28 June 2008, she married soccer player Duško Tošić. They have two daughters: Atina (born 7 September 2008) and Nika (born 7 September 2009). In January 2022, Tošić received a 30-day restriction order under suspicion of domestic abuse following a report by Karleuša on 7 January. According to the media, Karleuša had previously reported her husband for physical assault in March 2020. In both cases, she ultimately decided not to press charges against him. In September 2024, both Karleuša and Tošić confirmed in separate statements that they were filing for a divorce after years of separation.

In December 2020, Karleuša stated that she holds a Slovenian passport because her mother was born in Slovenia. Karleuša identifies as an atheist, although she was baptized in an Orthodox church before her wedding to Karić.

== Activism and philanthropy ==
Because of her adovcacy for LGBT rights in Serbia, Karleuša was declared the Serbian female gay icon of 2010 by the Gay Lesbian Info Centre. In September 2017, she opened the annual Belgrade Pride as the parade's "godmother". As a practicing vegetarian, Karleuša has also been vocal on the topic of animal rights. In July 2018, she collaborated with PETA on their anti-fur campaign.

In addition, Karleuša has supported various other causes during her career. Following the 2014 Southeast Europe floods, she supplied Serbian shelters with basic necessities for three consecutive days. Same year, Karleuša and Tošić were amongst the few regional celebrities who financially contributed to ALS research after participating in the Ice Bucket Challenge. In 2015, she performed at Donna Ares' charity concert for victims of cancer in the Zetra Olympic Hall, Sarajevo. In December 2018, Karleuša donated 100,000 RSD to VK Partizan for pool-heating during winter seasons.

== Controversies ==
Karleuša has developed a reputation for disputes with several regional public figures on social media, particularly Instagram and Twitter, including Ceca, Anastasija Ražnatović, Aca Lukas, Severina, Viki Miljković, Baka Prase, Marija Šerifović, Rada Manojlović, Aleksandra Prijović, Maya Berović, Vojislav Šešelj, Dragan Marković, Ognjen Vranješ, Kristijan Golubović, Breskvica, Ivan Ivanović, Voyage, Sloboda Mićalović, Edita Aradinović, Ana Nikolić, Seka Aleksić, Nada Obrić, Dara Bubamara, Nucci, Neda Ukraden, Emina Jahović, Milica Pavlović, Tea Tairović, and Selma Bajrami, and several international public figures such as Kim Kardashian, Kanye West, Nikita Dragun, Dua Lipa, Beyoncé and Madonna.

=== Severina ===
After Croatian singer Severina was denied entry to Serbia in August 2024 due to her comments on the Srebrenica massacre, Karleuša took to Instagram to publicly insult her and accusing her of drug dealing, fascism and hate. Severina responded saying that Karleuša "graduated from the Aleksandar Vučić school of manipulation of facts […]." After months of social media arguments between two, Karleuša made a public appearance on national television attacking Severina. Karleuša continued being critical of Severina after she spoke out against the Government of Serbia and against Vučić himself multiple times. More specifically, Karleuša criticized Vučković in light of the United Nations General Assembly's 23 May 2024 adoption of Resolution 78/282, which deals with the Srebrenica genocide which Vučković condemned. Although she herself had condemned the massacre in 2014 and 2016, Karleuša called out Vučković for dubbing it a genocide instead of simply a "crime". Afterwards, Karleuša would continue to accuse Vučković on numerous occasions of endorsing the Ustasha genocide of Serbs and the Operation Storm exodus.

=== Incident with Zvezde Granda contestant Vanja Knežević ===
In 2021, Vanja Knežević came into the public spotlight when she was disqualified from Zvezde Granda after sharing insulting comments on Instagram about Karleuša, who was a member of the jury at the time. A few months prior the two got into an argument on the show regarding Knežević's singing and physical appearance, which Karleuša described as "18-year-old auntie". Karleuša received backlash for her comments. Later, Karleuša announced on her Instagram that she would be suing Knežević, stating: "Because of the call to violence, as well as the statements that caused a brutal media lynching of me and my minor children, I have decided to file a criminal complaint against the Grand candidate, Vanja Knežević." However, Karleuša eventually gave up on suing Knežević.

=== Instagram petition ===
On 2 February 2025, the civic association Eko Straža made a petition to Meta Platforms, the owner of Instagram, for shutting down Karleuša's Instagram account. As the reason for that, they accused Karleuša's Instagram posts and activities of promoting hate speech, harassment and misinformation. Requiring 350,000 signatures, they received more than 270,500 within a day. The account was banned on 10 February 2025. This marked the second time Karleuša's Instagram was shut down or was under petition to shut down. In May 2024, Karleuša's Instagram account was shut down by 100,000 reports (see § Political views).

Karleuša created a new Instagram account on 15 May 2025, only days after announcing her intent to travel to the United States and meet Meta representatives in person with the ultimate goal of restoring her previous account. However, on 5 June 2025, Karleuša's new account was shut down as well, this time for alleged purchasing two million fake followers, a number identical to that on her previous account, within a short period of time.

=== Political views ===
Throughout the years, Karleuša has supported various political causes and individuals. In a 1998 Svet interview, she showed sympathies for Slobodan Milošević, stating that she found him "most likeable". On the other hand, following the 2000 downfall of Milošević, Karleuša has openly praised Zoran Đinđić for his progressive politics, but admitted that she recognized Đinđić's progressivism only after his 2003 assassination and that she had believed his opponents' propaganda prior to it. She also supported Čedomir Jovanović and was a guest on a panel organized by the Liberal Democratic Party in October 2010.

In the initial years of the governance of Aleksandar Vučić, Karleuša openly opposed his politics and supported the protests against him. However, she eventually ended up endorsing Vučić for the 2022 Serbian general election. Moreover, in November 2021, Karleuša supported the mining operation in the Jadar region proposed by Rio Tinto and the Serbian Government, in spite of the national protests against it due to its potentially hazardous effects on the environment. She also criticized the 2023 Serbian protests held as a result of the Belgrade school shooting and joined the counter rally organized by the ruling Serbian Progressive Party (SNS) on 27 May 2023. Also in regards to the 2023 protests, Karleuša faced scrutiny after she had criticized actors for taking part in the anti-government protests whilst starring in television series and movies financed by the publicly owned Telekom Srbija. Opposition member of the National Assembly, Đorđe Stanković, alleged that Karleuša would receive €1.5 million from Telekom for her forthcoming album and a talk show. In December 2023, Karleuša revealed that her support for Vučić came after he was "the only one" who helped her with her mother's cancer treatment. According to Jelena Manojlović of Nova.rs, Karleuša was paid around €300,000 in total from the city budgets of Požarevac, Šabac, Ruma, Sombor, Subotica, Kikinda and Kraljevo for her public concerts in those cities, which were held from July to September 2024 and which Manojlović claimed were organized due to Karleuša's support for the ruling SNS. Irena Dedakin, also of Nova.rs, called Karleuša's "concert tour of city squares in Serbia" "an award for loyalty to the SNS regime". In December 2024, she announced her plans to run for President of Serbia following the end of Vučić's term, "despite believing that he should rule forever". During the same month, she criticized the 2024–2025 Serbian anti-corruption protests, initiated by university students following the Novi Sad railway station canopy collapse, claiming that she "advocates that university education in Serbia should no longer be free" and calling for the students' arrests and the professors' incarceration. On 15 August 2025, Karleuša's concert in Loznica was interrupted within an hour of commencing by the anti-government protesters. Due to the number of protesters being larger than those in attendance, the singer was forced to be de facto evacuated.

After the cancelation of her show in Podgorica due to her statement about Montenegrin ethnic identity ("Every Montenegrin's grandfather was a Serb"), Karleuša's Instagram account was mass reported and subsequently temporarily banned in May 2024. In November 2024, the Romanian Embassy in Belgrade condemned Karleuša for her statements about the Serbian politician Marinika Tepić, an ethnic Romanian. Karleuša's statements, in which she had been repeatedly pointing out Tepić's Romanian ethnicity and had implied that ethnic Serbs should be held to different standards than ethnic minorities, were also condemned by the Serbian Ministry of Human and Minority Rights and Social Dialogue, the Commissioner for Protection of Equality Brankica Janković and the European Movement Serbia, among others. The statements were described as "chauvinist" by N1 and Nova.rs, and as hate speech by N1 and Vijesti. On 4 August 2025, Karleuša expressed sympathies for the creation of a Greater Serbia on her X account. In August 2026, Karleuša's show at a nightclub in Vodice, Croatia, scheduled for 15 August, caused controversy. There were calls for a boycott of the event, including from the Mayor of Vodice Ante Cukrov, due to Karleuša's previous political statements, which included calling the Croatian language a "dialect of the Serbian language" and the public desire for "the same thing to happen" to Croatian citizens, which was interpreted as a desire for a canopy collapse in Croatia. The nightclub subsequently cancelled the show.

Despite initially expressing support for Palestine following the October 7 attacks and condemning the Israeli war crimes in the subsequent Gaza war, Karleuša later expressed "love" for Israel on 4 August 2025.

In the past, Karleuša had been critical of Bosnian Serb politician Milorad Dodik, drawing Dodik's ire after she supported the Justice for David movement, and criticized the Government, Police and Judiciary of Republika Srpska. However, on 27 July 2024, Karleuša flew from Banja Luka to Podgorica in a helicopter owned by the Government of Republika Srpska, whose president at the time was Dodik. After he was found guilty by the Court of Bosnia and Herzegovina of disobeying the decisions of the High Representative, Karleuša defended Dodik and condemned the verdict. Karleuša has also been critical of Serbian politicians Dragan "Palma" Marković and Vojislav Šešelj, as well as the Government of Croatia.

=== Legal issues ===
In 2010, Serbian singer Svetlana "Ceca" Ražnatović launched legal action against Karleuša for defamation after Karleuša had addressed Ceca in an open letter via Facebook, accusing her of maintaining close ties with the mafia, specifically the Zemun Clan, through connections from her late husband, Željko "Arkan" Ražnatović, and of being involved in the 2000 assassination of Karleuša's then-boyfriend, Zoran "Ćanda" Davidović. Furthermore, she addressed rumors of Ceca purposely creating bad publicity for Karleuša through her connections in the media and show business. In February 2017, Ceca claimed victory over Karleuša, who was fined with €650 and ordered to cover Ceca's €900 court expenses.

On 10 April 2018, Karleuša was interrogated under suspicion of spreading panic amidst the national measles epidemic, after she had publicly advocated for the freedom of choice when it comes to MMR vaccination. She explained that she based her views on personal experience with one of her daughters who, according to her, had a bad reaction following the vaccination. While publicly receiving her COVID-19 vaccine in May 2021, Karleuša accentuated that she is not "anti-vax" and encouraged Serbian people to also get vaccinated.

At the beginning of 2019, Serbian media started reporting on Karleuša having an affair with Bosnian soccer player Ognjen Vranješ, which she initially denied. The scandal subsequently erupted when nude photos of her started circulating the web and were eventually placed on the cover of every daily tabloid in Serbia. Furthermore, Karleuša's Twitter account was suspended after she posted private nude photos of Vranješ, which she claimed she had received from a female singer who had been involved with him. Due to her private life, between January and February 2019, Karleuša made 110 front-page headlines of the daily newspapers, where she was presented in a mostly negative light. Serbian Press Council publicly condemned tabloids for violating Serbian Codex of journalism, citing this incident as a prime example of the downfall of Serbian media scene in recent years. The State Secretary of the Ministry of Culture and Information, Aleksandar Gajović, declared on 16 January that the Ministry would submit infringement reports against Serbian tabloids Kurir, Informer, Alo! and Srpski telegraf for their sexually explicit front pages. Brankica Janković, the Commissioner for Protection of Equality, stated that tabloids continued breaking the Codex of journalism by promoting "belittling and insulting" content as well as gender stereotypes in spite of reprimands from the Ministry. Karleuša herself stated that she had initiated over 140 charges against Vranješ and mentioned newspapers for defamation and that all the proceeds from the lawsuits would go to charity. By the end of 2023, despite her initial denial of the adultery allegations, Karleuša looked back on the incident by describing it as her "online mistake". Karleuša created a new Twitter account in August 2023. On 16 December 2025, she admitted to the affair with Vranješ.

In June 2019, Karleuša verbally and physically assaulted the Kurir paparazzo Vladimir Šporčić who was taking photos of her while she was visiting her mother's grave at the Bežanija New Cemetery. Kurir released the video of the incident a day later. Šporčić subsequently filed a criminal complaint against Karleuša. The Third Basic Public Prosecutor's Office in Belgrade submitted an indictment to the court in March 2021; Karleuša was charged with the crime of "abuse and torture". Karleuša sampled the voice of a news anchor reading a report about the Prosecutor's Office indictment submission in her 2023 "KarlyB*tch" music video, as well as the Alpha album track "KarlyB*tch 2".

== In popular culture ==
Karleuša has been referenced, portrayed, and discussed in various popular media domestically and internationally.

- Elements of Karleuša's image have been discussed in academic and cultural writing. Her 2008 music video for "Slatka mala", which features male performers in drag, has been analyzed in studies of gender performance, queer aesthetics and turbo-folk culture in the Balkans.
- In 2015, Karleuša was discussed on The Wendy Williams Show, mostly due to her accusations that Kim Kardashian and Beyoncé had copied her style and wardrobe.
- In 2015, footage from Karleuša's 2013 Viva La Diva concert at Ušće in Belgrade was used in the documentary film Amy, where it was presented as footage from Amy Winehouse's final concert at Kalemegdan Fortress. In early 2016, Karleuša stated that the footage had been used without her authorization and announced plans to pursue legal action against the filmmakers. She later abandoned the planned lawsuit, citing her late respect for the singer.
- In 2016, Karleuša was featured on Kim Kardashian's web blog Woman Crush Wednesday, in which Kardashian addressed the controversy surrounding alleged similarities between their fashion styles and expressed admiration for Karleuša's style.
- In 2018, she appeared in Coby's music video for "HMoschino", produced in connection with the H&M and Moschino collaboration.
- In 2018, a demo recording song from Jala Brat and Buba Corelli titled "Illuminati" leaked online, featuring references to Karleuša, and where Karleuša was supposed to be a feature. The song was never officially released.
- In March 2024, Karleuša made a cameo appearance with Winnie Harlow and Georgina Rodríguez on Rodríguez's Netflix documentary I Am Georgina. They both walked together on the runway for the fashion brand Vetements at Paris Fashion Week.
- On the Serbian singing show Tvoje lice zvuči poznato (Serbian iteration of the Your Face Sounds Familiar franchise), Karleuša was portrayed multiple times by Sneki, Dara Bubamara and Jana Šušteršič in Slovenia.
- In 2024, Karleuša was portrayed by drag queen Plane Jane on the 16th season of American reality competition television series RuPaul's Drag Race, winning the Snatch Game challenge with her impersonation.
- In 2025, Karleuša made a brief cameo appearance of Iranian-Dutch singer Sevdaliza's music video for "Maria Magdalena", from her third studio album Heroina.

== Discography ==
Studio albums

- Ogledalce (1995)
- Ženite se momci (1996)
- Veštice, vile (1997)
- Jelena (1998)
- Gili, gili (1999)
- Za svoje godine (2001)
- Samo za tvoje oči (2002)
- Magija (2005)
- JK Revolution (2008)
- Diva (2012)
- Alpha (2023)
- Omega (2023)
- Enigma (2026)

== Awards and nominations ==
Awards and nominations of Jelena Karleuša
Award	Year	Category	Nominee/work	Result	Ref.
Oskar Popularnosti	1999	Album of the Year	Gili, gili	Won	
Oskar Popularnosti	2001	Performer of the year	Herself	Won	
Oskar Popularnosti	2004	Female Performer of the Year	Herself	Won	
Oskar Popularnosti	2005	Album of the Year	Magija	Won	
Oskar Popularnosti	2008	Album of the Year	JK Revolution	Won	
Oskar Popularnosti	2012	Female Folk Singer of the Year	Herself	Nominated^{1}	
Music Awards Ceremony	2019	Collaboration of the Year	"Bankina"	Won	
Music Awards Ceremony	2020	Trap Collaboration of the Year	"LaJK"	Won	

1. Karleuša asked her fans purposely not to vote for her, because in her opinion she can't be labelled as a "folk" singer.
