= Boginja =

Boginja may refer to:

- Boginja, a 1987 album by Croatian pop-rock singer Josipa Lisac
- Boginja, a 2016 album by Serbian turbo-folk singer Milica Pavlović
