= List of number-one singles of 2022 (Croatia) =

This is a list of the Croatian number-one singles of 2022 as compiled by Croatia Songs, part of Hits of the World Billboard chart series, provided by Billboard.

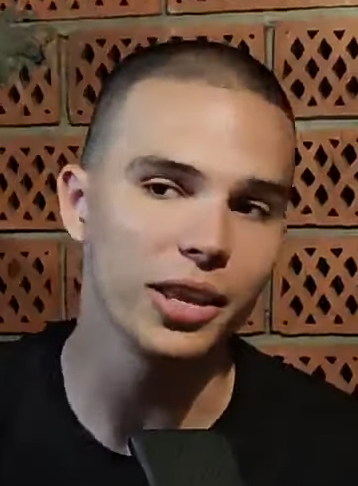
Voyage spent a record eleven weeks in total at the top of the chart, having reached the number-one position with "Gad", "Tango" and "London".

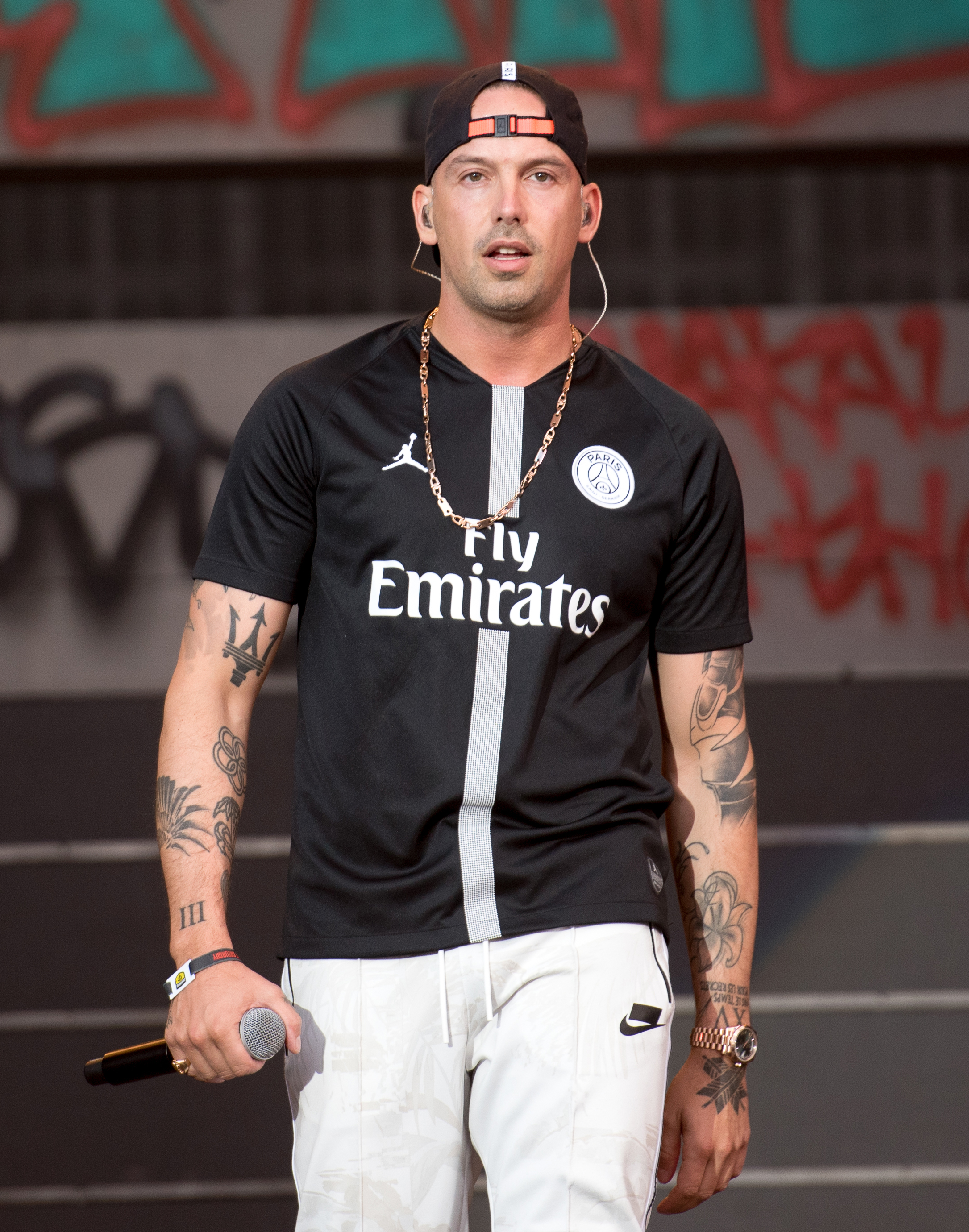
RAF Camora is the first artist from outside the former Yugoslavia to reach the number-one position, having done so with "Criminal".

Number-one singles, showing issue date, song and artist names
No.	Issue date	Song	Artist(s)	Ref.
1	19 February 2022	"Behute"	Senidah	
1	26 February 2022	"Behute"	Senidah	
1	5 March 2022	"Behute"	Senidah	
1	12 March 2022	"Behute"	Senidah	
2	19 March 2022	"In corpore sano"	Konstrakta	
2	26 March 2022	"In corpore sano"	Konstrakta	
3	2 April 2022	"Crno oko"	Nucci	
4	9 April 2022	"Criminal"	Jala Brat, Buba Corelli and RAF Camora	
5	16 April 2022	"Nyokosuzi"	Inas	
5	23 April 2022	"Nyokosuzi"	Inas	
5	30 April 2022	"Nyokosuzi"	Inas	
5	7 May 2022	"Nyokosuzi"	Inas	
5	14 May 2022	"Nyokosuzi"	Inas	
6	21 May 2022	"Gad"	Voyage and Nucci	
6	28 May 2022	"Gad"	Voyage and Nucci	
6	4 June 2022	"Gad"	Voyage and Nucci	
6	11 June 2022	"Gad"	Voyage and Nucci	
6	18 June 2022	"Gad"	Voyage and Nucci	
7	25 June 2022	"Tango"	Voyage	
7	2 July 2022	"Tango"	Voyage	
8	9 July 2022	"Provereno"	Milica Pavlović	
8	16 July 2022	"Provereno"	Milica Pavlović	
9	23 July 2022	"Martini"	Henny	
9	30 July 2022	"Martini"	Henny	
9	6 August 2022	"Martini"	Henny	
9	13 August 2022	"Martini"	Henny	
10	20 August 2022	"Warsaw"	Jala Brat and Buba Corelli	
11	27 August 2022	"Coco"	Jala Brat and Buba Corelli	
11	3 September 2022	"Coco"	Jala Brat and Buba Corelli	
11	10 September 2022	"Coco"	Jala Brat and Buba Corelli	
11	17 September 2022	"Coco"	Jala Brat and Buba Corelli	
11	24 September 2022	"Coco"	Jala Brat and Buba Corelli	
12	1 October 2022	"LaMelo"	Jala Brat and Buba Corelli	
13	8 October 2022	"Omađijan"	Sanja Vučić	
13	15 October 2022	"Omađijan"	Sanja Vučić	
14	22 October 2022	"Karneval"	Sajfer	
15	29 October 2022	"London"	Voyage and Elena Kitić	
15	5 November 2022	"London"	Voyage and Elena Kitić	
15	12 November 2022	"London"	Voyage and Elena Kitić	
re	19 November 2022	"Karneval"	Sajfer	
16	26 November 2022	"Kalaši"	Zera	
16	3 December 2022	"Kalaši"	Zera	
16	10 December 2022	"Kalaši"	Zera	
17	17 December 2022	"Đerdan"	Sanja Vučić and Nucci	
17	24 December 2022	"Đerdan"	Sanja Vučić and Nucci	
17	31 December 2022	"Đerdan"	Sanja Vučić and Nucci	

== Number-one artists of 2022 ==
List of number-one artists by total weeks at number one
Position	Artist	Weeks at No. 1
1	Voyage	10
2	Nucci	9
3	Jala Brat	8
3	Buba Coreli	8
5	Inas	5
5	Sanja Vučić	5
7	Henny	4
7	Senidah	4
9	Elena Kitić	3
9	Zera	3
12	Konstrakta	2
12	Milica Pavlović	2
12	Sajfer	2
12	Breskvica	2
12	Teodora	2
17	RAF Camora	1

== See also ==
- List of number-one albums of 2022 (Croatia)
