= Jadranka Barjaktarović =

Montenegrin singer (1981)

- Born: 11 October 1981 (age 44); Ivangrad, Montenegro, Yugoslavia
- Origin: Berane, Montenegro
- Genres: Folk-pop
- Occupation: Singer
- Instrument: Vocals
- Years active: 2005–present
- Labels: Grand Production; City Records

Jadranka Barjaktarović (born 11 October 1981) is a Montenegrin singer. Between 2020 and 2021, she had several controversial performances that were met with numerous condemnations and criticisms in Serbia, the Republika Srpska and a part of the Montenegrin public.

== Biography ==
Barjaktarović was born in the town of Berane, where she grew up and completed primary and secondary education. In 2005, Barjaktarović finished third place in the second season of Zvezde Granda. Two years later, she won the first prize at the festival in Cetinje with the song "Tvoja noć i moja zora" (lit. 'Your Night and My Dawn'). In 2009, Barjaktarović released her first album under Grand Production titled Krv sam tvoja (lit. 'I am your blood'). Apart from releasing six songs within the album, there were also "Laka" (lit. 'Light'), "Neotporna" (lit. 'Irresistible'), and "Tvoja noć i moja zora" (lit. 'Your Night and My Dawn').

In September 2020, Barjaktarović gained public attention after she covered a song by Serbian singer Mitar Mirić at a performance in Podgorica titled "Ne može nam niko ništa" (lit. 'Nobody can do anything to us'), with reworked title and lyrics "Ne može nam niko ništa, jači smo od Srbije" (lit. 'Nobody can do anything to us, we are stronger than Serbia'). After the performance, a large number of singers and media from Montenegro and Serbia condemned her performance.

In June 2021, she performed a song "Sude mi" by Miroslav Škoro and Marko Perković Thompson which glorifies Croatian war general Ante Gotovina.

== Discography ==
=== Albums ===
- Krv sam tvoja (2009)

=== Singles ===
- Lude godine (2011)
- Boli me (2011)
- Dupla s čemerom (2012)
- Fatalna (duet with Sha) (2012)
- Prsten (2013)
- Deja vu (2013)
- Mambo (2014)
- Vrijeme da se volimo (2014)
- Biser Crne Gore (2014)
- Očajna (2015)
- Idemo na more (duet with Rubini) (2015)
- Kad ljubav zaplače (2016)
- Zbog tebe (duet with Bane Ivić) (2016)
- Luzeru (2017)
- Pile moje (duet with Dijamanti bend) (2018)
- Urgentni centar (2018)
- Crna Gora je moj dom (2021)

=== Festivals ===
- 2007. Festival Cetinje - Tvoja noć i moja zora - first prize
- 2008. Grand Festival - Kad tela su vrela
- 2010. Grand Festival - Moj živote, moja tugo
- 2012. Grand Festival - Dupla s čemerom
- 2014. Grand Festival - Linija nadanja
- 2015. Pink Music Fest - Očajna
