= Posesivna =

2022 studio album by Milica Pavlvović

Studio album by Milica Pavlović
- Released: 11 April 2022
- Genre: Pop
- Length: 50:03
- Label: Senorita Music

Milica Pavlović chronology
Grand dame 3 (2020)	Posesivna (2022)	Lav (2023)

Singles from Posesivna
- 1. "Crna jutra (Balkan S&M)" Released: 7 February 2021; 2. "Oko moje" Released: 3 August 2021; 3. "Dabogda propao" Released: 21 September 2021

Posesivna (transl. Possessive) is the fourth studio album by Serbian singer Milica Pavlović. It was released on 11 April 2022 through Pavlović's independent record label Senorita Music in distribution deal with Telekom Srbija. The album features twelve new tracks and three previously released singles: "Oko moje" featuring Saša Matić, "Dabogda propao" and "Crna jutra (Balkan S&M)". Although generally categorized as a pop record, Posesivna also includes influences from turbo-folk, electronic and dance music.

== Commercial performance ==
Posesivna was sold in 10,000 copies. Upon the album's release, tracks "Posesivna", "Šećeru" featuring Albino and "Provereno" entered the Billboard's Croatia Songs chart, with the lattermost topping the chart in the week of 9 July 2022. Posesivna also earned the Album of the Year Award at the 2023 Music Awards Ceremony, held on 26 January 2023.

== Track listing ==
Posesivna track listing
No.	Title	Lyrics	Music	Arrangement	Length
1.	"Posesivna bivša"	Ljiljana Jorgovanović; Vladimir Uzelac	Uzelac	Atelje Trag	3:46
2.	"15ica"	Jorgovanović; Nikola Kirćanski; Premil Jovanović; Relja Milanković; Slobodan Veljković	Veljković	Coby	2:56
3.	"Ne dam krevet"	Jorgovanović	Evangelos-Phoebus Tassopoulos	Phoebus; Bojan Vasić	3:16
4.	"Nema žene"	Saša Lazić	Lazić	Aca Krsmanović	2:49
5.	"After kod Milice"	Uzelac	Uzelac	Atelje Trag	3:08
6.	"Mala s Himalaja"	Aleksandra Radović	Petar Šarenac	Nikki Caneras	2:59
7.	"Šećeru" (featuring Albino)	Andrijano Kadović	Stjepan Jelica	Lowend	3:16
8.	"Tačno tako"	Jorgovanović; Uzelac	Tassopoulos	Atelje Trag	3:28
9.	"Striptizete"	Jorgovanović	Lazić	Atelje Trag	3:59
10.	"Provereno"	Dragan Brajović	Dejan Kostić	Kostić	3:33
11.	"Riba de luxe"	Marina Tucaković; Milan Radulović; Uzelac	Doron Medalie; Omri Segal; Chen Aharoni; Noa Kirel	Medalie; Segal; Aharoni; Kirel	2:46
12.	"Suzo"	Kadović; Jorgovanović	Jelica	Albino; Atelje Trag	2:38
13.	"Oko moje" (featuring Saša Matić)	Miloš Roganović	Roganović	Roganović; Alek Aleksov	3:58
14.	"Dabogda propao"	Jorgovanović	Alen Stajić; Marko Peruničić; Nebojša Arežina	Stajić; Atelje Trag	4:08
15.	"Crna jutra (Balkan S&M)"	Jorgovanović; Uzelac	Uzelac	Atelje Trag	3:17
Total length:					50:03

Notes

- "Ne dam krevet" is a Serbian-language cover of "Na ti hairesai" ("Να τη χαίρεσαι"; 2004), written by Phoebus, as performed by Despina Vandi.
- "Riba de luxe" is a Serbian-language cover of "Hatzuf" ("חצוף"; 2019), written by Noa Kirel, Omri Segal, Doron Medalie and Chen Aharoni, as performed by Kirel.

== Personnel ==
=== Musicians ===
- Milica Pavlović - lead vocals
- Suzana Branković - background vocals (1, 3, 4, 5, 6, 7, 9, 10, 11)
- Anđela Despotović - background vocals (2)
- Ksenija Milošević - background vocals (8, 12)
- Ivana Selakov - background vocals (13)
- Dejan Kostić - background vocals, guitar, keyboards (10, 13)
- Bane Kljajić - flamenco guitar (1)
- Nenad Gajin - guitar (1, 9)
- Ištvan Mađarić - guitar (4)
- Petar Trumbetaš - guitar, bouzouki (4, 13)
- Stjepan Jelica - guitar (7)
- Vasilije Čolan - guitar (7)
- Mladen Pecović - bouzouki (10)
- Marko Kojadinović - kaval, clarinet (13)
- Aleksandar Aleksov - bass, keyboards (13)

=== Technical ===
- Atelje Trag - arrangement, mixing (1, 3, 5, 6, 8, 9, 12, 14, 15)
- Lazar Milić - mastering, mixing (1, 3, 4, 5, 9, 10, 12)
- Jan Magdevski - mastering, mixing (2)
- Slobodan Veljković Coby - arrangement (2)
- Phoebus - arrangement (3)
- Aca Krsmanović - arrangement (4)
- Petar Šarenac - arrangement (6)
- Lowend - arrangement, mastering (7)
- Jhinsen - mixing (7)
- OONDA - mixing, mastering (7)
- Stjepan Jelica Albino - arrangement (7, 12)
- Saša Dinić - mastering (11)
- Doron Medalie - arrangement (11)
- Omri Segal - arrangement (11)
- Chen Aharoni - arrangement (11)
- Noa Kirel - arrangement (11)
- Aleksandar Aleksov - arrangement (13)
- Miloš Roganović - arrangement (13)
- Alen Stajić - arrangement (14)

=== Art ===
- Jasmin Đenčić - creative director
- Dušan Petrović - photography

== Release history ==
Release history for Posesivna
Region	Date	Format	Label
Serbia	11 April 2022	CD; USB flash drive	Senorita Music; Telekom Srbija
Various	12 April 2022	digital download; streaming	Senorita Music; Telekom Srbija
