= Alpha (Jelena Karleuša album) =

Studio album by Jelena Karleuša
- Released: 13 August 2023
- Recorded: 2022–2023
- Studio: Atelje Trag
- Genre: Electropop; hyperpop; hip-hop
- Length: 27:14
- Language: Serbian, English
- Label: JK Entertainment; Virgin
- Producer: Atelje Trag

Jelena Karleuša chronology
Music Week (Live) (2022)	Alpha (2023)	Omega (2023)

Singles from Alpha
- 1. "Mashallah" Released: 15 September 2023; 2. "KarlyB*tch" Released: 29 September 2023; 3. "Benga" Released: 26 August 2024

Alpha (also referred to as Alfa, stylized in all caps) is the eleventh studio album by the Serbian singer Jelena Karleuša, released on August 13, 2023 by JK Entertainment and distributed by Virgin Music. This is Karleuša's first studio album after 11 years since the release of her previous album Diva in 2012.

== Background ==
Karleuša released her previous studio album Diva in 2012. The following year, she released the single "Ferrari" together with Teča and Nesh, and also held her second major solo concert Viva La Diva, which was met with a barrage of criticism. Another song, allegedly titled "Welcome to Belgrade" and featuring Teča and Nesh, was supposed to be released before the concert. During a 2014 guest appearance on Prva TV show Exkluziv, a new single was announced and a short snippet was played. In 2015, Karleuša confirmed that she was working on a single featuring Serbian rapper Sajsi MC. The song was titled "Lokal Beogradizam" (Local Belgradism), but it was scrapped after Sajsi MC had collaborated with Croatian singer Severina. A demo version of the song was leaked onto Twitter and YouTube in 2017. In 2015, another single was planned, a collaboration with Greek duo Bang La Decks; it, however, never materialised.

In 2015, the singer took the judging chair in the musical talent show Zvezde Granda (Grand Stars). In 2016, speculations of a collaboration among Karleuša and Bosnian rappers Buba Corelli and Jala Brat appeared in Serbian media. The song was allegedly called "Balkan Illuminati", but was never released. The demo of the song was leaked onto Twitter by Karleuša herself, after Corelli had insulted the singer on Instagram. In 2017, Karleuša returned to the music scene with two successful singles: "O.S.T.A.V.LJ.A.M.T.E." (I.A.M.L.E.A.V.I.N.G.Y.O.U.), recorded with Bulgarian singer Azis, and "Bankina" (Curb), recorded with Serbian singer Aca Lukas. In 2018, Karleuša was featured on Serbian band Miligram's single "Marihuana", and announced another track, titled "XY". In 2019, Karleuša released the single "LaJK" (Like) featuring Serbian rapper Gazda Paja and shared a snippet of a collaboration with Lapsus Band via Instagram, titled "Pretvorilo se srce u kamen" (The Heart Turned Into Stone). In 2020, she released the live album Unplugged.

== Recording ==
In December 2020, Karleuša appeared on the program Šok-Tok (Shock-Flow), where she said that the new album would be released in the spring of 2021, and it would be called Alpha. In the same interview, the singer shared that she had been recording the album for the last three years. She also revealed details about the song "La Bomba" (The Bomb), snippets of which she shared earlier—the song was recorded in Spanglish with Brazilian drag queen Pabllo Vittar. In addition, Karleuša stated that the song was intended to represent Slovenia at the Eurovision Song Contest 2020, but at the last moment the singer refused. In January 2021, Bosnian singer Emir Aličković of Lapsus Band shared on his Instagram that he was working with Karleuša in the studio. In addition, it was actively discussed on the Internet that a collaboration with American rapper Cardi B could appear in the album; Karleuša herself did not refute this in any way, actively stating in an interview that she maintains friendly relations with her, Cardi B herself also showed activity on Instagram in relation to Karleuša.

Due to Karleuša's employment in the Zvezde Granda project, the album release was postponed to the summer of 2021, when her contract with the show should end. At the end of June, the singer confirmed that the album will be released exactly in the summer, she also added that the new songs are "absolute hits". Later, the album's release was postponed to autumn. The singer planned to premiere several new songs at the August Music Week festival in Ušće, but changed her mind, deciding to arrange a full-fledged advertising campaign for the album. The singer also confirmed that in addition to Pabllo Vittar, two more "major" foreign stars would appear in the album.

In November, Karleuša shared on social networks that she was preparing a surprise on 31 December, many assumed that this was the release date of the new album. In the same month, the singer posted a story on Instagram with a tracklist of thirteen songs, substituting letters of the song titles with full stops. Titles revealed were "Ja" (I) and "Abu Dhabi", with already hinted "La Bomba" and "Karly Bitch". It was also announced that Sajsi MC and Serbian lyricist Milan Radulović, son of Karleuša's late longtime collaborator Marina Tucaković, were working on the album. In December 2021, the singer said that the release of the album was postponed to 2022.

In November 2022, Radulović announced that he forbade Karleuša to perform his songs, Karleuša replied to him that his "two and a half songs" would not be included in the final tracklist of the album anyway. He also leaked the lyrics of the song "Runde" (Rounds) without Karleuša's permission. In December, the singer again confirmed that the album would be released in 2023, and that she expected to enter the international market with it. On 14 February 2023, the track "Koka roka" (The Chick Rocks), written by Radulović for Karleuša's album, was released by Serbian singer Dara Bubamara; Karleuša claimed she had gifted the song away "out of pity" and "because the lyrics weren't good enough to match other songs on the album". In August 2024, "Runde" was released by the girl group Hurricane, shortly after Karleuša's demo leaked online.

== Release and promotion ==
In June 2023, Karleuša finally announced that the album would be released on 13 August. On 9 August, banners announcing Karleuša's new album were posted all over Belgrade, Novi Sad and Niš.

Karleuša revealed the cover art for Alpha, made by Foxxatron, on her Instagram account on 11 August. She revealed the tracklist the next day, blurring out the artist featured on the only collaborative track "Mashallah". On the release day, Karleuša premiered the music video for the opening track "KarlyB*tch", featuring cameo appearances from Pavlović and Devito, and revealed that the rest of the album would be released at 20:00 CEST. Pavlović would later turn out to be the artist featured on "Mashallah".

On 17 August, Karleuša's 45th birthday, she made a surprise announcement that her twelfth studio album Omega, that she had worked on concurrently with Alpha, would be released on 20 August. She simultaneously shared its cover art. The album was released at 12:00 CEST, and featured guest appearances from Devito and DJ Hamida on the only collaborative track "Nepogrešivo" (Unmistakably). The album also featured the long anticipated track "La Bomba"; however, the final version was a solo track and not a collaboration with Vittar as expected. The duet version leaked in full on 22 August. According to Telegraf.rs, the track wasn't officially released due to Universal failing to make a deal with Vittar's Brazilian label. The same night, the Belgrade Tower was lit up with Karleuša's initials in neon green colour, and an official promotional event was held at the rooftop of the Galerija Belgrade shopping mall. Karleuša's outfits for the event were compared by Showbuzz.hr to those of Madonna and Lady Gaga.

On 3 September, Karleuša announced a free entry special concert at the Belgrade Waterfront. On 15 September, she announced that the guests at the concert would be Pavlović, Devito and Alpha's songwriters Mimi Mercedez, Sajsi MC and Nemanja Antonić.

== Controversies ==
In the beginning of August, Karleuša's YouTube channel was shut down. Nova S reported that the reason for the shutdown was a lawsuit from Serbian composer Aleksandar "Futa" Radulović, the husband of Marina Tucaković and the father of Milan Radulović, both of whom had worked on Alpha and Omega and both of whom had died within two years before their release. Futa claimed that his legal team had shut down the channel due to the copyright abuse, and that Karleuša wouldn't be Tucaković's only collaborator whose channel would be shut down. Karleuša stated for Telegraf.rs that her legal team was dealing with the issue and that she wouldn't speak out about it anymore, expressing disappointment with Futa, as she was Tucaković's close personal friend. Karleuša's manager Zoran Birtašević revealed on Twitter that the track "Runde" was scrapped from Alpha due to Futa.

Another controversial aspect of the release was that the albums were sponsored by Telekom Srbija. According to the National Assembly member Đorđe Stanković, Karleuša received €1.5 million from Telekom in exchange for loyalty to the regime of President Aleksandar Vučić. Birtašević denied Stanković's claims, while Telekom and Karleuša herself remained silent. Karleuša was vocal about her opposition to Vučić, his Serbian Progressive Party (SNS) and the regime media, before shockingly endorsing him ahead of the 2022 Serbian general election. She faced harsh criticism after she had appeared on RTV Pink's show Hit Tvit and dismissed the 2023 Serbian protests against the Government, which had been triggered by the Belgrade school shooting. On 18 August, Danas published a political cartoon of Karleuša breastfeeding Vučić, made by Predrag "Corax" Koraksić. The cartoon was criticized by Miloš Vučević, the Minister of Defence and the president of the SNS, who dubbed it "promotion of hatred" and "an insult to mothers and women". On 20 August, Karleuša wrote on Twitter that she filed lawsuits against journalists of N1, Nova S and Danas. Furthermore, Nova S reporters were banned from entering the event at Galerija Belgrade. Karleuša denied Stanković's claims on 11 September by mocking them on Twitter.

== Track listings ==
No.	Title	Lyrics	Music	Producer(s)	Length
1.	"KarlyB*tch"	Milena Janković	Jelena Karleuša; Marko Peruničić; Nebojša Arežina	Atelje Trag	2:17
2.	"Benga"	Pavle Bošković	Karleuša; Peruničić; Arežina	Atelje Trag	2:58
3.	"Block!"	Ivana Rašić	Karleuša; Peruničić; Arežina	Atelje Trag	2:35
4.	"Mashallah" (featuring Milica Pavlović)	Karleuša; Peruničić; Rašić	Karleuša; Peruničić; Arežina; Nemanja Antonić	Atelje Trag	2:28
5.	"Alien"	Ljiljana Jorgovanović; Karleuša; Janković	Bojan Vasić; Karleuša; Peruničić; Arežina	Atelje Trag	2:51
6.	"Karma"	Janković; Branko Kljaić	Karleuša; Peruničić; Arežina	Atelje Trag	2:29
7.	"Takita"	Rašić; Karleuša; Peruničić	Karleuša; Peruničić; Arežina	Atelje Trag	2:56
8.	"Rehabilitacija"	Ivan Vukajlović	Antonić	Atelje Trag	3:38
9.	"Lucifer"	Bošković	Karleuša; Peruničić; Arežina; Antonić	Atelje Trag	2:25
10.	"KarlyB*tch 2"	Janković; Peruničić	Karleuša; Peruničić; Arežina	Atelje Trag	2:37
Total length:					27:14

Notes

- "KarlyB*tch" and "KarlyB*tch 2" are stylized in all caps.

== Personnel ==
- Music, lyrics, lead vocal and styling – Jelena Karleuša
- Executive producer, project direction, music distribution, production designer, creative direction, cover/overall design – Zoran Birtašević
- All music, lyrics, all arrangements, mix, recording – Nebojša Arežina and Marko Peruničić (Atelje Trag)
- Lyrics – Ljiljana Jorgovanović, Sajsi MC, Mimi Mercedez, Fox, Gazda Paja, Ivan Vukajlović
- Lead vocalist – Milica Pavlović
- Backing vocals – Jelena Đurić, Suzana Branković, Miloš Radovanović
- Mastering – Lazar Milić Laki
- Visuals – NN Media Team
- Photography, cover – Foxxarton, Miloš Miletić
- Visuals, photo DOP – Dasha Grafova, Leanda Jade Heler
- Visuals, SFX, Special Event producer – Saška Karać, De-Yan
- Make up – Dragan Vurdelja
- Hair – Dimitrije Vokić, Matija Radulović
- Costume – Žaklina Marjanović, Marija Marković
- Legal, advisor, administration, campaign – Zlatan Kitanović
- Legal, organization, administration – Jovana Dakić
- Ad campaign – Aleksa Čokić

Credits are adapted from the album's digital booklet.

== Release history ==
List of regions, release dates, showing formats and label
Country	Date	Format	Label
Various	August 13, 2023	digital download; streaming	JK Entertainment; Virgin Music
Serbia	April 24, 2024	CD	JK Entertainment; City Records
