= Alibi (Milica Pavlović song) =

Single by Milica Pavlović

from the album Govor tela
- Released: 2 January 2014
- Genre: Pop
- Length: 3:10
- Label: Grand Production
- Songwriter(s): Vuksan Bilanović
- Producer(s): Atelje Trag

Milica Pavlović singles chronology
"Sexy Señorita" (2013)	"Alibi" (2014)	"Alter ego" (2014)

Nesh singles chronology
"Ferrari" (2013)	"Alibi" (2014)	"Od vikenda do vikenda" (2015)

"Alibi" is a song recorded by Serbian pop recording artist Milica Pavlović featuring rapper Nesh which served as the fourth single from her debut studio album Govor tela. The video and song were originally planned to premiere on the 22 December 2013 episode of the television show Narod pita, but the release was delayed until 2 January 2014. The lyrics were written by Vuksan Bilanović, with music by Atelje Trag.

The music video was filmed in December 2013 at a cost of €20,000. It premiered the same day as the song.
