= Sajsi MC =

Serbian rapper and singer (born 1981)

Sajsi MC Сајси Ем-Си
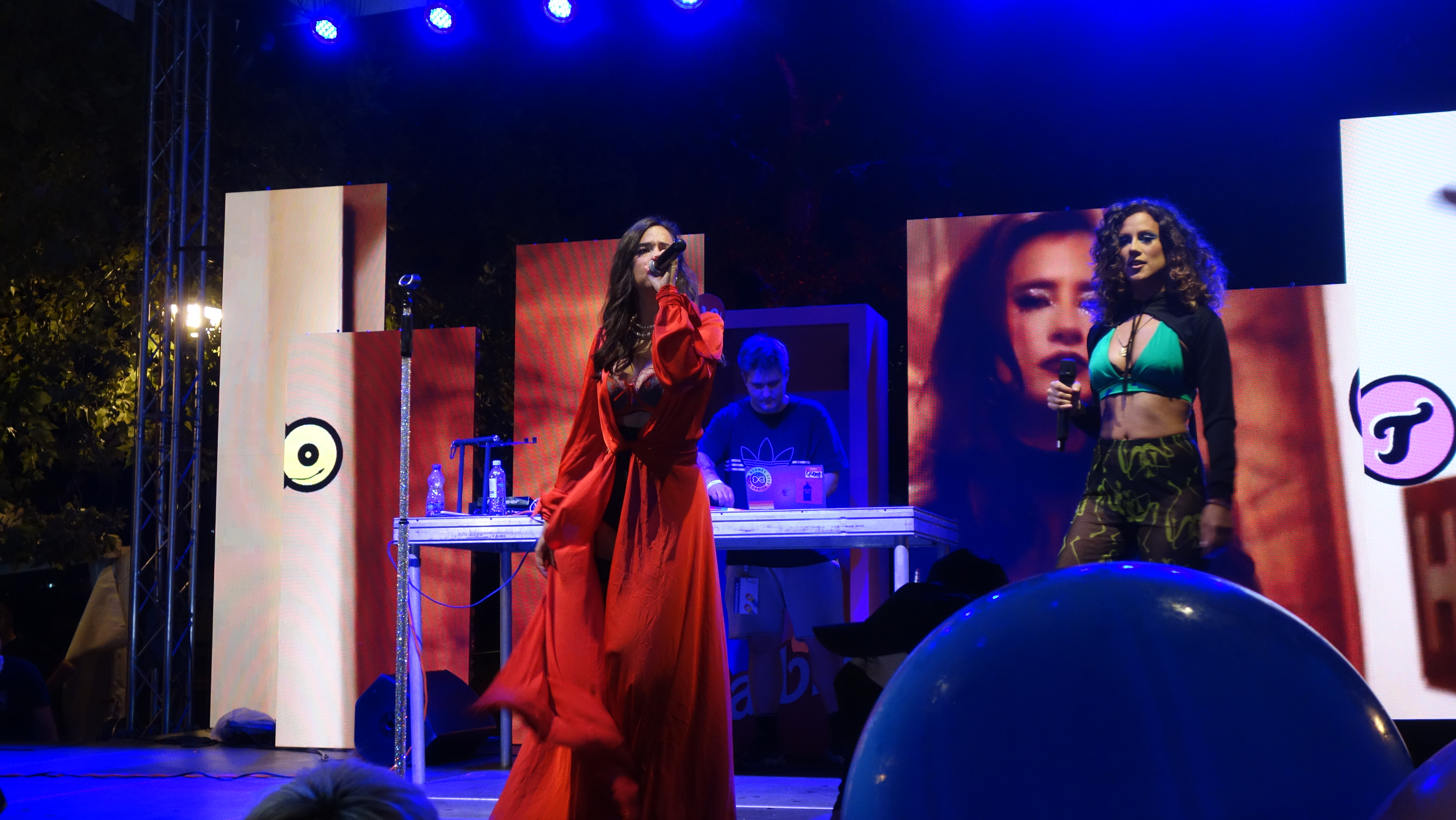
- Sajsi MC (left) and Tijara (right) performing at the 2021 Belgrade Pride

Background information
- Born: Ivana Rašić; 12 October 1981 (age 44); Belgrade, SR Serbia, SFR Yugoslavia
- Genres: Hip-hop; pop-rap; electronic
- Occupations: Rapper; lyricist; poetess
- Instruments: Vocals
- Years active: 2002–present
- Labels: Multimedia Music; IDJTunes
- Spouse: Marko Trmčić (m. 2021)

Ivana Rašić Trmčić (Serbian Cyrillic: Ивана Рашић Трмчић; born 12 October 1981), known professionally as Sajsi MC (Serbian: Сајси Ем-Си / Sajsi Em-Si), is a Serbian rapper, lyricist and poetess. Recognized as one of the most prominent female rappers in Serbia, her lyrics explore sexuality, feminism and other socio-political subjects. Her best-known songs include "Mama" (2011), "Nadrkano hodanje" (2014) and "Fux Deluxe" (2024). She has written songs for other artists such as Jelena Karleuša and Senidah.

== Early life ==
Ivana Rašić was born in Belgrade on 12 October 1981 and grew up in Zaječar, where she lived until she was 19. Her father, Jovan Rašić, is a dentist and the founder and lead singer of the popular Yugoslavian jazz rock band Generacija 5. Her mother is from Obrenovac. Her younger sister Tijana, professionally known as Tijara, often collaborates with Sajsi.

Rašić stated that she did not show an interest in music during her childhood, unlike her sister, and she only started writing lyrics during her university years.

== Career ==
Rašić debuted at a rap festival in the Belgrade night club Barutana in 2002. Initially, Sajsi MC was a collective, which existed between 2005 and 2009. The name of their act is Šatrovački slang for oral sex. In 2010, Sajsi pursued a solo career under the same stage name by releasing her album Daleko je Dizni under Multimedia Music. The following year, she saw widespread mainstream attention after she had released the song "Mama" featuring Damjan Eltech in May 2011. The fictional character of a "shallow and materialistic" high school girl named Tiffany, which Sajsi portrayed in the song, was negatively commented by musical critics on Radio Television of Serbia, failing to recognize the satire behind it.

In July 2014, Sajsi collaborated with DJ B.K.O. on EP Pokvarenica, which produced her stand-out hit "Nadrkano hodanje". In 2016, Sajsi released a duet with Croatian singer Severina, titled "Silikoni". The song was written by Rašić and Marina Tucaković. Actress Seka Sablić starred in the music video. To promote the single, Sajsi MC joined Severina on stage for her concert at Guča Trumpet Festival, becoming the first rap artist to perform there. In January 2018, Sajsi and DJ BKO released album Rad, rad i samo bleja.

In May 2021, Sajsi MC released a reissue of her 2010 album Daleko je Dizni. The following May, album Kardinalna was released. The track "Ringe jaja" from the album won the best rap song at the 2023 Music Awards Ceremony. In October 2024, Kardinalna was followed by the album Mater, a collaboration with the producer A.N.D.R., which spawned the hit single "Fux Deluxe". Rašić published a book of poetry, titled Šta žulja zgrade? (What Bugs Buildings?), in February 2026.

Sajsi MC was a lyricist on Jelena Karleuša's 2023 album Alpha. She also wrote "Lanci ljubavi" and co-wrote "Da li ti nedostajem?" for Senidah's 2025 album Sen i dah. She also wrote all the lyrics for Senidah's 2026 EP U meni je sunce.

Over the years, Sajsi MC has performed at larger regional music festivals such as EXIT, Sea Dance Festival, Belgrade Beer Fest, Arsenal Fest and Guča Trumpet Festival.

== Public image ==
Recognized as an ally to the LGBT+ community in Serbia, she was announced as the "godmother" of the 2022 Belgrade Pride, which was also the host of that year's EuroPride event.

In October 2022, she was also featured in an UN Women campaign against gender-based violence in Serbia.

== Personal life ==
In 2017, she graduated from the Faculty of Political Sciences at the University of Belgrade with a bachelor's degree in international relations. In August 2021, Rašić married punk musician Marko Trmčić. On 25 January 2023, during the Music Awards Ceremony, she revealed her pregnancy. On 12 March 2023, Rašić gave birth to a daughter.

== Discography ==
Studio albums

- Misi nači naaš (2009); as Sajsi MC band
- Daleko je Dizni (2010)
- Od dvanaest do šest (2012); feat. Damjan Eltech
- Rad, rad i samo bleja (2018)
- Kardinalna (2022)
- Mater (2024)

EPs

- KNVK (2012)
- Pokvarenica (2014)
- IVANARASHIC (2023)

== Bibliography ==
Poetry

- Sajsi MC (2026). Šta žulja zgrade?. Laguna. ISBN 978-86-521-6071-6.

== Awards and nominations ==
Year	Award	Category	Nominee/work	Result	Ref.
2020	Music Awards Ceremony	Alternative Pop Song of the Year	"Meni se ne udaje"	Nominated	
2021	Adria Muzzik Video Awards	Hip-hop Music Video of the Year	"Yugo dete"	Won	
2023	Music Awards Ceremony	Rap/Hip Hop Song of the Year	"Ringe jaja"	Won	
2023	Music Awards Ceremony	Album of the Year	Kardinalna	Nominated	
