= Georgina Rodríguez =

Argentine-Spanish model (born 1994)

- Georgina in 2026
- Born: Georgina Luisa Rodríguez Hernández; 27 January 1994 (age 32); Buenos Aires, Argentina
- Citizenship: Argentina; Spain
- Occupations: Social media personality; model; entrepreneur
- Years active: 2016–present
- Spouse: Cristiano Ronaldo (m. 2026)
- Children: 5
- Modelling information
- Hair colour: Black
- Eye colour: Brown
- Agency: Angels Project (Barcelona)

Georgina Luisa Rodríguez Hernández (born 27 January 1994) is an Argentine and Spanish social media personality, model, and entrepreneur. She rose to fame through her relationship with Portuguese footballer Cristiano Ronaldo, which earned her media attention and helped her build a social media following. She is the producer and subject of the 2022 Netflix reality television series I Am Georgina.

== Early life ==
Rodríguez was born in Buenos Aires, Argentina, to an Argentine father and a Spanish mother. She has a sister named Ivana Rodriguez, and a half-sister. Her father, Jorge Rodríguez, spent ten years in prison in Spain for drug trafficking. When Rodríguez was one year old, her mother moved the family from Argentina to the northern Spanish city of Jaca. Rodríguez studied ballet starting at the age of four, but stopped when she was a teenager because her family could not afford the lessons.

== Career ==
In her teens, Rodríguez worked as a retail assistant at the Spanish fashion label Massimo Dutti in San Sebastian. In 2016, while working as a sales assistant at a Gucci store in Madrid, she met Cristiano Ronaldo. She became famous after they began dating, and she built a career as a model and social media influencer. She has appeared in advertising campaigns for the American clothing brand Guess. (Note: Attributed to multiple references:) She has been on the covers of international editions of the magazines Vogue, Harper's Bazaar, and Elle, and has been featured in editorials. (Note: Attributed to multiple references:) In 2021, she launched the clothing brand OM by G. In 2024, she walked on the runway at a Vetements show at Paris Fashion Week, wearing a red dress with the number "7" that resembled Ronaldo's jerseys from his time at Manchester United, Real Madrid, and Juventus. In 2026, Rodríguez launched Mimoa, an activewear clothing line. She is the producer and subject of the Netflix reality television series I Am Georgina, which provides a behind-the-scenes look at her life, career, and family.

== Personal life ==
Rodríguez began dating Portuguese footballer Cristiano Ronaldo in the summer of 2016. The couple welcomed their first children, fraternal twins, via surrogacy in June 2017. Rodríguez became pregnant five months after the surrogate, and then gave birth to a baby girl in November 2017. (Note: Attributed to multiple references:) In 2021, Rodríguez became pregnant again with twins, a male and a female; the male reportedly died during childbirth and the female was born April 2022. On 11 August 2026, Rodríguez and Ronaldo were married in a civil ceremony in Cascais, Portugal after being engaged for approximately one year.
