= Lav (album) =

2023 studio album by Milica Pavlvović

Studio album by Milica Pavlović
- Released: 20 June 2023
- Genre: Pop-folk
- Length: 35:07
- Label: Senorita Music

Milica Pavlović chronology
Posesivna (2022)	Lav (2023)	Milijarda (2024)

Singles from Lav
- 1. "Venčanje" Released: 30 May 2023

Lav (Serbian Cyrillic: Лав, lit. 'Leo') is the fifth studio album by Serbian singer Milica Pavlović. It was released on 20 June 2023 independently through Senorita Music. The album was supported by its lead single "Venčanje", released on 30 May. Lav features a guest appearance by rapper and singer Coby. Lav was released digitally along with a limited shipping of 10,000 physical copies. To promote the album, Pavlović embarked on her first regional tour.

== Track listing ==
Lav track listing
No.	Title	Writer(s)	Producer(s)	Length
1.	"Lav"	Dejan Kostić; Ljiljana Jorgovanović	Kostić	2:44
2.	"Kučketina"	Vladimir Uzelac; Jorgovanović	Kostić	3:01
3.	"Jaša"	Evangelos-Phoebus Tassopoulos; Uzelac; Jorgovanović	Phoebus	3:26
4.	"Ne zovite me"	Kostić; Jorgovanović	Kostić	3:12
5.	"Kraljica prokletih"	Slobodan Veljković; Milena Janković; Nikola Kirćanski; Haris Rahmanović	Chika Benzika; Coby; Priki	2:33
6.	"Ilegala" (featuring Coby)	Veljković; Janković; Kirćanski; Petar Lugonja	Coby	3:06
7.	"Lake note"	Kostić; Dragan Brajović	Kostić	3:57
8.	"Na Zemlji Bog"	Kostić; Rade Rakazov	Kostić	3:02
9.	"Dajem godinu"	Jorgovanović; Uzelac	Uzelac	2:53
10.	"Venčanje"	Miloš Roganović	Roganović	3:22
11.	"Status quo" (Desire RMX)	Dušan Bačić	Dejan Nikolić	3:45
Total length:				35:07

== Lav Tour ==
To promote album Lav, Pavlović embarked on her first regional concert tour, which consisted of seven dates spanning between December 2023 and May 2025. The first show was held at the Belgrade Arena on December 23, 2023. The tour was documented in a five-part series, titled Lav: The Showrunner, which aired on TV Prva in June 2025.

Tour Dates
Date	City	Venue	Ref
23 December 2023	Belgrade, Serbia	Belgrade Arena	
15 June 2024	Novi Sad, Serbia	SPENS Hall	
21 June 2024	Zagreb, Croatia	Arena Zagreb	
15 November 2024	Laktaši, Bosnia and Herzegovina	Laktaši Sports Hall	
14 February 2025	Skopje, North Macedonia	Jane Sandanski Arena	
15 March 2025	Rijeka, Croatia	Centar Zamet	
10 May 2025	Sarajevo, Bosnia and Herzegovina	Skenderija	

== Release history ==
Release history for Posesivna
Region	Date	Format	Label
Serbia	20 June 2023	CD; USB flash drive	Senorita Music
Various	20 June 2023	digital download; streaming	Senorita Music
