= Supreme Court of Republika Srpska =

Court in Bosnia and Herzegovina

The Supreme Court of Republika Srpska (Serbian: Врховни суд Републике Српске, romanized: Vrhovni sud Republike Srpske) is the court of last resort in Republika Srpska. The Supreme Court of Republika Srpska was established on the basis of Article 135 of the Constitution of Republika Srpska, by a decision of the National Assembly on 12 August 1992.
