= Vidovdan (song) =

Song by Gordana Lazarević

from the album Vidovdan
- Released: 1989
- Genre: Serbian folk
- Length: 3:30
- Songwriter: Milutin Popović - Zahar

Audio sample
- file; help

"Vidovdan" (Serbian: Видовдан) is the name of a Serb folk song that was written by Milutin Popović known by his stage name Zahar and featured on the 1989 album with the same name of Gordana Lazarević, a singer from Serbia.

Vidovdan is one of the most important religious holidays of the Serbs, Serbian Orthodox Church and Serbia, as it is of great a historical importance because of the Battle of Kosovo which was fought between Medieval Serbia and the invading Ottoman Empire on June 28, 1389. The lyrics refer to the battle and Serbs of Kosovo.

The album which contains the song, also Vidovdan, was released in 1989, the year of the 600th anniversary of the Battle of Kosovo.

== See also ==
- Serbian music
