= Dejan Matić =

Serbian folk singer (born 1978)

- Дејан Матић
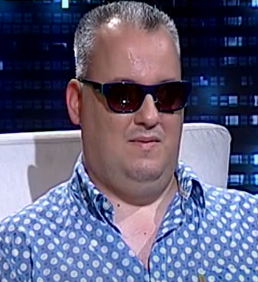
- Matić in 2016
- Born: 26 April 1978 (age 47); Bihać, SR Bosnia and Herzegovina, Yugoslavia
- Occupation: Singer
- Years active: 2002–present
- Spouse: Jelena Ristić (m. 2012)
- Children: 2
- Relatives: Saša Matić (brother)
- Musical career
- Genres: Pop-folk, Pop, Folk
- Instrument: vocals
- Label: Grand Production

Dejan Matić (Serbian Cyrillic: Дејан Матић; born 26 April 1978) is a Serbian folk music singer. He is the twin brother of fellow singer Saša Matić.

== Early life ==
Dejan Matić was born in Bihać, Bosnia and Herzegovina, the son of Zoran and Dragica. He and his twin brother Aleksandar "Saša" were born prematurely and had a difficult first few weeks of life, having to be placed in incubators in a Zagreb maternity hospital. For unknown reasons, both babies became completely blind only days after birth. The family relocated to Belgrade in 1982, when the brothers were four years of age. It was in Belgrade that they attended music school, playing the piano. The Matić brothers finished their schooling in Zemun.

== Career ==
In October 2012 Matić performed the pop duet "Čili" with Milica Pavlović on Grand Show.

== Personal life ==
Matić married Jelena Ristić on 17 July 2012 in Bežanija, a neighborhood in Belgrade. She was four months pregnant on their wedding day with their first child, a son named Zoran, who was born in Vienna on 17 December 2012. Their second child was born 21 March 2015.

Matić previously dated Slađana Mandić, a singer from Sarajevo who later competed in the televised singing contest Zvezde Granda in 2012.

== Discography ==
- Zaigraj (2002)
- Željo moja (2004)
- Sinonim za ljubav (2009)
- Dala si mi svega osim ljubavi (2010)
- 100 života (2013)
- Oko nas (2015)
