= I Am Georgina =

- Genre: Reality television
- Starring: Georgina Rodríguez; Cristiano Ronaldo; Ivana Rodríguez
- Country of origin: Spain
- Original language: Spanish
- No. of seasons: 3
- No. of episodes: 18

Production
- Executive producers: Juampi Cofré; Georgina Rodríguez
- Production company: Netflix Studios

Original release
- Network: Netflix
- Release: January 27, 2022 – September 18, 2024

Soy Georgina, or I Am Georgina in English, is a reality television series that focuses on the life of the model and social media influencer Georgina Rodríguez, wife of the Portuguese footballer Cristiano Ronaldo. The series premiered on January 27, 2022 on the streaming service Netflix. A second season began in March 2023, and a third season began in September 2024. The series focuses on Rodríguez, Ronaldo and their five children, while also depicting the closest relatives of the family. The series is executive produced by Rodríguez and Juampi Cofré for Netflix Studios.

== Episodes ==
=== Season 1 (2022) ===
No. overall	No. in season	Title	Original release date
1	1	"The day that changed my life..."	January 27, 2022
2	2	"Blink, and you'll miss it..."	January 27, 2022
3	3	"Hectic days"	January 27, 2022
4	4	"Football, holidays and gender reveal..."	January 27, 2022
5	5	"Back to the beginning"	January 27, 2022
6	6	"New city, new plans, and good news..."	January 27, 2022

=== Season 2 (2023) ===
No. overall	No. in season	Title	Original release date
7	1	"Nothing's Perfect"	March 24, 2023
8	2	"Life Goes On"	March 24, 2023
9	3	"All for One and One for All"	March 24, 2023
10	4	"Make or Break"	March 24, 2023
11	5	"Dreams Come True"	March 24, 2023
12	6	"The Future Is Now"	March 24, 2023

=== Season 3 (2024) ===
No. overall	No. in season	Title	Original release date
13	1	"New Country, New Team"	September 18, 2024
14	2	"Family Vacation"	September 18, 2024
15	3	"Don’t Ruin the Silence"	September 18, 2024
16	4	"Gio’s 30s"	September 18, 2024
17	5	"Georgina in Paris"	September 18, 2024
18	6	"On to a Bright Future"	September 18, 2024
