= Sexy Señorita =

Single by Milica Pavlović

from the album Govor tela
- Released: 15 June 2013
- Genre: Pop
- Length: 3:14
- Label: Grand Production
- Songwriter(s): Endorfin Team

Milica Pavlović singles chronology
"Pakleni plan" (2013)	"Sexy Señorita" (2013)	"Alibi" (2014)

"Sexy Señorita" is a song recorded by Serbian pop recording artist Milica Pavlović and served as the third single from her debut studio album Govor tela. It was released 15 June 2013.

The song was first heard when Pavlović performed it on the television show Zvezde Granda. The music video was released 24 June 2013.
