= Magija =

Studio album by Jelena Karleuša
- Released: 22 February 2005
- Recorded: 2004
- Studio: Belgrade, Serbia
- Genres: Pop-folk; electropop
- Length: 35:40
- Label: City Records
- Producers: Marko Peruničić; Nebojša Arežina

Jelena Karleuša chronology
Samo za tvoje oči (2002)	Magija (2005)	JK Revolution (2008)

Magija (English: Magic) is the eighth studio album by Serbian singer Jelena Karleuša. Released on 22 February 2005, it was Karleuša's first studio album under City Records. Most of the tracks are covers to songs created by Phoebus. The lyrics were written by Marina Tucaković. The production was handled by Nebojša Arežina and Marko Peruničić from Atelje Trag, who were also involved in songwriting.

== Background ==
In February 2004, Karleuša competed in the Beovizija 2004 with the song "Moli me" in order to represent Serbia and Montenegro in Eurovision Song Contest. She ultimately finished in 11th place out of 28 entries, and thus failed to qualify for the grand final.

The album was promoted with music videos for the songs "Slatka mala" and "Upravo ostavljena". Both videos generated controversy in the conservative groups by respectively featuring drag queens and a scene of Karleuša crucified. The latter according to Kareluša meant to represent her position in public life. Serbian magazine Vreme likened Karleuša's "shocking" image in the music videos to Madonna.

== Track listing ==
All lyrics are written by Marina Tucaković; all music is composed by Phoebus, except "Da te nisam prevarila" and "Moli me"; all tracks are arranged and produced by Nebojša Arežina and Marko Peruničić.

Magija track listing
No.	Title	Length
1.	"Slatka mala"	3:26
2.	"Magija"	4:28
3.	"Nisi u pravu"	3:27
4.	"Da te nisam prevarila..."	3:07
5.	"Ne smem da se..." (featuring Saša Matić)	3:44
6.	"Upravo ostavljena"	3:47
7.	"Ide maca"	3:24
8.	"Krađa"	3:47
9.	"Sve je dozvoljeno"	3:30
10.	"Moli me" (featuring Marcus)	3:00
Total length:		35:40

Sample credits

- "Slatka mala" contains an interpolation of "Arabika" ("Арабика"; 1999), penned by Erik Chanturiya and composed by Pavel Esenin, and performed by Hi-Fi.
- "Magija" contains a sample of "Emet" ("אמת"; 2003) by Ishtar.
- "Nisi u pravu" contains a sample of "Poso mou leipei" ("Πόσο μου λείπει"; 2002) by Sotis Volanis.
- "Upravo ostavljena" contains a sample of "S'Agapo" (2002) by Mariada Pieridi.
- "Ide maca oko tebe" contains a sample of "Katse Kala" (2004) by Helena Paparizou.
- "Krađa" contains a sample of "El-Alim Allah" (2000) by Amr Diab.
- "Sve je dozvoljeno" contains a sample of "Gia Sena" (2002) by Giannis Tassios.

== Personnel ==
Credits adapted from the album's liner notes.

Performers and musicians

- Jelena Karleuša – vocals
- Ivana Peters - backing vocals
- Aleksandra Radović – backing vocals

== Release history ==
Country	Date	Format	Label
Serbia and Montenegro	February 22, 2005	CD; cassette; digital download	City Records
Various	March 21, 2023	Streaming	City Records
