= Pakleni plan =

Single by Milica Pavlović

from the album Govor tela
- Released: 11 February 2013
- Genre: Pop
- Length: 3:48
- Label: Grand Production
- Songwriter: Vladimir Graić

Milica Pavlović singles chronology
"Čili" (2012)	"Pakleni plan" (2013)	"Sexy Señorita" (2013)

"Pakleni plan" (Devilish Plan) is a song recorded by Serbian pop recording artist Milica Pavlović and served as the second single from her debut studio album Govor tela. It was released 11 February 2013. The song was written by Vladimir Graić.

The music video was directed by Andrej Ilić and Đorđe Trbović. The video premiered on Pavlović's YouTube channel, the same day as the song.
