= Govor tela =

Studio album by Milica Pavlović
- Released: 28 June 2014
- Recorded: 2012–14
- Genre: Pop-folk
- Label: Grand Production
- Producer: Atelje Trag

Milica Pavlović chronology
Govor tela (2014)	Boginja (2016)

Singles from Govor tela
- 1. "Tango" Released: 30 June 2012; 2. "Pakleni plan" Released: 11 February 2013; 3. "Sexy Señorita" Released: 15 June 2013; 4. "Alibi" Released: 2 January 2014

Govor tela (English: Body Language) is the debut studio album by Serbian recording artist Milica Pavlović. It was released 28 June 2014 through Grand Production. After finishing 8th in the televised singing contest Zvezde Granda in 2012, Pavlović was signed to the Grand record label and released her debut single, titled "Tango", in June.

The album also features three more previously released singles – "Pakleni plan", "Sexy Señorita", and "Alibi".

== Track listing ==
No.	Title	Lyrics	Music	Arrangement	Length
1.	"Dominacija"	Nemanja Antonić	Antonić	Antonić	3:13
2.	"Tango"	Aleksandar Marjan	Constantin Ioniță	Enes "Endži" Mavrić	3:51
3.	"Dve po dve"	Miloš Roganović	Filip Miletić	Miletić; Roganović	3:21
4.	"Milimetar"	Divna Milovanović	Bojan Vasić	Antonić	4:08
5.	"Sexy Señorita"	Endorfin Team	Endorfin Team	Endorfin Team	3:14
6.	"Pakleni plan"	Jovana Radosavljević	Vladimir "Graja" Graić	Graić; Dragan "Meddo" Milanović	3:48
7.	"Alibi" (featuring Nesh)	Vuksan Bilanović	Marko Peruničić; Nebojša Arežina	Atelje Trag	3:10
8.	"Alter ego"	Antonić	Antonić	Antonić	3:18
9.	"Mash Up Mix"	Radosavljević; Bilanović; Nemanja "Conte" Trbojević	Graić; Peruničić; Arežina; Vladimir "Uzi" Uzelac	Antonić	4:44

Notes

- "Tango" is a Serbian-language cover of "Haide hopa" ("Хайде опа"; 2010), penned by Rosen Dimitrov and composed by Costi Ioniță, as performed by Andrea.

== Release history ==
Country	Date	Format	Label
Serbia	June 28, 2014	CD	Grand Production
