= Diva (Jelena Karleuša album) =

2012 album by Jelena Karleuša

- Standard edition album cover

Studio album by Jelena Karleuša
- Released: 11 June 2012
- Recorded: 2009–2012
- Studio: Atelje Trag
- Genre: Pop; electropop; dance-pop
- Length: 41:29
- Language: Serbian
- Label: City Records
- Producer: Marko Peruničić; Nebojša Arežina

Jelena Karleuša chronology
All About Diva (2010)	Diva (2012)	The Best of Collection (2018)

Singles from Diva
- 1. "Insomnia" Released: 30 December 2009; 2. "Muškarac koji mrzi žene" Released: 4 January 2011; 3. "Nova religija (Plava Šeherezada)" Released: 26 June 2011

Diva is the tenth studio album by Serbian singer Jelena Karleuša, released on 11 June 2012 under City Records. The album features eleven tracks, including the three previously released songs: "Insomnia" (2009), "Muškarac koji mrzi žene" (2011) and "Nova religija" (2011). The lyrics on the album were written by Marina Tucaković, while the production was handled by Nebojša Arežina and Marko Peruničić from Atelje Trag.

Diva was sold in two series of 50,000 copies. According to media reports, it was the fastest-selling album by a Serbian artist. The album was promoted with Karleuša's second major solo concert, titled Viva La Diva, held in Ušće, Belgrade on 15 June 2013.[…]

== Background ==
Following the release of JK Revolution in 2008, Karleuša took a break from recording music due to pregnancies with her two daughters. In December 2009, she made her comeback by releasing the single "Insomnia". On 16 May 2010, Karleuša held her first major concert in the Belgrade Arena, called All About Diva Show.

In January 2011, Karleuša announced her forthcoming album with the release of the holographic performance of "Muškarac koji mrzi žene" (Man Who Hates Women). The song was followed by "Nova religija" (New Religion), which she performed in the grand final of the fourth season of the reality television show Big Brother in June 2011.

== Track listing ==
All tracks are arranged and produced by Nebojša Arežina and Marko Peruničić.

All lyrics are written by Marina Tucaković.

Diva track listing
No.	Title	Length
1.	"Mikrofon"	3:18
2.	"Pucaj u ljubav (Ne vredi)"	3:38
3.	"Krimi rad" (featuring Teča)	4:00
4.	"Savršen zločin"	3:25
5.	"Sodoma & Gomora"	3:00
6.	"Insomnia" (featuring Mirza Hamzić)	4:07
7.	"Radim na bol"	3:31
8.	"Muškarac koji mrzi žene"	4:01
9.	"Duboko ranjena"	3:48
10.	"Nova religija (Plava Šeherezada)"	4:03
11.	"So" (featuring Nesh)	4:05
Total length:		41:29

Sample credits

- "Mikrofon" contains a sample of "Alay" (2009) performed by Subliminal featuring Dana International.
- "Pucaj u ljubav" contains a sample of "Mio" (2011) performed by David Bustamante.
- "Krimi rad" contains a sample of "Criminel" (2010) performed by TLF featuring Indila.
- "Savršen zločin" contains a sample of "Adain Shelach" (2009) performed by Avihu Shabat.
- "Insomnia" contains a sample of "Dance Pe Chance" (2008) performed by Sunidhi Chauhan and Labh Janjua.
- "Muškarac koji mrzi žene" contains a sample of "Lucifer" (2010) performed by Shinee.
- "Duboko ranjena" contains a sample of "Ma Sh'haya Haya" (2011) performed by Maya Bouskilla.
- "Nova religija" contains a sample of "Dum Dum" (2010) by Benny Dayal and Himani Kapoor.
- "So" contains a sample of "La Terrazza" (2008) performed by Dean Newton featuring Huggy.

== Personnel ==
Credits adapted from the liner notes of Diva.

- Jelena Karleuša - vocals
- Ivana Peters - background vocals
- Jelena Mitić - background vocals
- Suzana Dinić - background vocals
- Rastko Petrović - acoustic guitar, baglama
- Vladimir Čukić - bass guitar
- Zoran "Petra" Petrović - electric guitar
- Vojno Dizdar - piano
- Nebojša Arežina - production, mixing
- Marko Peruničić - production, mixing, background vocals
- Oliver Jovanović - mastering
- Zoran Birtašević - executive producer, design, creative director
- Dejan Milićević - photography

== Release history ==
Country	Date	Format	Label
Serbia	June 11, 2012	CD; digital download	City Records
