= Samo za tvoje oči =

Samo Za Tvoje Oči

Studio album by Jelena Karleuša
- Released: December 20, 2002
- Recorded: 2002
- Studio: Phase One Recording Studio, Glyfada
- Genre: Pop; laiko
- Length: 40:58
- Label: RTV BK Telecom
- Producer: Phoebus

Jelena Karleuša chronology
Za svoje godine (2001)	Samo Za Tvoje Oči (2002)	Magija (2005)

Samo Za Tvoje Oči (English: For Your Eyes Only) is the seventh studio album by Serbian singer Jelena Karleuša, released on 20 December 2002 through BK Sound. The songs were written and produced by Phoebus in collaboration with Heaven Music. Marina Tucaković wrote the lyrics. In 2021, Karleuša revealed that Toše Proeski recorded the background vocals for the album, whilst also working with Phoebus on his album Ako me pogledneš vo oči in Athens.

In April 2003, Karleuša promoted the album with a performance in the Beovizija 2003 contest, where she also received the Foreign Breakthrough Award.

== Track listing ==
All lyrics are written by Marina Tucaković, except where noted; all music is composed by Phoebus; all production is handled by Phoebus.

Samo za tvoje oči track listing
No.	Title	Lyrics	Length
1.	"Manijak"		3:46
2.	"Samo za tvoje oči"		4:10
3.	"Pazi se"		3:18
4.	"Moj dragi"		4:13
5.	"Ne, ne, ne"		4:13
6.	"Radoznala"		3:59
7.	"Još te volim"		4:54
8.	"Zar ne"		3:31
9.	"Love"	Vivi Vlachos	3:36
10.	"Manijak" (Remix Version by Valentino)		5:13
Total length:			40:58

Notes

- "Samo za tvoje oči" is a Serbian-language cover of "Gia" ("Γεια"; 2001), written by Phoebus, and performed by Despina Vandi.
- "Pazi se" is a Serbian-language cover of "Apapa" ("Άπαπα"; 1999), written by Phoebus and performed by Despina Vandi.
- "Još te volim" is a Serbian-language cover of "Ipofero" ("Υποφέρω"; 2000), written by Phoebus, and performed by Despina Vandi, which itself interpolates "Faithless" (1995), written by Maxi Jazz, Sister Bliss and Rollo, and performed by Faithless.
- "Zar ne" is a Serbian-language cover of "To allo miso" ("Το άλλο μισό; 1997), written by Phoebus, and performed by Despina Vandi.

== Personnel ==
Credits adapted from the album's liner notes

Performers and musicians

- Jelena Karleuša – vocals
- Marija Mihajlović, Madame Piano, Aleksandar Mitrović and Dimos Beke – background vocals
- Antonis Gounaris – guitar
- Phoebus – keyboards and piano
- Hakan Singolou – sazi
- Manolis Vlachos – engineering and mixing
- Vangelis Siapatis – engineering and editing

== Release history ==
Country	Date	Format	Label
Serbia and Montenegro	December 20, 2002	CD; cassette	RTV BK Telecom

== See also ==
- Samo za tvoje oči at Discogs
