= List of shopping malls in Serbia =

This is a list of shopping malls in Serbia.

== Shopping malls ==
The list of shopping malls in Serbia with total gross leasable area (GLA) in square metres (m^{2}):

Shopping mall	City	Opened	Notes	GLA m^{2}
Galerija Belgrade	Belgrade	2020		93,000
BIG Fashion Novi Sad	Novi Sad	2018		48,000
Ušće Shopping Center	Belgrade	2009		47,000
Beo Shopping Center	Belgrade	2020		43,000
Delta Planet	Niš	2021		37,000
Ada Mall	Belgrade	2019		34,000
BIG Fashion Beograd	Belgrade	2017		32,000
Delta City	Belgrade	2007		30,000
Stadion Shopping Center	Belgrade	2013		28,000
BIG Fashion Kragujevac	Kragujevac	2012		22,400
Mercator Centar	Belgrade	2002		20,000
Mercator Centar	Novi Sad	2007		19,000
Rajićeva Shopping Center	Belgrade	2017		15,300
West 65 Mall	Belgrade	2021		15,300
Forum Shopping Center	Niš	2011		11,000
Zira Centar	Belgrade	2007		7,000
Novi Sad Bazaar	Novi Sad	2008		7,000

== Retail parks ==
The list of retail parks in Serbia with total gross leasable area (GLA) in square metres (m^{2}):

Retail park	City	Opened	Notes	GLA m^{2}
BIG Novi Sad	Novi Sad	2012		46,000
AVA Shopping Park	Belgrade	2022		30,000
BIG Pančevo	Pančevo	2011		27,900
BIG Zrenjanin	Zrenjanin	2015		25,000
BIG Rakovica	Belgrade	2017		23,000
BIG Čačak	Čačak	2025		16,500
BIG Šabac	Šabac	2025		16,500
Forum Park Zemun	Belgrade	2015		16,000
Tempo Plus Retail Park Niš	Niš	2025		16,000
BIG Pazova	Stara Pazova	2023		15,700
BIG Fashion Park	Belgrade	2019		15,000
ARA Plaza	Aranđelovac	2025		15,000
Gold Park	Smederevo	2025		14,000
Stop Shop Niš	Niš	2016		13,400
Stop Shop Borča	Belgrade	2016		13,000
Lesko Park	Leskovac	2025		12,000
Aviv Park	Belgrade	2015		11,500
Tempo Plus Retail Park Kraljevo	Kraljevo	2025		11,500
Stop Shop Lazarevac	Lazarevac	2017		10,100
BIG Bor	Bor	2025		10,000
Stop Shop Subotica	Subotica	2016		10,000
VIVO Shopping Park	Jagodina	2014		10,000
Retail Park Vrbas	Vrbas	2023		10,000
BIG Kraljevo	Kraljevo	2017		9,800
Stop Shop Šabac	Šabac	2014		9,600
Stop Shop Sremska Mitrovica	Sremska Mitrovica	2019		9,300
Stop Shop Smederevo	Smederevo	2017		9,200
BIG Kruševac	Kruševac	2019		8,500
BIG Obrenovac	Obrenovac	2021		8,500
Stop Shop Vršac	Vršac	2018		8,250
Zona Vranje	Vranje	2021		8,000
PULS Shopping Park	Pirot	2021		8,000
Shopping Park Ruma	Ruma	2024		8,000
BIG Kragujevac	Kragujevac	2023		8,000
TCM	Mladenovac	2011		8,000
Delta Park	Kragujevac	2010		7,000
NEST Užice	Užice	2015		7,000
Stop Shop Požarevac	Požarevac	2018		7,000
Samald Shopping Park	Novi Pazar	2023		7,000
Stop Shop Leskovac	Leskovac	2019		6,500
Stop Shop Zaječar	Zaječar	2019		6,500
Shop Park Gornji Milanovac	Gornji Milanovac	2020		6,500
Stop Shop Čačak	Čačak	2015		6,300
Stop Shop Valjevo	Valjevo	2016		6,100
Kiki Park	Kikinda	2024		5,500
Stop Shop Sombor	Sombor	2017		5,600
Bor Properties	Bor	2023		4,000
NEST Vršac	Vršac	2020		3,000

== Outlet centers ==
The list of outlet centers in Serbia with total gross leasable area (GLA) in square metres (m^{2}):

Outlet center	City	Opened	Notes	GLA m^{2}
BIG Fashion Outlet	Inđija	2012		11,200

== See also ==
- List of supermarket chains in Serbia
