= Grand Festival =

Grand Festival (Serbian Cyrillic: Гранд фестивал) is a competitive festival of pop-folk and turbo-folk music, organized by Grand Production.

== Format ==
In the first edition of the competition organized two evenings. 2008 was the first contest to have two semi-finals with 22 songs. Top 12 from each semi-final has gone to the final. For the third edition, the festival introduced a rule that 50% of the votes given the jury, and 50% of the audience.

The most successful contestants receive money prizes.
