= JK Revolution =

Revolution

Studio album by Jelena Karleuša
- Released: 7 February 2008
- Recorded: June–December 2007
- Genre: Electropop
- Length: 36:44
- Label: City Records
- Producer: Atelje Trag

Jelena Karleuša chronology
Magija (2005)	Revolution (2008)	The Diamond Collection (2009)

Revolution is the ninth studio album by Serbian singer Jelena Karleuša. It was released on 7 February 2008 through City Records. The tracks on the album were produced by Marko Peruničić and Nebojša Arežina from Atelje Trag, whilst the lyrics were written by Marina Tucaković with the assistance from Ljiljana Jorgovanović.

Revolution was sold in 250,000 compact discs and 30,000 cassette tapes.

== Background ==
In January 2008, the album was announced with the release of the music video for "Tihi ubica" on Pink, for which Karleuša faced public scrutiny because it was shot in the historical Karlovci Gymnasium. The school's professors, students and their parents launched a petition to ban the music video from airing on television because of its "sexually explicit content". Moreover, the provincial secretary for education and culture of Vojvodina, Zoltan Jegeš, publicly condemned the video and threatened the school with inspection. The studio session of "Tihi ubica" leaked to the public, which also provoked discussions about Karleuša's vocal abilities.

== Track listing ==
All tracks are produced by Nebojša Arežina and Marko Peruničić.

All lyrics are written by Marina Tucaković and Ljiljana Jorgovanović.

Revolution track listing
No.	Title	Length
1.	"Tihi ubica"	3:54
2.	"Testament"	3:51
3.	"Ko ti to baje"	3:52
4.	"Saki"	3:09
5.	"Casino"	5:12
6.	"Jedna noć i kajanje"	3:31
7.	"Pamet u glavu"	3:14
8.	"Baš je dobro biti ja" (feat. Marcus)	2:50
9.	"Mala"	3:39
10.	"Mala - Teatro Mix"	3:49
Total length:		36:44

Bonus music video
No.	Title	Length
1.	"Tihi ubica"	4:09

Sample credits

- "Tihi ubica" contains a sample of "Se Esfuma Tu Amor" (2004) by Marc Anthony.
- "Testament" contains a sample of "Torre De Babel" (2006) by David Bisbal featuring Wisin & Yandel.
- "Ko ti to baje" contains a sample of "Aashiq Banaya Aapne" (2005) by Himesh Reshammiya and Shreya Ghoshal.
- "Saki" contains a sample of "Saaki Saaki" (2004) by Sukhwinder Singh and Sunidhi Chauhan.
- "Casino" contains a sample of "Hagiga" (2004) by Sarit Hadad.
- "Jedna noć i kajanje" contains a sample of "Mon Pays" (2006) by Faudel Belloua.
- "Pamet u glavu" contains a sample of "Smack My Bitch Up" (1997) by The Prodigy.
- "Mala" contains a sample of "Mayya" (2006) by Maryem Tollar, Chinmayi and Keerthi Sagathia.
- "Mala (Teatro Mix)" contains a sample of "No More Tears" (1979) by Barbra Streisand and Donna Summer.

== Personnel ==
Credits adapted from the album's liner notes.

Performers and musicians

- Jelena Karleuša – vocals
- Ceca Slavković - backing vocals (tracks 1, 2, 3, 4, 6, 8, 9 and 10)
- Aleksandra Radović – backing vocals (track 5)
- Marija Mihajlović – backing vocals (tracks 7)
- Miki Element - backing vocals (track 1)
- Dejan Momčilović – drums (track 4)
- Vladimir Čukić - bass (tracks 1, 4, 6 and 7)
- Zoran Petrović – guitar (tracks 1, 2, 4 and 6)
- Bane Kljajić – guitar (track 2)

== Release history ==
Country	Date	Format	Label
Serbia	February 7, 2008	CD; cassette; digital download	City Records
