= Saša Matić =

Saša Matić Саша Матић
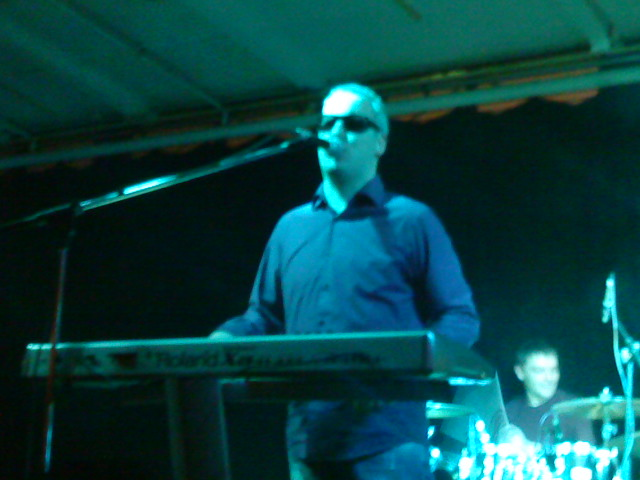
- Matić performing in 2010

Background information
- Born: Aleksandar Matić; 26 April 1978 (age 48); Bihać, SR Bosnia and Herzegovina, SFR Yugoslavia
- Genres: Pop-folk
- Occupation: Singer
- Instruments: Vocals; piano; accordion
- Years active: 1994–present
- Label: Grand Production

Aleksandar "Saša" Matić (Serbian Cyrillic: Александар Саша Матић; born 26 April 1978) is a Bosnian Serb pop-folk singer. He is the twin brother of fellow singer Dejan Matić.

== Life and career ==
=== Early life ===
Matić was born on 26 April 1978 in Bihać, SFR Yugoslavia. He has a twin brother, Dejan, who is also a well-known singer. They were born prematurely and subsequently became completely blind due to unexplained circumstances. Matić initially grew up in Drvar, before moving to Belgrade with his family.

During his childhood, he learned to play the piano and accordion. Matić graduated from the Zemun Gymnasium and the Music High School 'Kosta Manojlović'. He has cited Croatian singer-songwriter Oliver Dragojević as his musical influence.

=== Career ===
Matić made his recording debut in 2001 with the album Prokleta je violina, which was released under Grand Production. He has released ten studio albums. Matić has collaborated with various regional singers, including Ceca, Severina, Jelena Karleuša, Aca Lukas, Mile Kitić, Jelena Rozga and Milica Pavlović.

Since March 2016, Matić has held several sold-out solo concerts at the Belgrade Arena. He has also had regional, as well as international tours in the United States, Canada and Australia. In 2023, it was reported that Matić was the highest attended live act in 2022, Croatia with his four concerts at the Arena Zagreb and Spaladium Arena, which were collectively attended by 80,000 people.

=== Personal life ===
Matić is married to Anđelija, with whom he has two daughters.

== Discography ==
Studio albums

- Prokleta je violina (2001)
- Otišao vratio se (2002)
- Zbogom ljubavi (2003)
- Anđeo čuvar (2005)
- Poklonite mi nju za rođendan (2007)
- Nezaboravne (2010)
- X zajedno (2011)
- Zabranjena ljubav (2015)
- Ne bih ništa menjao (2017)
- Dva života (2021)

== Music festivals ==
- Music Festival Budva (2003) - "Moj grad" (1st Place)
- Ohrid Fest (2003) - "Moj grad" (Jury Vote Winner)
- Grand Festival (2006) - "Sve je na prodaju" (1st Place)
- Grand Festival (2010) - "Nije ljubav trag na hartiji" (Jury Vote Winner)
- Radijski festival (2013) - "Nađi novu ljubav"

== Awards and nominations ==
List of awards and nominations of Saša Matić
Year	Award	Category	Nominee/work	Result	Ref.
2019	Music Awards Ceremony	Concert of the Year	Štark Arena - March 8, 2017	Nominated	
2020	Music Awards Ceremony	Cover Song of the Year	"A ja imam tebe"	Nominated	
2020	Music Awards Ceremony	Male Artist of the Year	Himself	Won	
2023	Music Awards Ceremony	Collaboration of the Year	"Ti i ja" (feat. Jelena Rozga)	Won	
2023	Music Awards Ceremony	Contribution to Regional Music	Himself	Won	

== See also ==
- Music of Serbia
- Turbo-folk
- Dejan Matic

Awards and achievements
Preceded by Saša Vasić	Music Festival Budva winner (tied with Dado Topić); 2003	Succeeded by Marija Šerifović
Preceded by None	Grand Festival winner 2006	Succeeded by Aca Lukas
