= Milica Pavlović =

Serbian singer (born 1991)

- Милица Павловић
- Born: 11 August 1991 (age 35); Einsiedeln, Switzerland
- Citizenship: Switzerland; Serbia
- Education: Megatrend University
- Occupations: Singer; songwriter; dancer; actress
- Years active: 2010–present
- Height: 1.70 m (5 ft 7 in)
- Musical career
- Genres: Pop-folk; pop; dance-pop; turbo-folk
- Instrument: Vocals
- Labels: Grand Production; Senorita Music

Milica Pavlović (Serbian Cyrillic: Милица Павловић, pronounced [mîlitsa pǎːʋloʋitɕ]; born 11 August 1991) is a Serbian singer. She came to prominence as a contestant on the singing competition show Zvezde Granda in 2011. Pavlović has released six studio albums: Govor tela (2014), Boginja (2016), Zauvek (2018), Posesivna (2022), Lav (2023), and Caka (2026).

== Early life and education ==
Pavlović was born on 11 August 1991 in Einsiedeln, Switzerland to Serbian immigrant parents Mirjana Đorđević and Dragoslav Pavlović. Her parents divorced when infant Milica was only three months old. Because her father continued working in Switzerland, she was brought up in the village of Gornji Bunibrod, near Leskovac by her paternal grandparents, Rada and Vladimir Pavlović.

Pavlović graduated from the Stanisav Binički Music High School in Leskovac and also took singing lessons from voice teachers Aleksandra Radović and Suzana Branković. In 2014, Pavlović earned a degree in public relations from the Megatrend University.

== Career ==
=== 2010–2019: Career beginnings, Govor tela, Boginja and Zauvek ===
Pavlović debuted at Radijski Festival with the song "Dođi". She rose to prominence as a contestant on the televised singing show Zvezde Granda in 2011 and 2012, where she received particular notice for her stage performance. She managed to reach the season final in 2012, finishing in the 8th place. Upon the conclusion of the Zvezde Granda season, she was signed to Grand Production, through which she released her first single "Tango" in June 2012. In October the same year, Pavlović also collaborated with folk singer Dejan Matić on the song "Chili, chili". Her debut album Govor tela was released in June 2014 under Grand Production. It was preceded by the singles "Pakleni plan" and "Seksi senjorita" in 2013. Govor tela was sold in two circulations of 30,000 copies.

Her sophomore album Boginja was released in December 2016. It also included previously released standalone singles "Selfie" (2015), "Demantujem" (2015), "La Fiesta" (2016) and "Ljubi ljubi" (2016). The album featured several stand-out hits, such as "Mogla sam" and "Boginja", while all eleven music videos have collectively accumulated close to 300 million views on YouTube as of June 2022. Pavlović released the music video for the song "Operisan od ljubavi" in July 2017, which was inspired by the 2000 film Malèna. In July the following year, she released a duet with Aca Lukas, titled "Kidaš me". On 22 December 2018, Pavlović released her third studio album Zauvek, on which she collaborated with the Greek songwriter Phoebus alongside her past collaborators. In 2019, Pavlović became the brand ambassador for German retail brand Deichmann in Serbia and Bosnia and Herzegovina.

=== 2020–present: Posesivna and Lav ===
In 2021, Pavlović had a lead role on the first season of the television series Pevačica, which aired on Superstar and Pink. In 2021, she also co-founded the fashion brand Rouzhe along with Serbian designer Biljana Tipsarević. On 11 April 2022, Pavlović independently released Posesivna under her newly founded label Senorita Music. The album was preceded by three singles in 2021: "Crna jutra (Balkan S&M)", "Oko moje" featuring Saša Matić and "Dabogda propao". Posesivna was sold in 10,000 units. Tracks "Šećeru", "15ica" and "Provereno" debuted on Billboard's Croatia Songs chart, the lattermost of which reached the top of the chart. Later that year, she announced her first solo concert at the Čair Hall in Niš, titled Kraljica Juga (Queen of the South). On 11 February 2023, Pavlović held the live show to a sold-out venue.

Her fifth studio album, Lav, was released on 20 June 2023. The lead single, "Venčanje", had been previously released in late May. The album was supported with her first regional tour. The first show was held at the Belgrade Arena on December 23, 2023. On 13 August 2023, Jelena Karleuša released her studio album Alpha, which contained a duet with Pavlović, titled "Mashallah". On 23 December 2023, Pavlović held a concert in the sold-out Belgrade Arena. Her first EP, titled Milijarda, which referenced her reaching one billion views on all of her music videos together, was released on 13 May 2024. On 25 June 2025, Coby released his debut studio album Dar i kletva, which contained a duet with Pavlović, titled "Stara igra".

== Discography ==
Studio albums

- Govor tela (2014)
- Boginja (2016)
- Zauvek (2018)
- Posesivna (2022)
- Lav (2023)
- Caka (2026)

== Tours and concerts ==
- Kraljica Juga - Čair Hall, Niš (11 February 2023)
- Lav Tour (2023–2025)
- Kraljica Juga 2 - Čair Hall, Niš (26 December 2025)

== Filmography ==
Filmography of Milica Pavlović
Year	Title	Role	Genre	Notes
2011-12	Zvezde Granda	Herself	Television	Season 6, contestant
2016	Tvoje lice zvuči poznato	Herself	Television	Season 3, Episode 3 (contestant)
2021	Pevačica	Ivana Lazić	Television	Season 1, lead role
2025	LAV The Showrunner	Herself	Documentary	
2025	LAV The Show	Herself	Concert film	

== Awards and nominations ==
List of awards and nominations of Milica Pavlović
Year	Award	Category	Nominee/work	Result	Ref.
2015	Oskar Popularnosti	Best Stage Performance	Herself / "Dominacija"	Won	
2016	Oskar Popularnosti	Best Female Singer	Herself	Won	
2017	Oskar Popularnosti	Album of the Year	Boginja	Won	
2019	Music Awards Ceremony	Traditional/Modern Folk Song of the Year	"Operisan od ljubavi"	Won	
2023	Music Awards Ceremony	Pop-Folk Song of the Year	"Provereno"	Nominated	
2023	Music Awards Ceremony	Viral Song of the Year	"Šećeru" (feat. Albino)	Nominated	
2023	Music Awards Ceremony	Album of the Year	"Posesivna"	Won	
2022	Festival of Drama and Series (FEDIS)	Best Acting Couple	Herself and Miloš Timotijević	Won	

== Personal ==
Being raised away from her mother, the two developed a fraught relationship. In a 2019 interview, Pavlović stated that she had not spoken to her mother in ten years.

Pavlović is a practicing Orthodox Christian. In October 2025, she announced plans to construct a small Orthodox place of worship with her father, Dragoslav, in her home village and reflected on the central importance of religious faith and spirituality to her life. Her press release emphasized a powerful spiritual experience she had during a trip to Bali, where a priest helped her in a ritual of "purifying karma", which involved singing and prayer.

== See also ==
- Music of Serbia
