= Emina Jahović =

Serbian singer-songwriter (born 1982)

- Емина Јаховић
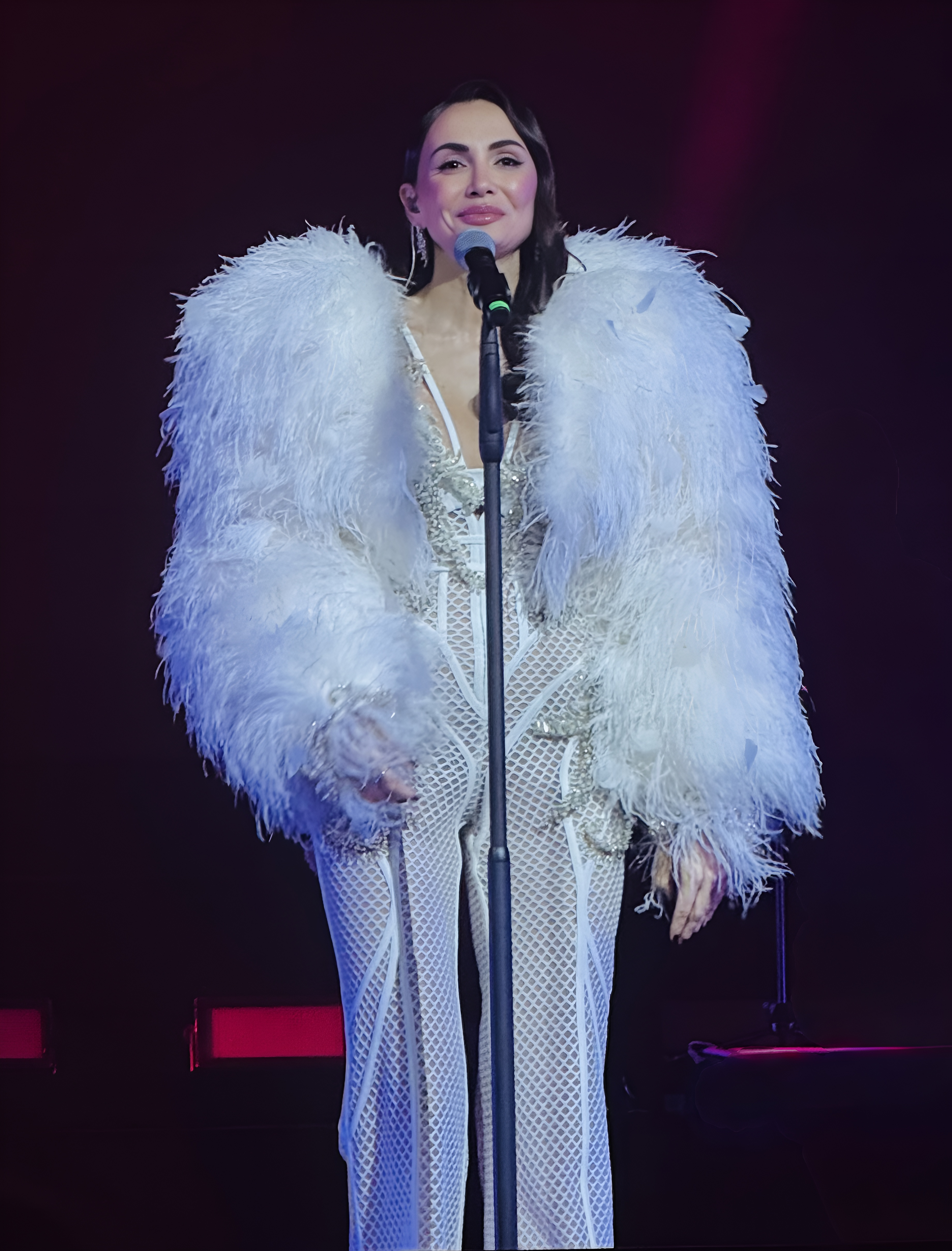
- Jahović performing during the Svitanje Tour in 2025
- Born: 15 January 1982 (age 44); Novi Pazar, SR Serbia, SFR Yugoslavia
- Other names: Emina Türkcan; Emina Sandal
- Citizenship: Serbia; Turkey
- Occupations: Singer; songwriter; actress; businesswoman
- Spouses: Aladin Đulović (m. 1999; div. 1999) Mustafa Sandal (m. 2008; div. 2018)
- Children: 2
- Relatives: Mirsad Türkcan (brother)
- Musical career
- Genres: Pop; dance-pop; R&B
- Years active: 2002–present
- Labels: City Records; PGP RTS; Multimedia; IDJTunes
- Website: eminanetwork.com

Emina Jahović (Serbian Cyrillic: Емина Јаховић, pronounced [emǐːna jâːhovit͡ɕ]; born 15 January 1982) is a Serbian singer-songwriter. Born and raised in Novi Pazar, she made her recording debut in 2002 and has released six studio albums: Tačka (2002), Radije ranije (2005), Vila (2009), Metamorfoza (2014), Dalje (2018) and Svitanje (2025).

Outside her singing career, Jahović starred as Lale Taşkıran Ilgaz in the television series Lale Devri, between 2010 and 2014. She also served as a judge on the singing competitions X Factor Adria (2013) and Rising Star Türkiye (2016).

== Early life ==
Emina Jahović was born on 15 January 1982 in Novi Pazar to a Muslim Bosniak family. Her mother Senija worked as a paediatrician and father Nusret was a cardiologist. She has two older siblings, including NBA player Mirsad Türkcan. Emina lost her father at the age of thirteen. She started attending music school during middle school and took theatre lessons in high school. Jahović eventually received a bachelor's degree in management from the Braća Karić University in Belgrade.

== Career ==
She began her career by competing at regional music festivals and won at the youth festival Zlatna staza in Montenegro with "Samo ti, moja muziko" ("Only You, My Music"). Jahović then rose to prominence upon her debut album Tačka ("Enough") in 2002, which was released under Dino Merlin's record label. That album features a song U La La with which she participated in BH Eurosong 2002, a Bosnian preselection for the Eurovision Song Contest, finishing fourth. Jahović in 2004 joined pop-rock band Hari Mata Hari on their tour across Bosnia and Herzegovina and North America, performing for Yugoslav diaspora. Her sophomore album, Radije ranije ("Rather Sooner"), was released through City Records in 2005. It saw significant success with hit-songs such as "Da l' ona zna" ("Does She Know"). The same year she was also declared the songwriter of the year at the Pjesma Mediterana festival in Budva.

In 2007, Jahović collaborated with Serbian duo Flamingosi on "La Gitana" ("The Gypsy Woman"). The single's accompanying music video was awarded at the Sunčane Skale festival in Montenegro. The following year, she released her first single in English, titled "Exhale", which was completely produced and recorded in New York City under the production wing of Bojan Dugić (aka Bojan "Genius" Dugic), the Recording Academy's Grammy Awards voting member who worked with such best selling artists as Beyoncé, Britney Spears, Jay-Z, and Jennifer Lopez. The maxi single contained remix tracks by DJs, including Elvir Gazić and Levent Gündüz. The tracks "Push It" and "Push It (Remix)" featured Cory Gunz, an American rapper.

On 19 April 2008, the accompanying video for "Exhale" premiered on the MTV Adria show Top 20 which counts down the biggest videos in the localized version of the music and entertainment channel MTV Europe. Emir Khalilzadeh directed the video. Khalilzadeh also directed the music video for Emina's 2009 song "Pile moje" ("My Dear"), which was shot in historical places such as Istanbul High School.

In December 2008, she released her single "Još ti se nadam" ("I'm Still Hoping for You"), a duet with the Serbian singer Saša Kovačević. The song was first presented at the Serbian Radio Festival in Vrnjačka Banja. Jahović said that she had written the lyrics for "Još ti se nadam" after she had broken up with Mustafa Sandal for a short time in 2006. However, its music was credited to the influential Greek recording artist Michalis Hatzigiannis. The single was re-released later on in Emina's 2009 album. The music video for the song was shot on several different locations in Serbia and was considered to be one of the most expensive music videos in Serbian music history.

In 2009, as a special guest star, she performed the song "Pile moje" at Sunčane Skale. Additionally, "Rođeni sa greškom" ("Born With a Mistake"), which is a pop song performed by singers Ana Bebić, Milica Majstorović, and Danijel Pavlović, was written by Jahović in Istanbul, in the studio of her pop star husband Mustafa Sandal who is also a music producer.

On 21 May 2009, Jahović's third studio album Vila ("Fairy") was released through PGP RTS. She dedicated this album to her late grandfather, Adam. The album was recorded in two years and included songs written and composed by Jahović, except "Ne zaboravi" ("Don't Forget"), a song by Aleksandra Milutinović who also worked on Emina's previous albums, and "Zver" ("Beast"), which was co-written and co-produced by Dino Merlin. The track "Ne zaboravi" featured a back-up vocal by the famous Turkish pop singer İzel. The album also featured a duet with Dino Merlin, "Med" ("Honey"), which is known as the only song Merlin ever sang that he had not written by himself. It is also mentioned by Jahović that the reason why she chose the name Vila for the album is because she thought the title track was one of the best songs she had ever written and that was why she wanted people to pay attention to it.

On 25 October 2009, Jahović held a concert at the Sava Centar in New Belgrade, Serbia. Staged in support of her album Vila and comprising a set list of songs from that and her previous albums, she wore 13 costumes during the event and sang her greatest hits. Some of the guests including Saša Kovačević, Jelena Tomašević, and Sergej Ćetković joined her on stage for duets. Among the other guests were the Minister of Labour and Social Policy and the close family friend Rasim Ljajić, Mustafa Sandal, Marija Šerifović, Anabela, Milica Milša, Žarko Jokanović, Dragana Mirković, Hari Varešanović, and Mia Borisavljević.

=== 2011–2012: International collaborations ===
In 2011, Jahović released two singles, "Gospodine" ("Mister") and "Posle mene" ("After Me"). Both were released by City Records. "Gospodine" was written and composed by Jahović herself. This song was released as a duet with the famous singer Nataša Bekvalac on 8 March, the International Women's Day. "Posle mene" was premiered on 22 July 2011 on Prva Srpska Televizija's famous late-night talk show Veče sa Ivanom Ivanovićem, whereas the other guest of the show was minister Ljajić. The music video for the song "Posle mene" was shot in the summer of 2011, in Göcek, Fethiye. The video was directed by Miloš Nadaždin.

On 29 November 2011, she was named Person of the Year by Hello! Srbija and received the award, designed by Karim Rashid, which is also awarded to 23 other celebrities at the event held at the White Palace, a part of Belgrade's Royal Compound. On 16 December 2011, the ceremony aired on RTV Pink.

The song "Broken" that is recorded by the popular Turkish producer and DJ Erdem Kınay with vocals from its co-composer Emina, was released in March 2012, following Emina's Valentine's Day special "Beograd priča" ("Belgrade Is Talking") featuring Dženan Lončarević, which was published on 14 February 2012. The song was featured on the Erdem Kınay's album Proje and was written by the New York-based Turkish-American singer S. Derin Togar. After monitoring the international record market in 2012, the editors of the Eurodanceweb chose Jahović and Erdem Kınay's work "Broken" as the most interesting dance track for Turkey. The selected Turkish entry "Broken" was then voted by a professional jury of disc jockeys, journalists, producers, radio speakers and webmasters of popular websites and music blogs; yet, Belgium won the 2012 Eurodanceweb. At the 2006 Eurodanceweb Awards, Jahović was chosen Bosnia and Herzegovina's singer of the year, with the song "Živeo" ("Cheers"). Collecting a total of 80 points in the international music competition, she placed thirteenth out of 40 countries.

In December 2012, Emina's second Turkish single and first solo single in Turkish, "Kimse Yok Mu?" ("Is There Anyone?"), was recorded by Doğan Music Company. The song was written and composed by Jahović and Mustafa Sandal. The lyrics revolve around Jahović asking a man to go back to her. The Serbian version, "I da mogu" ("Even If I Could"), which peaked at number one in such Southeast European countries as Bulgaria, was also made available in 2012. Miloš Nadaždin directed the accompanying music video. Jahović is often referred to as the "Turkish J.Lo" since critics noted costume references and artistic similarities to the work of Jennifer Lopez. "I da mogu" was the second best-selling single of Serbia in 2013 and peaked at number two on the "Top 10 singlova" chart of City Records.

As of 2012, due to her association with the record label Croatia Records, Jahović was the first non-Croatian whose works were broadcast on Croatian Music Channel, which is the largest Croatian music channel and broadcasts only Croatian music and music of Croatian production.

During the year 2012, Jahović also collaborated with Hamza Haimami, the Moroccan-born dancer, creative director, and choreographer known for his work with Rihanna as well as with artists including Fergie, Katy Perry, Usher, will.i.am, and the Pussycat Dolls. Jahović has also worked with Marko Peruničić and Nebojša Arežina's songwriting and production team called Atelje Trag, which also collaborated with artists such as Jelena Karleuša and Lepa Brena.

=== 2013–2018: X Factor Adria and Dalje ===
On 27 February 2013, Jahović won the 3rd Media Awards of OMU for the Best Breakthrough Album. The 3rd Media Awards of OMU were held at the Atatürk Congress and Culture Center in Samsun. It was the first official music award that Jahović won in Turkey.

In April 2013, she released her single "Nedostaješ" ("You're Missed"). The song was written and composed by Jahović herself. The accompanying music video for the song was directed by Vedad Jašarević. Arranged by Seçkin Özer and produced by Samsun Demir, the Turkish version of the song is known as "Yakışmaz" ("Unsuitable"). The lyrics to the song were written by Deniz Erten. Released in May 2013 through Doğan Music Company, "Yakışmaz" was Emina's third single in Turkish language. The lyrics of the pop-flamenco song revolve around the theme of love and grief. On 2 June 2013, Jahović performed her song "Nedostaješ" on RTV Pink's VIP Room 2013 at Elite Model Look final in Serbia.

In June 2013, she announced her fourth album with the release of the song "Žena zmaj" ("Dragon Lady"). In September, Jahović was announced as the judge and coach on the first season of X Factor Adria alongside Željko Joksimović, Kristina Kovač and Kiki Lesendrić. In October the following year, she released Metamorfoza ("Metamorphosis") under City Records. The album included seven main tracks and five previously released songs as bonus tracks. It was sold in 50,000 units.

On 23 January 2018, Jahović released her fifth studio album Dalje ("Farther") through IDJTunes. On the album she collaborated with Darko Dimitrov, who wrote the songs alongside her. Dalje was preceded by three singles in 2017: "Protiv svih" ("Against Everybody"), "Limunada" ("Lemonade") featuring Milica Todorović, and "Karma". The music video for "Limunada" accumulated over 80 million views on YouTube.

== Artistry ==
=== Musical themes and voice style ===
"I da mogu" (2012)
A 30-second sample of Emina Jahović's "I da mogu" featuring the chorus sung by Jahović in the range of B_{2} to C♯, backed by a synth marching beat. The song became an international hit single in southeastern Europe.

Originally marketed as a teen pop singer on late 1990s and early 2000s, Jahović is known for blending R&B with schlager music. Reviewers identify Emina's music as mainly belonging to pop music genre; however, among fusion and subgenres that her music is referred to as are traditional pop, teen pop, synthpop, soft rock, power pop, pop rock, indie pop, glam rock, Europop, Euro disco, electropop, easy listening, disco house, deep house, dance-pop, Britpop, bebop, and ballad.

The constant theme in Jahović's music and lyrics is love, although she has written on other subjects including grief. Considering her vocal agility and endurance, Emina's voice is likely to be classified as mezzo-soprano with a warm lower register and an agile high register.

=== Public image ===
Jahović is widely known as "pop princeza" ("Pop Princess"). However, she is sometimes referred to as "pop diva" and "srpska diva" ("Serbian Diva"). As a result of her album Vila, Serbian media also gave her the nickname of "balkanska vila" ("Fairy of the Balkans").

Jahović has been quite popular across the entire area of the former Yugoslavia and all around Eastern Europe. She is also known in such regional countries as Iran for her protagonistic role in Omre Gole Laleh and is widely recognized amongst the diaspora communities of the former Yugoslavia in western Europe, United States, Australia, and Canada.

In his column for Wired, the American science and technology magazine published by Condé Nast, Bruce Sterling described Jahović as "neo-Ottoman diva".

== Humanitarian work ==
Being a high paid artist in the Balkans, Jahović is involved in various philanthropic and charitable activities.

Jahović was the official face of the HRH Crown Princess Katherine Humanitarian Foundation's Campaign to Fight Against Breast Cancer. Jahović was announced the face of the health campaign on 7 October 2009 at the White Palace by Katherine, Crown Princess of Yugoslavia, who is the titular pretender queen consort of Yugoslavia.

== Other ventures ==
=== Acting career ===
Between 2010 and 2011, she was cast in the leading role as Lale Taşkıran Ilgaz in Lale Devri, a Turkish television primetime soap opera that airs on FOX. The series debuted on Show TV. Also airing in syndication in more than 30 countries around the world, Lale Devri was broadcast under the name Polje lala on RTV Pink in the Balkan Peninsula. In Azerbaijan, the series is called Lalə Dövrü and Emina's role is known as Lalə Ilqaz Kamal qızı. Emina Jahović rose to fame in the Arab World where the series Lale Devri, under the name ثورة التوليب, was aired by Middle East Broadcasting Center and Dubai TV. Similarly, Kazakh El-Arna television's Пора тюльпанов (tr. Pora tulpanov) helped Jahović get recognized as an actress by the Central Asian audience.

Later in 2012, Jahović and Mustafa Sandal were featured in the TV commercial Akıllı Telefon Hareketi for Turkcell, which aired throughout the year in order to promote the Turkish multinational telecommunications company's smartphone revolution.

In February 2013, Turkcell unveiled its second TV commercial featuring the Sandal couple, Maxi'yi Alan Yaşadı.

=== Modeling ===
Since her debut, she has been the face of a variety of advertising campaigns. Standing almost 5 feet 11 inches (180 centimeters) tall, Jahović was an official face of Fabrika and Kara, Turkish and Macedonian fashion labels respectively. Citing devotion to her family, she once rejected an offer from the most prestigious lingerie company in Turkey because she feared it could tarnish her brother's (6 ft 9 in) image in the country. Jahović is also famous for having long legs that are 122 cm (4 ft 1 in) in length. She was featured on the cover of numerous European magazines such as Cosmopolitan Serbia, Elele, Lepota i zdravlje, Maxim, Women's Health, Hafta Sonu, Mother and Baby, HELLO!, etc.

Throughout December 2010 Jahović Sandal documented her daily fashion and style choices for Vogue Türkiye official website Vogue.com.tr's popular sartorial section called "Today I'm Wearing"—"Bugün Ne Giydim?" feature in Turkish. Additionally, the 2013 Dosso Dossi Fashion Show that took place on 9 January 2013 featured performances by Sandal while Adriana Lima was walking the runway.

=== Yaemina Beauty ===
In June 2014, Jahović presented her first perfume, titled Closer. In January 2016, she launched her own beauty brand, Yaemina Beauty, and her second perfume Closer Swan City.

== Personal life ==
Apart from her native Serbian, she claims to speak English and Turkish fluently, and a bit of Bulgarian and Slovenian.

When she was 17, Jahović married fellow Novi Pazar resident Aladin Đulović. However, they divorced only six months later when Jahović's father-in-law Rustem Đulović opposed to her ambitions to become a professional singer.

On 13 January 2008, Jahović married the Turkish singer Mustafa Sandal whom she met in July 2004 in Bodrum, Muğla. Their first child was born in Istanbul on 8 August 2008. The couple also welcomed their second son on 21 February 2012. Jahović acquired Turkish citizenship in 2012. She divorced Sandal in 2018.

== Discography ==
=== Albums ===
==== Studio albums ====
List of studio albums, showing release date, label, chart positions and track listing
Title	Details	Notes
Tačka	Released: May 2002; Label: City, Magaza, In Takt Records; Format: CD, cassette	Track listing: | No. | Title | Length | |---|---|---| | 1. | "Osmi dan" | 3:33 | | 2. | "Mama" | 4:03 | | 3. | "Kad si sa njom" | 4:16 | | 4. | "Odbojka" | 3:14 | | 5. | "U la la" | 3:10 | | 6. | "Tačka" | 3:00 | | 7. | "Soba 23" | 3:40 | | 8. | "Brišeš tragove" | 3:25 | | 9. | "U la la" (Remix) | 3:25 | | 10. | "Sad nastavi" | 4:58 | | Total length: | | 36:44 |
Radije ranije	Released: June 2005; Label: City; Format: CD, cassette	Track listing: | No. | Title | Length | |---|---|---| | 1. | "Radije, ranije" | 3:21 | | 2. | "Da l' ona zna" | 3:36 | | 3. | "Crno i bijelo" | 3:40 | | 4. | "Tvoja greška" | 3:11 | | 5. | "Živeo..." | 3:47 | | 6. | "Pola oštrog noža" | 4:35 | | 7. | "Skini ruke s' mog vrata" | 3:14 | | 8. | "Molim te..." | 3:27 | | 9. | "Ona nije ja" | 3:36 | | 10. | "Bez problema" | 3:18 | Bonus tracks | No. | Title | Length | |---|---|---| | 11. | "Molim te" (Remix) | 4:00 | | 12. | "Voljela te il' ne voljela" | 3:14 | | 13. | "Uzalud se budim" | 4:32 | | Total length: | | 47:31 |
Vila	Released: 2009; Label: PGP-RTS; Format: CD	Track listing: | No. | Title | Length | |---|---|---| | 1. | "Pile moje" | | 2. | "Dan za danom" | | 3. | "Ne zaboravi" (featuring İzel) | | 4. | "Vila" | | 5. | "Med" (featuring Dino Merlin) | | 6. | "Aj" | | 7. | "Nastavljamo dalje..." | | 8. | "Zauvek" | | 9. | "Još ti se nadam" (featuring Saša Kovačević) | | 10. | "Zver" | | 11. | "Vila 2" |
Metamorfoza	Released: 22 October 2014; Label: City, Croatia; Format: CD, digital download, streaming	Track listing: | No. | Title | Length | |---|---|---| | 1. | "Opet si s njom" | 3:59 | | 2. | "Žena zmaj" | 3:18 | | 3. | "Nesanica" | 3:55 | | 4. | "Ne plašim se" | 4:24 | | 5. | "Telefon" | 3:16 | | 6. | "Za tebe pitam..." | 2:48 | | 7. | "Metamorfoza" | 3:45 | | 8. | "Prva dama" | 4:04 | Bonus tracks | No. | Title | Length | |---|---|---| | 9. | "Da mogu" | 3:22 | | 10. | "Nedostaješ" | 4:12 | | 11. | "Beograd priča" (featuring Dženan Lončarević) | 4:17 | | 12. | "Posle mene" | 4:20 | | 13. | "Gospodine" (featuring Nataša Bekvalac) | 4:13 | | Total length: | | 49:53 |
Dalje	Released: 23 January 2018; Label: IDJTunes; Format: CD, digital download, streaming	Track listing: | No. | Title | Length | |---|---|---| | 1. | "Dalje" | 3:28 | | 2. | "Limunada" (featuring Milica Todorović) | 3:20 | | 3. | "Alisa" | 4:09 | | 4. | "Krava" | 3:37 | | 5. | "Dva aviona" (featuring Željko Joksimović) | 3:35 | | 6. | "Protiv svih" | 3:38 | | 7. | "Karma" | 3:43 | | 8. | "Druga" | 3:46 | | 9. | "Izvini iskreno" | 3:12 | | Total length: | | 32:28 |
Svitanje	Released: 12 June 2025; Label: EJ Production; Format: Digital download, streaming	Track listing: | No. | Title | Length | |---|---|---| | 1. | "Fenix" | 2:58 | | 2. | "Nisam na vreme" | 3:03 | | 3. | "Nema više ljubavi" | 3:23 | | 4. | "Mani ga se" | 3:13 | | 5. | "Svitanje" | 3:01 | | 6. | "Zaljubila sam se" | 3:16 | | 7. | "Ništa ili sve" (featuring Mirza Selimović) | 3:02 | | 8. | "Odlazim da odem" (featuring Hava) | 2:52 | | 9. | "Probala sam" | 3:01 | | Total length: | | 27:49 |

==== Compilation albums ====
List of compilation albums, showing release date, label and chart positions
Title	Details
20 vanvremenskih hitova	Released: 2017; Label: City; Format: CD, digital download, streaming
Zlatna kolekcija	Released: 27 June 2025; Label: City; Format: Digital download, streaming

=== Extended plays ===
List of extended plays, showing release date, label, chart positions and track listing
Title
Exhale
Details
- Released: 18 June 2008
- Label: Multimedia, Hayat Production
- Format: CD
Notes
Track listing
- No.	Title	Length
  1.	"Exhale"	3:34
  2.	"Exhale" (Dance Remix)	5:35
  3.	"Exhale" (Elvir Gazić Remix)	5:34
  4.	"Exhale" (Levent Gündüz Be Funky Mix)	3:50
  5.	"Push It" (featuring Cory Gunz)	3:40
  6.	"Push It" (Remix; featuring Cory Gunz)	4:24
  Total length:		26:37

=== Singles ===
List of singles as lead artist, showing year released and album name
Title	Year	Album
"Exhale"	2008	Exhale
"Posle mene"	2011	Metamorfoza
"Kimse Yok Mu?"	2012	Non-album singles
"Yakışmaz"	2013	Non-album singles
"Muške priče" (with DJ Shone and Teča Gambino)	2015	Non-album singles
"Romeo"	2016	Non-album singles
"Lolo"	2016	Non-album singles
"Kost" (with Amel Ćurić)	2016	Non-album singles
"Protiv svih"	2017	Dalje
"Limunada" (featuring Milica Todorović)	2017	Dalje
"Karma"	2017	Dalje
"Güzelliğine" (with Edis)	2018	Non-album singles
"Prsten" (with Corona and Rimski)	2018	Non-album singles
"Vukovi"	2019	Non-album singles
"Exploziv" (featuring Gazda Paja)	2019	Non-album singles
"Muško više ne mogu" (with Nataša Bekvalac)	2019	Non-album singles
"Kriziram"	2020	Non-album singles
"Dobro sam" (featuring Edita)	2020	Non-album singles
"Malena" (with Teodora)	2021	Non-album singles
"Déjà vu" (with Angellina)	2021	Non-album singles
"Slagaću vas sve"	2023	Non-album singles
"Rano je" (with Aco Pejović)	2023	Non-album singles
"Dodirni me"	2023	Non-album singles
"Zidovi"	2024	Non-album singles
"Odlazim da odem" (with Hava)	2025	Svitanje
"Ništa ili sve" (with Mirza Selimović)	2025	Svitanje
"Krune"	2026	Non-album single

=== Guest appearances ===
List of non-single guest appearances, with other performing artists, showing year released and album name
Title	Year	Other artist(s)	Album
"Emina"	2005	Knez	Vanilla
"Nije više tvoja stvar"	2006	none	Trinaesti muzički festival Budva 2006
"La Gitana"	2006	Flamingosi	Gordost i predrasude
"Nemilo"	2009	Miligram	Miligram
"Ti kvariigro"	2010	none	Tri pa jedan za Oslo
"Broken"	2012	Erdem Kınay	Proje
"Çek Gönder"	2012	Mustafa Sandal	Organik
"Sudar svetova"	2026	Nucci	Dve barbike

=== Songwriting credits ===
List of songs written or co-written for other artists, showing year released and album name
Title	Year	Artist(s)	Album	Role
"Zapaliću srce"	2008	Dragana Mirković	Eksplozija	Lyricist
"Rođeni sa greškom"	2009	Ana Bebić, Milica Majstorović and Danijel Pavlović	Sunčane skale 2009 – Pjesma ljeta	Composer; lyricist
"Srce plače"	2009	Adnan Babajić and Kaya Ostojić	Sunčane skale 2009 – Pjesma ljeta	Composer; lyricist
"Vertigo"	2013	Jelena Tomašević	Ime moje	Composer; lyricist
"Moj svijet"	2014	Sergej Ćetković	Moj svijet	Co-lyricist
"Znam"	2015	Željko Joksimović	Zvezda	Lyricist
"Yıkıl Karşımdan"	2015	Gülben Ergen	Kalbimi Koydum	Composer
"Cafe"	2017	Lena Kovačević	Cafe	Lyricist
"Atina"	2018	Željko Vasić	Non-album singles	Lyricist
"Ostani"	2018	Jelena Rozga	Non-album singles	Composer; lyricist
"Moje proljeće"	2019	Jelena Rozga	Non-album singles	Composer; lyricist
"Ženo"	2020	Ana Nikolić	Klinika	Lyricist
"Exploziv"	2020	Angellina	Non-album single	Co-lyricist
"Crni leptir"	2021	Lena Kovačević	Cafe	Co-composer; lyricist
"Haram"	2023	Maya Berović	Milion	Composer; lyricist
"Nedostaješ"	2023	Maya Berović	Milion	Co-composer; lyricist
"Daleko"	2026	Dženan Lončarević	Non-album single	Composer; lyricist

== Awards and nominations ==
Year	Award	Category	Nominee/work	Result	Ref.
2010	Balkan Music Awards	Female Artist of the Year	Herself	Nominated	
2010	Balkan Music Awards	Best Song of the Balkans	"Med" (Emina feat. Dino Merlin)	Nominated	
2019	Music Awards Ceremony	Female Pop Song of the Year	"Druga"	Nominated	
2019	Music Awards Ceremony	Collaboration of the Year	"Limunada" (Emina feat. Milica Todorović)	Won	
2019	Music Awards Ceremony	Collaboration of the Year	"Dva aviona" (Emina feat. Željko Joksimović)	Nominated	
2019	Music Awards Ceremony	Music Video Song of the Year	"Limunada" (Emina feat. Milica Todorović)	Won	
2020	Music Awards Ceremony	Female Pop Song of the Year	"Vukovi"	Nominated	

== See also ==
- Music of Serbia
- List of singers from Serbia
- Serbian pop
