= Creative4D =

Serbian video production company

Creative4D is a Serbian video production company specializing in the production of music videos. The Director of Creative4D is Vedad Jašarević (from Sarajevo, Bosnia and Herzegovina), proclaimed music video director in the Balkans. Several of their music videos were produced in cooperation with Visual Infinity.

== Music Videos Produced ==
- Ne placi gade by Ada Grahovic
- Kisa je padala Ami G and Natalie Thanou
- Mala garava by Bane Nedovic
- Samo reci by Bane Nedovic
- To mi se sviđa by Beat Street and Viktor Savić
- Da me nije by Bojan Lukić Lukša
- Niko kao ti by Danijela Vranić and Aca Lukas
- Nemoj da me zalite by Danijela Vranić
- Ti mi nisi siguran by Danijela Vranić
- Tako ide by Darko Radovanović
- Kosa do ramena by Dženan Lončarević
- Putujemo snovima by Erato and Jacques Houdek
- Šta ti mogu (Gad) by Funky G
- Mastilo by Goca Trzan
- Voleo si skota by Goca Trzan
- Ne idi by Husa Beat Street
- Ne dolaziš u obzir by Indira Radić
- Pije mi se, pije by Indira Radić
- Moje je ime sreca by Ivana Selakov
- Otplovimo by Ivana Selakov
- Uradi mi to by Ivana Selakov
- Okeani by Jelena Tomašević
- Devojka za udaju by Katarina "Kaća" Sotirović
- Nisam znao da te volim by Kića Čoković and Wanted Band
- Farsa by Ksenija Pajčin
- Nino by Ksenija Pajčin
- Pizza by Ksenija Pajčin
- Zarobljena by Goca Tržan
- Vestica by Ksenija Pajčin
- Kako je, tako je by Lexington Band
- Da me malo hoce by Lexington Band & Bane Opacic
- Donesi by Lexington Band
- Pijane usne by Lexington Bend
- Uvredi me by Leksington
- Ako te zivot slomi by Lidija Milosevic & Dejan Matic
- Da li si prestala da volis me by Marko Djurovski
- Trebas mi by Marko Djurovski & Baki B3
- Još sam ona stara by Marina Tadić
- Ljubi, ljubi by Marina Tadić
- Ja mogu sve by Maja Markovic
- Luda za tobom by Maja Markovic
- Nije andjeo by Milan Radjen
- Face by Milan Stanković
- Sasvim sigurna by Nataša Barišić
- Da se nadjemo na pola puta by Neda Ukraden
- Srećo moja by Neda Ukraden
- Uzmi boje by Neverne bebe
- Za tvoje oči by Neverne Bebe & Vanna
- Kao pas by Nenad Manojlović
- Moja curice by Nikola Rokvic
- Ljubi mi se by Romana Panic
- Afrika by Sandra Prodanović Afrika
- Do jaja by Trik FX
- Belo odelo by Tropico Band
- Bojim se by Tropico Band
- Mislicu na tebe by Tropico Band
- Otisak by Tropico Band
- Ti ne znas by Tropiko Band
- Zar ti by Tropico Band
- Ničija by Vanja Toxic
- Nije za te by Željko Samardžić
- Mesec u vodi by Željko Samardžić
- Veruj bratu by Tropico Band feat. Dzenan Loncarevic
- Ne dam na tebe by Trio Pasage
- Praštam by Neverne Bebe
- Sve moje zore by Tropico bend
- Rekvijem by Neverne Bebe
- Luta mi se by Scandal Band feat. Suzana Dinić
- Cimerke by Fantastic Band
- Prišla by Lexington band
- Neka mi je šta mi je by Ivana Bojanović
- Potraži me by Leksington Band
- Taksi by Fantastic Band
- Nikom ne dam by Beso De Loco Band
- Big by Flamingosi i Nevena Božović
- Generale by Severina Vučković i Učiteljice
- Cura sa Balakana by Trik fx
- Tri čaše by Milica Todorović
- Mogu ja bez ljubavi by Sha feat. Cvija
- Buka i galama by Petra Kovačević
- Nije, Nije To Mia Borisavljević
- Pakleni put Zvonko Pantović Čipi i Osvajači
- Ako se u pesmi pronađeš Georg Smiljić
- Falim ti ja by Azur Dervisagic
- Moja vilo by Dragan Perović
- Gluve usne by Goca Tržan
- Alkohola Litar by Elitni odredi i Nikolija ft. DJ Mladja
- La fiesta by Sanja Dimitrijević
- Rakija by Mile Kitić
- Merak by Bane Nedović
- Daleko si by Aca Lukas i Ivana Selakov
- Dobro da nije vece zlo by Lexington Band
- Da Te Sretnem By Treći Svet
- Bumerang By Mia Borisavljević feat DJ Mlađa and MC Sha
- Maksimalni intervalni trening by Mit - Fit
- Krsim, lomim by Nemanja Staletovic
- Kavez by Marina Viskovic (in cooperation with AmiG production)
- Buduci moj by Minja Samardzic
