= Yakışmaz =

Single by Emina Sandal

from the album Upcoming (2013)
- A-side: "Yakışmaz"
- B-side: "Nedostaješ"
- Released: 2013
- Recorded: 2013; Seçkin Özer
- Genre: Flamenco, pop
- Length: 4:23
- Label: Doğan Müzik Company (DMC)
- Songwriters: Emina Jahović Sandal, Deniz Erten
- Producer: Samsun Demir

Emina Sandal singles chronology
"Kimse Yok Mu?" (2012)	"Yakışmaz" (2013)	"Žena zmaj" (2013)

Music video
- "Yakışmaz" on YouTube

"Yakışmaz" is a single recorded by Serbian-Turkish recording artist Emina Jahović Sandal. It was released in May 2013 by Samsun Demir through Doğan Music Company (DMC). The Accompanying music video for the song was directed by Vedad Jašarević.

Arranged by Seçkin Özer, "Yakışmaz" was written by Deniz Erten and composed by Emina Jahović. The lyrics of the pop-flamenco song revolve around the theme of love and grief. It is her third single in Turkish language. The Serbian version called "Nedostaješ" was also made available in April 2013. "Nedostaješ" was written and composed by Emina Jahović herself.

On 4 June 2013, she premiered her following single "Žena zmaj" on Ami G Show, a late-night talk show of RTV Pink. The song was also composed and written by Emina Jahović herself. The upcoming album that includes "Yakışmaz", "Nedostaješ", and "Žena zmaj" is planned to be released by in June 2013. To promote this album, it is scheduled that Jahović will attend the CMC Festival Vodice 2013. She will be the first artist from Serbia to appear as a special guest at this festival that will held on 14–15 June 2013 in Vodice, Croatia. Claiming that Emina is a genuine regional star and a great musical talent, Nikolina Mazalin, the organizer and creative director of the festival, noted that it is actually why Croatia Records decided to promote Emina's new album in Croatia.

== Elite Model Look ==
On 2 June 2013, Emina Jahovic performed her song "Nedostaješ" on RTV Pink's VIP Room 2013 at Elite Model Look final in Serbia.

== Music videos ==
Famous director Vedad Jašarević from Creative4D directed the accompanying music videos for "Yakışmaz" and "Nedostaješ". Critics noted costume references and artistic similarities to the work of Cheryl Cole.

== Release ==
Produced by Samsun Demir, the single "Yakışmaz" was released through Doğan Music Company (DMC) in May 2013.

== Track listing ==
No.	Title	Writer(s)	Producer(s)	Length
1.	"Yakışmaz"	Emina Jahović Sandal, Deniz Erten^{[a]}	Samsun Demir	4:23
2.	"Nedostaješ"	Emina Jahović Sandal		4:23

Notes

- ^{[a]} Indicates a lyricist

== Charts ==
Chart (2013)	Peak position
Turkey (Number One Charts)	3
