= Ana Štajdohar =

Serbian singer (born 1979)

Ana Štajdohar Ана Штајдохар
- Born: 24 November 1979 (age 46); Belgrade, SR Serbia, SFR Yugoslavia
- Genres: Pop; dance-pop
- Occupations: Singer; songwriter
- Instruments: Vocals, piano
- Years active: 2000—present
- Labels: City Records; PGP RTS
- Formerly of: Tap 011

Ana Štajdohar (Serbian Cyrillic: Ана Штајдохар, pronounced [ˌâna ˈʃtâjdoxar]; born November 24, 1979) is a Serbian singer. Having begun her career as a member of dance-pop group Tap 011, she is recognised for performing on late-night talk show Veče sa Ivanom Ivanovićem.

== Life and career ==
Ana Štajdohar was born on November 24, 1979, in Belgrade to parents of Slovenian descent. While vacationing in Hvar, Croatia with her family when she was only four years old, Štajdohar performed "Julie" by Danijel Popović at his gig, in response to which she received a standing ovation from both the crowd and Popović himself. She later started attending Mokranjac Music School and was a soloist to well known children choirs, such as "Kolibri" and "JNA", performing at their annual concerts in Sava Center.

Štajdohar rose to prominence when she joined Tap 011 with Nataša Guberinić as lead singers replacing Goca Tržan and Ivana Peters. With the group she went on to release two studio albums, Čudesna Ploča (Miraculous Record) in 2001 and 5 Element (Fifth Element) the following year. In 2008, Štajdohar, alongside Aleksa Jelić, appeared on Beovizija music festival with folk-oriented song "Beli jablan" (White Oak) in an attempt to compete as Serbia's entry for the Eurovision Song Contest. Although finishing as the runners-up, they were awarded for the best stage performance. Since 2010, Štajdohar has been performing on the late-night talk show Veče sa Ivanom Ivanovićem with her band. She has also served as back vocalist to artist such as Zdravko Čolić, Vlado Georgiev, Nataša Bekvalac and Saša Kovačević

In 2008, Štajdohar graduated with aa degree in Italian language and literature at the University of Belgrade Faculty of Philology. She is married to her band's saxophonist, Nikola Demonja, with whom she has a son and a daughter.

== Discography ==
Studio albums

- Psiholuks (2025)

Compilation albums

- Singles (2025)

Extended plays

- Tri boje zvuka (Live at RTS Studio 8, 2016) (2016)

Singles

- "Beli jablan" (Aleksa Jelić featuring Ana Štajdohar; 2008)
- "Quiero" (Aleksa Jelić featuring Ana Štajdohar; 2008)
- "Žute sandale" (2008)
- "Nisam tu" (2010)
- "Extra" (Cvija featuring Ana Štajdohar; 2011)
- "U mraku" (2011)
- "Neko kao ti" (2013)
- "Just to Be with You" (2013)
- "Nova godina" (with Dečji hor RTB; 2014)
- "Lilihip" (2015)
- "Samo ti" (2016)
- "Toplo hladno" (2018)
- "Deja vu" (2026)
