= Posle mene (song) =

Single by Emina Jahović

from the album Metamorfoza
- B-side: "Gospodine"; "Cool žena"
- Released: 2011
- Recorded: 2011; Bojan Dugić
- Genre: Pop
- Length: 4:19
- Label: City Records
- Songwriter: Emina Jahović Sandal
- Producer: Bojan Dugić

Emina Jahović singles chronology
"Gospodine" (2011)	"Posle mene" (2011)	"Kimse Yok Mu?" (2012)

Music video
- "Posle mene" on YouTube

"Posle mene" (English: After Me) is a song recorded by Serbian-Turkish recording artist Emina Jahović. It was released in 2011 through City Records. The song was written and composed by Emina Jahović. It was produced and recorded in Belgrade by Bojan Dugić (aka Bojan "Genius" Dugic), the Recording Academy's GRAMMY Awards voting member who worked with such best selling artists as Beyoncé, Britney Spears, Jay-Z, and Jennifer Lopez. "Posle mene" was premiered on 22 July 2011 on Prva Srpska Televizija's famous late night talk show Veče sa Ivanom Ivanovićem whereas the other guest of the show was the Deputy Prime Minister Rasim Ljajić, a close family friend of Emina Jahović.

The music video for "Posle mene" was shot in the summer of 2011, in Göcek, Fethiye. The video was directed by Miloš Nadaždin.
