= Marina Tadic =

Marina Tadic can refer to:

- Marina Tadić
- Eerie Wanda
