= Göcek Island =

Island in Turkey

Native name: Göcek Adası
- Location within Turkey

Geography
- Location: Mediterranean Sea
- Coordinates: 36°43′36″N 28°56′21″E

Administration
- Turkey
- İl (province): Muğla Province
- İlçe: Fethiye

Göcek Island is a Mediterranean island of Turkey.

Administratively the island is a part of Fethiye ilçe (district) of the Muğla Province at 36°43′36″N 28°56′21″E. The island faces Göcek a touristic town and a small port. The island is a natural breakwater and it protects Göcek from most of the winds. The length of the island (from north to south) is 2 kilometres (1.2 mi). Its distance to nearest coast (Anatolia) is about 700 metres (2,300 ft).

The island is uninhabited. But there are beaches in both the east and the west shore and there is a quay in the east shore (so called İncirli) for boat services from Göcek.
