= Jahović =

Jahović is a surname. Notable people with the surname include:

- Adis Jahović (born 1987), Macedonian footballer
- Emina Jahović (born 1982), Serbian singer
- Mirsad Jahović (Türkcan) (born 1976), Turkish basketball player, brother of Emina
