= Kimse Yok Mu? =

Single by Emina Jahović

Single by Emina Sandal
- A-side: "Kimse Yok Mu?"
- B-side: "I da mogu"
- Released: 2012
- Recorded: 2012; Bojan Dugić
- Genre: Dance-pop, R&B
- Length: 3:46
- Label: Doğan Müzik Company
- Songwriters: Emina Jahović Sandal, Mustafa Sandal
- Producer: Bojan Dugić

Emina Sandal singles chronology
"Posle mene" (2011)	"Kimse Yok Mu?" (2012)	"Yakışmaz" (2013)

"Kimse Yok Mu?" is a single recorded by Serbian-Turkish recording artist Emina Jahović. It was released in 2012 through Doğan Music Company (DMC), in collaboration with Yada Productions and Turkcell Müzik.

The song was written and composed by Emina Jahović and Mustafa Sandal, the leading pop star from Turkey. The lyrics revolve around Emina asking a man to go back to her. It is her second single in Turkish. The Serbian version called "I da mogu" was also made available in 2012.

On 27 February 2013, "Kimse Yok Mu?" won the 3rd Media Awards of OMU (Turkish: OMÜ 3. Medya Ödülleri) for Best Breakthrough Album. The 3rd Media Awards of OMU were held at the Atatürk Congress and Culture Center in Samsun.

"I da mogu" (2012)
A 30-second sample of Emina Jahović's "I da mogu" featuring the chorus sung by Emina Jahović in the range of B_{2} to C♯, backed by a synth marching beat. The song became an international hit single in the Southeastern Europe.

== Music videos ==
Miloš Nadaždin directed the accompanying music videos for "Kimse Yok Mu?" and "I da mogu". In these videos, Jahović is often referred to as the Turkish JLo since critics noted costume references and artistic similarities to the work of Jennifer Lopez.

== Croatia Records ==
As of 2012, due to Emina's association with the record label Croatia Records, the song "Kimse Yok Mu?" is the first non-Croatian song that has been broadcast on CMC which is the largest Croatian music channel and broadcast only Croatian music and music of Croatian production.

== Release ==
The single "Kimse Yok Mu?" was released through Doğan Music Company (DMC) in November 2012.

== Track listing ==
No.	Title	Writer(s)	Producer(s)	Length
1.	"Kimse Yok Mu?"	Emina Jahović, Mustafa Sandal^{[a]}	Bojan Dugić	3:46
2.	"I da mogu"	Emina Jahović	Bojan Dugić	3:46

Notes

- ^{[a]} Indicates a lyricist

== Charts ==
Chart (2012)	Peak position
Turkey (Number One Charts)	1
