= Vila (album) =

Studio album by Emina Jahović
- Released: May 21, 2009
- Recorded: 2008–2009
- Genre: Pop
- Label: PGP RTS
- Producers: Aleksandar Milić Mili, Dino Merlin, Emina Jahović, Goran Kovačić, Murat Çekem

Emina Jahović chronology
Radije Ranije (2005)	Vila (2009)	Metamorfoza (2014)

Singles from Vila
- 1. "Još ti se nadam (feat. Saša Kovačević)" Released: 10 December 2008; 2. "Pile moje" Released: 21 May 2009; 3. "Med (feat. Dino Merlin)" Released: 30 July 2009

Vila (trans. Fairy) is the third studio album by Serbian recording artist Emina Jahović, which was released on 21 May 2009, by PGP RTS. Because Jahović signed a contract with PGP RTS she was banned on RTV Pink, a famous Serbian TV network that supports artists from City Records which released Emina's first two albums.

== Background ==
Emina recorded the album over the past two years. She wrote the most songs by herself, except "Ne zaboravi" which is written and produced by Aleksandra Milutinović, who also worked on Emina's previous albums, and "Zver", which is co-written and co-produced by Dino Merlin. There is a duet with Dino on the album, "Med", which is written and produced by Emina. It is the only song that Dino ever sang that he hadn't written by himself. Emina said that she had written "Još ti se nadam" after she had broken up with Mustafa in 2006. She also said that she had chosen the name Vila for the album because she thinks that it's the best song she had ever written, so she wanted people to pay attention to it.

The song is a strong ballad about a woman who would like to be a fairy, but she isn't.

— — Emina Jahović, Blic,

== Release ==
The album was released through PGP RTS on 21 May 2009.

== Track listing ==
No.	Title	Writer(s)	Producer(s)	Length
1.	"Pile moje"	Emina Jahović, Ali Güven^{[a]}	Goran Kovačić, Murat Çekem	3:42
2.	"Dan za danom"	Emina Jahović	Aleksandar Milić Mili	4:06
3.	"Ne zaboravi" (featuring İzel)	Aleksandra Milutinović	Goran Kovačić	4:01
4.	"Vila"	Emina Jahović	Goran Kovačić	4:49
5.	"Med" (featuring Dino Merlin)	Emina Jahović		3:38
6.	"Aj"	Emina Jahović	Aleksandar Milić Mili	4:01
7.	"Nastavljamo dalje..."	Emina Jahović	Goran Kovačić, Murat Çekem	4:33
8.	"Zauvek"	Emina Jahović	Goran Kovačić	4:01
9.	"Još ti se nadam" (featuring Saša Kovačević)	Emina Jahović, Hatzigiannis	Aleksandar Milić Mili	3:27
10.	"Zver"	Emina Jahović^{[a]}, Dervišhalidović^{[a]}	Goran Kovačić, Murat Çekem	3:15
11.	"Vila 2"	Emina Jahović		4:16
Total length:				42:29

Notes

- ^[a] Indicates a co-composer
