= Serbian pop =

Serbian pop is the pop music scene of Serbia. From the 1940s until the 1980s, while Serbia was a constituent republic of Socialist Federal Republic of Yugoslavia, Serbian pop scene was a part of the SFR Yugoslav pop scene.

== Beginning of the pop music in Serbia ==
Pop music in Serbia existed before Second World War. It is known that in late 1920s guest of Serbian capital Belgrade was a famous singer and actress Josephine Baker which suggests that in Serbia there were many gramophone records of this style of music and similar music styles such as jazz. It also confirms the statement of the actress Ognjenka Het in the radio show of Radio Belgrade called Two white pigeons in 1986 and is also confirmed by other direct and indirect sources. While the first singer-songwriters appear in other parts of Yugoslavia in that time in Serbia were performed romances, starogradska muzika, and folk music by the singers Edo Ljubić, Fulgencije Vucemilović, Milan Timotić, Olga Jančevecka and others. Mijat Mijatović, Sofka Nikolić, Bora Janjić – Šapčanin mostly performed folk songs, sevdalinka, starogradska muzika, but sometimes they also performed pop music. Bora Janjić – Šapčanin recorded the cover of Hungarian schlager Sad Sunday.

== 1940s ==
Serbian pop music in this period was influenced by schlager music, chansons and canzonas. Vojin Popović is remembered as one of the pioneers of pop music in Serbia and Yugoslavia. He appears during the war with the song Ne brini majčice mila, but original performance of this song was not preserved. He released seven singles between 1953 and 1956 featuring different ensembles. One of the first composers of pop music was Darko Kraljić. His famous compositions include Zašto si pospan Čo, Čamac na Tisi, Hej momci mladi. Čamac na Tisi and Hej momci mladi belong to Serbian postwar music, while it is not certain when the song Zašto si pospan Čo was created. It is considered that the song was created before or during the Second World War.

Pop music has been on the sidelines with the arrival of communist authorities. Music was mostly performed at balls or could be heard through radios. Few people had gramophone or possibility to get it.

== 1950s ==
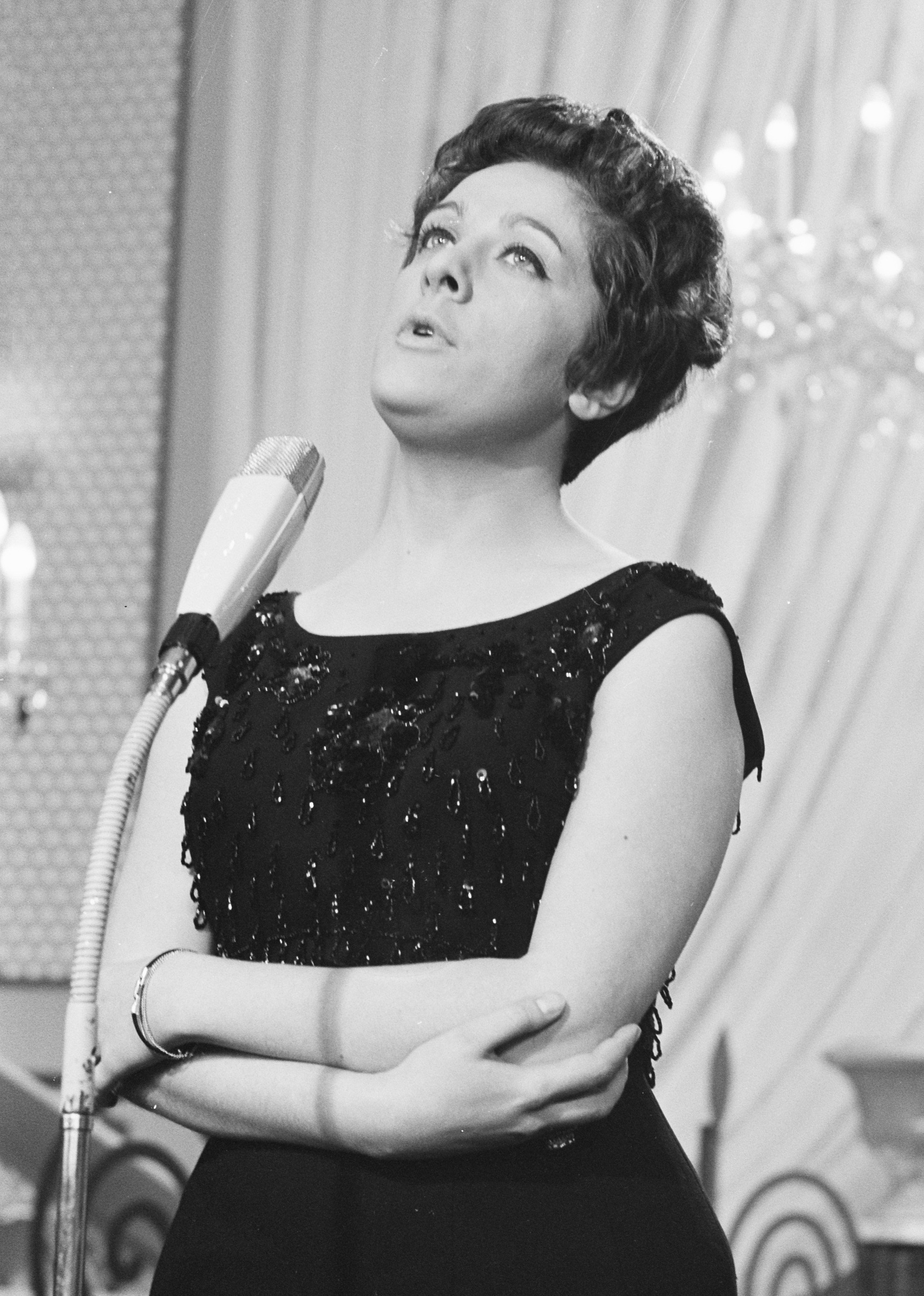
Lola Novaković

In the early 1950s decreased Soviet influence in Yugoslavia and it led to the first postwar musical wave in Yugoslavia – Mexican songs. Mexican movies became popular as well as song Mama Huanita from the movie Un día de vida.

The most famous musician of the early 1950s was drummer Spasa Milutinović. He mostly performed jazz music but also and pop music with his small musical group whose singers were Vojin Popović and Mara Janković. There are few surviving records, mostly by Jugodisk and Yugoton.

In the late 1950s appear new musicians such as Lola Novaković, Dušan Jakšić, Nada Knežević and very popular Đorđe Marjanović.

Lola Novaković was one of the most popular Yugoslav female singers of her time. She is remembered by the great number of wins on different festivals in Yugoslavia and Europe. In 1960 she became first Yugoslav musician to perform in Soviet Union. She also performed on the Near East and Japan. She released her first two songs in 1958 Alisa U Zemlji Čudesa and famous Cuban hit Babalu. After that she released significant numbers of singles, EPs and compilations.

Dušan Jakšić is notable by his numerous hits of which the most popular being Sve moje jeseni su tužne. Nada Knežević is the popular jazz and pop singer, she performed as the UN guest on Sinai Peninsula, and in jazz clubs in Germany and Scandinavia.

Đorđe Marjanović gained fame and numerous fans by appearing on television with the song Zvižduk u osam. Besides his long career in Yugoslavia, he made significant career performing in Soviet Union. He released 5 albums between 1959 and 1982: Muzika za igru (1959), Mustafa (1961), Prijatelji Zdravo (1967), Hvala vam prijatelji (1979) and Dvadeset nikad više (1982).

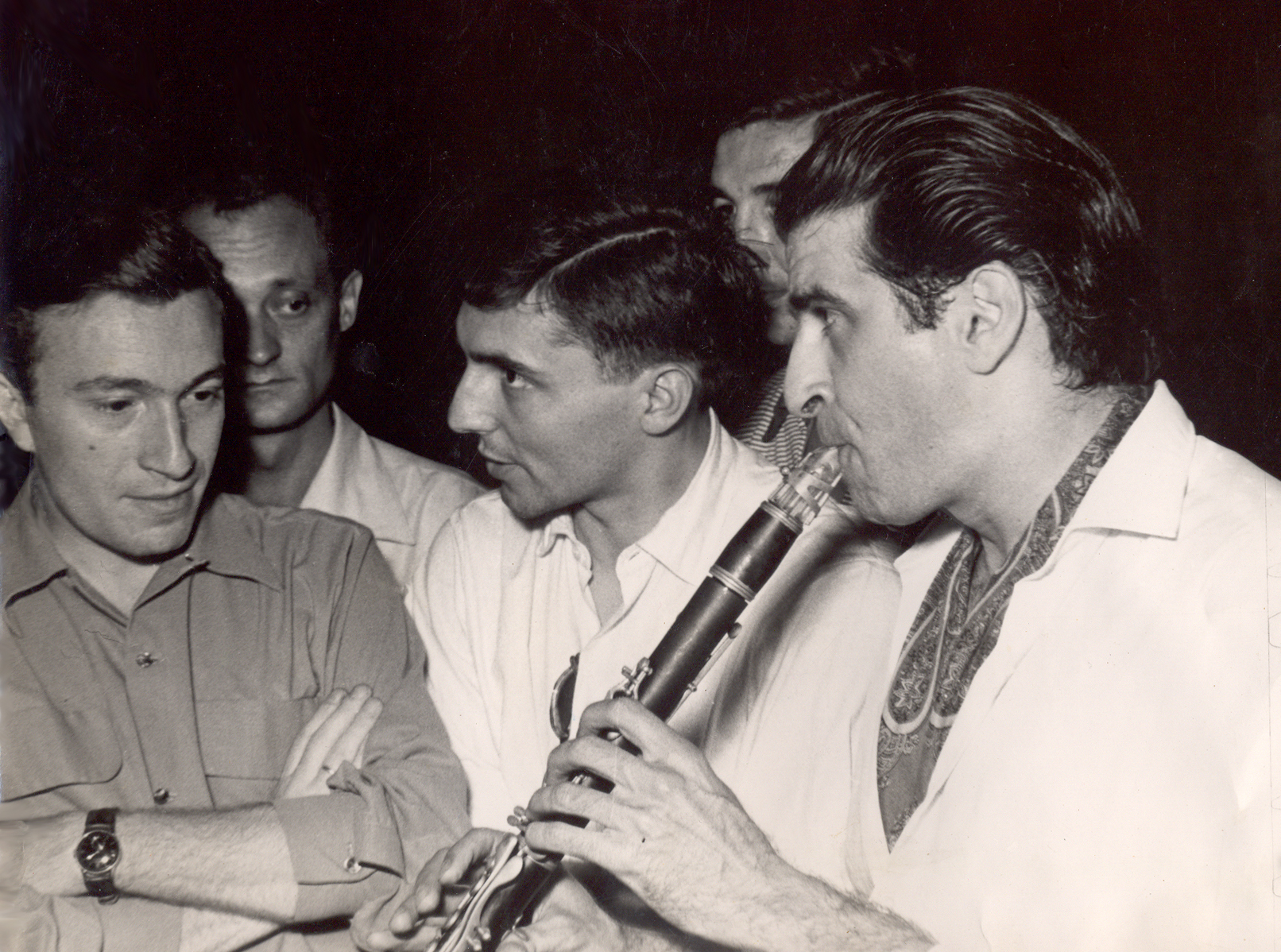
Mihailo Živanović (first left) and world-renowned clarinetist Tony Scott (first right).

In the same time was active Vokalni kvartet Predraga Ivanovića which the most famous song Pod sjajem zvezda appears in the Yugoslav movie Ljubav i moda. Cune Gojković, singer with diverse repertoire performed Mexican songs. Dragan Toković records Maria, Ne Budi Tužna in 1959. He is remembered for his pop and jazz compositions. Another significant figure of this period was Mihailo Živanović, composer, clarinetist, conductor and arranger.

== 1960s ==
The Sixties were a fruitful year for pop in Yugoslavia. Various festivals were set up across the country such as Belgrade Spring. They were being closely monitored and the great attention was paid on quality. Music has become available to anyone with the advent of television and mass phenomenon vinyl records. Singers maintained tours and solo concerts.

One of the most popular songs of the 1960s is Darko Kraljić's song Devojko mala, soundtrack from the movie Ljubav i moda sung by actor Vlastimir Đuza Stojiljković. Song later became popular in the Soviet Union.

A new group of singers appeared such as Dragan Stojnić, Ljubiša Bačić, Sedmorica mladih, Miki Jevremović, Ljiljana Petrović, Radmila Karaklajić, Tihomir Petrović, Krsta Petrović, Zafir Hadžimanov, Mirjana Beširević, Diego Varagić, Ivanka Pavlović, Leo Martin, Plavi Ansambl, Olga Nikolić, Slobodan Bob Đorđević, Senka Veletanlić, Vanja Stojković, Nena Ivošević, Rista Milovanović, Pera Dimitrijević, Ivana Nikolić, Daliborka Stojšić, Vera Pančić and others.

Notable to mention is also Croatian Serb singer-songwriter Arsen Dedić who remained popular to date with his chansons and great number of records.

In Belgrade were held popular igranke on Kalemegdan, Lazarevićeva, Mašinac and in the Belgrade Youth Center.

== 1970s, 1980s and 1990s ==
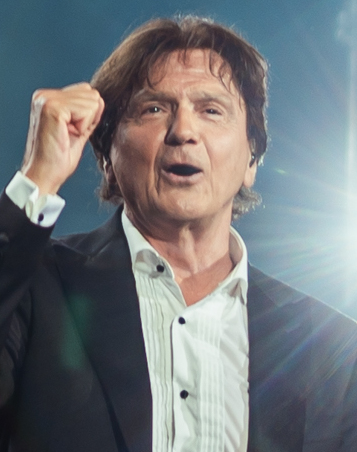
Zdravko Čolić

In 1970s and 1980s pop music began to lose its popularity due to the growing interest in rock music.

One of the biggest stars of Yugoslav and Serbian pop in the 1970s is Bosnian Serb singer Zdravko Čolić. Zdravko Čolić performed disco and pop music followed by his dance group Lokice. As of 2014 he recorded 14 albums with significant number of hits.

Boba Stefanović, Beti Đorđević and Vladimir Savčić Čobi with his group Pro Arte were another notable group of musicians during the 1970s.

Obraz uz obraz was a popular TV show of RTV Beograd hosted by actors Milena Dravić and Dragan Nikolić where most of the popular musicians of the time performed between 1972 and 1974.

The group Zana arrived on the pop scene in the 1980s with the song Dodirni mi kolena. Bebi Dol became famous with her songs Mustafa and Rudi and debut album Ruže i krv which was voted debut album of the year. Girl group Aska performed at the Eurovision Song Contest 1982 with the song Halo, halo. Maja Odžaklievska recorded the song Budi dobar, kao što sam ja.

In the turbulent years of the 1990s pop music fell into the shadow of Eurodance. Tap 011 was one of the most popular groups of the 1990s with their hits Zbog tebe, Bunda, Okreni broj 95, Plava... Kovač sisters duo, K2 worked with many producers worldwide and released five albums. New pop singers include Bajone, Cali4nia, Zorana Pavić, Gloria, Ceca Slavković, Bojan Milanović, Saša Vasić, Tanja Banjanin, Leontina Vukomanić, Ksenija Mijatović, Romana Panić.

== 2000s-present ==
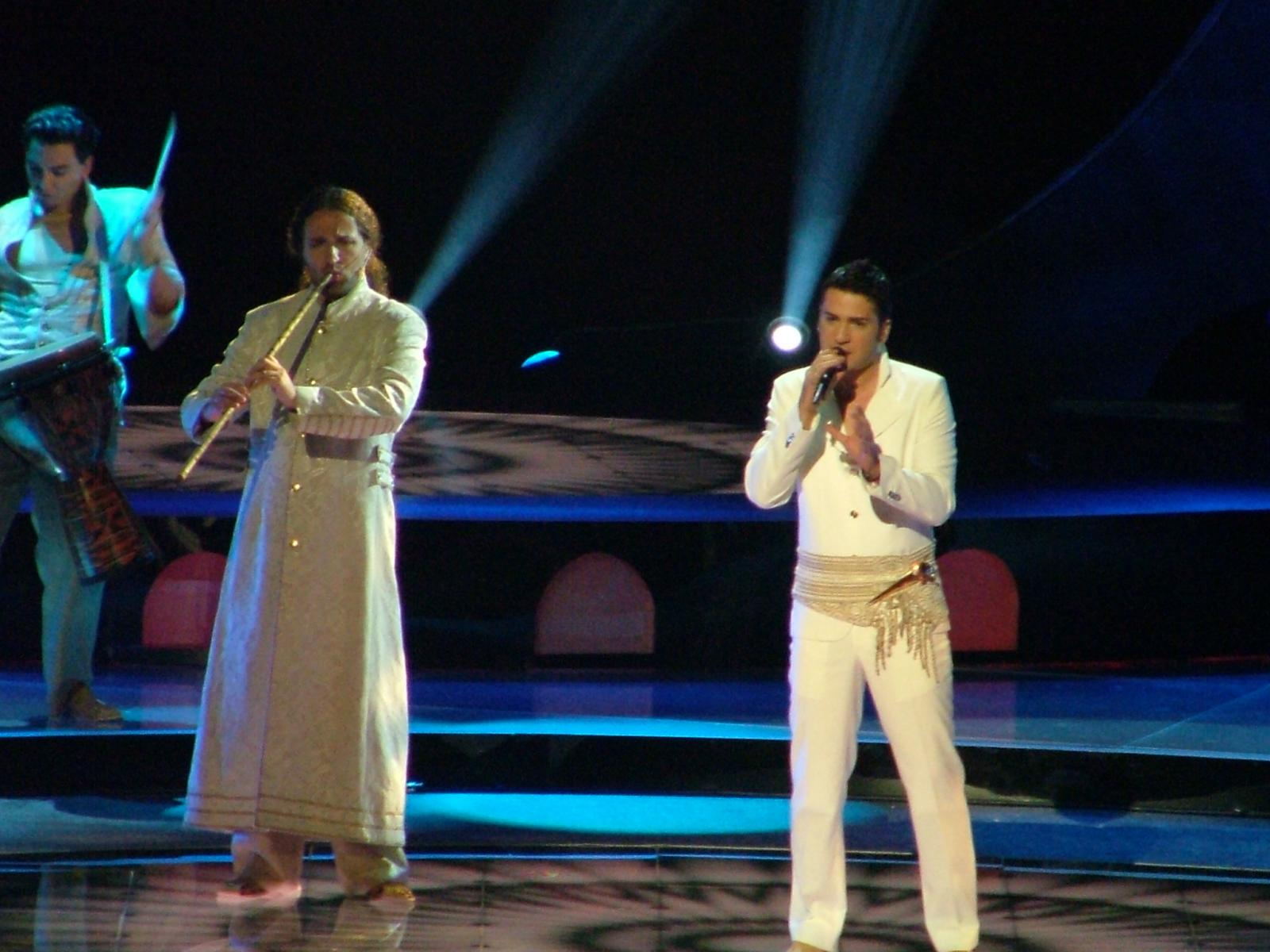
Joksimović performing "Lane Moje", ESC 2004

In the 2000s pop music increase its popularity with artist such as:

- Nataša Bekvalac
- Nevena Božović
- Vlado Georgiev
- Tijana Dapčević
- Emina Jahović
- Željko Joksimović
- Nikolija Jovanović
- Sara Jovanović
- Jelena Karleuša
- Aleksandra Kovač
- Kristina Kovač
- Saša Kovačević
- Dženan Lončarević
- Ana Nikolić
- Pretty Loud
- Aleksandra Radović
- Željko Samardžić
- Ana Stanić
- Marija Šerifović
- Ana Štajdohar
- Goca Tržan
- Jelena Tomašević
- Bojana Vunturišević

== Eurovision ==
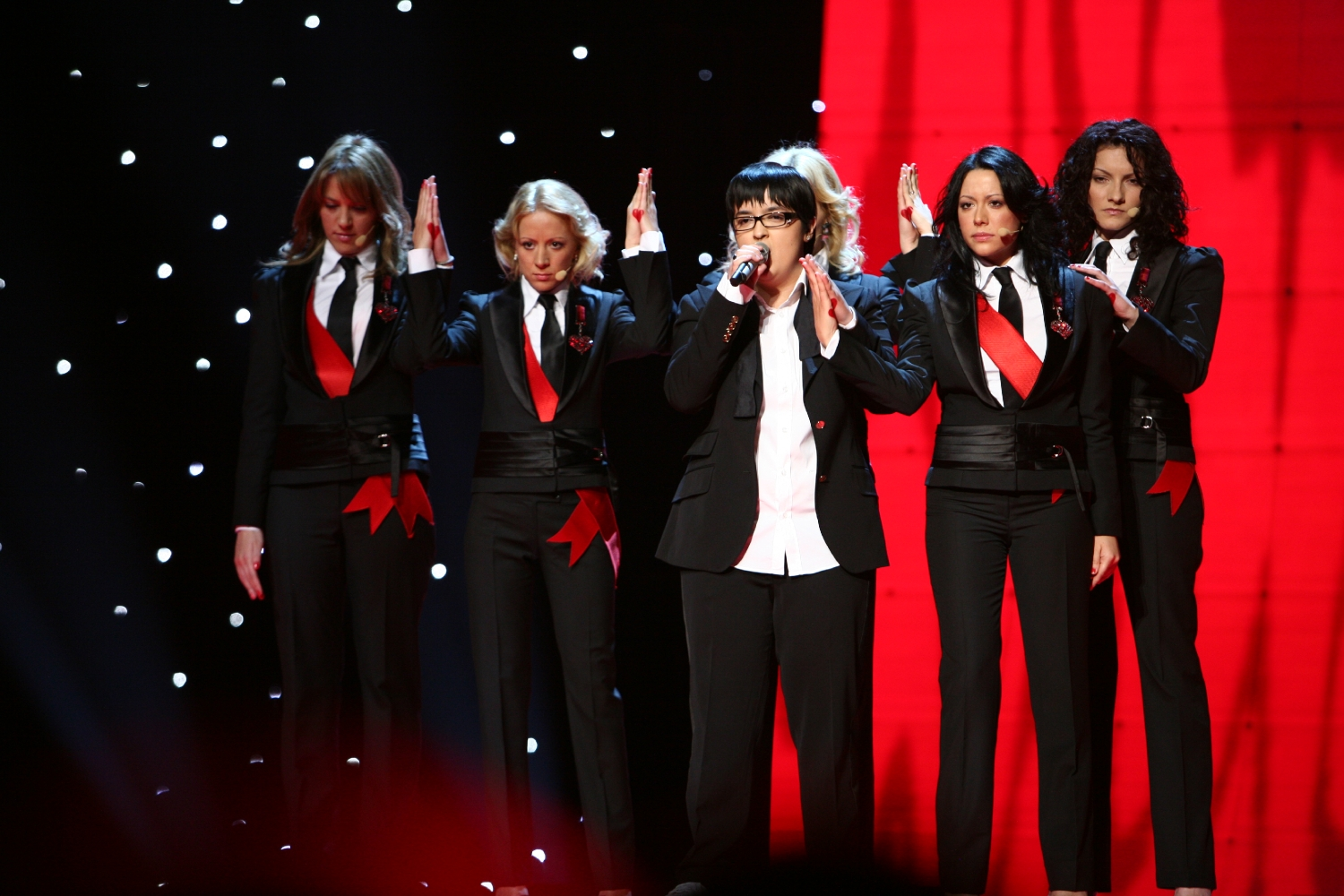
Marija Šerifović won Eurovision in 2007.

Serbian singers performed in Eurovision Song Contest as part of Yugoslavia and Serbia and Montenegro before Serbia's debut in 2007.

Lola Novaković achieved the first Yugoslav significant results at Eurovision winning 4th place in 1962 with the song Ne pali svetla u sumrak.

Željko Joksimović took the second place at the 2004 Eurovision Song Contest with the song Lane moje representing Serbia and Montenegro. In 2012, as Serbian representative, he came third with the song Nije ljubav stvar.

Marija Šerifović won the first place at the 2007 Eurovision Song Contest at Serbia's debut in the competition, and Serbia was the host of the 2008 contest in Belgrade Arena.

== See also ==
- Music of Serbia
- Popular music in the Socialist Federal Republic of Yugoslavia
