= Tap 011 =

Serbian pop group

- Origin: Belgrade, Serbia
- Genres: Pop, dance, power pop
- Years active: 1994 – 2002, 2011
- Labels: PGP-RTS; City Records
- Members: Ana Štajdohar; Nataša Guberinić; Milan Bojanić; Petar Stupar; Đorđe Pajović
- Past members: Ivana Pavlović; Goca Tržan; Mirko Vukomanović; Goran Stevanović; Gane Pecikoza
- Website: www.tap-011.com

Tap 011 was a Serbian pop group active from 1994 until their breakup in 2002, with a brief reunion in 2011. Tap 011's predecessor was the rap group Tapiri, consisting of Milan Bojanić, Đorđe "Đole" Pajović, Petar "Pera" Stupar and others. In 1994 Ivana Pavlović and Goca Tržan joined as vocalists and the band decided to switch to another music genre. They also started working with manager Gane Pecikoza who has remained their manager ever since. The group then shortened their name from 'Tapiri' to 'Tap', '011' referencing the area code for Belgrade, where they were all from.

== History ==
The Serbian pop band was formed in 1992 under the name Tapiri.

In 1994 they changed the name to Tap 011. Tap's first album, Novi Svet (New World), released in early 1995. This was followed by numerous concerts, awards, and frequent radio air-time. With the release of their second album, Gaće (Underpants), Tap 011 won many music awards and performed domestically and internationally in Germany, Switzerland, Austria, and France.

In 1999, Goca Tržan left the group, followed shortly by Ivana Pavlović's departure. Goca began a solo career, and Ivana formed her own band Negative. In the summer of 2000, almost a year and a half after the bombing of Yugoslavia, Milan, Pera and Djole re-assembled the band. The new singers were Ana Štajdohar and Natasa Guberinić. In 2001, they issued their fourth album Čudesna Ploča (Marvelous Disc), the first with the new lineup. In 2002, after releasing their last album, 5 Element, they broke up.

On April 1, 2011, they held a farewell concert at Štark Arena under the name Taprililili.

== Discography ==
=== Studio albums ===
- 1993 - Milenijum Posle Misterija I (Millennium After Mysteries I) (as Tapiri)
- 1995 - Novi Svet (New World)
- 1996 - Gaće (Underpants)
- 1998 - Igra (The Game)
- 2001 - Čudesna Ploča (Marvelous Disc)
- 2002 - 5 Element (5th Element)

=== Extended plays ===
- 1997 - Lesi

=== Singles ===
- 1993 - Funky Life
- 1993 - Tapir's Nightmare
- 1995 - Novi svet
- 1995 - Bunda
- 1995 - Hit
- 1995 - Gaće
- 1995 - Zbog tebe
- 1996 - Sanjaj Me
- 1997 - Lesi
- 1998 - Dosadan dan
- 1998 - Okreni broj 95
- 1998 - Igra
- 2000 - 011
- 2000 - Plava
- 2000 - Reka
- 2000 - Kapetan lađe
- 2002 - Playboy
