= Moj svijet (album) =

Studio album by Sergej Ćetković
- Released: October 16, 2015
- Studio: Various: Event Media Studios, (Belgrade); PopMark Studios, (Belgrade); Dimitar Dimitrov Studio, (Skopje)
- Genre: Pop
- Length: 60:56
- Label: City Records
- Producer: Various: Sergej Ćetković (exec.); Darko Dimitrov; Marko Milatović; Miroslav Lesić; Predrag Martinjak; Vladan Popović

Sergej Ćetković chronology
2 minuta (2010)	Moj svijet (2015)

Singles from Moj svijet
- 1. "Zbog nas" Released: April 11, 2012; 2. "Još volim te" Released: December 18, 2012; 3. "Moj svijet" Released: March 9, 2014; 4. "Novembar" Released: April 29, 2015; 5. "Korov" Released: October 12, 2015; 6. "Ne živim ja" Released: February 20, 2016; 7. "Reci da" Released: July 15, 2016

Moj svijet (Montenegrin: Мој свијет, English: My world) is the sixth studio album by Montenegrin recording artist Sergej Ćetković. It was released on October 16, 2015, by City Records and Croatia Records. The song of the same name represented Montenegro in the Eurovision Song Contest 2014 where it came nineteenth overall.

== Background ==
Ćetković's fifth studio album 2 minuta was released in February 2010 to positive reviews. In late 2010 Ćetković embarked on tour through Serbia to promote the album. In the first quarter of 2011, he promoted the album in his home country Montenegro and held concerts in Bosnia & Herzegovina and Croatia. Throughout the majority of 2011, Ćetković worked on his upcoming sixth studio album. He was collaborating with longtime producer Marko Milatović. In early 2012, the song "Zbog nas" was announced as the album's lead single.

== Release and promotion ==
On April 29, 2015, the single "Novembar" was released as a teaser for the upcoming sixth studio album. In an interview with CDM Ćetković stated how he has already picked a title for the album and how it will be titled Moj svijet. In July 2015, it was announced that he is putting final touches to the album with producer Miroslav Lesić. Ćetković also stated that the label is readying the album for a fall release. The album's lead single "Korov" was released a few days prior to the album, on October 12, 2015.

=== Singles ===
- "Zbog nas" was released as the album's first single on April 11, 2012. A music video for the song that was filmed in London was also released on the same day via Ćetković's official YouTube channel.
- "Još volim te", the album's second single, was released on December 18, 2013. The music video for the song was shot in Belgrade, Serbia and directed by Aleksandar Kerekeš
- "Moj svijet" was released as the album's third single and was internally selected to represent Montenegro at the Eurovision Song Contest 2014 in Denmark.
- "Novembar" was released on April 29, 2015, as the album's fourth single. It was written by Ćetković and produced by Thomas Thörnholm, Jovan Radomir and Miroslav Lesić. The music video was shot in Stockholm, Sweden and Belgrade, Serbia.
- "Korov" was released as the album's lead single on October 12, 2015. The music video was shot in the Italian region of Tuscany.
- "Ne živim ja" was released as the sixth single to promote the album Moj svijet. Its music video was released February 20, 2016.
- "Reci da" was released as the album's final single. The music video was shot on three locations in Serbia (Niš, Kraljevo and Pančevo). The video also included scenes of his fans.

== Commercial performance ==
In Croatia, Moj svijet debuted at number 1 on the Croatian Combined Albums Chart. In its second week, it stayed at number one, but slipped from number one to number two in its third week. It charted on the Combined Albums Chart until it was discontinued in late 2015. However, as the album was distributed by Croatia Records it was able to chart on the Domestic Albums Chart, where it held the number one position for two weeks. Moj svijet became his second studio to make an appearance on the Croatian Albums Chart, his first being 2 minuta.

== Track listing ==
All tracks are written by Sergej Ćetković except: track 13: music by Sergej Ćetković and lyrics by Sergej Ćetković and Emina Jahović.

No.	Title	Arranger(s)	Length
1.	"Samo me zagrli"	Darko Dimitrov	4:08
2.	"Zar je kraj?"	Vladan Popović	4:16
3.	"Ne živim ja"	Dimitrov	4:09
4.	"Korov"	Dimitrov	4:30
5.	"Dio života"	Dušan Alagić	5:08
6.	"Bolje nađi drugoga"	Miroslav Lesić	4:34
7.	"Daleko si"	Lesić	4:26
8.	"Mastilo"	Lesić	4:32
9.	"To nisi ti"	Popović	4:12
10.	"Reci da"	Lesić	4:28
11.	"Novembar"	Lesić; Jovan Radomir; Thomas Thörnholm	4:20
12.	"Još volim te"	Marko Milatović	4:15
13.	"Zbog nas"	Milatović	4:48
14.	"Moj svijet"	Milatović	3:06

== Charts ==
Chart (2014)	Peak position
Croatian Albums (HDU)	1

== Release history ==
Region	Date	Format	Edition	Label	Ref.
United States	October 16, 2015	Digital download	Standard	Croatia Records	
Worldwide	October 29, 2015	Digital download; CD	Standard	City Records	
