= Exhale (Emina Jahović song) =

Single by Emina Jahović
- A-side: "Exhale"
- B-side: "Push It"
- Released: June 18, 2008
- Recorded: 2008; Bojan Dugić
- Genre: Dance-pop, R&B, rap
- Label: Multimedia Records
- Songwriters: Bojan Dugić, Emina Jahović Sandal
- Producer: Bojan Dugić

Emina Jahović singles chronology
| "La gitana" (2007) | "Exhale" (2008) | "Još ti se nadam" (2008) |

"Exhale" is an international maxi single (CDM) recorded in New York City by Serbian-Turkish recording artist Emina Jahović. It was released on 18 June 2008 through Multimedia Records. Jahović's first maxi single in English, Exhale, was completely produced and recorded in the United States under the production wing of Bojan Dugić (aka Bojan "Genius" Dugic), the Recording Academy's GRAMMY Awards voting member who worked with such best selling artists as Beyoncé, Britney Spears, Jay-Z, and Jennifer Lopez.

The maxi single contained remix tracks by DJs, including Elvir Gazić and Levent Gündüz. The tracks "Push It" and "Push It (Remix)" feature American rapper Cory Gunz.

== World Sings Competition ==
The song "Exhale" was nominated for "World's Best Song" in Worldsings.com's music competition in which the top 20 most voted songs performed in Las Vegas, Nevada, U.S. for $1,000,000.

== Music video ==
On 19 April 2008, the accompanying video for "Exhale" premiered on the MTV Adria show TOP 20 which counts down the biggest videos in the localized version of the music and entertainment channel MTV Europe. Emir Khalilzadeh directed the video.

== Release ==
The album was released through Multimedia Records in 2008.

== Track listing ==
| No. | Title | Producer(s) | Length |
|---|---|---|---|
| 1. | "Exhale" | Bojan Dugić | 3:34 |
| 2. | "Exhale (Dance Remix)" | Bojan Dugić |
| 3. | "Exhale (Elvir Gazić Remix)" | Bojan Dugić |
| 4. | "Exhale (Levent Gündüz Be Funky Remix)" | Bojan Dugić |
| 5. | "Push It" (featuring Cory Gunz) | Bojan Dugić |
| 6. | "Push It (Remix)" (featuring Cory Gunz) | Bojan Dugić |
