= MC Yankoo =

- Born: 27 August 1981 (age 45); Vienna, Austria
- Genre: Hip-hop
- Occupations: Rapper; singer
- Years active: 2003–present

Aleksandar Janković (Serbian Cyrillic: Александар Јанковић; born 27 August 1981), professionally known as MC Yankoo, is an Austrian-born Serbian rapper. In 2014, he collaborated with Serbian vocalist Milica Todorović, for the song "Moje zlato" (My Precious), which was the first music video in Serbia to reach a hundred million views on YouTube.

== Career ==
His first contract at the age of 17 was unsuccessful. Further performances on the Balkan scene followed under the name Salex. In 2004, he toured Italy, Austria and Germany with his band LDT. Since 2008, he has been recording songs with MC Stojan and becoming more and more popular; the hits "Tvoje tange" (2010), "Ja volim Balkan" (2011; dance hit with Dado Polumenta and DJ Mlađa next to MC Stojan and him), "Kakva guza" (2011) followed. The song "Ne zovi me" (2011) reached position 10 on the iTunes Dance chart. One of his first recognized hits was "Shake 3x", a collaboration with Rene Rodriguez and DJ Antoine from 2012 then included in the Austrian list Ö3 Austria Top 40 (position 31); on the German charts, this song reached 63rd place; he has four more songs on the Austrian charts ("Loca" 44, "We Let It Burn" 48, "Around the World" 15, "I’m Coming for Your Soul" 57). The summer hit "Loca" was recorded in 2012 with DJ Mlađa.

In 2009, he founded his own music house, Yankoo Music.

== Discography ==
Singles

- "We Like to" (2010)
- "Tvoje tange" (2010)
- "'Ajmo" (2010)
- "Ne zovi me" [feat DJ Mladja] (2011)
- "Joj joj joj" (2011)
- "Ja volim Balkan" [feat Dado Polumenta, Dj Mladja & MC Stojan] (2011)
- "Sexy Shake" (2011)
- "Balkan Shit" [feat DJ Mladja] (2011)
- "Slatka mala" (2011)
- "Ti nisi prava žena" [feat Dado Polumenta] (2011)
- "Kakva guza" [feat MC Stojan] (2011)
- "Shake 3x" (2012)
- "Luda noć" [feat Olja Karleuša] (2012)
- "Loca" [feat DJ Mladja] (2012)
- "Afterparty" [feat Sha] (2012)
- "I Can't Get Enough" (2012)
- "Slatka mala veštica" [feat Darko Lazić] (2012)
- "We Let It Burn" (2013)
- "Ožiljak" [feat Muharem Redžepi] (2013)
- "Brate moj" (2013)
- "Chica Mia" (2013)
- "Ruža" [feat In vivo] (2013)
- "Zvuk" [feat Andrea] (2013)
- "Muzika" [feat Sha] (2014)
- "Heart for Orient" (2014)
- "Palim klub" [feat Darko Lazić] (2014)
- "Seksi dupe" [feat Cvija] (2014)
- "Uvek kad popijem" [feat DJ Shone & Dara Bubamara] (2014)
- "Around the World" (2014)
- "Moje zlato" [feat Milica Todorović] (2014)
- "Dalek put" (2014)
- "Can't Touch This" (2015)
- "Nije nije" (2015)
- "Drunk in Bangkok" (2015)
- "I'm Coming for Your Soul" (2015)
- "Brate" ("Nove Nike brate") (2016)
- "Godine" (2016)
- "Grand Slam" [feat Rene Rodrigezz & Merel Koman] (2016)
- "Drop It Low" (2016)
- "Ljubi me budalo" [feat Milica Todorović] (2017)
- "Moj grad" (2017)
- "Abu Dabi" [feat Cvija] (2017)
- "Crna udovica" (2017)
- "Gas" (2017)
- "Go your way" (2017)
- "64" (2017)
- "Ti odlaziš ja ostajem" [feat Dinna] (2018)
- "Frankfurt Beč" (2018)
- "2110" (2018)
- "Neka gori sve" (2018)
- "Balkan Mädchen" (2018)
- "Ista si ko sve" [feat Cvija] (2019)
- "Fake" (2019)
- "Ma Bella" (2019)
- "Ona bi to" [feat Cvija] (2019)
- "Amajlija" (2019)
- "Noćne kraljice" (2019)
- "Sve žene vole" [feat MC Stojan] (2019)
- "Neka traje" [feat Alexandra Matrix] (2019)
- "Balkan san" [feat Connect] (2020)
- "Telenovela" [feat Luna Djogani] (2020)
- "Suga Suga" [feat DJ Bobby B. & Jacky Jack] (2020)
- "Baby Tranquilo" [feat DJ Bobby B., Jacky Jack & Sashka Janx] (2020)
- "Bestseller" (2021)
- "Balkaner in Alemania" (2021)
- "Chica Chica" (2021)
- "Rompe Diskotheka" (2021)
- "MAMA MIA" (2021)
- "Sinoć se pilo" (2022)
- "Mash Up" [feat Ajay] (2022)
- "Made in Balkan" (2022)
- "Trošim pare" [feat Hi Babo & Jacky Jack] (2022)
- "Šiki Miki" [feat Hi Babo] (2022)

Compilations

- Sexy Selection (2011)
- Electro Hypes Vol. 1 (2013)
- Electro Hypes 3 (2015)
- iDance 11 (2015)
- Push Play for Electro 3 (2015)
