= Callimache =

Port town of ancient Caria

Coordinates: 36°45′23″N 28°56′48″E

Callimache or Kallimache (Ancient Greek: Καλλιμάχη) was a port town of ancient Caria. The Stadiasmus Maris Magni mentions the town as being 50 stadia from Daedala.

Its site is located near modern Göcek in Asiatic Turkey.
