= Ne valjam =

2010 album by Nataša Bekvalac

Studio album by Nataša Bekvalac
- Released: November 12, 2010
- Recorded: 2009–2010
- Genre: Pop
- Label: City Records; IDJTunes
- Producer: Dejan Abadić; Aleksandar Milić Mili; Aleksandar Kobac

Nataša Bekvalac chronology
Stereo ljubav (2004)	Ne valjam (2010)	Original (2016)

Singles from Ne valjam
- 1. "Dve u meni" Released: February 2010; 2. "Ne valjam" Released: October 2010

Ne valjam (English: I'm Not Good) is the fourth studio album by Serbian singer Nataša Bekvalac. It was released in November 2010 under City Records. Ne valjam was announced on 26 September 2010 during Bekvalac's 30th birthday party. The album includes twelve tracks of predominately pop music. Ne valjam was sold in two series of 50,000 copies.

== Promotion ==
The album was promoted with a performance of the song "Čistija" on Serbian MTV in December 2010, which saw a memorable altercation between Bekvalac and the show's host, actor Sergej Trifunović, caused by Trifunović's "inappropriate" introduction. An accompanying music video was released for the title track.

== Track listing ==
Credits adopted from Discogs.

Ne valjam track listing
No.	Title	Writer(s)	Length
1.	"Nikad ne reci nikad"	Dragiša Baša; Dejan Abadić	3:42
2.	"Ne valjam - Part I"	Ninoslav Ademović; Marina Tucaković; Žika Jakšić; Aleksandar Milić Mili	3:53
3.	"Prva u piću"	Ademović; Tucaković; Milić	3:44
4.	"Ne kuni se u svoje drugove"	Dragan Brajović Braja; Abadić	3:27
5.	"Mrlja"	Brajović; Abadić	4:16
6.	"Ljubav nije za jedanput"	Ademović; Tucaković; Abadić	3:20
7.	"Ja još uvek verujem"	Brajović; Abadić	3:45
8.	"U meni su dve"	Baša; Abadić	4:00
9.	"Ne valjam - Part II"	Milić; Tucaković; Ademović	3:31
10.	"Čistija"	Thanos Paparikolau; Dimitris Kontopoplus; Tucaković; Aleksandar Kobac	3:13
11.	"Sve što želiš biću ja"	Milić; Brajović; Ademović	3:29
12.	"Mala leđa"	Kobac; Tucaković; Aleksandar Perišić Romario	3:08
Total length:			43:36

== Release history ==
List of regions, release dates, showing formats and label
Country	Date	Format	Label
Serbia	November 12, 2010	Compact disc	City Records
Various	May 10, 2021	Digital download; streaming	IDJTunes
