= Milica Todorović =

Serbian singer and actress (born 1990)

- Милица Тодоровић
- Born: 13 October 1990 (age 35); Kruševac, SR Serbia, SFR Yugoslavia
- Occupations: Singer; actress
- Years active: 2005–present
- Height: 1.70 m (5 ft 7 in)
- Children: 1
- Musical career
- Genres: Pop-folk; turbo-folk
- Instrument: Vocals
- Label: Grand Production

Milica Todorović (Serbian: Милица Тодоровић; born 13 October 1990) is a Serbian singer and actress. After winning the second season of Zvezde Granda in 2005, she released her debut album, Pamtim ja (2009). Todorović is known for the songs "Tri čaše" (2013), "Moje zlato" (2014) with MC Yankoo and "Limunada" (2016) with Emina Jahović. With over 185 million views, "Moje zlato" is currently her most-viewed music video on YouTube.

Apart from singing, Todorović starred as Azra in the opera Time of the Gypsies, directed by Emir Kusturica, which debuted at the Opéra Bastille, Paris in June 2007. She also made a cameo performance of the popular Serbian folk song "Jutros mi je ruža procvetala" in the movie An Ordinary Man (2017), starring Ben Kingsley. As of 2025, Todorović lives in Belgrade.

== Discography ==
- Pamtim ja (2009)

== Filmography ==
Filmography of Milica Todorović
Year	Title	Role	Genre	Notes	Ref.
2005	Zvezde Granda	Herself	Television	Season 2, contestant (winner)	
2015	Neki novi klinci	Herself	Television	Season 1 judge	
2017	An Ordinary Man	Singer	Film		
2023	Pevačica	Daša	Television	Season 2 lead character	

== Awards and nominations ==
List of awards and nominations of Milica Todorović
Year	Award	Category	Nominee/work	Result	Ref.
2019	Music Awards Ceremony	Collaboration of the Year	"Limunada" (Emina ft. Milica Todorović)	Nominated	
2019	Music Awards Ceremony	Music Video of the Year	"Limunada" (Emina ft. Milica Todorović)	Won	
2020	Music Awards Ceremony	Folk Song of the Year	"Avet" (feat. Mirza Selimović)	Nominated	
