= Marina Tadić =

Serbian pop-folk singer and actress (born 1983)

Marina Tadić Марина Тадић
- Born: 29 June 1983 (age 42); Valjevo, SR Serbia, SFR Yugoslavia
- Genres: Pop; pop-folk
- Occupations: Singer; actress
- Instrument: Voice
- Years active: 2008–present
- Labels: City Records; Grand Production; IDJTunes; Imperia

Marina Tadić (Serbian Cyrillic: Марина Тадић; born 29 June 1983) is a Serbian singer and actress from Valjevo. She made her recording debut in 2008 with the album Nisi bio tu, which was followed by two more albums - Bol za bol (2012) and U zagrljaju tvom (2018). Her hit songs include "Otrove" and "Bol za bol".

In addition to music, Tadić had a recurring role in the third season of the television series Budva na pjenu od mora.

== Personal life ==
Tadić was born on June 29, 1983 in Valjevo, SFR Yugoslavia. She has shown interest in music and acting arts since her childhood and was a member of school drama classes. Tadić graduated from the Faculty of Sport and Physical Education at the University of Novi Sad and had worked as a gym teacher before pursuing a career in music.

Over the years, Tadić has been romantically linked with former water polo player and minister of sport, Vanja Udovičić, and retired football player, Ivica Dragutinović.

== Discography ==
Studio albums

- Nisi bio tu (2008)
- Bol za bol (2012)
- U zagrljaju tvom (2016)

== Filmography ==
Filmography of Marina Tadić
Year	Title	Role	Genre	Notes	Ref.
2012-14	Folk	Herself	Television	Cameo appearance	
2015	Budva na pjenu od mora	Niki de Napoli	Television	Season 3	
2016	Neki novi klinci	Herself (judge)	Television	Season 2	
