= Sergej Ćetković =

Montenegrin singer

Sergej Ćetković Сергеј Ћетковић
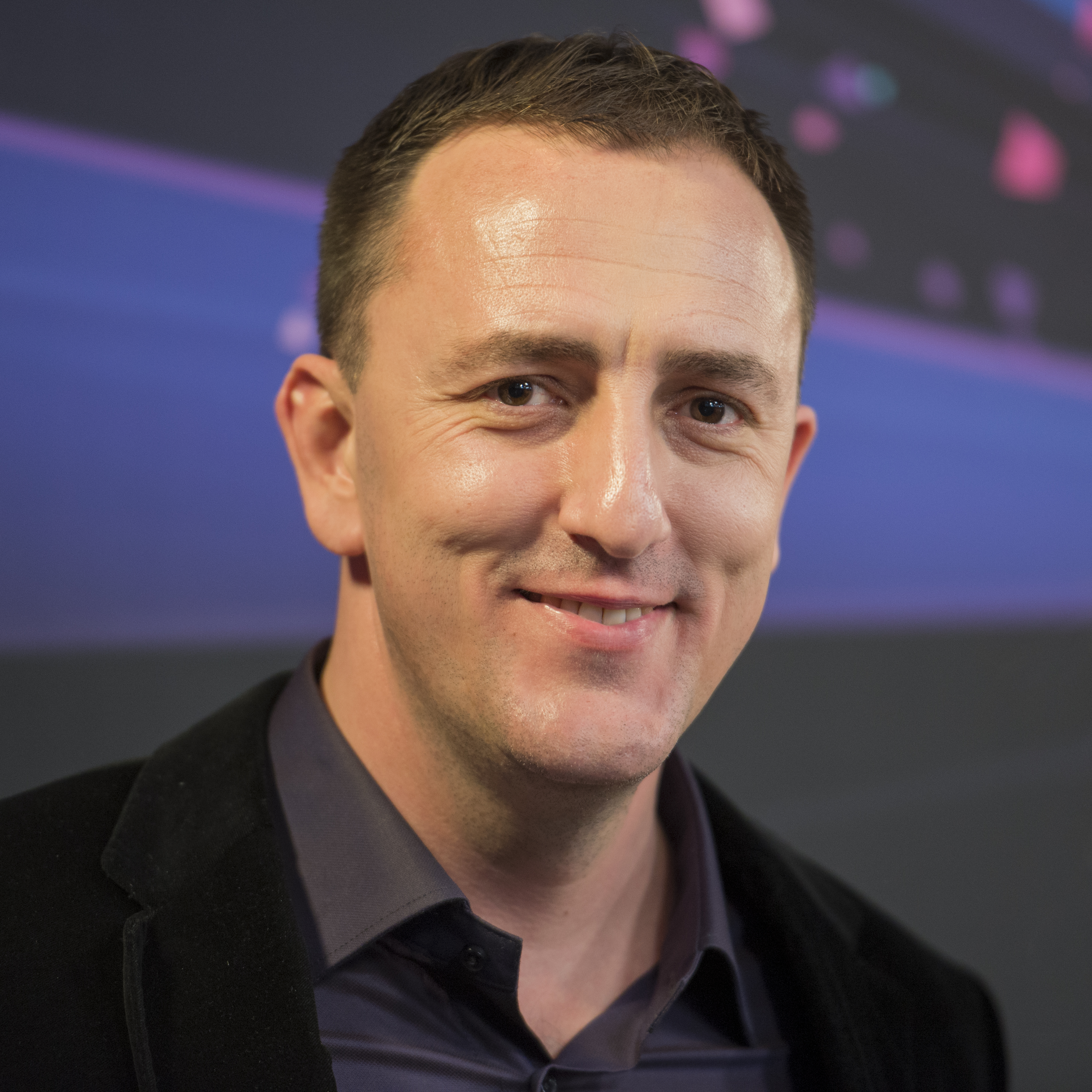
- Sergej Ćetković in 2014

Background information
- Born: Sergej Ćetković; 8 March 1976 (age 50); Titograd, SR Montenegro, SFR Yugoslavia
- Occupation: Singer
- Instrument: Vocals
- Years active: 1998–present
- Label: Goraton
- Website: sergejcetkovic.me

Sergej Ćetković presenting himself, 2014.

Sergej Ćetković (Montenegrin: Сергеј Ћетковић) (pronounced [sěrɡeːj tɕêtkoʋitɕ], born 8 March 1976) is a Montenegrin singer based in Belgrade, Serbia. He represented Montenegro in the Eurovision Song Contest 2014.

== Biography ==
Ćetković was born in Podgorica, SR Montenegro, Yugoslavia on 8 March 1976.

On 19 November 2013, he was chosen to represent Montenegro at the Eurovision Song Contest 2014 with the song "Moj svijet". This entry was the first from his country to qualify for the final, finishing in 19th place in a field of 26.

In 2017, Ćetković composed original music for the Serbian documentary series Istine i laži, the Serbian adaptation of Argentine television series Graduados. In 2018, he created and composed the song for Serbian animated series Lola and Mila, inspired by his adopted daughters.

== Discography ==
=== Studio albums ===
- Kristina (2000)
- Budi mi voda (2003)
- Kad ti zatreba (2005)
- Pola moga svijeta (2007)
- 2 minuta (2010)
- Moj svijet (2015)
- Kofer (2024)

=== Compilations ===
- The Best Of... (2005)
- Sergej Live (2006)
- Balade (2011)

=== Soundtrack ===
- Pogledi u tami - A View from Eiffel Tower (2005)

== Awards and nominations ==
Year	Award	Category	Nominee(s)	Result	Ref.
2001	Montefon Awards	Male Pop Singer of the Year	Himself	Won	
2007	Montefon Awards	Most Complete Musical Personality	Himself	Won	
2020	Naxi Zvezda	Male Singer of the Year	Himself	Won	
2020	Music Awards Ceremony	Pop Collaboration of the Year	"Pusti probleme" (feat. Who See)	Won	
2022	Naxi Zvezda	Outstanding Contribution to Music	Himself	Won	
2024	Naxi Zvezda	Male Singer of the Year	Himself	Won	
2024	Montefon Awards	Male Singer of the Year	Himself	Won	
2025	Naxi Zvezda	Album of the Year	Kofer	Won	
2025	Naxi Zvezda	Music Collaboration of the Year	"Storia" (with Milan Bujaković and Dušan Alagić)	Won	

Awards and achievements
Preceded by Vlado Georgiev	Serbian Oscar Of Popularity; The Male Pop Singer of the Year; 2011	Succeeded by None
Preceded by Who See with "Igranka"	Montenegro in the Eurovision Song Contest; 2014	Succeeded by Knez with "Adio"
