= Nataša Bekvalac =

Serbian singer (born 1980)

Nataša Bekvalac Наташа Беквалац
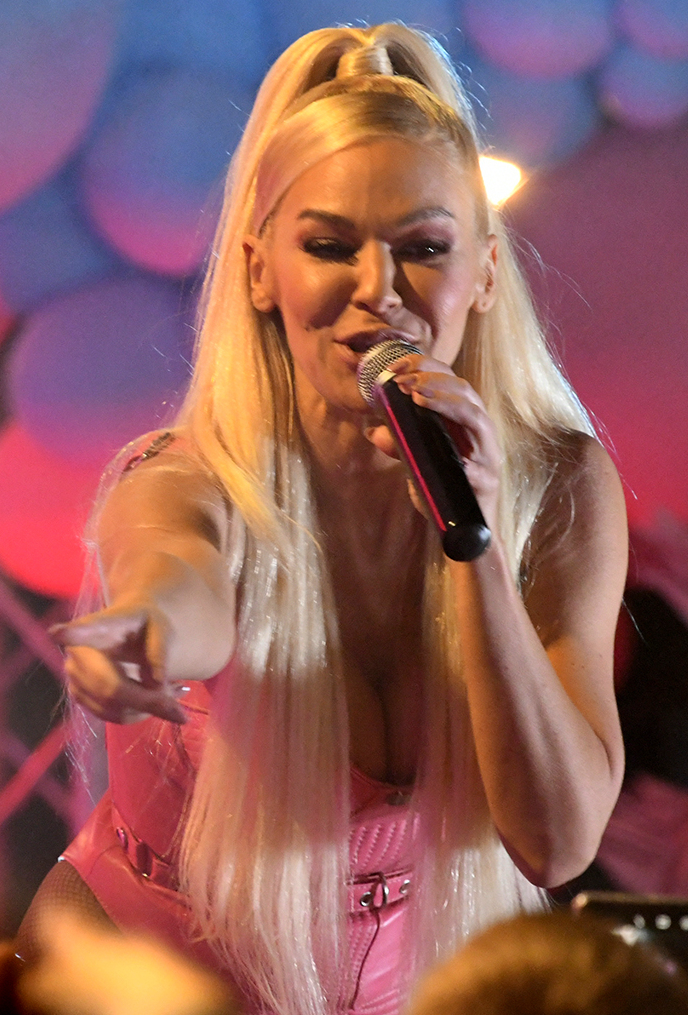
- Bekvalac at the Belgrade Pride, 2021

Background information
- Born: 25 September 1980 (age 45); Novi Sad, SR Serbia, Yugoslavia
- Genres: Pop
- Occupations: Singer; actress; model
- Instrument: Vocals
- Years active: 1998–present
- Labels: City Records; IDJTunes
- Spouses: Danilo Ikodinović (m. 2006; div. 2011) Ljubomir Jovanović (m. 2015; div. 2017) Luka Lazukić (m. 2017; div. 2019)
- Website: natasabekvalac.rs

Nataša Bekvalac (Serbian Cyrillic: Наташа Беквалац; pronounced [nǎtaʃa bekʋǎːlats]; born 25 September 1980) is a Serbian singer. Nicknamed the "Barbie of Novi Sad" (Serbian: новосадска барбика / novosadska barbika), she began her professional music career in 2001 with the release of her debut album Ne brini. To date, she has recorded six studio albums, and in 2020 she held her first headlined concert at the Belgrade Arena. Additionally, she has served as a judge on the singing competition shows, Pinkove Zvezdice (2018–2019) and IDJ Show (2023–present).

== Early life ==
Bekvalac was born on 25 September 1980 in Novi Sad, SFR Yugoslavia. She is the daughter of footballer and coach, Dragoljub Bekvalac, and Mira. Bekvalac grew up as the middle child with two sisters, Dragana and Kristina. In 1989, she performed with the Bosnian band Regina at the children's music festival Deca pevaju hitove. The following year, Bekvalac also appeared on the popular variety show hosted by Minja Subota, called Mužički tobogan. Before pursuing a career in music, she graduated from a senior coaching school.

== Career ==
At 17 years of age, Bekvalac made her professional debut at the 1998 Beogradsko proleće festival with the song "Mojoj ljubavi". Her first album, titled Ne brini, was released in 2001 under City Records. The song "Laži me" was presented a year prior at the pop music festival Sunčane Skale in Herceg Novi. Ne brini was followed by Ništa lično (2002) and Stereo ljubav (2004), which included stand-out hits like "Mali signali", "Nikotin" and "Ponovo".

In November 2010, Bekvalac released Ne valjam. Between 2011 and 2014, she released a series of singles, including "Gospodine" (2011) with Emina Jahović, "Pozitivna" (2012), "Kraljica novih ljubavi" (2013) and "Mogu da prođem" (2014). Bekvalac performed alongside other artists like Ceca and Kiki Lesendrić at the 2014 New Year's Eve concert in front of the House of the National Assembly. Her fifth album, Original, was released in June 2016. It was preceded by the singles "Original" and "Pseto" a year before. In 2016, Bekvalac also made her theater debut, starring as Queen Draga Mašin in the musical Tajna Crne ruke. In 2018, she was a judge on the fifth season of the children's music competition Pinkove Zvezdice. Later in November, Bekvalac collaborated with Coby on the single "Mala plava". It was followed by "Neprijatelj", featuring Magla Band in December.

On the Valentine's Day 2020, she held her first solo concert in the Belgrade Arena, entitled S.O.S. za ljubav (S.O.S. for Love). In June 2020, Bekvalac performed a live stream concert via Serbian streaming service YouBox, which attracted close to 100,000 viewers. During the live show she was joined by her childhood musical influence, Bebi Dol. Bekvalac paired up with Rasta for the single "Iz daleka" in July 2021. In September 2022, she embarked on an American tour, where she had six shows performing mainly for Serbian diaspora. Bekvalac joined the judging panel of the music competition IDJ Show for its second season in September 2023.

On 14 October 2025, Bekvalac released her album Mama (Mom) under IDJTunes. It served as a reflection on her love life and family. The last track on the album, titled "Izlečena", is believed to be the last song written by late Marina Tucaković.

== Public image ==
In public surveys, Bekvalac has been cited as one of the most successful public figures from Novi Sad.

Recognized for publicly supporting LGBT rights in Serbia, she received the title of the Serbian gay icon in 2019. During 2021, she advocated for the legalization of same-sex partnerships in Serbia. Later that year, Bekvalac served as 2021 Belgrade Pride's "godmother", where she stated that she is not an ally to the community, but a "part of it".

== Personal life ==
Bekvalac has also received widespread media attention because of her personal life. She has been married three times and has two daughters. In 2004, she started dating Serbian waterpolo player Danilo Ikodinović. They married in July 2006. The couple welcomed their daughter Hana on 17 March 2007. After five years of marriage, Bekvalac divorced Ikodinović in 2011.

Between 2015 and 2017, she was married to handball player Ljubomir Jovanović. Subsequently, she married IT entrepreneur Luka Lazukić. Bekvalac gave birth to her second daughter, named Katja, on 28 February 2018. On the night of April 12, she was physically assaulted by her then husband. In April the following year, Lazukić was charged for domestic assault and was sentenced to eight-month suspended prison sentence. Bekvalac filed for divorce from Lazukić in October 2019.

== Discography ==
=== Studio albums ===
- Ne brini (2001)
- Ništa lično (2002)
- Stereo ljubav (2004)
- Ne valjam (2010)
- Original (2016)
- Mama (2025)

=== Live albums ===
- S.O.S. za ljubav (Live at BG Arena) (2020)

=== EPs ===
- Ljubav, vera, nada (2008)

=== Non-album singles ===
- Šta ću ja (2011) (with Ogi Radivojević)
- Bolesno te volim (2013)
- Crta (2017)
- Mala plava (2018) (with Coby)
- Neprijatelj (2018) (with Magla Band)
- Dođi mami (2019)
- Muško više ne mogu (2019) (with Emina Jahović)
- Iz daleka (2021) (with Rasta)
- Tajne (2022)
- Prevaranti (2023) (with Saša Matić)
- Nemir (2024) (with Relja Popović)

=== Compilations ===
- The Best of Nataša Bekvalac (18 najboljih) (2005)
- The Best of Nataša Bekvalac (2009)
- Platinum Collection (22 hita) (2011)
- The Platinum Collection (5 albuma) (2013)
- The Best of Collection (2017)

== Awards and nominations ==
List of awards and nominations of Nataša Bekvalac
Award	Year	Category	Nominee/work	Result	Ref.
Oskar Popularnosti	2011	Female Pop Singer of the Year	Herself	Won	
Music Awards Ceremony	2020	Music Video of the Year	"Dođi mami"	Won	

== See also ==
- Music of Serbia
- List of singers from Serbia
- Serbian pop
