= Darko Radovanović =

Darko Radovanović Дарко Радовановић
- Born: 21 September 1975; Novi Sad, SR Serbia, SFR Yugoslavia
- Died: 11 June 2011 (aged 35) Dobanovci, Belgrade, Serbia
- Genres: Pop-folk, Pop-rock, Pop, Disco
- Occupation: singer
- Years active: 1999–2011
- Label: City Records

Darko Radovanović (Serbian Cyrillic: Дарко Радовановић; 21 September 1975 – 11 June 2011) was a Serbian singer popular in Serbia and the other former Yugoslav republics.

Radovanović died on 11 June 2011, together with his manager, Aleksandar Milošević, in a traffic accident on the bypass around Belgrade, near the village of Dobanovci. He was buried on 14 June 2011 at the New Cemetery in Sremska Mitrovica.

Radovanović recorded a duet with Ivana Selakov "Ako je do mene" which was a big hit in 2009. The greatest hits of his career are songs like "Da mi je", "Ako je do mene", "Sanjam te", "Dukat", "Vreme da se rastaje" and "E moja ti".

== Discography ==
- Darko Radovanović (2005)
- Dosije (2007)
- Dukat (2010)
