= Mia Borisavljević =

Mia Borisavljević Миа Борисављевић
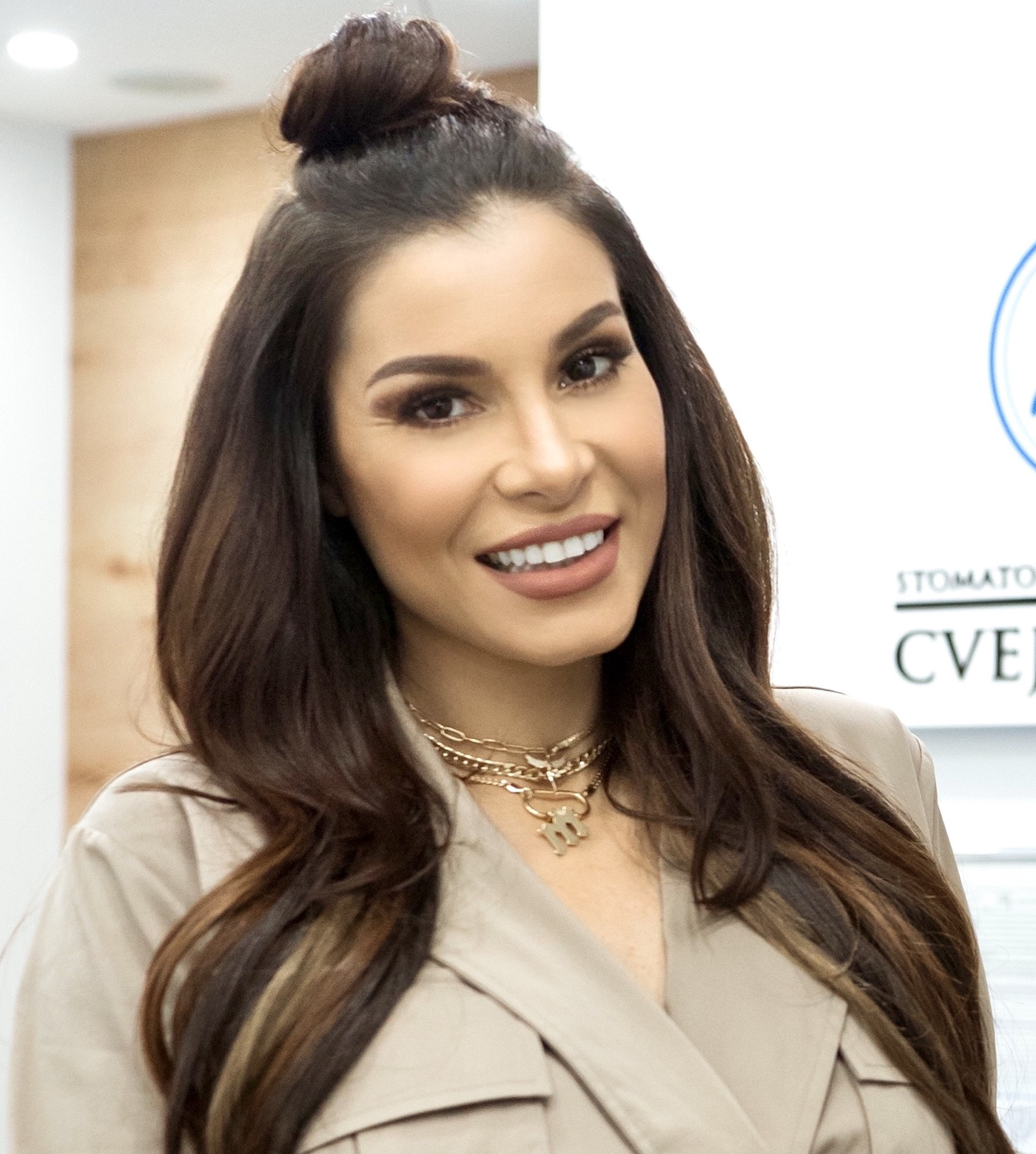
- Borisavljević in 2021

Background information
- Born: Mirjana Borisavljević; 8 June 1984 (age 42); Valjevo, SR Serbia, SFR Yugoslavia
- Genres: Pop-folk
- Occupations: Singer, television personality
- Instrument: Vocals
- Years active: 2002–present
- Labels: Grand; City Records; IDJTunes

Mirjana Borisavljević (Serbian Cyrillic: Мирјана Борисављевић, born 8 June 1984), better known as Mia Borisavljević, is a Serbian singer and television personality. Born in Valjevo, she started performing professionally at the age of seventeen and released her debut self-titled album in 2008 under Grand Production. Over the years, Mia has released two more studio albums: Moj Beograde (2013) and Jedna ja (2019), as well as several standalone singles.

Additionally, she competed on the reality television show Veliki Brat All Stars (2009) and served as the co-host on the singing competition Pinkove Zvezde (2016).

Borisavljević married fellow singer Bojan Grujić in July 2022. The couple has two daughters, born in March 2018 and July 2021.

== Discography ==
Studio albums

- Mia (2008)
- Moj Beograde (2013)
- Jedna ja (2019)

== Filmography ==
Filmography of Mia Borisavljević
Year	Title	Genre	Role	Notes
2009	Seljaci	Television	Violeta	1 Episode
2009	Veliki Brat All Stars	Television	Herself	Contestant, 8th place
2013	Folk	Television	Herself	1 Episode
2016	Pinkove Zvezde	Television	Herself	Presenter
