= Goca Tržan =

Serbian singer (born 1974)

Goca Tržan Гоца Тржан
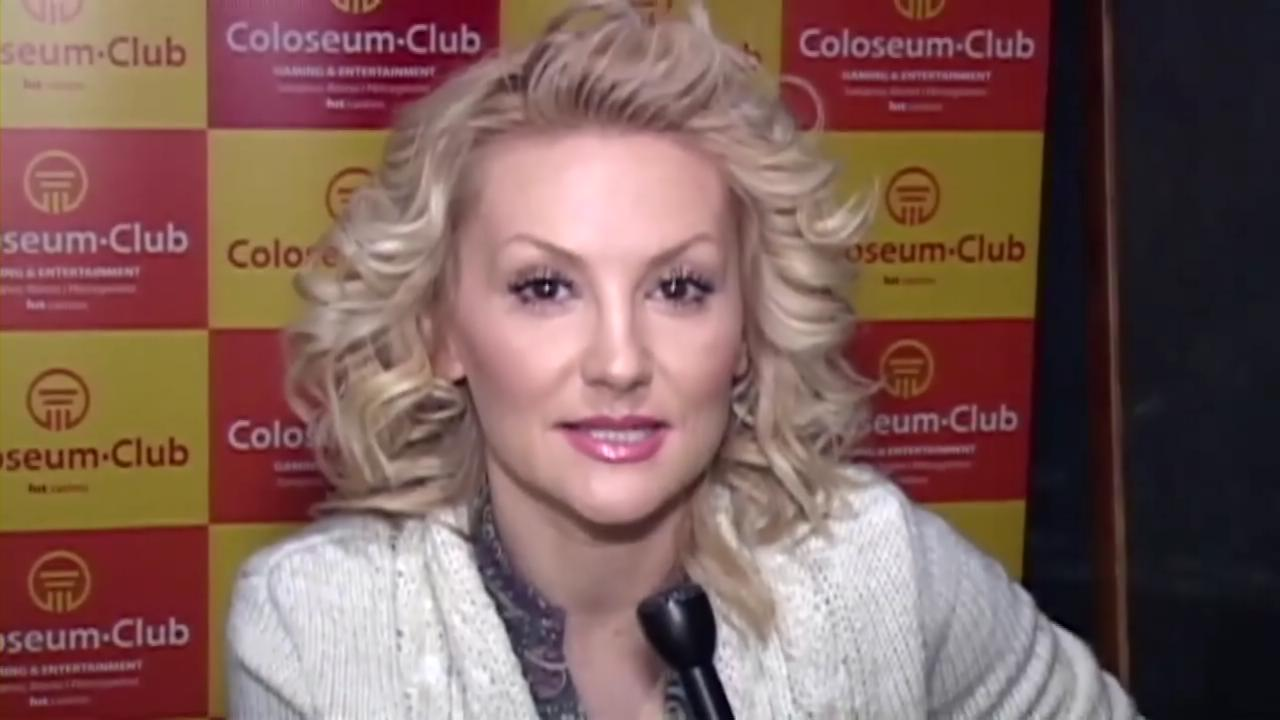
- Tržan in 2013

Background information
- Born: Gordana Tržan; July 8, 1974 (age 52); Belgrade, SR Serbia, SFR Yugoslavia
- Genre: Pop
- Occupation: Singer
- Instrument: Vocals
- Years active: 1995–present
- Labels: PGP-RTS; City Records
- Formerly of: Tap 011

Gordana "Goca" Tržan (Serbian Cyrillic: Гордана "Гоца" Тржан, pronounced [ɡǒːtsa tr̩̂ʒan]; born 8 July 1974) is a Serbian singer.

== Career ==
Tržan rose to prominence as a member of the Belgrade-based group Tap 011, which was formed in 1994. After four albums released with the group, in 1999, she pursued a solo career. Her debut album, U niskom letu was released in 1999 under PGP-RTS. In 2001, Tržan held a concert at Sava Centar in Belgrade, which was famously attended by one male admirer who bought all the tickets. She performed at the venue again in March 2009. Tržan has collectively released five studio albums and has also had numerous standalone singles, including "Voleo si skota" (2013), "Gluve usne" (2014), "Pozovi ga ti" (2015), "Gradske kučke" (2015) and "Lažna krila" (2016).

Beyond her music career, she had a recurring role in the television series Selo gori, a baba se češlja. In 2010, Tržan also appeared on Survivor Srbija VIP: Philippines, where she made it to top four. Furthermore, she served as a judge on the children's singing competition Pinkove Zvezdice (2014-2019).

== Personal life ==
Tržan has a daughter Lena Marinković (b. 2007) with former husband and reality TV personality, Ivan Marinković.

On 20 September 2015, she married drummer Raša Novaković.

== Discography ==
Studio albums

- U niskom letu (1999)
- Želim da se promenim (2001)
- Peta strana sveta (2002)
- Otrov u čaj (2004)
- Plavi ram (2008)

== Filmography ==
Filmography of Goca Tržan
Year	Title	Genre	Role	Notes
2008	Plesom do snova	Television	Herself	
2009-10	Selo gori, a baba se češlja	Television	Jorgovanka	7 episodes
2009	Selo gori i tako...	Television	Jorgovanka	
2010	Survivor Srbija VIP: Philippines	Television	Herself	4th place
2014	The Nut Job	Film	Lana (voice)	Serbian dub
2014	Tvoje lice zvuči poznato 1	Television	Herself	6th place
2014-2019	Pinkove Zvezdice	Television	Herself (judge)	
2015	Alvin and the Chipmunks: The Road Chip	Film	Ms. Price (voice)	Serbian dub
2017	Coco	Film	Mamá Imelda (voice)	Serbian dub
2018	Lola i Mila	Television	Maca papučarica (voice)	
2018	Hotel Transylvania 3: Summer Vacation	Film	Three witches (voice)	Serbian dub
2020-present	Moj savršen brak	Television	Herself	
2020-present	Goca Show	Television	Herself (host)	
2022-present	Ako progovorim	Television	Herself (host)	

== See also ==
- Music of Serbia
- Serbian pop
