= Göcek, Fethiye =

Göcek
- Neighbourhood
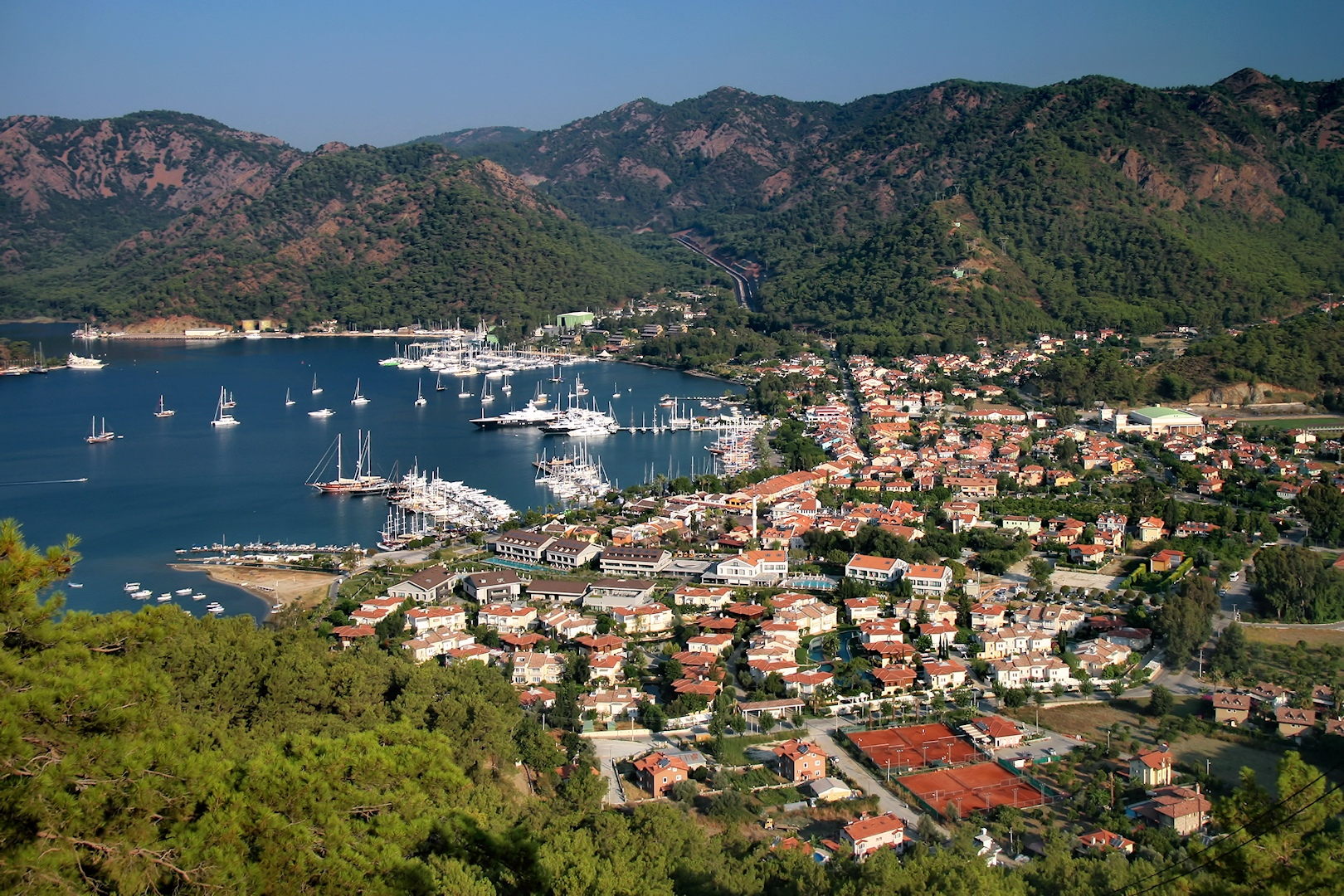

- Location within Turkey Location within Turkey Aegean
- Coordinates: 36°45′25″N 28°56′40″E
- Country: Turkey
- Province: Muğla
- District: Fethiye
- Elevation: 5 m (16 ft)
- Population (2022): 4,987
- Time zone: UTC+3 (TRT)
- Postal code: 48300
- Area code: 0252

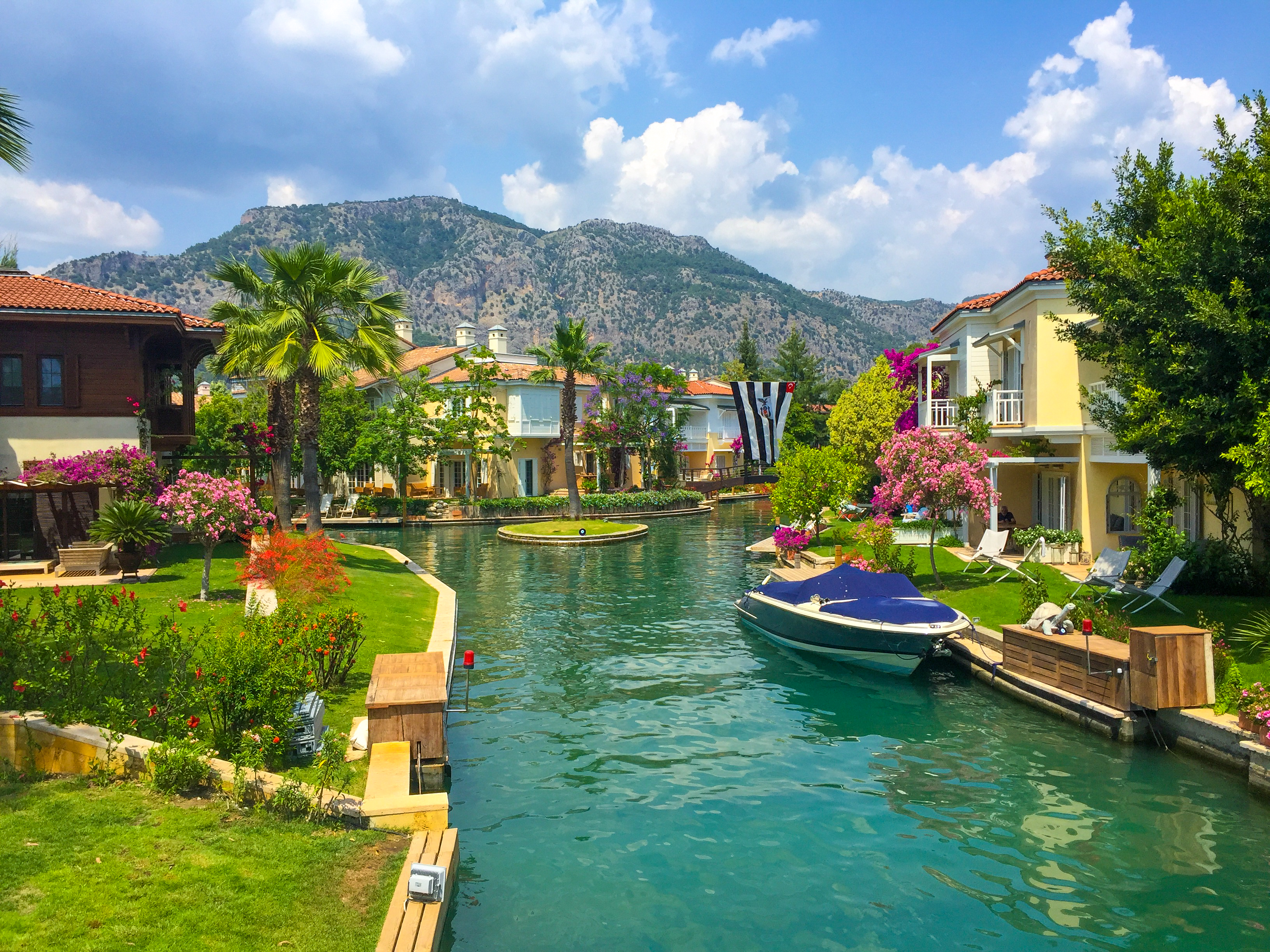
Göcek Harbor residential area

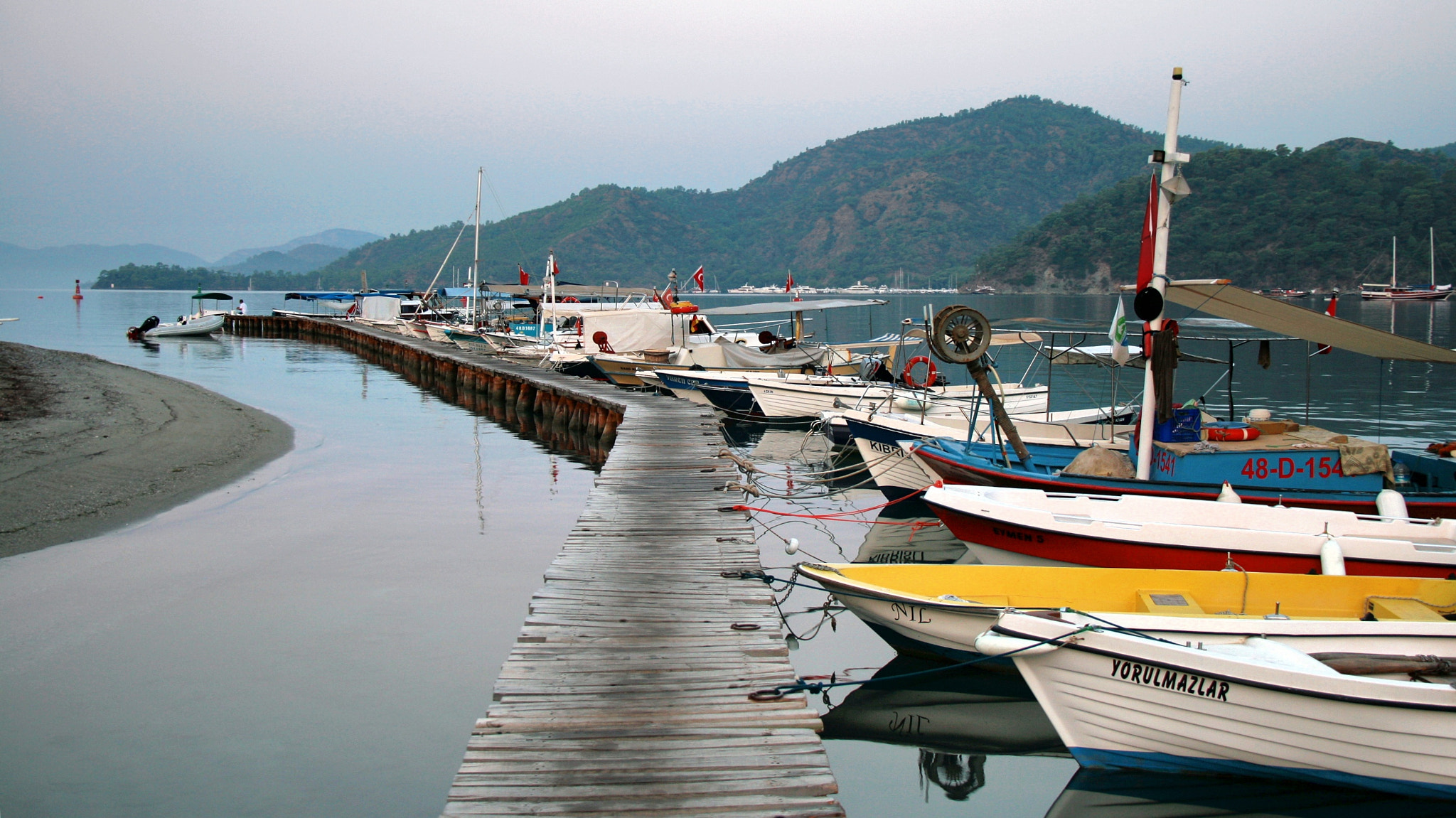
Göcek Marina

Göcek (Turkish pronunciation: [ɟœˈdʒek]) is a neighbourhood of the municipality and district of Fethiye, Muğla Province, Turkey. Its population is 4,987 (2022). Before the 2013 reorganisation, it was a town (belde).

The town was previously known as Callimache in ancient times and is located between Fethiye (referred to as Telmessos in ancient times) and Dalyan (referred to as Caunos in ancient times). According to local legend, it is in the Göcek area that Icarus landed in the sea after his flight trying to escape from the tower where he was imprisoned. Göcek was used as a harbor for ships loading chrome ore collected from the mines under nearby mountains during the Ottoman period.

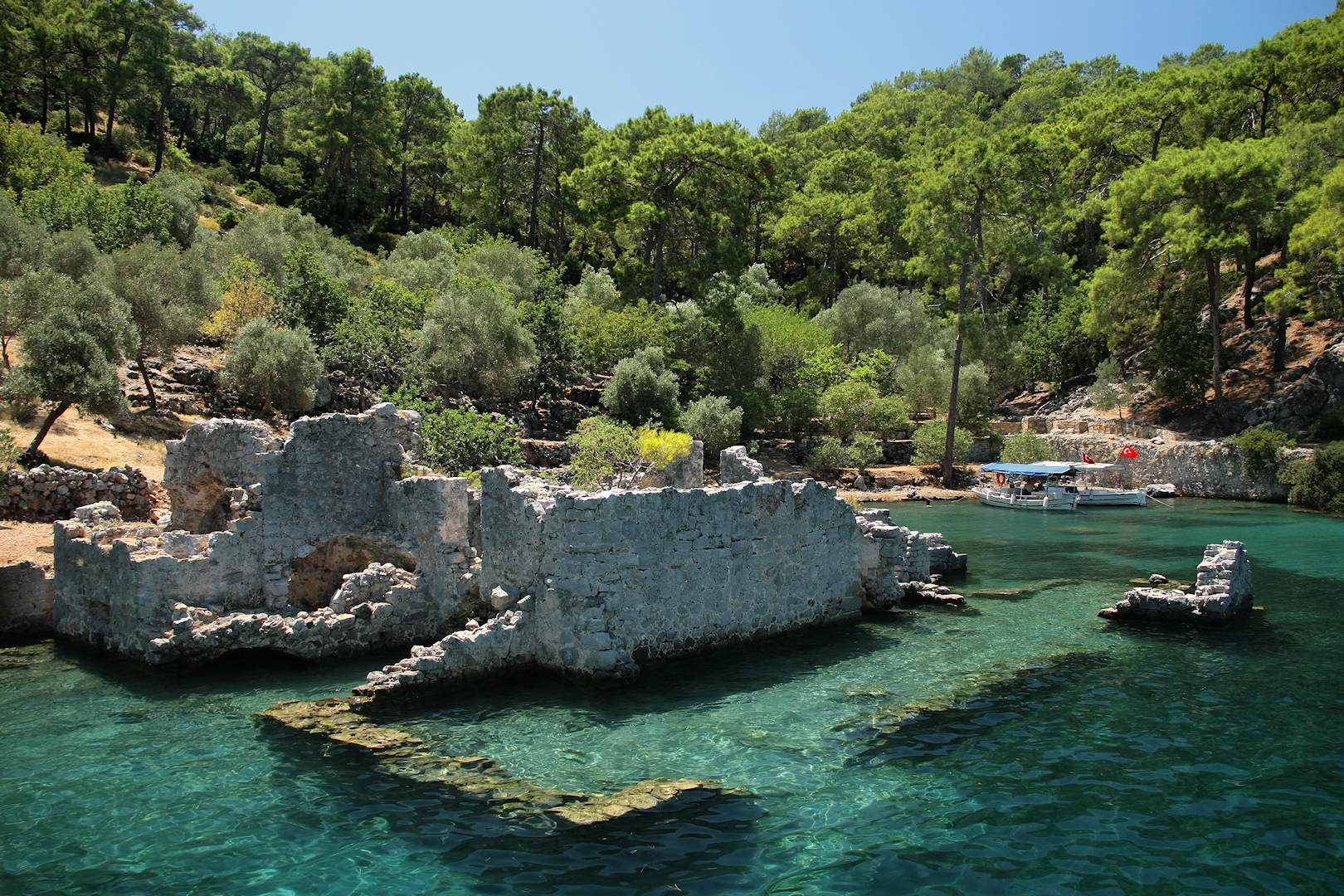
Cleopatra Hamam

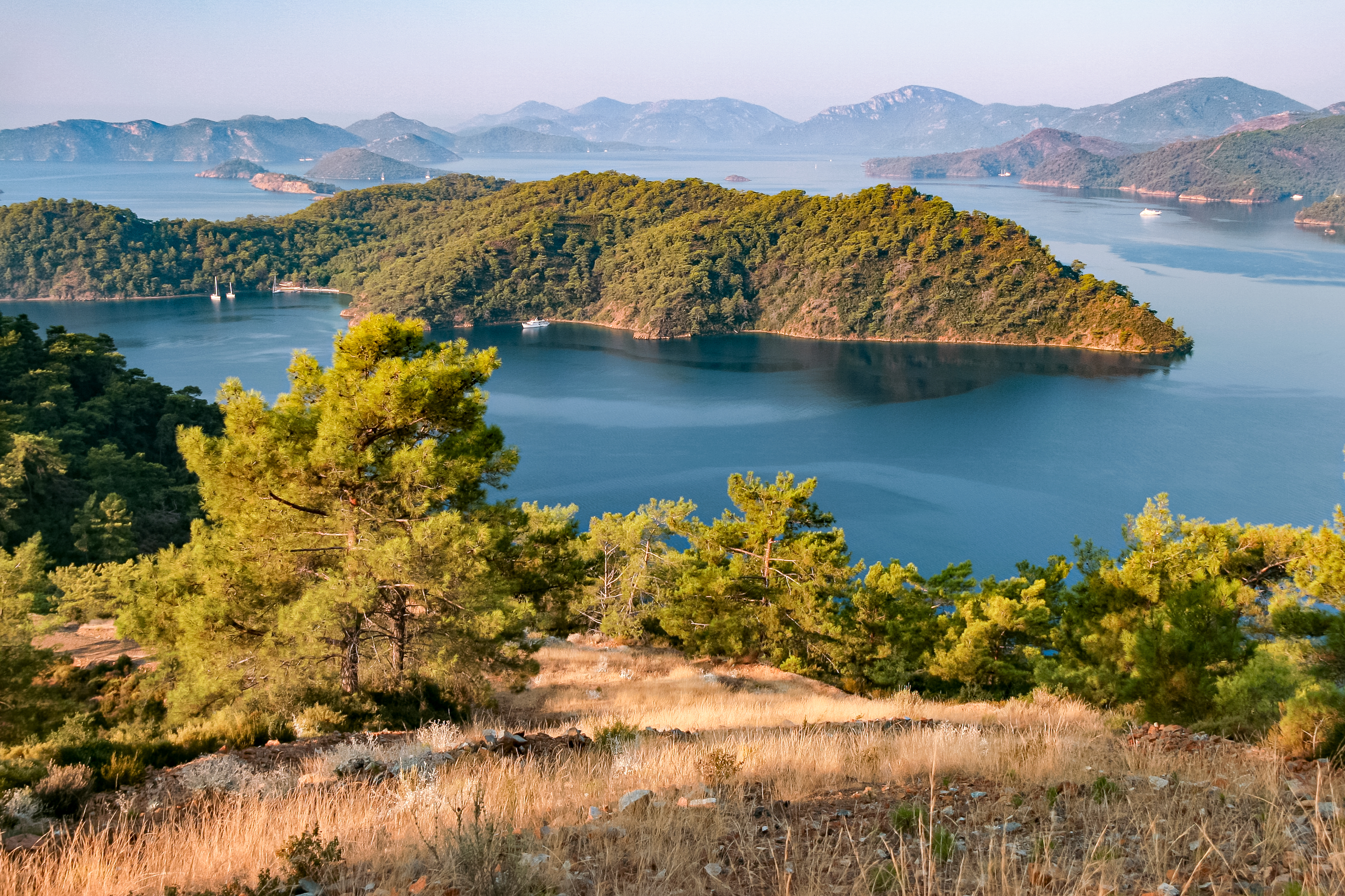
Tülütepe in Göcek

Today, Göcek hosts six significant marinas that serve yacht tourism in the region: Club Marina, Skopea Marina, Municipality Marinas, Marinturk Göcek Village Port, Marinturk Göcek Exclusive, and D-Marin Gocek. The town is known for its islands and coves located in a large and secluded bay which incentivizes yacht tourism. In 1988, Göcek was declared a Registered Area of Special Protection. Therefore, multi-story buildings are not allowed. The tourist accommodation facilities are two-storied hotels, motels, apartment hotels, and pensions situated in the town center and its periphery.

Göcek is situated on Dalaman–Fethiye highway. Until 2006, it was necessary to drive along a relatively narrow and winding road to reach Göcek from Dalaman. However, the 980-meter Göcek vehicle tunnel, completed in June 2006, has significantly increased the accessibility of the town. The vehicle tunnel is a toll roadway and the first example of a build-operate-transfer model.

The permanent population in Göcek is around 4,500. This number exceeds 7,000 during the summer months. Since Göcek is a departure and arrival point for Blue Cruises, there is heavy yacht traffic in the town's harbor. Göcek’s coves and 12 islands have been significant sites of tourism for the town. As well as boarding facilities, daily boat tours, entertainment facilities on the seaside, and numerous nearby beaches and coves. There are many restaurants, cafés, and bars on the promenade.

Göcek became known to groups of artists and poets and some fishermen from Bodrum as a result of their cruising along the Turkish Turquoise Coast, a journey later called the "Blue Voyage".

Of the beaches, one belongs to D-Resort Gocek which can be accessed by paying a daily price or taking out a seasonal membership. Inlice Beach is out of Göcek and can be reached by a 10-minute drive, and it is run by the municipality of Göcek. The main island beach is reachable by water taxi from the harbor. Other beaches are easily accessible by car or taxi. Amongst these is Sarıgerme, a long sandy beach. Beyond Sarıgerme is the protected beach of Iztuzu in the Dalyan Delta. In the opposite direction, the beach at Ölüdeniz is a 40-minute drive away.

The Twelve Islands can be reached by private charter boats, simple fishing boats, and larger yachts. There are about 20 sailing and motor yacht charter and brokerage sailing companies. There are several technical yacht services, chandlers, and maintenance services.

== Climate ==
In winter Göcek's average maximum temperature is 14 °C (57 °F). In the summer the average maximum is 34 °C (100 °F), and the weather is sunny for over 300 days in a year. Highs of 40 °C (104 °F) are reached at times. Because of its climate, Göcek is renowned for growing tangerines and lemons as well as oranges.

== See also ==
- Turkish Riviera
- Blue Cruise
- Marinas in Turkey
- Foreign purchases of real estate in Turkey
