= Croatian Music Channel =

Television station

- Country: Croatia; Bosnia and Herzegovina; Serbia; Montenegro
- Broadcast area: National
- Headquarters: Zagreb, Croatia

Programming
- Picture format: 1080p HDTV

Ownership
- Owner: Croatia Records

History
- Launched: 1 June 2005; 19 years ago

Links
- Website: www.cmc.com.hr

Croatian Music Channel, most commonly referred to only as CMC is a Croatian television channel broadcasting Croatian music and music of Croatian production.

It is available on cable television, IPTV, DVB-T and satellite television.

The channel's purpose is, as its founders say, to promote and present Croatian music to the World. Currently, CMC broadcasts in Europe, Asia, South America, North America and Australia.

== About CMC ==
The Croatian Music Channel started showing the program on 1 June 2005, which includes all styles of music, with an emphasis on the music of the Croatian climate.

The purpose of the program is to arouse the audience's interest in Croatian music, as well as different styles of music, from classical music, rock, pop, hit songs, children's, folklore, klapa music, tambura groups and orchestras, to contemporary techno music, such as dance, house and alternative music. The aim of the channel is not only to promote Croatian music culture and inform about events on the Croatian music scene, but also to contribute to its affirmation and create a stimulating environment for further creativity.

== The founders ==
CMC was founded and launched by the company Autor d.o.o., also the majority owner of the leading Croatian record company Croatia Records. In addition to being the record company with the longest tradition in Croatia, Croatia records also has the richest fund of all Croatian music in its phono and video library.

== Showing ==
CMC shows the program at the national level in the terrestrial network, and is also present on almost all cable and IPTV networks in Croatia, North Macedonia, Bosnia and Herzegovina, Serbia, Montenegro and Slovenia. Already in the first year of its broadcast, CMC won the award of the satellite provider Hotbird, for the best channel in the competition of new music channels, and in 2006 it won second place in the music television category, as well as the award for special contribution to the promotion of Croatian music in the world.

On 16 December 2010, CMC television received a concession from the Council for Electronic Media to broadcast terrestrial television at the national level.

== Other projects of CMC Television ==
CMC television is the founder of Jugoton TV, a music channel that shows the biggest so-called. "retro hits" from the countries of SFRJ, thanks to the largest sound library of Croatia Records. In addition to older hits, it also shows newer rock and pop songs.

CMC television is also the initiator of the revue festival of Croatian music, the CMC festival, which has enjoyed the status of one of the most important musical events of the year for seven years. It is shown live on the program of CMC Television during June every year.

In addition to the festival in Vodice, CMC also organizes the CMC 200 Slavonija fest in Slavonski Brod at the end of August. This pop and rock music festival takes place in Tvrđavi Brod.
