= Saša Kovačević (singer) =

Serbian singer

Saša Kovačević Саша Ковачевић
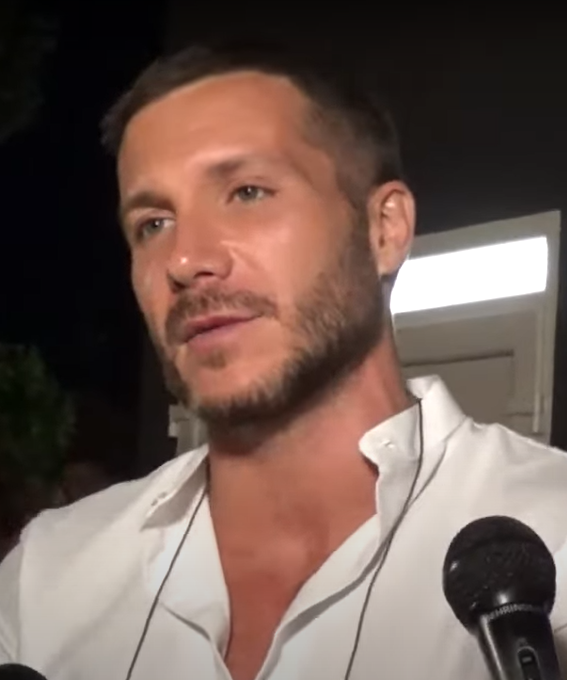
- Kovačević in 2022

Background information
- Born: Aleksandar Kovačević; 27 July 1985 (age 41); Zemun, SR Serbia, SFR Yugoslavia
- Genres: Pop; reggaeton; pop-folk
- Occupations: Singer; songwriter; producer
- Instruments: Vocals; keyboards
- Years active: 2005-present
- Labels: City Records; SK Media
- Website: sasakovacevic.rs

Kovačević sings his song "Prevarena" in the opening night of Zenica summer fest 2019

Aleksandar "Saša" Kovačević (Serbian: Александар "Саша" Ковачевић; born 27 July 1985) is a Serbian singer-songwriter. Born in Zemun, Kovačević began performing professionally as a teenager. In 2004, he rose to prominence by competing at the Sunčane Skale festival in Herceg Novi with the song "Pakao i raj". Kovačević has released two studio albums: Jedina si vredela (2006) and Ornament (2010), and held his first solo concert at the Sava Centar in Belgrade, May 2011.

Additionally, Kovačević has released numerous standalone singles, including "Lapsus" (2012), "Slučajno" (2013), "Živim da te volim" (2015), "Zamalo tvoj", "Temperatura" (2016) and "Prevarena" (2019), which have individually accumulated between over 50 and 80 million views on YouTube.

He has received various awards for his music, including the title of a "meritorious citizen" of the municipality of Zemun in November 2011.

== Discography ==
Studio albums

- Jedina si vredela (2006)
- Ornament (2010)

Compilation albums

- Platinum Collection (2011)
- 18 vanvremenskih hitova (2018)
- Zlatna kolekcija (2025)

== Awards and nominations ==
List of awards and nominations of Saša Kovačević
| Year | Award | Category | Nominee/work | Result | Ref. |
|---|---|---|---|---|---|
| 2010 | Sunčane Skale | Album of the Year | Ornament | Won | |
| 2010 | Sunčane Skale | Album Cover Art of the Year | Ornament | Won | |
| 2020 | Music Awards Ceremony | Male Pop Song of the Year | "Lažu te" | Nominated | |
| 2023 | Music Awards Ceremony | Male Pop Song of the Year | "Prevarena" | Nominated | |
