= Lepa Brena (The Best of – Dupli CD) =

Lepa Brena (The Best Of – Dupli CD)

Greatest hits album by Lepa Brena
- Released: 2003
- Recorded: 1981–2003
- Genres: Pop-folk, pop, folk
- Label: Grand Production

Lepa Brena chronology
Pomračenje sunca (2000)	Lepa Brena (The Best Of – Dupli CD) (2003)	Uđi slobodno... (2008)

Lepa Brena (The Best Of – Dupli CD) is a compilation album released by Yugoslav pop-folk singer Lepa Brena in 2003. Even though her albums date back to 1981, many of the songs on this album are remastered and several are even rerecorded, so the versions are totally different from their originals.

This is her second compilation album, the first being Lepa Brena & Slatki Greh (1990).

== Track listing ==
Disc 1
No.	Title	Original album	Length
1.	"Sanjam" (2003 version)	Hajde da se volimo, 1987
2.	"Janoš" (2003 version)	Pile moje, 1984
3.	"Perice, moja merice" (2003 version)	Pile moje
4.	"Mače moje" (2003 version)	Pile moje
5.	"Sitnije, Cile, sitnije" (2003 version)	Sitnije, Cile, sitnije, 1983
6.	"Beli se, beli, moj beli biseru" (2003 version)	Četiri godine, 1989
7.	"Bato, Bato" (2003 version)	Bato, Bato, 1984
8.	"Miki, Mićo" (2003 version)	Voli me, voli, 1986
9.	"Četiri godine"	Četiri godine
10.	"Imam pesmu da vam pevam"	Četiri godine
11.	"Jugoslovenka" (featuring Daniel Popović, Vlado Kalember and Alen Islamović)	Četiri godine
12.	"Ja pripadam samo tebi"	Četiri godine
13.	"Robinja"	Četiri godine
14.	"Poželi sreću drugima"	Četiri godine
15.	"Čik pogodi"	Boli me uvo za sve, 1990
16.	"Udri Mujo"	Hajde da se volimo
17.	"Jedan dan života" (2003 version)	Jedan dan života, 1985
18.	"Čačak" (2003 version)	Čačak, Čačak, 1982
19.	"Mile voli disko" (2003 version)	Mile voli disko, 1982
20.	"Dama iz Londona" (2003 version)	Mile voli disko
21.	"Duge noge" (2003 version)	Mile voli disko

Disc 2
No.	Title	Original album	Length
1.	"Luda za tobom"	Luda za tobom, 1996
2.	"Dva dana"	Ja nemam drugi dom, 1993
3.	"On ne voli me"	Hajde da se volimo
4.	"Lagarija, lagara"	Luda za tobom
5.	"Ja nemam drugi dom"	Ja nemam drugi dom
6.	"Ti si moj greh"	Luda za tobom
7.	"Sve mi dobro ide osim ljubavi"	Luda za tobom
8.	"Noćas mi srce pati"	Kazna Božija, 1994
9.	"I da odem iza leđa Bogu"	Ja nemam drugi dom
10.	"Pomračenje sunca"	Pomračenje sunca, 2000
11.	"Pariski lokal"	Luda za tobom
12.	"Šta je bilo, bilo je"	Luda za tobom
13.	"Okrećeš mi leđa" (2003 version)	Uske pantalone, 1986
14.	"Golube"	Hajde da se volimo
15.	"Evo zima će"	Hajde da se volimo
16.	"Ti ne znaš"	Ja nemam drugi dom
17.	"Takve i Bog čuva"	Luda za tobom
18.	"Hej, Šeki, Šeki" (2003 version)	Pile moje
19.	"Ti me podsećaš na sreću"	Pomračenje sunca
20.	"Gde si ti"	Pomračenje sunca
21.	"Hajde da se volimo"	Hajde da se volimo
