= Začarani krug tour =

2011–17 concert tour by Lepa Brena

Začarani krug Tour
- Tour by Lepa Brena
- Promotional poster for concert in Sofia at Arena Armeec, October 2015
- Associated album: Začarani krug
- Start date: 20 October 2011
- End date: 29 September 2017
- Legs: 5
- No. of shows: 15 in North America; 89 in Europe; 104 in total

Lepa Brena concert chronology
- Uđi slobodno Tour (2008–11); Začarani krug Tour (2011–17); Zar je važno da l' se peva ili pjeva... World Tour (2017–22)

The Začarani krug Tour was a tour by Bosnian singer Lepa Brena, and was staged in support of her sixteenth studio album, Začarani krug (2011). Comprising 104 shows, the tour visited Europe and North America. It began on October 20, 2011, in Belgrade, Serbia, at the Kombank Arena and concluded on September 29, 2017, in London, England at Troxy. During the tour she held the biggest concert of her career. The concert in Prilep was attended by more than 200,000 people. It was officially announced in May 2011, with dates for Balkan venues revealed. The tour was also included some festival concerts.

== Background ==
Brena performing in the Belgrade Arena, October 2011

On May 4, 2011, Brena announced a concert at the Belgrade Arena for her 51st birthday, October 20, 2011. She revealed that the concert was planned to be held at the Maracana Stadium on June 10, 2011, but because of the fear of rain, she decided for Arena. Due to great interest, she soon added another concert for October 21. At the end of September it is planned to add a third concert, but because of the exhaustion from the concert rehearsal, Brena gave up this idea. On October 24, 2011, she announced a concert in Sofia at Arena Armeec, December 3, 2011. It was her first concert in Bulgaria after 20 years, when she last sang at the Vasil Levski National Stadium in front of more than 110,000 people. At the same time, concerts in Niš, Vienna, as well as concerts for the New Year in Petrovac were announced. At the end of October, dates for North America for the spring of 2012 have been announced. It was Brena's first tour in America after almost ten years. The continuation of the European part of the tour she began in Ljubljana on May 19, where she last performed during the Uđi slobodno Tour. Concerts in Novi Bečej, Banja Luka and Berlin were canceled because Brena's activated the thrombus and she ended up at the hospital, followed by a long recovery. The tour continued in December. Začarani krug Tour returned to North America in May 2013. The concert in Novi Sad on February 14, 2014, was announced at the end of 2013. It was Brena's first concert in Novi Sad in 20 years. Due to great interest for the concert in December 2011, Brena announced another concert in Sofia at the Arena Armeec on October 22, 2015. At the end of June 2017, Brena announced a concert in London for September 29 in which she will perform after fifteen years.

=== Problems with the concert in Timișoara ===
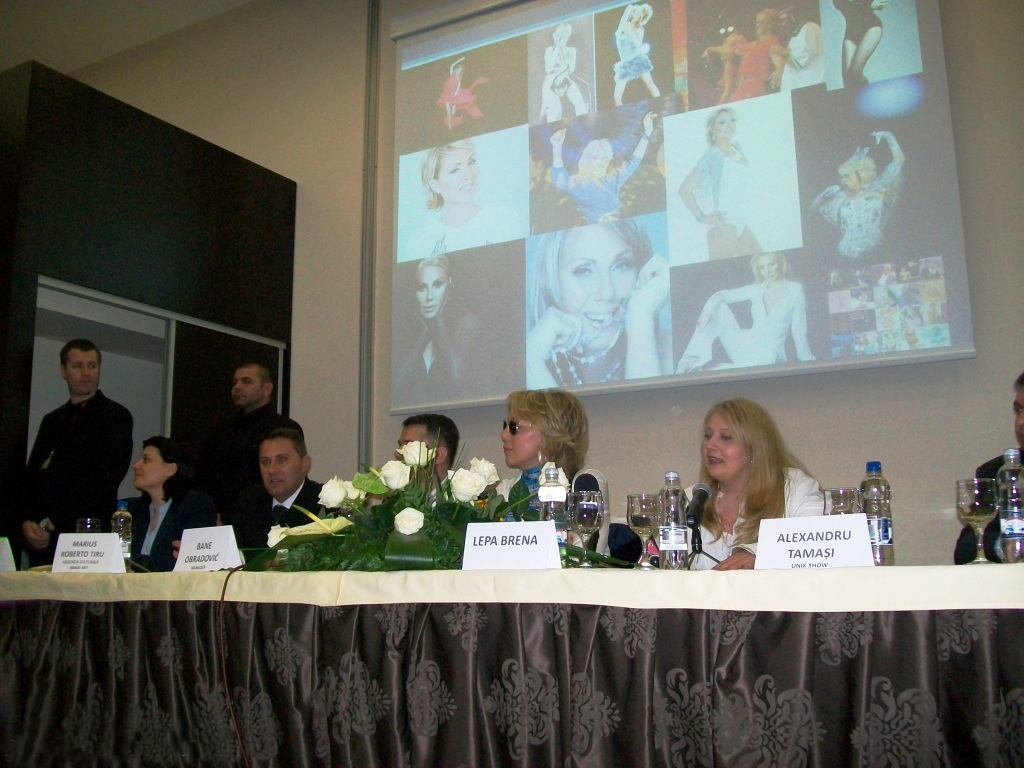
Press conference in Romania, March 2012

On March 12, 2012, Lepa Brena announced a concert in Timișoara at the Stadionul Dan Păltinișanu, on June 15, 2012, where she sang in the same place 28 years ago in front of 60,000 people. Lepa Brena was greeted with the highest honor at the border as soon as she reached the soil of Romania. Blinded cars and police security, flowers and honors that fit a world champion are just a detail that illustrates how the Romanians are seeing a star from a neighboring country. Under the special police escort, Brena came to Timișoara where she held a press conference for Romanian media related to the concert that will be held in this city on June 15, 2012. When she arrived in front of the hotel "Timișoara", Brena literally surrounded photographers and journalists from all over Romania. Since she was singing as a girl in Timișoara, for Brena this was a touching encounter with the Romans who followed her career all these years. Atmosphere at the press conference brought our singer, and at one point she sang the song "Ja nemam drugi dom"! Brena told reporters: "I must admit, when I saw flowers at the entrance to Romania, tears began because I remembered in 1984 when I was last here. I just returned all my memories." However, on June 13, 2012, was announced that the concert is scheduled for June 29, 2012 for technical reasons. The concert organizer told local media that they were forced to cancel the concert because of the rain that had fallen in the past days. "It was not possible to place an extremely demanding stage design and scenography, which will cause the Serbian folk star to appear in a delayed term, in two weeks, in front of the Romanian audience." One of the organizers of this spectacle, Aleksandar Tamaš, pointed out that 70% of tickets were sold and that the purchased tickets will be valid for the new term. On June 26, 2012, the newspaper posted that the announced Lepa Brena concert in Timișoara on June 29, 2012, was canceled. This time the reason for the postponement of the concert is not of a technical nature, but the stadium from 25 to 29 June is reserved for football matches, and because of that, it is not possible to keep the stage and hold the concert. After a few days, Lepa Brena said that she was very disappointed and would gladly schedule a new concert, but when she found a new and serious organizer for the concert.

== Set list ==
This setlist was obtained from the concert of October 20, 2011 held at Belgrade Arena in Belgrade. It does not represent all shows throughout the tour.

1. "Video Introduction" (contains elements of "Uradi to")
2. "Uradi to"
3. "Metak sa posvetom"
4. "Uđi slobodno"
5. "Bato, Bato"
6. "Grad"
7. "Biseru beli"
8. "Recite mu da ga volim"
9. "Sanjam"
10. "Robinja"
11. "Luda za tobom"
12. "Ti si moj greh"
13. "Čik pogodi"
14. "Šeik"
15. "Udri Mujo"
16. "Igraj Boro moje oro"
17. "Jugoslovenka" (ft. Daniel Popović, Vlado Kalember & Alen Islamović)
18. "Ja nemam drugi dom"
19. "Okrećeš mi leđa"
20. "Golube"
21. "Evo, zima će"
22. "Pazi kome zavidiš"
23. "Briši me" (ft. Hari Varešanović)
24. "Noćas mi srce pati"
25. "Biber" (ft. Željko Joksimović)
26. "Čačak, Čačak"
27. "Mile voli disko"
28. "Janoš"
29. "Duge noge"
30. "Sitnije, Cile, sitnije"
31. "Dama iz Londona"
32. "Miki Mićo"
33. "Hajde da se volimo"
34. "Nežna žena"
35. "Poželi sreću drugima"
36. "Mače moje"
37. "Perice, moja merice"
38. "Pariski lokal"
39. "Stakleno zvono"

== Shows ==
List of concerts, showing date, city, country, venue, tickets sold
Date	City	Country	Venue	Attendance
Europe
20 October 2011	Belgrade	Serbia	Belgrade Arena	40,000
21 October 2011	Belgrade	Serbia	Belgrade Arena	40,000
19 November 2011	Vienna	Austria	Prater Gallerien	4,500
3 December 2011	Sofia	Bulgaria	Arena Armeec	20,000
8 December 2011	Niš	Serbia	Čair Sports Center	7,000
31 December 2011	Petrovac	Montenegro	Hotel "Palas"	6,000
1 January 2012	Petrovac	Montenegro	Hotel "Palas"	6,000
24 February 2012	Munich	Germany	Club "Klangwlt"	3,000
25 February 2012	Düsseldorf	Germany	Club Ambis	3,500
2 March 2012	Salzburg	Austria	Discoteka Triebwerk West	3,000
3 March 2012	Dietikon	Switzerland	Stadthalle	5,000
31 March 2012	Bern	Switzerland	Diskoteka Palma	3,500
7 April 2012	Hamburg	Germany	Stage Club Hamburg	3,500
8 April 2012	Bielefeld	Germany	Farinda Club	3,000
27 April 2012	Nuremberg	Germany	Disco Rasha	3,000
28 April 2012	Hanover	Germany	Club Acanto	3,200
North America
4 May 2012	St. Louis	United States	Casa Loma Ballroom	3,000
5 May 2012	Chicago	United States	Banquet Hall Hanging Gardens	9,000
11 May 2012	Detroit	United States	Royalty House	3,500
12 May 2012	Toronto	Canada	Kool Haus	7,000
13 May 2012	New York City	United States	Club Pure	3,500
Europe
19 May 2012	Ljubljana	Slovenia	Arena Stožice	15,000
2 June 2012	Paris	France	Dock Eiffel	4,000
9 June 2012	Zürich	Switzerland	Club Face	3,500
12 July 2012	Sanski Most	Bosnia and Herzegovina	Discoteka Camel	4,000
15 July 2012	Prilep	Macedonia	Beerfest	200,000
1 December 2012	Düsseldorf	Germany	Ambis Club	3,500
31 December 2012	Belgrade	Serbia	Genex Impulse Hall	4,500
2 February 2013	Montlingen	Switzerland	Disco Flash	3,000
8 March 2013	Munich	Germany	VIP Club	3,500
9 March 2013	Sattledt	Austria	Club Nova	2,000
29 March 2013	Zürich	Switzerland	Club JIL	3,500
30 March 2013	Härkingen	Switzerland	Disco Atlantis	3,000
26 April 2013	Zagreb	Croatia	Club Shamballa	3,500
North America
3 May 2013	Los Angeles	United States	Roxbury Hollywood	3,000
4 May 2013	San Jose	United States	Tomba Club	2,000
8 May 2013	Las Vegas	United States	Wish Vegas	3,500
10 May 2013	Salt Lake City	United States	Royalty House	2,500
11 May 2013	Boise	United States	Idaho Ice World	3,000
17 May 2013	Clive	United States	7 Flags Event Center	3,500
18 May 2013	Jacksonville	United States	Club Aqua	3,500
24 May 2013	Lynn	United States	St. Michael's Hall	3,000
25 May 2013	Norcross	United States	Grand Ballroom	3,000
26 May 2013	Utica	United States	Daniele's Banquet	3,500
Europe
23 August 2013	Lukavac	Bosnia and Herzegovina	Arena Modrac	15,000
25 August 2013	Novi Bečej	Serbia	Velikogospojinski dani	70,000
14 September 2013	Munich	Germany	VIP Club	3,500
27 September 2013	Malmö	Sweden	Amiralen	4,000
28 September 2013	Stockholm	Sweden	Hallunda	4,500
26 October 2013	Dietikon	Switzerland	Stadthalle	5,000
30 October 2013	Bern	Switzerland	Diskoteta Palma	3,500
31 December 2013	Belgrade	Serbia	Crowne Plaza	7,000
1 January 2014	Belgrade	Serbia	Crowne Plaza	7,000
14 February 2014	Novi Sad	Serbia	SPENS	12,000
8 March 2014	Krnjak	Croatia	Stadion Krnjak	5,000
12 April 2014	Ljubljana	Slovenia	Gospodarsko razstavišče	6,000
3 June 2014	Ljubljana	Slovenia	Congress Square	50,000
18 June 2014	Domašinec	Croatia	Šampion Club	5,000
26 June 2014	Lukavac	Bosnia and Herzegovina	Arena Modrac	15,000
29 June 2014	Reșița	Romania	Town square	70,000
4 October 2014	Zürich	Switzerland	Club Face	3,500
18 October 2014	Vienna	Austria	Lugner City	5,000
6 December 2014	Lucerne	Switzerland	D'Lux The Club	3,000
27 December 2014	Črnomelj	Slovenia	Veseli December v Črnomlju	5,000
31 January 2015	Helsingborg	Sweden	Sundspärlan	3,000
13 February 2015	Travnik	Bosnia and Herzegovina	Club Tron	2,500
14 February 2015	Živinice	Bosnia and Herzegovina	Disco Pasha	2,500
21 March 2015	Munich	Germany	Heide Volm	5,000
15 May 2015	Zagreb	Croatia	The Best discothèque	3,000
6 June 2015	Wil	Switzerland	Imperia Club	3,000
31 July 2015	Makarska	Croatia	Petar Pan Club	4,000
28 August 2015	Makedonska Kamenica	Macedonia	Town square	25,000
30 August 2015	Novi Bečej	Serbia	Velikogospojinski dani	80,000
10 October 2015	Ljubljana	Slovenia	Gospodarsko razstavišče	6,000
22 October 2015	Sofia	Bulgaria	Arena Armeec	20,000
14 November 2015	Vienna	Austria	Admiral Dome	5,000
18 December 2015	Zenica	Bosnia and Herzegovina	Arena Zenica	10,000
31 December 2015	Belgrade	Serbia	Square in front of the National Assembly of Serbia	60,000
13 February 2016	Stockholm	Sweden	Balkan Beat Cruise	5,000
14 February 2016	Stockholm	Sweden	Balkan Beat Cruise	5,000
5 March 2016	Pforzheim	Germany	Flash Club	3,000
2 April 2016	Berlin	Germany	Universal Hall	5,000
9 April 2016	Zürich	Switzerland	Club Face	3,000
14 May 2016	Groesbeek	Netherlands	Sporthal Heuvelland	3,000
20 May 2016	Brussels	Belgium	Théâtre Saint-Michel	2,500
28 May 2016	Oslo	Norway	Samfunnssalen	3,000
25 June 2016	Celje	Slovenia	Carraro Fest	10,000
30 July 2016	Mostar	Bosnia and Herzegovina	Aqua Park Havana	5,000
27 August 2016	Wil	Switzerland	Imperia Club	3,000
4 November 2016	Poreč	Croatia	Palazzo Club	3,000
5 November 2016	Linz	Austria	Club Liberty	3,500
3 December 2016	Stuttgart	Germany	Club Metropola	3,500
23 December 2016	Gothenburg	Sweden	Trädgårn	4,000
24 December 2016	Dortmund	Germany	Club Prisma	3,000
31 December 2016	Čačak	Serbia	Gradski Trg	10,000
11 February 2017	Munich	Germany	Postpalast	4,000
8 April 2017	Plovdiv	Bulgaria	Kolodruma Arena	5,000
26 May 2017	Rosenheim	Germany	LOFT Club	2,000
27 May 2017	Dietikon	Switzerland	Stadthalle	3,000
8 July 2017	Knjaževac	Serbia	Gurgusovačka kula	6,000
29 July 2017	Ohrid	Macedonia	Plaža Gradište	3,000
11 August 2017	Orašje	Bosnia and Herzegovina	Sova Night Club	4,000
16 September 2017	Štip	Macedonia	Town square	50,000
29 September 2017	London	England	Troxy	4,000
Total				1,082,700

== Cancelled shows ==
List of cancelled concerts, showing date, city, country, venue and reason for cancellation
Date	City	Country	Venue	Reason
15 June 2012	Timișoara	Romania	Stadionul Dan Păltinișanu	Logistics difficulty
25 August 2012	Banja Luka	Bosnia and Herzegovina	Aquana	Recovering from illness
26 August 2012	Novi Bečej	Serbia	Velikogospjinski dani	Recovering from illness
1 September 2012	Berlin	Germany	Universal hall	Recovering from illness
25 July 2014	Makarska	Croatia	Petar Pan Club	Broke her arm
26 July 2014	Makarska	Croatia	Petar Pan Club	Broke her arm
30 July 2014	Cazin	Bosnia and Herzegovina	Hotel "Sedra"	Broke her arm
20 September 2014	Vienna	Austria	Lugner City	Broke her arm
2 January 2015	Travnik	Bosnia and Herzegovina	Club Tron	Broke her wrist
3 January 2015	Živinice	Bosnia and Herzegovina	Disco Pasha	Broke her wrist
20 June 2015	Skopje	Macedonia	Philip II Arena	Due to the unstable political situation and terrorist attacks in the country
