= Lepa Brena (HITOVI – 6 CD-a) =

Box set by Lepa Brena
- Released: 29 February 2016
- Recorded: 2000–2013
- Genres: Folk; pop; dance; sevdalinka
- Label: Grand Production

Lepa Brena chronology
Izvorne i novokomponovane narodne pesme (2013)	Lepa Brena (HITOVI – 6 CD-a) (2016)	Zar je važno dal se peva ili pjeva (2018)

Lepa Brena (HITOVI – 6 CD-a) (English: Lepa Brena (HITS – 6 CDs)) is a box set by Yugoslav singer Lepa Brena. It was released by Grand Production on 29 February 2016. The six-disc box set was released in Europe, and included all of Pomračenje sunca (2000), Lepa Brena (The Best of – Dupli CD) (2003), Uđi slobodno... (2008), Začarani krug (2011) and Izvorne i novokomponovane narodne pesme (2013). The album artwork consisted of a collage of the album covers. This is her third compilation album.
