= Uđi slobodno Tour =

2008–11 concert tour by Lepa Brena

- Tour by Lepa Brena
- Promotional poster for concert in Munich at Tonhalle, February 2010
- Associated album: Uđi slobodno...
- Start date: 1 November 2008
- End date: 28 May 2011
- Legs: 3
- No. of shows: 3 in Australia; 44 in Europe; 47 in total

Lepa Brena concert chronology
- Great Yugoslav Tour '84 (1984); Uđi slobodno Tour (2008–11); Začarani krug Tour (2011–17)

The Uđi slobodno Tour was a tour by Yugoslav singer Lepa Brena, and was staged in support of her fifteenth studio album, Uđi slobodno... (2008). Comprising 47 shows, the tour visited Europe and Australia. It began on 1 November 2008, in Zürich, Switzerland, at the Club Grodoonia and concluded on 28 May 2011, in Düsseldorf, Germany at Club Ambis. This was Brena's returnee tour. For the first time in 20 years she performed in Zagreb, Sarajevo, Banja Luka, Ljubljana and Mostar. It was officially announced in April 2008, with dates for Balkan venues revealed.

== Background ==
Brena's previous album Pomračenje sunca (2000) has not experienced much success. In order to regain her status as a star in the former Yugoslavia, Brena collected a team of experts for the new album. She chose Marina Tucaković for writing lyrics for new songs, and for music and production Aleksandar Milić Mili, who was known for his previous collaboration with Ceca. With the new album, a large returnee tour was planned in all major cities of the former Yugoslavia. Brena also hired a team of stylists who will create a new image for her, and a team that will develop her stage performance.

== Protests against concerts ==
In the turbulent years of the late 1980s and early 1990s, ethnic tensions started rising in Yugoslavia and eventually led to the dissolution of Yugoslavia. Brena was one of the main tabloid targets at the time, as she was a Bosnian Muslim who sang and spoke in the Serbian Ekavian dialect and married a Serb man. Several tabloids claimed she had converted from Islam to Serbian Orthodoxy and had changed her name from Fahreta to Jelena. She denied those claims intensely and has never publicly spoken about her religious beliefs although she was raised a Sunni Muslim.

In 2009, Bosniaks and Croats protested her concerts in Sarajevo on 30 May and in Zagreb on 13 June. The reason behind the protests were pictures allegedly shot in 1993 during the Bosnian War wearing the uniform of the Army of Republika Srpska in her besieged hometown Brčko. Croatian and Bosnian protesters were angered that she was performing in their newly established independent countries and called her a "traitor" and a "četnikuša". The concerts went ahead as scheduled with no incident and she claimed the uniform was from the set of a 1990 music video for her song "Tamba lamba", in which she wore a similar uniform while filming at a zoo in Kenya for the movie, Hajde da se volimo 3. Brena also claimed she was only in Brčko in 1993 to rescue her parents.

== Shows ==
List of concerts, showing date, city, country, venue, tickets sold
Date	City	Country	Venue	Attendance
Europe
1 November 2008	Zürich	Switzerland	Club Grodoonia	3,000
15 November 2008	Vienna	Austria	Club Nachtwerk	3,500
20 December 2008	Stuttgart	Germany	Carl Benz Arena	5,500
25 December 2008	Bochum	Germany	Taksim Club	2,700
31 December 2008	Budva	Montenegro	Town square	20,000
17 January 2009	Bansko	Bulgaria	Club Nai	3,000
7 February 2009	Frankfurt	Germany	Union Hall	4,000
7 March 2009	Duisburg	Germany	Club Intakt	3,000
14 March 2009	Zürich	Switzerland	Club Grodoonia	3,000
21 March 2009	Ljubljana	Slovenia	Tivoli Hall	10,000
4 April 2009	Kotor	Montenegro	Club Maximus	3,000
24 April 2009	Malmö	Sweden	Amiralen	3,500
25 April 2009	Stockholm	Sweden	Gamla Tryckeriet	3,000
30 May 2009	Sarajevo	Bosnia and Herzegovina	Olympic Hall Zetra	15,000
11 June 2009	Mostar	Bosnia and Herzegovina	Stadion pod Bijelim Brijegom	15,000
13 June 2009	Zagreb	Croatia	Arena Zagreb	16,500
8 July 2009	Banja Luka	Bosnia and Herzegovina	Gradski stadion	20,000
5 September 2009	Portorož	Slovenia	Amfiteter Auditorija	3,600
7 November 2009	Vienna	Austria	Club Nachtwerk	3,000
Australia
28 November 2009	Sydney	Australia	Withlam Centre	5,000
4 December 2009	Perth	Australia	Herb Graham	3,000
5 December 2009	Melbourne	Australia	Springvale Hall	6,000
Europe
9 February 2010	Ptuj	Slovenia	Karnevalska Dvorana	5,000
27 February 2010	Munich	Germany	Tonhalle	4,000
3 April 2010	Düsseldorf	Germany	Club Ambis	3,000
1 May 2010	Pforzheim	Germany	Flash Club Lounge	2,000
8 May 2010	Montlingen	Switzerland	Club Flash	3,000
18 May 2010	Tinjan	Croatia	Gradski stadion	5,000
10 September 2010	Mostar	Bosnia and Herzegovina	Club Bidge	3,000
24 September 2010	Malmö	Sweden	Slagthus	4,000
25 September 2010	Norrköping	Sweden	Folkets Park Borgen	3,000
1 October 2010	Horsens	Denmark	Torsted Hallen	3,500
2 October 2010	Gothenburg	Sweden	Hogsbohallen	5,000
10 December 2010	Nuremberg	Germany	Club Bodrum	3,000
11 December 2010	Berlin	Germany	Universal Hall	5,000
18 December 2010	Riazzino	Switzerland	Club Boomerang	2,000
25 December 2010	Hamburg	Germany	Club Balkannight	3,000
29 January 2011	Littau	Switzerland	Club Perosa	3,000
5 February 2011	Munich	Germany	Inclub Munich	3,500
5 March 2011	Rijeka	Croatia	Dvorana Mladosti	5,000
8 April 2011	Salzburg	Austria	Diskoteka Triebwerk West	3,000
9 April 2011	Frankfurt	Austria	Union Halle	4,000
16 April 2011	Skoplje	Macedonia	Boris Trajkovski Sports Center	12,000
30 April 2011	Härkingen	Switzerland	Diskoteka Atlantis	3,000
7 May 2011	Pforzheim	Germany	Flash Club Lounge	2,500
27 May 2011	Baar	Switzerland	Club Diamonds	3,000
28 May 2011	Düsseldorf	Germany	Club Ambis	3,500
Total				250,300
