= Fayo =

Canadian singer (1977–2024)

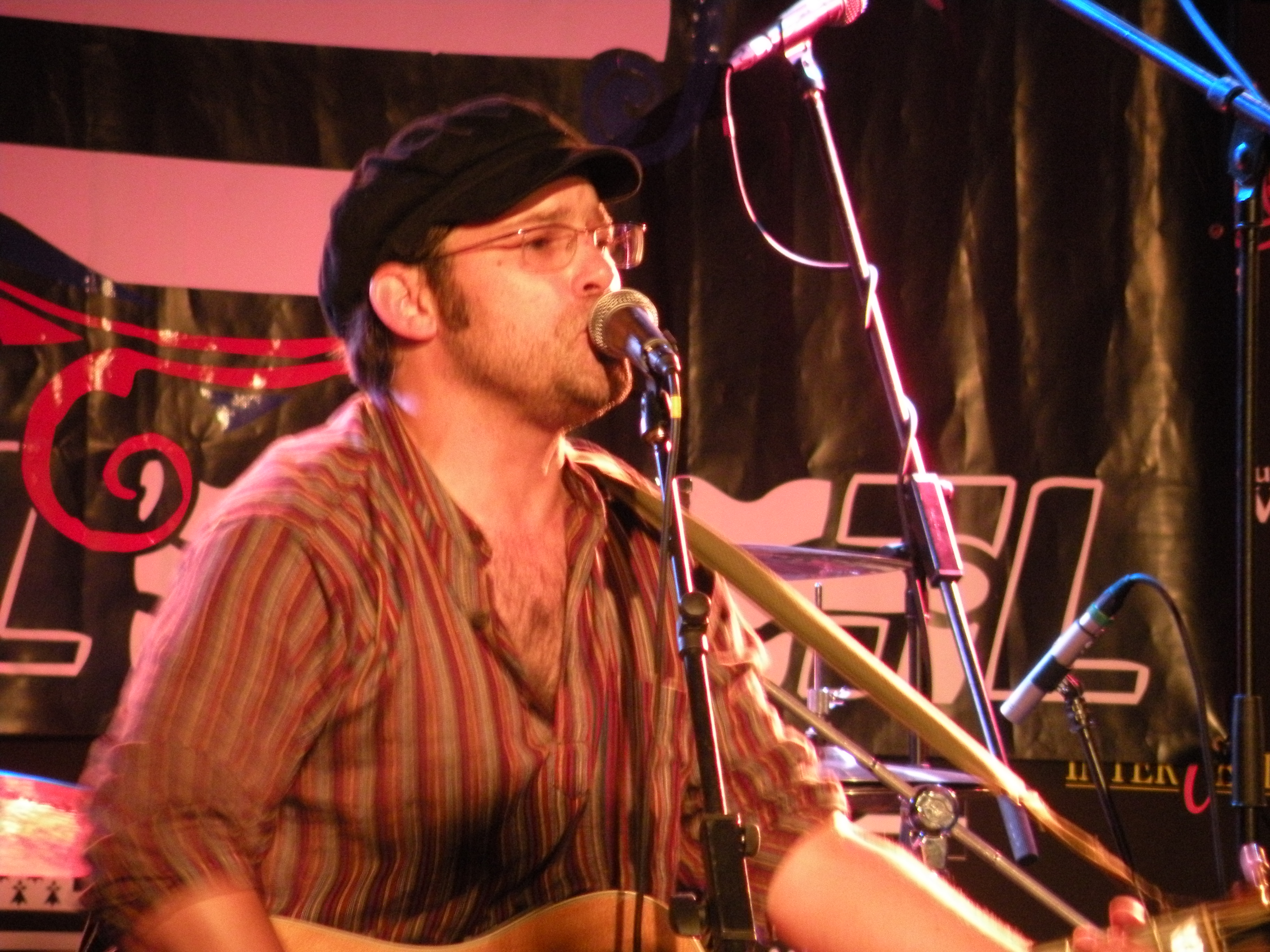
- Fayo in concert at the Interceltic Festival of Lorient in 2010

Background information
- Also known as: Fayo
- Born: Mario LeBlanc; October 18, 1977; Dieppe, New Brunswick, Canada
- Origin: Dieppe, New Brunswick, Canada
- Died: September 30, 2024 (aged 46) Mont-Carmel, Prince Edward Island, Canada
- Genres: Folk; rock
- Instrument: Guitar
- Website: Fayo.ca

Mario LeBlanc (October 18, 1977 – September 30, 2024), better known under stage name Fayo (transl. bean), was an Acadian musician born in Dieppe, New Brunswick. As many artists from southeastern New Brunswick, Fayo sang in chiac, the local French dialect mixing French words with English grammar, and vice versa. His music is a blend of folk, rock and urban poetry.

== Life and career ==
Fayo started writing songs at the age of thirteen. He then sang for the Acadian band Réveil until 1996. In 1999, he wrote an Acadian poetry book entitled Taches de naissance (transl. Birthmarks).

Soon after, he would start his solo career. In 2000, he won the singer-songwriter of the year award at the Gala de la Chanson de Caraquet (fr) for his album La fiève des fèves (transl. Bean Fever). He then went on tour with two of his friends, Rémi Arsenault (contrabass) and Steven LeBlanc (guitar). Also in 2000, he won the Prix Éloizes (fr) as "Newcomer of the Year" (Découverte de l'Année).

In 2006, Fayo would record his second album Accent Aigu (transl. Acute Accent).

Fayo worked with Bosnian singer Lepa Brena on her 2011 album, Začarani krug. He composed the music for the song "Briši me" with Hajrudin Hari Varešanović.

Fayo died after a brief cancer in Mont-Carmel, Prince Edward Island on September 30, 2024, at the age of 46.

== Discography ==
La fiève des fèves (2001)
| No. | Title | Length |
|---|---|---|
| 1. | "Chico Harico" | 3:52 |
| 2. | "Le chat mangera pas ma langue" | 4:31 |
| 3. | "Attendre en vain" | 5:29 |
| 4. | "Le mythe du masque à Ray" | 5:48 |
| 5. | "Identité" | 5:36 |
| 6. | "Le téléphone sonne" | 4:06 |
| 7. | "Stove pipe city" | 2:47 |
| 8. | "Sa mess" | 5:26 |
| 9. | "La toune de blues" | 3:28 |
| 10. | "Tramble bam" | 4:46 |
| 11. | "La ballade d'une firefighter" | 5:03 |
| 12. | "Le culte des cosses" | 3:27 |
| 13. | "Matou" | 2:51 |
| 14. | "Saoul pi stoned" | 3:28 |

Accent aigu (2006)
| No. | Title | Length |
|---|---|---|
| 1. | "J'ai back mové" | 3:16 |
| 2. | "J'ai oublié ton nom" | 3:53 |
| 3. | "Dans la ville" | 3:56 |
| 4. | "Le lac a débordé" | 4:02 |
| 5. | "Une bombe qui tombe" | 3:03 |
| 6. | "Marie-Mai" | 3:57 |
| 7. | "Jean sans abri" | 4:03 |
| 8. | "J'aime ça quand tu me love" | 4:13 |
| 9. | "Les gambling blues" | 3:09 |
| 10. | "La Mariecomo" | 4:12 |
| 11. | "Mon été" | 3:07 |
| 12. | "La toune à Guy" | 5:20 |

Fayo (2012)
| No. | Title | Length |
|---|---|---|
| 1. | "Bonne journée" | 3:03 |
| 2. | "Ej crache croche" | 2:44 |
| 3. | "Alonzy-alonzo" | 3:51 |
| 4. | "Moonshine" | 2:44 |
| 5. | "Dans mon jardin" | 2:44 |
| 6. | "Gueule de bois" | 3:58 |
| 7. | "Galerie" | 3:09 |
| 8. | "Soleil" | 3:03 |
| 9. | "Champs de blé d'inde" | 3:40 |
| 10. | "Les souris" | 3:11 |
| 11. | "Lilas" | 2:43 |
| 12. | "Le destin du dessin" | 3:04 |

== Poetry ==
- Mario LeBlanc (1999). Taches de naissance. Éditions Perce-Neige. ISBN 2-920221-75-2.
