= Hajde da se volimo =

Hajde da se volimo may refer to:

- Hajde da se volimo (album)
- Hajde da se volimo (film series)
- Hajde da se volimo (Kerber song)
