= Lepa Brena: Godine Slatkog greha =

2017 documentary film

- Directed by: Haris Dubica
- Produced by: Vision Team; Haris Dubica; Lepa Brena
- Starring: Lepa Brena
- Edited by: Aref Zaabi
- Production company: Vision Team Studio
- Distributed by: Prva Srpska Televizija
- Release dates: December 28, 2017 (Grand Production Studio); January 9, 2018 (Serbia)
- Running time: 114 minutes
- Country: Serbia
- Language: Serbian
- Budget: $10,000 (estimated)

Lepa Brena: Godine Slatkog greha is a 2017 documentary film about Yugoslav singer Lepa Brena. The film documents the events since the beginning of Brena's career in 1982 until the breakup of Yugoslavia in 1991.

== Synopsis ==
In the codumentary, Lepa Brena Discusses both well-known aspects and previously unrevealed details of her life. The film covers her childhood in Brčko, her upbringing in a working-class family, and her career in the former Yugoslavia. It details the growth of her brand, the role of her manager Raka Đokić, in the success of Lepa Brena and Slatki greh and how their nine year concert tour. The film features commentary from notable contemporary artists and public figures. It begins with an anecdote from her elementary school years, in which a stranger predicted she would become as famous as Tito. The documentary presents her life story alongside an exploration of the sociological, cultural and economic conditions of the era. Brena stated that the film reflects her schedule between 1982 and 1991 with Slatki Greh, during which she performed twice daily, starred in four films, and maintained a continuous touring schedule. During the 1980s, Lepa Brena and Slatki Greh become one of the highest-selling acts in Yugoslav music history, with album sales reaching up to one million copies per release. They also set a record at the Dom Sindikata venue by performing 31 consecutive concerts during a single residency.

== Cast ==
- Lepa Brena
- Slobodan Živojinović, husband
- Stefan Živojinović, son
- Filip Živojinović, son
- Viktor Živojinović, son
- Ljubiša Marković Frenki, musician (member of the "Slatki greh")
- Živojin Matić Žile, musician (member of the "Slatki greh")
- Branislav Mijatović Mija, musician (member of the "Slatki greh")
- Saša Popović, musician (member of the "Slatki greh")
- Zoran Radanov Zoki, musician (member of the "Slatki greh")
- Marina Tucaković, songwriter
- Dragan Bjelogrlić, actor
- Mirjana Bobić Mojsilović, actress and writer
- Svetlana Ceca Ražnatović, singer
- Tereza Kesovija, singer
- Vlado Kalember, singer
- Alen Islamović, singer
- Milutin Popović Zahar, composer
- Stanko Crnobrnja, television and film director, producer and screenwriter
- Emir Hadžihafizbegović, actor
- Marko Janković, journalist, radio and television host
- Ivana Žigon, actress
- Eva Ras, actress
- Danica Maksimović, actress
- Mima Karadžić, actor
