= Bato, Bato =

Studio album by Lepa Brena
- Released: 5 January 1984
- Genre: Pop folk
- Length: 34:46
- Label: PGP-RTB
- Producer: Kornelije Kovač (tracks 1 and 9); Mića Đorđević (tracks 2–8 and 10–13)

Lepa Brena chronology
Sitnije, Cile, sitnije (1983)	Bato, Bato (1984)	Pile moje (1984)

Bato, Bato is the third studio album by Yugoslav pop-folk singer Lepa Brena and her band Slatki Greh. It was released 5 January 1984 through the record label PGP-RTB and with over a million copies sold it is the best-selling album in Yugoslavia and made Lepa Brena a superstar outside of her home-country, especially in Bulgaria and Romania.

This was her fourth of twelve albums with Slatki Greh.

== Background ==
This album marked the end of Brena's cooperation with her former manager (Milutin Popović Zachar) and saw her usher in a new level of popularity with Zachar's replacement Raka Đokić. For the new record's promotion, Brena found herself acting again next to Nikola Simić in the film Nema problema. The film and the new album Bato, Bato were highly successful. The film won the "Oscars of Popularity" that year. The album sold 1,100,000 copies and thus became the best-selling album in Yugoslavia's history. At the signing of the album in Belgrade, over 5,000 people came, which caused massive crowding and traffic jams. Thanks to this album, Brena became one of the most popular singers in Yugoslavia, becoming a mega star in Romania and Bulgaria. In Timișoara, Romania, on August 10, 1985, 65,000 people attended their concert at the Stadionul Dan Păltinișanu.

== Title ==
The album name comes from a male nickname, Bato, very common in former Yugoslavia. Although there is also an English version of this name (also Bato), which means 'son of the farmer'. It is a form of the name Bartholomew.

== Track listing ==
No.	Title	Writer(s)	Producer(s)	Length
1.	"Bato, Bato"	Slavica Vuković; Predrag Vuković	Kornelije Kovač	2:09
2.	"Bosanac" (Bosnian man)	Miša Marković	Mića Đorđević	3:15
3.	"Šta ti je" (What's Wrong with You)	Ruždija Krupa; Predrag Negovanović	Mića Đorđević	3:03
4.	"Čik priđi ako smeš" (Come Closer If You Dare)	Miša Marković	Mića Đorđević	2:35
5.	"Brani me, brani" (Protect Me)	Ruždija Krupa; Predrag Negovanović	Mića Đorđević	2:35
6.	"Volim te sve luđe" (I Love You More and More)	Srđan Jovanović; Miša Mijatović	Mića Đorđević	2:45
7.	"Nemoj reći da me voliš" (Don't Say You Love Me)	Srđan Jovanović	Mića Đorđević	2:16
8.	"Moj je lola zvezda roken rola" (My Baby Is a Rock Star)	Dejan Pataković	Mića Đorđević	3:30
9.	"Boc, boc..." (Poke, Poke)	S. Stojanović; Kornelije Kovač	Kornelije Kovač	2:28
10.	"Igraj Boro, moje oro" (Boro, Dance My Oro)	Radmila Todorović	Mića Đorđević	2:49
11.	"Epidemija ljubavi" (Epidemic of Love)	Tomislavka Todorović	Mića Đorđević	3:14
12.	"Recite mu da ga volim" (Tell Him I Love Him)	Miša Marković	Mića Đorđević	3:19
13.	"Dečko mi je školarac" (My Boyfriend Is a Student)	Tomislavka Todorović	Mića Đorđević	2:48

== Release history ==
List of regions, release dates, showing formats, label and reference
Region	Date	Format(s)	Label	Ref.
SFR Yugoslavia	January 5, 1984	vinyl; Cassette	PGP-RTB	
