= Lepa Brena =

Yugoslav singer (born 1960)

- Лепа Брена
- Brena in 2011
- Born: Fahreta Jahić; 20 October 1960 (age 66); Tuzla, SR Bosnia and Herzegovina, SFR Yugoslavia
- Other name: Fahreta Živojinović
- Occupations: Singer; actress; talent manager; businesswoman; director
- Years active: 1980–present
- Height: 1.80 m (5 ft 11 in)
- Spouse: Slobodan Živojinović (m. 1991)
- Children: 2
- Relatives: Aleksandra Prijović (stepdaughter-in-law)
- Musical career
- Genres: Pop folk; turbo-folk
- Instrument: vocals
- Labels: PGP-RTB; Diskoton; Grand Production
- Formerly of: Slatki Greh

Fahreta Živojinović (née Jahić; Serbo-Croatian Cyrillic: Фахрета Живојиновић, née Јахић; born 20 October 1960), known by her stage name Lepa Brena (Serbo-Croatian Cyrillic: Лепа Брена), is a Yugoslav singer, actress, and businesswoman. With around 40 million sold records, she is regarded as the most commercially successful recording artist from the former Yugoslavia. Brena is also often credited with creating the turbo-folk genre with her first two albums Čačak, Čačak (1982) and Mile voli disko (1982).

Lepa Brena grew up in Brčko, Bosnia and Herzegovina, but has lived in Belgrade, Serbia since 1980, where she started her career. Lepa Brena is considered to be a symbol of the former Yugoslavia, due to the fact that she was one of the last popular acts to emerge before the breakup of the country. She has described herself as being "Yugo-nostalgic". Along with her husband, Slobodan Živojinović and friend, Saša Popović, Brena co-founded and co-owned Grand Production, the biggest record label and production company in the Balkans. In 2019, they decided to sell Grand Production for €30 million.

== Early life ==
Born into a Bosniak family in the outskirts of Tuzla, PR Bosnia and Herzegovina, she grew up in Brčko as the youngest child of Abid Jahić (c. 1928 – 22 October 2010) and Ifeta (née Smajlović; 15 April 1934 – 21 November 2014) alongside her sister Faketa and brother Faruk. Both of her parents are originally from villages near Srebrenik; her father was born in Ježinac and her maternal family hailed from Ćehaje. At the start of the Bosnian War in 1992, her sister Faketa emigrated to Canada, where she lives today, while Brena stayed in Belgrade where she had been living since 1980.

Her first performance for an audience was in the fifth grade at a local festival, singing a Kemal Monteno song named "Sviraj mi o njoj". She later reflected, "It was the only time in my life that I've ever experienced stage fright." Afterwards, she started performing regularly at dance parties in Brčko.

While a guest on a Croatian television show in March 2014, she was asked if she had been ashamed of having a Muslim background, to which she replied: "Why would I be ashamed? I was and stay what I am. Today I am Fahreta. I am proud of my parents and roots". She said of her stage name, that Brena was given to her by her basketball coach Vlado, while the epithet Lepa (lit. 'beautiful' or 'pretty') was given to her by showman Minimaks.

== Career ==
=== 1980–1983: Slatki Greh and career beginnings ===
In early 1980, at the age of 19, Fahreta began singing with a band called Lira Show when the group's original singer Spasa left the band because her husband, a boxer, did not want his wife to be a singer. Saša Popović, the band's frontman, was initially opposed to the idea that Fahreta should be the band's new singer, but later changed his opinion. She subsequently moved to Novi Sad and then to Belgrade. Brena's first performance with Lira Show occurred on 6 April 1980 in the hotel Turist in Bačka Palanka. Lira Show changed their name to Slatki Greh (Sweet Sin) in 1981. Brena and Slatki Greh premiered their first studio album, Čačak, Čačak, on 3 February 1982. The album was written mostly by Milutin Popović-Zahar, and the career-manager was Vladimir Cvetković.

Since her career began in 1980, she has become arguably the most popular singer of the former Yugoslavia, and a top-selling female recording artist with more than 40 million records sold. The same year Lepa Brena and Slatki Greh appeared in the first part of Yugoslav classic comedy film A Tight Spot with popular comedian Nikola Simić and actress Ružica Sokić, which raised their status and brought them almost instant fame. They would again team up with songwriter Milutin Popović-Zahar for their second studio album Mile voli disko (Mile Loves Disco), released 18 November 1982. In addition to the title song, the album had a couple of other hit songs: "Duge noge" ("Long Legs") and "Dama iz Londona" ("London Lady"). The album sold in 800,000 copies, becoming one of the best-selling albums in Yugoslavia.

In 1983, Lepa Brena and Slatki Greh ended their collaboration with Milutin Popović-Zahar and Vladimir Cvetković. That same year Lepa Brena and Slatki Greh participated in Jugovizija, the Yugoslav selection for the Eurovision Song Contest, with the song "Sitnije, Cile, sitnije". The song was released on an extended play of the same name, along with another song. Their appearance on Jugovizija caused controversy, since the competition was traditionally dominated exclusively by pop artists, and Lepa Brena belonged to a drastically different music genre, which was folk-pop, or also called novokomponovana muzika. Although they did not qualify for the prestigious European competition, Lepa Brena and Slatki Greh gained even more popularity.

=== 1984–1990: Bato, Bato and Hajde da se volimo ===
1984 saw Brena and her band begin a cooperation with a new manager and producer, Raka Đokić. Bato, Bato (Brother, Brother), their third album, was released the same year. A new provocative image was accompanied by a new musical style, different from the one fostered by Popović. The album sold 1.1 million copies, becoming one of the best-selling albums in Yugoslavia. Later that year, they held a concert in neighboring Romania, at the stadium in Timișoara to an audience of 65,000, what was at time among the most successful concerts of a Yugoslav musician outside their home country.

Lepa Brena established a cooperation with Serbian folk star Miroslav Ilić and recorded a collaborative extended play Jedan dan života (One Day of Life, 1985), which featured four songs, including a romantic duet called "Jedan dan života", and the song "Živela Jugoslavija" (Long Live Yugoslavia), which was received with a mixed response. The latter song was in line with Brena's only official political stance: an uncompromising support of a united Yugoslavia, with her becoming a symbol of this view.

Their next three albums—Pile moje (My Little One, 1984), Voli me, voli (Love Me, Love, 1986) and Uske pantalone (Tight Trousers, 1986)—would propel her to the throne of the Yugoslav music scene. By the end of 1986, Lepa Brena had become the star of Belgrade social jet-set, and the most popular public figure in Yugoslavia.

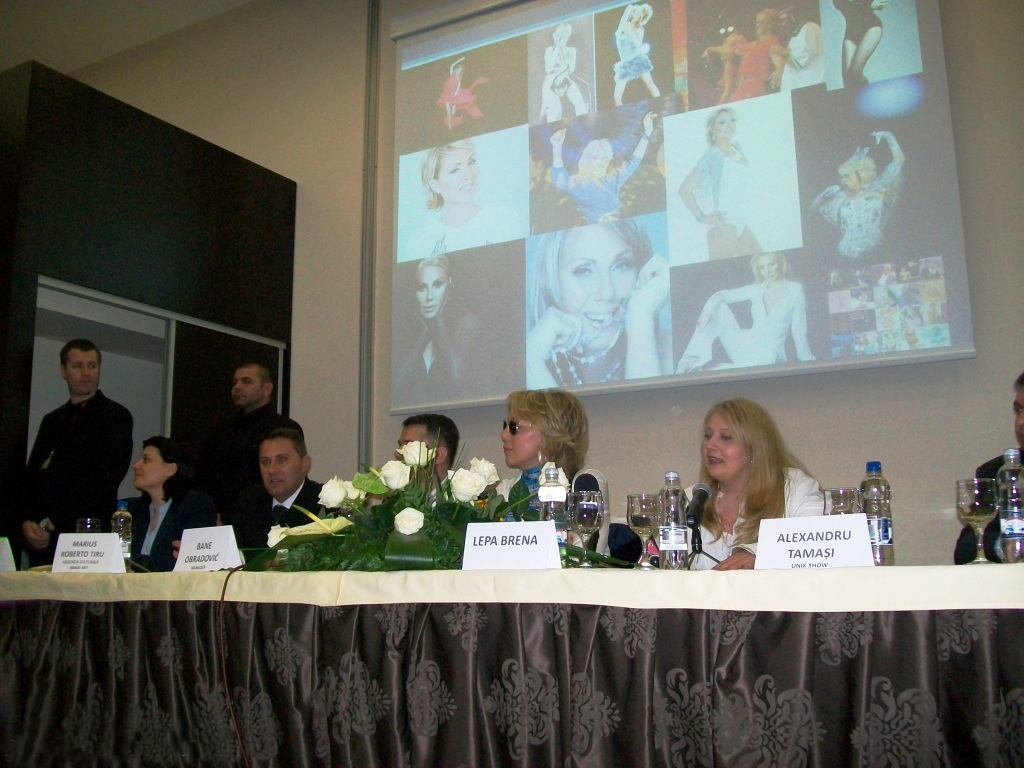
Brena on press conference for her upcoming concert in Timișoara, România

Brena's manager Raka Đokić came up with the idea that her seventh studio album should be followed by a film in which she would play the lead role. This idea was successfully implemented in 1987 when the motion picture Hajde da se volimo (Let's Love Each Other) was filmed. The film shared the name with the album. Many then-popular Yugoslav actors co-starred in the film, including Dragomir "Gidra" Bojanić, Milutin "Mima" Karadžić, Velimir "Bata" Živojinović, Milan Štrljić, etc. Based on the success of the original, Hajde da se volimo: Još jednom (Let's Love Each Other: Again) got produced and premiered in 1989. On the premiere of the film, Brena met her now husband, Slobodan Živojinović.

The movie was followed by her eight studio album Četiri godine (Four Years). It was released on 1 October 1989 by Diskoton, and contained the hits "Jugoslovenka" (Yugoslav Woman) (with Montenegrin vocalist Danijel Popović, Croatian vocalist Vlado Kalember and Bosnian vocalist Alen Islamović), "Imam pesmu da vam pevam" (I Have a Song to Sing to You), "Jablane" (Poplar Tree), "Igraj dragi" (Dance Dear), both written by Bosnian singer Dino Merlin. The music video for the pop song "Čuvala me mama" (Mum Protected Me) was filmed on the Croatian island Lopud. Music video for her song "Robinja" (lit. 'Slave') was filmed at Hagia Sophia in Istanbul. The scenes of Brena walking through Istanbul, as well as those filmed in front of Hagia Sophia, for which special permits were obtained, together with the scale of the production and the award that year, contributed to her international recognition and positioned her among notable artists beyond the region. The project marked one of the first occasions on which Brena was presented to audiences with minimal makeup, wearing a costume and a hat designed by Thierry Mugler. The album sold 600,000 units.

After even more success, Hajde da se volimo: Udaje se Lepa Brena (Let's Love Each Other: Lepa Brena Is Getting Married) got released, making it a trilogy. It was followed by the studio album Boli me uvo za sve (I Don't Care About Anything). Boli me uvo za sve also had multiple hit songs including "Čik pogodi" (Take a Guess), "Biće belaja" (There Will Be Trouble), "Tamba lamba", and the title track. Lepa Brena and Slatki Greh held more than 350 concerts yearly, and would often hold two concerts in one day. They set a record by holding thirty-one concerts consecutively at Dom Sindikata, and seventeen concerts consecutively at the Sava Centar.

Brena's most memorable performance happened on 24 July 1990, in Sofia, Bulgaria, when she landed with a Mil Mi-8 helicopter at Vasil Levski National Stadium, and held a concert with an audience of 122,000 people, making it one of the most attended concerts in the world, at the time. Helicopter she descended on the stage with belonged to Bulgarian leader Todor Zhivkov, which soon became one of the most famous concert entrances in Balkan music history. While she was in Bulgaria in July 1990, she met with the Bulgarian mystic Baba Vanga.

=== 1991–1999: Ja nemam drugi dom and Grand Production ===
Brena and Slatki Greh released their second-to-last album together, Zaljubiška (ct. Lovelysh), in 1991.

In December 1993, after two-year hiatus, Brena premiered her first solo album Ja nemam drugi dom (I Have No Other Home), and held a famous "concert in the rain" on 13 June 1994 at Belgrade's Tašmajdan Sports Centre which was attended by 35,000 people. After that, she recorded two more solo albums: Kazna Božija (God's Punishment), 1994 and Luda za tobom (Crazy Over You), 1996. In the mid-90s she had many popular songs; "Kazna Božija" (God's punishment), "Luda za tobom" (Crazy for You), "Sve mi dobro ide osim ljubavi" (I'm Good at Everything But Love), "Izdajice" (Traitors), "Moj se dragi Englez pravi" (My Man's Acting an Englishman), "I da odem iza leđa bogu" (Even If I Go Behind God's Back), "Ja nemam drugi dom" (I don't have other home), "Dva dana" (Two Days), "Ti si moj greh" (You Are My Sin), among others.

The music video for "Ti si moj greh" had an ancient Egyptian theme, with Brena dressed as a pharaoh. It is the Serbian version of the song "Pia Prosefhi" by Elina Konstantopoulou which represented Greece in the Eurovision Song Contest 1995.

Song "Luda za tobom" is Serbian version song "Astatos" by Pasxalis Terzis from Greece. That song is released in 1994. Shortly after Lepa Brena's version, versions of the same song were released in Bulgaria in 1999 (Kamelia – Luda po tebe) and a year later in Poland (Diana – Pójdę za tobą), with the greatest similarities between all versions of the same song being found in the chorus. Later, "Luda za tobom" was adapted in other countries, such as Romania.

Brena became co-founder of the Serbian record label Grand Production in December 1998.

=== 2000–2016: Pomračenje sunca, hiatus ===
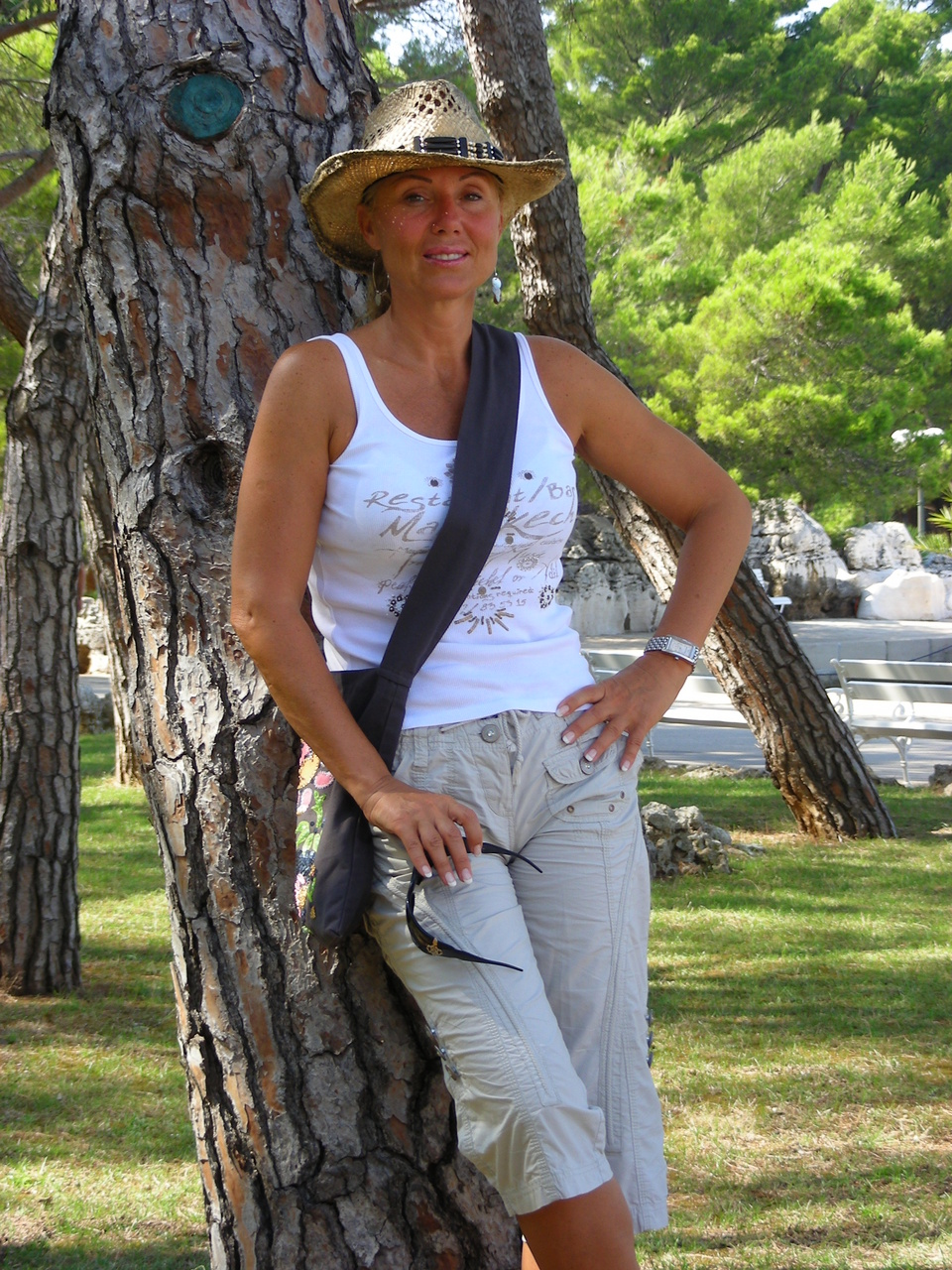
Brena in 2007

After her marriage in 1991, when she briefly moved to the United States, she ceased cooperation with Slatki Greh. However, in 2000 they recorded another album together Pomračenje sunca (Solar Eclipse), their last album to date. After eight years of absence from the music business, Lepa Brena returned with Uđi slobodno... (Feel Free to Enter..., 2008) and Začarani krug (Vicious Circle, 2011). Both albums were major successes.

On 15 June 2009, Brena performed in Zagreb for the first time since the breakup of Yugoslavia in 1990. 13,000 people filled the Arena Zagreb to see Brena on stage again after 19 years. Moved by the audience in Zagreb after so many years, Brena burst into tears at one point. She sang her songs from her new album, but she also reminded everyone present of the old hits that had elevated her to the very top of the music scene at the time. She started the concert with the song after which she named her latest album, Uđi slobodno.... At the end of the concert, Brena was joined on stage by her husband Slobodan Živojinović and sons Stefan and Viktor.

Beginning in 2012, Brena started recording sessions for two studio albums. The first, Izvorne i novokomponovane narodne pesme (Original and Newly Composed Folk Songs) was released in December 2013. She dedicated the album to her ailing mother Ifeta, who sang folk songs to her when she was a child. Ifeta died the following year.

In the month after that album's release, Brena premiered two other songs: "Ljubav čuvam za kraj" (I'm Keeping Love For the End) on 28 December 2013 and "Zaljubljeni veruju u sve" (Those in Love Believe in Everything), with lyrics written by Hari Varešanović, on 12 January 2014.

On 19 December 2013, Brena, along with Dragana Mirković, Severina, Jelena Rozga, Haris Džinović, Aca Lukas and Jelena Karleuša, was a guest at a humanitarian concert by Goran Bregović at the Zetra Olympic Hall in the Bosnian capital city Sarajevo for the Roma in Bosnia and Herzegovina. Brena arrived in Sarajevo two days before the concert so that she could enjoy the city with friends before the concert. She said in an interview: "Sarajevo has suffered and survived so much, I'm really glad to see positive people and happiness in this city".

Lepa Brena and Steven Seagal were the stars of Belgrade 2016 New Year party, an event held at Nikola Pašić Square in front of the Serbian National Assembly, and attended by 60 000 people.

=== 2017–2022: Comeback, World Tour, Lady B ===
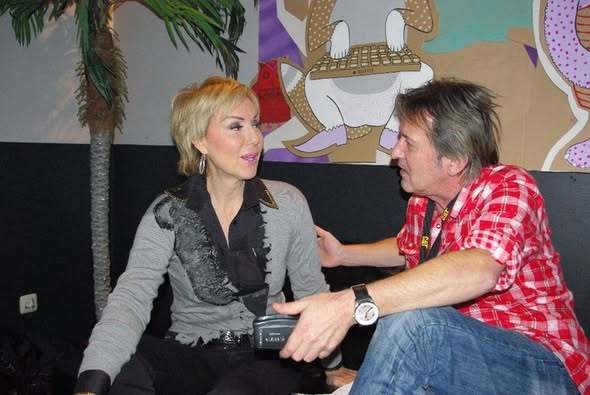
Brena and Zijad Žuna, 2015

In December 2017, Brena published two new songs "Zar je važno da l' se peva ili pjeva" (Does It Matter Whether It's Sung (in Ijekavian) or Sung (in Ekavian)) and "Boliš i ne prolaziš" (You Hurt and You Don't Heal) as teasers for her new album. In support of her new album, she organised a world tour. The tour Zar je važno da l' se peva ili pjeva... World Tour started on 11 November 2017 in Vienna, Austria, at the Lugner City. During the first European leg of her world tour, her album Zar je važno dal se peva ili pjeva was released on 1 March 2018, and it became a major hit in the Balkans.

After four legs of her World Tour, she announced a break because she wanted to be in Serbia, when her stepson Filip Živojinović and his wife Aleksandra Prijović get a baby. Two months after the pause, she continued the World Tour. A year after, she postponed all of her Tour concerts because of the COVID-19 pandemic. The tour ended on 28 October 2022 in Cleveland.

One month afterwards, she teased her new socks brand, Lady B. She stated that it's a "brand for a woman from the 21st century". It went for sale a few weeks later, with sales growing more and more.

=== 2023–2024: Aleksandra Prijović concerts, BiH tour ===
Brena and Senidah were part of the first Red Bull SoundClash in Belgrade. They performed together in June.

On 30 September, Brena was a guest at Aleksandra Prijović's second concert in Štark Arena. Their emotional moments together went viral on social media, and Aleksandra thanked Brena for treating her as her own child.

Brena performed with Aleksandra again, but this time with Jelena Rozga on 3 December in Arena Zagreb. Before the concert, she announced that she would be having a concert there, too, in December the next year. The tickets sold under 24 hours, and as for today there are four concerts announced there. During the third of five scheduled concerts at Arena Zagreb, Brena suffered a fractured ankle after a cameraman accidentally fell into a stage lift where she was waiting to make her entrance. The incident occurred shortly after a performance by Ana Bekuta, as stage preparations were underway for the next segment of the concert. Despite the injury, Brena completed the performance before seeking medical treatment. The remaining two concerts were subsequently postponed while she recovered. The injury was more serious than several minor injuries she had experienced earlier in her career.

In 2024, she announced her Bosnia and Herzegovina tour Imam pesmu da vam pevam (I Have a Song to Sing to You), where she is looking forward traveling her home country. The same year, Lepa Brena covered the November issue of Vogue Adria, becoming the first musician to appear on the cover.

== Personal life ==
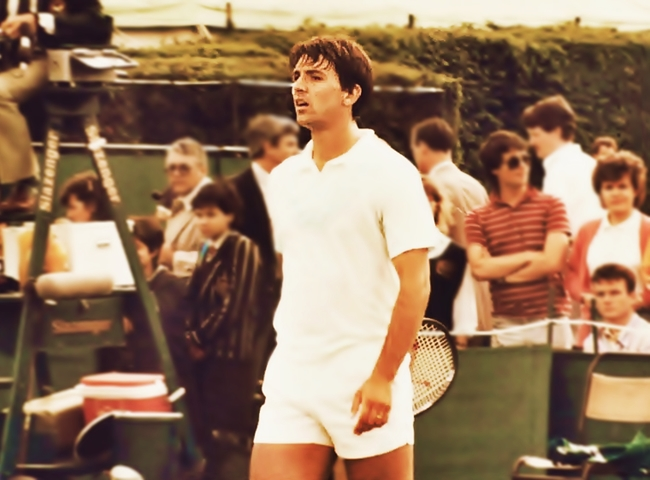
Professional tennis player Slobodan Živojinović, Brena's husband, 1980s

Her wedding to Serbian tennis star Slobodan Živojinović on 7 December 1991 was a media event throughout Yugoslavia. The lavish ceremony took place at Belgrade's InterContinental Hotel. The level of interest in the event was such that Brena's manager Raka Đokić released a VHS tape of the wedding. Their public relationship has been providing steady fodder for various tabloid publications ever since. Upon marriage, Brena became the stepmother to Živojinović's son Filip, born on 19 August 1985. Brena and Živojinović's first child together, a son named Stefan, was born in New York City on 21 May 1992. Their second son Viktor was born 30 March 1998. On 6 March 2019, Brena became a step-grandmother after Filip's wife Aleksandra Prijović gave birth to their first child together, son Aleksandar.

Brena broke her leg in a skiing accident in November 1992, and it took six months for her to heal. Her manager and producer Raka Đokić died suddenly on 30 October 1993.

On 23 November 2000, the couple's elder son Stefan was kidnapped by members of the Zemun mafia. After they paid a ransom of 2,500 000 Deutsche Marks in cash, he was released, having been held for five days. She has resided in Belgrade since 1980 and currently lives there with her husband, while their sons are studying in the United States. In a 2014 interview, she stated that she was still healing from the trauma of the kidnapping incident.

After the debacle and family drama, she went on hiatus once again, lasting eight years, living between Belgrade and Miami, Florida with her family. Brena and her husband have a home in Coconut Creek, Florida, where they lived during the 1999 NATO bombing of Yugoslavia, although Brena visited Yugoslavia during the bombing and took part on one of the public morale-raising concerts on Belgrade's Republic Square. She also has an apartment in Monte Carlo and another townhouse in Fisher Island, Florida. In 2010, Brena and her husband purchased a five-bedroom villa with an in-ground heated pool on one of Miami's islands at a cost of $1.6 million.

In October 2010, her father, Abid Jahić, was severely injured when a bus hit him as he walked in the town of Brčko. He was transported to a hospital in Tuzla, where he died on 22 October 2010 aged 82. He was buried in a Muslim funeral three days after his death. Brena, her two siblings and mother, along with other family members and citizens of Brčko attended the funeral. She later regarded the months after her father's death as the emotionally most difficult time of her life. Her mother Ifeta died 21 November 2014, aged 80. She was buried in a Muslim funeral in Brčko next to her husband.

Brena was hospitalized on 27 July 2012 when she complained of pain and was diagnosed as having venous thrombosis, a blood clot. She remained in the hospital for three days, then was released. A similar incident had occurred in October 2004 when a blood clot in her hand was removed. In August 2012, she was forced to cancel three months of scheduled concerts to deal with further complications with her illness.

She was again hospitalized on 25 July 2014 while at holiday in the Croatian resort of Novi Vinodolski where she fell down the stairs and broke both arms. She was hospitalized for five days and spent her month-long recovery at a local hotel. On 2 January 2015, Brena fell down the stairs again during a family vacation at Zlatibor, Serbia, and hurt her wrist. Unlike the previous incident, this injury did not require surgery. However, because of this, she stayed hospitalized in Belgrade and rescheduled upcoming performances in the Bosnian towns of Živinice and Travnik.

== In popular culture ==
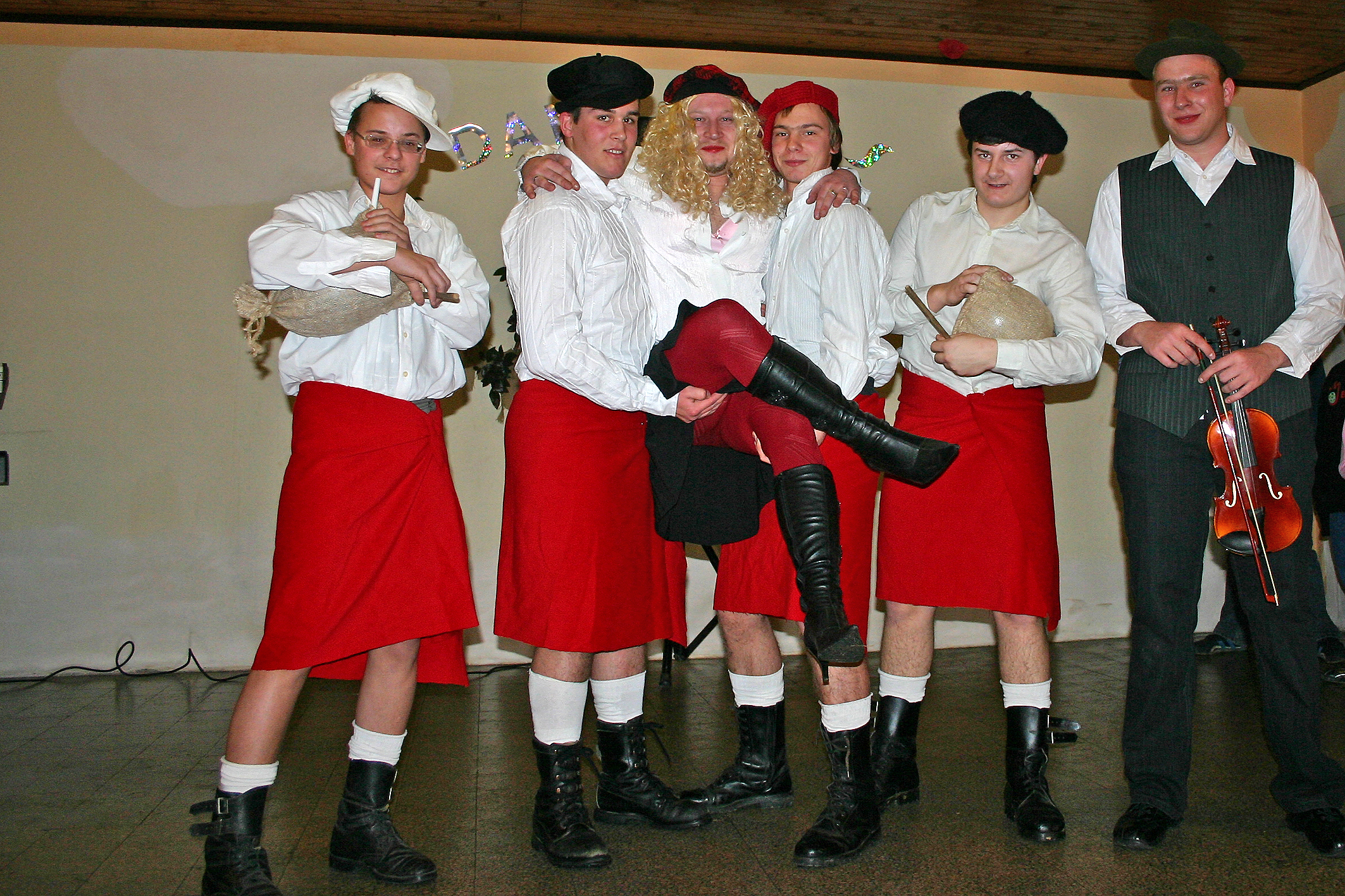
Group of men imitating Brena

- Dark Scene Records released in 2009 Dark Tribute to Lepa Brena, an electronic/rock album where 20 different artists interpret 20 of her songs.
- Lepa Brena Project, a Musical theatre show that is scheduled to perform in Boston (18 Dec), Toronto (21 Dec), and Chicago (22 Dec) 2024 is a Jukebox musical of Serbian production, where 5 Lepa Brenas represent different social-policital themes of past Yugoslavian life.
- On the Croatian singing show Tvoje lice zvuči poznato (Croatian iteration of the Your Face Sounds Familiar franchise), Lepa Brena was portrayed multiple times by Saša Lozar (2021), Mia Negovetić (2024), Marko Bošnjak (2025) and David Amaro (2026).

== Controversy ==
During the late 1980s and early 1990s, ethnic tensions, which started rising in Yugoslavia and eventually led to country's breakup, made Lepa Brena become one of main tabloid targets at the time. Some Bosniaks viewed her as a traitor as she was a Bosniak who sang and spoke with an Ekavian accent (which is predominantly spoken in Serbia) and she married Serbian Slobodan Živojinović. Several tabloids claimed that she had converted from Islam to Serbian Orthodoxy and that she had changed her name from Fahreta to Jelena. She intensely denied these allegations. In socialist Yugoslavia, religions in general were an unpopular topic, and people acknowledged the religion to which they belonged in relation to its family roots but were overwhelmingly non-practitioners. In that sense, being a Yugoslav icon, Lepa Brena never publicly spoke about her religious beliefs beyond stating that she had grown up being Sunni Muslim.

In 2009, numerous Bosniaks and Croats protested when her concerts in Sarajevo on 30 May and in Zagreb on 13 June were announced. The reason behind the protests were pictures allegedly shot in 1993 during the Bosnian War in which she appears wearing the uniform of the Army of Republika Srpska in the besieged town of Brčko, where she grew up. In the pictures, taken and published by one Serbian magazine, she appears giving support to Bosnian Serb soldiers, which were at that time involved in intense fighting against Croatian and Bosniak forces in Posavina front. Croatian and Bosnian protesters called her a "traitor" and a "četnikuša". The concerts went ahead as scheduled with no incidents. Brena then denied all of the allegations, explaining that the uniform was a costume she used for the music video of her song "Tamba lamba" in Hajde da se volimo: Udajemo Lepu Brenu. She also explained that she went to Brčko to save her parents because she got a message that they would be killed.

== Discography ==
=== Studio albums ===
- Čačak, Čačak (1982)
- Mile voli disko (1982)
- Bato, Bato (1984)
- Pile moje (1984)
- Voli me, voli (1986)
- Uske pantalone (1986)
- Hajde da se volimo (1987)
- Četiri godine (1989)
- Boli me uvo za sve (1990)
- Zaljubiška (1991)
- Ja nemam drugi dom (1993)
- Kazna Božija (1994)
- Luda za tobom (1996)
- Pomračenje sunca (2000)
- Uđi slobodno... (2008)
- Začarani krug (2011)
- Izvorne i novokomponovane narodne pesme (2013)
- Zar je važno dal se peva ili pjeva (2018)

=== Extended plays ===
- Sitnije, Cile, sitnije (1983)
- Jedan dan života (with Miroslav Ilić, 1985)

=== Compilations ===
- Lepa Brena & Slatki Greh (1990)
- Lepa Brena (The Best of – Dupli CD) (2003)
- Lepa Brena (HITOVI – 6 CD-a) (2016)

== Filmography ==
=== Film ===
- Tesna koža (1982)
- Nema problema (1984)
- Kamiondžije ponovo voze (1984)
- Hajde da se volimo (1987)
- Hajde da se volimo 2: Još jednom (1989)
- Hajde da se volimo 3: Udaje se Lepa Brena (1990)

=== Documentary ===
- Posao snova (2005)
- Lepa Brena: Godine Slatkog greha (2017)

=== Television ===
- Në orët e vona (1982)
- Jugovizija (1983)
- Kamiondžije 2 (1983)
- Jugovizija (1986)
- Obraz uz obraz: Novogodišnji special (1991) — TV film
- Novogodišnji show program sa Lepom Brenom (2002)
- Kursadžije (2007) — TV show; one episode role
- Mahalaši (2009) — Bosnian TV series; special guest star
- Damin Gambit (2014) — Croatian TV talkshow at Hrvatska radiotelevizija
- Veče sa Lepom Brenom (2014) — TV show
- Exkluziv (2014) — Serbian TV show at TV Prva; premiered 1 December 2014 entitled "O smrti majke Ifete"
- Paparazzi (2017) — Bulgarian TV show

== Tours and concerts ==
=== Tours ===
- Great Yugoslav Tour (1983)
- Great Yugoslav Tour '84 (1984)
- Uđi slobodno Tour (2008–11)
- Začarani krug Tour (2011–17)
- Zar je važno da l' se peva ili pjeva... World Tour (2017–22)
- Imam pesmu da vam pevam Tour (2024-26)

=== Residency concerts ===
- Lepa Brena Live at Dom sindikata (1987)

Awards
New title	Serbian Oscar of Popularity; The Female Folk Singer of the Year; 2009	Succeeded by Radmila Manojlović
