= Četiri godine =

Četiri godine Four Years

Studio album by Lepa Brena
- Released: 21 September 1989
- Genre: Pop folk
- Label: Diskoton
- Producer: Kornelije Kovač; Laza Ristovski; Raka Đokić (executive producer)

Lepa Brena chronology
Hajde da se volimo (1987)	Četiri godine Four Years (1989)	Boli me uvo za sve (1990)

Četiri godine (English: Four Years) is the eighth studio album by Yugoslavian pop-folk singer Lepa Brena and her band Slatki Greh. It was released 21 September 1989 through the record label Diskoton.

All of the songs became huge hits, but the song "Jugoslovenka" (sung with Alen Islamović, Danijel Popović and Vlado Kalember) is still today a well-known song all over the Balkans. It is considered an anthem to Yugonostalgists.

The music video for "Čuvala me mama" was filmed on the Croatian island Lopud.

This was her ninth of twelve albums with Slatki Greh.

This album was sold in a circulation of 650,000 copies.

== Track listing ==
No.	Title	Writer(s)	Producer(s)	Length
1.	"Četiri godine" (Four Years)	Milorad Cvetković	Kornelije Kovač
2.	"Biseru beli" (White Pearl)	Marina Tucaković; Aleksandar Radulović	Laza Ristovski
3.	"Jablane" (Poplar Tree)	Dino Merlin	Laza Ristovski
4.	"Igraj dragi" (Dance, Dear)	Dino Merlin	Laza Ristovski
5.	"Poželi sreću drugima" (Wish Happiness to Others)	Marina Tucaković; Aleksandar Radulović	Kornelije Kovač
6.	"Čuvala me mama" (My Mom Took Care of Me)	Miroslav Zec	Kornelije Kovač
7.	"Jugoslovenka" (Yugoslav Girl) (featuring Alen Islamović, Danijel Popović, Vlado Kalember)	Miloš Mandić; Marija Ćajić	Kornelije Kovač
8.	"Imam pesmu da vam pevam" (I Have a Song to Sing to You)	Zoran Matić	Kornelije Kovač
9.	"Ja pripadam samo tebi" (I Belong Only to You)	Milorad Cvetković	Kornelije Kovač
10.	"Vrati mi srce" (Give Back My Heart)	Zoran Matić	Laza Ristovski
11.	"Sokole" (Falcon)	S. Veljković	Kornelije Kovač
12.	"Robinja" (Slave)	Milorad Cvetković	Kornelije Kovač

== Personnel ==
=== Instruments ===
- Jose Luis Iglesias – electric guitar

=== Production and recording ===
- Enrique Kintana – recording
- Vladimir Negovanović – recording
