= Izvorne i novokomponovane narodne pesme =

Izvorne i novokomponovane narodne pesme Original and Newly Composed Folk Songs

Studio album by Lepa Brena
- Released: 11 December 2013
- Recorded: 2012–13
- Studio: Studio Ton (Kraljevo, Serbia); Grand Studio (Belgrade)
- Genre: Folk; sevdalinka
- Length: 67:19
- Label: Grand Production
- Producer: Dragan Stojković Bosanac

Lepa Brena chronology
Začarani krug (2011)	Izvorne i novokomponovane narodne pesme Original and Newly Composed Folk Songs (2013)	Lepa Brena (HITOVI – 6 CD-a) (2016)

Izvorne i novokomponovane narodne pesme is the seventeenth studio album by pop-folk singer Lepa Brena. It was released 11 December 2013 through the record label Grand Production. The record was primarily produced by Dragan Stojković Bosanac.

== Release ==
On February 13, 2013 Brena announced that she will publish the album of original and newly composed folk dedicated to her mother. "I'm doing a new album, something different, something I love and what I enjoy. I record original songs, I'm doing it slowly because I'm not in a hurry anymore. I still do not know how many tracks will be on the album and when I publish it. These songs are singing in a specific way, and you can not love them. All my life, I had to make songs for other people. I do not have to do anything at the moment and I want to dedicate the edition to my mother Ifeta. Thanks to her I learned to sing and love many beautiful original songs.

== Background ==
Nineteen old hits by Lepa Brena were included on her new album, which, as she had previously announced, she dedicated to her mother Ifeta, who sang folk songs to her when she was a child.. Namely, Brena recently said that her mother is waiting for an operation, which of course is very worrying for the singer. Therefore, the new album dedicates to her, so that with the old hits she likes, she can easily overcome the health problems. "I've been thinking all my life about how in music I never did anything for my parents. My father, unfortunately, did not live to hear that I recorded many tracks he loved very much. So I dedicate this album to my mother because I recorded the songs she sang to me when I was a little girl." — said Brena.

Her mother died on 21 November 2014, less than a year after the album's release.

== Track listing ==
No.	Title	Writer(s)	Length
1.	"Jutros mi je ruža procvetala"	Petar Tanasijević, Branimir Đokić	4:09
2.	"Bisenija, kćeri najmilija"	Miodrag Krnjevac	3:14
3.	"Čuvam ovce kraj zelene jove"		2:56
4.	"Ah što ćemo ljubav kriti"		5:40
5.	"U Stambolu na Bosforu"		4:16
6.	"Snijeg pade na behar na voće"		3:33
7.	"Ah moj Aljo"		3:42
8.	"Sejdefu majka buđaše"		4:13
9.	"Srdo moja ne srdi se na me"		2:48
10.	"Tamburalo momče u tamburu"		3:28
11.	"Magla padnala"		4:16
12.	"Aj, veseli se kućni domaćine"		2:41
13.	"Obraše se vinogradi"	Dragiša Nedović	2:30
14.	"Mito bekrijo"	Radoslav Graić	5:56
15.	"Ej, kad sam sinoć"		2:32
16.	"Nad izvorom vrba se nadnela"	Tomislav i Andrija Bajić	3:32
17.	"Ciganine ti što sviraš"	Budimka Živković, Predrag Živković Tozovac	4:22
18.	"Kad zaškripi kapija"	Radoslav Graić, Dragan Stojković Bosanac	3:54
19.	"Simbil cveće"		3:37
Total length:			67:19

== Year-end charts ==
Chart (2013)	Position
Balkanmedia Shop (bestsellers)	1

== Personnel ==
=== Crew ===
- Accordion – Aleksandar Sofronijević
- Arranged By – Aleksandar Sofronijević (tracks: 3 to 12, 15, 19)
- Bass Guitar – Nikola Labović
- Clarinet, Saxophone, Fife – Marko Kojadinović
- Flute – Nevenka Tomašević
- Goblet Drum – Dragan Stojković
- Guitar – Aleksandar Popović
- Mastered By – Daniel Jovanović*
- Mixed By, Edited By – Zoran Beočanin Sotir
- Orchestrated By – Aleksandar Sofronijević
- Producer – Dragan Stojković-Bosanac*
- Violin – Nemanja Mijatović, Stefan Ilić
- Written-By – Narodna* (tracks: 3 to 12, 15, 19)
