= Nema problema (1984 film) =

Nema Problema is a 1984 Yugoslav comedy genre film and the first movie with folk music singer Lepa Brena in the main role. After this movie the film series Hajde da se volimo was begun. The director of the movie is Mića Milošević and the writer was Sinisa Pavic. It was released on 29 October 1984.

== Plot summary ==
The manager of a company (played by Nikola Simić) gets in trouble when he cannot pay his workers. Billions were spent on a football stadium which is now empty, and the bank did not approve requests for credit for the seemingly meaningless investments. Maybe the stadium will get filled during a concert by a popular singer Lepa Brena (played by herself).
