= Mont-Carmel, Prince Edward Island =

Canadian unincorporated area

Coordinates: 46.4498°N 64.0010°W

Location of Mont-Carmel in Prince Edward Island

Mont Carmel is a Canadian unincorporated area in Prince County, Prince Edward Island. The community is located in the "Evangeline Region," which is a cluster of Acadian communities in the central part of Prince County. The village is home to the Notre-Dame-du-Mont-Carmel, a massive 450,000-brick Catholic church built in 1898. Mont Carmel is known for its strong Acadian heritage, and the community hosts several cultural events each year to celebrate Acadian music and traditions.

== See also ==
- List of communities in Prince Edward Island
