= Uske pantalone =

Uske pantalone Tight Pants

Studio album by Lepa Brena
- Released: 27 November 1986
- Genre: Pop folk
- Label: PGP-RTB
- Producer: Aleksandar Radulović

Lepa Brena chronology
Voli me, voli (1986)	Uske pantalone Tight Pants (1986)	Hajde da se volimo (1987)

Uske pantalone (Tight Pants) is the sixth studio album by Yugoslavian pop-folk singer Lepa Brena and her band Slatki Greh. It was released 27 November 1986 through the record label PGP-RTB.

This was her seventh of twelve albums with Slatki Greh.

The album was sold in a circulation of 600,000 copies.

== Track listing ==
No.	Title	Writer(s)	Length
1.	"Uske pantalone" (Hot Pants)	Milutin Popović	2:32
2.	"Sviraj Rock 'n' Roll" (Play Rock 'n' Roll)	Marina Tucaković; Aleksandar Radulović	3:09
3.	"Disko urnebes" (Disco Rumpus)	Milutin Popović	2:38
4.	"Oj, Dragana, Dragana" (Oh, Dragana, Dragana)	Miodrag Ž. Ilić; Predrag Negovanović	2:44
5.	"Zakuni se" (Swear)	Milutin Popović	3:29
6.	"Moja Roso" (My Dewdrop (term of endearment))	Marina Tucaković; Aleksandar Radulović	2:37
7.	"Okrećeš mi leđa" (You Turn Your Back On Me)	Marina Tucaković; Aleksandar Radulović	3:43
8.	"Širi dragi ruke" (Spread Your Arms, Dear)	Marina Tucaković; Mila Janković; Predrag Negovanović	2:40
9.	"Pazi šta radiš" (Careful What You Do)	Miodrag Ž. Ilić; Predrag Negovanović	3:01
10.	"Afrika" (Africa)	Milutin Popović	3:02

== Personnel ==
=== Production and recording ===
- Zoran Radetić – engineering
- Zoran Vukčević – engineering

=== Crew ===
- Ivan Ćulum – design
- Belmondo/Dragan Timotijević – photography
