= Jedan dan života =

EP by Lepa Brena and Miroslav Ilić
- Released: 27 May 1985
- Genre: Folk, pop
- Label: PGP-RTB
- Producer: Milutin Popović; Saša Popović; Raka Đokić (executive producer)

Lepa Brena chronology
Pile moje (1984)	Jedan dan života (1985)	Voli me, voli (1986)

Miroslav Ilić chronology
Putujem, putujem (1984)	Jedan dan života (1985)	Zoveš me na vino (1985)

"Jedan dan života" (Serbian Cyrillic: Један дан живота; transl. One Day of Life) is a collaborative maxi single by Yugoslav singers Lepa Brena and Miroslav Ilić. It was released 27 May 1985 through the record label PGP-RTB. Both "Jedan dan života" and "Živela Jugoslavija" topped the national music charts.

On 19 November 2010, Serbian tabloid SvetPlus chose "Jedan dan života" as the "Hit Song of the Day".

== Background ==
For the cooperation of Lepa Brena and Miroslav Ilić, the most important is Brena's manager Raka Đokić, who at that time became manager and Miroslav Ilić. All songs from the album became big hits. In the summer of 1985, Brena and Miroslav started together on a stadium tour in Yugoslavia, in order to promote their album. The album was sold in 800,000 copies.

== Track listing ==
No.	Title	Writer(s)	Length
1.	"Jedan dan života" (One Day of Life)	Mira Timić; Milutin Popović
2.	"Pričali su pričali" (They Talked, They Talked)	Milutin Popović
3.	"Živela Jugoslavija" (Long Live Yugoslavia)	Milutin Popović
4.	"Volimo se iz inata" (We Love One Another Out of Spite)	Mira Timić; Milutin Popović

== Personnel ==
=== Production and recording ===
- Mića Đordević – supervisor
- Dragan Vukićević – engineering
- Stanko Terzić – editing

=== Crew ===
- Ivan Ćulum – design
- Ivan Mojašević – photography

== Release history ==
List of regions, release dates, showing formats, label and reference
Region	Date	Format(s)	Label	Ref.
SFR Yugoslavia	May 27, 1985	vinyl; Cassette	PGP-RTB	
