= Pile moje =

Pile moje My Dear

Studio album by Lepa Brena
- Released: 17 November 1984
- Genre: Pop folk
- Label: PGP-RTB
- Producer: Predrag Vuković; Saša Popović; Milija Đokić (executive producer)

Lepa Brena chronology
Bato, Bato (1984)	Pile moje My Dear (1984)	Jedan dan života (1985)

Pile moje is the fourth studio album by Yugoslav pop-folk singer Lepa Brena and her band Slatki Greh. It was released 17 November 1984 through the record label PGP-RTB.

The album name translated, literally means "My Chick" (as in baby chicken). Chick is a term of endearment in Serbo-Croatian, synonymous with dear.

This was her fifth of twelve albums with Slatki Greh.

== Background ==
The main producer of the album this time was Milija Đokić. The album was promoted in the New Year's national television program in which viewers had the opportunity to see Lepa Brena in Hollywood releases. After this album, Lepa Brena received the Oscar of Popularity and was named the singer of the year. The album sold 500,000 copies.

== Track listing ==
No.	Title	Writer(s)	Length
1.	"Pile moje" (My Dear (lit. 'little bird'))	Slavica Vuković
2.	"Mani zemlju koja Bosnu nema" (Forget a Country That Doesn't Have Bosnia)	Sreten Gajić
3.	"Ljubi me, Šabane" (Kiss Me Šaban)	Marina Tucaković; Aleksandar Radulović
4.	"Perice, moja merice" (Percy, Mercy Me)	Marina Tucaković; Aleksandar Radulović
5.	"Moram nešto ljubiti" (I Have to Kiss Something)	Miodrag Ž. Ilić; Miroljub Aranđelović
6.	"Bobo, Bobo"	Miša Marković
7.	"Šeik" (Sheikh)	Marina Tucaković; Lj. Stepanović; Saša Popović
8.	"Mače moje" (My Sweetheart (lit. 'kitten'))	Marina Tucaković; Kornelije Kovač
9.	"Nežna žena" (Sensitive Woman)	Radmila Mudrinić; Saša Popović
10.	"Janoš"	Marina Tucaković; Kornelije Kovač
11.	"Đorđe" (George)	Marina Tucaković; Saša Popović
12.	"Šećeru, šećeru" (Sugar, Sugar)	Slobodan Cvetković; Predrag Vuković

== Personnel ==
=== Production and recording ===
- Dragan Vukićević – recording

=== Crew ===
- Ćulum – design
- Ivan Mojašević – photography

== Release history ==
List of regions, release dates, showing formats, label and reference
Region	Date	Format(s)	Label	Ref.
SFR Yugoslavia	November 17, 1984	vinyl; Cassette	PGP-RTB	
