= Voli me, voli =

Voli me, voli Love Me, Love Me

Studio album by Lepa Brena
- Released: 19 March 1986
- Genre: Pop folk
- Label: PGP-RTB
- Producer: Saša Popović; Raka Đokić (executive producer)

Lepa Brena chronology
Jedan dan života (1985)	Voli me, voli Love Me, Love Me (1986)	Uske pantalone (1986)

Voli me, voli (Love Me, Love Me) is the fifth studio album by Yugoslav pop-folk singer Lepa Brena and her band Slatki Greh. It was released 19 March 1986 through the record label PGP-RTB.

This was her sixth of twelve albums with Slatki Greh.

The album was sold in a circulation of 650,000 copies.

== Track listing ==
No.	Title	Writer(s)	Length
1.	"Voli me, voli" (Love Me, Love Me)	Saša Marković; Milutin Popović	3:42
2.	"Lažu te dušo moja" (They Are Lying to You, My Dear)	Radmila Mudrinić; Slobodan Đurđević	3:26
3.	"Jedna pesma za hiljadu dece" (One Song for a Thousand Children)	Milutin Popović	3:22
4.	"Sve bih dala da si moj" (I Would Give Everything To Make You Mine)	Marina Tucaković	3:09
5.	"Nova šota" (New Shota)	Mira Timić; Milutin Popović	3:00
6.	"Miki, Mićo"	Zoran Vasilić	3:01
7.	"Što si mala mršava k'o grana" (Why Are You Skinny Like a Branch)	G.Krupa; Predrag Negovanović; Rešad Jahija	3:30
8.	"Ljubim te ja" (I'm Kissing You)	Marina Tucaković	3:14
9.	"Priznaj mi, priznaj" (Admit to Me, Admit to Me)	Marina Tucaković; Saša Popović	3:43
10.	"Dud"	Milorad Todorović; Milutin Popović	2:00
11.	"Sta mi vredi čak i zlato" (What Is Even Gold Worth to Me)	Milutin Popović	2:55

== Personnel ==
=== Production and recording ===
- Mića Đordević – supervisor
- Dragan Vukićević – engineering
- Stanko Terzić – editing

=== Crew ===
- Ivan Ćulum – design
- Ivan Mojašević – photography
