= A Tight Spot =

- The movie's VHS home video cover.
- Directed by: Mića Milošević
- Written by: Siniša Pavić; Ljiljana Pavić
- Produced by: Dragoljub Vojnov
- Starring: Nikola Simić; Ružica Sokić; Milan Gutović; Irfan Mensur; Lepa Brena
- Cinematography: Aleksandar Petković
- Edited by: Branka Čeperac
- Music by: Vojislav Kostić; Riblja Čorba
- Release date: 24 September 1982
- Running time: 92 minutes
- Country: Yugoslavia
- Language: Serbian

A Tight Spot (Serbo-Croatian: Tesna koža, lit. 'Tight skin') is a 1982 Yugoslav comedy film directed by Mića Milošević and written by Siniša Pavić along with Ljiljana Pavić. The film achieved enormous popularity throughout SFR Yugoslavia, spawning three sequels by the end of the decade.

The story centers around Dimitrije "Mita" Pantić, a bewildered clerk in his mid-fifties working in a crusty state-owned company under corrupt boss Srećko Šojić. Constantly frustrated and stressed out, Pantić's personal life isn't much better either. Living in a cramped apartment with his wife Sida and their three grown children Branko, Mira, and Aca, each with their own problems, Pantić also has to endure his cranky mother and a state-assigned subtenant Suzana under the same roof.

== Plot ==
At 56 years of age Mita Pantić (Nikola Simić) is still only a junior clerk in a Yugoslav state-owned company. Another typical workday for him is starting at 6 a.m. as frustration awaits at every turn from the moment he gets up. Trying to get ready to go to work, he can barely get a turn to use the bathroom in a crowded apartment he shares with his family. Other members of the household are not without their frustrations either, meaning that nagging and shouting are a staple of their home life at any time of day.

Pantić's spouse Sida (Ružica Sokić) is a crabby middle-aged housewife whose complaints cover a wide range: from being unhappy about having to penny-pinch when grocery shopping to what she sees as personal lack of nice memories to look back on before old age because her best years were spent tending after the house and the family. The oldest child, son Branko (Gojko Baletić), an eternal university student majoring in astronomy, has a gripe about not having enough money for books and kits, which in his opinion prevents him from finally graduating. The middle child, daughter Mira (Danica Maksimović), has a law degree but can not find a job despite trying for years - she's also unhappy about lack of funds in the family because she thinks the ability to dress more attractively or to outright bribe would help her finally land a job. Finally, the youngest child Aca (Aleksandar Todorović), who is 16, has problems with discipline in high school and wants his father to buy him new textbooks and also a motorbike. Pantić's household also features his cranky mother (Rahela Ferari) and a sub-tenant Suzana (Jelica Sretenović) who is assigned there by the state due to housing shortage and given a room that takes up 9.4 m^{2} of their apartment.

All the morning commotion at home leads to Pantić often being late for work where more frustration awaits. On this particular occasion, it's his crooked boss Srećko Šojić (Milan Gutović) barging into his office, ripping up reports and demanding Pantić has them re-typed because they're not legible enough to read. That leads Pantić back to the keyboarding department where a new young typist Melita Sandić (Nada Vojinović), who typed up the messy reports in the first place, seems more interested in chatting and flirting over the phone than doing her job. Pantić loses his patience and has her report to the director for incompetence.

Meanwhile, Pantić's youngest son Aca is having problems with his demanding and nitpicky English professor (Irfan Mensur) who obsessively makes his students dissect the linguistic nuances of Leigh Hunt's poem "Jenny kiss'd Me". Nicknamed Japanac (The Japanese) due to his deep admiration of Japanese culture and way of life, the professor has a low tolerance for Aca's smart-alecky retorts and demands to speak to his father.

Back at Mita's work, it's time to collect monthly paycheques, but he is horrified to find out his pay has been docked due to his tardiness as part of the company's new initiative to maximize productivity. Hopping mad, he storms back to his office but is soon approached by an unknown man who introduces himself as Oliver Nedeljković (Vladan Živković) and proceeds to offer Pantić a bribe in return for his approval when it comes to a decision on new hiring. Though short on money, Pantić refuses the payoff and reports the corruption attempt to director Šojić.

Japanac soon comes to Pantić household in order to speak to Aca's father but finds Pantić feverishly listening to radio football broadcasts as he placed a bet on that week's Yugoslav First and Second league fixtures. Little by little, Pantić's predictions are proven right and he has 12 correct guesses with only the outcome of the Sloboda vs. Vardar match deciding if he wins the grand payout. Meanwhile, Japanac can not get a word in edgewise and as he is getting ready to leave, bumps into the subtenant Suzana who invites him into her room where they hit it off immediately. Back in his part of the apartment, Pantić collapses on the floor upon finding out the game ended in a draw, which means he missed the grand payout.

Japanac and Pantić eventually do meet to talk in Japanac's apartment, but this time the professor is more interested in discussing Pantić's subtenant than his son. Japanac expresses his desire to marry Suzana, which Pantić sees as a way to finally be rid of her.

Pantić cashes in his 12 correct guesses ticket for which he gets YUD7 million. Coming into work to he gets mad when he finds out Nedeljković, the man who attempted to bribe him got the job and goes to confront Šojić only to find out that Melita has advanced to the position of Šojić's personal typist, much to Pantić's annoyance and frustration after which he insults Šojić and leaves.

Back home with 7 million in cash in his bag, he wakes up the next morning to usual morning routine of family nagging and complaining about money. Sick and tired of listening to their complaints he reaches into his bag and starts throwing bills in the air. Then on the way to the bathroom, he runs into Japanac who informs him that he married Suzana and moved into her room, as the house in which he met with Pantić was his friend's house. Japanac puts a bathroom schedule and enters the bathroom. After walking silently an angry Pantić screams, charges at the bathroom door and breaks it as the film ends.

== Cast ==
- Nikola Simić as Dimitrije "Mita" Pantić
- Milan Gutović as Srećko Šojić
- Ružica Sokić as Persida "Sida" Pantić
- Irfan Mensur as Japanac, high school English professor
- Jelica Sretenović as Suzana, the subtenant
- Gojko Baletić as Branko Pantić
- Danica Maksimović as Mira Pantić
- Aleksandar Todorović as Aleksandar "Aca" Pantić
- Rahela Ferari as Mita's mother
- Nada Vojinović as Melita Sandić, Šojić's personal typist
- Vladan Živković as Oliver Nedeljković
- Lepa Brena as herself
- Mirjana Joković as the girl with the walkman in Aca's English class (uncredited)

== Production ==
The film features six songs — "U dva će čistači odneti đubre", "Kad ti se na glavu sruši čitav svet", "Ja ratujem sam", "Pravila, pravila", "Kako je lepo biti glup" and "Dobro jutro" — that also appear as tracks on Riblja Čorba's 1982 album Buvlja pijaca, which got released one month after the movie's premiere. Though not conceptualized as A Tight Spot soundtrack album, with the band essentially using the movie as a promotional vehicle for their upcoming album, many ended up thinking of Buvlja pijaca as the film's soundtrack.

The character of Srećko Šojić had already appeared a year earlier as supporting character in 1981's Laf u srcu, a comedy film also written by Siniša Pavić and directed by Mića Milošević.
