= Mile voli disko =

Mile voli disko Mile Loves the Disco

Studio album by Lepa Brena
- Released: 18 November 1982
- Genre: Pop folk
- Label: PGP-RTB
- Producer: Milutin Popović

Lepa Brena chronology
| Čačak, Čačak (1982) | Mile voli disko Mile Loves the Disco (1982) | Sitnije, Cile, sitnije (1983) |

Mile voli disko is the second studio album by Yugoslav pop-folk singer Lepa Brena and her band Slatki Greh. It was released 18 November 1982 through the record label PGP-RTB.

This was her second of twelve albums with Slatki Greh.

== Background ==
Like the previous one, the tracks on the album were written by Milutin Popovic Zahar. Three hit singles on the album were "Mile voli disko", "Duge noge" and "Dama iz Londona". For the purpose of promoting the album, Brena and Slatki Greh appeared in the film A Tight Spot, in which Brena sang two songs. In addition to numerous witty scenes in the film, the most highlighted is when Srećko Šojić tells "Lepa Brena for four people".

The album was sold in a circulation of 780,000 copies.

== Track listing ==
| No. | Title | Writer(s) | Length |
|---|---|---|---|
| 1. | "Mile voli disko" (Mile Loves the Disco) | Milutin Popović | 2:55 |
| 2. | "Duge noge" (Long Legs) | Milutin Popović | 3:09 |
| 3. | "Danas plačem ja, a sutra ćeš ti" (Today I'm Crying, Tomorrow You Will) | Milutin Popović | 2:50 |
| 4. | "Došlo vreme da se pođe" (The Time Has Come to Leave) | Milutin Popović | 4:02 |
| 5. | "Čini Gajle" (Gajle Does) | Milutin Popović | 2:21 |
| 6. | "Dama iz Londona" (The Dame from London) | Milutin Popović | 2:55 |
| 7. | "Ne postoji juče, ne postoji sutra" (Yesterday Does Not Exist, Tomorrow Does Not Exist) | Milutin Popović | 3:30 |
| 8. | "Ovaj život vara nas" (This Life Tricks Us) | Milutin Popović | 3:02 |
| 9. | "Još juče za tebe dala bih sve" (Even Yesterday I Would Have Given Everything for You) | Milutin Popović | 2:58 |
| 10. | "Ilijo, mori bekrijo" (Ilijo, My Drunkard) | Milutin Popović | 1:46 |

== Personnel ==
=== Production and recording ===
- Milutin Popović – arrangement
- Petar Gaković – producer

=== Crew ===
- Mića Isailović – photography

== Release history ==
List of regions, release dates, showing formats, label and reference
| Region | Date | Format(s) | Label | Ref. |
|---|---|---|---|---|
| SFR Yugoslavia | November 18, 1982 | vinyl; Cassette | PGP-RTB | |
