= Sitnije, Cile, sitnije =

- 12" vinyl cover

Single by Lepa Brena
- B-side: "Dama iz Londona" (7" vinyl); "Hej, najluđe moje" (12" vinyl)
- Released: 16 March 1983 (12" vinyl)
- Genre: Turbo-folk
- Length: 3:03
- Label: PGP-RTB
- Composer: Kornelije Kovač
- Lyricist: Marina Tucaković

Lepa Brena singles chronology
"Mile voli disko" / "Duge noge" (1983)	"Sitnije, Cile, sitnije" / "Hej, najluđe moje" (1983)	"Pile moje" / "Šeik" (1984)

"Sitnije, Cile, sitnije" is a song by Yugoslav pop-folk singer Lepa Brena. It was released as a 12" vinyl single on 16 March 1983 through the record label PGP-RTB.

== Background ==
With "Sitnije, Cile, sitnije", Lepa Brena participated in Jugovizija, the Yugoslav selection for the Eurovision Song Contest 1983, held on 16 March 1983 in the studio RTV Novi Sad in Novi Sad. Given the type of music they performed, their participation in this type of competition caused many surprises, but also disappointment with their fans, because Lepa Brena and Slatki Greh finished only seventh on Jugovizija. The winner was Danijel Popović with the song "Džuli", taking the fourth place at Eurovision, this repeating until then the greatest success of Yugoslav representatives in this type of competition. The song became a big hit, and the singer and the whole group achieved even greater popularity.

Immediately after Jugovizija, the single "Sitnije, Cile, sitnije", published by the production company PGP RTB, was launched and quickly achieved a tremendous success with 800,000 copies sold. After that, their first major tour of Yugoslavia followed, concerts with a record number of visitors, thanks to which, according to Lepa Brena herself, she deserves to be attributed the status of an "undisputed star".

The same year, music group Griva made a heavy metal parody on Brena's Eurovision debacle. The composition was titled "Sitnije, sestro, sitnije" and it was printed in 120,000 copies, published by Jugoton. With good marketing support, Griva was then placed at the very top of the Yugoslav rock scene.

== Track listing ==
7" and 12" vinyl side A
No.	Title	Lyrics	Music	Length
1.	"Sitnije, Cile, sitnije"	Marina Tucaković	Kornelije Kovač	3:03

7" vinyl side B
No.	Title	Writer(s)	Length
2.	"Dama iz Londona"	Milutin Popović Zahar	2:47

12" vinyl side B
No.	Title	Lyrics	Music	Length
2.	"Hej, najluđe moje"	Tucaković	Kovač	3:24

Notes

- "Dama iz Londona" is taken from Brena's 1982 studio album Mile voli disko.

== Personnel ==
=== Crew ===
- Ivan Ćulum – design
- Dragoljub Milovanović – photography

== Release history ==
List of regions, release dates, showing formats, label and reference
Region	Date	Format(s)	Label	Ref.
Yugoslavia	16 March 1983	12" vinyl	PGP-RTB	

== Sales ==
Region	Certification	Certified units/sales
Yugoslavia	—	600,000
