= Nikola Simić (actor) =

Serbian actor and comedian (1934–2014)

- Никола Симић
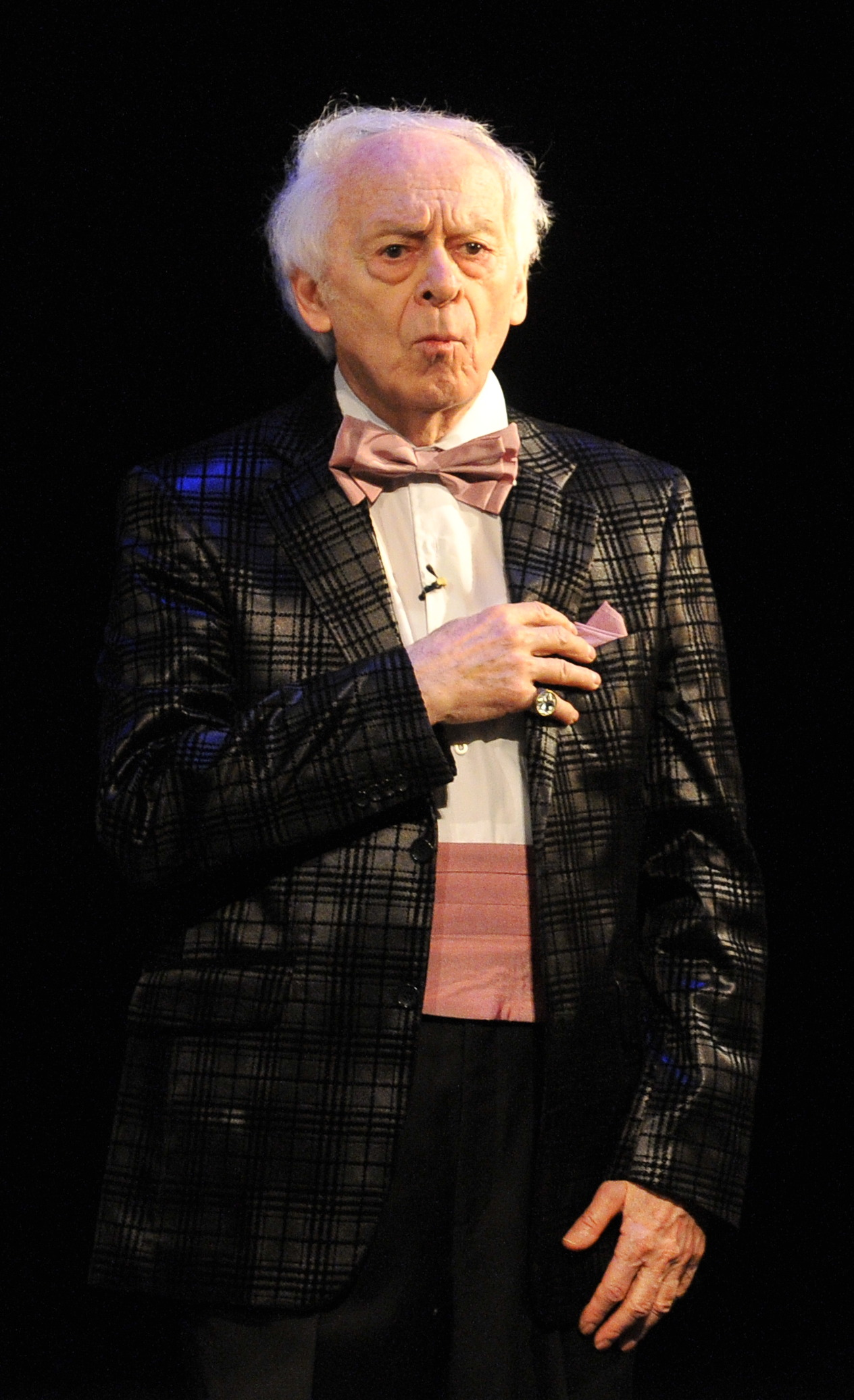
- Simić in 2011
- Born: 18 May 1934; Belgrade, Kingdom of Yugoslavia
- Died: 9 November 2014 (aged 80); Belgrade, Serbia
- Occupation: Actor
- Years active: 1957–2014
- Height: 1.75 m (5 ft 9 in)

Nikola Simić (Serbian Cyrillic: Никола Симић; 18 May 1934 – 9 November 2014) was a Serbian actor and comedian, best known for his role as Mita Pantić in several films, most notably the 1982 Yugoslav film Tesna koža. He performed in more than 160 films beginning in 1957. He was the official voice dub for Bugs Bunny in the Serbian dub of Looney Tunes.

== Selected filmography ==
Film
Year	Title	Role	Notes
2003	Strawberries in the Supermarket	Kobac	Jagoda u supermarketu (Serbian title)
2001	Boomerang	Aprcović	
1998	Barking at the Stars	Direktor škole	Lajanje na zvezde (Serbian title)
1991	Aliens are to Blame for Everything	Svemirac	Svemirci su krivi za sve (Serbo-Croatian title)
1984	Nema problema	Milenko Pantić	
1984	Strangler vs. Strangler	Inspektor Ognjen Strahinjić	Davitelj protiv davitelja (Serbo-Croatian title)
1982	A Tight Spot	Dimitrije "Mita" Pantić	Tesna koža (Serbo-Croatian title)
