= Pomračenje sunca =

Pomračenje sunca Solar Eclipse

Studio album by Lepa Brena
- Released: 6 May 2000
- Genre: Pop folk
- Label: Grand Production
- Producer: Goran Ratković

Lepa Brena chronology
Luda za tobom (1996)	Pomračenje sunca Solar Eclipse (2000)	Lepa Brena (The Best of – Dupli CD) (2003)

Pomračenje sunca (Solar Eclipse) is the fourteenth studio album by Yugoslav pop-folk singer Lepa Brena. It was released 6 May 2000 through the record label Grand Production.

This was her final of twelve albums with the band that she started her career with called Slatki Greh. This was also a one-off studio album recorded with her band.

This album was sold in a circulation of 150,000 copies.

== Track listing ==
No.	Title	Writer(s)	Length
1.	"Pomračenje sunca" (Solar Eclipse)	Pera Stokanović
2.	"Meni je teško, najteže" (For Me It's Difficult, the Most Difficult)	Steva Simeunović
3.	"Kolovođa" (Kolo Leader)	Pera Stokanović
4.	"Crna kafa" (Black Coffee)	Pera Stokanović
5.	"Zaboravljena žena" (Forgotten Woman)	Pera Stokanović
6.	"Gde si ti" (Where Are You)	Perica Zdravković
7.	"Ti me podsećaš na sreću" (You Remind Me of Happiness)	Steva Simeunović
8.	"Ali Baba"	Pera Stokanović; Saša Popović
9.	"Voleo ne voleo" (Love It or Not)	Saša Dragić
10.	"Lepa Brena"	Saša Dragić

== Personnel ==
=== Instruments ===
- Ivica Maksimović – guitar
- Boki Milošević – clarinet
- Vlada Panović – accordion (9)
- Enes Mavrić – accordion (3)

=== Production and recording ===
- Goran Ratković – producing, engineering
- Đorđe Petrović – assistant engineering

=== Crew ===
- Dragan ŠuhART – design
- Dejan Milićević – photography
