= Začarani krug =

Studio album by Lepa Brena
- Released: July 20, 2011
- Recorded: 2010–2011
- Studios: Studio Prince (Belgrade, Serbia); ATG Recording Studio (Belgrade); Studio Sky; Atelje Louis; J.M. Sound Studio (Zagreb)
- Genres: Pop; folk; dance; sevdalinka
- Length: 37:12
- Label: Grand Production
- Producer: Željko Joksimović; (also Kiki Lesendrić, Atelje Trag, Nikša Bratoš, Dejan Abadić)

Lepa Brena chronology
Uđi slobodno... (2008)	Začarani krug (2011)	Izvorne i novokomponovane narodne pesme (2013)

Singles from Začarani krug
- 1. "Metak sa posvetom" Released: May 30, 2011; 2. "Biber" Released: June 7, 2011; 3. "Ne bih ja bila ja" Released: July 15, 2011; 4. "Briši me" Released: July 21, 2011; 5. "Uradi to" Released: July 27, 2011; 6. "Stakleno zvono" Released: October 8, 2011

Začarani krug is the sixteenth studio album by pop-folk singer Lepa Brena. It was released in presale on 20 July 2011 and for regular sale on 20 August 2011 through the record label Grand Production. The record was primarily produced by Željko Joksimović, Kiki Lesendrić, Atelje Trag, Nikša Bratoš and Dejan Abadić.

== Release ==
Brena first announced on May 27, 2011 that her sixteenth album would be titled Začarani krug and released on July 20, 2011. The album's lead single, "Metak sa posvetom", was released three days later. On June 7, Brena released a second single "Biber". On July 15, Brena released a third single "Ne bih ja bila ja" and promote in show Veče sa Ivanom Ivanovićem. All three videos were directed by Dejan Milićević.

== Background ==
Brena wanted the new album to have a specific Balkan sound. That's why she gathered a team of 7 authors from all parts the Balkans and started preparing for the new album. "The new album "Začarani krug" is a true Balkan concept. I wanted on this album to make a true Balkan concept and I succeeded in that. I am extremely pleased with the new album and I hope that I will soon share this opinion with the public. said Lepa Brena at a press conference, at which her were presented new songs." The authors of the new Brena's songs are: Petar Grašo, Antonija Šola, Željko Joksimović, Pera Zdravkovic, Hari Mata Hari, Kiki Lesendrić, Dragan Brajović Braja, Vladimir Graić, Aleksandar Perišić Romario and a group of arranger "Atelje Trag". Lepa Brena signed the contract with the Deputy General Director of the company Lukoil Constantin Polovtsev in ... Lepa Brena signed a cooperation agreement with Lukoils's Managing Director Konstantin Polovcev, expressing satisfaction with cooperation with one of the most successful oil companies, which is "a blend of beautiful, smart and useful". It was agreed that the album will be sold at 180 Lukoil Pumps stores, with a benefit card, which will enable customers to buy cheaper fuel.

== Promotion ==
On July 14, 2011 Brena announced concert in Belgrade Arena and promised that she going on a big world tour. "We will make Brena's big concert in the Belgrade Arena on October 20, when she is also her birthday. It will be a real spectacle after so many years. And then all major cities from Skopje to Ljubljana will be operating." said the organizer of the concert, Bane Obradović.

== Track listing ==
No.	Title	Writer(s)	Length
1.	"Metak sa posvetom" (Bullet With My Name On It)	Antonija Šola, Petar Grašo, Nikša Bratoš	4:45
2.	"Biber" (Pepper)	Marina Tucaković, Željko Joksimović	4:05
3.	"Ne bih ja bila ja" (I Wouldn't Be Myself)	Dejan Ivanović, Željko Joksimović	4:13
4.	"Još sam živa" (I'm Still Alive)	Darija Marić, Perica Zdravković	3:18
5.	"Briši me" (Forget (lit. Erase) Me)	Hajrudin "Hari" Varešanović, Fayo	4:09
6.	"Stakleno zvono" (Glass Bell)	Dragan Brajović, Dejan Abadić	4:03
7.	"Valja se" (It Matters)	Marina Tucaković, Kiki Lesandrić	4:13
8.	"Ćutim k'o stvar" (Silent As An 'Object')	Marina Tucaković, Kiki Lesandrić	3:58
9.	"Uradi to" (Do It!)	Marina Tucaković, Romario, Atelje Trag	4:27
Total length:			37:12

== Personnel ==
=== Crew ===
- Accordion – Željko Joksimović, Vladimir Milenković
- Acoustic Guitar, Electric Guitar – Nikša Bratoš, Petar Trumbetaš, Vasilije Stanković, Miro Asotić, Srđan Marković
- Backing Vocals – Dragan Brnas, Ivana Čabraja, Jadranka Krištof, Vladimir Pavelić, Ivana Peters
- Bass – Miroslav Tovirac
- Bouzouki – Petar Trumpetaš, Srđan Marković
- Engineer – Siniša Kokerić, Boris Gavrilović, Perica Kaluđerović
- Flute, Flute [Fife] – Nebojša Brdarić
- Kaval, duduk – Nebojša Brdarić
- Keyboards – Perica Kaluđerović, Predrag Milanović, Kiki Lesendrić, Nikola Miljković
- Percussion – Željko Joksimović, Zoran Kiki Čaušević
- Photography By – Nebojša Babić
- Producer – Nikša Bratoš, Željko Joksimović, Perica Zdravković, Hari Varešanović, Dejan Abadić, Kiki Lesendrić, Atelje Trag
- Drums – Željko Joksimović, Petar Radmilović, Zoran Kiki Čaušević
- Piano – Željko Joksimović, Perica Kaluđerović
- Violin – Tijana Milošević
- Saxophone, Trombone – Oliver Ereš
- Trumpet – Antonio Geček
- Lute [Šargija] – Srđan Marković

== Music videos ==
- Metak sa posvetom (Dejan Milićević / Zoran Shurbevski / Veljko Spasić)
- Ne bih ja bila ja (Dejan Milićević / Zoran Shurbevski)
- Briši me (Dejan Milićević / Zoran Shurbevski / Boško Jakovljević)
- Uradi to (Dejan Milićević / Zoran Shurbevski / Veljko Spasić)
- Stakleno zvono (Dejan Milićević / Nena Ilić, Zoran Shurbevski / Zoran Shurbevski, Aleksandar Kaprish)
- Biber (Dejan Milićević / Nena Ilić, Zoran Shurbevski / Aleksandar Kaprish)
