= Čačak, Čačak =

Studio album by Lepa Brena
- Released: 3 February 1982
- Genre: Pop folk
- Length: 26:05
- Label: PGP-RTB
- Producer: Milutin Popović

Lepa Brena chronology
Čačak, Čačak (1982)	Mile voli disko (1982)

Čačak, Čačak is the debut studio album by Yugoslav pop-folk singer Lepa Brena and her band Slatki Greh. It was released 3 February 1982 through the record label PGP-RTB.

This was Brena's first of twelve albums with Slatki Greh.

== Background ==
This is Brena's first album, after which she began her career and became the most popular singer in Yugoslavia. The most deserving of her media promotion was Milovan Ilic Minimaks. Since the appearance of Lepa Brena and Slatki Greh in the installation of the hit parade on Belgrade Television was thrown out because of the conditions, the scandalous and inappropriate dressing (Brena came to the recording in tight Bermudas, which she wore together with her mother), Minimaks on his own initiative in his author's broadcast, on the same television, inserted a recording of the performance of Brena's and Slatki Greh. She was until then only Brena, and he added the adjective Lepa, and announced it as a new Yugoslav star - Lepa Brena.

The album was sold in a circulation of 350,000 copies.

== Track listing ==
No.	Title	Writer(s)	Length
1.	"Čačak, Čačak" (Čačak, Čačak)	Milutin Popović	2:30
2.	"Otišla si sa salaša" (You Left the Farms)	Milutin Popović	2:38
3.	"Bez ljubavi sreće nema" (Without Love There Is No Happiness)	Ivan Glišić; Milutin Popović	3:05
4.	"Snela koka jaje" (The Chicken Laid an Egg)	Dragiša Penjin; Milutin Popović	2:13
5.	"Moj deda je bio kavaljer" (My Grandfather Was a Cavalier)		2:58
6.	"Lala iz Banata" (Lala from Banat)	Milutin Popović	2:35
7.	"Ljubi me, Omere" (Kiss Me, Omer)	Milutin Popović	2:58
8.	"Žeravica" (Ember)	Milutin Popović	2:28
9.	"Daleko je moja Mica" (My Mica is Far Away)	Milutin Popović	2:08
10.	"Snove snivam" (I Dream Dreams)	Laza Kostić; Milutin Popović	3:22

== Release history ==
List of regions, release dates, showing formats, label and reference
Region	Date	Format(s)	Label	Ref.
SFR Yugoslavia	February 3, 1982	vinyl; Cassette	PGP-RTB	
