= Hari Varešanović =

Bosnian musician (born 1961)

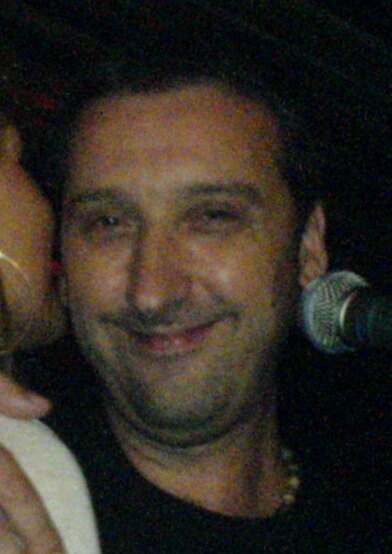
- Varešanović in 2006

Background information
- Also known as: Hari Mata Hari
- Born: Hajrudin Varešanović; 16 January 1961 (age 65); Sarajevo, PR Bosnia and Herzegovina, FPR Yugoslavia
- Genres: Pop rock
- Occupations: Musician, singer-songwriter
- Label: Hayat Production

Hajrudin "Hari" Varešanović (born 16 January 1961 in Sarajevo) is a Bosnian musician. Varešanović remains the vocal soloist, primary composer and lyricist for the musical group Hari Mata Hari.

== Biography ==
Hajrudin Varešanović was born in 1961 in Sarajevo as the second child of Reufik, a mechanic, and Zlata, a cashier. He grew up in the Vratnik neighborhood of Sarajevo's old town. His grandfather, Mehaga Varešanović, was one of the more well-known singers of traditional Bosnian music called sevdalinka.

At the age of six, Hajrudin began to sing and learned to play the guitar. He performed at the local cultural center; at the age of ten he sang with the group "Omi", and later for the group "Sedam šuma". In Vratnik, Hari recorded his first song "Zašto da ne uzmem nju".

In 1976, Hari joined the group Zov with whom he recorded the hit song "Poletjela golubica sa Baščaršije." Next, Varešanović sang with the group Ambasadori, with whom, it is said, that he matured into a professional artist. After his serving mandatory military service in the town of Niš, he appeared on the music scene by himself releasing the (1984) album Zlatne Kočije.

His professional career has lasted over a quarter of a century and he has performed at over 1,000 concerts. In 1999, Varešanović performed his song "Starac i More" in hope of representing Bosnia and Herzegovina at the Eurovision Song Contest 1999. However, after "Starac i More" had won it turned out the song had already been recorded, since Varešanović had sold the song to record label Unirecords in Finland, and Finnish artist Janne Hurme recorded that song in 1997 in name "Heart Blood" ("Sydänveri"). Hari Mata Hari was disqualified. The runner-up, Dino Merlin, was sent to the ESC instead.

In 1999, he recorded a duet with a famous fellow Bosnian singer, Hanka Paldum. The song, "Crni snijeg", was featured on her album Nek' je od srca and was covered later the same year by Serbian singer Ceca on her album Ceca 2000.

On 9 February 2006, the Bosnian television network PBSBiH announced that Hari Varešanović would represent Bosnia and Herzegovina with the song "Lejla" at the Eurovision Song Contest 2006.

Varešanović performed a song with music written by Serbian composer Željko Joksimović and lyrics written by Bosnian writer Fahrudin Pecikoza and Serbian Dejan Ivanović. Hari Varešanović told the Bosnian newspaper Nezavisne Novine:

... The song is the best in the world. I have to admit that I have not heard a better one. I am impressed with it and Pecikoza's lyrics. We have made a song that comes out the spirit of our people and I am glad to be singing it...

On 20 May 2006, Hari Varešanović and his group Hari Mata Hari reached third place at the Eurovision Song Contest 2006 held in Athens, Greece.

In 2011, Varešanović composed the music to and wrote the lyrics to Briši me, a song sung by Bosnian singer Lepa Brena for her sixteenth studio album Začarani krug. He also wrote the lyrics to her 2014 song Zaljubljeni veruju u sve.

== Personal life ==
On 14 February 2010, Varešanović married girlfriend Jasminka Ištuk from Osijek, Croatia. They live in Sarajevo and Munich. It is the second marriage for both. Each have children from previous marriages.

== Discography ==
=== Solo albums ===
- 1984 – Zlatne kočije

=== with Hari Mata Hari ===
- 1985 – Skini haljinu
- 1985 – U tvojoj kosi
- 1986 – Ne bi te odbranila ni cijela Jugoslavija
- 1988 – Ja te volim najviše na svijetu
- 1989 – Volio bi' da te ne volim
- 1990 – Strah me da te volim
- 1991 – Rođena si samo za mene
- 1994 – Ostaj mi zbogom ljubavi
- 1998 – Ja nemam snage da te ne volim
- 2001 – Baš ti lijepo stoje suze
- 2002 – Ružmarin
- 2004 – Zakon jačega
- 2009 – Sreća
- 2016 – Ćilim

Preceded by Feminnem with Call Me	Bosnia and Herzegovina in the Eurovision Song Contest (as part of Hari Mata Hari); 2006	Succeeded by Marija Šestić with Rijeka bez imena
