= Uđi slobodno... =

Studio album by Lepa Brena
- Released: June 28, 2008
- Studios: Studio Miligram (Belgrade, Serbia)
- Genres: Pop; folk; dance; rock
- Length: 37:25
- Labels: Grand Production; Miligram Music; Dallas Records
- Producer: Aleksandar Milić - Mili

Lepa Brena chronology
Lepa Brena (The Best of – Dupli CD) (2003)	Uđi slobodno... (2008)	Začarani krug (2011)

Singles from Uđi slobodno...
- 1. "Pazi kome zavidiš" Released: July 19, 2008

Alternative cover
- Special edition cover

Uđi slobodno... is the fifteenth studio album by pop-folk singer Lepa Brena. It was released 28 June 2008 through the record label Grand Production, after an eight-year hiatus. Marina Tucaković is the sole lyricist of five songs on the album, while the lyrics of the remaining five songs were co-written with Ljiljana Jorgovanović. The sole composer and arranger (with the exception of the song "Dva asa") is Aleksandar Milić - Mili.

== Release ==
Brena first announced on 28 April 2008 that her fifteenth album would be titled Uđi slobodno... and released on 28 June 2008. The album's lead single, "Pazi kome zavidiš", was released on 19 July 2008, alongside a music video directed by Visual Infinity Production.

== Background ==
After a multiyear hiatus, in 2007 Lepa Brena agreed to collaborate with Aleksandar Milić - Mili and Marina Tucaković. The album appeared in stores in late June 2008. To mark the album's release, a documentary was broadcast on RTV Pink, with a record rating.

In parallel with promotional activities, Brena recorded the video for the song "Pazi kome zavidiš" in "Visual Infinity" production. For this recording they used the most modern HD cameras ever used in this region as well as advanced film lighting. The scene was filmed in the National Theater in Sombor and Novi Sad. Actors in the video included Aleksandar Jović, Staša Terzić, and Aleksandar Raonić. Brena's black-and-white dress was bought in London, and resembled the dress worn by Marilyn Monroe in the movie Bus Stop

In the Slovenian and Croatian markets, the album was released by Dallas Records.

The first printing was released in 250,000 CDs and 20,000 audio tapes, while the next printing was on 30,000 CDs.

== Promotion ==
On April 28, 2008 Brena announced a major comeback tour in the former Yugoslavia states.

== Track listing ==
No.	Title	Writer(s)	Producer(s)	Length
1.	"Uđi slobodno" (Enter Freely)	Marina Tucaković; Ljilja Jorgovanović	Aleksandar Milić - Mili	4:04
2.	"Pazi kome zavidiš" (Be Careful Who You Envy)	Marina Tucaković; Ljilja Jorgovanović	Aleksandar Milić - Mili	4:23
3.	"Kuća laži" (House of Lies)	Marina Tucaković; Ljilja Jorgovanović	Aleksandar Milić - Mili	3:29
4.	"Grad" (City)	Marina Tucaković; Ljilja Jorgovanović	Aleksandar Milić - Mili	4:03
5.	"Zašto" (Why)	Marina Tucaković	Aleksandar Milić - Mili	3:03
6.	"Kralj" (King)	Marina Tucaković	Aleksandar Milić - Mili	3:38
7.	"Sledeći" (Next)	Marina Tucaković	Aleksandar Milić - Mili	3:46
8.	"Dobra grešnica" (Good Sinner)	Marina Tucaković	Aleksandar Milić - Mili	3:28
9.	"Zrno tuge" (Grain of Sorrow)	Marina Tucaković; Ljilja Jorgovanović	Aleksandar Milić - Mili	3:12
10.	"Dva asa" (Pair of Aces)	Marina Tucaković	Sarit Hadad; Shay Reuveni	4:12
Total length:				37:25

Uđi slobodno... – Special edition
No.	Title	Writer(s)	Producer(s)	Length
11.	"Pazi kome Zavidis (KSL Club Instrumental)"	Marina Tucaković; Ljilja Jorgovanović	Aleksandar Milić - Mili
12.	"Udji slobodno (DJ Jukebox club mix)"	Marina Tucaković; Ljilja Jorgovanović	Aleksandar Milić - Mili
13.	"Pazi kome zavidis (DJ Device manager mix)"	Marina Tucaković; Ljilja Jorgovanović	Aleksandar Milić - Mili
14.	"Udji slobodno (DJ Vuk hard version)"	Marina Tucaković; Ljilja Jorgovanović	Aleksandar Milić - Mili
15.	"Pazi kome zavidis (Denny Dennasy club mix)"	Marina Tucaković; Ljilja Jorgovanović	Aleksandar Milić - Mili
16.	"Udji slobodno (Live)"	Marina Tucaković; Ljilja Jorgovanović	Aleksandar Milić - Mili

== Personnel ==
- Srđan Stojanović: Accordion
- Nenad Bojković Neša: Acoustic and electric guitars
- Ivan Milosavljević Milke: Acoustic and electric guitars, keyboard and drum programming
- Keyboards: Filip Miletić
- Bass: Mirko Kesić
- Bouzouki: Petar Trumpetaš
- Flute, Fife: Miroljub Jimmy Todorović
- Kaval: Spasoje Tufegdžić Spale
- Ivan Ilić Ilke: Trombone
- Đorđe Bilkić: Solo Violin
- Percussion – Zoran Čaušević Kiki
- Backing Vocals – Aleksandar Milić Mili, Ivana Selakov

== Production ==
- Produced by Aleksandar Milić Mili
- Recorded, mixed and edited by Ivan Milosavljevic Milke
- Post-production engineering by Boban Milunović
- Photography By – Edvard Nalbantjan, Miloš Nadaždin, Nebojša Babić

== Music videos ==
- Pazi kome zavidiš (video released February 2009)
- Uđi Slobodno (video filmed 25 December 2011; released 20 February 2012)

== Notes ==
- Recorded, programmed and mixed at Miligram Studios 2007/2008.
- Postproduced at studio "Fabrika 13", Ljubljana.
