= Hajde da se volimo (album) =

Hajde da se volimo Let's Fall in Love

Studio album by Lepa Brena
- Released: 24 October 1987
- Genre: Pop folk
- Label: Diskoton
- Producer: Kornelije Kovač; Miroljub Aranđelović; Zoran Radetić; Raka Đokić (executive producer)

Lepa Brena chronology
Uske pantalone (1986)	Hajde da se volimo Let's Fall in Love (1987)	Četiri godine (1989)

Hajde da se volimo (Let's Fall in Love) is the seventh studio album by Yugoslavian pop-folk singer Lepa Brena and her band Slatki Greh. It was released 24 October 1987 through the record label Diskoton.

This was her eighth of twelve albums with Slatki Greh and was the soundtrack for the film with the same name (released 20 November 1987). Scenes from the musical film were later used as music videos.

In 1988, Lepa Brena recorded an English version of the song "Hajde da se volimo" under the title "Let's Fall in Love".

The biggest hits on the album were songs "Hajde da se volimo", "Sanjam", "Udri, Mujo", "Učenici" and the ballad "Evo, zima će".

This album sold 850,000 copies.

== Track listing ==
No.	Title	Writer(s)	Length
1.	"Hajde da se volimo" (Let's Fall in Love)	Marina Tucaković
2.	"Golube" (Dove)	Marina Tucaković
3.	"Učenici" (Students)	Marina Tucaković
4.	"Evo, zima će" (Winter's Coming)	Marina Tucaković
5.	"Sanjam" (I'm Dreaming)	Marina Tucaković
6.	"On ne voli me" (He Doesn't Love Me)	Marina Tucaković
7.	"Zbog tebe" (Because of You)	Gojko Đević; Miroljub Aranđelović
8.	"Udri, Mujo" (Hit It, Mujo) (featuring Gidra)	Svetozar Baltić; Boris Mačešić
9.	"Rodiše me nežnu i sirotu" (I Was Born Gentle and Poor)	Dobrica Erić; Predrag Negovanović
10.	"Suze brišu sve" (Tears Wipe Away Everything)	Marina Tucaković

== Personnel ==
=== Production and recording ===
- Tahir Durkalić – engineering
- Vladimir Negovanović – engineering
- Zoran Radetić – engineering

=== Crew ===
- Nedim Bačvić – design
- Aleksandar Cvetinovski – photography
