= Hajde da se volimo (film series) =

Yugoslav film series (1987–1990)

- DVD cover
- Directed by: Aleksandar Đorđević (1); Stanko Crnobrnja (2-3)
- Written by: Jovan Marković (1-2); Radoslav Pavlović (3)
- Produced by: Milan Božić (1); Radoslav Raka Đokić (1-3); Milija Gane Đokić (2)
- Starring: Lepa Brena; Bata Živojinović; Dragomir "Gidra" Bojanić; Emir Hadžihafizbegović
- Cinematography: Predrag Popović (1); Miloš Spasojević (2-3)
- Edited by: Petar Marković (1-2); Milanka Nanović (3)
- Music by: Kornelije Kovač (1); Laza Ristovski (2-3)
- Release dates: 1987 (1); 1989 (2); 1990 (3)
- Running time: 87 mins. (1); 95 mins. (2); 92 mins. (3)
- Country: Yugoslavia
- Language: Serbo-Croatian

Hajde da se volimo (transl. Let's Fall in Love) is a Yugoslav musical comedy film series consisting of three feature-length films released between 1987 and 1990.

== Hajde da se volimo (1987) ==
Film release and plot

Hajde da se volimo was first released in Yugoslavia on Friday, 20 November 1987. It is a musical comedy starring Lepa Brena and her band Slatki Greh.

Soundtrack

The star of the film, Lepa Brena, sings the film's soundtrack of the same name Hajde da se volimo with her band Slatki Greh. The soundtrack album features ten original songs that were used throughout the film. The scenes in which the songs "Sanjam" (Dreaming), "Hajde da se volimo" (Let's Fall in Love), Udri, Mujo (Hit It, Mujo), "Učenici" (Students), "Golube" (Dove), "Suze brišu sve" (Tears Erase Everything) and "Zbog tebe" (Because of You) are played were used as their music videos. The film Hajde da se volimo begins with Brena singing "Evo, zima će" (Winter's Coming).

Apart from the soundtrack, Serbian composer Kornelije Kovač composed additional music throughout the film.

Filming locations

The movie was filmed across the former Yugoslavia, including:

- Dubrovnik, Croatia
- Užice, Serbia
- Kosjerić, Serbia
- Stari Most in Mostar, Bosnia and Herzegovina

Cast

- Lepa Brena - Lepa Brena
- Bata Živojinović - Komandir Milanović
- Dragomir "Gidra" Bojanić - Šofer Gile
- Mima Karadžić - Menadžer Svetislav
- Svetislav Goncić - Bale
- Miodrag Andrić - Milicioner Milivoje
- Kole Angelovski - Milicioner Gaga
- Milan Štrljić - Šef bande
- Boro Stjepanović - Komandirov pomoćnik
- Saša Popović - Saša
- Dušan Trifunčević - Dule
- Branislav Mijatović - Bane
- Ljubiša Marković - Ljubiša
- Živojin Matić - Žile
- Zoran Radanov - Zoki
- Danica Maksimović - Šefica recepcije
- Tatjana Pujin - Tanja
- Mihajlo Viktorović - Tanjin otac
- Mladen Nedeljković - Tanjin brat
- Radoslava Marinković - Službenica u hotelu
- Aleksandra Petković - Mlada seljanka
- Milan Srdoč - Čika Milija
- Predrag Milinković - Otmičar I
- Dragomir Stanojević - Otmičar II
- Žika Milenković - Poslovni tip I
- Nenad Ciganović - Poslovni tip II
- Božidar Pavičević-Longa - Poslovni tip III
- Bata Paskaljević - Upravnik hotela
- Zoran Stojiljković - Glavni gangster
- Đorđe Jovanović - Šef mesne zajednice
- Nikola Milić - Deda Vukašin
- Ratko Sarić - Deda Radovan
- Dragomir Čumić

Director

- Aleksandar Đorđević

Writer

- Jovan Marković

Executive producer

- Radoslav Raka Đokić

Producer

- Milan Božić

== Hajde da se volimo 2: Još jednom (1989) ==
VHS cassette tapes for film Hajde da se volimo 2 (1989)

Film release and plot

Hajde da se volimo 2 was released across Yugoslavia on Tuesday, 17 October 1989, nearly two years after the first film.

Filming locations

Some of the scenes in the movie were filmed on the island of Lopud, Croatia, which is one of the Elaphiti Islands.

Cast

Director

- Stanko Crnobrnja

Writer

- Jovan Marković

Executive producer

Milija Gane Đokić

Producer

- Radoslav Raka Đokić

== Hajde da se volimo 3: Udaje se Lepa Brena (1990) ==
VHS cassette tapes for film Hajde da se volimo 3 (1990)

Film release

Hajde da se volimo 3 was released across Yugoslavia on Monday, 19 November 1990.

Plot

The false story in the newspaper about the marriage of Lepa Brena to a wealthy Australian, they will try to take advantage of various types to check the news and to get a good salary and a bet that even some fairly well and get rich.

Filming locations

The movie was filmed mostly in the different parts of Serbia and Montenegro:

- Budva, Montenegro
- Žabljak, Montenegro
- Belgrade, Serbia
- Tara, a river in Montenegro
- Sveti Stefan, Montenegrin islet
- Crno jezero, Black Lake of Montenegro
- Kopaonik, mountain in Serbia
- Durmitor
- Tivat Airport, Montenegrin airport
- Vršac International Airport, Serbian airport

Cast

Director

- Stanko Crnobrnja

Writer

- Radoslav Pavlović

Executive producer

- Radoslav Raka Đokić

== Possible fourth film ==
The possibility of a fourth film has been thrown around for years.

Lepa Brena was quoted in January 2013 as saying about the fourth film: "To me it's all a matter of willpower to create a story called Let's Fall in Love, Part 4. I'm waiting to finish a lot of stuff to get started on that film. A movie costs between one million and two million to make. The funds should be provided, as well as good actors, a good script and good music. I can say for now I really have the desire to do it."
