= Vlado Kalember =

Croatian pop singer

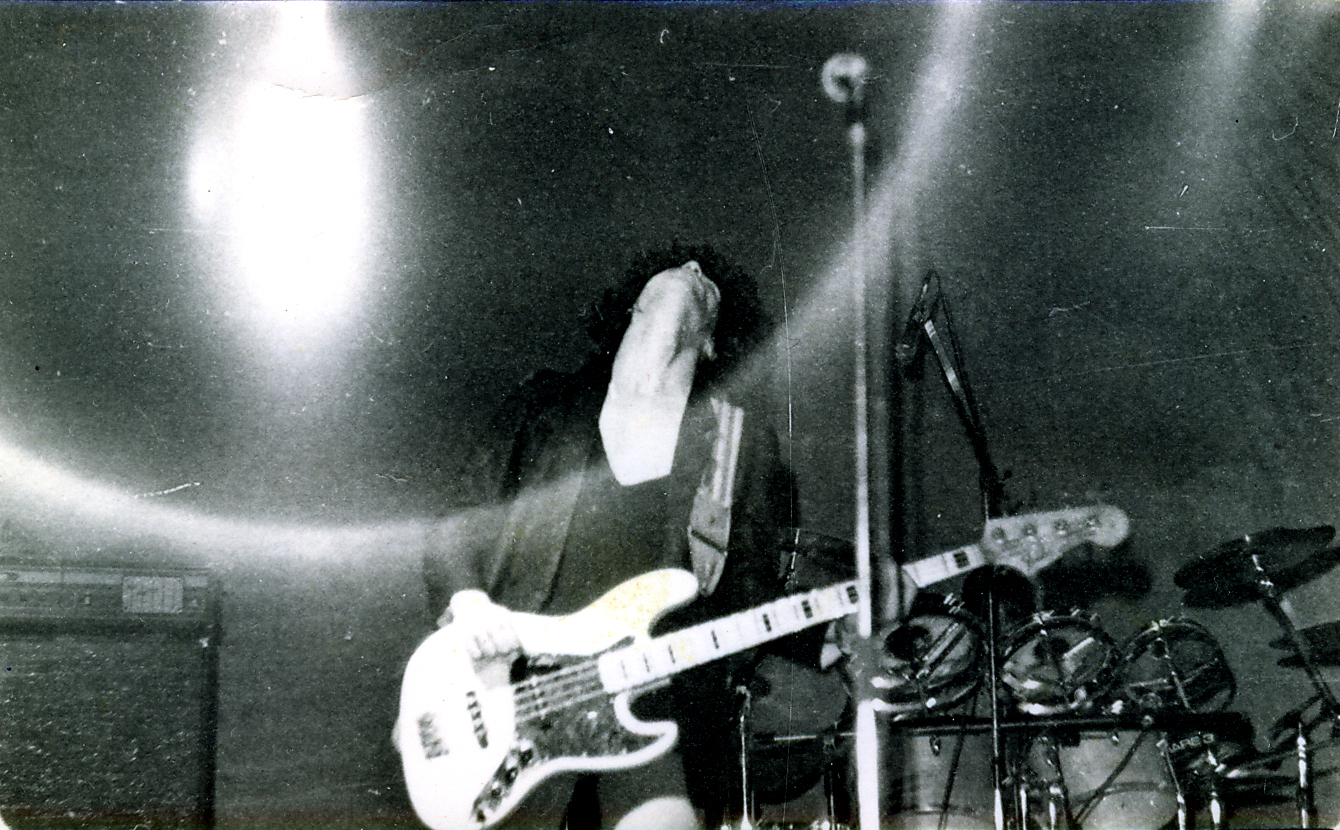
- Kalember performing live in Niš, 1980s
- Born: Vladimir Kalember; 26 April 1953 (age 73); Strumica, PR Macedonia, FPR Yugoslavia
- Other name: Vlado
- Occupation: Singer
- Years active: 1970s–present
- Spouse: Ana Rucner (m. 2006 - div. 2014)
- Children: 1

Vladimir "Vlado" Kalember (born 26 April 1953) is a Croatian pop singer, famous for his recognisable, husky voice.

In the 1970s, he was the vocalist of the popular pop band, Srebrna Krila. After leaving the band, he continued with a solo career. In 1984, together with Izolda Barudžija, he represented Yugoslavia at the Eurovision Song Contest. He was later a member of 4 Asa.

He was married to a young cello instrumentalist, Ana Rucner, and has a child with her. His famous songs are "Vino na usnama", "Ja nisam kockar", "Ana", "Lili", "Otkad si otišla", "Ja odavde, ona s juga", "Odoh u mornare", "Doris" and many other.

== See also ==
- Music of Croatia
- Srebrna Krila

| Preceded by Daniel | Yugoslavia in the Eurovision Song Contest; 1984 | Succeeded by Doris Dragović |
