= Daniel (Montenegrin singer) =

Montenegrin-Croatian pop singer

Daniel Popović Данијел Поповић
- Born: Danijel Popović; 29 October 1955 (age 70); Titograd, SR Montenegro, SFR Yugoslavia
- Origin: Yugoslavia
- Genres: Pop
- Occupation: Singer
- Instrument: Vocals
- Years active: 1977-Present

Milan "Danijel" Popović (Montenegrin Cyrillic: Милан "Данијел" Поповић; born 29 October 1955), better known simply as Daniel (Montenegrin Cyrillic: Даниел), is a Montenegrin-Croatian pop singer.

== Biography ==
Born to a Montenegrin father and a Belgian mother, Popović was raised in Titograd, but made his name in Zagreb, where he moved in 1977 to pursue a career in pop music.

In 1983, as a regional representative of Croatia (TV Zagreb), he won the right to represent Yugoslavia at the Eurovision Song Contest with the song "Džuli" ("Julie"). His national victory was somewhat unexpected because most observers saw popular folk singer Lepa Brena, a regional representative of Vojvodina (TV Novi Sad), as a clear favourite.

Daniel achieved 4th place in Munich, equaling at the time the best ever Yugoslav placing in the Eurovision Song Contest (Lola Novaković's 4th-place finish in 1962). "Džuli" was also a huge hit in Yugoslavia: the album sold 717,166 copies while the single sold a further 80,883. The song was a big hit in many other European countries as well, including Norway, where Daniel played several venues.

Like many other Eurovision contestants, Daniel failed to build on his triumph, and his commercial appeal gradually declined. By the 1990s, his popularity was already on the wane, though he managed to register one more moderate hit in 1991 – a track called "Daj obuci levisice" (Please Put On Levi's) that he competed with in Jugovizija 1991 representing Croatia (HTV) and placing second, only two points behind the winning song "Brazil" by Bebi Dol. A few years earlier, he had also featured in Lepa Brena's folk hit "Jugoslovenka" (Yugoslav Girl).

He stayed in Croatia during the Yugoslav Wars and disappeared into anonymity after a few unsuccessful albums. Tapping into his savings, he opened a studio and started producing records for performers like Nives Celzijus. Many artists had contacted Daniel for his services following the hit success of the song Good Boy by Minea performed on Croatian Eurovision in 1995, which Daniel composed. He would foray back into singing only occasionally. During the summer of 2001, he took part in the Sunčane Skale festival in Herceg Novi.

In early 2005, after an extended commercially barren period in Croatia, Daniel moved back to Montenegro, hoping to resurrect his stuttering singing career. In late 2005, his performance in Munich in 1983 was included in a collection of two double DVDs and two double CDs celebrating the 50th anniversary of the Eurovision Song Contest. The collection, which consisted of all the winners as well as a few of the most favourite non-winning contestants, was entitled Congratulations (1956-1980) and Congratulations (1981-2005).

In January 2007, it was reported that Daniel would take part in the Croatian pre-selection for the Eurovision Song Contest, Dora, together with his son Sebastian (20) and daughter Isabella (16), as well as Snježana Ivana Pandl (17). Their song did not make it to the final selection process. In late 2009, he was a contestant on Kmetija reality show, Slovenian version of The Farm.

== Personal life ==
Daniel has been married 4 times. He wed his first wife Marija in 1978; the couple were divorced by the mid-1980s, when, in 1986, he married a Macedonian Maja and both had baby Ana Marija, then he married Sanja Bjedov and had two children with her: son Sebastian, and daughter Isabella Kim. The couple separated in 1994 before finalizing their divorce in 1996.

By that time Daniel was in a relationship with Sandra Petrž whom he soon married and had a son Dominik with. Soon after moving from Zagreb to Podgorica in early 2005, the couple separated and divorced. In August 2005, he was hit with public allegations of spousal abuse by his ex-wife Sandra Petrž who accused him of "repeated, jealousy-induced physical and mental maltreatment".

In March 2008, news appeared in certain media outlets about the possibility that Daniel might end up serving time in prison for not paying child and spousal support to his second wife, Sanja Bjedov, and their two children. In spring 2008, a Croatian court ordered him to pay HRK219,000 (~€31,000) in back spousal and child support payments. In October 2009, during a club appearance in Zagreb his ex-wife Sandra brought their son Dominik along and claimed Daniel owes them €2,000 in unpaid child support.

== Discography ==
Studio albums

- Bio sam naivan (1982)
- Suze i smijeh (1984)
- Daniel (1984) (reissued as Lovin' That Rock n' Roll in 1985)
- Tina i Marina (1985)
- Dušu je moju uzela (1986)
- Slomljeno srce (1987)
- Što sam ti srećo kriv (1989)
- Ma daj, obuci levisice (1991)
- Danceland (1994)
- Kao da ne postojim (1999)
- Vatra ljubavi (1999)
- Fantazija (2013)

Compilation albums

- 18 zlatnih hitova (1983–1993) (1993)
- The Platinum Collection (2007)
- The Best Of Collection (2020)

| Preceded by Aska | Yugoslavia in the Eurovision Song Contest; 1983 | Succeeded by Vlado Kalember & Izolda Barudžija |
