= Zar je važno da l' se peva ili pjeva... World Tour =

2017–22 concert tour by Lepa Brena

- World tour by Lepa Brena
- Promotional poster for concert in Belgrade at Štark Arena, October 2018
- Associated album: Zar je važno dal se peva ili pjeva
- Start date: November 11, 2017
- End date: October 28, 2022
- Legs: 4
- No. of shows: 82 in Europe; 9 in North America; 4 in Australia; 95 total

Lepa Brena concert chronology
- Začarani krug Tour (2011–17); Zar je važno da l' se peva ili pjeva... World Tour (2017–22); Imam pesmu da vam pevam Tour (2024)

Zar je važno da l' se peva ili pjeva... World Tour was the fifth headlining concert tour by Serbian singer Lepa Brena, in support of her eighteenth studio album, Zar je važno dal se peva ili pjeva (2018). The tour began on 11 November 2017, in Vienna, Austria, at the Lugner City and concluded on 28 October 2022, in Cleveland, United States, at Astor Theatre. The tour was also included some festival concerts.

== Background ==
On October 24, 2017, Brenna's discography house Grand, of which she and co-owner, announced that Brena is on a world tour Zar je važno da l' se peva ili pjeva? and will be sponsored by NetTV Plus. On October 27, 2017, Brena held a press conference in Sofia, Bulgaria to promote a concert in Sofia on March 23, 2018, and announced her great world tour. She also appeared as a guest in a Big Brother, on Nova television where competitors competed who would better imitate Brena and sing like her. On January 17, 2018, Brena announced the first concert in Serbia on the occasion of the new world tour.

On March 3, 2018, the North America leg was announced.

On March 5, 2018, Brena announced a big Belgrade concert at the Štark Arena in the "Morning with Jovana and Srdjan" on the Prva Srpska Televizija. The tickets for the concert were released for sale on June 20, 2018. After a sold-out concert scheduled for October 20 at the Štark Arena, due to great interest for the spectacle of the year, the Lepa Brena team decided to make another Arena, the next day, on the October 21, 2018. Tickets for the second concert were immediately released for sale, and

On May 12, 2018, Brena announced 4 new dates for Banja Luka, Budva, Velika Kladuša and Svrljig.

On September 27, 2018, the Australia leg was announced.

After the Australian part of the tour, Brena announced a break because she wants to be in Serbia when her stepson Filip and daughter-in-law Aleksandra get a baby.

On March 17, 2020, Brena announced the postponement of all her business obligations and concerts due to the COVID-19 pandemic.

== Set list ==
This setlist was obtained from the concert of October 20, 2018 held at Štark Arena in Belgrade. It does not represent all shows throughout the tour.

1. "Boliš i ne prolaziš"
2. "Srećna žena"
3. "Kao nova"
4. "Tako si juče"
5. "Bolje ne"
6. "Sve smo mi krive" / "Kad jedno voli za oboje"
7. "Uđi slobodno" / "Grad"
8. "Beli biseru" / "Recite mu da ga volim"
9. "Mače moje" / "Dva dana"
10. "Sigurno" / "Sledeći"
11. "Zar je važno da l' se peva ili pjeva"
12. "Jugoslovenka"
13. "Luda za tobom" / "Ti si moj greh" / "Robinja" / "Kuća laži"
14. "Čik pogodi"
15. "Šeik"
16. "Carica" / "Udri, Mujo"
17. "Zašto"
18. "Sve mi dobro ide osim ljubavi"
19. "Imam pesmu da vam pevam"
20. "Čačak, Čačak"
21. "Duge noge"
22. "Mile voli disko" / "Sitnije, Cile, sitnije" / "Dama iz Londona"
23. "Bato, Bato" / "Miki, Mićo"
24. "Janoš"
25. "Čuvala me mama" / "Momci na vidiku" / "Boli me uvo za sve"
26. "Sanjam"
27. "Hajde da se volimo"
28. "Pazi kome zavidiš"
29. "Četiri godine" / "Golube" / "Evo, zima će"
30. "Jablane" / "A kako ću ja"
31. "Ja nemam drugi dom"
32. "Poželi sreću drugima"
Notes
- During the first show in Belgrade at Štark Arena, between songs "Jugoslovenka" and "Luda za tobom", Andrija Milošević and Anđelka Prpić appeared on the stage with the intention to play how they met Lepa Brena i Slobodan Živojinović.

== Shows ==
List of concerts, showing date, city, country, venue, opening acts, tickets sold, number of available tickets and amount of gross revenue
Date	City	Country	Venue	Opening acts / guest	Attendance
Europe – Leg 1
November 11, 2017	Vienna	Austria	Lugner City	Stefan Živojinović	4,000
November 24, 2017	Ljungby	Sweden	Garvaren Nöje	Haris Berković	3,000
December 24, 2017	Ljubljana	Slovenia	Gospodarsko razstavišče	Stefan Živojinović	5,000
December 31, 2017	Petrovac	Montenegro	Hotel "Palas"	Magazin	1,100
February 10, 2018	Hamburg	Germany	Edelfettwerk	—N/a	2,500
March 8, 2018	Subotica	Serbia	Sports Hall	—N/a	5,000
March 17, 2018	Offenbach	Germany	Club Sunset at Night	—N/a	2,000
March 23, 2018	Sofia	Bulgaria	Arena Armeec	Stefan Živojinović	15,000
North America – Leg 2
March 30, 2018	New York City	United States	Melrose Ballroom	Stefan Živojinović	3,000
March 31, 2018	Chicago	United States	Joe's Live Rosemont	Stefan Živojinović	4,200
April 7, 2018	St. Louis	United States	Grbic Banquet Hall	Stefan Živojinović	2,000
April 13, 2018	Toronto	Canada	Rebel	Stefan Živojinović	3,700
April 14, 2018	Detroit	United States	Macedonian Cultural Center	Stefan Živojinović	2,000
April 18, 2018	Miami	United States	El Tucan	Stefan Živojinović	2,500
April 20, 2018	Jacksonville	United States	Morocco Shrine Auditorium	Stefan Živojinović	2,000
April 21, 2018	New Jersey	United States	Macedonian Cultural Center	Stefan Živojinović	2,000
April 22, 2018	Washington, D.C.	United States	Bravo Bravo	Stefan Živojinović	1,700
Europe – Leg 3
July 7, 2018 (Note: The show on July 7, 2018, in Jagodina at JASSA Sports Center is part of the Kick boxing spectacle)	Jagodina	Serbia	JASSA Sports Center (Note: The show was previously planned in Končarevo at Football Stadium but the concert was moved because of the rain)	—N/a	6,500
July 14, 2018 (Note: The show on July 14, 2018, in Banja Luka at Kastel Fortress is part of the Vikend fest)	Banja Luka	Bosnia and Herzegovina	Kastel Fortress	—N/a	10,000
July 21, 2018	Poreč	Croatia	Palazzo Club	—N/a	3,000
July 29, 2018	Budva	Montenegro	Top Hill	—N/a	5,000
August 3, 2018	Velika Kladuša	Bosnia and Herzegovina	Sports center MIDž – HIT	DJ Blizanci	5,000
August 5, 2018 (Note: The show on August 5, 2018, in Svrljig at Town Square is part of the Belmužijada)	Svrljig	Serbia	Sports fields	—N/a	60,000
August 18, 2018 (Note: The show on August 18, 2018, in Strumica at Town Square is part of the Open Fest)	Strumica	North Macedonia	Town Square	Victory Band; Libero Band; Marija Šerifović	80,000
September 22, 2018 (Note: The show on September 22, 2018, in Kikinda at Town Square is part of the Dani ludaje)	Kikinda	Serbia	Town Square	Dragica Radosavljević Cakana	40,000
September 23, 2018 (Note: The show on September 23, 2018, in Aleksandrovac at Vinski trg is part of the Župska berba)	Aleksandrovac	Serbia	Vinski trg	—N/a	20,000
October 5, 2018	Munich	Germany	Zenith Halle	Stefan Živojinović; Haris Džinović; Mile Kitić	5,500
October 20, 2018	Belgrade	Serbia	Štark Arena	—N/a	44,000
October 21, 2018	Belgrade	Serbia	Štark Arena	—N/a	44,000
November 2, 2018	Vienna	Austria	Club Tresor	Đani	2,000
November 10, 2018	Düsseldorf	Germany	KÖ Club	—N/a	2,000
December 8, 2018	Pforzheim	Germany	Flash Club	DJ PD	2,000
December 15, 2018	Skopje	North Macedonia	VIP Arena Boris Trajkovski	—N/a	12,000
December 29, 2018	Jahorina	Bosnia and Herzegovina	Olympic Center	—N/a	5,000
January 1, 2019	Tivat	Montenegro	Riva Pine	Bojan Delić	35,000
Australia – Leg 4
January 18, 2019	Perth	Australia	Astor Theatre	Stefan Živojinović	1,050
January 19, 2019	Melbourne	Australia	Forum Theatre	Stefan Živojinović	2,000
January 25, 2019	Brisbane	Australia	The Tivoli	Stefan Živojinović	1,500
January 26, 2019	Sydney	Australia	Enmore Theatre	Stefan Živojinović	2,500
Europe – Leg 5
March 16, 2019 (Note: The show on March 16, 2019, in Kopaonik at Grand Hotel & Spa is part of the Music Week 2019.)	Kopaonik	Serbia	Grand Hotel & Spa	Dženan Lončarević	3,000
April 5, 2019	Timișoara	Romania	Club Heaven	—N/a	2,800
May 10, 2019	Wels	Austria	Trabrennbahn Rosenau	—N/a	2,000
June 22, 2019 (Note: The show on June 22, 2019, in Novi Sad at Petrovaradin Fortress is part of the Tamburica fest)	Novi Sad	Serbia	Petrovaradin Fortress	—N/a	10,000
June 29, 2019	Kruševac	Serbia	Slobodište	—N/a	20,000
July 6, 2019	Banja Luka	Bosnia and Herzegovina	Trg Krajine	DJ Kazo	35,000
July 11, 2019	Vrnjačka Banja	Serbia	Vrnjački karneval	—N/a	30,000
July 19, 2019	Bajina Bašta	Serbia	Drina Regatta	—N/a	20,000
August 4, 2019	Budva	Montenegro	Top Hill	—N/a	5,000
August 16, 2019	Trebinje	Bosnia and Herzegovina	Grad Sunca - Aqua & Dino Park	—N/a	10,000
August 23, 2019 (Note: The show on August 23, 2019, in Vranje at Trg Republike is part of the Dani Vranja 2019.)	Vranje	Serbia	Trg Republike	—N/a	20,000
August 24, 2019 (Note: The show on August 24, 2019, in Belgrade at Ušće is part of the Music Week 2019.)	Belgrade	Serbia	Ušće	Hari Mata Hari; Nina Badrić; Aca Lukas; Darko Lazić	100,000
August 26, 2019	Leskovac	Serbia	Leskovac Grill Festival	Grupa "Valter"; Tanja Ivanović; Stefan Živojinović	100,000
August 28, 2019 (Note: The show on August 28, 2019, in Vidin at Baba Vida Fortress is part of the Vidinski panair)	Vidin	Bulgaria	Baba Vida	—N/a	20,000
August 30, 2019 (Note: The show on August 30, 2019, in Zrenjanin at Trg slobode is part of the Dani piva)	Zrenjanin	Serbia	Trg slobode	—N/a	40,000
August 31, 2019 (Note: The show on August 31, 2019, in Požarevac at Hippodrome Požarevac is part of the 56. Ljubičevske konjičke igre.)	Požarevac	Serbia	Trg Oslobođenja	—N/a	35,000
September 21, 2019	Dimitrovgrad	Serbia	STC Caribrod	—N/a	5,000
October 4, 2019	Innsbruck	Austria	Music Hall	—N/a	3,000
October 12, 2019	Paris	France	Club Haussmann	—N/a	2,500
November 2, 2019	Pforzheim	Germany	Flash Club	—N/a	2,000
November 10, 2019	Kumanovo	North Macedonia	Town square	—N/a	15,000
November 12, 2019	Sremska Mitrovica	Serbia	Trg Ćire Milekića	—N/a	20,000
November 30, 2019	Stockholm	Sweden	Subtopia Hangaren	—N/a	3,000
December 14, 2019	Zagreb	Croatia	Arena Zagreb	Stefan Živojinović	40,000
December 15, 2019	Zagreb	Croatia	Arena Zagreb	Stefan Živojinović	40,000
December 31, 2019	Belgrade	Serbia	Square in front of the National Assembly of Serbia	Maya Berović	90,000
February 1, 2020	Helsingborg	Sweden	Sundspärlan	Rasta; Alexandra Matrix	3,500
February 14, 2020	Herceg Novi	Montenegro	Mimosa holiday	—N/a	10,000
June 26, 2021	Kozloduy	Bulgaria	Park Hristo Botev	Gloria	10,000
July 17, 2021	Crvenka	Serbia	Slatki dani u srcu Bačke	—N/a	10,000
August 1, 2021	Bitola	North Macedonia	Gold felicia	—N/a	5,000
August 7, 2021	Kladovo	Serbia	Fetislam	—N/a	10,000
August 13, 2021	Budva	Montenegro	Top Hill	—N/a	5,000
September 1, 2021	Podgorica	Montenegro	Imanje Knjaz	—N/a	2,000
September 8, 2021	Belgrade	Serbia	Nacionalna klasa	—N/a	2,000
December 31, 2021	Kopaonik	Serbia	Grand Hotel & Spa	—N/a	3,000
February 24, 2022	Belgrade	Serbia	Kasina by Community	—N/a	2,000
March 5, 2022	Vienna	Austria	Pyramide Vösendorf	Saša Kovačević; Alexandra Mladenović	5,000
March 8, 2022	Laktaši	Bosnia and Herzegovina	Salon Krin	—N/a	1,000
March 13, 2022	Odžaci	Serbia	Town square	—N/a	10,000
May 7, 2022	Pforzheim	Germany	Flash Club	—N/a	2,000
May 14, 2022	Jahorina	Bosnia and Herzegovina	Hotel Vučko	—N/a	1,000
May 28, 2022	Düsseldorf	Germany	KÖ Club	—N/a	2,000
June 4, 2022	Stockholm	Sweden	Stockholm Feste	—N/a	2,500
June 8, 2022	Zagreb	Croatia	Extra Mint	—N/a	5,000
June 9, 2022	Zagreb	Croatia	Extra Mint	—N/a	5,000
June 25, 2022	Vevčani	North Macedonia	Via Ignatia	—N/a	200
July 2, 2022	Koper	Slovenia	Music park Dekani - Bivje	Milica Todorović	8,000
July 8, 2022	Ljubovija	Serbia	Stadion FK Drina	—N/a	10,000
July 17, 2022	Berzasca	Romania	Balkan Fest	Dejan Petrović	8,000
July 26, 2022	Berane	Montenegro	Hotel Berane	—N/a	2,000
July 30, 2022	Banja Luka	Bosnia and Herzegovina	Kastel Fortress	—N/a	12,000
August 2, 2022	Zvornik	Bosnia and Herzegovina	Zvorničko ljeto	—N/a	15.000
August 5, 2022	Istočno Novo Sarajevo	Bosnia and Herzegovina	Trg Republike Srbije	—N/a	15,000
August 9, 2022	Budva	Montenegro	Top Hill	—N/a	5,000
September 3, 2022	Novi Sad	Serbia	Cristal splav	—N/a	2,000
September 7, 2022	Belgrade	Serbia	Nacionalna klasa	—N/a	1,000
September 21, 2022	Sofia	Bulgaria	Event Center - Serdika	1,500	
September 24, 2022	Linz	Austria	Imperial Club	1,000	
North America – Leg 6
October 7, 2022	Chicago	North America	Astor Theatre	Aleksandar Josifovski; Enela Palavra	1,050
October 8, 2022	Atlanta	North America	Astor Theatre	Aleksandar Josifovski; Enela Palavra	1,050
October 14, 2022	Detroit	North America	MCC Banquet	Aleksandar Josifovski; Enela Palavra	2,000
October 15, 2022	Waterloo	North America	Astor Theatre	Aleksandar Josifovski; Enela Palavra	1,050
October 21, 2022	St. Louis	North America	Astor Theatre	Aleksandar Josifovski; Enela Palavra	1,050
October 22, 2022	New Jersey	North America	Macedonian Cultural Center	Aleksandar Josifovski; Enela Palavra	1,750
October 23, 2022	Washington, D.C.	North America	Astor Theatre	Aleksandar Josifovski; Enela Palavra	1,050
October 28, 2022	Cleveland	North America	Astor Theatre	Aleksandar Josifovski; Enela Palavra	1,050
Total					1,222,800

== Cancelled shows ==
List of cancelled concerts, showing date, city, country, venue and reason for cancellation
Date	City	Country	Venue	Reason
August 14, 2018	Jelah	Bosnia and Herzegovina	Ciglansko jezero	Storm
August 17, 2018	Novi Pazar	Serbia	Letnja bašta HR Music	Storm
July 4, 2020	Koper	Slovenia	Music park Dekani - Bivje	COVID-19 pandemic
