= 2010–11 Bosnia and Herzegovina Hockey League season =

2010–11 BHL season
- League: Bosnia and Herzegovina Hockey League
- Sport: Ice hockey
- Duration: January 7 – March 26, 2011
- Number of teams: 4
- Regular-season winner: HK Bosna
- Finals champions: HK Bosna
- Runners-up: HK Alfa

Bosnia and Herzegovina Hockey League seasons
- ← 2009–10 2011–12 →

The 2010–11 Bosnia and Herzegovina Hockey League was the 3rd season of the Bosnia and Herzegovina Hockey League (BHL). It ran from January 7, 2011 until March 26, 2011, with the playoffs following on March 25 to March 26. HK Bosna won their second title after defeating HK Alfa 2–0 in the best of three playoff series.

== League business ==
For the 2010–11 season all games will be played at the Olympic Hall Zetra. The league employs modified rules. Games last for 45 minutes without a stopping clock, and contact in play and slapshots are not allowed. The maximum players that a team can have on their list in 15. The season opened with the three teams returning from the previous season with each team to play ten games before the top two teams enter the playoffs. During mid-January a fourth team, HK Ilidža 2010, joined the league, resulting in a revised schedule. The season was expanded with each team playing 15 games before the playoffs.

Following on from the previous season the three teams continued to play under their nicknames. HK Bosna plays under the name Lisice sa Općine Centar, HK Alfa plays under the name Medvjedi iz Novog Sarajeva, and HK Stari Grad plays under the name Vukovi sa Starog Grada. HK Ilidža 2010 will play under their original name.

During the 2010–11 season the teams will also compete in the Jaroslav Jandourek Cup, the national cup which is named after the former coach of HK Bosna coach Jaroslav Jandourek. Three games will be held from March 16 to March 23. HK Alfa was drawn against HK Ilidža 2010 while HK Bosna was drawn against HK Stari Grad. The winners of the two games advance to the final. HK Ilidža 2010 went on to win the Cup after defeating HK Bosna 2–1 in the final.

== Regular season ==
The regular season consisted of each team playing 15 games, with five games against each other team. Following the completion of regular season the top two teams in the standings progress to a three game playoff series. HK Bosna secured first place in the standings after beating HK Ilidža 2010 2 – 1 in their final game. HK Alfa finished in second place to advance to the playoffs after beating HK Stari Grad 4 – 3 with the final goal coming from a shootout. HK Alfa finished a point ahead of HK Stari Grad causing HK Stari Grad to be unable to defend last seasons title.

=== Standings ===
Qualified for the playoffs

Team	GP	W	OTW	OTL	L	GF	GA	GDF	PTS
HK Bosna	15	8	2	0	5	40	39	+1	28
HK Alfa	15	7	2	1	5	53	51	+2	26
HK Stari Grad	15	7	0	2	6	46	48	-2	23
HK Ilidža 2010	15	4	0	1	10	45	46	-1	13

=== January ===
January 7, 2011; 22:15	HK Bosna	2 – 3 (1–1, 0–1, 0–1)	HK Stari Grad

Game reference

January 11, 2011; 22:15	HK Alfa	6 – 2 (2–0, 1–2, 3–0)	HK Stari Grad

Game reference

January 14, 2011; 22:15	HK Bosna	2 – 4 (0–0, 2–2, 0–2)	HK Alfa

Game reference

January 18, 2011	HK Stari Grad	5 – 4 (0–1, 1–2, 4–2)	HK Ilidža 2010

Game reference

January 21, 2011; 22:15	HK Alfa	5 – 3 (2–0, 1–1, 2–2)	HK Ilidža 2010

Game reference

January 22, 2011; 16:00	HK Ilidža 2010	2 – 3 (1–1, 0–1, 1–1)	HK Bosna

Game reference

January 25, 2011; 22:15	HK Stari Grad	3 – 4 (SO) (1–0, 2–2, 0–1, 0–1)	HK Alfa

Game reference

=== February ===
February 1, 2011; 22:15	HK Bosna	2 – 1 (1–0, 1–0, 0–1)	HK Stari Grad

Game reference

February 4, 2011; 22:15	HK Bosna	4 – 3 (SO) (1–0, 1–1, 1–2, 1–0)	HK Ilidža 2010

Game reference

February 5, 2011; 16:00	HK Alfa	3 – 1 (0–1, 3–0, 0–0)	HK Stari Grad

Game reference

February 6, 2011; 19:00	HK Bosna	2 – 1 (1–0, 1–1, 0–0)	HK Ilidža 2010

Game reference

February 8, 2011; 22:15	HK Bosna	6 – 5 (SO) (0–2, 3–3, 2–0, 1–0)	HK Alfa

Game reference

February 11, 2011; 22:15	HK Stari Grad	4 – 2 (1–1, 1–1, 2–0)	HK Ilidža 2010

Game reference

February 12, 2011; 19:00	HK Stari Grad	1 – 2 (0–1, 0–0, 1–1)	HK Bosna

Game reference

February 13, 2011; 18:55	HK Ilidža 2010	6 – 1 (3–0, 1–0, 2–1)	HK Alfa

Game reference

February 15, 2011; 22:15	HK Ilidža 2010	3 – 4 (1–2, 2–2, 0–0)	HK Alfa

Game reference

February 16, 2011; 22:15	HK Stari Grad	4 – 5 (1–3, 2–1, 1–1)	HK Alfa

Game reference

February 18, 2011; 22:15	HK Alfa	1 – 4 (0–0, 0–2, 1–2)	HK Bosna

Game reference

February 21, 2011; 18:55	HK Ilidža 2010	2 – 3 (1–1, 1–1, 0–1)	HK Stari Grad

Game reference

February 22, 2011; 22:15	HK Ilidža 2010	5 – 3 (0–0, 2–0, 3–3)	HK Stari Grad

Game reference

February 26, 2011; 16:00	HK Alfa	5 – 4 (2–2, 2–2, 1–0)	HK Ilidža 2010

Game reference

February 27, 2011; 18:55	HK Alfa	1 – 2 (0–0, 1–0, 0–2)	HK Bosna

Game reference

=== March ===
March 1, 2011; 22:15	HK Ilidža 2010	3 – 0 (1–0, 0–0, 2–0)	HK Bosna

Game reference

March 4, 2011; 22:15	HK Bosna	4 – 3 (1–0, 2–1, 1–2)	HK Alfa

Game reference

March 5, 2011; 16:00	HK Stari Grad	3 – 2 (2–1, 0–1, 1–0)	HK Ilidža 2010

Game reference

March 8, 2011; 22:15	HK Stari Grad	7 – 4 (3–1, 1–2, 3–1)	HK Bosna

Game reference

March 10, 2011; 18:55	HK Bosna	1 – 3 (1–0, 0–1, 0–2)	HK Stari Grad

Game reference

March 11, 2011; 22:15	HK Ilidža 2010	4 – 2 (2–1, 1–1, 1–0)	HK Alfa

Game reference

March 14, 2011; 19:00	HK Bosna	2 – 1 (0–1, 1–0, 1–0)	HK Ilidža 2010

Game reference

March 16, 2011; 22:15	HK Alfa	4 – 3 (SO) (1–1, 2–2, 0–0, 1–0)	HK Stari Grad

Game reference

== Playoffs ==
HK Bosna and HK Alfa qualified for the playoffs after finishing first and second in the regular season standings respectively. HK Bosna won the best of three championship series in two games.

March 25, 2011; 18:00	HK Bosna	4 – 3 (OT) (3–1, 0–0, 0–2, 1–0)	HK Alfa

Game reference

March 26, 2011; 18:00	HK Alfa	2 – 5 (1–2, 0–2, 1–1)	HK Bosna

Game reference
