= 2012–13 Bosnia and Herzegovina Hockey League season =

2012–13 BHHL season
- League: Bosnia and Herzegovina Hockey League
- Sport: Ice hockey
- Number of teams: 4
- Regular season winner: HK Stari Grad
- Finals champions: HK Stari Grad
- Runners-up: HK Alfa Novo Sarajevo

Bosnia and Herzegovina Hockey League seasons
- ← 2011–12 2013–14 →

The 2012–13 Bosnia and Herzegovina Hockey League season was the fifth season of the Bosnia and Herzegovina Hockey League (BHHL). Four teams participated in the league, and HK Stari Grad won the championship.

== Regular season ==
	Club	GP	W	OTW	OTL	L	Goals	Pts
1.	HK Stari Grad	9	5	1	1	2	30:9	18
2.	HK Alfa Novo Sarajevo	9	5	1	0	3	26:20	17
3.	HK Ilidža 2010	9	5	0	1	3	25:26	16
4.	HK Bosna	9	1	0	0	8	16:42	3

== Final ==
Teams			Series	1	2	3
HK Stari Grad	-	HK Alfa Novo Sarajevo	2:0	3:1 (0:0, 2:1, 1:0)	2:1 SO (0:0, 1:1, 0:0, 1:0)	–
