= Aleksandra Prijović discography =

- Prijović performing at Top Hill, 2023
- Studio albums: 4
- Singles: 18
- Music videos: 44
- Promotional singles: 2

Serbian singer Aleksandra Prijović has released four studio albums, 18 singles (including one as a featured artist), two promotional singles and 44 music videos.

== Albums ==
=== Studio albums ===
List of studio albums, showing release date, label and chart positions
Title	Details	Peak chart positions		Notes
Title	Details	AUT	SWI	Notes
Testament	Released: 25 July 2017; Label: Grand Production; Format: CD, digital download, streaming	—	—	Track listing: | No. | Title | Length | |---|---|---| | 1. | "Testament" | 4:17 | | 2. | "Telo" | 3:25 | | 3. | "Sledeća" | 3:52 | | 4. | "Klizav pod" | 3:58 | | 5. | "Separe" | 3:11 | | 6. | "Mesto zločina" | 3:22 | | 7. | "Voljena greško" | 3:32 | | Total length: | | 25:37 | Physical edition bonus tracks | No. | Title | Length | |---|---|---| | 8. | "Litar vina, litar krvi" (with Aco Pejović featuring Dejan Petrović) | 3:41 | | 9. | "Senke" | 3:30 | | 10. | "Totalna anestezija" | 3:46 | | 11. | "Za nas kasno je" | 3:23 | | Total length: | | 39:57 |
Zvuk tišine	Released: 21 July 2022; Label: A Music; Format: Digital download, streaming	—	—	Track listing: | No. | Title | Length | |---|---|---| | 1. | "Zvuk tišine" | 4:03 | | 2. | "Sabotiram" | 3:07 | | 3. | "Ja sam odlično" | 2:51 | | 4. | "Ogavno" | 3:33 | | 5. | "Javno mesto" | 3:17 | | 6. | "Marš" | 4:11 | | 7. | "Svetlo" | 3:21 | | Total length: | | 24:23 | Bonus tracks | No. | Title | Length | |---|---|---| | 8. | "Duguješ mi dva života" | 3:47 | | 9. | "Neponovljivo" | 3:05 | | 10. | "Dođi sebi" (with Lexington) | 4:01 | | 11. | "Legitimno" | 3:19 | | 12. | "Bogata sirotinja" | 3:42 | | 13. | "Sačuvaj tajnu" | 5:49 | | Total length: | | 48:06 |
Devet života	Released: 26 June 2023; Label: A Music; Format: Digital download, streaming	31	59	Track listing: | No. | Title | Length | |---|---|---| | 1. | "Devet života" | 4:07 | | 2. | "Dam dam dam" | 2:44 | | 3. | "Placebo" | 3:19 | | 4. | "Psiho" | 3:17 | | 5. | "Kuća strave" | 3:34 | | 6. | "Prvi si počeo" | 2:45 | | 7. | "Ludnica" (featuring Dejan Kostić) | 4:38 | | 8. | "Zver" | 2:40 | | 9. | "Sve po starom" | 3:50 | | Total length: | | 30:54 |
Bol i alkohol	Released: 18 June 2026; Label: A Music; Format: Digital download, streaming	14	21	Track listing: | No. | Title | Length | |---|---|---| | 1. | "Rugoba" | 3:05 | | 2. | "Halo" | 3:30 | | 3. | "Kababa" | 3:27 | | 4. | "Olovo" | 4:25 | | 5. | "Gatara" | 2:57 | | 6. | "Macho Man" (featuring Dejan Petrović) | 3:28 | | 7. | "Konobari" | 4:27 | | 8. | "Opa cupa" | 3:18 | | 9. | "Vreme prolazi" | 3:57 | | Total length: | | 32:34 |
"—" denotes a recording that did not chart.

== Singles ==
=== As lead artist ===
List of singles as lead artist, showing year released, chart positions, certifications and album name
Title	Year	Peak chart positions	Album
Title	Year	CRO Billb.	Album
"Litar vina, litar krvi" (Note: Included on physical edition of Testament only) (with Aco Pejović featuring Dejan Petrović)	2017	(Note: Croatia Songs was launched on 15 February 2022.)	Testament
"Uspomene"	2017	(Note: Croatia Songs was launched on 15 February 2022.)	Non-album singles
"Ko si ti" (with Saša Matić)	2018	(Note: Croatia Songs was launched on 15 February 2022.)	Non-album singles
"Neponovljivo" (as Aleksandra)	2019	(Note: Croatia Songs was launched on 15 February 2022.)	Zvuk tišine
"Bogata sirotinja"	2019	(Note: Croatia Songs was launched on 15 February 2022.)	Zvuk tišine
"Duguješ mi dva života"	2020	(Note: Croatia Songs was launched on 15 February 2022.)	Zvuk tišine
"Legitimno"	2020	23	Zvuk tišine
"Dođi sebi" (with Lexington)	2021		Zvuk tišine
"Zvuk tišine"	2022	—	Zvuk tišine
"Sabotiram"	2022	10	Zvuk tišine
"Svetlo"	2022	—	Zvuk tišine
"Ogavno"	2022	—	Zvuk tišine
"Javno mesto"	2022	22	Zvuk tišine
"Marš"	2022	12	Zvuk tišine
"Ja sam odlično"	2022	7	Zvuk tišine
"Kuća strave"	2023	21	Devet života
"Poslednji kabare"	2024	—	Non-album single
"—" denotes a recording that did not chart.

=== As featured artist ===
List of singles as featured artist, showing year released, chart positions, certifications and album name
Title	Year	Album
"Šta bi" (MC Stojan featuring Aleksandra Prijović)	2015	Najveći folk hitovi

=== Promotional singles ===
List of promotional singles, showing year released, chart positions and album name
Title	Year	Album
"Sačuvaj tajnu" (Live Performance)	2021	Zvuk tišine
"Za nas kasno je" (Live)	2022	Pop folk hitovi Vol. 1 (Live)

== Other charted songs ==
List of singles as featured artist, showing year released, chart positions, certifications and album name
Title	Year	Peak chart positions	Album
Title	Year	CRO Billb.	Album
"Devet života"	2023	2	Devet života
"Dam dam dam"	2023	1	Devet života
"Placebo"	2023	11	Devet života
"Psiho"	2023	9	Devet života
"Prvi si počeo"	2023	14	Devet života
"Sve po starom"	2023	6	Devet života
"Macho Man" (featuring Dejan Petrović)	2026	2	Bol i alkohol
"Kababa"	2026	5	Bol i alkohol

== Other appearances ==
List of non-single guest appearances, with other performing artists, showing year released and album name
Title	Year	Other artist(s)	Album
"Majko"	2009	none	Non-album songs
"Boli svaka tvoja reč"	2009	none	Non-album songs
"Još večeras plakaću za tobom"	2013	none	Zvezde Granda 2013
"Ma pusti ponos"	2013	Amar Jašarspahić	Čovjek tvoga sna

== Music videos ==
List of music videos, showing year released and directors
Title	Year	Director(s)
"Za nas kasno je"	2015	Goran Šljivić
"Šta bi" (MC Stojan featuring Aleksandra Prijović)	2015	Andrej Ilić
"Totalna anestezija"	2016	Andrej Ilić
"Senke"	2016	Andrej Ilić
"Litar vina, litar krvi" (with Aco Pejović featuring Dejan Petrović)	2017	Andrej Ilić
"Testament"	2017	Aleksandar Kerekeš
"Sledeća"	2017	Fanatic Media
"Telo"	2017	Andrej Ilić
"Klizav pod"	2017	Aleksandar Kerekeš
"Separe"	2017	Petar Pašić
"Mesto zločina"	2017	Bojan Kosović
"Voljena greško"	2017	Andrej Ilić
"Ko si ti" (with Saša Matić)	2018	Aleksandar Kerekeš
"Neponovljivo"	2019	Petar Pašić
"Bogata sirotinja" (Stage Performance)	2019	Fanatic Media; Grand Production
"Duguješ mi dva života"	2020	Film danas d.o.o.
"Legitimno"	2020	Aleksandar Kerekeš
"Dođi sebi" (with Lexington)	2021	Petar Pašić
"Zvuk tišine"	2022	Aleksandar Kerekeš
"Svetlo"	2022	Nemanja Novaković
"Sabotiram"	2022	Nemanja Novaković
"Javno mesto"	2022	Nemanja Novaković
"Ogavno"	2022	Aleksandar Kerekeš
"Ja sam odlično"	2022	Petar Pašić
"Marš"	2022	Nemanja Novaković
"Kuća strave"	2023	Aleksandar Kerekeš
"Devet života"	2023	Aleksandar Kerekeš
"Placebo"	2023	Nemanja Novaković
"Psiho"	2023	Andrija Grkić
"Prvi si počeo"	2023	Aleksandar Kerekeš
"Ludnica" (with Dejan Kostić)	2023	Aleksandar Kerekeš
"Zver"	2023	Petar Pašić
"Dam dam dam"	2023	Andrija Grkić
"Sve po starom"	2023	Nemanja Novaković
"Poslednji kabare"	2024	Petar Pašić
"Rugoba"	2026	Aleksandar Kerekeš
"Halo"	2026	Petar Pašić
"Kababa"	2026	Aleksandar Kerekeš
"Olovo"	2026	Aleksandar Kerekeš
"Gatara"	2026	Aleksandar Kerekeš
"Macho Man" (featuring Dejan Petrović)	2026	Petar Pašić
"Konobari"	2026	Petar Pašić
"Opa cupa"	2026	Petar Pašić
"Vreme prolazi"	2026	Petar Pašić
