= 2002–03 Bosnia and Herzegovina Hockey League season =

2002-2004 Bosnia and Herzegovina Hockey League
- League: Bosnia and Herzegovina Hockey League
- Sport: Ice hockey
- Number of teams: 4
- Regular-season winner: HK Bosna
- Champions: HK Bosna
- Runners-up: HK Ilidža 2010

Bosnia and Herzegovina Hockey League seasons
- 2009-2010 Season →

The 2002–03 Bosnia and Herzegovina Hockey League season was the first season of Bosnia and Herzegovina's hockey league, and represents the return of competitive hockey in Bosnia after the dissolution of the Yugoslav Ice Hockey League.

== League business ==
The 2002–03 season is the first season of the Bosnia and Herzegovina Hockey League. Four teams entered the season. HK Bosna which was formed in 1980 played in their first league competition since the 1987–88 Yugoslav Ice Hockey League season. The three other teams were formed in 2002. HK Ilidža 2010 was based in Ilidža, HK Jahorina in Pale, and HK Šampion in Sarajevo. Each team played 16 games before the top two teams entered into a three game playoff.

The formation of the four team league also allowed the Bosnia and Herzegovina Ice Hockey Federation to meet the prerequisite of entering the Ice Hockey World Championships.

Following the end of the season two of the newly formed clubs, HK Jahorina and HK Šampion, folded causing the 2003–04 season to be cancelled and the Bosnia and Herzegovina Hockey League to go into a six year hiatus until the 2009–10 season.

== Regular season standings ==
Team	GP	GF	GA	GDF	PTS
HK Bosna	16	232	8	+224	32
HK Ilidža 2010	16	102	63	+39	24
HK Jahorina	16	62	117	–55	12
HK Šampion	16	49	150	–101	8

== Playoffs ==
HK Bosna and HK Ilidža 2010 qualified for the playoffs after finishing first and second in the regular season standings respectively. HK Bosna won the best of three playoff series in two games.

HK Ilidža 2010	2 – 7	HK Bosna

Game reference

HK Ilidža 2010	3 – 11	HK Bosna

Game reference
