= 2011–12 Bosnia and Herzegovina Hockey League season =

2011–12 BHHL season
- League: Bosnia and Herzegovina Hockey League
- Sport: Ice hockey
- Number of teams: 3
- Regular season winner: HK Ajkule Ilidža 2010
- Finals champions: HK Ajkule Ilidža 2010
- Runners-up: HK Alfa

Bosnia and Herzegovina Hockey League seasons
- ← 2010–11 2012–13 →

The 2011–12 Bosnia and Herzegovina Hockey League is the 4th season of the Bosnia and Herzegovina Hockey League (BHHL). It started on January 9, 2012.

== League business ==
Prior to the start of the 2011–12 season it was announced that HK Bosna and left the league to play in the newly formed Open Championship of Bosnia and Herzegovina, an international league with teams from Bulgaria, Greece, and the Republic of Macedonia. HK Ilidža 2010 was renamed HK Ajkule Ilidža 2010 for the season and also changed their team logo. All games will again be played in Sarajevo at the Olympic Hall Zetra, now known as Olympic Hall Juan Antonio Samaranch.

Each team will play ten games for the season before the playoff. Following on from the previous season HK Alfa and HK Stari Grad will continue to play under their nicknames of HK Medvjedi and HK Vukovi respectively.

In February 2012 heavy snowfall caused the collapse of the roof that covered the rink leading to the season being indefinitely postponed. In November 2012 the season resumed after the ice rink was re-installed. Three games were played to complete the regular season before the top two ranked teams advanced to the finals playoff.

== Regular season ==
The regular season consisted of each team playing 10 games.

Qualified for the playoff

Team	GP	W	OTW	OTL	L	GF	GA	GDF	PTS
HK Ajkule Ilidža 2010	10	3	4	0	3	28	22	+6	17
HK Alfa	10	4	0	3	3	21	27	–6	15
HK Stari Grad	10	4	0	1	5	22	22	0	13

=== Schedule ===
Game	Date	Time	Home	Score	Away	Recap
1	9 January	22:30	HK Alfa	2 – 3 (SO)	HK Ajkule Ilidža 2010	
2	11 January	22:30	HK Ajkule Ilidža 2010	2 – 6	HK Stari Grad	
3	15 January	22:30	HK Stari Grad	2 – 4	HK Alfa	
4	16 January	22:30	HK Ajkule Ilidža 2010	4 – 5 (SO)	HK Alfa	
5	19 January	22:30	HK Stari Grad	2 – 4	HK Ajkule Ilidža 2010	
6	22 January	19:30	HK Alfa	0 – 4	HK Stari Grad	
7	23 January	22:30	HK Alfa	2 – 1 (SO)	HK Ajkule Ilidža 2010	
8	26 January	22:30	HK Ajkule Ilidža 2010	1 – 0	HK Stari Grad	
9	29 January	22:30	HK Stari Grad	4 – 1	HK Alfa	
10	30 January	22:30	HK Ajkule Ilidža 2010	2 – 1	HK Alfa	
11	2 February	22:30	HK Stari Grad	3 – 4 (SO)	HK Ajkule Ilidža 2010	
12	6 March	22:30	HK Stari Grad	2 – 1	HK Alfa	
13	27 November	22:30	HK Ajkule Ilidža 2010	0 – 1	HK Alfa	
14	29 November	22:30	HK Ajkule Ilidža 2010	3 – 2	HK Stari Grad	
15	2 December	19:30	HK Stari Grad	1 – 2	HK Alfa	

== Playoffs ==
HK Ajkule Ilidža 2010 and HK Alfa qualified for the playoffs after finishing first and second in the regular season standings respectively. HK Ajkule Ilidža 2010 won the single game final 3–2 in a shootout.

HK Ajkule Ilidža 2010	3 – 2 (SO)	HK Alfa

Game reference
