= 2013–14 Bosnia and Herzegovina Hockey League season =

2013–14 BHHL season
- League: Bosnia and Herzegovina Hockey League
- Sport: Ice hockey
- Number of teams: 4
- Regular season winner: HK Stari Grad
- Finals champions: HK Stari Grad
- Runners-up: HK Ilidža 2010

Bosnia and Herzegovina Hockey League seasons
- ← 2012–13 2014–15 →

The 2013–14 Bosnia and Herzegovina Hockey League season was the sixth season of the Bosnia and Herzegovina Hockey League (BHHL). Four teams participated in the league, and HK Stari Grad won the championship.

== Regular season ==
| | Club | GP | W | L | OTW | OTL | Pts |
|---|---|---|---|---|---|---|---|
| 1. | HK Stari Grad | 15 | 10 | 2 | 2 | 1 | 35 |
| 2. | HK Ilidža 2010 | 15 | 8 | 6 | 0 | 1 | 25 |
| 3. | HK Medvjedi Sarajevo | 15 | 5 | 8 | 1 | 1 | 18 |
| 4. | Blue Bulls Sarajevo | 15 | 3 | 10 | 1 | 1 | 12 |

== Final ==
| Teams | | | Series | 1 | 2 | 3 |
|---|---|---|---|---|---|---|
| HK Stari Grad | - | HK Ilidža 2010 | 2:0 | 5:1 (3:0, 1:1, 1:0) | 4:2 (0:1, 3:0, 1:1) | – |
