= HK Ajkule Ilidža 2010 =

HK Ajkule
- City: Ilidža, Bosnia and Herzegovina
- League: BiH Hockey League
- Founded: 2002; 24 years ago (as HK Ilidža)
- Home arena: Olympic Hall Zetra
- Colours

Franchise history
- 2002–2010: HK Ilidža
- 2010–present: HK Ajkule Ilidža 2010

HK Ajkule Ilidža 2010 is a professional ice hockey team in Ilidža, Bosnia and Herzegovina. The team was founded in 2002, and plays in the Bosnia and Herzegovina Hockey League. Despite being from Ilidža, the club plays its games at Olympic Hall Zetra, in Sarajevo.

== History ==
HK Ajkule Ilidža 2010 was founded in 2002 as HK Ilidža 2010 and joined the Bosnia and Herzegovina Hockey League to compete in its inaugural season. HK Ilidža 2010 finished second in the 2002–03 regular season standings and qualified for the best of three playoffs with first place finisher HK Bosna. Ilidža finished as runners-up after losing the first two games to HK Bosna. After the end of the 2002–03 season the league was disbanded for six years before returning in 2009. Ilidža however did not enter the 2009–10 season but rejoined the league for the 2010–11 season. Ilidža finished in last place managing only four wins in their 15 regular season games. During the 2010–11 season Ilidža also competed in the Jaroslav Jandourek Cup. Ilidža was drawn against HK Alfa for their first game. Ilidža won the game 6–3 and advanced to the final against HK Bosna who had defeated HK Stari Grad in their opening game. Ilidža won the Jaroslav Jandourek Cup after defeating HK Bosna in the final. For the start of the 2011–12 season the team was renamed to HK Ajkule Ilidža 2010.

== Season-by-season record ==
Bosnia and Herzegovina Hockey League

Season	GP	W	SOW	SOL	L	GF	GA	PTS	Finish	Playoff
2002–03	16					102	63	24	2nd	Loss final series vs. HK Bosna, 0–2
2010–11	15	4	0	1	10	45	46	13	4th	Did not qualify

Jaroslav Jandourek Cup

- 2011 Jaroslav Jandourek Cup — Won semi-final 3–6 vs. HK Alfa. Won final 2–1 vs. HK Bosna
