= Morača Sports Center =

Multi-sports venue in Podgorica, Montenegro

Morača Sports Centre Sportski centar Morača
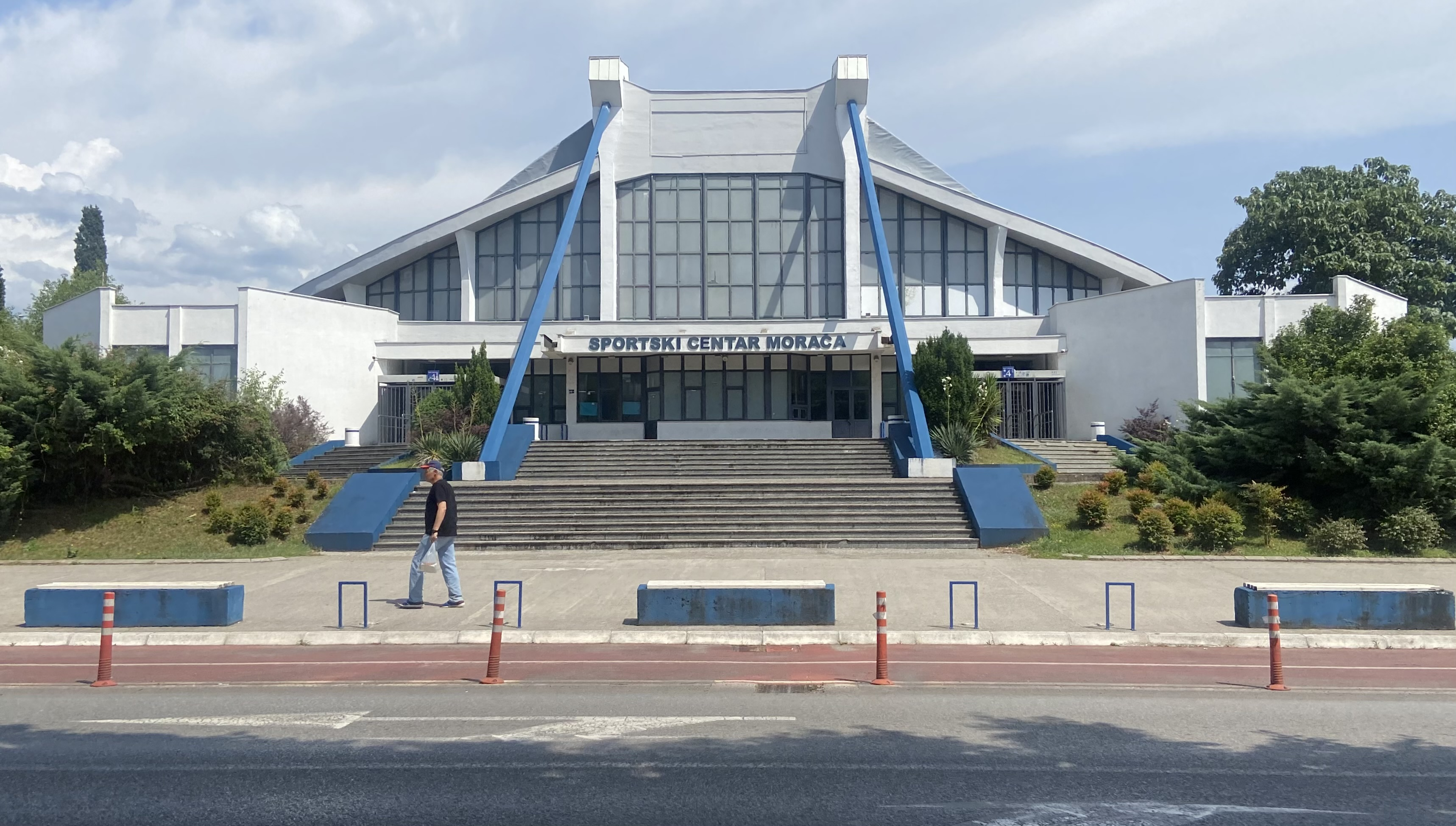
- Exterior of the Morača Sports Centre
- Interactive map of Morača Sports Centre; Sportski centar Morača
- Location: Podgorica, Montenegro
- Coordinates: 42°26′16″N 19°15′15″E
- Owner: City of Podgorica
- Capacity: 6,000

Construction
- Opened: 1978
- Renovated: 2005, 2018
- Expanded: 2018
- Cost: €4.5 million euros (2018 renovation)
- Architect: Miško Savov Dmitrović

Tenants
- KK Budućnost; ŽRK Budućnost; ŽKK Budućnost

Morača Sports Centre (Montenegrin: Sportski centar Morača, Спортски центар Морача) is a multi-sports venue that is located in Podgorica, Montenegro.

The venue is located in the new part of Podgorica, on the right bank of Morača River, after which it got its name. Construction of the sports complex began in 1978, and various sporting facilities are scattered within it, across a five hectare area. Besides being a sports venue, Morača Sports Centre also hosts various concerts and events.

Since September 2024, the arena has been renamed M Tel Morača Arena after its general sponsor. In the following period, in addition to sports events, other manifestations were held as well, such as concerts by major musical performers from the former Yugoslav region.

== History ==
The new venue was inaugurated with a friendly basketball game between the Yugoslav national team and Wichita State University.

The complex's main indoor hall hosted six preliminary-round games of EuroBasket 2005. The venue underwent a major refurbishment for the tournament in order to meet the arena standards imposed by FIBA.

With the immense growth of the popularity of water polo in Montenegro, two brand new open-air swimming pools were added to the facility in 2009, which also hosted the 2009 FINA Water Polo World League.

In 2018, the arena's main hall underwent renovations and expansion, in order to meet the arena standards of the EuroLeague. Its seating capacity was increased to 6,000, and VIP lounges were also added. The cost of the renovation project was €4.5 million euros. Also, former indoor pool arena (which was in disrepair and unused for over a decade) was repurposed as a basketball / volleyball / handball hall, with seating capacity of 2,200. The venue will host the 2022 European Women's Handball Championship for the preliminary rounds.

== Facilities ==
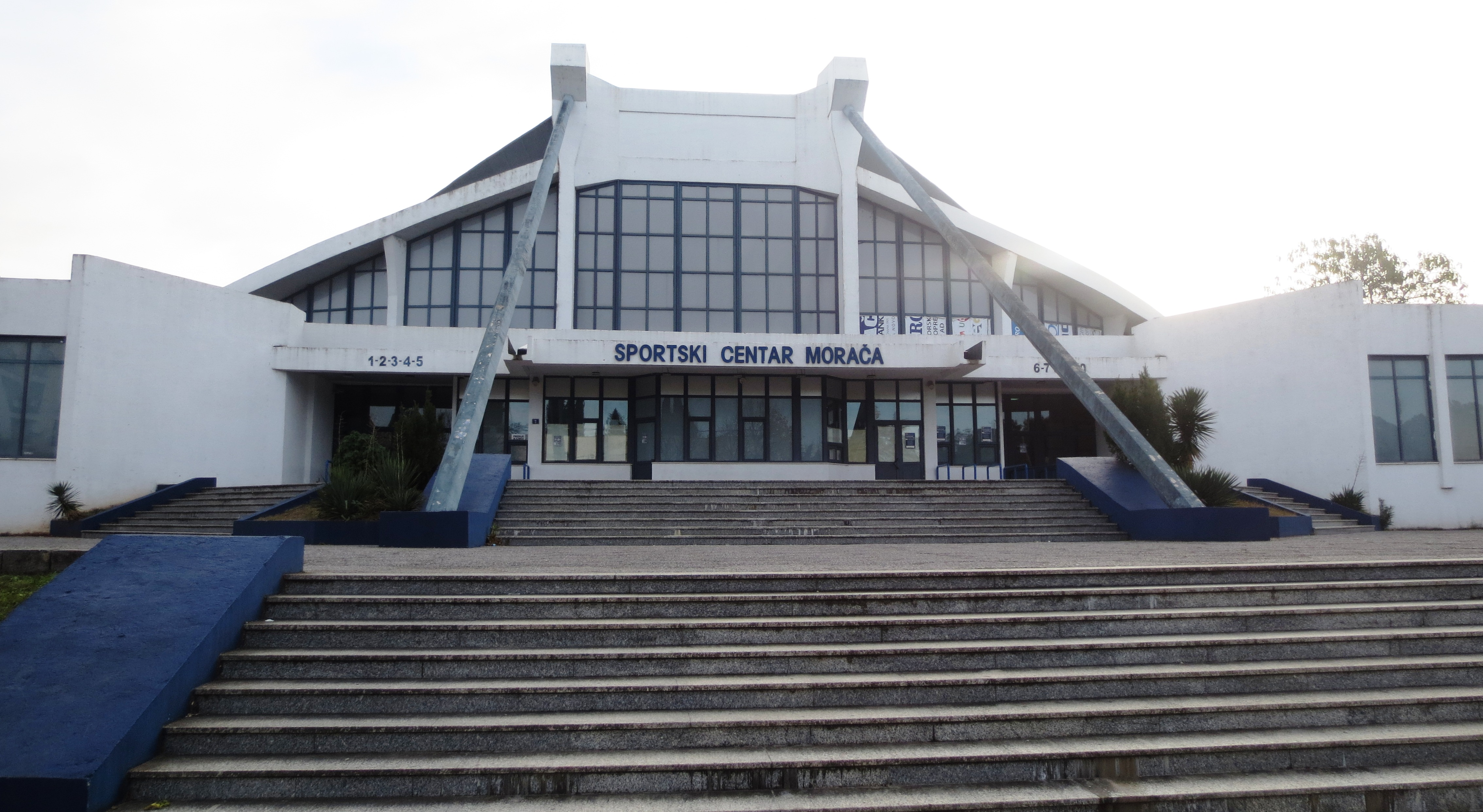
Entrance to the main hall in 2015

The sports complex's main indoor hall serves as the primary multi-purpose indoor arena in Podgorica. It is best known as home arena of SD Budućnost Podgorica's basketball, volleyball and handball teams.

- Main Hall (capacity 6,000 seats in the stands)
- Bemax Hall (capacity 2,200 seats in the stands)
- Olympic size (50m x 25m) open-air swimming pool (capacity 1,900 seats in the stands)
- Water polo size (33,40m x 25m) indoor pool (capacity 664 seats in the stands)
- Combat Sports Hall
- Sauna
- Table Tennis Hall
- Business facilities (restaurant, gym)
- Media room
- Outdoor futsal / handball court
- Outdoor running track

== Sporting events hosted ==
- EuroBasket 2005 Group B
- 2011–12 EHF_ Women's Champions League Final
- SUPERKOMBAT World Grand Prix I 2012
- 2022 European Women's Handball Championship Group D
- Eurovolley Men 2028

== Concerts and other events ==
List of Concerts and Other Events

1980s

- Riblja Čorba - April 20, 1987 (Ujed za dušu Tour)
- Riblja Čorba - December 1, 1988 (Priča o ljubavi obično ugnjavi Tour)

1990s

- Riblja Čorba - May 11, 1995

2020s

- Dragana Mirković - March 22, 2024 (Do poslednjeg daha Tour)
- Aleksandra Prijović - April 19, 2024 (Od istoka do zapada Tour)
- Aleksandra Prijović - April 20, 2024
- Lepa Brena - May 25, 2024 (Imam pesmu da vam pevam Tour)
- Zdravko Čolić - October 17, 2025
- Zdravko Čolić - October 18, 2025
- Bijelo Dugme - November 22, 2025
- Peđa Jovanović & Big Concert Orchestra - November 29, 2025
- Tea Tairović - April 4, 2026
