= Od Istoka Do Zapada Tour =

2023–24 concert tour by Aleksandra Prijović

Od Istoka Do Zapada World Tour
- Tour by Aleksandra Prijović
- Promotional poster for concert in Belgrade at Belgrade Arena, September 2023
- Location: Europe; North America
- Associated album: Devet života
- Start date: 28 September 2023
- End date: 22 December 2024
- Legs: 2
- No. of shows: 63

The Od Istoka Do Zapada World Tour was the headlining concert tour by Serbian pop-folk singer Aleksandra Prijović, in support of her third studio album, Devet života (2023). The tour began on 28 September 2023, in Belgrade, Serbia, at Belgrade Arena and concluded on 22 December 2024 in Belgrade, at the same venue. The tour was also visited other major cities in Southeast European countries, such as Sarajevo, Niš, Zagreb, Kragujevac, Banja Luka, Novi Sad, Rijeka, Podgorica, Ljubljana and Split, including Chicago, the only concert stop of the tour in the United States.

With Od Istoka Do Zapada Tour, Prijović became the first regional artist to managed, to sell out several consecutive concerts in the biggest concert halls in all major cities in Southeast European countries. It has had a cultural impact in the region, and is considered as one of the biggest tours in the Balkans with 584.000 tickets sold.

== Background ==
In February 2023, Prijović announced via her social media that she would go on her debut headlining and debut arena tour Od Istoka Do Zapada, with the first concert starting on 29 September 2023, in Belgrade at Štark Arena. The tickets for the show went on sale the same day she confirmed the tour. Three months after announcing of the concert in Belgrade, Prijović announced the concerts in Sarajevo at Zetra, which would be held on 28 October, and in Zagreb at Arena Zagreb, which would be held on 1 December of the same year. On 3 July 2023, Prijović held a press conference in Belgrade, where due to high demand and fast ticket sales, she revealed the date for the second concert in the Štark Arena to be held on 30 September 2023.

After only two months of the announcement, Prijović sold out a concert at Arena Zagreb, and scheduled a second concert in the venue for 2 December 2023. Via her Instagram, Prijović thanked her fans for the love she receives and the sold-out halls, and also announced a third concert in Štark Arena to be held on 28 September 2023. As she explained, the schedule in the venue was tight and overbooked, so the only option was to schedule the third concert before the two concerts she had already scheduled. This decision angered numerous fans who bought tickets for the concert to be held on 29 September, so Prijović and her team allowed everyone who bought tickets for the 29 September date to exchange them for the 28 September one. In just eight months, the singer scheduled a total of 27 concerts in the largest regional arenas, where, due to the high demand, the websites responsible for the ticket sale in Serbia, EFinity and Tickets.rs, crashed.

== Reception and commercial performance ==
The Od Istoka Do Zapada Tour saw a big commercial success. Prijović became the first Serbian female artist to sell out three consecutive concerts at Štark Arena. Reportedly, she grossed around one million euros with sales of 50,000 tickets for the three initial dates in Belgrade. Furthermore, by selling out four, and later five consecutive concerts at Arena Zagreb she became a "regional phenomenon", according to the N1 Serbia, and was dubbed the "only folk diva of the new generation" by the Index.hr. In October 2023, Prijović also discussed the success of her first headline tour on a talk show broadcast by Croatian Radiotelevision, which was seen a precedent for a Serbian pop-folk singer. N1 Slovenia also dubbed Prijović as the "Balkan Taylor Swift", comparing the success of her tour with the Swift's The Eras Tour.

During the Zagreb concerts in December 2023, Anđelo Jurkas ranked ten best songs of Prijović's and criticised the critics of turbo-folk in Croatia, writing: "Composers like Dejan Kostić, together with the lyrical and rhyming achievements of Dragan Brajović Braja and Filip Živojinović, offer nothing below average within the given style. Their stereotypes don't make your ears bleed, your eardrums burst, or your soul press charges for emotional distress. On the contrary."

In their campaign for the 2024 Croatian parliamentary election, which bore the slogan "Hrvatska treba Srbe jer..." ("Croatia needs Serbs because..."), the Independent Democratic Serb Party (SDSS) referenced Prijović's Zagreb concerts in one of their billboards, writing "Hrvatska treba Srbe jer puna arena prija svima" ("Croatia needs Serbs because a full arena is pleasant for everyone") and making a pun on Prijović's nickname "Prija" in the process.

== Set list ==
The following set list is from the concert on September 30, 2023, in Belgrade. It is not intended to represent all shows of the tour.

1. "Za nas kasno je"
2. "Testament"
3. "Ja sam odlično"
4. "Javno mesto"
5. "Totalna anestezija"
6. "Kuća strave"
7. "Marš"
8. "Senke"
9. "Klizav pod"
10. "Ludnica" (featuring Dejan Kostić)
11. "Moj život" (cover by Dejan Kostić)
12. "Dozvola za ljubav" (cover by Dejan Kostić)
13. "Dam dam dam"
14. "Zver"
15. "Legitimno"
16. "Separe"
17. "Devet života"
18. "Placebo"
19. "Psiho"
20. "Duguješ mi dva života"
21. "Sve po starom"
22. "Litar vina, litar krvi"
23. "Ko si ti" (featuring Saša Matić)
24. "Idemo anđele" (Saša Matić)
25. "Lagala je grade" (Saša Matić)
26. "Zvuk tišine"
27. "Sabotiram"
28. "Svetlo"
29. "Telo"
30. "Prvi si počeo"
31. "Bogata sirotinja"
32. "Sledeća"
33. "Sačuvaj tajnu" (Duško Kuliš cover)
34. "Ti mene ne voliš" (Osman Hadžić cover)
35. "Nije mene dušo ubilo" (Goran Dimitrijadis Dima cover)
36. "Ružica si bila" (Bijelo Dugme cover)
37. "Jugoslovenka" (Lepa Brena cover; featuring Dejan Kostić)
38. "Ja sam odlično" (reprise)
39. "Dam dam dam" (reprise)
40. "Zvuk tišine" (reprise)
41. "Psiho" (reprise)
42. "Za nas kasno je" (chorus only; reprise)

== Tour dates ==
List of concerts, showing date, city, country, venue and attendance
Date	City	Country	Venue	Attendance
September 28, 2023	Belgrade	Serbia	Štark Arena	60.000
September 29, 2023	Belgrade	Serbia	Štark Arena	60.000
September 30, 2023	Belgrade	Serbia	Štark Arena	60.000
October 28, 2023	Sarajevo	Bosnia and Herzegovina	Zetra Hall	45.000
October 29, 2023	Sarajevo	Bosnia and Herzegovina	Zetra Hall	45.000
October 30, 2023	Sarajevo	Bosnia and Herzegovina	Zetra Hall	45.000
November 10, 2023	Niš	Serbia	Čair Hall	20.000
November 11, 2023	Niš	Serbia	Čair Hall	20.000
November 12, 2023	Niš	Serbia	Čair Hall	20.000
December 1, 2023	Zagreb	Croatia	Arena Zagreb	90.000
December 2, 2023	Zagreb	Croatia	Arena Zagreb	90.000
December 3, 2023	Zagreb	Croatia	Arena Zagreb	90.000
December 4, 2023	Zagreb	Croatia	Arena Zagreb	90.000
December 6, 2023	Zagreb	Croatia	Arena Zagreb	90.000
December 22, 2023	Tuzla	Bosnia and Herzegovina	Dvorana Mejdan	16.000
December 23, 2023	Tuzla	Bosnia and Herzegovina	Dvorana Mejdan	16.000
February 13, 2024	Osijek	Croatia	Gradski vrt Hall	25.000
February 14, 2024	Osijek	Croatia	Gradski vrt Hall	25.000
February 15, 2024	Osijek	Croatia	Gradski vrt Hall	25.000
February 17, 2024	Osijek	Croatia	Gradski vrt Hall	25.000
February 18, 2024	Osijek	Croatia	Gradski vrt Hall	25.000
March 20, 2024	Kragujevac	Serbia	Hala Jezero	6.000
March 26, 2024	Vršac	Serbia	Millennium Centar	5.500
March 28, 2024	Banja Luka	Bosnia and Herzegovina	Sportska dvorana Borik	15.000
March 29, 2024	Banja Luka	Bosnia and Herzegovina	Sportska dvorana Borik	15.000
March 31, 2024	Banja Luka	Bosnia and Herzegovina	Sportska dvorana Borik	15.000
April 5, 2024	Novi Sad	Serbia	Spens Hall	30.000
April 6, 2024	Novi Sad	Serbia	Spens Hall	30.000
April 7, 2024	Novi Sad	Serbia	Spens Hall	30.000
April 12, 2024	Zenica	Bosnia and Herzegovina	Arena Zenica	10.000
April 14, 2024	Rijeka	Croatia	Centar Zamet	15.000
April 15, 2024	Rijeka	Croatia	Centar Zamet	15.000
April 16, 2024	Rijeka	Croatia	Centar Zamet	15.000
April 19, 2024	Podgorica	Montenegro	Morača Sports Center	10.000
April 20, 2024	Podgorica	Montenegro	Morača Sports Center	10.000
April 26, 2024	Varaždin	Croatia	Varaždin Arena	23.000
April 27, 2024	Varaždin	Croatia	Varaždin Arena	23.000
April 28, 2024	Varaždin	Croatia	Varaždin Arena	23.000
May 10, 2024	Ljubljana	Slovenia	Arena Stožice	14.500
June 7, 2024	Zadar	Croatia	Krešimir Ćosić Hall	7.500
July 19, 2024	Brčko	Bosnia and Herzegovina	Muzička Arena	5.000
July 21, 2024	Budva	Montenegro	Top Hill	5.000
July 28,2024	Budva	Montenegro	Top Hill	5.000
August 1, 2024	Ohrid	North Macedonia	Stadium Biljanin Izvor	20.000
August 4, 2024	Budva	Montenegro	Top Hill	5.000
August 8, 2024	Doboj	Bosnia and Herzegovina	Rukometni Stadion	6.500
August 14, 2024	Vrnjačka Banja	Serbia	Stadium Kocka	5.000
August 17, 2024	Trebinje	Bosnia and Herzegovina	Poligon Grad Sunca	10.000
September 7, 2024	Frankfurt	Germany	Jahrhunderthalle	6.000
September 13, 2024	Zurich	Switzerland	Stadthalle Dietikon	4.000
September 14, 2024	Zurich	Switzerland	Stadthalle Dietikon	4.000
September 28, 2024	Munich	Germany	Zenith Building	5.800
October 4, 2024	Vienna	Austria	Hallmann Dome	4.000
October 5, 2024	Vienna	Austria	Hallmann Dome	4.000
October 6, 2024	Vienna	Austria	Hallmann Dome	4.000
October 12, 2024	Cologne	Germany	Lanxess Arena	5.000
November 9, 2024	Split	Croatia	Arena Gripe	13.000
November 10, 2024	Split	Croatia	Arena Gripe	13.000
November 22, 2024	Skopje	North Macedonia	Jane Sandanski Arena	10.000
November 25, 2024	Zagreb	Croatia	Arena Zagreb	20.000
November 30, 2024	Chicago	United States	Now Arena	6.000
December 6, 2024	Sarajevo	Bosnia and Herzegovina	Zetra Hall	20.000
December 22, 2024	Belgrade	Serbia	Beogradska Arena	25.000
Total				584.000
