= 2009–10 Bosnia and Herzegovina Hockey League season =

2009–10 Bosnia and Herzegovina Hockey League
- League: Bosnia and Herzegovina Hockey League
- Sport: Ice hockey
- Number of teams: 3
- Regular-season winner: HK Bosna
- Champions: HK Stari Grad
- Runners-up: HK Bosna

Bosnia and Herzegovina Hockey League seasons
- ← 2002–03 2010–11 →

The 2009–10 Bosnia and Herzegovina Hockey League season was the second season of the Bosnia and Herzegovina Hockey League (BHL), after a 6-year hiatus. HK Stari Grad defeated HK Bosna in the best of three final series two games to one, winning the championship.

== League business ==
For the 2009–10 season all games will be played at the Olympic Hall Zetra. The league employs modified rules. Games last for 45 minutes without a stopping clock, and contact is not allowed. The season opened with the three teams with only one, HK Bosna, returning from the previous season. The two new teams are HK Stari Grad and HK Alfa who were founded in 2002 and 2003 respectively. Each played ten games before the top two teams enter the three game playoffs.

The three teams were given nicknames to play under for the season. HK Bosna plays under the name Lisice sa Općine Centar, HK Alfa plays under the name Medvjedi iz Novog Sarajeva, and HK Stari Grad plays under the name Vukovi sa Starog Grada.

== Regular season ==
=== Standings ===
Team	GP	W	OTW	OTL	L	GF	GA	GDF	PTS
HK Bosna	10	5	1	1	3	25	21	+4	18
HK Stari Grad	10	4	2	0	4	24	20	+4	16
HK Alfa	10	3	0	2	5	21	29	-8	11

=== Fixtures ===
December 29, 2009; 22:30	HK Bosna	2 – 1 (1–0, 1–0, 0–1)	HK Stari Grad	Olympic Hall Zetra

Game reference

January 2, 2010; 22:30	HK Alfa	3 – 4 (SO) (1–1, 1–1, 1–1, 0–2)	HK Stari Grad	Olympic Hall Zetra

Game reference

January 5, 2010; 22:30	HK Bosna	2 – 5 (1–1, 0–3, 1–1)	HK Alfa	Olympic Hall Zetra

Game reference

January 8, 2010; 22:30	HK Bosna	0 – 2 (0–1, 0–0, 0–1)	HK Stari Grad	Olympic Hall Zetra

Game reference

January 13, 2010; 22:30	HK Alfa	0 – 5 (0–1, 0–1, 0–3)	HK Stari Grad	Olympic Hall Zetra

Game reference

January 15, 2010; 22:30	HK Alfa	2 – 3 (SO) (2–1, 0–0, 0–1, 1–2)	HK Bosna	Olympic Hall Zetra

Game reference

January 19, 2010; 22:30	HK Bosna	5 – 2 (2–0, 2–0, 1–2)	HK Stari Grad	Olympic Hall Zetra

Game reference

January 22, 2010; 22:30	HK Alfa	4 – 2 (0–0, 1–0, 3–2)	HK Stari Grad	Olympic Hall Zetra

Game reference

January 26, 2010; 22:30	HK Bosna	3 – 0 (3–0, 0–0, 0–0)	HK Alfa	Olympic Hall Zetra

Game reference

January 29, 2010; 22:30	HK Bosna	2 – 1 (0–0, 0–0, 2–1)	HK Stari Grad	Olympic Hall Zetra

Game reference

February 2, 2010; 22:30	HK Alfa	0 – 1 (0–1, 0–0, 0–0)	HK Stari Grad	Olympic Hall Zetra

Game reference

February 5, 2010; 22:30	HK Bosna	4 – 2 (2–0, 1–0, 1–2)	HK Alfa	Olympic Hall Zetra

Game reference

February 9, 2010; 22:30	HK Stari Grad	3 – 2 (SO) (1–1, 0–0, 1–1, 2-0)	HK Bosna	Olympic Hall Zetra

Game reference

February 2, 2010; 22:30	HK Alfa	2 – 3 (2–2, 0–0, 0–1)	HK Stari Grad	Olympic Hall Zetra

Game reference

February 16, 2010; 22:30	HK Bosna	2 – 3 (2–0, 0–2, 0–1)	HK Alfa	Olympic Hall Zetra

Game reference

== Playoffs ==
HK Bosna and HK Stari Grad qualified for the playoffs after finishing first and second in the regular season standings respectively. HK Stari Grad won the best of three championship series, two games to one.

March 19, 2010; 22:30	HK Bosna	1 – 5 (1–0, 0–4, 0–1)	HK Stari Grad

Game reference

March 20, 2010; 22:30	HK Stari Grad	1 – 2 (0–1, 0–1, 1–0)	HK Bosna

Game reference

March 21, 2010; 22:30	HK Bosna	2 – 3 (1–2, 0–1, 1–0)	HK Stari Grad

Game reference
