= Bosnia and Herzegovina Hockey League =

First division hockey league in Bosnia and Herzegovina

- Sport: Ice hockey
- Founded: 2002
- Founder: BH Ice Hockey Federation
- First season: 2002–03
- No. of teams: Various
- Country: Bosnia and Herzegovina
- Venue: Zetra Olympic Hall
- Most titles: HK Vukovi (3)
- Website: http://www.hsbih.ba

The Bosnia and Herzegovina Hockey League (BHL) is the top league for ice hockey in Bosnia and Herzegovina. It is organized by the Bosnia and Herzegovina Ice Hockey Federation.

== History ==
Hockey developed slowly in Bosnia and Herzegovina, all of it being concentrated in Sarajevo. By the later 1980s, one team, HK Bosna, made it to the Yugoslav Hockey League. With the end of Yugoslavia came the end of hockey in the country, for some time. War and economic difficulties prevented the organization/formation of a league for some time. The first season of the league was held in 2002–03, with four teams. After the season three teams simply were not able to remain active. With their demise, the league went into a hiatus for six years until the 2009–10 season. The league is strictly amateur at this time with a low/developmental level of play with no body checking.

All hockey games in BiH are played out in the country's biggest city and capital, Sarajevo, at Olympic Hall Zetra. A second rink at Skenderija that fell in disrepair was not ready in time for the 2009 season. Reconstruction started in February 2010. Currently, no other city has a regulation sized ice-rink. For the start of the 2011–12 season it was announced that HK Bosna and left the league to play in the newly formed Open Championship of Bosnia and Herzegovina, an international league with teams from Bulgaria, Greece, and the Republic of Macedonia. The league also changed its abbreviation from "BHL" to "BHHL" and HK Ilidža 2010 changed its name to HK Ajkule Ilidža 2010.

== Teams ==
The 2002–03 season had four teams competing — HK Bosna, HK Ilidža 2010, HK Jahorina, and HK Šampion. However following the end of the season both HK Jahorina and HK Šampion folded and the league went on hiatus. When the league returned in for the 2009–10 season two new teams, HK Stari Grad and HK Alfa, joined the league with HK Bosna. The 2010–11 season has four teams competing in Sarajevo with the three teams competing from the previous season and the return of HK Ilidža 2010. The 2011–12 season was reduced to three teams after HK Bosna left the league, returning in later seasons.

Team	City	Home stadium	Founded	Joined	Notes
HK Medvjedi	Novo Sarajevo	Olympic Hall Zetra	2003	2009	Played under the name of HK Medvjedi for the 2011–12 season.
HK Ajkule Ilidža 2010	Ilidža	Olympic Hall Zetra	2002		Did not compete in the 2009–10 season. Formally known as HK Ilidža 2010.
HK Bosna	Centar, Sarajevo	Olympic Hall Zetra	1980	2002	Did not compete in the 2011–12 season, currently merged with national junior team.
HK Vukovi	Stari Grad, Sarajevo	Olympic Hall Zetra	2002	2009	Played under the name of HK Vukovi for the 2011–12 season.
Blue Bulls Sarajevo	Sarajevo	Olympic Hall Zetra	2013	2013	

=== Former teams ===
Team	City	Founded	Notes
HK Jahorina	Pale	2002	Competed only in the 2002–03 season before folding.
HK Šampion	Sarajevo	2002	Competed only in the 2002–03 season before folding.

== Seasons and champions ==
Logo used during the 2009–10 season

- 2002–03 — HK Bosna finished first in the regular season and won the playoff series 2–0 against HK Ilidža 2010.
- 2009–10 — HK Bosna finished first in the regular season. HK Stari Grad won the playoff series 2–1 against HK Bosna.
- 2010–11 — HK Bosna finished first in the regular season and won the playoff series 2–0 against HK Alfa
- 2011–12 — HK Ajkule Ilidža 2010 finished first in the regular season and won the single game final 3–2 against HK Alfa.
- 2012–13 — HK Stari Grad Vukovi finished first in the regular season and beat HK Medvjedi Sarajevo in two straight games.
- 2013–14 — HK Stari Grad Vukovi finished first in the regular season and beat HK Ajkule Ilidža in two straight games.
- 2014–15 — Blue Bulls Sarajevo finished first in the regular season and won the championship.
- 2015–16 — HK Ajkule Ilidža 2010 finished first in the regular season and won the championship.

=== Championships ===
Club	Titles	Years won
HK Stari Grad	3	2010, 2013, 2014
HK Bosna	2	2003, 2011
HK Ajkule Ilidža 2010	2	2012, 2016
Blue Bulls Sarajevo	1	2015

== See also ==
- Yugoslav Ice Hockey League
