= A kako ću ja =

Single by Lepa Brena

from the album Zar je važno dal se peva ili pjeva
- Released: July 21, 2018
- Studio: Grand Studio
- Genre: pop
- Length: 4:07
- Label: Grand Production
- Songwriter: Peđa Medenica
- Producers: Peđa Medenica; Endži Mavrić

Lepa Brena singles chronology
"Srećna žena" (2018)	"A kako ću ja" (2018)	"Odiseja ljubavi" (2019)

Music video
- "A kako ću ja" on YouTube

"A kako ću ja" is a song recorded by singer Lepa Brena, released on July 21, 2018, by Grand Production as the fifth single from her eighteenth studio album Zar je važno dal se peva ili pjeva (2018). The song and music was written by Peđa Medenica. "A kako ću ja" is a pop song. The music video was directed by Haris Dubica.

== Release and promotion ==
On July 6, 2018, Brena announced a new song "A kako ću ja", on her Instagram profile, and after that on YouTube with tizer for video.

== Music video ==
The video was filmed in Belgrade, Sarajevo, Thailand and Miami. In the video they acted: Ana Bavrka, Amil Šukalo, Afrodita Šukalo, Zahid Lagumdžić, Kanita Gojak, Enky Kučanin, Feđa Salihbegović, Maja Jašarević.
