= Kao nova =

Single by Lepa Brena

from the album Zar je važno dal se peva ili pjeva
- Released: February 21, 2018
- Studio: Grand Studio
- Genre: pop; folk
- Length: 3:30
- Label: Grand Production
- Songwriter: Dragan Brajović Braja
- Producers: Marko Cvetković; Dragan Brajović Braja

Lepa Brena singles chronology
"Boliš i ne prolaziš" (2017)	"Kao nova" (2018)	"Srećna žena" (2018)

Music video
- "Kao nova" on YouTube

"Kao nova" is a song recorded by singer Lepa Brena, released on February 21, 2018, by Grand Production as the third single from her eighteenth studio album Zar je važno dal se peva ili pjeva (2018). The song and music was written by Dragan Brajović Braja. "Kao nova" is a pop and folk song. The music video was directed by Haris Dubica.

== Release and promotion ==
On February 14, 2018, Brena announced a new song "Kao nova", in the "Posle ručka" on Happy TV. The video for the single was premiered on Brena's official YouTube channel.

== Music video ==
Lepa Brena has repeatedly said that she has been so blonde for so long that she can not imagine her with another hair color, and in the new video for the song "Kao nova" we can look like a redhead, which fits her perfectly. The singer commented that the red color for her has always been a symbol of love, passion and fire, and adds: "This time, this was our guiding idea when we wanted to introduce the new Lepa Brena. Of course, everyone is asking me whether this is now a new image and whether I will be Burning Flame in the future, so I will disappoint them. Redhead I was only for the needs of the video, I personally stay consistent with my blue hair color."
