= Odiseja ljubavi =

2019 single by Lepa Brena

Single by Lepa Brena
- Released: November 6, 2019
- Genre: Pop
- Length: 3:14
- Label: Grand Production
- Songwriter: Milan Miletić
- Producers: Milan Miletić; Saša Nikolić

Lepa Brena singles chronology
"A kako ću ja" (2018)	"Odiseja ljubavi" (2019)

Music video
- "Odiseja ljubavi" on YouTube

"Odiseja ljubavi" is a song recorded by singer Lepa Brena. It was released as a stand-alone single on November 6, 2019, along with its music video, by Grand Production. The song and music was written by Milan Miletić.

== Development and release ==
On October 18, 2019, Brena revealed that she had recorded a new song "Odiseja ljubavi" and as well the video. The video was filmed for a few days and the Brena changed a few stylings and hairstyles. What is particularly interesting is that the singer had a hat that was one meter in diameter and made of 60 feet of ostrich feathers for the purpose of recording. It was this detail that made the recording a problem. When Brena had to enter in the studio, she could not walk through the door, so the masters had to open another part of the studio for the singer that she could enter. "I really felt wonderful on the set, this will be something different from me and I am sure that I will positively surprise my audience" - said Brena about the video and track “Odiseja ljubavi”. The singer revealed to the media that she recorded the song thanks to her daughter-in-law, Aleksandra Prijović, who recognized on first listening that Brena is the only one who could best convey the emotion that the song carries.

== Composition ==
"This song is dedicated to all people who love, who appreciate and recognize love. This is what motivates, drives and sustains us in life. It is especially intended for women, mothers, grandmothers, to support them of their values and their existence in our lives", Brena said.

== Music video ==
The video was filmed in studio "Zepter" in Belgrade, directed by Igor Kušić. Assembly and post-production worked Nenad Mladenović, styling Stefan orlić, make up Srđan Petković.
