= Boliš i ne prolaziš =

- Itunes digital single cover

Single by Lepa Brena

from the album Zar je važno dal se peva ili pjeva
- Released: December 28, 2017
- Studio: Grand Studio
- Genre: pop
- Length: 3:44
- Label: Grand Production
- Songwriters: Filip Žvojinović; Dragan Brajović Braja
- Producers: Dejan Abadić; Filip Žvojinović; Dragan Brajović Braja

Lepa Brena singles chronology
"Zar je važno da l' se peva ili pjeva" (2017)	"Boliš i ne prolaziš" (2017)	"Kao nova" (2018)

Music video
- "Boliš i ne prolaziš" on YouTube

"Boliš i ne prolaziš" is a song recorded by singer Lepa Brena, released on December 28, 2017, by Grand Production as the second single from her eighteenth studio album Zar je važno dal se peva ili pjeva (2018). The song and music was written by Filip Živojinović and Dragan Brajović Braja. "Boliš i ne prolaziš" is a pop song. The music video was directed by Haris Dubica.

== Release and promotion ==
On December 21, 2017, Brena announced a new song "Boliš i ne prolaziš", in the "Dan uživo" on the N1 TV. The video for the single was premiered in Grand Production studio and then appeared on YouTube on the Brena's official channel. A documentary film Lepa Brena: Godine Slatkog greha was also held alongside the video "Boliš i ne prolaziš". "Video has worked for me now a new magician, a man who magically shoots videos and turns all my emotions and desires into one divine image, which is Haris Dubica", said Lepa Brena.

== Background ==
Filip Živojinović began to write the song a couple of years ago, but he did not finish it. Brena found this song in their house, liked her very much, and asked him to finish it because she wanted to record it. With the help of Dragan Brajović Braja, Filip finished the song, the pop ballade "Boliš i ne prolaziš".

== Music video ==
In the video "Boliš i ne prolaziš", young Bosnian actors Rijad Gvozden from Gornji Vakuf and Darja Badnjević from Bihać appear in the main roles.

The video was filmed for two days in Belgrade, and in five minutes, the unhappy love story of the couple played by Rijad and Darja was described. Given the fact that the video shows their entire life, in order to "conjure up" the age of these two people, Nenad Gajić and Katarina Bugarski Gajić, famous masks who were also engaged in the show Tvoje lice zvuči poznato. "I thank Lepa Brena for the artistic freedom she has enabled me, and I am also delighted with Rijad and Daria, I think they are extremely talented people. I had the opportunity to cooperate with Rijad again on other projects and I am honored that the cooperation is vindicated. both of these young actors to make excellent careers. Let's not forget the mentioned and supporting roles in the video played by Violeta Bojić, Aleksandar Dragić and Slaviša Repac, who have contributed greatly to the whole project, it is a great responsibility, but also a challenge to work for such a great star. I'm looking forward to already seeing the video we are currently working on, so you can expect it already at the end of January and it will be completely different, " - said director Haris Dubica.
