= Jaroslav Jandourek Cup =

The Jaroslav Jandourek Cup is the national ice hockey cup located in Bosnia and Herzegovina. It has been held since 2010, and is named after the HK Bosna coach, Jaroslav Jandourek.

== Champions ==
- 2010: HK Bosna
- 2011: HK Ilidža 2010
- 2012: HK Alfa
