= Imam pesmu da vam pevam Tour =

2024–2026 concert tour by Lepa Brena

- Tour by Lepa Brena
- Promotional poster for concert in Sarajevo at Zetra Olympic Hall, April 2024
- Location: Europe
- Associated albums: All of Brena’s studio albums
- Start date: April 20, 2024
- Legs: 1
- No. of shows: 35

Lepa Brena concert chronology
- Zar je važno da l' se peva ili pjeva... World Tour (2017–22); Imam pesmu da vam pevam Tour (2024-26)

Imam pesmu da vam pevam Tour is the sixth headlining concert tour by Yugoslav singer Lepa Brena. It was launched to support all of Brena's studio albums conceptually. The tour commenced on 20 April 2024, in Sarajevo, Bosnia and Herzegovina, at the Zetra Olympic Hall.

== Background ==
The Imam pesmu da vam pevam Tour represents a series of concerts announced by the legendary Yugoslav pop-folk star Lepa Brena. This tour marks her return to the regional music scene with a series of spectacular performances.

The tour kicked off with two spectacular concerts in Sarajevo, Bosnia and Herzegovina, at the packed Zetra Hall. Sarajevo, known for its rich cultural heritage and hospitality, was the perfect place to kick off this tour. Brena, with her charm, energy, and unparalleled vocals, won the hearts of fans who came from all corners of the region.

After Sarajevo, the tour continued to Montenegro, where the next concert would be held at the Morača Sports Center in Podgorica. This concert represented a unique opportunity for the audience in Montenegro to enjoy the performance of one of the greatest pop-folk icons of the Balkans.

After Podgorica, Brena announced concerts in cities such as Prijedor, Drvar, Mostar, Zenica, and Tuzla, which will further enrich this grand Balkan tour. It is expected that the audience in these cities will welcome Brena and enjoy her hits.

Although the current last part of the tour consists of a series of concerts in Zagreb, Croatia, at the Zagreb Arena, it is expected that Brena will announce new dates and cities as the tour progresses.

The Imam pesmu da vam pevam Tour shows that the popularity of Lepa Brena knows no bounds and that her music is still loved throughout the Balkans.

== Accident during the third concert at the Zagreb Arena ==
Lepa Brena suffered a broken ankle during her third concert at the Zagreb Arena on Monday night. Despite the injury, she performed until the end of the concert and later spent the night at the Draškovićeva Clinic for Traumatology.

The accident occurred during the performance. Ana Bekuta had just finished her set, and the next block of songs was about to begin. Brena was waiting in the lift to be raised onto the stage when a cameraman, who was filming an aerial artist performing with silk, walked backward and fell into the lift where the singer was standing.

Despite the broken ankle, Brena showed no signs of pain as she sang "Pazi kome zavidiš." Following the incident, the organizers issued a statement confirming the postponement of the final two concerts in Zagreb.

Official Statement from the Organizers:

Dear All,

We would like to inform the public that during last night’s third concert by Lepa Brena in Arena Zagreb, an unfortunate incident occurred, requiring the beloved regional star to undergo ankle surgery this morning. The operation was successful, and the singer is feeling well.

The incident happened when a member of the technical team accidentally fell from the stage into a lowered lift, sustaining minor injuries, just as Lepa Brena was waiting for her entrance to the audience. Unfortunately, the fall resulted in an injury to the singer. Despite the immense pain, Lepa Brena once again demonstrated remarkable professionalism, flawlessly completing the demanding concert, driven by the audience’s euphoria and her determination not to disappoint her fans. This courageous act is yet another testament to her greatness, dedication to music, and love for her audience.

In light of the recovery process and upon medical advice, the scheduled concerts on December 10 and December 16 in Arena Zagreb have been postponed.

Purchased tickets will remain valid for the rescheduled dates, which will be announced later. For those unable to attend the new dates, a full refund will be issued.

On behalf of Lepa Brena, her team, and the organizers, we thank you for your understanding and support!

== Shows ==
List of concerts, showing date, city, country, venue, opening acts, tickets sold, number of available tickets and amount of gross revenue
Date	City	Country	Venue	Guests	Attendance
Europe – Leg 1
April 20, 2024	Sarajevo	Bosnia and Herzegovina	Zetra Olympic Hall	Ana Bekuta; Senidah; Milica Todorović	32,000
April 21, 2024	Sarajevo	Bosnia and Herzegovina	Zetra Olympic Hall	Ana Bekuta; Senidah; Milica Todorović	32,000
May 25, 2024	Podgorica	Montenegro	Morača Sports Center	Branislav Mojićević; Sanja Đorđević	6,000
July 20, 2024	Drvar	Bosnia and Herzegovina	Sports Stadium	Viki Miljković; Nermin Handžić; Antonija Čerkez	10,000
July 26, 2024	Aranđelovac	Serbia	Šamotov Stadium	—N/a	7,000
August 10, 2024	Brčko	Bosnia and Herzegovina	Muzička Arena	Marko Gačić; Stevan Anđelković	6,000
November 6, 2024	Sofia	Bulgaria	National Palace of Culture	Reni	3.380
November 16, 2024	Tuzla	Bosnia and Herzegovina	Dvorana Mejdan	Bojan Vasković; Maid Hećimović; Slađana Mandić	8,000
December 6, 2024	Zagreb	Croatia	Arena Zagreb	Milica Todorović; Dragana Mirković; Bojan Vasković; Lana Kos	60,000
December 7, 2024	Zagreb	Croatia	Arena Zagreb	Dejan Petrović Big Band; Željko Joksimović; Goran Karan	60,000
December 9, 2024 (Note: During this concert, a cameraman accidentally fell on Lepa Brena while she was waiting in the lift to go on stage, breaking her ankle in the process. Despite the injury, Brena went on to perform and completed the concert.)	Zagreb	Croatia	Arena Zagreb	Ana Bekuta; Senidah; Saša Matić	60,000
February 14, 2025	Offenbach am Main	Germany	Stadthalle Offenbach	—N/a	8,000
February 15, 2025	Offenbach am Main	Germany	Stadthalle Offenbach	—N/a	8,000
February 22, 2025	Schwaz	Austria	SZentrum	—N/a	1,200
March 8, 2025 (Note: Brena dedicated this concert to her long-time friend, godfather, and collaborator Saša Popović, who passed away seven days before the concert. As she told the media, this was one of the hardest concerts of her career, as she started crying several times during the performance.)	Ljubljana	Slovenia	Arena Stožice	Dara Bubamara; Senidah; Maid Hećimović	14,000
March 21, 2025 (Note: The March 21 and 22, 2025, concerts in Zagreb were originally scheduled for December 10 and 16, 2024, but was rescheduled due to the incident during Lepa Brena's third concert, where a cameraman fell on her and broke her ankle.)	Zagreb	Croatia	Arena Zagreb	Nikola Rokvić; Ana Bekuta; Sanja Đorđević	40,000
March 22, 2025	Zagreb	Croatia	Arena Zagreb	Tanja Savić; Marija Mikić; Nikola Rokvić	40,000
July 25, 2025	Doboj	Bosnia and Herzegovina	Rukometni Stadion	—N/a	6,000
August 1, 2025	Ohrid	North Macedonia	Stadium Biljanini Izvori	Saša Kovačević	20,000
August 16, 2025	Trebinje	Bosnia and Herzegovina	Poligon Grad Sunca	Minja Mirković	5,000
October 17, 2025	Oslo	Norway	Samfunnssalen	—N/a	1,000
October 31, 2025	Zenica	Bosnia and Herzegovina	Arena Zenica	Minja Mirković; Maid Hećimović	10,000
November 29, 2025	Ludwigsburg	Germany	MHPArena	—N/a	6,200
December 5, 2025	Banja Luka	Bosnia and Herzegovina	Sports Hall Borik	Minja Mirković; Aleksa Perović	5,000
February 27, 2026	Jahorina	Bosnia and Herzegovina	Hotel Vučko	—N/a	2,000
February 28, 2026	Jahorina	Bosnia and Herzegovina	Hotel Vučko	—N/a	2,000
March 20, 2026	Banja Luka	Bosnia and Herzegovina	Sports Hall Borik	Anja Mihajlović; Aleksa Perović; Nucci	5,000
April 4, 2026	Tuzla	Bosnia and Herzegovina	Dvorana Mejdan	Maid Hećimović	8,000
April 18, 2026	Vienna	Austria	Multiversum Schwechat	—N/a	2,500
April 25, 2026	Oberhausen	Germany	Turbinenhalle	—N/a	3,500
July 25, 2026	Malinska	Croatia	Diamond Powered By Mint	—N/a	2,000
August 5, 2026	Budva	Montenegro	Top Hill	—N/a	5,000
August 20, 2026	Mostar	Bosnia and Herzegovina	Stadion Kantarevac	—N/a	—
August 29, 2026	Kriva Palanka	North Macedonia	City Stadium	—N/a	—
September 26, 2026	Sofia	Bulgaria	Arena Sofia	—	—
Total					—
