= HK Medvjedi =

- City: Novo Sarajevo
- League: Bosnia and Herzegovina Hockey League
- Founded: 2003; 23 years ago
- Home arena: Olympic Hall Zetra
- Colours

HK Medvjedi, previously HK Alfa, is a professional ice hockey club from Sarajevo, Bosnia. The club was founded in 2003 and plays in the Bosnia and Herzegovina Hockey League.

== History ==
HK Alfa was founded in 2003 but did not enter an active league until 2009 when they joined the Bosnia and Herzegovina Hockey League which had returned after a six year hiatus. HK Alfa finished the 2009–10 regular season in last place, winning only three of their ten games. During the season the team played under the name of Medvjedi iz Novog Sarajeva. The following season HK Alfa improved their performance after finishing second in the 2010–11 regular season and qualified for the best of three playoff with HK Bosna who finished in first place. HK Alfa lost the playoff over two games, with HK Bosna going on to win their second league title. During the 2010–11 season HK Alfa also competed in the Jaroslav Jandourek Cup. Alfa was drawn against HK Ilidža 2010 for the first game. Alfa lost the game 3–6 and were knocked out of the competition. For the start of the 2011–12 season HK Alfa continued the use of playing under a nickname, this season playing as HK Medvjedi.

== Season by season record ==
Bosnia and Herzegovina Hockey League

Season	GP	W	SOW	SOL	L	GF	GA	PTS	Finish	Playoff
2009–10	10	3	0	2	5	21	29	11	3rd	Did not qualify
2010–11	15	7	2	1	5	53	51	26	2nd	Loss final series vs. HK Bosna, 0–2

Jaroslav Jandourek Cup

- 2011 Jaroslav Jandourek Cup — Lost semi-final 3–6 vs. HK Ajkule Ilidža 2010
