= Aleksandra Prijović =

Serbian singer (born 1995)

- Александра Пријовић
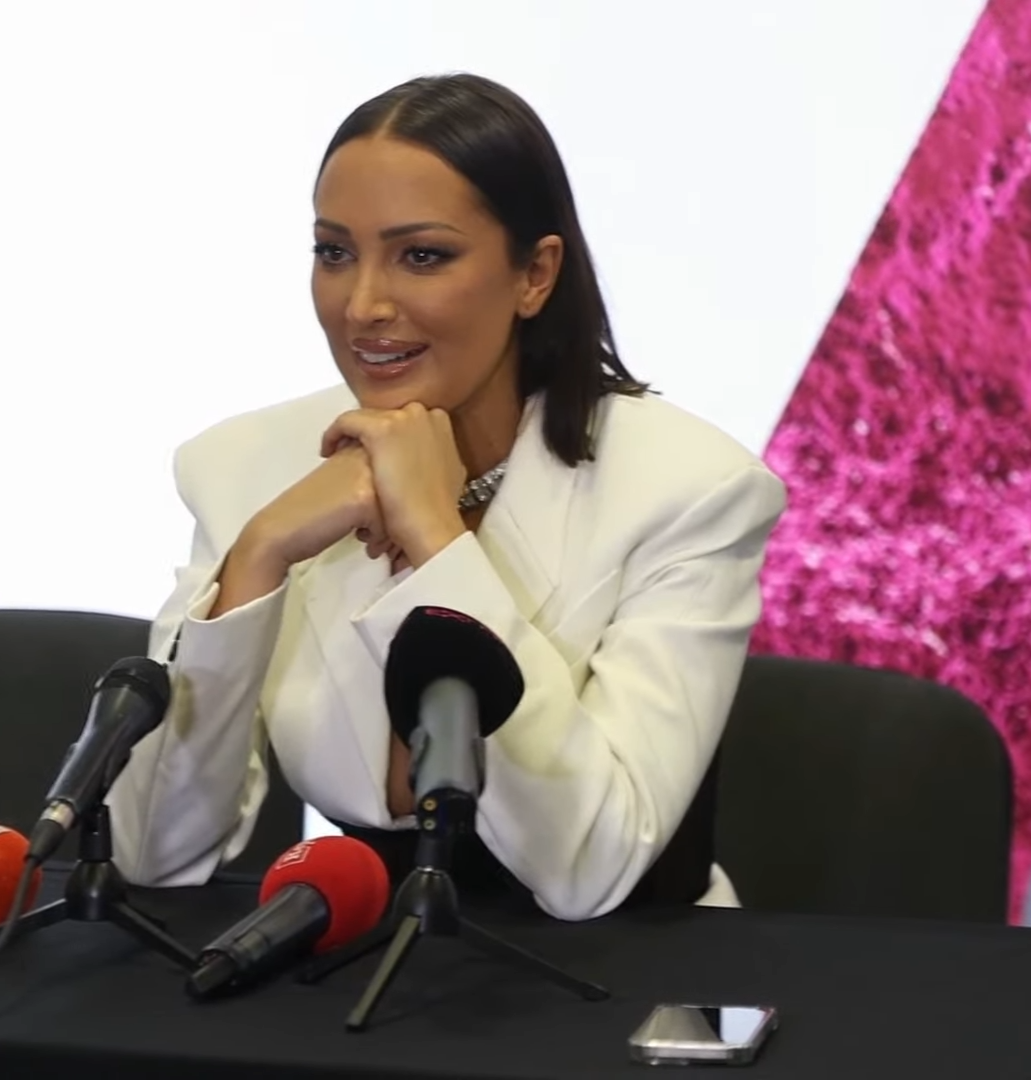
- Prijović in 2023
- Born: 22 September 1995 (age 31); Sombor, Serbia, FR Yugoslavia
- Other name: Aleksandra Živojinović
- Occupations: Singer; actress
- Years active: 2009–present
- Height: 1.70 m (5 ft 7 in)
- Spouse: Filip Živojinović (m. 2018)
- Children: 2
- Relatives: Slobodan Živojinović (father-in-law); Lepa Brena (stepmother-in-law)
- Musical career
- Origin: Beli Manastir, Croatia
- Genres: Pop-folk; turbo-folk; Balkan folk; pop
- Instruments: Vocals
- Works: Discography; filmography
- Labels: Gold Audio Video; Grand Production; A Music
- Website: aleksandraprijovic.rs

Aleksandra Živojinović (Serbian Cyrillic: Александра Живојиновић; born 22 September 1995), professionally known by her maiden name Aleksandra Prijović (Serbian Cyrillic: Александра Пријовић), is a Serbian singer. Dubbed the "only folk diva of the new generation" by Index.hr, she rose to prominence after placing fourth in the reality television singing competition Zvezde Granda.

== Life and career ==
=== 1995–2010: Early life and childhood ===
Aleksandra Prijović was born 22 September 1995 in Sombor, Serbia, to Borka Mihajlović and Nedeljko Prijović. At the age of three, she moved with her mother to Beli Manastir, Croatia following her parents' divorce. As a child, she showed a talent for singing. She performed at school performances and social events. Her ambition to become a professional singer caused her to be ridiculed by her classmates. At the age of thirteen, she recorded two songs, "Majko" and "Boli svaka tvoja reč", for the production company Mega Sound, whose owner was Mića Nikolić.

=== 2011–2018: Career beginnings and initial success ===
In 2013, Prijović participated in the Serbian singing competition show Zvezde Granda, where she finished in fourth place. After the show, Prijović released her debut song with the Grand Production record label, called "Još večeras plakaću za tobom". In June 2013, she also recorded the duet "Ma pusti ponos" with the winner of the season, Amar Jašarspahić. In January 2015, she achieved great success with the song "Za nas kasno je", which accumulated over 80 million views on YouTube. On 22 December 2015, she released the duet "Šta bi" with Serbian rapper MC Stojan. On 31 May 2016, she released the song "Totalna anestezija", which achieved exceptional success and surpassed 66 million views on YouTube. On 25 October 2016, she released the song "Senke". The song was viewed the record-breaking one million times within the first 24 hours.

In February 2017, Prijović released song "Uspomene", whose music video was recorded in black-and-white format. In April 2017, she released the song "Litar vina, litar krvi" in a duet with Aco Pejović. On 9 June 2017, she released two songs, "Telo" and "Sledeća", from her debut studio album. On 13 June 2017, she release two more songs, "Klizav pod" and "Separe", from her debut album. The "Separe" music video was temporarily removed from YouTube due to its explicit scenes and BDSM elements. She released "Mesto zločina" and "Voljena greško" on 16 June 2017. Prijović released her debut studio album Testament on 25 July 2017, under the Grand Production label. The title track, which was released on 6 June 2017, served as the lead single. The media claimed that, with the album, Prijović's style grew more and more reminiscent of that of turbo-folk star Ceca.

Prijović collaborated with Saša Matić on "Ko si ti", which was released on 25 May 2018. "Ko si ti" became one of the biggest pop-folk hits in Balkans and to this day, the song counting over 110 million views on YouTube.

=== 2019–present: Zvuk tišine and Devet života ===
After a short hiatus due to her pregnancy, Prijović came back to the stage with the release of "Neponovljivo" on 1 June 2019. Prijović released "Bogata sirotinja" on 21 June 2019 as the second single from her second studio album. In March 2020, she got a recurring role in several episodes of the fourth season of the television series My Father's Murderers. Prijović also recorded "Duguješ mi dva života", which was released on 28 February 2020, as the series main soundtrack. On 22 September 2020, Prijović released "Legitimno" as the third single from her second studio album. "Legitimno" accumulated over 60 million views on YouTube. She founded her own music label A Music, under which she released her second studio album, Zvuk tišine, on 21 July 2022. The album achieved major commercial success in Serbia and in the former Yugoslav region. Almost all tracks from the album became hits and the total number of YouTube views surpassed 100 million. Zvuk tišine contained twelve new tracks. The tracks "Sabotiram" and "Ja sam odlično" reached number ten, while "Javno mesto" and "Marš" simultaneously reached the top-25 on Billboard's newly established Croatia Songs chart.

Prijović performing at Top Hill, in 2023

Prijović released "Kuća strave" on 22 June 2023, as the lead single from her third studio album Devet života. The album charted in Austria and Switzerland, while the track "Dam dam dam" topped the Billboard Croatia Songs chart. In support of the album, she embarked on her debut headlining tour and her debut arena tour, Od Istoka Do Zapada Tour. The tour visited major cities in the former Yugoslav region, starting with three concerts at Štark Arena in Belgrade, Serbia over 28–30 September 2023. She also sold out five concerts at Arena Zagreb, making her the only artist who managed to achieve that, beating Dino Merlin who managed to sell out four. At the same time, she is the only singer who managed to sell out three concerts at the Zetra Olympic Hall in Sarajevo, and three concerts at Čair Hall in Niš. With Od Istoka Do Zapada Tour, Prijović broke several records, and became the first regional artist who managed to sell out several consecutive concerts at the biggest concert halls in all major cities, in a record time, in Southeast European countries. The tour has had a cultural impact in the region, and is considered as one of the biggest and most successful tours in the Balkans.

== Personal life ==
In 2016, Aleksandra started dating Filip Živojinović, the son of Serbian tennis player Slobodan Živojinović and the stepson of turbo-folk singer Lepa Brena. The couple got married on 21 June 2018, in Belgrade, Serbia, where they currently reside. Following her first pregnancy, Prijović took a short hiatus, and on 6 March 2019, she gave birth to her and Filip's first child, a son named Aleksandar. On 3 September 2025, Prijović gave birth the couple's second child, a daughter named Aria.

== Discography ==
- Testament (2017)
- Zvuk tišine (2022)
- Devet života (2023)
- Bol i alkohol (2026)

== Filmography ==
Television appearances
Year	Title	Role	Notes
2012–13	Zvezde Granda	Herself (contestant)	Season 7; 4th place
2020	My Father's Murderers	Mila	Season 4; recurring role

== Awards and nominations ==
List of awards and nominations of Aleksandra Prijović
Year	Award	Category	Nominee/work	Result	Ref.
2020	Music Awards Ceremony	Folk Song of the Year	"Bogata sirotinja"	Won	
2023	Music Awards Ceremony	Folk Song of the Year	"Zvuk tišine"	Won	

== Tours ==
- Od Istoka Do Zapada Tour (2023–24)
- Aleksandra Prijović Live 2026 (2026)
- Bol i Alkohol Stadium Tour (2027)
