= Zar je važno da l' se peva ili pjeva (song) =

- Itunes digital single cover

Single by Lepa Brena

from the album Zar je važno dal se peva ili pjeva
- Released: November 28, 2017
- Studio: Grand Studio
- Genre: folk; pop
- Length: 4:10
- Label: Grand Production
- Songwriter: Dragan Brajović Braja
- Producers: Marko Peruničić; Nebojša Arežina; Fadil Buturović; Dragan Brajović Braja

Lepa Brena singles chronology
"Carica" (2016)	"Zar je važno da l' se peva ili pjeva" (2017)	"Boliš i ne prolaziš" (2017)

Music video
- "Zar je važno da l' se peva ili pjeva" on YouTube

"Zar je važno da l' se peva ili pjeva" is a song recorded by singer Lepa Brena, released on November 28, 2017, by Grand Production as the lead single from her eighteenth studio album Zar je važno dal se peva ili pjeva (2018). The song and music was written by Dragan Brajović Braja. "Zar je važno da l' se peva ili pjeva" is a folk and pop song, with lyrics Brena used to convey to those from the republics of the former Yugoslavia that hate is unnecessary. The song received excellent reviews from music critics. The music video was directed by Haris Dubica.

== Release and promotion ==
On November 18, 2017, Brena announced a new song and album "Zar je važno da l' se peva ili pjeva", with teaser on YouTube. The spot for the single was premiered in Grand Production studio and then appeared on YouTube on the Brena's official channel. "The song talks about where we were, where we are now and where we should be in the future. Composer Dragan Brajović Braja succeeded in transferring my thoughts and emotions into one beautiful story. Raka Đokić's early departure left a great pain and emptiness in my heart. We celebrate 35 years of work and business show business and 30 years from the story Hajde da se volimo. Raka started a thread that has not been interrupted even today, and it will remain when one day I will not be dealing with this job" - said Brena, adding - "Playing in the films Tesna koža, Nema problema and Hajde da se volimo I became, so to speak, a dessert in every home during the holidays. I managed to persevere all these years and I would like to give my contribution to spreading love with music and this number. The song is something that does not have a passport, border, but flying like a pigeon that carries good and noble energy. My only task is to make people happy."

== Background ==
The idea of the song "Zar je važno da l' se peva ili pjeva" was created a year ago, and "the main culprit" is Brena's husband, Slobodan Živojinović, who persuaded her to make this song. "I was expecting songs in pop manner and, I really did not like it. Boba told me that if I do not want to record it, that would be his song, so he is a creative leader. It's good to have a creative partner next to yourself, like Boba" - said Brena and adding "With this remarkable song, I announce the beginning of a major world tour, we are expecting over 60 concerts in halls from Australia across Europe to America and Canada. The crown of everything will be an exclusive documentary in which the audience will first see many unpublished footage from my previous career, and we are also thinking about the fourth part of the movie "Hajde da se volimo"."

== Music video ==
The video was filmed in Zagreb, Sarajevo and Belgrade, and was directed by Haris Dubica. Members of Slatki Greh and actors Nikola Kojo, Saša Petrović, Enis Bešlagić, Emir Hadžihafizbegović and Dragan Bjelogrlić appear in the video.

== Personnel ==
=== Crew ===
- Arranged By – Marko Peruničić, Nebojša Arežina
- Arranged By, Accordion – Fadil Buturović
- Backing Vocals – Ksenija Milošević
- Bass – Miroslav Tovirac
- Guitar – Mustafa Behmen
- Music By, Lyrics By – Dragan Brajović
- Percussion – Marko Louis*
- Producer – Atelje Trag
- Violin – Zoran Kovačević
