= Srećna žena =

Single by Lepa Brena

from the album Zar je važno dal se peva ili pjeva
- Released: February 28, 2018
- Studio: Grand Studio
- Genre: pop
- Length: 3:19
- Label: Grand Production
- Songwriter: Marina Tucaković
- Producer: Atelje Trag

Lepa Brena singles chronology
"Kao nova" (2018)	"Srećna žena" (2018)	"A kako ću ja" (2018)

Music video
- "Srećna žena" on YouTube

"Srećna žena" is a song recorded by singer Lepa Brena, released on February 28, 2018, by Grand Production as the fourth single from her eighteenth studio album Zar je važno dal se peva ili pjeva (2018). The song was written by Marina Tucaković, and music by Marko Peruničić and Nebojša Arežina. "Srećna žena" is a pop song. The music video was directed by Haris Dubica.

== Release and promotion ==
On February 27, 2018, Brena announced a new song "Srećna žena", on YouTube with teaser from making of video. The video for the single was premiered on the Brena's official YouTube channel.

== Music video ==
In the video, of director Haris Dubica, there are 13 attractive singers, and they are all the same stylized, in white coats, with blonde wigs and red caps on their heads, so at first it's hard to guess which of them is Lepa Brena. "We invited 13 most beautiful singers and actors to participate in the video and from their hearts, thanking them for having set aside time to record, in addition to their obligations. It looks like I have great support from younger generation, and that makes me very happy" - says the pop-folk legend, Lepa Brena. One of the most expensive video's in Brena's career was filmed in Istanbul, London, New York City, Belgrade, Switzerland and the Maldives. In the video they appear: Goca Tržan, Tijana Dapčević, Anabela, Katarina Živković, Vesna Đogani, Edita Aradinović, Nikolina Kovač, Ljupka Stević, Slađana Mandić, Vanja Mijatović, Tamara Dragić, Dženita Alić, Maida Mehmedović, Sandra Šljivar, Narcisa Dubica, Sabrina Čizmo, Emina Biščević, Jelena Jovičić, Arnela Redžepagić, Katarina Orestijević, Amela Šljivar, Ermina Hafizović, Sara Huremović and Dance club Evolution.
