= HK Jahorina =

- City: Pale, Bosnia and Herzegovina
- League: BiH Hockey League
- Founded: 2002

Franchise history
- 2002–2003: HK Jahorina

HK Jahorina was an ice hockey team in Pale, Bosnia and Herzegovina. The team was founded in 2002, and played in the Bosnia and Herzegovina Hockey League in the 2002-03 season. The club folded after its inaugural season in the BHHL.

== Results ==
Season	GP	GF	GA	P	Finish	Playoffs
2002-03	16	62	117	12	3rd	Did not qualify
