= HK Šampion =

- City: Sarajevo, Bosnia and Herzegovina
- League: BiH Hockey League
- Founded: 2002

Franchise history
- 2002–2003: HK Šampion

HK Šampion was an ice hockey team in Sarajevo, Bosnia and Herzegovina. Šampion was founded in 2002, and played in the Bosnia and Herzegovina Hockey League in the 2002-03 season, finishing in fourth and last place. The club folded after playing one season in the BHHL.

== Results ==
Season	GP	GF	GA	P	Finish	Playoffs
2002-03	16	49	150	8	4th	Did not qualify
