= IX života =

2023 studio album by Aleksandra Prijović

Devet života

Studio album by Aleksandra Prijović
- Released: 26 June 2023
- Genre: Pop-folk
- Length: 30:58
- Language: Serbian
- Label: A Music
- Producer: Dejan Kostić; Saša Milošević; Bojan Vasić

Aleksandra Prijović chronology
Zvuk tišine (2022)	Devet života (2023)	Bol i alkohol (2026)

Singles from Devet života
- 1. "Kuća strave" Released: 22 June 2023

Devet života (Serbian Cyrillic: Девет живота, lit. 'Nine Lives'; stylized as IX života) is the third studio album by Serbian singer Aleksandra Prijović. It was released on digital platforms independently through A Music on 26 June 2023. The album succeeded Zvuk tišine from 2022. Devet života was announced with the release of its lead single "Kuća strave" on 22 June.

The album features nine tracks, five of which were produced by Dejan Kostić, alongside Saša Milošević, Miloš Roganović, and Bojan Vasić. Prijović's husband, Filip Živojinović, was also involved as a songwriter alongside Dragan Brajović, Marinko Stambolija and Aleksandar Tomić. Every song from the album is supported by a music video.

Devet života saw commercial success. It debuted on the official charts in Austria and Switzerland. The track "Dam dam dam" also peaked a top of Billboard's Croatia Songs chart. The album was supported by Prijović's first regional headlining tour, entitled Od Istoka Do Zapada Tour.

== Track listing ==
Devet života track listing
No.	Title	Lyrics	Music	Arrangement	Length
1.	"Devet života"	Filip Živojinović	Živojinović	Saša Milošević	4:07
2.	"Dam dam dam"	Dragan Brajović	Dejan Kostić	Kostić	2:44
3.	"Placebo"	Miloš Roganović	Roganović	Roganović	3:19
4.	"Psiho"	Brajović	Brajović; Kostić	Kostić	3:17
5.	"Kuća strave"	Živojinović	Živojinović	Kostić	3:34
6.	"Prvi si počeo"	Živojinović	Živojinović; Kostić	Kostić	2:45
7.	"Ludnica" (with Dejan Kostić)	Marinko Stambolija	Kostić	Kostić	4:38
8.	"Zver"	Aleksandar Tomić; Bojan Vasić	Vasić	Vasić	2:40
9.	"Sve po starom"	Živojinović	Živojinović	Milošević	3:50
Total length:					30:58

== Personnel ==
Musicians

- Aleksandra Prijović - lead vocals
- Ivana Selakov - backing vocals (3)
- Petar Trumbetaš - bouzouki, guitar (3)
- Miloš Roganović - electric guitar, keyboards, bass (3)
- Dušan Alagić - piano (3)

Technical

- Saša Milošević - production (1, 9)
- Dejan Kostić - production (2, 4, 5, 6, 7)
- Miloš Roganović - programming, production and mixing (3)
- Marko Đurašević - mixing, editing (3)
- Bojan Vasić - production (3)

== Charts ==
Chart performance for Devet života
Chart (2023)	Peak position
Austrian Albums (Ö3 Austria)	31
Swiss Albums (Schweizer Hitparade)	52

== Release history ==
Release history for IX života
Region	Date	Format	Label	Ref.
Various	26 June 2023	Digital download; streaming	A Music	
