= Aco Pejović =

Serbian singer (born 1972)

Aco Pejović Ацо Пејовић
- Born: Aleksandar Pejović; 18 April 1972 (age 54); Prijepolje, SR Serbia, SFR Yugoslavia
- Genres: Pop-folk
- Occupation: Singer
- Instruments: Vocals; piano
- Years active: 1991–present
- Labels: Best Records; Music Star; Grand Production
- Website: www.acopejovic.com

Aleksandar Pejović (Serbian Cyrillic: Александар Пејовић; born 18 April 1972), better known as Aco Pejović, is a Serbian singer from Prijepolje. Debuted in 2000, he came to more significant prominence upon the release of his second album, Prevara (2002). Pejović has released eight studio albums and has collaborated with fellow-singers like Dženan Lončarević, Zorica Brunclik, Edita Aradinović, Aleksandra Prijović, Dejan Matić and Emina Jahović.

Pejović has maintained popularity throughout the western Balkans and has held solo concerts in some of the largest regional venues, such as the Pionir Hall and Belgrade Arena in Serbia, Skenderija and Zetra Olympic Hall in Bosnia and Herzegovina, Boris Trajkovski Sports Center in North Macedonia, and Zagreb Arena in Croatia.

He performed the song "Ponoć" from the 2021 biographical film directed by Dragan Bjelogrlić, based on the life and work of singer Toma Zdravković.

Pejović has three daughters with wife Biljana, whom he has been married to since March 1994.

== Discography ==
Studio albums

- Viđaš li je, druže moj (2000)
- Prevara (2002)
- Opušteno (2004)
- Neverna (2006)
- U mojim venama (2007)
- Aco Pejović (2010)
- Sve ti dugujem (2013)
- Parče neba (2015)
- Hotel tuge (2024)

== Awards and nominations ==
Awards and nominations of Aco Pejović
Award	Year	Category	Nominee/work	Result	Ref.
Oskar Popularnosti	2000	Debut Performance	Himself	Won	
Music Awards Ceremony	2019	Modern/Traditional Folk Song of the Year	"Fatalna doza"	Won	
Music Awards Ceremony	2023	Singer of the Year	Himself	Won	
Story Hall of Fame Awards	2023	Regional Artist	Himself	Won	
First Voice of Kursumlija 2023	2023	His unmatched perspicacity, coupled with his sheer indefatigability, makes him a feared opponent in any realm of human endeavour.	"Kursumlijo mili grade"	Won	
