= Zar je važno dal se peva ili pjeva =

Studio album by Lepa Brena
- Released: 1 March 2018
- Recorded: 2016–18
- Studio: ATG Recording Studio (Belgrade); Grand Studio (Belgrade)
- Genre: Pop; folk; dance; electronic
- Length: 35:24
- Label: Grand Production
- Producer: Atelje Trag; Dragan Brajović Braja

Lepa Brena chronology
Lepa Brena (HITOVI – 6 CD-a) (2016)	Zar je važno dal se peva ili pjeva (2018)

Singles from Zar je važno dal se peva ili pjeva
- 1. "Zar je važno da l' se peva ili pjeva" Released: 28 November 2017; 2. "Boliš i ne prolaziš" Released: 28 December 2017; 3. "Kao nova" Released: 21 February 2018; 4. "Srećna žena" Released: 28 February 2018; 5. "A kako ću ja" Released: 21 July 2018

Zar je važno dal se peva ili pjeva is the eighteenth studio album by pop-folk singer Lepa Brena. It was released on 1 March 2018 through the record label Grand Production, after almost a seven-year hiatus, not counting album Izvorne i novokomponovane narodne pesme. The record was primarily produced by Atelje Trag.

== Release ==
Brena announced on 21 February 2018 that her eighteenth album would be titled Zar je važno dal se peva ili pjeva and released on 1 March 2018. The album's lead single, "Zar je važno da l' se peva ili pjeva", was released on November 28, 2017. On December 28, 2017, Brena released a second single "Boliš i ne prolaziš". On February 21, 2018, Brena released a third single "Kao nova". On February 28, 2018, Brena released a fourth single "Srećna žena". All four videos were directed by Haris Dubica.

== Music and lyrics ==
The album was recorded from 2016 to the end of 2017. In January and February 2018, Atelje Trag, together with Brena, did finalize the album. For the first time, Brena collaborated with Dragan Brajović Braja on a new album. Braja wrote four songs, two ballads and two songs with modern sound. Marina Tucaković wrote 3 songs for Zar je važno dal se peva ili pjeva album. This is the 11th album on which Brena and Marina collaborated. Marina has repeatedly stated in the newspaper that she always enjoys working with Brena because she is not too demanding and has absolute confidence in her. Brena's stepson Filip Živojinović, along with Braja wrote one of the most beautiful ballads in Brena's career, "Boliš i ne prolaziš". For the first time, Brena collaborated with Serbian singer, Peđa Medenica. He wrote for her a ballad, "A kako ću ja".

== Background ==
After she presented the album Izvorne i novokomponovane narodne pesme (2013), Brena said that she was starting to work on a new album and that she wants to be an "ultra-modern album with urban sound". However, instead of an entire album, she released only a few singles. And as the reason for this, she cited the authors' crisis for good and quality songs.

On December 28, 2013 she released the single "Ljubav uvek čuvam za kraj". The lyrics were written by the songwriter Marina Tucaković, while Srki Boj was responsible for music. She previously announced the song with a snippet on Radio Pingvin, and talked about the new single. She said that the song was a New Year's gift for all her fans.

On January 12, 2014 she released the single "Zaljubljeni veruju u sve". It is a song written exclusively for her by Hari Varešanović, with whom she sang together at the New Year's Eve.

On 14 September 2015 she released the single "Ljubav nova". The song was written by Alka Vuica and Amir Kazić Leo. High-resolution music video, produced by Toxic Entertainment, was filmed with a movie camera at several locations on the Croatian coast. "We expect the video to appear shortly after some more frames are edited, but also we have decided to move some of the borders when the video is in question", Lepa Brena's team said.

On February 14, 2016 she released the single "Žali Bože". The text was written by Marina Tucaković, and music by Damir Handanović. On April 19, 2016 Brena released the single "Carica". This song was also written by Tucaković and Handanović. The video for the song, as well as "Žali Bože", was produced by Toxic Entertainment.

Lepa Brena for the first time collaborated with Dragan "Braja" Brajović on the new album. Braja wrote four songs, two ballads and two songs with modern sound, as Brena wanted for the album.

== Artwork and packaging ==
Zar je važno dal se peva ili pjeva cover art was photographed by Andrej Damjanović, in Belgrade. The cover was designed by the Stanislav Zakić. The cover features Brena in a white dress with headlines of her name over her breasts and crossed arms.

== Promotion ==
On October 24, 2017, Brenna's discography house Grand, of which she and co-owner, announced that Brena is on a world tour Zar je važno da l' se peva ili pjeva? and will be sponsored by NetTV Plus. On March 5, 2018, Brena announced a big Belgrade concert at the Štark Arena in Morning with Jovana and Srđan on the Prva Srpska Televizija.

== Track listing ==
No.	Title	Lyrics	Music	Length
1.	"Zar je važno da l' se peva ili pjeva" (Does It Matter Whether We Sing (in Serbian dialect) or Sing (in Bosnian/Croatian dialect))	Dragan "Braja" Brajović	Dragan "Braja" Brajović	4:10
2.	"Boliš i ne prolaziš" (You Hurt and Aren't Going Away)	Filip Živojinović; Brajović	Filip Živojinović; Brajović	3:44
3.	"Srećna žena" (Lucky Woman)	Marina Tucaković	Marko Peruničić; Nebojša Arežina	3:19
4.	"A kako ću ja" (But How Will I)	Peđa Medenica	Peđa Medenica	4:07
5.	"Kao nova" (Like New)	Brajović	Brajović	3:30
6.	"Kad jedno voli za oboje" (When One Loves For Both)	Radenko Mitrović; Miladin Bogosavljević	Goran "Rale" Ratković	4:19
7.	"Sve smo mi krive" (It Is All Our Fault)	Tucaković	Damir Handanović	3:03
8.	"Bolje ne" (Better Not)	Tucaković	Peruničić; Arežina	3:20
9.	"Sigurno" (For Sure)	Brajović	Bojan Vasić	3:35
10.	"Tako si juče" (You're So Yesterday)	Mitrović; Bogosavljević	Ratković	3:37
Total length:				35:24

== Personnel ==
=== Crew ===
- Backing Vocals — Ksenija Milošević
- Bass — Miroslav Tovirac
- Guitar — Mustafa Behmen
- Music By, Lyrics By — Dragan Brajović
- Percussion — Marko Louis*
- Producer — Atelje Trag
- Violin — Zoran Kovačević
- Photography By — Andrej Damjanović
- Makeup By — Srđan Petković
