= Amar Jašarspahić =

Bosnian singer

Amar Gile
- Born: Amar Jašarspahić; December 13, 1990 (age 35); Kakanj, Yugoslavia
- Genre: Folk-pop
- Occupation: Singer
- Years active: 2013–present

Amar Jašarspahić (born 30 December 1990), better known as Amar Gile or simply Gile, is a Bosnian singer. He won the seventh season of music competition Zvezde Granda.

== Biography ==
Gile has been interested in music since his early childhood; his singing talent he inherited from his mother. He was the winner of the regional music competition Zvezde Granda. Since then, Gile has regularly filled arenas and clubs all throughout Europe, Australia, and the Americas. He went on several tours in the Balkans, Western Europe, Scandinavia, America, and Australia. Gile is an active philanthropist; he helps the children, the youth and the elderly who are in tough health and material situations. He is a UNICEF ambassador and uses the title to fight for the rights of children in the Balkan region.

Gile made his solo debut in 2013 with the album Čovjek tvoga sna in 2013. In 2015, he published two songs: "Trnje oko srca" and "Prekasno". The following year, Gile released two singles titled "Pijano" and "Imam samo jednu želju", the second of which features Bosnian actor Haris Burina. In 2017, he had great success with songs "Spreman na sve" and "Apokalipsa" (accompanied by an uncut music video). On 20 August 2025, Gile suffered an accident on the highway near Kakanj, leading his then-upcoming concert in Srebrenik to be canceled.

Gile has been married twice and is the father of two children.

== Discography ==
=== Albums ===
- Čovjek tvoga sna (2013)
  - "Čovjek tvoga sna"
  - "Kafana liječi sve"
  - "Koliko para toliko muzike"
  - "I ja sam nečije dijete"
  - "Krv mi je popila"
  - "Nije kraj"
  - "Ma pusti ponos"
  - "Ne prestaju moje kiše"
  - "Zašto sam sam"

=== Singles ===
- "Trnje oko srca" (2015)
- "Prekasno" (2015)
- "Pijano" (2016)
- "Imam samo jednu želju" (2016)
- "Spreman na sve" (2017)
- "Apokalipsa" (2017)
- "Ponekad" (duet with Jelena Kostov) (2018)
- "Promjena" (2018)
- "Nek’ to budem ja" (2019)
- "Sve što znaš o meni" (2019)
- "Boli boli" (duet with Ivana Selakov) (2020)

== Accolades ==
- Zvezde Granda Winner (2013)
- The discovery of the decade – Sarajevo (2013)
- Popularity Oscar – Singer of the year (2013)
- Gold Ladybug for best foreign singer in Macedonia (2014)
- Reward for the humanist of the year (2014)
- UNICEF title of the Ambassador of Good Will for BiH (2015)
- Reward in Zagreb for humanitarian work (2015)
- Reward in Skopje for humanity (2015)
- Reward in Skopje for best singer (2015)
- Reward "Davorin Popović" for best young singer (2015)
- UNICEF Ambassador – BiH, region of the Balkans and International representative (2015)
- Platinum plate – album Čovjek tvoga sna (2015)
- Humanity award for "Taking measures for education" (2015)
- Nation idol (Education builds BiH) (2015)
- Honorary citizen of Kakanj city (for promotion of the city and for the humanitarian work) (2015)
