= Bosnia and Herzegovina Ice Hockey Federation =

Ice hockey governing body of Bosnia and Herzegovina

Bosnia and Herzegovina
- Association name: Hokejaški savez Bosne i Hercegovine
- IIHF Code: BIH
- IIHF membership: May 10, 2001
- President: Adnan Korić
- IIHF men's ranking: 46

The Ice Hockey Association of Bosnia and Herzegovina (Serbo-Croatian: Hokejaški savez Bosne i Hercegovine; Хокејашки савез Босне и Херцеговине; HSBiH) is the governing body of ice hockey in Bosnia and Herzegovina. It is responsible for the Bosnia and Herzegovina Hockey League (BHL), men's, and women's and youth teams.
