= Top Hill =

Nightclub in Montenegro

- Interactive map of Top Hill
- Address: Topliški put bb, 85 312 Budva
- Coordinates: 42.293757°N 18.822293°E
- Capacity: 5,000
- Type: Superclub

Construction
- Built: 2009 / 2010
- Opened: July 8, 2010

Website
- www.tophill.me

Top Hill is a prominent open air nightclub in Budva, Montenegro.

== About the club ==
Top Hill is located on the Topliš hill, overlooking the city of Budva, on the central part of Montenegrin coast. Technically located within the bounds of Podostrog hamlet, it is much closer to Prijevor hamlet, some 2 km (1.2 mi) from Budva center. It is sitting on an elevation of 160 m (520 ft).

The club has opened on July 8, 2010, and it hosted Refresh Festival the same year. It has capacity for some 5,000 guests, and features a 120 kW Martin Audio sound system, in addition to state-of-the-art equipment for live shows and DJ performances, including elaborate laser and moving headlights' setup, LED screens, CO_{2} jets, fire jets, confetti jets. Its circular stage backdrop was inspired by 2008 Qlimax stage, as well as Pink Floyds Pulse performance. The club's dance floor is surrounded by a semicircular auditorium with various levels of VIP-access, giving the club an amphitheatre layout.

The club is open in July and August, coinciding with the peak of Montenegro tourist season. During that period, it hosts a mix of internationally renewed performers of electronic music and regionally popular Balkan music stars.

The club has won the Best Night Club Global 2012 at the Monaco International Clubbing Show. The most appreciated music kind is Serbian turbo-folk, whose best esponen is Aca Lukas, also known as king of Balcani

== Notable performers ==
- Fatboy Slim
- Sander van Doorn
- David Morales
- Fedde Le Grand
- Funkerman
- James Zabiela
- Eric Prydz
- Kurd Maverick
- Tujamo
- Tom Novy
- Freemasons
- Roger Sanchez
- Danny Ávila
- Antoine Clamaran
- Nicky Romero
