= HK Vukovi =

- City: Stari Grad, Sarajevo
- League: Bosnia and Herzegovina Hockey League
- Founded: 2002; 24 years ago
- Home arena: Olympic Hall Zetra
- Colours

HK Vukovi, previously HK Stari Grad, is a professional ice hockey club from Sarajevo, Bosnia and Herzegovina. The club was founded in 2002.

== Season by season record ==
- 2009-2010
