= Haris Dubica =

Bosnian-Swiss music video director

- Born: Lucerne, Switzerland

Haris Dubica is a Bosnian-Swiss music video director and book author.

== Biography ==
Dubica was born in Switzerland to Bosniak parents from Sanski Most, Bosnia and Herzegovina.

== Career ==
Dubica has worked with Dino Merlin, Mia Borisavljević, Mirza Malkoč, Saša Kovačević, Marija Šerifović, Šako Polumenta, Dado Polumenta, Emina Jahović, and Dženan Lončarević, among others. In 2011, he directed the video for the Maya Berović single "Djevojačko prezime" in his hometown Lucerne. Dubica directed several music videos for songs on Lepa Brena’s 2018 album ‘’Zar je važno dal se peva ili pjeva’’.
