= HK Bosna =

HK Bosna Lisice
- City: Sarajevo
- League: Yugoslav Ice Hockey League (1985–1988); Bosnia and Herzegovina Hockey League
- Founded: 1980; 46 years ago (as HK Bosna)
- Home arena: Juan Antonio Samaranch Olympic Hall
- Colours

HK Bosna Lisice Centar is a professional ice hockey club from central Sarajevo, Bosnia and Herzegovina. The club was founded in 1980, and is the most established hockey club in the country. The club is part of the University Sport Society USD Bosna (Bosnian: Univerzitetsko Sportsko Društvo Bosna).

== History ==
Historical logo

Plans to get hockey in Bosnia and Herzegovina go back to the 1950s. However, this was not to be until later. HK Bosna was established on September 11, 1980, though it was relatively weak, being defeated by HK Spartak 59–1 and by HK Skopje 28–2. The club was boosted by the Olympics held in 1984. That same year, on February 3, the club entered the top tier of the Yugoslav Hockey League. The team got its revenge against Spartak, winning by 3–2. Hockey became quite popular in Sarajevo, as home games gathered thousands of spectators. The club also brought in players from abroad. A notable win came against HK Olimpija, by 3–2 in front of some 8,000 fans. The success was short-lived, as the club fell into financial difficulties, resulting in its leaving of the league after the 1987–88 season. The club continued to exist thanks to the enthusiasm of a number of supporting players and fans.

The club and hockey in general in Bosnia and Herzegovina came into grim times in the 1990s due to the Bosnian War. In 1993 the home ice was destroyed. Thanks to HK Bosna, the BiH Ice Hockey Federation was formed that year. Zetra was rebuilt in 1998, and the club was quickly resurrected. Currently the club has both senior and junior sections.

== Honours ==
- Bosnia and Herzegovina Hockey League:
  - Winners (2) : 2003, 2011.

== Season by season record ==
=== Yugoslav Ice Hockey League ===
- 1985–1986 – 7th place
- 1986–1987 – 5th place
- 1987–1988 – 9th place

=== Bosnia-Herzegovina Hockey League ===
- 2002–2003 – 1st place
