= Juan Antonio Samaranch Olympic Hall =

Indoor arena in Sarajevo, Bosnia and Herzegovina

- Zetra

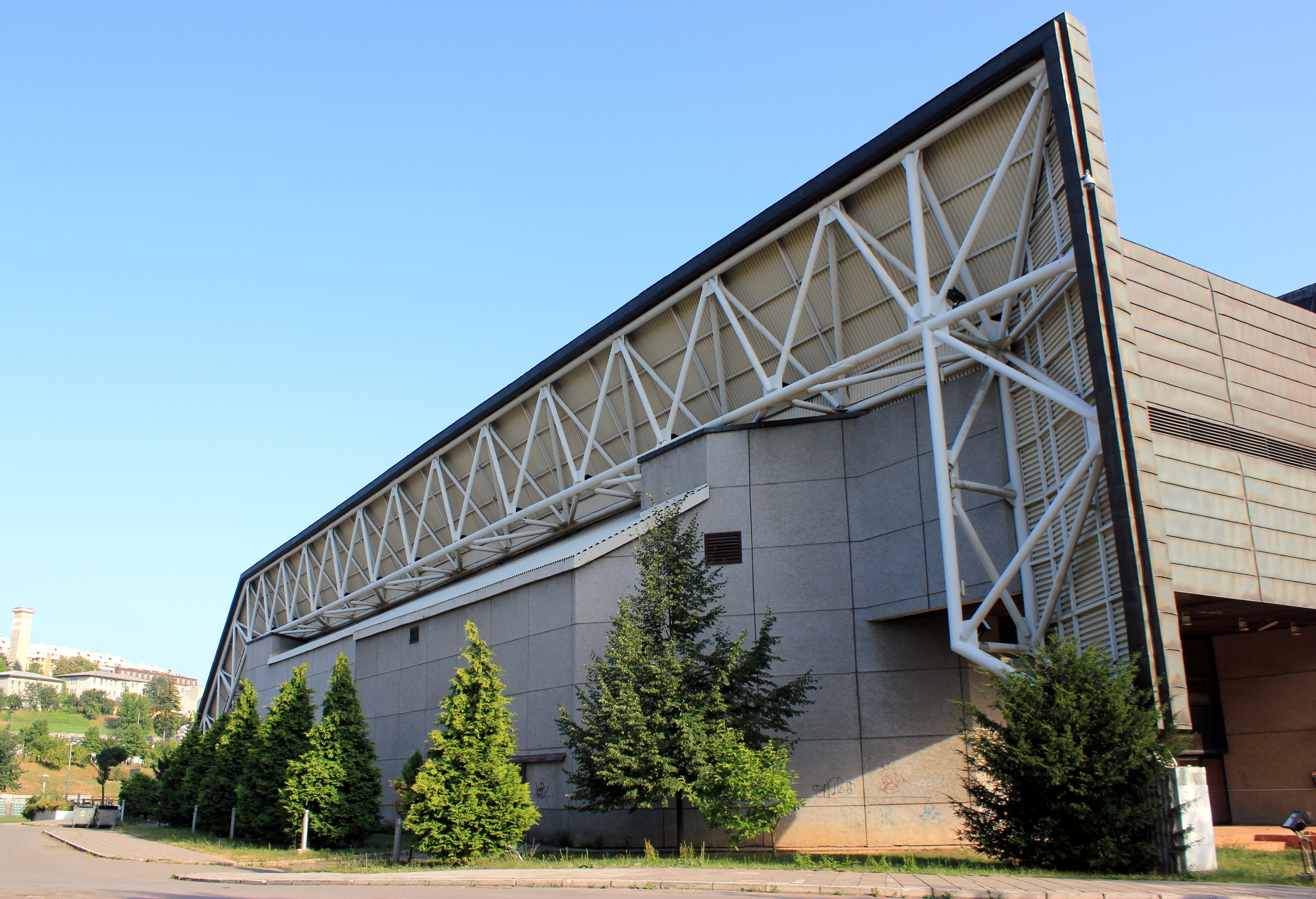
- Juan Antonio Samaranch Olympic Hall in August 2015
- Interactive map of Juan Antonio Samaranch Olympic Hall
- Former names: Zetra Olympic Hall
- Location: Alipašina, Koševo, Centar, Sarajevo, Bosnia and Herzegovina
- Coordinates: 43°52′18.5″N 18°24′34.4″E
- Owner: Sarajevo Canton
- Operator: ZOI '84 organization
- Capacity: 12,000 (18,000 for concerts)
- Surface: Versatile

Construction
- Groundbreaking: June 1981
- Opened: 14 February 1982
- Renovated: 1999
- Cost: € 16.4 million (1999 renovation)
- Architects: Lidumil Alikalfić; Dušan Đapa

Tenants
- Bosnia men's national basketball team Bosnia and Herzegovina men's national handball team Bosnia and Herzegovina national futsal team Bosnia and Herzegovina men's national ice hockey team KK Bosna; Dubai Basketball (2026-)

Website
- www.oczetra.ba

The Juan Antonio Samaranch Olympic Hall, also known as Zetra Olympic Hall, is an indoor multi-purpose arena in Sarajevo, Bosnia and Herzegovina. Named in honor of Juan Antonio Samaranch in 2010 after his death, it was used for various sporting events at the 1984 Winter Olympics, and as the main venue of the 2019 European Youth Olympic Winter Festival.

== History ==
The construction of the complex started in June 1981 and was officially opened by then-President of the International Olympic Committee, Juan Antonio Samaranch, on 14 February 1982.

=== Olympic venue ===
Zetra Olympic Hall was constructed specifically for the 1984 Winter Olympics, hosted in Sarajevo, and was completed in 1982. Its first major event was the 1983 World Junior Speed Skating Championships. It was described as an "ultramodern, angular edifice" with a copper roof. The indoor venue hosted ice hockey and figure skating events, as well as the last closing ceremony held at an indoor venue until Vancouver 2010.

From 1984 to 1991, Zetra remained in service as a venue for ice sports. It served as the venue for several international speed skating events, and several speed skating world records were broken here.

=== Destruction ===
The arena suffered substantial damage from shelling, bombing and fire by the Serb forces on Monday, May 25, 1992 during the Bosnian War. The interior of the structure, such as the basements and main hall, were put into service as a morgue, storage space for medication and supplies, and a staging area for UN equipment. The wooden seats from the venue were used as material for coffins for civilians killed in the war.

=== Reconstruction ===
After the war, it was discovered that though the building was badly damaged, the foundation was secure. Although the original blueprints were never recovered, in September 1997, reconstruction on the venue, facilitated by the SFOR, began. The International Olympic Committee donated $US 11.5 million to the project, which cost an estimated DM 32 million (€ 16.4 million). The reconstruction was completed in 1999.

== Current use ==
Zetra hosted the Balkans Stability Pact Summit in July 1999. It is currently in service as a sporting arena. It is also used for music concerts, fairs and conferences. Sometimes, parts of the building are rented for other purposes (e.g. for the elections 2014, it was used as the Main Counting Center and election material storage space). The hall also contains a small museum about the 1984 Winter Olympics as well as a gym, billiard hall, bowling alley, pistol range, two cafes and other sports related content such as headquarters for various clubs and associations.

== Concerts and other events ==
List of concerts and other events

1980s

- Alvin Lee - January 26, 1983
- Elton John - April 17, 1984 (European Express Tour)
- Bijelo Dugme - February 2, 1987 (Pljuni i zapjevaj moja Jugoslavijo Tour)
- Merlin - February 10, 1987
- Riblja Čorba - May 8, 1987 (Ujed za dušu Tour)
- "Legende YU Rocka" - December 19, 1987 (YU Grupa, Indexi, Korni Grupa, Time, Radomir Mihailović Točak)
- Riblja Čorba - December 6, 1988 (Priča o ljubavi obično ugnjavi Tour)
- Riblja Čorba - January 29, 1989 (Priča o ljubavi obično ugnjavi Tour)
- Bijelo Dugme - February 11, 1989 (Ćiribiribela Tour)
- "Čičkov YU Rock Maraton — Uz malu pomoć mojih prijatelja" - October 14, 1989 (Indexi, Zabranjeno Pušenje, Riblja Čorba, YU Grupa, Atomsko Sklonište, Jura Stublić & Film, Galija, Psihomodo Pop, Tifa Band, Le Cinema, Vatreni Poljubac, Hari Mata Hari, Formula 4, Bambinosi, Rusija, Konvoj)

1990s

- Lepa Brena i Slatki Greh - February 17, 1990
- Motörhead - March 27, 1990 (opening act: Partibrejkers)
- Scorpions - December 1, 1990 (Crazy World Tour, opening act: Winger)
- 5th Zlatni sabor by Radio Ilijaš - January 15, 1991 (performers: Šaban Šaulić, Miroslav Ilić, Esad Plavi, Haris Džinović, Ana Bekuta, Hasan Dudić, and Ceca Veličković)
- Merlin - February 8, 1991
- "YUTEL za mir" - July 28, 1991 (performers: Bajaga i Instruktori, Crvena Jabuka, Goran Bregović+Haris Džinović, EKV, Dino Merlin, Regina, Indexi, Plavi Orkestar+Nele Karajlić)
- 6th Zlatni sabor by Radio Ilijaš - January 30, 1992 (performers: Dragan Kojić Keba, Enes Begović, Ceca Veličković)
- Yusuf Islam - November 15, 1997
- Indexi - October 1, 1999 (guest: Goran Bregović, Hanka Paldum, Vajta, Tifa, 7 Up, Kornelije Kovač, Miroslav Maraus, Miroslav Šaranović, Milić Vukašinović, and Peco Petej)
- Đorđe Balašević - October 15, 1999

2000s

- El Rumbero Family of Gipsy Kings - February 26, 2000
- DJ BoBo - April 1, 2000 (opening act: Erato, concert organized as part of the Open Hearts Sarajevo project promoting cultural exchange and tolerance in Bosnia-Herzegovina)
- Plavi Orkestar - April 20, 2000 (guests: Knock Out, Punkt, Erogene Zone, Rade Šerbedžija)
- "Najveći događaj u gradu" - December 1, 2000 (Opening of Mercator Center Sarajevo, performers: Đorđe Balašević, Oliver Dragojević, Vlado Kreslin, Indexi, Kemal Monteno, Gertruda Munitić, Duško Gojković, and Seven Up)
- Zdravko Čolić - May 18, 2001 (Okano Tour)
- Hari Mata Hari - November 2, 2001
- Haris Džinović - December 22, 2001
- Halid Muslimović - 2002
- Severina - December 8, 2002 (Virujen u te live tour)
- Safet Isović - May 29, 2003 (guests: Haris Džinović)
- "OBN Supernova Music Talents" - December 14, 2003
- Halid Bešlić - 2004 (guests: Emir Gljiva Mirče, Emir Hadžihafizbegović, and Jasna Žalica)
- Hari Mata Hari - November 25, 2004
- David Copperfield - October 1, 2005
- Tony Cetinski - March 3, 2006 (guests: Toše Proeski, Aki Rahimovski, Darko Bakić, Erato)
- Simple Minds - April 10, 2006 (Black And White Tour, opening act: Tyler)
- Željko Joksimović - April 27, 2006 (guests: Dino Merlin, Hari Varešanović, and Halid Bešlić)
- Paco de Lucía - July 5, 2006
- Eros Ramazzotti - July 7, 2006
- José Carreras - July 10, 2006
- "Indexi i prijatelji" - September 12, 2006 (performers: Zoran Predin, Bisera Veletanlić, Željko Bebek, Nermin Puškar, Dado Topić, Aki Rahimovski, Tifa, Hari Varešanović, Massimo Savić, Severina Vučković, Natali Dizdar, Maja Milinković, Ivica Šarić, Halid Bešlić, Fazla - guests: Fadil Redžić, Ranko Rihtman, Kornelije Kovač, Đorđe Novković, Nenad Jurin, Sinan Alimanović, Enco Lesić, Miroslav Maraus, Vlado Pravdić, Slobodan Misavljević, Ismet Arnautalić, Miroslav Šaranović, Đorđe Uzelac, Milić Vukašinović, Peco Petej)
- Zdravko Čolić - October 20, 2007 (Zavičaj Tour)
- Deep Purple - November 3, 2007 (Rapture of the Deep tour, opening act: No Rules)
- Halid Bešlić - March 7, 2008 (guests: Sejo Boy, Nedžad Salković, and Nikola Rokvić)
- James Blunt - June 15, 2008 (opening: Zoster)
- "Mladi mladima" - May 23, 2009 (sponsored by Turkey's military mission in Bosnia - performers: Bombaj Štampa, Letu štuke, Zoster, Skroz, Defence)
- Lepa Brena - May 30, 2009 (Uđi slobodno Tour)
- Riccardo Muti - July 13, 2009 (participation from organizers of Maggio Musicale Fiorentino)
- Željko Samardžić - October 31, 2009 (guests: Lane Gutović and Studio Alektik)
- Crvena Jabuka - December 5, 2009 (band's 25th anniversary, guests: Enis Bešlagić, Zijo Valentino, and Halid Bešlić)

2010s

- Chris Liebing - November 12, 2010
- Tony Cetinski - December 4, 2010
- David Guetta - December 18, 2010 (warm up: Glenn Morrison, Angel Anx, and Benjamin De Luxe)
- Gibonni - February 10, 2011 (guest: Damir Urban)
- Miroslav Ilić - February 19, 2011
- Đorđe Balašević - November 18, 2011
- In the Land of Blood and Honey premiere - February 14, 2012 (guests: Angelina Jolie)
- Zvijezda možeš biti ti season 4 final - February 17, 2012 (guests: Aco Pejović, Viki Miljković, Mirza Šoljanin, Elvir Laković Laka)
- Goran Bregović - March 24, 2012 (guest: Zdravko Čolić)
- Inna - April 28, 2012 (opening: DJ Tom Novy)
- Outcast Fest - May 26, 2012 (Van Gogh, S.A.R.S., Majke, and Obojeni Program)
- Alexandra Stan - June 1, 2012 (warm up: Freemasons, Funkerman, and Loco Baby)
- Michael Flatley's Lord of the Dance - October 21, 2012
- Brit Floyd - November 3, 2012 (The Pink Floyd Tribute Show)
- Kemal Monteno - November 28, 2012 (guests: Severina, Zdravko Čolić, Dino Merlin, Goran Bregović, Rade Šerbedžija, Oliver Dragojević, Dražen Žerić, and Hanka Paldum)
- Aca Lukas - December 15, 2012 (guest: Ana Bekuta)
- Nina Badrić - February 14, 2013 (guests: Vanna, Maya Sar, Mirza Šoljanin & Punkt)
- Oliver Dragojević - March 23, 2013
- The Fire of Anatolia - March 29, 2013
- Zvijezda možeš biti ti season 5 final - April 12, 2013 (guests: Halid Bešlić, Jelena Rozga, Enes Begović, Kaliopi, Nataša Bekvalac, Željko Samardžić, Dragan Kojić Keba, Semir Cerić Koke, Emina Jahović, Šerif Konjević, Adnan Jakupović, Željko Bebek, Miligram, Selma Bajrami)
- Plavi Orkestar - April 19, 2013 (guests: Mirza Šoljanin, Sabahudin Topalbećirević, and Dubioza Kolektiv)
- Aco Pejović - May 10, 2013
- Miligram - May 17, 2013 (guests: Hari Varešanović and Denial Ahmetović)
- Severina - October 12, 2013 (Dobrodošao u Klub Tour)
- Vaya Con Dios - October 26, 2013
- "Sa so mange - Veče donatora" - December 19, 2013 (guests: Branko Đurić, Goran Bregović, Saša Lošić, Gibonni, Severina, Petar Grašo, Jelena Rozga, Lepa Brena, Jelena Karleuša, Dragana Mirković, Tonči Huljić, Miligram, and Haris Džinović)
- Zdravko Čolić - November 29, 2014 (Vatra i barut Tour)
- Đorđe Balašević - April 25, 2015
- Zorica Brunclik - May 28, 2015 (guest: Šerif Konjević)
- Parni Valjak - December 12, 2015
- Marija Šerifović - March 18, 2016
- Miligram - May 27, 2016
- Zvezde Granda season 10 final - July 15, 2016 (competitors: Ibro Bublin, Fatmir Sulejmani, Ermin "Bubi" Redžić; guest performers: Aca Lukas, Viki Miljković, Marija Šerifović, Lepa Brena, Jelena Karleuša)
- "Express i ja" - October 20, 2016 (25 years of the Avaz publishing group — performers: Lepa Brena, Halid Bešlić, Miroslav Ilić, Hanka Paldum, Hari Mata Hari, Haris Džinović, Halid Muslimović, Željko Samardžić, Selma Bajrami, Aco Pejović, Boban Rajović, Duško Kuliš, Rada Manojlović, Haris Berković, Enes Begović, Nihad Alibegović, Emir Đulović, Fatmir Sulejmani, Ibro Bublin, Adis Škaljo, Denial Ahmetović, Amar Jašarspahić Gile)
- Saša Matić - December 10, 2016
- Oliver Dragojević & Gibonni - March 8, 2017
- Aca Lukas - October 20, 2017 (guest: Mile Kitić)
- 2Cellos - March 10, 2018
- Recep Tayyip Erdoğan 2018 presidential campaign rally - May 20, 2018 (participants: Recep Tayyip Erdoğan, Bakir Izetbegović)
- Saint Petersburg State Ballet on Ice performing The Sleeping Beauty - December 3, 2018
- Amira Medunjanin & TrondheimSolistene - December 6, 2018
- Saša Kovačević - December 22, 2018
- Tony Cetinski - March 9, 2019
- Rasta - November 23, 2019 (guest: Sandra Afrika)

2020s

- "Born in Ghetto" - August 12, 2022 (performers: Jala Brat, Buba Corelli, RAF Camora, InaS$, Elena Kitić, Coby, Antoniette, Devito, Goga Sekulić, Pirelli, Baka Prase, Emirez, Igor Buzov, and Klijent)
- Sting - October 2, 2022 (My Songs Tour)
- Aca Lukas - November 12, 2022
- Halid Bešlić - March 11, 2023
- Gipsy Kings - March 18, 2023
- Aleksandra Prijović - October 28, 2023 (Od istoka do zapada Tour)
- Aleksandra Prijović - October 29, 2023
- Aleksandra Prijović - October 30, 2023
- Saša Matić - March 8, 2024
- Maher Zain - April 12, 2024
- Lepa Brena - April 20, 2024 (Imam pesmu da vam pevam Tour)
- Lepa Brena - April 21, 2024
- Jelena Rozga - November 2, 2024 (Minut srca mog Tour)
- Aleksandra Prijović - December 6, 2024
- Marija Šerifović - December 28, 2024 (originally scheduled for October 12, 2024 but postponed out of respect for the victims of the 2024 Bosnian floods)
- Lexington Band - February 14, 2025
- Aco Pejović (guest: Halid Bešlić) - June 6, 2025
- Dragana Mirković - September 27, 2025
- Zdravko Čolić - March 27, 2026 (with a symphony orchestra)
- Zdravko Čolić - March 28, 2026
- Zdravko Čolić - April 4, 2026
- Zdravko Čolić - April 5, 2026
- Zdravko Čolić - April 6, 2026
- "Indexi i prijatelji" - May 12, 2026 (free admission) (performers: Sarajevo Philharmonic Orchestra, Kasiopeja Choir; Indexi: Fadil Redžić, Ranko Rihtman, Nenad Jurin, and Peco Petej; guests: Dino Mangafić, Ivan Kukić, Muris Varajić, Vlatko Stefanovski, Dado Topić, Željko Bebek, Branko Đurić, Goran Karan, Zoran Predin, Nermin Puškar, Vlado Kalember, Neno Belan, Vajta, Fazla, Aida Mušanović-Arsić, Amel Ćurić, and Željka Katavić Pilj)
- Željko Joksimović - June 27, 2026
- Troy by Fire of Anatolia - October 16, 2026
- Vesna Zmijanac - December 19, 2026
- Bijelo Dugme – March 27, 2027

== See also ==
- List of indoor arenas in Bosnia and Herzegovina
