= List of events held in Belgrade Arena =

This is the list of events held and announced to be held in the Belgrade Arena.

== Past events ==
Musical events
Sporting events
Political rallies
Theatrical performances
Conferences and fairs
Other events

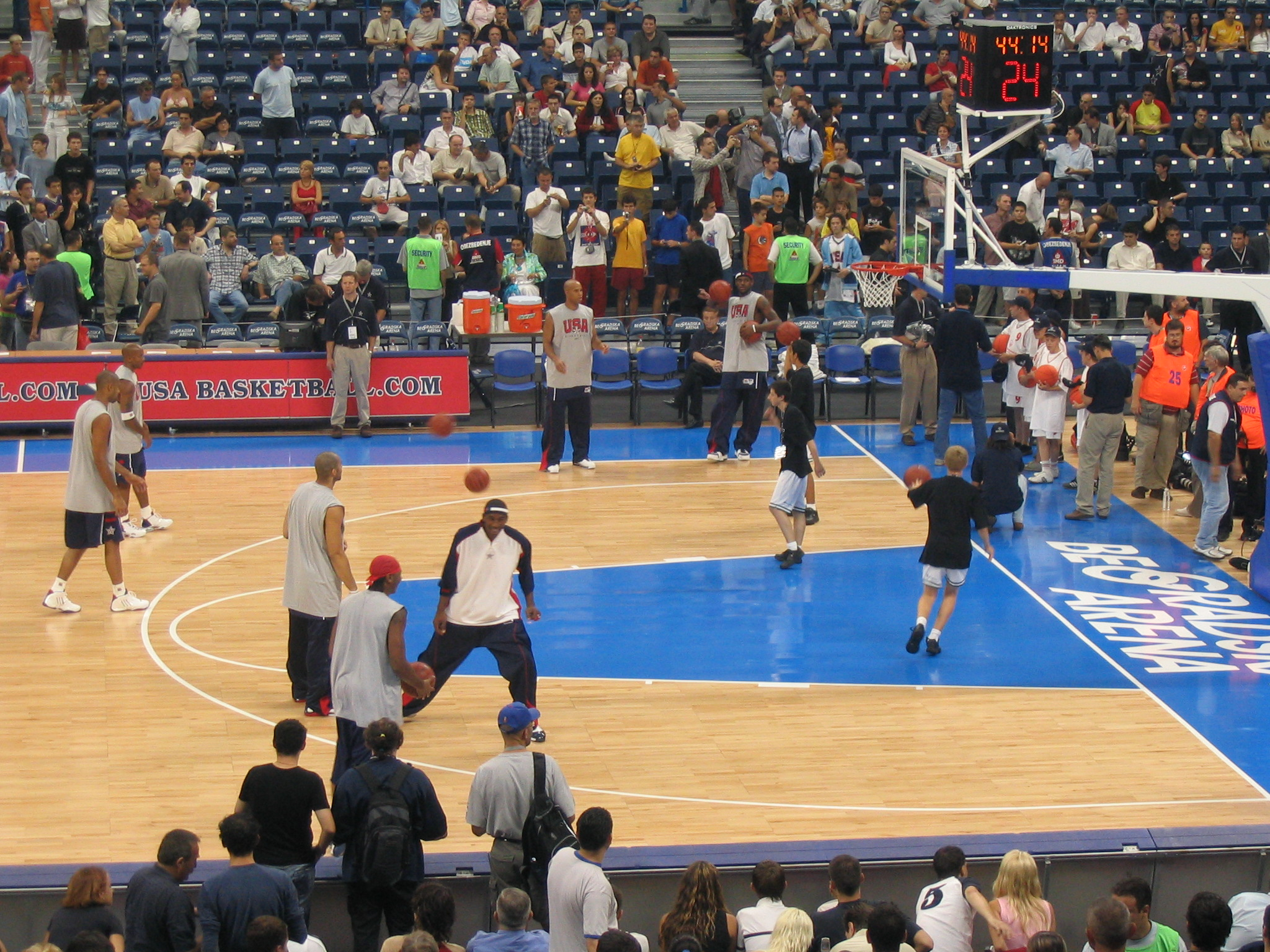
August 6, 2004: The warm-up for the basketball friendly match between Serbia and Montenegro and United States.

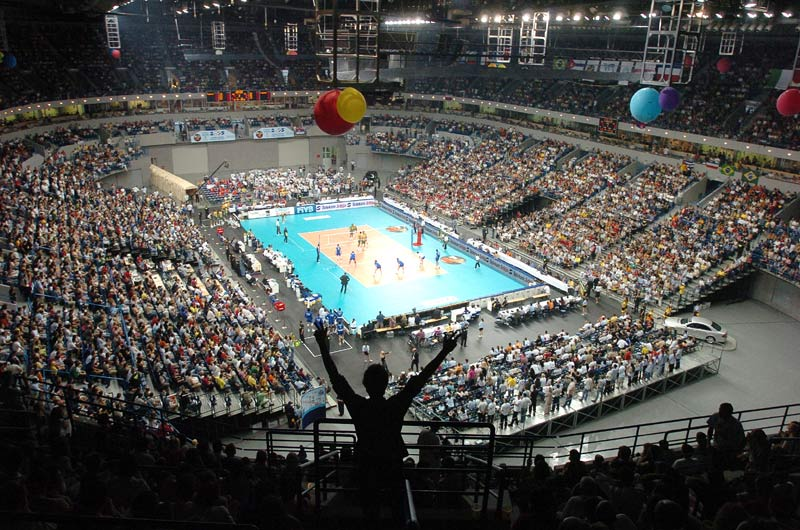
July 10, 2005: The 2005 FIVB Volleyball World League final match between Serbia and Montenegro and Brazil is the first sold-out event in the Belgrade Arena, with 18,140 people attending the match. The lower capacity of the Arena was caused by the removal of the seats on Level 100 East and Level 100 West.

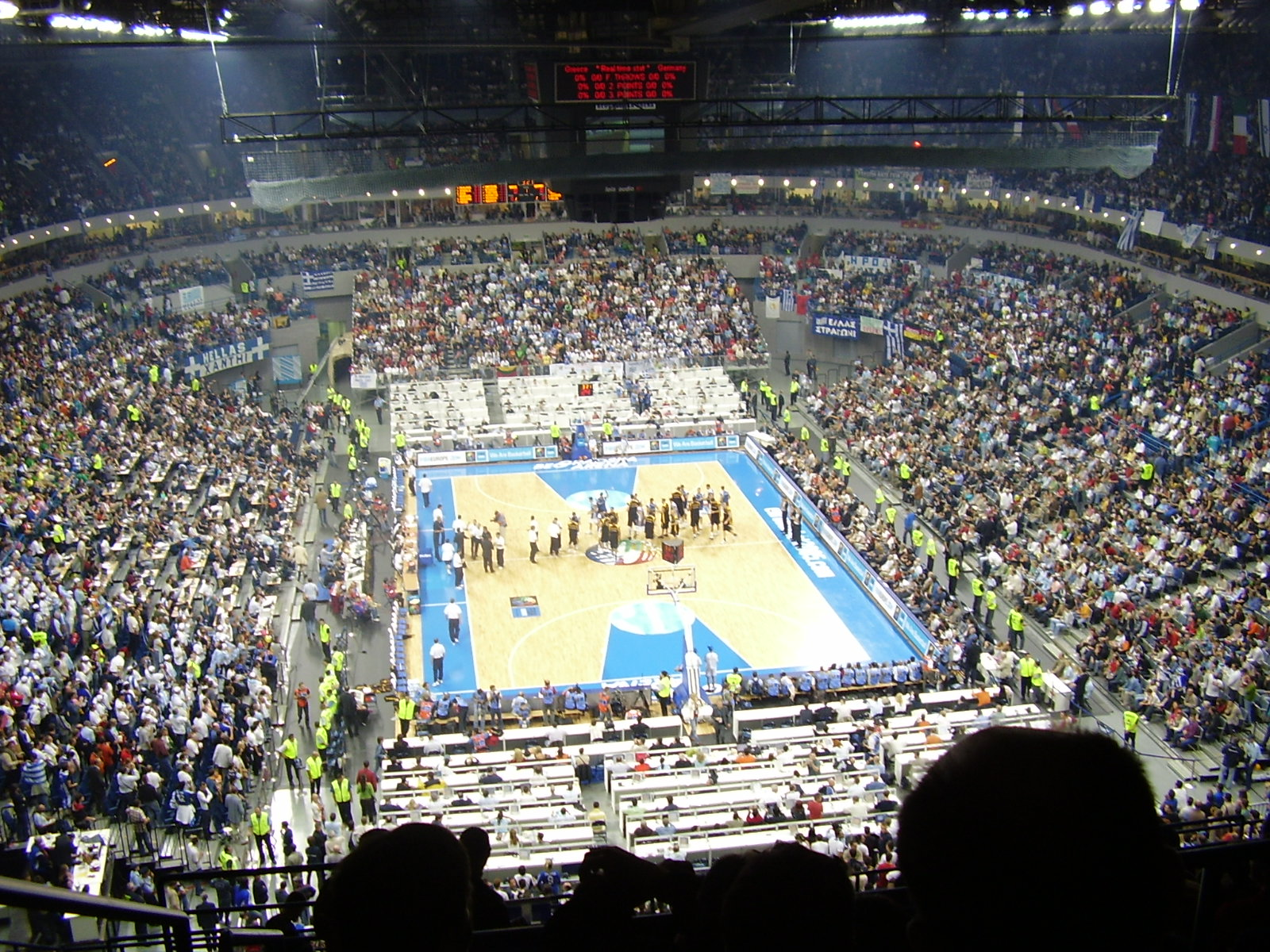
22–25 September 2005: The elimination round of the EuroBasket 2005 is held in the Arena, with Greece becoming the European champions.

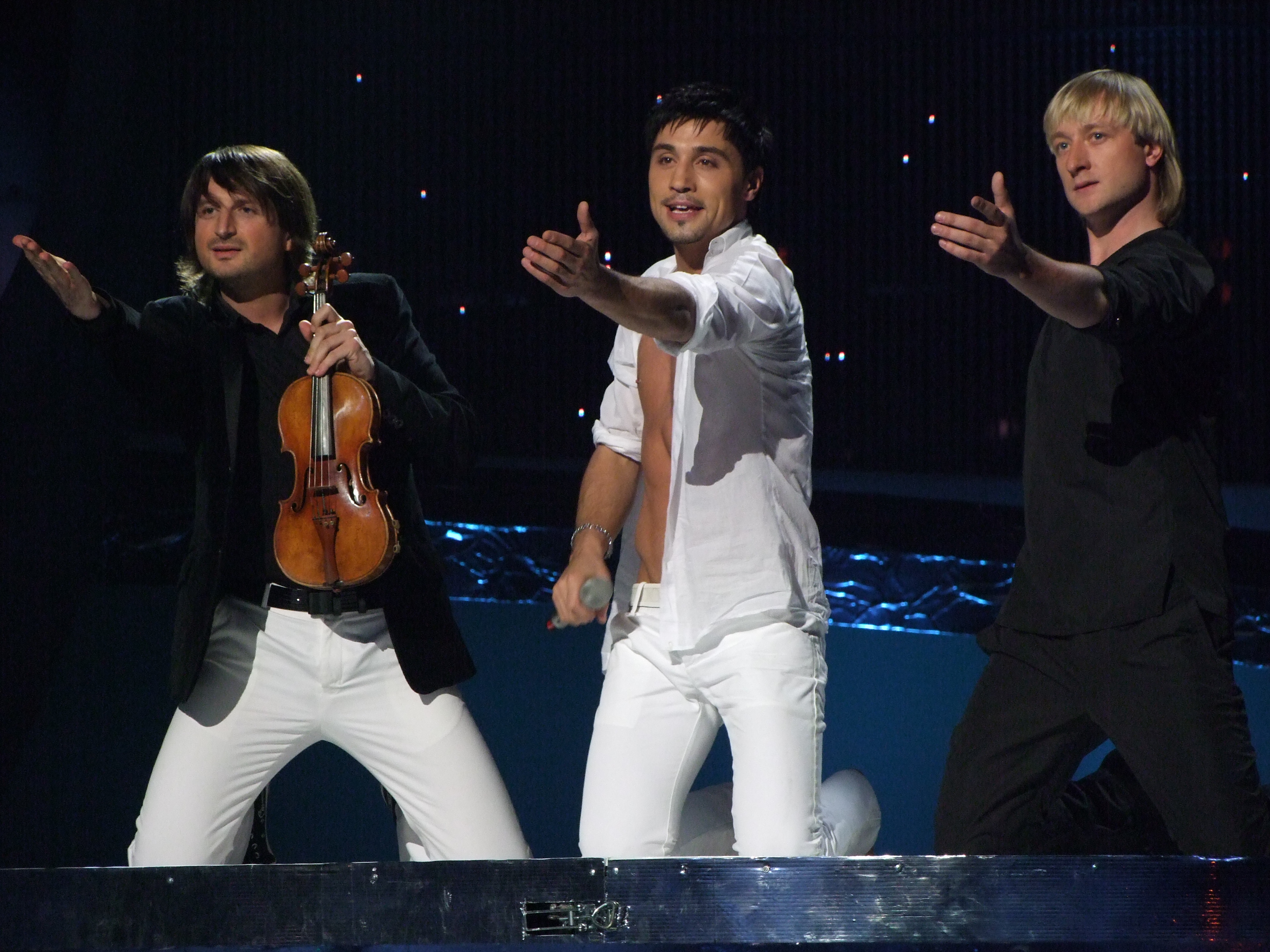
20–24 May 2008: The Eurovision Song Contest 2008 is held in the Arena, with Russia's Dima Bilan winning among 43 participating countries' acts.

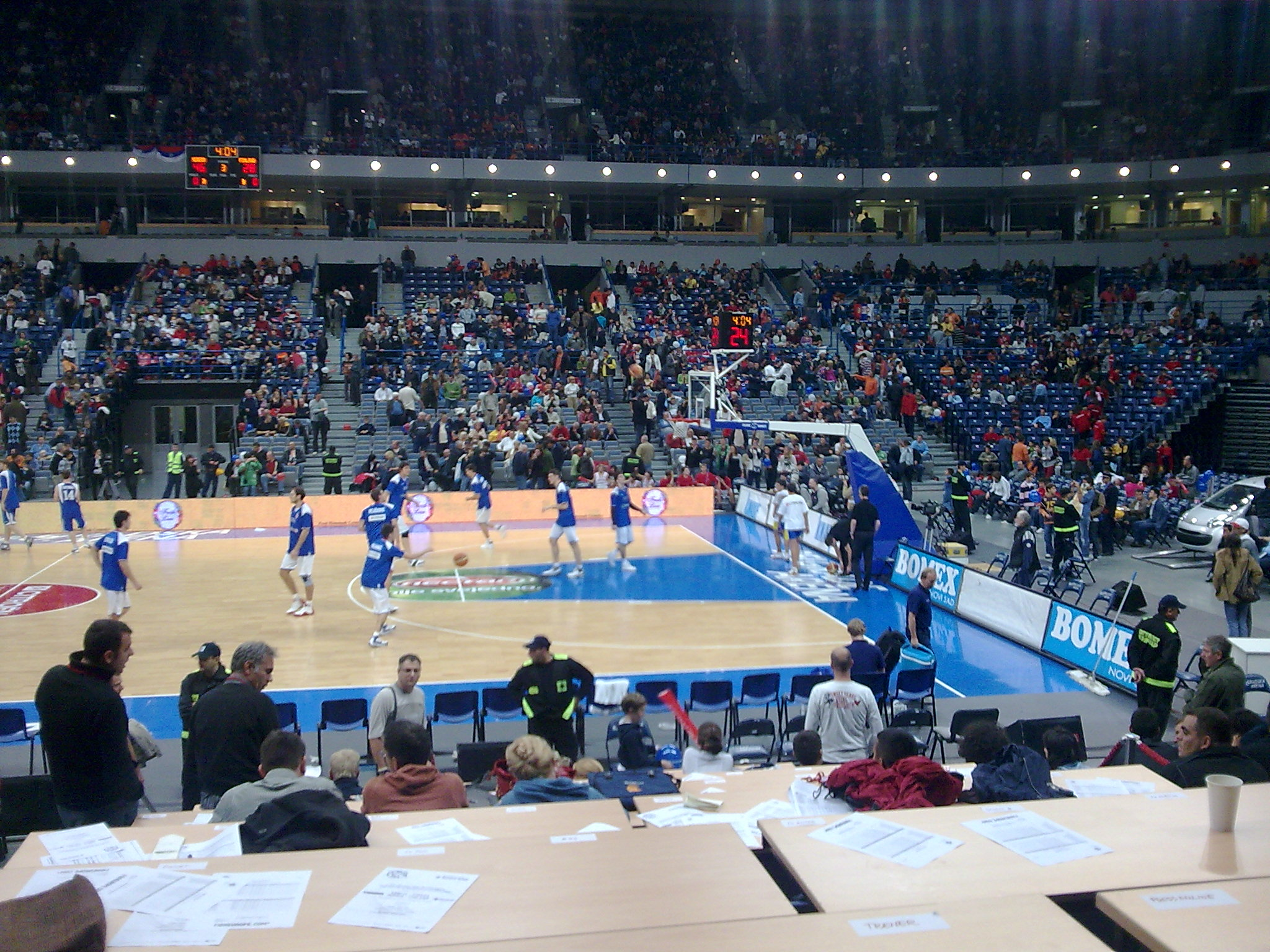
August–September, 2008: Four Serbia national team EuroBasket 2009 qualifying matches have been played at the Arena. The attendance at these matches is between 14,000 and 18,000, which sets up the record of the qualifications.

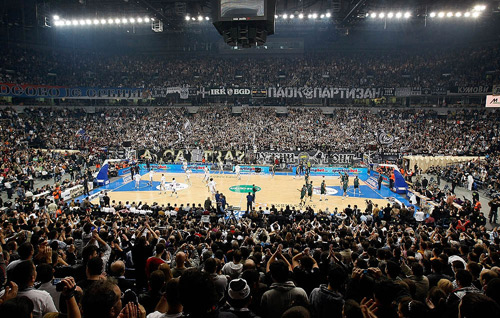
March 5, 2009: The attendance of 22,567 at the basketball match between Partizan and Panathinaikos sets an all-time record for the EuroLeague.

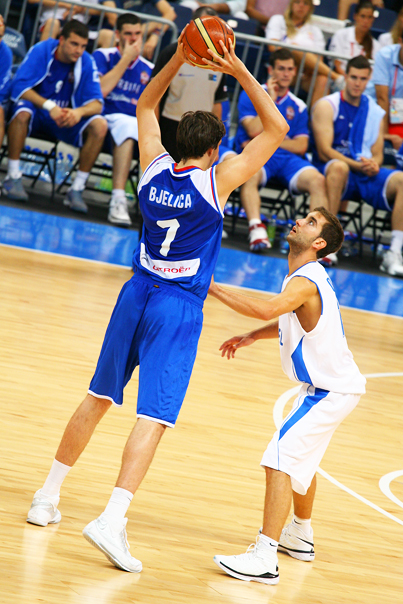
1–12 July 2009: Opening and closing ceremonies, as well as the basketball tournament at the 2009 Summer Universiade are held at the Arena.

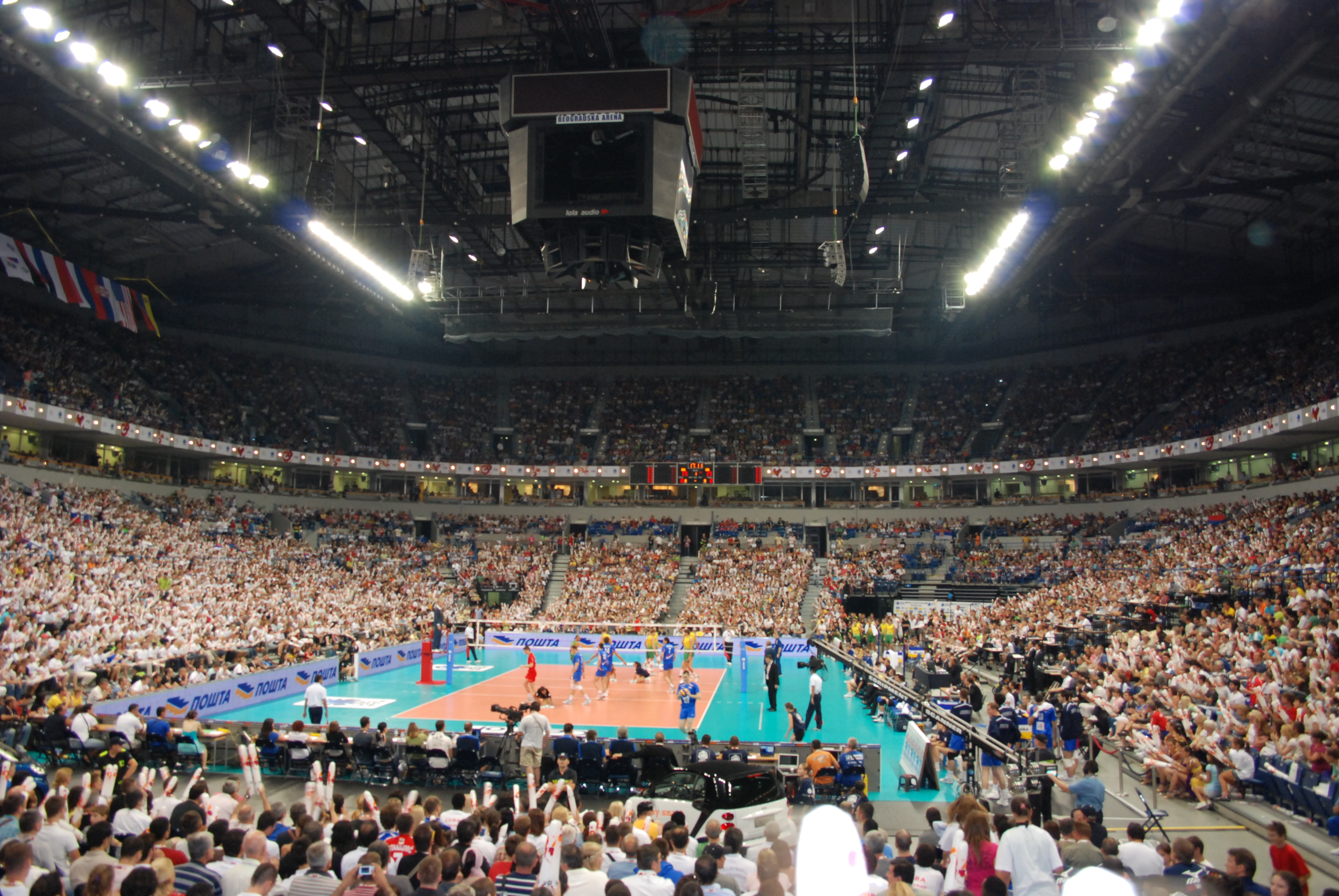
July 26, 2009: The attendance of 22,680 at the final match of the 2009 FIVB Volleyball World League between Serbia and Brazil was the highest one for a sporting venue in the Arena at the time.

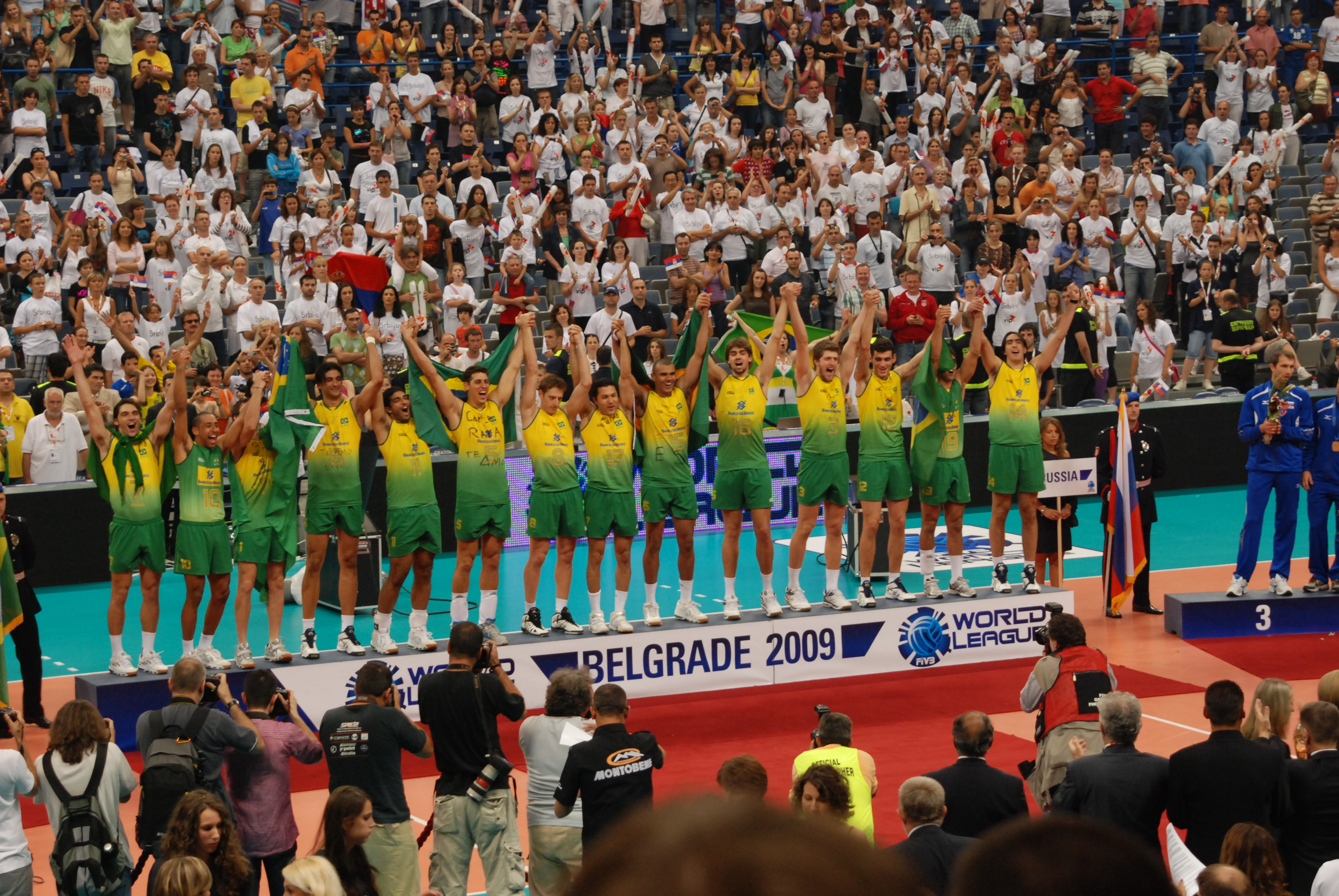
July 26, 2009: Brazil wins the 2009 FIVB Volleyball World League.

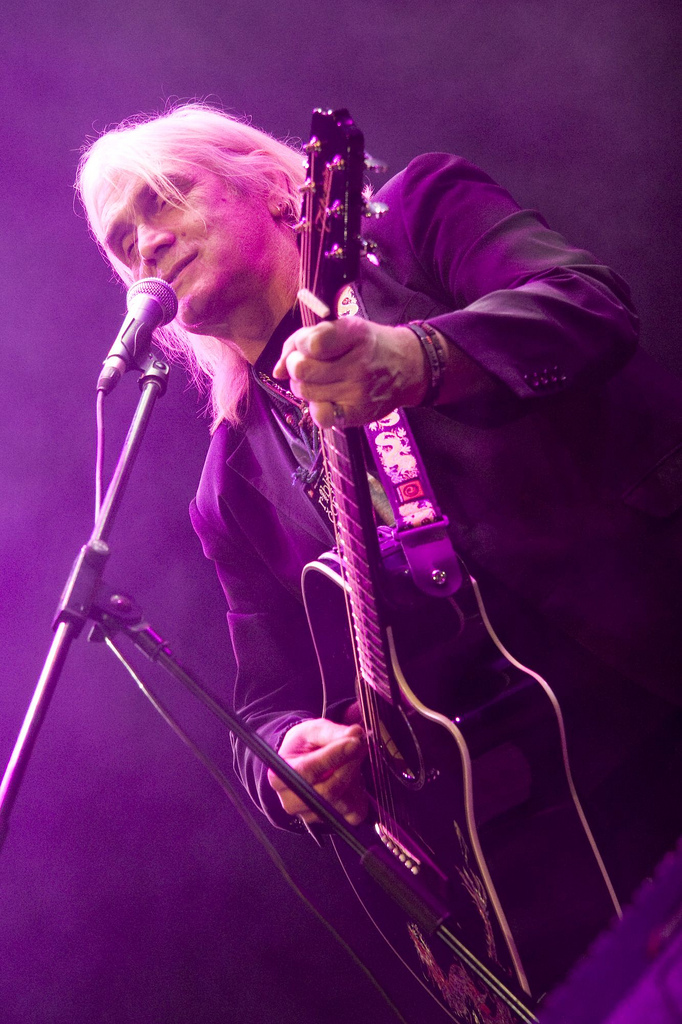
October 31, 2009: Serbian rock band Riblja Čorba holds a concert in the Arena.

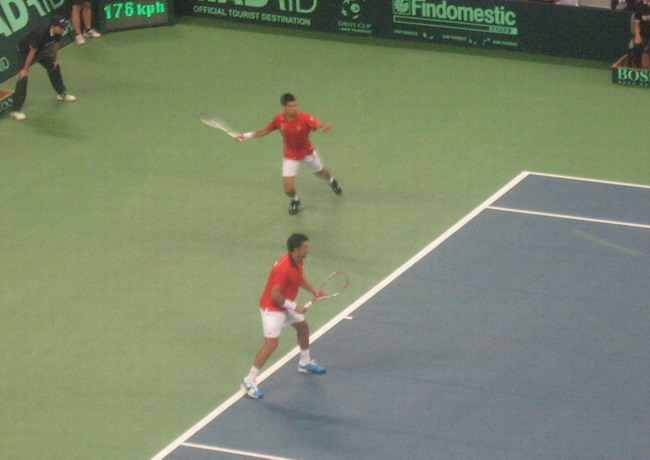
17–19 September 2010: Serbia reaches the 2010 Davis Cup World Group finals with a 3–2 semifinal win against Czech Republic.

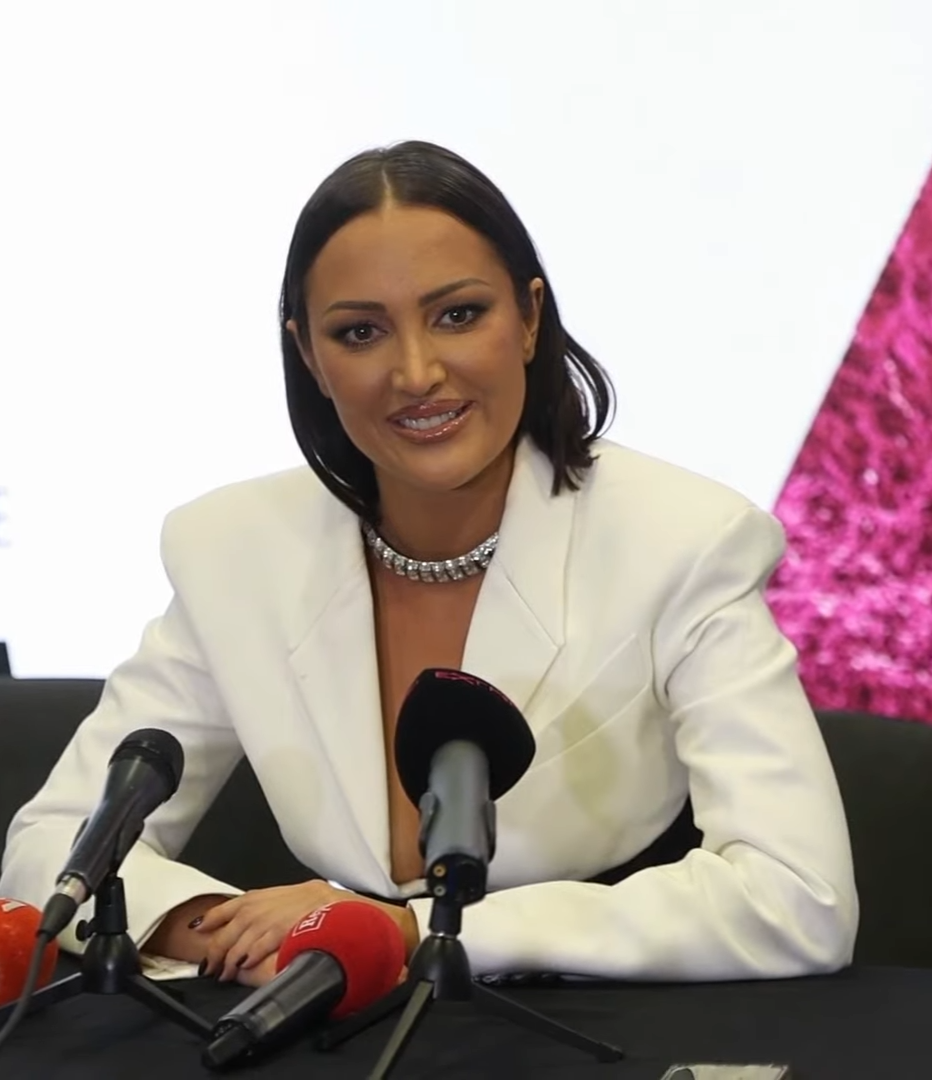
28–30 September 2023, 22 December 2024: Serbian pop-folk singer Aleksandra Prijović holds tree consecutive concerts in the Arena, and four overall, holding the record for the female artist with the most concerts in the venue.

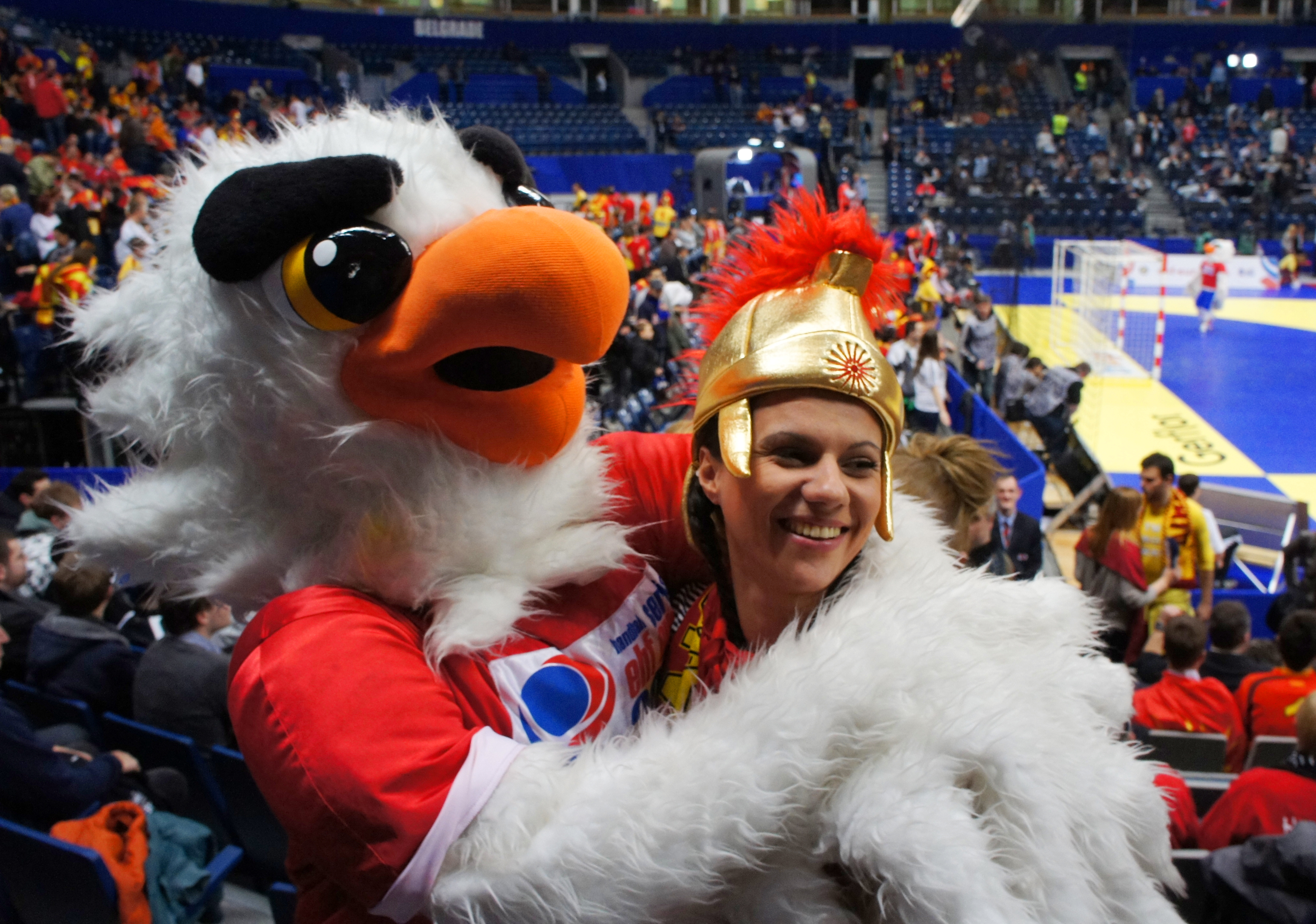
21–29 January 2012: Main round and knockout stage of the 2012 European Men's Handball Championship have been held in the Arena.

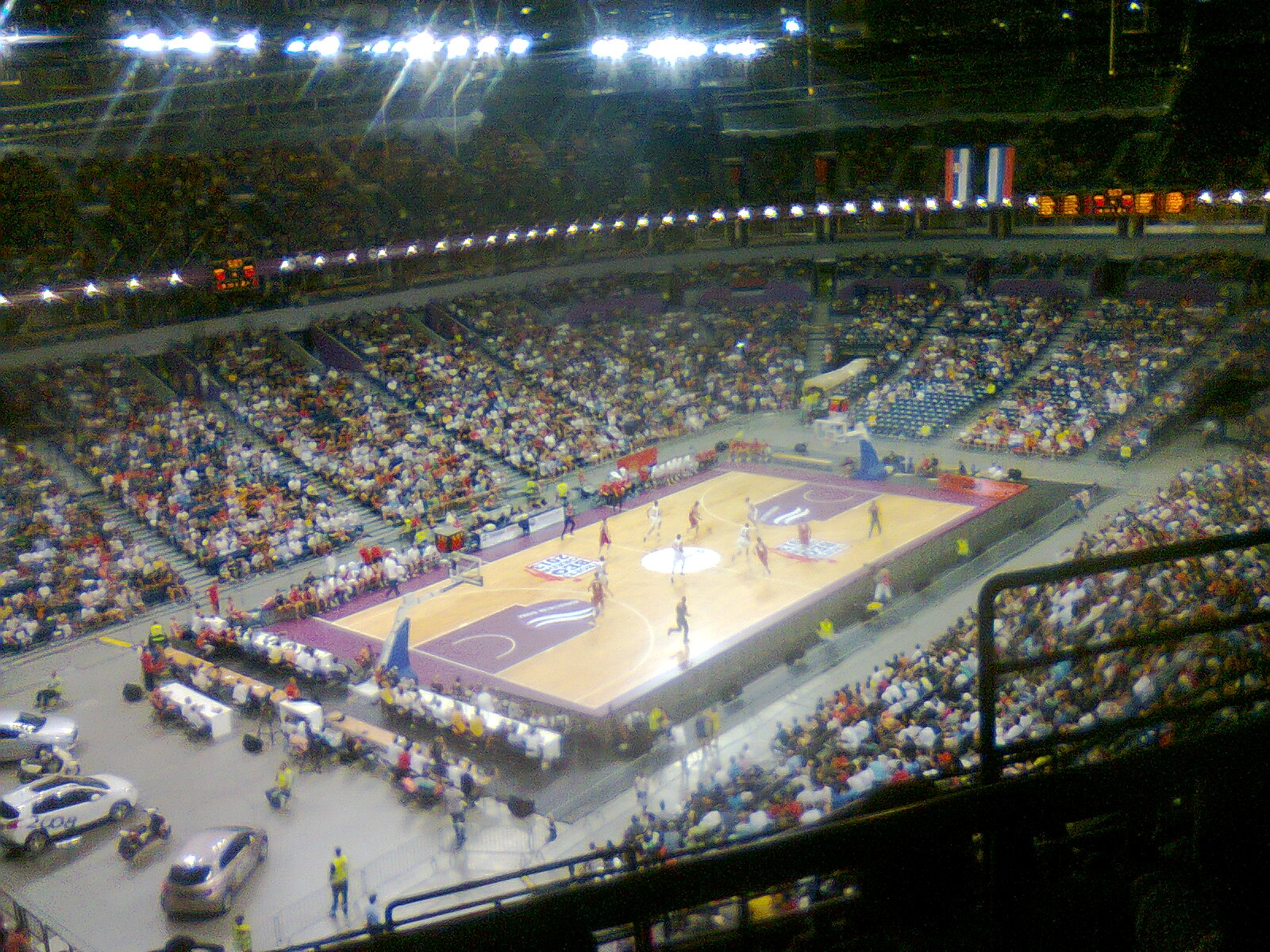
August 12, 2013: Serbia vs. Russia, EuroBasket 2013 preparation match.

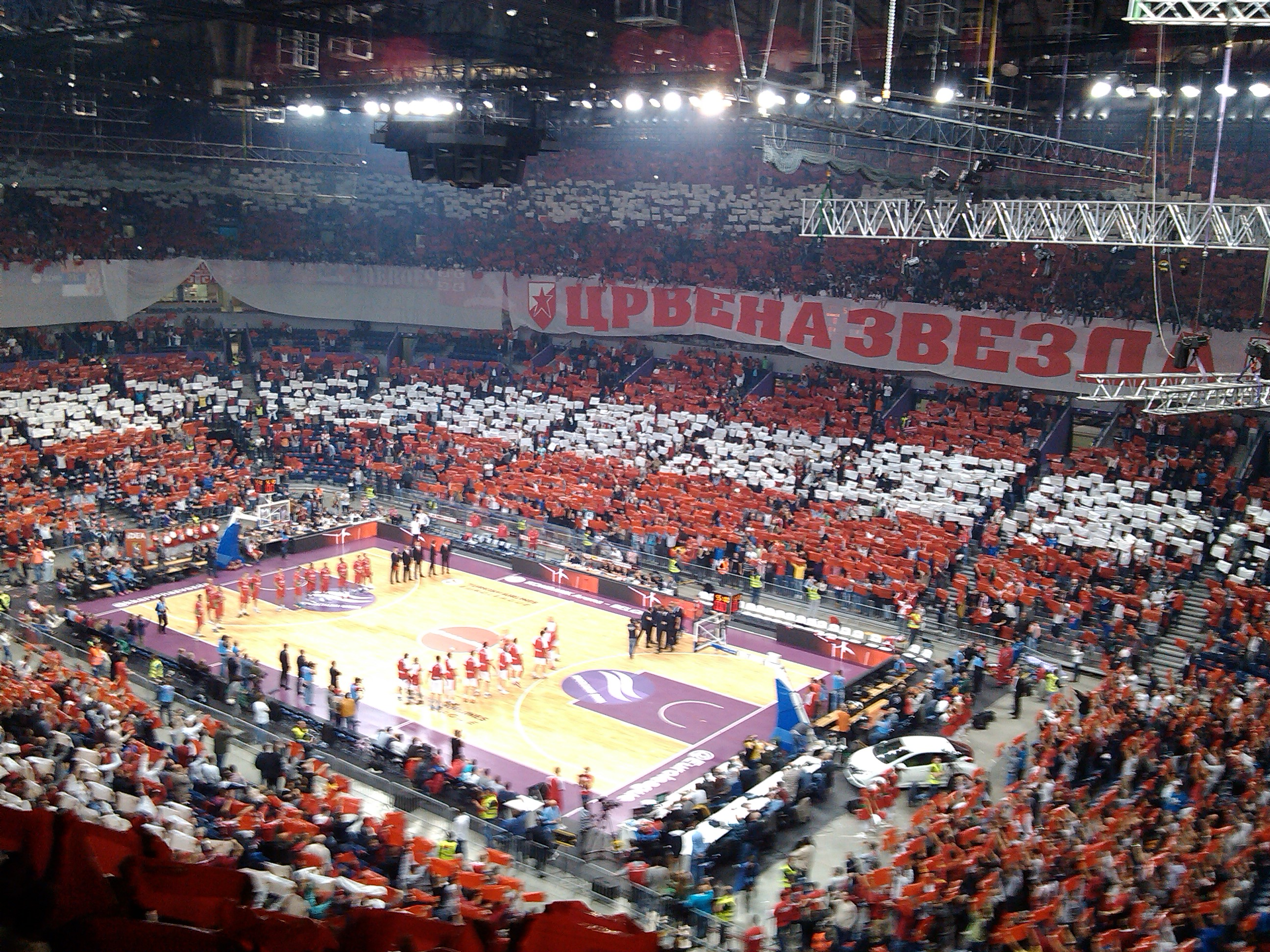
October 17, 2013: Crvena zvezda vs. Lokomotiv Kuban, Euroleague 2013–14 Regular Season Group D match. The first Crvena zvezda Euroleague match in the Arena.

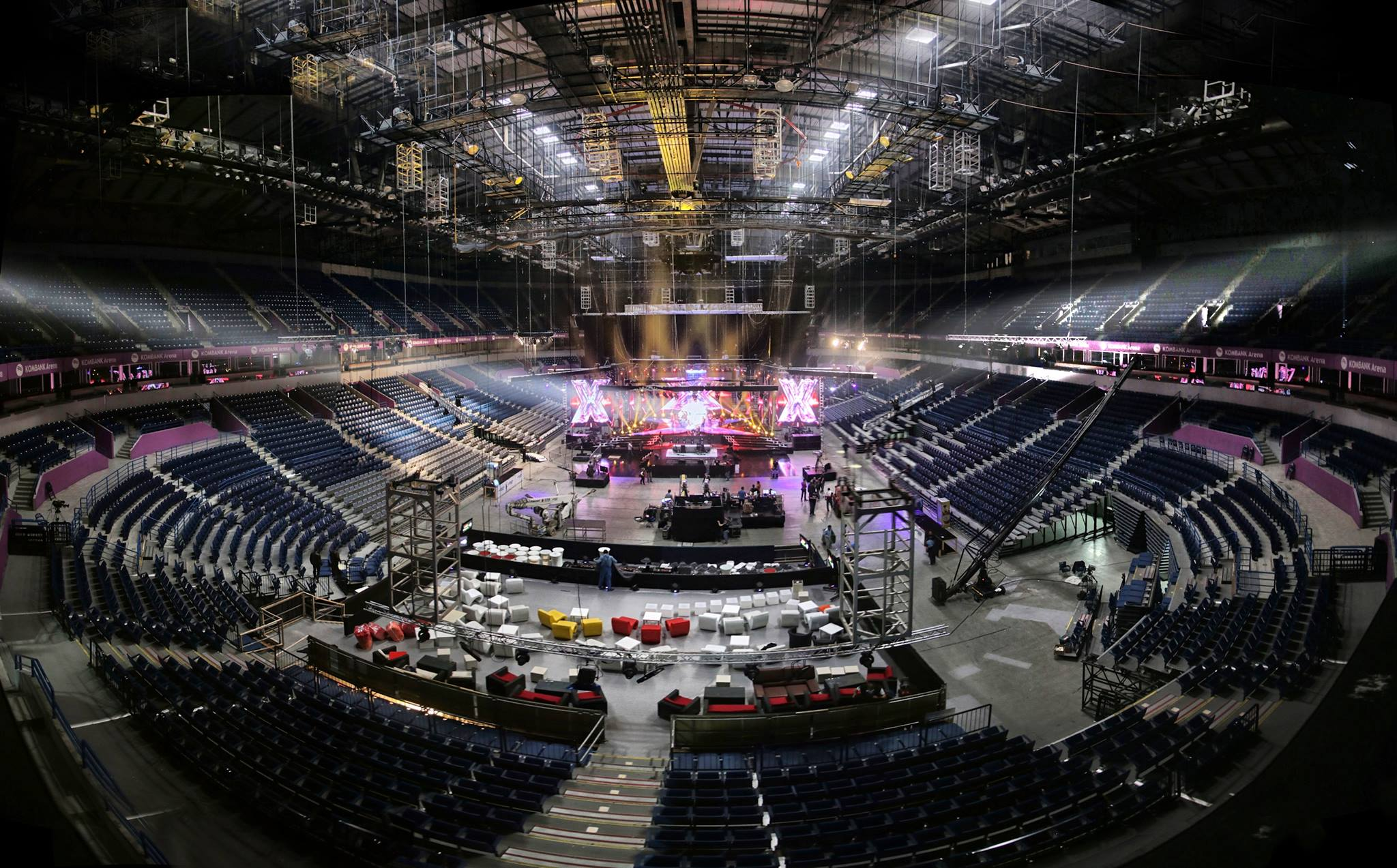
March 23, 2014: X Factor Adria 2013–2014 talent show final.

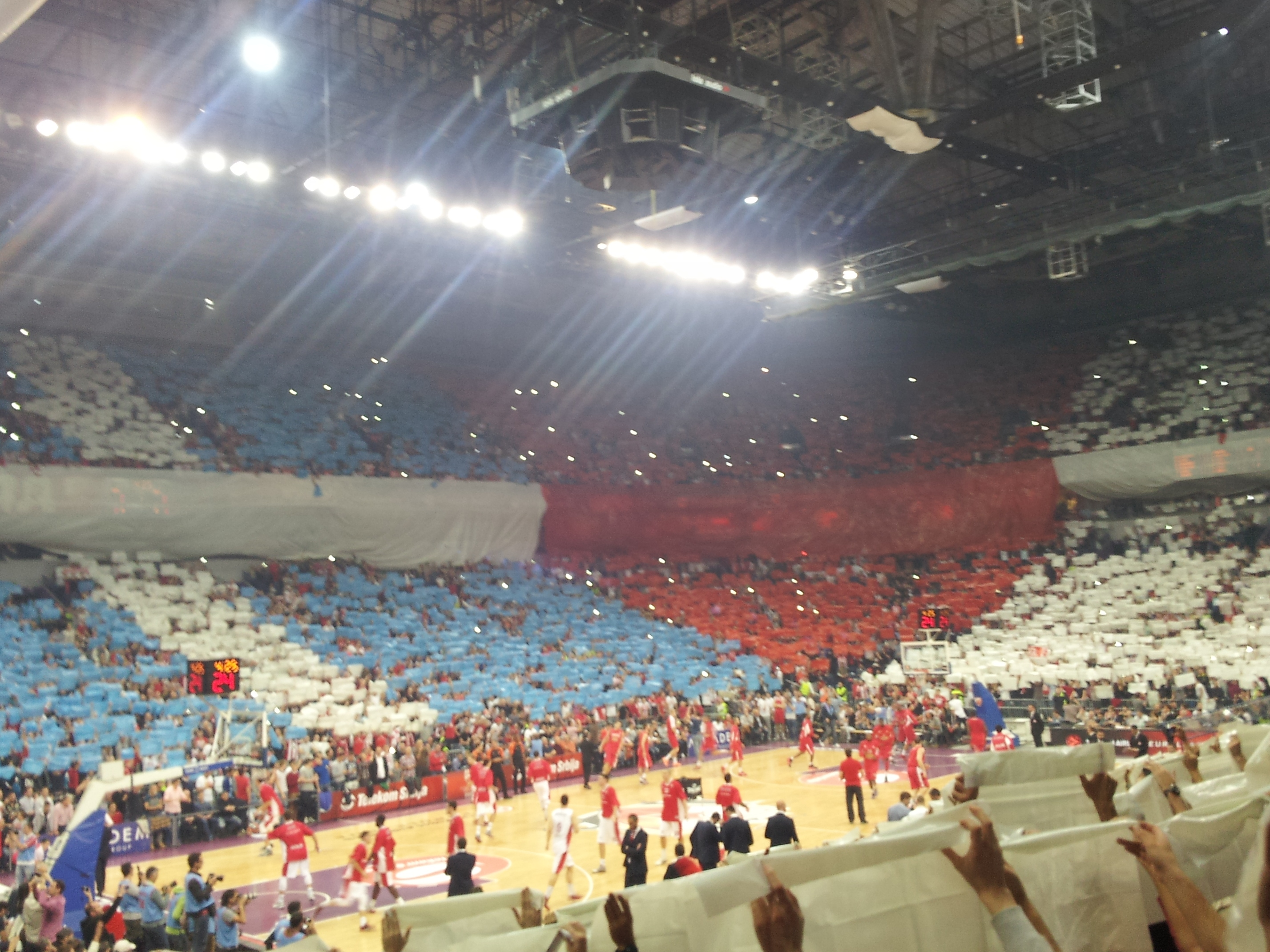
November 7, 2014: Crvena zvezda vs. Olympiacos, 2014–15 Euroleague Regular Season Group D match.

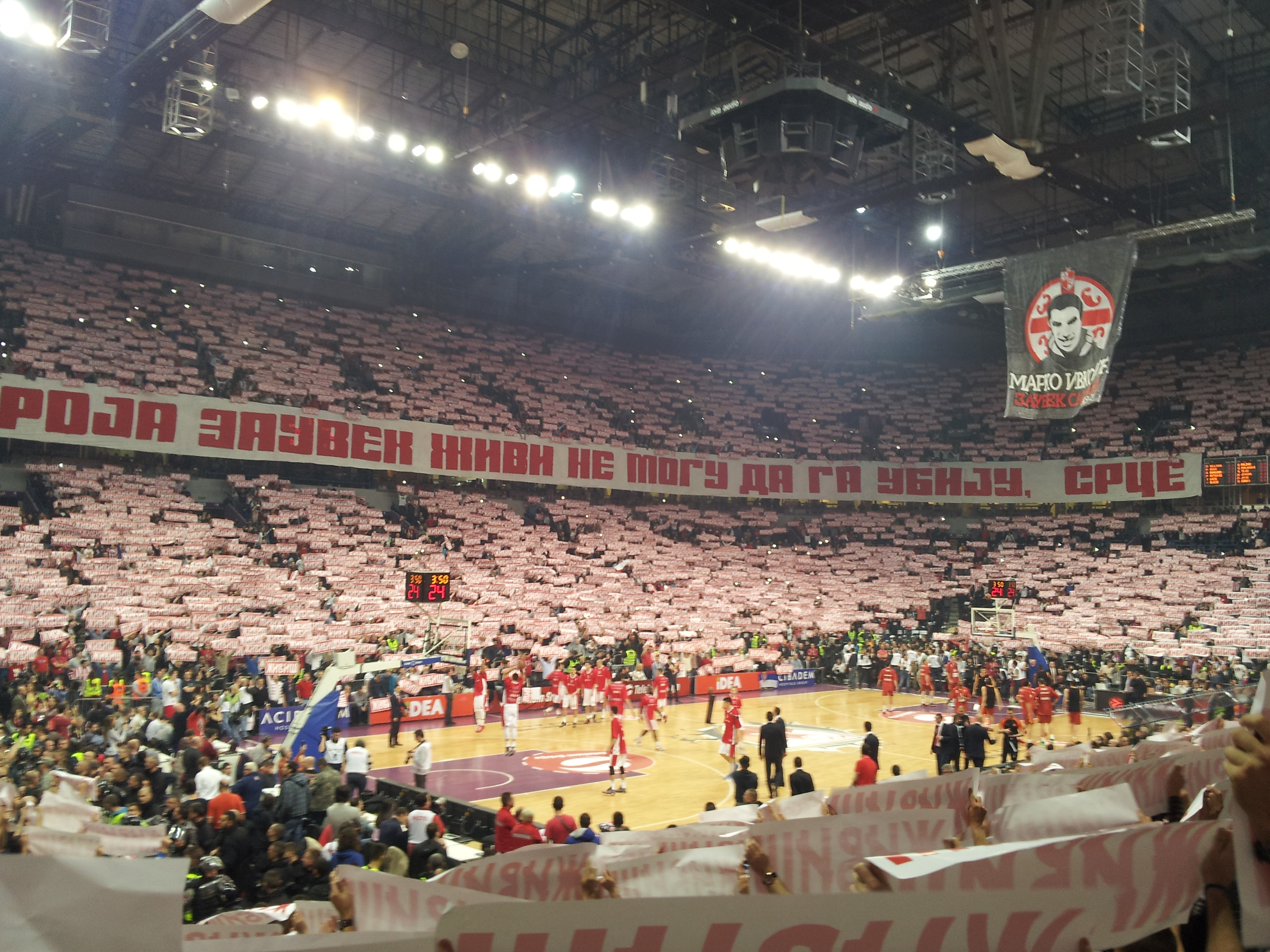
January 16, 2015: Crvena zvezda vs. Galatasaray, 2014–15 Euroleague Top 16 Group E match.

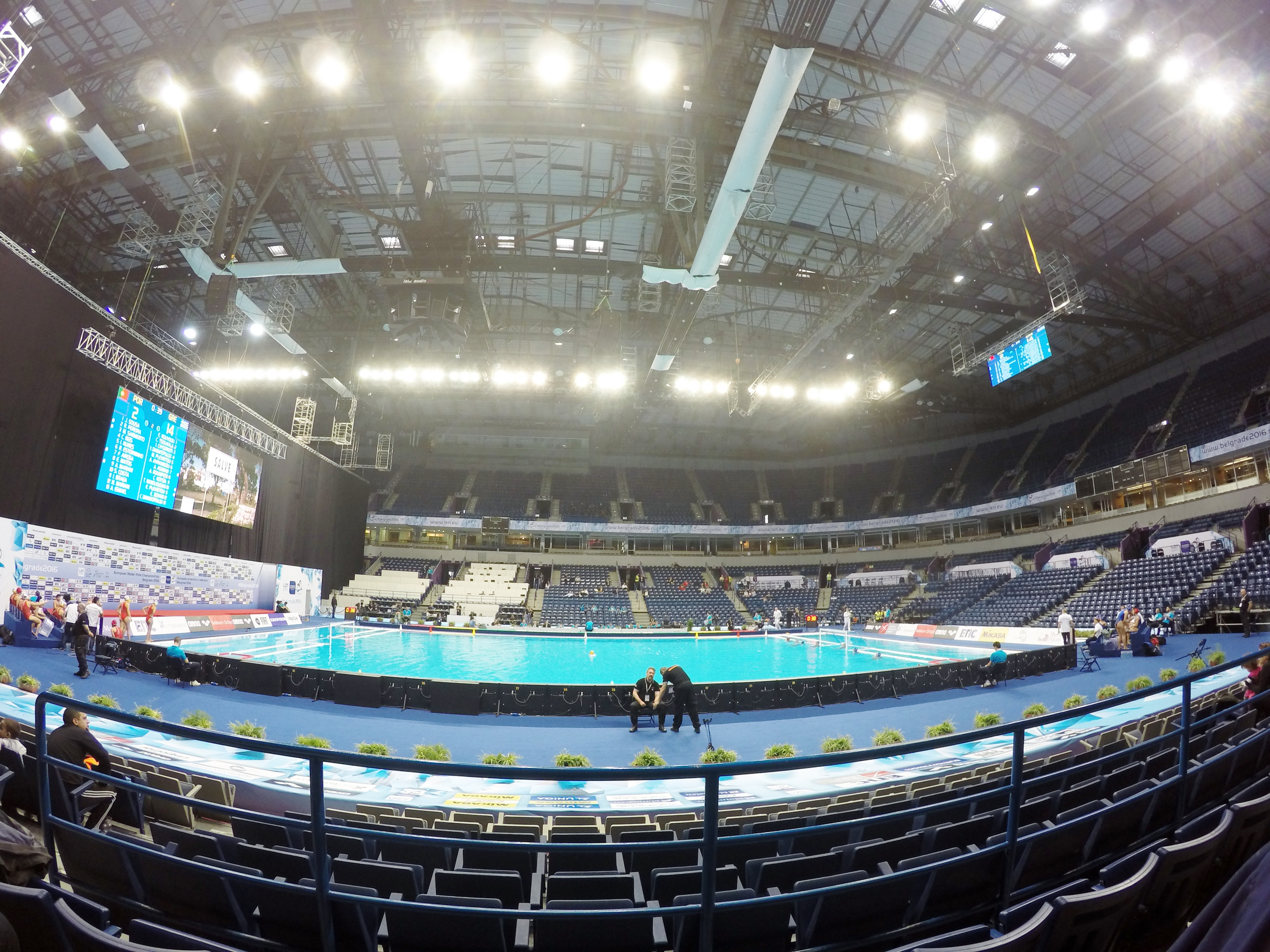
10–23 January 2016: Main round and knockout stage of the 2016 Men's and Women's European Water Polo Championships have been held in the Arena. The first time a water polo pool has been installed in the Arena. The attendance of 18,473 at the men's final match between Serbia and Montenegro was the highest one in water polo history.

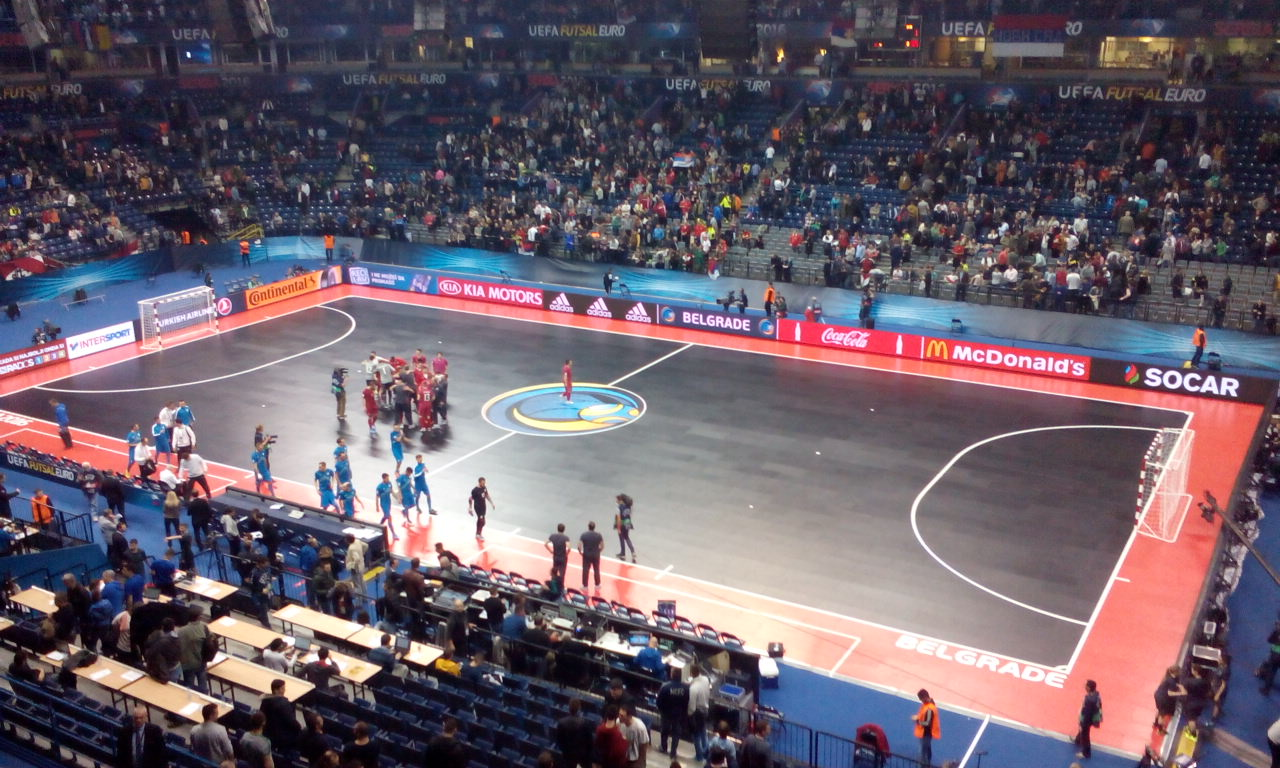
2–13 February 2016: The 2016 UEFA Futsal Championship has been held in the Arena. The overall attendance of over 100,000 was the highest one in UEFA Futsal Championship history.

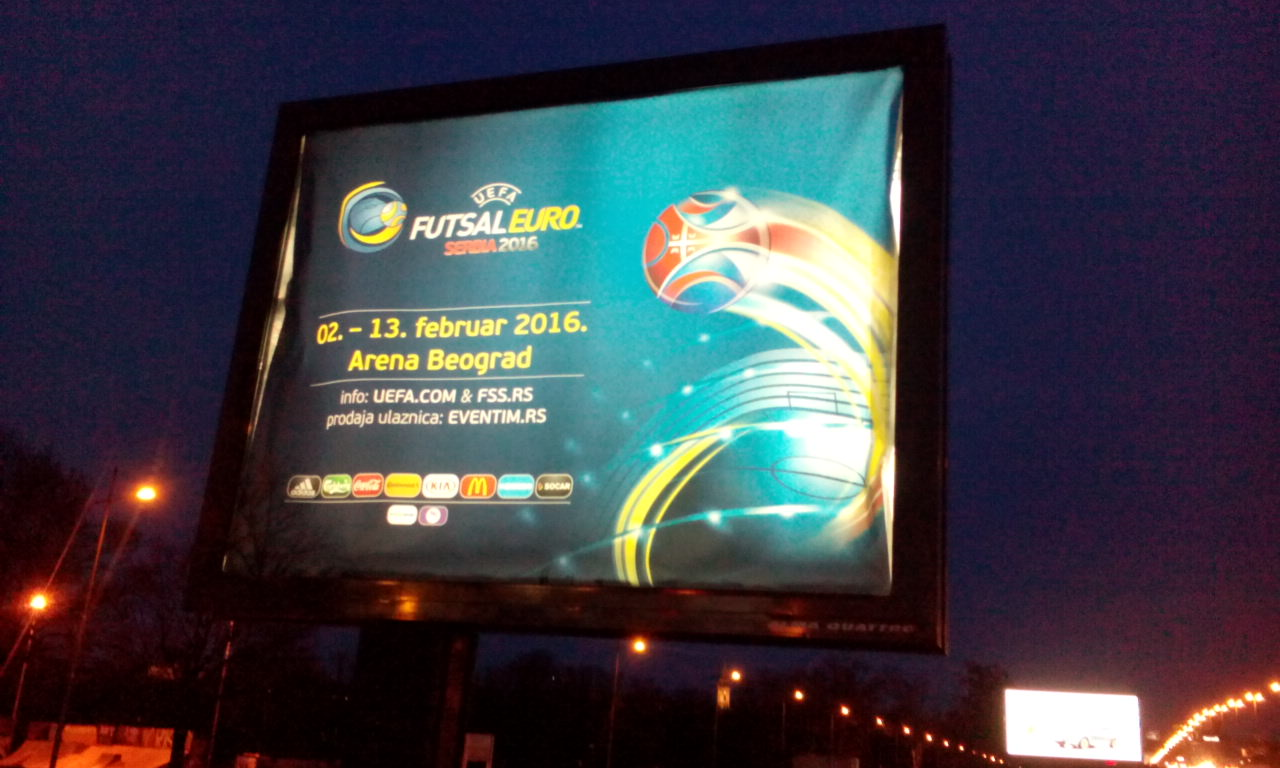
The 2016 UEFA Futsal Championship promotional billboard, featuring an alternative Arena name. During the course of the championship, Arena has been renamed from "Kombank Arena" to "Belgrade Arena", for sponsorship reasons.

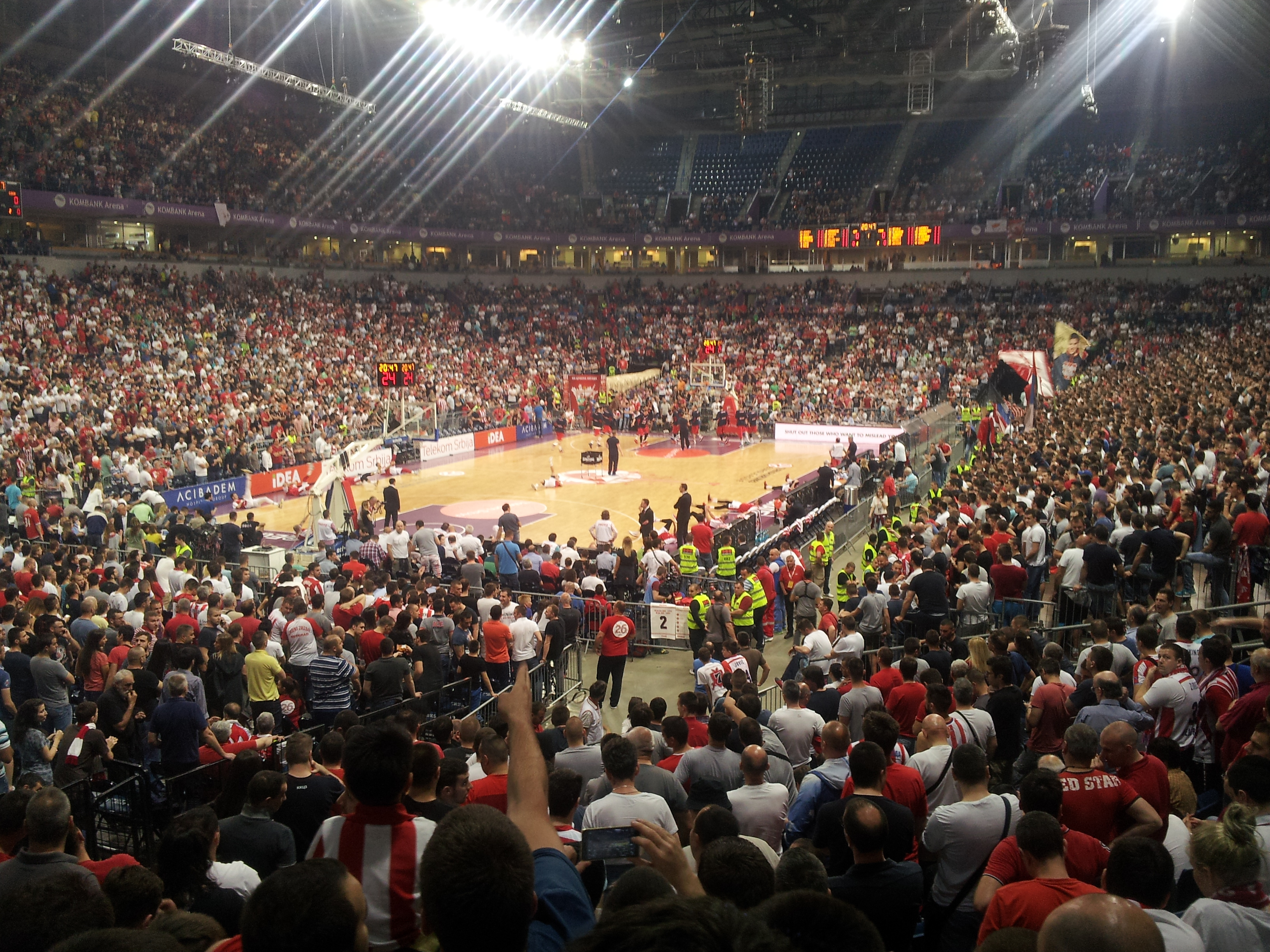
April 18, 2016: Crvena zvezda vs. CSKA Moscow, 2016 Euroleague Playoffs match.

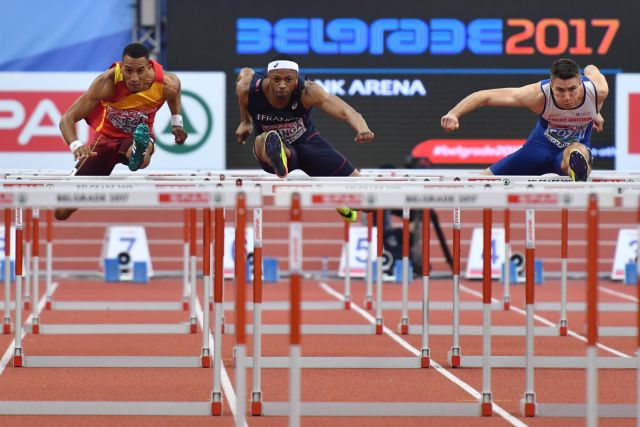
3–5 March 2017: The 2017 European Athletics Indoor Championships has been held in the Arena.

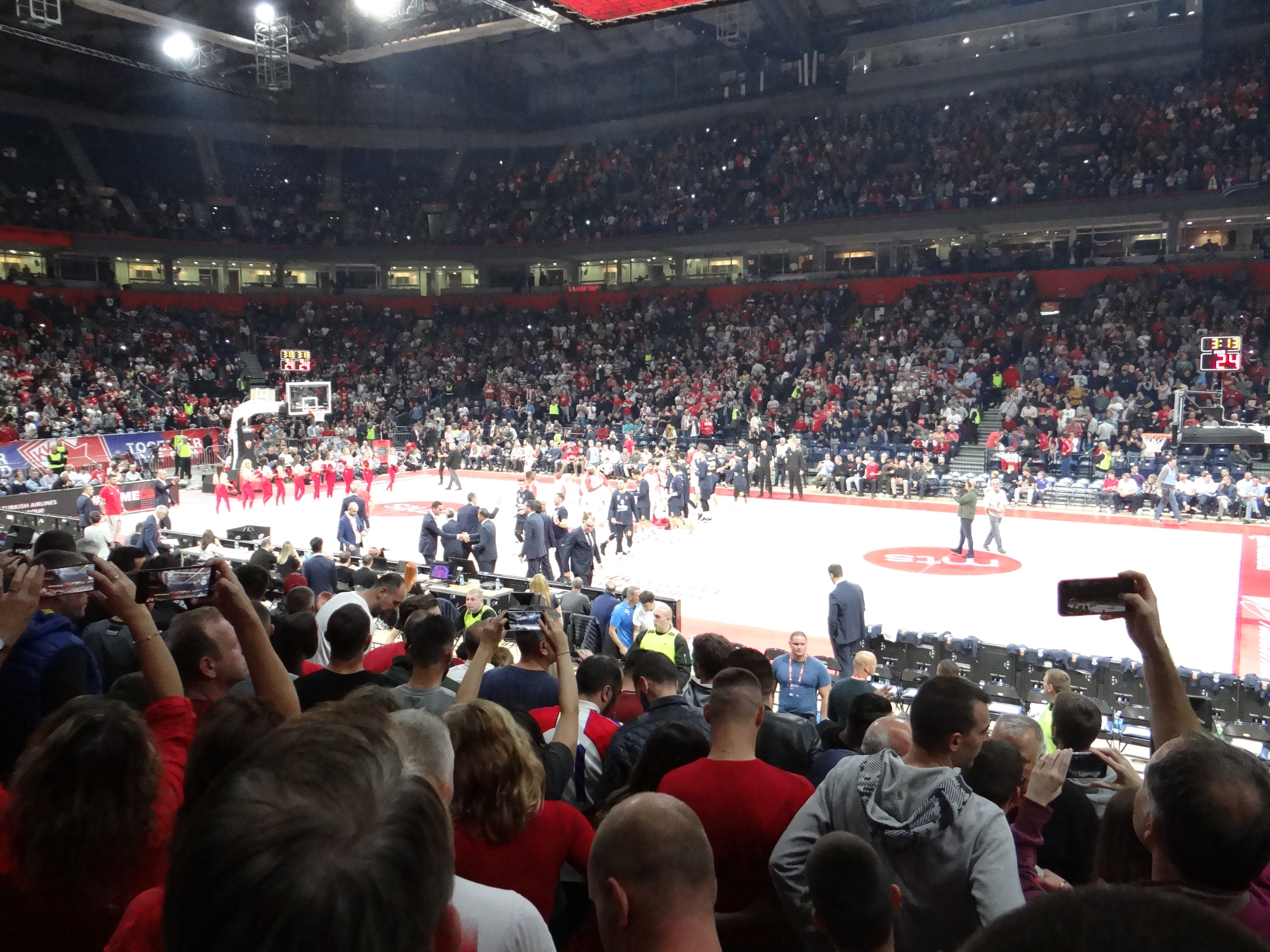
10 October 2019: Crvena zvezda vs. Fenerbahçe, 2019–20 EuroLeague Regular Season match.

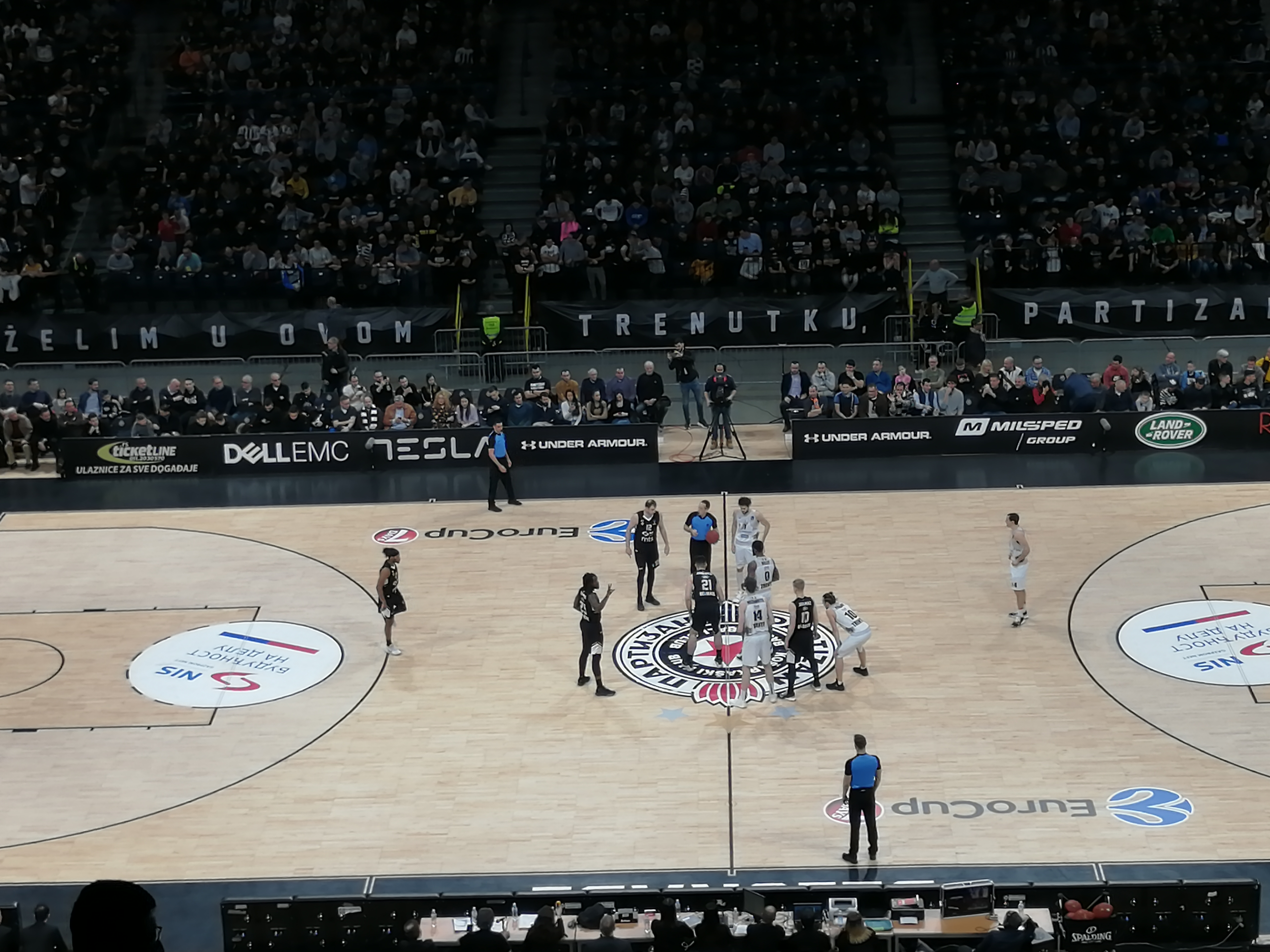
3 March 2020: Partizan vs. Aquila Trento, 2019–20 EuroCup Top 16 match.

Date	Event	Notes
September 20, 2000	SPS / JUL	Final Slobodan Milošević 2000 presidential election campaign rally, the construction of the Arena wasn't finished at that time
July 31, 2004	Official opening of the Belgrade Arena	Bora Stanković, Secretary-General Emeritus of FIBA, officially opened the Arena.
July 31 to August 3, 2004	2004 FIBA Diamond Ball	Basketball tournament. Participants: Angola, Argentina, Australia, China, Lithuania and Serbia-Montenegro
August 6, 2004	Serbia-Montenegro vs. United States	Basketball friendly match
July 8 to July 10, 2005	2005 Volleyball World League Final Four	Volleyball tournament. The final match between Serbia and Montenegro and Brazil was the first sold-out event in the Arena, with attendance of 18,140. The lower capacity of the Arena was caused by the removal of the seats on Level 100 East and Level 100 West.
September 2 to September 7, 2005	2005 Men's European Volleyball Championship	Volleyball tournament, jointly hosted by Serbo-Montenegrin and Italian capitals Belgrade and Rome.
September 22 to September 25, 2005	European Basketball Championship (EuroBasket 2005)	Basketball tournament. Quarter-finals, semi-finals and final match have been held at the Arena.
October 2, 2005	David Copperfield	American illusionist, David Copperfield: An Intimate Evening of Grand Illusion
October 15 to October 16, 2005	Zdravko Čolić	Serbian pop singer
October 28, 2005	Phil Collins	English pop singer, First Final Farewell Tour
November 15, 2005	Andrea Bocelli	Italian tenor
November 6, 2006	50 Cent	American hip hop performer, the first event in the Arena after gaining permanent working permit
December 23, 2006	Bajaga i Instruktori	Serbian rock band
January 16, 2007	SRS	2007 parliamentary election campaign rally
January 17, 2007	DSS / NS	Final 2007 parliamentary election campaign rally
January 18, 2007	DS	Final 2007 parliamentary election campaign rally
February 14, 2007	Toše Proeski	Macedonian pop singer
March 8, 2007	Željko Samardžić	Serbian pop-folk singer
March 10, 2007	Riblja Čorba	Serbian rock band
March 25 to April 1, 2007	2007 European Table Tennis Championships	Table tennis tournament
April 6 to April 8, 2007	2007 European Judo Championships	Judo tournament
April 17, 2007	Busta Rhymes	American hip hop performer
April 20, 2007	Željko Joksimović	Serbian pop-folk singer
May 12, 2007	Night of the Jumps	Freestyle motocross exhibition showcase
May 19, 2007	Van Gogh	Serbian rock band
June 1, 2007	Gipsy Kings	French flamenco band
June 13, 2007	The Chemical Brothers	English electronic duo
June 19, 2007	Kaiser Chiefs	English indie rock band
July 22, 2007	European Youth Olympic Festival	Opening ceremonies
July 27, 2007	European Youth Olympic Festival	Closing ceremonies
September 21 to September 23, 2007	2007 Davis Cup World Group play-offs, Serbia vs. Australia	Tennis match
October 7, 2007	Muse	English rock band, Black Holes and Revelations Tour
November 9, 2007	Joe Cocker	English blues singer
November 24, 2007	Rihanna	Barbadian pop singer, Good Girl Gone Bad Tour
December 7, 2007	NAJJ Srbije	Tennis exhibition showcase (Novak Djokovic, Ana Ivanovic, Jelena Janković, Janko Tipsarević)
December 10, 2007	Miroslav Ilić	Serbian folk singer
December 21 to December 23, 2007	Peter Pan on Ice	Holiday on Ice show
December 27, 2007	Zvezde Granda 2007	New Year's concert
January 12, 2008	Lord of the Ring	K-1 and MMA fighting showcase: Denis Stojnić vs. Goce Candovski; Semmy Schilt vs. Nandor Guelmino; Valentijn Overeem vs. Saša Lazić
January 15, 2008	SRS	Tomislav Nikolić 2008 presidential election campaign rally
January 17, 2008	DS	Boris Tadić 2008 presidential election campaign rally
January 31, 2008	SRS	Tomislav Nikolić 2008 presidential election campaign rally (2nd round)
February 23, 2008	José Carreras	Spanish tenor
March 4, 2008	Chris Rea	English rock singer
March 8, 2008	Željko Samardžić	Serbian pop-folk singer
March 30, 2008	DSS / NS	2008 parliamentary and municipal election campaign rally (introduction of electoral list)
April 5, 2008	SPS / PUPS / JS	2008 parliamentary and municipal election campaign rally (introduction of electoral list)
May 20, 2008	2008 Eurovision Song Contest	First semi-final evening
May 22, 2008	2008 Eurovision Song Contest	Second semi-final evening
May 24, 2008	2008 Eurovision Song Contest	Final evening
May 28, 2008	Lord of the Dance	Irish musical and dance production
June 4, 2008	Nick Cave and the Bad Seeds	Australian rock band, Dig, Lazarus, Dig!!! promotional tour
June 9, 2008	Julio Iglesias	Spanish pop singer
June 10, 2008	Mark Knopfler	British guitarist
July 2, 2008	Tuborg Green Fest 2008	Performers: E-Play, The Raveonettes, Cypress Hill, Franz Ferdinand
July 24, 2008	Lenny Kravitz	American rock singer
August 27, 2008	FIBA EuroBasket 2009 qualification, Serbia vs. Hungary	Basketball match
September 3, 2008	FIBA EuroBasket 2009 qualification, Serbia vs. Bulgaria	Basketball match
September 6, 2008	FIBA EuroBasket 2009 qualification, Serbia vs. Italy	Basketball match
September 7, 2008	RBD	Mexican pop band, Empezar desde Cero Tour 2008
September 17, 2008	FIBA EuroBasket 2009 qualification, Serbia vs. Finland	Basketball match
September 27, 2008	Night of the Jumps	Freestyle motocross exhibition showcase
October 5, 2008	Joy of Europe	Youth festival, gala concert
October 11, 2008	Alicia Keys	American contemporary R&B singer, As I Am Tour
October 29, 2008	Queen + Paul Rodgers	British rock band, Rock the Cosmos Tour
October 29 to October 30, 2008	European Arenas Association congress	Business congress
October 31, 2008	Novi fosili	Croatian pop band
November 3, 2008	Aca Lukas	Serbian turbo-folk singer
November 8, 2008	Jean Michel Jarre	French composer, Oxygene 30th Anniversary Tour
November 29, 2008	The No Smoking Orchestra	Serbian world music band
December 18, 2008	RBD	Mexican pop band, Gira Del Adios World Tour
December 21, 2008	Dida čarolija	Children's music competition
December 26 to December 28, 2008	Bugs Bunny on Ice	Holiday on Ice show
December 31, 2008	Telenor Countdown 2009	New Year celebration, performers: Junior Jack & Kid Crème, Tom Novy, and Seamus Haji
January 2 to January 22, 2009	Oriflame Magic Skate Rink	Public ice rink
January 25, 2009	Zlatna gruda – zemlja koju volim	Agricultural congress
February 7 to February 8, 2009	2009 Fed Cup World Group II, Serbia vs. Japan	Tennis match. The attendance of 15,118 set an all-time record for an ITF event.
February 10, 2009	Iron Maiden	British heavy metal band, Somewhere Back in Time World Tour
February 14, 2009	Ennio Morricone with Roma Sinfonietta	Italian composer, Guitar Art Festival
February 25, 2009	Pussycat Dolls	American pop girl group, Doll Domination Tour
March 5, 2009	Euroleague 2008–09 Top 16 stage, Partizan vs. Panathinaikos	Basketball match. The attendance of 22,567 set an all-time record for the EuroLeague.
March 8, 2009	Željko Samardžić	Serbian pop-folk singer
March 26, 2009	Il Divo	Multinational operatic pop vocal group
March 31, 2009	Euroleague 2008–09 Quarterfinals, Partizan vs. CSKA	Basketball match
April 8 to April 9, 2009	Career Days	Job fair
April 16 to April 18, 2009	2008–09 ABA NLB League Final Four	Basketball tournament; participants: Cibona, Crvena zvezda, Hemofarm, Partizan.
May 7, 2009	Mile Kitić	Serbian folk singer
May 9, 2009	David Guetta (with special guest Kelly Rowland)	French house DJ
May 16, 2009	Chinese national circus presents Confucius	Circus performance
May 22, 2009	Enrique Iglesias	Spanish-Filipino pop singer
May 24, 2009	Macy Gray	American contemporary R&B singer
June 12, 2009	WWE Raw	Professional wrestling event (Randy Orton, Triple H, Bautista, John Cena, The Big Show, The Miz, Kelly Kelly)
June 17, 2009	Slipknot	American metal band, All Hope Is Gone World Tour
June 20, 2009	Zvezde Granda 2008–2009 final	Talent show / singing contest
July 1 to July 12, 2009	2009 Summer Universiade	Multi-sport event: Opening and closing ceremonies; basketball tournament
July 22 to July 26, 2009	2009 FIVB Volleyball World League final round	Volleyball tournament. The attendance of 22,680 at the final match between Serbia and Brazil was the highest one for a sporting venue in the Arena.
August 29, 2009	Belgrade Foam Fest	Dance event; performers: Sandy Rivera, David Morales, Benny Benassi, Marko Nastić, Marko Milosavljević, Tom Pooks, Tsuyoshi Suzuki, Ian F, Andrew Technique, F. Sonik, Tomy DeClerque
September 2, 2009	Leonard Cohen	Canadian singer-songwriter
September 18 to September 20, 2009	2009 Davis Cup World Group play-offs, Serbia vs. Uzbekistan	Tennis match
October 3, 2009	Antonis Remos	Greek singer
October 17, 2009	Severina Vučković	Croatian pop singer
October 18, 2009	ZZ Top	American rock band, Necessity is a Mother Tour
October 31, 2009	Riblja Čorba	Serbian rock band
November 5, 2009	Eros Ramazzotti	Italian pop singer
November 10, 2009	Underworld	English electronic duo
November 11, 2009	Simple Minds	Scottish rock band, Graffiti Soul Tour
November 13, 2009	Tom Jones	Welsh pop singer
November 28, 2009	Van Gogh	Serbian rock band
December 4 to December 6, 2009	Mickey & Minnie's Amazing Journey	Disney on Ice show
December 11, 2009	Haris Džinović	Bosnian folk singer
December 15, 2009	Backstreet Boys	American boy band, This Is Us Tour
December 25 to December 27, 2009	Mystery	Holiday on Ice show
February 6 to February 7, 2010	2010 Fed Cup World Group, Serbia vs. Russia	Tennis match
February 10, 2010	Air	French electronic music duo
February 14, 2010	Tony Cetinski	Croatian pop singer
February 26, 2010	Spandau Ballet	British new romantic band
March 5 to March 7, 2010	2010 Davis Cup World Group, Serbia vs. United States	Tennis match
March 20, 2010	Rammstein	German industrial metal band, Liebe ist für alle da Tour
March 27, 2010	Plavi orkestar	Bosnian pop band
March 28, 2010	Tokio Hotel	German teen pop band
March 30, 2010	Euroleague 2009–10 Quarterfinals, Partizan vs. Maccabi Tel Aviv	Basketball match
April 1, 2010	Euroleague 2009–10 Quarterfinals, Partizan vs. Maccabi Tel Aviv	Basketball match
April 9 to April 11, 2010	Walking with Dinosaurs − The Arena Spectacular	Theatrical show
April 10 to August 19, 2010	CSI: The Experience	Forensic science and technology interactive exhibition
April 24 to April 25, 2010	2010 Fed Cup World Group play-offs, Serbia vs. Slovakia	Tennis match
May 8, 2010	David Guetta	French house DJ
May 11, 2010	Marija Šerifović	Serbian pop singer
May 15, 2010	Jelena Karleuša	Serbian pop singer
May 29, 2010	Džej Ramadanovski	Serbian folk singer
June 3, 2010	Elton John	English pop rock singer
June 6, 2010	Bob Dylan	American rock singer, Never Ending Tour
June 9, 2010	Eric Clapton and Steve Winwood	English blues-rock duo
June 12 to June 13, 2010	Wedding Fair	Business fair
June 25, 2010	Massive Attack	British trip hop duo
June 29 to July 4, 2010	Mamma Mia!	British jukebox musical
August 22, 2010	Serbia vs. China	Basketball friendly match
August 28, 2010	Belgrade Foam Fest	Dance event; performers: Axwell, Sebastian Ingrosso, Stereo Palma, Marko Nastić, DJ Groover, Ultimate Grooves, DJ Kizami, The BeatShakers, DeeJay Playa
September 17 to September 19, 2010	2010 Davis Cup World Group, Serbia vs. Czech Republic	Tennis match
September 23, 2010	Guns N' Roses	American rock band, Chinese Democracy Tour Series, opening acts: Danko Jones and Night Shift
October 2, 2010	Kiki Lesendrić & Piloti	Serbian rock band; Opening act: Fit, Croatian rock band
October 16 to October 17, 2010	Parni Valjak	Croatian rock band
October 18 to October 19, 2010	Shooting of Lockout, a film by Luc Besson	Film production
October 23, 2010	Seka Aleksić	Serbian turbo-folk singer
October 27 to October 31, 2010	2010 World Karate Championships	Karate tournament
November 3 to November 4, 2010	Aca Lukas	Serbian turbo-folk singer
November 7, 2010	SNS	Changes for Serbia political convention
November 17, 2010	Gotan Project	French musical group
November 24 to November 28, 2010	Saltimbanco	Cirque du Soleil show
December 3 to December 5, 2010	2010 Davis Cup World Group final, Serbia vs. France	Tennis match
December 10, 2010	Sergej Ćetković	Montenegrin pop singer
December 17, 2010	BP Party	Performers: Kool & the Gang, David Morales
December 18, 2010	The Night of the AdEaters	Advertising show
December 20, 2010	Anahí	Mexican pop singer, Mi Delirio World Tour
December 23, 2010	Aca Lukas	Serbian turbo-folk singer
December 31, 2010	New Year celebration	Performers: Haris Džinović and Vlado Georgiev
January 26, 2011	Euroleague 2010-11 Top 16 Group G, Partizan vs. Efes Pilsen Istanbul	Basketball match
February 1 to April 3, 2011	Gradić za decu	Physical model exhibition
February 3, 2011	Euroleague 2010-11 Top 16 Group G, Partizan vs. Montepaschi Siena	Basketball match
February 18 to February 20, 2011	Aladdin on Ice	Holiday on Ice show
February 24, 2011	Euroleague 2010-11 Top 16 Group G, Partizan vs. Real Madrid	Basketball match
February 27, 2011	Vanessa-Mae	British violinist
March 6, 2011	Troya	Fire of Anatolia show
March 8, 2011	Željko Samardžić	Serbian pop-folk singer; guest: Jelena Rozga
March 22, 2011	Faithless	British electronica band; Opening act: Inje, Serbian electropop band
April 1, 2011	Tap 011	Serbian pop band
April 10, 2011	Guano Apes	German alternative rock band; Opening act: Rare, Serbian alternative rock band
May 9, 2011	Shakira	Colombian pop singer, The Sun Comes Out World Tour
May 21, 2011	Sensation	Dance event; performers: Sander van Doorn, Sebastian Ingrosso, Fedde le Grand, MC Gee, Mr. White, DJ Chuckie
May 25, 2011	Hurts	British synthpop duo; Opening act: Inje, Serbian electropop band
May 29, 2011	Joe Cocker	English blues singer
June 4, 2011	The Cult	British rock band
June 8, 2011	Sting	English rock singer, Symphonicity Tour
June 18, 2011	Zvezde Granda 2011 final	Talent show / singing contest
July 1, 2011	Whitesnake and Judas Priest	English heavy metal and rock bands; Opening acts: Malehookers, Croatian rock band, and Atlantida, Serbian rock band; Epitaph World Tour
July 6, 2011	Carlos Santana	Mexican-American rock guitarist; Opening act: Jimmy Cliff, Jamaican ska and reggae musician
July 31, 2011	Slash	British-American rock guitarist, opening act: Tea Break, Serbian rock group
September 3, 2011	Amstel Foam Fest	Dance event; performers: Antoine Clamaran, Tom Novy, Cristian Varela, DJ Reeplee, Marko Nastić, Dejan Milićević, Kizami, Mirko & Meex, Playa, Deep House Lounge
September 16 to September 18, 2011	2011 Davis Cup World Group, Serbia vs. Argentina	Tennis match
September 20, 2011	Bryan Ferry	British rock singer
September 23, 2011	Fatboy Slim	British DJ
October 8, 2011	Volim devedesete	Dance/Turbo-folk music festival; performers: Dobar Loš Zao, Ella B, Oliver Stoiljković, Energija, Emilija Kokić, Leontina, W-ICE & Mystic, Ivana Banfić, Vlatka Pokos, May Day, Niggor, Dača Duck, Beat Street, Baki B3, Funky G, Models, Knez, Dr. Iggy, Gru, Ivan Gavrilović.
October 10, 2011	Jean-Michel Jarre	French composer, Indoors arena tour
October 20 to October 21, 2011	Lepa Brena	Yugoslav folk singer, Začarani krug tour
October 26, 2011	Boris Berezovsky	Russian virtuoso pianist, official closing of the 43rd BEMUS.
October 30, 2011	Sade	English soul band, Sade Live Tour
November 3, 2011	Aca Lukas	Serbian turbo-folk singer
November 6, 2011	Montserrat Caballé	Spanish operatic soprano
November 13, 2011	URS	Political party convention; speakers: Mlađan Dinkić, Milan Panić, Maja Gojković, Veroljub Stevanović, Boško Ničić, Franz Schausberger, Miroslav Čučković, Goran Paskaljević, Mirko Nišović
November 18 to November 20, 2011	Princess Wishes: Princesses and Heroes	Disney on Ice show
November 25 to November 27, 2011	Dino Merlin	Bosnian pop-folk singer
December 14, 2011	Edvin Marton and Wiener Johann Strauss Orchester	Austrian orchestra
December 21, 2011	Michalis Hatzigiannis	Cypriot pop singer
December 25, 2011	Čarolija	Children's music festival
December 31, 2011	New Year celebration	Performers: Aca Lukas, Ivana Selakov, Dejan Petrović Orchestra
January 21 to January 29, 2012	2012 European Men's Handball Championship	Handball tournament. Main round and knockout stage have been held in the Arena.
February 14, 2012	Tony Cetinski	Croatian pop singer
February 25, 2012	SRS	Srbija čeka Šešelja rally; speakers: Dragan Todorović, Zoran Krasić, Elena Guskova
February 28, 2012	Wadaiko Yamato	Japanese taiko drummers group
March 6 to March 11, 2012	2012 European Wrestling Championships	Greco-Roman and freestyle wrestling tournament
March 25 to March 28, 2012	20th Maybelline Fashion Selection	Fashion event
April 21, 2012	SPS / PUPS / JS	2012 parliamentary election, local elections and Ivica Dačić presidential election campaign rally.
April 28, 2012	Beogradski Sindikat	Serbian hip-hop group
May 12, 2012	Sensation Innerspace	Dance event; performers: Mr. White, Fedde le Grand, Dennis Ferrer, Daniel Sanchez & Juan Sanchez, Sunnery James & Ryan Marciano, Hardwell.
May 17, 2012	DS	Za sigurniju budućnost, final Boris Tadić 2012 presidential election campaign rally; speakers: Alain Richard, Nenad Čanak, Rasim Ljajić, Srđan Đoković, Milorad Dodik, Dragan Đilas, Boris Tadić.
May 31, 2012	Pink Martini	American crossover music orchestra
June 1, 2012	Zaz	French jazz singer; Opening act: Nouvelle Vague, French cover band.
June 9, 2012	IQ Music Festival	Performers: dreDDup, Mizar, Block Out, Laibach, Marilyn Manson.
June 29 to July 1, 2012	Alegría	Cirque du Soleil show
July 27 to July 29, 2012	Jehovah's Witnesses regional convention	Religious conference
August 18, 2012	FIBA EuroBasket 2013 qualification, Serbia vs. Montenegro	Basketball match
September 1, 2012	Guarana Foam Fest	Dance event; performers: Alex Gaudino, Kurd Maverick, Arno Cost, Darren Emerson, Playa, MC Ricardo L'Rock, Ralph Good, Dave Floyd, DJ Pantelis, Felipe Simo, Milinka Radišić
September 22, 2012	Il Divo	Multinational operatic pop vocal group
October 20, 2012	Lord of the Dance	Irish musical and dance production
October 26, 2012	Nina Badrić	Croatian pop singer; NeBo Tour, guests: Tony Cetinski, Sergej Ćetković, Hari Varešanović, and Željko Joksimović
October 30, 2012	Steve Vai	American guitarist
November 3, 2012	Aca Lukas	Serbian turbo-folk singer
November 8, 2012	The Sleeping Beauty	St. Petersburg Festival Ballet performance
November 15 to November 18, 2012	Let's Celebrate!	Disney on Ice show
November 20, 2012	Jennifer Lopez	American pop singer; Dance Again World Tour
December 4 to December 16, 2012	2012 European Women's Handball Championship	Handball tournament. The attendance of 13,000 at the semifinal match between Serbia and Montenegro set an all-time record for a European Women's Handball Championship match.
December 22, 2012	Prljavo kazalište	Croatian rock band; Opening act: Radio Luksemburg, Croatian rock band.
December 25, 2012	Čarolija	Children's music festival
December 29, 2012	Smak	Serbian rock band
February 7 to February 10, 2013	Mickey's Magic Show	Disney Live show
February 14, 2013	Sergej Ćetković	Montenegrin pop singer
February 23, 2013	Swan Lake on Ice	Imperial Ice Stars show
March 2, 2013	Halid Bešlić	Bosnian folk singer
March 8, 2013	Željko Samardžić	Serbian pop-folk singer
March 23, 2013	Riblja Čorba	Serbian rock band
March 30, 2013	Severina Vučković	Croatian pop singer; Dobrodošao u Klub Tour
April 6, 2013	Masters of Dirt	Freestyle motocross exhibition showcase
April 8, 2013	21 Tošetova pesma za 1 život	Toše Proeski memorial concert; performers: Saša Kovačević, Bojan Marović, Miligram, Boris Režak, Tanja Banjanin, Zana, Vampiri, Saša Vasić, Aleksa Jelić, Ana Štajdohar, Davor Jovanović, Viva Vox.
April 15, 2013	Beyoncé Knowles	American contemporary R&B singer; The Mrs. Carter Show World Tour opening concert
April 28, 2013	Rammstein	German industrial band, Made in Germany 1995–2011 Tour
April 30, 2013	Mark Knopfler	British guitarist
May 10, 2013	Andrea Bocelli	Italian tenor
June 25, 2013	Slayer	American thrash metal band; Opening acts: Rapidforce, Newsted
June 30, 2013	Jamiroquai	British jazz-funk/acid jazz band; Opening act: Svi na pod
July 15, 2013	Eric Burdon	English blues rock singer
August 2 to August 4, 2013	Jehovah's Witnesses regional convention	Religious conference
August 10 to August 11, 2013	Belgrade Trophy	Basketball tournament. Participants: Serbia, Slovenia, Turkey and Ukraine.
August 12, 2013	Serbia vs. Russia	Basketball friendly match
September 1, 2013	Roger Waters	English rock musician; The Wall Live
September 13 to September 15, 2013	2013 Davis Cup World Group semifinals: Serbia vs. Canada	Tennis match
September 21, 2013	Guarana Foam Fest	Dance event; performers: Geo Da Silva, Emil Lassaria & Caitlyn, Ricardo L'Rock, Sasha Lopez, DJ Playa, DJ Pantelis.
September 23, 2013	Vibes	Music festival; performers: Selah Sue, Nina Nesbitt, SevdahBaby.
October 5, 2013	Peter Gabriel	English rock singer
October 12, 2013	Vaya Con Dios	Belgian blues band; Opening act: Duo Moderato
October 17, 2013	Euroleague 2013–14 Regular Season Group D, Crvena zvezda vs. Lokomotiv-Kuban	Basketball match, att.: 19,000
October 19, 2013	Aco Pejović	Serbian pop-folk singer
October 21, 2013	SNS	Political convention; speakers: Tomislav Nikolić, Zorana Mihajlović, Nikola Selaković, Lazar Krstić, Zoran Babić, Aleksandar Vučić.
October 25, 2013	Gibonni	Croatian pop singer; special guest: Steve Stevens.
November 1 to November 3, 2013	Worlds of Fantasy	Disney on Ice show
November 15 to November 17, 2013	2013 Davis Cup World Group final, Serbia vs. Czech Republic	Tennis match
November 23, 2013	Tony Cetinski	Croatian pop singer
November 29 to December 1, 2013	The Illusionists: Witness the Impossible	Illusionist show; performers: Dan Sperry, Jeff Hobson, Andrew Basso, Kevin James, Mark Kalin and Jinger, Philip Escoffey, Brett Daniels, Joaquin Kotkin.
December 5, 2013	Euroleague 2013–14 Regular Season Group A, Partizan vs. Budivelnyk	Basketball match, att.: 15,200
December 12, 2013	Euroleague 2013–14 Regular Season Group D, Crvena zvezda vs. Laboral Kutxa	Basketball match, att.: 7,000
December 15 to December 22, 2013	2013 World Women's Handball Championship	Handball tournament. Eighth-finals, quarter-finals, semi-finals and final match have been held at the Arena. The attendance of 19,467 at the final match between Serbia and Brazil set a world record for indoor matches in the history of women's handball.
December 28, 2013	Neverne Bebe	Serbian pop rock band
January 2, 2014	Euroleague 2013–14 Top 16 Group F, Partizan vs. Real Madrid	Basketball match. The attendance of 21,374 was the all-time second largest for a EuroLeague match.
January 17, 2014	Euroleague 2013–14 Top 16 Group F, Partizan vs. CSKA Moscow	Basketball match, att.: 16,523
January 31, 2014	Euroleague 2013–14 Top 16 Group F, Partizan vs. Lokomotiv-Kuban	Basketball match, att.: 15,565
February 14, 2014	Doris Dragović	Croatian pop singer
February 18, 2014	Deep Purple	English rock band, Now What? World Tour
February 20, 2014	Euroleague 2013–14 Top 16 Group F, Partizan vs. Galatasaray	Basketball match, att.: 13,552
March 2, 2014	SPS / PUPS / JS	2014 parliamentary election campaign rally; speakers: Aleksandar Antić, Petar Đokić, Srđan Milić, Dragan Marković, Milan Krkobabić, Ivica Dačić.
March 6, 2014	Euroleague 2013–14 Top 16 Group F, Partizan vs. Bayern Munich	Basketball match, att.: 11,550
March 8, 2014	Parni Valjak	Croatian rock band
March 15 to March 16, 2014	World of beauty	Cosmetics fair
March 18, 2014	Lord of the Dance	Irish musical and dance production
March 20, 2014	Euroleague 2013–14 Top 16 Group F, Partizan vs. Maccabi Tel Aviv	Basketball match, att: 13,015
March 23, 2014	X Factor Adria 2013–2014 final	Talent show / singing contest
March 26, 2014	2013–14 Eurocup Basketball quarterfinals, Crvena zvezda vs. Budivelnyk	Basketball match. The attendance of 24,232 was the highest one for a sporting event in the Arena and also the highest one for an indoor match in the history of European basketball.
April 2, 2014	2013–14 Eurocup Basketball semifinals, Crvena zvezda vs. UNICS	Basketball match, att.: 22,736
April 4, 2014	Euroleague 2013–14 Top 16 Group F, Partizan vs. Žalgiris	Basketball match, att.: 12,505
April 5, 2014	Dubioza kolektiv	Bosnian hip-hop/reggae/dub band; Opening act: Atheist Rap
April 24 to April 27, 2014	2013–14 ABA League Final Four Tournament	Basketball tournament; participants: Cedevita, Cibona, Crvena zvezda, Partizan.
May 19 to June 2, 2014	2014 Southeast Europe floods emergency shelter	Emergency shelter
June 6, 2014	Vlado Georgiev	Serbian pop singer
June 15, 2014	Tom Jones	Welsh pop singer
July 25 to July 27, 2014	Jehovah's Witnesses regional convention	Religious conference
August 16 to August 17, 2014	Belgrade Trophy	Basketball tournament. Participants: Argentina, Puerto Rico, Serbia and Turkey.
September 24, 2014	Il Divo	Multinational operatic pop vocal group
October 3, 2014	Dragana Mirković	Serbian folk singer
October 11, 2014	The Best of 90s Festival	Eurodance music festival; performers: Snap!, 2 Unlimited, Ace of Base, Technotronic, C+C Music Factory, Snow, La Bouche, Culture Beat.
October 16, 2014	2014–15 Euroleague Regular Season Group D, Crvena zvezda vs. Galatasaray	Basketball match
October 25 to October 26, 2014	The Royal Horse Gala	Classical dressage show
October 30, 2014	Euroleague 2014-15 Regular Season Group D, Crvena zvezda vs. Valencia	Basketball match
November 7, 2014	Euroleague 2014-15 Regular Season Group D, Crvena zvezda vs. Olympiacos	Basketball match
November 11, 2014	Zorica Brunclik	Serbian folk singer, guest: Halid Muslimović
November 27, 2014	Euroleague 2014-15 Regular Season Group D, Crvena zvezda vs. Neptūnas	Basketball match
November 29, 2014	Miligram	Serbian folk band
December 6, 2014	Šaban Haris Ana	Folk music concert
December 8, 2014	Plácido Domingo	Spanish operatic tenor
December 12 to December 13, 2014	Zdravko Čolić	Serbian pop singer
January 2, 2015	2014–15 Euroleague Top 16 Group E, Crvena zvezda vs. Real Madrid	Basketball match
January 16, 2015	2014–15 Euroleague Top 16 Group E, Crvena zvezda vs. Galatasaray	Basketball match
January 30 to February 1, 2015	Ice Age Live! A Mammoth Adventure	Ice show
February 5, 2015	2014–15 Euroleague Top 16 Group E, Crvena zvezda vs. Žalgiris	Basketball match
February 13 to February 15, 2015	X Factor Adria 2015 auditions	Talent show / singing contest
March 5, 2015	2014–15 Euroleague Top 16 Group E, Crvena zvezda vs. Maccabi Tel Aviv	Basketball match
March 19, 2015	2014–15 Euroleague Top 16 Group E, Crvena zvezda vs. Barcelona	Basketball match
May 9, 2015	Viva Vox	Serbian a cappella choir
May 15, 2015	Balkanopolis i prijatelji	Benefit concert; performers: Slobodan Trkulja & Balkanopolis, Mariza, Oleta Adams, Mayssa Karaa, Baaba Maal.
May 26, 2015	Arena Fest: New Divas	Pop music festival; performers: Indila, Sara Jovanović, Nevena Božović, Zemlja gruva.
June 6, 2015	OneRepublic	American pop rock band; Native Tour
June 21, 2015	X Factor Adria 2015 final	Talent show / singing contest
June 28, 2015	20 Beobasket Stars '15	Basketball showcase
June 29 to June 30, 2015	Belgrade Calling	Rock music festival; performers: Judas Priest, Helloween, Toto.
July 1, 2015	Anastacia	American pop singer; Resurrection Tour
August 12, 2015	Serbia vs. France	Basketball friendly match; EuroBasket 2015 trophy tour.
August 15 to August 16, 2015	Belgrade Trophy	Basketball tournament. Participants: China, Russia, Serbia and Venezuela.
October 10 to October 11, 2015	Galeb Belgrade Trophy – Serbia Open	Taekwondo tournament
October 15, 2015	2015–16 Euroleague Regular Season Group A, Crvena zvezda vs. Strasbourg	Basketball match
October 24 to October 25, 2015	Dino Merlin	Bosnian pop-folk singer
October 30, 2015	WAKO 2015 World Kickboxing Championships	Kickboxing tournament (K-1 rules, Low Kick, Kick Light)
November 3, 2015	Aca Lukas	Serbian turbo-folk singer
November 6, 2015	2015–16 Euroleague Regular Season Group A, Crvena zvezda vs. Fenerbahçe	Basketball match
December 3 to December 4, 2015	22nd OSCE Ministerial Council	Intergovernmental organization meeting
December 11, 2015	Željko Joksimović	Serbian pop-folk singer
January 10 to January 23, 2016	2016 Men's and Women's European Water Polo Championship	Water polo tournament. The first time a water polo pool has been installed in the Arena. The construction of the pool began on December 27, 2015. The attendance of 18,473 at the men's final match between Serbia and Montenegro was the highest one in water polo history.
February 2 to February 13, 2016	2016 UEFA Futsal Championship	Futsal tournament. During the course of the championship, Arena has been renamed from "Kombank Arena" to "Belgrade Arena", for sponsorship reasons. The overall attendance of over 100,000 was the highest one in UEFA Futsal Championship history.
February 26 to February 28, 2016	Momentum!	Multi-level marketing event
March 5, 2016	Tony Cetinski	Croatian pop singer
March 8, 2016	Saša Matić	Serbian pop-folk singer
March 11, 2016	2015–16 Euroleague Top 16 Group E, Crvena zvezda vs. Panathinaikos	Basketball match
March 22, 2016	2016 FIFA Futsal World Cup qualification play-offs, Serbia vs. Portugal	Futsal match
March 31, 2016	2015–16 Euroleague Top 16 Group E, Crvena zvezda vs. Darüşşafaka	Basketball match
April 9, 2016	SPS / JS / Greens / KP	2016 parliamentary and municipal election campaign rally; speakers: Srđan Milić, Petar Đokić, Aleksandar Antić, Josip Joška Broz, Ivan Karić, Dragan Marković, Ivica Dačić.
April 16, 2016	Tropico Band	Serbian pop-folk band
April 18, 2016	2015–16 Euroleague Playoffs, Crvena zvezda vs. CSKA Moscow	Basketball match, att: 18,027
April 20, 2016	SNS	Final 2016 parliamentary and municipal election campaign rally
April 23, 2016	Vlado Georgiev	Serbian pop singer
May 10, 2016	Enrique Iglesias	Spanish-Filipino pop singer; Sex and Love Tour
June 25, 2016	Serbia vs. France	Basketball friendly match
June 28, 2016	Serbia vs. Greece	Basketball friendly match
July 4 to July 9, 2016	2016 FIBA World Olympic Qualifying Tournament for Men	Basketball tournament. Participants: Angola, Czech Republic, Japan, Latvia, Puerto Rico and Serbia
September 28, 2016	Toma Zdravković memorial concert	A concert to commemorate the 25th anniversary of death of Serbian pop-folk singer Toma Zdravković (1938–1991); performers: Stevan Anđelković, Enes Begović, Ana Bekuta, Halid Bešlić, Marko Bulat, Bora Đorđević, Snežana Đurišić, Haris Džinović, Goran Gluhaković, Zoran Kalezić, Dragan Kojić Keba, Duško Kuliš, Aca Lukas, Lepa Lukić, Saša Matić, Merima Njegomir, Aco Pejović, Marinko Rokvić, Nikola Rokvić, Šaban Šaulić, Marija Šerifović, Novica Zdravković, Legende; hosts: Vanja Bulić, Danica Maksimović.
October 8 to October 9, 2016	World Championships in Counter-Strike: Global Offensive	Computer gaming competition
October 26, 2016	Euroleague 2016–17 Regular Season, Crvena zvezda vs. Barcelona	Basketball match, att: 18,150
November 4, 2016	Euroleague 2016–17 Regular Season, Crvena zvezda vs. Baskonia	Basketball match, att: 16,578
November 11, 2016	Vivaldianno – The City of Mirrors	Classical music concert, based on the works by Antonio Vivaldi
November 17, 2016	Euroleague 2016–17 Regular Season, Crvena zvezda vs. EA7 Emporio Armani Milan	Basketball match, att: 10,279
November 19, 20, and 26, 2016	Bijelo Dugme	Yugoslav rock band
December 23 to December 25, 2016	Peter Pan on Ice	The Russian Ice Stars show
December 29, 2016	Euroleague 2016–17 Regular Season, Crvena zvezda vs. CSKA Moscow	Basketball match, att: 18,487
December 30, 2016	Đorđe Balašević	Serbian pop singer
February 25, 2017	2017 Balkan Athletics Indoor Championships	Track and field competition
March 3 to March 5, 2017	2017 European Athletics Indoor Championships	Track and field competition
March 22, 2017	2016–17 EuroLeague Regular Season, Crvena zvezda vs. Olympiakos	Basketball match, att: 18,170
March 24, 2017	SNS	Aleksandar Vučić 2017 presidential election campaign rally; speakers: Gerhard Schröder, Péter Szijjártó, Pyotr Tolstoy, Lazar Ristovski, Ivica Dačić, Tomislav Nikolić, Aleksandar Vučić.
March 25, 2017	2Cellos	Slovenian-Croatian cello duo
March 31, 2017	2016–17 EuroLeague Regular Season, Crvena zvezda vs. UNICS	Basketball match, att: 9,332
April 22 to April 23, 2017	Masha and the Bear on Ice	Ice show
April 29, 2017	Aca Lukas	Serbian turbo-folk singer
May 26, 2017	Arena Dance Club	Dance event; performers: Mahmut Orhan, Carla's Dreams, Marko Španac, Rosske.
July 1, 2017	Chick Corea Elektric Band	American jazz fusion band
September 17, 2017	Sting	English rock musician; 57th & 9th Tour
October 7, 2017	Naj njuška Beograda	Conformation show
October 13 to October 15, 2017	Worlds of Enchantment	Disney on Ice show
October 26, 2017	2017–18 EuroLeague Regular Season, Crvena zvezda vs. Maccabi Tel Aviv	Basketball match, att: 8,230
October 28, 2017	Nick Cave and the Bad Seeds	Australian rock band
November 2, 2017	2017–18 EuroLeague Regular Season, Crvena zvezda vs. Brose Bamberg	Basketball match, att: 5,892
November 15, 2017	2017–18 EuroLeague Regular Season, Crvena zvezda vs. CSKA	Basketball match, att: 13,467
November 23, 2017	2017–18 EuroLeague Regular Season, Crvena zvezda vs. Baskonia	Basketball match, att: 5,467
November 24, 2017	Luis Fonsi	Puerto Rican Latin pop singer; Love + Dance World Tour
November 25, 2017	Zlatna rukavica	International boxing tournament, 60th edition; final fights
December 12, 2017	Kosovo je srce Srbije – Rodoljubima	Serbian folk music concert; Participants: Ana Bekuta, Snežana Đurišić, Miroslav Ilić, Čeda Marković, Vera Matović, Miša Mijatović Orchestra, Dejan Nedić Tejovac, Dragica Radosavljević Cakana, Šaban Šaulić, Mira Škorić, Radiša Urošević, Ivana Žigon and Kosovski Božuri.
December 15 to December 17, 2017	Beauty and the Beast on Ice	The Russian Ice Stars show
December 30, 2017	Đorđe Balašević	Serbian pop singer
February 24, 2018	Kraftwerk	German electronic music band
March 8 to March 9, 2018	Saša Matić	Serbian pop-folk singer
April 12, 2018	Collision Fighting League	Mixed martial arts and K-1 tournament
April 14, 2018	Seka Aleksić	Serbian turbo-folk singer
April 21, 2018	Dara Bubamara	Serbian turbo-folk singer
May 18 to May 20, 2018	2018 EuroLeague Final Four	Basketball tournament; participants: CSKA Moscow, Žalgiris, Real Madrid, Fenerbahçe.
May 24, 2018	Marija Šerifović	Serbian pop singer
June 3, 2018	Collision Fighting League	Mixed martial arts and K-1 tournament
June 10, 2018	Scorpions	German rock band; Crazy World Tour; Opening act: Divlje jagode; rescheduled from December 7, 2017, to June 10, 2018, due to singer Klaus Meine's illness
September 7, 2018	Bryan Ferry	British rock singer
September 15, 2018	Rasta	Serbian trap/reggaeton/pop-folk singer
October 6, 2018	Šaban Šaulić	Serbian folk singer
October 20 to October 21, 2018	Lepa Brena	Yugoslav folk singer, Zar je važno da l' se peva ili pjeva... World Tour
October 26, 2018	2018–19 ABA League Regular Season, Partizan vs. Zadar	Basketball match, att: 7,920
October 28, 2018	Jason Derulo	American pop singer
November 2, 2018	Maya Berović	Bosnian pop-folk singer
November 4, 2018	Serbia RUN 10k/5k	Long-distance race finish line
November 22, 2018	Aco Pejović	Serbian pop-folk singer
December 1, 2018	Bajaga i Instruktori	Serbian pop-rock band
December 7 to December 9, 2018	Snow White and the Seven Dwarfs on Ice	The Russian Ice Stars show
December 15, 2018	Goran Bregović	Bosnian world music guitarist
December 17, 2018	Aco Pejović	Serbian pop-folk singer
December 22, 2018	Huawei Mate Black & White 2018	Trance music festival. Performers: W&W, Paul van Dyk, Sandy Rivera, Girl Panic
December 31, 2018	New Year celebration	Performers: Aca Lukas, Jala Brat, Buba Corelli
January 29, 2019	Huawei MAC	Music awards ceremony
March 8, 2019	Đani	Serbian folk singer
April 11, 2019	2020 European Men's Handball Championship qualification, Serbia vs. Croatia	Handball match, att: 7,959
April 12, 2019	Serbia vs. Brazil	Futsal friendly match
May 3 to May 5, 2019	Walking with Dinosaurs − The Arena Spectacular	Theatrical show
May 22, 2019	André Rieu and the Johann Strauss Orchestra	Dutch violinist and conductor
May 24 to May 26, 2019	European Kendo Championships 2019	Kendo tournament
June 26, 2019	Radio Belgrade 202 50th anniversary	Rock music concert; Participants: Bajaga i Instruktori, Van Gogh, Neno Belan & Fiumens, YU Grupa, Neverne Bebe, Artan Lili, Zemlja gruva, Dejan Cukić & Spori Ritam.
July 2 to July 7, 2019	FIBA Women's EuroBasket 2019	Basketball tournament, jointly hosted by Serbia and Latvia. Knockout phase of the tournament has been held at the Arena.
August 10, 2019	Serbia vs. Lithuania	Basketball friendly match, att: 18,150
September 19, 2019	Partizan vs. AEK	Basketball friendly match, att: 2,500
September 24, 2019	Eros Ramazzotti	Italian pop singer
October 8, 2019	2019–20 EuroCup, Partizan vs. Tofaş	Basketball match, att: 8,085
October 10, 2019	2019–20 EuroLeague Regular Season, Crvena zvezda vs. Fenerbahçe	Basketball match, att: 16,879
November 1 to November 3, 2019	Disney on Ice	Disney on Ice show
November 5, 2019	2019–20 EuroCup, Partizan vs. Reyer Venezia	Basketball match, att: 9,124
November 7, 2019	2019–20 EuroLeague Regular Season, Crvena zvezda vs. Real Madrid	Basketball match, att: 16,457
November 9, 2019	Parni Valjak	Croatian rock band
November 10, 2019	Bryan Adams	Canadian pop musician, Shine a Light Tour
November 15, 2019	2019–20 EuroLeague Regular Season, Crvena zvezda vs. ASVEL	Basketball match, att: 10,894
November 17, 2019	2019–20 ABA League Regular Season, Partizan vs. Crvena zvezda	Basketball match, att: 9,268
November 20, 2019	2019–20 EuroCup, Partizan vs. Rytas Vilnius	Basketball match, att: 7,940
November 23, 2019	Severina Vučković	Croatian pop singer; The Magic Tour
November 29 to November 30, 2019	Zdravko Čolić	Serbian pop singer
December 1, 2019	2019–20 ABA League Regular Season, Partizan vs. Krka	Basketball match, att: 2,469
December 6, 2019	Deep Purple	English rock band, The Long Goodbye Tour
December 9, 2019	Megdan 21. veka	MMA showcase
December 12, 2019	2019–20 EuroLeague Regular Season, Crvena zvezda vs. Baskonia	Basketball match, att: 10,367
December 13 to December 14, 2019	Zdravko Čolić	Serbian pop singer
December 15, 2019	2019–20 ABA League Regular Season, Partizan vs. Cibona	Basketball match, att: 3,908
December 18, 2019	2019–20 EuroCup, Partizan vs. Limoges	Basketball match, att: 4,530
December 20, 2019	2019–20 EuroLeague Regular Season, Crvena zvezda vs. Olympiacos	Basketball match, att: 8,076
December 21, 2019	2019–20 ABA League Regular Season, Partizan vs. Igokea	Basketball match, att: 2,507
December 27 to December 28, 2019	Zdravko Čolić	Serbian pop singer
December 29, 2019	2019–20 ABA League Regular Season, Partizan vs. Koper Primorska	Basketball match, att: 5,010
January 2, 2020	2019–20 EuroLeague Regular Season, Crvena zvezda vs. Bayern Munich	Basketball match, att: 16,824
January 4, 2020	2019–20 ABA League Regular Season, Partizan vs. Mornar	Basketball match, att: 5,266
January 8, 2020	2019–20 EuroCup Top 16, Partizan vs. Virtus Bologna	Basketball match, att: 16,505
January 11, 2020	2019–20 ABA League Regular Season, Partizan vs. Cedevita Olimpija	Basketball match
January 15, 2020	2019–20 EuroLeague Regular Season, Crvena zvezda vs. Žalgiris	Basketball match
January 17, 2020	2019–20 EuroLeague Regular Season, Crvena zvezda vs. Alba Berlin	Basketball match
January 28, 2020	2019–20 EuroCup Top 16, Partizan vs. Darüşşafaka	Basketball match
February 14, 2020	Nataša Bekvalac	Serbian pop-folk singer
March 3, 2020	2019–20 EuroCup Top 16, Partizan vs. Aquila Trento	Basketball match
March 8, 2020	Lexington Band	Serbian pop band
July 6, 2020 to May 21, 2021	Temporary COVID-19 hospital	Temporary hospital established during the course of the COVID-19 pandemic in Serbia.
August 18 to September 4, 2021	2021 Women's European Volleyball Championship	The first event held in the Arena since the beginning of the COVID-19 pandemic in Serbia. Volleyball tournament; co-hosted by Serbia, Croatia, Bulgaria and Romania. Pool A and the knockout phase of the tournament was held at the Arena. The attendance of 20,565 at the final match between Serbia and Italy sets an all-time record of attendance in women's volleyball.
September 16, 2021	Partizan vs. Anadolu Efes	Basketball friendly match; Novica Veličković final game
October 9, 2021	2021–22 ABA League Regular Season, Partizan vs. SC Derby	Basketball match
October 24 to November 6, 2021	2021 AIBA Men's World Boxing Championships	Amateur boxing competition
December 3 to December 5, 2021	Fair of Certified Used Cars	Auto show
March 18 to March 20, 2022	2022 World Athletics Indoor Championships	Track and field competition
April 14, 2022	Aca Lukas	Serbian turbo-folk singer
May 12, 2022	Dead Can Dance	Australian music duo
May 23, 2022	2Cellos	Croatian cellist duo
May 24, 2022	Iron Maiden	English heavy metal band, Legacy of the Beast World Tour
October 22, 2022	Lara Fabian	Canadian-Belgian pop singer
November 3, 2022	Aca Lukas	Serbian turbo-folk singer
November 11, 2022	Petar Grašo	Croatian pop singer
November 24, 2022	André Rieu and the Johann Strauss Orchestra	Dutch violinist and conductor
December 10 to December 11, 2022	Miroslav Ilić	Serbian folk singer
March 8 to March 9, 2023	Saša Matić	Serbian pop-folk singer
April 7, 2023	Jelena Rozga	Croatian pop singer; Minut Srca Mog Tour
April 21, 2023	Eros Ramazzotti	Italian pop singer
June 25, 2023	Scorpions	German rock band
September 28 to September 30, 2023	Aleksandra Prijović	Serbian pop-folk singer; Od istoka do zapada Tour
October 20, 2023	Gibonni	Croatian pop singer
October 22, 2023	Gibonni	Croatian pop singer
October 24, 2023	Hauser	Croatian cellist
October 28, 2023	Il Divo	Multinational operatic pop vocal group
November 3, 2023	Aca Lukas	Serbian turbo-folk singer; Pokidan film premiere
November 18 to November 19, 2023	Dino Merlin	Bosnian pop-folk singer
November 21 to November 22, 2023	Dino Merlin	Bosnian pop-folk singer
December 12, 2023	Bryan Adams	Canadian pop musician
December 23, 2023	Milica Pavlović	Serbian pop-folk singer
February 16 to February 17, 2024	Dragana Mirković	Serbian folk singer; Do poslednjeg daha Tour
March 8 to March 9, 2024	Lexington Band	Serbian pop-folk band
May 17, 2024	Rod Stewart	English singer
September 21 to September 22, 2024	Tea Tairović	Serbian folk singer; Neka Gori Balkan Tour
October 11, 2024	Thirty Seconds to Mars	American rock band
November 14, 2024	André Rieu	Dutch violinist and conductor
November 23, 2024	Tanja Savić	Serbian folk singer
December 18, 2024	Laura Pausini	Italian pop singer; World Tour 2023-2024
March 8, 2025	Saša Matić	Serbian pop-folk singer
May 17, 2025	Nina Badrić	Croatian pop singer
December 6, 2025	Vlado Georgiev	Serbian pop singer
December 13, 2025	Vlado Georgiev	Serbian pop singer
February 14, 2026	Vlado Georgiev	Serbian pop singer
March 7, 2026	Vlado Georgiev	Serbian pop singer
March 21, 2026	SNS	2026 Serbian local elections rally
April 26, 2026	Eros Ramazzotti	Italian pop singer
May 7 to May 10, 2026	Ovo	Cirque du Soleil show
May 14 to May 16, 2026	Vesna Zmijanac	Serbian folk singer
May 30, 2026	Ahilej FNC 31	MMA event
July 8 to July 12, 2026	2026 FIVB Women's Volleyball Nations League pool 7	Volleyball competition
July 15 to July 19, 2026	2026 FIVB Men's Volleyball Nations League pool 7	Volleyball competition
July 30, 2026	Power Slap 22	Slap fighting event
August 1, 2026	UFC Fight Night: Medić vs. Rodriguez	MMA event

== Upcoming events ==
Musical events
Sporting events
Political rallies
Theatrical performances
Conferences and fairs
Other events

Date	Event	Notes
~~October 3, 2026~~	~~Emina Jahović~~	Serbian pop-folk singer, postponed for November 22, 2026, and venue moved to Sava Centar
October 8, 2026	ASAP Rocky	American rapper; Don't Be Dumb Tour
October 10, 2026	Deep Purple	English rock band
October 24 to October 25, 2026	Jakov Jozinović	Croatian pop singer
November 3 to November 4, 2026	Aca Lukas	Serbian turbo-folk singer
November 13, 2026	Pitbull	American rapper
November 19, 2026	André Rieu and the Johann Strauss Orchestra	Dutch violinist and conductor
December 10, 2026	Miroslav Ilić	Serbian folk singer
December 12, 2026	Boki 13	Macedonian folk singer
December 16, 2026	Smak	Serbian rock band
March 8, 2027	Peđa Jovanović	Serbian pop-folk singer

== Notes ==
1. This list does not include canceled events. Two major sporting events were scheduled to be held in the Arena prior to its eventual opening, but both of these events were canceled and subsequently relocated — the 1994 FIBA World Championship due to the Yugoslav Wars and the international sanctions imposed to the Federal Republic of Yugoslavia, and the 1999 World Table Tennis Championships due to the NATO bombing of Yugoslavia.
