= 2010–11 Euroleague Top 16 Group G =

Standings and Results for Group G of the Top 16 phase of the 2010–11 Euroleague basketball tournament.

== Standings ==
Key to colors
| Top two places in each group advance to Quarterfinals |

| | Team | Pld | W | L | PF | PA | Diff | Tie-break |
|---|---|---|---|---|---|---|---|---|
| 1. | (Spain) Real Madrid | 6 | 5 | 1 | 460 | 423 | +37 | |
| 2. | (Italy) Montepaschi Siena | 6 | 4 | 2 | 452 | 423 | +29 | |
| 3. | (Turkey) Efes Pilsen | 6 | 2 | 4 | 426 | 455 | −29 | |
| 4. | (Serbia) Partizan | 6 | 1 | 5 | 389 | 426 | −37 | |

== Fixtures and results ==
All times given below are in Central European Time.

Unless otherwise indicated, all attendance totals are from the corresponding match report posted on the official Euroleague site and included with each game summary.

=== Game 1 ===
19 January 2011
19:15

Report

| Efes Pilsen (Turkey) | 60–58 | (Italy) Montepaschi Siena |
Scoring by quarter: 18–17, 11–10, 18–13, 13–18
| Pts: Rakočević 17; Rebs: Thornton 9 Asts: Gönlüm 5 | | Pts: Raković 16; Rebs: Raković 8 Asts: Zisis 5 |

Sinan Erdem Dome, Istanbul
Attendance: 11,800
Referees: Christos Christodoulou (GRE), Dani Hierrezuelo (ESP), Damir Javor (SLO)

19 January 2011
20:45

Report

| Real Madrid (Spain) | 78–58 | (Serbia) Partizan |
Scoring by quarter: 17–18, 26–9, 15–13, 20–18
| Pts: Llull 21; Rebs: Veličković 12; Asts: Llull 4 | | Pts: Jerrells, Jawai 12; Rebs: Gist 9 Asts: Jerrells 4 |

Caja Mágica, Madrid
Attendance: 5,097
Referees: Volodymr Drabikovsky (UKR), Robert Lottermoser (GER), Elias Koromilas (GRE)

=== Game 2 ===
26 January 2011
20:45

Report

| Partizan (Serbia) | 76–79 | (Turkey) Efes Pilsen |
Scoring by quarter: 21–19, 13–21, 18–19, 24–20
| Pts: Gist 19; Rebs: Three players 6 Asts: Jerrells 7 | | Pts: Rakočević 23; Rebs: Roberts 5 Asts: Three players 3 |

Belgrade Arena, Belgrade
Attendance: 17,893
Referees: Juan Carlos Arteaga (ESP), Marek Cmikiewicz (POL), Carmelo Paternico (ITA)

26 January 2011
20:45

Report

| Montepaschi Siena (Italy) | 68–78 | (Spain) Real Madrid |
Scoring by quarter: 20–13, 20–15, 22–24, 6–26
| Pts: Moss 16; Rebs: Lavrinovic, Stonerook 5 Asts: Kaukėnas 4 | | Pts: Mirotić 16; Rebs: Reyes 11; Asts: Prigioni 6 |

Palasport Mens Sana, Siena
Attendance: 4,991
Referees: Carl Jungebrand (FIN), Matej Boltauzer (SLO), Eddie Viator (FRA)

=== Game 3 ===
3 February 2011
20:45

Report

| Real Madrid (Spain) | 89–86 (OT) | (Turkey) Efes Pilsen |
Scoring by quarter: 18–19, 22–27, 25–19, 14–14, Overtime: 10–7
| Pts: Tucker 19; Rebs: Fischer 12; Asts: Rodríguez 7 | | Pts: Thornton 18; Rebs: Gönlüm 9 Asts: Tunçeri 5 |

Caja Mágica, Madrid
Attendance: 6,032
Referees: Saša Pukl (SLO), Grezegorz Ziemlicki (POL), Milivoje Jovičić (SRB)

3 February 2011
20:45

Report

| Partizan (Serbia) | 58–66 | (Italy) Montepaschi Siena |
Scoring by quarter: 15–19, 11–12, 15–19, 17–16
| Pts: Gist 15; Rebs: Gist 7 Asts: Jerrells 3 | | Pts: Michelori 15; Rebs: Raković, Stonerook 7 Asts: Zisis, Stonerook 3 |

Belgrade Arena, Belgrade
Attendance: 17,923
Referees: Jose Martín (ESP), Borys Ryzhyk (UKR), Juan Carlos García González (ESP)

=== Game 4 ===
16 February 2011
20:45

Report

| Montepaschi Siena (Italy) | 77–74 | (Serbia) Partizan |
Scoring by quarter: 12–20, 26–17, 15–16, 24–21
| Pts: Kaukėnas 17; Rebs: Zisis 6 Asts: Moss 4 | | Pts: Veselý 17; Rebs: Katić 12; Asts: Jerrells 5 |

Palasport Mens Sana, Siena
Attendance: 4,822
Referees: Jose Ramón García Ortiz (ESP), David Chambon (FRA), Tomas Jasevičius (LTU)

17 February 2011
19:15

Report

| Efes Pilsen (Turkey) | 60–77 | (Spain) Real Madrid |
Scoring by quarter: 12–13, 12–22, 13–21, 23–21
| Pts: Thornton 10; Rebs: Roberts 7 Asts: Roberts, Murray 2 | | Pts: Llull 17; Rebs: Fischer 7 Asts: Llull 5 |

Sinan Erdem Dome, Istanbul
Attendance: 14,250
Referees: Zoran Sutulović (MNE), Paolo Taurino (ITA), Sinisa Herceg (CRO)

=== Game 5 ===
24 February 2011
20:45

Report

| Montepaschi Siena (Italy) | 88–76 | (Turkey) Efes Pilsen |
Scoring by quarter: 25–23, 24–24, 21–11, 18–18
| Pts: Raković 15; Rebs: Hairston, Lavrinovič 5 Asts: Zisis 5 | | Pts: Rakočević 24; Rebs: Thornton 6 Asts: Wisniewski 3 |

Palasport Mens Sana, Siena
Attendance: 5,039
Referees: Christos Christodoulou (GRE), Robert Lottermoser (GER), Milija Vojinović (MNE)

24 February 2011
20:45

Report

| Partizan (Serbia) | 56–61 | (Spain) Real Madrid |
Scoring by quarter: 12–15, 6–18, 18–11, 20–17
| Pts: Veselý 15; Rebs: Katić, Gist 8 Asts: Gist 2 | | Pts: Tomić 21; Rebs: Mirotić 9 Asts: Prigioni 6 |

Belgrade Arena, Belgrade
Attendance: 16,525
Referees: Fabio Facchini (ITA), Recep Ankaralı (TUR), Luís Lopes (POR)

=== Game 6 ===
3 March 2011
19:45

Report

| Efes Pilsen (Turkey) | 65–67 | (Serbia) Partizan |
Scoring by quarter: 12–21, 22–16, 13–12, 18–18
| Pts: Rakočević 19; Rebs: Thornton, Gönlüm 8 Asts: Tunçeri, Gönlüm 3 | | Pts: Veselý 23; Rebs: Katić 8 Asts: Jerrells 7 |

Sinan Erdem Dome, Istanbul
Attendance: 3,750
Referees: Dani Hierruzuelo (ESP), Nicola Maestre (FRA), Spiros Gkontas (GRE)

3 March 2011
19:45

Report

| Real Madrid (Spain) | 77–95 | (Italy) Montepaschi Siena |
Scoring by quarter: 19–26, 13–29, 19–23, 26–17
| Pts: Mirotić 13; Rebs: Reyes 6 Asts: Rodríguez, Llull 5 | | Pts: Hairston 17; Rebs: Raković 5 Asts: Zisis 4 |

Caja Mágica, Madrid
Attendance: 4,821
Referees: Volodymr Drabikovsky (UKR), Sradan Dozai (CRO), Matej Boltzauer (SLO)
