= Foam party =

Party with suds for ambiance

Foam party in Belek, Turkey, in 2022

A foam party is a social event at which participants dance to music on a dance floor covered in several feet of suds or bubbles, dispensed from a foam machine. In the past, foam parties have been associated with nightclubs, large events, and college parties.

Today, mobile foam party services and foam machine rental companies are available to bring foam party equipment to residential properties and backyards for birthday parties, graduation parties, and family reunions. Mobile foam parties are also a popular form of enrichment and physical activity for children at schools, daycare centers, and summer camps.

== History ==
Foam parties can be dated back to A Rhapsody in Black and Blue, a 1932 short film directed by Aubrey Scotto, wherein Louis Armstrong dances, sings, and plays his trumpet in a large area of soap suds. Songs performed in the foam are "I'll Be Glad When You're Dead, You Rascal You" and "Shine". Another film featuring foam parties is The Party, featuring Peter Sellers.

Modern foam parties were developed in the early 1990s by club promoters in Ibiza. Generally, machines were large, ceiling-mounted foam generators, created by Weird Dream Productions, that created a large volume of foam that fell from the ceiling onto clubbers. The large water usage and subsequent cleanup required made this impractical for many venues, resulting in a demand upon Weird Dream Productions to modify their foam to be of low water content. Weird Dreams achieved this in model Mk III, which produced 200,000 litres per minute with just 50l of water. UK style leaders Big Fun and Roy Barlow Leisure purchased machines from Weird Dream Productions and later manufactured their own versions, creating a global market for the product, and these three companies remained global market leaders throughout the craze. All market leaders were UK-based until around 2004. In recent years, there has been a large growth in at-home parties, and even more grand foam experiences. In the kids birthday and party market, many companies offer parties for front or back yards, using the water and electricity of the homeowner. Sometimes one can rent inflatables to contain the foam. While they can contain the foam, these can take up a lot of space. In warmer climates, kids often wear bathing suits. Today, a few companies make foam cannons from industrial fans and pipes.

As Ibiza foam parties became more popular, the craze spread, and the foam cannon was developed by Roy Barlow from The Entertainment Biz and Robin Wincup from Galaxy.

In the 1990s, foam parties were performed weekly at Amnesia in Ibiza.

== Safety ==
Numerous hazards are associated with foam parties. Common hazards include slipping on floors made slick by the foam, with risks being intensified when combined with alcohol.

In 2008, three people were electrocuted and two others injured at a foam party at the Venezia Palace Hotel in Antalya, Turkey.
