= Snežana Đurišić =

Serbian folk singer (born 1959)

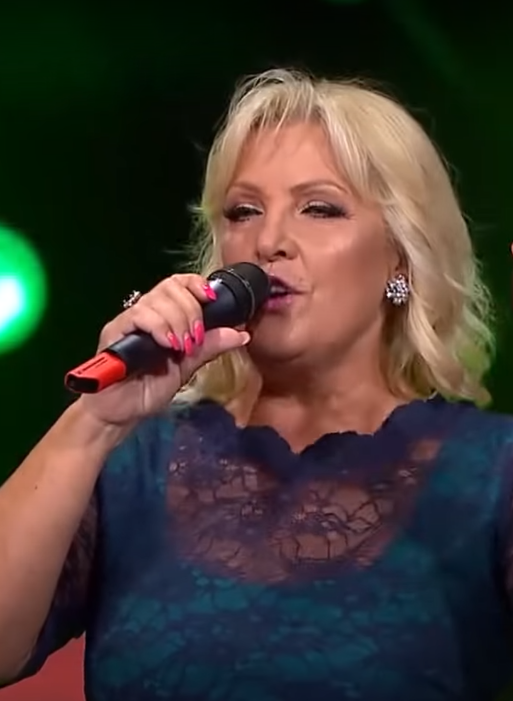
- Đurišić in 2018

Background information
- Also known as: Queen of folk music
- Born: 6 June 1959 (age 67); Gornji Milanovac, PR Serbia, FPR Yugoslavia
- Genres: Folk
- Occupation: Singer
- Instrument: Vocals
- Years active: 1969–present
- Labels: PGP-RTB; PGP-RTS; ZaM; Grand Production
- Spouse: Slobodan Gvozdenović (m. 1977; died 2013)

Snežana Đurišić (Serbian Cyrillic: Снежана Ђуришић; born 6 June 1959) is a Serbian folk singer. Her career spans more than half a century (in April 2019 she marked 50 years anniversary by concert in Sava Centar). She was dubbed "Queen of folk music" in both her home and neighbouring countries, and is considered one of the best interpreters of her genre.

== Biography ==
Her first release was in 1969, when she was nine; since then, she has recorded more than 40 sound carriers (EPs, LPs, CDs). She received a dozen of respected awards for her contribution to music arts. She is a jury member of Serbian noted music competition show, Zvezde Granda.

Her greatest hits include "Lepi moj", "Pričaj mi, pričaj", "Imena mi mog", "Kuće male", "Kleo se, kleo", "Odakle si, sele", "Učiniću sve", "Srna", "Isplači se", "Sve je prošlo među nama", "Mala soba tri sa tri", "Vratiću se", "Kiše", "Između mene i tebe, tama", "Ti, ona i ja", "Naše tajne čuva vodenica", "Noć se sprema", "Niko me nije voleo kao ti", etc.

In February 2026, she was awarded the gold medal for Merit of Serbia.

She used to be married to Slobodan Gvozdenović from 1977 to 2013.

== Discography ==
Studio albums

- 1979: Moj dilbere, kud se šećeš (Jugoton)
- 1979: Snežana Gvozdenović Đurišić (Polyband)
- 1980: Ne daj me nikom više (Diskos)
- 1982: Nema ćara od bećara (PGP RTB)
- 1983: Mala soba tri sa tri (PGP RTB)
- 1984: Sve što radim tebi prija/Pomozi mi (PGP RTB)
- 1985: Kako je lepo bilo/Pričaj mi, pričaj (PGP RTB)
- 1986: Kad bi još jednom pokušali (PGP RTB)
- 1986: Iznenadi me/Lako si me preboleo (PGP RTB)
- 1988: Biće dana (PGP RTB)
- 1989: Odakle si, sele (PGP RTB)
- 1990: Učiniću sve (PGP RTB)
- 1992: Ljubav je raj (PGP RTB)
- 1994: Neće srce (M.i T. Starčević & Pelex)
- 1996: Istina (PGP RTS)
- 1996: Ona ti srce slomila (M. i T. Starčević)
- 1997: Kraljica (ZaM & Discolux)
- 1997: Zoro, sestro (ZaM & Vujin Trade Line AG)
- 1998: Devet dana (ZaM)
- 2000: Da mi je (ZaM)
- 2001: Jača od života (ZaM)
- 2004: Za tebe slobodna (Grand Production)
- 2009: Velika kuća, veliki grad (Grand Production)

Singles

- 2008: "Dunja"
- 2009: "Da zaigram, da zapevam"
- 2011: "Đurđevdan"
- 2012: "Kandilo"
- 2012: "Volim te, iako ne smem"
- 2012: "Očev zavet"
- 2013: "Kako da se pomirim sa tim"
- 2015: "Kad bi bilo kako nam je bilo"
- 2016: "Robinja"
- 2017: "Nisi me čekao"
- 2017: "Posle tebe, ti"
- 2019: "Kaluđeru moj" (ft Dejan Petrović & Big band)
