= Inje (band) =

inje
- Origin: Belgrade, Serbia
- Genres: Electropop
- Years active: 2007–2015
- Label: UZROK
- Members: Jelena Miletić; Jovan Vesić
- Past members: Marko Ignjatović; Aleksandra Vučelić
- Website: inje.bandcamp.com

Inje (stylized in lowercase as inje; Serbian Cyrillic: иње; trans. Hoar frost) was a Serbian electropop band from Belgrade, formed in 2007 and performing until 2015. Serbian daily newspaper Politika described inje as "minimal, dream-like, electro-pop with ethereal female vocals".

== History and releases ==
Their first self-released single "Skrivenosemenica" (2008) entered independent local charts, got remixed by Serbian music producer Felony Flats and was featured on "DS:Vol.1", a compilation of "industrial/gothic/dark-wave" music from Balkans. Subsequently, the band was announced the second best debut act of the year 2008 by the webzine Popboks critics.

After few more internet-only releases, their first official CD (maxi single "Lego"), was released in 2009 on Serbian independent record label UZROK. Same year, inje covered "Jugoslovenka", a song by famous Serbian folk singer Lepa Brena for purposes of the compilation "Dark Tribute to Lepa Brena". In a review on music portal Terapija their cover was described as one of the most memorable from the compilation, "rough, dancefloor-oriented disco-electro EBM with sweet female vocals and processed guitar solos".

Their maxi-single "Danas" (Uzrok, 2010, featuring a B-side and five remixes) gathers attention of a wider audience and enters top 10 lists of relevant Serbian TV and radio stations such as, RTV Studio B, and Jelen Top 10, also reaching positions on the official yearly music charts on B92 (16) and Popboks (14) for 2010. The remix of the song by the band Izae also appeared on the compilation KOMPOT curated by Croatian magazine Pot-lista.

In 2011 inje released their first and only album "Protok" which was described by critics as "good for dance-floor and chill-out at the same time", and "reserved, repetitive but very melodic and emotional. Weekly newspaper Novi Magazin saw it as "modern combination of electro-pop, rock and industrial with very suggestive, almost innocent vocals" and Indieoteque as "extremely high quality electro-pop", while UrbanLook compared sound of Protok with GusGus and Ladytron. In the song "Kanalizacija" inje paid homage to their long-term collaborator band Lollobrigida and referenced lyrics from their song "Party" originally released in 2004.

In April 2012, a single "Kofein i CO2" was released via their Bandcamp page with an accompanying video. In 2013 inje collaborated with Croatian synth-pop/new wave band Hemendex on their album "Solution to Reality" with backing vocals, co-production and mixing. The same year, Croatian online magazine Kult included them in their choice of "best indie bands in the region." In 2015 Creative Commons issued "Affiliates Mixtape #1" with 25 songs, including inje's "Kofein i CO2", under CC license and free download.

In June 2015, inje released a video for the song "Java i San" from the album "Protok". During the same year, inje promoted songs from a new album which has been unreleased. Despite their popularity, since spring 2015 they have not been active as a band.

From around the same time, both Vesić and Miletić, in collaboration with Bojan Brankov, have been developing an independent "non-linear point&click adventure game set in a post-apocalyptic steampunk world" as part of Moonburnt Studio, which was hailed as the "Best Indie Game" by Reboot InfoGamer in 2015. According to their Kickstarter project updates, the game is still in production process. Vesić continues to play music in DJ sets.

== Remixing ==
In the contest held by MTV for the best remix of a song by Lollobrigida ("Volim te") in 2009, inje was one of the five winners. They also did remixes for Jenny Wilson, Nipplepeople, Svi Na Pod! and Luke Black.

Their songs were remixed by Felony Flats, Maiv, Izae, Yan Prawda, Trash Ur Disco, Lucky7, Radoslav Zdravković, Telekraft, Stung, Breezesquad, and Jelly For The Babies.

== Live performances ==
Among the most important live performances of the band were two in Belgrade Arena as warm-up acts for Faithless and Hurts. They also performed on EXIT festival (Exit Music Live stage 2009 and Elektrana stage 2010, 2011), Mikser Festival 2010, and many cities in Balkans including Belgrade, Novi Sad, Zagreb, Subotica, Banja Luka, Tuzla, Šabac, Zaječar, Pančevo among others. They have also been performing as a DJ set.

== Discography ==
=== Albums ===
- protok (2011, Uzrok)

=== EPs ===
- inje (2008, self-released)

=== Singles ===
- lego (2009, Uzrok)
- danas (2010, Uzrok)
- kofein i co2 (2012, Uzrok)

=== Other ===
- live@exit09 (2009, self-released)

=== Compilations ===
- DS:Vol.1 (2008, "Skrivenosemenica", Bleak Netlabel)
- Dark Tribute to Lepa Brena (2009, "Jugoslovenka", Dark Scene Records)
- Maska Sessions (2011, "Lego", Ammonite Records)
- Kompot (2011, "Danas (Izae Remix)", Pot Lista)
- CC Affiliates Mixtape #1 (2015, "Kofein i CO2", Creative Commons Affiliates)

=== Remixes ===
- Lollobrigida – Volim te (2009, self-released)
- Nipplepeople – Sutra (2010, self-released)
- Svi Na Pod! – Zlatne Spirale (2013, MTV.RS)
- Luke Black – Holding On To Love (2015, Universal Music GmbH)

Production

- Hemendex – Solution To Reality (2013, self-released)
