= Sarajevo cable car =

Cable car in Sarajevo, Bosnia and Herzegovina

- Sarajevska žičara
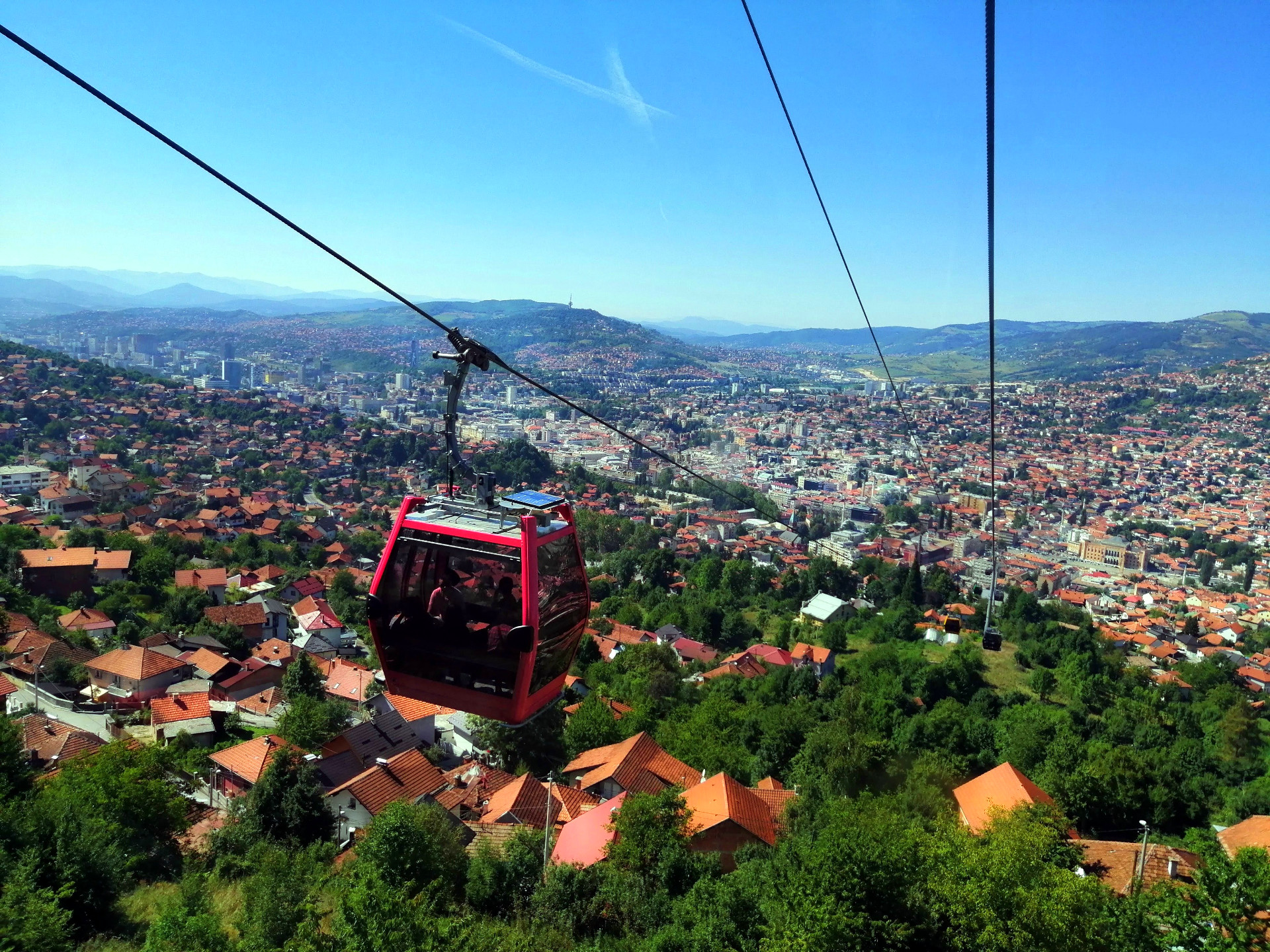
- View of Sarajevo from the cable car

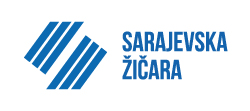
- Logo of the Sarajevo cable car
- Interactive map of Sarajevo cable car

Overview
- Status: Operational
- Character: Elevated
- Location: Sarajevo - Trebević
- Country: Bosnia and Herzegovina
- Coordinates: 43°51′19.48″N 18°26′5.45″E
- Termini: Bistrik, Stari Grad, Sarajevo (start); Station "Ramo Biber" on Trebević (end)
- Elevation: lowest: 583 m (1,913 ft) highest: 1,160 m (3,810 ft)
- No. of stations: 2
- Built by: Džekos d.o.o. and Stim d.o.o.
- Construction cost: ~11 million € (reopening)
- Open: 3 May 1959; 67 years ago
- Closed: 18 November 1989; 36 years ago (completely destroyed in 1992–1995)
- Reopened: 6 April 2018; 8 years ago
- Website: zicara.ba

Operation
- Owner: City of Sarajevo
- Operator: J.P. Sarajevo d.o.o.
- No. of carriers: 33
- Carrier capacity: 10
- Operating times: (summer) Monday to Friday from 10:00 to 21:00, Saturday and Sunday from 9:00 to 21:00 (winter) Monday to Sunday from 09:00 to 17:00
- Trip duration: 7 min
- Fare: 6 KM (both ways for citizens of Bosnia and Herzegovina); 30 KM (both ways for foreigners)

Technical features
- Aerial lift type: Gondola lift
- Manufactured by: Leitner Ropeways (motor, cable, cable cars, towers)
- Line length: 2,200 m (7,200 ft)
- No. of support towers: 10
- Operating speed: 5 m/s (16 ft/s)

The Sarajevo cable car (Bosnian: Sarajevska žičara), also known as the Trebević cable car (Bosnian: Trebevićka žičara), is a gondola lift in Sarajevo, Bosnia and Herzegovina, connecting the old part of the city with the mountain Trebević.

== History ==
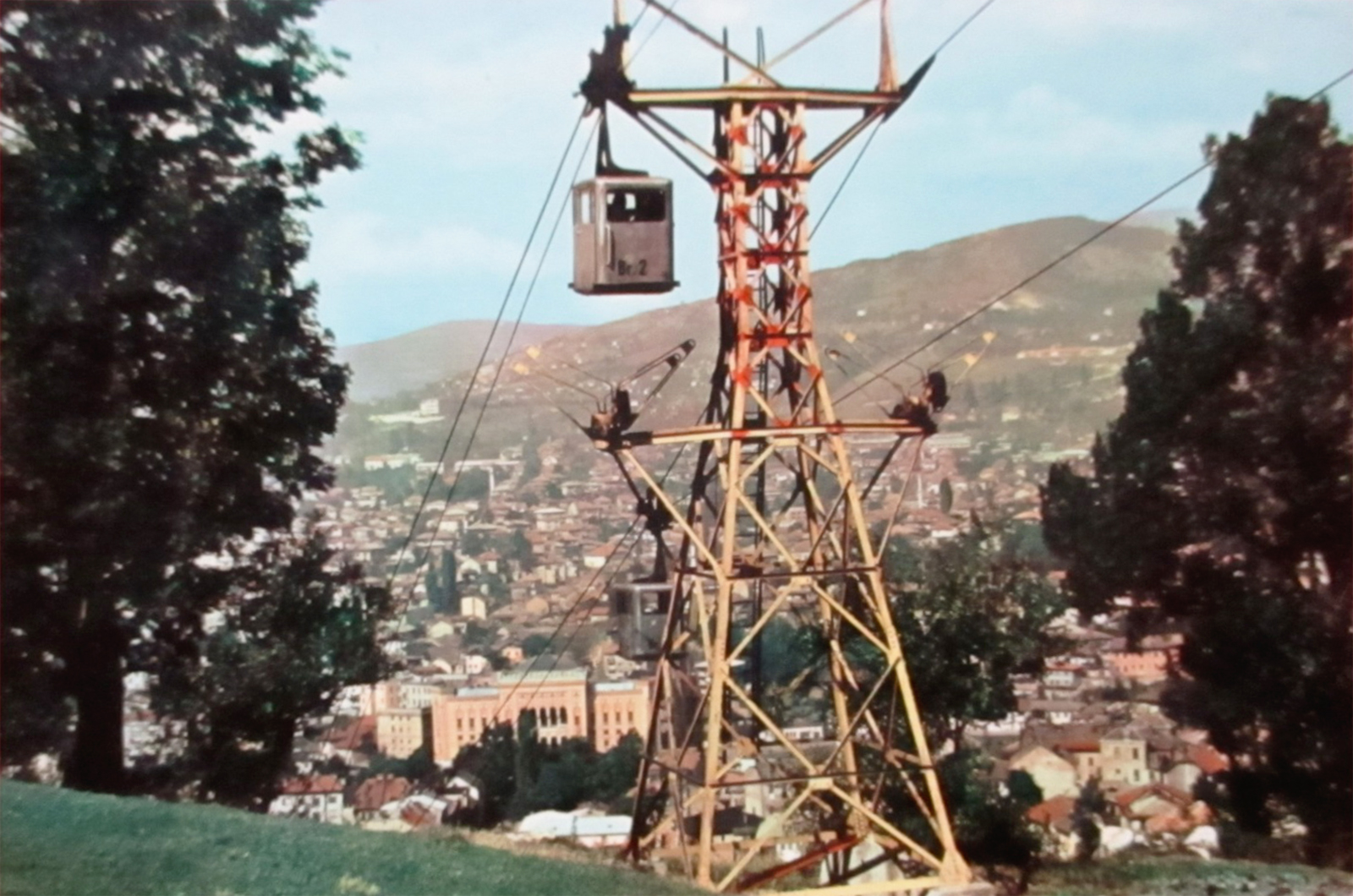
Trebević cable car in 1960

The Trebević cable car was first built in 1959, and opened for the public on 3 May 1959. It had a capacity of 400 passengers per hour. However, the many years of operation and repairs took a toll on the cable car which resulted in serious problems, so much so that the relevant institutions forbade further repairs of the cable car. Such issues arose in 1977, 1982, 1986, 1987, and in particular on 18 November 1989, when further repairs of the cable car was banned by the Institute "ZRMK" from Ljubljana.

During the Bosnian War (1992–1995), the cable car was completely destroyed.

== Reopening in 2018 ==
After closing in 1989, the Trebević cable car was reconstructed between 2017 and 2018, and officially reopened on 6 April 2018. A total of 33 modern cable cars make up the new system, which can transport up to 1,200 passengers from the city to Trebević per hour, with a ride duration of nine minutes each way.

Mufid Garibija, the designer of the Trebević cable railway station and the starting station, said that the entire lane would be panoramic, and the stations and gondolas would dominate the glass, which would contribute to the enjoyment of visitors in view of Sarajevo. "Gondolas will be in the colors of the Olympic circles and will reflect the unity and multi-ethnicity of Sarajevo," said Garibija.

The cable car has 33 gondolas, of which five are in the colors of the Olympic circles: blue, red, yellow, green and black, one in the colour of the flag of BiH, while the other ones are black.

To announce the cable car's reopening, a promotional song named "Trebević opet silazi u grad" (eng: Trebević is coming to the city again) was officially presented on 23 March 2018. The song was performed by singers Hari Varešanović, Ismeta Dervoz, Zdravko Čolić, and Jasna Gospić, all born in Sarajevo and former members of the band Ambasadori.

== See also ==
- Sarajevo Olympic Bobsleigh and Luge Track
