= Jakov Jozinović =

Croatian pop singer

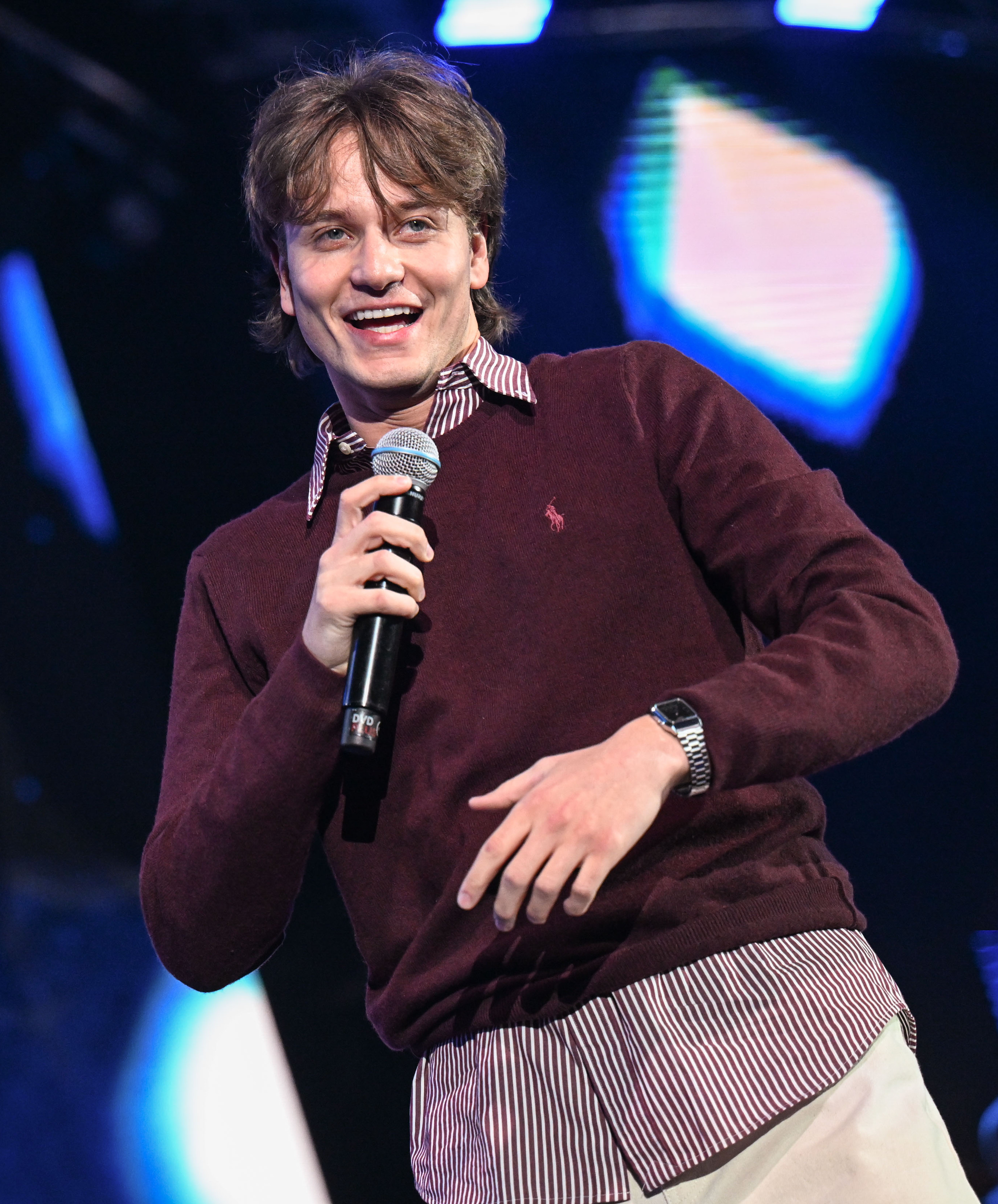
- Jakov in 2026 at Golden Ladybug of Popularity

Background information
- Born: 27 September 2005 (age 21); Vinkovci, Croatia
- Genre: Pop
- Occupation: Singer
- Years active: 2018–present
- Label: K.S.V.
- Award: Porin Award
- Website: jakovjozinovic.hr

Jakov Jozinović (born 27 September 2005) is a Croatian pop singer. He gained public recognition through television talent shows and later through social media, where his vocal covers attracted significant attention. In 2026, he released his debut album Ja za čuda letim, which was preceded by two commercially successful singles "Polje ruža" (2025) and "Ja volim" (2026). He has given concerts across the post-Yugoslav region.

== Early life ==
Jakov Jozinović was born on 27 September 2005 in Vinkovci, Croatia. He developed an interest in music at a young age and began posting song covers online during his teenage years. He is currently a student of political sciences at the University of Zagreb. His talent was noticed by actor Enis Bešlagić who was present at an audition when Jakov was only 12 years old.

== Career ==
=== 2018–2025: Rise to fame and covers ===
Jozinović began sharing music covers on his YouTube channel in 2018. His first major public appearance came in 2021, when he competed in the eighth season of the Croatian television talent show Supertalent, where he performed Queen's song "Bohemian Rhapsody" (1975).

In 2025, his cover of Đorđe Balašević's song "Olivera" (1985) gained widespread attention on social media platforms, contributing to a rapid increase in his popularity. He has also performed covers of songs such as "Kuća puna naroda" (2017), "Da je tuga snijeg" (2000), "One Night Only" (1981), "Moja Juliška" (1992), and "End of Beginning" (2022). He also performed a cover version of the latter song on 10 February 2025 together with Croatian singer Matija Cvek as part of a series of covers he recorded in the kitchen. Their version of the song went viral. He has also covered songs by Oliver Dragojević, Zlatan Stipišić Gibonni, Zdravko Čolić, Toše Proeski, and Matija Cvek among others.

Following his growing popularity, Jozinović began performing live concerts in several cities throughout the region, including performances in Croatia, Slovenia, Serbia, Bosnia and Herzegovina, Montenegro and North Macedonia. He won a Porin Award in 2026 in the category for Best New Performer. His extremely high popularity and "hysteric" reaction among the female fans in the region has been compared to Beatlemania. Jakov has shared how his biggest musical inspiration comes from Dragojević and the emotions he shared in his songs.

=== 2025–present: Ja za čuda letim and tour ===
On 21 November 2025, he released his first single, titled "Polje ruža" whose music and lyrics were written by Matija Cvek, while the arrangement and production was finalized by Filip Vincek and Marko Palameta. An accompanying music video was filmed in Zagreb under the direction of Danko Šimunović and Pave Elez. On 8 December 2025, the song reached the peak of the HR Top 100 chart in Croatia in its second week of the chart, moving from its debut of number 4. On 3 February 2026, Jakov released his second single, "Ja volim", with lyrics written by himself, Laura Sučec and Matt Shaft while the music was written by the latter two. Marko Palameta was responsible for the production and arrangement of the song. The music video for the song was directed by Šimunović and Elez and premiered on the same day. The song was a big commercial success, reaching the top of the charts in Croatia.

Starting with a concert on 14 February 2026, he had his first regional tour Ja za čuda letim with a first concert in Split which then continued in ex-Yugoslav countries. In February 2026, he received his first Golden Studio Award. During an interview at the show he announced that his first studio album would be titled Ja za čuda letim and would be released before his first concert at the Arena Zagreb.

== Personal life ==
Jozinović was born and raised in Vinkovci, Croatia. During his Supertalent performance of "Bohemian Rhapsody", he dedicated the song to his mother. His mother is a relative of Croatian singer Minea who is his godmother. His uncle is former football player and coach Darko Jozinović. He has played tennis as a hobby.

== Discography ==
=== Studio albums ===
List of studio albums, showing release date, label and chart positions
Title	Details	Peak chart positions	
Title	Details	CRO Dom.	AUT
Ja za čuda letim	Released: 14 June 2026; Label: K.S.V.; Format: Digital download, streaming	—	34

=== Singles ===
List of singles as lead artist, showing year released, chart positions and album name
Title	Year	Top position		Album
Title	Year	CRO	CRO Billb.	Album
"Ispred bijele hostije" (with Dominik Lučić)	2025	—	—	Non-album single
"Polje ruža"	2025	1	1	Ja za čuda letim
"Ja volim"	2026	1	1	Ja za čuda letim
"Ljudi poput nas" (with Jasna Zlokić)	2026	1	—	Non-album single

=== Other charted songs ===
List of other charted songs, with selected chart positions, showing year released and album name
Title	Year	Top position		Album
Title	Year	CRO	CRO Billb.	Album
"Na mjestu mom"	2026	54	8	Ja za čuda letim
"4 laste"	2026	—	7	Ja za čuda letim
"Meri"	2026	4	5	Ja za čuda letim
"Voljela bi to"	2026	89	10	Ja za čuda letim
"Raj"	2026	36	1	Ja za čuda letim
"Nećeš spavati"	2026	10	3	Ja za čuda letim
"Stol za dvoje"	2026	—	17	Ja za čuda letim
"Ja za čuda letim"	2026	30	11	Ja za čuda letim
"—" denotes a recording that did not chart.
