= Red Star Stadium =

Football stadium in Belgrade, Serbia

Rajko Mitić Stadium
- Marakana
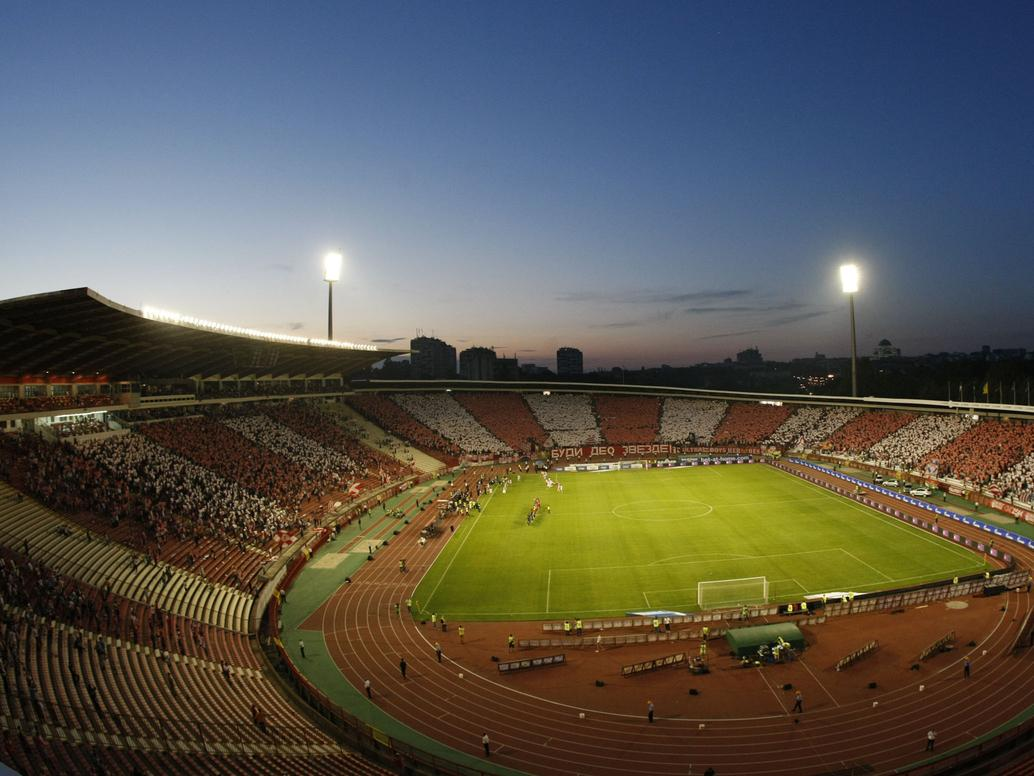
- UEFA
- Interactive map of Rajko Mitić Stadium
- Full name: Rajko Mitić Stadium
- Former names: Red Star Stadium (1963–2014)
- Location: Dedinje, Belgrade, Serbia
- Coordinates: 44°47′00″N 20°27′53″E
- Owner: Red Star Belgrade
- Operator: Red Star Belgrade
- Capacity: 49,167
- Executive suites: 5 (450 seats)
- Surface: Hybrid grass
- Scoreboard: LED
- Record attendance: 116,000 Red Star Belgrade vs Ferencváros (23 April 1975)
- Field size: 110 x 73 meters

Construction
- Built: 1960–1963
- Opened: 1 September 1963; 63 years ago
- Renovated: 2017–present

Tenants
- Red Star Belgrade (1963–present); Serbia national football team (2006–present): Major sporting events hosted; 1973 European Cup Final; 1976 EBU Light heavyweight title fight; UEFA Euro 1976; 1979 UEFA Cup Final; 2009 Universiade Athletics

The Rajko Mitić Stadium (Serbian: Стадион Рајко Митић, romanized: Stadion Rajko Mitić, pronounced [ˈstâdioːn ˈrâːjko ˈmǐːtit͡ɕ]), previously known as Red Star Stadium (Стадион Црвенe звездe, Stadion Crvene zvezde) and also known as Marakana (Serbian Cyrillic: Маракана), is a multi-use stadium in Belgrade, Serbia, which has been the home ground of the Red Star Belgrade since 1963. The stadium is located in Dedinje, municipality of Savski Venac.

Rajko Mitić Stadium, renamed in December 2014 in honor of the club's former player and legend Rajko Mitić (1922–2008), has a seating capacity of 49,167 and is currently the largest stadium in Serbia by capacity.

The stadium has hosted numerous international matches at a senior level, including the European Cup final in 1973 and the UEFA European Championship finals in 1976.

== History ==
The first football stadium in this location was opened on 24 April 1927. It was the stadium of SK Jugoslavija, Yugoslav football champion in 1924 and 1925. It consisted of a 30,000 capacity stadium with grass pitch, athletic track, training facility, and club house. SK Jugoslavija played its matches on the stadium until the end of the Second World War, when the club was disbanded by the new Yugoslav authorities. The ground was signed over to the newly founded club Red Star Belgrade.

=== Old ground Avala ===
The stadium was named "Avala". In 1945 it was seen as the stadium for the "Metalac" football club (former BSK, today OFK Beograd), but Vladimir Dedijer, president of the Yugoslav Gym Association at the time, granted it to the newly formed Red Star. In the summer of 1958, Red Star was to play against CDNA from Bulgaria (today CSKA Sofia). The municipal inspector from Stari Grad inspected the venue and declared it unusable, for the wooden beams were completely rotten. Until the new stadium was built, Red Star mostly played as the host at the JNA Stadium (today Partizan Stadium) while using some smaller venues for less important matches.

On 27 December 1959, Red Star played its last match at the old ground. FK Novi Sad was the opposition in a farewell game at the dilapidated arena.

Together with the crumbling facility, a part of football history had left as well. At that stadium Moša Marjanović put a famous goal past the Spanish keeper Ricardo Zamora, also František Plánička was defeated, and after the Second World War plenty of exciting games were played. These included the European Cup quarter-final second leg on 5 February 1958, in which Red Star took on the English league champions Manchester United, who had won the first leg in England 2–1. Despite fighting back to draw 3-3 after being 3-0 down, Red Star were eliminated from the competition by the English side. The game is most memorable for being the last played by the Manchester United side before the Munich air disaster the following day, when the team's aeroplane crashed in the West German city of Munich on the return journey. Eight Manchester United players were among the 23 people who died as a result of their injuries in the crash, while two of the surviving players were injured to such an extent that they never played again.

After the farewell game, the stadium was demolished to be replaced by a modern new sporting facility on exactly the same spot. In order to prepare an adequate foundation for the construction of the new stadium, it was to be started 12 meters lower than the previous one. Over 350,000 cubic metres of soil and 15,000 cubic metres of stone had to be excavated.

=== Marakana ===
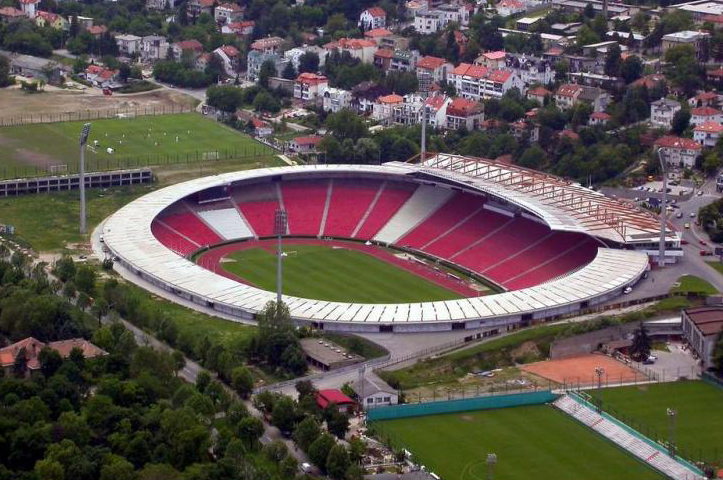
From a bird's eye view

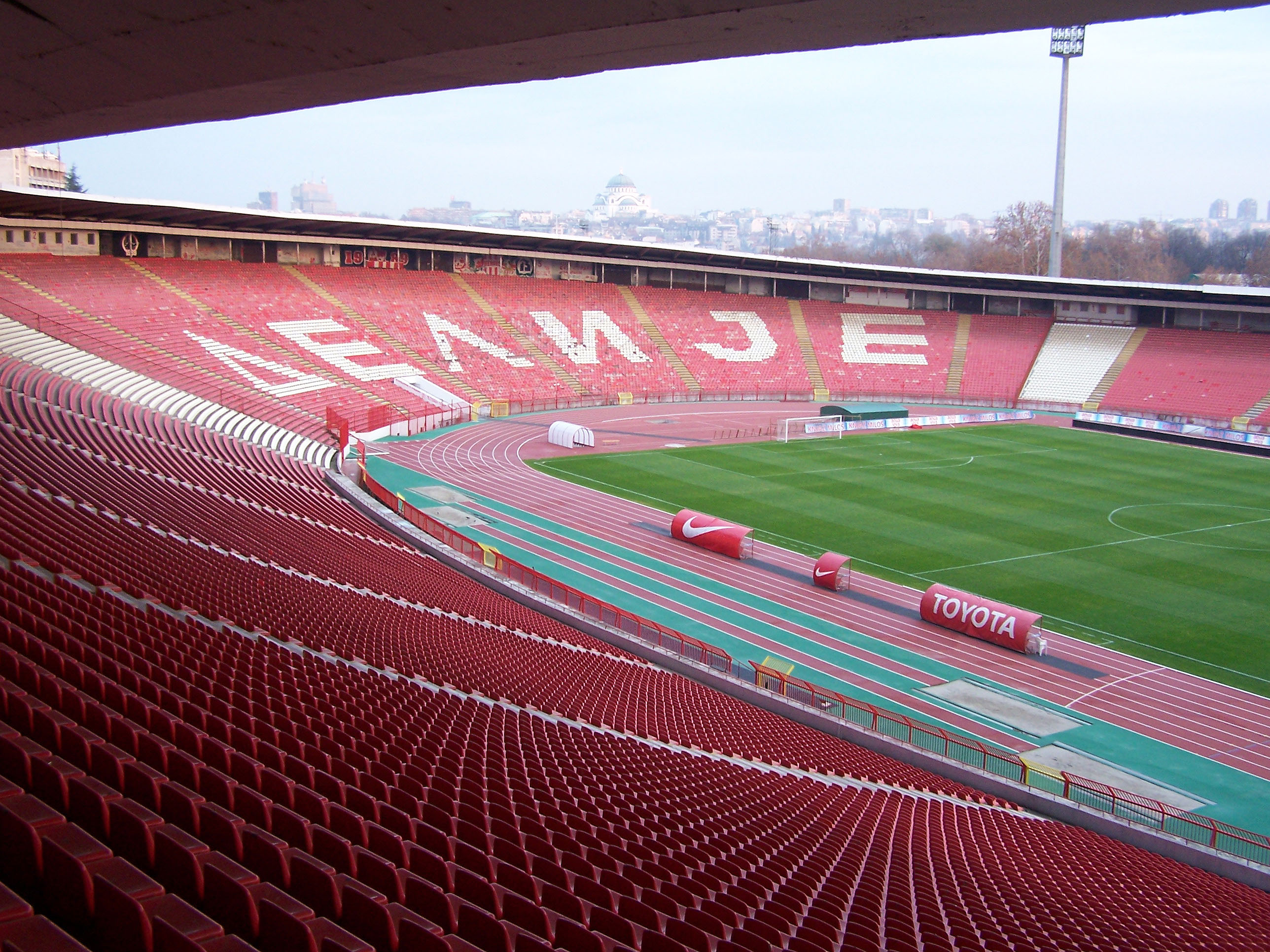
View from roof above the south stand

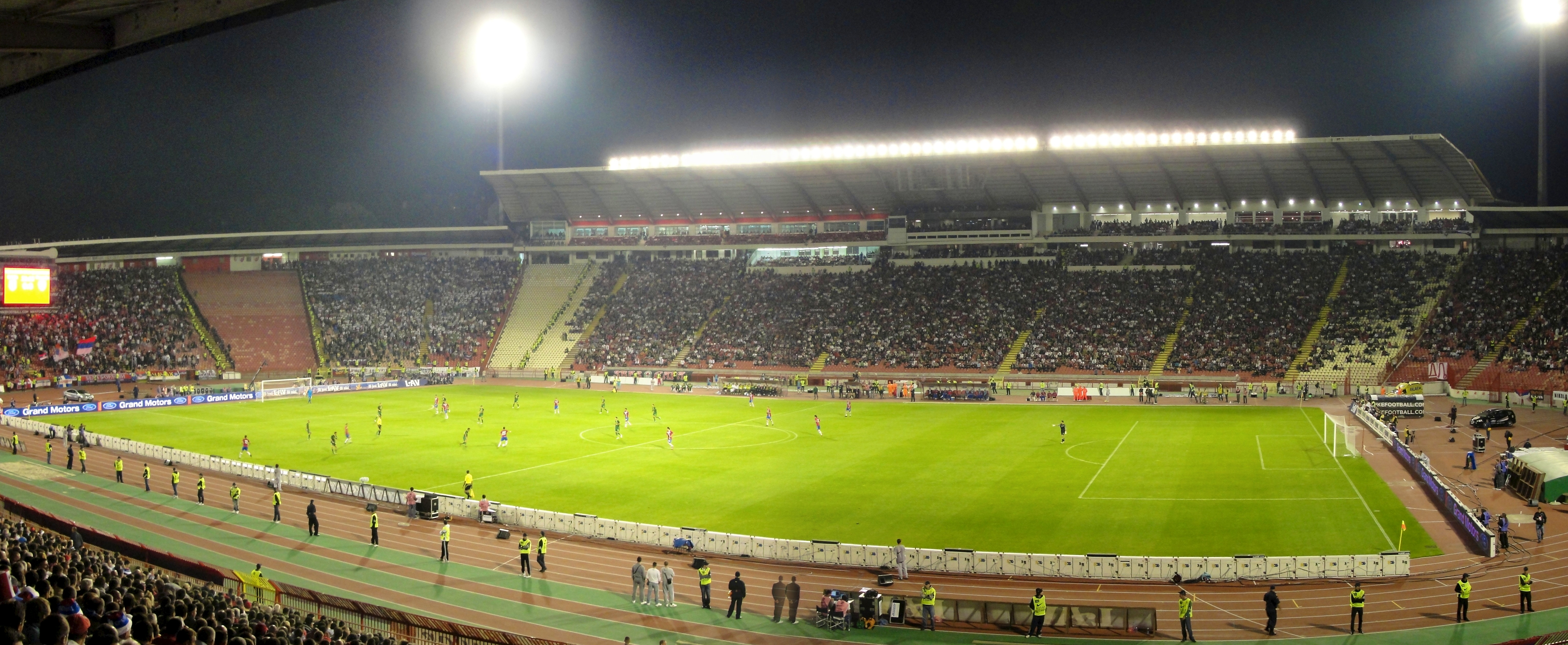
Serbia - Slovenija football match in Belgrade, 2010

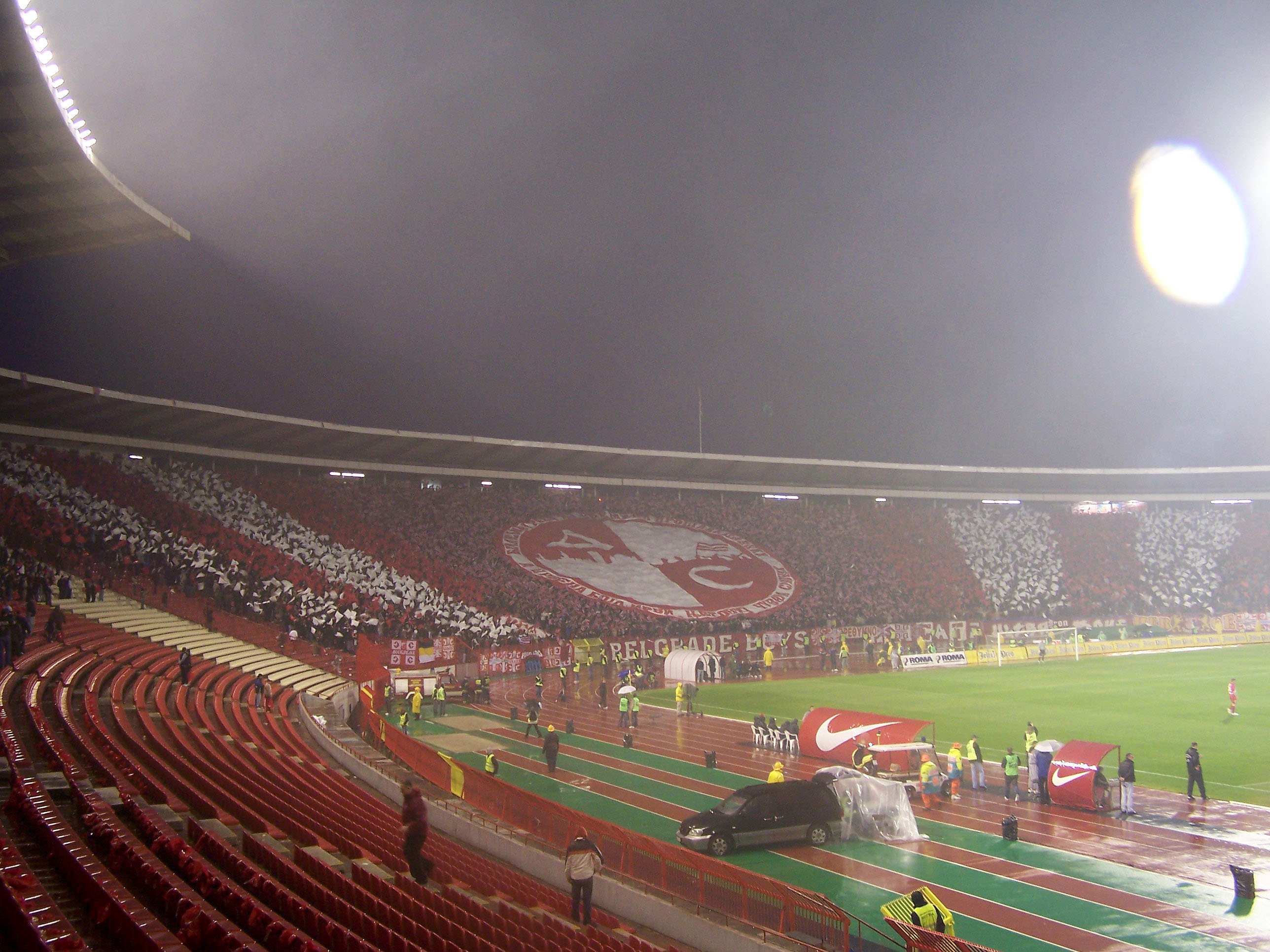
Delije during the FK Crvena Zvezda - FK Partizan match in Belgrade

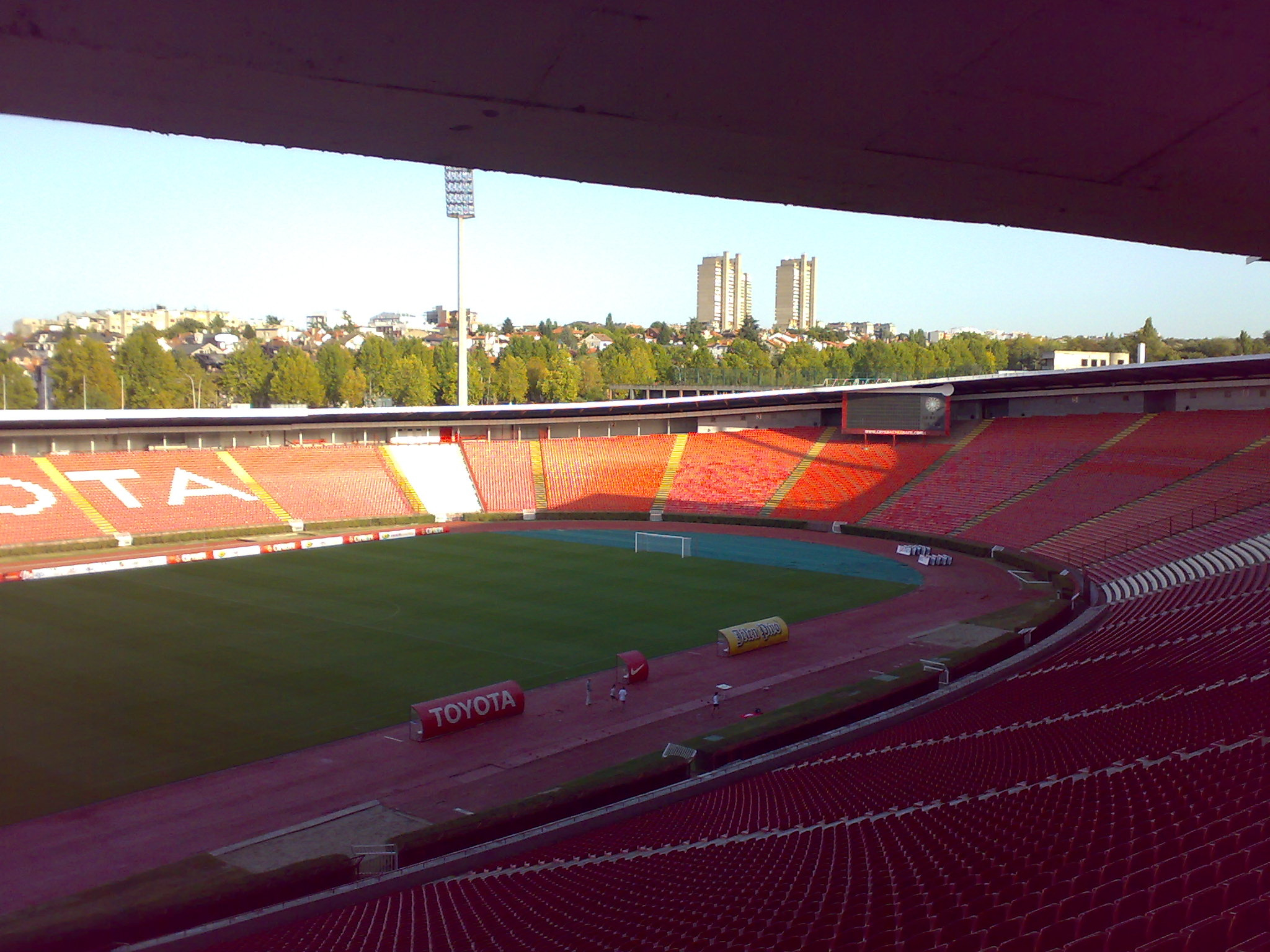
Red Star stadium, Belgrade

The stadium was built from 1960 to 1963, and fully financed by the GENEX company. To cut the costs, especially on the rebars, it was decided that the new venue will be partially dug into the ground. In order to prepare an adequate foundation for the construction, the stadium was to be started 12 m (39 ft) lower than the previous one. Over 350,000 m^{3} (12,000,000 cu ft) of soil and 15,000 m^{3} (530,000 cu ft) of stone had to be excavated. Soon, the problems occurred, as the digging threatened to trigger the landslide of the houses surrounding the site. At first, the experts suggested that the digging should stop and the project should be changed. The soil was probed, up to 8 m (26 ft) deep, and the formation called "Sarmatian limestone" was discovered, which meant that the deep foundation was possible on the west and south side and the project was continued. On the east side, the ground had to be filled.

The project was very expensive. A small part of the cost came from the donations of the Red Star fans, but that was not nearly enough. The majority of the funding came from the Executive Council, as the Government of Serbia was called at that time, which conditioned the funds with the construction of the athletic lanes. Construction was continued even after the inaugural match in 1963 and the costs amounted. Roof above the west stand was to be very expensive, with concrete arches, but prime minister Slobodan Penezić Krcun refused to grant that much money. Instead, an iron roof was built which was difficult to maintain. Because of the winds, the holes were left in the iron construction, but the auxiliary premises were built there even though they shouldn't have. Also, the workers' barracks at the auxiliary stadium were used by the club administration until the proper premises were built at the west stand in 1973. Administrative building also has a single room occupancy for the athletes. City wanted to buy the administrative building for its purposes, but the club refused and paid the building in full to the constructors.

After three years of construction, the new stadium was ready to be unveiled. The official opening took place on 1 September 1963 with the Yugoslav First League match against NK Rijeka (2-1). That day, some 55,000 spectators came through 9 entrance gates of 5 meters width each into the still unfinished stands. The very first visitor to the stadium is known to be Laza Petrović, a peasant from the Loznica vicinity. This fiery Red Star fan arrived to the new stadium early in the morning and took his place in the eastern stand. He took out cheese and a bannock from his bag, then ate his breakfast while he waited patiently until the late afternoon for the game to start.

The largest crowd was recorded that autumn at a derby against Partizan Belgrade – 108,000 people. Next year, after the stadium was fully completed its capacity increased to 110,000 spectators and it got the unofficial moniker - Marakana, in honour of the famous Brazilian stadium. Apart from the look, the new stadium also featured a magnificent grass pitch with drainage.

The first official goal at the stadium was scored by Trifun Mihailović in a youth match between Red Star and Jedinstvo from Zemun, a prelude to the first league match with NK Rijeka. The first official top division goal was scored by Nedeljko Vukoje from Rijeka while Dušan Maravić scored Red Star's first ever goal at the stadium, which resulted in a draw in the same game.

Still on the subject of records, according to the number of tickets sold, the stadium saw its largest crowd on 23 April 1975 at the Cup Winners Cup semi-final home leg against the Hungarian side Ferencváros 2–2. There were officially 96,070 spectators in the stands that night with purchased tickets, but it is believed that the stadium was filled to the maximum allowable capacity which at the time was 110,000.

In the years since, the stadium's capacity has gradually decreased. Following different modernization touch-ups, more seats were added. During the mid-1990s, in order to meet UEFA demands for spectators' comfort and security, standing places at the stadium were completely done away with. Seats were installed on all 4 stands so that the stadium's maximum capacity was 60,000.

In 2008, the club announced the reconstruction of the pitch in the stadium. Under-soil grass heaters were installed and new modern turf has replaced the old playing surface. The training pitch will also be renovated by laying down synthetic turf and installing new lighting equipment.

In 2014, the Assembly of Red Star decided unanimously to rename the stadium from Red Star Stadium to Rajko Mitić Stadium in honor of the late Red Star legend Rajko Mitić. On 19 November 2017, a monument to Mitić was ceremonially dedicated in front of the west stand.

After significant repairs in 2017–2018, the public bidding for the vast reconstruction project was announced in August 2018. The bidding, opened until September, included both the stadium and the entire sports complex. It included, among other changes, the lowering of the west stand and construction of the VIP section so as the removal of the athletic's track.

=== Proposed new stadium ===
In 2012, Red Stars executive board signed a memorandum for the reconstruction of the Rajko Mitić Stadium. The current stadium is expected to be redesigned by Chinese company NCEC (Natong Construction Engineering Constructing Co.) in corporation with Portuguese holding company Sonae Sierra. The 34.8 hectares of land, named Zvezdani Grad (English: Star City or Starry City), will include the stadium with approximately 50,000 seats, fitness center, ambulance, shopping and spa center, office towers, a five-star hotel, modern apartment blocks and underground parking. The area between the stadium and the shopping center, which will allow a visit in the summer, and winter conditions, will be used for markets, cafes, restaurants, and provide space for temporary exhibitions and performances. Ticket office and club shop will also be placed in this covered area. On the roof of the shopping center will be a public garden with entrance from the shopping center. The stadium will be covered with solar panels that will supplement the energy needs of the stadium; other areas will be used for collecting rainwater for irrigation of football fields and green areas of the complex. The new stadium will be recognized for the symbol of the club, the Red Star; the main structure of the stadium is to be in the form of a five-pointed star. The cost of the project is estimated to be between €450–600 million.

In 2023, the club announced that it is evaluating two locations for the new stadium: the current location and a place 300 meters away from the current venue. The club has further clarified that a reconstruction of the existing structure is not a viable option, as it would not enable Crvena Zvezda to achieve its objective of doubling season ticket sales from the current number of 6,000.

== Notable matches ==
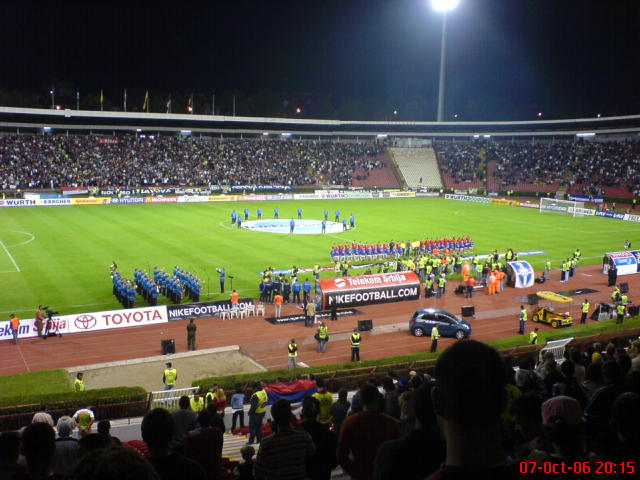
Serbia plays Belgium at Rajko Mitić, 7 October 2006

- Ajax's 1–0 defeat of Juventus in the 1973 European Cup Final is among the record attendances on Belgrade's Marakana. There were 91,564 spectators in the stands (the third highest attendance on the stadium's official all-time list), who came out to see the European football stars of the day such as Ruud Krol, Johan Neeskens, Johnny Rep, Johan Cruijff, Dino Zoff, Fabio Capello, José Altafini, Roberto Bettega, and others.
- Another major international football competition was played at Red Star's stadium – 1976 UEFA European Championship. Marakana actually hosted two memorable matches: the semi-final, which hosts Yugoslavia lost 2–4 to West Germany in extra-time after leading 2–0 for much of the game, and the final on 20 June that saw Czechoslovakia upset West Germany 5–3 on penalties, after the game was deadlocked a 2–2 after extra time. The winning penalty was scored by Antonín Panenka, who chipped the ball down the middle – a technique named after the Czechoslovak midfielder.
- On 24 April 1991, Red Star Belgrade and Bayern Munich contested a European Champions Cup semifinal tie.
- In the Autumn of 1996, Red Star hosted 1. FC Kaiserslautern and FC Barcelona as part of its round of 32 and round of 16, respectively, Cup Winners' Cup ties.

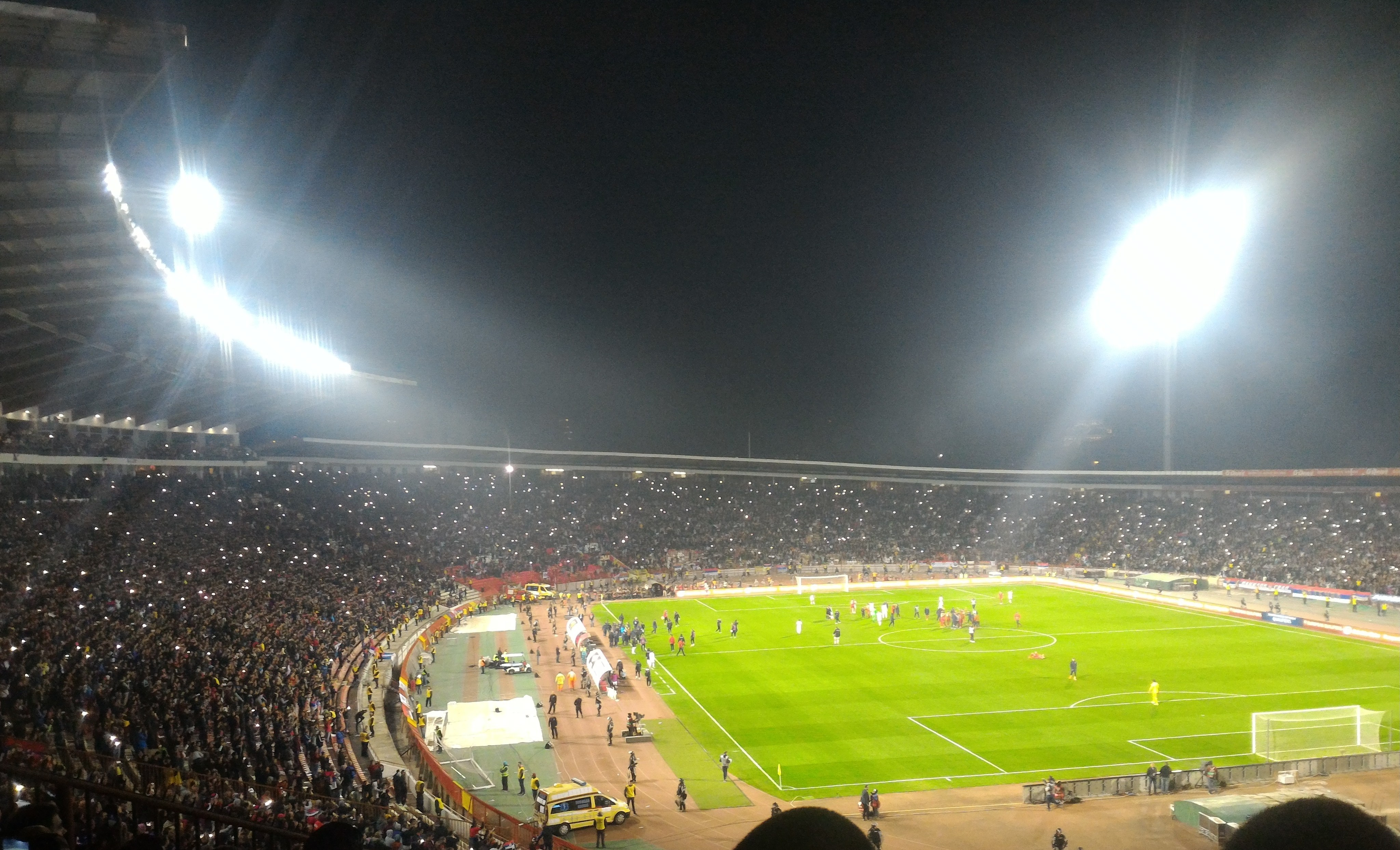
Serbia vs Georgia played on 9 October 2017, a 1–0 win that secured Serbia a spot in the 2018 FIFA World Cup in Russia

- On 12 October 2005, the Serbia and Montenegro national team played a deciding match on the last matchday of 2006 World Cup qualifying versus Bosnia and Herzegovina. Serbia-Montenegro qualified directly for Germany 2006.
- On 25 October 2007, Red Star hosted FC Bayern Munich in a UEFA Cup Group F match. Red Star Belgrade supporters left the stadium with a feeling of great frustration, because although their team were a goal up twice, then they conceded two goals in the last minutes of the game and lost 2–3. Red Star Belgrade then went on to lose its remaining three matches and finished at the bottom of Group F with 0 points. The atmosphere on the "Marakana" was incredible, with the 55,000 fans present on the stadium resembling the atmosphere of 1990-91 European Cup semifinal between these two teams.
- On 6 November 2018, Red Star hosted eventual trophy winners Liverpool in a UEFA Champions League Group C match. Red Star won 2–0 with both goals scored by Milan Pavkov. It was one of the biggest wins in Red Star's recent history.

== Concerts ==
Marakana has seldom been used as a concert venue in its 45-year history.

The most notable performer is Zdravko Čolić who held massive shows at Marakana on three occasions. The first was on 5 September 1978 as part of his famous Putujući Urnebes Tour—70,000 people showed up. The opening acts and guests were Dado Topić & Mama Coco, Kornelije Kovač, Arsen Dedić, Kemal Monteno, and Lokice dance group.

Other concerts at the stadium included YU Rock Misija on 15 June 1985, a show that lasted 8 hours in front of a gathered crowd of 30,000 people though they were not allowed onto the stadium's pitch by the decision of Red Star's management.

On 30 June 2001, almost twenty-three years after his previous show at the stadium, Čolić made another appearance promoting his Okano album in front of 85,000 spectators.

Serbian folk singer Ceca held a huge concert on 15 June 2002 in front of 70,000 people.

On 23 June 2007, Čolić promoted his Zavičaj album with another huge concert, his third at the Marakana, in front of 70,000 spectators.

Most recently, Aca Lukas played a show at the stadium on 8 June 2013 in front of 50,000 people.

== Other ==
In addition to football matches and concerts, the stadium has hosted the following events:

- Mate Parlov vs. Domenico Adinolfi - EBU Light Heavyweight title fight, 10 June 1976
- Slobodan Živojinović vs. Boris Becker - exhibition tennis match, 1 October 1987

== See also ==
- List of football stadiums in Serbia
- Red Star Belgrade
- Delije
- Lists of stadiums

Preceded by De Kuip; Rotterdam	European Cup; Final venue 1973	Succeeded by Heysel Stadium; Brussels
Preceded by Heysel Stadium; Brussels	UEFA European Championship; Final venue 1976	Succeeded by Stadio Olimpico; Rome
