= Zbog tebe =

Zbog tebe may refer to:

- Zbog tebe (Zdravko Čolić album), 1980
- Zbog tebe (Indira Radić album), 1993
