= Ako priđeš bliže =

Studio album by Zdravko Čolić
- Released: 1977.
- Studio: Jugoton Studio, Zagreb
- Genre: pop, pop-rock
- Length: 39:18
- Label: Jugoton
- Producer: Kornelije Kovač

Zdravko Čolić chronology
Ti i ja (1975)	Ako priđeš bliže (1977)	Zbog tebe (1980)

Ako priđeš bliže is the second studio album by Zdravko Čolić, released on 1977.

The album remains Čolić's most critically acclaimed album, and one of the best selling albums in Yugoslavia. It polled at number 38 on the list of 100 greatest Yugoslav rock and pop albums in the book YU 100: najbolji albumi jugoslovenske rok i pop muzike (YU 100: The Best Albums of Yugoslav Pop and Rock Music). It was the highest polled album by Čolić on the list.

== Track listing ==
Ako priđeš bliže
No.	Title	Lyrics	Music	Length
1.	"Pjevam danju, pjevam noću" (I Sing At Day, I Sing At Night)	Branko Radičević	Kornelije Kovač	4:00
2.	"Produži dalje" (Move Along)	Bora Đorđević	K. Kovač	3:15
3.	"Jedna zima sa Kristinom" (A Winter With Kristina)	K. Kovač	K. Kovač	5:25
4.	"Igra" (Game)	Spomenka Kovač	K. Kovač	3:35
5.	"Zagrli me" (Hold Me)	Arsen Dedić	Arsen Dedić	3:55
6.	"Glavo luda" (Crazy Head)	Duško Trifunović	Ranko Boban	3:24
7.	"Nevjerna žena" (Unfaithful Woman)	Milenko "Mišo" Marić	Slobodan "Bodo" Kovačević	4:04
8.	"Jedina" (The Only One)	A. Dedić & K. Kovač	Kemal Monteno	3:24
9.	"Ljubomora" (Jealousy)	D. Trifunović	K. Kovač	4:17
10.	"Juče još" (Only Yesterday)	A. Dedić	Josip Boček	4:05

== Personnel ==
- Josip Boček: Electric guitars
- Slobodan A. Kovačević: Acoustic guitars
- Kornelije Kovač: Hohner D6 Clavinet, Fender Rhodes, Steinway acoustic piano, ARP Omni, Mini and Micromoog synthesizers, percussion
- Čarli Novak: Bass
- Vjekoslav Benzon: Drums
- Uroš Šećerov: Percussion
- All songs arranged by Kornelije Kovač except for "Juče još", which was arranged by Josip Boček.

== Similar songs ==
- Madonna's "La Isla Bonita" uses the same chorus melody as Čolić's "Glavo luda".
