= Ti i ja =

Studio album by Zdravko Čolić
- Released: 1975.
- Studio: Jugoton Studio, Zagreb
- Genre: Pop, Rock and roll, Baroque pop, Pop-rock
- Length: 34:24
- Label: Jugoton
- Producer: Kornelije Kovač

Zdravko Čolić chronology
Ti i ja (1975)	Ako priđeš bliže (1977)

Ti i ja (You and Me) is a studio album by Zdravko Čolić released in 1975.

== Track listing ==
Ti i ja
No.	Title	Lyrics	Music	Length
1.	"Vagabund" (Vagabond)	Kornelije Kovač	K. Kovač	4:00
2.	"Loše vino" (Bad Wine)	Arsen Dedić	Goran Bregović	3:15
3.	"Ostanimo prijatelji" (Let's Stay Friends)	Mirjana Ilić	K. Kovač	5:25
4.	"A sad sam ja na redu" (And Now It's My Turn)	K. Kovač	K. Kovač	3:35
5.	"Ljubav je ljubav" (Love is Love)	Kemal Monteno	K. Monteno	3:55
6.	"Zvao sam je Emili" (I Called Her Emily)	K. Kovač	K. Kovač	3:24
7.	"Ti si svijetlo, ja sam tama" (You're The Light, I'm The Darkness)	A. Dedić	A. Dedić	4:04
8.	"Život je lijep, Helene Marie" (Life Is Beautiful, Helen Marie)	K. Kovač	K. Kovač	3:24
9.	"Poslije raskoši i sjaja" (After The Luxury And Glow)	Spomenka Kovač	K. Kovač	4:17
10.	"Igraš se vatrom" (You're Playing With Fire)	G. Bregović	G. Bregović	4:05
