= Malo pojačaj radio =

Studio album by Zdravko Čolić
- Released: 1981.
- Recorded: October–November 1981
- Studio: Britannia Row Studios, London
- Genre: pop, pop-rock, new wave
- Label: Jugoton
- Producer: Kornelije Kovač & Goran Bregović

Zdravko Čolić chronology
Zbog tebe (1980)	Malo pojačaj radio (1981)	Šta mi radiš (1983)

Malo pojačaj radio (Turn Up the Radio a Bit) is the fourth studio album by Zdravko Čolić released in 1981 by the record label Jugoton. The album tackles a more rock-ish sound for the then thirty-year-old Čolić, who had (up to this point) mostly worked a straight pop music vein.

The authors on the record are Đorđe Balašević, Goran Bregović, Đorđe Novković, and Marina Tucaković.

== Track listing ==
Malo pojačaj radio
No.	Title	Lyrics	Music	Length
1.	"Mađarica" (Hungarian Woman)	Đorđe Balašević & Goran Bregović	Kornelije Kovač & G. Bregović	4:00
2.	"Sjedni mi u krilo" (Sit On My Lap)	G. Bregović & Marina Tucaković	G. Bregović & K. Kovač	3:15
3.	"Zbogom Ivana" (Goodbye Ivana)	G. Bregović	G. Bregović & K. Kovač	5:25
4.	"Adam i Eva" (Adam and Eve)	G. Bregović & Ivica Pinjuh	G. Bregović & K. Kovač	3:35
5.	"Rođendanska pjesma" (Birthday Song)	G. Bregović	G. Bregović & K. Kovač	3:55
6.	"Malo pojačaj radio" (Turn the Radio Up a Bit)	G. Bregović	G. Bregović & K. Kovač	3:24
7.	"Što si prepotentna" (Why So Arrogant, Girl)	M. Tucaković	Zdravko Čolić	4:04
8.	"Nove lakovane cipelice" (New Varnished Shoes)	G. Bregović	Đorđe Novković	3:24
9.	"Oktobar je, počinje sezona kiša" (It's October, the Rain Season is Upon Us)	G. Bregović	Z. Čolić, G. Bregović & K. Kovač	4:17
10.	"Kažeš da ti nekad izgledam k'o Dunav" (You Say I Sometimes Look Like the Danube To You)	Đ. Balašević	K. Kovač	4:05

== Note ==
- The song "Oktobar je, počinje sezona kiša" is a Serbian language cover version of song "Hold the Line", of American rock group Toto.
