= Čarolija =

Studio album by Zdravko Čolić
- Released: December 2003
- Recorded: May–November 2003
- Studio: Areta Studio, Belgrade; PGP RTS Studio V, Belgrade; Studio Rockoko, Zagreb
- Genre: Pop
- Label: BK Sound
- Producer: Saša Habić; Kornelije Kovač

Zdravko Čolić chronology
Okano (2000)	Čarolija (2003)	Zavičaj (2006)

Čarolija is the eleventh studio album by Zdravko Čolić, released in December 2003. Bora Đorđević, Bajaga, Nikša Bratoš, Arsen Dedić, Kemal Monteno, Đorđe David, Aleksandra Kovač and Đorđe Balašević took part in this album.

== Track listing ==
No.	Title	Length
1.	"Biti il' ne biti (To Be Or Not To Be)"	4:08
2.	"Zaboravljaš, zar ne? (You're Forgetting, Aren't You?)"	3:37
3.	"Ao nono bijela (Hey, White Legs)"	4:27
4.	"Moja draga (My Dear)"	4:51
5.	"Mnogo hvala (Thanks A Lot)"	4:10
6.	"Ničiji i svačiji (No One's And Everyone's)"	5:34
7.	"Ako jednom budeš sama (If You're Alone Once)"	4:40
8.	"Bila si bolja (You Were Better)"	4:32
9.	"Zločin i kazna (Crime And Punishment)"	4:11
10.	"Na ovaj dan (On This Day)"	5:08
11.	"Pjevaj, pjevaj na kletoj gitari (Sing, Sing On A Cursed Guitar)"	6:54

== Sound-alikes and covers ==
- Song Mnogo hvala sampled Benzina by Massimo Savić.
- This album also contains covers of Indexi (Ako jednom budeš sama, dedicated to Davorin Popović) and Oleg Gazmanov (Zločin i kazna)
