= Kad pogledaš me preko ramena Tour =

2010–13 concert tour by Zdravko Čolić

Coordinates: 57.7045°N 11.9757°E

- Tour by Zdravko Čolić
- Promotional poster for the concert in Zenica, at Arena Zenica, April 2012
- Associated album: Kad pogledaš me preko ramena
- Start date: 14 February 2010
- End date: 31 December 2013
- Legs: 5
- No. of shows: 49 in Europe; 8 in North America; 57 total

Zdravko Čolić concert chronology
- Zavičaj Tour (2006–09); Kad pogledaš me preko ramena Tour (2010–13); Vatra i barut Tour (2014–17)

The Kad pogledaš me preko ramena Tour was a 2010–13 worldwide concert tour by Serbian singer Zdravko Čolić, in support of his thirteenth studio album, Kad pogledaš me preko ramena ("When you look at me over the shoulder"). It began on February 14, 2010, in Split, Croatia at the Spaladium Arena, but officially started on July 31, 2010, in Sarajevo, Bosnia and Herzegovina at the stadium Kosevo and continued throughout Canada and Europe. It ended on December 31, 2013.

== Shows ==
List of concerts, showing date, city, country, venue & tickets sold
Date	City	Country	Venue	Attendance
Leg 1 — Europe
February 14, 2010	Split	Croatia	Spaladium Arena	12,000 sold out
May 14, 2010	Prague	Czech Republic	Sasazu club	2,000
Leg 2 — North America
May 21, 2010	Vancouver	Canada		
May 22, 2010	Edmonton	Canada		
May 28, 2010	Montreal	Canada		
May 29, 2010	Toronto	Canada	Kool Haus	3,000 sold out
Leg 3 — Europe
July 31, 2010	Sarajevo	Bosnia and Herzegovina	Koševo Stadium	60,000
November 12, 2010	Stockholm	Sweden		2,000
November 13, 2010	Gothenburg	Sweden		1,500
November 27, 2010	Zürich	Switzerland	Stadhalle Dietikon	3,500+
December 4, 2010	Munich	Germany	Medley Tetex Teslic	2,500
December 11, 2010	Vienna	Austria	Gasometer	3,000
December 25, 2010	Skopje	Macedonia	Boris Trajkovski Sports Center	12,000+
Mart 05, 2011	Frankfurt	Germany	Union hale	2,000
March 12, 2011	Stuttgart	Germany	Flash club	1,500
April 2, 2011	Nijmegen	Netherlands	Quick hall	2,000
April 9, 2011	Berlin	Germany	Universall hall	3,000
April 30, 2011	Düsseldorf	Germany	club Ambis	2,000
May 7, 2011	Hamburg	Germany		1,500
May 21, 2011	Luxembourg			
June 25, 2011	Belgrade	Serbia	Ušće	100,000
July 17, 2011	Prilep	Macedonia	Beer fest	150,000
August 28, 2011	Makedonska Kamenica	Macedonia	trg	15,000
September 17, 2011	Niš	Serbia	Niš Fortress	15,000
November 5, 2011	Zaječar	Serbia	City hall	3,500 sold out
November 19, 2011	Zürich	Switzerland	Stadhalle Dietikon	3,500
November 26, 2011	Vienna	Austria	Gasometer	3,000 sold out
December 10, 2011	Ljubljana	Slovenia	Arena Stožice	14,000 sold out
December 24, 2011	Novi Sad	Serbia	SPC Vojvodina	12,000
December 31, 2011	Bor	Serbia	gradski trg	10,000+
January 28, 2012	Salzburg	Austria	Modezentrum Hale	2,000
March 8, 2012	Zagreb	Croatia	Arena Zagreb	20,000
April 21, 2012	Zenica	Bosnia and Hercegovina	Arena Zenica	10,000
April 28, 2012	Šabac	Serbia	Hipodrom	12,000
June 1, 2012	Banja Luka	Bosnia and Hercegovina	Trg Krajine	30,000
June 30, 2012	Tuzla	Bosnia and Hercegovina	Stadion Tušanj	10,000
August 1, 2012	Ohrid	Macedonia	SRC Biljanini izvori	20,000 sold out
August 4, 2012	Pula	Croatia	Pula Arena	6,000
August 12, 2012	Budva	Montenegro	Top Hill	5,000 sold out
August 26, 2012	Novi Bečej	Serbia	Velikogospojinski dani fest	40,000
August 30, 2012	Mostar	Bosnia and Hercegovina	Daleka obala-Gradski bazen	2,000
September 8, 2012	Slavonski Brod	Croatia	Fortress	7,000
Leg 4 — North America
September 28, 2012	Chicago	United States	Hanging Gardens	2,000
September 29, 2012	Detroit	United States	MCC	1,200
October 5, 2012	Boston	United States	club LIDO	1,500
October 6, 2012	New York City	United States	Pure NYC	2,000 sold out
Leg 5 — Europe
December 22, 2012	Bergen	Netherlands		1,500
December 31, 2012	Budva	Montenegro	trg	20,000
Mart 09, 2013	Ljubljana	Slovenia	Cvetličarna	3,500
May 18, 2013	Portorož	Slovenia	Avditorij	2,000
June 21, 2013	Primošten	Croatia	Aurora club	5,000
August 9, 2013	Dubrovnik	Croatia	stadium Gospino polje	7,000
November 2, 2013	Stuttgart	Germany	Carl Benz Center	3,500
November 7, 2013	Vienna	Austria	Pyramide	3,500
November 16, 2013	Zürich	Switzerland	Stadhalle Dietikon	3,000
November 23, 2013	Munich	Germany	Heide Voln hall	2,000
December 31, 2013	Petrovac	Montenegro	Hotel Palas	2,000
Total				668,400
