= Ti si mi u krvi =

Studio album by Zdravko Čolić
- Released: 1984.
- Studios: Studio I RTV Sarajevo, Sarajevo
- Genres: Pop; Folk-rock; Pop-folk
- Label: Diskoton / Kamarad
- Producer: Kornelije Kovač

Zdravko Čolić chronology
Šta mi radiš (1983)	Ti si mi u krvi (1984)	Zdravko Čolić (1988)

Ti si mi u krvi is the sixth studio album by Bosnian pop singer Zdravko Čolić, released on 1984.

After five studio albums for Jugoton, this was Čolić's first studio release for a different label as a co-operation project between Diskoton and Kamarad, a newly established privately owned music label co-owned by Čolić and Goran Bregović.

The title track is one of the most popular ballads of ex-Yugoslav pop music.

== Track listing ==
Ti si mi u krvi
No.	Title	Lyrics	Music	Length
1.	"Ruška"	Marina Tucaković	Kornelije Kovač	3:41
2.	"Ustani, sestro" (Stand Up, Sister)	Goran Gunjak & Ranko Boban	R. Boban	3:13
3.	"Ti možeš sve, al' jedno ne" (You Can Do Anything, But Not One Thing)	Momčilo Bajagić	K. Kovač	4:34
4.	"Cura iz Zenice" (A Girl From Zenica)	M. Bajagić	K. Kovač	3:17
5.	"Ti si mi u krvi" (You're In My Blood)	Spomenka Kovač	K. Kovač	4:57
6.	"Vala, vrijeme je" (Well, It's Time)	Đorđe Balašević	Josip Boček	3:22
7.	"Južnjaci" (Southern People)	M. Tucaković	Đorđe Novković	3:43
8.	"Pamti me po dobru" (Remember Me By Good)	Dragana Ivić	K. Kovač	4:05
9.	"Osvojio bi sve" (I'd Conquer All)	M. Tucaković	Aleksandar "Futa" Radulović	3:37
10.	"Sto cigana" (A Hundred Gypsies)	R. Boban	R. Boban	4:02

== Cover versions ==
- The song "Ti si mi u krvi" was covered by Serbian singer Željko Samardžić, on his 1998 covers album "Nostalgija"
- A cover version of the same song was released in 2011, by Bosnian hard-rock band Teška industrija, as the first single of their covers album "Bili smo raja".

== Sampling ==
- The chorus melody of the song "Ti možeš sve al' jedno ne" is used for Hari Mata Hari's 1989 song "Ti znaš sve" and Cher's 1998 song "Believe".
- Also, the same chorus melody as in the song "Ti si mi u krvi" is used for Ana Stanić's 1998 song "Sama", fourteen years later.
