= Šta mi radiš =

Studio album by Zdravko Čolić
- Released: 1983; 43 years ago
- Recorded: January–February 1983
- Studio: Snake Ranch Studio, London; Atmosphere Studio, London; Sarm Studios, London
- Genre: Pop; Pop-rock; Jazz
- Label: Jugoton
- Producer: Kornelije Kovač

Zdravko Čolić chronology
Malo pojačaj radio (1981)	Šta mi radiš (1983)	Ti si mi u krvi (1984)

Šta mi radiš is the fifth studio album by Zdravko Čolić, released in 1983.

It would be the last studio album Čolić did for Jugoton as the label and the artist parted ways after five hugely successful albums.

== Track listing ==
1. Cherie, Cherie (Đ. Novković, M. Tucaković)
2. Afrika (Africa) (M. Bajagić - M. Aleksić, M. Bajagić)
3. Stanica Podlugovi (Podlugovi Train Station) (K. Kovač, V. Dijak)
4. Crne čarape (Black Stockings) (K. Kovač, M. Tucaković)
5. Konačno sam (Alone At Last) (Kika Mac, M. Tucaković)
6. Šta mi radiš (What Are You Doing To Me) (K. Kovač, M. Tucaković)
7. Daj mi to (Give Me That) (Đ. Novković, K. Kovač - Đ. Novković)
8. Tvoje oči (Your Eyes) (M. Bajagić - M. Aleksić, M. Bajagić)
9. Pobjegnimo koji dan na more (Let's Run Away To Sea For A Couple Of Days) (A. Dedić)
10. Brodolomci (Castaways) (K. Kovač, A. Dedić)
11. Doviđenja (Goodbye) (K. Kovač, A. Dedić)

== Sampling ==
- The same verse and chorus melody as in the song "Tvoje oči" is used for R.E.M.'s 2001 song "All the Way to Reno (You're Gonna Be a Star)", eighteen years later.

== Personnel ==
- Engineers:[Steve Rance, Bruce Stewarts, Bob Painter
- Luis Jardim - Bass guitar, Drum programming and other percussion
- Hans Zimmer - synthesizer
- Tom Blades - Guitar
- Tony Bears - Drums
- Ray Warleigh - Saxophone
- Gavin Wright - Strings
- Backing vocals: Linda Jardim, Aleksandars Mežek, and Kornelije Kovač
- Kornelije Kovač - Keyboards, Arrangements and Production
