= Trebević =

Mountain near Sarajevo

- IUCN category V (protected landscape/seascape)
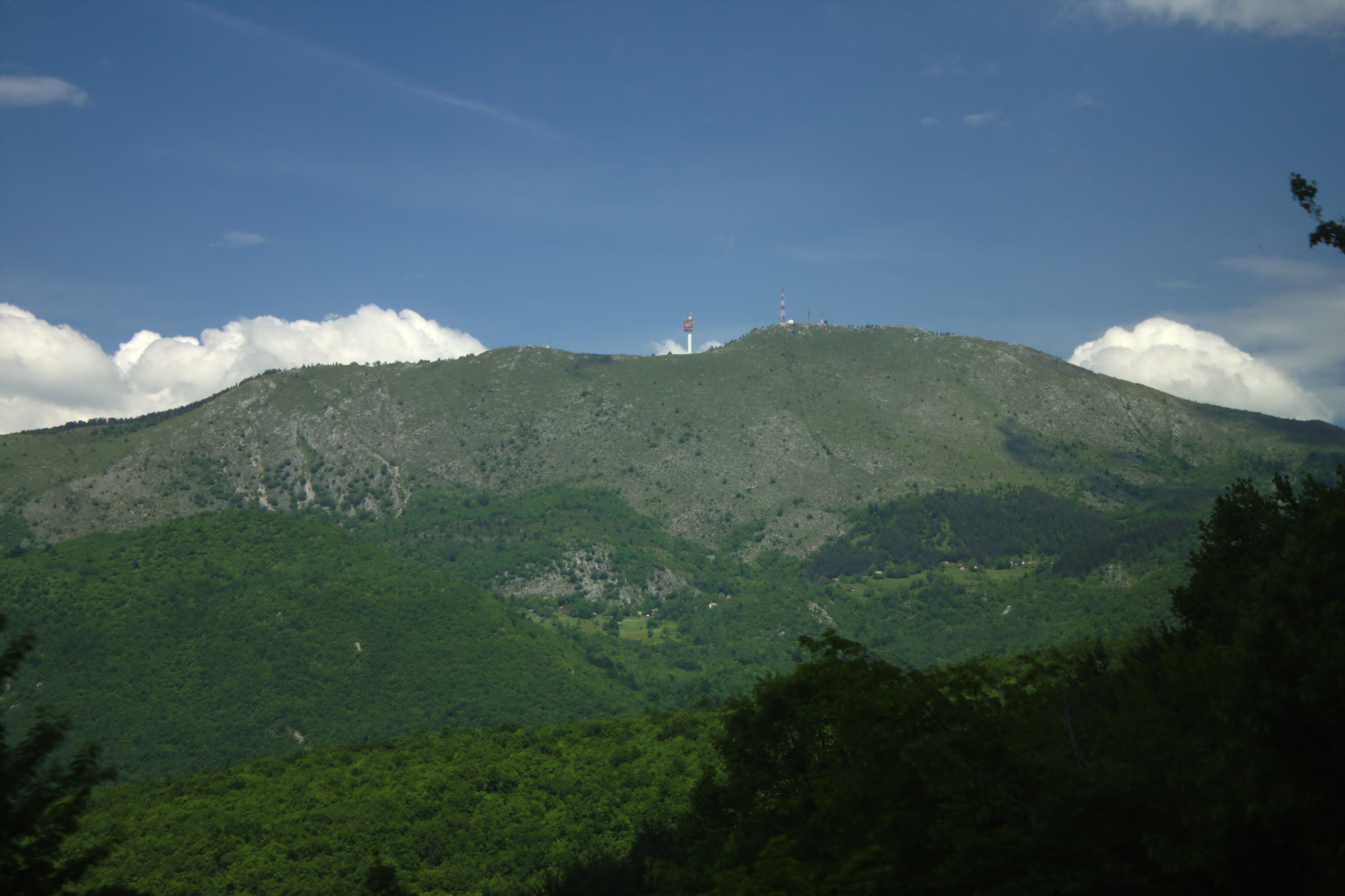
- Trebević mountain view from Istočno Sarajevo

- Location within Bosnia and Herzegovina
- Location: Bosnia and Herzegovina
- Coordinates: 43°49′07″N 18°27′36″E
- Area: 4.0 km^{2} (1.5 sq mi)
- Established: 2014
Trebević
Highest point
- Elevation: 1,628 m (5,341 ft)
- Prominence: 345 m (1,132 ft)
Geography
- Parent range: Dinaric Alps

Trebević (Serbian Cyrillic: Требевић) is a mountain in central Bosnia and Herzegovina, located in the territories of Republika Srpska, Sarajevo and Istočno Sarajevo, bordering Jahorina mountain. Trebević is 1,628 meters (5,341 ft) tall, making it the second shortest of the Sarajevo mountains.

During the Middle Ages, Trebević was known as Zlatni Do. During the 1984 Winter Olympics Trebević, like the other Sarajevo mountains, was used for several Olympic events, such as bobsledding.

Trebević today is important as a tourist destination for citizens of Sarajevo as Igman or Bjelašnica. Most of the land mines are now cleared from heavy fighting that took place in the early 1990s. There are a few hotels, mountaineering homes, and other such structures on Trebević and the immediate area. The mountain is very popular for family picnics, hiking, climbing, mountain biking and it has a downhill track for local and international skiing competitions.

Trebević has been the main excursion site for Sarajevo citizens due to the favorable geographical position, climate and the beauty of the nature. The biological diversity is among the highest and it is extraordinary to find such a phenomenon near the heart of the big city. On 9 April 2014, Sarajevo Canton Assembly declared Trebević a protected area, in order to conserve and improve each element of the geographical and biological diversity.

Trebević can be reached from Sarajevo by the Trebević Cable Car, which starts from the neighbourhood of Bistrik.

== Mineral and crystal deposits ==
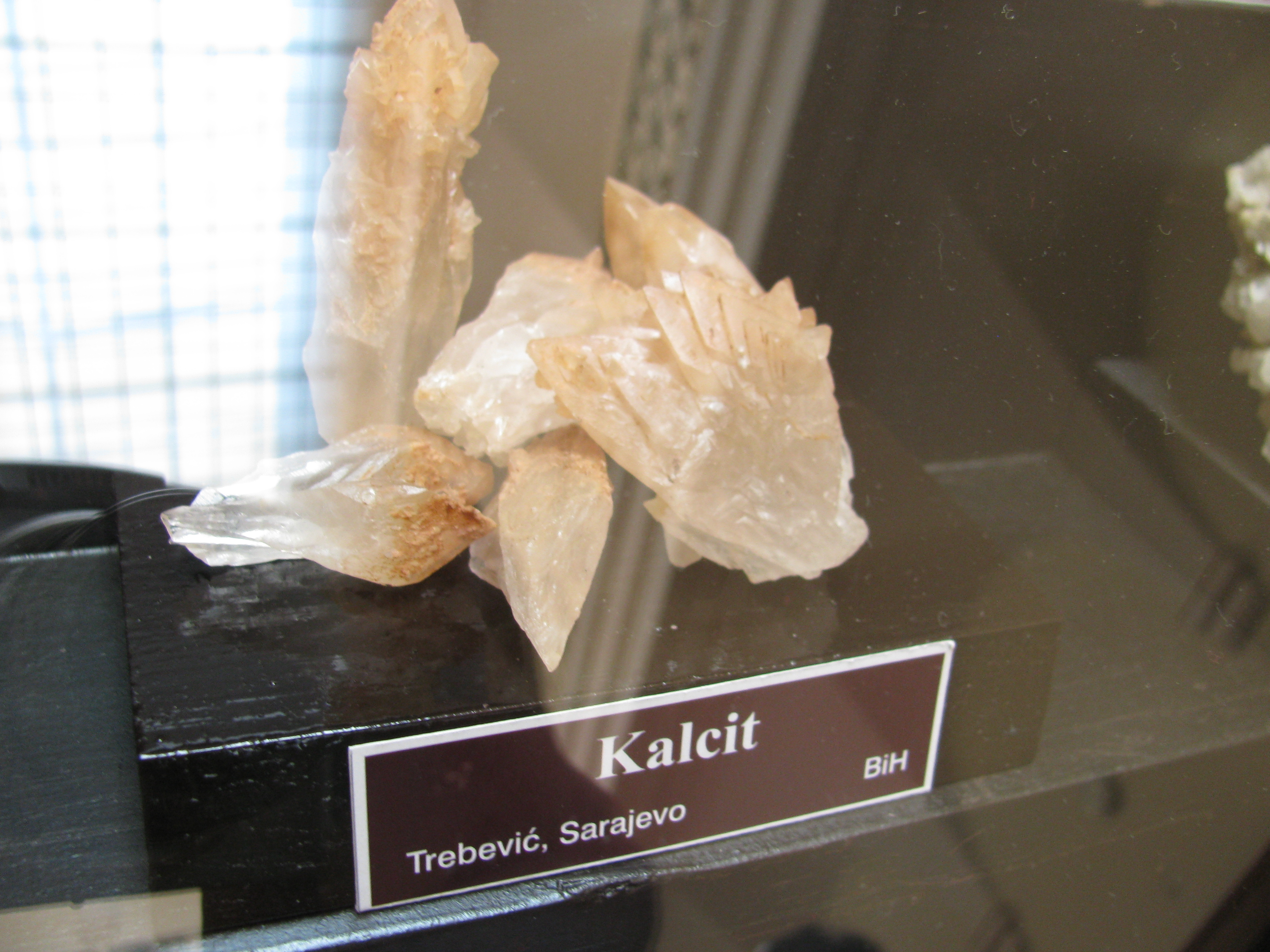
Calcite crystal found at Trebević mountain around Sarajevo; Bosnia and Herzegovina on display at National Museum of Bosnia and Herzegovina.

The area is known to contain quartz, siderite, and calcite crystal deposits, and one such item is on display in Sarajevo at the National Museum of Bosnia and Herzegovina.

== History ==
=== Orthodox cross controversy ===
In March 2008, a Bosnian Serb organization Savez logoraša Republike Srpske (Association of Bosnian Serb War Prisoners), led by Branislav Dukić, announced its intention to erect a giant 26-meter (85 ft) high Orthodox Christian cross at the part of the mountain on Republika Srpska territory in order to commemorate the Serb victims in Sarajevo during the Bosnian War. The idea followed a move by Bosnian Croats who erected a Catholic Christian cross on Hum Hill above Mostar, remembering Croats killed there during the Bosnian War. High Representative for Bosnia and Herzegovina Miroslav Lajčák asked Republika Srpska authorities not to allow the construction of the cross.

The structure was built in early 2014, only for it to be demolished within a month by persons unknown. There has recently been talk about its reconstruction; however, this has yet to materialise due to the fear of it being demolished once again.

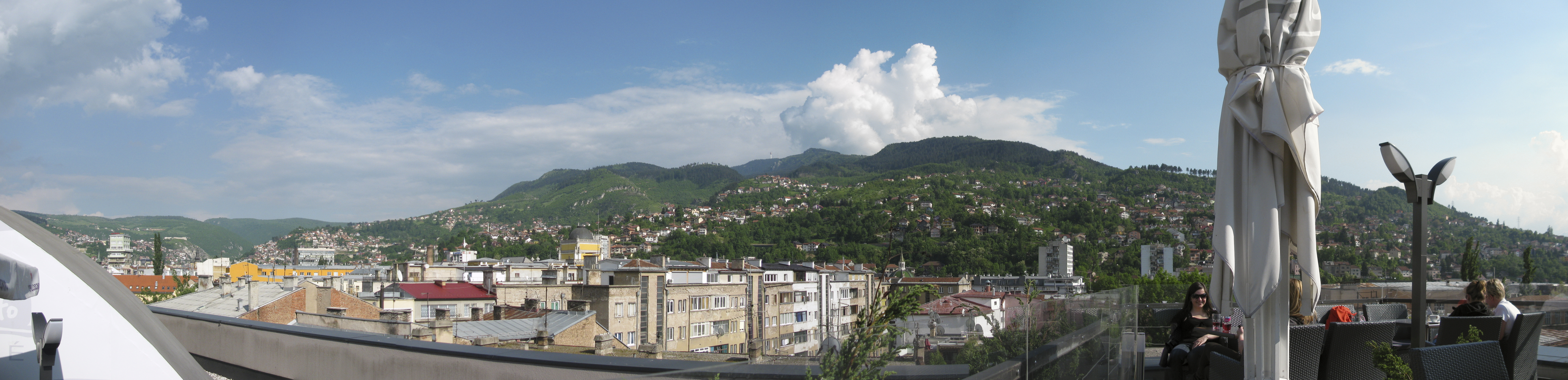
Panoramic view of Mount Trebević from Sarajevo.

== Bibliography ==
- Guber, Mihovil (1943). "Pustošenje planinarskih objekata u južnoj Hrvatskoj" [The Desolation of Mountain Objects in Southern Croatia] (PDF). Hrvatski planinar (in Croatian). Vol. 39, no. 6–7. pp. 85–93. ISSN 0354-0650.
