= Vatra i barut Tour =

2014–17 concert tour by Zdravko Čolić

Coordinates: 57.7045°N 11.9757°E

- Tour by Zdravko Čolić
- Promotional poster for the concert in Subotica, at Hala sportova, December 2016
- Associated album: Vatra i barut
- Start date: 8 March 2014
- End date: 31 December 2017
- Legs: 3
- No. of shows: 63 in Europe; 1 in Asia; 1 in Canada; 4 in USA; 4 in Australia; 73 total

Zdravko Čolić concert chronology
- Kad pogledaš me preko ramena Tour (2010–13); Vatra i barut Tour (2014–17); Ono malo sreće Tour (2018–19)

The Vatra i barut Tour was a 2014–17 worldwide concert tour by Bosnian singer Zdravko Čolić, in support of his fourteenth studio album, Vatra i barut (Fire and Gunpowder). It began on March 8, 2014, in Malmö, Sweden at the Amiralen and continued throughout Europe, Australia, USA and Canada. It ended on December 31, 2017.

== Shows ==
List of concerts, showing date, city, country, venue & tickets sold
Date	City	Country	Venue	Attendance
Leg 1 — Europe
March 8, 2014	Malmö	Sweden	Amiralen	3,000 sold out
March 29, 2014	Munich	Germany	Kesselhaus	2,000
May 31, 2014	Skopje	Macedonia	Boris Trajkovski Sports Center	10,000
June 8, 2014	Zadar	Croatia	Krešimir Ćosić Hall	9,000 sold out
June 14, 2014	Zürich	Switzerland	Elite Club	2,000 sold out
June 20, 2014	Ljubljana	Slovenia	Ilirija Sports Park	15,000
August 3, 2014	Vodnjan	Croatia	LMC Club	4,000
August 17, 2014	Strumica	Macedonia	Strumica Open Festival	60,000+
August 24, 2014	Budva	Montenegro	Top Hill	5,000
November 29, 2014	Sarajevo	Bosnia and Herzegovina	Zetra	17,000 sold out
December 12, 2014	Belgrade	Serbia	Kombank Arena	40,000 sold out
December 13, 2014	Belgrade	Serbia	Kombank Arena	40,000 sold out
December 31, 2014	Zlatibor	Serbia	Kraljev trg	40,000+
February 14, 2015	Osijek	Croatia	Gradski vrt Hall	6,000
Leg 2 — Asia
February 20, 2015	Dubai	United Arab Emirates	Hilton Dubai Jumeirah	2,000
Leg 3 — Europe
March 7, 2015	Zagreb	Croatia	Arena Zagreb	20,000+ sold out
March 14, 2015	Vienna	Austria	Pyramide Vösendorf	4,500
March 21, 2015	Tuzla	Bosnia and Herzegovina	Mejdan hall	6,000+ sold out
March 28, 2015	Helsingborg	Sweden	Sundspärlan	3,000
April 4, 2015	Stockholm	Sweden	Solnahallen	4,000 sold out
April 5, 2015	Gothenburg	Sweden	Restaurang Trädgårn	3,000 sold out
April 11, 2015	Uden	Netherlands	Evenementen Centrum	3,500
April 26, 2015	Lucerne	Switzerland	D'Lux The Club	2,000+
May 16, 2015	Oslo	Norway	Eventhallen	2,500 sold out
June 20, 2015	Mostar	Bosnia and Herzegovina	Stadion pod Bijelim Brijegom	8,000
July 12, 2015	Podgorica	Montenegro	Trg Svetog Petra Cetinjskog	10,000+
July 18, 2015	Vrnjačka Banja	Serbia	Stadion Kocka	6,000+ sold out
July 25, 2015	Opatija	Croatia	Ljetna Pozornica	5,000
August 1, 2015	Ohrid	Macedonia	Stadium Biljanini Izvori	15,000
August 2, 2015	Budva	Montenegro	Top Hill	5,000
August 27, 2015	Berovo	Macedonia	gradski trg	30,000+
September 6, 2015	Smederevo	Serbia	gradski trg	30,000+
September 12, 2015	Linz	Austria	TipsArena Linz	4,000
September 26, 2015	Niš	Serbia	Niš Fortress	10,000
October 10, 2015	Frankfurt	Germany	Union halle	1,500
October 16, 2015	Split	Croatia	Spaladium Arena	12,000 sold out
November 7, 2015	Zürich	Switzerland	Stadhalle Dietikon	3,500
November 28, 2015	Čakovec	Croatia	dvorana GOC-a	5,000 sold out
December 5, 2015	Toronto	Canada	Sound Academy	2,500 sold out
December 26, 2015	Novi Sad	Serbia	SPC Vojvodina	10,000+ sold out
December 31, 2015	Budva	Montenegro	gradski trg	25,000
January 30, 2016	Vranje	Serbia	open air	15,000
February 6, 2016	Dubrovnik	Croatia	Culture club Revelin	2,000
April 15, 2016	Maribor	Slovenia	Dvorana Tabor	5,000
July 18, 2016	Makarska	Croatia	Romana Beach Resort	3,000
August 20, 2016	Blace	Serbia	gradski trg	25,000
August 26, 2016	Zrenjanin	Serbia	gradski trg	50,000
September 18, 2016	Štip	Macedonia	gradski trg	50,000
September 24, 2016	Cetinje	Montenegro	gradski trg	20,000
September 30, 2016	Phoenix, Arizona	United States	El Zaribah Shrine	1,500 sold out
October 1, 2016	San Jose	United States	Tomba club	1,000
October 7, 2016	Chicago	United States	Hanging Gardens Banquets	2,000
October 8, 2016	New York City	United States	Melrose Ballroom	2,000 sold out
October 15, 2016	Zagreb	Croatia	City Centar One	15,000
December 2, 2016	Subotica	Serbia	Hala Sportova	5,000
December 10, 2016	Zürich	Switzerland	Stadhalle Dietikon	3,500
December 31, 2016	Novi Sad	Serbia	trg	50.000
March 4, 2017	Vienna	Austria	Pyramide Vosendorf	5,000
May 1, 2017	Zlatibor	Serbia	trg	15,000
May 11, 2017	Auckland	New Zealand	Sky city	1,000 sold out
May 13, 2017	Melbourne	Australia	Melbourne Festival Hall	4,000 sold out
May 19, 2017	Sydney	Australia	Darling Harbour theatre	2,000
May 20, 2017	Brisbane	Australia	Max Watts	1,000 sold out
June 30, 2017	Đurđevac	Croatia	utvrda stari grad	4,000
July 7, 2017	Končarevo	Serbia	stadium	10,000
July 21, 2017	Bajina Bašta	Serbia	regata	10,000
July 29, 2017	Medulin	Croatia	summer festival	7,000
August 6, 2017	Budva	Montenegro	Top Hill club	4,000
September 1, 2017	Požarevac	Serbia	fest	35,000
September 9, 2017	Budapest	Hungary	Akvarium club	2,000
October 7, 2017	Veles	Macedonia	fest	10,000
October 14, 2017	Split	Croatia	City Center One	5-10,000
December 31, 2017	Sarajevo	Bosnia and Hercegovina	trg	80,000
Total				892,000
