= Ambasadori =

Yugoslav schlager pop band (1968–1980)

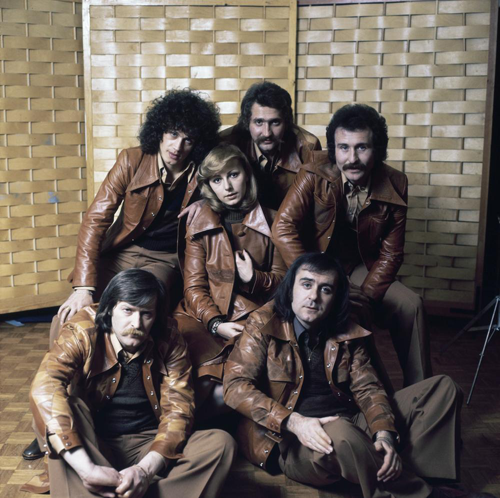
- Ambasadori in The Hague on 3 April 1976, the day of their Eurovision appearance

Background information
- Origin: Sarajevo, SR BiH, SFR Yugoslavia
- Genres: Schlager pop
- Years active: 1968–1980
- Labels: Beograd Disk, Diskoton
- Past members: Slobodan Vujović; Robert Ivanović; Srđan Stefanović; Zdravko Čolić; Hari Varešanović; Ivica Sindić; Krešimir Vlašić; Ismeta Dervoz-Krvavac; Perica Stojanović; Vlado Pravdić; Ivica Vinković; Zlatko Hold; Andrej Stefanović; Jasna Gospić; Miroslav Balta; Sead Džumhur; Miroslav Maraus; Sinan Alimanović; Neven Pocrnjić; Ranko Rihtman; Damir Jurišić; Darko Arkus; Slavko Jerković; Enes Bajramović; Hrvoje Tikvicki; Nenad Čikojević; Edo Bogeljić; Nazif Dinarević; Tihomir Doleček; Miroslav Šaranović; Sead Avdić; Dragan Nikačević; Velibor Čolović

Ambasadori (The Ambassadors) were a Yugoslav schlager pop band from Sarajevo, active from 1968 until 1980.

The band is most notable for their 1975 hit single "Zemljo moja", as well as for representing Yugoslavia at the Eurovision Song Contest 1976 with "Ne mogu skriti svoju bol"—both times with Ismeta Dervoz on vocals. They are further notable for the 1977 hit single "Dođi u pet do pet", this time with Jasna Gospić as the vocalist. Additionally, the band gained retroactive notability for having two of their lead singers—Zdravko Čolić (sang with the band from 1969 until 1971) and Hari Varešanović (from 1979 until 1980)—later go on to Yugoslav pop stardom in their respective solo careers.

== History ==
Ambasadori were founded in Sarajevo in 1968 by two military brass band musicians—keyboardist Robert Ivanović and trombonist Srđan Stefanović—both holding military rank as active officers of the Yugoslav People's Army (JNA). In fact, Ivanović had arrived in Sarajevo shortly prior via being reassigned (prekomanda) from a JNA unit in Belgrade. At the time of the band's launch, both Ivanović and Stefanović were additionally participating in the Sarajevo military orchestra.

They soon brought in guitarist Slobodan "Vuja" Vujović, a Fojnica-born and Sarajevo-raised hobbyist musician who had simultaneously been pursuing mechanical engineering studies at the University of Sarajevo. In-between his university obligations, Vujović often hung around Dom Milicije (Police House) that provided free on-site instruments for the musically-inclined youth, which is where Ivanović and Stefanović met him and got him to join their group.

Ambasadori obtained their first instruments and sound equipment by purchasing them from a travelling Bulgarian ensemble that had been performing at Sarajevo's Hotel Evropa. Still mostly a cover band at this stage, their repertoire centered around the 1960s rhythm & blues covers (Chicago, Otis Redding, Wilson Pickett, etc.) along with more covers of obligatory Yugoslav hits of the day and years past, and finally even a few original numbers written by the band members thrown into the mix.

Their very first performance took place in May 1969 in Sarajevo's Dom JNA (Yugoslav People's Army House) with local singer Miroslav Balta on vocals.

=== Zdravko Čolić years (1969–1971) ===
Soon after their debut performance, eighteen-year-old Zdravko Čolić joined Ambasadori as their new vocalist. Though he had already been singing with the local band Mladi i lijepi, the fresh high school graduate saw Ambasadori as more established, auditioning for them at Dom JNA by performing Wilson Pickett's "Deborah". Keyboardist Ivanović reportedly hired the teenager mid-song as soon as he completed the chorus line. Impressed with Čolić's vocal range, clean intonation, and the overall ease of singing, the band decided to immediately start looking for as many live performance opportunities as possible. With young Čolić on vocals, Vujović on guitar, Ivanović on keyboards, Ivica Sindičić on saxophone, Srđan Stefanović on trombone, Slobodan Jerković on bass guitar, Vlatko Anković on trumpet, and Tihomir Določek on drums, they gigged around town in Sarajevo—in clubs like Trasa, FIS, and Sloga as well as the odd appearance in recently opened Dom Mladih (Youth House), part of the newly-built Skenderija complex. Most of these appearances were booked and arranged through local music enthusiast and promoter Želimir "Čičak" Altarac who practically became the band's unofficial manager. Over time, the group started getting more gig offers, which presented a problem since band leaders Ivanović and Stefanović as well as saxophonist Sindičić and drummer Določek, all of whom were also JNA officers, weren't available for many of them due to their army obligations, and those offers had to be declined.

By 1970, seeing their business opportunities limited by the strange setup within the band and further discouraged by the band's founders Ivanović and Stefanović enrolling in the Sarajevo Music Academy that took up a lot of their time and focus, Vujović and Čolić decided to step out and form a new group, Novi Ambasadori (New Ambassadors), bringing in drummer Perica Stojanović, organist Vlado Pravdić, saxophonist Andrej "Lale" Stefanović, and bassist Zlatko Hold. With Vujović now firmly established as the band's driving force and main songwriter, they looked to forge a new career course. Almost immediately, Vujović's Novi Ambasadori dropped the 'Novi' part, continuing on as just Ambasadori since the original band's founders Ivanović and Stefanović quickly gave up on protecting the name.

With an almost all new lineup, Ambasadori also expanded their repertoire so that in addition to R&B they now also began playing covers of Led Zeppelin, Blood, Sweat & Tears, Creedence Clearwater Revival, etc. In the summer of 1970, Ambasadori scored a month-long gig with Indexi in Dubrovnik, their first tour-like experience and a taste of life on the road.

The band appeared at the 1971 Vaš šlager sezone annual schlager competition in Sarajevo where they finished in 7th place with "Plačem za tvojim usnama", a song that songwriter Zdenko Runjić claimed to have composed and officially signed his name under despite it being a blatant rip-off of The Tremeloes' "Suddenly You Love Me" (itself a cover of Riccardo Del Turco's "Uno tranquillo"). No one from the festival noticed the plagiarism and the band avoided controversy. The song would become the band's debut release—seven-inch (two-side) single "Plačem za tvojim usnama / Zapjevaj" released in 1971 by Beograd Disk label. The Vaš šlager sezone performance was further significant since it marked the band's first television appearance, exposing them to a much larger audience. One of the people in that TV audience was Kornelije Kovač, an already influential and established figure in Yugoslav music circles—former member of Indexi now fronting his own supergroup, Korni Grupa—who took note of young Čolić's "clean tenor and good stage presence"

During summer 1971, Kovač met up with Čolić by showing up at an Ambasadori gig in Mostar. He quickly managed to convince the young singer to move to Belgrade and join his Korni Grupa as replacement for Dado Topić.

=== Ismeta Dervoz years (1972–1976) ===
After Čolić left, eighteen-year-old Ismeta Dervoz became the new Ambasadori vocalist. Dervoz's only previous musical engagement of note had been singing for cover band Kodeksi.

Dervoz's first live appearance with Ambasadori came at the 1972 Skopje Festival where they performed the Kemal Monteno-written-and-composed song "Sviraj mi, sviraj". The same year, Jugoton released their 7-inch single "Posljednja serenada / Idila jednog mačka / Hej, vi" with Dervoz on vocals on each of the three tracks.

In 1973, in line with SFR Yugoslavia's new policy of decentralization, Diskoton music label was established in Sarajevo with Ambasadori bandleader Vujović appointed as its top executive.

During fall 1973, Ambasadori went on a tour of the Soviet Union.

In early 1974, twenty-six-year-old Diskoton chief executive Vujović rejected a fledgling local band called Bijelo Dugme, a move that would go down in Yugoslav popular music history as an example of a bad judgement call after they signed a long-term deal with rival label Jugoton and immediately went on to nationwide fame with millions of records sold.

In 1975, Ambasadori scored a sizable hit with their entry at the Vaš šlager sezone festival—Kemal Monteno-written patriotic schlager song "Zemljo moja", inspired by and dedicated to Yugoslav gastarbeiters leaving their homeland in search of expanded employment opportunities throughout Western Europe. Finishing fourth among the sixteen competitors, they additionally won the festival's interpretation award while the main prize went to Zdravko Čolić, their former singer who had recently gone solo, and his song "Zvao sam je Emili".

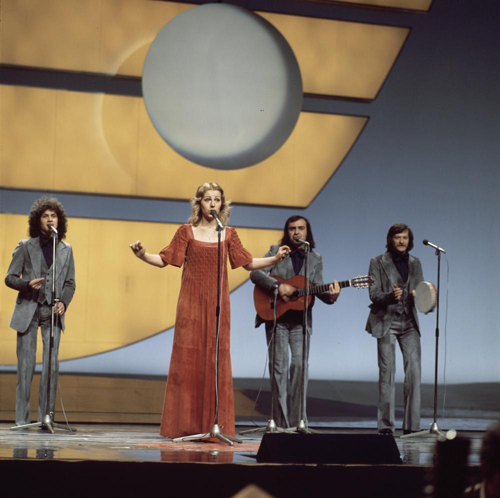
Ambasadori rehearsing at Nederlands Congresgebouw in The Hague ahead of their 1976 Eurovision performance.

Ambasadori represented SFR Yugoslavia at the Eurovision Song Contest 1976 in The Hague with song "Ne mogu skriti svoju bol" (written by Slobodan Đurasović and composed by Vujović), finishing second last among the 18 participating countries. Their disappointing finish caused a lot of negative reaction in the country and precipitated its 5-year withdrawal from the competition.

Fresh off their Eurovision disappointment, Ambasadori returned to the Vaš šlager sezone where they had had so much success a year earlier. This time performing Marina Tucaković-written and Nenad Pavlović-composed "Usne imam da ga ljubim", the song didn't get much attention at the festival, finishing seventh out of sixteen participants as the main prize went to Kemal Monteno and his Alija Hafizović-written love letter to the city of Sarajevo — "Sarajevo, ljubavi moja". Yugoslav press also reported ironic heckles of "Bravo Hag" ('Good job at the Hague') during Ambasadori performance as the poor Eurovision showing continued lingering over them.

Soon after the 1976 Vaš šlager sezone appearance, Dervoz left the band. She was eventually replaced with sixteen-year-old Jasna Gospić.

=== Jasna Gospić years (1977–1979) ===
By bringing in teenage Gospić, whose only prior musical experience had been signing in a band called Plima with her brother Zoran, Ambasadori leader Vujović continued the practice of acquiring young and inexperienced vocalists. Still a high school student at Sarajevo's Second Gymnasium, Gospić's first appearance with Ambasadori took place at the 1977 Vaš šlager sezone with "Dođi u pet do pet". Composed by Vujović with lyrics by Slobodan Đurasović, the cheeky song turned out to be an unexpected Yugoslavia-wide hit despite failing to get much attention from the festival jury that awarded the top prize to Indexi's "U jednim plavim očima".

Riding the unanticipated popularity of "Dođi u pet do pet", the band began touring a lot more throughout the country while also continuing to appear at various schlager festivals. However, the age gap between the band members and their teenage vocalist soon began causing issues. Gospić herself talked about it in later interviews, describing the strange dynamic between the band members — all of whom were married with wives and families — who saw the band as a job and their teenage vocalist, half their age, who was mostly concerned with hanging out with friends.

Other Ambasadori members that came and went throughout the 1968–1970s include various musicians active on the Sarajevo music scene at the time and after, such as trombone player Srđan Stefanović, keyboard player Robert Ivanović, keyboard player Sinan Alimanovic, keyboard player Neven Pocrnjić, saxophone player Ivica Sindic, drummer "Tica", trumpet player Krešimir "Keco" Vlašić (ex Pro Arte), singer Ismeta Dervoz (ex Kodeksi), drummer Perica Stojanović (ex Jutro), organist Vlado Pravdić, bassist Ivica Vinković, bassist Zlatko Hold, saxophonist Andrej "Lale" Stefanović, etc.

Preceded by Pepel in Kri	Yugoslavia in the Eurovision Song Contest; 1976	Succeeded by Vajta
