= Da ti kažem šta mi je =

Studio album by Zdravko Čolić
- Released: 1990.
- Studio: Laza Ristovski's Studio, Belgrade
- Genre: pop, disco, funk
- Label: Komuna / Kamarad
- Producer: Goran Bregović

Zdravko Čolić chronology
Zdravko Čolić (1988)	Da ti kažem šta mi je (1990)	Kad bi moja bila (1997)

Da ti kažem šta mi je is the eight studio album by Zdravko Čolić, released in 1990.

== Track listing ==
1. Čija je ono zvijezda (Whose Star Is That)
2. Maslinasto zelena (Olive Green)
3. E, draga, draga (Hey, Darling, Darling)
4. Rijeka suza i na njoj lađa (A River Of Tears And A Ship On It)
5. Spavaju li oči nebeske (Are The Heavenly Eyes Asleep)
6. Čaje šukarije
7. Mastilo i voda (Ink And Water)
8. Negdje na dnu srca (Somewhere At The Bottom Of The Heart)
9. Da ti kažem šta mi je (To Tell You What's Wrong With Me)

== Sound-alike ==
- The Parni Valjak's 1993 song "Sve još miriše na nju" uses the same chorus melody as in Zdravko Čolić's 1990 song "Rijeka suza i na njoj lađa".
