= Sabahudin Kurt =

Bosnian folk and pop singer (1935–2018)

- Born: 18 July 1935; Sarajevo, Drina Banovina, Kingdom of Yugoslavia
- Died: 30 March 2018 (aged 82); Sarajevo, Bosnia and Herzegovina
- Occupation: Singer
- Years active: 1954–2007
- Spouse: Ismeta (m. 1966-2018; his death)
- Children: 2
- Musical career
- Genres: Pop; folk; sevdalinka
- Instrument: Vocals
- Labels: Jugoton; Beograd Disk; Diskoton

Sabahudin Kurt (18 July 1935 – 30 March 2018) was a Bosnian folk and pop singer. Kurt represented Yugoslavia in Copenhagen in the Eurovision Song Contest 1964 with the entry "Život je sklopio krug" (English: "Life Has Come Full Circle"). He finished in thirteenth place, scoring 0 points.

Kurt recorded his first song, "Dim u tvojim očima" ("Smoke in Your Eyes") in 1954.

== Personal life ==
Kurt was born in Sarajevo, Bosnia and Herzegovina, an only child.

He had been married to Ismeta since 1966; the couple had two sons, Damir and Almir.

Kurt was among the guests honoring Serbian composer Kornelije Kovač on 25 November 2012 for the 50th anniversary of Kovač's professional career.

== Later life ==
After suffering a heart attack and having triple-bypass surgery in 2007, Kurt retired from music and decided to live out the rest of his life in the Bosnian countryside. He moved to upper Vlakovo village in the Ilidža suburb of Sarajevo.

He was again hospitalized 29 August 2014 due to "cardiovascular problems". Kurt died 30 March 2018 of undisclosed causes at age 82.

== Discography ==
=== Extended plays and singles ===
- Dim u tvojim očima (1954)
- Pjesma Sarajevu / Hvalisavi Mornar (1963)
- Mala Sarajka / Sarajevske noći (1963)
- Vaš Šlager Sezone '70 with Hamdija Čustović (1970)
- Oj sevdahu što si težak ("Ilidža") (1972)
- Temerav, Temerav (1974)

=== Compilation albums ===
- Zlatni jubilej (2004)
