= Jasna Gospić =

Bosnian singer

- Born: 1961 (age 64–65); Sarajevo, SR Bosnia and Herzegovina, Yugoslavia
- Origin: Bosnia and Herzegovina
- Genres: Pop
- Occupation: Singer
- Instrument: Vocals
- Years active: 1970s–present
- Formerly of: Ambasadori
- Spouse: Dejan Sparavalo

Jasna Gospić (born 1961, Sarajevo) is a Bosnian singer.

== Career ==
Her singing career began at the age of 16 in the band Plima, founded by Jasna's brother Zoran Gospić. She continued her career as a third vocalist in the band Ambasadori – the Bosnian pop-rock band in which once sang famous artists such as Zdravko Čolić, Ismeta Dervoz and Hajrudin Varešanović.

In a short period of musical collaborations were created extraordinary achievements, in particular evergreen stands out "Dođi u pet do pet" (Meet me at five to five).

Her numerous appearances on national pop music festivals throughout the former Yugoslavia, mainly during the 1980s, when she performed at the Split Festival, Sarajevo hit of the season, Zagrebfest and the festival in Opatija, as well as in national elections for the Eurovision Song Contest, are just some of her achievements. Also she won the Estradne nagrade Jugoslavije and many other awards.

In cooperation with the most famous local authors she has published four albums and several singles, of which the audience remembers the hits Zar je voljeti grijeh? (Is it a sin to love?) and A još mi ne daš mira (And yet you do not give me peace.)

== Personal ==
Gospić is married to Dejan Sparavalo. The couple has two children and resides in Prague where Gospić works as a representative of a number of international fashion companies such as Roberto Cavalli, Tara Jarmon and Sergio Tacchini. She advocates for women's issues in society and is an honorary member of the Association Žene ženama (Women to Women).
