= Kad bi moja bila =

Studio album by Zdravko Čolić
- Released: 1997.
- Recorded: 1997
- Studio: Studio Kamarad, Belgrade
- Genre: pop-folk, pop
- Length: ??:??
- Label: Komuna
- Producer: Goran Bregović

Zdravko Čolić chronology
Da ti kažem šta mi je (1990)	Kad bi moja bila (1997)	Okano (2000)

Kad bi moja bila is the ninth studio album by Zdravko Čolić, released in 1997. It was Čolić's first album after seven years of voluntary absence from the scene, mainly because of the ongoing wars in the former Yugoslavia.

It marks a significant change in Čolić's music style, with Goran Bregović as producer bringing it closer to a pop-folk sound; contrary to the straight pop which had been Čolić's trademark from the beginning of his career. This trend continued onto his following albums.

== Track listing ==
1. Kad bi moja bila (If You Were Mine)
2. Ajde, ajde Jasmina (Come On, Come On, Jasmina)
3. Trinaest dana (Thirteen Days)
4. Čini mi se grmi (It seems to me it's thundering)
5. Melanholija (Melancholy)
6. Jako, jako slabo srce zavodiš (You're very, very [much] seducing a weak heart)
7. Samo kad mi kažeš ljubav (Only When You Say Love To Me)
8. I šta tebe briga šta ja radim (And What Do You Care About What I'm Doing)
9. Tabakera (Cigarette Case)
10. Majsko sunce (May's Sun)
