= Zbog tebe (Zdravko Čolić album) =

Studio album by Zdravko Čolić
- Released: 1980.
- Recorded: December 1979
- Studio: Centar Sound Studio, London; Central Recorders Ltd, London
- Genre: pop, disco, pop-rock
- Label: Jugoton
- Producer: Kornelije Kovač

Zdravko Čolić chronology
Ako priđeš bliže (1977)	Zbog tebe (1980)	Malo pojačaj radio (1981)

Zbog tebe (Because of You) is the third studio album by Zdravko Čolić released in 1980.

The authors on the record are Goran Bregović, Kemal Monteno, Arsen Dedić, and Spomenka Kovač.

== Track listing ==
1. "Pisaću joj pisma duga" (I'll Write Her Long Letters) (K. Kovač – G. Bregović – K. Kovač)
2. "Zbog tebe" (Because Of You) (Đ. Balašević – Đ. Balašević – G. Bregović)
3. "Smijem se bez smisla" (I Laugh Without Sense) (K. Kovač – S. Kovač – K. Kovač)
4. "Bar jedan ples" (At Least One Dance) (G. Bregović)
5. "Odvešću te" (I'll Take You Away) (A. Dedić – A. Dedić – K. Kovač)
6. "Pusti, pusti modu" (Forget About Fashion) (S. Vujović – G. Bregović – K. Kovač)
7. "Pjevaću za svoju dušu, (živjeću za prave stvari) (I'll Sing For Myself, I'll Live For Real Things) (K. Kovač)
8. "Prava stvar" (The Real Thing) (K. Monteno – A. Dedić – G. Bregović)
9. "Srce je čudna zvijerka" (Heart Is a Strange Animal) (K. Kovač – D. Trifunović – K. Kovač)
10. "Pjesmo moja" (Oh, Song of Mine) (K. Kovač – J. Jovanović Zmaj – K. Kovač )
11. "Stari moj" (My Old Man) (K. Kovač-G. Bregović – K. Kovač i G. Bregović)
