= Ono malo sreće =

Studio album by Zdravko Čolić
- Released: 2017.
- Genre: pop
- Label: PGP-RTS; Croatia Records

Zdravko Čolić chronology
Vatra i barut (2013)	Ono malo sreće (2017)

Ono malo sreće (Little bit of happiness) is the fifteenth album by Zdravko Čolić. It was released on 2017 by PGP RTS and Croatia Records.

The biggest hits from this album include the title track, Mala, Šljive su rodile, and Kuća puna naroda.

== Background ==
After the release of the album Vatra i barut, Čolić held a successful tour of the same name in Serbia, former SFRY region and abroad.

== Album ==
The album was recorded in the studios "NB" in Zagreb and "RSL" in Novo Mesto under the production of Nikša Bratoš. The album was mixed in the studio "Sono records" in Prague, while the mastering was done in London.

The album contains 11 selected songs signed by Čolić by important regional authors Momčilo Bajagić Bajaga, Gibonni, Zlatan Fazlić, Antonija Šola, Sandra Sagena, Aleksandar Sretenović, Damir Arslanagić, Maya Sar and Miroslav Drljača Rus.

== Charts ==
=== Weekly ===
List	Peak position
HR Top 40	1

=== Semi-annual ===
List	Peak position
HDU	3
