= Kad pogledaš me preko ramena =

Studio album by Zdravko Čolić
- Released: 2010.
- Studio: Studio Go Go, Belgrade; Studio Barba, Belgrade; NB Studio, Zagreb
- Genre: pop, pop-folk
- Label: mt:s
- Producer: Vojislav Aralica; Nikša Bratoš

Zdravko Čolić chronology
Zavičaj (2006)	Kad pogledaš me preko ramena (2010)

Kad pogledaš me preko ramena (When you look at me over the shoulder) is the thirteenth studio album by Zdravko Čolić, released in 2010. It was released after a 4-year pause, when in 2006 the album "Zavičaj" (Homeland) was released. The songs were recorded and performed in 2009, while the recording was set in Belgrade, Zagreb, Novo Mesto and London. The album was produced by Vojislav Aralica and Nikša Bratoš and the executive producer was Adis Gojak.

The album contains 13 songs, including a single "Manijači" (Maniacs) duet that Čolić made with Goran Bregović, which is also the first single off the album. Among the other songs which stand out are ballad "Pamuk" (Cotton) and "Ljubavnici" (Lovers), the song "Lili", which was written in German by Nikola Čuturilo, "Dajte nam svega" (Give us all) and the title song "Kad pogledaš me preko ramena". The album sold more than 700,000 copies.

== Pjesme ==
1. "Kad pogledaš me preko ramena" (When you look at me over the shoulder) – 3:42
2. "Manijači" (Maniacs) – 3:52
3. "Autoput" (Highway)– 4:27
4. "Pamuk" (Cotton)– 5:28
5. "Dajte nam svega" (Give us all)– 3:30
6. "Lili" – 4:06
7. "Javi se, javi se" (Pick up, pick up)– 4:04
8. "Pričaj mi brate" (Tell me brother)– 4:30
9. "Obmana" (Deception)– 4:14
10. "Meni niko ne treba" (I don't need anyone)– 3:55
11. "Ljubavnici" (Lovers)– 5:00
12. "Prolaze neke slike" (Passing pictures)– 4:13
13. "Poplava" (Flood)– 4:03
