= Zdravko Čolić =

Bosnian singer (born 1951)

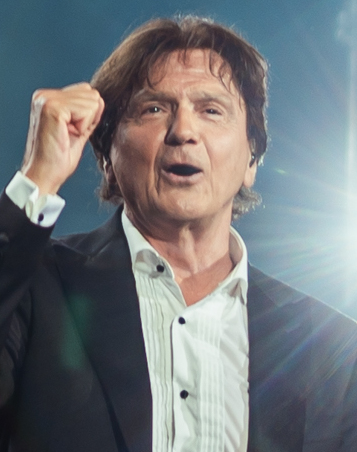
- Čolić in 2024
- Born: 30 May 1951 (age 75); Sarajevo, PR Bosnia and Herzegovina, FPR Yugoslavia
- Other names: Čola; Dravco
- Education: Sarajevo School of Economics and Business (BEc)
- Occupations: Singer; songwriter
- Years active: 1967–present
- Spouse: Aleksandra Aleksić (m. 2001)
- Children: 2
- Musical career
- Genres: Pop; pop-folk; disco; rock
- Instruments: Vocals; guitar
- Labels: Beograd Disk; Jugoton; PGP-RTB; Warner Bros.; Suzy; Atlantic; Diskoton; Komuna; PGP-RTS; BK; City
- Formerly of: Mladi i lijepi; Ambasadori; Korni Grupa
- Award

Zdravko Čolić (Serbian Cyrillic: Здравко Чолић, pronounced [zdrǎːv̞.kɔ̝ t͡ʃɔ̝̌ː.lit͡ɕ]; born 30 May 1951) is a Bosnian pop singer who is widely considered one of the greatest vocalists and cultural icons of the former Yugoslavia. He has been compared to Paul McCartney and Tom Jones by music critics and the general public. He has garnered fame in Southeastern Europe for his emotionally expressive tenor voice, fluent stage presence and numerous critically and commercially acclaimed albums and singles.

Among his songs, "Ti si mi u krvi" (You're In My Blood), from the eponymous album, is widely considered one of the most popular ballads of ex-Yugoslav music.

== Early life ==
Born in Sarajevo, PR Bosnia and Herzegovina, FPR Yugoslavia to Bosnian Serb parents, police administrator Vladimir Čolić from the Vlahovići village near Ljubinje (Herzegovina) and homemaker Stana Čolić from Trebinje (East Herzegovina), Čolić grew up with a younger brother Dragan. Showing an early interest in sports, the youngster was active as a football goalkeeper in FK Željezničar's youth system, before switching to track and field where he also excelled in the 100 metres and long jump. At one point he ran a 100-meter dash in 11.3 seconds, and continually placed high at various events he entered (finishing just behind future star Nenad Stekić at one of them). Čolić eventually gave up on a career in sports, feeling he lacked the discipline required to compete regularly.

Growing up in Sarajevo, Čolić attended the Vladimir Perić Valter elementary school in the Skenderija neighborhood near the adjacent neighborhood of Grbavica where he lived. He also attended music school, studying guitar playing. As a hobby, he took part in various school recitals and also acted in a couple of plays at the Pionirsko pozorište (youth theatre).

== Early career ==
=== Early years ===
From a very young age, Čolić showed an interest in music. With friend Braco Isović, he played guitar at informal and impromptu park gatherings around their neighborhood through which they became known locally as 'Čola i Isa sa Grbavice'. At the time, Čolić was trying to emulate pop schlager music that dominated Yugoslav and Italian festivals. His first love was Milena Mijatović from Belgrade.

His first significant public singing experience occurred in 1967 while at the Montenegrin coast for the Yugoslav Republic Day celebrations. Staying in the wooden prefab vacation home his family owned in the coastal community of Baošići, seventeen-year-old Čolić was persuaded by a friend, Nedim Idrizović, to enter an amateur singing competition in nearby Bijela. The teenager won second prize singing "Lady Madonna" by The Beatles.

Encouraged by the unexpected success, soon after returning to Sarajevo, Čolić entered his first band—a group called 'Mladi i lijepi'. This participation lasted until he graduated high school in 1969 when he decided to move on to the more established Ambasadori, a band whose two incarnations Čolić would end up staying with for the next two and a half years.

=== Ambasadori ===
When Čolić joined them, Ambasadori employed an unusual setup: being essentially a military cover band as all the musicians, except for bandleader Slobodan Vujović, were Yugoslav People's Army (JNA) ranked officers. Their repertoire centered around the 1960s rhythm & blues (Chicago, Otis Redding, Wilson Pickett, etc.) along with obligatory Yugoslav hits of the day and years past, and finally even a few original numbers written by the bandmembers thrown into the mix. Over time, the group started getting more gig offers, which presented a problem since its army part was not available for many of them, and those offers had to be declined.

Seeing their opportunities limited by the strange situation, Vujović and Čolić decided to step out and form Novi ambasadori in 1970, bringing in drummer Perica Stojanović, organist Vlado Pravdić, saxophonist Lale Stefanović, and bassist Zlatko Hold. With the almost all-new lineup, the band also expanded its repertoire so that in addition to R&B they now also played covers of Led Zeppelin, Blood, Sweat & Tears, Creedence Clearwater Revival, and others. In the summer of 1970, Novi ambasadori scored a month-long gig with Indexi in Dubrovnik, which was their first tour-like experience.

Next step was competing at the 1971 Vaš šlager sezone annual festival in Sarajevo where they finished in 7th place with a song "Plačem za tvojim usnama" that songwriter Zdenko Runjić claimed to have composed and officially signed his name under, even though it was a blatant rip-off of The Tremeloes' "Suddenly You Love Me" (which is a cover of Riccardo Del Turco's "Uno tranquillo" ). No one from the festival noticed this plagiarism and the band avoided the controversy. The song was even released on a 7-inch single "Plačem za tvojim usnama" / "Zapjevaj" by Beograd Disk and sold surprisingly well. The performance at Vaš šlager sezone was also significant since it marked the band's first television appearance, exposing them to a much larger audience. One of the people in that TV audience was Kornelije Kovač, an already influential and established figure in Yugoslav music circles, who immediately was intrigued by Čolić's "clean tenor and good stage presence".

Čolić was soon offered a "bench role" with Indexi, to fill in for their singer Davorin Popović, and even performed with them a couple of times.

=== Korni grupa ===
In the meantime, during the summer of 1971, Čolić finally met face to face with Kornelije Kovač who came to see Čolić play in Mostar and invited him to join his band Korni Grupa as a replacement to their departed singer Dado Topić.

On 10 September 1971, twenty-year-old Čolić left his hometown and moved to the capital Belgrade to join his new band. However, his stint with Korni grupa ultimately proved to be very short and largely unsuccessful as he never meshed well enough with the rest of the group musically, finding it hard to fit into their progressive rock style. He recorded three tracks with them, "Kukavica, "Gospa Mica gazdarica", and "Pogledaj u nebo", all of which were released on the 7-inch single by PGP-RTB. Track "Gospa Mica gazdarica" managed to create minor controversy due to the slightly risque lyrics written from the perspective of a young man imploring his older female landlord to allow him into her bed—a nod to Čolić's life at the time since he was living away from home in sublet apartments. Due to numerous complaints, the song was taken off radio playlists.

Soon, however, Čolić and Kovač agreed that it would be better for Čolić to go solo. Only six months after his arrival to Belgrade, he returned to Sarajevo determined to give his solo career a try.

== Solo career ==
=== Early activity: Schlager festivals ===
On 15 April 1972 Čolić's first solo move was taking part in the Vaš šlager sezone competitive festival in Sarajevo. He won the third audience prize as well as the interpretation award with Kemal Monteno written song "Sinoć nisi bila tu" that was originally meant to be sung by Josipa Lisac who opted out at the last moment.

Right away, under Kovač's guidance Čolić managed to establish a fair amount of prominence as a solo act—and on 20 May 1972 the two appeared as guests on the very popular TV Belgrade variety show Obraz uz obraz hosted by Milena Dravić and Dragan Nikolić. The same year, Čolić made further appearances at the Split Festival (with song "Stara pjesma"), Priština festival, and Skopje Festival (with song "Moj bol"), before embarking on a tour of Soviet Union together with Indexi, Bisera Veletanlić, Sabahudin Kurt, and Sabina Varešanović.

=== Eurovision and more festivals ===
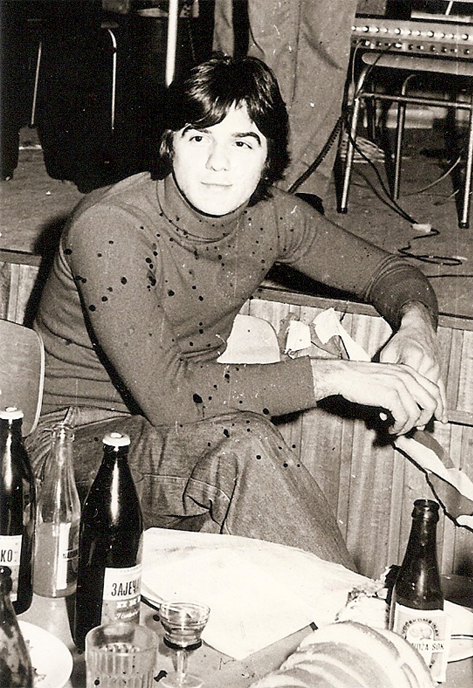
Čolić in Požarevac, 1973

Then came the first big break that launched him on the road to stardom. By winning at the Opatija festival with the song "Gori vatra" written by Kemal Monteno, Čolić got to represent Yugoslavia at the Eurovision Song Contest 1973 on 7 April 1973 in Luxembourg City. The song placed poorly but became a well-respected hit at home.

Riding the wave of exposure the Eurovision appearance afforded him, Čolić continued entering competitive festivals throughout SFR Yugoslavia over the next two years with plenty of success. At Hit parada festival in Belgrade on 23 November 1974, he won with the song "Ona spava", composed and written by Kornelije Kovač. The following year, Čolić bagged a few more festival wins with Kovač's songs—Beogradsko proleće with "April u Beogradu", and Vaš šlager sezone with "Zvao sam je Emili". Other songs he performed at various festivals in those years were "Bling blinge blinge bling" (1973 Vaš šlager sezone, composed by Zdenko Runjić), "Ljubav je samo riječ" (1974 Beogradsko proleće, composed by Vojkan Borisavljević), and "Zelena si rijeka bila" (1974 Vaš šlager sezone, composed by Kemal Monteno).

Around the same time, he also signed a deal with the German arm of WEA record label and did two singles for that market. German producers thought that his name was too difficult to pronounce for their consumers so they marketed him as Dravco. Soon, however, Čolić decided not to pursue his options there given the lack of enthusiasm for his music there.

=== Debut album ===
His first solo album was Ti i ja (You and I), released in 1975 by Jugoton. Closely overseen by Kornelije Kovač, the album brought Čolić more hits like "Vagabund", "Igraš se vatrom", and "Loše vino" (written by Arsen Dedić and Goran Bregović). Cover sleeve was done by Dragan S. Stefanović, another collaborator who would remain with Čolić for years to come. Čolić's image especially appealed to girls and women, something that would remain a staple of his entire career. The same year, cashing in on his sudden popularity upswing, PGP RTB released a compilation of his festival singles under the name Zdravko Čolić.

Despite, achieving great prominence already, Čolić continued appearing at the occasional festival such as the Zagreb one in 1976 where he surprisingly finished in fourth place singing "Ti si bila, uvijek bila". At the end of that year, he went on a Yugoslavia-wide tour with Indexi. After the Belgrade concert, the measure of his sudden fame was on public display during autograph-signing at the Jugoton store as the cordon of girls rushed the store, breaking a window glass in an attempt to get closer to him.

The next year, 1977, he did the festival circuit for the last time, first in Zagreb with "Živiš u oblacima", followed by an appearance at the Festival of Patriotic Songs also in Zagreb, where he performed Druže Tito mi ti se kunemo. That song was soon released on a 7-inch single record and sold 300,000 copies.

=== Mass popularity ===
His second album, Ako priđeš bliže (If You Come Closer), released later that year, was even more successful, creating mass hysteria among girls for his music. The copies were extremely sought-after, as 50,000 sold in the first two weeks alone. The album contained some of his best-known and liked songs such as "Glavo luda", "Zagrli me", "Juče još", "Pjevam danju, pjevam noću", "Jedna zima sa Kristinom", and "Produži dalje".

On 1 April 1978, he started an ambitious tour of SFR Yugoslavia with Lokice Dance Group in support of the album that had already sold 150,000 copies. Čolić also started to play the guitar occasionally on stage. Putujući zemljotres (Traveling Earthquake Tour) produced and organized by Maksa Ćatović moved all over the country, soon becoming a phenomenon the likes of which the country had not seen before. The scenes of screaming girls rushing the stage were repeated in city after city. The tour's climax took place in Belgrade at Red Star FC stadium on 5 September 1978 with 70,000 people in attendance even though Čolić already played two sold-out shows in Belgrade a few months earlier on 4 and 8 April at Hala Pionir. Supporting Čolić on stage that night were Chris Nicholls on keyboards and Dado Topić on bass guitar, with old favorites Kornelije Kovač, Arsen Dedić, Kemal Monteno, Josip Boček, Trio Strune, and RTV Belgrade singing quintet appearing as guests. Čolić and the great tour essentially became a cultural phenomenon transcending musical boundaries such that in the lead-up to the big Belgrade concert journalist Dušan Savković and film director Jovan Ristić decided to make a movie about Čolić. Savković wrote a rudimentary screenplay, but the movie ended up being a 90-minute feature documentary titled Pjevam danju, pjevam noću (trans. "I sing during the day, I sing at night") that follows Čolić from the Belgrade concert onwards and looks back on his career up to that point. Two days after the Belgrade concert, Čolić was in his hometown Sarajevo at Koševo Stadium for the tour's grand finale; however, the rain interrupted much of the concert. By the end of its promotion cycle, the album sold more than 700,000 copies and with later re-releases during the 1990s went over the million mark.

Čolić also got the attention of Ziggy Loch, director of German WEA, who immediately after watching the Belgrade concert wanted to renew his contract. Singles with songs "Jedina" and "Zagrli me" were released for the German market as well as the disco single "I'm Not a Robot Man" / "Light Me". However, Čolić refused to move to Germany for the second time, and instead on 14 November 1978 went to serve his mandatory Yugoslav Army stint. Twenty-seven years of age at the time, Čolić was assigned to a unit in Valjevo, before getting transferred to Belgrade, and finally Požarevac. After serving 10 months, he got out of the military service on 14 September 1979.

=== 1980s ===
Upon his return from the army, Čolić started work on his third album—which came out in the spring of 1980, entitled Zbog tebe; it brought more hits as Čola further secured his position of the most popular pop performer in Yugoslavia.

In 1984, Čolić moved from his hometown Sarajevo to Ljubljana where he started a private business with Goran Bregović through their Kamarad label. He then lived in Zagreb for five years. 1988 saw his hit "Jastreb". In 1989, he moved back to Belgrade.

=== Comeback ===
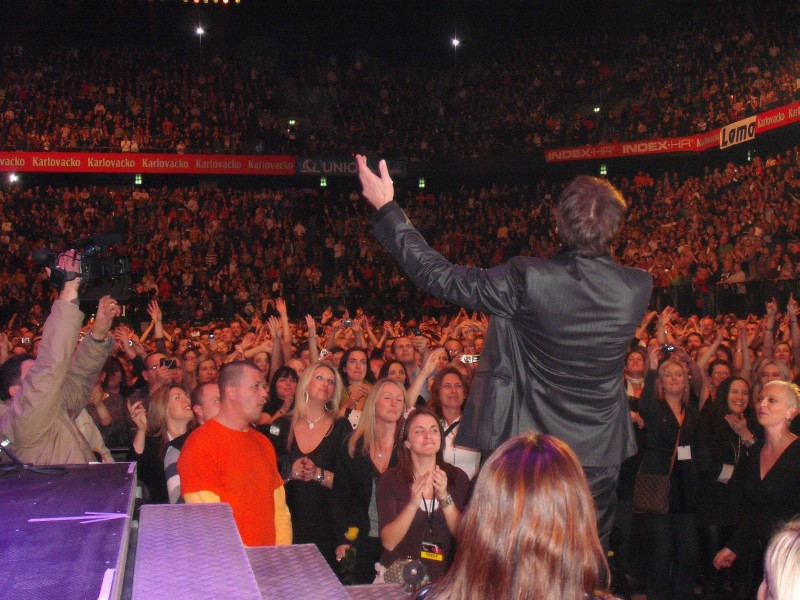
Čolić performing at Spaladium Arena in Split, Croatia, February 2010

After his 1990 album "Da ti kažem šta mi je", Čolić didn't make another album until late 1997, when he embarked on a comeback with Komuna label album Kad bi moja bila, and regained much of his popularity. The following year, he had nine sold-out concerts at Sava Centar.

In October 2005, Čolić performed two concerts at the Belgrade Arena.

Čolić voiced Shelby Forthright (originally played by Fred Willard) in the Bosnian dub of the acclaimed 2008 Pixar release WALL-E.

In 2010, he had a big concert on the Asim Ferhatović Hase Stadium in Sarajevo, during his Kad pogledaš me preko ramena tour, in front of over 60,000 people. On 25 June 2011, he had the biggest concert of his career: on Ušće, in Belgrade, with over 100,000 visitors. His biggest concert to date celebrated his 40-year career milestone.

== Personal life ==
At the outbreak of the Bosnian War, Čolić moved to Belgrade, and has lived there ever since. He graduated from the School of Economics and Business at the University of Sarajevo. He is married to Aleksandra Aleksić and has two daughters.

== Discography ==
=== Studio albums ===
- Ti i ja (You and Me) (1975)
- Ako priđeš bliže (If You Come Closer) (1977)
- Zbog tebe (Because of You) (1980)
- Malo pojačaj radio (Turn Up the Radio a Bit) (1981)
- Šta mi radiš (What Are You Doing to Me?) (1983)
- Ti si mi u krvi (You Are in My Blood) (1984)
- Rodi me majko, sretnog (Birthed Me as a Lucky Man, Mother) (1988)
- Da ti kažem šta mi je (To Tell You What's Up with Me) (1990)
- Kad bi moja bila (If You Were Mine) (1997)
- Okano (2000)
- Čarolija (Enchantment) (2003)
- Zavičaj (Homeland) (2006)
- Kad pogledaš me preko ramena (When You Look At Me Over the Shoulder) (2010)
- Vatra i barut (Fire and Gunpowder) (2013)
- Ono malo sreće (That Bit of Luck) (2017)
- Maštam i praštam (I Dream and Forgive) (2026)

=== Singles ===
- "Sinoć nisi bila tu" / "Tako tiho" (1972)
- "Stara pisma" / "Pod lumbrelon" (1972)
- "Gori vatra" / "Isti put" (1973)
- "Bling, blinge, blinge, bling" / "Julija" (1973)
- "Dome moj" / "Ljubav je samo riječ" (1974)
- "Ona spava" / "Zaboravi sva proljeća" (1974)
- "Zelena si rijeka bila" / "Ne dam ti svoju ljubav" (1974)
- "Madre Mia" / "Rock n roll himmel" (1974)
- "Zvao sam je Emili" / "Sonata" (1975)
- "April u Beogradu" / "Svitanje" (1975)
- "Alles was ich hab" / "Lampenfieber" (1975)
- "Ti si bila, uvijek bila" / "A sad sam ja na redu" (1976)
- "Ljubav ima lažni sjaj" / "Balerina" (1977)
- "Živiš u oblacima" / "Zašto spavaš" (1977)
- "Light me" / "I'm not a robot man" (1978)
- "Loš glas" / "Ne mogu biti tvoj" (1978)
- "Druže Tito, mi ti se kunemo" / "Titovim putem" (1980)

=== Live albums ===
- Stadium Marakana (2001) /Live, 2xDVD/
- Belgrade Arena (2005) /Live, 2xDVD/
- Stadium Marakana (2007) /Live, 2xDVD/
- Stadium Koševo (2010) /Live, 2xDVD/
- Belgrade Ušće (2011) /Live, 2xDVD/

=== Compilations ===
- Pjesme koje volimo (The Songs We Like) (1984)
- Poslednji i prvi (The First And the Last) (1994)
- Zauvek (Forever) (1998)
- Zauvek 2 (Forever 2) (1999)
- 7X Čola Box Set (2000)
- Balade (The Ballads) (2002)
- The Best of Zdravko Čolić (double-CD set) (2004)
- The Best of Zdravko Čolić (2008)

== Tours ==
- Okano Tour (2001–02)
- Zavičaj Tour (2006–09)
- Kad pogledaš me preko ramena Tour (2010–13)
- Vatra i barut Tour (2014–17)
- Ono malo sreće Tour (2018–19)

== Note ==
1. Zdravko Čolić was born in Sarajevo, PR Bosnia and Herzegovina, a federal state in a former FPR Yugoslavia.
  He has said that he "has in some way stayed a citizen of the former country [Yugoslavia], but till today has not stopped feeling as a Sarajlija [Sarajevan]," and that he is "a Sarajevan and Bosnian" wherever he is and "that is the way it will be the rest of" his life.
  Additionally, in a 2024 interview, Čolić has explicitly stated (when asked why he loves Bosnia and Herzegovina) that he considers himself "a Bosnian and nothing else".
  He first moved to Belgrade (SR Serbia) in late 1971 to join Korni Grupa, and after living there for six months—he returned to Sarajevo (SR BiH) to finish his studies. He served the SFR Yugoslavia military in SR Serbia between 1978 and 1980. He lived in Ljubljana (SR Slovenia) in 1984; then lived in Zagreb (SR Croatia) for five years. He finally moved again back to Belgrade in 1989 where he lived.

== Sources ==
- Puls Online. "Zdravko Čolić - Čola". Lična karta. Puls Online. Archived from the original on 5 July 2014.
- "Biografija". Zdravko Čolić. 13 October 2012.
- "Biografija". Opusteno.

| Preceded by Tereza Kesovija | Yugoslavia in the Eurovision Song Contest; 1973 | Succeeded by Korni grupa |
