= Zavičaj =

Studio album by Zdravko Čolić
- Released: 2006.
- Studios: Studio Go Go, Belgrade; Sky Studio, Belgrade; Radio Beograd Studio VI, Belgrade; Studio Rockoko, Zagreb; Studio RSL, Novo Mesto; Real World Studios, Box
- Genres: pop, pop-folk, folk jazz
- Length: 60:25
- Label: mt:s
- Producers: Vojislav Aralica; Nikša Bratoš

Zdravko Čolić chronology
Čarolija (2003)	Zavičaj (2006)	Kad pogledaš me preko ramena (2010)

Zavičaj (transl. homeland) is the twelfth studio album by Zdravko Čolić, released in 2006. The album was not released and distributed by a conventional record label, but through Telekom Srbija's mobile division mt:s. With the CD purchase, the buyer also got RSD100 prepaid mobile phone card as well as a one-month free internet coupon. In the first two days after release, the album sold more than 100,000 copies.

== Track listing ==
1. Mangupska (Rascal Song)
2. Hajmo negdje nasamo (Let's Go Somewhere To Be Alone)
3. Zavičaj (Homeland)
4. Bembaša (Bimbashi)
5. Svadbarskim sokakom (Down The Wedding Alley)
6. Rakija (Brandy)
7. Sto puta (A Hundred Times)
8. Vrijeme (Time)
9. Kod tri bijesna brata (At The Three Angry Brother's Place)
10. Kao moja mati (Like My Mother)
11. Merak mi je (It’s My Passion)
12. Sačuvaj me, Bože, njene ljubavi (Spare Me Her Love, God)
13. Nevjera (Disloyalty)
14. Anđela (Angela)
