= Kornelije Kovač =

Serbian composer (1942–2022)

Kornelije Kovač Корнелије Ковач
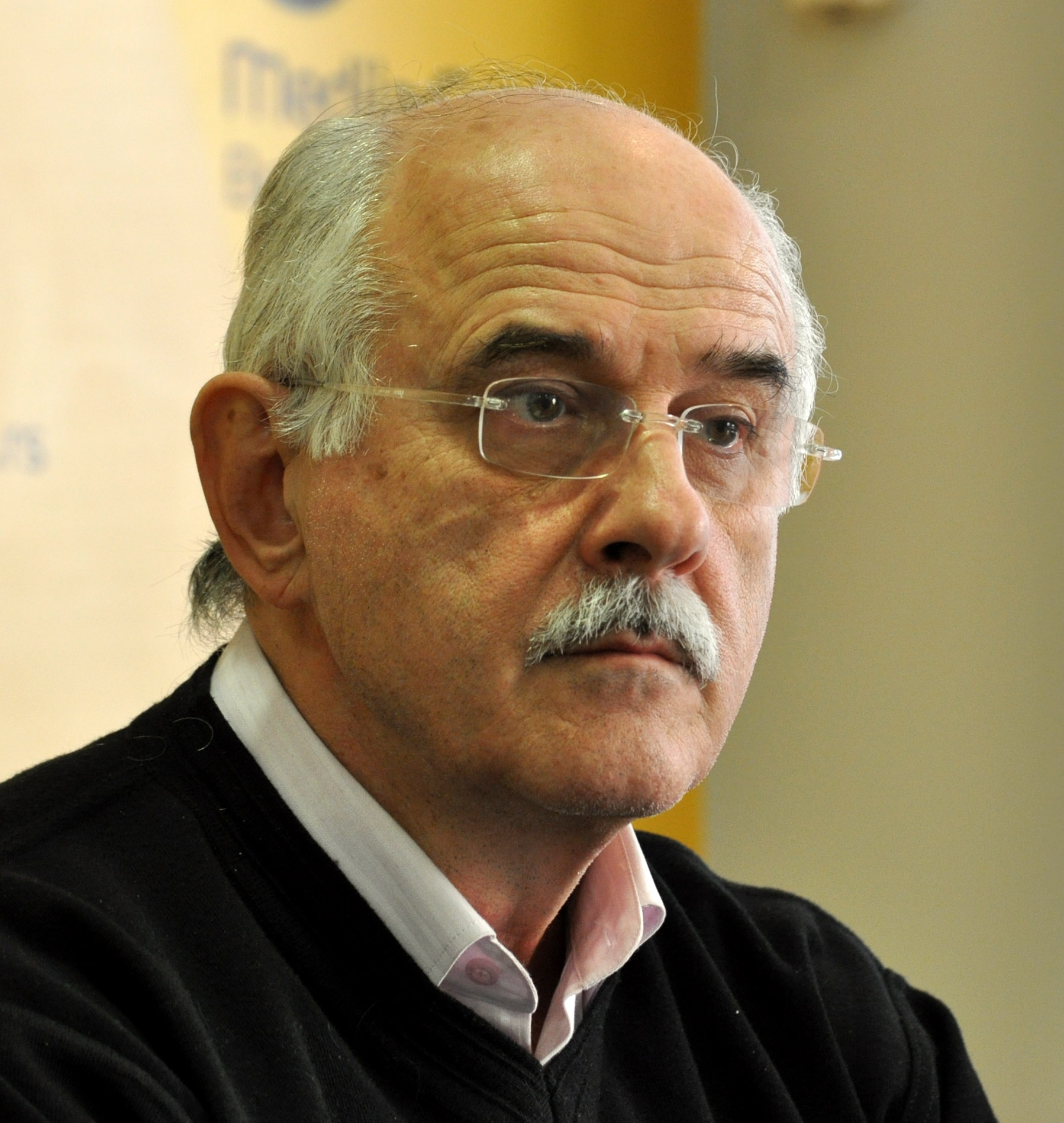
- Kovač promoting Festival Omladina in 2011

Background information
- Also known as: Kornél Kovács
- Born: Kornelije Kovač; 1 January 1942; Niš, German-occupied Serbia
- Died: 13 September 2022 (aged 80) Belgrade, Serbia
- Genres: Progressive rock, symphonic rock, jazz-rock, classical
- Occupations: Musician, songwriter, composer, producer
- Instruments: Keyboards, organ, piano
- Years active: 1961–2022
- Labels: PGP-RTB, Casa Ricordi, Philips Records, Jugoton, Komuna, PGP-RTS, ITMM

Kornelije "Bata" Kovač (Serbian Cyrillic: Корнелије "Бата" Ковач, pronounced [kɔ̌rne̞ːlije̞ bǎːta kɔ̂v̞atʃ]; Hungarian: Kovács Kornél; 1 January 1942 – 13 September 2022) was a Serbian composer.

== Early life ==
Born in Niš during World War II in the Nazi-occupied Serbia to a Hungarian father and a Serbian mother, Kovač grew up in a prominent artistic family - his grandfather was a conductor, his father a music professor and a violinist, and his mother a singer in the opera choir.

Kovač received his early music education at the College of Music in Subotica, after which he attempted to enroll in the Belgrade Music Academy. He did not pass the entrance exam so he entered the Sarajevo Music Academy of University of Sarajevo where he graduated from the Theory and Piano Department.

== Career ==
A composer, pianist, keyboard player, producer and arranger, Kovač's career as a professional musician started in 1961, when he formed his first band, BKB, which became a prominent jazz trio at the time. In 1963 they entered The Yu Jazz Festival, that took place in Bled (Slovenia).

After conducting the various orchestras in Bosnia, he finally joined Sarajevo's most popular pop band Indeksi. With them he had a two-month-long tour in Russia. In 1968, he moved to the Yugoslav capital, Belgrade, where he founded Korni Grupa. As a composer and a musician, he won many music contests in former Yugoslavia. With Korni Grupa he entered the following music festivals in Europe:

- 1969 - Singing Europe (Netherlands), voted the most original entry
- 1970 - Rock Festival Katowice (Poland)
- 1972 - Montreux (Switzerland)
- 1974 - Eurovision Song Festival (Brighton, United Kingdom)

In 1978, Kovač moved to England where he collaborated in various projects, such as: the 1978 Reading Rock Festival as the keyboardist of the Jenny Darren Band. Among the prominent British musicians with whom Kovač worked while in the UK, included:

- Bernie Marsden, guitar player of "White Snake"
- Hans Zimmer, composer
- Paul Jones, ex-singer of Manfred Mann
- Andy Pask, bass player of Landscape

== Later projects ==
Kovač wrote music for theatre, movies and television. His songs were released on LP-s in Yugoslavia, Spain, France, the United States, the Netherlands, Sweden, Finland, Norway etc. Many of them were Golden or Platinum Records. From 1979, he participated in projects in Spain, as a producer, composer or arranger.

== Personal life and death ==
He is the father of three daughters: Aleksandra, Kristina, and Anja, and a son he had in his second marriage after the death of his first wife Spomenka Stojanović in 2005. Aleksandra and Kristina are also musicians who used to perform together as K2.

On 19 January 2011, Serbian broadcaster RTS announced that Kovač and his two daughters, Aleksandra and Kristina, would each compose a song and present a singer, who would seek to represent Serbia in the Eurovision Song Contest 2011.

Kovač died in Belgrade on 13 September 2022, at the age of 80.
