= Aleksandar Nikolić Hall =

Indoor arena in Serbia

- Хала Александар Николић
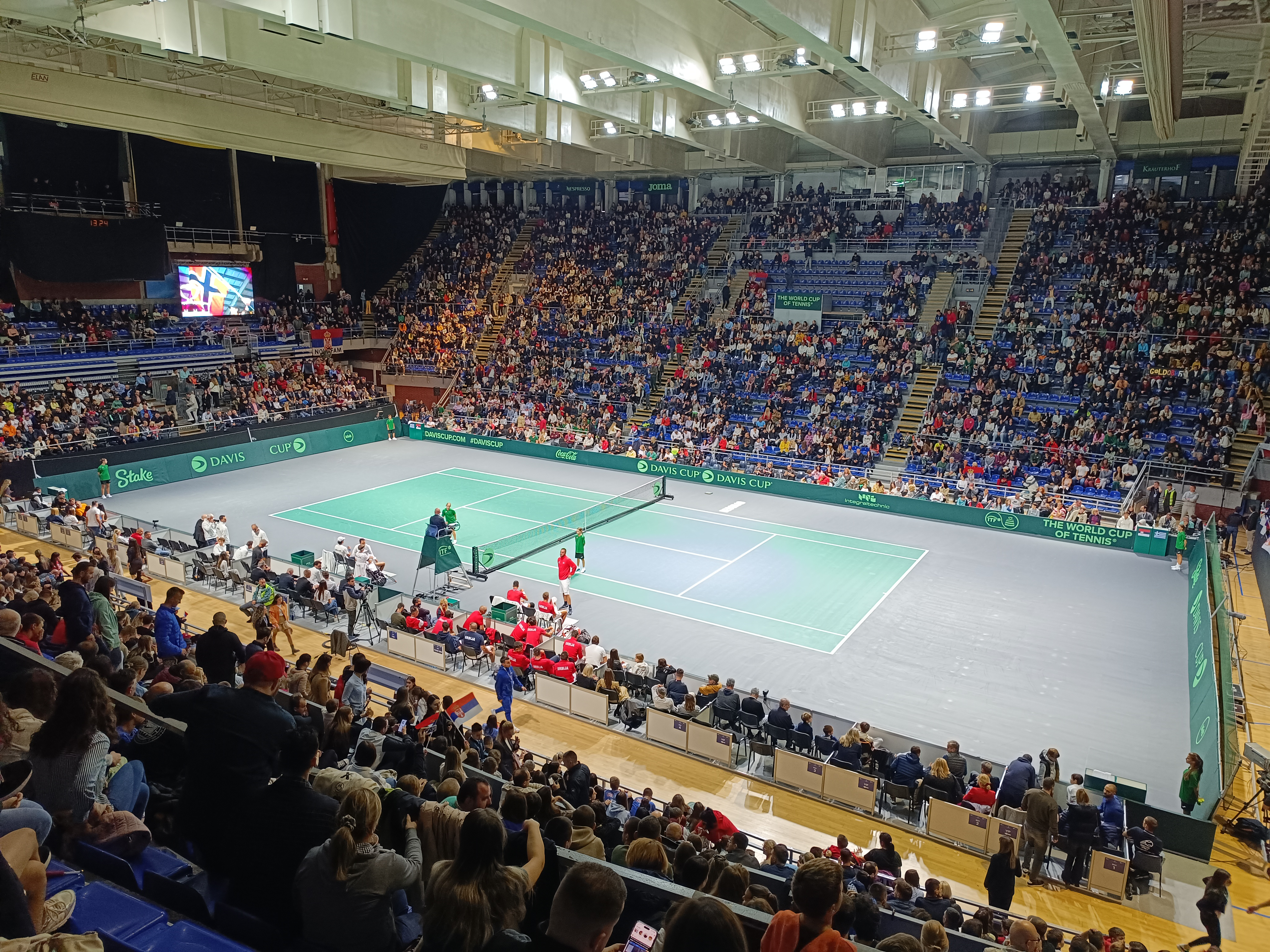
- Interior during a Davis Cup tennis match between Serbia and Greece, September 2024
- Interactive map of Aleksandar Nikolić Hall
- Former names: Hala Pionir (1973–2016)
- Location: Belgrade, Serbia
- Coordinates: 44°48′55.86″N 20°29′6.40″E
- Owner: City of Belgrade
- Operator: Tašmajdan SRC
- Capacity: 8,000
- Surface: Hardwood
- Scoreboard: Yes

Construction
- Opened: 24 May 1973; 53 years ago
- Renovated: 2019
- Expanded: 2019
- Architects: Ljiljana and Dragoljub Bakić
- General contractor: Energoprojekt

Tenants
- KK Crvena zvezda (1973–present); KK Partizan (1991–2019); Maccabi Tel Aviv (2023–2026; temporary)

The Aleksandar Nikolić Hall (Serbian: Xала Александар Николић, romanized: Hala Aleksandar Nikolić) is an indoor sports arena located in Palilula, Belgrade, Serbia. The official seating capacity of the arena is 8,000.

Formerly known as Pionir Hall (Serbian: Xала Пионир, romanized: Hala Pionir), it was renamed in 2016 in honour of Serbian basketball player and coach Aleksandar Nikolić. The hall is well known for its frequent matches between different basketball clubs, especially Crvena zvezda, Partizan, and foreign clubs. Projected by Ljiljana and Dragoljub Bakić, the hall has been described as the "architectural icon of the postmodernist Belgrade".

== History ==
Constructed in 1973 by Ljiljana and Dragoljub Bakić under a tight deadline, the modernist building won the architects a "Grand Prix of the Belgrade Architecture Salon". The structure was noted for its use of repeated elements and natural light.

The arena hosted the final round of EuroBasket 1975, the final of the EuroLeague's 1976–77 season (in which Maccabi Tel Aviv defeated Pallacanestro Varese), and the FIBA EuroCup's 1997–98 season final. In October 1989, the 16th World Judo Championships took place in Pionir Hall.

The arena hosted several preliminary round games of the EuroBasket 2005 and 2013 World Women's Handball Championship.

On 23 February 2016, the name of the arena was changed from Pionir Hall to Hall Aleksandar Nikolić, after the former basketball player and coach, Aleksandar "Aca" Nikolić.

In April 2017, the arena played host to the Davis Cup World Group Quarterfinal between Serbia and Spain, with Serbia winning the tie 4-1 to advance to the semifinals.

In 2019, the hall was thoroughly renovated, at a cost of €2 million euros. The renovation included new seats, telescopic stands, a new hardwood court and screens, new lighting, modernization of the ventilation and air-conditioning systems, and an increased seating capacity.

In October 2023, it was decided that the Israeli team Maccabi Tel Aviv will play its home international games in Aleksandar Nikolić Hall due to a security concerns because of an ongoing Gaza war.

== Gallery ==
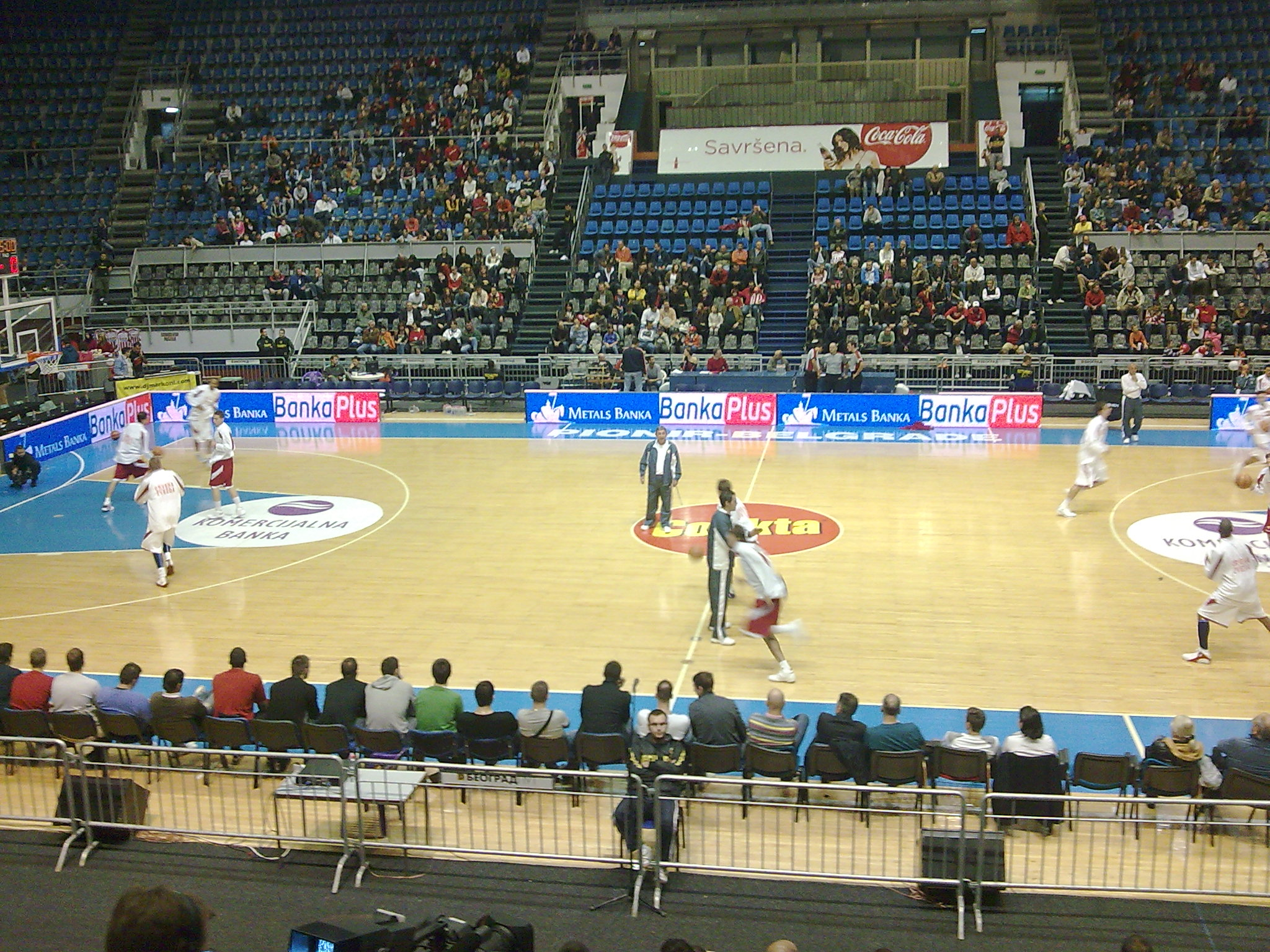
Crvena zvezda players practice under the command of head coach Svetislav Pešić in 2008

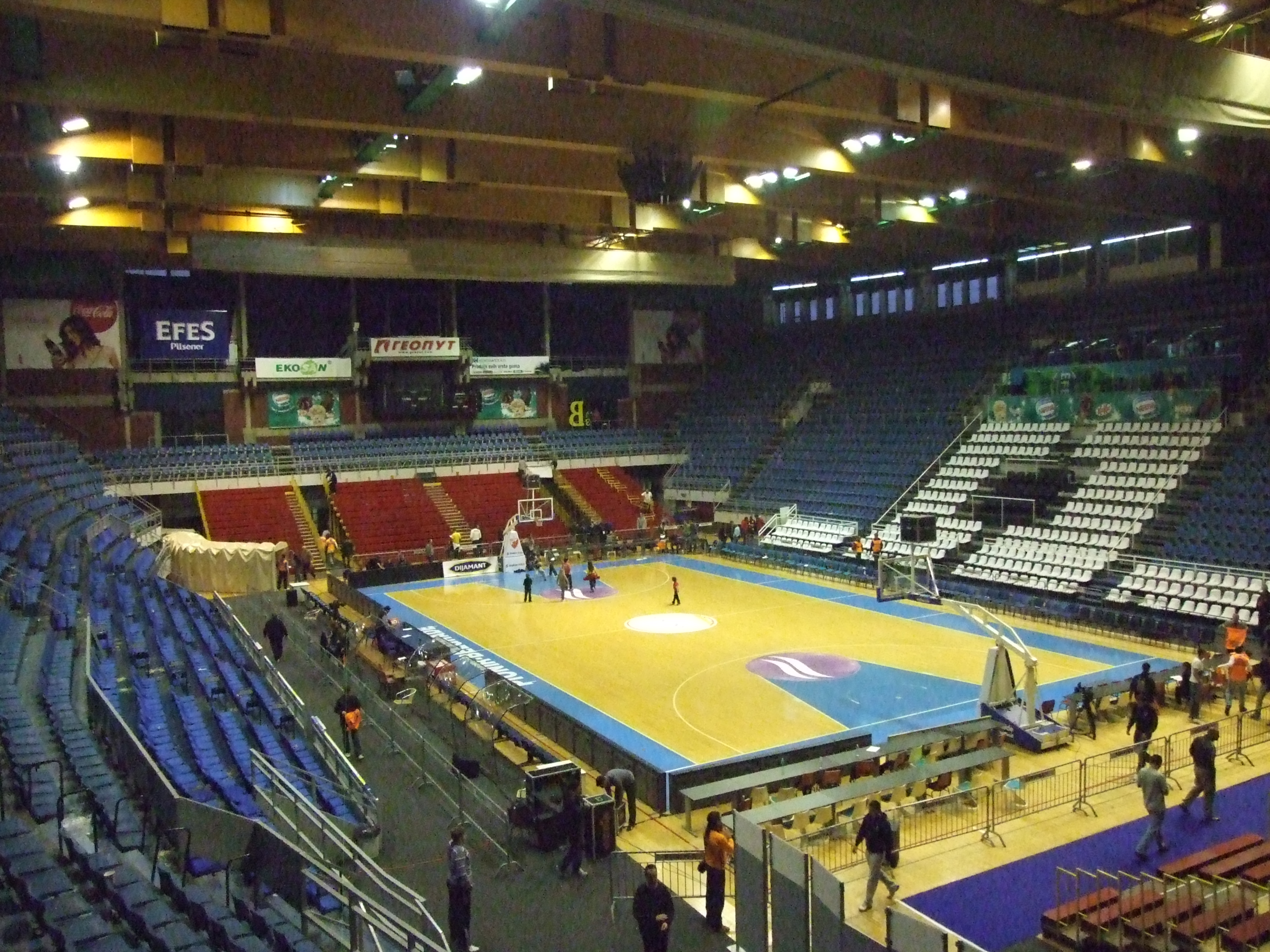
The venue's interior in June 2010

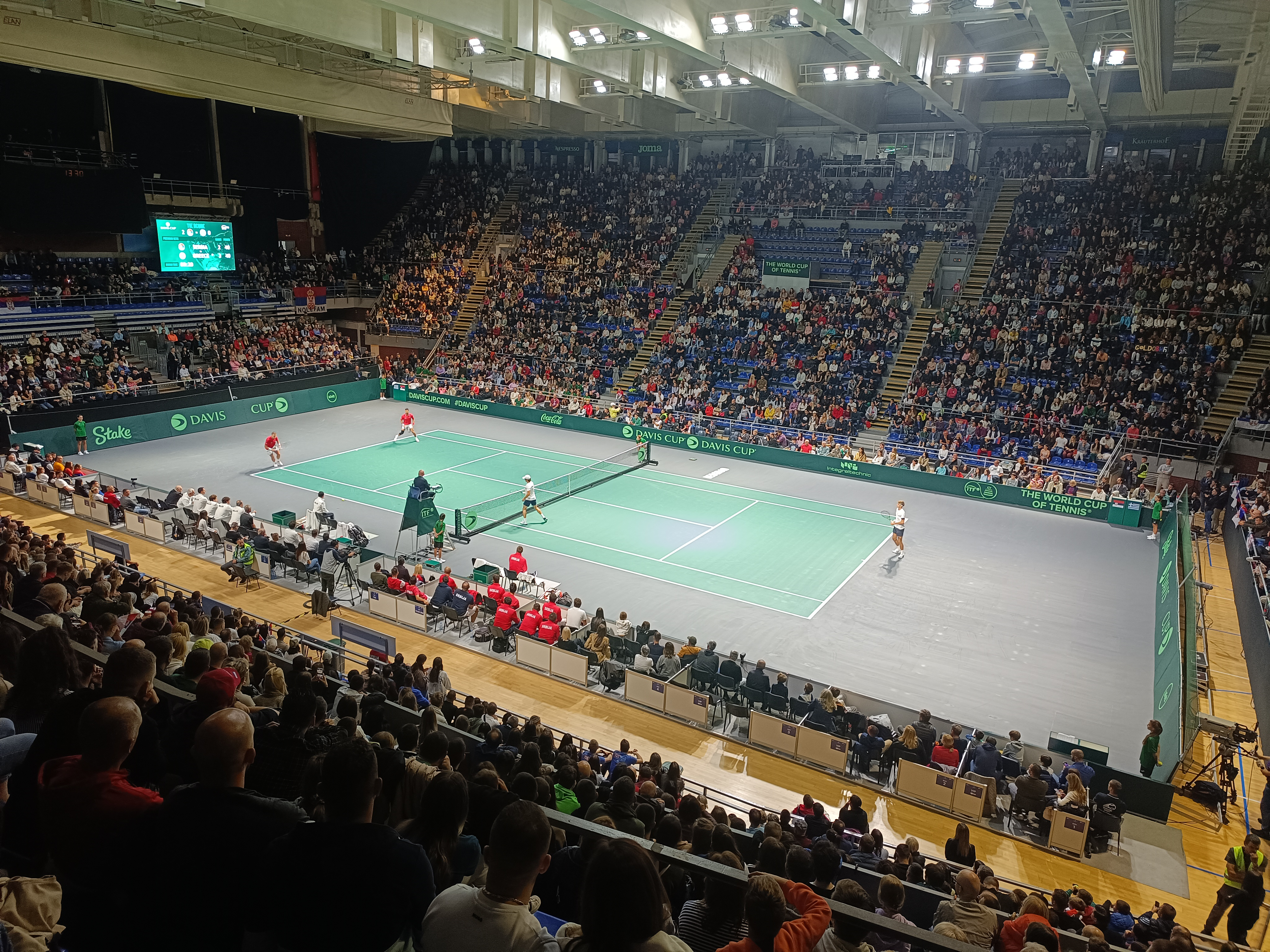
Doubles playing during the Davis Cup match between Serbia and Greece, September 2024

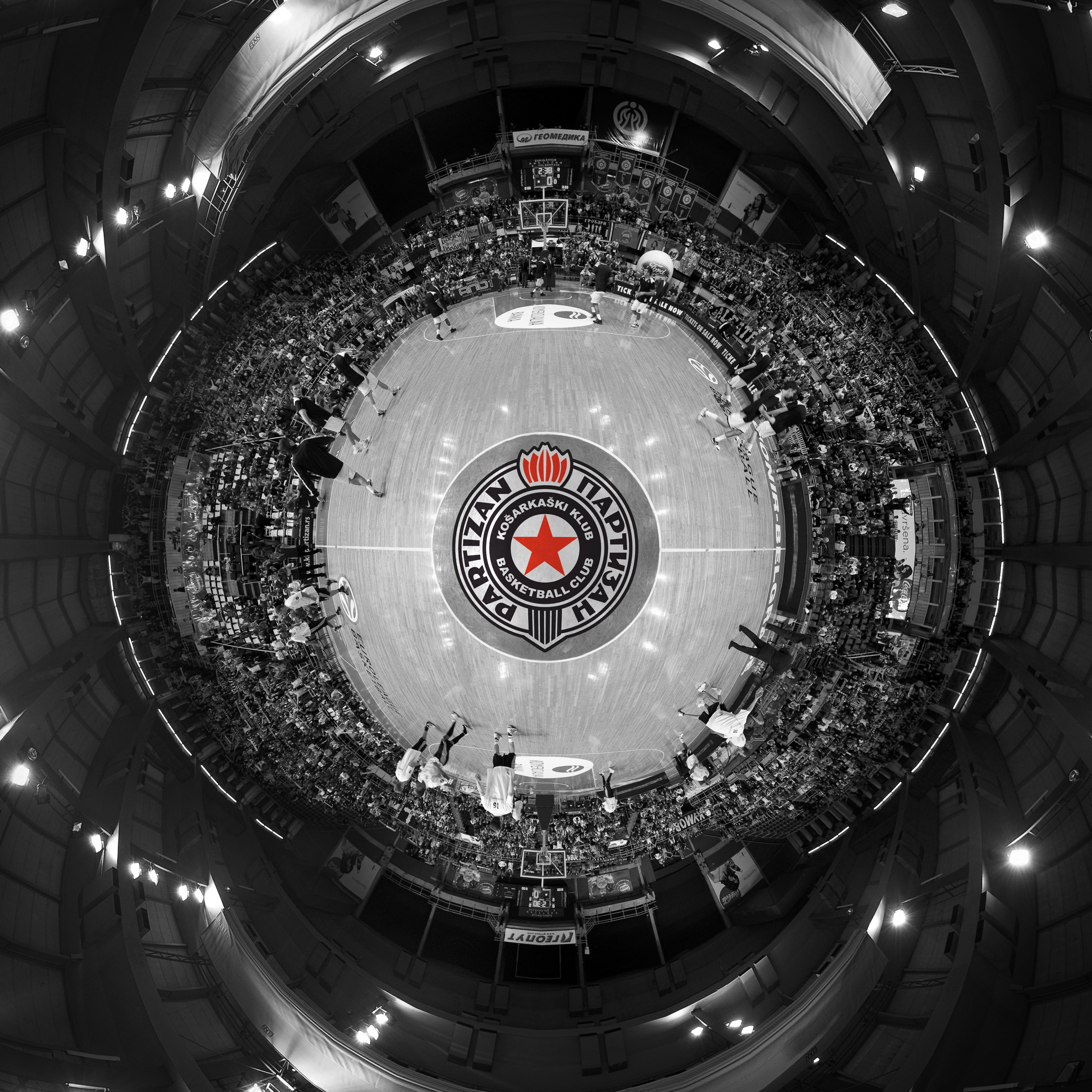
Polar projection of the Alexander Nikolić Hall, 2016

== Concerts ==
List of concerts
1970s

1970s

- September 20, 1972 - Ray Charles
- November 1, 1974 - Ike & Tina Turner
- March 16, 1975 - Deep Purple (Stormbringer Tour, opening acts: Elf, Smak)
- April 4, 1975 - Nazareth
- April 13, 1975 - Jethro Tull
- October 5, 1975 - Santana and Earth, Wind & Fire
- November 20, 1975 - Ike & Tina Turner
- February 9, 1976 - Bijelo Dugme (Šta bi dao da si na mom mjestu Tour)
- February 10, 1976 - Bijelo Dugme
- February 11, 1976 - Bijelo Dugme
- February 26, 1976 - Suzi Quatro
- June 16, 1976 - BOOM Festival 1976
- March 3, 1977 - Bijelo Dugme (Eto! Baš hoću! Tour)
- March 4, 1977 - Bijelo Dugme
- March 5, 1977 - Bijelo Dugme
- September 8, 1977 - Smak (Crna dama Tour)
- September 9, 1977 - Smak
- October 8, 1977 - Uriah Heep (Firefly Tour)
- March 7, 1978 - Dr. Feelgood
- April 4, 1978 - Zdravko Čolić (Putujući zemljotres Tour)
- April 8, 1978 - Zdravko Čolić
- June 1978 - Boney M.
- April 20, 1979 - Slade
- April 21, 1979 - Bijelo Dugme (Bitanga i princeza Tour; the entire revenue from the five concerts, almost US$100,000, was donated to the 1979 Montenegro earthquake victims and survivors fund)
- April 22, 1979 - Bijelo Dugme
- April 23, 1979 - Bijelo Dugme
- April 24, 1979 - Bijelo Dugme
- April 25, 1979 - Bijelo Dugme
- May 8, 1979 - Tina Turner
- June 29, 1979 - José Feliciano
- October 10, 1979 - Eric Clapton
1980s

1980s

- October, 1980 - Zdravko Čolić (Zbog tebe Tour)
- October, 1980 - Zdravko Čolić
- October, 1980 - Zdravko Čolić
- October 31, 1980 - Weather Report (11th Belgrade Jazz Festival)
- December 31, 1980 - "Atomska Čorba" (1981 New Year's celebration: Atomsko sklonište and Riblja Čorba)
- March 2, 1982 - Gillan (opening acts: Tygers of Pan Tang, Pomaranča)
- April 8, 1982 - Riblja Čorba (Mrtva priroda Tour)
- April 9, 1982 - Riblja Čorba
- April 10, 1982 - Riblja Čorba
- April 11, 1982 - Riblja Čorba (U ime naroda live album recorded)
- May 13, 1982 - Majski Rock & Blues Festival (Alvin Lee Band, Stan Webb's Speedway, and Nightwing)
- June 12, 1982 - Classix Nouveaux
- June 1982 - Vatreni Poljubac
- July 27, 1982 - Talking Heads
- October 17, 1982 - Joe Cocker (originally scheduled for 1 October 1982, but rescheduled to the 17th due to Cocker's illness)
- October 20, 1982 - Wishbone Ash
- October 23, 1982 - Tangerine Dream (White Eagle European Tour)
- March 2, 1983 - UFO
- March 18, 1983 - Saxon
- May 14, 1983 - Uriah Heep (Head First Tour)
- May 30, 1983 - Peter Green
- February 28, 1984 - Bo Diddley & Mainsqueeze
- March 6, 1984 - Eric Burdon
- April 18, 1984 - Elton John (European Express Tour)
- May 13, 1984 - Riblja Čorba (Večeras vas zabavljaju muzičari koji piju Tour)
- September 24, 1984 - Motörhead
- February 16, 1985 - Zabranjeno Pušenje (Das ist Walter Tour)
- May 10, 1985 - Dire Straits (Brothers in Arms Tour)
- May 11, 1985 - Dire Straits
- December 8, 1985 - MESAM Festival 1985 (Riblja Čorba, etc.)
- December 18, 1985 - Eddy Grant
- January 1986 - 5th Poselo Godine (Mitar Mirić, Miroslav Ilić, Halid Muslimović, Marinko Rokvić, Miloš Bojanić, Halid Bešlić, Vesna Zmijanac, Ferid Avdić, Vera Matović, Nada Topčagić)
- March 21, 1986 - Riblja Čorba (Osmi nervni slom Tour)
- March 29, 1986 - Bajaga i Instruktori
- April 29, 1986 - Status Quo (In the Army Now Tour)
- September 10, 1986 - Iron Maiden (Somewhere on Tour, opening act: Waysted)
- 1986 - Halid Muslimović
- December 3, 1986 - Nazareth & Girlschool
- February 4, 1987 - Alvin Lee & Wishbone Ash
- February 14, 1987 - Vesna Zmijanac
- April 5, 1987 - Spandau Ballet (Through the Barricades Tour)
- 1987 - Alisa
- November 10, 1987 - Cliff Richard
- November 13, 1987 - Ekatarina Velika (Ljubav Tour)
- November 14, 1987 - Ekatarina Velika
- November 1987 - Halid Bešlić
- December 12, 1987 - Bajaga i Instruktori
- January 22, 1988 - 7th Poselo Godine (Halid Bešlić, Duško Kuliš, Halid Muslimović, Šerif Konjević, Nada Obrić)
- February 7, 1988 - Vesna Zmijanac
- January 22, 1989 - 8th Poselo Godine (Ana Bekuta, Vera Matović, Jašar Ahmedovski, Jasmin Muharemović, Boban Zdravković, Dragana Mirković)
1990s

1990s

- February 3, 1990 - Hit Decenije (Radio Belgrade 202's Hit nedelje celebration, performers: Bajaga i Instruktori, Galija, YU Grupa, Dejan Cukić & Spori Ritam Band, Nikola Čuturilo, Đavoli, Bezobrazno Zeleno, FIT, and Karizma)
- February 4, 1990 - 9th Poselo Godine (Milena Plavšić, Zorica Brunclik, Ljuba Aličić, Mitar Mirić, Boban Zdravković, Jašar Ahmedovski, Šaban Šaulić, Haris Džinović, Dragana Mirković)
- May 22, 1990 - The Stranglers
- January 27, 1991 - 10th Poselo Godine (Šeki Turković, Radiša Urošević, Snežana Đurišić, Zoran Kalezić, Biljana Jevtić, Ljuba Aličić, Ipče Ahmedovski, Mitar Mirić, Boban Zdravković, Dragan Kojić Keba, Džej Ramadanovski)
- January 27, 1992 - 11th Poselo Godine (Dragana Mirković, Zlata Petrović, Radiša Urošević, Jasmin Muharemović, Šeki Turković, Jašar Ahmedovski, Ceca Veličković, Ana Bekuta, Dragan Kojić Keba, Džej Ramadanovski, Mira Škorić, Zoran Gajić Grozdinac)
- April 3, 1994 - Riblja Čorba (Zbogom, Srbijo Tour, opening acts: Minđušari, Babe)
- May 27, 1995 - Mira Škorić (guests: Vesna Zmijanac and Ceca Ražnatović); broadcast live on Pink television
- November 23, 1995 - Ceca Ražnatović
- December 8, 1995 - The Prodigy (opening acts: DJ S.T.R.O.B. (Dejan Mirković) & DJ Mark Wee (Marko Vajagić))
- May 13, 1997 - Body Count (opening act: Channel Zero)
- December 25, 1997 - Zabranjeno Pušenje (Ja nisam odavle Tour)
- March 20, 1998 - Dragana Mirković
- October 10, 1999 - Aca Lukas
2000s

2000s

- December 23, 2002 - Željko Joksimović
- June 20, 2004 - Zvezde Granda 2004 Final (Bane Mojićević, Stevan Anđelković, Tanja Savić, Darko Filipović, Nemanja Nikolić, and Slavica Ćukteraš)
- May 21, 2005 - Luciano Pavarotti
- August 31, 2006 - Simply Red
- September 5, 2007 - Tool (10,000 Days Tour)
2010s

2010s

- April 1, 2010 - 50 Cent
- October 1, 2010 - Aco Pejović (guest: Aca Lukas)
- November 24, 2013 - Marko Bulat
- November 22, 2015 - Whitesnake (opening act: The Dead Daisies)

== See also ==
- List of indoor arenas in Serbia

Preceded by Palau dels Esports; Barcelona	EuroBasket; Final venue 1975	Succeeded by Country Hall du Sart Tilman; Liège
Preceded by Patinoire des Vernets; Geneva	FIBA European Champions Cup; Final venue 1977	Succeeded by Rudi-Sedlmayer-Halle; Munich
Preceded by Eleftheria Indoor Hall; Nicosia	FIBA EuroCup; Final venue 1998	Succeeded by Príncipe Felipe Arena; Zaragoza
Preceded by None	Zvezde Granda; Final venue 2004	Succeeded by Tašmajdan Stadium
Preceded by Arena Łódź; Łódź	European Women's Volleyball Championship; Final venue 2011	Succeeded by Max-Schmeling-Halle; Berlin
