= Music of Serbia =

Music of Serbia represents the musical heritage of Serbia, both historical and modern. It has a variety of traditional music styles, which are part of the wider Balkan musical tradition, with its own distinctive sound and characteristics.

== Music of the Middle Ages ==
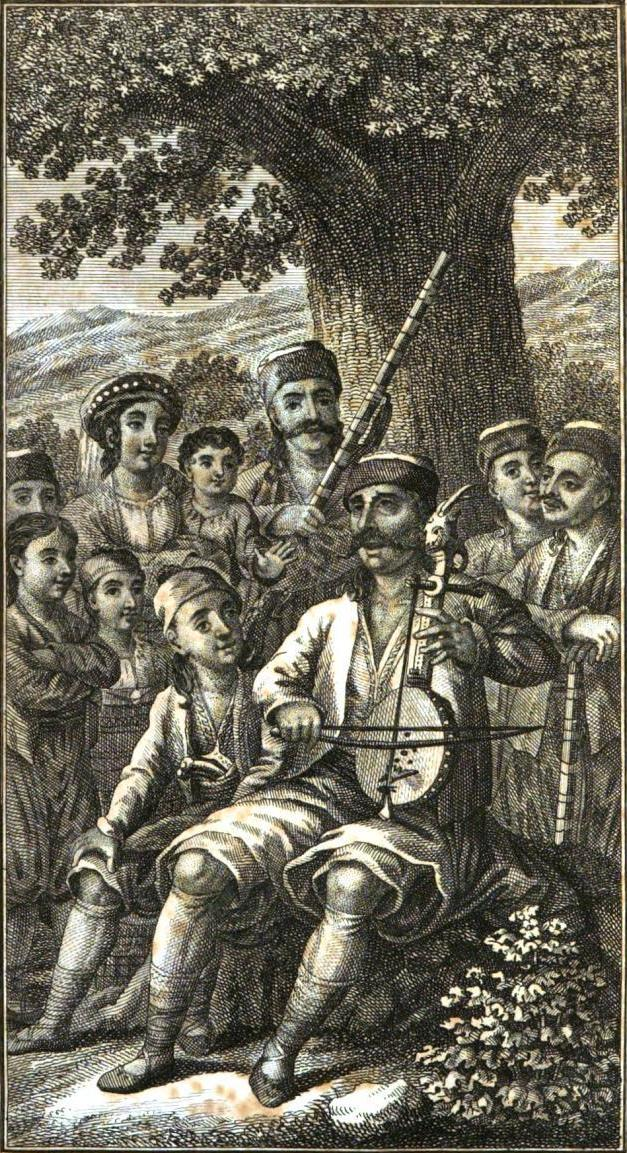
Serb from Herzegovina sings to gusle

Church music was performed throughout medieval Serbia by choirs or individual singers. The songs performed at the time were derived from the Octoechos (Osmoglasnik), a collection of religious songs dedicated to Jesus. Composers from this era include nun Jefimija, monks Kir Stefan the Serb, Isaiah the Serb, and Nikola the Serb, who together belong to the "Serbo-Byzantine school".

Aside from church music, the medieval era in Serbia included traditional music, about which little is known, and court music. During the Nemanjić dynasty era musicians played an important role at the royal court, and were known as sviralnici, glumci and praskavnici. The rulers known for the musical patronage included Emperor Stefan Dušan and Despot Đurađ Branković. Medieval musical instruments included horns, trumpets, lutes, psalteries, drums and cymbals. Traditional folk instruments include the gajde, kaval, dajre, diple, tamburitza, gusle, tapan (davul), šargija, ćemane (kemenche), zurla (zurna), and frula among others.

Sung Serbian epic poetry has been an integral part of Serbian and Balkan music for centuries. In the highlands of Serbia and Montenegro these long poems are typically accompanied on a one-string fiddle called the gusle, and concern themselves with themes from history and mythology. After the Ottoman conquest of Serbia, music was enriched with oriental influences at the expense of Serbian folk music. During Ottoman rule, Serbian faith and folk music went underground so to speak since the people were forbidden to own their property, to learn to write and read and were also denied the use of musical instruments. The Serbs however were stubbornly tenacious enough to maintain an oral history through folk poems and songs recited with the accompaniment of the Gusle. These brave defenders of Serbian art and culture in these arduous and treacherous times were the peasants who played the Gusle, a one-stringed instrument in the shape of a lute. As their punishment for playing a musical instrument, many of these musicians were blinded by their oppressors. Denied music or dance, the Serbs invented a silent kolo in which the syncopation of the pounding of the feet became an instantaneous musical accompaniment to the folk dancers. This particular dance is still being performed today. The German poet Goethe so admired Serbian poetry and folklore that he learned to speak Slavonic-Serbian, the common language then spoken by Slavs in the Balkans and northern regions of the Austrian Empire. Goethe and Grimm's works were also the major inspiration in encouraging Brahms, Carl Loewe, Tor Aulin, Anton Dvorak, Leos Janacek, Josef Suk, Peter Tchaikovsky and Josef Maria Wolfram (1789–1839) to create compositions based on Serbian folk poetry and literature. Brahms' famous lullaby is derived from a Serbian folk poem. When the Jews fled Spain the Serbs provided a hospitable environment in which they could resettle and prosper, particularly in Sarajevo in Bosnia and Herzegovina and Serbia. The oldest Jewish Choir in the modern world is located in Belgrade. The formation of the Pančevo Church Choral Society in 1838 and the Belgrade Choral Society in 1853 resulted in each becoming centers for nurturing young talent. The first music schools were founded through the efforts of these choral societies.

From the Habsburg rule, Serbia was enriched by Western music.

== Classical music ==
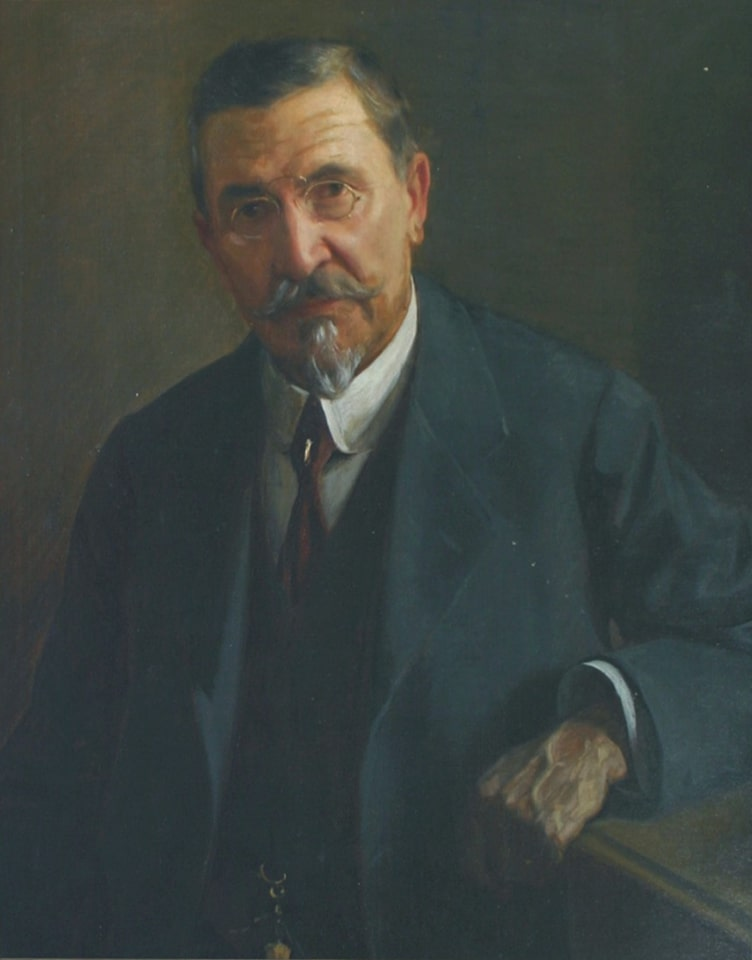
Stevan Stojanović Mokranjac

Composer and musicologist Stevan Stojanović Mokranjac is considered one of the most important founders of modern Serbian music. Born in 1856, Mokranjac taught music, collected Serbian traditional songs and did the first scholarly research on Serbian music. He was also the director of the first Serbian music school and one of the founders of the Union of Singing Societies. His most famous works are the Song Wreaths, also known as Garlands.

During the 19th and 20th centuries numerous bands, both military and civilian, contributed to the development of music culture in Belgrade and other Serbian cities and towns. Prior to Mokranjac's era, Serbia's representatives of the Romantic period were world-renowned violinist Dragomir Krančević, pianist Sidonija Ilić, pianist and composer Jovanka Stojković and opera singer Sofija Sedmakov who achieved success performing in opera houses of Germany in the 1890s. For example, the promenade concert tradition was first established by The Serbian Prince Band founded in 1831, and its first conductor was Joseph Shlezinger, who composed music for the band based on traditional Serbian songs. This was a period when the first choral societies, then mostly sung in German and Italian language, were being organized. Later, the first Serbian language works for choirs were written by Kornelije Stanković.

The Serbian composers Petar Konjović, Stevan Hristić and Miloje Milojević, all born in the 1880s, were the most eminent composers of their generation. They maintained the national expression and modernized romanticism in the direction of impressionism.

The best-known composers born around 1910 studied in Europe, mostly in Prague. Ljubica Marić, Stanojlo Rajičić, Milan Ristić took influence from Schoenberg, Hindemith and Haba, rejecting the "conservative" work of prior Serbian composers, seeing it as outdated and the wish for national expression was outside their interest.

Other famous classical Serbian composers include Isidor Bajić, Stanislav Binički and Josif Marinković.

Several notable composers used motifs from Serbian folk music and composed works inspired by Serbian history or culture, such as: Johannes Brahms, Franz Liszt, Arthur Rubinstein, Antonín Dvořák, Pyotr Ilyich Tchaikovsky, Nikolai Rimsky-Korsakov, Franz Schubert, Hans Huber and others. In 1788, just before the start of the Habsburg–Ottoman War, a classical period composer Wolfgang Amadeus Mozart composed the La Bataille K. 535 (also known as “Die Belagerung Belgrads” – “The Siege of Belgrade”), which was most likely inspired by previous sieges of Belgrade, while some scholars state that the composition was used to support the war effort. Thanks to Miloš Obrenović's good contacts during his stay in Vienna, Johann Strauss II composed the Serben-Quadrille intended for Serbian balls. During the Serbian–Turkish Wars, Pyotr Ilyich Tchaikovsky composed the Marche slave, which was based on several Serbian folk songs. Nikolai Rimsky-Korsakov used some Serbian folk tunes to compose the Fantasy on Serbian Themes (1867).

== Serbian folk music ==
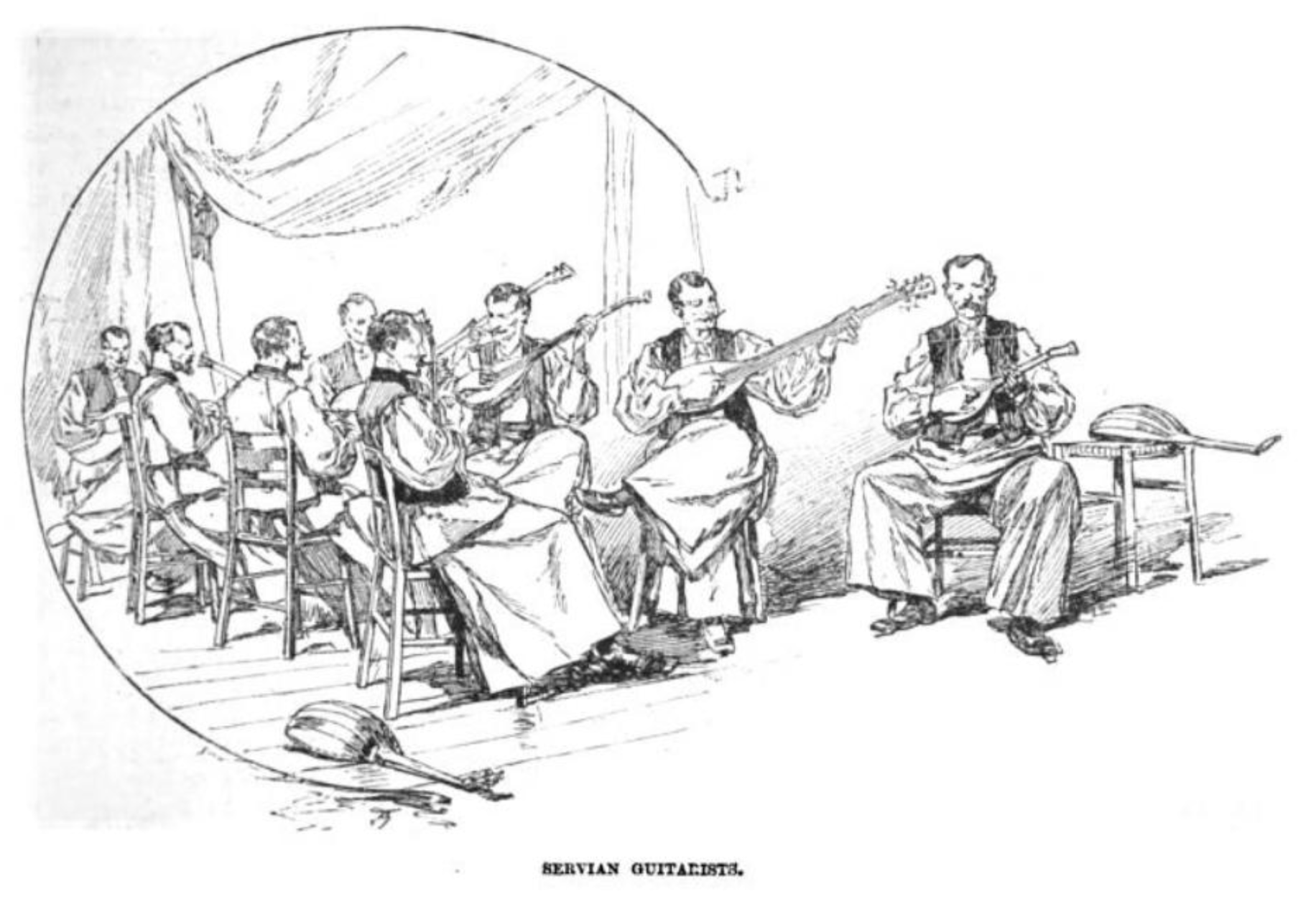
Serbian tamburaši, 1890

=== Ethno music ===
Excerpt of an accordion performance at the Pokrajinski festival of Sombor in 2010.

Frula can be heard in this performance of a Serb folk song.

The ethno genre encompasses both vocal and non-vocal (instrumental) music. Instruments include bagpipes, flutes, horns, trumpets, lutes, psalteries, drums and cymbals such as: Frula (woodwind), Diple (dvojanka, woodwind), Gajde (bagpipe), Zurna (woodwind), Duduk (woodwind), Tambura (lute), Tamburitza (lute), Gusle (lute), Kaval (šupeljka, lute), Davul (tapan, goč, drum), Bouzouki (šargija, lute), Tarambuke (drum). Balkanika, Balkanopolis, Dvig, Slobodan Trkulja, Belo Platno, Teodulija, Kulin Ban are known Serbian musical groups that use traditional Balkan musical instruments and perform traditional songs and songs based on traditional music elements.

=== Old folk ===
The Serbian folk music is both rural (izvorna muzika) and urban (starogradska muzika) and includes a two-beat dance called kolo, which is a circle dance with almost no movement above the waist, accompanied by instrumental music made most often with an accordion, but also with other instruments: frula (traditional kind of a recorder), tamburica, or accordion. The Kolos usually last for about 5–13 minutes. Modern accordionists include Mirko Kodić and Ljubiša Pavković. Some kolos are similar to the Hungarian csárdás in that they are slow at the onset and gradually increase their speed until reaching a climax towards the end.

Famous performers of Serbian folk music are Predrag Gojković Cune, Predrag Živković Tozovac, Miroslav Ilić, Lepa Lukić, Vasilija Radojčić, Šaban Bajramović, Staniša Stošić, Toma Zdravković and others. Yugoslav singer, actress and writer, Olivera Katarina, has performed music of various genres, varying from Serbian traditional to pop music, and in numerous languages. She held 72 consecutive concerts in Paris Olympia.

=== New folk ===
During the 70s Serbian folk music started to use elements from oriental music, distancing from the original sound, style that is titled novokomponovana muzika ("newly composed music"). Soon many neo-folk singers emerged: Šaban Šaulić, Jašar Ahmedovski, Mitar Mirić, Nada Topčagić, Šeki Turković, Ipče Ahmedovski, Ljuba Aličić, Zorica Brunclik, Marinko Rokvić and others. Serbian folk scene was not homogeneous nor uniform. On one hand, following Western models, Vesna Zmijanac was creating a star-image, being sex-symbol, fashionista and gay icon as well. On the other hand, singers like Vera Matović, for example, have created folk subgenre, sort of rural folk, singing about works in field, domestic animals and themes from Serbian village. Louis was combining Serbian folk music with jazz. Their albums were sponsored and songs were broadcast on the Radio Television of Serbia, which led to domination of this genre.

=== Balkan brass ===
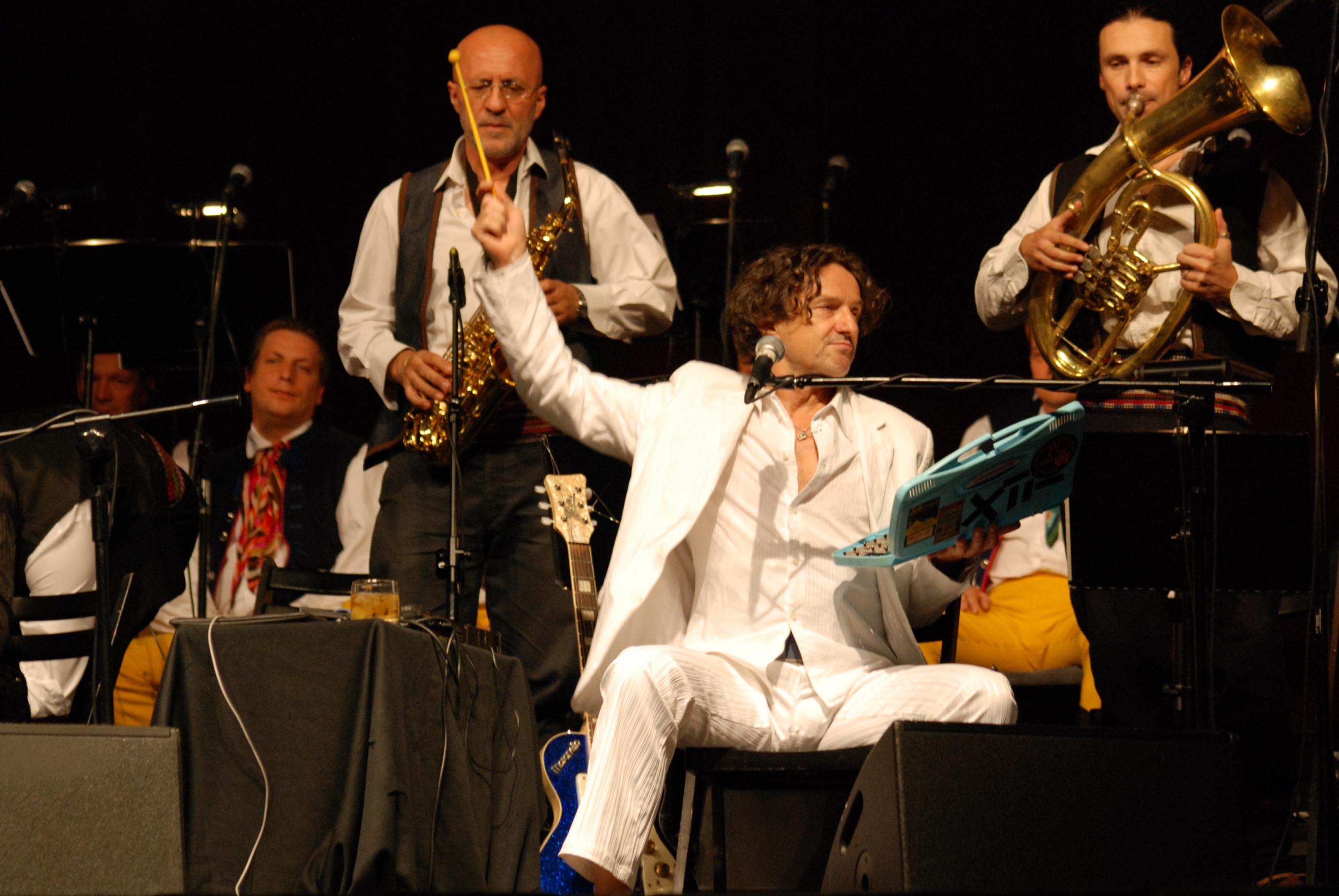
Goran Bregović performing live with his orchestra

Brass bands, known as trubači (Serbian Cyrillic: трубачи, "the trumpeters") are extremely popular, especially in Central and Southern Serbia where Balkan Brass Band originated. The trumpet was initially used as a military instrument to wake and gather soldiers and announce battles during First Serbian Uprising in the 19th century, but later took on the role of entertainment during downtime, as soldiers used it to transpose popular folk songs. When the war ended and the soldiers returned to the rural life, the music entered civilian life and eventually became a music style, accompanying special occasions such as slavas, baptisms, harvests, births and funerals. In 1831 the first official military band was formed by Prince Miloš Obrenović. Roma people have also adopted the tradition and enhanced the music, and today most of the best performers are Roma. The best known Serbian Brass musicians are Fejat Sejdić, and Boban Marković and are also the biggest names in the world of modern brass band bandleaders. Guča trumpet festival is one of the most popular and biggest music festivals in Serbia is a five-day annual festival with 300 000 visitors.

== Popular music ==
=== Pop music ===
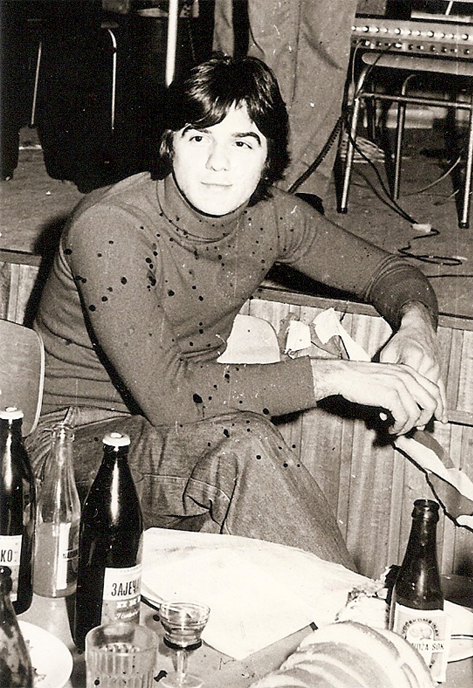
Zdravko Čolić in 1973

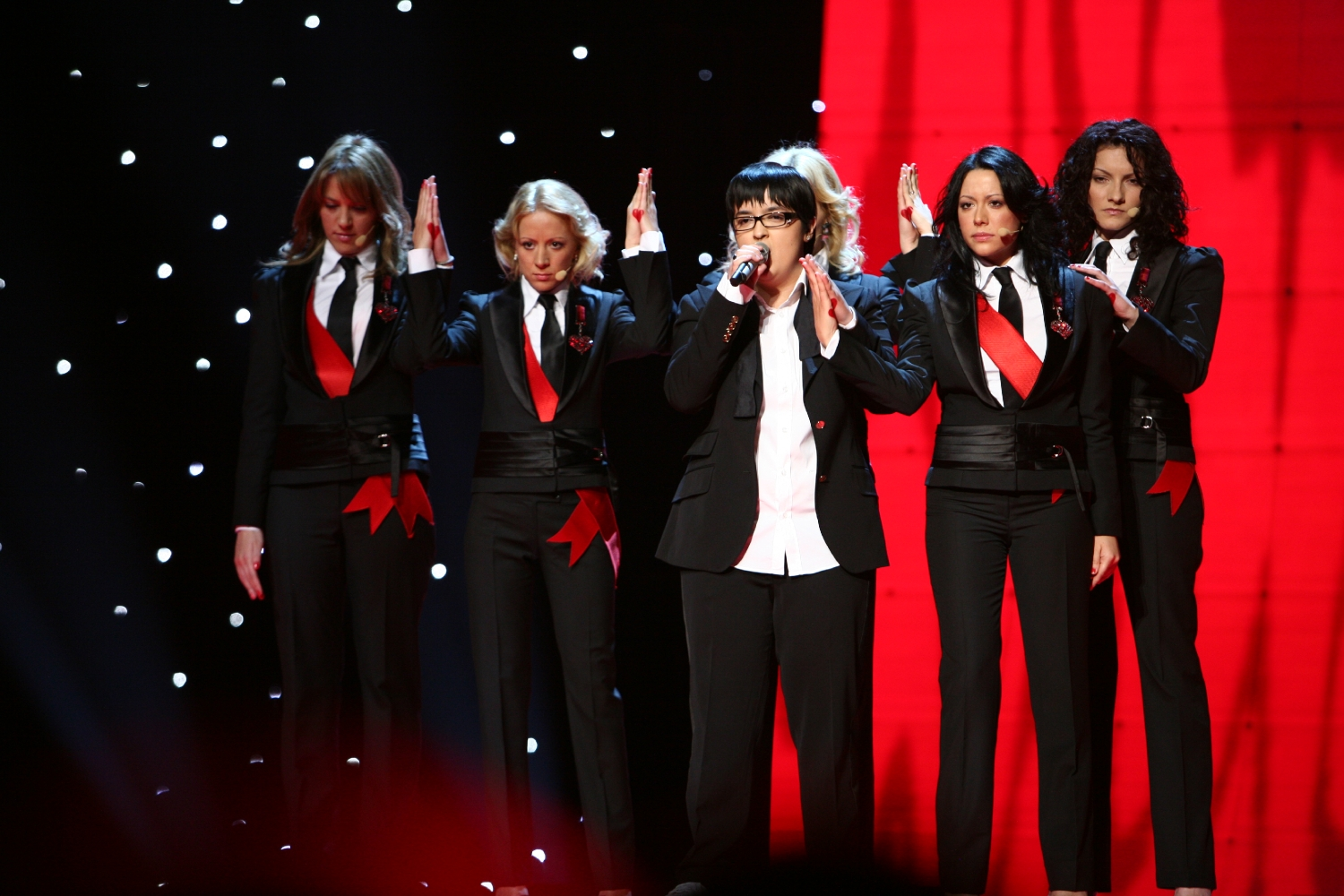
Marija Šerifović performing at the Eurovision Song Contest 2007

Various sources suggest that pop music existed in Serbia before the Second World War, including the claims of French entertainer Josephine Baker, who stated that she encountered gramophone records of this style of music during her trip to Serbia. Pop music grew in popularity during the following decades, especially during the late 1950s and 1960s with performers of schlager, such as Lola Novaković, Đorđe Marjanović and Dušan Jakšić. Some of the best known songs from this era include "Zvižduk u osam" by Marjanović and "Devojko mala", which was performed by actor Vlastimir Đuza Stojiljković in the popular movie Ljubav i moda (1960). Despite the fact that pop partially lost its popularity in Serbia to rock music during the 1970s and 1980s, it continued to stay relevant with disco-influenced artists such as Zdravko Čolić, who is recognized as one of the most prominent performers from the entire Yugoslavia. The 1980s also saw popularity of new wave music with acts like Zana and Bebi Dol. During the following decades however, pop music was significantly overshadowed by pop-folk. The 1990s pop was also marked by the influence of Europop with groups such as Tap 011 and K2.

Some of the best-known Serbian pop singers who have gained prominence in the 2000s are Vlado Georgiev, Marija Šerifović, Željko Joksimović, Aleksandra Radović, Tijana Dapčević, Jelena Tomašević, Nataša Bekvalac, Emina Jahović, Ana Nikolić and Saša Kovačević. Šerifović is also noted for winning the 2007 Eurovision Song Contest with Molitva, making her the only Serbian Eurovision winner.

Most prominent pop artists from the 2010s include: Sara Jo, Nikolija, Edita Aradinović, Teodora Džehverović, Anastasija Ražnatović, Elena Kitić, Angellina, Breskvica and Hurricane (Serbian band).

=== Rock music ===
As a member of the Non-Aligned Movement, Socialist Federal Republic of Yugoslavia, of which Serbia was a part, was far more open to western influences compared to the other socialist states. The western-influenced pop and rock music was socially accepted, the Yugoslav rock scene was well developed and covered in the media, which included numerous magazines, radio and TV shows. Following the breakup of Yugoslavia due to civil war, its rock scene also ceased to exist, but saw moderate revival in the 2000s. The most notable Serbian rock acts are Bajaga i Instruktori, Đorđe Balašević, Disciplina Kičme, Ekatarina Velika, Električni Orgazam, Galija, Idoli, Kerber, Korni Grupa, Laboratorija Zvuka, Partibrejkers, Pekinška Patka, Piloti, Pop Mašina, Rambo Amadeus, Riblja Čorba, Smak, Šarlo Akrobata, YU Grupa, Van Gogh, and others.

=== Popular folk music ===
Popular folk music, or simply pop-folk, gained in popularity during the 1980s when elements of Serbian folk music were combined with rock and pop music, as well as with elements of folk music from other Balkan cultures. During this decade two of the arguably biggest performers were Lepa Brena, who has sold over 40 million records and is recognized as one of the greatest symbols of Yugoslavia, and Vesna Zmijanac, who was noted as the sex symbol and fashion icon of the 1980s. In the following decade, pop-folk only grew in popularity as a result of the regime of Slobodan Milošević, Yugoslav wars, inflation and political isolation. Because of it, pop-folk gained a bad reputation, becoming colloquially known as "turbo-folk", a term that was coined by musician Rambo Amadeus because of the influence electronic dance music had on this crossover genre during the 1990s. It was during this period when some of the best known names in pop-folk music, and Serbian commercial music in general, emerged, including Dragana Mirković, Stoja, Dragan Kojic Keba, Ceca, Aca Lukas and Jelena Karleuša.

Even after the downfall of Milošević, pop-folk continued to stay popular. In the 2000s Serbian record label Grand Production gathered most of the country's pop-folk performers, such as Indira Radić, Saša Matić, Seka Aleksić, Đani and Dara Bubamara. Their televised singing contest, called Zvezde Granda, also brought a new generation of singers, which includes Tanja Savić, Milica Todorović, Rada Manojlović, Milan Stanković, Milica Pavlović, Aleksandra Prijović and Tea Tairović.

=== Jazz ===
Jazz in Serbia appears in the 1920s when Markus Blam formed first jazz orchestra Studentski Micky Jazz. Jazz music was played mostly in salons and clubs, but it is also known that jazz orchestras toured in spas over Serbia. This style of music has been present on the radio as well as in specialized magazines. Radio Belgrade started to work in 1929, every night after 22:30h Radio Jazz Orchestra played popular songs. First jazz society in Serbia was set up in 1953, but to the development of jazz the most contributed hosting famous musicians, among whom was Louis Armstrong in 1959 and 1960. The first Serbian musicians to rise to international fame were Mladen Guteša who worked for famous musicians such as Lee Konitz, Benny Goodman and others and Duško Gojković. These two entered The 1956 Encyclopedia Yearbook of Jazz of Leonard Feather. Other prominent names of Serbian jazz include Bora Roković who composed jazz suite The Human Piano, Mihailo Živanović, Branislav Kovačev, Branko Pejaković, Milan Lulić, Boris Jojić, Jovan Miković and others. Among the most popular singers of jazz and blues in Serbia was Šaban Bajramović known as King of Romani music, who was included in the Time magazines list of top 10 blues singers in the world. Vladan Mijatovic (Jazz pianist) is the young ambassador of the Serbian Jazz music in North America.

=== Hip-hop ===
Serbian hip hop emerged in the early 80s among the b-boy crews. The first Serbian Hip Hop record release was the Degout EP by The Master Scratch Band, which was released by Jugoton in 1984. However, Serbian hip-hop scene wasn't developed until the late 90s when hip-hop groups started to break out from the underground. Best known rappers and hip-hop collectives include Gru, Sunshine, Bad Copy, Beogradski sindikat and Marčelo. Artists such as Elitni Odredi, Rasta and Coby reached mainstream success by switching to more commercial sound and appealing to the wider audience. Some of the more prominent female performers include Mimi Mercedez and Sajsi MC. Bassivity and later Bassivity Digital have been the biggest regional hip-hop recording labels.

=== Other ===
In a review of Konstrakta's song "In corpore sano", Petar Popović considered her a performer that "is rising above the existing genres and offering a different universe". Her musical work earned her the title of the "Nedeljnik Person of the Year".

== Festivals ==
Exit is a summer music festival which is held at the Petrovaradin Fortress in the city of Novi Sad, officially proclaimed as the "Best Major European Festival" at the EU Festival Awards. Other festivals include Belgrade Beer Fest in Belgrade, Gitarijada in Zaječar, Nišville in Niš and Guča Trumpet Festival in Guča.

In the town of Guča, near the city of Čačak is an annually held brass band festival called Guča trumpet festival in the Dragačevo region of western Serbia with 600,000 visitors per year. Other popular festivals include Rock festivals Belgrade Beer Fest and Gitarijada, and Jazz festival Nišville.

== Eurovision Song Contest ==
Serbia debuted at Eurovision as an independent country in 2007, being represented by Marija Šerifović with the song "Molitva", winning on its first ever appearance. Other notable results include a 3rd place in 2012, being represented by Željko Joksimović with the song "Nije ljubav stvar" and 5th in 2022, being represented by Konstrakta with the song "In corpore sano". Luke Black represented Serbia with the song "Samo mi se spava" in 2023, after that he became one of the most productive artists among other Eurovision contestants this year releasing an album "Chainsaws in Paradise" in 2024.

== See also ==
- List of best-selling albums in Serbia
- Music of Southeastern Europe
- Music of Yugoslavia

== Sources ==
- Burton, Kim. "Balkan Beats". 2000. In Broughton, Simon and Ellingham, Mark with McConnachie, James and Duane, Orla (Ed.), World Music, Vol. 1: Africa, Europe and the Middle East, pp 273–276. Rough Guides Ltd, Penguin Books. ISBN 1-85828-636-0
- Đurić-Klajn, Stana (1972). A Survey of Serbian Music Through the Ages. Belgrade: Association of Composers of Serbia.
- Hudson, Robert. "Songs of seduction: popular music and Serbian nationalism." Patterns of prejudice 37.2 (2003): 57–176.
- Jakovljević, Andrija (1984). "Musical Works of Serbian Composers Stefan and Nikola the Serb from 14th C - Bilingual Anthology of Great Laura (E-108)" (PDF). Balcanica (15): 69–82.
- Milošević-Đorđević, Nada (1995). "The Oral Tradition". The History of Serbian Culture. Edgware: Porthill Publishers. pp. 147–163. Archived from the original on 2018-02-23.
- Pejović, Roksanda (1995a). "Medieval Music". The History of Serbian Culture. Edgware: Porthill Publishers. pp. 133–136. Archived from the original on 2018-04-10.
- Pejović, Roksanda (1995b). "Musical Composition and Performance from the Eighteenth Century to the Present". The History of Serbian Culture. Edgware: Porthill Publishers. pp. 243–254.
- Pejović, Roksanda (2013). Musical Instruments in Medieval Serbia. Belgrade: University of Arts.
