= Aleksandar Sofronijević =

Serbian accordion player

- Born: 19 November 1983 (age 43); Kraljevo, Serbia
- Other name: Sofra
- Occupations: Accordionist, music producer
- Years active: 2003–present

Aleksandar Sofronijević (Serbian Cyrillic: Александар Софронијевић; born 19 November 1983) is a Serbian accordion player, music producer and leader of his own orchestra, the Orchestra of Aleksandar Sofronijević.

== Life ==
Born and grown up in Kraljevo, Serbia, he lived his childhood with his parents (Radovan Sofronijević and Milena) and his sister Aleksandra. No one in his family was professionally engaged in music, but his parents loved watching music shows with traditional Serbian songs.

Sofronijević got his first accordion at the age of 4 and started to attend private music classes, because his parents noticed the passion that he had for music. He continued playing the accordion in elementary and secondary school, and during school breaks he often played with his classmates, whenever he had an accordion handy. After finishing secondary school, he decided to dedicate his life and future entirely to music, and moved to the city of Kragujevac, where he was enrolled in the Academy of Music and became a professional accordionist by finishing his studies.

Sofronijević has a healthy lifestyle and his daily routine includes training and swim sessions and a healthy diet. His main hobby is cycling provided by the fact that during the summer he often participates in local cycling races and marathons, which last for several days.

== Career ==
At the age of 16, he participated in the youth competition for accordionists in Sokobanja, where he won the contest after a stunning performance. Two years later, at the age of 18 and playing on the same accordion, he won the contest again, but now in the senior competition, being the youngest one who achieved this honor. This great success gave him the idea to form his own orchestra and thus create a true vision of his musical career.

Saša Popović believed in the success of Sofronijević and gave him and his orchestra the chance to be an integral part of numerous shows at Grand Production. The first TV show at Grand Production, where he showed his musical talent, was Narod Pita – a show where famous singers from Serbia performed live music.

In 2015 Grand Production started a new talent show where Sofronijević together with his orchestra gained prominence. Nikad nije kasno (translation: It's never too late) is a competition of veteran singers (older than 40 years), who perform the greatest pop and folk music hits and thus have the opportunity to show themselves to an audience of millions of people. The candidates and invited famous artists, who are members of the jury, were all accompanied by Sofronijević and his orchestra until 2022, when the contract with the music show expired. During the show Aleksandar recorded more than 4000 songs and played them in a new special arrangement.

Sofronijević's first major performance was in Belgrade with Ana Bekuta. Following this, he has performed globally with Željko Joksimović, Marija Šerifović, Lepa Brena, Šaban Šaulić, Zdravko Čolić among other artists.

Beyond live performances, Sofronijević produces soundtracks for movies and TV series. Sofronijević and his orchestra live recorded the soundtrack for the film Toma, which illustrates the life of folk music singer Toma Zdravković. He also played Nemam više nikoga, composed by Aleksandra Kovač, for the TV series Ubice moga oca, and for Saša Matić the song Čujem da se ovih dana razvodiš, composed by Saša Milošević.

== Music studio ==
In 2021 Sofronijević opened his own music studio in Belgrade, called AS Studioton. It has a modern design and devices from the latest generation which create a balance between the older analog and newer digital technology. It offers complete music production, including record and sound processing of vocal and instrumental content. Sofronijević stated that he invested all his earnings from music at the time in order to complete the building of the studio.
