= Mira Škorić =

- Born: Mirjana Škorić; 8 July 1970 (age 56); Belgrade, SFR Yugoslavia
- Genres: Pop-folk
- Occupations: Singer; TV personality
- Instrument: Voice
- Years active: 1988–present
- Labels: Diskos; PGP-RTS; Grand Production; City Records

Mirjana Škorić (Serbian Cyrillic: Мирјана Шкорић; born 8 July 1970), better known as Mira Škorić, is a Serbian singer. She made her recording debut with the album Niko kao mi in 1988. Škorić has worked with singers such as Ceca, Lepa Brena, Vesna Zmijanac, Aca Lukas, Željko Bebek and Ana Bekuta. She has received various music accolades, including the Life Achievement Award from the Union of Serbia's Music Artists (SEMUS) in 2019.

In October 2019, Škorić marked over three decades of her career with a solo concert in the Sava Centar, Belgrade.

In addition to her career in music, she has appeared on the television shows Veliki Brat VIP All Stars (2009), Parovi (2015) and Tvoje lice zvuči poznato (2017).

Škorić has a daughter, named Milica, whom she raised as a single parent.

== Discography ==
Studio albums

- Niko kao mi (1988)
- Mi možemo sve (1989)
- Oči moje ponosite (1991)
- Imam želju (1992)
- Ti si ko i ja (1993)
- Rodiću ti sina (1995)
- U službi ljubavi (1996)
- Kosa crna (1997)
- Srcekradica (1998)
- 10 (2000)
- Kafano! (2001)
- Još uvek te volim (2003)
- Najbolji prijatelji (2005)
- Za moj rođendan (2013)

== Music festivals ==
- Grand Festival 2006; 3rd place with "Ista nam je tuga"
- Beovizija 2007; 11th place with "Voli je"
- Grand Festival 2008; with "Tako si pao"
- Pink Music Festival 2011; 6th place with "Srce sa kvarom"

== Filmography ==
List of appearances of Mira Škorić on television
Year	Title	Genre	Notes
2009	Veliki Brat VIP All Stars	Television	5th place
2015	Parovi	Television	Season 4, ejected
2017	Tvoje lice zvuči poznato	Television	season 4, 9th place
2018–2021	Zvezde Granda	Television	Jelena Karleuša's assistant mentor
