= Mirče Radulović =

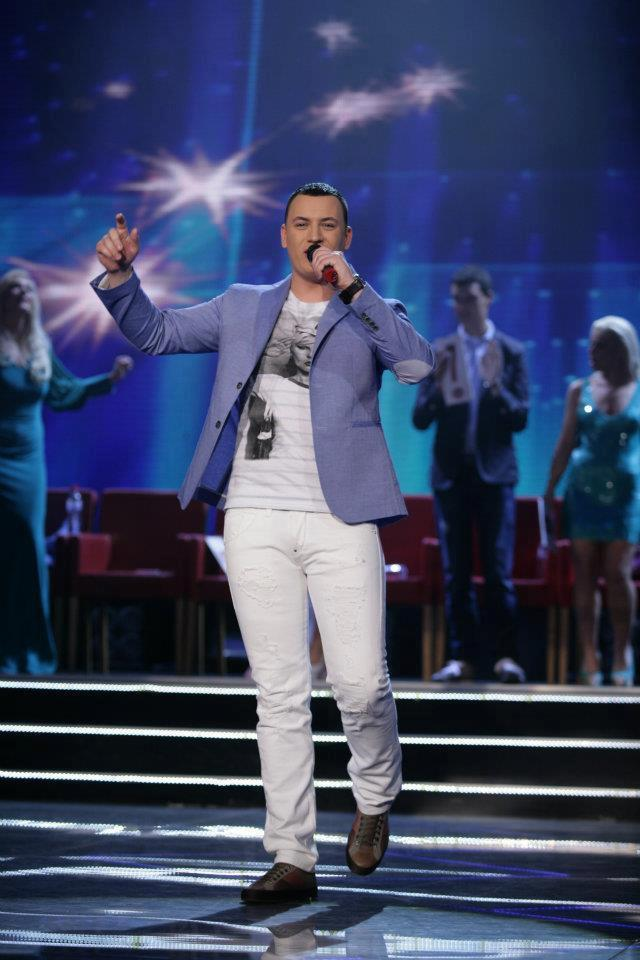
- Performing at Zvezde Granda in 2012

Background information
- Born: Miroslav Radulović; May 20, 1992 (age 34); Kruševac, Serbia, FR Yugoslavia
- Origin: Trstenik, Serbia
- Genres: Pop-Folk, Turbo-folk
- Occupation: Singer
- Years active: 2007–present
- Label: Grand Production
- Website: mirceradulovic.com

Miroslav Radulović, better known as Mirče (Serbian Cyrillic: Мирослав Радуловић Мирче) (born May 20, 1992, in Kruševac, Serbia) is a Serbian pop-folk singer.

He competed in the 2011–12 season of the televised singing contest Zvezde Granda. He finished in 4th place but was signed to the record label Grand Production. His single "Njeno" premiered on June 30, 2012. After a long break, he released song "Placite oci moje" in 2016.

== Discography ==
=== Singles ===
- Fatalna (2009)
- Njeno (2012)
- Placite oci moje (2016)
