= Matović =

Matović (Cyrillic script: Матовић) is a Serbian patronymic surname. Notable people with the surname include:

- Darjan Matović (born 1988), Bosnian goalkeeper
- Dušan Matović (born 1983), Serbian footballer
- Ivana Matović (born 1983), Serbian basketball player
- Vera Matović (born 1946), Serbian singer
- Igor Matovič (born 1973), Slovak politician, former Prime Minister of Slovakia
