= Grand Production =

- Parent company: United Group
- Founded: 3 December 1998
- Founder: Lepa Brena; Saša Popović; Slobodan Živojinović
- Genre: Balkan folk; pop-folk; turbo-folk
- Country of origin: Serbia
- Location: Danila Lekića 31, Belgrade
- Official website: www.grand.online

Grand Production (Serbian: Гранд продукција / Grand produkcija) is a Serbian record label and production company predominantly focused on folk performers. The label produces the weekly television show Grand Parada, launched their own cable television channel, and organize a competitive festival of pop-folk and turbo-folk music, Grand Festival.

== TV shows ==
Since its founding in 1998, the label has produced the weekly television variety show Grand Parada (or Zvezda Granda), to serve as a showcase for Grand Production's artists. It aired on the Serbian network Pink TV until 2014, when Grand launched their own cable channel, Grand TV, through a contract with United Group. They have a full programming schedule, and also air shows on Prva Srpska Televizija in Serbia and Montenegro, Nova BH in Bosnia and Herzegovina, and on Kanal 5 in North Macedonia. Grand TV is also available in Europe, Canada, United States and Australia.

The list of Grand Production programs:

- Grand Show
- Grand Parada
- Grand Stars
- Grand Stars Special, formerly Grand Stars – people ask
- Fantastic Show
- Grand Magazine

== Grand Festival ==
The label organizes this competitive festival of pop-folk and turbo-folk music. Grand Festival runs over multiple evenings, and in 2008 had two semi-finals with the top 12 acts from each advancing to a final show. The audience and a jury vote for the winners, who receive cash prizes.

== Artists ==
Artists currently signed to Grand:

- Aca Lukas (2000, 2006–2010, 2013–present)
- Aco Pejović (2006–present)
- Aleksandar Sofronijević (2010–present)
- Aleksandra Prijović (2013–present)
- Ana Bekuta (1999–present)
- Ana Kokić (2006–present)
- Anabela Atijas (2016–present)
- Bane Mojićević (2004–present)
- Bora Drljača (1999–2020)
- Branka Sovrlić (2002, 2016–present)
- Dado Polumenta (2005, 2010–2013, 2017–present)
- Darko Filipović (2004–present)
- Darko Lazić (2009–present)
- Dejan Matić (2002–present)
- Dragan Kojić Keba (2004–2011, 2013–present)
- Džej (2005–2020)
- Đani (2000–2008, 2012–present)
- Đogani (2016–present)
- Enes Begović (2002–present)
- Goca Božinovska (1998–present)
- Grupa Luna (2014–present)
- Halid Muslimović (2001–present)
- Indira Radić (2000–2015, 2017–present)
- Ivana Selakov (2010–present)
- Jana (1999–2003, 2011–present)
- Jašar Ahmedovski (2000–2005, 2014–present)
- Jelena Karleuša (1999, 2015–present)
- Jovan Stefanović (2009–present)
- Katarina Grujić (2013–present)
- Katarina Živković (2007–present)
- Lepa Brena (1998–present)
- Lepa Lukić (2006–present)
- Ljuba Aličić (2013–present)
- Maja Marijana (1999, 2003–2009, 2015–present)
- Marija Šerifović (2015–present)
- Marina Tadić (2015–present)
- Marinko Rokvić (2000–2021)
- Milan Mitrović (2011–present)
- Mia Borisavljević (2008–2010, 2014–present)
- Mile Kitić (1998–2024)
- Milica Pavlović (2012–present)
- Milica Todorović (2005–present)
- Miloš Bojanić (2000–2006, 2012–present)
- Mina Kostić (2005–present)
- Mira Škorić (2001–present)
- Mitar Mirić (2000–2009, 2013–present)
- Merima Njegomir (2001–2002, 2015–2021)
- Nada Topčagić (2004–present)
- Nataša Đorđević (1998–2005, 2008–present)
- Neda Ukraden (2001–2008, 2013–present)
- Nemanja Stevanović (2007–2010, 2013–present)
- Novica Zdravković (2000–present)
- Osman Hadžić (2014–present)
- Osvajači (1999–2001, 2015–present)
- Predrag Živković Tozovac (2002–2021)
- Rada Manojlović (2007–present)
- Romana Panić (2015–present)
- Snežana Đurišić (2003–present)
- Sanja Đorđević (1999–present)
- Saša Matić (2001–2003, 2005–present)
- Sejo Kalač (2003–2007, 2015–present)
- Snežana Babić Sneki (2004–present)
- Stoja (1999–2010, 2017–present)
- Suzana Jovanović (1999–present)
- Šako Polumenta (1999, 2015–present)
- Šeki Turković (1999–2004, 2013–present)
- Tina Ivanović (2004–present)
- Verica Šerifović (1998–2005, 2008–present)
- Vesna Zmijanac (2003–2011, 2013–present)
- Viki Miljković (2001–2011, 2016–present)
- Zlata Petrović (2001–2007, 2010–present)

Artists previously signed to Grand:

- Al Dino (2007–2009)
- Boki Milošević (1999–2010)
- Ceca (2001)
- Dara Bubamara (2003–2009, 2014–2016)
- Dragana Mirković (1992-1993, 1999)
- Donna Ares (2006–2008)
- Goga Sekulić (2006–2010)
- Goran Vukošić (1999)
- Haris Džinović (2000)
- Jadranka Barjaktarović (2005–2016)
- Kemal Monteno (2007–2014)
- Marina Živković (2002)
- Marta Savić (1999–2007)
- Maya Berović (2007)
- Milan Stanković (2007–2010)
- Milena Plavšić (2000–2005)
- Nikola Rokvić (2006–2013)
- Predrag Gojković Cune (2000–2002)
- Sanja Maletić (2001)
- Saška Karan (2001)
- Seka Aleksić (2002–2015)
- Selma Bajrami (2001, 2007–2010)
- Suzana Mančić (2004)
- Šaban Šaulić (1999–2016)
- Šemsa Suljaković (2000)
- Tanja Savić (2004–2016)
- Zoran Vanev (2003–2005)
- Zorica Brunclik (2010–2015)
- Željko Samardžić (1999)
- Željko Šašić (1999, 2003–2013)
- Željko Joksimović (2014–2015)
