= Saša Popović =

Serbian musician and television personality

Saša Popović Саша Поповић

Background information
- Born: Aleksandar Popović; 24 April 1954; Novi Sad, SR Serbia, Yugoslavia
- Died: 1 March 2025 (aged 70) Paris, France
- Genre: Pop-folk
- Occupations: Musician; businessman; TV personality
- Instrument: Accordion
- Years active: 1977–2025
- Labels: ZaM; Grand Production
- Formerly of: Slatki greh
- Spouse: Suzana Jovanović (m. 1998)

Aleksandar Popović (Serbian Cyrillic: Александар Саша Поповић; 24 April 1954 – 1 March 2025) was a Serbian businessman, entrepreneur, musician and TV personality, best known for his time in Slatki greh and for creating the popular Balkan competition show Zvezde Granda.

Popović was one of the most prominent people in the Balkan music scene, arguably shaping numerous careers of prominent musicians in the Ex-Yugoslav scene. He has founded the Grand Production label together with Lepa Brena and Slobodan Živojinović.

== Early life ==
Popović was born on 24 April 1954 in Novi Sad, which was then part of Socialist Federal Republic of Yugoslavia. He spent most of his youth there, after which he moved to Belgrade in 1996. He lived with his grandparents, parents, and sister who was five years older than him in a parish home next to a church where his grandfather served. At one point, Popović trained with the FK Vojvodina. His father, Konstantin, was a multi-instrumentalist and singer on Radio Vojvodina, which is why he wanted his heir to enter the world of music and start playing the accordion. He began attending a musical academy in 1964. His father would later die in a car crash when he was 24.

== Career ==
=== Early career ===
In 1977, Popović founded the folk music band Lira šou. Four years later, in 1980, Lepa Brena joined his orchestra. Thanks to Milutin Popović Zahar and the song "Čačak, Čačak", they attracted great attention from the audience. When Lepa Brena became the singer in the band, it changed its name to Slatki greh in 1982. After the breakup of Slatki greh, Popović and his manager Raka Đokić began working on discography under the ZAM production company, for which many famous folk singers record their albums.

After the breakup of the band Slatki greh, Saša Popović took a year-long break from music. In 1992, he marked his return to the music scene with the solo album, Jezda i Dafina.The album contains ten songs, including a duet with Zlata Petrović called "Da smo hteli mi". He found inspiration for the title track "Jezda i Dafina" in his personal financial loss during the scandal with Dafiment banka, where he lost a significant amount of money. The following year, in 1993, Popović recorded an album with Zlaja banda, which contained eight songs. Among them are "Otkidam" and "Horoskop". Popović composed the music for most of the songs on this album himself, while Miladin Bogosavljević and Milan Vasić wrote the lyrics. The third album, Giljam dade, was released in 1994, also under the label of the Production House ZAM. The title song is performed with singers Beki Bekić and Nenad Knežević Knez. The album contains eight more songs, including "Drina" and "Čaše lomim".

Popović found another band, Medeni kolači, in 1995. This album features the title song, which he performed with Dragan Kojić Keba and Rođa Raičević, and the album also includes covers of popular songs such as "Ti meni lažeš sve" (lit. 'You Lie Everything to Me') and "Na kraj sela čađava mehana" (lit. 'A Sooty Tavern at the End of the Village').

=== Grand Production and Zvezde Granda ===
After working in ZAM, Popović and Lepa Brena founded Grand Production. The first episode of Grand Show was broadcast on Pink TV on 3 December 1998, which was considered the date of the company's founding. The series has launched the careers of numerous singers from the Former Yugoslavia, including Tanja Savić, Milica Todorović, Rada Manojlović, Milan Stanković, Darko Lazić, Milica Pavlović, Aleksandra Prijović, Tea Tairović, Teodora Džehverović, and Džejla Ramović.

Popović has been a member of the jury from the beginning until his death in 2025, including the auditions and the competition itself. From 2014 until 2021, he has been a member of the production jury together with singer Snežana Đurišić. The jury members change from season to season. Popović was also the host of Zvezde Granda: Specijal.

In April 2014, Popović launched Grand TV, which broadcasts its program via cable operators in Serbia and the region. This television station broadcasts shows such as Grand Magazin, Grand Koktel, Hello, Hello, Paparazzo, Neki novi klinci, Pres Pretres, and Nikad nije kasno.

== Health issues and death ==
In May 2024, Popović suffered an accident in which he broke his right leg. After the accident, doctors noticed that the wound was not healing well. Upon further examinations, Popović was diagnosed with stomach and pancreatic cancer, after which he was treated for several months at an oncology clinic in Paris.

In early 2025, his condition deteriorated badly after metastases to his bones and lungs. He died on 1 March 2025 in Paris from pancreatic cancer. His funeral was held on 6 March 2025 at the Bežanijska Cemetery in Belgrade, and was attended by many of his colleagues, including Haris Džinović, Nikola Rokvić and Marija Šerifović.

== Discography ==
- Sve sam pare popio (1992)
- Otkidam (1993)
- Giljam dade (1994)
- Medeni kolači (1995)
