= Suzana Jovanović =

Serbian singer (born 1969)

Suzana Jovanović Сузана Јовановић
- Born: 1 November 1969 (age 56)
- Origin: Radinac, SR Serbia, Yugoslavia
- Occupation: Singer
- Years active: 1992–present
- Labels: Grand Production
- Spouse: Saša Popović (m. 1998; died 2025)

Suzana Jovanović (Serbian Cyrillic: Сузана Јовановић; born 1 November 1969) is a Serbian pop-folk singer.

== Biography ==
Jovanović started singing in 1994 when she released her first album Poslaću ti ljubav (lit. 'I'll Send You Love') for Juvekomerc. However, her first hits such as "Plakala bih i bez suza", "Džabe care", "Didarla" and "Sokole" were released during the end of the 1990s and the beginning of the 2000s. She recorded several successful duets with artists such as Jašar Ahmedovski, as well as being a back-up vocalist together with Nataša Đorđević for another Serbian singer, Stojanka Novaković. She was married to Saša Popović, the co-owner of Grand Production, until his death in 2025.

== Discography ==
=== Albums ===
- Nekad si mi bio nada (1992)
- Rođeni u pravo vreme (1994)
- Poslaću ti ljubav (1995)
- Ko me jednom prevari (1996)

=== Singles ===
- "Plakala bih i bez suza" (1997)
- "Didarla" (1998)
- "Prsten sudbine" (1999)
- "Blago za robiju" (2001)
- "Ne izlazi sunce zbog tebe" (2002)
- "Ludilo" (2010)
