= Tina Ivanović =

Tina Ivanović Тина Ивановић
- Born: Radmila Ivanović; 28 September 1973 (age 52); Kosovska Kamenica, SR Serbia, SFR Yugoslavia
- Genres: Turbo-folk
- Occupation: Singer
- Years active: 1998–present
- Label: Grand Production

Radmila "Tina" Ivanović (Serbian Cyrillic: Радмила "Тина" Ивановић; born 28 September 1973) is a Serbian turbo-folk singer. Born in Kosovska Kamenica, at fourteen years of age she won Prvi glas pomoravlja singing festival in Batočina. Ivanović started her recording career in 1998, but gained popularity upon releasing her third album under Grand Production in 2004.

Tina appeared in the third series of reality show Farma in 2010, but eventually decided to voluntarily leave the competition.

== Discography ==
Studio album

- Lutalica (1998)
- Zavodnica (2000)
- Bunda od nerca (2004)
- Extra (2006)
- Miris Ljubavi (2008)

== See also ==
- Music of Serbia
- List of singers from Serbia
- Turbo-folk
