= Sanja Maletić =

Bosnian-born Serbian pop-folk singer (born 1973)

- Born: 27 April 1973 (age 52); Tuzla, SR Bosnia and Herzegovina, Yugoslavia
- Occupation: singer
- Years active: 1998–present
- Musical career
- Genres: pop folk; folk; pop
- Instrument: vocals
- Labels: Juvekomerc; Grand Production; Gold Music; VIP Production; BN Music

Sanja Maletić (Serbian Cyrillic: Сања Малетић; born 27 April 1973) is a bosnian-serbian pop-folk singer.

== Music career ==
Sanja began her music career in the end of 1998.

== Personal life ==
Maletić was born into an ethnic Serb family in Tuzla, SR Bosnia and Herzegovina, Yugoslavia. Her father died in April 2012. She said of herself "I am a real Bosnian, loving strong and high-calorie food" and that her vice is "cigarettes and a good book"; her favourite book being Meša Selimović's Death and the Dervish.

She has apartments in Belgrade, Serbia and her hometown Tuzla.

== Discography ==
- Kani suzo (1998)
- Snegovi (2001)
- Ruzmarin (2002)
- Amajlija (2004)
- Noć u mojoj sobi (2006)
- Golden Girl (2010)
