= Darko Filipović =

- Birth name: Darko Filipović
- Born: 21 February 1981 (age 44)
- Origin: Leskovac, Serbia, then Yugoslavia
- Genres: Pop-folk
- Occupation: singer
- Years active: 2004–present
- Labels: Grand Production
- Website: Darko Filipović

Darko Filipović (Serbian: Дарко Филиповић; born 21 February 1981) is a Serbian turbo-folk singer born in Leskovac, south Serbia, who became famous after becoming a finalist in the first season of the music show Zvezde Granda in 2004. Filipović grew up in Leskovac, Serbia, and lived there until 2003, when he moved to Belgrade. Before competing in Zvezde Granda, Filipović was singing at typical Serbian night clubs on water called "Splavovi". His success in the competition Zvezde Granda gave him a lot of fame and attention from people from former Yugoslavia. His most famous song is his debut single "Ona Ona". Filipović is currently signed with the record label Grand Production.

== Discography ==
=== Albums ===
- Darko Filipović (Grand Production; 2004)
- Darko Filipović (Grand Production; 2007)

=== Singles ===
- Ljuljaju se splavovi (2006)
- Sad znam (2008 )
