= Pomaranča =

Slovenian and Yugoslav heavy metal band

Background information
- Origin: Ljubljana, Slovenia
- Genres: Heavy metal; hard rock
- Years active: 1979–1986; 1990–1995; 2024–2025 (Reunions: 1988, 2001, 2019)
- Labels: PGP-RTB, Pan Records, Panika Records, Nika
- Past members: Miloje Popovič; Zlatko Magdalenič; Marko Herak; Tomaž Žontar; Franc Teropšič; Šefik Kardumović; Roman Škraba; Boris Krmac; Matic Nareks; Tilen Hudrap; Matjaž Winkler

Pomaranča (trans. Orange), signed as Orange on their English language releases, was a Slovenian and Yugoslav heavy metal band formed in Ljubljana in 1979. Releasing three studio albums during their original 1979–1986 run, the band was one of the most notable acts of the Yugoslav heavy metal scene. The group reunited at the beginning of the 1990s, recording one more studio album and disbanding shortly afterwards. In the following years, the band had several one-off reunions, making another full-scale comeback in 2024, but ending their activity soon after, following the death of the band's guitarist and leader Miloje "Mijo" Popovič.

== History ==
Pomaranča was formed in 1979 by Miloje "Mijo" Popovič (guitar), Zlatko Magdalenič (vocals), Marko Herak (bass guitar), Tomaž Žontar (keyboards) and Franc Teropšič (drums). Popovič had previously led the band Trije Norci Tolčejo (Three Fools Knock), also known as TNT. Initially Pomaranča's sound was Deep Purple- and AC/DC-influenced, but later they turned towards NWOBHM-influenced sound, maintaining blues elements. The band chose their name after Anthony Burgess' novel A Clockwork Orange and Stanley Kubrick's film based on the book, and the band's future releases would feature several references to these works.

In 1980, the band's first release appeared, the 7-inch single with the songs "Soldat" ("Soldier") and "Mladost" ("Youth"), released through PGP-RTB. It was followed by two 7-inch singles released in 1981, the first featuring the songs "Alkohol" ("Alcohol") and "Gozba zla" ("The Feast of Evil"), and the second with the songs "Mleko z noži" ("Milk with Knives", the title referring to the drink served in the fictional Korova Milk Bar from A Clockwork Orange) and "Krvave čipke" ("Bloody Lace"). The band gained new attention of the public with their appearance at the 1981 Novi Rock (New Rock) festival in Ljubljana, where they demonstrated their attitude towards punk rock by hanging a mannequin representing a punk rocker.

In 1981, Pomaranča released their debut album, entitled Peklenska pomoranča (Hell Orange, a Slovenian language translation of the title A Clockwork Orange). The songs "Moli s kim si legla noćoj" ("Ask Who You Slept With Last Night") and "Pustite upanje, ki vstopate" ("Abandon All Hope, Ye Who Enter Here", the title referring to the inscription on the gate of Hell in Dante's Inferno) saw large radio play in the country. In 1982, the band performed as the opening act on Gillan concert in Pionir Hall in Belgrade, and in 1983, they performed on a heavy metal festival in Zagreb headlined by Motörhead, Uriah Heep and Budgie.

In 1983, the band released their second studio album, the English language Madbringer, under the name Orange, in an attempt to break into the foreign market, but the album saw little international success. The album featured controversially titled songs "Honey Let Me Feel Your Pussy" and "Don't Stop I'm Stoned Again", as well as the song "Your Eyes Call Me Back to Tokyo", a result of the band's intention to apply for a heavy metal festival in Japan. In 1985, the band released their third studio album, Orange III, with both English and Slovenian language lyrics, in the new lineup, with Popovič on guitar, Herak on bass guitar, Šefik Kardumović "Šeki" (formerly of Quo Vadis) on vocals and Roman Škraba (formerly of Na Lepem Prijazni) on drums. Soon after the album release, in 1986, the group disbanded.

Pomaranča made a brief reunion in 1988, to hold a concert as a sign of support to arrested dissident and the future prime minister of Slovenia Janez Janša. The band reunited once again in 1990, appearing as the opening act on Alice Cooper concert in Zagreb. In 1993, the band released the compilation album Nekaj paklenskih (Some Hellish Ones), which featured their old songs, as well as previously unreleased recordings. In 1995, they released their fifth studio album, Takoj se dava dol (Instantly Coming Down), featuring the band's original drummer Franc Teropšič, and the new vocalist, Boris Krmac.

Although never officially announcing their disbandment, the band ended their activity once again in the second half of the 1990s, Popovič dedicating himself to composing children's music. Pomaranča would make occasional reunions during the following decades. In 2001, they performed on the Heavy Metal Night in the K4 club in Ljubljana. In 2019, they appeared on the Metaljot Raspaljot festival in Laško, with the new vocalist, Matic Nareks. The members of the band appeared in the 2017 documentary film Železne stopinje (Iron Footprints), produced by Denis Brnčić and directed and written by Dajnomir Gorjanec and dealing with the history of the Slovenian heavy metal scene.

Franc Teropšič died on 9 September 2022, and Marko Herak died on 31 October of the same year. In 2024, Mijo Popovič reformed Pomaranča, in the lineup featuring Tomas Žontar (keyboards), Matic Nareks (vocals), Tilen Hudrap (bass guitar) and Matjaž Winkler (drums). The new lineup released the single "Vse pesmi kličejo za njo" ("All the Songs Call for Her") and held a sold-out concert in Ljubljana's Kino Šiška. In June 2025, the band bid farewell to their former vocalist Boris Krmac, who died on June 2, and only three weeks later, on 24 June, Popovič died at the age of 67, Žontar announcing that Pomaranča has ceased to exist.

== Discography ==
=== Studio albums ===
- Peklenska pomaranča (1981)
- Madbringer (1983)
- Orange III (1985)
- Takoj se dava dol (1995)

=== Compilations ===
- Nekaj peklenskih (1993)

=== Singles ===
- "Soldat" / "Mladost" (1980)
- "Alkohol" / "Goba zla" (1981)
- "Mleko z noži" / "Krvave čipke" (1981)
- "Vse pesmi kličejo za njo" (2024)
