= Branislav Mojićević =

Serbian singer (born 1986)

Bane Mojićević
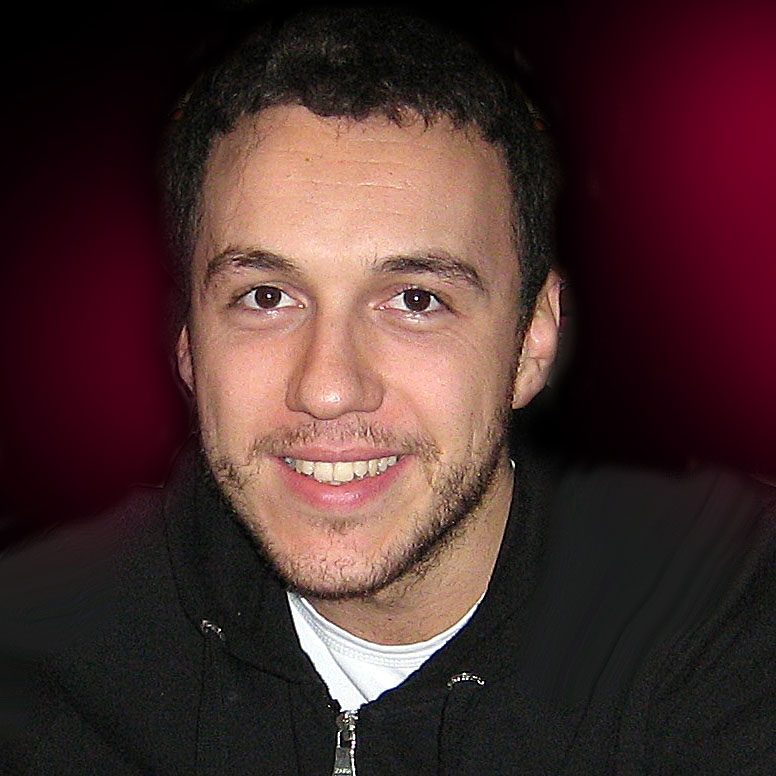

Background information
- Born: Branislav Mojićević; 20 August 1986 (age 39); Kraljevo, SR Serbia, SFR Yugoslavia
- Genres: Pop-folk
- Occupation: Singer
- Years active: 2003–present
- Label: Grand Production

Branislav Mojićević (Serbian Cyrillic: Бранислав Мојићевић; born 20 August 1986) is a Serbian singer. He rose to fame in 2004, after winning the first season of Zvezde Granda, which earned him a record deal with Grand Production.

In addition, Mojićević also won the second season of the Serbian version of Your Face Sounds Familiar in 2014.

He married Serbian bellydancer Milica Mićević in 2013.

== Discography ==
Studio albums

- Stara ljubav (2005)
- Zlato moje (2008)
