= Nišville =

Nišville Jazz Festival
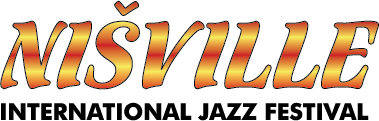
- Official logo
- Genre: Jazz, Soul, World music, Blues, Funk
- Dates: August
- Locations: Niš Fortress, Niš, Serbia
- Years active: 1995–present
- Founders: Ivan Blagojević
- Website: www.nisville.com

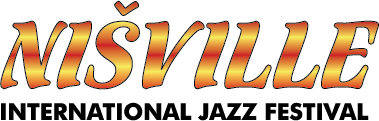
Nisville Jazz Festival logo

Nišville Jazz Festival is an international jazz festival held annually in Niš, Serbia. Founded in 1995, it has grown into one of the most prominent jazz festivals in Southeast Europe.

== History ==
Jazz festival traditions in Niš date back to the early 1980s. The modern Nišville was established in 1995 by cultural manager Ivan Blagojević. The first editions were held at the Army Club in Niš, and since 2006 the festival has taken place at the open-air stages of the Niš Fortress.

== Program ==
Nišville’s concept combines mainstream and traditional jazz with Balkan and world music influences. In addition to main stage concerts, the festival includes free outdoor programs, jam sessions, film screenings, workshops, and art exhibitions. Since 2006, performances have been held on multiple stages in and around the Fortress, with attendance reaching several thousand visitors per night.

== Artists ==
Over the years, Nišville has hosted many internationally recognized performers, including Solomon Burke, Joss Stone, Billy Cobham, Incognito, Candy Dulfer, Jean-Luc Ponty, Stanley Jordan, Ron Carter, Benny Golson, Randy Brecker, Roy Hargrove, Nouvelle Vague, De-Phazz, The Brand New Heavies, Osibisa, Duško Gojković, and Šaban Bajramović.

== Selected editions ==
Year	Headliners / Notable performers	Estimated attendance
1995	Local Serbian jazz ensembles (first edition)	1,000
2006	Candy Dulfer, Incognito	10,000
2010	Roy Hargrove, Randy Brecker	20,000
2014	Joss Stone, Billy Cobham	25,000
2016	Solomon Burke, Nouvelle Vague	30,000
2019	Jean-Luc Ponty, Ron Carter	40,000
2023	Stanley Jordan, De-Phazz	40,000+

== Recognition ==
The festival has been declared an event of national importance by the Serbian Ministry of Culture. The Guardian listed it among the top ten jazz festivals in the world. Nišville also awards an annual Lifetime Achievement Award to prominent jazz musicians from Serbia.
