= Duško Kuliš =

Bosnian folk singer and songwriter (born 1960)

- Born: Duško Kuliš; 7 February 1960 (age 66); Kreševo, SR Bosnia and Herzegovina
- Genres: Folk music, Pop-folk
- Occupation: Musician
- Instruments: Piano, accordion
- Years active: 1978–present

Duško Kuliš (born 7 February 1960) is a Croatian folk singer and songwriter from Bosnia and Herzegovina. He released his music mostly on Jugoton and its successor, Croatia Records. He is married and has two children.

== Discography ==
He released the following studio albums:

- "Nisu moje godine za tebe" (1983, Jugoton)
- "Priđi mi bliže" (1985, Jugoton)
- "Nemirna ljubav" (1987, Jugoton)
- "Kako ću bez tebe" (1988, Jugoton)
- "Ako jednom poželiš da odeš" (1990, Jugoton)
- "Ne zovi me u zoru" (1994)
- "Kaži nebo" (1995, Croatia Records)
- "Ne palite za mnom svijeću" (1996, Dammic)
- "Imaš li dušu" (1999, Croatia Records)
- "Megamix" (2000, Croatia Records)
- "SuperMegaMix" (2001, Croatia Records)
- "Umri muški" (2002)
- "SuperMegaMix" (2004, Croatia Records)
- "Otkopčano – Zakopčano" (2005, Croatia Records)
- "Eto pitaj pola grada" (2008, Croatia Records)
- "Nije srce na prodaju" (2009)
