= Branka Sovrlić =

Bosnian folk singer (born 1957)

Branka Sovrlić (born 1957 in Mostar, Yugoslavia) is a Bosnian and Serbian folk singer.

== Early life and education ==
Sovrlić's father served in the military, and during Sovrlić's childhood, the family moved first to Skopje, then to Niš, Serbia, when she was ten. She learned martial arts while attending high school in Niš. She later lived in Belgrade.

== Career ==
Sovrlić began her musical career in 1984, when she performed at the MESAM (International Music Fair) in Belgrade, singing Trebaš mi, "I need you". She also released her first album, Treba mi (I need), that year. She has recorded more than 15 albums. Her most notable hits are Bilo bi dobro (It would be good), A tebe nema (And you are gone), Lido Lido Lidija, and Nemoj da me moliš šta ti je (Don't ask me what's wrong with you). She also performed at the Belgrade International Music Fair in 1990 (with Lagao si, "You lied"), and in 1996 (with Volim te, "I love you"). As well as her singing, she was known for her long blonde hair and provocative dress style. In October 2011, she performed at the "Volim devedesete" (I love the Nineties) concert at the Štark Arena. Sovrlić is also a skilled interpreter of sevdalinka.

== Personal life ==
She has been married to restaurateur and former music producer Sadik Pašić Paja since 1984. Since the mid-2000s, they lived between Belgrade, Serbia and Sarajevo, Bosnia and Herzegovina, where they run two restaurants.

== Discography ==
- 1984 - Treba mi (I need)
- 1985 - Mazo moja
- 1986 - 100 godina (100 years)
- 1987 - I bez tebe živeti mogu (I can live without you)
- 1989 - Dođi još jednom (Come again)
- 1990 - Ti se ni boga ne bojiš (You are not afraid of god)
- 1991 - Ludo srce (Crazy heart)
- 1993 - Najdraži moj (My beloved)
- 1994 - Mazo mazo
- 1995 - Medu moj, šečeru (Honey and sugar)
- 1996 - Tebe nema (You're gone)
- 1998 - Crna vila (The black fairy)
- 2002 - Osveta (Revenge)
- 2005 - Opasna žena (Dangerous woman)
- 2011 - Urnebes
