= Vesna Zmijanac =

Serbian folk singer (born 1957)

Vesna Zmijanac Весна Змијанац
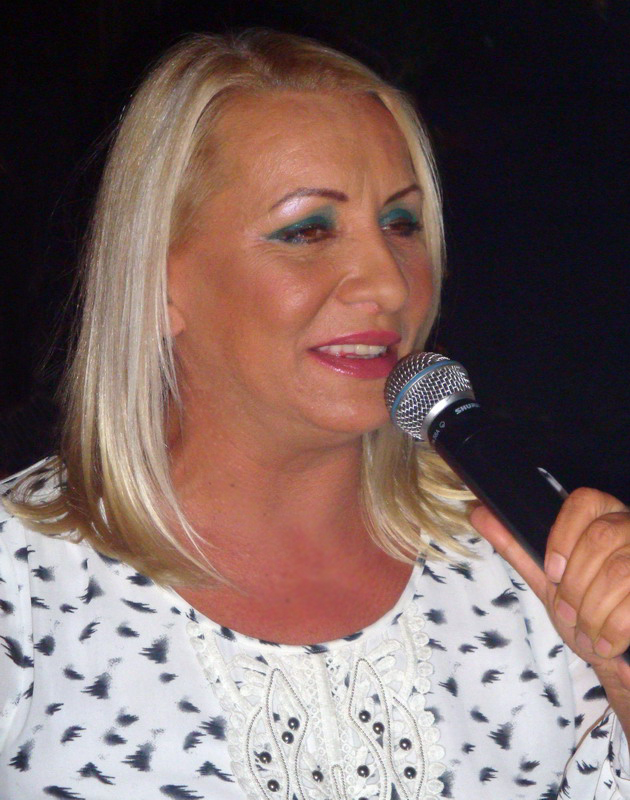
- Zmijanac performing in 2011

Background information
- Born: Vesna Zmijanac; 4 January 1957 (age 69); Nikšić, PR Montenegro, FPR Yugoslavia
- Genre: Folk
- Occupations: Singer; actress
- Instrument: Vocals
- Years active: 1975–present
- Labels: PGP-RTB; Komuna; Diskos; PGP-RTS; Grand Production

Vesna Zmijanac (Serbian Cyrillic: Весна Змијанац, pronounced [ʋêsna zmijǎːnats]; born 4 January 1957) is a Serbian singer. Having sold around 6.7 million records, Zmijanac is recognized as one of the most popular singers from the former Yugoslavia, and has also maintained popularity in neighboring Bulgaria.

Zmijanac made her recording debut in 1979 and is best known for hit songs "Nevera moja" (1975), "Kad zamirišu jorgovani" (1988), "Svatovi" (1990), "Idem preko zemlje Srbije" (1994) and "Malo po malo" (1995). Her emotional vocal delivery and melancholic ballads earned her the nickname "Queen of Sadness" (Kraljica tuge).

== Early life ==
Vesna Zmijanac was born on 4 January 1957 in Nikšić, PR Montenegro, FPR Yugoslavia to mother Kovina from Kraljevo, SR Serbia and father Dušan from Sisak, SR Croatia. Zmijanac's nationality is Serbian. Her parents divorced when she was just a year old. Subsequently, Zmijanac was raised by her maternal grandmother in the village of Kovače near Kraljevo because her parents moved abroad to work. Zmijanac also briefly lived in Vienna with her mother, where she attended high school, from which she eventually dropped out. She did, however, finish a typing course.

According to Zmijanac, she showed interest in music from an early age, citing folk singers Šaban Šaulić, Esma Redžepova, and Safet Isović as the biggest influences on her vocal performance.

== Career ==
While living in Vienna, Zmijanac was discovered by singer Šaban Šaulić, who offered her to join him on his European tour. Šaulić also helped her get signed by PGP-RTB, under which she released her first single "Hvala ti za sve" in 1979. Three years later, she starred in the movie Sok od šljiva, directed by Branko Baletić. Her first album, Ljubi me, ljubi, lepoto moja, was released in 1982. Zmijanac also made a cameo in the television series Kamiondžije ponovo voze in 1984.

During the early eighties, she started collaborating with Miroljub Aranđelović Kemiš, who wrote her first major hit "Nevera moja" (1975). Her fifth album, titled Dođi što pre, was released the following year, selling 400,000 copies. Same year, she won the main prize at the International Music Fair (MESAM) in Belgrade with the song "Kraj nogu ti mrem". The album was also followed with her first national tour. With this success Zmijanac became one of the most popular Yugoslav singers, only competing with Lepa Brena. The follow-up album, Jedini si ti, was sold in half a million copies. Her 1987 album, titled Istina, was sold in 850,000 copies, making it of one the best-selling albums in the former Yugoslavia. The album featured a popular duet with Dino Merlin, called "Kad zamirišu jorgovani". Zmijanac embarked on her second tour, performing at the Hala Pionir, Belgrade and Zetra Olympic Hall, Sarajevo to over 10,000 people. Other big hits of hers from this period include "Ne kunite crne oči" (1986), "Kunem ti se životom" (1987) and "Kazni me, kazni" (1988).

In 1990, Zmijanac released her eighth studio album, Svatovi, under new label Komuna, which was promoted with a tour and ten consecutive concerts at the Belgrade's Sava Centar. During the nineties, four more bodies of work were released, on which she collaborated with the likes of Momčilo Bajagić Bajaga and Rambo Amadeus. These albums include popular songs such as "Svatovi" (1990), "Idem preko zemlje Srbije" (1994), "Ja imam nekog, a ti si sam" (1994) featuring Slavko Banjac, "Malo po malo" (1995) and "Da budemo noćas zajedno" (1997).

In 2000, Zmijanac published a book, called Kad zamirišu jorgovani, which was described by her as "an attempt of an autobiography". In October 2010, she participated on Survivor Srbija VIP: Philippines alongside her daughter, Nikolija. Zmijanac was the second contestant to be eliminated on the show. Her final album to date, Sokol, was released in 2011 through PGP-RTS. Zmijanac competed on the seventh season of the reality television show Farma. She eventually voluntarily left the show after finding out about her daughter's pregnancy. In December 2019, Vesna Zmijanac was awarded with the Life Achievement Award from the Association of Music Artists of Serbia.

In October 2020, she was proclaimed the National Music Artist of Serbia at the Folk Music Assembly of Serbia. To celebrate fifty years of her career, Zmijanac held three cosecutive concerts at the Belgrade Arena in May 2026.

== Private life ==
In the 1980s, Zmijanac was married for three years to songwriter and instrumentalist Miroljub Aranđelović Kemiš; he later married singer Zorica Brunclik.

From her second marriage to economist and former PGP-RTS marketing chief Vlada Jovanović, she had a daughter, singer Nikolija Jovanović, on October 19, 1989.

Zmijanac endorsed President Aleksandar Vučić in the 2022 Serbian general election. During the March 2026 rally of Serbian Progressive Party, Zmijanac, who performed at the event, stated: "The president should be supported in any case. I have always been with the government. [ ... ] You should always be with the government, because then you don't have any problems". Her daughter Nikolija and son-in-law Relja Popović, on the other hand, participated in the 2025 student-led anti-government protests.

== Discography ==
Studio albums

- Ljubi me, ljubi, lepoto moja (1982)
- Ti mali (1983)
- Šta će meni šminka (1984)
- Zar bi me lako drugome dao (1985)
- Dođi što pre (1986)
- Jedan si ti (1987)
- Istina (1988)
- Svatovi (1990)
- Ako me umiriš sad (1992)
- Idem preko zemlje Srbije (1994)
- Malo po malo (1995)
- Posle svega, dobro sam (1997)
- Šta ostane kad padnu haljine (2003)
- Sokole (2011)

== Filmography ==
Filmography of Vesna Zmijanac
Year	Title	Genre	Role	Notes
1981	Sok od šljiva	Film	Kadivka	
1984	Kamiondžije opet voze	Television	Herself	1 episode
1994	Novogodišnja priča	Television	Herself	TV movie
2010	Survivor Srbija	Television	Herself	Season 3, 2nd eliminated
2016	Farma	Television	Herself	Season 7, walked on day 95

== Bibliography ==
Books

- Zmijanac, Vesna (2000). Kad zamirišu jorgovani : [pokušaj autobiografije]. Evro.

== See also ==
- Music of Serbia
- List of singers from Serbia
- Turbo-folk
