= Vera Matović =

Serbian folk singer (born 1946)

- Born: 3 June 1946 (age 79); Čačak, Serbia, Yugoslavia
- Genres: Folk
- Occupation: Singer
- Years active: 1974–present
- Labels: PGP-RTB, Diskoton, ZaM

Vera Matović (Serbian Cyrillic: Вера Матовић, born 3 June 1946 in Čačak) is a Serbian folk singer. Her career started in 1974 with the release of her first album, Pomiri se sudbinom; she has since released 26 albums and 13 singles. She finished Economical secondary school. During primary school, she sang with her brother's orchestra in Čačak. Her song "Miki, Milane" was garnering social media popularity due to NBA player Luka Doncic playing the song on his Instagram stories.

== Discography ==
- 1974 – Pomiri se sudbinom -
- 1975 – Sve ili ništa
- 1975 – Od nemila do nedraga
- 1976 – Skloni mi se s puta
- 1976 – U srcu sam te zaključala
- 1977 – Prekide se lanac sreće
- 1977 – Lepi Marijo
- 1978 – Nisi me na putu našao
- 1978 – Ne mogu da se odvojim od tebe
- 1979 – Nije greška već namera
- 1979 – Najdraži gost
- 1980 – Sačekaj me ljubavi
- 1981 – Belu bluzu suza kvasi
- 1981 – Zakuni se oko moje
- 1982 – Hajde da se budimo u dvoje
- 1983 – Javi se, javi
- 1984 – Po mojoj si volji
- 1985 – Ja znam lek za ostavljene
- 1986 – Halo, halo, gde ideš večeras
- 1987 – Samo jedan minut
- 1988 – Volim te k'o Boga
- 1989 – Volim te
- 1990 – Kriva sam
- 1991 – Živeli zaljubljeni
- 1992 – Ljuljaj me sudbino
- 1994 – Kakva je ovo godina
- 1995 – Ti si sve što znam
- 1997 – Čije su ono oči
- 1998 – 18 dana
- 2003 – Varaju me tvoje oči
- 2006 – Ljubavni virus
- 2009 – Miki Milane
- 2013 - Skockala se strina
- 2013 - Samo s'tobom lolo
- 2015 - Zapevajmo svi siroti i bogati
- 2015 - Imam 20 eura

== Filmography ==
- Kamiondžije 2 (1983)
- Sok od šljiva (1981)
