= Ipče Ahmedovski =

Serbian and Macedonian singer (1966–1994)

Background information
- Born: 6 January 1966; Lažani, SR Macedonia, SFR Yugoslavia
- Died: 30 July 1994 (aged 28) Šopići, Serbia, FR Yugoslavia
- Genres: Folk
- Instrument: Vocals
- Years active: 1986–1994
- Labels: Jugodisk, Diskos, Juvekomerc

Ejup "Ipče" Ahmedovski (Macedonian and Serbian Cyrillic: Ејуп "Ипче" Ахмедовски; 6 January 1966 – 30 July 1994) was a popular Serbian and Macedonian folk singer.

A younger brother of the folk singer Jašar Ahmedovski, Ipče frequently sang in his father's kafana before he eventually moved to Belgrade to launch his professional career. He recorded his first album Bila si devojčica godina mojih in 1986 with the composers Rade Vučković and Tomica Miljić. Later, he recorded several albums with another Serbian composer, Novica Urošević, achieving popularity in Serbia in the early nineties.

Ahmedovski died in a car crash in 1994 on Ibarska magistrala near Šopići, crashing his speeding Mercedes into a truck.

== Selected discography ==
- Bila si devojčica godina mojih (1986)
- Činio sam čuda (1990)
- Luda devojka (1991)
- Ciganske duše (1993)
