= Milena Plavšić =

Bosnian-born Serbian folk singer

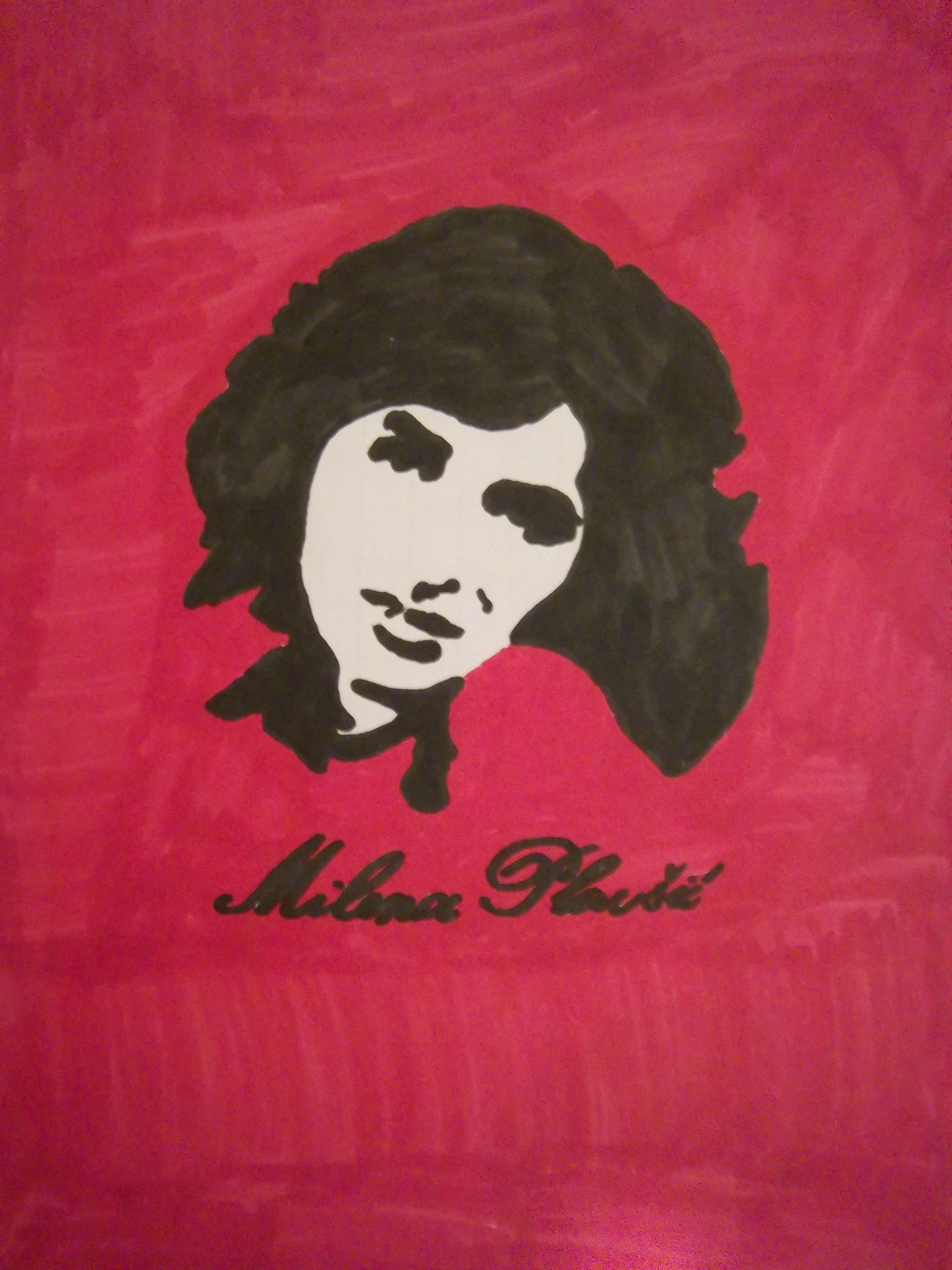

Background information
- Birth name: Milena Plavšić
- Born: Banja Luka, SFRY
- Genres: Folk
- Occupation: Singer-songwriter
- Years active: 1971–present

Milena Plavšić (Serbian Cyrillic: Милена Плавшић) is a Bosnian-born Serbian folk singer. Among her hits are "Ti ne znaš a ja te volim", "Pisma ću tvoja čuvati", "Ko će da me sakrije od kiše", "Jaka žena" and her interpretation of "Banja Luka".

== Biography ==
=== Early life ===
Plavšić was born into a poor, patriarchal, working family, in the vicinity of Banja Luka, Yugoslavia (modern Bosnia and Herzegovina). She spent her childhood in a mountain village three kilometers from Banja Luka, where she attended school. Although her parents opposed her becoming a singer, she pursued her dream.

=== Career ===
She began her professional career in 1981 when she released the song "Ti ne znaš a ja te volim" ("You do not know, but I love you"), written by famous boxer Marijan Beneš. The same year she released a slightly revised version of the popular song "Banja Luka", which became popular. In 1987 she won the annual showbiz award of the Socialist Republic of Serbia. Just before the start of the war in Yugoslavia, in 1991, she performed in Dvorana sportova, Zagreb, Croatia. In 1993/4, she held a large concert for the Serbian diaspora in Germany.

Her records are released by RTV BN.

== Personal life ==
Plavšić lost her parents and brother early in life, and was never able to conceive (have children). She dedicated the song "Poželi nam majko sreću" ("Mother, wish us luck") to her brother, and she dedicated the song "Jaka žena" ("Strong woman") to all her troubles in life.
