= Ana Bekuta =

Serbian singer (born 1959)

Ana Bekuta Ана Бекута
- Born: Nadežda Polić; 6 September 1959 (age 66); Priboj, PR Serbia, Yugoslavia
- Genres: Folk
- Occupations: Singer; TV personality
- Instruments: Vocals
- Years active: 1974–present
- Labels: PGP-RTB; Diskos; Grand Production
- Spouses: Aleksandar Savić; Predrag Vidović (div. 1992)
- Partner: Milutin Mrkonjić (2012–2021)

Nadežda Polić (Serbo-Croatian Cyrillic: Надежда Полић; born 6 September 1959), from 1985 Ana Bekuta (Serbian Cyrillic: Ана Бекута), is a Serbian singer. Born in Priboj, she made her performing debut in 1974 and is best known for hit songs like "Bekrija", "Crven konac", "Veseljak", "Zlatiborske zore" and "Kralj ponoći".

Bekuta has been a judge on the popular singing competition Zvezde Granda since 2014.

== Life and career ==
Nadežda – Nada Polić was born on September 6, 1959 and was raised in the village of Banja. She started performing professionally as a teenager. In 1974, Polić was the runner-up at the music festival Prvi glas Priboja (lit. 'The First Voice of Priboj'). Under the new name Ana Bekuta, she made her recording debut in 1985 with the release of her first album under PGP-RTB. Over the years, she has collectively released 21 studio albums. In 2011, Bekuta began performing annually at Belgrade's Sava Centar.

In 2014, she became a permanent judge on the television competition Zvezde Granda.

In 2020, SEMUS association of music artists of Serbia presented an award to Bekuta for her work.

In 2026, Bekuta performed at a Serbian New Year concert in Čačak, which sparked backlash and allegations of corruption for reportedly costing €40.000 from the city budget to organize. During the concert, gathered protestors booed Bekuta and threw snowballs at her, eventually forcing her to finish the concert singing from a van. A month later, on Serbia's Statehood Day, Bekuta was honored with a medal by President Aleksandar Vučić.

On Valentine's Day 2026, Bekuta celebrated forty years of her career with a concert at Arena Zagreb.

== Personal life ==
Bekuta had been married to keyboardist Aleksandar Savić for less than a year. Bekuta has a son, since her age of 17; they had lived with her husband—a drummer Predrag Vidović—in Šabac, until the parents' divorce in 1992 when they moved to Belgrade. She was in a relationship with Serbian politician Milutin Mrkonjić between 2012 and 2021, when he died.

== Discography ==
Studio albums

- Ti si mene varao (1985)
- Ti mi trebaš (1986)
- Samo ti (1987)
- Uvek postoji nada (1988)
- Kako mi je pitaš sad (1989)
- Tu sam ruku da ti pružim (1990)
- Pitaš kako živim (1993)
- Taj život moj (1995)
- Opet imam razloga da živim (1996)
- Sve je bolje od samoće (1998)
- Kriv si samo ti (1999)
- Svirajte mi onu pesmu (2001)
- Dve suze (2003)
- Brojanica (2005)
- Manite se ljudi (2006)
- Blago meni (2009)
- Hvala ljubavi (2013)
- Ime sreće (2018)
- Grešila sam (2023)
- I za vas, koji niste smeli (2023)

Singles

- "Ljubav bez adrese" (2009)
- "Morava se nije umorila" (2010)
- "Zakon ljubavi" (2010)
- "Opasna" (2014)
- "Guča" (2014)
- "Ništa ne obećavam" (2015)
- "Tvoja zauvek" (2016)
- "Balada o majci" (2017)
- "Kaži zbogom momačkom životu" (2019)
- "Kasno da se kajem" (2023)

Music videos

Title	Year	Directed by
Ti mi trebaš	1986	
Rano moja	1989	
Stani zoro	1989	
Zanele te noći	1991	
Nema povratka na staro	1991	
Srećan dan	1991	
Tu sam ruku da ti pružim	1991	
Ne žalim ja	1995	
Dugo te nije bilo	1995	
Idu putem dvoje ne govore	1995	
Gorim	1995	
Htela sam tebi biti žena	1995	
Taj život moj	1995	
Oluja	1995	Dejan Milićević
Zlatiborske zore	1996	
Zavoleh te	1996	Dejan Milićević
Kralj ponoći	1996	
Umri muški	1996	
Ma što baš ti	2003	
Opasna	2014	Goran Šljivić
Na izvoru Vidovdana	2015	Dejan Milićević
Uspomene	2017	Stanko Vučićević
Ime sreće	2017	Vedad Jašarević
Pređi na ljubav	2017	Vedad Jašarević
Neću se smiriti	2017	Vedad Jašarević
Moj si, neka se zna	2017	Vedad Jašarević
Metar	2017	Vedad Jašarević
Znam da te boli	2017	Vedad Jašarević
Zastani, živote	2017	Vedad Jašarević
Pođi pa na staro dođi	2017	Vedad Jašarević
Gram	2022	D. Šljivić
Kasno da se kajem	2023	Dejan Milićević
Bio si moj kralj	2023	David Mićić
Druga kafana	2023	
Kad bi opet	2025	
Grožđe	2026	Marko Arsić

== See also ==
- Music of Serbia
- Serbian folk music
