= Miloš Bojanić =

- Born: Miloš Bojanić; 16 October 1950 (age 75); Bijeljina, PR Bosnia and Herzegovina, FPR Yugoslavia
- Genres: Pop-folk, folk
- Years active: 1976–present

Miloš Bojanić (Serbo-Croatian Cyrillic: Милош Бојанић; born 16 October 1950) is a Bosnian Serb pop-folk singer, well known in former Yugoslavia where he has maintained a popularity throughout his 30-year-career.

== Personal life ==
Bojanić was born to a family of ethnic Bosnian Serbs in Ruhotina near Bijeljina, PR Bosnia and Herzegovina, FPR Yugoslavia.

He moved to Serbia at a young age. He has homes in Novi Sad (where he lives), Belgrade, and on the Montenegrin littoral.

His sons, Bane and Mikica, are singers as well. Bane lived in the US from 2002 to 2022.

== Reality television ==
He has also appeared in the second season of Farma (Serbian TV series) in 2010 and he won the show, earning the prize of 100,000 euros.

== Discography ==
- Hej mladosti ej živote (1984)
- Tako tako samo tako (1985)
- Oba srca kucaju ko jedno (1986)
- Zato što sam dobar bio (1986)
- Bosno moja jabuko u cvetu (1987)
- Otišo sam mlad a vraćam se sed (1988)
- Stara sreća na ljubav me seća (1988)
- Imala si sreće (1989)
- Volim te (1990)
- Preboleću (1992)
- Izdala si ljubav (1993)
- Dogodi se il ne dogodi (1994)
- Zmija u njedrima (1995)
- Digi digi daj (1996)
- Pade sneg na Đurđevdan (1997)
- Sanjam te (1998)
- Prijatelj samoće (2000)
- Gledam oči tvoje (2001)
- Još su žive one godine (2002)
- 20 godina sa vama (2004)
- Hajmo na noge (2006)

Awards and achievements
Preceded by Milan Topalović	Farma winner 2010 (2nd season)	Succeeded by Katarina Živković
