= Ljuba Aličić =

Serbian and Romany folk singer (born 1955)

- Born: Ejub Aličić; 2 November 1955 (age 70); Šabac, NR Serbia, FPR Yugoslavia
- Genres: Folk, folk-pop
- Occupation: Singer
- Instrument: Vocals
- Years active: 1971–present
- Labels: PGP-RTB, Diskos, Jugodisk, PGP-RTS, Grand Production

Ejub Aličić (born 2 November 1955), known by his stage name Ljuba Aličić (Serbian Cyrillic: Љуба Аличић), is a Serbian and former FNR-Yugoslavian folk singer. His career has been lasting more than five decades with his biggest hit being the 2003 single-song Ciganin sam, al’ najlepši.
