= Šeki Turković =

- Born: Šućro Turković/Шућро Турковић; 27 November 1953 (age 72); Sjenica, SR Serbia, Yugoslavia
- Genres: Pop-folk; folk
- Occupation: Singer
- Instrument: Vocals
- Years active: 1980–present

Šućro "Šeki" Turković (Serbian Cyrillic: Шућро "Шеки" Турковић; born 27 November 1953) is a Serbian pop-folk singer, popular in the former Yugoslavia. He has been singing since the 1980s.

He was born in Sjenica, in southwestern Serbia.

== Discography ==
- Dok sam te voleo (1982)
- Ostanimo prijatelji (1983)
- Neobična (1985)
- Žao mi je (1986)
- Srećo moja još neprežaljena (1987)
- Ko je krivac (1988)
- Čovek sa srca dva (1989)
- Stani čoveče stani (1990)
- Ljubav je tvoje ime (1991)
- Nisam ti rekao sve (1992)
- U vinu je istina (1993)
- Evo me ljudi (1994)
- Dolaze bolja vremena (1995)
- Ja sam momak za devojke sve (1996)
- Proklela me proklela (1997)
- Taj sam brate (1998)
- Čovek dobre duše (1999)
- Molićeš za oproštaj (2000)
- Ništa nije slučajno (2001)
- Uspori živote (2002)
- Živim (2004)
- Geni (2005)
- Unikat (2006)
- Neka ti nebo sudi (2008)
- Muške suze (2013)
