= Dragan Kojić Keba =

Keba Кеба
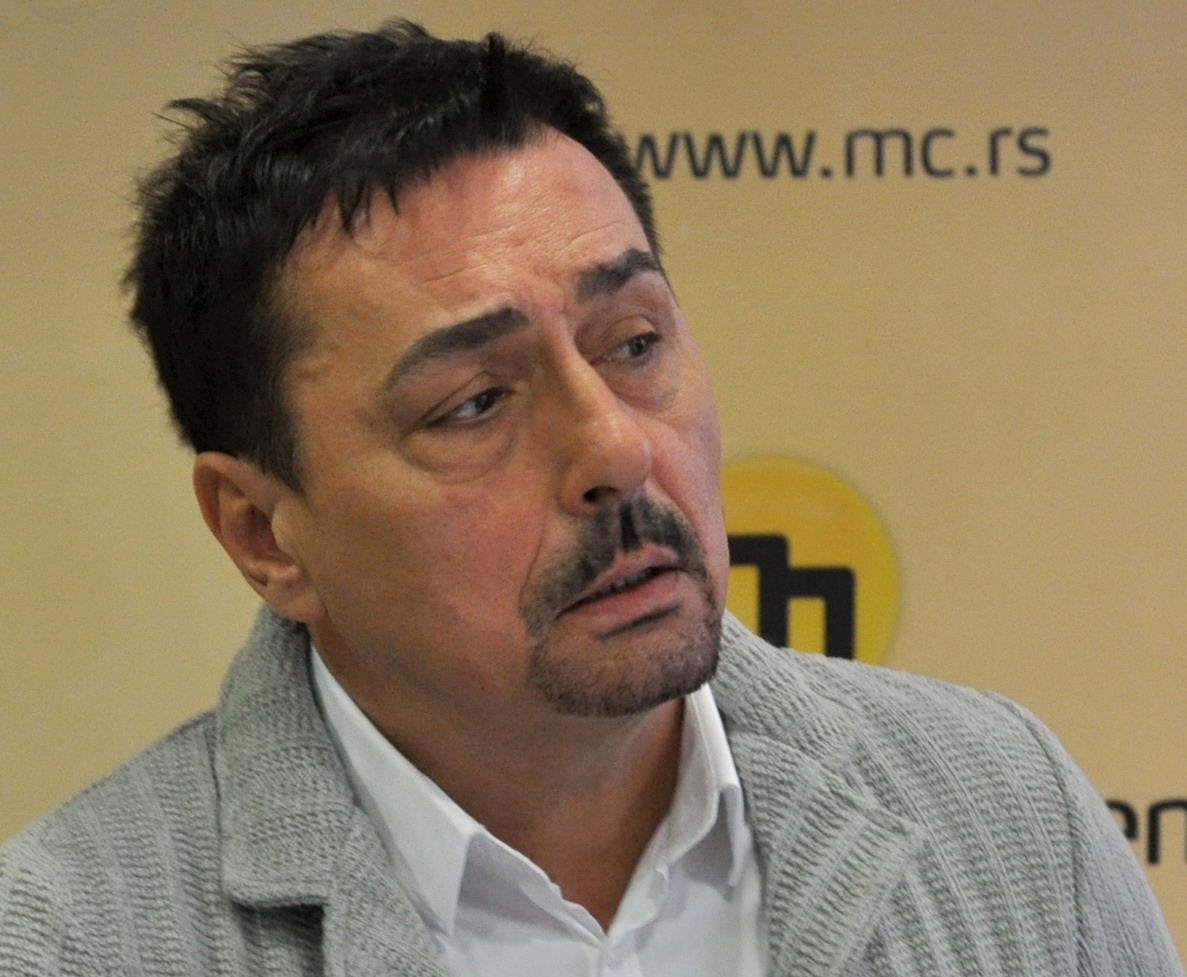
- Keba in 2012

Background information
- Born: Dragan Kojić; 7 October 1960 (age 65); Klupci, PR Serbia, FPR Yugoslavia
- Genres: Folk
- Occupation: Singer
- Instruments: Vocals; acoustic guitar
- Years active: 1976–present
- Labels: PGP-RTS; Grand; BN Music

Dragan Kojić (born 7 October 1960), better known as Keba (Serbian Cyrillic: Кеба), is a Serbian singer.

Debuted in 1976, he has a career spanning more than four decades and remains one of the most acclaimed Serbian folk singers.

Kojić also appeared in the second season of the Serbian version of Your Face Sounds Familiar in 2014.

In 2013, he released the studio album Fer ubica, which included a cover of Azis' song "Sen Trope" titled "Ona to zna".

== Personal life ==
He is married and has two children, singer Nataša Kojić and former footballer Igor Kojić.

== Discography ==
- Ponoćna zvona (1984)
- Ako mi priđeš zaljubiću se (1986)
- Život te otpiše (1987)
- Zar za mene sreće nema (1989)
- Plavo oko plakalo je (1990)
- Srce piše suzama (1991)
- Srce kuca tvoje ime (1992)
- Sve ću tuge poneti sa sobom (1994)
- Siromasi (1996)
- Cveta trešnja (1998)
- Me mangavla daje (2000)
- Tiho noćas (2001)
- Zapaliću pola grada (2002)
- Bensedini (2004)
- Sve na pesmu i veselje (2006)
- Ti pitay za men (2006)
- Fer ubica (2013)

== See also ==
- Music of Serbia
- Serbian folk music
- Turbo-folk
