= Jašar Ahmedovski =

Serbian folk singer

- Born: 22 December 1964 (age 61); Prilep, SR Macedonia, SFR Yugoslavia
- Genres: Folk
- Instrument: Vocals
- Years active: 1981–present
- Labels: BN Music
- Spouse: Snežana Ahmedovska

Jašar Ahmedovski (Macedonian and Serbian Cyrillic: Јашар Ахмедовски; born 22 December 1964) is a Serbian–Macedonian folk singer. His albums were released on numerous labels, including Jugodisk, Diskos and Grand Production. He also released three albums with Južni Vetar.

His younger brother, Ipče, was also a successful singer. He is married to his wife Snežana Ahmedovska.

== Discography ==
- Za srca zaljubljena (1982)
- Jednoj ženi za sećanje (1983)
- Mnogo si me usrećila (1984)
- Dečak zaljubljeni (1985)
- Pomiri me sa najdražom (1986)
- Žena moje mladosti (1987)
- Zabraniću suzama (1989)
- Zarobi me (1990)
- Dobar momak (1993)
- Kad sveća dogori (1995)
- Moj bagreme beli (1996)
- A oko mene ženski svet (1997)
- Venčajte me sa njenom lepotom (1997)
- Ne bilo mi što mi majka misli (2000)
- Koja žena prokle mene (2002)
- Malo ljubav malo greh (2005)
- Idi sve je gotovo (2007)
- Na njenu će dušu sve (2012)
- Pazi sta ces da pozelis (2020)
