= Zvezde Granda =

Serbian reality television music competition

- Genre: Reality competition
- Created by: Saša Popović
- Presented by: Voja Nedeljković; Milan Mitrović; Ana Sević
- Judges: Snežana Đurišić; Dragan Stojković Bosanac; Ana Bekuta; Ceca Raznatovic; Marija Šerifović; Viki Miljković; Đorđe David; Aleksandar Milić; Dara Bubamara; Dragan Kojić Keba
- Country of origin: Serbia
- Original language: Serbian
- No. of series: 19
- No. of episodes: 40 per season

Production
- Running time: 160 minutes
- Production company: Grand Production Emotion Production Special Edition 20 July 2014, (Season 9)

Original release
- Release: 2004 – present

Zvezde Granda (Serbian Cyrillic: Звезде Гранда; lit. 'Grand Stars') is a Serbian singing competition show, created by Saša Popović and produced by Grand Production and Emotion Production for Season 9. It premiered in 2004 on RTV Pink. Zvezde Granda moved to Prva in 2014 before eventually returning to Pink in 2022. The series has also been broadcast on several other networks in the Western Balkans. Zvezde Granda is considered to be one of the longest-running and most-watched reality television shows in Serbia.

Throughout its broadcast, Zvezde Granda has launched the careers of numerous regionally popular singers, which among other include Tanja Savić, Milica Todorović, Rada Manojlović, Milan Stanković, Darko Lazić, Milica Pavlović, Aleksandra Prijović, Tea Tairović, Teodora Džehverović and Džejla Ramović.

== Format ==
Before the show starts recording, potential contestants are scouted by Grand Production through an audition process. Zvezde Granda is consisted of around six rounds where contestants sing one or two songs and are judged by the main judging panel, based on their performance. The first round used to be a blind audition, where the singers are judged exclusively based on their vocal performance. If they receive more than a half of the judges' votes, the contestant may choose their future mentor from the judges who voted for them. However, the judges are allowed to reject the mentorship over a contestant. The judging panel can also use the "panic button" to cut the contestant's performance short. In the following rounds, contestants continue performing, now with the help and training from their mentors, solo or against other contestants, and are judged by the other mentors.

Ultimately, the last remaining contestants enter the grand final, where they face the public vote, which decides the season's winner. In previous seasons, the final was held in large indoor venues in the region, like the Belgrade Arena, Boris Trajkovski Sports Center and Zetra Olympic Hall. The winner of Zvezde Granda receives a recording and management contract with Grand Production, as well as other rewards, such as an apartment or a car.

== Judges ==
Since 2013, the show has included a permanent judging panel, which was initially consisted of songwriter and accordion player Dragan Stojković Bosanac and singers Zorica Brunclik, Aca Lukas, Šaban Šaulić and Snežana Đurišić. Zvezde Granda have also featured a production panel, which was initially composed of Grand Production's key people Saša Popović, Lepa Brena and Saša Jakšić. Since season 13, the judges have also served as mentors to the contestants. Currently, as of season 16, the main judging panel is composed of Dragan Stojković Bosanac, singers Ana Bekuta, Marija Šerifović, Viki Miljković, Đorđe David and Svetlana Ceca Ražnatović, while Popović, Đurišić and Aleksandar Milić Mili pose as the production panel. However, the latter two also act as mentors. In 2024, Sanja Vučić replaced Šerifović as one of the judges. During the period from the depart of Šerifović she was on probation, and only became a permanent judge as of the 2026/27 season.

Zvezde Granda have also seen a number of different presenters throughout the seasons. Initially, the show was hosted by Saša Popović. The longest-serving presenters are Voja Nedeljković and Sanja Kužet.

Presenters	Saša Popović: 2004–2024; Tamara Raonić Popović: 2004-2005; Dragana Katić: 2004-2005, 2014; Ines Gavrilović: 2004-2005; Suzana Mančić: 2004-2005; Ena Popov: 2007; Marko Miljković: 2007; Silvija Nedeljković: 2008-2009; Nemanja Stevanović: 2008-2009; Vladimir Stanojević: 2010-2011; Ljubinka Buba Dobrosavljev: 2010-2011; Milan Mitrović: 2011-2013, 2024–present; Ana Sević: 2011-2013, 2024–present; Voja Nedeljković: 2013–present; Sanja Kužet: 2013-2016, 2017–2024; Sanja Ćulibrk: 2016-2017; Main Judges: Saša Popović: 2004-2024; Snežana Đurišić: 2007-2012, 2013–present; Saša "Žika" Jakšić: 2007-2012, 2013-2015; Lepa Brena: 2007-2011, 2013-2015; Dragan Kojić Keba: 2015; 2025–present; Dara Bubamara: 2025–present; Ana Bekuta: 2007, 2014–present; Aca Lukas: 2007-2011, 2013-2018; Željko Joksimović: 2014; Šaban Šaulić: 2008-2011, 2013-2016; Marija Šerifović: 2015–2025; Dragan Stojković Bosanac: 2012–2025; Svetlana Ceca Ražnatović: 2021–present; Zorica Brunclik: 2013-2015; Jelena Karleuša: 2015-2021; Viki Miljković: 2015–2025; Đorđe David: 2018–present; Aleksandar Milić Mili: 2020–present; Sanja Vučić: 2024–present

== Series overview ==
To date, 19 series have been broadcast, as summarised below.
Winning contestant

Series	Year	Winner(s)	Country	Winner's mentor	Ref
1	2004	Branislav Mojićević	Serbia and Montenegro	None	
2	2005	Milica Todorović	Serbia and Montenegro	None	
3	2007	Dušan Svilar	Serbia	None	
4	2008/09	Darko Lazić	Serbia	None	
5	2010/11	Stefan Petrušić	Serbia	None	
6	2011/12	Darko Martinović	Montenegro	None	
7	2012/13	Amar Gile	Bosnia and Herzegovina	None	
8	2013/14	Milan Milovanović	Serbia	None	
9	2014/15	Haris Berković	Bosnia and Herzegovina	None	
10	2015/16	Ibro Bublin	Bosnia and Herzegovina	None	
11	2016/17	Aleksa Perović (by judges' vote)	Serbia	None	
11	2016/17	Riste Risteski (by public vote)	Macedonia	None	
12	2017/18	Anid Ćušić	Bosnia and Herzegovina		
13	2018/19	Džejla Ramović	Bosnia and Herzegovina	Marija Šerifović	
14	2019/21	Mahir Mulalić	Bosnia and Herzegovina	Marija Šerifović	
15	2021/22	Nermin Handžić	Bosnia and Herzegovina	Viki Miljković	
16	2022/23	Slavica Angelova	North Macedonia	Đorđe David	
17	2023/24	Šejla Zonić	Bosnia and Herzegovina	Svetlana Ceca Ražnatović	
18	2024/25	Nikola Stanišić	North Macedonia	Svetlana Ceca Ražnatović	
19	2025/26	Tamara Danilović (by judges' vote)	Serbia	Svetlana Ceca Ražnatović	
19	2025/26	Bojan Ilievski (by public vote)	North Macedonia	Đorđe David	

== Regional broadcasts ==
Current broadcasts
Country	Channel	Date
(Serbia)	Pink TV	2004-2014, 2022–2025
(Bosnia and Herzegovina)	Nova	2018–present
(Montenegro)	Nova	2022–present
(North Macedonia)	Sitel	2023–present

Broadcasting history
Country	Channel	Premiere date
(Serbia)	Pink TV	2004.
(Serbia)	Prva TV	2014
(Serbia)	Grand TV	2014
(Bosnia and Herzegovina)	Pink BH	2004
(Bosnia and Herzegovina)	OBN, RTRS	2014
(Bosnia and Herzegovina)	Nova	2018
(Montenegro)	Pink M	2004
(Montenegro)	Prva CG	2014
(Montenegro)	Nova	2022
(North Macedonia)	Kanal 5	2014
(North Macedonia)	Sitel	2023
