= Zlata Petrović =

Serbian pop-folk singer (born 1962)

Zlata Petrović (Злата Петровић; born 13 July 1962) is a Serbian pop-folk singer.

== Biography ==
Zlata Petrović was born 13 July 1962 in Obrenavac, Belgrade, SR Serbia, SFR Yugoslavia to a Montenegrin father and a Romani mother.

== Discography ==
- Dođi da mi ruke greješ (1983)
- Ljubi me još malo (1984)
- Srce će ga prepoznati (1986)
- Koga sam ja to volela (1987)
- Daj mi Bože malo sreće (1989)
- Dušmani (1991)
- Učinilo vreme svoje (1993)
- Proklet da je ovaj život (1994)
- Ljubi me još malo - the best of (1995)
- Ne daš mi da dišem (1995)
- Bravo, ti si pobedio (1996)
- Ljubav nema pamet (1997)
- Infektivno ludilo Zlate Petrović - the best of (1998)
- Mirišeš na nju (2001)
- Zagušljivo (2004)
- Pola tri (2008)
