= Big Brother VIP (Serbian TV series) season 5 =

Big Brother VIP
- Season 5
- Presented by: Marijana Mićić; Ana Mihajlovski
- No. of days: 43
- No. of housemates: 17
- Winner: Žarko Stojanović
- Runner-up: Dragutin Topić
- Participating countries: Serbia; Bosnia and Herzegovina; Montenegro; Macedonia

Release
- Original network: B92; Televizija OBN, BN; Prva TV; Sitel
- Original release: 25 March – 6 May 2013

Season chronology
- ← Previous; Season 4

Veliki Brat VIP 2013 also known as Veliki Brat VIP 5 (short VBVIP5) was the fifth celebrity season of the Serbian production of Veliki Brat. It premiered on 25 March 2013 on B92 as the first season to be broadcast on this channel since Veliki Brat 2009 and the first celebrity season since Veliki Brat VIP 2008. The season lasted 43 days until the live finale on 6 May 2013. The winner is Žarko Stojanović.

Many celebrities were rumored to be the housemates, some of the including Boris Novković, Samantha Fox, Milić Vukašinović, Lepa Lukić, Saška Janković and some former housemates from the regular season. Producers did not want to comment on the speculations, and did not confirm nor dismiss the rumors. On the day before the launch of the season paparazzi managed to capture some of the celebrities while entering the quarantine, but all of them were masked.

The design of the house was revealed on 21 March 2013 and the pictures showed that the house design is quite similar to the one used for the previous regular season. Marijana Mićić hosted the show once again, but Ana Mihajlovski was her co-host for the live launch. This was the first season that Ana hosted since Veliki Brat VIP 2008.

This season saw the return of the nominations by the housemates, but for the first time the public voted to save their favourite housemates out of the three or more nominated. The season uses the same eye logo as the previous regular season and the eleventh British series.

== Housemates ==
Sixteen housemates entered show on Day 1. On Day 8, Vendi Entered The House.

Name	Notability	Day entered	Day exited	Status
Žarko Stojanović	Reality TV star - participated in the fifth season of French Secret Story	1	43	Winner
Dragutin Topić	Athlete	1	43	Runner-up
Ava Karabatić	Glamour model and reality TV personality	1	43	3rd Place
Željko Stojanović	Reality TV star - participated in the fifth season of French Secret Story	1	43	4th Place
Aneta Nakovska	Singer	1	43	5th Place
Soraja Vučelić	TV and media personality	1	43	6th Place
Vesna Vukelić Vendi	Singer, glamour model and reality TV star	8	41	Evicted
Maja Volk	Writer, TV presenter and musician	1	41	Evicted
Milić Vukašinović	Musician and reality TV star	1	40	Evicted
Maja Nikolić	Singer and reality TV star	1	39	Evicted
Slavko Labović	Actor	1	36	Evicted
Ivana Stamenković "Sindi"	Singer and fashion designer	1	29	Evicted
Boban Stojanović	LGBT Activist	1	22	Evicted
Nevena Milićević	Model	1	17	Ejected
Uroš Ćertić	Stuntman	1	15	Evicted
Vesna de Vinča	Journalist and President of Miss Serbia and Miss Montenegro	1	9	Evicted
Branislav Petrušević "Petrući"	Actor	1	8	Evicted

== Weekly summary ==
Week 1	Entrances	Aneta, Ava, Boban, Dragutin, Maja Volk, Nevena, Petrući, Sindi, Slavko, Uroš, Vesna and Žarko & Željko all moved in the house of Veliki Brat on live launch night. Maja Nikolić, Milić and Soraja also entered the house, but in a secret headquarters room.
Week 1	Tasks	VB Government - Housemates were assigned roles in the government and tasks according to each role. Two housemates were voted out of the VB Government (Ava and Uroš) and had to live in the opposition van in the garden. The Dutch Approval - In order for the VB country to enter the EU, housemates in the government had to take turns and make sure that a model windmill in the garden did not stop rotating for more than 30 seconds. To win immunity from that week's eviction, the housemates that belong to the opposition needed to sabotage the task, otherwise they would be up for eviction themselves.
Week 1	Twist	Maja Nikolić, Milić and Soraja were placed in a secret room. They took the role of VBIA and had the power to overrule all the decisions that housemates made and fix the votes for the prime minister and the opposition that the housemates had cast.
Week 1	Exits	Vesna exited the house after a few days because she had arrangements before entering the house, and had reached an agreement with the producers. She entered back in the house the following week. Governing housemates (Aneta, Boban, Vesna, Žarko & Željko, Maja V, Nevena, Petrući, Sindi, Slavko and Dragutin) failed in the Dutch part of the task and were therefore up for eviction. The public voted for the housemate that they wanted to save; Petrući had the fewest votes and was the first housemate to be evicted.
Week 2	Entrances	On Day 8, during the surprise eviction, Vesna Vukelić Vendi entered the house.
Week 2	Tasks	Big Brother's Horror Show - Housemates participated in a number of tasks. Some of the tasks happened in a dark room with rodents, where housemates needed to feel around for various objects in complete darkness, while other tasks included eating raw meat or animal intestines or body parts.
Week 2	Exits	On the night of the first live eviction, Marijana announced that a second live surprise eviction will happen within the 24 hours after the first housemate is evicted. All the housemates were up for eviction and the public voted to save their favourite contestant. Vesna da Vinča got the fewest votes and was the second housemate to be evicted. The votes from this particular eviction went to charity. In the same week, Housemates nominated for the first time in the season. Housemates with the most nominations were Maja Nikolić, Slavko and Žarko and Željko. They were up for eviction alongside Uroš, who was eligible for eviction because he broke the rule regarding discussing nominations. Uroš became the third housemate to be evicted from the Veliki Brat house.
Week 3	Tasks	Balkan song contest 4 - Housemates were split into five different groups and had to learn songs that Veliki Brat gave them. Each of the songs is accompanied by a dance routine that housemates need to learn as well and perform in front of the live audience.: Group one: Ava, Soraja, Željko and Slavko; Song: "Italiana" by Severina; Group two: Boban and Aneta; Song: "Miljacka/Ludak kao ja" by Halid Bešlić and Željko Joksimović; Group three: Vendi, Sindi, Nevena and Žarko; Song: "Gangnam Style" by Psy; Group four: Maja N and Milić; Song: "Zajdi, zajdi/Zbunjena" by Toše Proeski and Negative; Group five: Maja V and Dragutin; Song: "Daleko si" by Aca Lukas and Ivana Selakov; This is the fourth time a season of Veliki Brat incorporated this task: first was in Veliki Brat VIP 1, second in Veliki Brat VIP 4 and third in Veliki Brat 2011.
Week 3	Exits	On Day 16, after a number of insults and provocations from Sindi, Nevena physically assaulted her, therefore breaking one of the fundamental rules of Veliki Brat. Sindi was making fun of Nevena's cellulite, and pinched her, after which Nevena hit her in the head. Nevena was ejected later that day. All of the housemates were up for eviction as a punishment for constant rule-breaking. By winning the BSC, Ava, Soraja, Željko and Slavko were exempt from the public vote. Boban had the fewest votes and was the housemate to be evicted.
Week 4	Tasks	Suleiman the Magnificent - Housemates were assigned roles from a popular TV soap Muhteşem Yüzyıl. In order to pass the task, they needed to stay in character throughout the duration of the task.
Week 4	Exits	Maja Nikolić was punished for rule-breaking, and as a result, she was up for eviction. Ava, Sindi and Aneta were nominated by the housemates. Sindi had the fewest votes and was the fifth housemate to be evicted.
Week 5	Tasks	Grease - housemates had to act out some of the scenes from the movie Grease, and perform a selection of songs chosen by Veliki Brat.
Week 5	Exits	Slavko, Aneta and Vendi were nominated as a punishment for discussing nominations, while Maja Nikolić and Top had most nominations by the housemates. All five of them faced the public vote. Slavko had the fewest votes and was the sixth housemate to be evicted.
Week 6	Tasks	Since it was the final week and there was no budget to be won, housemates participated in a number of mini tasks for treats and just for fun.
Week 6	Exits	Maja N, Ava and Soraja were the housemates got the most nominations from their fellow housemates and faced the public vote. Maja N was evicted on Day 39, and became the seventh housemate to be evicted. After Maja's eviction, the phone lines were re-opened but this time the public was voting for the winner. The following day Milic was evicted, as he was the housemate with the fewest votes. Maja V and Vendi were both evicted on Day 41. On the final night, Soraja was the first housemate to be evicted, placing sixth. Aneta finished fifth and Željko was fourth. Ava was evicted next, finishing third and Žarko was then announced as the winner, making Dragutin the runner up.

== Nominations table ==
	Week 1		Week 2	Week 3	Week 4	Week 5	Week 6	Final	
Žarko	Nominated	No nominations	Maja N Dragutin	Nominated	Ava; Soraja	Dragutin; Maja N	Dragutin; Maja N	Winner (Day 43)	
Dragutin	Nominated	No nominations	Žarko & Željko; Sindi	Nominated	Ava; Žarko	Žarko; Željko	Soraja; Milić	Runner-Up (Day 43)	
Ava	In the Van	No nominations	Maja N Slavko	Exempt	Aneta; Soraja	Maja N Soraja	Aneta; Maja N	Third Place (Day 43)	
Željko	Nominated	No nominations	Maja N Dragutin	Exempt	Sindi; Soraja	Dragutin; Maja N	Soraja; Žarko	Fourth Place (Day 43)	
Aneta	Nominated	No nominations	Uroš; Maja N	Nominated	Sindi; Ava	Nominated	Ava; Soraja	Fifth Place (Day 43)	
Soraja	Secret; Room	No nominations	Aneta; Nevena	Exempt	Aneta; Željko	Ava; Milić	Maja N Aneta	Sixth Place (Day 43)	
Vendi	Not in House		Maja N Slavko	Nominated	Ava; Milić	Nominated	Soraja; Milić	Evicted (Day 41)	
Maja V	Nominated	No nominations	Uroš; Soraja	Nominated	Ava; Sindi	Maja N Ava	Željko; Žarko	Evicted (Day 41)	
Milić	Secret; Room	No nominations	Slavko; Dragutin	Nominated	Slavko; Maja V	Dragutin; Maja V	Maja V Dragutin	Evicted (Day 40)	
Maja N	Secret; Room	No nominations	Žarko & Željko; Maja V	Nominated	Nominated	Banned	Ava; Soraja	Evicted (Day 39)	
Slavko	Nominated	No nominations	Žarko & Željko; Boban	Exempt	Banned	Nominated	Evicted (Day 36)		
Sindi	Nominated	No nominations	Maja N Aneta	Nominated	Aneta; Vendi	Evicted (Day 29)			
Boban	Nominated	No nominations	Slavko; Uroš	Nominated	Evicted (Day 22)				
Nevena	Nominated	No nominations	Soraja; Ava	Ejected (Day 17)					
Uroš	In the Van	No nominations	Nominated	Evicted (Day 15)					
Vesna	Nominated	No nominations	Evicted (Day 9)						
Petrući	Nominated	Evicted (Day 8)							
Notes	1	none	2	3	4	5	6	none	
Up for eviction	Aneta; Boban; Dragutin; Maja V Nevena; Petrući; Sindi; Slavko; Vesna; Žarko & Željko	All; Housemates	Maja N Slavko; Uroš; Žarko & Željko	Aneta; Boban; Dragutin; Maja N Maja V Milić; Sindi; Vendi; Žarko	Aneta; Ava; Maja N Sindi	Aneta; Dragutin; Maja N Slavko; Vendi	Ava; Maja N Soraja	All; Housemates	
Ejected	none			Nevena	none				
Evicted	Petrući; Fewest votes to save	Vesna; Fewest votes to save	Uroš; Fewest votes to save	Boban; Fewest votes to save	Sindi; Fewest votes to save	Slavko; Fewest votes to save	Maja N Fewest votes to save	Milić; Fewest votes (Out of 9)	Maja V Fewest votes (Out of 8)
Evicted	Petrući; Fewest votes to save	Vesna; Fewest votes to save	Uroš; Fewest votes to save	Boban; Fewest votes to save	Sindi; Fewest votes to save	Slavko; Fewest votes to save	Maja N Fewest votes to save	Vendi; Fewest votes (Out of 7)	Soraja; Fewest votes (Out of 6)
Evicted	Petrući; Fewest votes to save	Vesna; Fewest votes to save	Uroš; Fewest votes to save	Boban; Fewest votes to save	Sindi; Fewest votes to save	Slavko; Fewest votes to save	Maja N Fewest votes to save	Aneta; Fewest votes (Out of 5)	Željko; Fewest votes (Out of 4)
Evicted	Petrući; Fewest votes to save	Vesna; Fewest votes to save	Uroš; Fewest votes to save	Boban; Fewest votes to save	Sindi; Fewest votes to save	Slavko; Fewest votes to save	Maja N Fewest votes to save	Ava; Fewest votes (Out of 3)	Dragutin; Fewest votes (Out of 2)
Evicted	Petrući; Fewest votes to save	Vesna; Fewest votes to save	Uroš; Fewest votes to save	Boban; Fewest votes to save	Sindi; Fewest votes to save	Slavko; Fewest votes to save	Maja N Fewest votes to save	Žarko; Most votes to win	

=== Notes ===
- ^Note 1: Maja N, Milić and Soraja entered to a Secret Room on Day 1. On Day 2, they had to "evict" two housemates from the main house to a van. They chose Ava and Uroš.
- ^Note 2: Maja, Slavko, Željko and Žarko were nominated by the housemates, while Uroš was up for eviction because he broke the rule regarding talking about nominations.
- ^Note 3: Ava, Soraja, Slavko and Željko won the Balkan Song Contest and are immune.
- ^Note 4: Maja N was supposed to be ejected, but Veliki Brat decided to turn it into a task and have the housemates be prosecution/defendants in a court case and then decided she could stay. She was however automatically nominated for eviction, and banned from the nominating. Slavko was also banned from nominating.
- ^Note 5: Aneta, Slavko and Vendi were nominated by Veliki Brat for discussing nominations.
- ^Note 6: Nominations were done face to face.

== Controversy and criticism ==
=== Animal harm and exploitation ===
During week 2, while doing the shopping task Ava, Maja Nikolić and Vendi had to go in a dark room which had over 300 mice in it; they had to feel and walk around the room which had no light in it and stepped on some of the animals that were in there. After several viewers complained the producers said that no animals were severely harmed during the task and apologized for upsetting the viewers. Several animal rights organizations said that they will press charges against Emotion.
Later, in week 4 of the season, in a live stream of the show, Vendi was heard talking about a problem with stray dogs in her neighborhood. She said that the dogs were getting aggressive, and that because the local government did not do anything about it she tried poisoning the stray dogs herself. She also added that the poison did not work and that her neighbour wanted to shoot the dogs with a gun, but he was stopped by a policeman. This caused an outrage with the viewers who launched a petition against Vendi. The petition stated that Vendi should get ejected from the house and that she should face charges for violence against animals. Several animal rights organisations stated that they will prosecute Vendi once she leaves the house.

=== Contact with the outside world ===
According to Kurir, during a live stream broadcast, Nevena was interviewed in the Diary room. In the interview, Nevena said, "It's not fair that some of the housemates are allowed to call and talk with their family!". Seconds after she said this, the audio was censored with the sound that the producers use to cover up the swearing. It is assumed that the housemate with the phone privilege is Sindi, since she was talking about their conflicts shortly before that. Producers refused to comment on this event.
