= Big Brother (Serbian TV series) season 4 =

Fourth season of Veliki Brat

Big Brother
- Season 4
- Logo for the fourth season that was used in Serbia, Bosnia and Herzegovina, Montenegro and Macedonia.
- Presented by: Marijana Mićić; Antonija Blaće
- No. of days: 106
- No. of housemates: 21
- Winner: Marijana Čvrljak
- Runner-up: Duško Bogdanović
- Participating countries: Serbia; Bosnia and Herzegovina; Montenegro; Macedonia; Croatia

Release
- Original network: RTV Pink; Pink BH; Pink M; Sitel; RTL Televizija
- Original release: 13 March – 26 June 2011

Season chronology
- ← Previous: Serbian season 3; Croatian season 5; Next → Serbian season 5

The Big Brother logo used in Croatia for this season.

Veliki Brat 2011 (commonly known as Veliki Brat 4 or VB4 for short) was the fourth season of the Serbian production of the Big Brother reality television series Veliki Brat. This season was notable for being the first to feature houseguests from Croatia, and in doing so it holds the record for largest number of unique nations represented with five. Along with Serbia and Croatia, the other three nations represented were Montenegro, Bosnia and Herzegovina, and North Macedonia. The program is known as Big Brother in Croatia due to a former Croatian Big Brother series that aired for five seasons which was not affiliated with Veliki Brat.

The season began airing on 13 March 2011, marking the first time that the regular season was broadcast on Pink TV.

== Production ==
=== Trailer and subtitles ===
For the first time, a trailer was produced for the show. It features housemates from previous seasons, dressed in uniforms, attending VB - Škola za poznate (Big Brother's school of fame). Hosts of the show are also featured as teachers, and Boki 13, from season 4 of the celebrity version, appears at the end of the video. The trailer premiered on YouTube.

Despite most of the press dubbing the season "School of fame", the official slogan was "Ljubi bližnjeg svog" (Love thy neighbor). A second teaser trailer was released a few weeks before the show; this one featuring falling flowers, spelling out "Ljubi bližnjeg svog" (similar to the one used in British Big Brother 11).

=== Auditions ===
Auditions took place from December 2010 to January 2011. Applications were submitted via SMS, telephone or online form – hosted by Emotion. In Croatia, auditions were open for everyone, with no previous application needed.

The first casting was held in Podgorica on 24 December 2010. The day after, auditions were held simultaneously in Sarajevo and Skopje. The first round of auditions concluded in Banja Luka.

The second round of auditions were held in Croatia, with over 5,500 people applying. They lasted six days in three cities: Zagreb, Rijeka and Split. The final round of casting was held in Serbia, with auditions in Čačak, Užice, Niš, Novi Sad, Kragujevac and Belgrade, between 14 January 2011 and 23 January 2011.

=== Censorship ===
Previously, each of the regular seasons were broadcast on B92 (a Serbian television broadcaster), while some of the celebrity editions were shown on Pink TV. This was the first time that Pink aired a regular season.

There was much speculation about who would host the show; many celebrities were tipped, including Nataša Bekvalac and Severina Vučković. Eventually, the producers announced Antonija Blaće as the host of the show, as well as Marijana Mićić who was confirmed only a few days before the launch.

At the end of February 2011, Pink was criticized for having too many reality programs, with participants becoming more inappropriate than the previous ones. The Serbian Broadcasting Agency warned both the broadcasters and the producers that there would be zero tolerance on violence, racism and hate speech, stating that they would be kept under supervision.

The production company Emotion said that they would minimize content that could be considered harmful and that live streaming would be delayed by a few minutes. For the first time, the show was marked as unsuitable for viewers under 18, but the age limit was later lowered to 15.

=== Big Brother's relationship with the housemates ===
Big Brother could talk to the housemates in two ways:

==== Through the speakers ====
Big Brother could talk to the housemates through the speakers to: announce the start or end of tasks, inform about punishments, or call a housemate to the diary room.

==== In the Diary room ====
Big Brother's relationship with the housemates while in the Diary room was more intimate. He would ask different questions and be more emotive.

=== Big Brother's voice ===
Although more than one voice actor played Big Brother, their voices were filtered to sound robotic and inhuman. Due to the robotic voice, housemates had the impression that Big Brother was one person watching them constantly.

=== Broadcasting ===
==== Companion shows ====
===== Big Brother's Colosseum =====
For the first time, Big Brother's Big Brain was not broadcast. In previous years, various companion shows were broadcast with Big Brain remaining a constant fixture.

That year a new show was produced: Big Brother's Colosseum, a game show in which the winning housemate got to be the House Captain. The House Captain was immune to nominations, and the nominations that housemates place were worth double. The show was hosted by Marijana Mićić and Maca.

The show was canceled halfway through the season, as two housemates (Dražen and Soraja) were injured during one of the games. Dražen was hospitalized and had to leave the show.

===== Call on Big Brother =====
Pozovite Velikog brata (English: Call on Big Brother) was a new show, hosted by Irina Radović (a former host of Big Brother's Big Brain). It was a phone-in morning show, wherein Irina and a guest would receive calls from viewers who commented on what happened in the house recently. Some guests were family members of the housemates, while others included psychologists, an astrologist, and some of the evicted housemates.

Halfway through the season, Irina signed a contract with Prva Srpska Televizija and had to leave Pink TV, so Marijana took her place.

=== Eye and the house ===
Producers changed the design of the eye logo. This season used the British Big Brother 2010 logo – an eye composed of flowers and petals, with a slight color difference. The opening credits were changed as well; the music stayed the same, but the intro was also taken from the 2010 British seriew, although slightly altered.

The house itself remained the same, consisting of the kitchen and dining room, living room, bedroom, toilet, and garden. There were a few changes though: the walls of the showers were transparent, the swimming pool was now placed inside the house. Notably, all 16 beds were merged, with the mattresses and pillows sewn together. Also, there was just one large bed cover. For the first time, there was a smoking booth which housemates could enter one at a time.

Next to the house, the Dumps, a secret area, was built.

The following celebrity season Veliki Brat VIP 5 used the same logo and titles.

== The twists ==
=== Prize Fund ===
The prize fund for this season increased from €100,000 to €150,000. However, a penalty system was introduced, wherein any infraction of the Big Brother rules resulted in money from the prize fund being taken away. Moreover, the weekly shopping budget would also be decreased. Ultimately, the winner was rewarded €104,000.

=== The Dumps ===
The Dumps, a yard full of garbage, was a secret place in which some housemates lived. Housemates lived in an old bus and had an old car acting as a Diary Room. In the second week, a so-called "ninja" (Radašin) entered the Dumps. His task was to obey housemates and to bring them things they wanted from the main house, being careful not to reveal the secret place.

=== Poisonous arrow ===
Housemates could be hit with a "poisonous arrow". Big Brother would decide to do something to the housemate who was hit. For instance, in week 1, Ema was hit with a poisonous arrow by Duško (who was evicted from the main house to the Dumps). Big Brother then decided to take all of Ema's personal belongings. In the second week, Bojana was hit by an arrow from Soraja and had to do all of the house chores by herself.

=== The Lioness ===
On day 49, the Lioness conquered Big Brother, who became her servant and kidnapped the male housemates (Duško, Horvat, Lester, Nemeš, Nikola, Nirmal and Radiša) and placed them in her cave, known as the Lioness' Cave. She would train the boys with the aim to increase their attractiveness. The Lioness told the female housemates (Bojana, Ema, Marijana and Soraja) that they would have the chance to save some of the men. For every one saved, they would receive €81 for their weekly budget.

=== Indecent proposal ===
During week 9's eviction, Big Brother offered housemates the chance for one evicted housemate to return in exchange for €35,000 from the prize fund. They had to unanimously decide whether to accept or reject the proposal. Though Duško, Brandon, and Antonia initially rejected the indecent proposal, they eventually agreed to the offer. Upon accepting the deal, housemates then entered the Diary Room, one by one, to vote for the housemate they wanted back in the house. Having received the most votes to re-enter, Ema was returned to the Big Brother House.

== Housemates ==
Housemate	Age on entry	Occupation	Residence	Day entered	Day exited	Reason
Marijana Čvrljak	27	Housewife	Šibenik, Croatia	1	106	Winner
Duško Bogdanović	55	Farmer	Galibabinac	1	106	Runner-up
Horvat Čagalj	33	Babysitter	Dugi Rat, Croatia	1	106	3rd Place
Branislav "Brandon" Radonić	24	Performer	Čenta	85 (Note: Brandon was evicted on day 85 by his fellow housemates. The public then voted for an evicted Housemate to return and Brandon won the most votes to return to the House on the same day. He eventually was voted in 4th place during the finale.)	106	4th Place
Branislav "Brandon" Radonić	24	Performer	Čenta	50	85	Evicted
Soraja - Sara Vučelić	24	Model	Bar, Montenegro	1	106	5th Place
Nikola "Nemeš" Nemešević	22	Opera singer	Belgrade	1	104	Evicted
Nirmal Kukić	25	Student	Živinice, Bosnia and Herzegovina	1	104	Evicted
Nikola "Lester" Nasteski	20	Model/Stripper	Skopje, North Macedonia	1	104	Evicted
Nikola Maurović	21	Student	Zaprešić, Croatia	1	104	Evicted
Bojana Stojković	25	Volleyball player	Užice	1	99	Evicted
Antonia Jovanović	25	Party girl	Opatija, Croatia	50	92	Evicted
Ema Šuker	20	Professional athlete	Zagreb, Croatia	64 (Note: Ema was evicted on day 57. She returned to the House on day 64 after the Housemates after the Housemates decided to trade €35,000 in return for an evicted Housemate to return and voted for Ema to return.)	71	Evicted
Ema Šuker	20	Professional athlete	Zagreb, Croatia	1	57	Evicted
Vladimir Tomović	28	Student	Bar, Montenegro	50	66	Ejected
Dražen Bogdan	46	Firefighter	Sveti Ivan Zelina, Croatia	1	66 (Note: Dražen initially left the House and went to the hospital due to an injury on day 33 however due to his health condition he returned home on day 66.)	Walked
Radiša Miljković (Note: Radiša Miljković previously participated on the third season of Veliki Brat, where he finished in 7th place.)	50	Farmer	Aleksinac	8	64	Evicted
Tamara Đorđević	23	Promoter	Belgrade	8	50	Evicted
Slavica Đulejić	42	Taxi driver	Smederevo	1	43	Evicted
Dragana Strahinjić	27	Beautician	Požarevac	1	36	Evicted
George Rkman	39	Taxi driver	Newcastle upon Tyne, United Kingdom	1	29	Evicted
Mila Tokić	21	Promoter	Zagreb, Croatia	1	22	Evicted
Milan Grahovac	31	Propagandist	Sombor	1	15	Evicted

== Weekly summary ==
Week 1	Entrances	George, Bojana, Horvat, Marijana, Nemeš, Duško, Soraja, Mila, Dragana, Nikola, Slavica, Nirmal, Milan, Ema, Dražen and Lester entered the house during the launch night.
Week 1	Tasks	The Big Cleaning – On the second day, housemates found a sticky note on the fridge saying "Sorry for the mess! Love, Big Brother.", and found that the garden was full of trash from the party Big Brother organized for himself but had not invited the housemates, who had to clean up the mess within an hour and a half. The same situation repeated the following days, with more stuff to be cleaned, and more and more confetti scattered across the garden. Housemates in the Dumps had a task as well; they had to sort out the garbage that came down the shoot from the house. There were two daily tasks: Taxi Duel (the prize was a party) and synchronized swimming (in order to win treats – tiramisu).
Week 1	Poisonous arrow	During the second day housemates were informed that one of them would be struck with a "poisonous arrow". Housemates were confused at first, but later found out that Duško, after he was evicted, had to choose who would lose their clothes - he chose Ema. At the end of the week, Ema played a game similar to Wheel of Fortune and won back some of her clothes.
Week 1	Exits	On the launch night Big Brother told the housemates that he did not like the number 13, and he that one of the housemates would be evicted the next day (13 housemates were inside the house, and 3 more in the Dumps). Housemates voted out Duško, but Big Brother chose to move him into the Dumps instead of evicting him. At the end of the week, after the nominations, housemates in the dumps chose who would join them, and chose Soraja.
Week 2	Entrances	Tamara and Radašin – Tamara entered the house regularly, but Radašin came in as a ninja. They had a secret task, to provide housemates in the dumps with anything they might need, and not get caught by other housemates.
Week 2	Tasks	Cirque du burlesque – Some housemates had to learn circus acts, and some of them had to learn how to perform a burlesque show. 25 again – housemates in the dumps had to help Duško feel age 25 again. This included dying his hair and dressing him up as a teen. Their other task was to make a campaign for recycling.
Week 2	Poisonous arrow	After Soraja was evicted and moved to the Dumps, she chose to hit Bojana with a poison arrow - making her the housemaid. No other housemates were allowed to clean the house or the dishes - Bojana had to do all this on her own.
Week 2	Social interactions	It was speculated that Nemeš and Bojana would get together, but after one party, Nemeš got close with Marijana. They kissed, even though Nemeš told Marijana that she would get in trouble for it, and later got close under the sheets. Some even suggested that they had sex - though the details are blurry.
Week 2	Exits	Mila, Milan and Lester were nominated by the audience. Housemates later voted who would leave the House. Housemates from the Dumps and the Nominated Ones also participated in the voting. Milan was evicted with 23 votes from his Housemates; Mila (18 points) and Lester (16 points) were saved from eviction.
Week 3	Tasks	Third Age House - For this week's task, the house was turned into a retirement home. Some housemates took on roles of staff, while others acted like clients - elders.
Week 3	Poisonous arrow	After Milan was evicted, he chose to shoot Dražen with a poisonous arrow. Dražen's punishment was to hand wash all of the underwear throughout the week.
Week 3	Twists	For the first time, housemates from the regular house found out about the Dumps. During Big Brother's Colosseum, they were divided into two teams, competing for a week in the regular house. George, Ema and Nemeš joined the team from the Dumps - to make the teams equal. The team from the Dumps won and got to move in the house, while the other housemates were moved tho the Dumps.
Week 3	Exits	Housemates that lost in the Colosseum were nominated, and the region voted to save their favourite. Mila, Slavica and Tamara had the fewest votes. Housemates voted by giving 2 and 1 points to the nominees, and Mila left the House.
Week 4	Tasks	Scout's honour - Housemates would become Big Brother's scouts for this week's task. They would learn basic skills for living outdoors, cooking on the fire and sleeping in tents.
Week 4	Poisonous arrow	After she was evicted, Mila decided to shoot Bojana with an arrow. Mila said she wanted to see Bojana all dressed up, so Bojana's punishment was to "be a lady for a week". Bojana accepted the challenge with no hard feelings, but wondered what she had done to make the evicted housemates not like her.
Week 4	Exits	George, Nirmal and Soraja were nominated by public televoting. George received the most votes from his Housemates and left the House
Week 5	Tasks	The Big Brother Tour - housemates had to ride 2,336 kilometers on exercise bikes to visit various places in the five countries participating in this year's Big Brother. Košutnjak in Belgrade, where the Big Brother House is situated, was the starting point and finish line. Stops were Turija, Plitvice Lakes, Omiš, Banja Luka, Sarajevo, Podgorica, Ohrid and Đavolja Varoš. When arriving in every place there would be another task for the Housemates.
Week 5	Poisonous arrow	George aimed his Poisonous arrow towards Slavica who had to prepare a meal for all the Housemates, including the ones from the Dumps, and later do the dishes. She also had to kiss Radašin on the cheek once or even twice a day if Radašin wanted that.
Week 5	Exits	Dragana, Nemeš and Ema were nominated by the public. Dragana was evicted by most of the votes of her Housemates.
Week 6	Tasks	Bonding - Housemates were put into pairs and had to live four days tied up with their partner. Boys had to do their female partner's make-up, and girls had to brush their male partner's teeth. Pairs were: Radiša - Slavica, Duško - Horvat, Nikola - Tamara, Soraja - Nirmal, Nemeš - Ema and Lester - Bojana - Marijana.
Week 6	Poisonous arrow	Dragana aimed her poisonous arrow towards Nirmal who had to perform 100 pushups to the song Dragana's song Primadona.
Week 6	Twists	The Housemates from the Dumps joined with the Housemates from the House.
Week 6	Exits	Lester, Slavica and the Person X (Tamara) were nominated by the public, and Slavica was evicted by the votes of her Housemates.
Week 7	Tasks	The European Union - after evictions, Soraja was invited to the Diary Room where Big Brother claimed her the European Union. Soraja chooses Horvat as another member state. Other Housemates would have to convince them why should they also join the EU. Duško, Ema, Nikola and Lester convinced them, so they joined the EU and received immunity in the next nominations.
Week 7	Poisonous arrow	Slavica aimed her Poisonous arrow to Marijana, who had to cook for all the Housemates and help Soraja to prepare any dish she wanted.
Week 7	Exits	Nemeš, Nirmal, Radašin and Tamara were nominated by their Housemates. Tamara received the most votes from the public and left the House.
Week 8	Entrances	Vladimir, Brandon and Antonia entered the corridor leading to the House, but somehow did not make it there. Later it was revealed that they entered the Lioness' Cave as superheroes.
Week 8	Tasks	Superheroines - as all the men were kidnapped from the House by the Lioness, the girls were given special powers to save their men. Bojana became Bo Bomb Lady, Soraja became Magical Miss Sara Frost, Marijana became Mystical Mary Keyholder, Antonia became Antoniella the Diva and Ema became Super-Dynamite Ema. The Lioness would put them on challenges and if they succeeded, the Lioness would release a number of male Housemates and allow them to return to the house.
Week 8	Twists	The Lioness broke into the House and conquered Big Brother, who became her servant. The Lioness also kidnapped Duško, Horvat, Lester, Nemeš, Nikola, Nirmal and Radiša and moved them to the Lioness' Cave where they were met with Vladimir and Brandon. She said she would look after them and make them work out to look sexier. She also told Bojana, Ema, Marijana and Soraja, who remained in the House, that they would have the chance to save some of the boys.
Week 8	Poisonous arrow	Tamara threw her poisonous arrow towards Duško, who would have to be silent until lunch. then he would be able to speak.
Week 8	Exits	Antonia, Ema, Nikola, Radašin and Vladimir were nominated. Ema received most of the votes of her Housemates and left the House.
Week 9	Entrances	Ema returned in return for €35.000 by Housemates' choice.
Week 9	Tasks	Romeo and Juliet Musical - Housemates had to practice and perform the musical version of Shakespeare's play Romeo and Juliet.
Week 9	Twists	Public nominations - Big Brother decided that the Housemates would nominate and the public would decide who would be evicted. The Nominations were public and held by throwing pies into faces of the Housemates that a particular Housemate wanted to nominate. Indecent proposal - Housemates had to choose between €35.000 or the return of a Housemate that has been evicted. If they choose an evicted Housemate the prize would be reduced for €35.000. The Housemates accepted the offer and forfeited the money.
Week 9	Poisonous arrow	Ema threw her poisonous arrow to Nirmal who had to serve Soraja and grant her every wish.
Week 9	Exits	Nirmal, Radašin and Vladimir were nominated by the Housemates. Radašin left the House by receiving the fewest votes from the public.
Week 10	Tasks	Hens - the Housemates had to disguise themselves as hens and look after ostrich eggs that Big Brother gave them. Later this task ended up as a fake task. The Weasel - Nikola was given a secret assignment as the weasel who had to steal three eggs from their Housemates in order to succeed and grant the rich budget for the next week. Living inside the box - Big Brother gave the Housemates boxes and survival kit as their new homes. They had to live inside the box and not leave at any cost. The Housemate who left his or her box would be disqualified from the task. Occasionally they had breaks when they could use the toilet and renew their survival kits. The Housemate that ended up the only one that lived in their box received Head of Household status and immunity in the next nominations.
Week 10	Poisonous arrow	Radašin threw his poisonous arrow to Duško who had to say good things about agricultural workers three times a day.
Week 10	Exits	Dražen returned home on Day 66 due to his health condition. On Day 66 Vladimir asked Big Brother to leave the house, but did not want to wait 24 hours, so he violated Big Brother's rules and Big Brother asked him to pack his things and leave the house. Antonija, Ema and Nikola were nominated. Ema was re-evicted.
Week 11	Tasks	The Royal Wedding - For the first time, Big Brother let some information from the outside world enter the house, and had the housemates recreate the Royal Wedding of Prince William and Catherine Middelton. Each housemate had a role as a member of the Royal Family.
Week 11	Twists	Public nominations - Big Brother decided that the Housemates would nominate, by burning a picture of the two housemates they would like to see evicted, and give the reason for the nominations.
Week 11	Exits	None, but Nemeš was fake evicted for an interview and then moved back into the Dumps where all of the other housemates were moved as well, as a part of the week 12's twist - The Fake Week.
Week 12	Entrances	All the evicted housemates came back in the house, while all of the housemates still in the competition were moved into the Dumps. The former housemates were only temporary moved back, as a part of the Fake week.
Week 12	Tasks	Toy Making - Housemates made some toys for children in need.
Week 12	Twists	The Fake Week - Besides making a fake eviction for Nemeš, Big Brother also provided some information from the outside world that was untrue. Big Brother also asked housemates questions they had to answer truthfully in order to win the €35.000 they 'spent' to move Ema back. The 'Don't push' button - In the Dumps, Big Brother set up a huge button with a sign 'DON'T PUSH'. Lester and Nikola were the first ones who decided to push it and later were awarded a 72-second phone call to anyone they wanted to hear.
Week 12	Exits	After being in the bottom four by the public vote, housemates evicted Brandon. After he was interviewed, the lines were open for the public to vote their favourite evicted housemate back in the house, and Brandon was moved back to the house the same night.
Week 13	Tasks	Balkan Song Contest 2 - All the housemates had to sing and perform covers of songs that Big Brother gave to them. Some choreographers and vocal trainers entered the house as well, to help the housemates prepare for the contest. The task is called BSC 2 because there was the same task during the fourth celebrity season of Veliki Brat.
Week 14	Tasks	N.N.L. dictature
Week 14	Exits	Duško, Brandon, Bojana and Marijana were nominated by the housemates. Bojana received the fewest votes from the public and left the house just one week before the final.
Week 15	Tasks	Pandora's box - All the finalists had visit time with their loved ones and families.
Week 15	Exits	During the last week there were two eviction nights. In the first one Lester, Nikola, Nirmal and Nemeš were еvicted. After this, there were five super-finalists left in the house. Soraja was the first super-finalist to be evicted and placed fifth. Brendon placed fourth, Horvat third, Duško second, and Marijana won.

== Voting history ==
The public voted whom to save from nomination. The three housemates with the lowest number of votes would be up for eviction. The housemates would then vote on whom to evict, with the first vote receiving two points and the second one point. The housemate with the most points was evicted. This year introduced a House Captain and a Dumps Captain who were immune from eviction and voted with double eviction points (the first vote receiving four points and the second two points.) The House Captain was awarded to the housemates residing in the main House while the Dumps Captain was awarded to the housemates who reside in the Dumps.

	Week 1		Week 2	Week 3	Week 4	Week 5	Week 6	Week 7	Week 8	Week 9	Week 10		Week 11	Week 12	Week 13	Week 14	Week 15	Final		Votes received
House Captain	none	Slavica	Bojana	Nirmal	Nikola	Nikola	Nemeš	none	Bojana	Horvat		Soraja	none			Lester; Nikola; Nirmal	none			Votes received
Dumps Captain	none			Bojana	Nemeš	Horvat	none													Votes received
Marijana	Duško; Ema	Lester; Ema	Mila; Lester	Tamara; Mila	Soraja; George	Dragana; Ema	Slavica; Lester	Radašin; Nirmal	Radašin; Vladimir	Vladimir; Radašin	George	Nikola; Ema	Bojana; Brandon	Nominated	Banned	Bojana; Duško	No; Nominations	Winner (Day 106)		16
Duško	Ema; George	Exempt	Milan; Lester	Mila; Slavica	George; Soraja	Dragana; Ema	Lester; Tamara	Nirmal; Tamara	Ema; Nikola	Nirmal; Radašin	Slavica	Nikola; Ema	Nirmal; Brandon	Nikola; Nirmal	Antonija; Bojana	Marijana; Brandon	No; Nominations	Runner-up (Day 106)		28
Horvat	Exempt		Milan; Mila	Slavica; Tamara	George; Soraja	Dragana; Nemeš	Tamara; Slavica	Tamara; Radašin	Radašin; Antonija	Nirmal; Radašin	Ema	Antonija; Ema	Brandon; Antonija	Nirmal; Brandon	Antonija; Bojana	Brandon; Bojana	No; Nominations	Third place (Day 106)		4
Brandon	Not in House								Nikola; Radašin	Vladimir; Radašin	Ema	Ema; Antonija	Nemeš; Antonija	Nemeš; Antonija	Bojana; Antonija	Bojana; Nemeš	No; Nominations	Fourth place (Day 106)		26
Soraja	Bojana; George	Bojana; George	Lester; Milan	Tamara; Slavica	George; Nirmal	Dragana; Nemeš	Lester; Tamara	Bojana; Nemeš	Radašin; Ema	Nirmal; Radašin	Mila	Ema; Nikola	Nemeš; Nirmal	Nirmal; Nikola	Bojana; Antonija	Marijana; Bojana	No; Nominations	Fifth place (Day 106)		43
Nemeš	Duško; Soraja	Ema; George	Milan; Mila	Mila; Tamara	Soraja; Nirmal	Ema; Dragana	Slavica; Lester	Radašin; Nirmal	Vladimir; Antonija	Vladimir; Radašin	George	Nikola; Ema	Banned	Banned	Banned	Bojana; Soraja	No; Nominations	Evicted (Day 104)		32
Nirmal	Exempt		Milan; Lester	Mila; Slavica	George; Soraja	Dragana; Nemeš	Tamara; Slavica	Nemeš; Radašin	Ema; Radašin	Duško; Soraja	Tamara	Antonija; Ema	Soraja; Duško	Soraja; Brandon	Soraja; Antonija	Horvat; Duško	No; Nominations	Evicted (Day 104)		35
Lester	Mila; Duško	Ema; Mila	Mila; Milan	Tamara; Slavica	George; Soraja	Dragana; Ema	Tamara; Slavica	Tamara; Marijana	Antonija; Ema	Duško; Antonija	Radašin	Antonija; Ema	Marijana; Nemeš	Brandon; Antonija	Antonija; Soraja	Duško; Marijana	No; Nominations	Evicted (Day 104)		30
Nikola	Soraja; Duško	George; Soraja	Milan; Mila	Slavica; Mila	George; Soraja	Dragana; Ema	Slavica; Tamara	Bojana; Radašin	Antonija; Ema	Brandon; Duško	Ema	Antonija; Ema	Nemeš; Duško	Nemeš; Brandon	Soraja; Bojana	Brandon; Duško	No; Nominations	Evicted (Day 104)		22
Bojana	Ema; George	Ema; Soraja	Mila; Lester	Mila; Tamara	Soraja; George	Dragana; Ema	Slavica; Lester	Banned	Ema; Nikola	Marijana; Nikola	Ema	Antonija; Nikola	Marijana; Nemeš	Nemeš; Brandon	Soraja; Antonija	Marijana; Brandon	Evicted (Day 99)			27
Antonija	Not in House								Banned	Vladimir; Radašin	~~George~~	Ema; Nikola	Brandon; Lester	Brandon; Nirmal	Bojana; Soraja	Evicted (Day 92)				38
Ema	Slavica; Duško	Soraja; Mila	Mila; Milan	Mila; Tamara	George; Nirmal	Nemeš; Dragana	Tamara; Slavica	Nemeš; Nirmal	Vladimir; Radašin	Evicted (Day 57)		Antonija; Nikola	Re-evicted (Day 71)	Guest	Re-evicted (Day 71)					66
Vladimir	Not in House								Banned	Nemeš; Marijana	Radašin	Ejected (Day 66)								13
Dražen	Slavica; Ema	George; Milan	Milan; Mila	Tamara; Slavica	George; Soraja	Hospitalized (Day 33-66)						Walked (Day 66)								4
Radašin	Not in House	Exempt	Milan; Lester	Tamara; Mila	Nirmal; Soraja	Nemeš; Dragana	Slavica; Tamara	Nirmal; Nemeš	Antonija; Ema	Brandon; Antonija	Evicted (Day 64)			Guest	Evicted (Day 64)					24
Tamara	Not in House	Exempt	Milan; Lester	Mila; Slavica	Soraja; George	Ema; Nemeš	Slavica; Lester	Banned	Evicted (Day 50)					Guest	Evicted (Day 50)					41
Slavica	Ema; Dražen	Ema; George	Mila; Lester	Tamara; Mila	George; Nirmal	Dragana; Ema	Tamara; Lester	Evicted (Day 43)						Guest	Evicted (Day 43)					39
Dragana	Exempt		Milan; Lester	Slavica; Mila	Nirmal; Soraja	Ema; Nemeš	Evicted (Day 36)													26
George	Duško; Soraja	Nikola; Ema	Lester; Milan	Slavica; Tamara	Nirmal; Soraja	Evicted (Day 29)								Guest	Evicted (Day 29)					36
Mila	Dražen; Duško	Ema; Dražen	Lester; Milan	Tamara; Slavica	Evicted (Day 22)									Guest	Evicted (Day 22)					43
Milan	Duško; Dražen	Dražen; Soraja	Mila; Lester	Evicted (Day 15)										Guest	Evicted (Day 15)					24
Notes																				
Nominated	Duško; Ema	Ema; George; Soraja	Lester; Mila; Milan	Mila; Slavica; Tamara	George; Nirmal; Soraja	Dragana; Ema; Nemeš	Lester; Slavica; Tamara	Nemeš; Nirmal; Radašin; Tamara	Antonija; Ema; Nikola; Radašin; Vladimir	Nirmal; Radašin; Vladimir	Dragana; Ema; George; Mila; Milan; Radašin; Slavica; Tamara	Antonija; Ema; Nikola	Brandon; Marijana; Nemeš	Brandon; Marijana; Nemeš; Nirmal	Antonija; Bojana; Soraja	Bojana; Brandon; Duško; Marijana	Brandon; Duško; Horvat; Lester; Marijana; Nemeš; Nikola; Nirmal; Soraja	Brandon; Duško; Horvat; Marijana; Soraja		
Walked	none										Dražen	none								
Ejected	none										Vladimir	none								
Evicted	Duško; 12 of 39 points to evict	Soraja; Dumps' choice to move	Milan; 23 of 57 points to evict	Mila; 21 of 57 points to evict	George; 23 of 54 points to evict	Dragana; 26 of 48 points to evict	Slavica; 18 of 42 points to evict	Tamara; 14.0% to save	Ema; 12 of 39 points to evict	Radašin; Fewest votes to save	Ema; 4 of 11 points to return	Ema; 15 of 39 points to evict	Nemeš; Most votes to fake evict	Brandon; 18.3% to save	Brandon; Most votes to return	Bojana; 12.3% to save	Nikola; Fewest votes (out of 9)	Soraja; 11.9% (out of 5)	Brandon; 14.6% (out of 4)	
Evicted	Duško; 12 of 39 points to evict	Soraja; Dumps' choice to move	Milan; 23 of 57 points to evict	Mila; 21 of 57 points to evict	George; 23 of 54 points to evict	Dragana; 26 of 48 points to evict	Slavica; 18 of 42 points to evict	Tamara; 14.0% to save	Ema; 12 of 39 points to evict	Radašin; Fewest votes to save	Ema; 4 of 11 points to return	Ema; 15 of 39 points to evict	Nemeš; Most votes to fake evict	Brandon; 18.3% to save	Brandon; Most votes to return	Bojana; 12.3% to save	Lester; Fewest votes (out of 8)	Horvat; 25.2% (out of 3)	Duško; 39% (out of 2)	
Evicted	Duško; 12 of 39 points to evict	Soraja; Dumps' choice to move	Milan; 23 of 57 points to evict	Mila; 21 of 57 points to evict	George; 23 of 54 points to evict	Dragana; 26 of 48 points to evict	Slavica; 18 of 42 points to evict	Tamara; 14.0% to save	Ema; 12 of 39 points to evict	Radašin; Fewest votes to save	Ema; 4 of 11 points to return	Ema; 15 of 39 points to evict	Nemeš; Most votes to fake evict	Brandon; 18.3% to save	Antonija; 11 of 27 points to evict	Bojana; 12.3% to save	Nirmal; Fewest votes (out of 7)	Horvat; 25.2% (out of 3)	Duško; 39% (out of 2)	
Evicted	Duško; 12 of 39 points to evict	Soraja; Dumps' choice to move	Milan; 23 of 57 points to evict	Mila; 21 of 57 points to evict	George; 23 of 54 points to evict	Dragana; 26 of 48 points to evict	Slavica; 18 of 42 points to evict	Tamara; 14.0% to save	Ema; 12 of 39 points to evict	Radašin; Fewest votes to save	Ema; 4 of 11 points to return	Ema; 15 of 39 points to evict	Nemeš; Most votes to fake evict	Brandon; 18.3% to save	Antonija; 11 of 27 points to evict	Bojana; 12.3% to save	Nemeš; Fewest votes (out of 6)	Marijana; 61% to win		

=== Notes ===
– House Captain
– Dumps Captain
– In the Dumps / Evicted to the Dumps

- ^1 The Housemates performed the nominations, but Big Brother decides which of the nominees would be evicted.
- ^2 Instead of being evicted, Duško was moved to the Dumps.
- ^3 Regular nominations, but the Housemates from the Dumps decide who will join them.
- ^4 The audience nominations housemates, and the housemates decide who will be evicted.
- ^5 All Housemates participated in the nominations, including the nominees and ones in the Dumps.
- ^6 Housemates from the Dumps, along with George, Nemeš and Ema (Red Team), competed against the other housemates (White Team) and won. As a reward, the Red Team received immunity and moved to the House. The losers moved to the Dumps and were nominated, except for Bojana, who received immunity for being the Dumps Captain.
- ^7 The public nominated housemates from the Dumps. All housemates decided who was evicted.
- ^8 Housemates from the House formed the Red Team, while the Housemates from the Dumps formted the Blue Team. The Blue Team won the competition in the Colosseum, was moved to the House and received immunity, while the Red Team had to move back to the Dumps and got nominated. Nemeš received immunity as the leader of the team. The public nominated three housemates from the Dumps, and the housemates decided who was to be evicted.
- ^9 Dražen was exempt from the House because he was injured during the Colosseum and ended up in a hospital.
- ^10 For Easter, Big Brother revealed only two nominated ones, the third one was the person X. Housemates had to nominate the third person as X so their identity would remain secret until the end. It was revealed that Tamara was X by Nemeš, the Head of the Household.
- ^11 As a part of the week task, Soraja, Horvat, Duško, Lester, Nikola and Ema received immunity for being a part of the European Union. Tamara and Bojana were exempt in these nominations and received one nomination as a punishment from Big Brother because of talking about nominations. In these nominations the Housemates nominated and the public decides who will be evicted.
- ^12 Vladimir and Antonia were nominated by Big Brother because of fighting. They were also banned from nominations. Brandon received immunity for being a new housemate.
- ^13 Nominations were held by throwing cakes in housemates' faces. Housemates did the nominations; the public decided who was to leave the house.
- ^14 Housemates accepted the offer from Big Brother to trade €35,000 in return for an evicted housemate. Housemates voted on who would return and chose Ema. Horvat's votes as the Head of Household were equal to others' votes. Antonija was banned from voting for being under the influence of Nemeš and Marijana to return George in the House.
- ^15 Nirmal received immunity for being Soraja's runner up in the battle for the House Captain.
- ^16 False public nominations. Falsely nominated were Nemeš, Brandon and Marijana.
- ^17 Marijana was automatically nominated for covering her microphone. She and Nemeš were also banned from nominations. Housemates nominated Brandon, Nemeš and Nirmal. The public decided who would leave the house.
- ^18 Brandon was evicted and nominated with the guest housemates for return. The public decided that Brandon should return to the House.
- ^19 Lester, Nikola and Nirmal received immunity and direct entry to the Final due to winning the Balkan Song Contest 2. Marijana and Nemeš were still banned from nominations.
- ^20 The housemates nominated and the public chose who would be evicted. Lester, Nikola and Nirmal were immune and gave double points as Dictators of the House.
- ^21 Four of noun finalists were evicted, five remaining became super-finalists on day 104.
- ^22 Super-final of Veliki Brat 2011 on day 106.

== Controversy ==
=== Breaking the Isolation ===
==== The live eviction incident ====
One of the main rules of Veliki Brat was that contact with the outside world was forbidden and that no new information should enter the house. During the first live eviction, when Marijana Mićić (the host) talked to the house, Nemeš started to show off and provoke her. In response, she put him down by saying that she and all of the viewers from five different countries saw what had happened between him and Marijana Čvrljak (the housemate) the other night. This was the first time that information entered the house.

==== Slaven ====
During the 21st day, an intruder entered the house. Tamara recognized him as her boyfriend, Slaven. Slaven shouted at her from the rooftop, saying he was angry due to her flirting with Nikola Maurović and that they should break up. He also shouted insults and threatened Nikola, and told Marijana that everybody saw the sex scene and that her father had renounced her.

Fans commented that the whole situation might be staged, since the house security had never been breached before, and it would be impossible to climb the roof and not get caught by the guards.

==== Vladimir's ejection ====
During the show, Vladimir decided he wanted to leave, and Big Brother told him that he had to wait 24 hours, and if he did not change his mind, he would be able to leave the house (the standard procedure). Vladimir did not want to wait, so he started breaking the house rules. He started giving out information from the outside world to the other housemates and Big Brother ejected him.

=== Nemeš and Marijana hate groups ===
After hooking up with Nemeš, Marijana became a target of cyber-bullying. Many groups about them were created on Facebook, some with up to 28,000 members.

=== Fix speculation ===
Some of the contestants, claimed that the show was fixed. When interviewed by the press following eviction, some former contestants said that Marijana was promised to get the prize money if she had sex during her time in the house. Both the press and the fans noticed that on a number of occasions Marijana had said "Ja sam svoj zadatak ispunila." (English: I fulfilled my task.), which they thought related to her affair with Nemeš.

Speculation around the show was common in previous years, but when Marijana won, forums and even some columnists claimed that the winner was not decided by the public vote. In addition to this, Croatian broadcaster RTL Televizija published news that Marijana had won before the voting lines were closed.
