= Nemes (disambiguation) =

Nemes is the striped headcloth worn by pharaohs in ancient Egypt.

Nemes may also refer to:

- Nemes (surname)
- USS Nemes (SP-424), a United States Navy patrol boat commissioned in July 1917 and sunk in August 1917
- Nemeš, stage name of Nikola Nemešević (born 1988), a Serbian singer-songwriter

== See also ==
- Nemes Furmint, a Hungarian wine grape
- Nîmes, a city in Gard, Occitanie, southern France
- Nemesis
- Neme (disambiguation)
- Memes
