= Big Brother 2008 =

Big Brother 2008 might refer to:

- Big Brother (Australian TV series) season 8, the eighth season of the Australian reality television series Big Brother Australia (2001–2008)
- Big Brother Brasil 8, the seventh season of the Brazilian reality television series Big Brother Brazil (2002–)
- Big Brother 4 (Bulgarian season), the fourth season of the Bulgarian reality series Big Brother Bulgaria (2004–)
- Big Brother Germany 8, the seventh season of the German reality television series Big Brother Germany (2000–)
- Bigg Boss 2, the first season of the Indian reality television series Bigg Boss (2006–)
- Grande Fratello 8, the eighth season of the Italian reality television series Grande Fratello (2000–)
- Veliki Brat VIP 2, the second season of the Serbian, Montenegrin, and Bosnia-Herzegovinian reality television series Veliki Brat (2006–)
- The second season of the Slovenian reality television series Big Brother Slovenia (2007–)
- Pinoy Big Brother: Teen Edition Plus, the second Teen season of Filipino reality television series Pinoy Big Brother (2005–)
- Big Brother: Celebrity Hijack, a spin-off of the British reality television show Big Brother UK
- Big Brother (British TV series) series 9, the ninth non-celebrity series of the British reality television show Big Brother UK (2000–)
- Big Brother 9 (American season), the ninth season of American reality television series Big Brother (American TV series) (2000–)
- Big Brother 10 (American season), the tenth season of American reality television series Big Brother (American TV series) (2000–)
- Big Brother Suomi 2008, the fourth season of Finland reality television series Big Brother Suomi (2005–)
