= Nemeš =

Nemeš Немеш
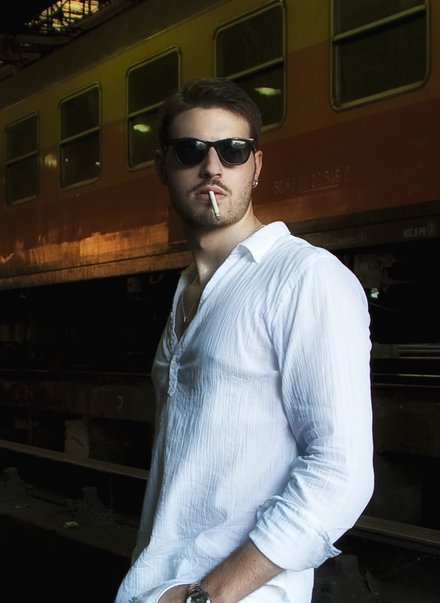

Background information
- Birth name: Nikola Nemešević
- Born: 18 November 1988 (age 36) Požarevac, SR Serbia, SFR Yugoslavia
- Origin: Požarevac, Serbia
- Genres: Adult contemporary music
- Occupation: Singer-songwriter
- Years active: 2010–present
- Website: http://www.nemesh.org

Nikola Nemešević (Serbian Cyrillic: Никола Немешевић; born 18 November 1988), better known by his stage name Nemeš (Serbian Cyrillic: Немеш), is a Serbian singer-songwriter and media personality.

== Biography ==
=== Personal life ===
Nemeš was born in Požarevac, Serbia to father Vojislav and mother Nada. He became known to wider audience in Balkans as the contestant of Big Brother.

== Career ==
=== Early beginnings ===
Nemeš started playing piano and keyboards with several bands while he was still in high school. One of the bands he continued working with is a pop-rock band called Bad Choice.

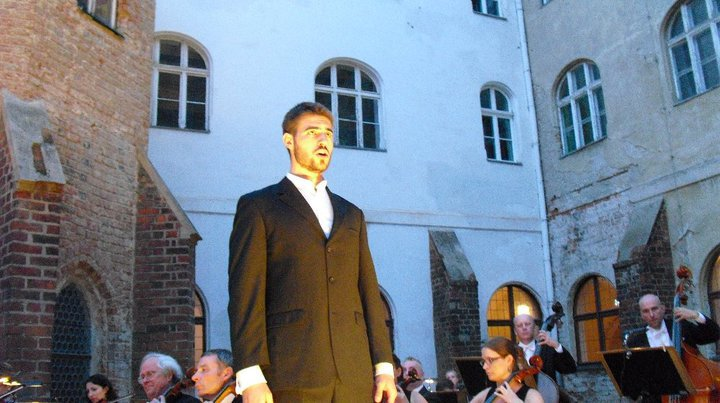
Nemeš performing in Beeskow, Germany in 2010.

=== Classical education and opera ===
After graduating music high school in Požarevac, he enrolled in the University of Arts in Belgrade where he studied and graduated in Opera singing. His singing professors were primadona Radmila Smiljanić and Nikola Mijailović (singer). He took part in several international opera festivals, including Oper Oder-Spree in Beeskow, Germany and International Summer Music School Pučišća, Croatia.

=== 2011: Znam taj smešak ===
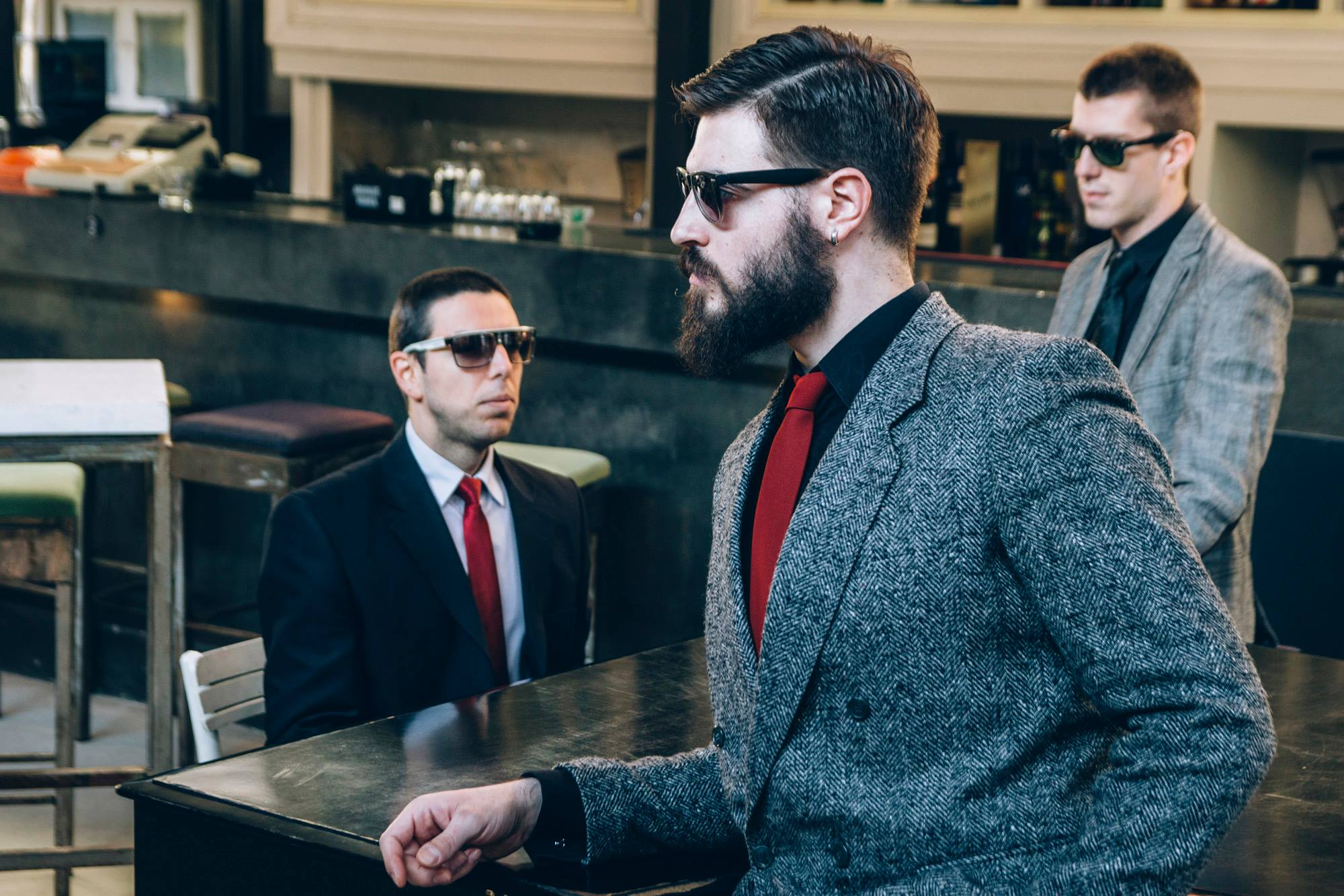
Nemeš & Tregeri in 2015.

In 2011. Nemeš released his first single called "Znam taj smešak". In less than a month, due to his participation in Big Brother and media exposure, the song gained over 3 million YouTube views.

=== Current bands ===
He is currently performing with his band called Tregeri. Their repertoire is based on evergreen, jazz and swing music.

=== Collaborations ===
In 2011. he worked with DJ/Producer Ivan Schwartz on a remake version of "Apsolutno Tvoj", song originally sung by band "Mirzino Jato".

In 2014. he wrote and recorded a cheering anthem called "Idemo BRE", written for National Basketball Team of Serbia in collaboration with Marko Kon.

== Media and TV ==
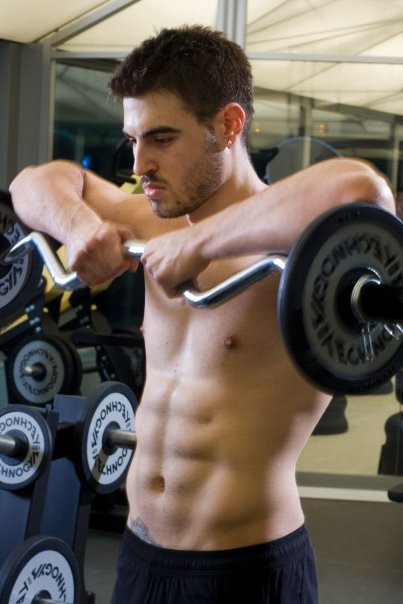
Men's Health photo session

=== Dancing With the Stars ===
In 2014. Nemeš was one of participants in Serbian version of Dancing With the Stars. He remained in the competition for 5 weeks.

=== Men's Health ===
In 2010. he was featured on the cover of Men's health magazine, after he won the Men's health fitness challenge.

=== Radio ===
In 2017. he started working on the TDI Radio Belgrade
