= Big Brother VIP (Serbian TV series) season 4 =

Big Brother VIP
- Season 4
- Presented by: Marijana Mićić; Dragan Marinković
- No. of days: 28
- No. of housemates: 14
- Winner: Milan Marić "Švaba"
- Runner-up: Anabela Đogani
- Participating countries: Serbia; Bosnia and Herzegovina; Montenegro; Macedonia

Release
- Original network: RTV Pink; Pink BH; Pink M; Sitel
- Original release: 30 January – 27 February 2010

Season chronology
- ← Previous; Season 3 Next → Season 5

Veliki Brat VIP 4 was the fourth season of the regional celebrity version of Veliki Brat. The airing starts on 30 January 2010. It was aired on four television channels in four countries: Pink in Serbia, Pink BH in Bosnia-Herzegovina, and Pink M in Montenegro and Sitel in Macedonia.

Celebrities from Serbia, Bosnia and Herzegovina, Croatia, Montenegro and Macedonia competed for €50,000. The host of the show is Marijana Mićić.

This season the house is split into two parts (rich and poor) and housemates are split into two teams.

The winner was Serbian actor Milan Marić, while the runner-up was singer Anabela Đogani.

== Housemates ==
All housemates entered the show on Day 1.

Name	Age on entry	Notability	Day entered	Day exited	Result
Milan Marić "Švaba"	28	Actor	1	28	Winner
Anabela Đogani	35	Singer	1	28	Runner-up
Bojan Jovanovski - Boki 13	23	Media personality	1	28	3rd Place
Lepa Lukić	70	Singer	1	28	4th Place
Ervin Katona	33	Strongman	1	28	5th Place
Andrija "Era" Ojdanić	62	Singer	1	28	6th Place
Alden Hadžikarić	30	Actor	1	27	Evicted
Mladen Marić	26	Manager	1	27	Evicted
Ena Popov	23	Singer, TV presenter and housemate on Veliki Brat 2006	1	27	Evicted
Divna Karleuša	52	Radio presenter and mother of Jelena Karleuša	1	27	Evicted
Bora Drljača	68	Singer	1	27	Evicted
Tamara Simić	24	Model	1	21	Evicted
Sanja Brnović	22	Model	1	14	Evicted
Ana Bebić	23	Singer	1	8	Evicted

== Nominations table ==
Housemates living in the rich side
Housemates living in the poor side

	Day 6	Day 14	Day 21	Day 27	Day 28 Final	
Milan	Anabela; Boki 13	Sanja	Tamara	No nominations	Winner (Day 28)	
Anabela	Boro; Era	Sanja	Ervin	No nominations	Runner-up (Day 28)	
Boki 13	Milan; Era	Ena	Tamara	No nominations	Third Place (Day 28)	
Lepa	Anabela; Milan	Alden	Ervin	No nominations	Fourth Place (Day 28)	
Ervin	Ana; Tamara	Sanja	Nominated	No nominations	Fifth Place (Day 28)	
Era	Boki 13; Anabela	Sanja	Tamara	No nominations	Sixth Place (Day 28)	
Alden	Ana; Tamara	Nominated	Ervin	No nominations	Evicted (Day 27)	
Mladen	Tamara; Ena	Ena	Tamara	No nominations	Evicted (Day 27)	
Ena	Ervin; Mladen	Nominated	Tamara	No nominations	Evicted (Day 27)	
Divna	Alden; Ana	Alden	Ervin	No nominations	Evicted (Day 27)	
Boro	Anabela; Boki 13	Sanja	Ervin	No nominations	Evicted (Day 27)	
Tamara	Mladen; Ana	Alden	Nominated	Evicted (Day 21)		
Sanja	Boro; Boki 13	Nominated	Evicted (Day 14)			
Ana	Ervin; Alden	Evicted (Day 8)				
Notes	1	2	2 3	none		
Up for Eviction	Ana; Boki 13	Alden; Ena; Sanja	Ervin; Tamara	All; Housemates		
Evicted	Ana; Most votes to evict	Sanja; 5 of 10 votes to evict	Tamara; ~~5 of 10 votes~~ Fewest votes to evict	Bora; Most votes to evict	Era; Fewest votes (out of 6)	Boki 13; Fewest votes (out of 3)
Evicted	Ana; Most votes to evict	Sanja; 5 of 10 votes to evict	Tamara; ~~5 of 10 votes~~ Fewest votes to evict	Divna; Most votes to evict	Ervin; Fewest votes (out of 5)	Boki 13; Fewest votes (out of 3)
Evicted	Ana; Most votes to evict	Sanja; 5 of 10 votes to evict	Tamara; ~~5 of 10 votes~~ Fewest votes to evict	Divna; Most votes to evict	Ervin; Fewest votes (out of 5)	Anabela; Fewest votes (out of 2)
Evicted	Ana; Most votes to evict	Sanja; 5 of 10 votes to evict	Tamara; ~~5 of 10 votes~~ Fewest votes to evict	Ena; Most votes to evict	Lepa; Fewest votes (out of 4)	Anabela; Fewest votes (out of 2)
Evicted	Ana; Most votes to evict	Sanja; 5 of 10 votes to evict	Tamara; ~~5 of 10 votes~~ Fewest votes to evict	Mladen; Most votes to evict	Milan; Most votes to win	
Evicted	Ana; Most votes to evict	Sanja; 5 of 10 votes to evict	Tamara; ~~5 of 10 votes~~ Fewest votes to evict	Alden; Most votes to evict	Milan; Most votes to win	

- ^1 Housemates are split into two teams. Each week housemates have to each nominate two members (of their own team) and the one from each team with the most nominations faces the public vote to save. As Anabela and Boki 13 had the same votes, Alden, as the team leader, chose Boki 13 to be up for eviction.
- ^2 This round of nomination was made by the public. The public voted for their favourite housemate and the three housemates with the fewest votes are nominated.
- ^3 Ervin and Tamara were tied with five votes each and the housemate with the fewest public votes would be evicted.
