= Soraja Vučelić =

Serbian model

- Сораја Вучелић
- Born: Soraja Sara Vučelić; 16 November 1986 (age 39); Knin, SR Croatia, SFR Yugoslavia
- Occupations: glamour model; media personality; Hostess
- Television: Veliki brat (2011); Veliki brat VIP (2013)
- Spouse: 1
- Children: 1

Soraja Sara Vučelić (Serbian Cyrillic: Сораја Сара Вучелић; born 16 November 1986), (Serbian Cyrillic: Сораја), is a Serbian-Montenegrin glamour model, media personality and socialite. She was a finalist on the fourth regular season of Big Brother Serbia in 2011, as well as on the fifth celebrity edition in 2013.

Additionally, Soraja was featured on the covers of CKM and Playboy in Serbia, Croatia, North Macedonia and South Africa.

== Biography ==
Vučelić was born on 16 November 1986 in Knin, SR Croatia out-of-wedlock and was put in an orphanage in Bijela, Herceg Novi by her mother, because she was not able to raise Soraja on her own. After receiving family inheritance at the age of nineteen, Soraja moved to Belgrade where she began modelling. In 2013, it was reported that Vučelić reconciled with her father, receiving an inheritance of €400,000 and real estate in Zadar and Knin.

On February 12, 2023, it was reported that Vučelić gave birth to a son named Kan, in Switzerland.

== Filmography ==
List of television appearances of Soraja Vučelić
Year	Title	Role	Notes
2011	Veliki brat	Herself	Season 4, 5th place
2013	Veliki brat	Herself	VIP season 5, 6th place
2015/2016	Kolo sreće	Herself	Hostess
