= Big Brother VIP (Serbian TV series) season 1 =

Big Brother VIP
- Season 1
- Presented by: Ana Mihajlovski; Irina Vukotić
- No. of days: 30
- No. of housemates: 13
- Winner: Saša Ćurčić
- Runner-up: Dragan Marinković
- Participating countries: Serbia; Bosnia and Herzegovina; Montenegro

Release
- Original network: B92; Pink BH; Pink M
- Original release: 5 May – 3 June 2007

Season chronology
- Next → Season 2

Veliki Brat VIP 1, is the celebrity version of Veliki Brat. The show premiered on May 5, 2007. It was aired on three television channels: B92 in Serbia, Pink BH in Bosnia-Herzegovina, and Pink M in Montenegro.

Celebrities from Serbia, Bosnia and Herzegovina and Montenegro are competing for €50,000. The hosts of the show were Ana Mihajlovski and Irina Vukotić. The show lasted one month.

== Housemates ==
Twelve housemates entered the show on Day 1. On Day 7, Aleksandar entered the house.

Name	Famous for...	Age	Day entered	Day exited	Result
Saša Ćurčić Đani	Retired football player	35	1	29	Winner
Dragan "Maca" Marinković	Actor	39	1	29	Runner-up
Danijel Alibabić	Pop singer	19	1	29	3rd Place
Olja Karleuša	Folk singer	26	1	29	4th Place
Ognjen Ivanović	Model	25	1	28	Evicted
Goga Sekulić	Folk singer	30	1	28	Evicted
Aleksandar Jovanović	Journalist	39	7	27	Evicted
Zorica Jocić Šujica	Painter	57	1	25	Evicted
Peđa D'Boy	Pop singer	57	1	25	Evicted
Emina Hamzabegović	Model	22	1	21	Evicted
Marta Keler	Actress	31	1	14	Evicted
Lazar Antić Big Lale	Illusionist	56	1	13	Evicted
Danijela Vranješ	Actress	33	1	6	Evicted

== Nomination table ==
	Day 7	Day 14	Day 15	Day 21	Day 25	Day 27	Day 29 Final		Nominations Received
Saša	Big Lale; Zorica	Emina; Peđa	Emina; Peđa	Emina; Peđa	Goga; Olja	Goga; Olja	Winner (Day 29)		17
Maca	Danijela; Big Lale	Big Lale; Marta	Aleksandar; Marta	Aleksandar; Emina	Aleksandar; Zorica	Aleksandar; Ognjen	Runner-up (Day 29)		5
Danijel	Saša; Zorica	Marta; Ognjen	Aleksandar; Marta	Aleksandar; Saša	Aleksandar; Saša	Ognjen; Saša	Third Place (Day 29)		8
Olja	Big Lale; Danijela	Big Lale; Marta	Aleksandar; Marta	Aleksandar; Saša	Peđa; Saša	Aleksandar; Saša	Fourth Place (Day 29)		6
Ognjen	Danijel; Emina	Danijel; Emina	Aleksandar; Marta	Aleksandar; Emina	Aleksandar; Danijel	Danijel; Maca	Evicted (Day 28)		3
Goga	Danijela; Marta	Big Lale; Marta	Aleksandar; Marta	Banned	Peđa; Zorica	Aleksandar; Saša	Evicted (Day 28)		5
Aleksandar	Not in House	Nominated	Emina; Maca	Danijel; Emina	Danijel; Goga	Danijel; Goga	Evicted (Day 27)		21
Zorica	Danijela; Olja	Emina; Marta	Aleksandar; Marta	Emina; Saša	Danijel; Peđa	Evicted (Day 25)			8
Peđa	Danijela; Saša	Big Lale; Zorica	Aleksandar; Marta	Aleksandar; Saša	Aleksandar; Zorica	Evicted (Day 25)			6
Emina	Danijela; Saša	Saša; Zorica	Aleksandar; Saša	Aleksandar; Saša	Evicted (Day 21)				11
Marta	Danijela; Goga	Maca; Olja	Maca; Olja	Evicted (Day 15)					13
Big Lale	Danijela; Saša	Saša; Zorica	Evicted (Day 14)						7
Danijela	Maca; Olja	Evicted (Day 7)							8
Up for eviction	Danijela; Saša	Aleksandar; Big Lale; Marta	Aleksandar; Marta	Aleksandar; Emina; Saša	Aleksandar; Danijel; Peđa; Zorica	Aleksandar; Saša	Danijel; Goga; Maca; Ognjen; Olja; Saša		
Evicted	Danijela; 83.2% to evict	Big Lale; 36.2% to evict	Marta; 60.4% to evict	Emina; 67.9% to evict	Peđa; Most votes to evict	Aleksandar; 80% to evict	Goga; 0.3% to win	Ognjen; 0.5% to win	
Evicted	Danijela; 83.2% to evict	Big Lale; 36.2% to evict	Marta; 60.4% to evict	Emina; 67.9% to evict	Peđa; Most votes to evict	Aleksandar; 80% to evict	Olja; 2.5% to win	Maca; 13.5% to win	
Evicted	Danijela; 83.2% to evict	Big Lale; 36.2% to evict	Marta; 60.4% to evict	Emina; 67.9% to evict	Zorica; Most votes to evict	Aleksandar; 80% to evict	Olja; 2.5% to win	Maca; 13.5% to win	
Evicted	Danijela; 83.2% to evict	Big Lale; 36.2% to evict	Marta; 60.4% to evict	Emina; 67.9% to evict	Zorica; Most votes to evict	Aleksandar; 80% to evict	Danijel; 8.7% to win	Maca; 13.5% to win	
Saved	Saša; 16.8%	Aleksandar; 32.4% Marta; 31.4%	Aleksandar; 39.6%	Aleksandar; 23.3% Saša; 8.8%	Aleksandar; Danijel	Saša; 20%	Saša; 74.5% to win		

== Tasks ==
Day 1 - VIP VeBevizija

Because 2007 Eurovision Song Contest is soon, Big Brother decided to make something like a Eurovision Song Contest where the housemates competed with songs that represented Yugoslavia, Serbia and Montenegro and Bosnia and Herzegovina. In three days, the housemates will have to prepare their songs and also the choreography that will be performed on the stage.

The competitors are:

1. "Brazil" (song that was originally performed by Bebi Dol for Yugoslavia) - Olja Karleuša and Ognjen Ivanović
2. "In The Disco" (song was originally performed by Deen for Bosnia-Herzegovina) - Danijel Alibabić, Gordana Sekulić and Emina Hamzabegović
3. "Zauvijek Moja" (song was originally performed by No Name for Serbia and Montenegro) - Saša Ćurčić and Pedja D'Boy
4. "Ludi letnji ples" (song was originally performed by Flamingosi) - Dragan Marinković, Zorica Jocić Šuica, Big Lale and Marta Keler

Danijela Vranješ was the host. During this task Emina and Gordana had a fight. The housemates passed this task.

Day 2 - I'm known for...

In this task the housemates had to perform something that they are known for. The housemates passed this task.

Day 5 - Boulevard of stars

In this task the housemates had to leave a print of the part of their body that they are most proud of in wet cement. And then they will have to hold a speech where they will thank everyone who helped them to become stars. The housemates passed this task.

Day 8 - I go to school

In this task the housemates once again went through second grade of primary school. Every day they had 4 classes. During this task they had to do things that little kids do (play games, wear school uniforms and they can't swear). The housemates passed this task.

Day 9 - Paparazzi

This task was a secret task. Aleksandar Jovanović had to take pictures of housemates and write articles about them, but the housemates can't find out what he's doing. He had 24 hours to do this task. Aleksandar didn't pass this task and he was nominated for eviction.

Day 12 - Tennis against Big Brother

The housemates played tennis against Big Brother. In the yard they had a tennis net and on the other side of the net machines that throw out tennis balls. The housemates played in pairs. The housemates get a point if they hit the tennis ball. The housemates passed this task and as reward they had a party next night.

Day 15 - VB Skandik Bank

In this task two housemates are the chefs of VB Skandik Bank, and all the other housemates are employees in the bank. The housemates will have 3 parts of this task and Big Brother told the chefs (Saša Ćurčić and Olja Karleuša) that they will pass this task if the employees of the bank pass 2 of those three parts of the task. The chefs also had a secret room in the house of Big Brother that was treated as their office (other housemates mustn't find out about the secret room or the task will be unsuccessful). But, that task was the fake one. Only the employees knew the real task, and the real task was not to pass 2 out of 3 parts of the task.

The first part of the task was to count money correctly. The employees tried really hard to sabotage this part, and they succeeded at that. The second part was to build a copy of the small building of Skandik bank. The employees again sabotaged the task. The third part was to invest money in some stocks. This time the employees didn't sabotage the task. By not passing 2 out of 3 parts of the task, the housemates passed the real task.

Day 20 - Sculptors

In this task Big Brother divided the housemates into 5 teams each consisting of two members. The task was to build a figure of their team mate out of clay. If they pass this task the housemates will have a party as a reward. The housemates passed this task.
