= Secret Story season 5 =

Secret Story (season 5) or Secret Story 5 is the fifth season of various versions of television show Secret Story and may refer to:

- Secret Story (French season 5), the 2011 edition of the French version.
- Secret Story 5 (Portugal), the 2014 edition of the Portuguese version.
