= Big Brother (Serbian TV series) season 3 =

Big Brother
- Season 3
- Logo for the third season of Veliki Brat
- Presented by: Marijana Mićić; Irina Vukotić; Dragan Marinković
- No. of days: 101
- No. of housemates: 18
- Winner: Vladimir Arsić Arsa
- Runner-up: Enis Mujabašić
- Participating countries: Serbia; Bosnia and Herzegovina; Montenegro; Macedonia

Release
- Original network: B92; Pink BH; Pink M; A1
- Original release: 21 September – 30 December 2009

Season chronology
- ← Previous; Season 2 Next → Season 4

Veliki Brat 2009 is the third season of the television reality show Veliki Brat, the Serbian, Bosnian, Montenegrin and Macedonian joint version of Big Brother. Macedonia joined the Veliki Brat for the first time, setting the record number of participating countries in Veliki Brat to four. The show started on 21 September 2009 and ended on 30 December 2009.

== Production ==
=== Theme ===
During the live launch, presenters said on more than one occasion that Big Brother will be two-faced. As a result of this Big Brother gave housemates many secret tasks, which sometimes meant stealing other housemates' items. During the diary-room interviews, Big Brother also pushed some of the housemates to their tipping points and didn't help them sort out their problems with other housemates or other sorts of issues they had.

Another example of Big Brother being two-faced is when the housemates had a chance to name two of the evicted housemates who'd they like to see back in the house, Big Brother moved one with the most votes (Danica), and one with the least (Tatjana). On one occasion there was even a fake eviction; the public voted who they want to fake evict, have interviewed and then move them back in the house. This housemate was Dragica. When she was interviewed she said nothing but the worst about the others in the house, what she didn't know was that the housemates hear and see all of this on the TV in the house.

=== The House ===
Due to the effects of the 2008 financial crisis, the house was purposely designed to look cheap. Most of the walls were covered in pipes, metal and plywood. There were also some misplaced bathtubs in the living room and the bedroom (some of the housemates used these as beds since the house had more housemates than sleeping places).

The bathroom was locked during the first week, so the housemates had to use one that was set outdoor, in the garden. There was also an outdoor shower, but with no hot water. The furniture was unavailable as well during the first week. Housemate sat on crates during this period. The first-week task prize was, besides the budget, winning the access to the bathroom, a crowbar and some house tools to open up the crates, and assemble the furniture which was in them.

=== Nominations ===
During Veliki Brat 3, nominations procedure was different from that of the previous years, in that the process was essentially reversed. Each week all housemates will face the public vote. The public voting for their favourite housemate. The voting closes on each Thursday. The three housemates that received the fewest votes will be nominated for eviction.

During the live eviction shows, the nominated housemates will face a house eviction vote to determine who will be evicted. Each housemate will vote on one of the nominated housemates they wanted to leave in the Diary Room. The housemate received the most votes is evicted the two housemates.

There were some variation in the rules:

- Weeks 2 and 3 had the previous nomination process (housemates nominate, and public voting to evict).
- Week 12 also used the previous nomination process, but for a fake eviction.
- Week 13 was a double eviction. The housemate with the fewest votes from the public was instantly evicted and the next two lowest vote recipients were nominated for a House eviction vote.
- Week 14 had the housemates vote for two of the nominees in the style of the old nomination system (3 Eviction Votes to be allocated in a 2/1 vote allocation).

== Housemates ==
12 housemates entered the house on launch night (Day 0), on 21 September 2009.

On 25 September (Day 4) Admir entered the house with a mission to periodically change with his twin brother, Enis, who entered the special intruder room.

On 3 October (Day 12) Enis entered the house as a housemate.

On 5 October (Day 14), the birthday of Big Brother, Dragica and Đorđe entered the house as presents to Big Brother.

On 19 October (Day 28), Karlo was brought back to the show. Violeta previously wished to see him and her twin sister, Kristina. Big Brother allowed her to see Kristina. Karlo and Kristina were asked to stay in the secret room, with a mission that could allow them to enter the house.

On 24 October (Day 33), Karlo and Kristina entered the house as temporary housemates. Only one of them was allowed to become a regular housemate. Violeta made that decision on October 26.

On 26 October (Day 35), Violeta decided to keep her sister, Kristina, but she was emotionally destroyed. After seeing that, Big Brother decided to keep Karlo in the house as well. Karlo and Kristina became regular housemates.

On 23 November (Day 63), housemates voted to enter two former female housemates. Danica and Indiana received the highest number of votes. After drawing a bigger card as a tie-breaker, Danica entered the house. Tatjana also entered the house, having received the fewest votes. The new housemate, Mirjana, also entered the house.

Out of 18 total housemates, 10 were from Serbia, 4 from Bosnia and Herzegovina, 2 from Montenegro and 2 from the Republic of Macedonia.

Housemate	Age on entry	Occupation	Residence	Day entered	Day exited	Status
Vladimir Arsić Arsa	23	Taxi driver and DJ	Užice	0	101	Winner
Enis Mujabašić	23	Student	Živinice, Bosnia and Herzegovina	12	101	Runner-up
Karlo Zagorac	32	Hairdresser and stylist	Belgrade	33	101	3rd Place
Karlo Zagorac	32	Hairdresser and stylist	Belgrade	0	7	Evicted
Jovana Joksi Pavlović	22	Artist	Kraljevo	0	101	4th Place
Đorđe Đurđević	27	Director	Banja Luka, Bosnia and Herzegovina	14	101	5th Place
Manuel Stojanović	22	Student	Pirot	0	101	6th Place
Danica Kordić	22	Student	Maradik	63	99	Evicted
Danica Kordić	22	Student	Maradik	0	28	Evicted
Radiša Miljković	49	Farmer	Ljupten	0	99	Evicted
Dragica Janičić	30	Writer	Nikšić, Montenegro	14	98	Evicted
Mirjana Stamenić	23	Nurse	Belgrade	63	91	Evicted
Kristina Raleva	19	Model	Skopje, North Macedonia	33	91	Evicted
Tatjana Jovančević	36	Hairdresser and stylist	Zemun	63	77	Evicted
Tatjana Jovančević	36	Hairdresser and stylist	Zemun	0	49	Evicted
Admir Mujabašić	23	Student	Živinice, Bosnia and Herzegovina	4	70	Evicted
Violeta Raleva	19	Student	Skopje, North Macedonia	0	42	Evicted
Nikola Dančević	25	Student	Zaječar	0	35	Evicted
Indiana Pejić	24	Fitness instructor	Banja Luka, Bosnia and Herzegovina	0	21	Evicted
Sandra Valterović	20	Singer	Novi Beograd	0	14	Evicted
Milan Boričić	26	Unemployed	Podgorica, Montenegro	0	8	Walked

== Nominations table ==
	Week 1	Week 2	Week 3	Week 4	Week 5	Week 6	Week 7	Week 8	Week 9	Week 10	Week 11	Week 12	Week 13	Week 14	Week 15	
Vladimir	Karlo	Nikola; Sandra	Nikola; Tatjana	Tatjana	Nikola	Kristina	Tatjana	No nominations	No nominations	Đorđe	Tatjana	Dragica; Karlo	Mirjana	Dragica; Radiša	Winner (Day 101)	
Enis	Not in House		Nikola; Indiana	Danica	Nikola	Violeta	Tatjana	No nominations	No nominations	Đorđe	Mirjana	Dragica; Karlo	Mirjana	Dragica; Radiša	Runner Up (Day 101)	
Karlo	Nominated	Evicted (Day 7)				Kristina	Tatjana	No nominations	No nominations	Admir	Tatjana	Vladmir; Manuel	Radiša	Radiša; Dragica	Third Place (Day 101)	
Jovana	Indiana	Sandra; Radiša	Banned; Nominated	Danica	Nikola	Kristina	Tatjana	No nominations	No nominations	Admir	Mirjana	Mirjana; Radisa	Mirjana	Radiša; Dragica	Fourth Place (Day 101)	
Đorđe	Not in House		Radiša; Danica	Danica	Manuel	Violeta	Kristina	No nominations	No nominations	Nominated	Tatjana	Vladimir; Danica	Mirjana	Dragica; Danica	Fifth Place (Day 101)	
Manuel	Karlo	Nikola; Violeta	Refused	Danica	Nominated	Violeta	Kristina	No nominations	No nominations	Đorđe	Mirjana	Karlo; Dragica	Mirjana	Dragica; Danica	Sixth Place (Day 101)	
Radiša	Karlo	Nikola; Sandra	Nikola; Vladimir	Danica	Nikola	Violeta	Kristina	No nominations	No nominations	Admir	Tatjana	Dragica; Karlo	Nominated	Nominated	Evicted (Day 99)	
Danica	Indiana	Nikola; Tatjana	Tatjana; Radiša	Nominated	Evicted (Day 28)					Đorđe	Tatjana	Đorđe; Radiša	Radiša	Nominated	Evicted (Day 99)	
Dragica	Not in House		Radiša; Nikola	Tatjana	Nikola	Violeta	Tatjana	No nominations	No nominations	Admir	Tatjana	Enis; Radisa	Radiša	Nominated	Evicted (Day 98)	
Mirjana	Not in House									Admir	Nominated	Dragica; Karlo	Nominated	Evicted (Day 91)		
Kristina	Not in House					Nominated	Nominated	No nominations	No nominations	Admir	Mirjana	Mirjana; Danica	Evicted (Day 91)			
Tatjana	Karlo	Nikola; Danica	Danica; Radiša	Nominated	Nikola	Violeta	Nominated	Evicted (Day 49)		Admir	Nominated	Evicted (Day 77)				
Admir	Karlo	Manuel; Sandra	Nikola; Indiana	Tatjana	Nikola	Violeta	Tatjana	No nominations	No nominations	Nominated	Evicted (Day 70)					
Violeta	Indiana	Manuel; Indiana	Banned; Nominated	Danica	Nikola	Nominated	Evicted (Day 42)									
Nikola	Indiana	Manuel; Radiša	Danica; Vladimir	Tatjana	Nominated	Evicted (Day 35)										
Indiana	Nominated	Radiša; Nikola	Radiša; Nikola	Evicted (Day 21)												
Sandra	Karlo	Jovana; Vladimir	Evicted (Day 14)													
Milan	Indiana	Walked (Day 8)														
Ivan	Evicted (Day 0)															
Dimitrije	Evicted (Day 0)															
Notes	1	2	3	4	5	6	7	8	9	10	11	12	13			
Up for eviction	Indiana; Karlo	Nikola; Sandra	Admir; Danica; Enis; Indiana; Jovana; Nikola; Radiša; Tatjana; Violeta; Vladimir	Tatjana; Danica	Manuel; Nikola	Violeta; Kristina	Kristina; Tatjana	None	None	Admir; Đorđe	Mirjana; Tatjana	Dragica; Karlo	Mirjana; Radiša	Danica; Dragica; Radiša	All Housemates	
Walked	Milan	none														
Evicted	Manuel; Most votes to enter	Sandra; Most votes to evict	Indiana; Most votes to evict	Danica; 6 of 10 votes to evict	Nikola; 8 of 9 votes to evict	Violeta; 7 of 10 votes to evict	Tatjana; 6 of 9 votes to evict	Eviction; Cancelled	No; Eviction	Admir; 7 of 11 votes to evict	Tatjana; 6 of 10 votes to evict	Dragica; Most votes to fake evict	Kristina; Fewest votes to save	Dragica; 10 of 18 points to evict	Danica; Fewest votes (out of 8)	Radiša; Fewest votes (out of 7)
Evicted	Manuel; Most votes to enter	Sandra; Most votes to evict	Indiana; Most votes to evict	Danica; 6 of 10 votes to evict	Nikola; 8 of 9 votes to evict	Violeta; 7 of 10 votes to evict	Tatjana; 6 of 9 votes to evict	Eviction; Cancelled	No; Eviction	Admir; 7 of 11 votes to evict	Tatjana; 6 of 10 votes to evict	Dragica; Most votes to fake evict	Kristina; Fewest votes to save	Dragica; 10 of 18 points to evict	Manuel; Fewest votes (out of 6)	Đorđe; Fewest votes (out of 5)
Evicted	Ivan & Dimitrije; Fewest votes to enter	Sandra; Most votes to evict	Indiana; Most votes to evict	Danica; 6 of 10 votes to evict	Nikola; 8 of 9 votes to evict	Violeta; 7 of 10 votes to evict	Tatjana; 6 of 9 votes to evict	Eviction; Cancelled	No; Eviction	Admir; 7 of 11 votes to evict	Tatjana; 6 of 10 votes to evict	Dragica; Most votes to fake evict	Mirjana; 5 of 8 votes to evict	Dragica; 10 of 18 points to evict	Jovana; Fewest votes (out of 4)	Karlo; Fewest votes (out of 3)
Evicted	Karlo; 6 of 11 votes to evict	Sandra; Most votes to evict	Indiana; Most votes to evict	Danica; 6 of 10 votes to evict	Nikola; 8 of 9 votes to evict	Violeta; 7 of 10 votes to evict	Tatjana; 6 of 9 votes to evict	Eviction; Cancelled	No; Eviction	Admir; 7 of 11 votes to evict	Tatjana; 6 of 10 votes to evict	Dragica; Most votes to fake evict	Mirjana; 5 of 8 votes to evict	Dragica; 10 of 18 points to evict	Enis; Fewest votes (out of 2)	
Saved	Indiana; 5 of 11 votes to evict	Nikola	Admir; Danica; Enis; Jovana; Nikola; Radiša; Tatjana; Violeta; Vladimir	Tatjana; 4 of 10 votes to evict	Manuel; 1 of 9 vote to evict	Kristina; 3 of 10 votes to evict	Kristina; 3 of 9 votes to evict	Eviction; Cancelled	No; Eviction	Đorđe; 4 of 11 votes to evict	Mirjana; 4 of 10 votes to evict	Karlo; Fewest votes to fake evict	Radiša; 3 of 8 votes to evict	Radiša; 6 of 18 points to evict Danica; 2 of 18 points to evict	Vladimir; Most votes to win	

=== Notes ===
- ^Note 1: Big Brother cancelled nominations in the first week and showed them to all housemates. Instead, the audience decided on the nominees while the housemates chose which of the nominees was evicted. The table lists nominations of housemates after the audience's votes. If nominations had not been cancelled, Radiša (6 votes), Manuel (3 votes), Milan (3 votes) and Sandra (3 votes) would have been nominated. Instead, Indiana and Karlo were nominated and Karlo was evicted after a close vote (6-5)
- ^Note 2: Admir could not be nominated this week due to being a new housemate. Since Enis was in the house at the time of nominations, he voted instead of Admir.
- ^Note 3: Due to the continuous breaking of the Big Brother rules, Violeta and Jovana are nominated this week and exempt from voting. Manuel refused to vote, resulting in all housemates being nominated, except himself and new housemates Dragica and Đorđe.
- ^Note 4: This week, Big Brother decided that there will be no nominations and the public will vote for their favorite housemate. Two housemates with the lowest number of votes will be nominated and the housemates will vote for eviction of one of them. The concept is identical to week 1 nominations.
- ^Note 5: Week 5 follows the same nominations concept as weeks 1 and 4.
- ^Note 6: Week 6 follows the same nominations concept as weeks 1, 4 and 5. Kristina was not exempt from voting even though she was the new housemate this week.
- ^Note 7: Week 7 follows the same nominations concept as previous 3 weeks.
- ^Note 8: Week 8 eviction was cancelled due to the days of mourning in Serbia following the death of Serbian Patriarch Pavle.
- ^Note 9: There was no eviction this week. Instead, 2 former and 1 new housemate entered the house.
- ^Note 10: Mirjana, Danica and Tatjana as new and returning housemates were exempt from nominations. The nomination procedure was the same as in most of the previous weeks.
- ^Note 11: The nomination procedure was the same as in most of the previous weeks.
- ^Note 12: The housemates nominated to evict (like in Week 2 & 3), however, the nominations were fake and the eviction would be fake. The public voted for whom to fake evict; Dragica was fake evicted, interviewed by the host, as the housemates watched from the house, and brought back into the house.
- ^Note 13: Kristina was evicted after receiving the fewest audience votes. The next two housemates with the fewest votes were nominated for eviction.
