= Nikola Mijailović =

Nikola Mijailović may refer to:

- Nikola Mijailović (footballer) (born 1982), Serbian footballer
- Nikola Mijailović (singer) (born 1973), Serbian baritone
- Nikola Mijailović (volleyball) (born 1989), Serbian volleyball player
