= Emotion Production =

Serbian media company

- Native name: Емоушн Продукција
- Type: d.o.o.
- Industry: TV production
- Founded: 2000; 26 years ago
- Headquarters: Kneza Višeslava 88, Belgrade, Serbia
- Key people: Željka Blagojević (Director)
- Products: Entertainment, TV Series
- Revenue: ▲€4.91 million (2017)
- Net income: ▲€0.46 million (2017)
- Total assets: ▲€6.21 million (2017)
- Total equity: ▲€5.04 million (2017)
- Owner: IMGS d.o.o. (50%); Prva TV d.o.o (50%)
- Number of employees: 5 (2017)
- Website: emotion.rs

Emotion Production (full legal name: Preduzeće za konsalting, proizvodnju radio i televizijskih programa i usluge reklame i propagande Emotion Production d.o.o. Beograd) is a Serbian media company with headquarters in Stari Grad, Belgrade. Emotion produces television content (mostly reality shows).

The company's ownership is 50% by IMGS which is owned by Goran Stamenković and The second company's ownership is 50% by Prva TV which is owned by Katarina Pavlović.

== Projects ==
In its portfolio it has some of the highest rated reality programmes (both licensed and independent) that air throughout the Balkans such as: Leteći start (on air since 2002), 48 sati svadba (on air since 2004), Big Brother, All You Need Is Love, Big Brother VIP, Operacija trijumf, Uzmi ili ostavi, Wife Swap, Marriage Ref, The Simple Life, Friday Night Project, Ant & Dec's Saturday Night Takeaway, I Love My Country, My Kitchen Rules, Zvezde Granda, Tvoje lice zvuči poznato, etc.

They also produced Žene sa Dedinja, TV Series which aired in the whole Balkans region. Additionally, the company is responsible for putting various individual personalizovane on the map such as Milan Kalinić, Ana Mihajlovski, Maca Marinković, Marijana Mićić and Katarina Šišmanović. Katarina left the company in November 2012 and Kalinić about a year earlier. Ana and Marijana still host Big Brother, while Maca is mostly active on other projects.
