= Nemes (surname) =

Nemes is a Hungarian surname meaning "noble". Notable people with the surname include:

- Sámuel Literáti Nemes (1796–1842), Transylvanian-Hungarian antiquarian
- Marcell Nemes (1866–1930), Hungarian financier, art collector and art dealer
- Oszkár Abay-Nemes (1913–1959), Hungarian swimmer
- Graciela Palau de Nemes (1919–2019), critic of Latin American literature
- Les Nemes (born 1960), English bass player
- Laszlo Nemes (born 1977), Hungarian film director
- Jason Nemes (born 1978), American politician
