= Big Brother VIP (Serbian TV series) season 2 =

Big Brother VIP
- Season 2
- Presented by: Ana Mihajlovski; Milan Kalinić
- No. of days: 30
- No. of housemates: 13
- Winner: Mimi Đurović
- Runner-up: Ajs Nigrutin
- Participating countries: Serbia; Bosnia and Herzegovina; Montenegro

Release
- Original network: B92; Pink BH; Pink M
- Original release: 1 March – 30 March 2008

Season chronology
- ← Previous; Season 1 Next → Season 3

Veliki Brat VIP 2 is the second season of the celebrity version of Veliki Brat. It started airing on March 1, 2008 on the television channels B92, Pink BH, and Pink M.

Celebrities from Serbia, Bosnia and Herzegovina and Montenegro were competing for €50,000. The hosts of the show were: Ana Mihajlovski and Milan Kalinić. The show lasted for 30 days and the final took place on March 30, 2008.

== Housemates ==
Twelve housemates entered the show on Day 1. On Day 15, Anastasija entered the house.

Name	Age on entry	Famous for...	Resident	Day entered	Day exited	Result
Mirjana "Mimi" Đurović	24	Fashion designer	Nikšić, Montenegro	1	30	Winner
Ajs Nigrutin (Note: Ajs and Skaj competed as a single Housemate known as Bad Copy for their first twenty-five days inside the House. During this time they were nominated and could be evicted as a pair. On Day 25 Big Brother split this connection and Ajs and Skaj became individual Housemates.)	30	Rapper	Belgrade	1	30	Runner-up
Milić Vukašinović	57	Musician	Belgrade	1	30	3rd Place
Petar Perović	29	Model	Belgrade	1	29	Evicted
Slađana Pejić	19	Model	Doboj, Bosnia and Herzegovina	1	29	Evicted
Skaj Vikler	27	Rapper	Belgrade	1	29	Evicted
Katarina "Kaja" Ostojić	24	Singer	Belgrade	1	29	Evicted
Andrija "Era" Ojdanić	60	Folk musician	Leskovac	1	28	Evicted
Anastasija Buđić	23	Model	Belgrade	15	28	Evicted
Borko Sarić	28	Actor	Belgrade	1	26	Evicted
Slobodan "Bićko" Bićanin	57	Actor	Belgrade	1	22	Evicted
Zorica Marković	48	Folk singer	Belgrade	1	15	Evicted
Maša Stanisavljević	27	TV presenter	Belgrade	1	8	Evicted

== Nominations table ==
	Day 8	Day 15	Day 22	Day 26	Day 30 Final	
Mimi	Maša; Borko	Borko; Milić	Milić; Borko	Milić; Borko	Winner (Day 30)	
Ajs	Competed as Bad Copy (Days 1-25)				Runner-up (Day 30)	
Milić	Bićko; Borko	Bićko; Zorica	Bićko; Borko	Borko; Bad Copy	Third Place (Day 30)	
Petar	Maša; Bićko	Bićko; Borko	Borko; Bićko	Borko; Era	Evicted (Day 29)	
Slađana	Maša; Mimi	Zorica; Bićko	Bićko; Bad Copy	Borko; Milić	Evicted (Day 29)	
Skaj	Competed as Bad Copy (Days 1-25)				Evicted (Day 29)	
Kaja	Maša; Borko	Zorica; Bićko	Borko; Bićko	Borko; Milić	Evicted (Day 29)	
Era	Bićko; Bad Copy	Bićko; Mimi	Borko; Milić	Bad Copy; Petar	Evicted (Day 28)	
Anastasija	Not in House		Bićko; Borko	Borko; Milić	Evicted (Day 28)	
Borko	Maša; Bad Copy	Petar; Mimi	Mimi; Petar	Mimi; Petar	Evicted (Day 26)	
Bad Copy	Borko; Petar	Slađana; Zorica	Era; Slađana	Milić; Era	Competing as individuals (Day 25)	
Bićko	Maša; Borko	Era; Zorica	Era; Milić	Evicted (Day 22)		
Zorica	Maša; Bad Copy	Bad Copy; Milić	Evicted (Day 15)			
Maša	Slađana; Borko	Evicted (Day 8)				
Up for Eviction	Borko; Maša	Bićko; Zorica	Bićko; Borko	Borko; Milić	Ajs; Anastasija; Era; Kaja; Milić; Mimi; Petar; Skaj; Slađana	
Evicted	Maša; 55.3% to evict	Zorica; 69.7% to evict	Bićko; 69.2% to evict	Borko; 61.6% to evict	Anastasija; Fewest votes (out of 9)	Era; Fewest votes (out of 9)
Evicted	Maša; 55.3% to evict	Zorica; 69.7% to evict	Bićko; 69.2% to evict	Borko; 61.6% to evict	Kaja; Fewest votes (out of 7)	Skaj; Fewest votes (out of 7)
Evicted	Maša; 55.3% to evict	Zorica; 69.7% to evict	Bićko; 69.2% to evict	Borko; 61.6% to evict	Slađana; Fewest votes (out of 7)	Petar; Fewest votes (out of 7)
Evicted	Maša; 55.3% to evict	Zorica; 69.7% to evict	Bićko; 69.2% to evict	Borko; 61.6% to evict	Milić; Fewest votes (out of 3)	Ajs; Fewest votes (out of 2)
Saved	Borko; 44.7%	Bićko; 30.3%	Borko; 30.8%	Milić; 38.4%	Mimi; Most votes to win	
