= Radmila Smiljanić =

- Радмила Смиљанић
- Born: 25 July 1940 (age 85); Banja Luka, Kingdom of Yugoslavia
- Occupation: Opera singer

Radmila Smiljanić (Serbian Cyrillic: Радмила Смиљанић; born 25 July 1940) is a Serbian classical and opera soprano singer who has had an active international career in operas and concerts since 1965. She has sung leading romantic roles opposite great artists like José Carreras, Mario del Monaco, Giuseppe Di Stefano, and Plácido Domingo.

She is particularly known for her portrayals of heroines from the operas of Giuseppe Verdi and Giacomo Puccini. She is living in Belgrade, Serbia for more than 25 year now.

== Career ==
Smiljanić studied singing at the Sarajevo Conservatory where she was a pupil of Bruna Spiler. She made her professional opera debut at the Sarajevo National Theatre in 1965 as Đula in Jakov Gotovac's Ero s onoga svijeta. That same year she won the international singing competition in Reggio Emilia, Italy; followed by competition wins in Ljubljana (1966) and Zagreb (1967).

From early in her career, Smiljanić forged strong partnerships with both the Sarajevo National Theatre and the National Theatre in Belgrade. She remained committed to those houses for more than 30 years. With the Belgrade Opera she toured to Lausanne in 1969 and 1977 and several times to Zagreb and Trient. She also appeared as a guest artist internationally with many important opera houses, including the Liceu (debut 1967), the Vienna State Opera (debut 1970), the Teatro dell'Opera di Roma (debut 1976), and La Scala.

Smiljanić currently teaches on the voice faculty of the Academy of Fine Arts, Belgrade. She taught for more than 20 years at the University of Arts in Belgrade where one of her students was her own son, internationally acclaimed baritone Nikola Mijailović.

She has been a member of the Managing Board of the leading Serbian media group Politika AD since 2009. She has also been a member of the Senate of the Republic of Srpska.

== Opera roles ==
The following are some of the roles which Smiljanic has created on stage:

- Aida, Aida (Verdi)
- Agathe, Der Freischütz (Von Weber)
- Amelia, Un ballo in maschera (Verdi)
- Antonida, A Life for the Tsar (Glinka)
- Cio-Cio San, Madama Butterfly (Puccini)
- Countess Almaviva, The Marriage of Figaro (Mozart)
- Desdemona, Otello (Verdi)
- Fiordiligi, Così fan tutte (Mozart)
- Judith, Bluebeard's Castle (Bartók)
- Leonara, Il trovatore (Verdi)
- Lisa, The Queen of Spades (Tchaikovsky)
- Liu, Turandot (Puccini)
- Mařenka, The Bartered Bride (Smetna)
- Marguerite, Faust (Gounod)
- Mimi, La Bohème (Puccini)
- Tatiana, Eugene Onegin (Tchaikovsky)
- Tosca, Tosca (Puccini)
- Turandot, Turandot (Puccini)
