= Big Brother (Serbian TV series) =

- 2015 Veliki Brat logo
- Also known as: Veliki Brat
- Genre: Reality television
- Created by: Endemol
- Presented by: Croatia Antonija Blaće (2011, 2015); Serbia Marijana Mićić (2006; 2009–2013); Ana Grubin (2007–2008; 2013); Irina Vukotić (2006–2009); Marina Miščević Trifunović (2006–2008); Milan Kalinić (2008–2009); Dragan Marinković (2010); Serbia Sky Wikluh (2015)
- Country of origin: Serbia
- No. of series: 5 regular + 5 VIP

Production
- Producer: Emotion
- Running time: 45 minutes (2006–2010; 2015); 75 minutes (2011–2013)
- Production companies: Emotion Production; Endemol

Original release
- Network: Croatia RTL (2011, 2015); Serbia B92 (2006–2009, 2015); Serbia Prva (2015); Bosnia and Herzegovina OBN (2015); Bosnia and Herzegovina RTRS (2015); North Macedonia Sitel (2015); Montenegro Prva (2015); Bosnia and Herzegovina BN (2013); Bosnia and Herzegovina Pink BH (2006–11); Montenegro Pink M (2006–2011); Serbia Pink (2011); North Macedonia A1 (2009)
- Release: 2006 – 2015

Related
- Big Brother

Veliki Brat (lit: Big Brother) was a Serbian version of the global reality show franchise Big Brother. The show was recorded and produced in Belgrade by Emotion Production.

Originally, the show began as a Serbian production with housemates from Serbia, Montenegro and Bosnia and Herzegovina. The third season also included housemates from Macedonia. For the fourth season Croatian broadcaster and producer RTL became involved, and auditions were held in Croatia, making the show Pan-regional.

In Serbia, the show was often broadcast by different channels. The first three regular seasons and three celebrity seasons were broadcast on B92 & Prva channel, while the other two celebrities and the fourth regular season were broadcast on Pink. In Montenegro the show is broadcast by Pink M and Prva, in Bosnia-Herzegovina by Pink BH, OBN and BN, in Macedonia by A1 and Sitel, and in Croatia the show is broadcast by RTL respectively.

After a one-year hiatus in 2012 and rumors of cancellation, producers announced that the show would be back in 2013 for a celebrity season. The fifth regular season was broadcast in late 2015.

== Format ==
Veliki Brat follows the format set for the franchise owned by Endemol. It is also modeled by the British format of the show. It is a game show in which a group of contestants, called housemates, live in isolation from the outside world in a custom-built house. On the launch night, 12 or more housemates move into the house of Veliki Brat. The house includes everyday facilities such as a fully equipped kitchen, garden, bedroom, bathroom, and additional rooms, although this may vary from season to season. The house is also a television studio with dozens of cameras and microphones in all of the rooms to record the activities of the housemates. The only place where housemates can escape the company of the other contestants is the "Diary Room", where they are encouraged to voice their true feelings with Veliki Brat and the producers.

Each week all housemates nominate two of their fellow contestants for potential eviction. Failure to do so may result in a punishment, such as a reduction in the prize fund. The two (or more) housemates with the highest number of nominations face a viewer vote conducted by phone, with the contestant receiving the most votes being evicted from the house. Occasionally more than one housemate may be evicted in a week. Each season lasts for approximately 100 days, and the winner is decided by a viewer vote. The prize fund is €100,000.

There are some fundamental rules that are never subjected to changes, but there are some rule changes that may be announced by the producers of the show. These new, changed rules are often referred to as twists.

=== Broadcasting ===
During the regular airing of each season, a daily highlights show is broadcast. The highlights show is simply referred to as Veliki Brat. From 2006 to 2011, the highlights shows' runtime was 45 minutes, while the later seasons' runtime was 75 minutes. Once a week there is a live eviction show, which is filmed in front of a live audience and is broadcast live. The eviction show incorporates the highlights shows along with eviction and interview of the housemate the public has voted to leave the house.

== Series details ==
=== Regular versions ===
Season	Launch date	Final date	Days	Housemates	Winner	Country debuts	Presenter(s)
Veliki Brat 1	15 September 2006	31 December 2006	108	19	Ivan Ljuba	Serbia, Montenegro, Bosnia and Herzegovina	Marijana Mićić
Veliki Brat 2	22 September 2007	29 December 2007	99	22	Aleksandar Kocić, Živan "Burek" Janićijević, Đorđe Stojanović, Nataša Ilić, Suzana Pavlović, Vesko Bošković, Vesna Milovac (Note: Season 2 originally set to finish at 106 days later on 5 January 2008, however the season was abandoned on 29 December 2007 after the deaths of three former housemates who got into a car accident. The winning prize money was split by the seven remaining housemates as if they were co-champions.)	None	Ana Grubin
Veliki Brat 3	21 September 2009	30 December 2009	101	18	Vladimir Arsić „Arsa”	North Macedonia	Marijana Mićić
Veliki Brat 4	13 March 2011	27 June 2011	106	21	Marijana Čvrljak	Croatia	Marijana Mićić & Antonija Blaće
Veliki Brat 5	6 September 2015	12 December 2015	100	21	Darko "Spejko" Petkovski	None	Antonija Blaće & Sky Wikluh

=== Celebrity versions ===
Season	Launch date	Final date	Days	Housemates	Winner	Presenter(s)
Veliki Brat VIP 1	5 May 2007	3 June 2007	29	13	Saša Ćurčić „Đani”	Ana Grubin & Irina Vukotić
Veliki Brat VIP 2	1 March 2008	30 March 2008	30	13	Mirjana „Mimi” Đurović	Ana Grubin & Milan Kalinić
Veliki Brat VIP 3	9 March 2009	6 April 2009	29	15	Miroslav „Miki” Đuričić	Marijana Mićić & Milan Kalinić
Veliki Brat VIP 4	30 January 2010	27 February 2010	29	14	Milan Marić „Švaba”	Marijana Mićić
Veliki Brat VIP 5	25 March 2013	6 May 2013	43	17	Žarko Stojanović	Marijana Mićić

== The show ==
=== Eye, titles and theme tune ===
The eye logo for season one was a reused version of the eye from Big Brother UK 6. For other seasons the same eye logo was used, but in different colours, and for the celebrity editions, a star is inserted where the eye pupil should be.

The opening titles are also taken from the Big Brother UK 6, but with a different theme tune over the titles. The theme tune is written by Marko Milicević, then credited as Marko Hollywood.

A modified version of the Big Brother UK 11 titles and logo have been used for the 2011 Serbian season.

=== The house ===
The house is located in Belgrade, in the urban neighborhood of Košutnjak. The house itself has not been remodeled since it was built in 2006, but the interior is redesigned for every season. Originally, it consisted of two bedrooms, one living room, a kitchen and a dining room, a diary room, a bathroom, a storage room, a garden and extra rooms which are sometimes used as task rooms or secret rooms for new housemates. For the third season, the wall between male and female bedroom was knocked down, so there was only one big bedroom. During the same season another room was added, the relaxation room (also known as the "make out" room).

=== The diary room interviews ===
The diary room is actually called "ispovedaonica", which is Serbian for confessional. The main difference between the diary room interviews in Veliki Brat and other Big Brother season (including the UK edition) is in Big Brother's "voice". Unlike most of the diary room interviews, in which the voices of the producers can be heard, in Veliki Brat the producers' voices are processed, giving the illusion that Big Brother always speaks in the same robotic way.

=== Big Brother UK ===
Veliki Brat very much follows the way Big Brother UK is produced. For example, when a housemate is talking about another housemate in the Diary Room, the camera will cut to a clip of the housemate who is being talked about while one can still hear the speech of the housemate in the diary room.

Between clips of the past 24-hour highlights, quick bumpers show events related to the title sequence.

When introducing a new day, the narrator will say the day number, time and if there has been any previous matters that relate to the episode. The narrator, throughout the episode, will say the time and what certain housemates are doing. The only difference between the UK and Serbian versions in this aspect is that the UK narrator, Marcus Bentley, is male and the Serbian narrator is female. When the time and day are shown, it is shown on the same background as the UK version, but in different colours depending on the series.

=== Season 5 ===
In early January 2013, Croatian broadcaster RTL announced that they would be airing a fifth season of the show, and that producers from Emotion, the production company that owns the licence for the Serbian franchise of the show, would also be involved, therefore making it a joint venture much like the last broadcast season. Producers from Emotion said that they were interested in having the auditions in Slovenia as well as the other previous locations, which would set the number of participating countries to a new high of 6, making it the first TV series to include all of the former Yugoslav countries. It is expected to follow the new format of Big Brother UK.

After a 2-year hiatus, the fifth season of Veliki Brat premiered on 5 September 2015.

== See also ==
- Parovi
- Zadruga (TV series)
- Farma (Sebrian TV series)
