= Secret Story (French TV series) season 5 =

Secret Story
- Season 5
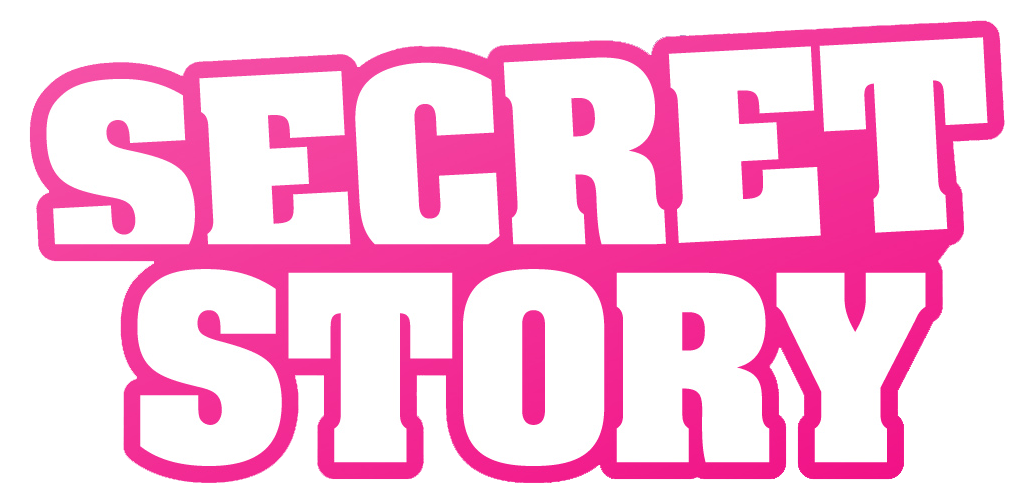
- Presented by: Benjamin Castaldi; Adrien Lemaître (After Secret)
- No. of days: 99
- No. of housemates: 19
- Winner: Marie
- Runner-up: Zelko
- Companion show: After Secret

Release
- Original network: TF1
- Original release: 8 July – 14 October 2011

Season chronology
- ← Previous; Season 4 Next → Season 6

Secret Story 5 is the fifth edition of the French reality show Secret Story. It started on July 8 at 8:45 pm on TF1 and concluded on October 14, 2011, lasting 98 days. The winner of this season is Marie Garet.

== Housemates ==
=== Anthony ===
He is 26 years old, from Narbonne in France. On Day 1, during the first gala, he was nominated with Elizabeth in the « crystal ball ». He won his place in the House of Secrets with 75% to enter, but after only one week, he was evicted on Day 7 with 10% to save. His secret was not discovered by the other housemates during the show. His secret is : « I am a marksman ».

=== Aurélie ===
She is 23 years old, from Belgium. She entered the House of Secrets on Day 1 with Geof, her boyfriend, but The Voice gave her a mission to protect her secret during the first gala : to pretend to be in couple with Geoffrey, Marie's boyfriend, until the end of the show. During the show, she broke up with Geof, and she had a short love affair with Rudy (because he was evicted on Week 3). On Week 6, during the gala, she won the power of nominations, and she decided to nominate Ayem, Juliette, Daniel and Simon. Her secret was discovered by Sabrina on Week 10. In Week 11, Juliette who had won the power of eviction, eliminated Aurélie. But, in reality, she sent her in the Secret Room without knowing it (only Marie and Geoffrey know this) and Aurélie became the master of nominations this week. She decided during the gala to nominate Juliette, Sabrina and Zelko. In Week 13, Marie solved the Secret of the House and wion a place in the final but she gave this place to Aurélie after a dilemma. She finished in third place in the final with 9,2%. Her secret is : « We are in couple », sharing with Geof.

=== Ayem ===
Ayem came to fame when she was 22 years old. She is from Lyon, France. She joined the "House of Secrets" on Day 1 and had to fake being in a relationship with another contestant she had never met before. At first, she didn't even know which contestant she was supposed to pair with. On Week 1, she was able to figure out who her partner was, and both he, named Daniel, and she started acting accordingly. She was nominated twice by the two "Masters of the Underground", Zelko and Zarko. Although they nominated her on Week 1 and 2, Ayem was saved by the audience with 33% and 45% of the votes, respectively. On Week 5, she was nominated by Juliette, who was in the Secret Room. However, she was saved by the audience again with 41% of the votes. On Week 7, her secret was discovered by Zelko, but Daniel and she pursued their relationship. After the last gala, she was nominated by Aurélie, who had won the power of nominations. She was saved by the audience once again with 18.7% of the votes, but Daniel, who had become her boyfriend, was sent home. On Week 8, she was nominated because she was in the Nomination House but was saved by the audience with 19.76% of the votes. On Week 10, she was eventually eliminated instead of Zelko. Her (and Daniel's) secret was : We are a fake couple.

=== Daniel ===
He is 21 years. He enters the house on Day 1. His secret is to be a fake couple with Ayem.

In January 2012 he participated in Grande Fratello (season 12) (Day 78-92, ejected by Big Brother).

=== Elizabeth ===
Elizabeth is 20. Her secret is that she is gifted. She entered on the Cristal Ball and she was nominated with Anthony. She lost her place in the House with 25%. She was evicted on Day 1.

=== Geof ===
He is 26, from Brussels in Belgium. He is in a relationship with Aurélie, but is pretending to be married to Marie to protect the secret.

=== Geoffrey ===
He is 23, from Montpellier, France. He is married to Marie, although to protect this secret he is pretending to be in a relationship with Aurélie, who is actually in a relationship with Geof.

=== Jonathan ===
He is 26, and he is from Nice. His secret is that he is a Freemason.

=== Julie ===
She is 23. She was evicted on Day 15.

=== Juliette ===
She is 20 years. She enters the house on Day 1. She was evicted on Day 85.

=== Marie ===
Marie was 26 years old when she joined the "House of Secrets". She is from Montpellier, France. Her secret was that she was in a relationship with Geoffrey. To protect her secret, she had to pretend to be in a relationship with another contestant, Geof, himself involved with another competitor, Aurélie. Vice versa, Aurélie had to pretend to be in relationship with Geoffrey. Even though Marie went through a lot on the show, she triumphed and was proclaimed the winner of Secret Story's season 5. She was among the final four contestants along with Zelko, Aurélie and Geoffrey.

=== Marie-Josée ===
She is 39. Her secret is that she was a nun. She walked Day 9 because she missed her son.

=== Morgan ===
He is 21. His secret is to be a cheerleader. He lives in Toulouse (France).

=== Morgane « Mogo » ===
Her secret is that her father is called Brigitte. She was evicted on Day 92.

=== Rudy ===
He's 21. He discovers half of Sabrina's secret on Day 20. He has a relation with Aurélie.

=== Sabrina ===
She is 30. Her secret is that she lives with someone else's lungs due to a disease that nearly took her life.

=== Simon ===
He entered the house on Day 1. He is 20 years old.

=== Zarko ===
He is 23 years and Zelko is his twin from Serbia. He enters the house on Day 0, before the other housemates with his brother, on the "Underground Labyrinth".

=== Zelko ===
He is 23 years and Zarko is his twin from Serbia. He enters the house on Day 0, before the other housemates with his brother, on the "Underground Labyrinth".

== Secrets ==
Name	Age	Country	Secrets	Discovered by	Stats
Marie	26	France	« We are a couple » (sharing with Geoffrey)	~~Zelko~~	Winner
Zelko	23	Serbia	« We are the Masters of the Underground »	Ayem + Aurélie	Runner-Up
Aurélie	23	Belgium	« We are a couple » (sharing with Geof)	Sabrina	Finalist (Day 98)
Geoffrey	23	France	« We are a couple » (sharing with Marie)	~~Zelko~~	Finalist (Day 98)
Morgane	21	France	« The name of my father is Brigitte »	Juliette	Evicted (Day 92)
Juliette	20	France	« I sleepwalk »	Undiscovered	Evicted (Day 85)
Sabrina	30	France	« I live with someone else's lungs »	Rudy + Geof	Evicted (Day 78)
Geof	27	Belgium	« We are a couple » (sharing with Aurélie)	Sabrina	Evicted (Day 71)
Ayem	22	France	« We are a fake couple »	Zelko	Evicted (Day 64)
Simon	20	France	« I am the key of the house's secret »	Undiscovered	Evicted (Day 57)
Daniel	21	Switzerland	« We are a fake couple »	Zelko	Evicted (Day 50)
Zarko	23	Serbia	« We are the Masters of the Underground »	Simon + Aurélie	Evicted (Day 43)
Jonathan	26	France	« I am Freemason »	Undiscovered	Evicted (Day 36)
Morgan	21	France	« I am a cheerleader »	Simon	Evicted (Day 29)
Rudy	21	France	« I am a mythomaniac »	Undiscovered	Evicted (Day 22)
Julie	23	France	« The queen of pop broke my couple »	Undiscovered	Evicted (Day 15)
Marie-Josée	39	Canada	« I was a nun »	Undiscovered	Walked (Day 9)
Anthony	26	France	« I am marksman »	Undiscovered	Evicted (Day 8)
Elizabeth	20	France	« I am gifted »	Undiscovered	Evicted (Day 1)

== Nominations ==
Nominations follow a different formula than is typical of the Big Brother franchise. Each week the housemates alternate nominations: male housemates nominate female housemates one week, and female housemates nominate male housemates the following week. In some weeks housemates are only permitted to nominate one housemate, rather than the typical two; this, usually occurs when at least one housemate has been already nominated by La Voix (Big Brother). Also, during some weeks, twist occur which affect the nomination procedure.

	Week 1		Week 2	Week 3	Week 4	Week 5	Week 6	Week 7	Week 8	Week 9	Week 10	Week 11	Week 12	Week 13	Week 14 Final	
	Day 1	Day 5	Week 2	Week 3	Week 4	Week 5	Week 6	Week 7	Week 8	Week 9	Week 10	Week 11	Week 12	Week 13	Week 14 Final	
Marie	No; Nominations	Anthony; Daniel	Not; Eligible	Zelko; Rudy	Geof	Exempt	Zelko; Zarko	Not; Eligible	Immune; House	Zelko	No; Nominations	No; Nominations	Juliette	No nominations	Winner (Day 99)	
Zelko	No; Nominations	Ayem	Juliette; Morgane	Not; Eligible	Not; Eligible	Not; Eligible	Not; Eligible	Exempt	Nomination; House	~~Juliette~~; ~~Marie~~	Nominated	Nominated	Marie	No nominations	Runner-Up (Day 99)	
Aurélie	No; Nominations	Anthony; Daniel	Not; Eligible	Zelko; Jonathan	Geof	Exempt	Zelko; Geoffrey	Juliette; Simon; Ayem; Daniel	Immune; House	Not; Eligible	No; Nominations	Juliette; Sabrina; Zelko	Juliette	Exempt	Third place (Day 99)	
Geoffrey	No; Nominations	Not; Eligible	Morgane; Julie	Not; Eligible	Nominated	In Secret Room	Not; Eligible	Not; Eligible	Immune; House	~~Juliette~~; Ayem	No; Nominations	No; Nominations	Juliette	No nominations	Fourth place (Day 99)	
Morgane	No; Nominations	Geof; Zelko	Not; Eligible	Zelko; Rudy	Simon	Nominated	Simon; Geoffrey	Not; Eligible	Immune; House	Not; Eligible	No; Nominations	No; Nominations	Marie	No nominations	Evicted (Day 92)	
Juliette	No; Nominations	Geoffrey; Zelko	Not; Eligible	Zelko; Morgan	Geof	Morgane; Ayem	Zelko; Zarko	Nominated	Nomination; House	Exempt	No; Nominations	Nominated	Marie	Evicted (Day 85)		
Sabrina	No; Nominations	Jonathan; Daniel	Not; Eligible	Zelko; Rudy	Simon	Not; Eligible	Zelko; Zarko	Not; Eligible	Immune; House	Not; Eligible	No; Nominations	Nominated	Evicted (Day 78)			
Geof	No; Nominations	Not; Eligible	Morgane; Juliette	Not; Eligible	Not; Eligible	Not; Eligible	Not; Eligible	Not; Eligible	Immune; House	~~Juliette~~; Ayem	Nominated	Evicted (Day 71)				
Ayem	No; Nominations	Anthony; Zelko	Nominated; Forever	Zelko; Geof	Simon	Nominated	Zelko; Zarko	Nominated	Nomination; House	Not; Eligible	Evicted (Day 64)					
Simon	No; Nominations	Not; Eligible	Marie; Julie	Not; Eligible	Not; Eligible	Not; Eligible	Not; Eligible	Nominated	Nomination; House	Evicted (Day 57)						
Daniel	No; Nominations	Not; Eligible	Marie; Julie	Not; Eligible	Not; Eligible	Not; Eligible	Not; Eligible	Nominated	Evicted (Day 50)							
Zarko	No; Nominations	Ayem	Juliette; Morgane	Nominated; Forever	Nominated; Forever	Not; Eligible	Not; Eligible	Evicted (Day 43)								
Jonathan	No; Nominations	Not; Eligible	Juliette; Sabrina	Zarko	Not; Eligible	Nominated	Evicted (Day 36)									
Morgan	No; Nominations	Not; Eligible	Juliette; Julie	Not; Eligible	Nominated	Evicted (Day 29)										
Rudy	No; Nominations	Not; Eligible	Marie; Julie	Not; Eligible	Evicted (Day 22)											
Julie	No; Nominations	Daniel; Simon	Not; Eligible	Evicted (Day 15)												
Marie-Josée	No; Nominations	Rudy; Simon	Walked (Day 9)													
Anthony	Nominated	Not; Eligible	Evicted (Day 8)													
Elizabeth	Nominated	Evicted (Day 1)														
Up for eviction	Anthony; Elizabeth	Anthony; Ayem; Daniel; Zelko	Ayem; Julie; Juliette	Rudy; Zarko; Zelko	Geof; Geoffrey; Morgan; Simon; Zarko	Ayem; Jonathan; Morgane	Zarko; Zelko	Ayem; Daniel; Juliette; Simon	Ayem; Juliette; Simon; Zelko	Ayem; Zelko	Geof; Zelko	Juliette; Sabrina; Zelko	Juliette; Marie	Geoffrey; Marie; Morgane; Zelko	All housemates	
Nomination Notes	1	2, 3	4, 5	6	7, 8, 9; 10	11, 12, 13	14	15	16	17	18	19	none	20	none	
Walked	none		Marie-Josée	none												
Evicted	Elizabeth; 25% to enter	Anthony; 10% to save	Julie; 13% to save	Rudy; 10.5% to save	Morgan; 12.2% to save	Jonathan; 28% to save	Zarko; 41% to save	Daniel; 18.1% to save	Simon; 18.9% to save	Ayem; 17% to save	Geof; 41.6% to save	Sabrina; 17.1% to save	Juliette; 12.4% to save	Morgane; 9.4% to save	Geoffrey; 2.7% to win	Aurélie; 9.2% to win
Evicted	Elizabeth; 25% to enter	Anthony; 10% to save	Julie; 13% to save	Rudy; 10.5% to save	Morgan; 12.2% to save	Jonathan; 28% to save	Zarko; 41% to save	Daniel; 18.1% to save	Simon; 18.9% to save	Ayem; 17% to save	Geof; 41.6% to save	Sabrina; 17.1% to save	Juliette; 12.4% to save	Morgane; 9.4% to save	Zelko; 43.1% to win	Marie; 45% to win

Nominated forever.
In Secret Room.

^Note 1: Anthony and Elizabeth are nominated to enter the House. Viewers have to choose who deserves to enter the house with his/her secret.

^Note 2: Zarko and Zelko could nominate one housemate forever until the eviction of the housemate that they chose.

^Note 3: In week one of nominations, only female housemates could nominate.

^Note 4: Ayem does not discover who is responsible for her nomination forever. She is definitely nominated until her eviction.

^Note 5: In week two of nominations, only male housemates could nominate.

^Note 6: In week three of nominations, only female housemates could nominate.

^Note 7: To protect his secret and not lose money, Rudy accepts giving Aurélie immunity.

^Note 8: To protect his secret, Morgan accepts nominating Geoffrey.

^Note 9: To protect their secrets, Zarko, Zelko and Rudy accept nominating Morgan.

^Note 10: In week four of nominations, only female housemates could nominate. They have to nominate only one male housemate.

^Note 11: Juliette is in the Secret Room, and she has the power to be the only housemate to nominate two female housemates. Nobody knows that Juliette is in the Secret Room. They think she has been evicted by the Red Phone.

^Note 12: After an easy dilemma, Zarko deletes his nomination forever.

^Note 13: La Voix has announced that two housemates will be evicted on Day 29. Actually, only one housemate (Morgan). All housemates think that Morgan and Geoffrey are evicted. But Geoffrey is in the Secret Room with Juliette, and he can help her choose the two female housemates that Juliette must nominate on Tuesday (Day 33).

^Note 14: In week six of nominations, only female housemates could nominate.

^Note 15: In week seven of nominations, Aurelie is the only one responsible for nominations.

^Note 16: In week eight, the contestants are separated into two Houses: The Immune House and The Nomination House. But transfers of contestants take place during the week. Finally, Juliette, Simon, Ayem and Zelko are nominated because they are in the Nomination House at the end of this transfer.

^Note 17: In week nine, Juliette and Ayem are normally nominated. But Juliette is immune because she solved an enigma of the corridor of 4 elements. Marie is the third girl who topped the appointment, she replaces Juliette. But Marie has a Joker card, she nominates Zelko be eliminated in the place of Ayem.

^Note 18: Geof has revealed Geoffrey and Marie's secret, he cheated and asked Zelko to buzz Geoffrey and Marie's secret. Geof and Zelko are nominated by La Voix.

^Note 19: In week eleven, Juliette has the power of elimination and eliminates Aurélie. But, in reality, Aurélie is in the Secret Room (only Marie and Geoffrey know this) and she becomes the master of nominations this week. She decided on Friday to nominate Juliette, Sabrina and Zelko.

^Note 20: In week thirteen, Marie solves the secret of the House and wins a place in the final but she gives this place to Aurélie after a dilemma.

=== Nominations: Results ===
Weeks	Nominated	Evicted
Day 1	Anthony (75%), Elizabeth (25%)	Elizabeth
Week 1	Ayem (33%), Zelko (30.5%), Daniel (26.5%), Anthony (10%),	Anthony
Week 2	Ayem (45%), Juliette (42%), Julie (13%)	Marie-Josée (Walked), Julie
Week 3	Zarko (46.2%), Zelko (43.3%), Rudy (10.5%)	Rudy
Week 4	Geof (31.4%), Geoffrey (22%), Simon (19.4%), Zarko (15%), Morgan (12.2%)	Morgan
Week 5	Ayem (41%), Morgane (31%), Jonathan (28%)	Jonathan
Week 6	Zelko (59%), Zarko (41%)	Zarko
Week 7	Juliette (32.9%), Simon (30.3%), Ayem (18.7%), Daniel (18.1%)	Daniel
Week 8	Zelko (42.33%), Ayem (19.76%), Juliette (19.1%), Simon (18.9%)	Simon
Week 9	Zelko (83%), Ayem (17%)	Ayem
Week 10	Zelko (58.4%), Geof (41.6%)	Geof
Week 11	Zelko (63.9%), Juliette (19%), Sabrina (17,1%)	Sabrina
Week 12	Marie (87.6%), Juliette (12.4%)	Juliette
Week 13	Marie (57.5%), Geoffrey (18.5%), Zelko (14.6%), Morgane (9.4%)	Morgane
Final	Marie (45%), Zelko (43.1%), Aurélie (9.2%), Geoffrey (2.7%)	Geoffrey, Aurélie, Zelko

== Prime-Time Ratings ==
Like every year the first prime-time is at 08.45pm.

Show N°	Day & Hour	Viewers	Ratings Share
1	Friday, July 8 8:45 p.m-11:30 p.m	4 241 000	22,4%
2	Friday, July 15 10:30 p.m - 12.15a.m	2 600 000	20,3%
3	Friday, July 22 10:30 p.m - 12.15a.m	2 500 000	20%
4	Friday, July 29 10:30 p.m - 12.15a.m	2 581 000	23,1%
5	Friday, August 5 10:30 p.m - 12.15a.m	2 920 000	27,2%
6	Friday, August 12 10:30 p.m - 12.15a.m	2 390 000	23%
7	Friday, August 19 10:30 p.m - 12.15a.m	2 400 000	19,6%
8	Friday, August 26 10:30 p.m - 12.15a.m	2 600 000	24%
9	Friday, September 2 11:00 p.m - 01.00a.m	2 700 000	29%
10	Friday, September 9 11:00 p.m - 01.00a.m	3 000 000	29,2%
11	Friday, September 16 11:00 p.m - 01.00a.m	2 900 000	23%
12	Friday, September 23 11:00 p.m - 01.00a.m	3 047 000	26,5%
13	Friday, September 30 11:00 p.m - 01.00a.m	2 848 000	24,7%
14	Friday, October 7 11:00 p.m - 01.00a.m	2 300 000	23,5%
15 [Finale]	Friday, October 14 10:40 p.m - 12.50a.m	3 200 000	26%
