= Nikola Mijailović (baritone) =

Serbian baritone (born 1973)

Nikola Mijailović (born 1973) is a Serbian baritone who has a prolific international opera and concert career since the mid-1990s. He is particularly admired for his portrayals in the operas of Giuseppe Verdi. He sang on several complete opera recordings on a variety of music labels. Mijailović is artistic director of the Opera in National Theatre in Belgrade and a head of Singing department at the Faculty of Music in Belgrade.

Born in Belgrade, Mijailović began his voice studies with his mother Radmila Smiljanić, a voice teacher on the faculty at the University of Arts in Belgrade. After earning degrees from the University of Music and Performing Arts Vienna (1993) and the Curtis Institute of Music in Philadelphia (1996), Mijailović entered the Center de Formation Lyrique at the Opéra Bastille in Paris. While a student, he won several important international singing competitions, including first prize at the Mario Lanza (1994), Luciano Pavarotti (1995), and Leyla Gencer (1997) Voice Competitions. In the years 1995 and 1996 he had attended the summer conservatory program of the Music Academy of the West. He made his professional opera debut in Moscow at the Bolshoi Theatre as Schaunard in La bohème. That same year he sang the role of Marcello in La bohème at the Opera Company of Philadelphia opposite Pavarotti as Rodolfo.

Mijailović's career quickly took off, and by 2000 he had already sung leading parts at La Scala, La Fenice, the Kirov Opera, the Festival della Valle d'Itria, the Festival de Ópera de Las Palmas, the Festival de Radio France et Montpellier, the Festival Settimane Musicali di Stresa, the Prolirica in Lima, and the National Theatre in Belgrade among others. He has continued to sing roles at major opera houses internationally, in such parts as Alphonse XI in La favorite, the Count di Luna in Il trovatore, Don Carlo di Vargas in La forza del destino, Erensto in Il pirata, Escamillo in Carmen, Ford in Falstaff, Germont in La traviata, Leandro in The Love for Three Oranges, Orest in Elektra, Rodrigue in Don Carlos, and the title roles in Eugene Onegin and Macbeth among others.
