= OBN (TV channel) =

- Country: Bosnia and Herzegovina
- Broadcast area: Worldwide via Satellite
- Network: Broadcast Television Network

Ownership
- Owner: Ivan Ćaleta

History
- Launched: 23 July 1996

Links
- Website: www.obn.ba

OBN (Open Broadcast Network) is a local television network broadcasting a TV channel in Bosnia and Herzegovina. The station is headquartered in the Pofalići neighborhood in Sarajevo.

OBN was founded in 1996 as the Open Broadcast Network by the Office of the High Representative and the European Union. It was oriented towards general news, and the international owners invested the equivalent of $20 million to contribute to OBN's development as a neutral television channel.

The station came under private ownership in 2000, when it was acquired by Ivan Ćaleta, a Croatian entrepreneur and former owner of Nova TV. Later, AMC Networks International bought an 85% stake in the television. Ćaleta bought the share back from AMC Networks in November 2019, making him the sole owner of the channel once again.

== Programmes ==
=== Telenovelas / Series since October 2019 ===
Original name	Bosnian translation	Origin
Elif	Elif	Turkey
Yaralı Kuşlar	Ranjene ptice	Turkey
Cennet'in Gözyaşları	Dženet	Turkey
Dila Hanım	Dila	Turkey
Öyle Bir Geçer Zaman Ki	Ali	Turkey
Kuzey Güney	Dolina suza	Turkey
Kınalı Kar	Nazar	Turkey
Bütün Çocuklarım	Sva moja djeca	Turkey
Nemoj da zvocaš	Nemoj da zvocaš	Serbia
Shakti - Astitva Ke Ehsaas Ki	Sestre	India

== Branding ==
Ever since the start of the channel in 1996, there have been four different logos used for OBN. The first logo of the channel was used from 1996 to 1999, the second logo from 1999 to 2005, the third logo from 2005 to 2008, and the current logo from 2008 onwards.
