= Dragan Marinković =

Bosnian actor and TV host (born 1968)

- Born: 17 March 1968 (age 58); Sarajevo, SR Bosnia and Herzegovina, SFR Yugoslavia
- Education: Academy of Performing Arts in Sarajevo
- Occupations: Actor, television personality
- Years active: 1994–present
- Height: 1.85 m (6 ft 1 in)
- Spouses: Amra Redžić (m. 2002; div. 2007); Tijana Golubović (m. 2009; div. 2015); Jovana Milić (m. 2016)
- Children: 2

Dragan Marinković "Maca" (born 17 March 1968) is a Bosnian actor and TV personality. Widely known by his nickname Maca, Marinković is most notable for his outrageous personality showcased during his stints on reality television. In mid-2007, he was a contestant on the first season of Veliki brat VIP (the Serbian version of Celebrity Big Brother), making it all the way to the final day. In early 2010, he repeated the same on another reality contest Farma.

Marinković's biggest acting job was a role opposite Mirsad Tuka and Mira Furlan in the 2010 multiple award-winning Bosnian film The Abandoned.

== Career ==
=== Acting ===
Born in Sarajevo in 1968, Maca graduated from the Academy of Performing Arts in Sarajevo. He experienced trouble breaking into the business following his graduation. Initially only involved with acting through supporting parts on film and in theater, he could be seen in the occasional play on small Sarajevo stages such as Kamerni teatar 55. Later Maca got small parts in various international film productions depicting the Bosnian War where he played stock character portrayals of local "bad guys" - usually cartoonish Serbian soldiers and paramilitaries. Two most notable such gigs were his appearances in Hollywood productions Welcome to Sarajevo and Behind Enemy Lines.

However, more substantial parts in local productions eluded him and he eventually turned to TV presenting as his main career activity. After getting some prominence as a television personality in Sarajevo and the rest of Bosnia, he often complained in interviews about various acting clans as the reason for his lack of headway in the local cinematography.

After getting some prominence outside of Bosnia in 2007 as a result of Veliki brat VIP appearance, he also started getting more acting gigs such as the 7-episode engagement on Serbian TV series Agencija za SiS on TV Pink.

=== TV presenting ===
With his acting career stuck in a rut in the mid-2000s, Maca simultaneously started appearing on television hoping to gain more exposure. He became one of the many rotating hosts on the morning programme called Balkan.Net, simulcast live on three TV Pink stations throughout the Balkans. His off-the-cuff nature quickly made him stand out among the various hosts. Around the same time he was involved in Pile and Maca Show on Pink BH, which he co-hosted with Zoran "Pile" Radojković.

That exposure led to Maca getting a show of his own in October 2005 - the aptly named One Man Show - Niko kao ja on OBN television in Bosnia. Conceptualized as a free format with street bits and in-studio pieces such as wrestling with strippers in chocolate and turbo-folk performances, the show often bordered on vulgarity with profanity, sexual innuendo, and street lingo being the norm. Following the controversy that erupted after the episode that aired on New Year's Day 2006, the show was taken off the air.

From January 2007, Maca was back on TV in a remake of Ruski rulet quiz (aired in Serbia from September 2003 until July 2005 hosted by Irfan Mensur) for Bosnian market, airing on Pink BH.

Arguably, Maca's biggest break on television came in May 2007 when he was included among the contestants on the first season of Veliki brat VIP (Celebrity Big Brother). Being seen by a wide television audience outside of Bosnia for the first time, his wild personality and attitude were impossible to ignore as he became the most talked about housemate. Profanity-laced tirades directed at fellow housemates and compulsive scratching were just some of his behavioural quirks that marked his time on the show in which he ended up making it in the final two, only to be beaten by retired football player Saša Ćurčić.

With his public profile raised in Serbia as a result of the show, Maca started getting jobs there as well.

In early September 2008, Maca was announced as part of the hosting crew on another Emotion project - Operacija trijumf reality show that started in late September 2008. In addition to co-hosting the gala evenings alongside Milan Kalinić, Nikolina Pišek, and Ana Mihajlovski each Monday, he also co-hosted a live broadcast called Najgori od sve dece on Saturday nights with Marijana Mićić.

In February 2009 he entered the Veliki brat house again, this time on the Veliki Brat VIP All Stars edition. Staying true to his reputation and imposing personality, he had ego clashes with everyone from rapper Gru, over to Miki Đuričić, and finally even Milić Vukašinović. Maca also frequently groped and harassed model and former Miss Yugoslavia Tijana Stajšić who surprisingly seemed receptive to his aggressive sexual advances.

In early July 2009, Maca started shooting episodes for the Balkan version of the Distraction game show, hosted by him, and set to air in the fall 2009 in five countries (Serbia, Croatia, Bosnia, Macedonia, and Montenegro).

=== Like Wife, Like Life - Theatre Play ===
"Like wife, like life" In 2019, Dragan Marinković premiered his monodrama "Like wife, like life," which quickly captured the hearts of the audience. This was followed by a major tour in Serbia, Bosnia and Herzegovina, Croatia, Macedonia, Montenegro, Canada, Germany, Sweden, Switzerland, Austria and other countries in the region and Europe. The success of Maca's play is evidenced by the award for "exceptional acting performances, masterful play, and stage presence" at the Balkan Independent Theater Scene Festival - PROVOKACIJA in Skopje in 2021.

=== Awards and Recognitions ===
Although often controversial, Dragan Marinkovic is a successful actor and television personality. He is a recipient of the Chamber Theatre 55 award for best acting achievement in the 1999/2000 season, and his performances have become hits, filling theaters throughout the region.

The success of the play "Like Wife Like Life" is also evident through the recognition it received. It was awarded for "exceptional acting performances, masterful play, and stage presence" at the Balkan Independent Theater Scene Festival - PROVOKACIJA in Skopje in 2021.

=== Personal life ===
Born in Sarajevo, Marinković currently resides in Novi Sad with his family.

In late September 2009 Maca opened a burek parlour (buregdžinica) called Burek.ba in Miloša Pocerca Street in Belgrade.

== Filmography ==
=== Film ===
Year	Title	Role	Notes
1997	Territorio Comanche	Soldado bosnio 2	
1997	Savršeni krug		
1997	Welcome to Sarajevo	Chetnik Leader	
1999	Jours tranquilles à Sarajevo	Dragan	
1999	Heroes		
2001	Soldati di pace	Merkham Ukaij	TV movie
2001	Behind Enemy Lines	Damir	
2003	Racconto di guerra		Short
2004	Kod amidže Idriza	Muhamed	
2007	Agencija za SiS	Belkanto	7 episodes
2010	The Abandoned	Šento	
2011	Neprijatelj	Lik	
2014	Politics and Other Crimes	Adnan	
2014	The November Man	Denisov	
2014	Reket	Bakir	
2014	„Politika i drugi zločini“		
2016	„Lažni svedok“		
2016	„Naknadno“		
2016	„Ubice mog oca“		
2017	„Psi laju, vetar nosi“	Slađan	
2018	„Ne diraj mi mamu“	Dževad Bukva	
2019	„Lud, zbunjen, normalan“	Bećir	
2021	„Kidanje“		

=== Television ===
Year	Title	Role	Notes
2006–2007	Tata i zetovi	Cicko	
2007	Agencija za SIS	Belkanto	
2008	Viza za budućnost		
2010–present	Lud, zbunjen, normalan	Bećir	
2013–2014	Kriza	Jose	
2017–2019	Psi laju, vetar nosi	Slađan	
2018	Ne diraj mi mamu	Dževad Bukva	
2022	Na rubu pameti	Fikret Pašić "Pipa"	
