= Ana Mihajlovski =

Serbian television presenter and actress

- Born: Ana Mihajlovski; 20 October 1982 (age 43); Belgrade, SR Serbia, SFR Yugoslavia
- Years active: 2003–present
- Partner: Goran Stamenković (2004–2008)

Ana Mihajlovski (Serbian Cyrillic: Ана Михајловски; born 20 October 1982) is a Serbian television presenter mostly hosting locally licensed reality programmes through Emotion Production. She also occasionally works as an actress.

== Career ==
Mihajlovski first appeared on television in 2001 while she was still in high school. She appeared on a talk/pop-culture programme called Loudspeaker on YU Info channel.

Her career breakthrough occurred on a show called Leteći start (Flying start ), created and produced by Emotion that started airing on RTV Pink in early February 2003. Just 20 years of age at the time, she co-hosted with Milan Kalinić and the two quickly became a very popular team.

Mihajlovski soon started appearing on other Emotion reality productions like 48 sati svadba that began airing in mid June 2004. The newfound popularity led to more jobs like hosting the 2004 Sunčane Skale music festival alongside Kalinić in Herceg Novi in July 2004. In late November 2004, Mihajlovski started appearing on Jednostavan život, another Emotion production, which was the Serbian version of The Simple Life where she and Marijana Mićić played bratty city girls trying to survive in rural surroundings. Airing on RTS, Serbian public broadcaster, the show gained decent popularity and after the first season ended sometime during spring 2005, more episodes were ordered. The second season started airing in early 2006, ending in mid-May.

Other than Jednostavan život, Mihajlovski did not work a lot throughout 2005 and 2006, because of finishing her university studies and getting pregnant.

She returned to television from maternity leave in May 2007 to host the inaugural season of Serbian Celebrity Big Brother called Veliki brat VIP.

From late September 2008 until early January 2009, she was part of the team hosting Operacija trijumf gala evenings each Monday. Local version of Star Academy that included contestants from five Balkan countries, simultaneously aired on 6 networks throughout the region and expanded her presence outside of Serbia, Montenegro and Bosnia-Herzegovina, where she was already well known. Additionally, during the show, she got dragged into a minor controversy when freshly voted-out contestant Jasmina Midžić in a fit of anger accused Mihajlovski of supposedly being part of the conspiracy to have contestant Danijel Pavlović (Midižić's direct opponent for elimination that night) remain on the show.

In February and March 2009, Mihajlovski hosted studio pieces for the Veliki brat VIP All Stars.She was the main television show presenter who aired on TV PRVA called Ana and Rakonjac. In 2014, she was working as a presenter at the regional version of the television music show X Factor.

== Private life ==
In late 2004, she started dating the entrepreneur Goran Stamenković, majority owner of Emotion Production, who was also her boss at the time. In May 2006, they announced their engagement and her pregnancy which was in the fifth month. Their child, daughter Iva, was born in October 2006; however, the couple never ended up getting formally married.

In July 2008, they ended their relationship as she reportedly moved out with their daughter though remained working for his company.

== Filmography ==
=== TV host ===
- Leteći start (2003–2004)
- 48 sati svadba (2005)
- Srodne duše (2005)
- Veliki brat (2007, 2008, 2013)
- Operacija trijumf (2008)
- Ana & Rakonjac Večernja TV dostava (2012)
- X Factor Adria (2014)
- Ja imam talenat! (2016-2017)
- Pokreni se (2022)

=== Actress ===
- Jednostavan život (Serbian version of The Simple Life) (2004–2006; 2012) as herself
