= Marijana Mićić =

Serbian TV host, and occasional actress (born 1983)

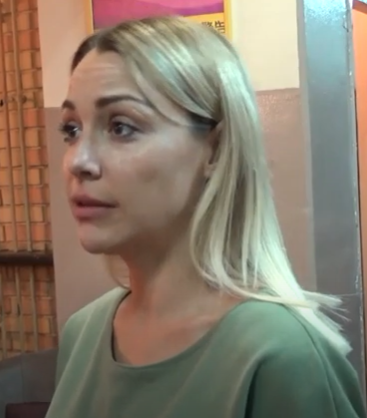
- Mićić in 2019
- Born: 20 March 1983 (age 43); Belgrade, SR Serbia, SFR Yugoslavia
- Occupations: Actress, television presenter
- Years active: 2004–present

Marijana Mićić (Serbian Cyrillic: Маријана Мићић; born 20 March 1983) is a Serbian TV host, and occasional actress, best known as the host of Veliki Brat, the Serbian version of Big Brother. She has hosted a number of shows, most of them for the Serbian production company Emotion. She also took part in the Serbian remake of The Simple Life, alongside Ana Mihajlovski.

Sometimes other TV hosts address her by her nickname Mara. During 2008, while hosting Najgori od sve dece, she and her co-host, Maca, came up with a sentence which later became their catchphrase: "Najav'la!".

== Appearances ==
As an actress:

- 2004 Te quiero, Radiša (I love you, Radiša), TV movie
- 2007 Ljubav i mržnja (Love and hate), TV series

As a contestant:

- 2004–2006 Jednostavan život (The Simple Life), reality TV series

As a host:

- 2003 Bunga Banga Re, children's interactive television
- 2004 Superheroj sa Ostrva Snova (Superhero from Dream Island), children interactive television
- 2005 Hoćeš, nećeš?!, TV show, similar to MTV's I Bet You Will
- 2006 Leteći start, TV show
- since 2006 Veliki Brat (Big Brother)
- 2008 Najgori od sve dece (The Worst of All the Children), variety show; an Operacija trijumf spin off
- 2012 Dnevni Magazin, TV show
- 2014 Pinkove zvezdice, Talent show
