= Stoja =

Serbian folk singer (born 1972)

Stoja Стоја
- Stoja in 2013, on the front cover of her studio album Nije da nije

Background information
- Born: Stojanka Novaković; 4 June 1972 (age 54); Perlez, SR Serbia, Yugoslavia
- Genres: Folk; pop-folk; turbo-folk
- Years active: 1997–present
- Labels: Lazarević Produktion; GETEX; Grand Production; BN Music; IDJ; Balkan Star
- Spouse: Igor Jovanović (m. 2009; div. 2014)

Stoja Novaković (Note: Stoja has changed her birth name Stojanka in previous nickname and stage name Stoja in 2008.) (Serbian Cyrillic: Стоја Новаковић; born 4 June 1972), known mononymously as Stoja, is a Serbian hardcore-folk singer. Recognised as one of the most popular turbo-folk performers, Stoja is noted for her strong deep voice and often eccentric appearances.

She released her first album, Kako je meni sada, in Lazarević Production in 1998. Later, she released her albums in the record label Grand Production. Within a short time, Stoja became one of the most popular singers in the Balkans. She is currently signed to BN Music, and has recently released songs with IDJ and Balkan Star too.

== Early life ==
Novaković was born on 4 June 1972 in the village of Perlez, in the Zrenjanin, Vojvodina municipality in northern Serbia. Her father Milan was born in Pukiš, a village in the Lopare municipality in northeastern Bosnia and Herzegovina, and her mother Katica was from Vojvodina. Stoja has a younger brother Živko. She was raised in Perlez, where she lived until the age of 25. When describing her childhood, Stoja said: "We had a hard life, we were poor. I was an energetic girl and caused problems for my parents. I was drawn to do everything I shouldn't.". According to Stoja, her father had a nice voice and he often sang sevdalinke, and she often listened to him. As a young girl she liked Marina Perazić, Bajaga i instruktori, Bijelo Dugme and Madonna.

She is said to have received her uncommon and strong voice from her father, Milan, but her talent was discovered by her teacher Sida. Sida, who led the second class, suggested that Stoja should go to a singing competition that was organized for students from the first to fourth grade, as well as to be the first voice of the choir. The competition went well, she won first place, and lived up to teacher Sida's expectations. Her father was not supportive of her singing career and they didn't speak for years because she decided to pursue that career path. It was only after her mother intervened that they reconciled.

After finishing elementary school, she enrolled in a commercial high school in Zrenjanin. On third school year, she decided to get married at the age of 16.

== Career ==
=== Beginnings (1987–1997) ===
Novaković began singing as an amateur in kafanas and discothèques in 1987. According to her, she started singing accidentally. She went to the local neighbourhood Slava where she sang for the first time. She quotes from that night: "Tips were flying in all directions, everyone was on tables and chairs. When we finished, the head of the orchestra told me not to go anywhere until we split the tip because I deserved it. My purse was full of money, I couldn't close it.". The band she sang with, came to her house and propose the idea to her of singing again with them. After her husband died in a car accident, she had to move out of his parents house where she was living with their son, and moved to her friends house. She continued singing, and eventually moved to Novi Sad, then Borča near Belgrade. One night she was noticed by composer Stevan Simeunović, upon which they started collaborating.

In 1997, she began recording an album for the record label Lazarević Production. Kako je meni sada (How Do I Feel Now), her debut studio album, was released in 1998, with songs like: "Da, da, da" (Yes, Yes, Yes) and a duet with Serbian folk singer Mile Kitić on the song "Takva je ljubav" (Such Is Love). That first album became a big success. Later that year, she signed with the label Grand Production, owned by Lepa Brena and Saša Popović, and released her second album, Ćiki, ćiki in 1999. The album featured multiple hit songs, the biggest being "Ćiki, ćiki". The title song "Ćiki, ćiki" and the track "Neću da ostarim" (I'm Not Going to Get Old) gained the greatest popularity. Television appearances followed, which she admits she was not fond of, but interest in her was growing. Despite the stormy year on the political and social front, Stoja performed throughout Serbia and Bosnia and Herzegovina.

=== Success (2000–2006) ===
She released her second studio album in 2000 under the name Samo (Only). It contained eight new songs and four bonus versions from the previous album. The title song "Samo" delighted the listeners and experienced greater success than the previous hit. In the same year, Stoja was named folk singer of the year. In 2001, it won the Popularity Oscar award in the "best circulation of the year" category.

The album Evropa (Europe) was released in 2002, and the title song gained great popularity in Serbia and the diaspora. Concerts and performances in Germany, Austria, Switzerland and other European countries followed. In addition to the title song, the songs "Idi, nek' te sreća prati" (Go, Let the Luck Follow You), "Umri" (Die[!]) and others were also well listened to, and considering that she also included previous hits on that album, the listeners could recall the songs "Samo", "Neću da ostarim" (I Won't Grow Old) and others. The title song from that album, and one of Stoja's greatest hits, song "Evropa" (Europe), can be heard in episode 19 of Bosnian TV series Viza za budućnost; that is when many people in Bosnia and Herzegovina started to listen Stoja, and since then she has been notably popular in this country; Stoja herself uploaded the mentioned insert from the series on her official YouTube channel.

She released her next, fifth studio album in 2003 under the name Zakletva (Oath). And then she treated the audience with eight new songs, among which "Živeo" (Live long), "Da zavolim ludo" (To Fall Madly in Love), "Samo idi" (Just Go) and others stood out. After that, there was a new turn in her career. She decided to completely change her appearance, lost more than twenty kilograms, dyed herself blue and released the ballad "Starija" (Older), which represented something completely different from the songs she had previously sung. The album of the same name was released on the market in 2004, and besides the title track, "Dijamanti" (Diamonds), "Da isečeš vene" (To Cut Your Veins) and others were also heard. "Starija" was declared folk album of the year.

Stoja released the EP Osveta (Revenge) with two songs in 2006 with the band Južni Vetar.

Two years later, in 2006 she released her seventh studio album under the title Metak (Bullet). There were eight new songs on it, including a duet with Šako Polumenta called "Gde god pođem tebi idem" (Wherever I Go, I Go Towards You), "Ne slušaj vesti" (Don't Listen to The News) and one of her most acclaimed songs in her career "Nešto mi govori" (Something Is Telling to Me). The audio of that song has 67.7 million views on her YouTube channel as of June 2026. Both the title song and the duet song were well received by the audience. That year, Stoja was declared the best folk singer in BiH, and her song "Metak" won the "Belgrade Winner" award.

=== Acclaimed Success (2008–2015) ===
In 2008, she released her most acclaimed album Do gole kože (To The Bare Skin) by the Grand Production label. The title song and track "Kučka" (Bi**h) stood out from this album, for which Stoja released attractive videos. The ninth studio album appeared on the market already the following year under the title "Naj, naj" (denotes something the best). The most popular songs from that album are "Da li si za seks" (Are You For Sex), "Zamalo" (For a Bit), "Jača nego pre" (Stronger Than Before), "Naj, naj", "Potopiću ovaj splav" (I'll Sink This Raft) and her most famous song, a duet with Dejan Matić "Muzika" (Music), which has over 24 million views on Grand Productions YouTube channel as of June 2026.

The song "Revolucija" (Revolution) and its music video were both released in October 2010. The video caused some stir in the media because it featured Stoja bathing in a bathtub full of peppers.

Her tenth studio album entitled Nije da nije (It's Not That It's Not) was released on 6 May 2013 by the Bosnia-based label BN Music, marking the first time in 15 years that Stoja has released an album with a production company other than Grand Production.

Following the release of Nije da nije, Stoja began releasing non-album singles including "Bela ciganka", "Ola ola", "Takvog dečka hoću ja", "Lila lila", and "Ti brate imaš sve". Her song "Bela ciganka" (White Gypsy) which was published on her YouTube channel, became an international success with over 100 million views as of 2024, 2025 and 2026, making it one of the most viewed videos at the Balkans.

Album Bela ciganka was released in 2015; it includes old hits, as well as new such as "Kao ovde nigde nije" (It's Nowhere Like Here) — first song, displayed at cover. Two singles were released the next year: "Ponovo" (Again) and "Ko preživi neka priča" (Let Talk A One Who Survives). BN Music published her single "Lila, lila" in February 2015. Stoja hired a proven good team of collaborators for this song as well, so success was not lacking. The track has so far been viewed more than 20 million times on YouTube as of June 2026. In October of the same year, she presented the single "Kao ovde nigde nije", which became one of the most requested songs at performances abroad. Tours all over Europe followed, and she organized a big concert for her listeners in Sofia, Bulgaria, which was attended by more than 18,000 people.

=== Now (2015–present) ===
In the following period, singles with music videos are released by Stoja, one of them being "Bomba" (Bomb) in 2017. In April 2017, with young singers Relja Popović and Coby, they released the song "Samo jako" (Just Go Hard) which samples her song from 2000 "Samo" from her album Samo. In one show, she admitted that this type of music was not close to her, but she decided to support her dear colleagues. The collaboration was immediate success, and the song gained 77 million views on YouTube. In May 2018, Coby and Stoja released the duet "Čista hemija" (Pure Chemistry), that's lyrics were written by Petar Lugonja and Vukašin Jasnić, and music and arrangement by Veljković. The song divided Stoja's fans into those who like her and those who think she should return to the music she did a few years ago. After that, YouTube music videos follow: "Ne treba mi život" (I Do Not Need A Life) in 2017, "Čista hemija" (music video in which she is dressed like Gaddafi; ft Coby) in 2018, "Ko bi rekao" (Who Would Say; ft Kija Kockar) in 2018, "Idi mami pa se žali" (Go to Your Mom And Then Regret) in 2019, "Žena sa Balkana" (A Woman from The Balkans; ft Mimi Mercedez) in 2019, "Svet se vrti oko nas" (World Is Spinning Around Us; ft Mimi Mercedez) in 2019, "Taki taki" in 2019, "Neka pati" (Let Him Suffer; ft Milan) in 2019 and "Aj, chiki, chiki" (ft Ludi Srbi) in 2019. Geto Gerila made a remix of her song "Džek" (Naj, naj album, 2009) entitled "Ostani tu" and published on 27 October 2019. The last release in 2019 was Geto Gerila remix of Stoja's hit "Ćiki, ćiki" (same-named album, 1999) entitled "Aj, chiki, chiki" and published on 20 December. Stoja had announced release of song "Lice" which was not published then because of 2019–20 coronavirus pandemic; the song was published in June 2020. In June 2021 she released song "Hera" with Balkan Star label.

Stoja released "Da li ona zna" (Does She Know) on her YouTube channel in June 2023.

Her latest (as of June 2026) release is a song "Animal", that is a duet with Gazda Paja; it was published in December 2025.

Stoja has been working with her long-time friend and lyricist Stevan Simeunović who is author of almost all her songs since her career has started.

== Personal life ==
=== Relationships ===
Novaković was first married at age 16, became a mother at 17 and was widowed at 19 when her first husband lost his life in a 1991 car crash, ending their three-year marriage. When talking about her husband, she said: "I knew my first husband from the village. He was from a rich farming family and much older than me. One day he came to my father to propose me. Dad told him that it will be as I decide. I was 16 years old and I got married literally right out of school. After a few months, I became pregnant and it was a real shock for my parents. It wasn't a problem for me. I went to school pregnant and graduated. My first husband was attentive to me and I had a carefree life. He looked after our son and me and did not allow anything to disturb us. Whenever I wanted to do something, he would tell me that there was no need because he had enough money for everything.". The period after his death was financially difficult for her. She was quoted as saying: "I was very poor. I did not have anything to eat.". She became a grandmother at age 33 when her son Milan's first child was born.

Since 2007, she has lived in Belgrade, more specifically the Bežanijska kosa neighborhood in New Belgrade. Novaković married architect Igor Jovanović on 1 November 2009, after being in a relationship for five years. Their relationship has been on-again-off-again, with the couple constantly breaking up and getting back together. In a March 2014 interview, Novaković revealed that she once attempted suicide by driving her car into a wall to keep their marriage from dissipating.

=== Family ===
On 4 October 2011, Stoja found her mother Katica, who had heart problems and diabetes, dead in bed after being suspicious when Katica did not emerge from her bedroom that morning.

Stoja survived a car accident on 28 May 2012 when her car was totaled after being hit by a truck. She escaped with a minor injury to the forehead.

Stoja has said that her favorite singer is Šemsa Suljaković and she has frequently covered Suljaković's songs at concerts and television appearances, and was even interviewed with her in June 2012.

=== Cosmetic surgeries ===
Stoja is known for numerous cosmetic procedures and exceptional figure, which has accompanied her since the beginning of her career. Stoja is one of the first people from Serbia's showbusiness world to admit that she went to Turkey for cosmetic surgery and that it cost a lot (the figure of over 100,000€ is also mentioned). The surgeries were mostly corrective and aimed at getting a more beautiful figure, because Stoja has been struggling with "extra pounds" since the beginning of her career. "I know that! When I change, I change everything! This summer I promised to lose weight and do something new. I tried and it worked, I'm really happy. I spent 10 days and two months recovering in Turkey. It still hurts, I was immobile for 3–4 days", she said and added: "I was in an artificial coma for nine and a half hours. I would not like to talk about the figure, but it is somewhere around 100,000€. When you say Turkey, everyone knows that it is not very cheap and easy, but I am very satisfied", concluded Stoja for Pink.rs. After these corrections, Stoja specially secured one part of her body: "I secured my butt like J.Lo. It's not exactly a million like her, because we live in Serbia, but in accordance with our financial possibilities", the folk singer pointed out.

== Discography ==
Studio albums

- Kako je meni sada (1998)
- Ćiki, ćiki (1999)
- Samo (2000)
- Evropa (2001)
- Zakletva (2003)
- Starija (2004)
- Metak (2006)

1. "Ne slušaj vesti"
2. "Nešto mi govori"
3. "Gde god pođem tebi idem"
4. "Neću proći jeftino"
5. "Metak"
6. "Sve sam živo pokvarila"
7. "Leti, leti"
8. "Ako smeta tvojoj sreći"

- Do gole kože (2008)

1. "Baš, baš"
2. "Do gole kože"
3. "Idi"
4. "Kučka"
5. "Može viski"
6. "Pogrešna"
7. "Potopiću ovaj splav"
8. "Stena"
9. "Muzika"

- Naj, naj (2009)
- Nije da nije (2013)
- Bela ciganka (2015)

1. "Kao ovde nigde nije"
2. "Bela ciganka"
3. "Lila lila"
4. "Takvog dečka hoću ja"
5. "Ola, ola"
6. "Robija"
7. "Nije da nije"
8. "Hoću pesmu, hoću lom"
9. "Zgazi, ubi"
10. "Kakva sam takva sam"
11. "Pare, pare"

Music videos

Title	Year	Directed by
Starija	2004	Dejan Milićević
Metak	2006	Dejan Milićević
Ja te Mićo ne volim	2008	
Do gole kože	2008	
Kučka	2008	
Pogrešna	2009	Dejan Milićević
Da li si za seks	2009	
Kakva sam, takva sam	2010	
Živi i uživaj	2010	
Revolucija	2010	Goran Šljivić
Pare, pare	2012	
Ti brate imaš sve	2015	Darko Stanković
Bomba	2017	Goran Šljivić
Samo jako	2017	Andrej Ilić, Ljubomir Stefanović Ljubba
Ne treba mi život	2018	
Čista hemija	2018	Leonard Firstner
Ko bi rekao	2018	
Idi mami pa se žali	2019	Džimi Džu
Žena sa Balkana	2019	Džimi Džu
Svet se vrti oko nas	2019	
Taki taki	2019	
Neka pati	2019	Ljuba Radojević
Ostani tu	2019	
Aj, chiki, chiki	2019	
Lice	2020	
Hera	2021	Marko Panić
Jovo nanovo	2022	Vladimir Miladinović
Milioner	2023	
Da li ona zna	2023	Jasmin Toni Lehman
Institucija	2025	
Animal	2025	Ognjen Opačić, Pavle Bošković

Compilations

- Viki, Dara, Seka & Stoja — 4 dame (2004)
- Stoja & Sejo Kalač (2005)
- The Best of Stoja (2007)
- Kao ovde nigde nije! / Bela ciganka (2015)

Live

- Stoja (1999)
- Armeec live (2016)

Other

- Što me tražiš sada (1998)
- Šemsa & Stoja (2000)
- Zašto sam ti verovao (2003)
- Meni se ne spava (2007)
- Ponovo (2016)
- Ko preživi neka priča (2016)
