= Diskos (record label) =

Yugoslav state-owned record label managed by Refik Skudrinja

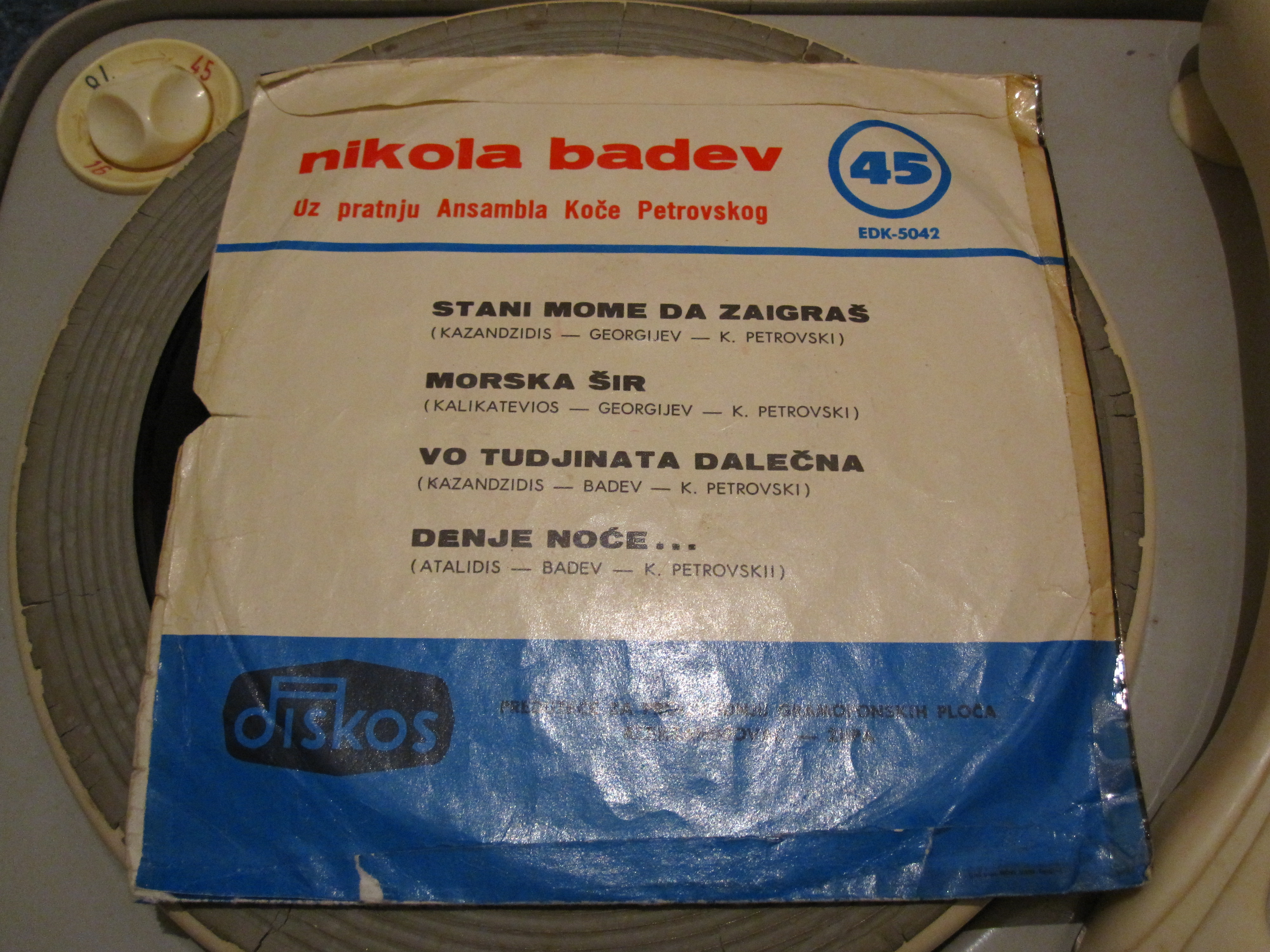
- A back cover of a 7-inch single released by Diskos
- Founded: 1962
- Genre: Various
- Country of origin: SFR Yugoslavia
- Location: Aleksandrovac

Diskos was a Yugoslav state-owned record label, founded in 1962 and based in Aleksandrovac, SR Serbia.

Initially, Diskos published pop and rock music, publishing records by some of the pioneers of the Yugoslav rock scene, like Iskre, Kameleoni, Siluete, Tomi Sovilj i Njegove Siluete, Sanjalice and Novi Fosili, and later moved mostly towards folk music.

== Artists ==
Some of the artists that had been signed to Diskos include:

- Jašar Ahmedovski
- Apartman 69
- Silvana Armenulić
- Aska
- Nedeljko Bajić Baja
- Šaban Bajramović
- Ana Bekuta
- Zorica Brunclik
- Crni Biseri
- Dah
- Zekerijah Đezić
- Iskre
- Južni Vetar
- Kameleoni
- Jelena Karleuša
- Mile Kitić
- Šerif Konjević
- Lepa Lukić
- Maja Marijana
- Kemal Malovčić
- Zlatko Manojlović
- Srđan Marjanović
- Vera Matović
- Seid Memić Vajta
- Mitar Mirić
- Dragana Mirković
- Jasmin Muharemović
- Dušan Nikolić
- Lola Novaković
- Novi fosili
- Opus
- Himzo Polovina
- Šako Polumenta
- Džej Ramadanovski
- Nino Rešić
- Sinan Sakić
- Sanjalice
- Beba Selimović
- Siluete
- Tomi Sovilj i Njegove Siluete
- Perica Stojančić
- Mira Stupica
- Šemsa Suljaković
- Suncokret
- Mira Škorić
- Teška Industrija
- Novica Urošević
- Vatreni Poljubac
- Milić Vukašinović
- Zebra
- Zlatni Prsti
- Toma Zdravković

During its initial years, Diskos also published comedy records by actors Mija Aleksić and Miodrag Petrović Čkalja, records of Italian pop singers, like Adriano Celentano, Tony Dallara and Gino Volpe, for the Yugoslav market, as well as several records of spiritual music.

Like other former Yugoslav labels, Diskos was also licensed to release foreign titles for the Yugoslav market which included certain albums by: America, Louis Armstrong, The Band, Count Basie, Jeff Beck, Pat Benatar, Chuck Berry, Blondie, The Byrds, Chicago, Miles Davis, Fats Domino, The Doors, Bob Dylan, Duke Ellington, Ella Fitzgerald, Roberta Flack, Aretha Franklin, Jethro Tull, Carole King, Kiss, Kris Kristofferson, Led Zeppelin, Little Feat, Madness, The Manhattan Transfer, Matchbox, Men Without Hats, Liza Minnelli, Osibisa, Ram Jam, Redbone, Santana, Boz Scaggs, Sherbet, Simon & Garfunkel, Spandau Ballet, Bruce Springsteen, Rod Stewart, Barbra Streisand, James Taylor, Van Halen, Weather Report, Wild Cherry, Teddy Wilson, Yazoo and Yes.

== Competition ==
Other major labels in the former Socialist Federal Republic of Yugoslavia were: PGP-RTB and Jugodisk from Belgrade, Jugoton and Suzy from Zagreb, Diskoton from Sarajevo, ZKP RTLJ from Ljubljana, and others.

== See also ==
- List of record labels
