= Kemal Malovčić =

Bosnian folk singer (born 1946)

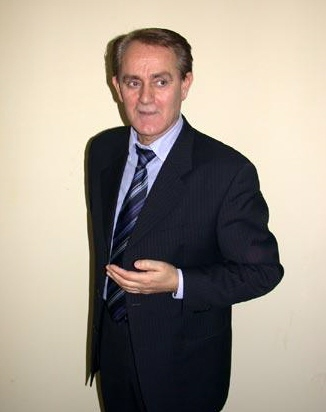

Background information
- Born: Kemal Malovčić; 6 May 1946 (age 80); Sanski Most, PR Bosnia and Herzegovina, FPR Yugoslavia
- Genres: Folk, Pop-folk
- Occupation: Musician
- Years active: 1960s–present
- Formerly of: Južni Vetar

Kemal Malovčić (born 6 May 1946) is a Bosnian folk singer. He started his career in the 1960s.

== Career ==
During the 1980s, Malovčić was a member of Južni Vetar, being among the "Big 5" singers of the band, together with Sinan Sakić, Dragana Mirković, Šemsa Suljaković and Mile Kitić. His singles were released on Diskos label, including his first single "Nevernice moja / Sana" (1970), which won him a "golden vinyl" award. As of 2019, Malovčić has released 25 albums and 16 singles and EPs According to some information, he has sold over 10 million records worldwide. His first album with Južni Vetar, Okreće se kolo sreće, sold in over 600,000 units.

== Personal life ==
Malovčić's daughter Edita, known by her stage name Madita, is also a singer and actress.

== Discography ==
He released the following albums:

- Gdje si sada, leptirice moja (1982, with Ansambl Branimira Đokića)
- Doviđenja, ja nemam strpljenja (1983, with Ansambl Branimira Đokića)
- Škorpion sam ja (1984, with Ansambl Branimira Đokića)
- Okreće se kolo sreće (1985, with Južni Vetar)
- Ko gubi... (1986, with Južni Vetar)
- Oženi me babo moj (1987, with Južni Vetar)
- Kemal (1988, with Južni Vetar)
- Prosjak ljubavi (1989, with Južni Vetar)
- Caru ide carevo (1990, with Južni Vetar)
- Ti si moj 13. broj (1991, with Južni Vetar)
- Kemal (1993, with Džavid Band)
- Neka paša, neka aga (1994, with Džavid Band)
- Trn u oku (1995)
- Neka pjesma krene (1997)
- Eh, da sam, da sam, da sam (1997, with Džavid and Fahro Band)
- Kolo sreće se okreće (1999, with Džavid Band)
- Kemal Malovčić (1999, with Fahro and Favoritti Band)
- Ranjeno je srce moje (2001, with Džavid Band)
- Car ljubavi (2002)
- Tek, tek (2004)
- Sretan put (2006)
- Sikter (2007)
- Deveram (2009)
- Dame imaju prednost (2011)
- Kralj pjesme (2016)
