= Hanka Paldum =

Bosnian singer and record label owner (born 1956)

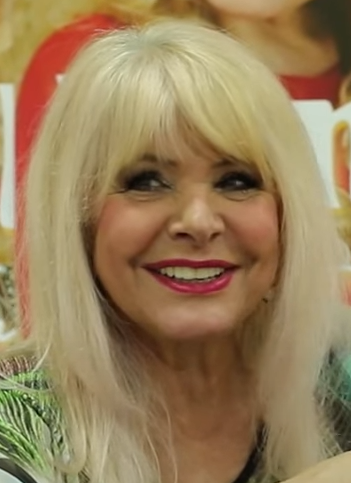
- Paldum in 2022
- Born: 28 April 1956 (age 70); Čajniče, PR Bosnia and Herzegovina, Yugoslavia
- Occupation: Singer
- Years active: 1972–present
- Musical career
- Origin: Sarajevo
- Genres: Folk; Sevdalinka
- Labels: Nimfa Sound (record & music label publisher); Diskos; Sarajevo Disk; ZKP RTVL; Jugodisk; Gold Music; Croatia Records

Hanka Paldum (born 28 April 1956) is a Bosnian sevdalinka singer and co-founder of the record label Sarajevo Disk. She is regarded as one of the best female sevdah performers of the 20th century and is popular in her home country of Bosnia as well as in the rest of the former Yugoslavia.

== Biography ==
=== 1956–71: Early life and family ===
Hanka Paldum was born in the eastern Bosnian town of Čajniče to Muslim Bosniak parents Mujo and Pemba. Paldum had three brothers Avdo, Mustafa and Smail (died 2007) and two sisters, Raza and Rasema. Her father was a logger and her mother wove carpets to provide additional financial assistance for the family, as her fathers salary was not enough to carry a family of seven. Hanka, the oldest female child, began helping her mother with housework at the age of five. When Paldum was seven years of age, her parents moved the family from Čajniče to the Vratnik neighbourhood within the Sarajevo municipality of Stari Grad.

Paldum started singing in the first grade, as part of the choir in her primary school. She would continue singing throughout her childhood and recalled in an interview: "We went by train to my aunt's home, my mother's sister in Rudo. There were a lot of tunnels and when the train entered a tunnel, I would sing, and when it come out of the tunnel I stopped, because I was shy. The other passengers would ask who was singing that beautifully, and I just looked out the window as if it did not apply to me. But inside, my heart was leaping with joy."

At the age of twelve, Hanka's brother Mustafa, a member of the Bratstvo (Brotherhood) cultural association, encouraged her to sneak out through her bedroom window and sing at the association events, promising to "cover" for her. She would sing for 15 to 20 minutes and run back home. The director of the House of Culture named Marijan Ravlić, asked her parents to allow her to sing at some local events. Her father allowed it, but with only with the presence of her older brother, Mustafa, who was no less strict than their father. Then Hanka began to sing in amateur contests, which she often won, with the award being chocolate with rice or ten tickets for the cinema. She shared the chocolates, while tickets for the theater remained unused because of her father's strictness.

After three years of struggle, Hanka proved to her parents her passion for music and said she wanted to enroll in a music school. Her father told her she must enroll in a school that would lead to a secure career with which she could find a job that would earn her money. Around that time, Hanka's father, Mujo became gravely ill and soon died of his illness. Her younger brother Mustafa died in 2007 of lung cancer at the age of 49.

=== 1972–78: Radio Sarajevo, first recordings, and marriage ===
Paldum passed an audition at Radio Sarajevo and began voice lessons. After two years of hard work, she made her first archival recordings for Radio Sarajevo. They were sevdalinka songs, a traditional Bosniak genre of folk music. Her first recording was her version of an old sevdalinka song called "Moj behare" (My Blossom). She continued recording and recorded over a hundred sevdalinkas for radio archives.

Paldum recorded and released her first extended play (EP) in 1973, at the age of seventeen, when producer and composer Mijat Božović offered her his partnership in recording two singles "Ljubav žene" (The Love of a Woman) and "Burmu ću tvoju nositi" (I Will Wear Your Wedding Ring) alongside the big folk orchestra Radio-TV Sarajevo. She recorded five more EP's in two years before releasing her debut studio album, I Loved Unfaithful Eyes on 13 February 1974

Also in 1975, Hanka won top prize at the festival of amateur singers called "Pjevamo danu mladosti" (Sing for the Youth Day), with the song "Pokraj puta rodila jabuka" (On the Roadside, a Tree Bore an Apple), written by Mijat Božović. Her prize was a chance to produce a single for the record label Sarajevo Diskoton. This song was not a big hit at the time, but with time it gained moderate success. She continued her partnership with Mijat Božović, who believed in her talent and that she would become a big folk star. He wrote a song for her called "Voljela sam oči zelene" (I Loved Green Eyes) which in a few months became a big hit; for a long time the song was Hanka's signature song, and is still a hit among people of the former Yugoslavia. There is also a version in Slovenian.

After success with "Voljela sam oči zelene" she performed as a debutante at the Ilidža Festival with the song "Ja te pjesmom zovem" (I Call You with My Song). The song was disqualified because one of the judges at the time, Milan Radić, who was a reporter, thought that the song was not worthy enough to enter the competitive part of the program. However, after the songwriter Julio Marić insisted the song be placed in the competition, Hanka went on to compete. This song became a big hit and has been covered by multiple other artists.

Hanka met her first husband Muradif Brkić, a student of literature at the University of Sarajevo, while she was in high school. After three or four months of friendship, they began dating. They married soon after he graduated from the university in the late 1970s. Shortly thereafter, he went to the mandatory service in the Yugoslav People's Army, and Hanka started her first big Yugoslavian tour with Meho Puzić.

She and her first husband had two children: a daughter Minela and a son named Mirzad. She was pronounced clinically dead when giving birth to their son, but survived.

Hanka started singing in Sarajevo alongside Omer Pobrić, a gifted and popular accordion player, and by doing so gained vocal and performing experience.

=== 1979–82: Voljela sam, voljela, Čežnja, and Sanjam ===
In 1979, her husband finished his service with the army. Then, with Hanka and Braco Đirlo, founded a record company called "Sarajevo Disk". They signed a rock band called "Vatreni Poljubac" (Burning Kiss) with Milić Vukašinović in the forefront of the band. After hearing Milić's song "Volio sam volio" (I Loved, I Loved), Muradif recommended that Hanka record that song. At first Hanka was hesitant and even Milić wasn't too thrilled about the idea: "I was a bit skeptical at first, but when I heard how Hanka sang that song; when I felt the power and temperament of her voice, I knew we were going to take over Yugoslavia", Milić said. She recorded her version in a 'home studio' owned by innovative producer and ethno-pop composer Nikola Borota – Radovan. Their meeting was instrumental to her career and climb to the stardom. Hanka's interpretation of the song, "Voljela sam, voljela" (I Loved, I Loved), in 1978, sold over a million copies. Hanka became recognized across the country of Yugoslavia and was offered to sing in guest spots and hold her own concerts. She also won many awards and much recognition, including the "Oscar of Popularity", three "Golden Stars", as well as being named the female artist of the year.

The following year, in 1979, after significant success with that single, she recorded another single "Odreću se I srebra I zlata" (I Will Give Up Silver and Gold). At the same time she was preparing a full-length studio album, called Srebro i zlato (Silver and Gold), named after the song.

Along with Milić Vukašinović as the main songwriter, other recognized names from the world of Yugoslav folk, pop and rock music were present: Goran Bregović, Nikola Borota – Radovan, Bodo Kovačević, Mijat Božović, Blagoje Kosanin. Under Nikola Borota's direction, for the first time in Yugoslavian folk music history, electronic music instruments and pop music arrangements were used, songs had different rhythm section treatment than ever before and as a result Hanka's interpretations were different and original.

With the song "Voljela sam, voljela" and the album Čežnja (1980), she merged folk and rock music. Her work was not received well by music critics, composers and colleagues. They said her music undermined traditional folk music. However, Čežnja was overwhelmingly accepted by the public, broke many industry records, and sold over a million copies, and the songs in new folk-rock manner attracted listeners who had never before listened to her or folk music.

With non-traditional business approach Hanka started attracting the media as well as the public: as the singer promoted the album Čežnja on Opatija festival of music, she also promoted it in Belgrade and had her first solo concert in Dom Sindikata, again musically produced by Nikola Borota – Radovan. Lazar Ristovski was on synthesizers, Džemo Novaković on lead guitar, Sanin Karić was playing bass, two double drum kits were deployed while Ljubiša Pavković and Mico Radovanović were only two traditional instrumentalists present on stage, sharing the lead accordion roles. A tour of Yugoslavia followed, and almost every song from the album became a hit, in particular the songs "Crne kose" (Black Hair), "Zbog tebe" (Because of You), "Čežnja" (Yearning) and "Zbogom" (Farewell).

In 1982, she released the album Sanjam (I’m Dreaming) with Milić Vukašinović as the main songwriter. With this album Milić created his life's work, while Hanka went from a popular singer to a big Yugoslav star. Taking into consideration that her own label "Sarajevo Disk" did not have its own record plant, the album, because of overwhelming demand, was manufactured and distributed by four different companies.

=== 1983–91: Južni Vetar, touring, and acting ===
Hanka started her tour, and for the first time in folk music, held concerts in big sporting arenas across Yugoslavia. In Belgrade's "Dom sindikata" where, in seven days, she held a record-breaking 14 sold-out solo concerts. Similar to her previous studio album, almost every song on the album became a hit, especially the title song "Sanjam" and "Ja te volim" (It's You I Love). Likewise "Ljubav je radost i bol" (Love is Joy and Pain) and "Voljeni moj" (My Beloved). She received a Yugoslavian star award, four Oscars for popularity in a row, a few female artist of the year awards, a gold plaque for humanist award, and won the following festivals: "Ilidža," "Vogošća," "MESAM," and "Poselu" from 202 Radio Belgrade program.

Hanka has performed at the arenas "Lisinski," in Zagreb, Croatia, "Sava Center," in Belgrade, Serbia, and "Zetra," in Sarajevo, the capital of her home country Bosnia and Herzegovina. She held many humanitarian concerts. She represented Yugoslavia in International Festival in Berlin. At this time production companies were competing for the rights for Hanka's new material. Hanka with help from her husband Muradif chose Belgrade's "Jugodisk." It was said that the bonus she received from Jugodisk is the highest in history of Yugoslavia. In 1983, she released the album Dobro došli prijatelji (Welcome Friends) again teaming up with songwriter Milić Vukašinović.

The next album, Tebi ljubavi (For You, My Love) was released in 1984, which was a tremendous success. The songs were written by Mišo Marković. The biggest hit off the album was the ballad "Ali pamtim još" (But I Still Remember).

In 1985, with composer Miodrag Ilić and ensemble Južni Vetar (Southern Wind) she recorded the album Nema kajanja (No Regrets). With this album she dominated the popular oriental folk genre, and made it one of the most successful albums of the year.

Once again, she went back to the studio with Milić Vukašinović in 1986 and recorded the album Bolno srce (Aching Heart), which brought many hits including a win at the festival of folk music "Vogošća" with the title song "Bolno srce." On this album she also recorded a sevdalinka called "Sjećaš li se djevo bajna" (Do You Remember the Stellar Maiden) with accordion player, Milorad Todorović.

She had a cameo in the Benjamin Filipović film Praznik u Sarajevu (Holiday in Sarajevo, 1991) in a scene with Emir Hadžihafizbegović.

Paldum married for the second time to a man named Fuad Hamzić. It also ended in divorce. She later called the marriage a "mistake".

=== 1992–95: Break up of Yugoslavia ===
When Yugoslavia broke up and went into war, Paldum spent the entirety of the war in Bosnia and Herzegovina in Sarajevo between 1992 and 1995.

=== 1996–2008: Nek’ je od srca and Žena kao žena ===
Paldum collaborated with Hari Varešanović, lead singer of the band Hari Mata Hari, on her 1999 album Nek’ je od srca (Let It Be From the Heart.) They recorded the hit song "Crni snijeg" (Black Snow) together. The ballad "Svaka rijeka moru stići će" (Every River Will Reach the Sea) was called the 'best song of the year' by radio stations.

In November 2004, she held a major concert in the Zetra Arena, marking three decades of her career. Guests included Halid Bešlić, Alka Vuica, Josipa Lisac, Esma Redžepova, Saša Matić and Milić Vukašinović.

She continued to release hit songs later in her career, such as "Žena kao žena" (A Woman Like a Woman), "Što da ne" (Why Not), "Sarajevo" and "Dođi" (Come Here) in 2006, released on the studio album Žena kao žena under the label Hayat Production. The ballad "Mojoj majci" (To My Mother) was the biggest hit off the album.

=== 2008–14: Sevdah je ljubav and Što svaka žena sanja ===
On 7 November 2012, during a humanitarian concert in Zenica, Paldum and Serbian singer Dragana Mirković first publicly sang their duet "Kad nas vide zagrljene" (When They See Us Embrace.) The song officially premiered one year later on 26 November 2013, when the music video was released. The video shows Paldum in Sarajevo singing about Bosnia and Mirković in Belgrade singing about Serbia. Near the end of the video they meet on Stari Most in Mostar, embrace, and dance. Their video was featured prominently in Bosnian and Serbian media.

=== Later career ===
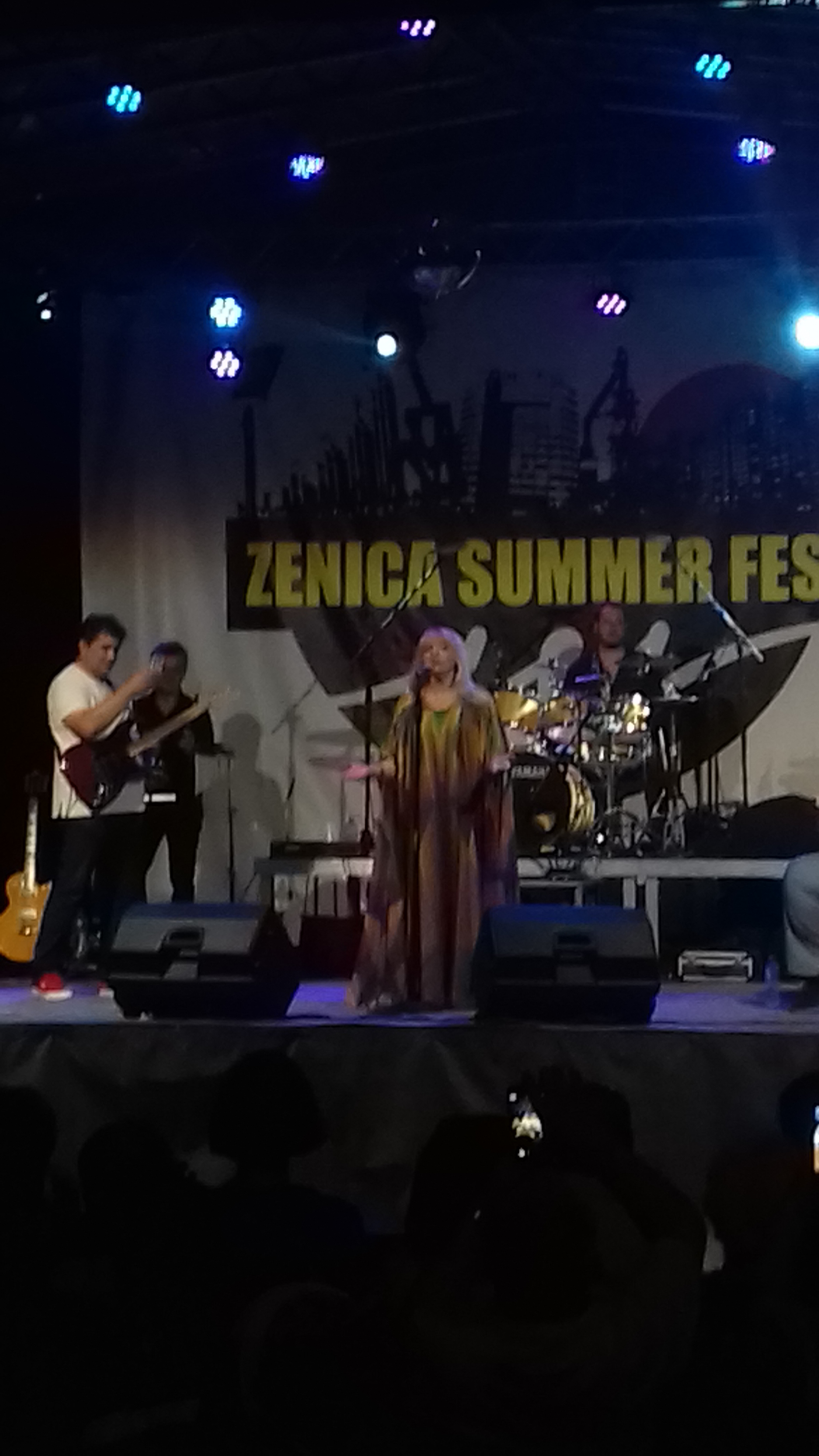
During 16th night of Zenica summer fest 2019

Paldum took part in the 16th-night show (on 7 August) of Zenica summer fest 2019 by giving 2-hour soloist performance on Zenica city square.

== Personal life ==
=== Marriages and children ===
Paldum's first marriage was to Muradif Brkić (nicknamed Mufta), director of the record label Sarajevo Disk. Their 1976 wedding took place in his hometown Duvno. Paldum had two children with Brkić: a daughter and a son. Paldum's ex-husband Muradif Brkić died 26 May 2024 of a stroke, aged 76.

=== Torture allegations ===
In January 2013, Goran Golub, a Serb former captive in the Silos concentration camp accused Paldum of torturing him on 10 February 1993 during the Bosnian War. Golub said that while he was a prisoner in the camp, Paldum and fellow Bosnian singer Dino Merlin were to perform for the soldiers of the Army of the Republic of Bosnia and Herzegovina on Igman mountain, where Silos was located. On that day, Golub alleges to have seen Paldum walking around the camp wearing an army outfit, when she saw him looking at her, he claims she approached him and yelled "What are you looking at?" When he didn't reply, he then claims Paldum asked him, "Do you wanna fuck me? Is that it?" When he didn't reply again, he alleges that Paldum ordered him to sit down and spread his legs, then he claims that she stepped on his genitals with all her strength. Golub further claims that that sexual torture is why he never married and that he thinks of the torture every time he urinates. Paldum denied the allegations and further stated that she had never even been in Silos during the war. She did state that the first time she left the city of Sarajevo during the siege and war was on 6 September 1993, not long after the Sarajevo Tunnel opened. She went to the Igman mountain with several singers, one of which was Dino Merlin, to perform for the Bosnian soldiers. When asked if she had seen or had any contact with Serb prisoners during the war, she said "No! Never, never!" After the concert, she and the other singers were brought back to the city of Sarajevo with a helicopter.

The allegations created a whirlwind of media attention in the former Yugoslav countries. Serbian singer Jelena Karleuša offered her support to Paldum during a television appearance on Pink BH.

Paldum filed a lawsuit against Golub's lawyer Duško Tomić in March 2013 for false accusations of war crimes and torture. That same month she was quoted as saying: "As for me, I cannot wait for an investigation to be launched into the allegations that the media highlighted and I wish to clear this stain off my name and prove that I am innocent. I cannot wait for all this to be over."

== Discography ==
- Voljela sam oči nevjerne (1974)
- Srebro i zlato (1979)
- Sjajna zvijezdo (1980)
- Čežnja (1980)
- Sanjam (1982)
- Dobro došli prijatelji (1983)
- Tebi ljubavi (1984)
- Nema kajanja (1985)
- Bolno srce (1986)
- Gdje si dušo (1988)
- Kani suzo izdajice / Tako me uzbuđuješ (1989)
- Vjetrovi tuge (1990)
- Nek’ je od srca (1999)
- Džanum (2001)
- S' kim si – takav si (2003)
- Žena kao žena (2004)
- Što svaka žena sanja (2013)

== Filmography ==
=== Film ===
- Praznik u Sarajevu (Holiday in Sarajevo, 1991)

=== Television ===
- Në orët e vona (At Late Hours, 1982)
- Nad lipom 35 (Under the Linden, 2006)
- Lud, zbunjen, normalan (Crazy, Confused, Normal, 2009–12); 2 episodes
