= Sinan Sakić =

Serbian pop-folk singer (1956–2018)

- Синан Сакић
- Born: 13 October 1956; Loznica, PR Serbia, Yugoslavia
- Died: 1 June 2018 (aged 61); Belgrade, Serbia
- Resting place: Loznica, Serbia
- Occupation: Singer
- Years active: 1978–2018
- Spouse(s): Velida Milkić (m. 1974 or 1975; div. 1977) Sabina Sakić (m. 1981)
- Children: 6 (4 biological; 2 step)
- Musical career
- Genres: Folk, Turbo-folk, Pop-folk
- Instruments: Vocals, drums
- Labels: Diskos (record label); Grand Production; PGP-RTB; Vujin Records; Renome; Gold Audio Video; Starčević Production; Južni Vetar; City Records; Mascom Records; VIP Productions

Sinan Sakić (Serbian Cyrillic: Синан Сакић; 13 October 1956 – 1 June 2018) was a Serbian pop-folk singer.

Sakić first reached massive popularity as a member of the Yugoslav turbo-folk band, Južni Vetar (Southern Wind). He also went on to have a successful career as a solo artist. Sakić was one of the most successful artists in the ex-Yugoslavia region.

== Early life ==
Sinan Sakić was born in Loznica, PR Serbia, FPR Yugoslavia on 13 October 1956. His mother, Đulka, worked at a factory, and his father, Rašid, was a member of the military orchestra.

== Career ==
When Sakić was only 13 years old, he was a drummer for a folk band. Later on, he played with the bassist Bratislav Braca Dinkić. He was a drummer until 1984.

In the late 1970s, by profession, Sakić was a welder; however, he also worked as a waiter in a kafana. Sakić did not believe in his own singing abilities. If it had not been for a customer who offered him 500 Dinars to hear him sing, Sakić likely would not have pursued a musical career. From then on, Sakić decided to perform folk music and to learn popular folk songs. Sakić aimed to learn 5 songs a day. In his repertoire, he included songs by popular artists such as Toma Zdravković, Šaban Šaulić and Zdravko Čolić.

Sakić launched his singing career in 1978 with the singles, Sreli Smo Se Mnogo Kasno and Jedna Tuga Za Dva Druga.

Sakić gained popularity in the 1980s, as a vocalist in the Yugoslavian musical act, Južni Vetar; alongside Dragana Mirković, Mile Kitić, Šemsa Suljaković and Kemal Malovčić. He was a member from 1982 until 1991. He left due to the hospitalisation of Miodrag Mile Ilić (Mile Bas), the bassist and founder of Južni Vetar. While Ilić was hospitalised, Sakić recorded two albums under the production of Zoran Starčević; Ljubila Me Žena Ta (1992) and Korak Do Sna (1993). Once Ilić had recovered, Sakić rejoined Južni Vetar and recorded another 7 albums; U Meni Potraži Spas (1994), Ruža i Trn (1995), Zoko, Moja Zoko (1996), Dodirni Me (1997), Drž' Se Mile Još Si Živ (1998) and Ne, Ne Daj Da Te Ljubi (2001).

After 17 albums with Miodrag M. Ilić, Perica Zdravković, Sava Bojić and Branislav Vasić, Sakić once again left Južni Vetar.

Sakić's career began to stagnate in the 2010s due to alcohol problems which caused his health to deteriorate. In 2014, Sakić performed his signature songs, Lepa Do Bola and Ej, Od Kad Sam Se Rodio on Zvezde Granda. Due to his increasingly poor health, his last album, Jedina, was released that same year.

== Personal life ==
At the age of 18, after serving his mandatory stint in the Yugoslav People's Army in Pula, SR Croatia, Sakić married his first wife, Velida Milkić. Together, they had two sons, Rašid and Medo. The former was to serve 12 years in prison for armed robbery and murder charges before dying in prison and the latter is a singer. Sinan and Velida later divorced. He and his second wife, Sabina (born 1959), were married on 29 June 1981. Sabina already had two sons, Ernest and Elvis, from her previous marriage. Together, they had a daughter, Đulka, and a son, Alen; a rapper who frequently collaborates with Stefan Đurić Rasta.

Sakić visited the guru Sathya Sai Baba in India every year from 1996 until Baba's death in 2011.

== Death ==
Sakić had been advised to undergo a liver transplant as a lasting solution to his liver problems. He was placed on a waiting list for the organ. After suffering a heart attack, his health deteriorated dramatically.

While the organ was being obtained, Sakić left the hospital and decided to stay at home until the surgery; which was to be conducted in Padua, Italy. He died on 1 June 2018. He was given an Islamic funeral service on 4 June 2018 in Loznica, Serbia.

== Discography ==
- Mala Šemsa (compilation of singles from 1978 to 1981)
- Miko, druže moj (1982)
- Što me pitaš kako živim (1983)
- Pogledaj me (1984)
- Reci sve želje (1985)
- Pusti me da živim (1986)
- Svi grešimo (1987)
- Čaša po čaša (1988)
- Reci čašo (1989)
- Kad se vrate skitnice (1990)
- Na Balkanu (1991)
- Ljubila me ta žena (1992)
- Korak od sna (1993)
- U meni potraži spas (1994)
- Ruža i trn (1995)
- Zoko, moja Zoko (1996)
- Dodirni me (1997)
- Drž’ se Mile još si živ (1998)
- Ne, ne daj da te ljubi (2000)
- Nisi više zaljubljena (2001)
- ...Na eks (2002)
- Emotivac (2005)
- To je život moj (2009)
- Šalu na stranu (2011)
- Jedina (2014)
- To si ti (2022)
