= Kako je meni sada =

Studio album by Stoja
- Released: 1998
- Genre: Folk, pop, pop folk, turbo folk
- Label: Lazarević Produktion

Stoja chronology
Kako je meni sada (1998)	Ćiki, ćiki (1999)

Kako je meni sada (English: What It's Like For Me Now) is the first studio album by Bosnian Serb singer Stoja. It was released in 1998.

== Track listing ==
1. Da, da, da (Yes, Yes, Yes)
2. Takva je ljubav (That's How Love Is, featuring Mile Kitić and Stojan Popov)
3. Nek' te vetar nosi (Let the Wind Take You)
4. Ne volim te više (I Do Not Love You Anymore)
5. Da li ti je duša srećna (Is Your Soul Happy)
6. Sad mi život nije važan (Now Life is Not Important to Me)
7. Kako ću bez tebe (How Will I Live Without You)
8. Tako je to (That's How It Is)
9. Kako je meni sada (What It's Like For Me Now)
