= Luče moje =

Studio album by Dragana Mirković
- Released: February 28, 2006
- Genres: Folk, pop
- Label: PGP RTS

Dragana Mirković chronology
Trag u vremenu (2004)	Luče moje (2006)	Eksplozija (2008)

Luče moje is the eighteenth studio album by Serbian singer Dragana Mirković. It was released in 2006.

== Background ==
In February 2006, Radio Television Serbia (RTS) started showing a commercial which had the album in promotion. It was released on sale on 28 February and the album's title "Luče moje" gathered attention from the audience as Mirković was called "Luče from Kasidole" at the beginning of her career. In contrast to her previous albums, Luče moje did not feature a single folk song, all of them were in a modern rhythm. Among the 12 songs included, one was a Serbian-language cover of a Russian song which is called "Teci mi Kroz Vene" (English: Run Through My Veins). The promotion was imagined through a mini show but this was later cut into several music videos for all of the album's singles. All backing vocals were sung by the popular pop singer Ceca Slavković.

== Singles ==
"Pečat na Usnama" was released as a single from the album. The music for the song was written by Aleksander Kobac and Marko J. Kon, the lyrics were written by Vesna Petković while the arrangement was finalized by Aleksander Kobac. The music video for the song directed by Dejan Miličević, features her lying on the floor dressed in a striped dressed and backed by numerous lying dancers. To further promote the song, Mirković performed it at her own DM Sat.

Three other singles were released from the album including "Na kraju", "Sudbina" and the title song "Luče moje" all released alongside music videos. Despite the four singles, two other songs from the album, the opening song "Ako me ostaviš" and "Depresivan dan" were also highlighted.

== Track listing ==
1. Ako me ostaviš (If you leave me)
2. Pečat na usnama (Stamp on you lips)
3. Na kraju (At the end)
4. Sudbina (Destiny)
5. Luče moje (My sweetheart)
6. Luda kao ja (Crazy like me)
7. Ljubi il' ubi (Kiss or kill)
8. Danak ljubavi (Tribute of love)
9. Hoću sve (I want everything)
10. Teci mi kroz vene (Run through my veins)
11. Depresivan dan (Depressing day)
12. Nepoželjna (Undesirable)
