= Ola ola =

Single by Stoja
- Released: 14 May 2014
- Genre: Pop folk
- Length: 3:39
- Label: BN Music
- Songwriter: Stevan Simeunović
- Producer: Aleksandar Kobac

Stoja singles chronology
"Bela ciganka" (2013)	"Ola ola" (2014)	"Takvog dečka hoću ja" (2014)

"Ola ola" is a song recorded by Serbian pop-folk recording artist Stoja. It was released as a non-album single 14 May 2014. The song was written by Stoja's longtime songwriter Stevan Simeunović and produced by Aleksandar Kobac.

The song was premiered when Stoja performed it on Bravo Show on RTV Pink.
