= Nema kajanja =

Nema kajanja No Regrets

Studio album by Hanka Paldum and Južni Vetar
- Released: 1 January 1985
- Genre: folk, sevdalinka
- Label: Jugodisk

Hanka Paldum and Južni Vetar chronology
Tebi ljubavi (1984)	Nema kajanja No Regrets (1985)	Bolno srce (1986)

Nema kajanja (No Regrets) is the eighth studio album by Bosnian folk singer Hanka Paldum featuring the band Južni Vetar. It was released 1 January 1985 through the record label Jugodisk.

== Track listing ==
1. Nema kajanja
2. Srce je moje kamen
3. Kasno je za sve
4. Hoću da budem samo žena
5. Pa šta
6. Lutaj srce
7. Ne idi
8. Ne dirajte uspomene
9. Ne smijemo se rastaviti
