= Jana (singer) =

Serbian singer (born 1974)

Jana Јана
- Born: Dragana Stanojević; 15 March 1974 (age 52); Pristina, SR Serbia, Yugoslavia
- Genres: Turbo-folk, Pop folk
- Occupation: Singer
- Years active: 1988–present
- Labels: Grand Production (formerly ZaM/Zabava miliona), VIP Production (later renamed BN Music)
- Spouse: Ivan Todorović (m. 1995)

Dragana Todorović (née Stanojević; Serbian Cyrillic: Драгана Тодоровић née Станојевић; born 15 March 1974), known professionally as Jana (Serbian Cyrillic: Јана), is a Serbian turbo-folk and pop folk singer.

== Biography ==
=== Early life ===
Dragana Todorović was born 15 March 1974 in Pristina, SR Serbia, SFR Yugoslavia, and grew up in the village of Babin Most, near the town of Obilić.

Her career started in 1988 when, at the age of fourteen, she visited a well-known kafana in the town of Obilić with her parents and brother (who played the accordion). During dinner, she took the microphone and sang "Što me pitaš" by Šemsa Suljaković with her back to the audience, receiving roaring applause.

Jana graduated from the Stevan Mokranjac music school in Pristina in 1992. That same year, she released her first album, titled Imam moć, under the name Dragana Stanojević through Yugoslavia's state-owned record label, PGP-RTB. She continued performing in kafanas throughout Kosovo, then took a short break from singing due to the commercial disappointment of her last album. During this time, she worked as a music teacher at an elementary school in Babin Most.

=== Career ===
In 1997, she met singer Marina Živković in Kosovska Mitrovica, which launched her career. As Živković was preparing for her concert, she overheard Todorović singing and was left "breathless". She asked for Jana to come to her table and talk and after the conversation, she recommended Jana to friend, Ivan Todorović (Jana's future husband) who owned a discothèque and was in need of a live band. Not long after, Ivan traveled to Pristina to meet with Jana. That day, Jana and her cousin met up with him near the Grand Hotel and struck up a record deal.

In October 1997 she moved to Germany, four months prior to the outbreak of war in Kosovo. She became extremely homesick, but was unable to travel home because of the insecurity. She was signed to the now-defunct record label Zabava miliona (ZAM). Because there already was a famous singer called Dragana Mirković, Saša Popović, the label's director, recommended that she adopt Jana as her stage name. She released Sokolica in 1998.

She then recorded her third album, Prolaznica (1999), under the label Grand Production after having toured with its founder, Lepa Brena.

Jana's fourth studio album, Ostavi mi drugove (2000), featured the hit songs "Ko visoko leti", "Robinja", and the title track. It was followed by her fifth release, Prevara do prevare (2001), with the hit songs "Barabar" and "Tuge mi dovoljno".

For her seventh album, Zidovi (2003), she began working with VIP Production (later renamed BN Music), a label founded and owned by her husband Ivan Todorović. Hers was the first album distributed by VIP Production. Jana released three more albums under the label: Malo magije (2005), Kući, kući (2007) and Jana Dva (2011).

=== Personal life ===
Jana and Ivan Todorović married in 1995. On 2 November 2006, Jana gave birth to her daughter, Kristina Džulijen Todorović in Las Vegas, Nevada.

== Discography ==
=== Albums ===
- Imam moć (1992)
- Sokolica (1998)
- Prolaznica (1999)
- Ostavi mi drugove (2000)
- Prevara do prevare (2001)
- 5 (2002)
- Zidovi (2003)
- Malo magije (2005)
- Kući, kući (2007)
- Jana Dva (2011)

Sokolica (1998)

1. Crna ovca
2. Druge ljubiš srcem
3. Dva života
4. Gresi nebeski
5. Hiljadu puta
6. Kapitulacija
7. Moje drugo lice
8. Primadona
9. Sestre
10. Sokolica

Prolaznica (1999)

1. Prolaznica
2. Mostovi
3. Za tebe za mene
4. Željna
5. Piši propalo
6. Umirem ti majko
7. Ožiljak
8. Inostranstvo
9. Veselo društvo
10. Spremna na sve

Ostavi mi drugove (2000)

1. Ostavi mi drugove
2. Robinja
3. Ko visoko leti
4. Odvedi me srećo
5. Pesmu imam samo
6. Samica
7. Tamo gde me najviše boli
8. Patila sam ja
9. Neće moći tako
10. Oprosti ženo

Prevara do prevare (2001)

1. Prevera do prevare
2. Tuge mi dovoljno
3. Sviraj nešto narodno
4. Dođe mi da vrisnem (featuring Saša Matić)
5. Nazdravi sa mnom
6. Kuda
7. 'Ajde dođi, šta ćeš tu?
8. Lažu me lažu
9. Jasno je
10. Barabar

5 (2002)

1. Hajde Jano
2. Htela sam ti reći
3. Miraz
4. Pa nek sama večera
5. Piješ, ne nudiš
6. Rođena za kraljicu
7. Samo da znaš
8. Šta će ti pevačica
9. Suviše lepa
10. Vratiti se neću
11. Za badava

Zidovi (2003)

1. Koje li su boje njene oči?
2. Rame uz rame
3. I lomi i moli
4. Duh iz lampe
5. Svi dignu ruke
6. Zidovi
7. Kad slavuji zapevaju (featuring Šekib Mujanović)
8. Evo, ja ću
9. Srećna nova
10. Za mene se zna

Malo magije (2005)

1. Ne pitaj
2. Malo magije
3. Imam pravo
4. Crna kutija
5. Cena tuge
6. Sunce sjalo (featuring Sejo Kalač)
7. Troši me ove noći
8. Ja sam tvoja
9. Stari prevarant
10. Zabranili ženi piće

Kući, kući (2007)

1. Iza tvojih prozora
2. Idi pa se leči
3. Ja nisam ona
4. Beleg
5. Kući, kući
6. Prevari me
7. Ljubav nije greh
8. Kunem ti se
9. Tužni se smeju najlepše
10. Ja te samo ljubim

Jana Dva (2011)
New songs

1. Jana 2
2. Rane od pre
3. Kada se svetla pogase
4. Princeza
5. Višak prtljaga
6. Nije in da budeš fin
7. Jutro posle
8. Niko nije kriv
9. Gori kuća naša

Old songs as bonus tracks

1. Kući kući
2. Iza tvojih prozora
3. Beleg
4. Ne pitaj
5. Crna kutija
6. Stari prevarant
7. Cena tuge
8. Ljubav nije greh
9. Ja nisam ona

=== Non-album singles ===
- Lune, lune (2012)
- Zapevaj, zaigraj (2012)
- Bruka i sramota (2013)
- Anđele Moj (2013)
- Boginja (2014)
- Može, može (2014)
- Bravo, bravo (2015)
- Ostavljam (2015)
- Samo široko (2015)

=== As featured artist ===
- Jutro tuge (2009) with Asim Bajrić
- Ti i ja (2012) with MC Stojan
- Za sve dobre ribe (2012) with Marta Savić
- Aj, milo moje (2012) with Jasmin Jusić
- Muči me (2013) with DJ Sky
- Lude godine (2013) with DJ Đuro
- Sve bih dala (2015) with Đogani
- Lepoto moja (2015) with Big Time & DJ Mr.Dani-E
- Sipaj mi duplo (2016) with Deny
- Pevačica (2017) with MC Stojan
- Vesti (2018) with Mirko Plavšić
- Nemoguce (2019) with Hako Sljivar
- Treća princeza (2019) with Nadica Ademov
