= Bela ciganka =

Single by Stoja
- Released: 4 November 2013
- Genre: Pop folk
- Length: 3:06
- Label: BN Music
- Songwriter: Stevan Simeunović
- Producer: Aleksandar Kobac

Stoja singles chronology
"Zgazi, ubi" (2013)	"Bela ciganka" (2013)	"Ola ola" (2014)

"Bela ciganka" ("White Gypsy") is a song recorded by Serbian pop-folk recording artist Stoja. It was released as a non-album single 4 November 2013. The song was written by Stoja's longtime songwriter Stevan Simeunović and produced by Aleksandar Kobac.

A preview of the song was uploaded to her YouTube account on 2 November 2015, with the full song being released two days later and performed for the first time on the television show BN Koktel on BN Televizija.
