= Misurići =

Village in Maglaj, Bosnia and Herzegovina

- Village
- Location within Bosnia and Herzegovina
- Country: Bosnia and Herzegovina
- Entity: Federation of Bosnia and Herzegovina
- Canton: Zenica-Doboj
- Municipality: Maglaj

Area
  - Total: 2.35 sq mi (6.09 km^{2})

Population (2013)
  - Total: 1,556
  - Density: 662/sq mi (256/km^{2})
- Time zone: UTC+1 (CET)
  - Summer (DST): UTC+2 (CEST)

Misurići is a village in the municipality of Maglaj, Bosnia and Herzegovina.

Bosnian singer Šemsa Suljaković lived in the Misurići village for the first few years of her life.

== Demographics ==
According to the 2013 census, its population was 1,556.

Ethnicity in 2013
Ethnicity	Number	Percentage
Bosniaks	1,481	95.2%
Croats	11	0.7%
Serbs	17	1.1%
other/undeclared	47	3.0%
Total	1,556	100%
