= Čežnja =

Čežnja may refer to:

- Čežnja (song), a 1965 song by Vice Vukov
- Čežnja (album), a 1980 album by Hanka Paldum
