= Sanjam =

Sanjam I'm Dreaming

Studio album by Hanka Paldum
- Released: 22 April 1982
- Recorded: January 1982
- Studio: Studio 6 Radio (Belgrade)
- Genre: folk, sevdalinka
- Label: Sarajevo Disk
- Producer: Milić Vukašinović

Hanka Paldum chronology
Čežnja (1980)	Sanjam; I'm Dreaming (1982)	Dobro došli prijatelji (1983)

Sanjam (I'm Dreaming) is the fifth studio album by Bosnian folk singer Hanka Paldum. It was released 22 April 1982 through the record label Sarajevo Disk.

== Background ==
In 1982, Paldum recorded Sanjam (English: I'm Dreaming) with Milić Vukašinović as the songwriter. With this album, Vukašinović created his life's work, while Paldum went from a popular singer to a big Yugoslavian star. Taking into consideration that record label "Sarajevo Disk" did not have its own production, the album, because of overwhelming demand, was distributed and produced in four production companies. Hanka's success was unheard of in the Yugoslavian scene; she became the favorite in the eyes of public and respected by the music critics.

Paldum started her tour, and for the first time in folk music, held concerts in big sporting arenas across ex-Yugoslavia. In Belgrade’s Dom Sindikata in seven days she held a record breaking 14 sold-out solo concerts. She created euphoria among the people. Like the first album, almost every song on this album is a hit, especially the title song "Sanjam" and the mega hit "Ja te volim" (English: "It's You I Love"), likewise "Ljubav je radost i bol" (English: "Love is Joy and Pain"), and "Voljeni moj" (English: "My Love"). She received a Yugoslavian star award, four Oscars for popularity in a row, a few female artist of the year awards, a gold plaque for humanist award, and won the following festivals: "Ilidža", "Vogosca", "MESAM" and "Poselu" from 202 Radio Belgrade program.

== Track listing ==
- All songs written and arranged by Milić Vukašinović.
1. Sanjam
2. Ja te volim
3. Ljubav je radost i bol
4. Voljeni moj
5. Uzalud mi tražiš oproštaj
6. Nikad više
7. Da l’ ću više ikad ljubit’
8. Nikoga nemam, pomoć kad ti treba
