= Nije da nije =

Studio album by Stoja
- Released: 6 May 2013
- Recorded: 2010–13
- Genres: Folk, pop
- Label: BN Music

Stoja chronology
Naj, naj (2009)	Nije da nije (2013)

Singles from Nije da nije
- 1. "Kakva sam, takva sam" Released: 16 March 2010; 2. "Šuki, Šuki" Released: 17 January 2012; 3. "Sad' ja tebe neću" Released: 28 April 2012; 4. "Pare, pare" Released: 13 October 2012; 5. "Nije da nije" Released: 7 May 2013

Nije da nije (English: It's Not That It's Not) is the tenth studio album by Bosnian Serb singer Stoja. It was released on 6 May 2013.

Her previous album, Naj, naj (Best, Best), was released in July 2009. Starting in 2010, Stoja stated that she would release a couple singles yearly, rather than release a complete tenth album. Between March 2010 and October 2012, she released eight "non-album singles". Near the end of 2012, she announced plans to record a full tenth studio album. Upon its release in 2013, it featured 4 of the 8 non-album singles, as well as 4 newly recorded songs.

In total, she released nine complete studio albums between 1998 and 2009, making Nije da nije her jubilee tenth album.

Nije da nije was produced by the Bosnia-based record label BN Music, marking the first time in 15 years that Stoja has released an album with a record label other than Grand Production.

== Track listing ==
1. Robija (Hard Labor)
2. Nije da nije (It's Not That It's Not)
3. Hoću pesmu, hoću lom (I Want a Song, I Want a Rumpus)
4. Zgazi, ubi (Crush, Kill)
5. Šuki, Šuki
6. Pare, pare (Money, Money)
7. Sad' ja tebe neću (Now I Don't Want You)
8. Kakva sam, takva sam (I Am How I Am)

== Singles ==
Out of the eight non-album singles released between March 2010 and October 2012, four of them were featured on Nije da nije:

- Kakva sam, takva sam (I Am How I Am) was originally released on 16 March 2010
- Šuki (renamed Šuki, Šuki on the CD) was originally released on 17 January 2012
- Sad' ja tebe neću (Now I Don't Want You) was originally released on 28 April 2012
- Pare, pare (Money, Money) was originally released on 13 October 2012

These four non-album singles were not featured on Nije da nije:

- Živi i uživaj (Live and Enjoy), featuring vocals from Ivan Plavšić and Ivan Gavrilović, was originally released on 21 June 2010
- Revolucija (Revolution) was originally released in October 2010
- Polako (Slow) was originally released on 9 May 2011
- Idi gde ti volja (Go Where You Wish) was originally released on 9 May 2011

The first newly recorded song off Nije da nije to be released as a single was the title track:

- Nije da nije (It's Not That It's Not) was released as a single on 7 May 2013

== Music videos ==
The music videos for the song "Kakva sam, takva sam" (I Am How I Am) was released the first week of April 2010.

"Pare, pare" (Money, Money) was the fourth of the non-album singles and second song featured on the album to get a music video. The video was filmed in Svilajnac, Serbia on 1 October 2012 and released on 4 November 2012, 22 days after the song's debut.

== Production ==
Her friend and longtime songwriter Steva Simeunović wrote most of the songs with Aleksandar Kobac.
