= Dragana Todorović =

Dragana Todorović may refer to:

- Bebi Dol
- Jana (singer)
