= Cerani =

Cerani may refer to:

- Cerani, Derventa, village in the municipality of Derventa, Bosnia and Herzegovina
- Cerani (mountain), mountain in Peru

== See also ==
- Cerami, a comune in Sicily
