= Ćiki, ćiki =

Studio album by Stoja
- Released: February 21, 1999
- Genre: Folk, pop
- Label: Grand Production

Stoja chronology
Kako je meni sada (1998)	Ćiki, ćiki (1999)	Samo (2000)

Ćiki, ćiki is the second studio album by Bosnian Serb singer Stoja. It was released in 1999.

== Track listing ==
1. Ćiki, ćiki
2. Prevareni (Deceived People)
3. Ni kriva ni dužna (Not Guilty, Not Obliged)
4. Gori, gori stara ljubav (It Burns, It Burns, The Old Love)
5. Ne moli me (Don't Beg Me)
6. Sto godina (A Hundred Years)
7. Neću da ostarim (I Do Not Want to Grow Old, titled "Moje srce ostariti ne sme" (My Heart is Not Allowed to Age) and released as a bonus track on her third studio album, Samo)
8. Biću tvoja (I'll Be Yours, featuring Đani)
