= Tri života =

Studio album by Mile Kitić
- Released: 1999
- Genre: Pop-folk
- Label: Grand Production
- Producer: Perica Zdravković

Mile Kitić chronology
Do sreće daleko, do Boga visoko (1998)	Tri života (1999)	Zlato, srebro, dukati (2000)

Tri života (English translation: Three Lives) is the eighteenth studio album by Bosnian Serb singer Mile Kitić. It was his second album to be produced and released by the label Grand Production.

== Track listing ==
No.	Title	Lyrics	Length
1.	"Tri života"	Ljiljana Jevremović	3:11
2.	"Tako ti i treba"	D. Cvijović	3:17
3.	"Pije mi se"	Siniša Vuco	3:34
4.	"Helena"	Milanko Ćirković	3:31
5.	"Mala"	Ljiljana Jevremović	3:12
6.	"Bog ti srce dao nije"	D. Cvijović	3:22
7.	"Videli se nismo dugo"	Vera Milosavljević	3:44
8.	"Evo zore"	D. Cvijović	2:48
9.	"Dunavski splavovi"	Ljiljana Jevremović (lyrics), Rođa Raičević (music)	3:00
10.	"Ti nestajeś"	Milanko Ćirković	3:48
