= Nino Rešić =

Nino
- Born: Amir Rešić; 22 January 1964; Bosanska Dubica, SR Bosnia and Herzegovina, SFR Yugoslavia
- Died: 18 October 2007 (aged 43); Bijeljina, Bosnia and Herzegovina
- Resting place: Urije Cemetery, Kozarska Dubica
- Occupation: Singer
- Years active: 1990–2007
- Musical career
- Genres: Turbo-folk, pop folk, Narodna
- Labels: Elita, PGP-RTS, Diskos, Gold Music, City Records, Zabava miliona, VIP Production, Renome

Amir Rešić (22 January 1964 – 18 October 2007), known by the stage name Nino, was a Bosnian turbo-folk singer.

== Biography ==
Rešić was born 22 January 1964, in Bosanska Dubica, Bosnia and Herzegovina, to a Bosniak family. After completing high school and serving in the Yugoslav People's Army, Amir he moved to Kruševac, SR Serbia in the 1980s to pursue a singing career.

After moving to Kruševac in the 1980s, Amir met a Serbian woman who would become his first wife. Upon meeting his first wife, Rešić converted from Islam to Serbian Orthodoxy and changed his name to Nikola (which is where his nickname Nino comes from). Amir would go on to marry this woman, but would only remain in a relationship with her for a few years before filing for divorce.

Amir's conversion was a source of controversy, especially with the ethnic tensions brewing in Yugoslavia at the time, which would eventually lead into the Yugoslav Wars. Amir's friends claim that he never officially changed his religion, and some sources claim that Amir had only done so to help his turbo-folk career, which was overwhelmingly run by the Serbian entertainment scene. Amir would eventually convert back to Islam and relocate back to Bosnia and Herzegovina in 2004.

Rešić was married and divorced 3 times, with the marriages resulting in three daughters: Amela, Sandra and Tamara. His daughter Sandra Rešić competed in Zvezde Granda.

Amir lived the rest of his days in Bosnia and Herzegovina. In 2007, at the age of 43, he died from the perforation of the pancreas, caused by long-term excessive alcohol consumption.

== Career ==
Under the stage name Nino, Amir became a leading pop folk singer in ex-Yugoslavia with several hit songs released in the 1990s. Off of his 1993. album, Zbogom Mala, all of his songs were hits even getting a VHS music video album release. His first album, Žena Je Žena, came out in 1991. with publisher PGP-RTB and his second album, Što Mi Noći Nemaju Svanuća, was released in 1993. with his third album Zbogom Mala. His second album had 10 songs: "Što Mi Noći Nemaju Svanuća", "Moja Draga Prevari Me", "Samo Reci Da", "Oči Su Moje Mutne Od Dima", "Sudbina Zla", "Mangup", "Noć Ne Noćim", "Obriši Se Suzo Sama", "Pevaj Pevaj Srce Moje", "Dodelio Mi Život Tugu". Fourth album Šta Ću Mala S' tobom (1994. PGP-RTS) had 7 music videos: "Šta Ću Mala S' Tobom", "Udahni Duboko", "Sunce Nek Potamni", "Donesi Divlje Mirise", "Oči Bez Sjaja", "Bolje Da Te Nisam Ni Poljubio", "Zasviraće Sve Gitare"; all of them were smash hits and were circulating non-stop on Yugoslav Radio Television.

In 1995, Amir released 9 music videos: "Tvoje Oči", "Otrovana Grehom", "Nije Meni", "Idi Moram Da Ti Kažem", "Kasnije Il' Pre", "Pesma Prijatelju", "Ljubav Od Mastila", "Pesma Prijatelju", "Divlja Devojka" (the latter featuring Dragana Mirković as a duet).

== Discography ==
Studio albums:

- Car (1991; 35 years ago)
- Što Mi Noći Nemaju Svanuća (1992; 34 years ago)
- Zbogom Mala (1993; 33 years ago)
- Šta Ću Mala S Tobom (1994; 32 years ago)
- Tvoje Oči (1995; 31 years ago)
- Tebe Želim Noćas (1996; 30 years ago)
- Za Prošlu Ljubav (1997; 29 years ago)
- Ko Te Samo Takne (1998; 28 years ago)
- Tebi Ravno Sve Do Mora (1999; 27 years ago)
- Trebaš Mi (2000; 26 years ago)
- 12 Meseci (2001; 25 years ago)
- Opet Onaj Stari (2004; 22 years ago)
- Novembar 05 (2005; 21 years ago)
- 1 Na 1 (2006; 20 years ago)

Compilations:

- Usne vrele kao žar (ZaM, 1993; 33 years ago)
- Hitovi (Diskos, 1995; 31 years ago)
- Hitovi (ZaM, 2004; 22 years ago)
