= Evropa (album) =

Studio album by Stoja
- Released: 2001
- Genre: Folk, pop
- Label: Grand Production

Stoja chronology
Samo (2000)	Evropa (2001)	Zakletva (2003)

Evropa (English: Europe) is the fourth studio album by Bosnian Serb singer Stoja. It was released in 2001.

== Track listing ==
Divided into two: the first eight songs were new and first released on this album, while the last eight songs appeared on her previous albums and were bonuses on this album.

NEW SONGS

1. Evropa (Europe)
2. Umri (Die, featuring Pit Kordus on guitar)
3. Neka pati, sve nek' plati (Suffer, Pay For Everything)
4. Ne vraćam se ja na staro (I Won't Return to the Old)
5. Bolje i da ne vidim (Better If I Do Not See)
6. Idi nek' te sreća prati (Go, Let the Happiness Follow You)
7. Samo se jednom živi (You Only Live Once)
8. Mesec sija (The Moon is Shining)

OLD SONGS AS BONUS TRACKS

1. Samo (Only)
2. Sve što sam imala (Everything That I Had)
3. Svaka se greška plaća (Every Sin is Paid For)
4. Neću da ostarim (I Do Not Want to Grow Old, titled "Moje srce ostariti ne sme" (My Heart is Not Allowed to Age) on previous album)
5. Gori, gori stara ljubav (It Burns, It Burns, the Old Love)
6. Zajedno do kraja (Together Until the End, featuring Jovan Mihaljica)
7. Biću tvoja (I'll Be Yours, featuring Đani)
8. Ćiki, ćiki
