= Što svaka žena sanja =

Studio album by Hanka Paldum
- Released: 25 November 2013
- Genre: folk
- Label: Croatia Records

Hanka Paldum chronology
Žena kao žena (2004)	Što svaka žena sanja (2013)

Singles from Što svaka žena sanja
- 1. "Što svaka žena sanja" Released: 27 January 2012; 2. "Život je lijep" Released: 26 May 2013; 3. "Merak mi je" Released: 13 June 2013; 4. "Kad nas vide zagrljene" Released: 27 November 2013

Što svaka žena sanja (What Every Woman Dreams Of) is the seventeenth studio album by Bosnian folk singer Hanka Paldum. It was released 25 November 2013 through Hayat Production.

== Track listing ==
No.	Title	Writer(s)	Length
1.	"Merak mi je" (I Am Happy)	Mirko Šenkovski	3:17
2.	"Kada kiše zaplaču" (When Rain Cries)	Narcis Vučina	3:19
3.	"Kad nas vide zagrljene" (When They See Us Embrace (featuring Dragana Mirković))	Mirko Šenkovski	4:07
4.	"Zlatne žice" (Gold Wire)	Mirko Šenkovski	4:10
5.	"Ostani" (Stay)	Mirko Šenkovski	3:39
6.	"Život je lijep" (Life is Beautiful (featuring Cenk Bosnalı))	Cenk Bosnalı; Mirko Šenkovski	3:26
7.	"Ko si ti" (Who Are You)	Almir Ajanović	4:10
8.	"Ljubav na prvi pogled" (Love at First Sight)	Mirko Šenkovski	3:28
9.	"Ulica uspomena" (Street of Memories)	Mirko Šenkovski	3:44
10.	"Idi daleko" (Go Far Away)	Rade Krstić	4:31
11.	"Cvijete zlatni" (Golden Flower)	Rade Krstić	3:37
12.	"Što svaka žena sanja" (What Every Woman Dreams Of)	Mirko Šenkovski	3:42
13.	"Sofra" (Dinner Table (featuring Kemal Monteno))	Mirko Šenkovski	4:06

== Personnel ==
=== Production and recording ===
- Damir Bečić – arrangement (7)
- Almir Ajanović – arrangement (7)

== Release history ==
Region	Date	Label
Bosnia and Herzegovina	25 November 2013	Hayat Production
Croatia	8 January 2014	Croatia Records
Serbia	8 January 2014	Croatia Records
