= 5 (Stoja album) =

Studio album by Stoja
- Released: 2 June 2004
- Recorded: Studio Lucky Sound, Belgrade, Serbia
- Genres: Folk, pop
- Label: Grand Production

Stoja chronology
Zakletva (2003)	5 (2004)	Metak (2006)

5 was the sixth studio album by Bosnian Serb singer Stoja. It was released in 2004.

== Track listing ==
1. Starija (Older Woman)
2. Da isečeš vene (To Cut Your Veins)
3. Dijamanti (Diamonds)
4. Duplo piće (Double Drinks)
5. Do pola (In Half)
6. Govore mi tvoje oči (Your Eyes Tell Me)
7. Od splava do splava (From Raft to Raft)
8. Ne dam ti (I Won't Allow You)
