= Samo (Stoja album) =

Studio album by Stoja
- Released: 25 July 2000
- Genre: Folk, pop
- Label: Grand Production

Stoja chronology
Ćiki, ćiki (1999)	Samo (2000)	Evropa (2001)

Samo (English: Only) is the third studio album by Bosnian Serb singer Stoja. It was released in 2000.

== Track listing ==
The album contains 8 new songs as well as 4 old songs added on as bonus tracks:

NEW SONGS

1. Samo (Only)
2. Sve što sam imala (Everything That I Had)
3. Zajedno do kraja (Together Until the End, featuring Jovan Mihaljica)
4. Sve se okreće (Everything Goes Around)
5. Svaka se greška plaća (Every Sin is Paid For)
6. Nek' ti se plače danima (Spend Your Days Crying, featuring Joza Boček)
7. Iza lažnog osmeha (Behind a Fake Smile)
8. Teško mi je, jer je ljubav mržnja postala (It's Difficult For Me, Because Love Has Turned into Hate)

OLD SONGS AS BONUS TRACKS

1. Moje srce ostariti ne sme (My Heart is Not Allowed to Age)
2. Prevareni (Deceived)
3. Ćiki, ćiki
4. Ni kriva ni dužna (Not Guilty, Not Obliged)
