= Čežnja (album) =

Čežnja Yearning

Studio album by Hanka Paldum
- Released: 29 October 1980
- Recorded: June–September 1980
- Studio: Studio Bosna & KSC Ilidža
- Genre: folk, rock, pop, sevdalinka
- Label: Sarajevo Disk
- Producer: Nikola Borota Radovan

Hanka Paldum chronology
Sjajna zvijezdo (1980)	Čežnja; Yearning (1980)	Sanjam (1982)

Alternative cover

Čežnja (English: Yearning) is the fourth studio album by Bosnian folk singer Hanka Paldum. It was released 29 October 1980 through Sarajevo Disk.

== Background ==
After significant success with the single "Voljela sam, voljela", Hanka recorded another single, "Odreću se i srebra i zlata" (English: "I Will Give Up Silver and Gold") and at the same time was preparing her album, Čežnja, which was released in 1980. Along with Milić Vukašinović as the songwriter, and Nikola Borota as the producer, engineer and arranger, other recognized names from the world of folk, pop and rock music were present, such as Goran Bregović, Slobodan Kovačević, Mijat Božović and Blagoje Košanin. For the first time in Yugoslavian folk music, synthesizers, electric guitars and full drum kits were used.

With the song "Voljela sam, voljela" and the album Čežnja, new norms and standards were set in folk music, with the merger of folk and rock music and breaking of barriers between genres. Many music critics, composers and colleagues complained that this album undermined traditional folk music. However, Hanka, along with her team, believed in herself and her success and was certain that the material, even if unusual and nontraditional, was something new and possessed quality. That was confirmed later because Čežnja was overwhelmingly accepted by the public, broke many industry records, and sold over a million copies, and the songs in new folk-rock manner attracted listeners who never listened to her or folk music.

With a non-traditional business approach, Hanka started attracting the media as well as the public; as she promoted Čežnja during the Opatija festival of music, she also promoted it in Belgrade and had her first solo concert at Dom Sindikata. A tour of the whole of ex-Yugoslavia followed, and almost every song from the album was a hit, particularly "Crne kose" (Black Hair), "Zbog tebe" (Because of You), "Čežnja" (Yearning), and "Zbogom" (Farewell).

== Track listing ==
1. Hej, ljubavi (Brane Ikovic, Mijat Bojovic)
2. Ne traži me (Resad Hadrovic, Irfan Ajanovic)
3. Kamo sreće da ga nisam srela (Milic Vukasinovic)
4. Najdražoj ljubavi (Enver Sadinlija, Mirsad Ibric)
5. Čežnja (Hadrovic, Slobodan Kovacevic)
6. Zbog tebe (Slobodan Samardzic)
7. Bez ljubavi tvoje (Nedznad Esadnovic)
8. Hoću lijepe riječi (Gradimir Jovanovic, Aca Stepic)
9. Crne kose (Alija Mustajbegovic)
10. Zbogom (Ibro Mangafic)
