= Tebi ljubavi =

Studio album by Hanka Paldum
- Released: 27 March 1984
- Genre: folk, sevdalinka
- Label: Jugodisk
- Producer: Džemal Novaković

Hanka Paldum chronology
Dobro došli prijatelji (1983)	Tebi ljubavi (1984)	Nema kajanja (1985)

Tebi ljubavi (To You, My Love) is the seventh studio album by Bosnian folk singer Hanka Paldum. It was released 27 March 1984 through the record label Jugodisk.

== Track listing ==
1. Pamtim još
2. Moraš doći ove noći
3. Miris kose
4. Samo jednom ja odlazim
5. Pusti me, majko
6. Sarajevo, ostadoh bez riječi
7. Lažno su me voljele crne oči
8. Noćas si bol, noćas si želja
9. Dugo, dugo toplo ljeto
10. Balada mojoj majci
11. Prva ljubav
