= Od milion jedan =

Studio album by Dragana Mirković
- Released: 25 January 2017
- Recorded: 2016
- Genre: Folk, pop
- Label: City Records

Dragana Mirković chronology
20 (2012)	Od milion jedan (2017)

Od milion jedan (English: One In A Million) is the twenty-first studio album by Serbian singer Dragana Mirković. It was released on January 25, 2017. This is Dragana's first album in five years. She premiered a few of the songs on the Ami G Show and later these performances were uploaded on her YouTube Channel.

== Track listing ==
1. Od milion jedan (One in a Million)
2. On i ona (Him and Her)
3. Zagrli opet (Hug Again)
4. Krš i lom (Crash and Chaos)
5. Trebaš mi ti (I Need You)
6. Samo mi je dobro (I'm Just Fine)
7. Zašto me tražiš (Why Are You Searching For Me)
8. Lepi moj (My Beauty)
9. Zora (Dawn)
10. Idemo jako (Let's Go Hard)
11. Ti u meni imaš prijatelja (You Have a Friend in Me)
12. Jesen (Autumn)
13. Na tebe misliću (I'll Be Thinking of You)
14. Nismo uspeli mi (We Failed)
15. Nasmejana žena (A Smiling Woman)
