= Zakletva (album) =

Studio album by Stoja and Srki Boy
- Released: 21 May 2003
- Genre: Folk, pop
- Label: Grand Production
- Producer: Srki Boy

Stoja and Srki Boy chronology
Evropa (2001)	Zakletva (2003)	5 (2004)

Zakletva (English: Oath) is the fifth studio album by Serbian singer Stoja and was recorded with Srki Boy, who also produced it. It was released in 2003.

== Track listing ==
1. Zakletva (Oath)
2. Živeo (Long Live)
3. Da zavolim ludo... (To Fall Madly in Love...)
4. Moj život je moje blago (My Life is My Treasure)
5. O ne, ne, ne (Oh, No, No, No)
6. Samo idi (Just Leave)
7. Sava tiho teče (The Sava Quietly Flows)
8. Nije lako biti mlad (It's Not Easy Being Young)
