= Adnan Ahmedic =

Adnan Ahmedic Adnan Ahmedić
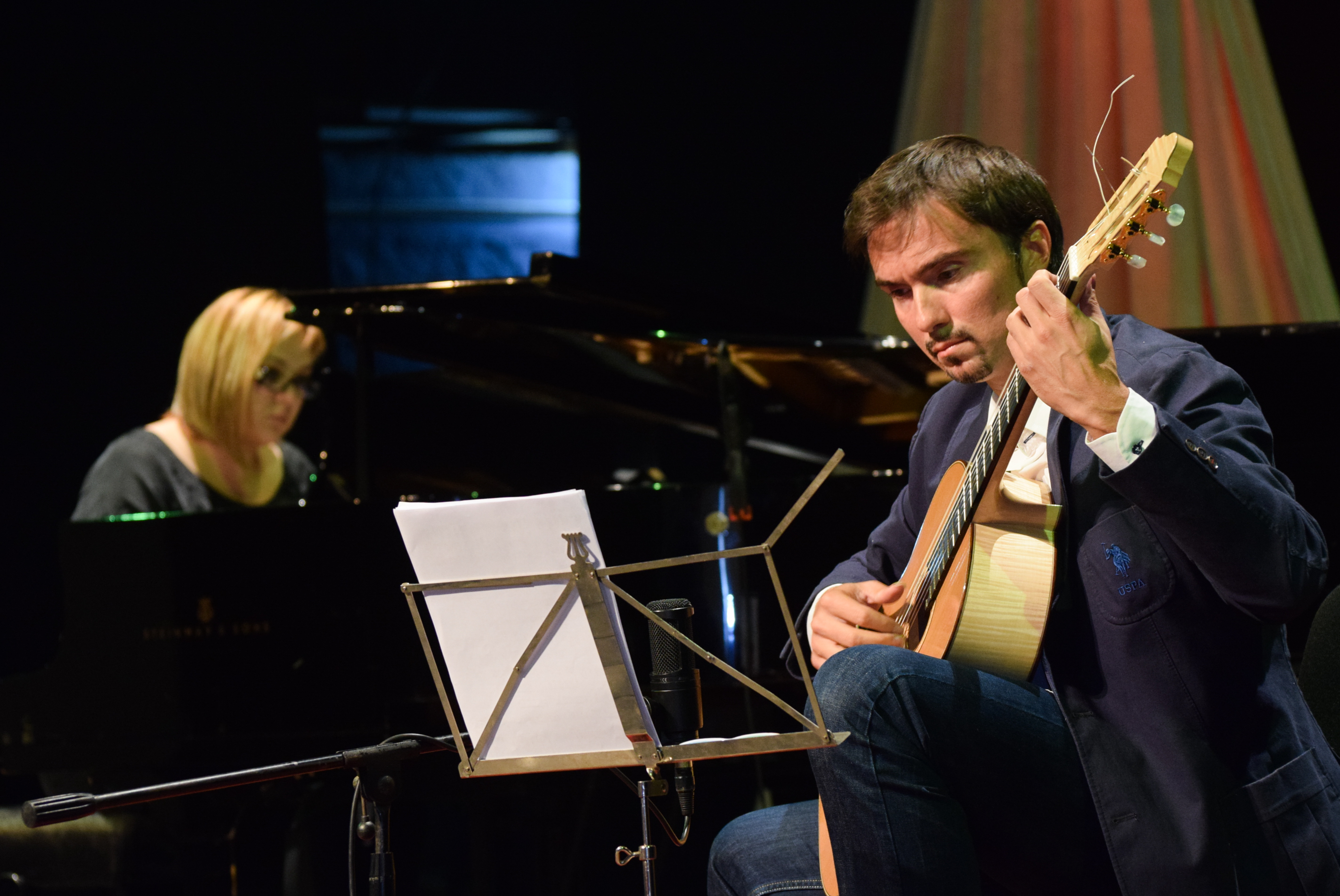

Background information
- Born: July 15, 1975 (age 50); Sarajevo, Bosnia and Herzegovina
- Genres: Classical
- Occupation: Musician
- Instrument: Classical guitar
- Website: Official website

Adnan Ahmedic (born 15 July 1975) is a classical guitarist born in Sarajevo, Bosnia and Herzegovina. Ahmedic gave recitals throughout Europe and Asia and also appeared as soloist with several chamber and symphonic orchestras.

== Classical guitarist Adnan Ahmedic ==
At an early age he was a pupil of classical guitarist Ivan Kalcina who inspired him to pursue guitar as his life calling. During the Bosnian War he moved first to Frankfurt, Germany, in 1994 and then to Vienna in 1996, where he attended and graduated with a degree from the Prayner Conservatory in 2002.

He oftentimes engages other musicians (most often pianists) and visual artists in exhibition shows, where they showcase their own work alongside him and this cross disciplinary approach gains him more attention in the public eye.

He is lately involved in cultural sector initiatives in Bosnia & Herzegovina, promoting cross-border cooperation and EU integration in area of culture, creation of European cooperation platforms, cultural networking. He performed in varies cities in China in 2018 and 2019 and made appearance in CHINA-CEEC SPRING FESTIVAL GALA

He does lot of transcription work, mainly of traditional, modern, world music, and national folk songs, notes for classical guitar that he published in three paper edition with IMKA Publishing Company called "Absolute Hits, Volume I, II, III"

Label: Sarajevo Disk

== Discography ==
=== Albums ===
- Fiesta
- Solo & Chamber
- Mediterranean Fusion

== Personal life ==
Ahmedic is also a tennis player, professionally playing on the ITF tour. He played tennis since he was 7.
