= Voljela sam oči nevjerne =

Studio album by Hanka Paldum
- Released: 13 February 1974
- Genre: folk, sevdalinka
- Label: Diskoton

Hanka Paldum chronology
Voljela sam oči nevjerne (1974)	Srebro i zlato (1979)

Voljela sam oči nevjerne (I Loved Unfaithful Eyes) is the debut studio album by Bosnian folk singer Hanka Paldum. It was released 13 February 1974 through the record label Diskoton.

== Track listing ==
1. Sve sam tebi dala
2. Voljela sam oči nevjerne (Zelene oči)
3. Jesen se naša vratiti neće
4. Vrbas
5. Burmu ću tvoju nositi
6. Od kako je Banja Luka postala
7. Ja te pjesmom zovem
8. Pokraj puta rodila jabuka
9. Još te volim
10. Živim za nas dvoje
11. Plakaću danas, plakaću sutra
12. Ne vraćaj se više
