= Sanjalice =

Yugoslav rock band

- Sanjalice in 1968

Background information
- Also known as: VIS Sanjalice
- Origin: Belgrade, SR Serbia, SFR Yugoslavia
- Genres: Beat music; rock; pop
- Years active: 1964–1969
- Labels: Jugoton, Diskos, Beograd Disk
- Past members: Ljiljana Mandić; Slobodanka Miščević; Ljiljana Jevtić; Vojislav Veljković; Radomir Vuković; Snežana Veselinović

Sanjalice (Serbian Cyrillic: Сањалице, trans. The Dreamers) were a Yugoslav rock band formed in Belgrade in 1964. Sanjalice are notable for being among of the pioneers of the Yugoslav rock scene, as well as one of the first Yugoslav all-female bands.

== History ==
Sanjalice were formed at the end of 1964, when three female friends, Ljiljana Mandić, Slobodanka Miščević and Ljiljana Jevtić, all three living in the same building, influenced by the Beach Boys and the Walker Brothers, decided to form a band . The band's first lineup consisted of Ljiljana Mandić (vocals, guitar), Slobodanka Miščević (rhythm guitar, vocals), Ljiljana Jevtić (bass guitar), Vojislav Veljković (drums), and Radomir Vuković (organ), most of them elementary school students at the time. Sanjalice had their first performance on 29 December 1964 in Belgrade's Pionirski Grad, performing alongside duo DD and singers Zoran Rambosek and Mirko Šuoc.

In 1965, the band performed, alongside the bands Lutalice, Četiri Bebe, Siluete, Plamenih 5, Juniori, Plavi Dečaci and Elipse, on the prominent Parada ritma festival. At the end of 1966, Vojislav Veljković left the band and went to serve his mandatory stint in the Yugoslav army, and was replaced by Snežana Veselinović, who was his girlfriend at the time. Not wanting to be the only male member of the band, Radomir Vuković left the band, and Sanjalice continued their activity without an organist, as one of the first all-female bands in Yugoslavia. Following his departure, Vuković completed his studies of architecture; in the early 1990s, he started the magazine Kvadrat (Square), and in 1999, he published his novel Znakovito (Symbolic). After Vuković left the group, as one of rare all-female rock bands in Yugoslavia, Sanjalice gained large attention of the Yugoslav media, but also praise from the country's music press.

On the competition of bands entitled Belgrade – Zagreb, held in 1967, they won the first place. During the same year, they performed on the highly popular festival tour Pesma leta (Song of the Summer), which featured popular Yugoslav pop music singers. Later during the year, Sanjalice performed on the fashion shows presenting the Simonida collection, inspired by Serbian medieval frescoes, by the Yugoslav designer Aleksandar Joksimović. When the Simonida collection was presented in Romania, the band traveled to the country to perform on the fashion shows, appearing also on Romanian national radio and television.

During the same year, they released their first EP, which featured the songs "Idem u svet" ("I'm Going to Travel the World", a cover of Wilma Goich's song "Per vedere quanto e' grande il mondo"), "Bez reči" ("Without Words"), "Nemoj reći da me voliš" ("Don't Say that You Love Me", a cover of Pino Donaggio's song "Io che non vivo (senza te)"), and "Mi mladi" ("We the Young"). The EP was released through Jugoton record labeel. Later that year, they released their second EP, with the songs "Marioneta" ("Marionette", a cover of Sandie Shaw song "Puppet on a String"), "Znam da ćeš se vratiti" ("I Know You Will Come Back"), "Haj, Lili, haj-lo", and "Srećni zajedno" ("Happy Together", a cover of The Turtles' "Happy Together"), through Diskos record label. By the end of 1967, the band had made more than 600 performances, and had several appearances on TV Belgrade, TV Zagreb and TV Ljubljana, some of them in children's program.

In 1968, the band was offered to perform in West Germany and Lebanon, which they refused to spend the summer performing on the Adriatic coast. They spent two months performing in Pula and other cities in Istria. During the same year, they released their third EP, with songs "Marijana" (originally a chanson composed by Vlaho Paljetak), "To su bili dani" ("Those Were the Days", a cover of Mary Hopkin's "Those Were the Days"), "Ta mala ledi" ("That Little Lady"), and "Misli ponekad na mene" ("Think of Me Sometimes"), through Beograd Disk. In 1968, Slobodanka Miščević sang the theme song for the film Pusti snovi (Pipedreams) directed by Soja Jovanović. The song was released on the EP Muzika iz filma Pusti snovi (Music from the Film Pipedreams).

During their career, Sanjalice often performed on fashion shows presenting clothes designed by Aleksandar Joksimović. They performed in the play Bitnici pevaju (Beatniks Are Singing), performed in the Đuro Salaj Theatre, in which actors Dragan Nikolić, Miša Janketić, Duško Golumbovski, and others recited the poetry of American beatniks translated by Jovan Ćirilov.

In 1969, the members of the band decided to end their activity and dedicate themselves to their studies.

A documentary film about the band, entitled Sanjalice and directed by Vladimir Petrović, premiered in 2024.

== Discography ==
=== Extended plays ===
- Idem u svet (1967)
- Marioneta (1967)
- Marijana (1968)
