= 20 (Dragana Mirković album) =

Studio album by Dragana Mirković
- Released: 4 December 2012
- Recorded: 2010–12
- Genre: Folk, pop
- Label: Zmex, Vujin

Dragana Mirković chronology
Eksplozija (2008)	20 (2012)	Od milion jedan (2017)

Singles from 20
- 1. "Drugovi" Released: May 2011; 2. "Jedini" Released: June, 2011; 3. "Mili, mili" Released: November 9, 2012; 4. "Ljubavi" Released: December 27, 2012; 5. "Kontinent" Released: February 1, 2013; 6. "Pucaj pravo u srce" Released: March 14, 2013; 7. "Mače" Released: June 14, 2013; 8. "Pustinja osećanja" Released: November 26, 2013; 9. "Hej živote" Released: August 9, 2014

20 is the twentieth studio album by Serbian singer Dragana Mirković. It was released in 2012.

== Music videos ==
The music videos for Jedini and Drugovi were released a year before the album:

- Jedini, 16 June 2011
- Drugovi was released on 9 November 2011. Drugovi was filmed in a 12th-century castle in the Austrian municipality of Ebenfurth. Filming lasted three days in the autumn of 2011.

A month before the release of 20, Mirković debuted new songs and music videos:

- Mili, mili was filmed in front of the Belgrade Arena in September 2012 and featured 45 dancers. The song and video were both officially released on the same day, 9 November 2012.
- Ljubavi, 27 December 2012.
- Kontinent, 1 February 2013.
- Pucaj pravo u srce, filmed in 2012 and released 14 March 2013.
- Mače, 14 June 2013.
- Pustinja osećanja, 26 November 2013.

== Track listing ==
1. Ljubavi (My Love)
2. Hej živote (Hey Life)
3. Kontinent (Continent)
4. Pustinja osećanja (Desert of Emotions)
5. Mače (Kitten)
6. Pokorno (Obediently)
7. Bagrem (Black Locust Tree)
8. Nemirno more (Restless Sea)
9. Amorova strela (Amor's Arrow)
10. Mili, mili (Dear, Dear)
11. Takav neće da se rodi (One Like That Will Not Be Born)
12. Pucaj pravo u srce (Shoot Right in My Heart)
13. Ostavljeni, prevareni (Abandoned, Deceived)
14. Suprotni svetovi (Opposite Worlds)
15. Srce vučije (A Wolf's Heart)
16. Dvadeset (Twenty)
17. Drugovi (Friends)
18. Srce moje (My Heart)
19. Jedini (One and Only)
20. Umreću zbog tebe (new version; I Will Die Because of You)
