= Sejo Kalač =

Yugoslavian pop-folk singer (born 1964)

- Born: Sead Kalač; 5 October 1964 (age 61); Rožaje, SFR Yugoslavia (modern-day, Montenegro)
- Citizenship: Montenegro; Croatia
- Occupation: Singer
- Years active: 1983–present
- Musical career
- Genres: Folk; pop-folk
- Instrument: Vocals
- Labels: PGP-RTB; Nimfa Sound; Grand Production; BN Music

Sead "Sejo" Kalač (born 5 October 1964) is a pop-folk singer.

== Career ==
Early in his professional career, he played the accordion in a band called "Paukova mreža" before landing a solo recording deal with the label PGP-RTB (later called PGP-RTS). The band played throughout the then-existing Yugoslavia in places such as restaurants, hotels and discothèques.

His first solo album, Ulica jorgovana (1991), was recorded in Belgrade, Serbia and his second album, Poletimo poletimo (1994), was recorded in Munich, Germany.

The recording of his third album, Alipašin izvor (1999), started in 1995 in Ljubljana, Slovenia but recording was put on hold until 1998. He then recorded a song entitled "Biščanka" and premiered it at a popular music festival in Bihać, Bosnia and Herzegovina.

Kalač has recorded duets with Serbian singer Stoja (a 2003 remake of his 2000 song "Tika tak") and Bosnian singer Šemsa Suljaković ("Lažu te"; first featured on her 2000 album Ne vjerujem nikom više, later re-released on his 2003 album Voda, vazduh i sloboda). Both duets were major successes. Kalač also recorded a song with the Serbian singer Jana called "Sunce sjalo" for her album Malo magije (2005).

He was the inspiration for a cattle character in the 2007 Serbian adult animated comedy film Jet Set.

== Personal life ==
Kalač lives in Offenbach, Germany and possesses Croatian and Serbian passports.

His brother, Caki Kalač, is also a singer. He is a very distant relative of singer and reality star Muhedin "Čupo" Kalač.

Sejo himself was offered to participate in Serbian reality shows Parovi (Couples) and Veliki brat (local production of Big Brother), but he rejected both opportunities, saying he did not want to participate in such a circus.

== Discography ==
Studio albums

- Ulica jorgovana (1991); released as "Sead Kalač"
- Poletimo poletimo (1994)
- Alipašin izvor (1997)
- Biščanka (2000)
- Dva života (2001)
- Baš ti (2002)
- Gradski momak (2003)
- Ala ala (2004)
- O mom rodnom kraju (2007)
- Dođe to iz duše (2009)

Compilation albums

- Najbolji Hitovi (2011) (greatest hits album)

Ulica jorgovana (1991)

1. Sta su žene pitaj druže mene
2. Ulica jorgovana
3. Praznina u duši
4. Decembar je bio
5. Opasno je to sto radiš
6. Zbog tebe se i čaša prolila
7. Samo ti si ona prava
8. Neka žive moji stari

Poletimo poletimo (1994)

1. Poletimo, poletimo
2. Bol bolujem u tuđini
3. Volim da kockam
4. Šeila kćeri mila
5. Glave lude
6. Pustite me da se napijem
7. Digni glavu prijatelju
8. Majko utješi me

Alipašin izvor (1997)

1. Alipašin izvor
2. Merima
3. Potraži me
4. Pusti me da živim
5. Ljuta na mene
6. Život mi je uništila
7. Bila si mi prva ljubav
8. Budi moja ove noći

Bišćanka (2000)

1. Lele, lele
2. Pobjegla je sreća
3. Takva se žena jednom rađa
4. Emina
5. Tika tak
6. Prevariću život
7. Oprostaj
8. Biščanka
9. Ljubi me
10. Pjesma za tebe
11. Ljubav i kocka
12. U krug
13. Crna udovica

Dva života (2001)

1. Ne volim da gubim
2. Uvijek dobro činio sam svima
3. Lažu da je vino lijek
4. Mađije
5. Aman, aman
6. Alipašin izvor
7. Sretan ti rođendan
8. Kapi kiše
9. Istanbul
10. Rodila se ljubav
11. Reci da znam
12. Eh što nemam dva života
13. Kajundžijo baci prsten
14. Svatovska

Baš ti (2002)

1. Baš ti
2. Idi ženo iz života moga
3. Kraljica
4. To nije fer
5. Bolje da sam pijan nego lud
6. Daj mi daj
7. Imam brata
8. Kafanska pjevačica

Voda, vazduh i sloboda (2003)

1. Voda vazduh i sloboda
2. Polomiću sve sto je od stakla
3. Fajront
4. Lažu te (featuring Šemsa Suljaković, song first featured on her 2000 album, Ne vjerujem nikom više)
5. Ne vjerujem ženi sa plavim očima
6. Gradski momak
7. Tika tak (featuring Stoja)
8. Šeila
9. Neka pati

Ala, ala (2004)

1. Ala, ala
2. Drugovi moji dobri su momci
3. Da li si me voljela ili nisi
4. E moj ćale
5. Bogata sirotica
6. Daj daj dodaj
7. A jesam te volio
8. Ovo je pjesma za tebe ljubavi moja

O mom rodnom kraju (2007)

1. Alipašin izvor
2. Bol bolujem
3. Što nema omladine
4. Hej plave plave
5. Ameriko prokleta si
6. Gdje je omladina
7. Teško je i meni majko

Dođe to iz duše (2009)

1. Apsolutno tačno
2. Dođe to iz duše
3. Mogu bez tebe
4. Kupi mi Crnu Goru
5. Nisam fer
6. Noćni čovjek
7. Znaš li, znaš li brate, brate
8. Sirotinjo
9. Dođe to iz duše RMX

As featured artist

- Lažu te (2000) with Šemsa Suljaković
- Sunce sjalo (2005) with Jana
