= Dobro došli prijatelji =

Dobro došli prijatelji Welcome, Friends

Studio album by Hanka Paldum
- Released: 24 January 1983
- Genre: folk, sevdalinka
- Label: Jugodisk
- Producer: Milić Vukašinović

Hanka Paldum chronology
Sanjam (1982)	Dobro došli prijatelji Welcome, Friends (1983)	Tebi ljubavi (1984)

Dobro došli prijatelji (Welcome, Friends) is the sixth studio album by Bosnian folk singer Hanka Paldum. It was released 24 January 1983 through the record label Jugodisk.

== Track listing ==
1. Dobro došli, prijatelji
2. Neću oproštaj da ti dam
3. Htio si sam
4. Žena kao ja
5. Usne moje da te ljube
6. Kako opet voljeti
7. Ne ljubi me noćas, mili
8. Ko je krivac, ti il’ ja
