= DM Sat =

Serbian television channel

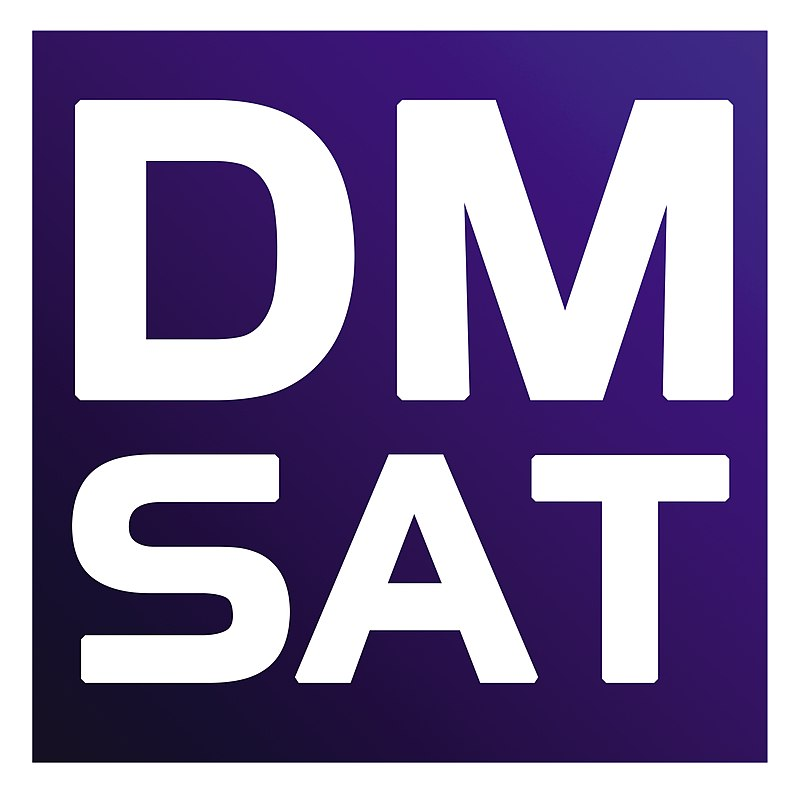
- Logo, one (front) side /sketch/
- Country: Serbia
- Broadcast area: International
- Headquarters: Požarevac, Serbia

Programming
- Picture format: 4:3 (SD)

Ownership
- Sister channels: DM Sat Plus

History
- Former names: SAT TV

Links
- Website: www.dmsat.tv

DM Sat is a popular cable-satellite music video and entertainment channel broadcast from Požarevac, Serbia.

The channel was founded by Dragana Mirković and her Bosnian husband Anton Toni Bijelić, using facilities from the previously defunct SAT TV station, also located in Požarevac.

DM Sat is available in many Balkan countries, over both satellite and cable television. The channel runs an SMS text messaging program, where viewers are able to send a text message via their mobile phone that is then displayed live on the channel. Viewers can send a message from more than 35 countries requesting songs or chatting with the program director.
