= Rođa Raičević =

- Born: Rodoljub Raičević; 11 July 1957; Nikšić, FPR Yugoslavia
- Died: 7 October 2001 (aged 44) Belgrade, FR Yugoslavia
- Genres: Pop music, Turbo-folk

Rodoljub Raičević (Serbian Cyrillic: Рођа Раичевић; 11 July 1957 – 7 October 2001) was a Serbian/Montenegrin singer. He was active in the 90s. He recorded four studio albums.

His first album appeared in 1993, and became a success. It had hits such as "Tako je suđeno" and "A ja imam tebe". Raičević gained fans throughout the Balkans. After his death in 2001, the mystery of a suitcase that was in front of his apartment remained unsolved.

== Discography ==
- Tako je suđeno (1993)
- Običan muškarac (1994)
- Sudnji dan (1997)
- Da Bog da (2001)
