= Sarajevo Disk =

- Founded: 1978
- Status: Currently active; was inactive between 2000–2012
- Genre: Various
- Country of origin: Bosnia and Herzegovina
- Location: Sarajevo, Bosnia and Herzegovina

Sarajevo Disk is a record label founded and based in Sarajevo, Bosnia and Herzegovina in 1978 by Hanka Paldum, Muradif "Mufta" Brkić and Ishak "Braco" Džirlo. It became inactive in 2000 and began releasing music again in September 2012.

== Artists ==
- Sinan Alimanović
- Adnan Ahmedic
- Halid Bešlić
- Hanka Paldum
- Hari Mata Hari
- Hari Varešanović
- Hašim Kučuk Hoki
- Mile Kitić
- Neda Ukraden
- Šaban Šaulić
- Šerif Konjević
- Toma Zdravković
- Vatreni Poljubac
- Zaim Imamović
- Zlata Petrović
- Salem Sihirlić

== See also ==
- Sarajevo Diskoton
