= Zekerijah Đezić =

- Pictured in 1969
- Born: 14 November 1937; Janja, Kingdom of Yugoslavia
- Died: 17 October 2002 (aged 64); Sarajevo, Bosnia and Herzegovina
- Resting place: Alifakovac cemetery, Sarajevo
- Other name: Đeza
- Occupation: Singer
- Years active: 1960–96
- Musical career
- Genres: sevdalinka; Bosnian folk
- Instrument: vocals
- Labels: Jugoton; PGP RTB; RTV Sarajevo; Beograd Disk

Zekerijah Đezić (14 November 1937 – 17 October 2002) was a Bosnian folk singer. In 1964, Đezić became the first citizen of Tuzla to have their voice recorded on a gramophone record with the release of his first song "Tuzlanka se Sarajkama hvali" (The Tuzla Girl Brags to the Sarajevo Girls). He was posthumously awarded the Davorin award in 2003.

== Early life ==
Đezić was born into a Bosniak family in Janja, near Bijeljina, Bosnia and Herzegovina. His mother Hanifa died in February 1965.

== Career ==
Before striking a record deal with Jugoton, Zekerijah worked as a hotel singer in Tuzla, Bijeljina and Zagreb. He relocated to Sarajevo in 1959, singing in hotels for a few months before moving back to Tuzla in March 1960 and signing with Radio Tuzla.

He retired on 25 April 1996.

== Death ==
Zekerijah Đezić died on 17 October 2002 after a prolonged illness. He is buried at the Alifakovac cemetery in Sarajevo.

== Discography ==
=== Studio albums ===
- Dođi, pjesmo moja (1974)

=== EP's and singles ===
- Razbole se care Sulejmane (1964)
- Razbolje se šimšir list (1966) with Narodni Orkestar Žarka Milanovića
- Splavar sa Drine (1967)
- Među nama svršeno je sve (1968)
- Vojnička pesma (1969)
- Ne plači jedina / Banja Luka (1970) with Ansambl Spase Beraka
- Nemoj nikad reći zbogom (1970)
- Puknite strune (1971)
- Od Sarajki ljepših žena nema (1972)
- Volimo se svi (1972)
- Dođi pjesmo moja (1973)
- Druže stari (1973)
