= Cerani, Derventa =

Cerani
- Village
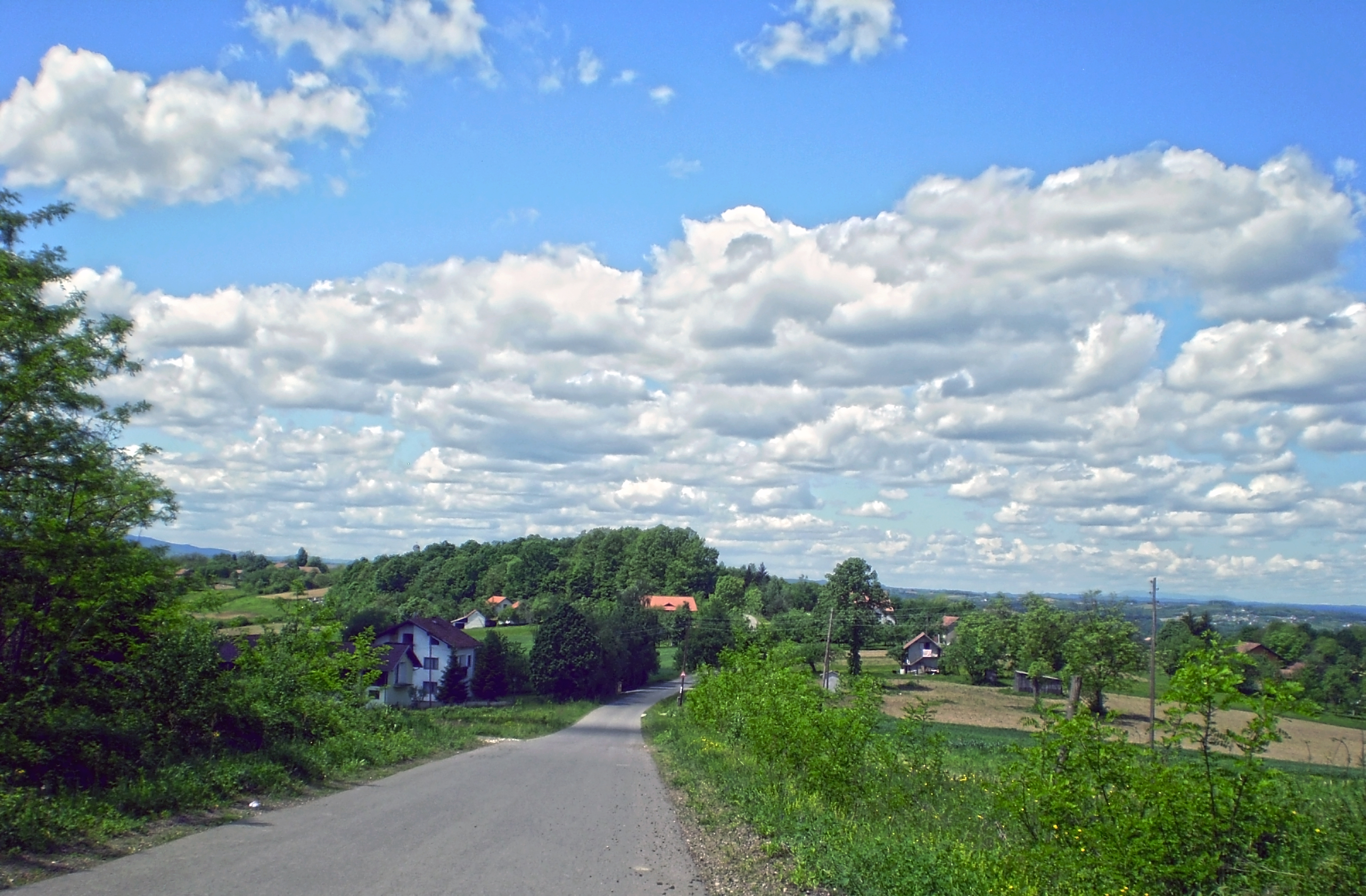

- Location within Bosnia and Herzegovina
- Coordinates: 44°52′21″N 17°51′09″E
- Country: Bosnia and Herzegovina
- Entity: Republika Srpska
- Municipality: Derventa
- Time zone: UTC+1 (CET)
  - Summer (DST): UTC+2 (CEST)

Cerani (Serbian: Церани) is a village in the municipality of Derventa, Bosnia and Herzegovina.
