= Mile Kitić =

Bosnian musician (born 1952)

Mile Kitić Миле Китић
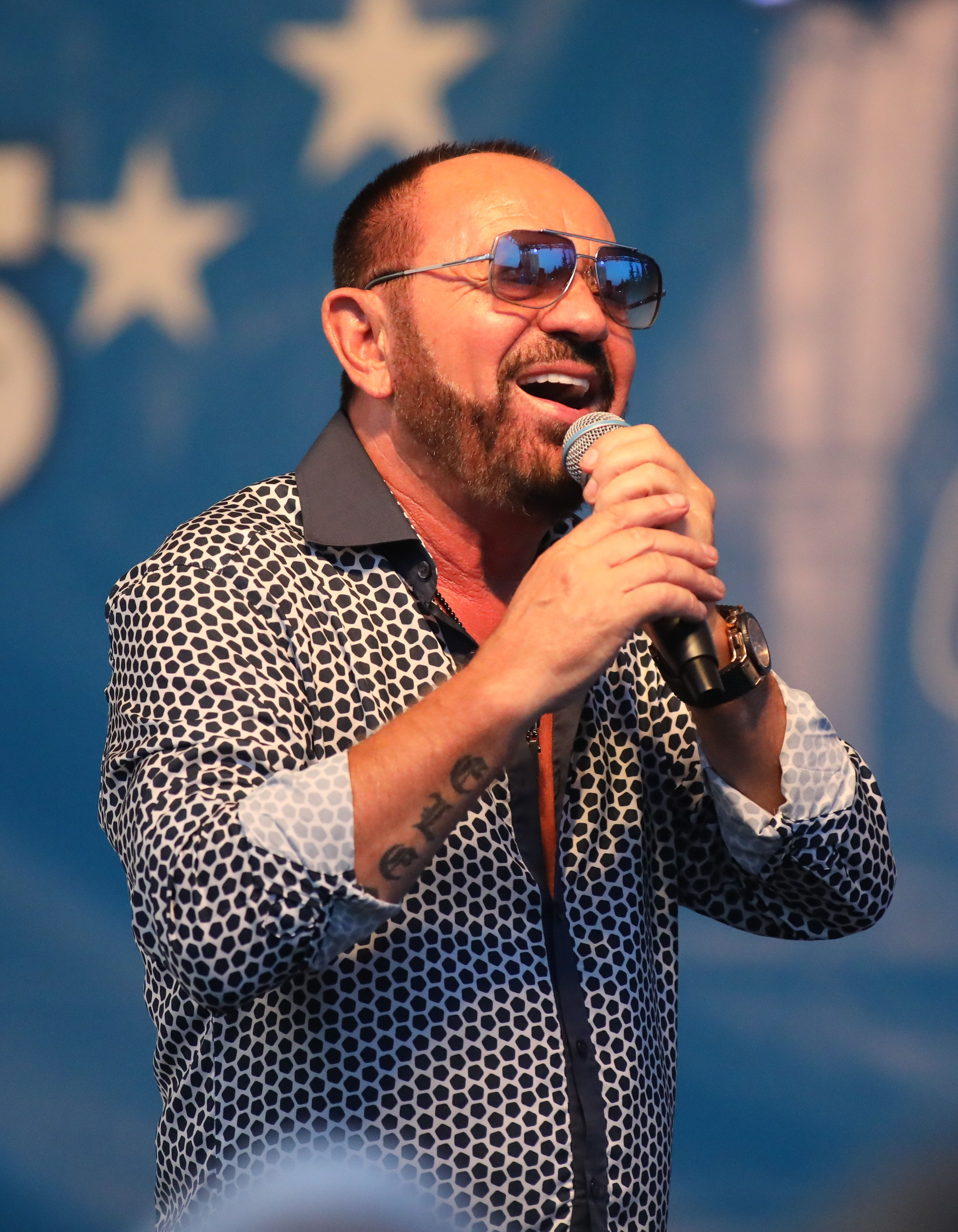
- Kitić performing in 2021

Background information
- Born: Milojko Kitić; 1 January 1952 (age 74); Cerani, PR Bosnia and Herzegovina, FPR Yugoslavia
- Genres: Folk
- Occupation: Singer
- Years active: 1974–present
- Labels: Diskos; Južni Vetar; PGP RTB; Grand

Milojko "Mile" Kitić (Serbian Cyrillic: Милојко "Миле" Китић; born 1 January 1952, is a Bosnian-born Serbian folk singer. He rose to prominence as a member of the popular eighties folk collective Južni Vetar, with fellow folk singers Sinan Sakić, Dragana Mirković, Kemal Malovčić and Šemsa Suljaković.

== Life and career ==
Kitić was born on New Year's Day, 1952, in the village of Cerani near the town of Derventa, People's Republic of Bosnia and Herzegovina, Federal People's Republic of Yugoslavia. He graduated from the Traffic Technical School in Sarajevo and initially wanted to be a physical education teacher. He started singing and performing after high school.

His first release was "Čija si ljubav" (Whose Love Are You) and "Ja želim da sam sunce" (I Want To Be The Sun) in 1975. His debut album was released in 1982. He joined Južni Vetar in 1984 and gained almost instant success with the album and single "Čaša ljubavi" (Glass of Love). While in the group he also collaborated with fellow Yugoslav folk singers Sinan Sakić, Dragana Mirković, Kemal Malovčić and Šemsa Suljaković.

During the Bosnian War of the 1990s, he and his family fled to Belgrade.

== Personal life ==
Kitić has two daughters from two marriages and two granddaughters from his firstborn. He resides in Belgrade and Hanover with his second wife Marta Savić, also a well-known singer; their daughter Elena Kitić is an R&B singer.

== Discography ==
- Moja slatka mala (1982)
- Jorgovani plavi (1983)
- Čaša ljubavi (1984)
- Ja neću ljepšu (1985)
- Kockar (1986)
- Mogao sam biti car (1987)
- Što da ne (1988)
- Osvetnik (1989)
- Stavi karte na sto (1990)
- Gledaj me u oči (1991)
- Ćao, Jelena (1992)
- Vuk samotnjak (1993)
- Moj sokole (1994)
- Okreni jastuk (1995)
- Ratnik za ljubav (1996)
- Ostaj ovde (1997)
- Do sreće daleko, do Boga visoko (1998)
- Tri života (1999)
- Zlato, srebro, dukati (2000)
- Plava ciganko (2001)
- Budi moja (2001)
- Policijo, oprosti mi (2003)
- Zemljotres (2004)
- Šampanjac (2005)
- Šanker (2008)
- Paklene godine (2012)
- Rakija (2013)
- Nokaut (2014)
- Mađioničar (2017)

== See also ==
- Music of Bosnia
- List of Bosnia and Herzegovina people#Music
- Turbo-folk
