= Đani =

Serbian singer

Đani Ђани
- Also known as: Djani
- Born: Radiša Trajković; 27 January 1973 (age 53); Lipljan, SAP Kosovo, SR Serbia, Yugoslavia (modern-day Serbia)
- Genres: Turbo-folk
- Instrument: Vocals
- Years active: 1995–present

Radiša Trajković (Serbian Cyrillic: Радиша Трајковић; born 27 January 1973), known by the stage name Đani (Serbian Cyrillic: Ђани), is a popular Serbian pop-folk singer. He was born in Lipjan and attended school there.

He is married to Slađana. He is stepfather to her son from her previous marriage.

== Discography ==
- Ulica je moj dom (1995)
- Ta žena (1998)
- Otišla si, e pa neka (2000)
- Neka pati žena ta (2001)
- Druga dva (2003)
- Sam sam (2004)
- Sve mi tvoje nedostaje (2005)
- Balkanac (2007)
- Još te sanjam (2010)
