= Aleksandar Kobac =

Serbian composer and arranger (born 1971)

Aleksandar Kobac (born 25 April 1971, in Belgrade) is a Serbian composer and arranger. In a fifteen year career, he wrote more than three thousand songs and over three hundred hits. In 2005 he participated with group Flamingosi and song "Crazy summer dance" on the Beovizija festival. In 2008, he participated with Stefan Filipovic and song "Forever love" in the Eurovision Song Contest. In 2009, he participated together with Marko Kon and Milan Nikolic with song "Shoe" on the Beovizija festival and in the same year in Moscow again in the Eurovision Song Contest. Aleksandar Kobac has cooperated with Bulgarian, Macedonian, Montenegro, Bosnian and Croatian singers. He is doing music for TV show like Ciao Darwin, Amiga Show, and also industrial and advertising music.
