= Južni Vetar (band) =

Bosnian-Serbian music band

Južni Vetar (Serbian Cyrillic: Јужни Ветар, "Southern Wind") is a Serbian (formerly Yugoslav) folk band famous for recording with many famous folk, pop-folk and turbo-folk singers from Serbia and Bosnia and Herzegovina. The band was founded by Miodrag M. Ilić (nicknamed Mile Bas), an experienced musician from Leskovac, a town in southern Serbia (hence the name "Southern Wind").

Its members consisted of Miodrag M. Ilić as the bass guitarist, Sava Bojić as lead guitarist and Perica Zdravković for keyboard, while its singers included Dragana Mirković, Šemsa Suljaković, Kemal Malovčić, Sinan Sakić, and Mile Kitić. The band's golden age lasted from 1982 until 1991, when the beginning of Yugoslav Wars forced the members to split. As the ideals of "brotherhood and unity" in Yugoslav society began to wane during the mid-1980s, the band embraced the "Yugoslav" identity through its diversity. Its mixture of folk music and "oriental" sounds led to mass popularity. The band reached the peak of its popularity with the 1986 album "Pristajem na sve", which sold over 500.000 copies. One of the band's singers, Šemsa Suljaković, recorded a solo album "Što me pitaš kako živim", which officially sold 1 million copies.
