= Šemsa Suljaković =

Bosnian folk singer

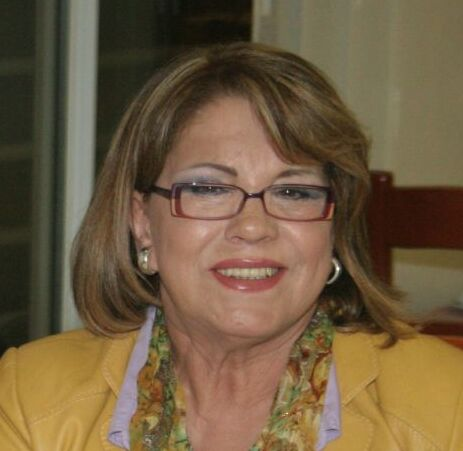

Background information
- Born: Šemsa Suljaković; 29 September 1951 (age 74); Maglaj, PR Bosnia and Herzegovina, FPR Yugoslavia
- Genres: Folk, turbo-folk, pop-folk
- Occupation: Singer
- Years active: 1971–present
- Labels: PGP-RTB, Diskos, Nimfa Sound, Grand Production, Južni Vetar
- Formerly of: Južni Vetar

Šemsa Suljaković (born 29 September 1951) is a Bosnian folk singer.

== Early life ==
Šemsa Suljaković was born in Maglaj, SR Bosnia and Herzegovina, SFR Yugoslavia. She is the eldest of six children in an ethnic Bosniak family.

== Career ==
Suljaković's singing career began after her mother moved the family into their grandparents' home in the Širokača neighborhood of Sarajevo. Their neighbor, Sena, was a folk singer married to an accordionist who performed at a local kafana frequently. One night, Sena persuaded Šemsa to come with her to the kafana. That night, Šemsa discovered her talent for singing. The next day, the owner of the kafana asked her to start singing there nightly. Her music career officially began in 1971.

Suljaković recorded her first extended play (EP) Otišla je ljubav s našeg kućnog praga / Ja zbog tebe sve (The Love Is Gone From Our Doorstep / I Do Everything Because of You) in 1978, with lyrics written by Rade Vučković and music by Šaban Šaulić, along with the music ensemble of Aca Stepić. She continued singing in the kafana while her songs received airplay. The two songs did well, but the success did little for Suljaković's professional career as the public assumed the singer was Branka Stanarčić, another performer, due to similarities in their voices.

Her second EP, Gledam sretne ljude / Šta je s tobom u poslednje vrijeme (I Look at Happy People / What's Gotten Into You Recently), was released in 1980.

She achieved fame with the musical group Južni Vetar; the band's first commercial hit came in 1981 with Suljaković as the singer. Throughout the 1980s, Šemsa and her band held countless concerts at venues, fairs, weddings and multiple other places.

Šemsa's biggest hits are "Pristajem na sve", "Zašto si se napio", "Sirotinja ljude svađa", "Zar za mene nema sreće", "Volele se oči crne i zelene" (in Ekavian), "Južni ritam", "Kako da ti pomognem", "Javi se, oteraj tugu" (in Ekavian), "Prođi sa mnom ispod duge", as well as "Što me pitaš", "Mi se volimo" (with Mile Kitić), "Ne, ne", "Razbio si čašu", "Sanjam", and "Lažu te" (with Sejo Kalač). Her recent (2019) song with music video is "Akšam pade niz mahalu".

== Personal life ==
Suljaković had a son at the age of 16 with her then-husband, a musician whom she later divorced. She later married another man, an accordionist from Šabac; the two divorced. Today, Suljaković lives today in Strängnäs, Sweden.

== Discography ==
Single & EPs

- Otišla je ljubav s našeg kućnog praga / Ja zbog ja zbog tebe sve (1978)
- Tri pupoljka / Priđi malo bliže (1980)
- Gledam sretne ljude / Šta je s tobom u posljednje vrijeme (1980)

Albums

- Verna u ljubavi (1982)
- Uzmi me majko u krilo tvoje (1983)
- Prevareni ne veruju više (1984)
- Srce ću ti dati (1985)
- Pristajem na sve (1986)
- Baš me briga (1987)
- Razbio si čašu (1988)
- Prođi sa mnom ispod duge (1989)
- Izdali me prijatelji (1990)
- 7000 suza (1991)
- Vjerovala sam (1993)
- Moje vrijeme došlo je (1998)
- Ne vjerujem nikom više (2000)
- Južni ritam (2002)
- Tako to žene rade (2005)
- Kada odem (2007)
