= Dragana Mirković =

Serbian pop-folk singer and entrepreneur (born 1968)

Dragana Mirković Драгана Мирковић
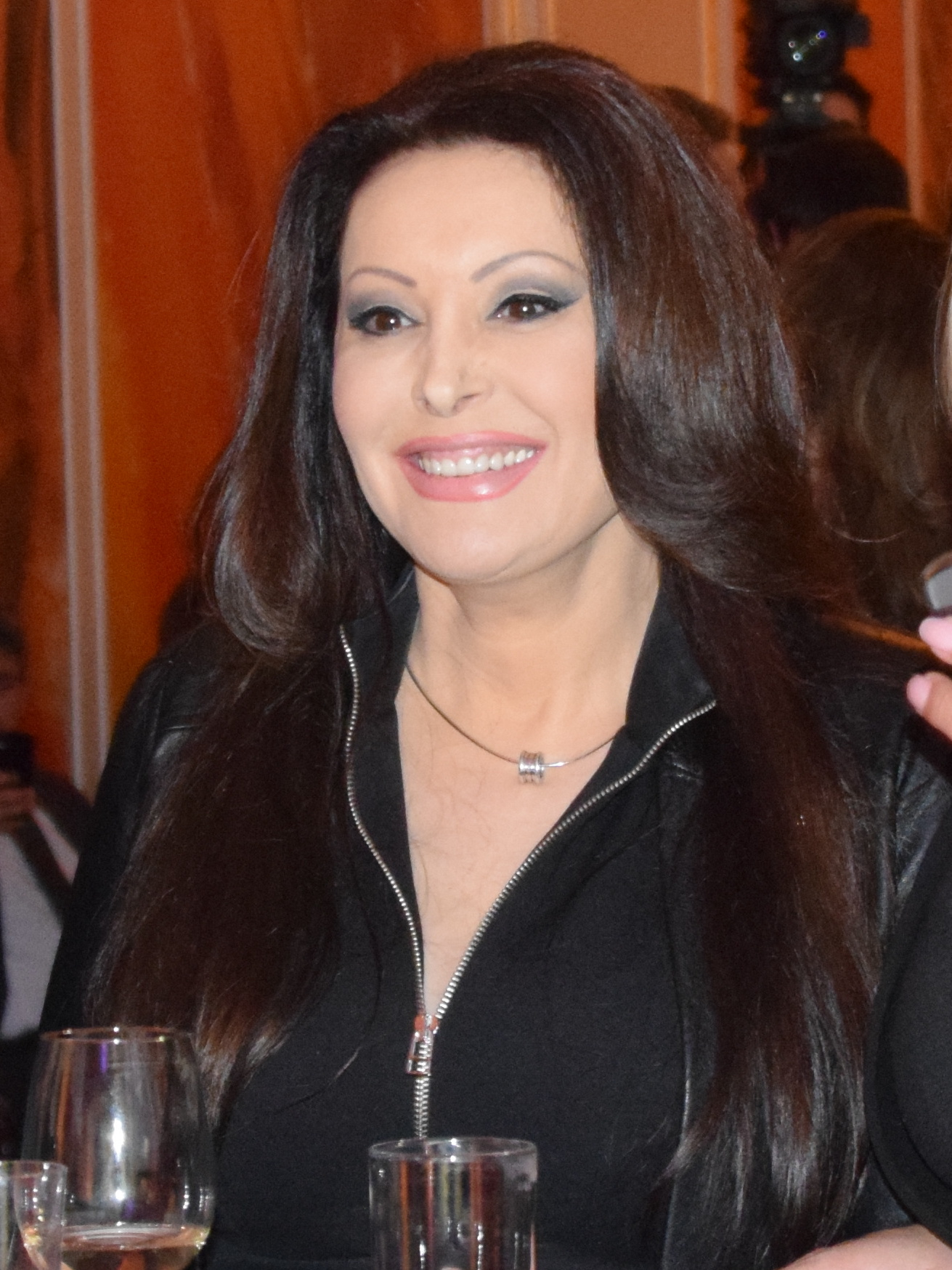
- Mirković in 2015

Background information
- Born: Dragana Mirković; 18 January 1968 (age 58); Kasidol, SR Serbia, Yugoslavia
- Genres: Folk; Turbo-folk
- Occupations: Singer; businesswoman
- Instrument: Vocals
- Years active: 1984–present
- Labels: Diskos; PGP-RTB; Južni Vetar; Grand; City; Komuna; Vujin; Zmex
- Website: www.dragana.at
- Spouse: Toni Bijelić (m. 2000; div. 2024)
- Children: 2

Dragana Mirković (Serbian Cyrillic: Драгана Мирковић, pronounced [drǎɡana mǐːrkɔ̝v̞it͡ɕ]; born 18 January 1968) is a Serbian pop-folk singer and entrepreneur. She rose to prominence in the eighties as a member of the popular collective Južni Vetar. Mirković is recognised as one of the most successful artists from the former Yugoslavia, with collective sales of 10 million records. Alongside her husband, she also founded a satellite music channel called DM SAT.

== Life and career ==
=== Early life ===
Mirković was born on 18 January 1968, in Kasidol, a village near Požarevac, SR Serbia, SFR Yugoslavia. The youngest of two children, she grew up in the same household as her parents, grandparents and sister Dušica. Mirković has described her upbringing as "Yugoslav", noting the peaceful co-existence between Slavs of different faiths at the time. A musical influence in her youth was her grandfather, Dragutin, who played the accordion. At the age of five, she learned to sing the Bosnian folk song "Djevojka sokolu zulum učinila". Mirković recalled that she cried because of the events portrayed in the song. As a child, she began singing as a soloist in elementary school performances and competitions. Later, she would sing at various celebrations in Kasidol, which caught the attention of record executives.

=== 1984–1991: Early success and Južni vetar ===
When she was 14, executives at the Diskos record label approached Mirković's parents with the idea of having her record a song in their studio. The result was Imam dečka nemirnog, which was released as a full studio album in 1984. Her second studio album Umiljato oko moje was released in 1985 and sold 250,000 copies. In the mid-1980s, Mirković began her collaboration with the music band Južni Vetar, composed of Miodrag Ilić as the bass guitarist, Sava Bojić lead guitarist and Perica Zdravković for keyboard. Spasi me samoće, which was released in 1986, was her first studio album with the group and sold over 400,000 copies. In addition to Mirković, the musical formation utilized other singers from Bosnia and Serbia and received widespread support from Yugoslavs, as folk music became the best-selling genre of the 1980s. She went on to record four more albums with Južni Vetar: Ruže cvetaju samo u pesmama (1987), Najlepši par (1988), Simpatija (1989) and Pomisli želju (1990). The single "Simpatija" (Crush) became a major commercial success.

=== 1990s: Solo success ===
In 1991, Mirković released her eighth studio album (and third solo project), Dobra devojka, which featured two major hit singles: "Umreću zbog tebe" and "Kazi mi sunce moje". The album was followed by Dolaze nam bolji dani in 1992, which featured multiple hit songs, "Umirem majko", "Pitaju me u mom kraju", "Da, da, da", and "O, da li znaš". Mirković's tenth studio album, Do poslednjeg daha, was released in 1993, which featured numerous hit singles, such as "Do poslednjeg daha", “Bas tebe volim ja”, "Bicu njegova", “and "Vetrovi tuge". In 1994, she released her eleventh studio album, Nije tebi do mene, which included multiple hit singles such as, "Nisam ni metar od tebe", "Varala bih, varala" and "Opojni su zumbuli". The same year, Mirković starred in the feature film, Slatko od snova, playing the role of a girl who works in a fast food restaurant and dreams of becoming a famous singer.

Mirković released four more albums in the 1990s: Plači, zemljo (1995), which featured the hit singles, "I u dobru i u zlu", "Vrati mi se ti", "Uzeo si moja jutra" and "Divlja devojka", Nema promene (1996), with hit singles, "Dušu si mi opio", "To nije tvoja stvar" and "Oči pune tuge", and Kojom gorom (1997), with songs like "Poslednje veče", "Dolina kestenova", and the title track. Her final release of the 1990s was, U godini (1999), a collaborative album with Zlaja Band. After the release of her seventeenth studio album, Sama, which featured the hit singles, "Svatovi", and the title track, she went on a four-year hiatus. In 2001, Mirković performed live at the Vienna Künstlerhaus as part of a contemporary art exhibition, with many of those in attendance being Yugoslav migrant workers.

=== 2004–2017: Return ===
In 2004, Mirković returned with her seventeenth studio album, Trag u vremenu. The comeback album featured multiple hit singles, including "Tamo gde je milo moje", "Evo dobro sam", "Zašto zoro svanjavaš" and "Preživeću". In 2006, she released her eighteenth studio album, Luče moje, featuring the hit singles "Pečat na usnama", "Na kraju", "Sudbina" and "Luce moje". In 2008, she released Eksplozija, which featured the singles, "Laste", "Zemljo okreni se", "Sve bih dala da si tu", and "Život moj".

In 2011, she released three new songs and a remake of an old song of hers. "Drugovi", "Srce moje" and "Jedini", were all released to critical acclaim. The remake of her 1991 song, "Umreću zbog tebe" was well received. The four songs, along with sixteen new ones, were featured on her twentieth studio album, 20, which was released in 2012. In 2014, Mirković released a duet with José Feliciano titled "Please Don't Go Away". The same year, she held a concert at Štark Arena in front of 20,000 fans to celebrate the 30th anniversary of her music career. In 2017, she released her twenty-first studio album, Od milion jedan.

On 22 March 2024, she performed at the Morača center in Podgorica where she received a standing ovation from the audience. Her concert was described as a "spectacle".

== Other ventures ==
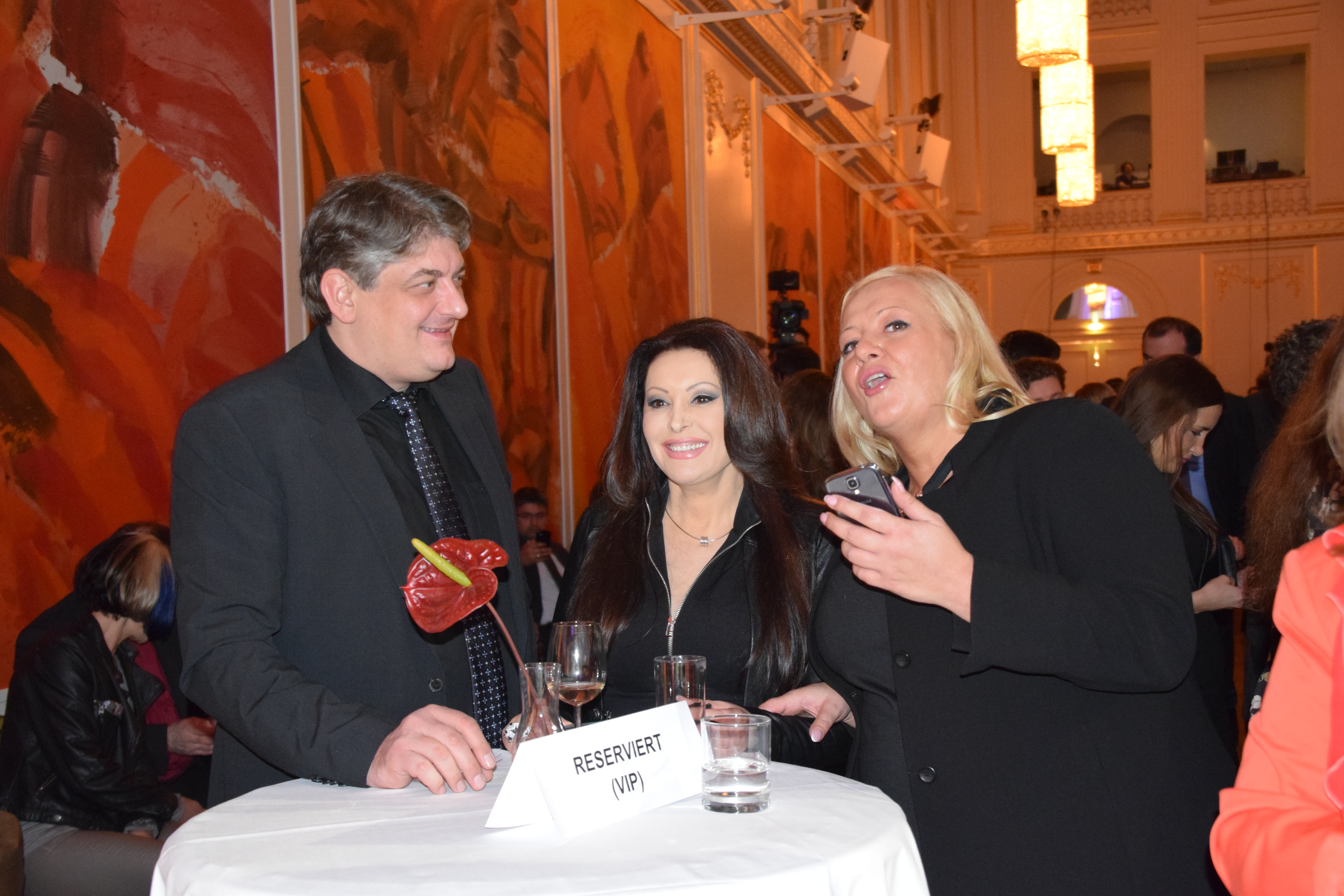
Mirković (middle) with her husband and friend, 29 January 2015.

In 2005, Mirković and her husband Toni Bijelić founded DM SAT, a satellite music video channel.

Mirković held a humanitarian concert in Zenica, Bosnia on 7 November 2012 in the Arena Zenica. The concert, called "Dragana and Friends for Zenica", also featured singers Hanka Paldum, Boban Rajović, Halid Muslimović, and the band Plavi orkestar. The concert raised around €26,500 (about $36,500 US dollars) for the People's Kitchen. The following month, Serbian tabloids claimed that "local politicians" in Zenica had taken €7,500 of the money to pay for renting out the arena, and another €11,500 for the sound system, leaving only about €7,500 of the money to charity. The tabloids claimed that the majority of the money went for the politicians' personal use. During the concert, Mirković and Hanka Paldum first publicly sang their duet "Kad nas vide zagrljene" (When They See Us Embrace). The song officially premiered one year later on 26 November 2013, when the music video was released. The song was featured prominently in Serbian and Bosnian media.

On 19 December 2013, Mirković, along with Lepa Brena, Severina, Haris Džinović, Aca Lukas and Jelena Karleuša, was a guest at a humanitarian concert by Goran Bregović at the Olympic Hall Juan Antonio Samaranch in the Bosnian capital Sarajevo for the Roma in Bosnia and Herzegovina.

== Personal life ==
During the 1990s Mirković married Serbian politician Zoran Bašanović. The wedding was done secretly in a chapel in Las Vegas and was not legally recognized. Later, after the couple separated, Mirković moved to Vienna, Austria.

In 1999, Mirković married Austrian-Bosnian Croat businessman Toni Bijelić. They have two children together, Marko and Manuela. In 2023, Mirković and her husband, Toni Bijelić, were greeted by actor Jean-Claude Van Damme upon their arrival in Hollywood, CA and were accompanied by Ukrainian actress Marina Mazepa, ahead of her US tour, which commenced in Phoenix, AZ. On 27 March 2024, she announced via press release that she filed documents for divorce from her husband of 24 years and revealed they had not been living together for a few years. She also spoke about her divorce to 24sata and RTV Pink Television where she openly discussed that the process was one of the hardest things in her life emotionally she had to go through.

== Artistry ==
=== Musical style ===
Mirković is known for her ‘oriental' style of folk and turbo folk. Her performance is often sentimental— resulting with songs in which the theme of female suffering in romantic relationships is prominent.

== Legacy ==
Mirković is seen as one of the most popular Serbian folk singers, particularly in the turbo folk genre, as well as being one of the most successful recording artists from the former Yugoslavia. She has received the title "The Madonna or Lady Gaga of Serbia".

== Discography ==
Studio albums

- Imam dečka nemirnog (1984)
- Umiljato oko moje (1985)
- Spasi me samoće (1986)
- Ruže cvetaju samo u pesmama (1987)
- Najlepši par (1988)
- Simpatija (1989)
- Pomisli želju (1990)
- Dobra devojka (1991)
- Dolaze nam bolji dani (1992)
- Do poslednjeg daha (1993)
- Nije tebi do mene (1994)
- Plači zemljo (1995)
- Nema promene (1996)
- Kojom gorom (1997)
- U godini (1999)
- Sama (2000)
- Trag u vremenu (2004)
- Luče moje (2006)
- Eksplozija (2008)
- 20 (2012)
- Od milion jedan (2017)

Other

- Slatko Od Snova (1994)
- Zauvek (2003)

== Tours and concerts ==
=== Tours ===
- Yugoslav Tour (1980)
- Dobra devojka Tour (1992)
- Dragana Tour (1993–2000)
- Od milion jedna Tour (2017–2018)
- USA Tour (2023)
- Do poslednjeg daha Tour (2024)

=== Residency concerts ===
- Dragana Mirković Live at Sava Centar (1995)
- Dragana Mirković Live at Hala Pionir (1998)
