= Farma (Serbian TV series) =

- Also known as: The Farm
- Genre: Reality TV series
- Created by: Željko Mitrović, RTV Pink
- Presented by: Ognjen Amidžić (2009–2016); Dušica Jakovljević (2015–2016); Aleksandra Jeftanović (2009–2015)
- Country of origin: Serbia
- Original language: Serbian
- No. of series: 7

Production
- Running time: Varies per episode
- Production company: RTV Pink

Original release
- Network: RTV Pink (regular seasons 1-7) YouTube (24-hour live stream)
- Release: 20 September 2009 – 29 June 2016

Related
- Zadruga

Farma (Serbian Cyrillic: Фарма, "The Farm") was a Serbian version of the reality TV series The Farm. The show aired in Serbia on RTV Pink, in Montenegro on Pink M and in Bosnia and Herzegovina on Pink BH.

== Season 1 ==
- Start Date: 20 September 2009
- End Date: 23 December 2009
- Duration: 95 days
- The Prize: €100,000
- Main Presenter: Aleksandra Jeftanović & Ognjen Amidžić
- Winner: Milan Topalović "Topalko"
- PEGI Descriptor: Fear/Horror
- PEGI explanation:

=== Contestants ===
Celebrity	Hometown	Famous for... / Occupation	Age
Ana Nikolić	Paraćin, Serbia	Singer	41
Dragana Šarić "Bebi Dol"	Belgrade, Serbia	Singer	57
Svetlana Tanasić "Big Mama"	Belgrade, Serbia	Contestant in Zvezde Granda 4	55
Boško Ničić	Zaječar, Serbia	Mayor of Zaječar	59
Branko Babović	Nikšić, Montenegro	Actor	60
Dragica Radosavljević "Cakana"	Serbia	Singer	62
Slavica Tripunović "Dajana"	Vukovar, Croatia	Miss Yugoslavia 1990 & Singer	49
Maja Nikolić	Niš, Serbia	Singer	44
Marina Perazić	Rijeka, Croatia	Singer & contestant in Farma 2 Croatia	61
Marko Djurovski	Belgrade, Serbia	Singer	36
Igor Lazić "Niggor"	Kotor, Montenegro	Musician	49
Nikola Hadži Nikolić	Belgrade, Serbia	Singer	46
Olja Crnogorac		Model	36
Zoran Radojković "Pile"	Belgrade, Serbia	TV Host	?
Aleksandar Jovanović "Sale"	Belgrade, Serbia	Journalist & Housemate in Veliki Brat VIP1	52
Sandra Obradović	Požarevac, Serbia	Model	30
Saša Ćurčić	Belgrade, Serbia	Ex-Football player & winner of Veliki Brat VIP 1	48
Tanja Djurović	Bosnia and Herzegovina	TV Host	?
Tijana Dapčević	Skopje, Macedonia	Singer & winner of Plesom do snova 1	44
Tomislav Jovanović "Toma"		Musician, Leader of "Blek Panters" band	62
Milan Topalović "Topalko"	Trudovo, Serbia	Contestant in Zvezde Granda 4	43
Snežana Mišković "Viktorija"	Vučitrn, Serbia	Singer	61

=== Nominations ===
	Round 1	Round 2	Round 3	Round 4	Round 5	Round 6	Round 7	Round 8	Round 9	Round 10	Round 11	Round 12	Final		
Farm Leader (Immunity)	Boško	Big Mama	Branko	Marina	Bebi	Maja	Branko	Sale	Cakana	Toma	Viktorija	Marko	None		
Leader Nominations	Big Mama; Toma	Boško; Viktorija	Olja; Topalko	Branko; Maja	Maja; Nigor	Sale; Viktorija	Marina; Marko	Big Mama; Nigor	Branko; Maja	Marina; Topalko	Marko; Sandra	Nigor; Viktorija	None		
Topalko	Toma	Boško	Nominated	Maja	Maja	Viktorija	Marko	Big Mama	Branko	Nominated	Sandra	??	Winner (Day 95)		
Nigor	Toma	Boško	Olja	Maja	Nominated	Sale	Marko	Nominated	Maja	??	Sandra	Nominated	Runner-Up (Day 95)		
Sandra	Not in The Farm			Maja	Maja	Viktorija	Marina	Big Mama	Maja	??	Nominated	??	3rd Place (Day 95)		
Maja	Toma	Boško	Olja	Nominated	Nominated	Viktorija	Marina	Big Mama	Nominated	??	Sandra	??	4th Place (Day 95)		
Viktorija	Toma	Nominated	Olja	Branko	Maja	Nominated	Marko	Big Mama	Maja	??	Marko	Nominated	5th Place (Day 95)		
Marko	Not in The Farm					Sale	Nominated	Big Mama	Maja	??	Nominated	Immune	6th Place (Day 95)		
Cakana	Big Mama	Boško	Olja	Branko	Maja	Sale	Marko	Nigor	Maja	??	Marko	??	Evicted (Day 94)		
Bebi	Not in The Farm			Maja	Maja	Viktorija	Marina	Big Mama	Branko	??	Marko	??	Evicted (Day 93)		
Toma	Nominated	Boško	Olja	Maja	Maja	Viktorija	Marina	Evicted (Day 49)	Maja	??	Sandra	??	Re-Evicted (Day 92)		
Branko	Toma	Boško	Olja	Nominated	Maja	Sale	Marko	Big Mama	Nominated	??	Sandra	??	Evicted (Day 91)		
Sale	Toma	Viktorija	Topalko	Maja	Maja	Nominated	Marina	Big Mama	Branko	??	Sandra	Evicted (Day 84)			
Marina	Toma	Boško	Olja	Maja	Maja	Sale	Nominated	Big Mama	Maja	Nominated	Evicted (Day 77)				
Pile	Toma	Boško	Topalko	Maja	Maja	Evicted (Day 35)			Branko	Re-Evicted (Day 70)					
Big Mama	Nominated	Immune	Olja	Maja	Maja	Sale	Marko	Nominated	Evicted (Day 56)						
Tijana	Not in The Farm					Viktorija	Evicted (Day 42)								
Tanja	Not in The Farm			Maja	Evicted (Day 28)										
Saša	Big Mama	Boško	Olja	Walked (Day 24)											
Nikola	Toma	Boško	Olja	Walked (Day 21)											
Olja	Toma	Boško	Nominated	Evicted (Day 21)											
Boško	Big Mama	Nominated	Evicted (Day 14)												
Dajana	Toma	Evicted (Day 7)													
Ana	Ejected (Day 4)														
Walked	None		Nikola, Saša	None											
Ejected	Ana	None													
1st Nominated (By Group)	Toma; 11/14 votes	Boško; 12/13 votes	Olja; 10/12 votes	Maja; 10/12 votes	Maja; 11/11 votes	Viktorija; 6/12 votes	Marko; 6/11 votes	Big Mama; 9/10 votes	Maja; 7/11 votes	Marina ??/10 votes	Sandra; 6/9 votes	Viktorija ??/7 votes	None		
2nd Nominated (By Public Vote)	Dajana	Maja	Pile	Tanja	Pile	Tijana	Toma	Sandra	Pile	Branko	Sale	Branko	None		
3rd(4th) Nominated (By Punishment or Else)	/	/	/	/	Cakana; Marina	/	Sale	/	/	/	/	/	None		
Evicted	Dajana; 40.55% to save	Boško; 13.92% to save	Olja; 6.42% to save	Tanja; 47.48% to save	Pile; 21.63% to save	Tijana; 12.66% to save	Toma; 9.98% to save	Big Mama; 23.15% to save	Pile; 33.08% to save	Marina; 33.55% to save	Sale; 31.93% to save	Branko; 48.48% to save	Toma; 1.08% to win (Out of 9)	Bebi; 2.35% to win (Out of 8)	Cakana; 3.01% to win (Out of 7)
Evicted	Dajana; 40.55% to save	Boško; 13.92% to save	Olja; 6.42% to save	Tanja; 47.48% to save	Pile; 21.63% to save	Tijana; 12.66% to save	Toma; 9.98% to save	Big Mama; 23.15% to save	Pile; 33.08% to save	Marina; 33.55% to save	Sale; 31.93% to save	Branko; 48.48% to save	Marko; 3.08% to win (Out of 6)	Viktorija; 4.76% to win (Out of 5)	Maja; 5.03% to win (Out of 4)
Evicted	Dajana; 40.55% to save	Boško; 13.92% to save	Olja; 6.42% to save	Tanja; 47.48% to save	Pile; 21.63% to save	Tijana; 12.66% to save	Toma; 9.98% to save	Big Mama; 23.15% to save	Pile; 33.08% to save	Marina; 33.55% to save	Sale; 31.93% to save	Branko; 48.48% to save	Sandra; 6.62% to win (Out of 3)	Nigor; 29.45% to win	Topalko; 70.55% to win

== Season 2 ==
- Start Date: 14 March 2010
- End Date: 26 June 2010
- Duration: 105 days
- The Prize: €100,000
- Main Presenter: Aleksandra Jeftanović & Ognjen Amidžić
- Winner: Miloš Bojanić
- PEGI Descriptor: Bad Language

=== Contestants ===
Celebrity	Hometown	Famous for... / Occupation	Age
Biljana Sečivanović	Schwäbisch Gmünd, Germany	Singer	43
Dejan Stanković "Kralj"		TV Host	37
Dragana Milošević	Belgrade, Serbia	Dancer / Ex-girlfriend of Nemanja	32
Ivan Ivanović "Juice"	Belgrade, Serbia	Rapper	38
Ivan Fece "Firči"	Novi Sad, Serbia	Musician	57
Đogani Gazmen "Gagi"	Belgrade, Serbia	Singer	48
Indira Aradinović "Indy"	Belgrade, Serbia	Singer	33
Irena Ibrahimović		Model	?
Iva Smiljanić		TV Host	30
Ivan Gavrilović	Belgrade, Serbia	Singer	51
Dragan Marinković "Maca"	Sarajevo, Bosnia and Herzegovina	Actor & TV Host	51
Maja Odžaklijevska	Skopje, Macedonia	Singer	65
Marija Šerifović	Kragujevac, Serbia	Singer / Winner of the 2007 Eurovision Song Contest	35
Milena Ćeranić	Kragujevac, Serbia	Singer & Finalist of Zvezde Granda	33
Milica Nastić	Belgrade, Serbia	Model	?
Miloš Bojanić	Bijeljina, Bosnia and Herzegovina	Singer	69
Mina Kostić	Belgrade, Serbia	Singer	44
Mirjana Božović	Lajkovac, Serbia	Model / Miss Serbia 2007	33
Nemanja Stevanović	Velika Moštanica, Serbia	Singer & TV Host / Married to Milena & Ex-boyfriend of Dragana	38
Nikola Sarić "Sajko"	New Belgrade, Serbia	Operacija Trijumf 1 Contestant	31
Radovan "Raka" Radović	Kamenjača, Serbia	Politician	68
Vladimir Stanojević "Vlada"	Trstenik, Serbia	TV Host	38
Zorica Brunclik	Belgrade, Serbia	Singer	64

=== Nominations ===
	Round 1	Round 2	Round 3	Round 4	Round 5	Round 6	Round 7	Round 8	Round 9	Round 10	Round 11	Round 12	Round 13	Round 14	Final		
Farm Leader (Immunity)	Raka	Zorica	Miloš	Miloš	Maca	Firči	Nemanja	Nemanja	Firči	Gagi	Milena	Firči	Sajko	Nemanja	None		
Leader Nominations	Dejan; Irena	Indy (Ejected); Irena; Miloš	Nemanja; Zorica	Firči; Maja	Milena; Sajko	Miloš; Mina	Maca; Dragana	Milena; Vlada	Miloš; Mirjana	Dragana; Miloš	Mina; Nemanja	Dragana; Miloš	Maca; Milena	Dragana; Raka	None		
Miloš	Dejan	Nominated	Nemanja	Maja	Sajko	Nominated	Dragana	Vlada	Nominated	Nominated	Nemanja	Nominated	Maca	Raka	Winner (Day 105)		
Maca	Dejan	Irena	Nemanja	Firči	Milena	Miloš	Nominated	Milena	Mirjana	Miloš	Mina	Miloš	Nominated	Dragana	Runner-Up (Day 105)		
Dragana	Not in The Farm					Mina	Nominated	Vlada	Mirjana	Nominated	Mina	Nominated	Maca	Nominated	3rd Place (Day 105)		
Mina	Not in The Farm					Nominated	Dragana	Milena	Mirjana	Dragana	Nominated	Miloš	Maca	Raka	4th Place (Day 105)		
Firči	Dejan	Irena	Nemanja	Nominated	Milena	Miloš	Dragana	Milena	Mirjana	Miloš	Mina	Miloš	Milena	Dragana	5th Place (Day 105)		
Zorica	Dejan	Irena	Nominated	Firči	Sajko	Miloš	Dragana	Milena	Miloš	Miloš	Mina	Dragana	Milena	Dragana	Evicted (Day 104)		
Nemanja	Dejan	Miloš	Nominated	Maja	Sajko	Miloš	Maca	Milena	Miloš	Miloš	Nominated	Miloš	Maca	Dragana	Evicted (Day 102)		
Raka	Dejan	Miloš	Nemanja	Firči	Milena	Mina	Dragana	Milena	Mirjana	Miloš	Mina	Miloš	Milena	Nominated	Evicted (Day 100)		
Sajko	Dejan	Miloš	Zorica	Maja	Nominated	Evicted (Day 35)		Vlada	Miloš	Miloš	Mina	Miloš	Milena	Dragana	Re-Evicted (Day 98)		
Milena	Dejan	Miloš	Zorica	Maja	Nominated	Miloš	Dragana	Nominated	Miloš	Miloš	Nemanja	Miloš	Nominated	Evicted (Day 91)			
Maja	Dejan	Irena	Nemanja	Nominated	Milena	Miloš	Dragana	Vlada	Miloš	Miloš	Mina	Miloš	Evicted (Day 84)				
Gagi	Dejan	Irena	Nemanja	Maja	Sajko	Mina	Maca	Milena	Miloš	Miloš	Nemanja	Evicted (Day 77)					
Đus	Not in The Farm					Mina	Dragana	Vlada	Miloš	Miloš	Ejected (Day 71)						
Mirjana	Dejan	Irena	Nemanja	Maja	Sajko	Miloš	Dragana	Milena	Nominated	Miloš	Evicted (Day 70)						
Vlada	Not in The Farm			Maja	Milena	Miloš	Dragana	Nominated	Miloš	Evicted (Day 63)							
Ivan	Dejan	Irena	Nemanja	Evicted (Day 21)				Milena	Re-Evicted (Day 56)								
Dejan	Nominated	Irena	Nemanja	Maja	Sajko	Miloš	Maca	Evicted (Day 49)									
Biljana	Not in The Farm			Maja	Sajko	Mina	Evicted (Day 42)										
Milica	Not in The Farm			Maja	Evicted (Day 28)												
Marija	Dejan	Irena	Nemanja	Walked (Day 27)													
Irena	Nominated	Nominated	Evicted (Day 14)														
Indy	Dejan	Nominated	Ejected (Day 13)														
Iva	Dejan	Evicted (Day 7)															
Walked	None		Marija	None													
Ejected	None	Indy	None							Đus	None						
1st Nominated (By Group)	Dejan; 15/15 votes	Irena; 9/13 votes	Nemanja; 10/12 votes	Maja; 10/13 votes	Sajko; 7/12 votes	Miloš; 9/14 votes	Dragana; 10/13 votes	Milena; 9/14 votes	Miloš; 8/13 votes	Miloš; 11/12 votes	Mina; 7/10 votes	Miloš; 8/9 votes	Milena; 4/8 votes	Dragana; 5/7 votes	None		
2nd Nominated (By Public Vote)	Iva	Gagi	Ivan	Milica	Biljana	Biljana	Dejan	Ivan	Vlada	Mirjana	Gagi	Maja	Raka	Sajko	None		
3rd(4th) Nominated (By Punishment or Else)	/	/	/	/	/	/	Milena	/	/	/	/	/	/	/	None		
Evicted	Iva; 19% to save	Irena; 32.42% to save	Ivan; 31.71% to save	Milica; 18.90% to save	Sajko; 31.16% to save	Biljana; 48.87% to save	Dejan; 5.85% to save	Ivan; 41.47% to save	Vlada; 23.25% to save	Mirjana; 40.82% to save	Gagi; 2.63% to save	Maja; 10.96% to save	Milena; 38.51% to save	Sajko; 17.57% to save	Raka; 0.55% to win (Out of 8)	Nemanja; 2.11% to win (Out of 7)	Zorica; 3.03% to win (Out of 6)
Evicted	Iva; 19% to save	Irena; 32.42% to save	Ivan; 31.71% to save	Milica; 18.90% to save	Sajko; 31.16% to save	Biljana; 48.87% to save	Dejan; 5.85% to save	Ivan; 41.47% to save	Vlada; 23.25% to save	Mirjana; 40.82% to save	Gagi; 2.63% to save	Maja; 10.96% to save	Milena; 38.51% to save	Sajko; 17.57% to save	Firči; 6.08% to win (Out of 5)	Mina; 7.61% to win (Out of 4)	Dragana; 14.83% to win (Out of 3)
Evicted	Iva; 19% to save	Irena; 32.42% to save	Ivan; 31.71% to save	Milica; 18.90% to save	Sajko; 31.16% to save	Biljana; 48.87% to save	Dejan; 5.85% to save	Ivan; 41.47% to save	Vlada; 23.25% to save	Mirjana; 40.82% to save	Gagi; 2.63% to save	Maja; 10.96% to save	Milena; 38.51% to save	Sajko; 17.57% to save	Maca; 26.11% to win	Miloš; 39.68% to win	

== Season 3 ==
- Start Date: 12 September 2010
- End Date: 30 December 2010
- Duration: 109 days
- The Prize: €100,000
- Main Presenter: Aleksandra Jeftanović & Ognjen Amidžić
- Winner: Katarina Zivković
- PEGI Descriptor: Violence/Gore

=== Contestants ===
Celebrity	Hometown	Famous for... / Occupation	Age
Snežana Jovanović "Šikica"	Belgrade, Serbia	Singer	60
Zoran Pejić, "Peja"		TV Host	55
Eva Ras	Subotica, Serbia	Actress	79
Katarina Zivkovic		Politician	62
Natalija Trik FX		Singer, Dancer	48
Ekrem Jevrić	Plav, Montenegro, Serbia	Singer, YouTube star	died
Borko Vujičić "Bore"	Belgrade, Serbia	Rapper	35
Sanja Radinović	Belegiš, Serbia	Model	?
Andrija Djogani "Baki B3"	Zemun, Serbia	Singer	48
Zlata Petrović	Belgrade, Serbia	Singer	57
Branislav Janković "Bane"	Belgrade, Serbia	Model	?
Bratislav Zdravković "Bata"	Belgrade, Serbia	Singer	47
Stefan Gligorijević "Zuluf"	Belgrade, Serbia	Rapper	34
Jelena Stožinić	Serbia	Model	31
Jasmina Ana	Raška, Serbia	Writer	?
Irena Šućur	Doboj, Bosnia and Herzegovina	Model	31
Slobodan Batjarević "Cobe"	Leskovac, Serbia	Singer, Contestant of Zvezde Granda 2007	38
Nikola Kostić "Limeni"		Musician	52
Renato Henc	Požarevac, Serbia	Singer, Contestant of Zvezde Granda 2007	47
Milan Paroški		Politician	63
Katarina "Kaća" Živković	Leskovac, Serbia	Singer, Contestant of Zvezde Granda 2007	30
Tina Ivanović	Kosovska Kamenica, Serbia	Singer	45
Hasan Dudić		Singer	62
Sanja Stojanović	Smederevska Palanka, Serbia	Singer, Contestant of Zvezde Granda 2007	33
Aleksandar Ilić "Aca"		Singer	58
Bojan Jovanovski "Boki 13"	Skopje, Macedonia	Singer and Television Personality	33
Vesna Vukelić Vendi	Belgrade, Serbia	Singer, glamour model and reality TV star	48
Zorana Pavić	Belgrade, Serbia	Singer	54
Jovana Pajić	Belgrade, Serbia	Singer	31
Čedomir Rajačić "Čeda Čvorak"	Šabac, Serbia	Singer and composer	59

=== Nominations ===
	Round 1	Round 2	Round 3	Round 4	Round 5	Round 6	Round 7	Round 8	Round 9	Round 10	Round 11	Round 12	Round 13	Round 14	Round 15	Final		
Farm Leader (Immunity)	Milan	Bane	Peja	Marijan	Eva	Ekrem	Vendi	Stefan	Jelena	Jovana	Kaća	Peja	Bane	Marijan	Baki B3	None		
Leader Nominations	Zorana; Baki B3	Sanja S. Milan	Zlata; Bane	Jasmina; Milan (Ejected)	Jelena; Bane	Kaća; Limeni	Zorana; Peja	Zlata; Ekrem	Zorana; Peja	Vendi; Marijan	Natalija; Bata	Kaća; Stefan	Jovana; Limeni	Vendi; Ekrem	Eva; Bane	None		
Kaća	Zorana	Banned	??	??	Jelena	Nominated	Evicted (Day 42)	??	Peja	??	Bata	Nominated	??	??	??	Winner (Day 109)		
Marijan	Zorana	Milan	??	??	Jelena	Kaća	??	??	Peja	Nominated	Natalija	??	??	??	Eva	Runner-Up (Day 109)		
Ekrem	Baki B3	Sanja S.	??	??	Jelena	Kaća	??	Nominated	Peja	??	Bata	??	Jovana	Nominated	??	3rd Place (Day 109)		
Zorana	Nominated	Sanja S.	??	??	Bane	Kaća	Nominated	??	Nominated	??	Natalija	??	Limeni	??	??	4th Place (Day 109)		
Jovana	Baki B3	Milan	??	??	Bane	Kaća	??	??	Zorana	??	Natalija	??	Nominated	??	??	5th Place (Day 109)		
Bane	Zorana	Milan	Nominated	??	Nominated	Limeni	??	??	Peja	??	Bata	??	Limeni	??	Nominated	6th Place (Day 109)		
Vendi	Not in The Farm			/	Bane	Limeni	Zorana	??	Zorana	Nominated	Natalija	??	Jovana	Nominated	??	Evicted (Day 108)		
Bata	Zorana	Sanja S.	??	??	Jelena	Kaća	??	??	Peja	??	Nominated	??	??	??	??	Evicted (Day 108)		
Peja	Zorana	Milan	??	??	Bane	Kaća	Nominated	??	Nominated	??	Bata	??	Jovana	??	Bane	Evicted (Day 107)		
Baki B3	Nominated	Milan	??	??	Bane	Kaća	??	??	Peja	??	Bata	??	Jovana	??	??	Evicted (Day 107)		
Jasmina	Baki B3	Sanja S.	??	Nominated	Bane	Limeni	??	??	Peja	??	Natalija	??	??	??	??	Evicted (Day 106)		
Limeni	Baki B3	Sanja S.	??	??	Jelena	Nominated	??	??	Zorana	??	Natalija	Aki	Nominated	??	??	Evicted (Day 106)		
Eva	Zorana	Sanja S.	??	??	Bane	Limeni	??	??	Peja	??	Bata	??	Limeni	??	Nominated	Evicted (Day 105)		
Natalija	Zorana	Milan	??	??	Bane	Kaća	??	??	Peja	??	Nominated	??	Limeni	??	Evicted (Day 98)			
Aca	Baki B3	Sanja S.	??	??	Bane	Kaća	??	??	Zorana	??	Natalija	??	Jovana	Evicted (Day 91)				
Boki 13	Not in The Farm								Zorana	??	Bata	??	??	Walked (Day 91)				
Stefan	Not in The Farm						/	??	Peja	??	Bata	Nominated	Evicted (Day 85)					
Jelena	Baki B3	Milan	??	??	Nominated	Kaća	??	??	Peja	??	Bata	??	Evicted (Day 84)					
Zlata	Zorana	Milan	Nominated	??	Jelena	Kaća	??	Nominated	Zorana	??	Natalija	Evicted (Day 77)						
Cobe	Zorana	Milan	??	??	Jelena	Limeni	??	??	Peja	??	Evicted (Day 70)							
Sanja S.	Zorana	Nominated	??	??	Bane	Kaća	??	??	Peja	Evicted (Day 63)								
Irena	Not in The Farm						/	??	Evicted (Day 56)									
Borko	Not in The Farm						/	Evicted (Day 49)										
Tina	Baki B3	Milan	??	??	Bane	Walked (Day 35)												
Čeda	Not in The Farm			/	Jelena	Evicted (Day 35)												
Renato	Baki B3	Milan	??	??	Evicted (Day 28)													
Milan	Baki B3	Nominated	??	Nominated	Ejected (Day 23)													
Hasan	Zorana	Milan	??	Evicted (Day 21)														
Šikica	Baki B3	Sanja S.	Evicted (Day 14)															
Sanja R.	Baki B3	Evicted (Day 7)																
Walked	None				Tina	None							Boki 13	None				
Ejected	None			Milan	None			None						None				
1st Nominated (By Group)	Baki B3; 11/22 votes	Milan; 12/20 votes	Zlata ?/20 votes	Jasmina ?/19 votes	Bane; 11/19 votes	Kaća; 12/17 votes	None	Ekrem ?/19 votes	Peja ?/17 votes	Vendi ?/15 votes	Bata ?/14 votes	Stefan ?/13 votes	Jovana; 8/14 votes	Ekrem ?/13 votes	Eva ?/12 votes	None		
2nd Nominated (By Public Vote)	Sanja R.	Šikica	Hasan	Renato	Čeda	Jovana	Borko	Irena	Sanja S.	Cobe	Zlata	Jelena	Aca	Natalija	Peja	None		
3rd(4th) Nominated (By Punishment or Else)	/	Kaća	Peja	/	/	/	Zorana; Peja	Limeni; Bane	/	/	/	/	/	/	/	None		
Votes x2 (Knowledge Test or Game)	Baki B3	Milan	Hasan	Jasmina	Bane	Jovana	Borko	Bane	Peja	Vendi	Bata	Stefan	Jovana	Natalija	Eva	None		
Evicted	Sanja R. 17.38% to save	Šikica; 23.31% to save	Hasan; 22.02% to save	Renato; 43.30% to save	Čeda; 12.30% to save	Kaća; 30.42% to save	Borko; 16.49% to save	Irena; 5.42% to save	Sanja S. 4.22% to save	Cobe; 17.88% to save	Zlata; 27.98% to save	Jelena; 15.76% to save	Aca; 13.88% to save	Natalija; 46.89% to save	Eva; 19.75% to save	Limeni; 0.55% to win (Out of 12)	Jasmina; 1.37% to win (Out of 11)	Baki B3; 2.55% to win (Out of 10)
Evicted	Sanja R. 17.38% to save	Šikica; 23.31% to save	Hasan; 22.02% to save	Renato; 43.30% to save	Čeda; 12.30% to save	Kaća; 30.42% to save	Borko; 16.49% to save	Irena; 5.42% to save	Sanja S. 4.22% to save	Cobe; 17.88% to save	Zlata; 27.98% to save	Jelena; 15.76% to save	Aca; 13.88% to save	Natalija; 46.89% to save	Eva; 19.75% to save	Peja; 3.99% to win (Out of 9)	Bata; 5.19% to win (Out of 8)	Vendi; 6.05% to win (Out of 7)
Evicted	Sanja R. 17.38% to save	Šikica; 23.31% to save	Hasan; 22.02% to save	Renato; 43.30% to save	Čeda; 12.30% to save	Kaća; 30.42% to save	Borko; 16.49% to save	Irena; 5.42% to save	Sanja S. 4.22% to save	Cobe; 17.88% to save	Zlata; 27.98% to save	Jelena; 15.76% to save	Aca; 13.88% to save	Natalija; 46.89% to save	Eva; 19.75% to save	Bane; 6.33% to win (Out of 6)	Jovana; 16.16% to win (Out of 5)	Zorana; 21.65% to win (Out of 4)
Evicted	Sanja R. 17.38% to save	Šikica; 23.31% to save	Hasan; 22.02% to save	Renato; 43.30% to save	Čeda; 12.30% to save	Kaća; 30.42% to save	Borko; 16.49% to save	Irena; 5.42% to save	Sanja S. 4.22% to save	Cobe; 17.88% to save	Zlata; 27.98% to save	Jelena; 15.76% to save	Aca; 13.88% to save	Natalija; 46.89% to save	Eva; 19.75% to save	Ekrem; 29.70% to win (Out of 3)	Marijan; 45.33% to win	Kaća; 54.67% to win

== Season 4 ==
- Start Date: 19 March 2013
- End Date: 7 July 2013
- Duration: 110 days
- The Prize: €50,000
- Main Presenter: Aleksandra Jeftanović & Ognjen Amidžić
- Winner: Sulejman Haljevac "Memo"
- PEGI Descriptor: Sex/Nudity

=== Contestants ===
Celebrity	Hometown	Famous for... / Occupation	Age
Duško Bogdanović	Galibabinac, Serbia	Contestant of Big Brother	57
Radojka Bogdanović	Galibabinac, Serbia	Wife of the contestant of Big Brother	49
Sulejman Haljevac "Memo"	Sarajevo, Bosnia and Herzegovina	Painter	31
Marija Petronijević	Požega, Serbia	Actress	26
Amel Ćeman "Ćemo"	Berane, Montenegro	Singer	33
Dragana Šarić "Bebi Dol"	Belgrade, Serbia	Singer	51
Andrija Marković "Aki"	Požarevac, Serbia	Singer	20
Daria Stanojević	Priboj, Serbia	Singer	28
Danijel Alibabić	Podgorica, Montenegro	Singer	25
Sandra Valteroviċ "Sexy Sandra"	Beograd, Serbia	Singer	25
Filip Mitrović	Kraljevo, Serbia	Singer / Contestant of The First Voice of Serbia	22
Gordana Bjelica	Obrenovac, Serbia	Actress	54
Filip Panajotović	Pančevo, Serbia	Model	24
Savka Gazivoda "Saška Karan"	Vukovar, Croatia	Singer	49
Andrija "Era" Ojdanić	Visoka Arilje, Serbia	Singer	66
Ljuba Pantović	Beograd, Serbia	Professional athlete	34
Milan Obradović "Miki Meċava"	Prokuplje, Serbia	Singer	51
Gordana "Goca" Božinovska	Samaila Kraljevo, Serbia	Singer	49
Milan Radonjić "Milan Tarot"	Beograd, Serbia	Magician	40
Vesna Rivas	Beograd, Serbia	Singer	48
Nazif Gljiva	Bosnia and Herzegovina	Composer	64
Zorica Marković	Kosjerić, Serbia	Singer	54
Zoran Jagodić "Rule"	Serbia	Musician	45
Jovana Nikolić	Niš, Serbia	Model	25
Nenad Aleksić "Sha"	Beograd, Serbia	Rapper	33
Tijana Macura	Serbia	Actress, singer	34
Ekrem Jevrić	Plav, Montenegro, Serbia	Singer, YouTube star	52
Stanija Dobrojević	Virovitica, Croatia	Starlet	28

=== Nominations ===
	Round 1	Round 2	Round 3	Round 4	Round 5	Round 6	Round 7	Round 8	Round 9	Round 10	Round 11	Round 12	Round 13	Round 14	Round 15	Final		
Farm Leader (Immunity)	Ekrem	Miki	Era	Ljuba	Zorica	Danijel	Miki	Goca	Ekrem	Radojka	Saška	Stanija	Era	Aki	Saška	None		
Leader Nominations	Radojka; Duško	Gordana; Danijel	Stanija; Aki	Vesna; Milan	Ljuba; Sha	Zorica; Ekrem	Vesna; Ekrem	Vesna; Memo	Jovana; Danijel	Saška; Era	Radojka; Filip P.	Ljuba; Aki	Saška; Milan	Stanija; Filip P.	Stanija; Memo	None		
Memo	Not in The Farm				/	Zorica	Vesna	Nominated	Jovana	Saška	Radojka	Aki	Milan	Stanija	Nominated	Winner (Day 110)		
Stanija	Duško	Gordana	Nominated	Vesna	Ljuba	Ekrem	Vesna	Vesna	Jovana	Saška	Radojka	Aki	Saška	Nominated	Nominated	Runner-Up (Day 110)		
Radojka	Nominated	Danijel	Aki	Milan	Ljuba	Zorica	Ekrem	Vesna	Danijel	Saška	Nominated	Aki	Milan	Stanija	Memo	3rd Place (Day 110)		
Goca	Duško	Danijel	Stanija	Vesna	Ljuba	Ekrem	Vesna	Vesna	Jovana	Saška	Filip P.	Aki	Saška	Filip P.	Stanija	4th Place (Day 110)		
Aki	Duško	Gordana	Nominated	Vesna	Ljuba	Zorica	Vesna	Vesna	Danijel	Era	Filip P.	Nominated	Saška	Stanija	Stanija	5th Place (Day 110)		
Sha	Duško	Gordana	Stanija	Vesna	Nominated	Zorica	Vesna	Vesna	Danijel	Saška	Filip P.	Ljuba	Saška	Stanija	Stanija	6th Place (Day 110)		
Filip P.	Duško	Gordana	Aki	Vesna	Ljuba	Zorica	Vesna	Vesna	Jovana	Saška	Nominated	Evicted (Day 75)	/	Nominated	Memo	Re-Evicted (Day 109)		
Ekrem	Radojka	Danijel	Stanija	Milan	Ljuba	Nominated	Nominated	Vesna	Danijel	Saška	Radojka	Aki	Saška	Filip P.	Stanija	Evicted (Day 109)		
Danijel	Duško	Nominated	Stanija	Milan	Sha	Ekrem	Vesna	Vesna	Nominated	Saška	Radojka	Aki	Milan	Filip P.	Stanija	Evicted (Day 108)		
Ljuba	Duško	Gordana	Stanija	Vesna	Nominated	Zorica	Vesna	Vesna	Jovana	Saška	Filip P.	Nominated	Milan	Filip P.	Stanija	Evicted (Day 107)		
Vesna	Duško	Gordana	Aki	Nominated	Ljuba	Ekrem	Nominated	Nominated	Danijel	Era	Filip P.	Aki	Milan	Stanija	Memo	Evicted (Day 106)		
Jovana	Duško	Danijel	Stanija	Milan	Ljuba	Ekrem	Vesna	Memo	Nominated	/	Radojka	Aki	Saška	Stanija	Stanija	Evicted (Day 105)		
Saška	Duško	Gordana	Stanija	Vesna	Sha	Ekrem	Ekrem	Memo	Danijel	Nominated	Filip P.	Aki	Nominated	Filip P.	Stanija	Evicted (Day 104)		
Era	Radojka	Gordana	Stanija	Milan	Sha	Walked (Day 34)		Memo	Danijel	Nominated	Radojka	Aki	Saška	Filip P.	Stanija	Evicted (Day 103)		
Milan	Radojka	Danijel	Aki	Nominated	/	Ekrem	Vesna	Vesna	Jovana	Era	Radojka	Ljuba	Nominated	Stanija	Evicted (Day 96)			
Filip M.	Duško	Gordana	Stanija	Vesna	Sha	Zorica	Vesna	Vesna	Danijel	Era	Filip P.	Ljuba	Saška	Evicted (Day 89)				
Miki	Duško	Gordana	Aki	Milan	Sha	Ekrem	Vesna	Vesna	Danijel	Saška	Filip P.	Aki	Evicted (Day 82)					
Bebi	Not in The Farm							Vesna	Danijel	Era	Evicted (Day 68)							
Duško	Nominated	Danijel	Aki	Vesna	Sha	Zorica	Ekrem	Vesna	Danijel	Evicted (Day 61)								
Zorica	Duško	Danijel	Stanija	Vesna	Ljuba	Nominated	Ekrem	Memo	Ejected (Day 59)									
Gordana	Duško	Nominated	Stanija	Vesna	Sha	Zorica	Evicted (Day 40)	Vesna	Re-Evicted (Day 54)									
Marija	Not in The Farm				/	Zorica	/	Evicted (Day 47)										
Ćemo	Not in The Farm					/	/	Walked (Day 47)										
Sandra	Duško	Gordana	Stanija	Vesna	Ljuba	Evicted (Day 33)												
Daria	Duško	Danijel	Stanija	Milan	Evicted (Day 26)													
Nazif	Duško	Gordana	Aki	Evicted (Day 19)														
Rule	Duško	Gordana	Evicted (Day 12)															
Tijana	Duško	Evicted (Day 5)																
Walked	None				Era	None	Ćemo	None										
Ejected	None								Zorica	None			Vesna; Goca	None				
1st Nominated (By Group)	Duško; 19/22 votes	Gordana; 13/21 votes	Stanija; 13/20 votes	Vesna; 12/19 votes	Ljuba; 10/17 votes	Zorica; 10/18 votes	Vesna; 12/16 votes	Vesna; 15/19 votes	Danijel; 11/17 votes	Saška; 10/15 votes	Filip P. 8/15 votes	Aki; 11/14 votes	Saška; 8/13 votes	Stanija; 7/13 votes	Stanija; 9/12 votes	None		
2nd Nominated (By Public Vote)	Tijana	Rule	Nazif	Daria	Sandra	Gordana	Radojka	Gordana	Duško	Bebi	Filip M.	Miki	Filip M.	Era	Era	None		
3rd(4th) Nominated (By Punishment or Else)	/	/	/	/	Milan	Jovana	Marija; Filip M.	/	/	Jovana	/	Stanija; Filip P.	Filip P.	Filip P. Milan	/	None		
Votes x2 (Knowledge Test or Game)	Tijana	Gordana	Stanija	Daria	Ljuba	Jovana	Vesna	Vesna	Danijel	Jovana	Filip M.	Stanija	Filip P.	Stanija	Stanija	None		
Evicted	Tijana; 17.88% to save	Rule; 17.36% to save	Nazif; 13.78% to save	Daria; 47.53% to save	Sandra; 5.86% to save	Gordana; 17.48% to save	Marija; 15.71% to save	Gordana; 19.15% to save	Duško; 37.73% to save	Bebi; 13.95% to save	Filip P. 45.21% to save	Miki; 13.51% to save	Filip M. 11.06% to save	Milan; 2.18% to save	Era; 20.78% to save	Saška; 0.42% to win (Out of 13)	Jovana; 1.03% to win (Out of 12)	Vesna; 1.28% to win (Out of 11)
Evicted	Tijana; 17.88% to save	Rule; 17.36% to save	Nazif; 13.78% to save	Daria; 47.53% to save	Sandra; 5.86% to save	Gordana; 17.48% to save	Marija; 15.71% to save	Gordana; 19.15% to save	Duško; 37.73% to save	Bebi; 13.95% to save	Filip P. 45.21% to save	Miki; 13.51% to save	Filip M. 11.06% to save	Milan; 2.18% to save	Era; 20.78% to save	Ljuba; 2.85% to win (Out of 10)	Danijel; 3.32% to win (Out of 9)	Ekrem; 4.98% to win (Out of 8)
Evicted	Tijana; 17.88% to save	Rule; 17.36% to save	Nazif; 13.78% to save	Daria; 47.53% to save	Sandra; 5.86% to save	Gordana; 17.48% to save	Marija; 15.71% to save	Gordana; 19.15% to save	Duško; 37.73% to save	Bebi; 13.95% to save	Filip P. 45.21% to save	Miki; 13.51% to save	Filip M. 11.06% to save	Milan; 2.18% to save	Era; 20.78% to save	Filip P. 5.13% to win (Out of 7)	Sha; 5.25% to win (Out of 6)	Aki; 11.26% to win (Out of 5)
Evicted	Tijana; 17.88% to save	Rule; 17.36% to save	Nazif; 13.78% to save	Daria; 47.53% to save	Sandra; 5.86% to save	Gordana; 17.48% to save	Marija; 15.71% to save	Gordana; 19.15% to save	Duško; 37.73% to save	Bebi; 13.95% to save	Filip P. 45.21% to save	Miki; 13.51% to save	Filip M. 11.06% to save	Milan; 2.18% to save	Era; 20.78% to save	Goca; 16.78% to win (Out of 4)	Radojka; 22.85% to win (Out of 3)	Stanija; 38.65% to win
Evicted	Tijana; 17.88% to save	Rule; 17.36% to save	Nazif; 13.78% to save	Daria; 47.53% to save	Sandra; 5.86% to save	Gordana; 17.48% to save	Marija; 15.71% to save	Gordana; 19.15% to save	Duško; 37.73% to save	Bebi; 13.95% to save	Filip P. 45.21% to save	Miki; 13.51% to save	Filip M. 11.06% to save	Milan; 2.18% to save	Era; 20.78% to save	Memo; 61.35% to win		

== Season 5 ==
- Start Date: 1 September 2013
- End Date: 30 December 2013
- Duration: 120 days
- The Prize: €50,000
- Main Presenter: Aleksandra Jeftanović & Ognjen Amidžić
- Winner: Jelena Golubović
- PEGI Descriptor: Discrimination

=== Contestants ===
Celebrity	Hometown	Famous for... / Occupation	Age	Entered	Exited
Milica Ostojić "Mica Trofrtaljka"	Niš, Serbia	Singer/Actress	70		
Nela Bijanić	Smederevo, Serbia	Singer	43	Day 1	Day 7
Anastasija Buđić	Požarevac, Serbia	Model/Singer, Contestant on Big Brother VIP1	20		
Vanja Mijatović	Kraljevo, Serbia	Singer, Contestant on Zvezde Granda 6	27		
Dragan Krstić "Crni"	Novi Sad, Serbia	Singer	47		
Zumreta Midžić "Zuzi Zu"	Velika Kladuša, Bosnia & Herzegovina	Singer	52		
Andrija "Aki" Marković	Požarevac, Serbia	Singer	21		
Miroslav "Miki" Đuričić	Kupinovo, Serbia	TV Host/Contestant of Big Brother 1,2 and VIP 3	36		
Marko Munjiza "Marko Vanilla"	Rijeka, Croatia	Disk Jockey/Singer	29		
Igor Starović	Belgrade, Serbia	Singer	43		
Hristijan Todorovski	Skopje, Macedonia	Singer	23		
Divna Karleuša	Belgrade, Serbia	Journalist, radio personality, mother of Jelena Karleuša	52		
Aleksandra Stojković "Džidža"	Belgrade, Serbia	Singer, Contestant of Zvezde Granda 7	25		
Svetlana Koprivica "Miss Svetlana"	Belgrade, Serbia	Singer/Actress/TV Personality	49		
Miroslav Pržulj "Lepi Mića"	Sarajevo, Bosnia & Herzegovina	Singer	43		
Danimir Vajs "W-ice"	Serbia	Rapper	42		
Sara Trajanović	Beograd, Serbia	Model	22		
Muhedin Kalač "Čupo"	Gothenburg, Sweden	Singer	43		
Katarina Grujić	Belgrade, Serbia	Singer, Contestant of Zvezde Granda 7	21		
Zorica Marković	Kosjerić, Serbia	Singer	54		
Boris Stamenković	Belgrade, Serbia	Model	25		
Ivan Marinković	Belgrade, Serbia	Ex Husband Of Goca Tržan	35		
Slobodan Đurković	Brus, Serbia	Singer, Contestant of Zvezde Granda 7	25		
Jelena Jovanović	Belgrade, Serbia	Singer/Actress, Contestant on Zvezde Granda 4	23		
Suzana Perović	Belgrade, Serbia	Singer/TV Personality	51		
Edin Škorić	Belgrade, Serbia	Volleyball player, Contestant on Survivor VIP	37		
Simonida Aćević	Belgrade, Serbia	Singer, YouTube star	43		
Romana Panić	Banja Luka, Bosnia & Herzegovina	Singer	38		
Marko Vukotić	Cetinje, Montenegro	Model	28		
Jelena Golubović	Belgrade, Serbia	Actress/Director	33	Day 1	Day 120
Šeki Turković	Krnja Jela, Serbia	Singer	59		
Marijana Leontijević	Obrenovac, Serbia	Model, Balerina	21		
Aleksandar Marinković "Japa"	Smederevo, Serbia	Singer	41		
Jezdimir Vasiljević "Gazda Jezda"	Beograd, Serbia	Businessman	57		
Ekrem Jevrić	Plav, Montenegro, Serbia	Singer, YouTube star	52		

=== Nominations ===
	Round 1	Round 2	Round 3	Round 4	Round 5	Round 6	Round 7	Round 8	Round 9	Round 10	Round 11	Round 12	Round 13	Round 14	Round 15	Round 16	Final		
Farm Leader (Immunity)	Mica	Zorica	Jelena J.	Marko	Divna	Jelena G.	Mića	Ekrem	Katarina	Suzana	Ivan	Romana	Marko	Ekrem	Katarina	Sara	None		
Leader's Servants	Nela; Vajs	Sara; Ivan	Jelena G. Edin	Sara; Mića	Katarina; Šeki	Divna; Igor	Marijana; Slobodan	Simonida; Boris	Divna; Ekrem							Jelena G. Ivan	None		
Jelena G.	Nela	Sara	Nominated	Sara	Banned	Divna	Slobodan	Boris								Nominated	Winner (Day 120)		
Slobodan	Nela	Ivan	Jelena G.	Sara	Šeki	Divna	Nominated	Simonida								Jelena G.	Runner-Up (Day 120)		
Edin	Nela	Sara	Nominated	Sara	Katarina	Divna	Slobodan	Simonida								Jelena G.	3rd place (Day 120)		
Jelena J.	Nela	Ivan	Jelena G.	Sara	Šeki	Divna	Slobodan	Simonida								Jelena G.	4th place (Day 120)		
Romana	Vajs	Ivan	Edin	Sara	Šeki	Igor	Marijana	Boris								Ivan	5th place (Day 120)		
Ivan	Vajs	Nominated	Jelena G.	Mića	Šeki	Divna	Marijana	Simonida								Nominated	6th place (Day 120)		
Marko	Nela	Sara	Jelena G.	Sara	Šeki	Divna	Marijana	Simonida								Ivan	Evicted (Day 119)		
Katarina	Nela	Ivan	Jelena G.	Sara	Nominated	Divna	Slobodan	Simonida				Nominated				Jelena G.	Evicted (Day 119)		
Ekrem	Not in The Farm				/	Igor	Marijana	Boris	Nominated			Nominated				Ivan	Evicted (Day 119)		
Marijana	Not in The Farm				/	Divna	Nominated	Boris								Ivan	Evicted (Day 117)		
Zorica	Vajs	Sara	Edin	Sara	Katarina	Divna	Marijana	Simonida								Ivan	Evicted (Day 117)		
Sara	Nela	Nominated	Jelena G.	Nominated	Šeki	Divna	Banned	Boris								Jelena G.	Evicted (Day 113)		
Vajs	Nominated	Ivan	Jelena G.	Mića	Šeki	Divna	Slobodan	Simonida								Jelena G.	Evicted (Day 112)		
Simonida	Nela	Ivan	Jelena G.	Mića	Šeki	Divna	Slobodan	Nominated								Evicted (Day 106)			
Suzana	Nela	Ivan	Jelena G.	Mića	Šeki	Igor	Slobodan	Simonida								Evicted (Day 105)			
Boris	Vajs	Ivan	Jelena G.	Sara	Šeki	Divna	Marijana	Nominated							Evicted (Day 98)				
Šeki	Not in The Farm	/	Jelena G.	Sara	Nominated	Divna	Slobodan	Simonida						Evicted (Day 91)					
Japa	Not in The Farm						/	/		Nominated			Evicted (Day 84)						
Mića	Vajs	Sara	Jelena G.	Nominated	Šeki	Divna	Slobodan	Simonida					Ejected (Day 80)						
Miss Svetlana	Nela	Ivan	Jelena G.	Sara	Šeki	Igor	Marijana	Boris		Nominated		Evicted (Day 77)							
Džidža	Nela	Ivan	Jelena G.	Sara	Šeki	Divna	Marijana	Boris	Nominated		Evicted (Day 70)								
Divna	Nela	Ivan	Jelena G.	Mića	Šeki	Nominated	Slobodan	Simonida		Evicted (Day 63)									
Hristijan	Not in The Farm					/	Marijana	Simonida	Evicted (Day 56)										
Čupo	Vajs	Ivan	Edin	Sara	Katarina	Igor	Marijana	Evicted (Day 49)											
Igor	Nela	Sara	Jelena G.	Sara	Šeki	Nominated	Walked (Day 47)												
Marko Vanilla	Nela	Ivan	Jelena G.	Sara	Šeki	Divna	Evicted (Day 42)												
Gazda Jezda	Not in The Farm				/	/	Walked (Day 42)												
Miki	Nela	Banned	Jelena G.	Sara	Šeki	Walked (Day 41)													
Zuzi Zu	Nela	Ivan	Jelena G.	Sara	Šeki	Evicted (Day 35)													
Aki	Not in The Farm			/	Šeki	Evicted (Day 35)													
Crni	Vajs	Ivan	Jelena G.	Mića	Evicted (Day 28)														
Vanja	Not in The Farm	/	Jelena G.	Evicted (Day 21)															
Anastasija	Nela	Ivan	Evicted (Day 14)																
Nela	Nominated	Evicted (Day 7)																	
Mica	Nela	Walked (Day 7)																	
Walked	Mica	None																	
Ejected	None										Mića	None							
1st Nominated (By Group)	Nela; 17/25 votes	Ivan; 16/22 votes	Jelena G. 21/24 votes	Sara. 17/23 votes	Šeki /21 votes	Divna /21 votes	Slobodan	Simonida /19 votes	Ekrem /18 votes	Japa /17 votes	Marko /16 votes	Ivan /15 votes	Ekrem /14 votes	Edin /13 votes	Marijana /12 votes	Jelena G. 6/11 votes	None		
2nd Nominated (By Public Vote)	Marko Vanilla	Anastasija	Vanja	Crni	Zuzi Zu	Marko Vanilla	Čupo	Hristijan	Miss Svetlana	Džidža	Miss Svetlana	Japa	Šeki	Boris	Suzana	Vajs	None		
3rd(4th) Nominated (By Punishment or Else)	/	Miki	/	/	Jelena G.		Sara		Divna	/	/	Jelena J./Edin	/	/	/	/	None		
Votes x2 (Knowledge Test or Game)	Nela	Anastasija	Vanja	Sara	Zuzi Zu	Marko Vanilla		Hristijan	Miss Svetlana	/	/	/	Šeki	Boris	Marijana	Jelena G.	None		
Evicted	Nela; 22.33% to save	Anastasija; 24.67% to save	Vanja; 29.27% to save	Crni; 18.82% to save	Zuzi Zu; 7.33% to save	Marko Vanilla; 45.09% to save	Čupo; 16.20% to save	Hristijan; 46.24% to save	Divna; 11.85% to save	Džidža; 46% to save	Miss Svetlana; 3% to save	Japa; 22.95% to save	Šeki; 46.59% to save	Boris; 48.23% to save	Suzana; 10.52% to save	Vajs; 6.43% to save	Sara; 1.30% to win(Out of 12)	Zorica; 1.83% to win(Out of 11)	Marijana; 3.84% to win(Out of 10)
Evicted	Nela; 22.33% to save	Anastasija; 24.67% to save	Vanja; 29.27% to save	Crni; 18.82% to save	Zuzi Zu; 7.33% to save	Marko Vanilla; 45.09% to save	Čupo; 16.20% to save	Hristijan; 46.24% to save	Divna; 11.85% to save	Džidža; 46% to save	Miss Svetlana; 3% to save	Japa; 22.95% to save	Šeki; 46.59% to save	Boris; 48.23% to save	Suzana; 10.52% to save	Vajs; 6.43% to save	Ekrem; 4.98% to win(Out of 9)	Katarina; 5.68% to win(Out of 8)	Marko; 6.52% to win(Out of 7)
Evicted	Nela; 22.33% to save	Anastasija; 24.67% to save	Vanja; 29.27% to save	Crni; 18.82% to save	Zuzi Zu; 7.33% to save	Marko Vanilla; 45.09% to save	Čupo; 16.20% to save	Hristijan; 46.24% to save	Divna; 11.85% to save	Džidža; 46% to save	Miss Svetlana; 3% to save	Japa; 22.95% to save	Šeki; 46.59% to save	Boris; 48.23% to save	Suzana; 10.52% to save	Vajs; 6.43% to save	Ivan; 7.77% to win (Out of 6)	Romana; 8.70% to win (Out of 5)	Jelena J. 12.53% to win (Out of 4)
Evicted	Nela; 22.33% to save	Anastasija; 24.67% to save	Vanja; 29.27% to save	Crni; 18.82% to save	Zuzi Zu; 7.33% to save	Marko Vanilla; 45.09% to save	Čupo; 16.20% to save	Hristijan; 46.24% to save	Divna; 11.85% to save	Džidža; 46% to save	Miss Svetlana; 3% to save	Japa; 22.95% to save	Šeki; 46.59% to save	Boris; 48.23% to save	Suzana; 10.52% to save	Vajs; 6.43% to save	Edin; 14.14% to win (Out of 3)	Slobodan; 40.76% to win	Jelena G. 59.24% to win

== Season 6 ==
- Start Date: 27 August 2015
- End Date: 30 December 2015
- Duration: 126 days
- The Prize: €50,000
- Main Presenter: Ognjen Amidžić, Dušica Jakovljević & sometimes Aleksandra Jeftanović
- Winner: Stanija Dobrojević
- PEGI Descriptor: Drugs

=== Contestants ===
No.	Celebrity	Hometown	Famous for... / Occupation	Age	Entered	Exited
1	Milić Vukašinović	Belgrade, Serbia	Musician	65	Day 1	Day 83
2	Suzana Vukašinović	Belgrade, Serbia	Wife of Milić Vukašinović	41	Day 1	Day 83
3	Nela Bijanić	Smederevo, Serbia	Singer	45	Day 1	Day 19
4	Bojan Tomović	Sombor, Serbia	Singer	32	Day 1	Day 6
5	Lepomir Bakić		Bodybuilder	29	Day 1	Day 26
6	Novica Zdravković		Singer	68	Day 1	Day 33
7	Jasmina Medenica		Singer, actress	51	Day 1	Day 126; 4th place
8	Gabrijela Pejčev	Dimitrovgrad, Serbia	Contestant of Pinkove Zvezde	22	Day 1	Day 126; 5th place
9	Aleksandar Živanović	Topola, Serbia	Contestant of Pinkove Zvezde	25	Day 1	Day 126; 7th place
10	Vladimir "Vlada" Stanojević	Belgrade, Serbia	TV personality	33	Day 1	Day 82
11	Jelena Milošević		Ballet dancer		Day 1	Day 64
12	Tamara Đurić	Belgrade, Serbia	Clubber	26	Day 1 Day 103	Day 98; Runner-Up
13	Jelena Krunić		Go-Go dancer	28	Day 1 Day 82	Day 43; Day 125
14	Rade Lazić	Valjevo, Serbia	Model	25	Day 1	Day 96
15	Anabela Atijas	Goražde, Bosnia & Herzegovina	Singer	40	Day 1	Day 15
16	Radmila Misić		Singer	50	Day 1	Day 75
17	Zvezdan Anđić	Belgrade, Serbia	Husband of Tina Ivanović		Day 1	Day 5
18	Radiša "Radašin" Miljković	Aleksinac, Serbia	Reality star	55	Day 1	Day 125
19	Ivana Šašić	Šabac. Serbia	Singer	40	Day 1	Day 103
20	Sanela Anna Vujinović	Nova Pazova, Serbia	Singer	26	Day 1	Day 12
21	Goran "Šabanoti" Kostić		Musicisian		Day 1	Day 5
22	Bojana Stamenov	Belgrade, Serbia	Singer	29	Day 1	Day 124
23	Marija "Maja" Nikolić	Niš, Serbia	Singer	39	Day 1	Day 126; 6th place
24	Stanija Dobrojević	Virovitica, Croatia	Starlet	29	Day 1	Day 126; Winner
25	Aleksandar "Kristijan" Golubović	Munich, Germany	Criminal	46	Day 1 Day 103	Day 92; Day 122
26	Zorica Marković	Kosjerić, Serbia	Singer	56	Day 4	Day 52
27	Ivan Gavrilović	Belgrade, Serbia	Singer	47	Day 12	Day 68
28	Ali King	Bosnia and Herzegovina	Rapper		Day 12	Day 27
29	Goga Sekulić	Pljevlja, Montenegro	Singer	38	Day 18	Day 20
30	Miloš Radičević	Trstenik, Serbia	Model	28	Day 22	Day 126; 3rd Place
31	Miroslav Pržulj "Lepi Mića"	Sarajevo, Bosnia & Herzegovina	Singer	44	Day 26	Day 125
32	Milica Ranković		Singer	21	Day 36	Day 43
32	Sanja Lazić		Singer	20	Day 36	Day 61
33	Alen Muković		Singer	27	Day 36	Day 124
34	Saša Katančić		Singer	37	Day 36	Day 54
35	Danijel Mitrović	Jagodina, Serbia	Singer		Day 36	Day 40
36	Tijana Đuričić		Starlet	24	Day 40	Day 47
37	Semir Džanković	Novi Pazar, Serbia	Contestant of Pinkove Zvezde	25	Day 54	Day 97
38	Nikolina Stevović	Tivat, Montenegro	Model		Day 54	Day 89
39	Vesna Vukelić Vendi	Belgrade, Serbia	Singer, glamour model and reality TV star	43	Day 60	Day 120
40	Lepa Lukić	Serbia	Singer	75	Day 76	Day 110
41	Dragana Šarić "Bebi Dol"	Belgrade, Serbia	Singer	53	Day 76	Day 117
42	Andrija Đogani "Baki B3"	Zemun, Serbia	Singer	40	Day 76	Day 110
43	Jelena Golubović	Belgrade, Serbia	Actress/Director, Winner of Farma 5	36	Day 96	Day 126

=== Nominations ===
	Round 1	Round 2	Round 3	Round 4	Round 5	Round 6	Round 7	Round 8	Round 9	Round 10	Round 11	Round 12	Round 13	Round 14	Round 15	Round 16	Round 17	Final		
Farm Leader (Immunity)	Zvezdan (Ejected); Lepomir	Maja	Stanija	Zorica	Maja	Kristijan	Radašin	Rade	Milić (Banned); Tamara	Kristijan	Alen	Miloš	Tamara (Banned); Kristijan	Mića	Mića	Aleksandar	Aleksandar	None		
Leader's Servants	Maja; Bojan	Stanija; Kristijan	Bojana; Lepomir	Jelena M. Ivan; Gabrijela Rade	Stanija; Aleksandar	Jelena K. Rade	Maja; Miloš	Bojana; Vlada	Jasmina; Kristijan	Nikolina; Mića	Radmila; Miloš	Ivana; Alen	Ivana; Aleksandar	Bebi; Rade	Vendi; Radašin	Jasmina; Alen	Jelena G. Radašin	None		
Stanija	Maja	Nominated	Lepomir	Rade	Nominated	Rade	Banned	Vlada	Jasmina	Nikolina	Radmila	Ivana	Aleksandar	Rade	Radašin	Alen	Banned	Winner (Day 126)		
Tamara	Bojan	Stanija	Lepomir	Gabrijela	Stanija	Rade	Maja	Bojana	Jasmina	Banned	Radmila	Ivana	Ivana	Bebi	Ejected (Day 98)	Jasmina	Banned	Runner-Up (Day 126)		
Miloš	Not in The Farm			Gabrijela	Stanija	Rade	Nominated	Bojana	Jasmina	Mića	Nominated	Ivana	Ivana	Rade	Vendi	Alen	Jelena G.	3rd Place (Day 126)		
Jasmina	Bojan	Kristijan	Lepomir	Rade	Aleksandar	Rade	Maja	Bojana	Nominated	Mića	Miloš	Alen	Aleksandar	Rade	Radašin	Nominated	Radašin	4th Place (Day 126)		
Gabrijela	Bojan	Kristijan	Lepomir	Nominated	Stanija	Rade	Miloš	Vlada	Kristijan	Nikolina	Radmila	Alen	Ivana	Rade	Banned	Alen	Jelena G.	5th Place (Day 126)		
Maja	Nominated	Kristijan	Lepomir	Rade	Stanija	Rade	Nominated	Vlada	Jasmina	Nikolina	Radmila	Ivana	Ivana	Bebi	Banned	Jasmina	Jelena G.	6th Place (Day 126)		
Aleksandar	Bojan	Kristijan	Lepomir	Gabrijela	Nominated	Rade	Maja	Bojana	Jasmina	Nikolina	Radmila	Ivana	Nominated	Rade	Vendi	Alen	Jelena G.	7th Place (Day 126)		
Jelena G.	Not in The Farm														Radašin	Alen	Nominated	Guest (Day 96–126)		
Jelena K.	Bojan	Stanija	Lepomir	Rade	Stanija	Nominated	Walked (Day 43)						Ivana	Rade	Vendi	Alen	Jelena G.	Evicted (Day 125)		
Radašin	Bojan	Stanija	Lepomir	Rade	Stanija	Rade	Maja	Bojana	Jasmina	Nikolina	Radmila	Ivana	Ivana	Rade	Nominated	Alen	Nominated	Evicted (Day 125)		
Mića	Not in The Farm				Aleksandar	Rade	Miloš	Bojana	Kristijan	Nominated	Radmila	Ivana	Ivana	Rade	Radašin	Alen	Jelena G.	Evicted (Day 125)		
Bojana	Bojan	Kristijan	Nominated	Rade	Aleksandar	Rade	Miloš	Nominated	Jasmina	Nikolina	Radmila	Ivana	Ivana	Rade	Radašin	Alen	Jelena G.	Evicted (Day 124)		
Alen	Not in The Farm					Rade	Maja	Bojana	Kristijan	Nikolina	Radmila	Nominated	Ivana	Rade	Vendi	Nominated	Jelena G.	Evicted (Day 124)		
Kristijan	Maja	Nominated	Lepomir	Rade	Aleksandar	Rade	Banned	Vlada	Nominated	Mića	Miloš	Alen	Aleksandar	Ejected (Day 92)		Alen	Radašin	Walked (Day 122)		
Vendi	Not in The Farm									Nikolina	Radmila	Ivana	Ivana	Bebi	Nominated	Alen	Jelena G.	Evicted (Day 120)		
Bebi	Not in The Farm											Alen	Aleksandar	Nominated	Vendi	Jasmina	Jelena G.	Evicted (Day 117)		
Baki	Not in The Farm											Alen	Aleksandar	Rade	Radašin	Alen	Evicted (Day 110)			
Lepa	Not in The Farm											Alen	Ivana	Rade	Radašin	Jasmina	Walked (Day 110)			
Ivana	Bojan	Stanija	Lepomir	Gabrijela	Stanija	Rade	Maja	Bojana	Jasmina	Nikolina	Banned	Nominated	Nominated	Rade	Vendi	Evicted (Day 103)				
Semir	Not in The Farm								Jasmina	Nikolina	Banned	Ivana	Ivana	Rade	Ejected (Day 97)					
Rade	Maja	Kristijan	Lepomir	Nominated	Stanija	Nominated	Miloš	Vlada	Kristijan	Mića	Radmila	Ivana	Ivana	Nominated	Evicted (Day 96)					
Nikolina	Not in The Farm								Jasmina	Nominated	Radmila	Ivana	Ivana	Evicted (Day 89)						
Milić	Maja	Stanija	Lepomir	Rade	Aleksandar	Rade	Miloš	Bojana	Banned	Nikolina	Miloš	Ivana	Walked (Day 83)							
Suzana	Bojan	Stanija	Lepomir	Rade	Aleksandar	Rade	Miloš	Vlada	Banned	Nikolina	Miloš	Ivana	Walked (Day 83)							
Vlada	Bojan	Kristijan	Lepomir	Gabrijela	Stanija	Rade	Maja	Nominated	Kristijan	Mića	Radmila	Ivana	Evicted (Day 82)							
Radmila	Bojan	Stanija	Lepomir	Rade	Stanija	Rade	Maja	Bojana	Jasmina	Nikolina	Nominated	Evicted (Day 75)								
Ivan	Not in The Farm		Lepomir	Banned	Stanija	Banned	Miloš	Bojana	Jasmina	Nikolina	Evicted (Day 68)									
Jelena M.	Bojan	Stanija	Lepomir	Banned	Stanija	Banned	Miloš	Vlada	Jasmina	Banned	Walked (Day 64)									
Sanja	Not in The Farm					Rade	Maja	Bojana	Jasmina	Evicted (Day 61)										
Saša	Not in The Farm					Rade	Maja	Bojana	Evicted (Day 54)											
Zorica	Not in The Farm	Stanija	Bojana	Rade	Stanija	Rade	Maja	Bojana	Walked (Day 52)											
Tijana	Not in The Farm						Banned	Evicted (Day 47)												
Milica	Not in The Farm					Rade	Evicted (Day 43)													
Danijel	Not in The Farm					Rade	Evicted (Day 40)													
Novica	Maja	Stanija	Lepomir	Gabrijela	Stanija	Evicted (Day 33)														
Ali	Not in The Farm		Lepomir	Gabrijela	Ejected (Day 27)															
Lepomir	Maja	Kristijan	Nominated	Gabrijela	Evicted (Day 26)															
Goga	Not in The Farm			Ejected (Day 20)																
Nela	Bojan	Kristijan	Lepomir	Evicted (Day 19)																
Anabela	Bojan	Kristijan	Walked (Day 15)																	
Sanela	Bojan	Kristijan	Evicted (Day 12)																	
Bojan	Nominated	Ejected (Day 6)																		
Šabanoti	Maja	Evicted (Day 5)																		
Zvezdan	Maja	Ejected (Day 5)																		
Walked	None		Anabela	None			Jelena K.	Zorica	None	Jelena M.	None '		Suzana; Milić	None		Lepa	None		Kristijan	None
Ejected	Zvezdan	Bojan	None	Goga	Ali	None								Kristijan	Semir; Tamara	None				
Guest	None														Jelena G.	None				
1st Nominated (By Group)	Bojan; 15/23 votes	Stanija; 11/21 votes	Lepomir; 20/21 votes	Rade; 11/19 votes	Stanija; 13/19 votes	Rade; 22/22 votes	Maja; 10/18 votes	Bojana; 14/21 votes	Jasmina ??/?? votes	Nikolina ??/?? votes	Radmila; 13/17 votes	Ivana; 15/21 votes	Ivana; 14/21 votes	Rade; 14/17 votes	Radašin; 7/13 votes	Alen; 12/16 votes	Jelena G. 10/12 votes	None		
2nd Nominated (By Public Vote)	Šabanoti	Sanela	Suzana; Nela	Lepomir	Novica	Danijel	Ivan	Saša	Sanja	Ivan	Rade	Vlada	Nikolina	Radašin	Ivana	Baki	Bebi	None		
3rd (4th/5th) Nominated (By Punishment or Else)	/	/	/	Jelena M. Ivan	/	Ivan; Jelena M.	Stanija; Kristijan; Tijana	Jasmina	Milić; Suzana	Tamara; Jelena M.	Ivana; Semir	/	Tamara; Aleksandar	/	Maja; Gabrijela	Jasmina	Stanija; Tamara	None		
Votes x2 (Knowledge Test or Game)	/	Stanija	/	Rade	Stanija	Danijel	Maja	Jasmina	Suzana	/	/	Vlada	/	Radašin	/	Jasmina	Stanija	None		
Evicted	Šabanoti; 11% to save	Sanela; 10% to save	Nela; 24,28% to save	Lepomir; 18,03% to save	Novica; 5% to save	Danijel; 17,48% to save	Tijana; 2,76% to save	Saša; 14,15% to save	Sanja; 3% to save	Ivan; 9,30% to save	Radmila; 22,05% to save	Vlada; 48,50% to save	Nikolina; 6,58% to save	Rade; 10% to save	Ivana; 4,70% to save	Baki; 5,62% to save	Bebi; 1,68% to save	Vendi; 0,35% to win(Out of 13)	Alen; 0,56% to win(Out of 12)	Bojana; 0,92% to win(Out of 11)
Evicted	Šabanoti; 11% to save	Sanela; 10% to save	Nela; 24,28% to save	Lepomir; 18,03% to save	Novica; 5% to save	Danijel; 17,48% to save	Tijana; 2,76% to save	Saša; 14,15% to save	Sanja; 3% to save	Ivan; 9,30% to save	Radmila; 22,05% to save	Vlada; 48,50% to save	Nikolina; 6,58% to save	Rade; 10% to save	Ivana; 4,70% to save	Baki; 5,62% to save	Bebi; 1,68% to save	Mića; 1,03% to win(Out of 10)	Radašin; 1,75% to win(Out of 9)	Jelena K. 2,03% to win(Out of 8)
Evicted	Šabanoti; 11% to save	Sanela; 10% to save	Nela; 24,28% to save	Lepomir; 18,03% to save	Novica; 5% to save	Danijel; 17,48% to save	Tijana; 2,76% to save	Saša; 14,15% to save	Sanja; 3% to save	Ivan; 9,30% to save	Radmila; 22,05% to save	Vlada; 48,50% to save	Nikolina; 6,58% to save	Rade; 10% to save	Ivana; 4,70% to save	Baki; 5,62% to save	Bebi; 1,68% to save	Aleksandar; 1,56% to win(Out of 7)	Maja; 3,05% to win (Out of 6)	Gabrijela; 3,23% to win (Out of 5)
Evicted	Šabanoti; 11% to save	Sanela; 10% to save	Nela; 24,28% to save	Lepomir; 18,03% to save	Novica; 5% to save	Danijel; 17,48% to save	Tijana; 2,76% to save	Saša; 14,15% to save	Sanja; 3% to save	Ivan; 9,30% to save	Radmila; 22,05% to save	Vlada; 48,50% to save	Nikolina; 6,58% to save	Rade; 10% to save	Ivana; 4,70% to save	Baki; 5,62% to save	Bebi; 1,68% to save	Jasmina; 6,38% to win (Out of 4)	Miloš; 19,76% to win (Out of 3)	Tamara; 42,34% to win
Evicted	Šabanoti; 11% to save	Sanela; 10% to save	Nela; 24,28% to save	Lepomir; 18,03% to save	Novica; 5% to save	Danijel; 17,48% to save	Tijana; 2,76% to save	Saša; 14,15% to save	Sanja; 3% to save	Ivan; 9,30% to save	Radmila; 22,05% to save	Vlada; 48,50% to save	Nikolina; 6,58% to save	Rade; 10% to save	Ivana; 4,70% to save	Baki; 5,62% to save	Bebi; 1,68% to save	Stanija; 57,66% to win		

== Season 7 ==
- Start Date: 15 February 2016
- End Date: 29 June 2016
- Duration: 136 days
- The Prize: €50,000
- Main Presenter: Ognjen Amidžić, Dušica Jakovljević, Katarina Nikolić & sometimes Vladimir Stanojević
- Winner: Jelena Golubović
- PEGI Descriptor: Gambling

This season of "the reality farm" was the longest in the world.

=== Contestants ===
No.	Celebrity	Hometown	Famous for... / Occupation	Age	Entered	Exited	Note
1	Sani Ibrahimov "Sani Trik FX"	New Belgrade, Serbia	Singer & Natalija's husband		Day 1	Day 50	Walked
2	Natalija Ibrahimov "Natalija Trik FX"	New Belgrade, Serbia	Singer & Sani's wife	45	Day 1	Day 36	Walked
3	Svetlana "Ceca" Jovanović	Belgrade, Serbia	Model	20	Day 1	Day 136	4th place
4	Nemanja Milošević "MC N"	Niš, Serbia	Rapper	32	Day 1	Day 136	3rd place
5	Dušica Grabović	Priboj, Serbia	Singer & ex-contestant of the reality show "Parovi", daughter of Iva Grabović (12 November 1950 – 1 March 2007)	34	Day 1	Day 134	Evicted
6	Živojin "Žika" Đorđević	Leskovac, Serbia	Frontman of the band "Viva Romana"	36	Day 1	Day 136	2nd place
7	Milan Obradović "Miki Mećava"	Prokuplje, Serbia	Singer	54	Day 1	Day 136	6th place
8	Kristina Čanković	New Belgrade, Serbia	Singer & ballet dancer	39	Day 1	Day 43	Evicted
9	Veselin Doknić	Vrbas, Serbia	Professional model		Day 1	Day 4	Direct evicted
10	Đogani Gazmen "Gagi"	Belgrade, Serbia	Singer of the music band "Funky G"	44	Day 1	Day 28	Ejected
11	Marija Mijanović	Cetinje, Montenegro	Singer of the music band "Funky G"	30	Day 1	Day 92	Evicted
12	Filip Đukić	Belgrade, Serbia	Model & ex-contestant of the reality show "Parovi"	28	Day 1	Day 134	Evicted
13	Stefan Despotović "Despot"	Belgrade, Serbia	Fitness instructor	24	Day 1	Day 22	Evicted
14	Gorana "Goga" Aleksić	Belgrade, Serbia	Go-go dancer	23	Day 1	Day 134	Evicted
15	Milan Đorđević "Crni"	Belgrade, Serbia	Student & DJ	28	Day 1 Day 100	Day 99; Day 127	Evicted; Guest
16	Aleksandra Blagojević	Užice, Serbia	Singer & ex-contestant of "Pinkove zvezde"	32	Day 1	Day 15	Evicted
17	Stefan Jakovljević	Zaječar, Serbia	Singer	28	Day 1 Day 63	Day 50; Day 85	Evicted
18	Maja Milošević	Jagodina, Serbia	Singer & ex-contestant of "Pinkove zvezde"	26	Day 1	Day 120	Evicted
19	Čedomir "Čedo" Đačić	Pljevlja, Montenegro	Songwriter		Day 1	Day 23	Direct evicted
20	Ivona Negovanović "Cuca"	Belgrade, Serbia	Singer & ex-contestant of reality shows "Parovi" and "Maldivi"	27	Day 1	Day 36	Evicted
21	Rajko Kovačević "Rajko Horizont"	Šabac, Serbia	Showman & singer		Day 1	Day 8	Evicted
22	Bane Đokić	Belgrade, Serbia	PR Manager	26	Day 1	Day 29	Evicted
23	Marina Perazić	Rijeka, Croatia	Singer	58	Day 1	Day 136	5th place
24	Zvonko Pantović "Čipi"	Kragujevac, Serbia	Frontman of music band "Osvajači"	50	Day 1	Day 132	Evicted
25	Zorica Marković "Keva"	Stari Slankamen, Serbia	Ex-contestant of "Veliki brat"	49	Day 1	Day 113	Evicted
26	Zorica Marković	Kosjerić, Serbia	Singer	57	Day 1	Day 37	Walked
27	Velibor "Džaro" Džarovski	Skopje, Macedonia	Sports manager and the king of setups	68	Day 1	Day 4	Walked
28	Vesna Zmijanac	Nikšić, Montenegro	Professional singer / Cantatrice	59	Day 1	Day 95	Ejected
29	Savka Gazivoda "Saška Karan"	Vukovar, Croatia	Singer	52	Day 4	Day 133	Evicted
30	Nikola Lakić	Belgrade, Serbia	Football player	33	Day 8	Day 123	Direct evicted
31	Jelena Milošević "Balerina"	Novi Sad, Serbia	Ballet dancer & actress	32	Day 22	Day 64	Evicted
32	Miroslav Pržulj "Lepi Mića"	Sarajevo, Bosnia and Herzegovina	Singer	56	Day 22	Day 132	Evicted
33	Jasmina Medenica	Priština, Serbia	Singer & actress	51	Day 29	Day 57	Evicted
34	Jelena Golubović	Užice, Serbia	Actress/Director	36	Day 30	Day 136	Winner
35	Svetlana Golubović	Užice, Serbia	Jelena's mother	65	Day 30	Day 106	Evicted
36	Sandra Valterović "Sexy Sandra"	Beograd, Serbia	Singer	28	Day 44	Day 71	Evicted
37	Marija Ana Smiljanić	Paraćin, Serbia	Singer & ex-contestant of the reality show "Parovi"	24	Day 44	Day 136	7th place
38	Nemanja Maksimović "Maksa"	Ub, Serbia	Singer & ex-contestant of "Pinkove zvezde"	23	Day 44	Day 78	Evicted
39	Anđela Mitkovski "Anđela Veštica"	Bor, Serbia	Go-go dancer & starlet	24	Day 50	Day 62	Walked
40	Miloš Radičević	Trstenik, Serbia	Model	29	Day 85	Day 89	Guest

=== Nominations ===
	Round 1	Round 2	Round 3	Round 4	Round 5	Round 6	Round 7	Round 8	Round 9	Round 10	Round 11	Round 12	Round 13	Round 14	Round 15	Round 16	Round 17	Round 18	Final		
Farm Leader (Immunity)	Miki	Čedo	Maja	Ceca	Nikola	Marina	Dušica	Jelena	Sandra	Mića	Crni	Mića	Nemanja	Maja	Mića	Jelena	Goga	Žika	None		
Leader's Servants	Vesna; Čedo	Dušica; Filip	Goga; Bane	Saška; Nikola	Ceca; Filip	Kristina; Stefan	Marina; Žika	Keva; Mića	Jelena; Crni	Sandra; Crni	Svetlana; Miki	MarijaAna; Nemanja	Maja; Čipi	Dušica; Nikola	Jelena; Žika	Ceca; Čipi	Saška; Žika	Marina; Miki	None		
Jelena	Not in The Farm				Ceca	Stefan	Žika	Keva	Nominated	Crni	Miki	Nemanja	Čipi	Dušica	Nominated	Ceca	Žika	Miki	Winner (Day 136)		
Žika	Čedo	Dušica	Bane	?	Ceca	Kristina	Nominated	Keva	Jelena	Sandra	Svetlana	Marija Ana	Maja	Nikola	Nominated	Ceca	Nominated	Miki	Runner-Up (Day 136)		
Nemanja	Čedo	Dušica	Goga	?	Ceca	Kristina	Marina	Keva	Crni	Sandra	Svetlana	Nominated	Maja	Nikola	Jelena	Ceca	Saška	Marina	3rd Place (Day 136)		
Ceca	Čedo	Dušica	Bane	?	Nominated	Stefan	Žika	Keva	Crni	Sandra	Miki	Marija Ana	Čipi	Nikola	Jelena	Nominated	Saška	Marina	4th Place (Day 136)		
Marina	Čedo	Dušica	Goga	?	Ceca	Kristina	Nominated	Keva	Jelena	Sandra	Svetlana	Marija Ana	Maja	Nikola	Jelena	Ceca	Saška	Nominated	5th Place (Day 136)		
Miki	Vesna	Dušica	Bane	?	Ceca	Kristina	Marina	Mića	Crni	Sandra	Nominated	Nemanja	Maja	Dušica	Žika	Ceca	Saška	Nominated	6th Place (Day 136)		
Marija Ana	Not in The Farm						Marina	Keva	Jelena	Crni	Svetlana	Nominated	Čipi	Dušica	Žika	Ceca	Žika	Marina	7th Place (Day 136)		
Dušica	Čedo	Nominated	Bane	?	Ceca	Stefan	Marina	Keva	Jelena	Banned	Svetlana	Marija Ana	Maja	Nominated	Jelena	Ceca	Žika	Miki	Evicted (Day 134)		
Filip	Čedo	Nominated	Bane	?	Nominated	Kristina	Marina	Keva	Jelena	Sandra	Svetlana	Marija Ana	Maja	Dušica	Žika	Ceca	Saška	Marina	Evicted (Day 134)		
Goga	Čedo	Dušica	Nominated	?	Ceca	Kristina	Marina	Mića	Jelena	Sandra	Svetlana	Nemanja	Maja	Dušica	Jelena	Ceca	Saška	Marina	Evicted (Day 134)		
Saška	Vesna	Dušica	Banned	Nominated	Ceca	Stefan	Marina	Mića	Jelena	Sandra	Miki	Nemanja	Maja	Nikola	Jelena	Ceca	Nominated	Miki	Evicted (Day 133)		
Čipi	Čedo	Dušica	Goga	?	Ceca	Kristina	Marina	Keva	Jelena	Sandra	Svetlana	Marija Ana	Nominated	Nikola	Jelena	Nominated	Saška	Miki	Evicted (Day 132)		
Mića	Not in The Farm			?	Ceca	Kristina	Marina	Nominated	Jelena	Sandra	Miki	Marija Ana	Maja	Nikola	Jelena	Ceca	Žika	Marina	Evicted (Day 132)		
Crni	Čedo	Dušica	Bane	?	Filip	Kristina	Marina	Keva	Nominated	Nominated	Miki	Banned	Maja	Dušica	Evicted (Day 99); Žika	Čipi	Žika	Miki	Guest (Day 100–127)		
Nikola	Not in The Farm	Dušica	Goga	Nominated	Ceca	Kristina	Marina	Keva	Jelena	Sandra	Miki	Marija Ana	Maja	Nominated	Žika	Ceca	Saška	Evicted (Day 123)			
Maja	Čedo	Dušica	Goga	?	Ceca	Kristina	Marina	Mića	Jelena	Sandra	Svetlana	Marija Ana	Nominated	Nikola	Jelena	Ceca	Saška	Evicted (Day 120)			
Keva	Čedo	Dušica	Goga	?	Ceca	Kristina	Marina	Nominated	Jelena	Sandra	Svetlana	Marija Ana	Čipi	Dušica	Žika	Ceca	Evicted (Day 113)				
Svetlana	Not in The Farm				Ceca	Kristina	Marina	Keva	Crni	Sandra	Nominated	Marija Ana	Čipi	Dušica	Žika	Evicted (Day 106)					
Vesna	Nominated	Filip	Bane	?	Ceca	Kristina	Marina	Keva	Crni	Sandra	Svetlana	Marija Ana	Maja	Ejected (Day 95)							
Marija	Čedo	Dušica	Bane	?	Ceca	Kristina	Marina	Keva	Jelena	Sandra	Svetlana	Marija Ana	Čipi	Evicted (Day 92)							
Miloš	Not in The Farm												Guest (Day 85–89)								
Stefan	Čedo	Dušica	Bane	?	Ceca	Nominated	Marina	Evicted (Day 50)		Sandra	Miki	Marija Ana	Re-Evicted (Day 85)								
Maksa	Not in The Farm						Marina	Keva	Jelena	Sandra	Svetlana	Evicted (Day 78)									
Sandra	Not in The Farm						Marina	Keva	Jelena	Nominated	Evicted (Day 71)										
Balerina	Not in The Farm			?	Ceca	Kristina	Marina	Keva	Jelena	Evicted (Day 64)											
Anđela	Not in The Farm							Keva	Walked (Day 62)												
Jasmina	Not in The Farm				Filip	Stefan	Žika	Keva	Evicted (Day 57)												
Sani	Čedo	Dušica	Goga	?	Ceca	Stefan	/	Walked (Day 50)													
Kristina	Čedo	Filip	Bane	?	Ceca	Nominated	Evicted (Day 43)														
Zorica M.	Čedo	Dušica	Goga	?	Ceca	Walked (Day 37)															
Cuca	Čedo	Filip	Goga	?	Banned	Evicted (Day 36)															
Natalija	Čedo	Dušica	Goga	?	Ceca	Walked (Day 36)															
Bane	Čedo	Dušica	Nominated	?	Evicted (Day 29)																
Gagi	Čedo	Dušica	Bane	?	Ejected (Day 28)																
Čedo	Nominated	Dušica	Goga	Evicted (Day 23)																	
Despot	Čedo	Dušica	Goga	Evicted (Day 22)																	
Aleksandra	Čedo	Dušica	Evicted (Day 15)																		
Rajko	Čedo	Evicted (Day 8)																			
Veselin	Evicted (Day 4)																				
Džaro	Walked (Day 4)																				
Walked	Džaro	None																			
Ejected	None			Gagi	None																
1st Nominated (By Group)	Čedo; 23/25 votes	Dušica; 22/25 votes	Goga; 12/23 votes	Saška; 15/24 votes	Ceca; 22/24 votes	Kristina; 16/22 votes	Marina; 20/23 votes	Keva; 19/23 votes	Jelena; 16/21 votes	Sandra; 18/20 votes	Svetlana; 13/20 votes	Marija Ana; 14/18 votes	Maja ??/18 votes	Nikola ??/16 votes	Jelena ??/?? votes	Ceca; 14/15 votes	Saška ??/?? votes	Miki; 6/12 votes	None		
2nd Nominated (By Public Vote)	Rajko	Aleksandra	Despot	Bane	Čipi	Marija	Stefan	Jasmina	Balerina	Goga	Maksa	Stefan	Marija	Crni	Svetlana	Keva	Maja	Crni	None		
3rd (4th/5th) Nominated (By Punishment or Else)	/	/	Saška	Gagi (Ejected)	Cuca	/	/	/	/	Dušica	/	Crni	/	/	/	/	/	/	None		
Votes x2 (Knowledge Test or Game)	Rajko	Aleksandra	Goga	Saška	/	Marija	Stefan	/	Balerina	Goga	Svetlana	/	Maja	Nikola	Jelena	Ceca	Saška	Miki	None		
Evicted	Rajko; 47% to save	Aleksandra; 47% to save	Despot; 23,7% to save	Bane; 18% to save	Cuca; 7% to save	Kristina; 19% to save	Stefan; 49% to save	Jasmina; 43% to save	Balerina; 24% to save	Sandra; 13% to save	Maksa; 12% to save	Stefan; 31% to save	Marija; 14% to save	Crni; 14% to save	Svetlana; 7% to save	Keva; 18% to save	Maja; 32% to save	Crni; 7% to save	Mića; 0.52% to win (Out of 13)	Čipi; 0.73% to win (Out of 12)	Saška; 0.91% to win (Out of 11)
Evicted	Rajko; 47% to save	Aleksandra; 47% to save	Despot; 23,7% to save	Bane; 18% to save	Cuca; 7% to save	Kristina; 19% to save	Stefan; 49% to save	Jasmina; 43% to save	Balerina; 24% to save	Sandra; 13% to save	Maksa; 12% to save	Stefan; 31% to save	Marija; 14% to save	Crni; 14% to save	Svetlana; 7% to save	Keva; 18% to save	Maja; 32% to save	Crni; 7% to save	Goga; 1.06% to win (Out of 10)	Filip; 1.88% to win (Out of 9)	Dušica; 2.55% to win (Out of 8)
Evicted	Rajko; 47% to save	Aleksandra; 47% to save	Despot; 23,7% to save	Bane; 18% to save	Cuca; 7% to save	Kristina; 19% to save	Stefan; 49% to save	Jasmina; 43% to save	Balerina; 24% to save	Sandra; 13% to save	Maksa; 12% to save	Stefan; 31% to save	Marija; 14% to save	Crni; 14% to save	Svetlana; 7% to save	Keva; 18% to save	Maja; 32% to save	Crni; 7% to save	Marija Ana; 2.83% to win (Out of 7)	Miki; 4.46% to win (Out of 6)	Marina; 8.05% to win (Out of 5)
Evicted	Rajko; 47% to save	Aleksandra; 47% to save	Despot; 23,7% to save	Bane; 18% to save	Cuca; 7% to save	Kristina; 19% to save	Stefan; 49% to save	Jasmina; 43% to save	Balerina; 24% to save	Sandra; 13% to save	Maksa; 12% to save	Stefan; 31% to save	Marija; 14% to save	Crni; 14% to save	Svetlana; 7% to save	Keva; 18% to save	Maja; 32% to save	Crni; 7% to save	Ceca; 15.80% to win (Out of 4)	Nemanja; 18.12% to win (Out of 3)	Žika; 41.62% to win
Evicted	Rajko; 47% to save	Aleksandra; 47% to save	Despot; 23,7% to save	Bane; 18% to save	Cuca; 7% to save	Kristina; 19% to save	Stefan; 49% to save	Jasmina; 43% to save	Balerina; 24% to save	Sandra; 13% to save	Maksa; 12% to save	Stefan; 31% to save	Marija; 14% to save	Crni; 14% to save	Svetlana; 7% to save	Keva; 18% to save	Maja; 32% to save	Crni; 7% to save	Jelena G. 58.38% to win		

== See also ==
- Parovi
- Big Brother (Serbian TV series)
