= Vesna Vukelić Vendi =

Serbian singer and TV personality (born 1971)

Vesna Vukelić Vendi Весна Вукелић Венди
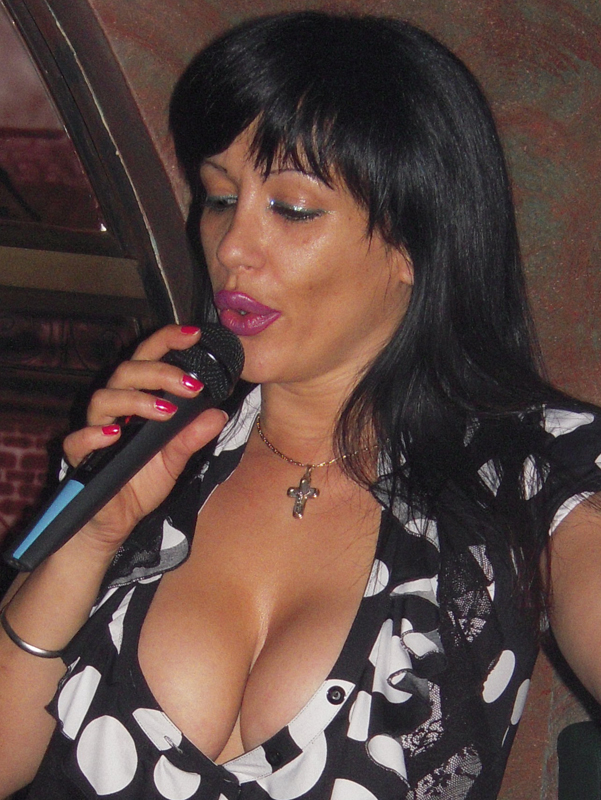
- Vendi performing in 2009

Background information
- Born: Vesna Vukelić; November 25, 1971 (age 54); Belgrade, SFR Yugoslavia
- Genres: Turbo-folk
- Occupations: Singer; glamour model; television personality
- Years active: 1992–present
- Labels: ZaM; MAT; Juvekomerc; Renome

Vesna Vukelić (Serbian Cyrillic: Весна Вукелић; born 25 November 1971), known by her stage name Vendi (Serbian Cyrillic: Венди), is a Serbian singer, television personality and former glamour model. In 1992, She debuted in the movie Dama koja ubija. Vendi has since pursued a career in music and has released five studio albums. Her best known songs include "Praćnuo se šarančić" and "Uljez", and is also known for covering "Jutro je" by Nada Topčagić and "Vruća čokolada" by Dragana Mirtović. Vendi is often dubbed the "Queen of fairs" (Kraljica vašara).

In addition to singing, Vendi has made appearances on reality television shows, including Farma (2009), Veliki Brat (2013), Parovi (2018-2020). Vukelić is also known for her outspoken, religiously charged and often controversial views and comments on other public figures.

== Career ==
Vukelić began her career as a glamour model in the early 1990s and gained notoriety by appearing on the popular talk show hosted by Milovan Ilić Minimaks. She starred in the 1992 television movie Dama koja ubija alongside Velimir Bata Živojinović in the lead role. The following year, Vukelić began her music career by releasing her debut album through ZaM, which included four folk tracks on the A-side and four pop tracks on the B-side. To promote the album she hosted ten episodes of her own late-night talk show on RTV Politika. Vendi's sophomore album, Ljubavna igra, was released in 1995.

It was followed by albums Želim s tobom sve (2001) and Praćnuo se šarančić (2004) in collaboration with Južni Vetar. She also starred as Queen Draga Mašin in the movie Draga Mašin u ormaru, directed by Isidora Bjelica. However, after the footage had been stolen the project was postponed for good. Same year, she was featured on the cover of Serbian Playboy magazine, in the June 2004 issue. The photoshoot took place at the compound of the historical Beli dvor. In 2007, Vendi released her last album to date, titled Ucena, featuring her signature hit "Uljez".

In 2010, Vukelić took part on the reality series Farma, where she was noted for her interactions and relationship with Ekrem Jevrić. Vendi was evicted on Day 108, a night before the grand final. In 2011, she co-wrote and performed in a comedy play Vendi u Petkovim mukama throughout Montenegro. In 2011, Vukelić was also nominated for the title of Serbian gay icon, but lost to singer Marina Perazić. She has since been known for making homophobic remarks. In 2013, she appeared on the fifth celebrity edition of Serbian Big Brother, where she also got evicted a day before the final. In 2018, Vukelić became a presenter of the reality show Parovi.

In July 2022, Vukelić published a novel, titled Misterija crne žene (Mystery of the Black Woman). In October, she promoted the book at the Belgrade Book Fair.

== Personal life ==
Vukelić was born on 25 November 1971 in Belgrade, SFR Yugoslavia. She has a younger sister, Maja Vukelić, who won the title of Miss YU in 1994.

In 1991, she was romantically involved with the president of Serbian Radical Party, Vojislav Šešelj. In 2001, Vukelić married former player of OFK Beograd, Branimir Banjac. The couple has a daughter, named Nikoleta.

She practices Eastern Orthodox Christianity and is vocal about her faith in public.

She is third cousins with Draško Stanivuković, a Bosnian Serb Politician and the current mayor of Banja Luka.

== Discography ==
Studio albums

- Malo vruće, malo hladno (1993)
- Ljubavna igra (1995)
- Želim s’ tobom sve (2001)
- Praćnuo se šarančić (2004)
- Ucena (2007)

== Filmography ==
Filmography of Vesna Vukelić Vendi
Year	Title	Genre	Role	Notes
1992	Dama koja ubija	Television	Girl #1	
1992	Toplo-hladno	Television	Herself	Presenter
2004	Sav taj folk	Television	Herself	
2010	Farma	Television	Herself	Season 3, 7th place
2011	Dvor	Television	Herself	Guest
2013	Veliki Brat VIP	Television	Herself	Season 5, Eliminated 10th
2014	Odavno posvađane	Television	Herself	
2015	Farma	Television	Herself	Season 6, 14th place
2018–2020	Parovi	Television	Herself	Presenter

== Bibliography ==
Books

- Vukelić, Vesna (2022). Misterija crne žene. Srpska kuća. ISBN 978-86-6227-326-0.
