= Lepi =

Lepi may refer to:

== People ==
- Lepi Mića, Serbian singer-songwriter
- Redžep Redžepović "Lepi", Bosniak-Serbian singer

== Places ==
- Lépi, Angola
- Lepi or Lepina, Kosovo

== Other ==
- Lepi, species in Star Wars
