= Letnji Kamp (TV series) =

Serbian reality television series

- Genre: reality TV series
- Presented by: Zorica Dukić; Nikola Lakić; Tihomir Filipović; Bojana Ristivojević; Anđela Lakićević
- Country of origin: Serbia
- Original language: Serbian
- No. of series: 1

Production
- Producer: Happy TV
- Running time: Depends, can take around half a day in total
- Production company: Happy TV

Original release
- Network: Happy TV
- Release: 11 July 2018 – August 25, 2018

Related
- Maldivi

Letnji Kamp (Serbian Cyrillic: Летњи камп) is a Serbian reality TV series broadcasting on Happy TV, as a successor of the Maldivi reality TV show. The winner of the first season is Ana Nedeljković, publicly known as Enn La Rush.

== Concept ==
Participants in this reality show will have to win the games given to them every day for two months. Participants are divided into two teams, the blue and the yellow team, and every Saturday the team that had more wins in the games gets a privilege, while the team that lost becomes unprivileged and has various tasks related to cleaning the camp, making food, and satisfying the opposing team. After two weeks of broadcasting, the games have been withdrawn, and instead, the participants will have to keep the flag with the logo of Letnji Kamp.

If a privileged team drops the flag, the opposing team automatically becomes privileged. Then on Sunday during the knockout, only members of the non-privileged team can be nominated, after which 20 spectators appear, choosing two of the three participants who will no longer be able to win the main prize. After the two participants are voted, they automatically get many disadvantages, such as sleeping in a tent, a ban on entering the summer house, or any room other than the toilet.
