= Saška Karan =

- Birth name: Savka Gazivoda
- Born: 6 March 1964 (age 61)
- Genres: Folk
- Occupation: Singer

Saška Karan (born Savka Gazivoda, 6 March 1964) is a Serbian singer and reality television participant.

She released five albums at the beginning of the 1990s, and after a 6 years hiatus, another 2 albums in the 2000s.

In the 2010s, she took part in the reality TV shows Farma (2013), Zadruga (2017) and Parovi (2015) on Serbian TV.

== Studio albums ==
- 1990: Osmeh zavarava
- 1991: Srce puno baruta
- 1993: Koliko mi se sviđaš, već mi se priviđaš
- 1994: Jedan i jedan su tri
- 1995: Obožavam žestoke mladiće
- 2001: Ukrštenica
- 2005: Lepa kao greh
