= Enn La Rush =

Serbian singer

- Born: Ana Nedeljković; 12 August 2000 (age 25)
- Occupations: YouTuber; singer; TV personality; social media personality

YouTube information
- Channel: Enn La Rush
- Years active: 2015–present
- Genres: Entertainment; comedy; music
- Subscribers: 284 thousand
- Views: 62 million
- Last updated: April 8, 2026
- Musical career
- Genres: Pop; trap
- Years active: 2017–present
- Label: MIXGY Music Group

Ana Nedeljković (Serbian Cyrillic: Ана Недељковић; born 8 December 2000), known by her stage name Enn La Rush, is a Serbian singer, TV personality, YouTuber and internet personality, who rose to prominence by winning the first season of Serbian reality TV show Letnji Kamp.

== Life and career ==
Ana Nedeljković was born on December 8, 2000, in Belgrade. Ana entered the world of social media when she created a YouTube channel back in 2015. Ana collaborated with Bosnian rapper Panter on his single entitled Pun Gas back in 2017, for which the video was filmed in Banja Luka.

In July 2017, Ana entered the Serbian TV reality show Letnji Kamp as the first participant, and thus opened the competition. Various controversies began around her entry into reality competition because she was a minor during the show. Soon after, Ana discovered that the production of Happy Television invited her to participate because she already had a successful career behind her. She immediately attracted sympathies and support from the audience as a candidate who openly talks about suicide problems and as someone who teaches adults the basics around the household.

After the show, she decided to pursue a career in music with her debut single "Drama", released on 26 April 2019.

== Television appearances ==
- Letnji Kamp (2018); winner

== Discography ==
Singles

- Pun Gas (2017) feat. Panter
- Drama (2019) feat. Panter
- Evre Slažem (2020)
