= Milomir Marić =

Serbian journalist and writer (born 1956)

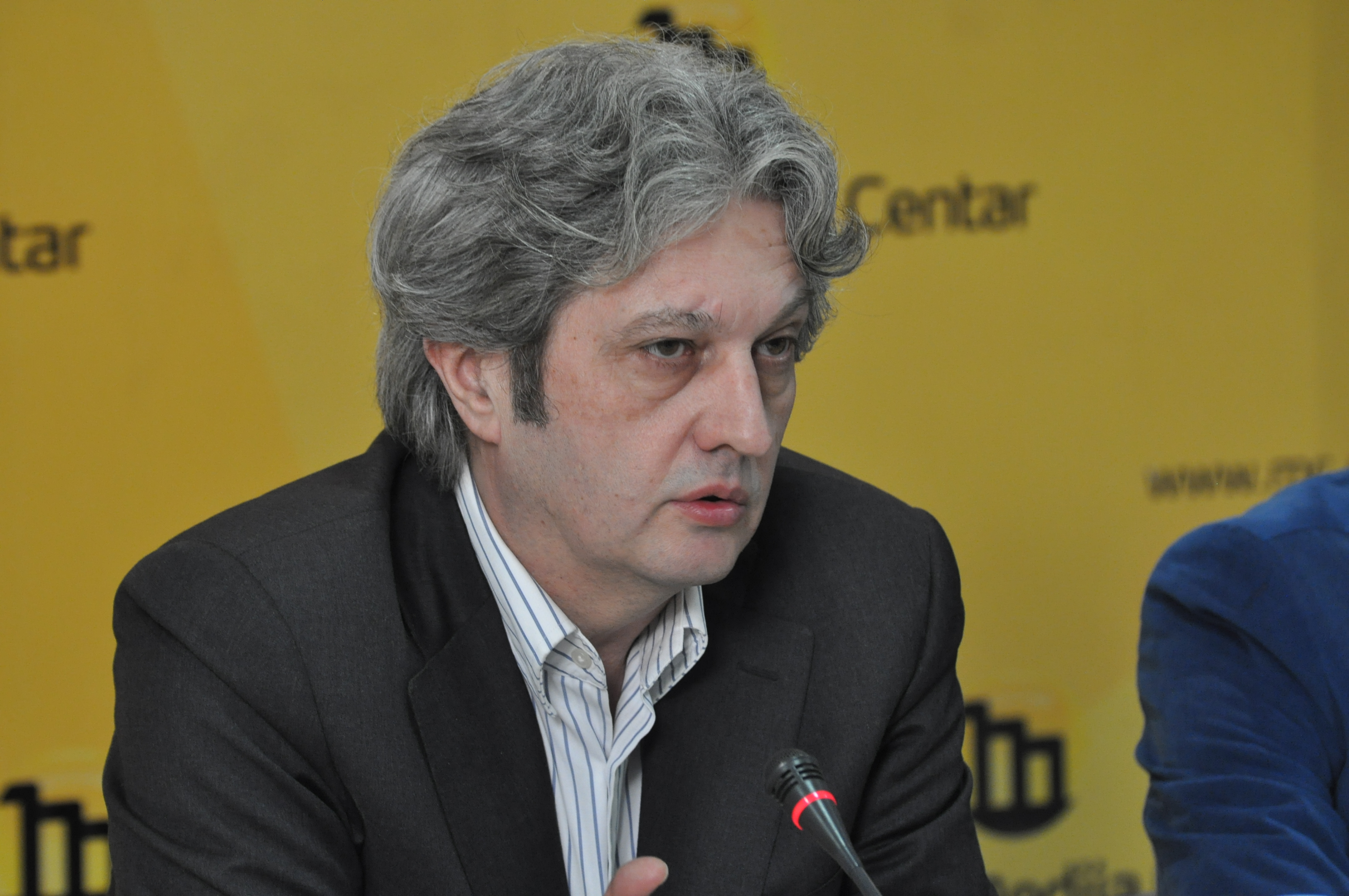
- Marić promoting the third season of Parovi reality show in February 2015.
- Born: 7 January 1956 (age 70); Gornji Milanovac, PR Serbia, Yugoslavia
- Occupations: Journalist, writer
- Years active: 1970s–present
- Notable work: Deca komunizma

Milomir Marić (Serbian Cyrillic: Миломир Марић; born 7 January 1956) is a Serbian journalist and writer. Currently, he is host of several programs on Happy TV — daily morning show Dobro jutro Srbijo, weekly panel show Ćirilica, irregularly broadcast one-on-one talk show Goli život, as well as earlier the reality show Parovi.

== Biography ==
Marić studied Journalism at the Faculty of Political Science in Belgrade. He began his journalism career in the mid-1970s at Duga, a bi-weekly magazine re-launched a few years earlier in the early 1970s in Belgrade, Socialist Federal Republic of Yugoslavia. He made his name via interviews with Yugoslav dissidents, such as Franjo Tuđman, whom he interviewed in 1981. His articles were controversial and in some cases led to terminations of his editors and supervisors.

Throughout the 1980s, Marić was able to secure interviews with a number of aging Yugoslav communists — a basis for his 1987 book Deca komunizma ("Children of Communism"). Vladimir Dedijer was his mentor during the time (1979–1986) he wrote this book. The book was a considerable commercial and critical success, and he soon got an invitation to speak at Yale, Harvard and Princeton.

In the early 1990s, he returned to Belgrade and his old magazine Duga where he was appointed editor-in-chief. Although the magazine was ostensibly critical of Slobodan Milošević, it also published a monthly column written by Milošević's wife Mira Marković, which was often ridiculed for its poetic naivety. During this time, Duga journalist Dada Vujasinović died from a gunshot under suspicious circumstances (the death is officially described as suicide).

Later in the 1990s, Marić was sacked from Duga, leading to a period during which he worked for and edited several publications, including most notably Profil, which he launched himself.

In 2001, he became a director at Bogoljub Karić's BK TV. His involvement with BKTV ended during the mid-2000s after the network lost its national broadcasting license.

By 2008, Marić landed at the Predrag "Peconi" Ranković-owned Happy TV where he has been working ever since.
