= Goca Božinovska =

Serbian singer (born 1965)

Goca Božinovska Гоца Божиновска
- Born: Gordana Božinovska; 16 January 1965 (age 61); Samaila, SR Serbia, Yugoslavia
- Genres: Turbo-folk
- Occupation: Singer
- Label: Grand Production

Gordana Božinovska (Serbian Cyrillic: Гордана Божиновска; born 16 January 1965), better known as Goca Božinovska, is a Serbian singer. Born in the village of Samaila near Kraljevo, she began her career as a kafana singer on the Ibar Highway. Božinovska cited Šaban Šaulić as someone who helped her launch her career. Since her debut in 1984, Božinovska has released eight studio albums. Her best known songs include "Okovi" (1998) and "Neodoljivo" (2004).

She was a finalist on the 2013 season of the reality show Farma.

Božinovska was married to kick-boxer and alleged leader of Surčin Clan, Zoran Šijan, who was assassinated in 1999 under unresolved circumstances. She has three children.

== Discography ==
Studio albums

- Ti mi beše od zlata jabuka (1984)
- Ne idi (1987)
- Želim da me želiš (1989)
- Još sam jaka (1997)
- Okovi (1998)
- Goca Božinovska (2000)
- Goca Božinovska (2002)
- Neodoljivo (2004)

== See also ==
- Music of Serbia
- List of singers from Serbia
- Turbo-folk
