= Ekrem Jevrić =

Montenegrin-American singer and television personality

- Born: 25 October 1961; Plav, PR Montenegro, Yugoslavia
- Died: 4 March 2016 (aged 54); New York City, New York, U.S.
- Occupations: Singer, reality show star, building porter, cab driver
- Years active: 2010–2016
- Known for: Song "Kuća poso"
- Spouse: Igbala Jevrić
- Children: 4 sons

Ekrem Jevrić (Cyrillic: Екрем Јеврић, pronounced [ěkrem jěːʋritɕ]; born 25 October 1961 – 4 March 2016) was a Montenegrin American based in Yonkers, New York who became a singer and television personality. Recognized as an internet phenomenon by the BBC and The Independent, he rose to fame with his viral music video "Kuća poso" (House - Work) in 2010. The turbo-folk song, which has garnered over two million views during the first month and over 15 million overall, earned him instant popularity across former Yugoslavia.

== Biography ==
Ekrem Jevrić was born in Plav, SR Montenegro, Yugoslavia. He started smoking at age fourteen and his father refused to buy him cigarettes, so he went to Podgorica alone to earn money. After that he moved to Slovenia. In 1985, he married Igbala Jevrić. He then moved to Canada in 1988, but eventually settled in the United States, where he did low-paying jobs like working as cab driver. The couple has four sons: Enis, Verdin, Hajrudin and Berat.

Jevrić most famous song is "Kuća poso" (Home, work or From home to work) that parodied the day-to-day lives of ex-Yugoslav immigrants in the western world (especially North America). The song achieved instant success on YouTube, reaching over 16.0 million views (2 million in first month). He recorded his first album, titled Kuća posô in March 2010 He did a photo shoot for Dolce & Gabbana Winter 2011 Collection, positing as an Italian tailor.

At the end of 2010, he took part in the popular Serbian reality show Farma, and ended up third.

On 4 March 2016, Jevrić died in New York City from a heart attack while driving to work, at the age of 54.

== Television appearances ==
- Farma 3 (2010) - 3rd place
- Farma 4 (2013) - evicted
- Farma 5 (2013) - evicted
- Parovi 6 (2015/2016) - walked
