= Lepi Mića =

Bosnian Serb turbofolk singer-songwriter

- Лепи Мића
- Born: Miroslav Pržulj; 26 March 1959 (age 67); Sarajevo, PR Bosnia and Herzegovina, FPR Yugoslavia
- Occupation: Singer-songwriter
- Height: 1.83 m (6 ft 0 in)
- Musical career
- Years active: 1989–present
- Label: SuperTon

Miroslav Pržulj (Serbian Cyrillic: Мирослав Пржуљ; born 26 March 1959), better known as Lepi Mića (Serbian Cyrillic: Лепи Мића, lit. 'The Handsome Mića'), is a Bosnian Serb turbofolk singer-songwriter. Prior to his career, he had worked in a kafana in Sarajevo, where he met his future writer and Bosnian singer Nazif Glijva. He entered the music scene in 1989 with his album Рулет среће (Roulette of luck). However, he would soon move to Belgrade, where he got married. In 2013, he was invited to the fifth season of the RTV Pink reality show Farma, but later kicked off for hate speech. He was also invited to the seventh season, which he lost. In his songs, he often criticizes the Croatian and Bosnian governments. He has written nine albums, five of which pertained to the Yugoslav Wars or Serbian nationalism.

== Discography ==
- Rulet sreće (1989)
- Imao Sam Jednu Ljubav (1991)
- Republiko Srpska (1992)
- Srbima za sva vremena (1993)
- Pravoslavci (1993)
- Garo Moja (1994)
- Gdje cvjetaju božuri (1994)
- Ženo plave kose (1996)
- Svaka me zima na tebe sjeća (1998)
- Oj Srbijo, moja majko (2008)
- Četnički vojvoda Milan II Kuzmanović (2017)
