= Lepi (singer) =

Serbian singer

- Лепи
- Born: Redžep Redžepović; Zagreb, Croatia
- Occupation: Singer
- Years active: 2010

Redžep Redžepović, better known by his stage name Lepi, is a Serbian folk singer.

== Early life ==
Redžepović was born to a Muslim family in Zagreb. His family roots go back to Novi Pazar. His childhood was rough, his father worked in Zagreb and would frequently get drunk, causing his mother to return to Novi Pazar, after which she left him in the care of his grandparents. Lepi himself recalls only seeing his parents a few times. His grandmother died when he was nine, leaving his grandfather as his sole caretaker. As a child, he grew up rather poor. Lepi finished only elementary school, as he didn't have enough money to enroll in a high school. Looking for a better life, Lepi moved to Berlin. He spent his first few months there homeless, before getting a job as a mason. He became quite skilled at his job, working his way up the corporate ladder and eventually becoming a business owner and working on a German railway station. There, he got the idea for his first song Iza oblaka (2010).

== Career ==
Lepi started his singing career in 2010, with his debut song Iza oblaka. Since then, Lepi has also released other songs such as Mala and Pusti me (2010). His last song was Ratnik (2026). Recently, Lepi saw a resurgence in popularity, his comedic songs becoming popular in the Balkan meme community.

== Personal life ==
Lepi had lived in Germany for around 20 years, where he owned a building company. He married two Times, with his first wife being German. He had 3 children with three different women, one from each marriage. Despite divorce, Lepi has emphasised that he tries his best to be there for his children, fearing they would grow up like he did.
