= Lady Killer (1992 film) =

- Directed by: Zoran Calic
- Written by: Zoran Calic; Dragan Calic
- Starring: Velimir 'Bata' Zivojinovic; Boro Stjepanovic; Nikola-Kole Angelovski
- Cinematography: Dusko Filipovic
- Edited by: Dejan Lukovic
- Music by: Boris Bizetić
- Release date: 1992
- Running time: 67 minutes
- Country: Yugoslavia
- Language: Serbo-Croatian

Lady Killer (Serbo-Croatian: Дама која убија/Dama koja ubija) is a 1992 Yugoslavian film directed by Zoran Calic.

== Plot ==
Boki and Pajko, two police officers, embark on a mission to apprehend arms smugglers. To their dismay, their commander asserts that the smugglers are women infected with AIDS, further complicating their already challenging task.

== Cast ==
- Velimir 'Bata' Zivojinovic as Boki ( credited as Bata Zivojinovic)
- Boro Stjepanovic as Pajko
- Nikola-Kole Angelovski as Komandir milicije (credited as Kole Angelovski)
- Dragomir Bojanic-Gidra as Kornelone
- Snezana Savic as Silvija
- Nada Blam as Nada

== See also ==
- Lists of Yugoslav films
