= Samaila (Kraljevo) =

Samaila Самаила (Serbian)
- Village (Selo)
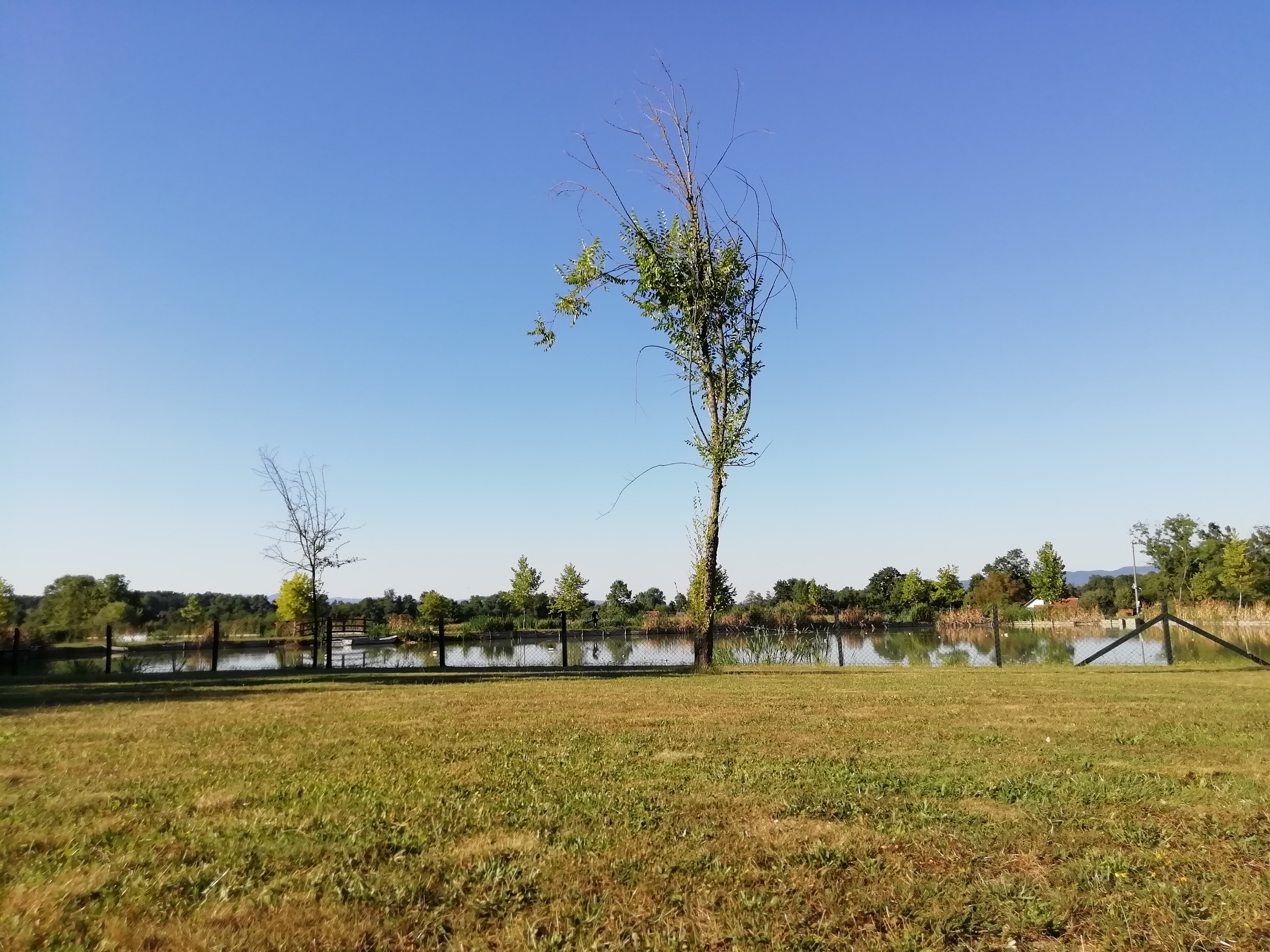
- View on Samaila Aqua Dreams fishing lake, August 2019

- Location of Samaila within Serbia
- Coordinates: 43°45′45″N 20°32′40″E
- Country: Serbia
- District: Raška District
- Municipality: Kraljevo

Area
  - Total: 23.40 km^{2} (9.03 sq mi)
- Elevation: 250 m (820 ft)

Population (2011)
  - Total: 1,466
  - Density: 62.65/km^{2} (162.3/sq mi)
- Time zone: UTC+1 (CET)
  - Summer (DST): UTC+2 (CEST)
- Postal code: 36202

Samaila is a village located in the city of Kraljevo. According to the 2011 census, the village has a population of 1,466 inhabitants.

== Gallery ==
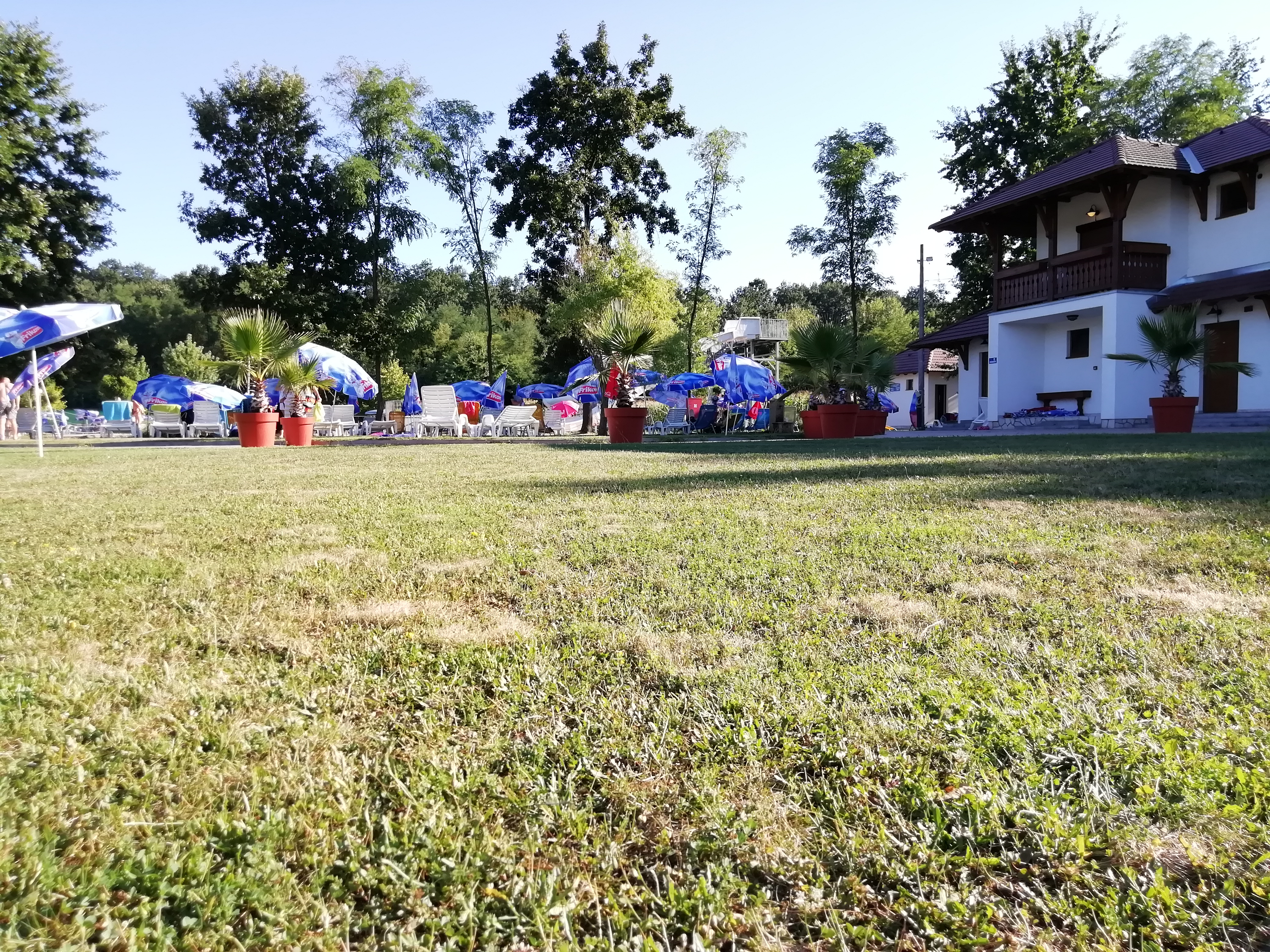
View on Samaila Aqua Dreams recreation center

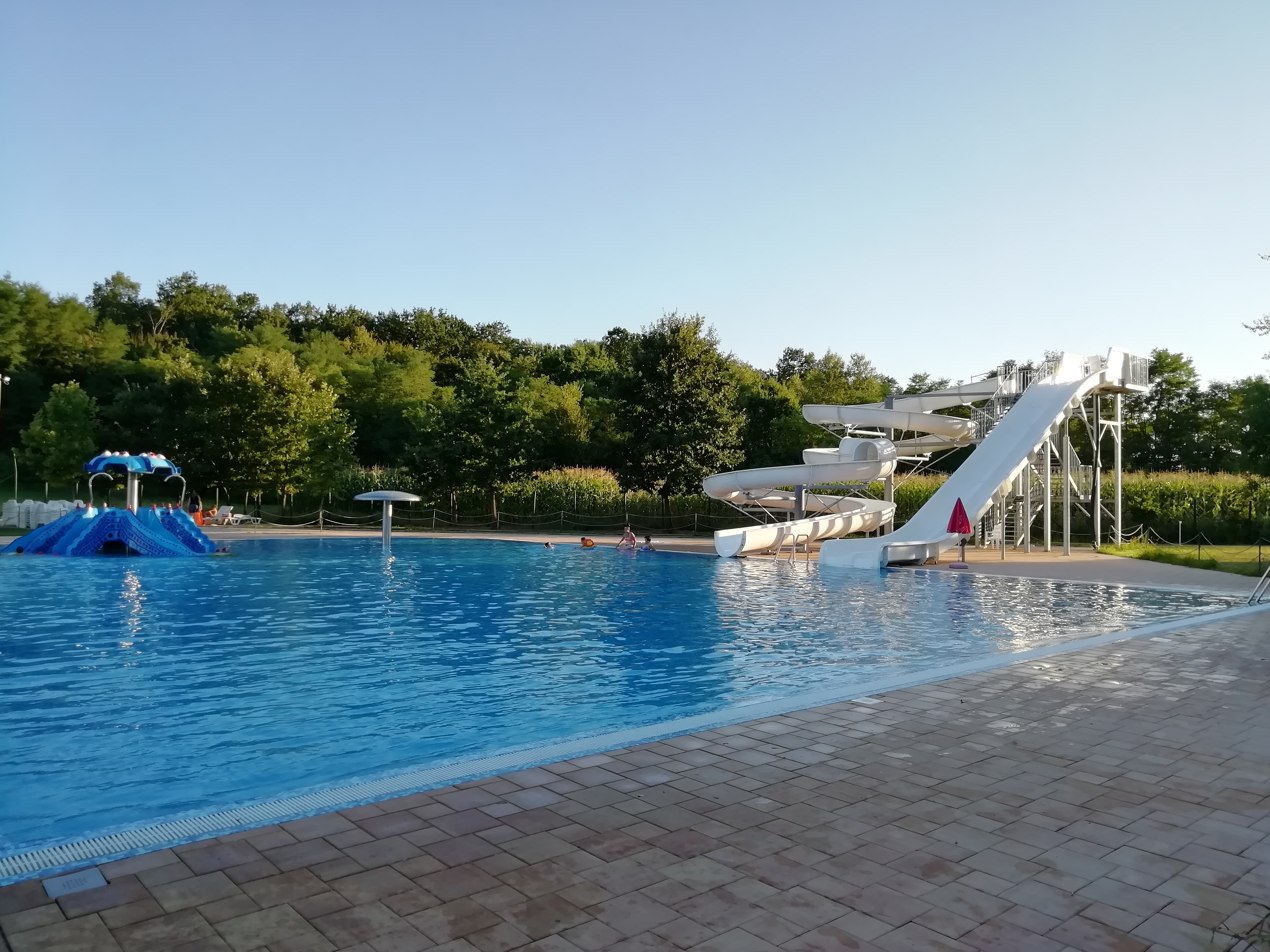
Samaila Aqua Dreams swimming pool

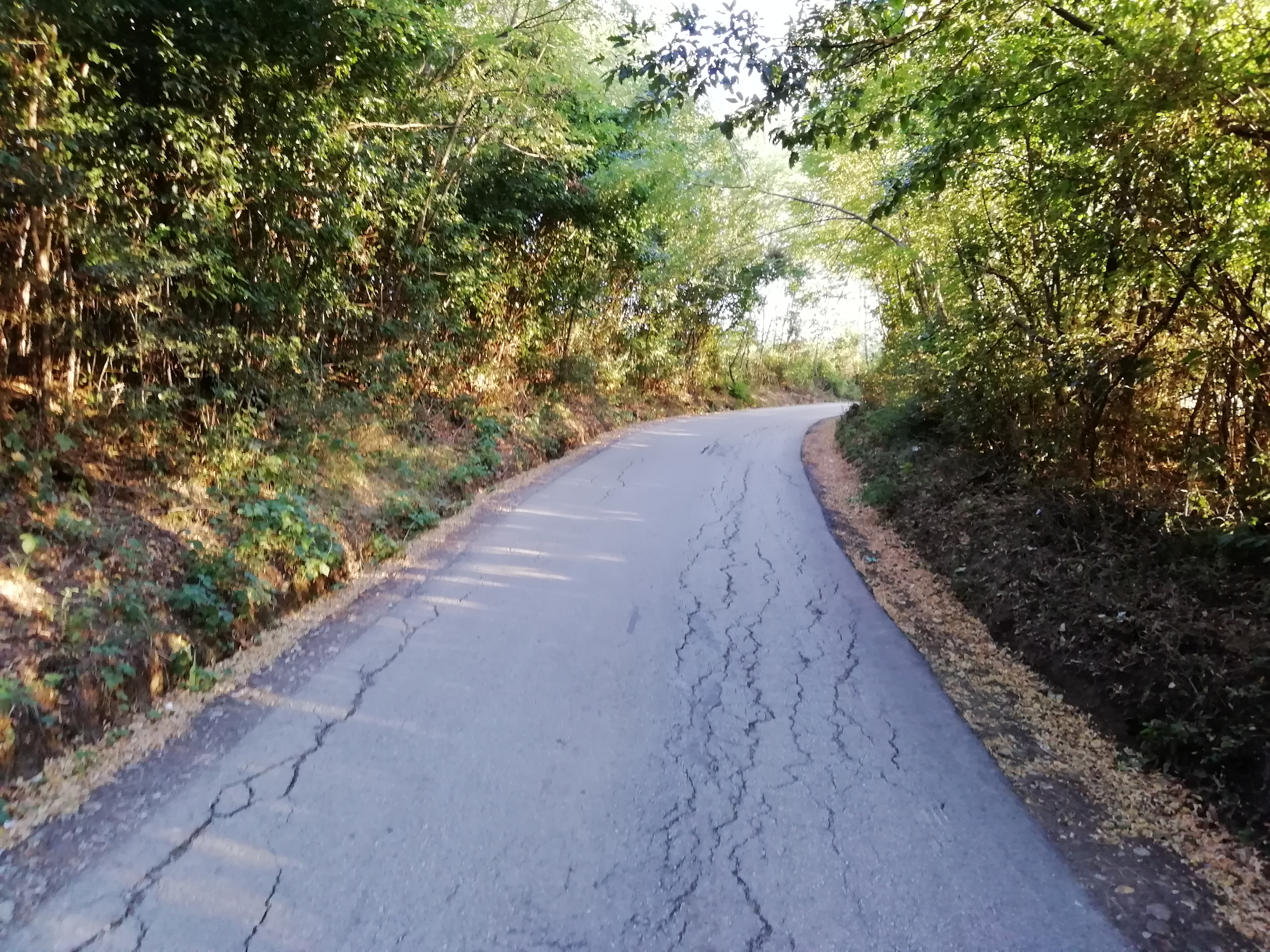
Village road in Samaila

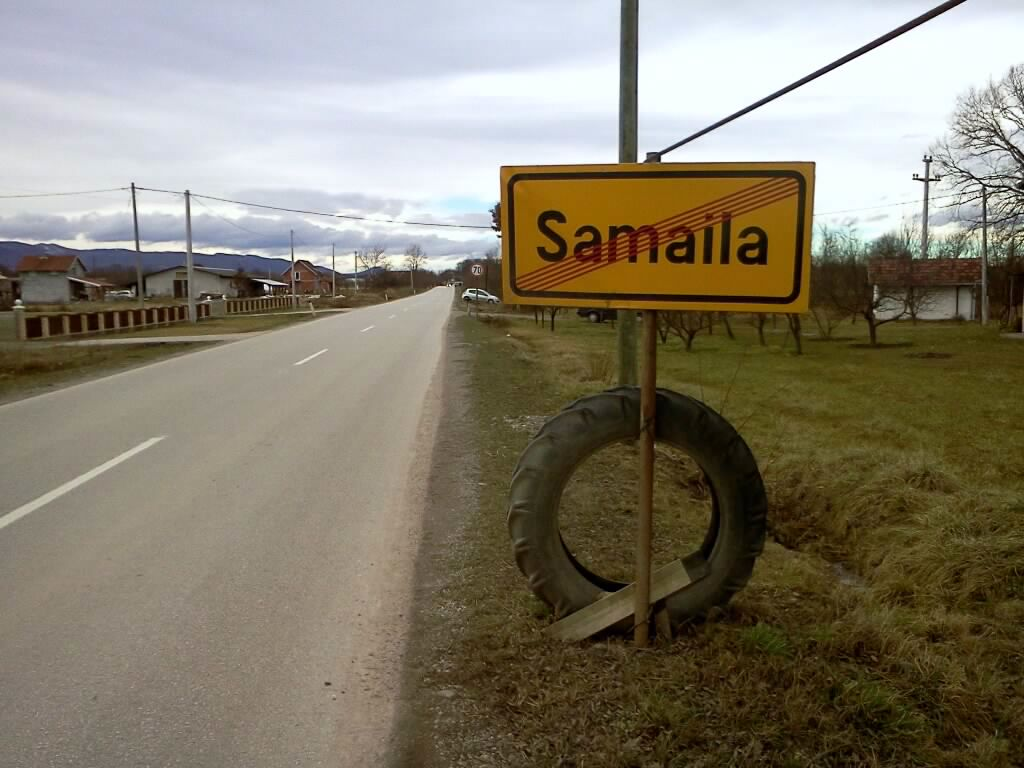
Exit road sign in Samaila

== Notable people ==
- Goca Božinovska, Serbian folk singer
