= Parovi =

Serbian reality TV show

- Genre: Reality TV series
- Created by: Predrag Ranković
- Presented by: Ana Marković (2010); Jelena Helc (2010–2012); Bojana Ristivojević (2015–2019); Ivan Ivanov (2014–2015); Miomira Dragičević (2015–2018); Predrag Damnjanović (2015–2016); Ivana Savić (2015–2016); Vladana Savović (2015–2016); Milomir Marić (2016); Jelena Petković (2016, 2018–2019, 2020-2021); Jelena Sekulović (2016); Jelena Dimitrijević (2016, 2020–2021); Zoran Radojković Pile (2016); Ava Karabatić (2016, 2019); Katarina Korša (2016–2017); Jovana Jeremić (2016–2018, 2019–2021); Anđela Lakićević (2016–2021); Boguljub Mitić (2017); Jovana Jelovac Cavnić (2018); Ružica Veljković (2017–2018); Vuk Đuričić (2018); Vesna Vukelić Vendi (2018–2020); Slađana Petrušić (2018–2019); Aleksandar Marković (2019); Nina Prlja (2019); Jelena Maćić (2019–2021); Zoran Pejović Peja (2019); Kristina Iglendža (2020–2021); Irena Jovanović (2020–2021)
- Country of origin: Serbia
- No. of series: 9

Production
- Running time: 24-hour

Original release
- Network: Happy
- Release: December 24, 2010

Parovi (English title: Couples) was a Serbian-based reality show created by Predrag Ranković. The show premiered on December 24, 2010 on Happy and immediately reached huge ratings. It also featured a 24-hour YouTube live streaming.

== Format ==
Originally the format built on that all contestants were real-life couples, but it was changed due to difficulties in looking for actual couples that may be part of the show. Over the next years there were castings and people with interesting histories were chosen to participate in the show. The house included everyday facilities such as a fully equipped kitchen, garden, bedroom, bathroom, additional rooms, big living room, pool and a secret room. The prize fund varied and went up to €250,000, but many times was a lot below, between €30,000 — €70,000.

=== Broadcasting ===
During the regular airing of earlier seasons, a daily and nightly show was broadcast on television. The Morning coffee (Jutarnja kafica) aired between 11 a.m. and 2 p.m., then the show would return at 3 p.m. until 5:30 p.m., while the evening show would begun at 7 p.m. until later night.

=== The house ===
The house was located in Belgrade, in the neighborhood of Zemun. The original house name is Vila Parova.

== Series overview ==
Season	Network	First aired	Last aired	Days	Winner	Prize
1	Happy TV	December 24, 2010	April 24, 2011	122	Miloš Vuković and Zorica Dukić	250,000€
2	Happy TV	December 24, 2011	April 7, 2012	106	Aleksandra Matić and Stevan Radivojević	100,000€
3	Happy TV	March 28, 2015	June 28, 2015	112	Gasttozz	40,000€
4	Happy TV	August 30, 2015	July 16, 2016	321	Ružica Veljković	30,000€
5	Happy TV	December 25, 2016	July 2, 2017	189	Dalila Dragojević	30,000€
6	Happy TV	September 16, 2017	July 8, 2018	295	Gasttozz	70,000€
7	Happy TV	August 26, 2018	July 13, 2019	321	Mladen Vuletić	30,000€
8	Happy TV	September 12, 2019	August 29, 2020	352	Ivania Bajić	30,000€
9	Happy TV	August 30, 2020	July 11, 2021	315	Nataša Pajović	20,000€

== See also ==
- Zadruga (TV series)
- Farma (Serbian TV series)
- Big Brother (Serbian TV series)
