= Nacionalna Televizija Happy =

Serbian television channel

- Type: Television channel (1998–present); Radio station (1994–2006)
- Branding: Happy
- Country: Serbia
- Availability: Worldwide
- Founded: July 22, 1994; 32 years ago Belgrade, Serbia
- Headquarters: Aleksandra Dubčeka 14; Belgrade
- Nation: Federal Republic of Yugoslavia 1994-2003 Serbia and Montenegro 2003-2006 Serbia
- Key people: Predrag Ranković (Chairperson); Milomir Marić (Editor-in-chief); Silvana Stanković (Director of communications)
- Launch date: Radio: July 22, 1994; 32 years ago; Television: August 22, 1998; 28 years ago
- Former names: Košava (1994—2010); Kanal 1 (2001)
- Picture format: 576i (16:9 SDTV)
- Official website: www.happytv.rs
- Language: Serbian

Nacionalna Televizija Happy (often shortened to Happy) is a privately owned TV channel in Serbia. Happy has gained a strong reputation for its entertainment programming. The station offers a compilation of international and domestic movies, American sitcoms, dramas, Indian soap operas and Latin telenovelas, as well as locally produced talk/variety shows.

Happy's parent company is the Belgrade-based Invej, which also owns many business entities that often serve as sponsors of the program, which is owned by Predrag Ranković.

== History ==
Happy was previously called Košava, the latter once owned by Marija Milošević, daughter of Slobodan Milošević, Serbia's authoritarian president in power during the 1990s. Marija Milošević sold her ownership in Kosava TV to lawyer Borivoj Pajović, who was at the time president of the board of directors in the daily newspaper Blic. On 11 May 1999, following the NATO bombings, Košava suspended all regular programming and started simulcast CCTV-4 around the clock.

After a couple of ownership changes, in 2006 the Regulatory Authority for Electronic Media issued Košava with a license for national coverage, which was shared with kids channel Happy – while Happy aired exclusively kids programming in the morning, Košava broadcast informative and current affairs programs in the evening. At that time, REM's (then RRA) decision was disputed since neither TV stations had the capacity for national broadcasting, unlike, for example, RTL which competed for a license but was not issued one.

In 2007, Predrag Ranković, known to the public for involvement in shady business deals, bought part of Košava, although his name was never mentioned in formal ownership documents. In 2010, Košava bought Happy, and Košava changed its name to Happy and started to broadcast as one program. The former kids channel Happy changed its name to Happy Kids, before closing in 2017.

== Programming ==
It broadcasts many international and domestic movies and TV series which have resulted in large viewership not only in Serbia but also in the Serbian diaspora where Happy TV is present.

Since its beginnings, Happy TV has made several reality shows (especially Parovi) in cooperation with Emotion Production, and as result of it they broadcast a local version of the internationally well-known Wife Swap, called Menjam ženu, which had been broadcast earlier on RTV Pink. They also made a Serbian version of Wheel of Fortune called Kolo sreće, and later show called Soba sreće.

=== Telenovelas, drama series and soap operas ===
Happy TV has broadcast many foreign telenovelas, drama series and soap operas, mainly from Latin America, Turkey and India.

- **bold** – currently airing
- ✓ – finished
- ✗ – cancelled

==== Serbian telenovelas ====
- Tajna nečiste krvi ✓
- Sudbine ✓
- Lepi i mrtvi ✓
- Jelena ✓
- Crni Gruja ✓

==== American dramas ====
- Life Unexpected ✓
- Beverly Hills, 90210 ✓
- The Good Wife ✗

==== Brazilian telenovelas ====
- O Clone (Zabranjena ljubav) ✓
- Cordel Encantado (Zavet ljubavi) ✗
- A Vida da Gente (Život teče dalje) ✓

==== Croatian telenovelas ====
- Bitange i princeze ✗

==== Italian dramas ====
- RIS Delitti Imperfetti ✗

==== Turkish drama series ====
- Iffet (Ifet) ✓
- Unutulmaz (Zaboravi ako možeš) ✓
- **Körduğüm** **(Kazna)**
- Elveda Derken (Suze Bosfora) ✗
- Sonbahar (Jesenje suze) ✗
- Beni Affet (Oprosti mi) ✓
- Hayat Şarkısı (Suze moje sestre) ✓
- Küçük Kadınlar (Sestre) ✓
- Valley of the Wolves (Dolina vukova) ✓
- Gönülçelen (Jesenje suze) ✗

==== Spanish telenovelas ====
- Águila Roja (Crveni orao) ✗

==== Latin American telenovelas ====
- Clase 406 (Izgubljene godine) ✗

==== Indian soap operas ====
- Madhubala – Ek Ishq Ek Junoon (Madhubala) ✗

==== Romanian telenovelas ====
- Daria, iubirea mea (Jedina ljubav) ✗
