= Zmijanac =

Zmijanac is a surname. Notable people with the surname include:

- Dragi Zmijanac (born 1960), Macedonian social worker
- Vesna Zmijanac (born 1957), Montenegrin-born Serbian singer
