= Dragi Zmijanac =

Macedonian social worker, humanitarian and children's rights activist

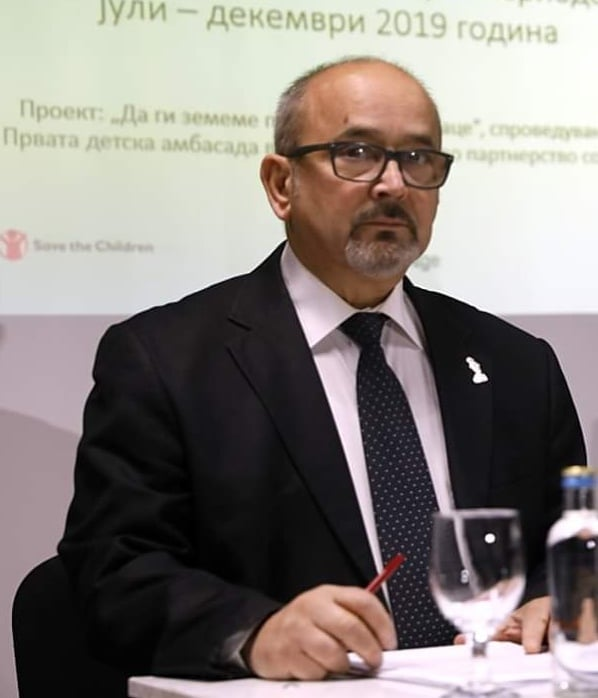
- Zmijanac, Founder and President of the First Children's Embassy in the World Megjashi
- Born: 25 February 1960; Skopje, SFR Yugoslavia (present-day North Macedonia)
- Occupation(s): Social worker, humanitarian, activist

Dragi Zmijanac (born 25 February 1960) is a Macedonian social worker, humanitarian and children's rights activist.

== Biography ==
Zmijanac was born in Skopje on 25 February 1960. In April 1992, he founded Megjashi, the first children's embassy in the world, which promotes and protects children's rights as well as provides support for child victims of violence and abuse.
