= Intime (Maya Berović album) =

Studio album by Maya Berović
- Released: 6 August 2020
- Recorded: 2019–20
- Studios: Studio Leona; Studio Imperia
- Genre: Pop-folk
- Length: 32:40
- Language: Serbian
- Labels: XL Elit; Leona

Maya Berović chronology
7 (2018)	Intime (2020)	Milion (2023)

Intime (transl. Intimacies) is an album by Bosnian-Serbian pop singer Maya Berović. It was published on 6 August 2020 for XL Elit Invest record label. The record contains ten pop-folk tracks with elements of electronic, europop, trap and dance music.

== Background ==
Two years have passed since the release of her previous album 7. Her new album consists of ten new songs and as many music videos. It took 365 days to visit Europe and South America to shoot all the music videos for the songs.

Thus, on the map of her music video shoots, she listed Serbia, Dominican Republic and Cologne, Germany and the largest "Pop-up" candy museum in the world where she shot a video for the song "Bonbon".

However, for the album's title song, she was the first in the Balkan region to make a video with a mobile device Huawei P40 Pro+, which turned out to be ideal, judging by the comments of the audience.

== Track listing ==
Digital edition
No.	Title	Lyrics	Music	Arrangement	Length
1.	"Intime"	Aleksandra Radović; Petar Šarenac	Radović; Šarenac	Nikki Caneras	3:09
2.	"Honey"	Radović; Šarenac	Radović; Šarenac	N. Caneras	3:15
3.	"Moto"	Radović; Šarenac	Radović; Šarenac	N. Caneras	3:20
4.	"Verna ko pas"	Radović; Šarenac	Radović; Šarenac	N. Caneras	2:40
5.	"Niko kao on"	Jasmin Fazlić; Amar Hodžić; Igor Buzov	Fazlić; Hodžić; Buzov	Baby It's Pablo; RimDa	3:34
6.	"Breme"	Radović; Šarenac	Radović; Šarenac	N. Caneras	3:00
7.	"Bonbon"	Radović; Šarenac	Radović; Šarenac	N. Caneras	3:30
8.	"Kunem se u nas"	Fazlić; Hodžić; Buzov	Fazlić; Hodžić; Buzov	Baby It's Pablo	3:20
9.	"La la la"	Radović; Šarenac	Radović; Šarenac	N. Caneras	3:05
10.	"Niko ne zna"	Fazlić; Hodžić; Buzov	Fazlić; Hodžić; Buzov	Baby It's Pablo	3:47
Total length:					32:40

CD and memory stick editions
No.	Title	Lyrics	Music	Arrangement	Length
11.	"Uloga"	Fazlić; Hodžić; Buzov	Fazlić; Hodžić; Buzov	Baby It's Pablo; RimDa	3:32
12.	"Zmaj"	Fazlić	Fazlić	Baby It's Pablo	3:34
Total length:					39:46

== Charts ==
Chart performance for Intime
Chart (2020)	Peak position
Austrian Albums (Ö3 Austria)	12
Swiss Albums (Schweizer Hitparade)	30

== Release history ==
Country	Date	Format	Label
Worldwide	7 August 2020	digital download; streaming	Leona; XL Elite Invest
Europe	October 2020	CD	Leona; XL Elite Invest
Serbia	October 2020	Memory Stick	Leona; XL Elite Invest
