= GOAT Tour Jala Brat & Buba Corelli =

2025–2027 concert tour by Jala Brat and Buba Corelli

GOAT Tour
- Tour by Jala Brat and Buba Corelli
- Location: Serbia; Croatia; North Macedonia; Bosnia and Herzegovina; Germany; Switzerland; Sweden; Austria
- Start date: June 25, 2025
- End date: 2027
- No. of shows: 17+
- Producer: Sky Music / Music Week Concerts

The GOAT Tour is a concert tour by Bosnian hip-hop and rap duo Jala Brat and Buba Corelli. The tour is organized by the production company Sky Music under the Music Week Concerts brand, and it includes performances in large halls, arenas, and open-air festival stages across the Balkans, Western, and Northern Europe. The tour officially begins with a large concert in Belgrade at Ušće on June 30, 2025.

== Setlist ==
The following list represents the official repertoire of songs performed during the tour:

#	Song	Artists / Guest artists
1	"Toronto"	Jala Brat & Buba Corelli
2	"Bass"	Jala Brat & Buba Corelli
3	"Padam"	Jala Brat, Buba Corelli & Baby It's Pablo
4	"Military"	Jala Brat & Buba Corelli
5	"99"	Jala Brat (solo)
6	"Balenciaga"	Buba Corelli (solo)
7	"BLAKA BLAKA"	Jala Brat, Buba Corelli & Elena
8	"Mafia"	Jala Brat & Buba Corelli
9	"Pilula"	Jala Brat & Buba Corelli
10	"Nema Bolje"	Jala Brat, Buba Corelli & RAF Camora
11	"Kehlani"	Jala Brat & Buba Corelli
12	"Coco"	Jala Brat & Buba Corelli
13	"Zove Vienna"	Jala Brat, Buba Corelli & RAF Camora
14	"Tec-9"	Jala Brat & Buba Corelli
15	"Roze Suze"	Jala Brat & Buba Corelli
16	"Pleši"	Jala Brat & Buba Corelli
17	"SEXDRIVE"	Jala Brat & Buba Corelli
18	"Macje Oci"	Jala Brat & Buba Corelli
19	"Babylon"	Jala Brat & Buba Corelli
20	"Monster"	Jala Brat & Buba Corelli
21	"Rosalia"	Jala Brat & Buba Corelli
22	"Blokada"	Jala Brat & Buba Corelli
23	"Opasno"	Buba Corelli (solo)
24	"Mlada i Luda"	Jala Brat (solo)
25	"Irina Shayk"	Buba Corelli (solo)
26	"Mufasa"	Jala Brat, Buba Corelli & Rasta
27	"Gluh i Nijem"	Buba Corelli (solo)
28	"Roze"	Jala Brat, Buba Corelli & Devito
29	"Karamela"	Jala Brat, Buba Corelli & Devito
30	"Vajbuje"	Jala Brat, Buba Corelli & Devito
31	"Bez Koda"	Jala Brat & Buba Corelli
32	"Bass & Rave"	Jala Brat & Buba Corelli
33	"Topovska"	Buba Corelli (solo)
34	"Ajkula"	Jala Brat (solo)
35	"Hollywood"	Jala Brat, Buba Corelli & Rasta
36	"Kamikaza"	Jala Brat, Buba Corelli & Senidah
37	"Partijam"	Jala Brat (solo)
38	"Vampiri"	Jala Brat & Buba Corelli
39	"6 Ujutru"	Jala Brat, Buba Corelli & Teodora Džehverović
40	"101 Zmija"	Teodora Džehverović & Jala Brat
41	"Dale"	Jala Brat, Buba Corelli & Hava
42	"Godzilla"	Jala Brat & Buba Corelli
43	"Bebi"	Jala Brat & Buba Corelli
44	"Divljam"	Jala Brat, Buba Corelli & Coby
45	"Ona'e"	Jala Brat, Buba Corelli & Coby
46	"Klinka"	Jala Brat & Buba Corelli

== Tour dates ==
Date	City	Country	Venue	Capacity
2025
June 30, 2025	Belgrade	Serbia	Ušće Park	40,000+
November 28, 2025	Skopje	North Macedonia	Jane Sandanski Arena	6,000
November 29, 2025	Skopje	North Macedonia	Jane Sandanski Arena	6,000
December 13, 2025	Ludwigsburg	Germany	Arena Ludwigsburg	7,000
2026
February 7, 2026	Düsseldorf	Germany	Mitsubishi Electric Halle	7,500
March 21, 2026	Zurich	Switzerland	The Hall	5,000
May 8, 2026	Zagreb	Croatia	Arena Zagreb	18,000
May 9, 2026	Zagreb	Croatia	Arena Zagreb	18,000
June 25, 2026	Belgrade	Serbia	Ušće Park	40,000+
July 31, 2026	Ohrid	North Macedonia	Egoist Summer Stage	3,000
September 25, 2026	Osijek	Croatia	Gradski vrt Hall	3,500
October 3, 2026	Ljubljana	Slovenia	Stožice Arena	12,000
October 9, 2026	Tuzla	Bosnia and Herzegovina	Mejdan Hall	8,000
October 10, 2026	Tuzla	Bosnia and Herzegovina	Mejdan Hall	8,000
October 31, 2026	Helsingborg	Sweden	Helsingborg Arena	5,000
November 6, 2026	Vienna	Austria	Multiversum Arena	3,000
November 7, 2026	Vienna	Austria	Multiversum Arena	3,000
November 14, 2026	Zurich	Switzerland	Face club	1,000
2027
2027	Sarajevo	Bosnia and Herzegovina	TBA	—
