= Pink Music Festival 2014 =

Serbian music competition

Pink Music Festival 2014 was the first edition of the Pink Music Festival contest organised by Serbian broadcaster RTV Pink and featuring artists from City Records. It was held in the RTV Pink studio in Šimanovci on the outskirts of Belgrade on 28 and 29 April 2014 and broadcast live on RTV Pink. All songs were mimed, which was much-criticised by the Serbian press.

== Preparation ==
The contest was announced on 7 March 2014, and artists had a one-month window to submit songs before the deadline of 12pm on 6 April 2014. From the 700–800 songs submitted, the final lineup of 26 songs was chosen by a four-member selection committee comprising Željko Mitrović (director and editor-in-chief of RTV Pink), Milica Mitrović (RTV Pink programming executive), Darko Popović (RTV Pink PR manager) and Bane Stojanović (head of City Records). The list of entries was announced on 10 April, and the running order for the semi-final was drawn live on Pink TV on 12 April. Performances of the entries were filmed in the RTV Pink studio and published on YouTube on 16 April.

== Format ==
The contest was split over 2 nights, with the semi-final being held on 28 April 2014 and the final on 29 April. The results of the semi-final were decided entirely by SMS voting, with the 10 songs that received the fewest votes being eliminated. Rather than a combined jury-televote system as in Eurovision since 2010, the final featured a separate Public Award (for the song with the most SMS votes) and Jury Award (for the song ranked highest by the jury), as well as an Artists' Award voted for by the competing singers, a Sponsors' Award chosen by the event's sponsors, and a YouTube Award for the song with the most YouTube views.

== Entries ==
Performer	Song	Composers
Goca Tržan	"Gluve usne"	Bane Opačić (music/lyrics); Dušan Alagić (arrangement)
Marina Visković	"Paralizuj me"	Damir Handanović (music/arrangement); Marina Tucaković (lyrics)
Romana Panić	"Titula"	Damir Handanović (music/arrangement); Marina Tucaković (lyrics)
Neda Ukraden	"Svaka druga"	Dušan Bačić (lyrics/arrangement); Bojan Dragojević (music)
Lexington Band	"Godinama"	Bane Opačić (music/lyrics); Alek Aleksov (arrangement)
Marko Mandić	"Keva"	Marko Mandić (music/lyrics); Nemanja Filipović (music/arrangement)
Anabela Atijas	"Muzej promašenih ljubavi"	Uzi (music); Konte (lyrics); Marko Drežnjak (arrangement)
Viki Miljković	"Flaster na usta"	Tonči Huljić (music); Vjekoslava Huljić (lyrics); Dragan Tašković Taške/Boris Krstajić (arrangement)
Dado Polumenta feat. DJ Denial X & MC Mikelly	"Revolucija"	Dado Polumenta (music/lyrics); Denial Islamčević (arrangement)
Dženan Lončarević	"Ovo je moj grad"	Srđan Simić Kamba (music); Miloš Roganović (lyrics); Emir Zukić/Dušan Alagić (arrangement)
Maya Berović	"Alkohol"	Damir Handanović (music/arrangement); Marina Tucaković (lyrics)
Željko Samardžić	"Duša"	Dragan Brajović Braja (lyrics/arrangement); Dejan Abadić (music)
Danijela Vranić	"Povuci reč"	Leontina Vukomanović (music/lyrics); Aleksandar Kobac (arrangement)
Jelena Jovanović	"Heroj"	Bane Opačić (music/lyrics); Dušan Alagić (arrangement)
Tropico Band	"Pusti ritam"	Dragan Brajović Braja (music/lyrics); Mirko Gavrić/Marko Tropiko (arrangement)
Milena Ćeranić feat. DJ Kizami & DJ Marchez	"Luda balkanska"	Filip Miletić/Miloš Roganović (music/lyrics/arrangement); Gane Medo (music/lyrics); Nenad Aleksić Sha (lyrics); Kizami/Marchez (а)
Goga Sekulić	"Rekord sam oborila"	Damir Handanović (music/arrangement); Marina Tucaković (lyrics)
Milan Stanković	"Luda ženo"	Damir Handanović (music/arrangement); Marina Tucaković (lyrics)
In Vivo	"Marina"	Neven Živančević/Igor Maljukanović (music/lyrics/arrangement)
OK Band	"Zašto bih se vratio"	Dragan Brajović Braja (music/lyrics); Dejan Abadić (arrangement)
W-Ice feat. Blek Panters	"Оna je bomba"	Danimir Vajs (music/lyrics/arrangement); Peđa Mihailović (arrangement)
Šako Polumenta	"Otisak prsta"	Branislav Samardžić (lyrics); Zoran Kostić Zoksi (music/arrangement)
Željko Šašić	"Doviđenja"	Vladimir Graić (music/arrangement); Leontina Vukomanović (lyrics)
Кnez	"Donna"	Dragan Brajović Braja (music/lyrics); Sky Wikluh (arrangement)
Adil	"Prosjak i kralj"	Bane Opačić (music/lyrics); Ognjan Radivojević (arrangement)
Ledeni Kvas Band	"Kvas kvas baby"	Filip Pat/Vladimir Preradović/Marko Đurašević Mahoni (music/lyrics/arrangement)

== Semi-final ==
The semi-final was held on 28 April. Viewers could vote by SMS from the start of the show, and the 16 qualifiers to the final were decided entirely by the public vote.

Draw	Performer	Song
1	Dado Polumenta feat DJ Denial X & MC Mikelly	"Revolucija"
2	Marko Mandić	"Keva"
3	Šako Polumenta	"Otisak prsta"
4	OK Band	"Zašto bih se vratio"
5	Romana Panić	"Titula"
6	Lexington Band	"Godinama"
7	In Vivo	"Marina"
8	Dženan Lončarević	"Ovo je moj grad"
9	W-Ice feat. Blek Panters	"Ona je bomba"
10	Marina Visković	"Paralizuj me"
11	Željko Šašić	"Doviđenja"
12	Adil	"Prosjak i kralj"
13	Željko Samardžić	"Duša"
14	Neda Ukraden	"Svaka Druga"
15	Viki Miljković	"Flaster na usta"
16	Maya Berović	"Alkohol"
17	Tropico Band	"Pusti ritam"
18	Goga Sekulić	"Rekord sam oborila"
19	Milan Stanković	"Luda ženo"
20	Jelena Jovanović	"Heroj"
21	Milena Ćeranić feat. DJ Kizami & DJ Marchez	"Luda balkanska"
22	Danileja Vranić	"Povuci reč"
23	Knez	"Donna"
24	Goca Tržan	"Gluve usne"
25	Anabela Đogani	"Muzej promašenih ljubavi"
26	Ledeni Kvas Band	"Kvas kvas baby"

== Final ==
The final was held on 29 April in the RTV Pink studio in Šimanovci. Artists including Ceca, Dragana Mirkovic, Zeljko Joksimovic, Jelena Rozga and Aca Lukas performed in the interval.

The jury in the final comprised 10 journalists and entertainment executives:

1. Ivan Vuković, editor-in-chief of Skandal magazine
2. Tamara Drača, journalist for Star magazine
3. Aleksandar Jovanović, editor of Telegraf online portal
4. Ivona Palada Višnjić, journalist for Informer daily newspaper
5. Sandra Rilak, journalist for Kurir daily newspaper
6. Ljubica Arsenović, press, Radio S
7. Danijela Petrović, press, DM SAT
8. Srdjan Milovanović, owner of TV KCN Kopernikus
9. Raka Marić, entertainment executive
10. Bane Obradović, entertainment executive

Place	Performer	Song	Draw	1	2	3	4	5	6	7	8	9	10	Поени
11	Dado Polumenta feat DJ Denial X & MC Mikelly	"Revolucija"	1	2	3		6					5	9	25
13	Šako Polumenta	"Otisak prsta"	2	3	4		7	2		1				17
4	Lexington Band	"Godinama"	3	4		10	3	10	3	4	6	3	3	46
15	In Vivo	"Marina"	4				4		2					6
8	Dženan Lončarević	"Ovo je moj grad"	5	6	5	1	2	9	1	3	5		6	38
10	Marina Visković	"Paralizuj me"	6	10	9	8					1	2		30
2	Željko Šašić	"Doviđenja"	7	8	7	9	1	3	10	10	8	4		60
3	Adil	"Prosjak i kralj"	8	9	8	7		6		7	10			47
6	Željko Samardžić	"Duša"	9	7	6		9	8	4	5	4		1	44
1	Viki Miljković	"Flaster na usta"	10	5	10	5	10	4	7	9	7	8	8	73
12	Maya Berović	"Alkohol"	11		1	2	8	1	5		2	1	4	24
4	Tropico Bend	"Pusti ritam"	12		2	6		7	6	8	9	6	2	46
8	Goga Sekulić	"Rekord sam oborila"	13	1		4	5		8			10	10	38
7	Milan Stanković	"Luda ženo"	14					5	9	6	3	9	7	39
13	Anabela Đogani	"Muzej promašenih ljubavi"	15			3				2		7	5	17
—N/a	Ledeni Kvas Band	"Kvas kvas baby"	16	—N/a	—N/a	—N/a	—N/a	—N/a	—N/a	—N/a	—N/a	—N/a	—N/a	—N/a

=== Artists' Award voting ===
Performer	Round 1	Round 2*
Dado Polumenta	Šako Polumenta	Мarina Visković
Šako Polumenta	Viki Miljković	/
Lexington Band	Dženan Lončarević	Željko Samardžić
In Vivo	Мarina Visković	Мarina Visković
Dženan Lončarević	Lexington Band	Мarina Visković
Мarina Visković	Goga Sekulić	Željko Samardžić
Željko Šašić	Tropico Band	Мarina Visković
Adil	Željko Samardžić	Мarina Visković
Željko Samardžić	Tropico Band	Tropico Band
Viki Miljković	Dado Polumenta	Мarina Visković
Maya Berović	Milan Stanković	Мarina Visković
Tropico Band	Željko Samardžić	Željko Samardžić
Goga Sekulić	Мarina Visković	Мarina Visković
Milan Stanković	Maya Berović	Željko Samardžić
Anabela Đogani	Željko Šašić	Tropico Band

*After the first round of voting, there was a tie between Tropico Band, Željko Samardžic and Marina Visković, so a second round followed in which each contestant voted for one of the three.

== Winners ==
Special annual awards for long-term partners of RTV Pink and City Records
Golden Disc	Miligram (for their bestselling album)
Golden Disc	Jelena Rozga
Golden Disc	Dragana Mirković (in recognition of her 30-year singing career)
Golden Gramophone	Željko Samardžić
Golden Gramophone	Željko Joksimović
Golden Gramophone	Aca Lukas
Golden Gramophone	Ceca (for the bestselling album and best concert of 2013)

Winners
Jury Award (voted for by the jury)	Viki Miljković
Sponsors' Award (voted for by the event sponsors)	Dženan Lončarević
Sponsors' Award (voted for by the event sponsors)	Adil
Sponsors' Award (voted for by the event sponsors)	Lexington Band
YouTube Award (for the most YouTube views)	Milan Stanković
Artists' Award (voted for by the competing artists)	Мarina Visković
Public Award (for the most SMS votes)	Milan Stanković
