= Opasne vode =

Studio album by Maya Berović
- Released: 27 October 2014
- Recorded: 2013–14
- Genre: Pop-folk
- Language: Bosnian
- Label: City Records; DH Music
- Producer: Damir Handanović

Maya Berović chronology
Djevojka sa juga (2012)	Opasne vode (2014)	Viktorijina tajna (2017)

Opasne vode (English: Dangerous Waters) is the fifth studio album by Bosnian-Serbian recording artist Maya Berović, released on 27 October 2014 through City Records. The record, containing nine pop-folk songs, was written by Marina Tucaković and Damir Handanović. It was produced by Handanović as well. This was last album Berović recorded in Bosnian.

The club-oriented "Alkohol" (Alcohol) was Maya's entry at the 2014 Pink Music Festival. The second song from the album, "Čime me drogiraš", had a premier on the popular late-night talk show Ami G Show hosted by Ognjen Amidžić in September 2014. Other songs were uploaded to YouTube alongside visuals directed by Dejan Milićević.

== Track listing ==
All lyrics written by Marina Tucaković and all music composed and arranged by Damir Handanović.

Opasne vode
No.	Title	Length
1.	"Voljela sam te k'o majka" (I Loved You Like a Mother)	3:39
2.	"Javi šta ti je u glavi" (Say What Is On Your Mind)	3:08
3.	"Opasne vode" (Dangerous Waters)	2:48
4.	"Ti si groznica" (You Are a Fever)	2:68
5.	"Dečko za provod" (Boy for Fun)	3:06
6.	"Vino od prošle godine" (Wine from Last Year)	3:05
7.	"Čime me drogiraš" (What Are You Drugging Me With)	3:06
8.	"Alkohol" (Alcohol)	3:54
9.	"Okolo ludilo kruži" (Madness Is Spreading Around)	2:56

== Release history ==
Country	Date	Format	Label
Serbia	October 27, 2014	CD; digital download; streaming	City Records
