= Virus (Dado Polumenta album) =

Album by Dado Polumenta

Studio album by Dado Polumenta
- Released: 25 December 2011
- Recorded: 2011: Belgrade, Serbia
- Genre: dance-pop; pop folk
- Label: Grand Production
- Producer: Dado Polumenta; Senad Bislimi

Dado Polumenta chronology
Buntovnik (2010)	Virus (2011)	Ne dam ja na tebe (2013)

Singles from Virus
- 1. "Hipnotisan" Released: 3 July 2011; 2. "Parti manijak" Released: 2011

Virus is the sixth studio album by Montenegrin dance-pop recording artist Dado Polumenta. It was released 25 December 2011 through the record label Grand Production.

== Background ==
Virus is Polumenta's third album under the label Grand Production. The song "Ženim se" is a duet with his uncle Šako Polumenta.

== Release ==
Some of the people present at the Virus listening party in February 2012 were Dara Bubamara, Goga Sekulić, Mile Kitić, Šako Polumenta, Dejan Matić, Jovan Perišić, and rappers Cvija, MC Stojan, MC Janko and Juice, among others.

== Track listing ==
1. Virus
2. Esma
3. Hipnotisan
4. Večeras
5. Ti nisi prava žena
6. Balkan
7. Ženim se
8. Parti manijak
9. Ko zna gdje si (Pos Na To Exigiso)
