= Noć za nas =

Single by Cvija feat. Dara Bubamara
- Released: 1 December 2011
- Genre: Pop; Folk
- Length: 3:45
- Label: Self-release
- Songwriter(s): Stefan Cvijović Cvija
- Producer(s): IDJVideos™

Cvija singles chronology
"Više nema te" (2011)	"Noć za nas" (2011)	"Volim to što radiš" (2012)

Dara Bubamara singles chronology
"Galama" (2011)	"Noć za nas" (2011)	"Pogledom te skidam" (2012)

"Noć za nas (A night for us)" is a song recorded by Serbian pop recording artist Dara Bubamara and rap artist Stefan Cvijović Cvija. It was self-released 1 December 2011, Cvija self-released. The song was written by Stefan Cvijović Cvija. It was produced and recorded in Belgrade.

== Other versions ==
- Bulgarian singer Malina made a Bulgarian version of song named "Amneziya (Amnesia)" and released it in 2014. The song doesn't contain a rap part which is sung by Cvija in Serbian version.
