= Pravo Vreme Tour =

2018–19 concert tour by Maya Berović

- Tour by Maya Berović
- Promotional poster for concert in Belgrade at Štark Arena, November 2018
- Location: Europe
- Associated album: 7
- Start date: 2 November 2018
- End date: 7 December 2019
- Legs: 1
- No. of shows: Total 25

Maya Berović concert chronology
- Viktorijina tajna Tour (2017–18); Pravo Vreme Tour (2018–19)

Pravo Vreme Tour was the second headlining and debut arena concert tour by Bosnian-Serbian singer Maya Berović, launched in support of her seventh studio album 7 (2018). It began on 2 November 2018, in Belgrade, at Štark Arena and concluded on 7 December 2019, in Innsbruck, at Innsbruck Music Hall.

== Background ==
In July 2018, Maya released her seventh studio album 7. It was her second collaborative effort with Bosnian rappers Jala Brat and Buba Corelli (the first one being Viktorijina tajna (2017)). In support of the album, she announced a large regional tour of arenas, with a large production and team line-up. The tour started in Belgrade, Serbia at Štark Arena, and continued to visit other big cities in Southeast European countries.

== Set list ==
This setlist was obtained from the concert of 2 November 2018 held at Belgrade Arena. It does not represent all shows throughout the tour.

1. Harem
2. Alkohol
3. Mama, mama
4. Ruski rulet
5. Neka stvar
6. Načisto
7. Javi šta ti je u glavi
8. Dečko za provod
9. Nisam normalna
10. Sahara
11. Pauza
12. Ledena kraljica
13. Legalna (feat. Leon)
14. Broj
15. To me radi (feat. Jala Brat & Buba Corelli)
16. Mala lomi (feat. Jala Brat & Buba Corelli)
17. Balmain (feat. Jala Brat & Buba Corelli)
18. Pravo vreme (feat. Buba Corelli)
19. Zora
20. Ljubomora
21. Proleće
22. Djevojačko prezime
23. Čime me drogiraš
24. Izvini tata
25. Djevojka sa juga
26. Voljela sam te ko majka
27. Jedan pravi
28. Crno zlato
29. Dilajla
30. Harem (reprise)

== Tour dates ==
List of concerts, showing date, city, country and venue
Date	City	Country	Venue
Europe
2 November 2018	Belgrade	Serbia	Štark Arena
21 December 2018	Novi Sad	Serbia	SPENS
10 January 2019	Niš	Serbia	Čair Sports Center
14 February 2019	Šabac	Serbia	Zorka Hall
16 February 2019	Vienna	Austria	Admiral Dome
7 March 2019	Kraljevo	Serbia	Kraljevo Sports Hall
8 March 2019	Užice	Serbia	Veliki Park Hall
23 March 2019	Sarajevo	Bosnia and Herzegovina	Skenderija
30 March 2019	Split	Croatia	Spaladium Arena
21 April 2019	Tuzla	Bosnia and Herzegovina	Mejdan Hall
22 April 2019	Nuremberg	Germany	Club Avenue
17 May 2019	Sombor	Serbia	Mostonga Hall
2 June 2019	Munich	Germany	VIP Club
15 June 2019	Zürich	Switzerland	Face Club
26 July 2019	Banja Luka	Bosnia and Herzegovina	Kastel Fortress
31 July 2019	Ohrid	North Macedonia	Stadium Biljanini Izvori
1 August 2019	Budva	Montenegro	Top Hill
5 August 2019	Valjevo	Serbia	Culture Center Valjevo
8 August 2019	Bijeljina	Bosnia and Herzegovina	Bijeljina Square
11 August 2019	Budva	Montenegro	Top Hill
12 August 2019	Düsseldorf	Germany	Kö Club
27 August 2019 (Note: The concert was part of 2019 Belgrade Music Week.)	Belgrade	Serbia	Ušće Park
11 October 2019 (Note: The concert was previously scheduled for 14 June 2019, but due to unknown reasons it was postponed to 11 October from its original June date.)	Ljubljana	Slovenia	Exhibition and Convention Center
1 November 2019	Celje	Slovenia	Golovec Hall
7 December 2019	Innsbruck	Austria	Innsbruck Music Hall

=== Box office score data ===
Venue	City	Tickets Sold
Štark Arena	Belgrade	22,000
SPENS	Novi Sad	10,000
Čair Sports Center	Niš	6,000
Zorka Hall	Šabac	3,000
Admiral Dome	Vienna	unknown
Kraljevo Sports Hall	Kraljevo	5,000
Veliki Park Hall	Užice	3,000
Skenderija	Sarajevo	10,000
Spaladium Arena	Split	3,000
Mejdan Hall	Tuzla	5,000
Kastel Fortress	Banja Luka	10,000
Top Hill	Budva	5,000
Culture Center Valjevo	Valjevo	18,000
Bijeljina Square	Bijeljina	15,000
Top Hill	Budva	5,000
TOTAL		120,000

== Cancelled shows ==
List of cancelled concerts, showing date, city, country, venue and reason for cancellation
Date	City	Country	Venue	Reason
14 June 2019	Ljubljana	Slovenia	Exhibition and Convention Center	Unknown (the concert was postponed to 11 October of the same year)
