= 7 (Maya Berović album) =

Studio album by Maya Berović
- Released: 8 July 2018
- Recorded: 2017–18
- Genre: Pop-folk
- Length: 29:06
- Language: Serbian
- Label: Spinnup; Imperia
- Producer: Jala Brat; Buba Corelli

Maya Berović chronology
Viktorijina tajna (2017)	7 (2018)	Intime (2020)

7 (pronounced as "seven") is the seventh studio album by Bosnian recording artist Maya Berović and her second collaborative effort with rappers Jala Brat and Buba Corelli, released on July 8, 2018. The record contains nine pop-folk tracks with elements of dancehall, reggaeton and trap music.

Following the release of the album, Berović embarked on a regional tour called Pravo vreme (Right Time) after her duet with Buba Corelli. The first show was held in the Belgrade Arena on November 2.

== Track listing ==
All tracks are written by Jasmin Fazlić and Amar Hodžić

7
No.	Title	Length
1.	"Sama" (By Myself)	3:16
2.	"Načisto" (Clear)	3:00
3.	"Zora" (Dawn)	3:07
4.	"Ljubomora" (Jealousy)	3:04
5.	"Sahara" (Sahara)	3:09
6.	"Pravo vreme" (Right Time) (featuring Buba Corelli)	3:04
7.	"Dilajla" (Lunatic)	3:08
8.	"Neka stvar" (A Certain Thing)	3:23
9.	"V.I.P." (V.I.P.) (featuring Jala Brat)	3:22

== Pravo Vreme Tour ==
In support of the album, the singer enbreak on Pravo Vreme Tour. The tour began on 2 November 2018, in Belgrade, at Štark Arena and concluded on 7 December 2019, in Innsbruck, at Innsbruck Music Hall.

== Release history ==
Country	Date	Format	Label
Serbia	July 8, 2018	CD; digital download; streaming	Spinnup; XL Elite Invest
