= Polumenta =

Polumenta is a surname. Notable people with the surname include:

- Dado Polumenta (born 1982), Montenegrin singer
- Šako Polumenta (born 1968), Montenegrin singer
