= Maya Berović =

Serbian singer (born 1987)

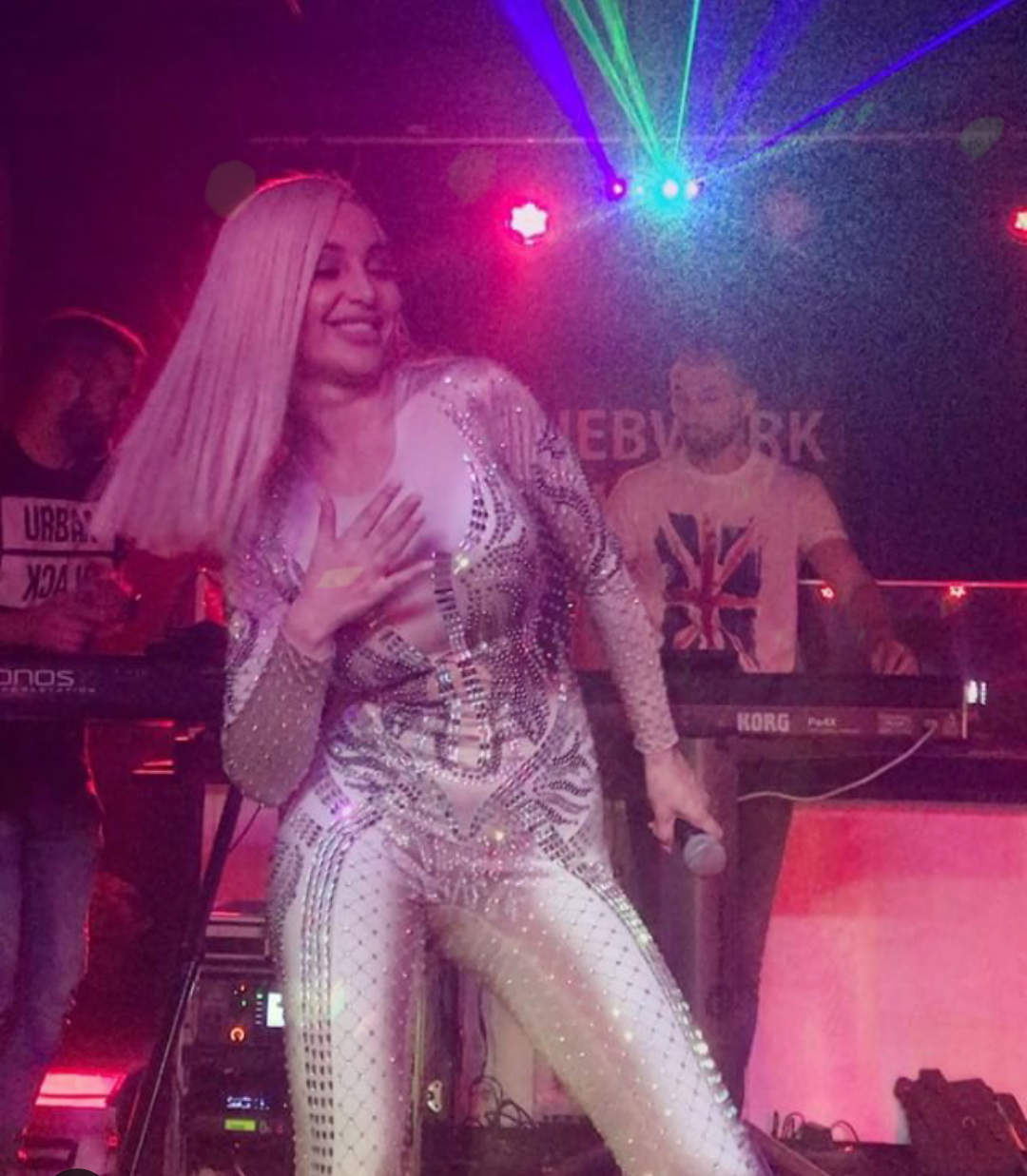
- Berović in 2017
- Born: Maja Berović; 8 July 1987 (age 39); Ilijaš, SR Bosnia and Herzegovina, SFR Yugoslavia
- Occupations: Singer; actress
- Years active: 2007–present
- Height: 1.66 m (5 ft 5 in)
- Spouse: Alen Dragosav (m. 2016)
- Children: 1
- Musical career
- Genres: Pop-folk; turbo-folk; electropop
- Instrument: Vocals
- Labels: Grand; City; BN Music; Imperia; XL Elit Invest

Maja Dragosav (born 8 July 1987), professionally known as Maya Berović, is a Serbian singer. Born in Ilijaš, she made her recording debut in 2007 with the album Život uživo. Maya saw initial success with the songs like "Džin i limunada" (2007), "Crno zlato" (2008) and "Djevojačko prezime" (2011).

Subsequently, Berović rose to substantial regional popularity by collaborating with rappers Jala Brat and Buba Corelli on her albums Viktorijina tajna (2017) and 7 (2018). Her song "Pravo vreme" is one of the most-viewed music videos by a former Yugoslav artist. In 2018, she embarked on a regional tour which kicked off with a fastest selling-concert at the Belgrade Arena. Berović has released ten studio albums.

== Early life ==
Maja Berović was born 8 July 1987 in the village of Malešići, part of the Ilijaš municipality near Sarajevo, Bosnia and Herzegovina, to Bosnian Serb parents. Her birth name was often falsely reported as "Maida" and her ethnicity has been disputed in the media. She lost her father when she was three years old. Berović lived in Malešići alongside her mother and older brother until the end of the Bosnian War in 1995, when she relocated to Bratunac where her mother was originally from. In a 2016 interview, Berović described her childhood during the Bosnian War:

"I had the bad fortune to belong to the generation that grew up during the war in Bosnia. I carry many ugly, and beautiful memories from that period of my life. The ugly memories include my family's relocation in search of a peaceful life, even though, at the time, I was not fully aware of the horrors of the situation. I spent most of my days playing, like any child."

In Bratunac, she attended school and first began practising music. From the age of 12 she used to sing in local discothèques every weekend until she turned 18. Berović grew up listening to artists such as Dragana Mirković, Lepa Brena and Ceca and lists them as her musical influences.

== Career ==
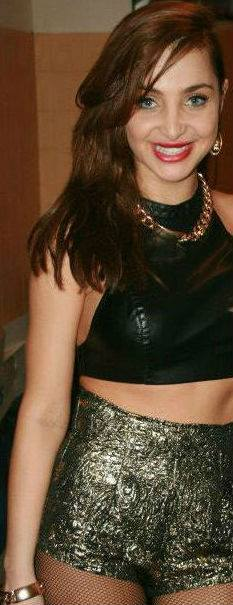
Maya Berović in 2011

Berović began performing professionally during her early teenage years. In August 2007, her debut album, Život uživo (Life: Live), was released through Grand Production. The album, which was written by Marina Tucaković and produced by Aleksandar Milić Mili, spawned the popular song Džin i limunada (Gin And Lemonade). Život uživo was followed by Crno zlato (Black Gold), released in December 2008 under IN Music. Subsequently, in February 2011, Berović released her third self-titled album through BN Music. It produced Djevojačko prezime (Maiden Surname), which Berović describes as her signature hit. The song also won the award for the 'Hit of the Year' in Sarajevo

In October 2012, Maya released Djevojka sa juga (Girl From The South) under the Belgrade-based label City Records. The following April, she also had her first performance in Belgrade. In April 2014, Berović participated in the Pink Music Festival with a club-oriented song, called Alkohol (Alcohol), produced by Damir Handanović. The song was later featured in the 2022 Netflix movie The Swimmers. Subsequently, after its release, Alkohol was included to her fifth album, Opasne vode (Dangerous Waters), released on 27 October 2014. In addition to an updated and slightly different sound, the new record was also accompanied by a new image. According to Berović, the album marked an important milestone of her gaining popularity in Serbia. Both Djevojka sa juga and Opasne vode were sold in 50,000 copies each. In March 2016, Berović released her commercially successful single Pauza (Pause) singing in Ekavian dialect instead of Ijekavian, which is dominantly spoken in Bosnia. The transition saw criticism from the audience, which perceived that Maya was trying to appeal more to Serbian market. In her own defense, Berović stated that the choice had been made due to the fact that the song was written by Serbian songwriters. However, she continued singing in Ekavian even when working with Bosnian songwriters.

On her 29th birthday, Berović released the single To me radi (It Turns Me On) featuring Bosnian rappers and producers Jala Brat and Buba Corelli. Its music video amassed over 70 million views. She continued working with the duo on her commercially acclaimed album Viktorijina tajna (Victoria's Secret), which was released on 2 July 2017 through City Records. It was sold in 50,000 copies. As of December 2022, all nine music videos from the album have collectively accumulated over 340 million views on YouTube. To promote it, Berović embarked on a regional tour, which additionally included dates in the United States. In 2017, Maya was the most streamed artist in Serbia and the fourth most-streamed artist in Croatia. The following July, she released her subsequent seventh studio album through her independent label XL Elit. It included nine tracks, again written and produced by Jala Brat and Buba Corelli, which have collectively, as of December 2022, amassed over 350 million views and over 18 million streams on Spotify. The album featured a duet with Buba Corelli, titled Pravo vreme (The Right Time), which alone has collected over 130 million views and is recognized as one of the most viewed music videos by an Ex-Yu artist. In November 2018, as a part of her regional tour, also called Pravo Vreme, Berović held a concert in the Belgrade Arena to 18,000 people. According to the media reports, the concert was also one of the fastest-selling events in the venue's history.

In July 2020, Berović held an online concert via Serbian streaming service YouBox, which was viewed by 260,000 people. On 6 August, Maya released her eight studio album, titled Intime (Intimate). The album charted in Austria and Switzerland. Ten tracks from Intime collectively accumulated over one hundred million views by the end of the year. In October, Berović released a makeup collection, called Maya Beauty Line. Her ninth album, Milion (Million), was released in July 2023. Two years later she released her tenth album X also through her independent label XL Elit. The album was released in two parts.

== Personal life ==
On 31 July 2016, Berović married Alen Dragosav. On 21 February 2022, Berović welcomed her first son, named Lav. She currently reside between Graz, Austria and Belgrade, Serbia. Berović is an Eastern Orthodox Christian.

Maya reached the milestone of one million followers on Instagram in October 2020.

=== Philanthropy ===
In July 2019, Berović showed her support for the LGBTQ+ community in Bosnia and Herzegovina by inviting people to the first ever Sarajevo Pride, held on 8 September 2019.

== Discography ==
Maya Berović discography
- Studio albums: 10
- EPs: 2
- Live albums: 2
- Compilation albums: 2
- Singles: 26

=== Albums ===
==== Studio albums ====
Title	Details	Peak chart positions	
Title	Details	AUT	SUI
Život uživo	Released: August 2007; Label: Grand Production; Format: CD, digital download, streaming	—	—
Crno zlato	Released: December 2008; Label: IN Music s.r.o.; Format: CD, digital download, streaming	—	—
Maya	Released: 17 February 2011; Label: BN Music; Format: CD, digital download, streaming	—	—
Djevojka sa juga	Released: 17 October 2012; Label: City Records; Format: CD, digital download, streaming	—	—
Opasne vode	Released: 27 October 2014; Label: City Records, DH Music; Format: CD, digital download, streaming	—	—
Viktorijina tajna	Released: 2 July 2017; Label: City Records, Imperia; Format: CD, digital download, streaming	—	—
7	Released: 8 July 2018; Label: Spinnup, Imperia; Format: CD, digital download, streaming	—	—
Intime	Released: 6 August 2020; Label: XL Elit, Leona; Format: CD, memory stick, digital download, streaming	12	30
Milion	Released: 14 July 2023; Label: XL Elit; Format: Digital download, streaming	—	—
X	Released: 10 July 2025; Label: Tiger Global Group; Format: Digital download, streaming	—	—

==== Compilation albums ====
Title	Details
The Best of Collection (17 vanvremenskih hitova)	Released: December 2017; Label: City Records; Format: CD, digital download, streaming
Zlatna kolekcija	Released: 2 July 2025; Label: City Records; Format: Digital download, streaming

==== Live albums ====
Title	Details
Koncert (Live at Štark Arena 2018)	Released: 2 December 2021; Label: XL Elit; Format: Digital download, streaming
New Year Show (Live)	Released: 1 February 2025; Label: XL Elit, Toxic Entertainment; Format: Digital download, streaming

=== Extended plays ===
Title	Details
X	Released: 16 November 2024; Label: XL Elit; Format: Digital download, streaming
X (II)	Released: 5 July 2025; Label: Tiger Global Group; Format: Digital download, streaming

=== Singles ===
Title	Year	Peak chart positions	Album
Title	Year	CRO Billb.	Album
"Džin i limunada"	2007	*	Život uživo
"Kriva rijeka"	2007	*	Život uživo
"100 dinara"	2007	*	Život uživo
"Sedativ"	2008	*	Crno zlato
"Crno zlato"	2008	*	Crno zlato
"Uspomene"	2008	*	Crno zlato
"Koliko te ludo volim ja"	2009	*	Non-album single
"Djevojačko prezime"	2011	*	Maya
"Voljela sam s tobom sve"	2011	*	Maya
"Kaldrma"	2011	*	Maya
"Amajlija"	2011	*	Maya
"Leti ptico slobodno"	2012	*	Djevojka sa juga
"Alkohol"	2014	*	Opasne vode
"Čime me drogiraš"	2014	*	Opasne vode
"Pauza"	2016	*	Zlatna kolekcija
"To me radi" (featuring Jala Brat and Buba Corelli)	2016	*	Viktorijina tajna
"Izvini tata"	2016	*	Non-album singles
"Legalna" (with Leon)	2017	*	Non-album singles
"Problem" (with Aca Lukas)	2019	*	Uspavanka za ozbiljne bebe
"Zmaj" / "Uloga" (Note: "Uloga" and "Zmaj" are included in the physical editions of Intime only.)	2019	*	Intime
"Rampampam" (with Caneras)	2021	*	Non-album singles
"Ale ale"	2022	—	Non-album singles
"Do kostiju"	2023	—	Non-album singles
"Ne računaj na mene" (with Ceca)	2024	6	Non-album singles
"Lagao je grade"	2025	—	Damir Handanović – Novi zvuk
"Habibi" (with Relja)	2025	—	Non-album single
"—" denotes a recording that did not chart. "*" denotes a recording released before the chart's launch.

== Tours ==
=== Headlining ===
- Viktorijina tajna Tour (2018)
- Pravo Vreme Tour (2018–2019)

=== Co - headlining ===
- USA Tour (2017)
