= Viktorijina tajna =

Studio album by Maya Berović
- Released: 2 July 2017
- Recorded: 2016–17
- Genre: Pop-folk
- Language: Serbian
- Labels: City Records; Imperia
- Producers: Jala Brat; Buba Corelli

Maya Berović chronology
Opasne vode (2014)	Viktorijina tajna (2017)	7 (2018)

Singles from Viktorijina tajna
- 1. "To me radi" Released: 8 July 2016

Viktorijina tajna (transl. Victoria's Secret) is the sixth studio album by Bosnian recording artist Maya Berović released on July 2, 2017 through City Records. The album is recognised as a significant departure from Maya's previous work. It contains nine pop-folk songs with strong hip-hop and pop influence. The record was written and produced by Bosnian musicians Jala Brat and Buba Corelli, whose vocals are also featured in three songs.

Following the release of the lead single, "To me radi", in July 2016, Berović announced her sixth album via her social media accounts on 27 June 2017.

== Track listing ==
Viktorijina tajna
No.	Title	Length
1.	"Balmain" (Balmain) (featuring Jala Brat and Buba Corelli)	3:01
2.	"Ledena kraljica" (Ice Queen)	3:15
3.	"Ruski rulet" (Russian Roulette)	2:56
4.	"Proleće" (Spring)	3:30
5.	"Broj" (Number)	3:00
6.	"Nisam normalna" (I'm Not Normal)	3:14
7.	"Harem" (Harem)	3:23
8.	"Mala lomi" (The Girl Is Slaying) (featuring Jala Brat and Buba Corelli)	3:08
9.	"To me radi" (That Makes Me) (featuring Jala Brat and Buba Corelli)	3:13

== Release history ==
Country	Date	Format	Label
Serbia	July 2, 2017	CD; digital download; streaming	City Records
