= Djevojka sa juga =

Studio album by Maya Berović
- Released: 17 October 2012
- Recorded: 2012
- Genre: Pop-folk
- Label: City Records
- Producer: Dragan Kovačević; Damir Handanović; Marko Peruničić; Nebojša Arežina; Dejan Abadić

Maya Berović chronology
Maya (2011)	Djevojka sa juga (2012)	Opasne vode (2014)

Singles from Djevojka sa juga
- 1. "Leti ptico slobodno" Released: 25 June 2012

Djevojka sa juga (English: Girl from the South) is the fourth studio album by Bosnian-Serbian recording artist Maya Berovic, released on 17 October 2012. It is her first release with City Records after she had left BN Music. The record was written and produced by several artists, most notably Damir Handanović.

The lead single, "Leti ptico slobodno", was released with a music video on 25 June 2012. A music video for "Mama mama" was uploaded on 10 October 2012.

== Track listing ==
- Credits adapted from Discogs.

No.	Title	Writer(s)	Producer(s)	Length
1.	"Mama mama" (Mom Mom)	Saša Lazić; Damir Handanović	Dragan Kovačević	3:05
2.	"Djevojka sa juga" (Girl from the South)	Pera Stokanović; Marko Peruničić; Nebojša Arežina	Atelje Trag	3:47
3.	"Vjeruj ženi koja pije" (Trust a Woman Who Drinks)	Dragan Brajović; Handanović	Kovačević	3:11
4.	"Jedan pravi" (The Right One)	Lazić; Handanović	Kovačević	3:02
5.	"Ko sam ja" (Who Am I)	Jelena Trifunović; Bojan Vasić	Kovačević	3:37
6.	"Pilule" (Pills)	Trifunović; Vasić	Kovačević	3:32
7.	"Ne cvjetaju mi jorgovani" (Lilacs Do Not Bloom for Me)	Brajović	Kovačević	4:08
8.	"Kopriva" (Stinging Nettle)	Brajović	Kovačević	3:32
9.	"Zulum" (Oppression)	Darko Popović; Handanović	Handanović	2:45
10.	"Leti ptico slobodno" (Fly Bird, Freely)	Dragiša Baša	Dejan Abadić	3:44

== Personnel ==
=== Instruments ===
- Dejan Kostić – backing vocals (1, 3, 4, 5, 6, 7, 8)
- Ivana Selakov – backing vocals (1, 3, 4, 5, 6, 7, 8)
- Ksenija Milošević – backing vocals (9)
- Suzana Dinić – backing vocals (9, 10)
- Dragan Kovačević Struja – accordion (1, 3, 4, 5, 6, 7, 8)
- Aca Krsmanović – accordion (9)
- Bane Vasić – accordion (10)
- Damir Handanović – drum programming, keyboards (9)
- Paja Vučković – guitar (1, 3, 4, 5, 6, 7, 8)
- Ivan Bamby Mirković – guitar, bass guitar (9)
- Petar Trumbetaš – guitar, bouzouki (10)

=== Production and recording ===
- Oliver Jovanović – mastering
- Lazar Milić – mixing (9)
- Dragan Kovačević Struja – production, mixing, programming (1, 3, 4, 5, 6, 7, 8)
- Dušan Glišić – programming (1, 3, 4, 5, 6, 7, 8)
- Đorđe Janković – programming (1, 3, 4, 5, 6, 7, 8)
- Đorđe Petrović – programming (10)
- Vuk Zirojević – sound designing, mixing (10)

=== Crew ===
- Andreja Damnjanović – photography
- Dejan Milićević - photography, videography

== Release history ==
Region	Date	Label
Serbia	17 October 2012	City Records
Bosnia and Herzegovina	17 October 2012	City Records
Croatia	20 October 2012	City Records
