= Elena Kitić =

Serbian singer (born 1997)

Elena Елена
- Born: Elena Kitić; 11 August 1997 (age 29); Hanover, Germany
- Genres: Pop; hip hop; R&B
- Occupations: Singer; songwriter
- Instrument: Voice
- Years active: 2014–present
- Labels: Toxic Entertainment; IDJTunes; Imperia; Balkaton

Elena Kitić (Serbian Cyrillic: Елена Китић; born 11 August 1997), known mononymously as Elena, is a Serbian singer.

== Life and career ==
Elena Kitić was born 11 August 1997 in Hanover, Germany to Bosnian Serb singers Mile Kitić and Marta Savić. She made her recording debut with the English-language single "Better Days", released in October 2014.

In July 2016, Kitić gained popularity with the release of "Folira" featuring Bosnian rapper Jala Brat, who would become her frequent collaborator. She also worked with Serbian rapper Rasta on the single "Geto princeza" (2018). Her first live performance was at Jala Brat and Buba Corelli's show at Tašmajdan Center in Belgrade, June 2018. Elena received the Best Music Video Styling award at the Belgrade streetwear festival, Sneakerville, in December 2020.

Her 2022 single with Serbian artist Voyage, entitled "London", topped the Billboard Croatia Songs Chart.

On 7 March 2025, Kitić independently released her debut studio album Déjà vu. To promote the album, she performed at the Belgrade's Music Week Festival in June.

== Discography ==
Elena discography
- Studio albums: 1
- Singles: 24
- Music videos: 29

=== Studio albums ===
List of studio albums, showing release date, label and chart positions
Title
Déjà vu
Details
- Released: 7 March 2025
- Label: Self-released
- Format: Digital download, streaming
Notes
Track listing
- No.	Title	Length
  1.	"Elena"
  2.	"Kiša kada padne"
  3.	"Jala Brat Interlude" (featuring Jala Brat)
  4.	"Bang Bang"
  5.	"Puma"
  6.	"Zatvaranje" (featuring Buba Corelli)
  7.	"Tralala"
  8.	"Ton po ton" (featuring Anastasija)
  9.	"Ele Ele"
  10.	"Motiv"

=== Singles ===
==== As lead artist ====
Title	Year	Peak chart positions			Album
Title	Year	AUT	AUT Billb.	CRO Billb.	Album
"Better Days"	2014	—	—	—	Non-album singles
"Folira" (featuring Jala Brat)	2016	—	—	—	Non-album singles
"Zlato"	2017	—	—	—	Non-album singles
"Geto princeza"	2018	—	—	—	Non-album singles
"Colombiana" (featuring 2Bona)	2019	—	—	—	Non-album singles
"Zabranjujem"	2019	—	—	—	Non-album singles
"2000's"	2019	—	—	—	Non-album singles
"Harakiri"	2020	—	—	—	Non-album singles
"Psh Psh"	2020	—	—	—	Non-album singles
"Fobije"	2021	—	—	—	Non-album singles
"Laži"	2021	—	—	—	Non-album singles
"Svemir"	2021	—	—	—	Non-album singles
"London" (with Voyage)	2022	29	22	1	Europol
"Pare" (with Mile Kitić)	2023	—	—	—	Non-album singles
"Scene" (with Mixa)	2023	—	—	—	Non-album singles
"Extra fancy"	2023	—	—	—	Non-album singles
"Elena"	2024	—	—	—	Déjà vu
"Puklo nebo" (with Jala Brat and Medi)	2024	—	—	5	Goat Season (Part One)
"Paranoie" (with Inas)	2026	—	—	—	Babayaga
"Shalala" (with Jala Brat and Buba Corelli)	2026	—	—	1	Non-album single

==== As featured artist ====
Title	Year	Peak chart positions		Album
Title	Year	AUT	CRO Billb.	Album
"Ne volim" (Jala Brat and Buba Corelli featuring Elena)	2017	—	—	Kruna
"Bijele flaše" (Jala Brat featuring Elena)	2021	—	—	Futura
"Blaka, blaka" (Jala Brat and Buba Corelli featuring Elena)	2024	67	1	Goat Season: Final Chapter
"Penthouse" (Amna featuring Elena)	2025	—	—	Takva sam

=== Other charted songs ===
List of other charted songs, with selected chart positions, showing year released and album name
Title	Year	Peak chart positions	Album
Title	Year	CRO Billb.	Album
"Zatvaranje" (featuring Buba Corelli)	2025	7	Déjà vu
"Ele Ele"	2025	5	Déjà vu
"Puma"	2025	18	Déjà vu

=== Music videos ===
List of music videos, showing year released and director(s)
Title	Year	Director
"Better Days"	2014	Hadži-Aleksandar Đurović
"Folira" (featuring Jala Brat)	2016	Toxic Entertainment
"Zlato"	2017	Vedad Jašarević
"Geto princeza"	2018	Stefan Đurić Rasta
"Colombiana" (featuring 2Bona)	2019	Ljubba
"Zabranjujem"	2019	Ljubba; Igor Lazić
"2000's"	2019	Ljubba
"Psh Psh"	2020	Nemanja Novaković
"Fobije"	2021	unknown
"Bijele flaše" (Jala Brat featuring Elena)	2021	Arnej Misirlić
"Laži"	2021	Nemanja Novaković
"London" (with Voyage)	2022	Nemanja Novaković
"Pare" (with Mile Kitić)	2023	Ljubba
"Scene" (with Mixa)	2023	Marija Šehanović
"Extra fancy"	2023	Marija Šehanović
"Elena"	2024	Marija Šehanović
"Puklo nebo" (with Jala Brat and Medi)	2024	Dino Šehić
"Blaka, blaka" (Jala Brat and Buba Corelli featuring Elena)	2024	Dino Šehić
"Kiša kada padne"	2025	Marija Šehanović
"Jala Brat Interlude"	2025	Marija Šehanović
"Bang Bang"	2025	Marija Šehanović
"Puma"	2025	Marija Šehanović
"Zatvaranje" (featuring Buba Corelli)	2025	Marija Šehanović
"Tralala"	2025	Marija Šehanović
"Ton po ton" (featuring Anastasija)	2025	Marija Šehanović
"Ele Ele"	2025	Marija Šehanović
"Motiv"	2025	Marija Šehanović
"Penthouse" (Amna featuring Elena)	2025	Marija Šehanović
"Paranoie" (with Inas)	2026	Marko Mravik; Marija Šehanović
"Shalala" (with Jala Brat and Buba Corelli)	2026	Luka Matković; Ana Cindrić
