= Milan Stanković =

Serbian singer-songwriter (born 1987)

Milan Stanković Милан Станковић
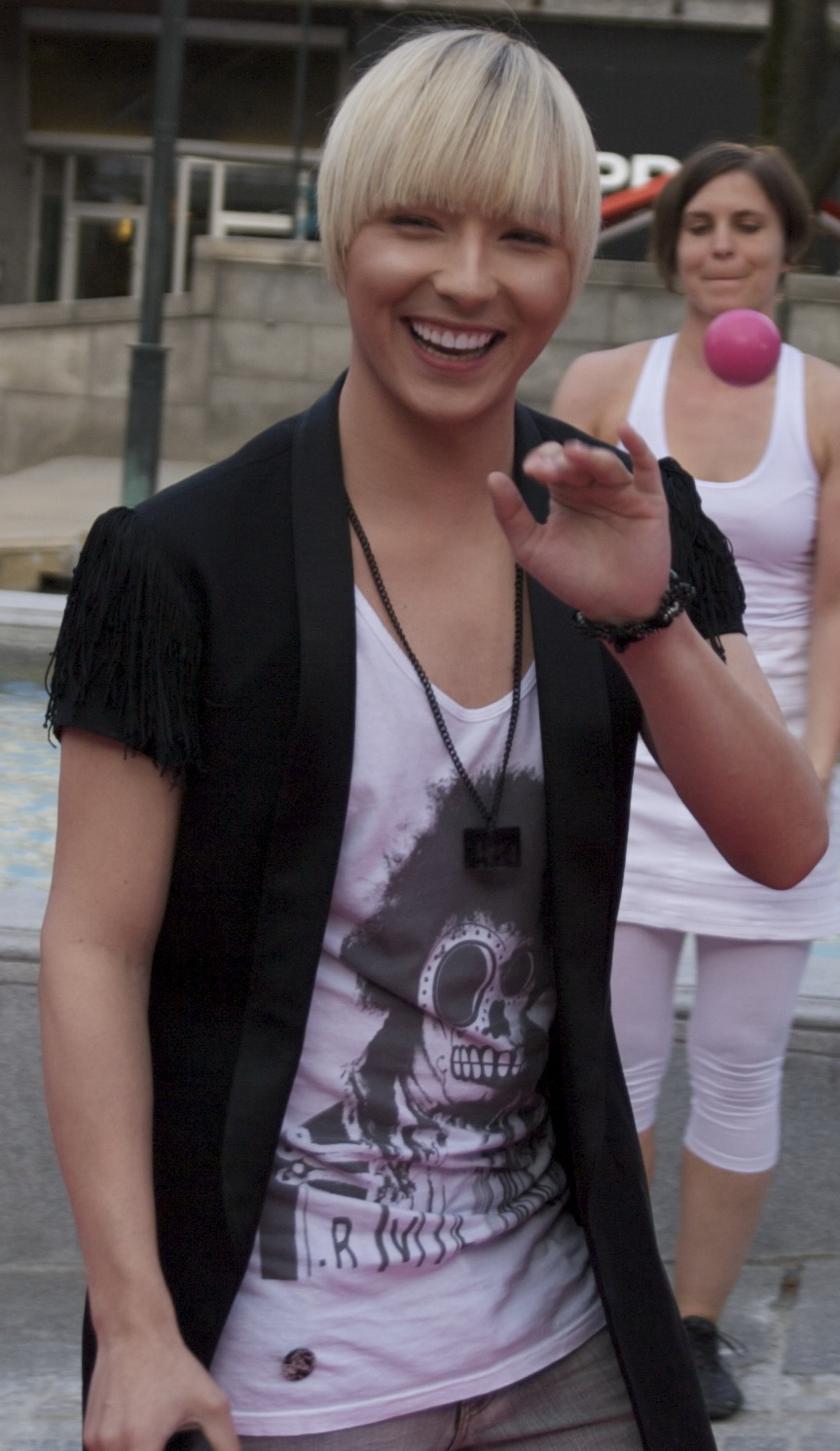
- Stanković in Oslo, 2010

Background information
- Born: Milan Stanković; 9 September 1987 (age 39); Obrenovac, SR Serbia, SFR Yugoslavia
- Genres: Pop; electropop; pop-folk
- Occupations: Singer; songwriter
- Instruments: Vocals; piano
- Years active: 2007–present
- Labels: Grand Production; City Records; IDJTunes

Milan Stanković (Serbian Cyrillic: Милан Станковић; born 9 September 1987) is a Serbian singer and songwriter. He rose to prominence as a finalist on Zvezde Granda in 2007. Stanković acquired wider fame by representing Serbia in the Eurovision Song Contest 2010 in Oslo, Norway with "Ovo je Balkan", finishing in 13th place.

Additionally to his recording career, he served as a judge on the children's singing competition Pinkove Zvezdice (2014–2018).

== Early life ==
Stanković was born on 9 September 1987 in Obrenovac, SFR Yugoslavia, and was raised by a single mother. According to Stanković, his father, who was arrested for homicide when Milan was five months old, died after five years in prison under unexplained circumstances. He has a half sister from his mother's second marriage. Stanković graduated from a secondary medical school.

== Career ==
=== 2007–2010: Career beginnings and Eurovision ===
Stanković gained initial fame as a contestant on the third season of the singing competition Zvezde Granda in 2007, where he placed 4th. Recognized for performing mostly songs by Zdravko Čolić, he received widespread public attention due to his k-pop influenced appearance and relationship with fellow-contestant Rada Manojlović. Two years following the competition, Stanković released his debut album Solo under Grand Production, which sold 50,000 copies.

On 13 March 2010, Stanković competed against singers Emina Jahović and Olivera Katić in the national selection competition organized by Radio Television of Serbia to choose the Serbian representative for the Eurovision Song Contest 2010 in Oslo, Norway. By receiving 45% of the public votes, he ended up winning the festival with his entry, titled "Ovo je Balkan", written by Goran Bregović, Marina Tucaković and Ljiljana Jorgovanović. During the first semi-final of the Eurovision, held on 25 May, Stanković performed seventh, placing fifth and thus qualifying for the final. On 27 May he performed eighth, and finished in 13th place with 72 points.

=== 2011–2020: Milan and collaboration with Jala & Buba ===
After Eurovision, Stanković was dropped from Grand Production due to breech of contract, according to its then CEO and owner Saša Popović. This situation, along with his breakup with Rada Manojlović, led Milan to take a brief hiatus from public performance. In September 2013, Stanković released the single "Od mene se odvikavaj". He then participated in the Pink Music Festival 2014 with "Luda ženo", where he received three awards. In September 2014, he also became a judge on the children's singing competition Pinkove Zvezdice, on which he continued appearing for four non-consecutive seasons. On 3 March 2015, Stanković announced his sophomore album by releasing two singles – "Mašina" and "Nisi mu ti žena". In July, he collaborated with Serbian rapper Mimi Mercedez and turbo-folk singer Mile Kitić on the single "Gadure". In September, he released his eponymous EP under City Records, which featured previously released singles and three new songs.

In February 2017, Milan released the single "Ego" featuring Bosnian hip hop duo Jala Brat and Buba Corelli. As of May 2022, the music video has collected over eighty million views on YouTube, making it his most viewed song on this platform. Between 2018 and 2019, he released three more singles – "Trance", "Kripton" (2018) and "Brane mi te" (2019), as a part of his so-called "Tokyo trilogy". Stanković worked with Jala Brat and Buba Corelli once again on the single "Pablo", released in July 2020.

== Personal life ==
Stanković was in an on-again, off-again relationship with fellow-Zvezde Granda contestant Rada Manojlović between 2008 and 2012.

== Discography ==
Studio albums and EPs

- Solo (2009)
- Milan (2015)

Non-album singles

- "Ovo je Balkan" (2010)
- "Ego" (2017), feat. Jala Brat & Buba Corelli
- "Sve što ne smemo" (2017), feat. Ina Gardijan
- "Trance" (2018)
- "Kripton" (2018)
- "Brane mi te" (2019)
- "Pablo" (2020), feat. Jala Brat & Buba Corelli

== Awards and nominations ==
Award	Year	Category	Nominee/work	Result	Ref.
Barbara Dex Award	2010	Worst Dressed Act	Himself	Won	
Pink Music Festival	2014	Artists' Award	"Luda ženo"	Won	
Pink Music Festival	2014	Audience Award	"Luda ženo"	Won	
Pink Music Festival	2014	YouTube Award	"Luda ženo"	Won	
Music Awards Ceremony	2019	Collaboration of the Year	"Ego" (ft. Jala Brat & Buba Corelli)	Nominated	
Music Awards Ceremony	2020	Modern Dance Song of the Year	"Trans"	Nominated	
Music Awards Ceremony	2020	Music Video of the Year	"Trans"	Nominated	

Music festivals

- Tri pa jedan za Oslo (2010); winner
- Eurovision Song Contest 2010; 13th place
- Pink Music Festival 2014; 7th place

== See also ==
- Music of Serbia
- Zvezde Granda
- Eurovision Song Contest 2010

Awards and achievements
Preceded by Marko Kon and Milaan with Cipela	Serbia in the Eurovision Song Contest; 2010	Succeeded by Nina with Čaroban
