= Uvek kad popijem =

Single by DJ Shone featuring Dara Bubamara and MC Yankoo
- Released: 1 June 2014
- Recorded: May 2014
- Genre: Pop; Europop; Electronic
- Length: 3:32
- Label: Shone Entertainment
- Songwriter: Ivana Malešević
- Producers: Atelje Impuls; Shone Entertainment

DJ Shone singles chronology
"Probijam led" (2012)	"Uvek kad popijem" (2014)	"Muške priče" (2015)

Dara Bubamara singles chronology
"Kraj i tačka" (2014)	"Uvek kad popijem" (2014)	"Karera" (2014)

MC Yankoo singles chronology
"Sweet Ass Girls" (2014)	"Uvek kad popijem" (2014)	"Around the World" (2014)

"Uvek kad popijem" (Whenever I Drink) is a song recorded by Serbian recording artist DJ Shone featuring pop star Dara Bubamara and rapper MC Yankoo. It was released 1 June 2014 through the label Shone Entertainment. The song was written by Ivana Malešević. It was produced and recorded in Belgrade.

The music video was shot in May 2014 and premiered 2 June 2014.
