= Dara 2013 =

Studio album by Dara Bubamara
- Released: 19 April 2013
- Recorded: 2011–13: Belgrade; Novi Sad
- Genre: dance-pop; pop folk
- Label: City Records
- Producer: Damir Handanović

Dara Bubamara chronology
| Sangrija (2010) | Dara 2013 (2013) | Biografija (2017) |

Singles from Dara 2013
- 1. "Galama" Released: 26 April 2011; 2. "Delete" Released: 25 December 2012

Dara 2013 is the twelfth studio album by Serbian turbo folk singer Dara Bubamara. It was released 19 April 2013 through City Records.

== Background ==
Recording sessions for the album, which took place in Belgrade and Novi Sad, ended in early 2013.

== Release and promotion ==
The album was first released worldwide digitally 19 April 2013, available for purchase on iTunes and Amazon. It became available on CD 30 April 2013.

Bubamara performed several songs from Dara 2013 on the Ami G Show hosted by Ognjen Amidžić on 23 April 2013. Appearing alongside her for the interview was songwriter Marina Tucaković, who penned nine of the album's 15 songs.

== Singles ==
"Galama" was the album's lead single. It was released 26 April 2011. The second single was "Delete", released 25 December 2012.

== Track listing ==
All tracks are produced by Damir Handanović.

| No. | Title | Lyrics | Music | Arrangement | Length |
|---|---|---|---|---|---|
| 1. | "Pusti tu priču" | Marina Tucaković | Handanović | Handanović | 3:22 |
| 2. | "Džoni, Džoni" (featuring Big Ali) | Tucaković; Divna Milovanović | Bojan Vasić | Mr. Beat | 3:22 |
| 3. | "Volim sve što ne valja" | Tucaković | Dražen Damjanović | Vasić; Mr. Beat | 3:14 |
| 4. | "Morena, Morena" | Tucaković; Milovanović | Bojan Vasić | Mr. Beat | 3:25 |
| 5. | "Sklonite me, drugovi" | Tucaković | Handanović | Handanović; Aleksandar Krsmanović | 3:54 |
| 6. | "Vozi me, vozi" | Tucaković | Handanović | Handanović | 2:52 |
| 7. | "U glas" (featuring Mare) | Milovanović | Vasić | Mr. Beat | 3:27 |
| 8. | "Pesma za mamu" | Tucaković | Damjanović | Mr. Beat | 3:06 |
| 9. | "Neka zna" (featuring Elmnt) | Damjanović | Damjanović | Mr. Beat | 3:24 |
| 10. | "Tebi ništa nije sveto" | Damjanović | Damjanović | Vasić; Mr. Beat | 4:09 |
| 11. | "Kraljica ogledala" | Tucaković | Handanović | Handanović | 3:12 |
| 12. | "Javi se, javi" | Milovanović | Damjanović | Mr. Beat | 3:41 |
| 13. | "Balkanac" | Damjanović | Damjanović | Mr. Beat | 3:31 |

Bonus tracks
| No. | Title | Lyrics | Music | Arrangement | Length |
|---|---|---|---|---|---|
| 14. | "Delete" | Miloš Roganović | Roganović | Roganović | 2:59 |
| 15. | "Galama" | Tucaković | DJ Kim | Aleksandar Kobac | 3:31 |

Sample credits

- "Volim sve što ne valja" contains an interpolation of "Assim Você Mata o Papai" (2012), written by Nicco Andrade, as performed by Sorriso Maroto.
- "Pesma za mamu" contains an interpolation of "Amar não é Pecado" (2011), written by Fred Liel, Daniel Rodrigues Alves, Marco Aurélio Ferreira and Márcia Araújo, as performed by Luan Santana.
- "Neka zna" contains an interpolation of "Hiya Hiya" (2012), written by Sam Debbie, Nadir Khayat, Armando Pérez, Alexander Papaconstantinou and Bilal Hajji, as performed by Khaled featuring Pitbull.
- "Balkanac" contains an interpolation of "Chammak Challo" (2011), penned by Vishal Dadlani and Niranjan Iyengar and composed by Vishal–Shekhar and Aliaune Thiam, as performed by Akon and Hamsika Iyer.
- "Galama" contains an interpolation of "Ray Rayi" (2010), written by Nocif, Cheb Rayan and Yassine, as performed by Nocif featuring Cheb Rayan.

== Personnel ==
=== Instruments ===
- Ksenija Milošević – backing vocals (1, 5, 6, 11)
- Marinko Stambolija – backing vocals (3, 4, 7, 8, 9, 12, 13)
- Suzana Dinić – backing vocals (1, 3, 4, 5, 6, 7, 8, 9, 11, 12, 13)
- Aleksandar Krsmanović – accordion (1, 5, 6, 11)
- Dragan Ivanović – bass (3), guitar/bouzouki (10)
- Petar Trumbetaš – guitar/bouzouki (10), bass (1, 5, 6, 11)
- Dragan Todorović – guitar, bouzouki, bass (1, 5, 6, 11)
- Ivan Mirković – guitar, bouzouki, bass (1, 5, 6, 11)
- Kalin Georgiev – kaval (10)
- Bojan Vasić – keyboards (3, 10)
- Damir Handanović – keyboards (1, 5, 6, 11)

=== Production and recording ===
- Mr. Beat – arrangement, mixing, mastering (3, 4, 7, 8, 9, 10, 12, 13)
- Damir Handanović – programming, editing, producing (1, 5, 6, 11)
- Goran Radinović – recording, mixing (1, 5, 6, 11)
