= Opasan =

Single by Dara Bubamara

from the album Biografija
- Released: 24 January 2014
- Genre: Pop; Turbo-folk; Europop
- Length: 3:14
- Label: Self-released
- Songwriters: Slobodan Veljković; Stefan Đurić

Dara Bubamara singles chronology
"Delete" (2012)	"Opasan" (2014)	"Kraj i tačka" (2014)

"Opasan" ("Dangerous") is a song recorded by Serbian pop recording artist Dara Bubamara. It was self-released 24 January 2014. The song was written by Slobodan Veljković and Stefan Đurić. It was produced and recorded in Belgrade.

The music video for "Opasan" was shot in early January 2014 and premiered 25 January.
