= Rada Manojlović =

Serbian singer

Rada Manojlović Рада Манојловић
- Born: Radmila Manojlović; 25 August 1985 (age 40); Požarevac, SR Serbia, SFR Yugoslavia
- Origin: Četereže, Serbia
- Genres: Pop-folk
- Occupation: Singer
- Instrument: Vocals
- Years active: 2007–present
- Labels: Grand Production; IDJTunes

Radmila Manojlović (Serbian Cyrillic: Радмила Манојловић, pronounced [ˌrǎdmila maˈnǒːjloʋit͜ɕ]; born 25 August 1985), better known as Rada Manojlović, is a Serbian singer. She rose to prominence as a contestant on the singing competition show Zvezde Granda in 2007.

== Life and career ==
Manojlović was born on 25 August 1985 in Požarevac, SFR Yugoslavia and grew up in the nearby village of Četereže.

In 2003, Manojlović released her first album, Ćao bezobrazni, which failed to find commercial success. In 2007, Manojlović rose to public attention as a contestant on the third season of the singing competition Zvezde Granda, where she finished in second place to Dušan Svilar. Subsequently, she released Deset ispod nule under Grand Production in 2009, which circulated in 180,000 copies.

In February 2011, Manojlović was awarded the Female Folk Singer of the Year at the Oskar Popularnosti award ceremony. Also that year, she released the album Marakana, which yielded several hit songs, including the title track, "Nije meni", "S mora na planine" and "Mešaj mala" featuring Saša Matić. It was sold in 120,000 copies. In the following years, she released numerous standalone singles, including "Alkotest", "Biseri i svila" (2016) with Haris Berković, and "Svadba" (2019) with Emil Đulović. At the beginning of 2016, Manojlović was announced as a judge on the second season of the children's version of Zvezde Granda, called Neki novi klinci.

== Personal life ==
Between 2008 and 2012, Manojlović was in a relationship with fellow Zvezde Granda contestant Milan Stanković.

== Discography ==
Studio albums

- Deset ispod nule (2009)
- Marakana (2011)
- Prva dama (2024)

== Filmography ==
Filmography of Rada Manojlović
Year	Title	Genre	Role	Notes
2007	Zvezde Granda	Television	Herself	Season 3, Runner-up
2016	Neki novi klinci	Television	Herself	Season 2, Judge
