= Život uživo =

Studio album by Maya Berović
- Released: August 2007
- Recorded: 2006–07
- Genre: Turbo-folk
- Label: Grand Production
- Producer: Aleksandar Milić

Maya Berović chronology
Život uživo (2007)	Crno zlato (2008)

Singles from Život uživo
- 1. "Džin i limunada" Released: August 2007; 2. "Kriva rijeka" Released: 2007; 3. "100 dinara" Released: 2007

Život uživo (English: Life: Live) is the debut studio album by Bosnian-Serbian pop star Maya Berović. It was released August 2007 through the record label Grand Production in Bosnia and Herzegovina and Serbia.

== Background ==
Aged 19 in 2006, Maya signed with the Belgrade-based record label Grand Production, co-owned by Lepa Brena and Saša Popović, and teamed up with Grand's main songwriter Marina Tucaković and composer and musician Aleksandar Milić as the producer.

Not long after the album's release, Berović parted ways with Grand Production. In 2015 she explained that she and Grand director Saša Popović had differing ideas and that she is happy with her current label City Records.

== Singles ==
"Džin i limunada" (English: Gin and Lemonade) was the album's only single and served as Maya's debut single. It was premiered shortly before the official release of Life in person in August 2007.

== Track listing ==
No.	Title	Writer(s)	Producer(s)	Length
1.	"Džin i limunada" (Gin and Lemonade)	Marina Tucaković	Aleksandar Milić	3:44
2.	"Poljubi je za mene" (Kiss Her for Me)	Tucaković	Milić	3:18
3.	"Život uživo" (Life: Live)	Tucaković	Milić	4:04
4.	"Kriva rijeka" (Curving River)	Tucaković	Milić	3:13
5.	"100 dinara" (100 dinars)	Tucaković	Milić	4:00
6.	"Šta ja imam što te imam" (What Do I Have Because I Have You)	Tucaković	Milić	4:02
7.	"Nije moja soba bez kreveta" (It's Not My Room Without A Bed)	Tucaković	Milić	2:59
8.	"Zanosi, zanosi" (Fascinate, Fascinate)	Tucaković	Milić	3:31

== Personnel ==
=== Instruments ===
- Igor Malešević – drum programming
- Petar Trumbetaš – guitar, bouzouki
- Goran Radinović – keyboards
- Zoran Kiki Caušević – percussion

=== Production and recording ===
- Dejan Vučković – mixing
- Aleksandar Milić – arrangement
- Goran Radinović – programming
