= Karera (disambiguation) =

Karera is a municipality in India.

Karera may also refer to:

- Karera (Dara Bubamara song), a 2014 song by Dara Bubamara
- Karera (Bini song), a 2023 song by Bini
