= Delete (Dara Bubamara song) =

Single by Dara Bubamara

from the album Dara 2013
- Released: 25 December 2012
- Genre: Pop; Europop
- Length: 2:59
- Label: Self-release; City Records
- Songwriter: Miloš Roganović

Dara Bubamara singles chronology
"Pogledom te skidam" (2012)	"Delete" (2012)	"Opasan" (2014)

"Delete" is a song recorded by Serbian pop recording artist Dara Bubamara. It was self-released 25 December 2012 and was featured as a bonus track on her twelfth studio album Dara 2013, released by City Records. The song was written by Miloš Roganović. It was produced and recorded in Belgrade.

Bubamara premiered the song on the Ami G Show, hosted by Ognjen Amidžić, as a New Year's gift to her fans. The song's title is in the English language and is the only English word used in the song.
