= DeVito =

DeVito, De Vito, or de Vito is an Italian surname which may refer to:

- Cosima De Vito (born 1976), Australian singer
- Danny DeVito (born 1944), American actor
- Gaetano de Vito (1884–1964), Italian painter
- Gioconda de Vito (1907–1994), Italian-British musician
- Joe DeVito (born 1968), American comedian
- Karla DeVito (born 1953), American singer
- Lucy DeVito (born 1983), American actress
- Louie DeVito, American disc jockey
- Marco De Vito (born 1991), Italian footballer
- Mathias J. DeVito (1930–2019), American businessperson and lawyer
- Roberto De Vito (1867–1959), Italian politician
- Sayra DeVito, American politician
- Tommy DeVito (American football) (born 1998), American football player
- Tommy DeVito (musician) (1928–2020), American musician
- Tony DeVito (born 1972), American professional wrestler

== See also ==
- Devito (rapper), Serbian rapper
