= Mafia (Jala Brat and Buba Corelli song) =

Single by Jala Brat and Buba Corelli

from the album Alfa & Omega
- Released: 15 April 2018
- Studio: Imperia Studio, Sarajevo, Bosnia and Herzegovina
- Genre: hip hop
- Length: 2:36
- Label: Imperia
- Songwriters: Amar Hodžić; Jasmin Fazlić
- Producers: RimDa, KC Blaze

Jala Brat singles chronology
"Nema bolje" (2017)	"Mafia" (2018)	"Ona'e" (2018)

Buba Corelli singles chronology
"Nema bolje" (2017)	"Mafia" (2018)	"Balenciaga" (2018)

"Mafia" is a song by Bosnian rappers Jala Brat and Buba Corelli. It was released on 15 April 2018 as a single from their third studio album Alfa & Omega produced by their record label Imperia. The song was written by Jala Brat and Buba Corelli. It was produced and recorded at Imperia Studios in Sarajevo, Bosnia and Herzegovina.

== Music video ==
The music video was directed and produced by Dino Šehić and Esmir Šabić and premiered 15 April 2018. Within the first 24 hours the video was viewed more than a million times on YouTube.
