= Crno zlato =

Crno zlato Black Gold

Studio album by Maya Berović
- Released: December 2008
- Recorded: 2008: Zemun
- Genre: dance-pop; pop folk
- Label: IN Music s.r.o.
- Producer: D.K. Struja; Alen Dragosav (executive producer)

Maya Berović chronology
Život uživo (2007)	Crno zlato Black Gold (2008)	Maya (2011)

Singles from Crno zlato
- 1. "Sedativ" Released: 5 May 2008; 2. "Crno zlato" Released: 15 October 2008; 3. "Uspomene" Released: 21 January 2009

Crno zlato (English: Black Gold) is the second studio album by Bosnian-Serbian pop star Maya Berović. It was released December 2008 through the short-lived IN Music s.r.o. in Bosnia and Herzegovina and Serbia.

== Background ==
Aged 19 in 2006, Maya signed with the Belgrade-based record label Grand Production, co-owned by Lepa Brena and Saša Popović, and released her first studio album Život uživo (2007). Berović signed with IN Music s.r.o. in 2008 after parting ways with Grand Production. In 2015 she explained that she and Grand director Saša Popović had differing ideas and that she is happy with her current label City Records.

In 2008 she teamed up with songwriter Branislav Samardžić and composer Dragan Kovačević D.K. Struja. The result was her second studio album Crno zlato.

== Singles ==
"Sedativ" (English: Sedative) was released as the album's lead single on 5 May 2008. The title song was released as the second official single in October 2008, followed by "Uspomene" (English: Memories) in January 2009. All three singles had music videos.

== Track listing ==
No.	Title	Writer(s)	Producer(s)	Length
1.	"Uspomene" (Memories)	Branislav Samardžić	D.K. Struja	3:45
2.	"Crno zlato" (Black Gold)	Samardžić	D.K. Struja	3:12
3.	"Djevojački san" (Girlhood Dream)	Samardžić	D.K. Struja	3:02
4.	"Ni za godina sto" (Not For a Hundred Years)	Samardžić	D.K. Struja	3:32
5.	"Miris prevare" (The Smell of Deception)	Samardžić	D.K. Struja	3:38
6.	"Ja volim za oboje" (I Love for the Both of Us)	Samardžić	D.K. Struja	3:12
7.	"Ne vjerujem tvojim usnama" (I Do Not Believe Your Lips)	Samardžić	D.K. Struja	3:11
8.	"Upoznaj me s' njom" (Introduce Me to Her)	Samardžić	D.K. Struja	3:58
9.	"Loše vrijeme" (Bad Time)	Samardžić	D.K. Struja	3:24
10.	"Sedativ" (Sedative)	Samardžić	D.K. Struja	3:51

== Personnel ==
=== Instruments ===
- Ivana Selakov – back vocals
- D.K. Struja – keyboards
- Petar Trumbetaš – bouzouki, acoustic guitar, electric guitar
- Braca Kolarević – saxophone, trumpet

=== Production and recording ===
- D.K. Struja – arrangement, mixing, mastering, producing, programming
- Alen Dragosav – executive producer
- Đorđe Janković – mixing, mastering
- Dušan Glišić – programming

=== Crew ===
- Iva Rakić – design
- Rade Davidov – makeup, hair
- Nenad Todorović – styling
- Edvard Nalbantjan – photography
