= Milena Ćeranić =

Serbian singer (born 1986)

Milena Ćeranić Милена Ћеранић
- Born: 3 April 1986 (age 40); Kragujevac, SR Serbia, SFR Yugoslavia
- Genres: Pop-folk
- Occupation: Singer
- Instrument: Voice
- Years active: 2009–present
- Labels: Grand Production; City Records; IDJTunes

Milena Ćeranić (Serbian Cyrillic: Милена Ћеранић; born 3 April 1986) is a Serbian singer from Kragujevac. She rose to prominence a contestant on Zvezde Granda (2008-2009) and Farma (2010). Her best-known songs include "Dvadesete gazim" (2010) and "Krivog bih te branila" (2025).

== Discography ==
Studio albums

- Moj prvi (2025)

== Filmography ==
- Zvezde Granda (2008-09); Top-12
- Farma (2010); 10th place

== Music festivals ==
- Pink Music Festival (2014) - "Luda balkanska"; failed to qualify
- Pink Music Festival (2015) - "Sve pred sobom gazim"; 10th place
