= Buntovnik =

Buntovnik Rebel

Studio album by Dado Polumenta
- Released: 18 November 2010
- Recorded: 2009–10: Belgrade, Serbia
- Genre: dance-pop; pop folk
- Label: Grand Production
- Producer: Goran Radinović; Marko Peruničić; Nebojša Arežina; Rade Kovačević; Saša Kovačević; Zlaja Timotić

Dado Polumenta chronology
Zauvijek tvoj (2008)	Buntovnik; Rebel (2010)	Virus (2011)

Singles from Buntovnik
- 1. "Od vina si me opila" Released: 14 October 2010; 2. "Nije od karmina" Released: 15 October 2010

Buntovnik (English: Rebel) is the fifth studio album by Montenegrin dance-pop recording artist Dado Polumenta. It was released on 18 November 2010 through the record label Grand Production.

== Background ==
Buntovnik was announced on 28 September 2010, two months prior to its release. The album was released by the record company Grand Production, Polumenta's first album under the label since 100 stepeni (2005).

"Sedam Subota" is a duet with Serbian singer Aca Lukas.

== Singles ==
The album's second single "Nije od karmina" was released on 15 October 2010, and the video premiered on 20 May 2011.

== Track listing ==
1. Fali mi ljubav
2. Sedam subota (featuring Aca Lukas)
3. Nije od karmina
4. Tijana
5. Greška
6. Od vina si me opila
7. Ja i ti
8. Koliko puta kažem neću
9. Lanjski snijegovi
