= Pakt s Đavolom =

Pakt s Đavolom Deal with the Devil

Studio album by Jala Brat and Buba Corelli
- Released: 13 December 2014
- Recorded: 2013–14
- Genre: Rap; Hip hop
- Label: Tempo Production; RedEye Vision
- Producer: Jasmin Fazlić; Amar Hodžić

Jala Brat chronology
Sin City (2013)	Pakt s Đavolom (2014)	Kruna (2016)

Buba Corelli chronology
Sin City (2013)	Pakt s Đavolom (2014)	Kruna (2016)

Singles from Pakt s Đavolom
- 1. "Bez tebe" Released: 16 November 2014; 2. "22" Released: 13 December 2014; 3. "Trinidad i Tobago" Released: 7 March 2015; 4. "Borba" Released: 8 April 2015

Pakt s Đavolom (Deal with the Devil) is a collaborative album by Bosnian rappers Jala Brat and Buba Corelli. It was released 13 December 2014 through Tempo Production and the RedEye Vision Studio. It is their second project together following the EP Sin City (2013).

== Background ==
Jala Brat and Buba Corelli collaborated on the EP Sin City, released in March 2013. Soon after, they began recording sessions for a studio album which evolved into the LP Pakt s Đavolom.

== Singles ==
The album's lead single "Bez tebe" premiered 16 November 2014. The follow-up single "22" was officially released the same day as the album. The album produced two more hit singles "Trinidad i Tobago" and "Borba".

== Release ==
The full studio album was released by the label Tempo Production on 13 December 2014.

== Track listing ==
#	Title	Featured guest(s)	Translation
1	Da mi je		I Wish
2	22		22
3	Trinidad i Tobago		Trinidad and Tobago
4	Kao ja	Sedž Matoruga	Like Me
5	Geto Majke	Juice	Ghetto Mothers
6	Led	Sedž Matoruga	Ice
7	Borba		Battle
8	Pleši		Dance
9	Molotovljev Koktel		Molotov cocktail
10	Boing	Rasta	Boeing
11	Hladnokrvna Ubica		Cold-Blooded Killer
12	Advokat	McN	Lawyer
13	Bez tebe		Without You
