= Goga Sekulić =

Serbian singer (born 1977)

Goga Sekulić Гога Секулић
- Born: Gordana Sekulić; 27 February 1977 (age 49); Pljevlja, SR Montenegro, SFR Yugoslavia
- Genres: Turbo-folk
- Occupation: Singer
- Instrument: Vocal
- Years active: 2000–present
- Labels: City; Best; Gold; Grand

Gordana Sekulić (Serbian Cyrillic: Гордана Секулић; born 27 February 1977), better known as Goga Sekulić, is a Montenegrin-born Serbian singer. Since making her recording debut in 2000, she has released nine studio albums. Sekulić is best-known for her songs "Gaćice", "Sexy Biznismen", "Tvoje oči" (2004) and "Rekord sam oborila" (2014).

== Life and career ==
Sekulić was born on 27 February 1977, in Pljevlja in today's Montenegro, but was raised in Belgrade. She studied economics and banking in business school.

Sekulić rose to prominence with the release of her debut album, Ljubavnica, under City Records in 2000. After signing for Grand Production, she gained more popularity with the release her albums Gaćice (2006) and Zlatna koka (2008), which circulated in 80,000 and 150,000 units, respectively. These albums produced her stand out songs like "Gaćice", "Tvoje oči" featuring Osman Hadžić and "Seksi biznismen". In 2007, Sekulić competed on the first celebrity season of Veliki Brat, where she placed 6th.

In 2010, she released Ja sam probala sve under Gold Music, which was sold in 10,000 copies. The album spawned her hit song "Muška lutka". Sekulić was a contestant on the 2014 Pink Music Festival with the entry "Rekord sam oborila". The song was later included to her eighth album Ponovo rođena, released under City Records. Ponovo rođena was sold in 50,000 copies.

== Public image ==
Sekulić sued Serbian Playboy magazine for misrepresenting a nude model on their March 2004 cover as her. Ultimately, Sekulić won the lawsuit and reportedly received one million Serbian dinars in compensation, which was described as the highest compensation in the history of the Serbian judiciary.

In 2012, Sekulić was featured in the Guide to the Balkans series by Vice as a representative of the Serbian turbo-folk scene. Dissatisfied with her portrayal in the documentary, Sekulić threatened with defamation lawsuits. Her quote "Reći ću samo, vidimo se na sudu!" (All I am going to say is "See you in court!") has since become a popular internet meme.

In September 2022, American artist Ashnikko cited "Seksi biznismen" as an inspiration for her album Weedkiller.

== Personal life ==
In May 2013, Sekulić married businessman Igor Ramović. Two months after their wedding, Ramović died from pancreatic cancer.

While married to Serbian Brazilian jiu-jitsu competitor, Uroš Domanović, she welcomed her son in 2018. Sekulić divorced from Damanović in 2022.

== Discography ==
Studio albums, EPs

- Ljubavnica (2000)
- I lepša i bolja (2001)
- Opasno po zivot (2002)
- Po zakonu (2003)
- Gaćice (2006)
- Zlatna koka (2008)
- Ja sam probala sve (2011)
- Ponovo rođena (2014)
- Psihologija (2024)

== Filmography ==
List of performances of Goga Sekulić
| Year | Title | Genre | Role | Notes |
|---|---|---|---|---|
| 2007 | Veliki Brat | Television | Herself (contestant) | VIP Season 1; 6th place |
| 2014 | Pink Music Festival | Television | Herself (contestant) | With "Rekord sam oborila" |
| 2015 | Farma | Television | Herself (contestant) | Season 6; Disqualified |
| 2015 | Pink Music Festival | Television | Herself (contestant) | With "Na tebe da ne liči" |

== See also ==
- Music of Serbia
- Turbo-folk
