= Kraj i tačka =

Single by Dara Bubamara

from the album Biografija
- Released: 31 March 2014
- Genre: Pop-folk; Europop
- Length: 2:58
- Label: Self-released
- Songwriters: Vuksan Bilanović; Dejan Kostić

Dara Bubamara singles chronology
| "Opasan" (2014) | "Kraj i tačka" (2014) | "Uvek kad popijem" (2014) |

"Kraj i tačka" ("The End and Period") is a song recorded by Serbian pop recording artist Dara Bubamara. It was premiered 31 March 2014 on the television show Narod pita hosted by Saša Popović on Grand Television. The lyrics were written by Vuksan Bilanović, with music by Dejan Kostić who also arranged the song. It was produced and recorded in Belgrade.
