= Maya (Maya Berović album) =

Studio album by Maya Berović
- Released: 17 February 2011
- Recorded: 2010–11: Belgrade; Zemun
- Genre: dance; dance-pop; pop folk
- Label: BN Music
- Producer: D.K. Struja

Maya Berović chronology
Crno zlato (2008)	Maya (2011)	Djevojka sa juga (2012)

Singles from Maya
- 1. "Djevojačko prezime" Released: 8 February 2011; 2. "Voljela sam s tobom sve" Released: 2011; 3. "Kaldrma" Released: 2011; 4. "Amajlija" Released: 2011

Maya is the third studio album by Bosnian-Serbian pop star Maya Berović. It was released under BN Music on 17 February 2011.

== Background ==
Two months after the release of her second studio album Crno zlato (2008), Maya debuted a self-released non-album single "Koliko te ludo volim ja" (Madly in Love with You) in February 2009. Soon after, she began work on her third studio album under the Bosnian record label BN Music, based in Bijeljina.

== Singles ==
Her big professional breakthrough came upon the release of her third and eponymous album and the success of the lead single, the feminist ballad "Djevojačko prezime" (English: Maiden Name), released 8 February 2011. The plot of the music video has a 'violence against women' theme and Maya wore makeup to mimic a black eye, suffered at the hands of her fictional alcoholic boyfriend. The video was directed by Bosnian-Swiss director Haris Dubica and premiered on 13 May 2011. It was filmed in Lucerne, Switzerland and featured French, Swiss, Croatian and Australian actors. In December 2011, the song won multiple regional awards and was the recipient of the "Hit of the Year" award in Sarajevo.

The albums other singles were upbeat pop-folk songs which were perceived well by critics and her fans.

== Track listing ==
No.	Title	Writer(s)	Producer(s)	Length
1.	"Kaldrma" (Sampietrini)	Miodrag Ž. Ilić	D.K. Struja	4:14
2.	"Ženski mangup" (Female Hooligan)	Pera Stokanović	Pera Stokanović	3:40
3.	"Djevojačko prezime" (Maiden Name)	Pera Stokanović	D.K. Struja	3:41
4.	"Voljela sam s tobom sve" (I Loved Everything with You)	Miodrag Ž. Ilić	D.K. Struja	3:09
5.	"Laka meta" (Easy Target)	Bilja Spasić	Goran Radinović	3:54
6.	"Ako ne molim ne znači da ne volim" (Just Because I Don't Beg Doesn't Mean I Don't Love)	Vlada & Čarli	S. Stefanović Slavkoni	3:25
7.	"Pjevala bih da mi se ne plače" (I Would Sing If I Didn't Want to Cry)	Miodrag Ž. Ilić	D.K. Struja	3:51
8.	"Čestitam ti" (Congratulations)	Miodrag Ž. Ilić	D.K. Struja	3:58
9.	"Nemogući spoj" (Impossible Connection)	Miodrag Ž. Ilić	D.K. Struja	3:13
10.	"Najveća ljubav tvoja" (Your Biggest Love)		S. Stefanović Slavkoni	3:56
11.	"Amajlija" (Talisman)	Pera Stokanović	D.K. Struja	3:31

== Personnel ==
=== Instruments ===
- Dejan Kostić – backing vocals
- Slavko Stefanović – backing vocals, keyboards
- Ivana Selakov – backing vocals
- Pera Stokanović – backing vocals
- Snežana Aga – backing vocals
- D.K. Struja – accordion (1, 3, 4, 8, 11), keyboards
- S. Stefanović Slavkoni – accordion (6, 10)
- Petar Trumbetaš – acoustic guitar, electric guitar
- Dragan Trnavac Trne – bass guitar (5, 6, 10)
- Joca Stefanović – keyboards
- Đorđe Janković – keyboards
- Žikica Jovanović Sremac – violin

=== Production and recording ===
- D.K. Struja – arranging, producing, programming (1, 2, 3, 4, 7, 8, 9, 11)
- S. Stefanović Slavkoni – arrangement, production, programming, engineering (post-production) (6, 10)
- Đorđe Janković – mixing (1, 2, 3, 4, 7, 8, 9, 11)
- Joca Stefanović – programming (6, 10)

=== Crew ===
- Biljana Živadinović – hair
- Tijana Todorović – styling
- Srđan Petković – makeup
- Andreja Damnjanović – photography
