= Leti ptico slobodno =

Single by Maya Berović

from the album Djevojka sa juga
- Released: 25 June 2012
- Genre: Pop-ballad
- Length: 3:46
- Label: City Records
- Songwriter: Dragiša Baša
- Producer: Dejan Abadić

Maya Berović singles chronology
"Amajlija" (2011)	"Leti ptico slobodno" (2012)	"Mama mama" (2012)

"Leti ptico slobodno" (English: Fly Bird Freely) is a song recorded by Bosnian pop star Maya Berović. It was released 25 June 2012 and served as the lead single from her fourth studio album Djevojka sa juga. The song was written by Dragiša Baša.

The song is a ballad about a crumbling relationship. Following promotion for the single, Maya and her boyfriend Alen vacationed in Varadero, Cuba for two weeks prior to the release of the album.

The music video was planned to be filmed on the Croatian Brijuni Islands, but was instead filmed in a studio. The video had its premiere on Maya's YouTube channel on 20 October 2012.
