= Pogledom te skidam =

Single by Bojan Bjelić featuring Dara Bubamara

from the album Prva rezerva
- Released: 27 May 2012
- Recorded: April 2012: Studio "Bojan Bjelić"
- Genre: Pop; Europop
- Length: 3:00
- Label: Self-release; City Records
- Songwriters: Miloš Roganović; Filip Miletić
- Producer: Bojan Bjelić

Bojan Bjelić singles chronology
| "Duh iz bombonjere" (2008) | "Pogledom te skidam" (2012) | "Prva rezerva" (2013) |

Dara Bubamara singles chronology
| "Galama" (2011) | "Pogledom te skidam" (2012) | "Delete" (2012) |

"Pogledom te skidam" ("Undressing You with My Eyes") is a song recorded by Serbian recording artist Bojan Bjelić featuring pop star Dara Bubamara. It was released 27 May 2012 and was featured as a bonus track on his third studio album Prva rezerva, released by City Records 6 December 2013. The song was written by Miloš Roganović and Filip Miletić. It was produced and recorded in Belgrade.

The music video was directed by Ivan Code and premiered the same day as the song.
