= Karera (Dara Bubamara song) =

Single by Dara Bubamara

from the album Biografija
- Released: 13 October 2014
- Genre: Pop; Europop
- Length: 3:48
- Label: Self-released
- Songwriters: Stefan Đurić; Slobodan Veljković
- Producer: Exitown

Dara Bubamara singles chronology
"Uvek kad popijem" (2014)	"Karera" (2014)	"Nepopravljiva" (2014)

"Karera" (Carrera) is a song recorded by Serbian pop recording artist Dara Bubamara. It was self-released 13 October 2014. The song was written by Stefan Đurić and Slobodan Veljković. It was produced and recorded in Belgrade.

The song's title comes from the Porsche Carrera car. The music video, shot in New Belgrade, premiered the same day as the song and featured Bubamara dancing on top of her white Carrera in a transparent blouse and fishnet stockings. Serbian newspaper Telegraf said that the video looked "more like a commercial for the German car" than a music video. Bubamara said the song was "autobiographical" and that the lyrics refers to her "enemies and some journalists". Before its release, Bubamara said that "Karera" would "go above modern standards."
