= Gaetano de Vito =

Italian painter

Gaetano de Vito (9 June 1884 – 7 February 1964) was an Italian painter.

== Biography ==
Gaetano de Vito was born in San Salvo in the province of Chieti of Abruzzo. Educated in the elementary school of San Salvo and the Middle School of Vasto, he moved to study at the technical institute in Taormina, Sicily. From there he enrolled at the Royal Institute of Fine Arts in Naples, initially under Filippo Palizzi. After graduating, in 1914, he obtained a teacher's degree at the Scuole Tecniche. He was named professor of Design for the Scuole Tecniche of Chieti.

He joined the army during the World War I and distinguished himself as a sub-lieutenant in the Battle for Monte Grappa. He was awarded a Medal of Bronze and a Cross of War. Between the two World Wars he could no longer practice his profession of art teacher because of its opposition to fascist ideology. He was also proposed to be sent to "confino" (i.e. sent away from the city) for the same reason. During World War II, he served as a captain in the army with the role of commander of a local garrison. After the liberation of San Salvo from the Nazi occupation, he served as the mayor of San Salvo from 1943 to 1945. He was chosen for this role by the local allied force command in virtue of his ideological opposition to fascism. He befriended the painter Luigi Martella, poet Romualdo Pantini, among the cultured salons of Vasto. During the 1950s and 1960s, he was named giudice conciliatore onorario (a particular kind of judge) of Vasto.

After the war, he permanently left teaching and dedicated himself to painting rural scenes, inspired by Palizzi. He died of a sudden heart attack in his home in San Salvo.
