= Imperia (record label) =

Bosnian record label

- Founded: 2019; 6 years ago
- Founder: Jala Brat, Buba Corelli
- Status: active
- Genre: Trap; turbofolk
- Location: Sarajevo, Bosnia and Herzegovina
- Official website: imperia.ba

Imperia (stylized in all caps) is a Bosnian record label, which was founded by Sarajevo musicians, Jala Brat and Buba Corelli.

== History ==
The company was founded in the beginning of 2019 in Sarajevo, Bosnia and Herzegovina by Sarajevo musicians and music producers, Jala Brat and Buba Corelli. The idea of Imperia was made real in 2006 in the form of a YouTube channel, which over time evolved to a record label and media company. In 2019, the company was centralized under one parent company, under which operate several subsidiares, such as Imperia TV, Imperia Clothing and Euromedia Broadcasting Limited. The company also operates in TV production, audio distribution and visual content, and publishes content on YouTube, Facebook and Instagram.

== Genres ==
Imperia distributes world genres, such as pop, trap, and turbofolk.

== Artists ==
- Jala Brat
- Buba Corelli
- Maya Berović
- mirko matic
- Inas
- Igor Buzov
- Klijent
