= Galama =

Single by Dara Bubamara

from the album Dara 2013
- Released: 26 April 2011
- Genre: Pop; Europop
- Length: 3:31
- Label: Self-released; City Records
- Composer: DJ Kim
- Lyricist: Marina Tucaković

Dara Bubamara singles chronology
"Noć za nas" (2011)	"Galama" (2011)	"Pogledom te skidam" (2012)

"Galama" (Serbian Cyrillic: Галама, lit. 'Noise') is a song recorded by Serbian pop recording artist Dara Bubamara. It was released 26 April 2011 and was featured as a bonus track on her twelfth studio album Dara 2013, released by City Records. The lyrics were written by Marina Tucaković and the song was arranged by composer Aleksandar Kobac, with music by DJ Kim from France. It was produced and recorded in Belgrade. A week after its release, "Galama" was chosen as Hit of Day by Radio Svet. The music video, directed by Nikola Kesić, premiered 19 June 2011.

The song is a Serbian remake of "Ray Rayi" by the Moroccan rapper Nocif featuring singer Cheb Rayan. The song's composer was initially listed as Bane Opačić. However, after reports in Serbian media that the song was plagiarized from "Ray Rayi", Opačić denied ever taking credit for the composition. Instead, he stated that Bubamara's then-husband Milan Kesić hired him to adapt "Ray Rayi" for her because it is originally a hip-hop song. He also revealed that Bubamara was originally supposed to record the song with an unnamed French artist, but that there was a change of plan and she decided to record it herself.

On 21 April 2018, Dara Bubamara performed the song live at her first major solo concert at the Belgrade Arena as a duet with Jelena Karleuša. For the performance, they recorded a new backdrop video parodying their recently ended media feud. The feud was later renewed.
