= Dado Polumenta =

Dado Polumenta Дадо Полумента
- Born: Damir Polumenta; 29 August 1982 (age 44); Bijelo Polje, SR Montenegro, SFR Yugoslavia
- Genre: Pop-folk
- Occupation: singer
- Instrument: Vocals
- Years active: 2000–present
- Spouse: Selma Mekić (m. 2012; div. 2013)

Damir "Dado" Polumenta (Montenegrin: Дамир "Дадо" Полумента; born 29 August 1982) is a Montenegrin pop-folk recording artist.

== Life and career ==
Polumenta was born into a Bosniak family in Bijelo Polje, in northern Montenegro. His uncle Šako Polumenta is also a singer. In 2008, they released a duet single "Ljepša od noći" (More Beautiful Than Night) on Šako's album Sanjao sam san....

His first album, Jasmina, released in 2001 through the label Best Records, found little success. However, after a hiatus, Dado became prominent in the Balkans music industry after the release of his second album 100 stepeni (2005) under the label Grand Production.

In due course, he left Grand Production and, through his uncle, signed with Gold Music and recorded Volim te... (2007). On 26 June 2008, Dado released a single, a ballad titled "Moja srno", which was performed in the "Vogošća Festival 2008" in Bosnia and Herzegovina. Polumenta's fourth studio album Zauvijek tvoj was released 15 December 2008.

Polumenta released his fifth studio album Buntovnik (Rebel) on 18 November 2010 under Grand Production, his second project with the label.

== Personal life ==
Polumenta has a son named Dorijan with Serbian model Anamarija Kikoš, with whom he lived for three years. She was his unmarried partner at the time but they broke up shortly after the child was born.

Polumenta is a practicing Muslim. His wedding to his first wife Selma Mekić in her hometown Novi Pazar on 12 December 2012 was in accordance with the Islamic faith. They divorced in June 2013. Polumeta had a daughter, Alea Polumenta on 25 October 2017 with his fiancé Ivona Ivković.

== Discography ==
- Jasmina (2001)
- 100 stepeni (2005)
- Volim te... (2007)
- Zauvijek tvoj (2008)
- Buntovnik (2010)
- Virus (2011)
- Ne dam ja na tebe (2013)
- Alea (2023)
