= Dara Bubamara =

Serbian singer (born 1976)

Dara Bubamara Дара Бубамара
- Born: Radojka Adžić; 21 May 1976 (age 50); Novi Sad, SR Serbia, Yugoslavia
- Genres: Turbo-folk
- Occupation: Singer
- Instrument: Vocals
- Years active: 1993–present
- Labels: PGP-RTS; ZaM; Best; Grand; K::CN; IDJ Tunes; City
- Formerly of: Dara Bubamara Show Band

Radojka Adžić (Serbian Cyrillic: Радојка Аџић; born 21 May 1976), better known as Dara Bubamara (lit. 'Dara the Ladybug'), is a Serbian singer from Novi Sad. She came to prominence as a member of the Dara Bubamara Show Band. Since debuting as a solo artist in 1995, Dara has released 13 studio albums. Her best-known songs include "Ja neću da ga vidim" (1996), "Vero, nevero" (2003), "Zidovi" (2007), "Opasan" and "Karera" (2014).

== Early life ==
Radojka Adžić was born on 21 May 1976 in Novi Sad, SFR Yugoslavia. She comes from a working class family. Adžić showed interest in music from an early age by appearing on popular children's variety shows. As a child, Dara also opened for Lepa Lukić at her concert in Zrenjanin. Furthermore, Adžić stated that she took home the first prize at the Zmaj Children Games. According to the media, she dropped out from high school, but Adžić has claimed otherwise.

== Career ==
Adžić began her career as a member of the Vojvodina-based Dara Bubamara Show band, from which she got her stage name. They released one studio album, titled Košava sa Dunava, in 1993. Dara pursued a solo career with her debut album, Dosada, which was released under PGP-RTS in 1995. In the following years, she released three more albums under ZaM, featuring stand-out songs "Ja neću da ga vidim" and "Svi su tu kao nekada". Her self-titled fifth album was released in 2001 through Best Records.

In 2003, she released Polje jagoda under Grand Production. Bubamara subsequently released two more albums under the label: Bez milosti (2005) and Dodirni me (2007). The latter was sold in 300,000 copies, making it one of her most commercially successful releases. During her time in Grand, Adžić gained significant popularity with the hit songs like "Polje jagoda", "Vero nevero", "Javite mi, javite", "Dodirni me" and "Zidovi". In 2009, it was reported that Dara alongside several other singers had been dropped from Grand Production.

In September 2010, Adžić promoted the album Sangrija, released under K::CN Records. It was sold in 30,000 copies. The following album, titled Dara 2013, was released through City Records in April 2013. It was preceded by the singles "Galama" (2011) and "Delete" (2012). Dara 2013 was sold in 50,000 units. In May 2015, Dara competed in the second Pink Music Festival with the song "Žena zmaj", receiving the Audience Award. In March the following year she was announced as a contestant on the third season of the television show Tvoje lice zvuči poznato, where she ultimately finished in 8th place. Adžić subsequently became a judge on the singing competition Pinkove Zvezde. Her twelfth studio album Biografija was released under City Records in May 2017. It was sold in 50,000 copies. The album also included previously released standalone singles like "Opasan", "Kraj i tačka", "Karera" and "Volim sve što vole mladi". In April 2018, Dara held her first solo concert in the Belgrade Arena to 15,000 people. Jelena Karleuša was a guest performer at the concert and joined Dara for the song "Galama".

== Personal life ==
In March 2002, Dara married Lazar Dugalić. During their relationship, Dugalić was arrested for car theft in Germany.

In 2008, Adžić married Serbian-born French businessman, Milan Kesić. The couple welcomed their son on 2 January 2009. After incidents of her intimate photos leaking to the press and reports of having extramarital affairs, in September 2016, Adžić stated that she had been divorced from Kesić a year prior.

== Discography ==
Solo albums

- Košava sa Dunava (1993)
- Dosada (1995)
- Ja neću da ga vidim (1996)
- Dunav (1997)
- Nisu to kiše (1999)
- Dvojnica (2001)
- Polje jagoda (2003)
- Bez milosti (2005)
- Dodirni me (2007)
- Sangrija (2010)
- Dara 2013 (2013)
- Biografija (2017)
- 2025 (2025)

== Filmography ==
Filmography of Dara Bubamara
Year	Title	Genre	Role	Notes
1995	Snovi od Šper ploče	Television	Neighbor Dara	Season 1; Episode 1
2016	Tvoje lice zvuči poznato	Television	Herself (contestant)	Season 3; 8th place
2016-2017	DarReality	Television	Herself	Season of 12 episodes
2016–2017	Pinkove Zvezde	Television	Herself (judge)	Season 3
2025-present	Zvezde Granda	Television	Herself (judge)	
