= Šako Polumenta =

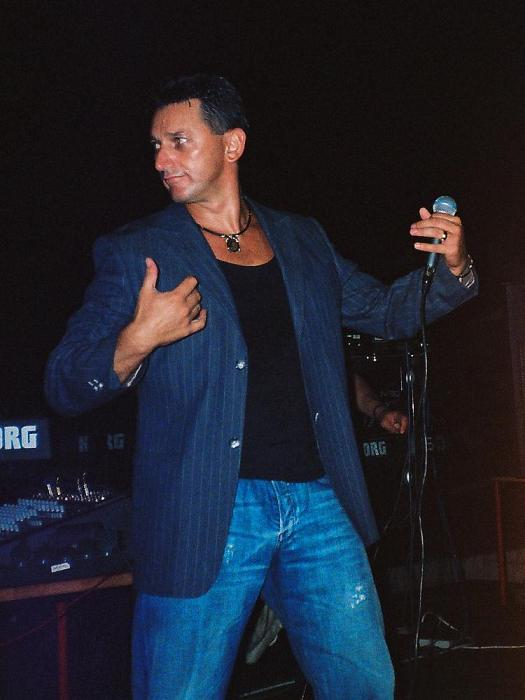
- Polumenta performing in 2010s

Background information
- Born: 27 March 1961 (age 65); Bijelo Polje, PR Montenegro, FNR Yugoslavia
- Genres: Pop-folk, Folk
- Occupation: Singer
- Years active: 1993–present
- Label: Gold Music (2002–present)

Sakib "Šako" Polumenta (born 27 March 1961) is a Montenegrin pop-folk singer popular throughout the former Yugoslav republics.

== Personal and early life ==
Polumenta was born into a Bosniak family in Bijelo Polje, a municipality of northern Montenegro (then part of Yugoslavia).

He is married to Vesna, whom he has been in a relationship with for 15 years (as of 2013).

He has a daughter, Rijalda (b. 1989), who married in 2012.

He is the paternal uncle of well-known singer Dado Polumenta, whose career he helped launch.

At early stage of his career he used to sing in Serbian Ekavian dialect which was uncommon for his homeland Montenegro but that made him gain wide popularity.

== Career ==
He began his career in 1993. He has several housings in Podgorica, Belgrade, Ulcinj. He often sings at the Belgrade splav (river boat) "River". He is known for combining pop music with traditional Balkan musical styles.

Polumenta gained significant media attention following a scandal involving a relationship with a younger woman who was reported to have been 16 years old at the time. The controversy severely affected his public image and nearly ended his career.

== Discography ==
Studio albums

- Ej, sudbino (1993)
- Skitnica (1995)
- Hej, ženo (1997)
- Aman, aman (1999)
- Od ljubavi oslepeo (2000)
- Dišem za tebe (2002)
- Uvijek blizu (2004)
- Karta za budućnost (2006)
- Sanjao sam san... (2008)
- Heroj... (2011)
- Sve je samo tren (2015)

As featured artist

- Gde god pođem tebi idem (2006) with Stoja on her album, Metak

== Awards and nominations ==
Year	Award	Category	Nominee(s)	Result	Ref.
2001	Montefon Awards	Folk Singer of the Year	Himself	Won	
