= Jala Brat =

Bosnian musician, songwriter and producer

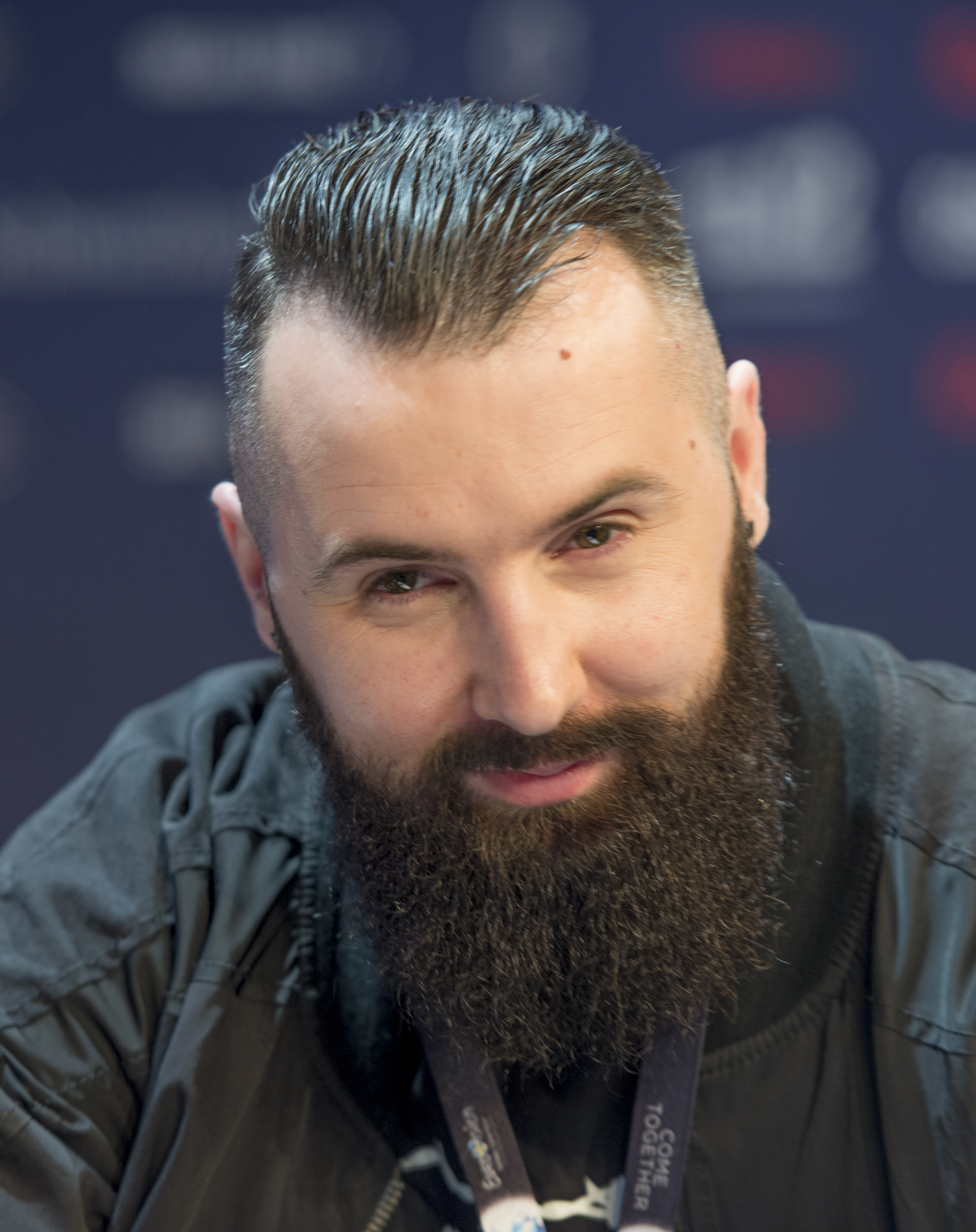
- Jala Brat in 2016
- Born: Jasmin Fazlić; 16 October 1986 (age 40); Sarajevo, SR Bosnia and Herzegovina, SFR Yugoslavia
- Occupations: Musician; songwriter; music producer; entrepreneur; rapper
- Years active: 2000–present
- Spouse: Alma Ikanović (m. 2017)
- Musical career
- Genres: Trap; mumble trap; turbo-folk; Electronic; Dance; hip-hop
- Instrument: Vocals
- Years active: 2000–present
- Label: IMPERIA

Jasmin Fazlić (born 16 October 1986), known by his stage name Jala Brat, is a Bosnian rapper, songwriter, and record producer. He has released several studio albums and is known for collaborating with another Bosnian rapper Buba Corelli, with whom he founded the record label Imperia.

== Career ==
Jala Brat started making rap music in the early 2000s in his improvised home studio. He initially worked alone, later forming a hip-hop group BluntBylon with underground rappers such as Smayla and others, releasing songs and mixtapes on Youtube. Jala Brat released his first EP Replay in 2011, collaborating with several other rappers, including his first collaboration with Buba Corelli. He produces music with a hybrid genre that media outlets have occasionally labeled trap folk.

Jala Brat represented Bosnia and Herzegovina in the Eurovision Song Contest 2016 by co-writing and performing "Ljubav je" together with Dalal, Deen and Ana Rucner.

=== Personal life ===
During the 2016 Bosnian municipal elections, Jala Brat ventured into politics by running for a seat on the Municipal Council representing the Party of Democratic Action (SDA).

== Discography ==
=== Studio albums ===
- Riječ na riječ (2012)
- Pakt s Đavolom, with Buba Corelli (2014)
- Stari Radio, with Buba Corelli (2016)
- Kruna, with Buba Corelli (2016)
- Alfa & Omega, with Buba Corelli (2019)
- Futura (2021)
- GoodFellas, with Buba Corelli (2023)
- Goat Season: Final Chapter, with Buba Corelli (2024)
- Roze suze, with Buba Corelli (2025)
- Godzilla, with Buba Corelli (2026)

=== Compilation albums ===
- Imperia Remixes, Vol. 1, with Buba Corelli (2018)
- Jala Brat & Buba Corelli Remixes, Vol. 1, with Buba Corelli (2018)
- Imperia Remixes, Vol. 2, with Buba Corelli (2020)
- Best Imperia Collabs, with Buba Corelli (2020)
- Imperia Remixes, Vol. 3, with Buba Corelli (2021)

=== Extended plays ===
- Replay (2011)
- Mahala, with Shtela (2012)
- Sin City, with Buba Corelli (2013)
- 99 (2019)
- Goat Season (Part One), with Buba Corelli (2024)
- Goat Season (Part Two), with Buba Corelli (2024)

=== Singles ===
==== As lead artist ====
Title	Year	Peak chart positions				Certifications	Album
Title	Year	AUT	CRO Billb.	GER	SUI	Certifications	Album
"Plijen" (with Buba Corelli)	2013	—	*	—	—		Non-album single
"Bad"	2017	—	*	—	—		Alfa & Omega
"Glamur"	2017	—	*	—	—		Non-album single
"Ultimatum" (with Buba Corelli)	2017	—	*	—	—		Alfa & Omega
"Mlada i luda"	2017	—	*	—	—		Alfa & Omega
"Nema bolje" (with Buba Corelli and RAF Camora)	2017	40	*	—	—	IFPI AUT: Platinum	Alfa & Omega
"Mafia" (with Buba Corelli)	2018	—	*	—	—		Alfa & Omega
"Ona'e" (with Buba Corelli and Coby)	2018	—	*	—	—	IFPI AUT: Platinum	Alfa & Omega
"O kako ne bi"	2018	—	*	—	—		Alfa & Omega
"Benga po snijegu" (with Buba Corelli and Rasta)	2018	—	*	—	—		Alfa & Omega
"Mila" (with Buba Corelli)	2019	—	*	—	—		Alfa & Omega
"Bebi" (with Buba Corelli)	2019	—	*	—	—		Alfa & Omega
"Kamikaza" (with Buba Corelli featuring Senidah)	2019	42	*	—	—	IFPI AUT: Gold	Alfa & Omega
"Mat"	2019	—	*	—	—		Non-album singles
"Karantin" (with Buba Corelli)	2020	—	*	—	—		Non-album singles
"Partijam"	2020	—	*	—	—		Futura
"Divljam" (with Buba Corelli and Coby)	2021	35	6	—	—	IFPI AUT: Gold	Non-album singles
"Trči"	2021	—	*	—	—		Non-album singles
"Roze" (with Devito and Buba Corelli)	2021	60	2	—	—	IFPI AUT: Gold	Non-album singles
"Criminal" (with Buba Corelli and RAF Camora)	2022	1	1	36	18	IFPI AUT: Gold	Non-album singles
"Warsaw" (with Buba Corelli)	2022	—	1	—	—		Non-album singles
"Coco" (with Buba Corelli)	2022	55	1	—	—		Non-album singles
"LaMelo" (with Buba Corelli)	2022	73	1	—	—		Non-album singles
"Terenac" (with Buba Corelli featuring 381, Ajdin, Brzo Trči Ljanmi, Doxvids, LayZ, Limalenski, Medico, Neo24h, Papyaleksa, Realcandyboy, Sergej Pajić, Superbabekillah, Svejekei, Vaniofficial and Zevin)	2022	—	—	—	—		Non-album singles
"Coco 2.0" (with Buba Corelli and RAF Camora featuring Dardan)	2022	50	—	87	71	IFPI AUT: Gold	Non-album singles
"Shake It" (with Devito)	2022	—	5	—	—		Non-album singles
"Karamel" (with Buba Corelli and Devito)	2023	23	2	—	—		Non-album singles
"S.O.S." (with Buba Corelli and DJ Architect)	2023	52	1	—	—		Non-album singles
"Da li si me" (with Buba Corelli)	2023	52	2	—	—		Non-album singles
"GoodFellas" (with Buba Corelli and FT Kings)	2023	—	13	—	—		GoodFellas
"Désolé" (with Kalash Criminel)	2023	—	—	—	—		GoodFellas
"Dans la tess" (with Ghetto Phénomène)	2023	—	—	—	—		Best Of
"Padam" (with Buba Corelli and Baby its Pablo)	2023	—	3	—	—		GoodFellas
"Randevu"	2023	—	23	—	—		Goat Season (Part One)
"Ona nije ja :)" (Remix) (with Hava and Buba Corelli)	2024	—	—	—	—		Non-album singles
"Go Go (Challenge)" (with Buba Corelli and Lima Len)	2024	—	—	—	—		Non-album singles
"Gori more" (with Igor Buzov)	2024	—	—	—	—		Non-album singles
"Dumdum" (with Klijent and Buba Corelli)	2025	—	6	—	—		Non-album singles
"Don Diego" (RMX) (with Buba Corelli and Gims)	2025	23	2	—	—		Non-album singles
"101 zmija" (with Teodora)	2025	—	20	—	—		Non-album singles
"Ku*ka mala sebična" (with Igor Buzov and Buba Corelli)	2025	—	22	—	—		Non-album singles
"Ajkula"	2026	17	2	—	—		Godzilla
"Glasine" (with Klijent)	2026	—	2	—	—		Non-album singles
"Shalala" (with Buba Corelli and Elena)	2026	—	1	—	—		Non-album singles
"Barcelona" (with Buba Corelli)	2026	—	1	—	—		Non-album singles
"—" denotes a recording that did not chart. "*" denotes a recording released before the chart's launch.

==== As featured artist ====
Title	Year	Peak chart positions	Album
Title	Year	AUT	Album
"Bajram" (Makk featuring Jala Brat)	2013	—	Non-album singles
"Ronin" (Destro featuring Jala Brat, Fox and Đare)	2016	—	Non-album singles
"Deus ex machina" (Destro featuring Jala Brat)	2016	—	Non-album singles
"#FreeDemBoyz" (Mikan featuring Klijent, Jala Brat and Arma)	2016	—	Non-album singles
"21" (Mikan featuring SMA, Tanjo and Jala Brat)	2016	—	Non-album singles
"Ljubav je" / "Love Is All" (Dalal Midhat and Deen featuring Ana Rucner and Jala)	2016	—	Rane manje bole
"To me radi" (Maya Berović featuring Jala Brat and Buba Corelli)	2016	—	Viktorijina tajna
"Folira" (Elena featuring Jala Brat)	2016	—	Non-album singles
"Ego" (Milan Stanković featuring Jala Brat and Buba Corelli)	2017	—	Non-album singles
"Otrove" (Severina featuring Jala Brat)	2017	—	Halo
"#ImamoProblem3" (King Mire featuring Genocide, Santos, Makk, Jala Brat, SMA, Sheik Ba and Sajfer)	2017	—	Non-album singles
"Bol" (Bosnian Trouble featuring Jala Brat)	2017	—	Non-album singles
"Magija" (Severina featuring Jala Brat)	2018	—	Halo
"Pablo" (Milan Stanković featuring Jala Brat and Buba Corelli)	2020	73	Non-album singles
"Makarov" (Ra Bra featuring Mone and Jala Brat)	2022	—	Non-album singles
"—" denotes a recording that did not chart or was released before the chart was launched.

==== Promotional singles ====
Title	Year	Peak chart positions		Album
Title	Year	AUT	CRO Billb.	Album
"Bijele flaše" (with Elena)	2021	—	*	Futura
"Futura"	2021	—	*	Futura
"Dugme"	2021	—	*	Futura
"Moskva"	2021	—	*	Futura
"Andale"	2021	—	*	Futura
"Noć" (with Hava)	2021	62	8	Futura
"LMTD"	2021	—	*	Futura
"MBM" (with C-Kan)	2021	—	*	Futura
"Pilula" (with Buba Corelli)	2021	—	11	Futura
"Dostojevski" (with Light and Pyrex)	2021	—	23	Futura
"Maria" (with MC Hariel)	2021	—	*	Futura
"OMG" (with Noizy)	2021	—	*	Futura
"Film"	2021	—	*	Futura
"Adrenalina" (featuring Tory Lanez)	2021	—	*	Futura
"10 do 2" (with Buba Corelli and RAF Camora)	2023	36	—	GoodFellas
"Aisha" (with Buba Corelli)	2023	—	—	GoodFellas
"Bad Bitch" (with Buba Corelli)	2023	—	—	GoodFellas
"Dale" (with Buba Corelli and Hava)	2023	38	6	GoodFellas
"Hakimi" (with Buba Corelli)	2023	—	25	GoodFellas
"La Muria" (with Buba Corelli and Baby Gang featuring Higashi)	2023	—	—	GoodFellas
"Marakesh" (with Buba Corelli and Bounty & Cocoa featuring DJ Tomekk)	2023	—	4	GoodFellas
"Savastano" (with Buba Corelli)	2023	—	—	GoodFellas
"Zvijer" (with Buba Corelli)	2023	—	—	GoodFellas
"Puklo nebo" (with Elena and Medi)	2024	—	5	Goat Season (Part One)
"7ice" (with Sajfer and Buba Corelli)	2024	37	4	Anima (Part One)
"U njoj" (with Buba Corelli)	2025	—	10	Roze suze
"Toronto" (with Buba Corelli)	2025	—	3	Roze suze
"TEC-9" (with Buba Corelli)	2025	7	1	Roze suze
"Roze suze" (with Buba Corelli)	2025	42	3	Roze suze
"Numb" (with Buba Corelli and Rick Ross)	2025	31	7	Roze suze
"Military" (with Buba Corelli)	2025	—	4	Roze suze
"Blokada" (with Buba Corelli)	2025	—	2	Roze suze
"Bimmer" (with Buba Corelli)	2025	—	8	Roze suze
"Babylon" (with Buba Corelli)	2025	—	6	Roze suze
"6 ujutru" (with Buba Corelli and Teodora)	2025	32	9	Roze suze
"Zaronim" (with Buba Corelli)	2026	—	10	Godzilla
"Vampiri" (with Buba Corelli)	2026	—	6	Godzilla
"Revansh" (with Buba Corelli)	2026	—	8	Godzilla
"Mufasa" (with Buba Corelli featuring Rasta)	2026	45	4	Godzilla
"Mačje oči" (with Buba Corelli)	2026	—	5	Godzilla
"Godzilla" (with Buba Corelli)	2026	—	2	Godzilla
"Chimaev" (with Buba Corelli)	2026	—	7	Godzilla
"Bass & Rave" (with Buba Corelli)	2026	26	1	Godzilla
"—" denotes a recording that did not chart. "*" denotes a recording released before the chart's launch.

=== Other charted and certified songs ===
Title	Year	Peak chart positions			Certifications	Album
Title	Year	AUT	CRO Billb.	SUI	Certifications	Album
"Klinka" (with Buba Corelli)	2016	—	20	—		Kruna
"Zove Vienna" (with Buba Corelli and RAF Camora)	2019	36	*	—	IFPI AUT: Gold	99
"LaLaLa" (with Olexesh and Buba Corelli)	2019	48	*	95		Augen Husky
"Vajbuje" (Devito featuring Jala Brat and Buba Corelli)	2023	—	5	—		Plava krv
"Rosalia" (with Buba Corelli)	2024	73	2	—		Goat Season (Part One)
"Monster" (with Buba Corelli)	2024	—	3	—		Goat Season (Part One)
"Punta Cana"	2024	—	12	—		Goat Season (Part One)
"Bez koda" (with Buba Corelli)	2024	—	1	—		Goat Season (Part Two)
"Japan" (with Buba Corelli)	2024	—	5	—		Goat Season (Part Two)
"Hollywood" (with Buba Corelli and Rasta)	2024	—	2	—		Goat Season (Part Two)
"Munja" (with Buba Corelli)	2024	—	9	—		Goat Season (Part Two)
"Cataleya" (with Buba Corelli)	2024	—	15	—		Goat Season (Part Two)
"Aritmije" (with Buba Corelli and Severina)	2024	—	24	—		Goat Season (Part Two)
"Blaka, blaka" (with Buba Corelli featuring Elena)	2024	67	1	—		Goat Season: Final Chapter
"Bass" (with Buba Corelli)	2024	—	1	—		Goat Season: Final Chapter
"Sexdrive" (with Buba Corelli)	2024	—	4	—		Goat Season: Final Chapter
"Vrati je tati" (with Buba Corelli)	2024	—	5	—		Goat Season: Final Chapter
"Kingston" (with Buba Corelli)	2024	—	6	—		Goat Season: Final Chapter
"Makarov" (with Buba Corelli)	2024	—	7	—		Goat Season: Final Chapter
"Kehlani" (with Buba Corelli)	2024	—	5	—		Goat Season: Final Chapter
"Blur" (with Buba Corelli)	2024	—	9	—		Goat Season: Final Chapter
"—" denotes a recording that did not chart. "*" denotes a recording released before the chart's launch.

=== Guest appearances ===
List of non-single guest appearances, with other performing artists, showing year released and album name
Title	Year	Other artist(s)	Album
"U komšiluku"	2014	Kontra	Igra riječi
"Tarantinov film"	2015	Makk	Mladi Tarantino
"Volim te"	2015	Klijent	Kripton
"Sanjaju"	2015	Loš Sin, Psiha Delikvento	Najgori od sve djece
"Extazy"	2015	Loš Sin	Najgori od sve djece
"Noćima ga davao"	2015	Loš Sin, Maja Majami	Najgori od sve djece
"Dejan Matić"	2015	Loš Sin	Najgori od sve djece
"Zvezde plaču za nama"	2015	Vuk Mob	Greška
"Balmain"	2017	Maya Berović, Buba Corelli	Viktorijina tajna
"Mala lomi"	2017	Maya Berović, Buba Corelli	Viktorijina tajna
"V.I.P"	2018	Maya Berović	7
"Ožiljci"	2019	Klijent	Retro Collection
"Kao da nemam ništa"	2019	Klijent, Smayla	Retro Collection
"Bacim tal"	2019	Klijent, Kontra	Retro Collection
"LaLaLa"	2019	Olexesh, Buba Corelli	Augen Husky
"Čaše gore"	2022	Enela	Ljubav vodi me
"Vajbuje"	2023	Devito, Buba Corelli	Plava krv
"K.V.P.V."	2023	G-Recordz, Loš Sin	Zulum
"7ice"	2024	Sajfer, Buba Corelli	Anima (Part One)
"Jala Brat Interlude"	2025	Elena	Déjà vu

Preceded by Maya Sar with "Korake ti znam"	Bosnia and Herzegovina in the Eurovision Song Contest; 2016 (with Dalal, Deen and Ana Rucner)	Succeeded by Incumbent
