= Dubravka Đedović =

Serbian politician (born 1978)

Dubravka Đedović Handanović
- Дубравка Ђедовић Хандановић
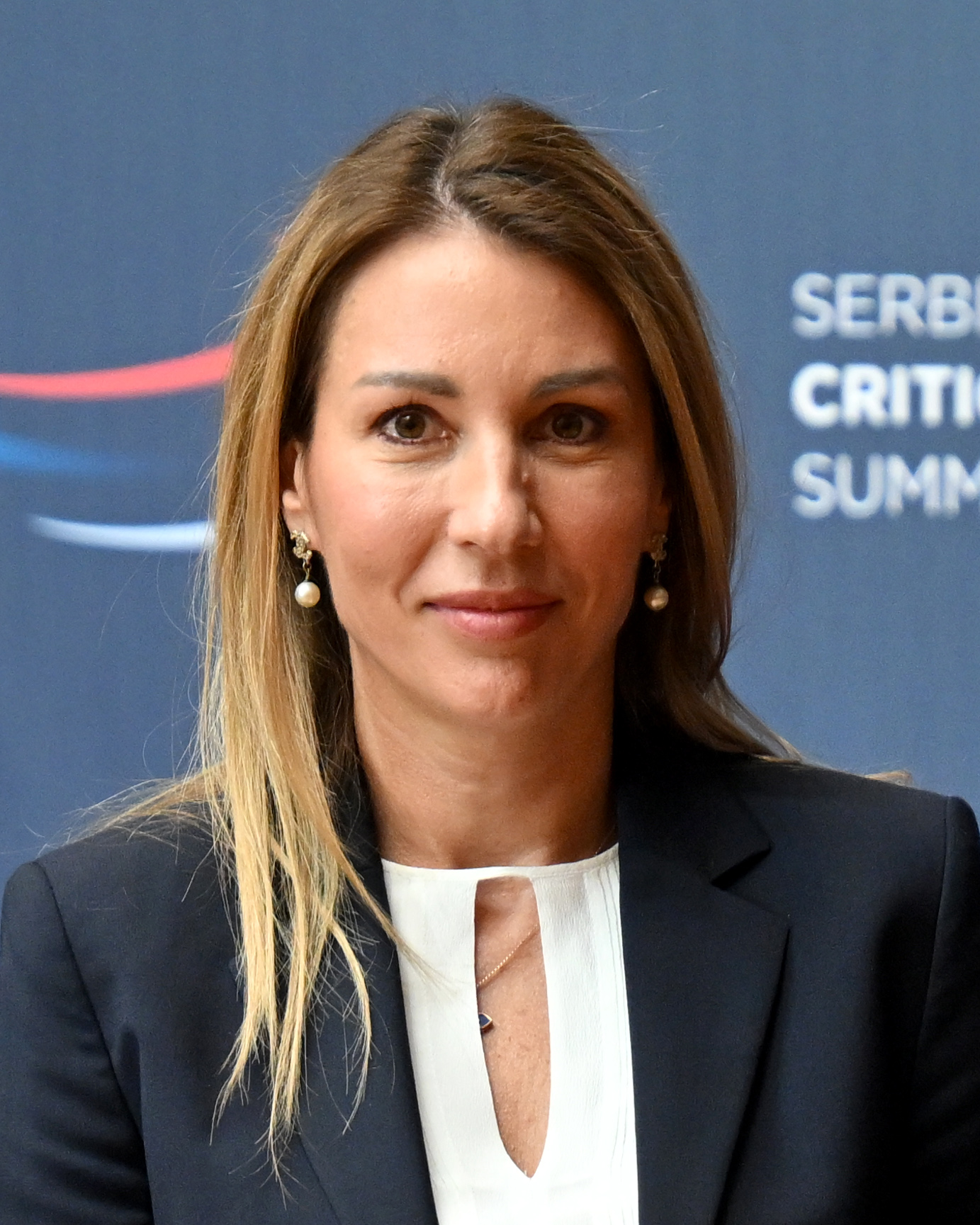
- Đedović Handanović in 2024

Minister of Mining and Energy
- Incumbent
- Assumed office 26 October 2022
- Prime Minister: Ana Brnabić; Ivica Dačić (acting); Miloš Vučević; Đuro Macut
- Preceded by: Zorana Mihajlović

Personal details
- Born: 6 November 1978 (age 47) Belgrade, SR Serbia, SFR Yugoslavia
- Party: Independent
- Spouse(s): Christophe Nègre (div. 2020) Damir Handanović (m. 2023)
- Children: 4
- Education: Faculty of Economics; Bocconi University; UCLA Anderson School of Management
- Profession: Banker; financer; television producer

Dubravka Đedović Handanović (Serbian Cyrillic: Дубравка Ђедовић Хандановић; formerly Dubravka Nègre; born 6 November 1978) is a Serbian banker and politician serving as minister of mining and energy since 2022.

Born in Belgrade, she graduated from the Faculty of Economics at the University of Belgrade, and earned her master's degree from the Bocconi University and UCLA Anderson School of Management. Initially working for CNN International, she later worked as a financer before being appointed manager of operations at the European Investment Bank (EIB) in 2004. She worked at EIB until 2012, only to return as the director of the Regional Representative Office for Western Balkans in 2016. She left EIB in 2021, after which she served as a member of the executive board of NLB Komercijalna banka from December 2021 to October 2022.

== Early life ==
Dubravka Đedović was born on 6 November 1978 in Belgrade, Socialist Republic of Serbia, Socialist Federal Republic of Yugoslavia. She finished her primary education at a school at Braće Jerković, in Belgrade. She graduated in banking and finance from the Faculty of Economics at the University of Belgrade. She received her master's degree from the Bocconi University and UCLA Anderson School of Management. Đedović has published several scientific papers regarding public-private partnerships and is a lecturer at the University College London.

== Career ==
She began her career as a television producer for CNN International. During her work at the CNN International, where she covered the War in Afghanistan in 2001, she earned an award from the National Academy of Television Arts and Sciences. Đedović later worked as a financer. She was appointed manager of operations of the European Investment Bank in 2004. As the manager, she contracted projects in fields of education, energy, and telecommunications. She resided in Luxembourg and worked there until 2012. Đedović received two awards, the Project Finance Deal and EMEA Finance Magazine European Deal, due to her work on partnership projects in 2013.

She worked as the director of the Regional Representative Office of the European Investment Bank (EIB) for the Western Balkans from 2016 to 2021. As the director, she supported government of Serbia's economics reforms, while the EIB invested mostly in small and medium enterprises and the transportation sector in Serbia. In December 2021, she became a member of the executive board of NLB Komercijalna banka. She resigned from that position in October 2022, a day after becoming a minister in the government of Serbia.

== Minister of Mining and Energy ==
Initially, it was speculated that Đedović would be appointed minister for public investments, but on 23 October 2022 it was announced that she would instead serve as the minister of mining and energy in the third cabinet of Ana Brnabić. She was sworn in on 26 October, succeeding Zorana Mihajlović. Vreme, a weekly news magazine, stated that "she would symbolize the pro-Western orientation at least of her department". Đedović is supportive of accession of Serbia to the European Union.

During her first week in office, Đedović announced that the government should consider reforming the energy sector. In early November 2022, Đedović announced the increase of price of electricity and stated that "lithium mining should be considered"; a few days later, she stated that "Serbia will be an important source of rare minerals in the world".

== Personal life ==
According to Đedović, her parents were engineers; her father was an entrepreneur in Yugoslavia, while her mother worked at a Slovak company. She was married to Christophe Nègre, a French-Luxembourgish entrepreneur, until 2020, and has four children in total; two of them were adopted. She speaks English, French, Italian, and Russian. Đedović describes herself as yugo-nostalgic. Her second marriage is with Serbian composer Damir Handanović on 2023 with whom she is expecting a child.
