= Buba Corelli =

Bosnian rapper, songwriter and producer (born 1989)

- Born: Amar Hodžić; 22 September 1989 (age 37); Sarajevo, SR Bosnia and Herzegovina, SFR Yugoslavia
- Occupations: Musician; rapper; songwriter; producer; entrepreneur
- Years active: 2011–present
- Label: Imperia

Amar Hodžić (born 22 September 1989), known by his stage name Buba Corelli, is a Bosnian rapper, songwriter, and record producer. He is best known for his collaborative efforts with Jala Brat, with whom he founded the record label Imperia.

Apart from his own musical career, Corelli has also attained significant success as a producer working for well known regional artists such as Maya Berović, Milan Stanković, and Severina.

== Life and career ==
=== 1989–2014: Early life and career beginnings ===
Amar Hodžić was born on 22 September 1989 in Sarajevo, SR Bosnia and Herzegovina, SFR Yugoslavia. According to him, he initially showed interest for music as a teenager and released his first song in 2004 alongside his childhood friend as the Corelli duo.

Corelli was introduced to Jala Brat, with whom he started collaborating on their EP titled Sin City, released in March 2013. Their collaborative studio album Pakt s Đavolom (lit. 'Deal with the Devil') was released in December the following year.

=== 2015–present: Mainstream success and legal issues ===
In June 2015, Corelli was arrested on suspicion of drug issues and sentenced to prison until May 2016. However, in December, previously-recorded single – "Habibi" by Serbian singer Rasta – was released featuring Corelli. The song went viral, counting more than forty million views on YouTube, leading to Corelli's first mainstream success. In June 2016, he was hit on the back of the head with a glass bottle while performing in a Doboj night-club.

In April 2018, Corelli and Jala Brat released a promotional single titled "Mafia". Corelli released his solo single "Balenciaga" in May and another collaborative single titled "Ona'e" (lit. 'She's') in June, the latter with Serbian artist Coby. These songs were parts of the campaign for their first concert in Belgrade on 23 June at Tašmajdan stadium in front of 15,000 people.

In July 2018, Corelli and Rasta colleborated with Maya Berović, this time for her 7 album. In December, they released a single titled "Benga po snijegu" (lit. 'Beemer in the Snow'), featuring Rasta. The duo released three more singles: "Mila" (lit. 'Dear'), "Bebi" (lit. 'Baby') and "Kamikaza" (lit. 'Kamikaze'), latter featuring Slovenian singer Senidah in January, April, and August respectively. They also performed at Skenderija in Sarajevo on 9 August and in the Belgrade Arena with Serbian pop-folk singer Aca Lukas on the New Year's Eve. Corelli was also featured in two tracks from Jala Brat's album 99 in September. However, the same month, he was sentenced to one year in prison for illegal drug production and trafficking.

== Discography ==
=== Studio albums ===
- Zulum (2014)
- Pakt s Đavolom (feat. Jala Brat; 2014)
- Stari Radio (feat. Jala Brat; 2016)
- Kruna (feat. Jala Brat; 2016)
- Alfa & Omega (feat. Jala Brat; 2019)
- GoodFellas (feat. Jala Brat; 2023)
- Goat Season, Vol. 1 (feat. Jala Brat; 2024)
- Goat Season, Vol. 2 (feat. Jala Brat; 2024)
- Goat Season: Final Chapter (feat. Jala Brat; 2024)
- Roze suze (feat. Jala Brat; 2025)
- Godzilla (feat. Jala Brat; 2026)

=== Extended plays ===
- Sin City (feat. Jala Brat; 2013)

== Awards and nominations ==
Music Awards Ceremony

Year	Nominee / work	Award	Result	Ref.
2019	'Ego' Milan Stanković ft. Jala Brat & Buba Corelli	Collaboration of the Year	Nominated	
2019	'Pravo vreme' Maya Berović ft. Buba Corelli	Collaboration of the Year	Nominated	
2019	'Balenciaga'	Modern Dance Song of the Year	Nominated	
