= Turbo-folk =

Music genre from Serbia

- Stylistic origins: Serbian folk music; pop music; Eurodance; techno
- Cultural origins: 1980s SFR Yugoslavia
- Typical instruments: Accordion; brass instruments; synthesizer

Fusion genres
- Pop-folk

Other topics
- Chalga; laïkó; manele; tallava

Turbo-folk (Serbian Cyrillic: турбо-фолк) is a subgenre of contemporary South Slavic pop music that initially developed in Serbia during the 1990s as a fusion of techno and folk. The term "turbo-folk" was coined by Montenegrin singer Rambo Amadeus, who jokingly used it to describe an aggressive, satirical style of music. While he coined the term, according to Rambo Amadeus, the origin of the turbo-folk sound came with the 1984 album Der Osten ist Rot. While primarily associated with Serbia, this genre is also popular in other former Yugoslav nations, particularly Croatia and Bosnia and Herzegovina.

== Croatia ==
Turbo-folk grew in Croatia in part due to the popularity of the Croatian singer Severina's style of fusion music. Turbo-folk is purportedly seen as a "part of everyday life in Croatia and serves a means of social release and reaction to the effects of globalisation in Croatia" according to contemporary art professor Urosh Cvoro of UNSW Sydney.

Upon introduction of Billboard Croatia Songs chart on 15 February 2022, it became apparent that mainstream music from Serbia and other former Yugoslav republics (which is all described as turbo-folk or by a derogatory term "cajka" (plural: cajke) by its critics in Croatia) dominated the music taste of the people of Croatia, as the only Croatian artists featured on the chart were Eni Jurišić, Matija Cvek, 30zona, Kuku$ Klan, Jelena Rozga and Grše, and the only Western artists featured on the chart were Glass Animals and Red Hot Chili Peppers.

== Central Europe ==
Turbo-folk can be heard in Balkan clubs and Ex-Yu-style discos in parts of Switzerland that speak German. Reports of turbo-folk from 2023 describe the music used for diasporic youth in these areas to "socialise and live out the culture of their country of origin" according to Dr Müller-Suleymanova of ZHAW.

== Criticism ==
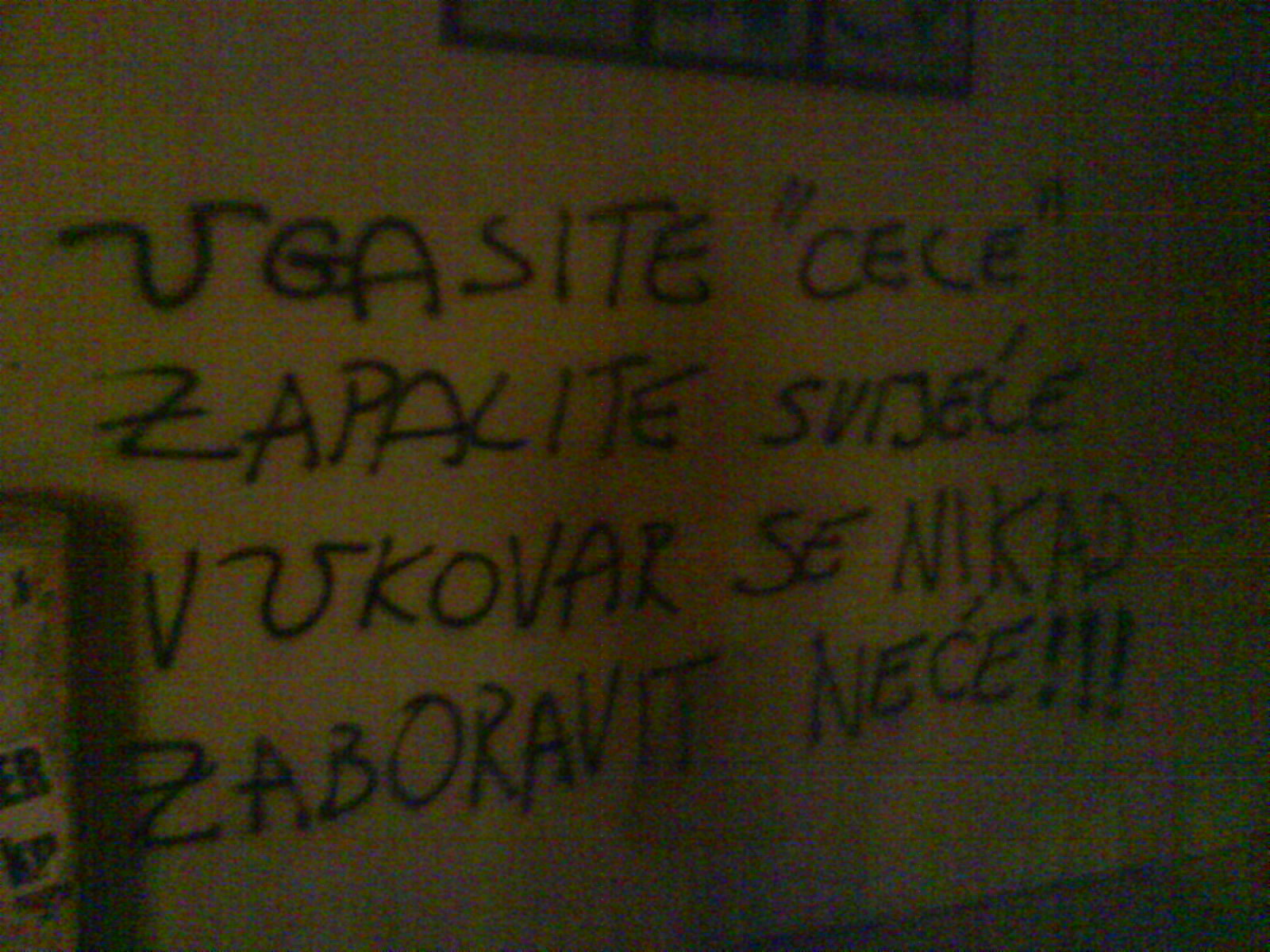
Graffiti against Ceca's music in Imotski, Croatia: "Turn off the 'Cecas'/Light up the candles/Vukovar will never/Be forgotten" (written with stylized U's symbolizing the Croatian nationalist and fascist organisation Ustaše)

Critics of turbo-folk alleged that it was a promotional instrument of Serbia's political ideology during Milošević rule. This liberal section of Serbian and Croatian society explicitly viewed this music as vulgar, almost pornographic kitsch, glorifying crime, moral corruption and nationalist xenophobia. In addition to making a connection between turbofolk and "war profiteering, crime & weapons cult, rule of force and violence", in her book Smrtonosni sjaj (Deadly Splendor) Belgrade media theorist Ivana Kronja refers to its look as "aggressive, sadistic and pornographically eroticised iconography". Along the same lines, British culture theorist Alexei Monroe calls the phenomenon "porno-nationalism". However, turbo-folk was equally popular amongst the South Slavic peoples during the Yugoslav Wars.

As long as I am the mayor, there will be no nightclub-singers of [cajke] or turbo-folk parades in a single municipal hall.

— Anto Đapić, former mayor of Osijek and leader of the Croatian Party of Rights

The resilience of a turbo-folk culture and musical genre, often referred to as the "soundtrack to Serbia’s wars", was and to a certain extent still is, actively promoted and exploited by pro-government commercial TV stations, most notably on Pink and Palma TV-channels, which devote significant amount of their broadcasting schedule to turbo-folk shows and music videos.

Others, however, feel that this neglects the specific social and political context that brought about turbo-folk, which was, they say, entirely different from the context of contemporary western popular culture. In their opinion, turbo-folk served as a dominant paradigm of the "militant nationalist" regime of Slobodan Milošević, "fully controlled by regime media managers". John Fiske feels that during that period, turbo-folk and its close counterpart, Serbian Eurodance, had the monopoly over the officially permitted popular culture, while, according to him, in contrast, Western mass media culture of the time provided a variety of music genre, youth styles, and consequently ideological positions.

== See also ==
- Music of Serbia
- Chalga
- Manele
- Arabesk music
- Disco polo
- Laïkó
- Tallava
- Rabiz
- Hardbass
- Dangdut
- Eurodance
