= Ceca discography =

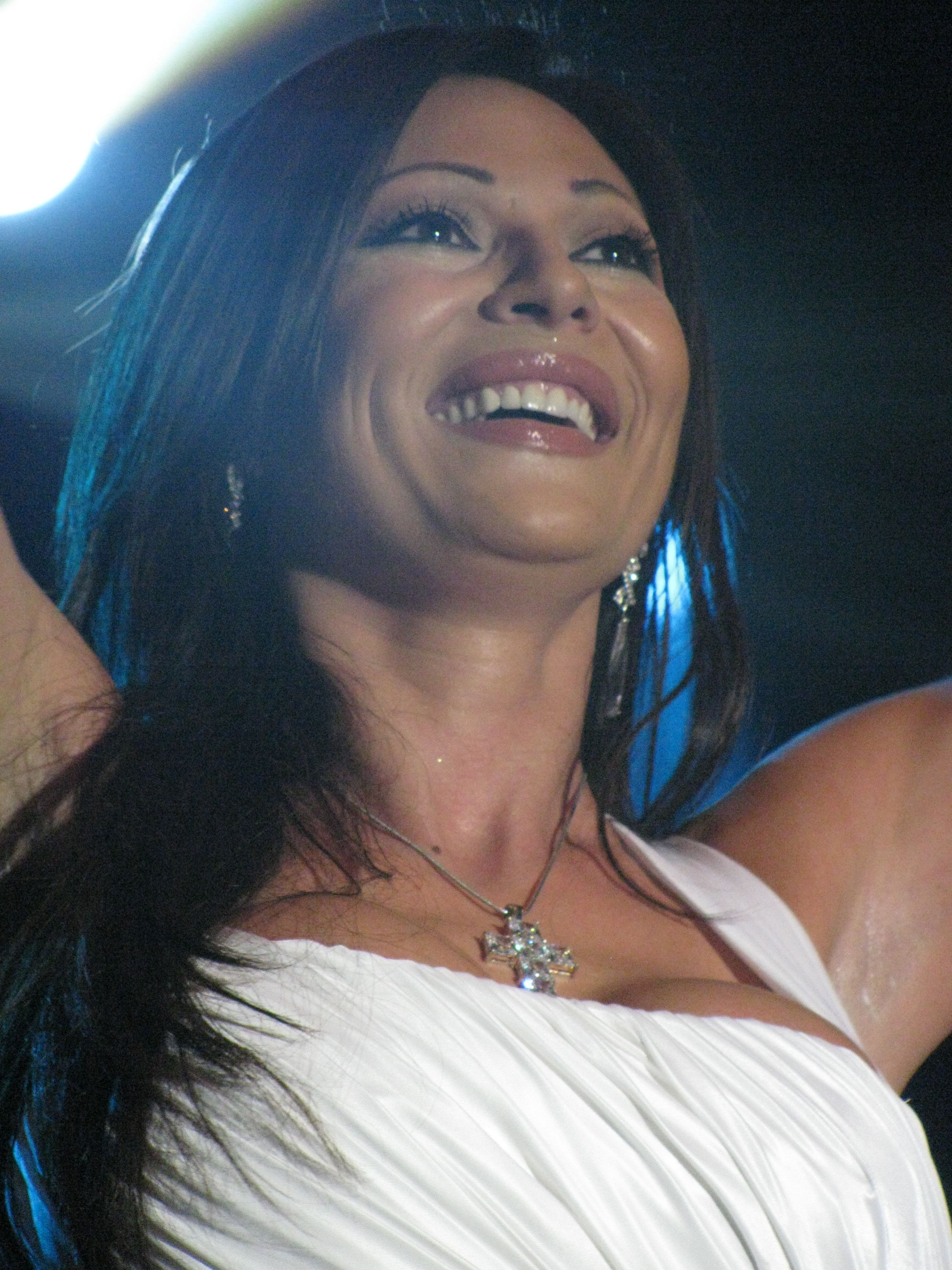
- Ceca in Ljubljana in 2009
- Studio albums: 18
- Compilation albums: 12
- Singles: 11
- Video albums: 7
- Music videos: 51
- Remix albums: 2

The discography of Serbian singer Ceca includes eighteen studio albums, two remix albums, seven video albums, twelve compilations, ten singles and fifty-one music videos.

== Albums ==
=== Studio albums ===
Title	Album details	Peak chart positions	Sales
Title	Album details	SLO	Sales
Cvetak zanovetak	Released: 1988; Label: PGP-RTB; Formats: LP, cassette	—	350,000
Ludo srce	Released: 1989; Label: PGP-RTB; Formats: LP, cassette	—	200,000
Pustite me da ga vidim (also known as To, Miki and Ceca)	Released: 1990; Label: PGP-RTB; Formats: LP, cassette	—	360,000
Babaroga	Released: 1991; Label: PGP-RTB; Formats: LP, CD, cassette	—	328,000
Šta je to u tvojim venama (also known as Kukavica)	Released: 1993; Label: Južni Vetar; Formats: CD, cassette	—	300,000
Ja još spavam u tvojoj majici	Released: 1994; Label: Lucky Sound; Formats: CD, cassette	—	
Fatalna ljubav	Released: 1995; Label: PGP-RTS, Lucky Sound; Formats: CD, cassette	—	450,000
Emotivna luda	Released: 1996; Label: Komuna; Formats: CD, cassette	—	210,000
Maskarada	Released: 1997; Label: PGP-RTS; Formats: CD, cassette	—	124,000
Ceca 2000	Released: 29 December 1999; Label: PGP-RTS; Formats: CD, cassette	—	200,000
Decenija	Released: 15 October 2001; Label: Grand Production, City Records; Formats: CD, cassette	—	800,000
Gore od ljubavi	Released: 24 May 2004; Label: Ceca Music, Miligram Music; Formats: CD, cassette	—	
Idealno loša	Released: 17 June 2006; Label: Ceca Music, Miligram Music; Formats: CD, cassette	—	
Ljubav živi	Released: 17 June 2011; Label: Miligram Music; Formats: CD, digital	5	145,000
Poziv	Released: 17 June 2013; Label: Miligram Music, City Records; Formats: CD, digital	1	200,000
Autogram	Released: 25 June 2016; Label: Ceca Music; Formats: CD, digital	—	150,000
"—" denotes an album that did not chart or was not released in that territory.

=== Remix albums ===
Title	Album details	Sales
London Mix	Released: 7 June 2005; Label: Ceca Music, Miligram Music; Formats: CD	100,000
C — Club	Released: 25 June 2012; Label: Miligram Music; Formats: CD	80,000

=== Video albums ===
Title	Album details
Ceca	Released: 1990; Label: PGP-RTB; Formats: VHS
Babaroga	Released: 1991; Label: PGP-RTB; Formats: VHS
Kukavica	Released: 1993; Label: Zmex, Lucky Sound; Formats: VHS
Ceca & Futa band	Released: 1994; Label: Lucky Sound; Formats: VHS
Sve najbolje… 20	Released: 1995; Label: Bonami; Formats: VHS
Fatalna ljubav live	Released: 1995; Label: Delije; Formats: VHS
Ušće 2006	Released: 17 December 2006; Label: Ceca Music, Miligram Music; Formats: DVD

=== Compilation albums ===
Title	Album details
Pustite me da ga vidim	Released: 1990; Label: PGP-RTB; Formats: CD
Ceca hitovi	Released: 1994; Label: PGP-RTB; Formats: Cassette
Multi Megamix Hitovi	Released: 1996; Label: N-estrada; Formats: CD, cassette
Ceca No. 1	Released: 1999; Label: Tioli production, Biveco; Formats: CD
Hitovi 1	Released: 2000; Label: Hi-Fi Centar; Formats: CD, cassette
Hitovi 2	Released: 2000; Label: Hi-Fi Centar; Formats: CD, cassette
Hitovi 3	Released: 2003; Label: Hi-Fi Centar; Formats: CD, cassette
Balade	Released: 2003; Label: Hi-Fi Centar; Formats: CD, cassette
Hitovi	Released: 2005; Label: Hi-Fi Centar; Formats: CD
Hitovi 1	Released: 2007; Label: PGP-RTS; Formats: CD
Hitovi 2	Released: 2007; Label: PGP-RTS; Formats: CD
Hitovi 3	Released: 2007; Label: PGP-RTS; Formats: CD

== Singles ==
Year	Title	Peak chart positions	Album
Year	Title	CRO Billb.	Album
1988	"Cvetak zanovetak"	*	Cvetak zanovetak
1992	"Neću protiv druga svog" (featuring Rade Šerbedžija)	*	Neću protiv druga svog
1992	"U snu ljubim medna usta" (featuring Dragan Kojić Keba)	*	Hitovi — U produkciji Zorana Starčevića
1994	"Ko na grani jabuka" (featuring Željko Šašić)	*	Gori more
1994	"Bandido" (featuring Ivana Žigon)	*	Non-album single
2007	"Vreme za ljubav ističe" (featuring Oliver Mandić)	*	Vreme za ljubav ističe
2014	"Ne zanosim se ja" (featuring Aca Lukas)	*	Non-album singles
2017	"Lažov notorni" (featuring Saša Matić)	*	Non-album singles
2024	"Ne računaj na mene" (featuring Maya Berović)	6	Non-album singles
2024	"Za kraj"	—	Non-album singles
2024	"Više od sreće" (featuring Željko Joksimović)	—	Non-album singles
2024	"Muškarčina" (featuring Voyage)	6	Guns N Roses
"—" denotes a recording that did not chart. "*" denotes a recording released before the chart's launch.

== Music videos ==
Year	Title	Director
1988	"Cvetak zanovetak"	Unknown
1989	"Zabraniću srcu da te voli"	Unknown
1990	"To, Miki"	Unknown
1990	"Pustite me da ga vidim"	Unknown
1990	"Cipelice"	Unknown
1990	"Lako je tebi"	Unknown
1990	"Sve u svoje vreme"	Unknown
1990	"Ne daj me"	Unknown
1990	"Eh, teško meni"	Unknown
1991	"Babaroga"	Unknown
1991	"Volim te"	Unknown
1991	"Izbriši, vetre, trag"	Unknown
1991	"Hej, vršnjaci"	Unknown
1991	"Sto put’ sam se zaklela"	Unknown
1991	"Da si nekad do bola voleo"	Unknown
1991	"Ne kuni, majko"	Unknown
1991	"Bivši"	Unknown
1991	"Mokra trava"	Unknown
1993	"Kukavica"	Unknown
1993	"Šta je to u tvojim venama"	Unknown
1993	"Oprosti mi suze"	Unknown
1993	"Žarila sam žar"	Unknown
1993	"Zaboravi"	Unknown
1994	"Ne računaj na mene"	Unknown
1994	"Neću da budem k’o mašina"	Unknown
1994	"Ko nekad u osam"	Unknown
1994	"Ko na grani jabuka"	Unknown
1995	"Nije monotonija"	Dejan Milićević
1995	"Znam"	Dejan Milićević
1995	"Idi dok si mlad"	Dejan Milićević
1995	"Fatalna ljubav"	Dejan Milićević
1995	"Beograd"	Dejan Milićević
1996	"Neodoljiv-neumoljiv"	Dejan Milićević
1997	"Nevaljala"	Dejan Milićević
1999	"Dokaz"	Dejan Milićević
2000	"Crveno"	Dejan Milićević
2001	"Zabranjeni grad"	Unknown
2002	"Bruka"	Igor Kusić
2002	"Dragane moj"	Unknown
2002	"39,2"	Unknown
2004	"Gore od ljubavi"	Unknown
2005	"Trula višnja"	Unknown
2006	"Lepi grome moj"	Unknown
2011	"Rasulo"	Miloš Nadaždin
2013	"Da raskinem sa njom"	Miloš Nadaždin
2013	"Turbulentno"	Miloš Nadaždin
2015	"Dobro sam prošla"	Miloš Nadaždin
2017	"Nevinost"	Unknown
2017	"Anđeo drugog reda"	Unknown
2017	"Lažov notorni"	Dejan Milićević
2024	"Više od sreće" (featuring Željko Joksimović)	Miloš Nadaždin
