= Ušće, Belgrade =

Ušće Ушће
- Urban neighbourhood
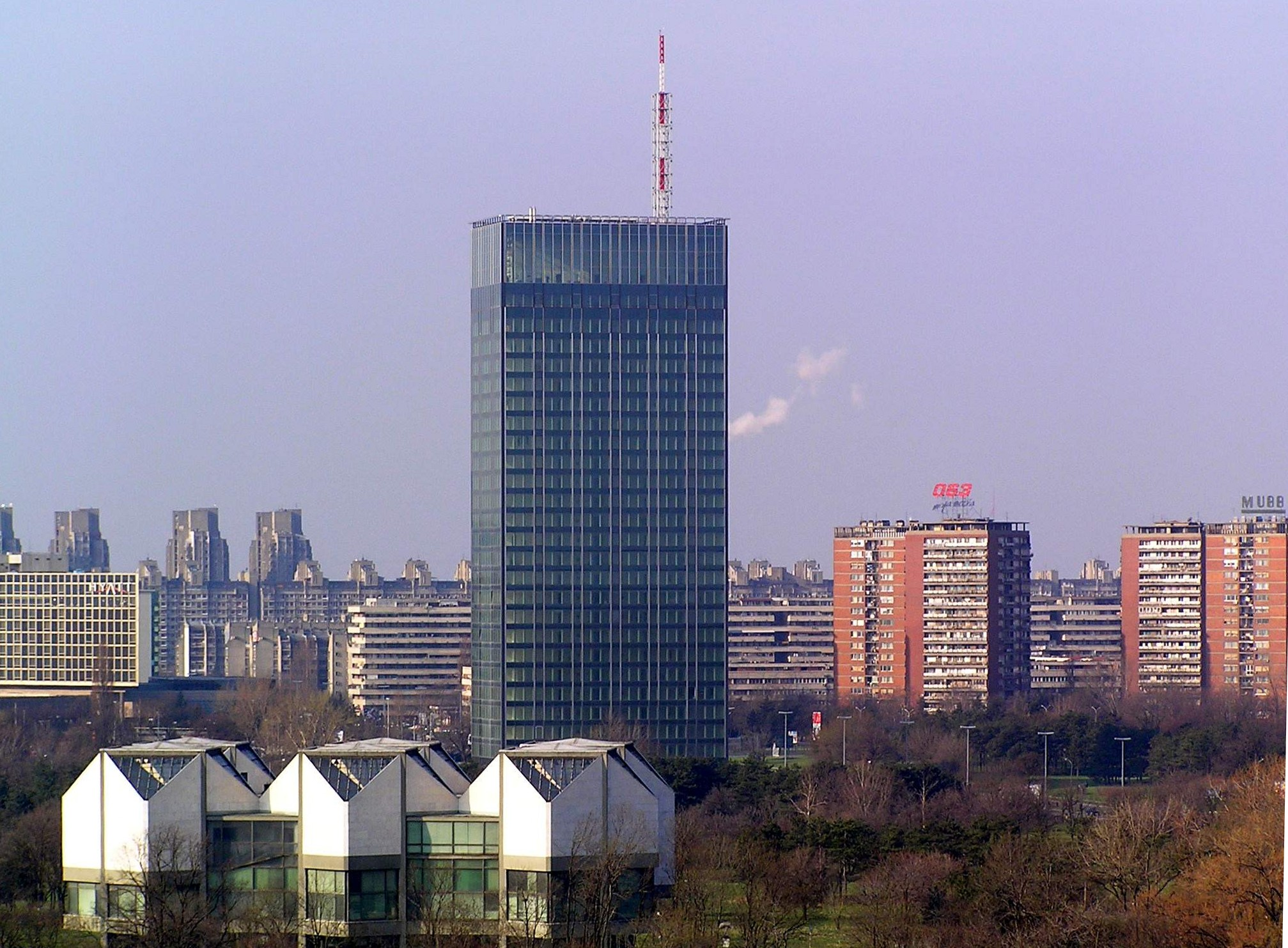
- Ušće Tower
- Interactive map of Ušće
- Location within Belgrade
- Coordinates: 44°49′09″N 20°26′13″E
- Country: Serbia
- Region: Belgrade
- Municipality: New Belgrade

Area
  - Total: 1.69 km^{2} (0.65 sq mi)

Population (2011)
  - Total: 9,991
  - Density: 5,910/km^{2} (15,300/sq mi)
- Time zone: UTC+1 (CET)
  - Summer (DST): UTC+2 (CEST)
- Area code: +381(0)11
- Car plates: BG

Ušće (Serbian Cyrillic: Ушће; pronounced [ûːʃt͡ɕe]) is an urban neighborhood of Belgrade, the capital of Serbia. It is located in Belgrade's municipality of Novi Beograd. Ušće is located on the mouth of the Sava river into the Danube, thus the name (ušće is Serbian for confluence). It occupies Novi Beograd's Blocks 10, 13, 14, 15 and 16 on the Sava's left and the Danube's right bank, covering a tip of land that overlooks the islands of Little War Island and Great War Island to the north and the old core of Belgrade, the fortress of Kalemegdan to the west. Ušće borders the neighborhoods of Staro Sajmište and Savograd on the south. As a compact grassy and forested area it stretches along the bank of the Danube into the Block 10, to the Zemun municipality and the Hotel Jugoslavija and the ENJUB shopping mall.

Spanning over 0.52 square kilometres (0.20 sq mi), Park Ušće is the largest official park area in Belgrade.

== History ==
=== Nica Beach ===
Historical population
| Year | Pop. | ±% |
|---|---|---|
| 1981 | 8,032 | — |
| 1991 | 8,056 | +0.3% |
| 2002 | 6,623 | −17.8% |
| 2011 | 9,991 | +50.9% |

A sandy beach with the cabins, kafanas and barracks, used as sheds by the fishermen, occupied the area of the modern quay, north of the Branko's Bridge. It was one of the favorite vacation spots of Belgraders during Interbellum. People were transported from the city by small boats and the starting point was a small kafana "Malo pristanište" in Savamala. Occupying the left bank of the Sava, it was on the location of the access ramp for the future King Alexander Bridge. The objects were demolished manually, including numerous kafanas: "Ostend", "Zdravlje", "Abadžija", "Jadran", "Krf", "Dubrovnik", "Adrija", etc. The only one that wasn't demolished was "Nica", predecessor of the modern Ušće restaurant. In total, 20 proper objects and 2,000 cabins, barracks, sheds, etc. were demolished, jointly by the municipalities of Zemun and Bežanija, which owned half of the land each, and the proprietors of the objects. The plan was to build an embankment instead.

However, the beach itself survived the construction of the bridge in 1934 as it only made access easier. By this time, "Nica" became the largest city beach. It was filled with fine, white sands and was shallow. In time it stretched even further along the Sava, up to the location of the modern Gazela Bridge. There was a sandy barrier island (sprud) close to the central section of the Sava in front of the beach so it was a popular goal to be reached by the swimmers. The beach was finally closed in 1938 when the construction of the embankment began. The barrier island was destroyed after 1948, when the sand was used to fill the marsh during the construction of New Belgrade. The beach itself was called Nica (Serbian for Nice, in France) after one of the kafanas.

== Characteristics ==
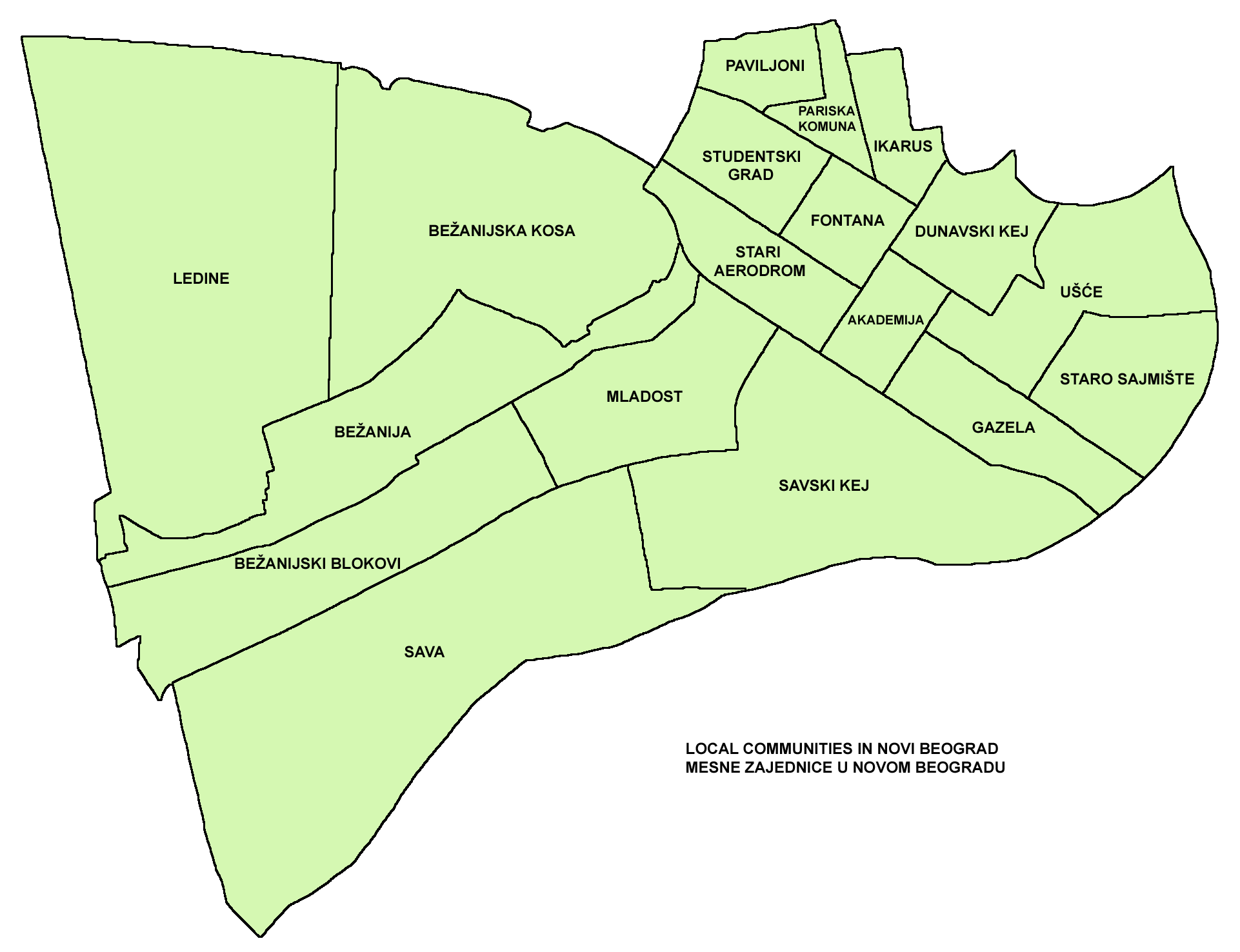
Map of Local communities in Novi Beograd

Like all of Novi Beograd, Ušće is flat, and without buildings to hide that fact like in the rest of the municipality, that is quite obvious here. With only three buildings and several smaller edifices, Ušće is the least urbanized section of Novi Beograd but some residential blocks are administratively attached to the local community of the same name, which had a population of 9,991 in 2011.

Ušće is a vast grassy and forested area 2.5 km × 1 km (1.55 mi × 0.62 mi) along the river banks. As such, it is used by many Belgraders as a recreational area or as a place for organizing political gatherings or musical concerts. However, many areas are not cultivated, but left to grow wild. During the high levels of the Danube and the Sava, bank areas are always flooded.

As maintained open parkland with high levels of human activity, Ušće is characterized by low diversity of breeding landbirds, but in winter the banks are very popular among birdwatchers as it is possible to observe rare and interesting waterbirds swimming at the confluence off the banks of Great and Little War Island. Ušće is one of the most important eBird hotspots in Belgrade with its own webpage: Ebird Hotspot

In September 2018, Belgrade's mayor Zoran Radojičić announced that the construction of a dam on the Danube, in the Zemun-New Belgrade area, will start soon. The dam should protect the city during the high water levels. Such project was never mentioned before, nor it was clear how and where it will be constructed, or if it's feasible at all. Radojičić clarified after a while that he was referring to the temporary, mobile flood wall. The wall will be 50 cm (20 in) high and 5 km (3.1 mi) long, stretching from the Branko's Bridge across the Sava and the neighborhood of Ušće, to the Radecki restaurant on the Danube's bank in the Zemun's Gardoš neighborhood. In the case of emergency, the panels will be placed on the existing construction. The construction is scheduled to start in 2019 and to finish in 2020.

== Park Ušće ==
Much of Ušće already is, or is projected to be, a large park. On 24 August 2017, the mayor of Belgrade, Siniša Mali, announced a massive works in the park which would, as he described it, look like a Central Park in New York City or a Gorky Park in Moscow. The entire project, which would arrange the area of 88 ha (220 acres) between the Branko's Bridge and Hotel Jugoslavija, is based on the ideas of Jan Gehl. The entire project is to be finished by 2020. Park will be divided in 7 zones. Two zones closer to Zemun and Zemunski Kej will be "Movement" 1,280 m^{2} (13,800 sq ft) and "Nature" 763 m^{2} (8,210 sq ft).

They will be mostly nature and sports oriented with various sports terrains and children playgrounds. Next zone "Serbia" ("Serbia 1" 370 m^{2} (4,000 sq ft) and "Serbia 2" 824 m^{2} (8,870 sq ft)), will be adapted for the promotion of Serbian culture, folklore, gastronomy, etc. The next two zones are "Music" and "Water", while the two closest to the Branko's Bridge, surrounding the Museum of Contemporary Arts, are "Art" and "Science". They will cover 2,800 m^{2} (30,000 sq ft) and some works in it started immediately. For 2018, Mali announced the construction of the gondola lift, which will connect the geographical tip of Ušće with Kalemegdan, and of a giant Ferris wheel across the Great War Island. He confirmed the erection of a tall flagmast.

The flagmast was already brought up before. Without any previous public mention of the project, Mali announced on 26 June 2017 construction of the 120-metre-high (394 ft) flagmast in Ušće, which would hold the Serbian flag, 20 m (66 ft) by 30 m (98 ft). He already declared it a symbol of Belgrade which would bring many tourists who will take photos with the mast, which is "important for the entire Serbia" and will make Belgrade a modern and more beautiful city. He also added that the project is an "initiative of president Aleksandar Vučić".

Mayor Siniša Mali claimed the money for the project, 200 million dinars, has already been marked in the city budget, due to the previous "savings". Asked how is that a priority when one third of Belgrade still has no sewage system, Mali said that both the sewage and the mast are needed. Dragoljub Bakić, member of the Serbian Academy of Architecture, said that the city government treats Belgrade as the "prey" they won, labeling their politics as an "urban reality show as they bomb us every day with some other nonsense". Bakić also criticized the parceling and concreting of the park area.

Rodoljub Šabić, state Commissioner for the information of public importance, publicly criticized the project on Twitter and was slammed by the author of the idea, president Vučić on the press conference who said that Šabić is "against the Serbian flag" and that "those who never do anything, criticize all the time". Šabić replied that Vučić always subjectively and without any criteria defends people from his close circle and that being against the pole which would cost 1,65 million euros is not the same thing as being against the Serbian flag. He added that it would be better to buy something meaningful, like the MRI for some hospital.

Mali announced the expansion of the project. Apart from the one tall, whose price in few days grew to 230 million dinars (1.9 million euros), 30 additional flagmasts, each 30 m (98 ft) high, are planned. Three of them will be placed on ten entry points into the city. They will cost additional 134 million dinars (1.1 million euros), so 31 flagmasts will cost the city almost 3 million euros. Reminded that for that money a kindegraten or a school could have been built, Mali said "don't your worry about it" and that we are "rich enough country and rich enough city", repeating Vučić's claim that those who are against the project actually don't like the Serbian flag. Three days later, Mali changed his statement and said that the idea is not Vučić's but is actually a joint decision of the city and the state.

Construction of the gondola lift was confirmed in March 2018 when the idea of a pedestrian bridge was dropped after it has been described as "complicated" and "unstable". On the Kalemegdan side, the station will be dug into the hill, 1 m (3 ft 3 in) below the fortress' Sava Promenade. On the Ušćе side, the starting point will be next to the Skate Park, across the Ušće Tower. The entire route is 1 km (0.62 mi) long, of which 300 m (980 ft) will be above the Sava river itself. Estimated cost is €10 million and duration of works 18 months, but it is still not known when the construction will begin. The criticism of the project continued, from the officially used name (gondola instead of a traditional Serbian žičara) and chosen location, to the route, especially the Kalemegdan station. Several reports were filed against the people involved in the project, but the state didn't act upon any of them. The project is opposed to the laws and city's decisions on protection as it will have up to 45 m (148 ft) high pillars which would obstruct the protected view from the Belgrade bridges towards the fortress and from the fortress to New Belgrade. Also, the Kalemegdan station is to be dug into the walls of the fortress, which is protected by the law as the Cultural Heritage of Exceptional Importance.

Even larger works were announced in December 2018. The area for the reconstruction was enlarged to 91 ha (220 acres), including parts of both existing Ušće and Friendship parks. The height of the envisioned Ferris wheel was set to 85 m (279 ft) and construction of a new building, the 21st Century Arts Museum was planned. The new museum will have 25,000 m^{2} (270,000 sq ft) of exhibition space, four times more than the existing Contemporary Arts Museum, though it shouldn't be taller (20 m (66 ft)). Further additions to the project are the Museum of Natural Sciences (floor area 15,000 m^{2} (160,000 sq ft), height 20 m (66 ft)) and an aquarium with the area of 5,000 m^{2} (54,000 sq ft). The international architectural design competition for the entire project was scheduled for 2019, but was organized only in November 2023. In March 2023 president Vučić reiterated that the Museum of Natural Sciences will be built close to the existing Museum of Contemporary Art, and with other planned museums will form a Museum Quarter.

Cutting of over 100 trees in the park, because of the gondola lift began in March 2019. With an enlarged price of €15 million and unified opposition to the project by the environmentalists, architects and urbanists, with additional cutting of 40 trees across the river, on the Fortress, this prompted popular protests. Citizens organized and as city was cutting the trees, they were planting the new seedlings instead.

City administration declared the reconstruction finished in March 2019, though nothing of the planned attractions was built. It was also announced that the Ferris wheel project was scrapped while the construction of the flagmast was pushed to the end of the year. In May 2019 the idea of the Ferris wheel was revived, with the possible addition of an alpine coaster and a roller coaster. In February 2021 it was announced that city planned the construction of the flagmast in 2021, with the price lifted to 269,2 million dinars (€2.3 million). Though nothing has been done regarding the flagmast, a certain amount of money was spent from the city budget every year on it, including the projected 2022 budget.

A monument to Rabindranath Tagore was dedicated on 13 July 2021, close to the Branko's Bridge. The verses of Tagore's poem Where the mind is without fear are carved on the pedestal. The memorial also marked 95 years since Tagore's visit to Belgrade in 1926, when he was a visiting scholar at the University of Belgrade.

In the section between the Palace of Serbia and the Danube, a medieval knights themed park was opened in 2018, named Belgrade's Knights Park Svibor. It hosts an annual knights festival called "Despot's Days".

=== Friendship Park ===
Friendship Park (Serbian: Парк пријатељства, romanized: Park prijateljstva) is a section of the park bounded by the Nikola Tesla Boulevard on the south and the esplanade along the Danube on the north. It covers an area of 127 ha (310 acres) and is specific for the fact that most of the trees are planted by the politicians, artists and celebrities. It was founded in 1961, during the 1st Summit of the Non-Aligned Movement in Belgrade. The first seedling was planted by the Serbian politician Voja Leković but followed by Josip Broz Tito and Jawaharlal Nehru.

In the next decades they were followed by over 180 people, including Gamal Abdel Nasser, Haile Selassie, Sirimavo Bandaranaike, Archbishop Makarios III, Elizabeth II, Mikhail Gorbachev and Ion Iliescu, who planted the last "celebrity" tree in 1993 and the park deteriorated due to the lack of maintenance. It was renovated in the mid-2000s and in 2007 the initiative was started to restore the tradition of planting the trees. In 2007 each tree got a memorial plaque with the names of the persons who planted it and the new seedlings were planted by the members of the EYOF and the members of the Rolling stones. Projects for the park caused controversies since the early 2000s.

On the one-year anniversary of the end of the NATO bombing of Yugoslavia in 2000, the monument Eternal Flame was built as a pet project of Mirjana Marković, the wife of Slobodan Milošević and later the stir was caused by the proposal for construction the building of the Belgrade Opera in the park. Idea was later dropped. As of 2018, the Eternal Flame monument still has no necessary permits and is technically illegally built.

An area of 14 ha (35 acres) within the park, the Peace Alley, has been declared an "important place". The park was fully renovated from September 2018 to March 2019.

== Features ==
=== Buildings ===
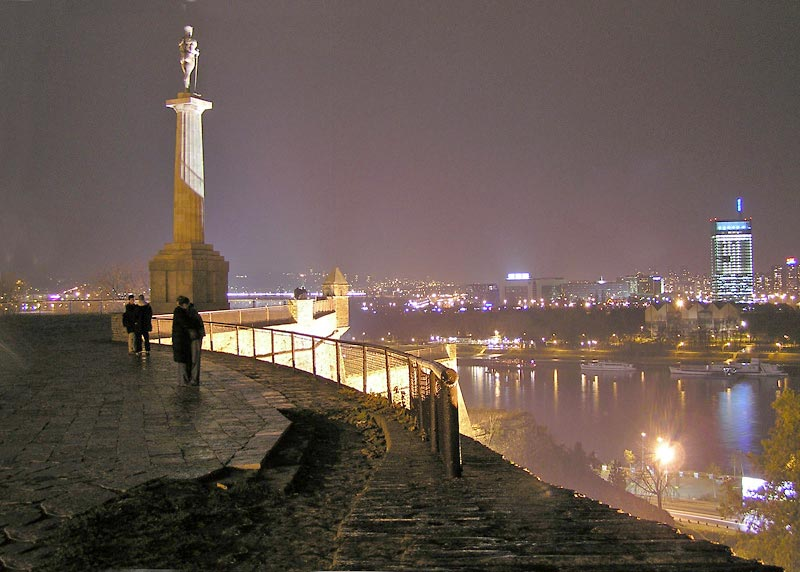
Skyline of the Sava's bank of Ušće by night (with the Ušće Tower), seen from the Kalemegdan fortress

Ušće has only three buildings, but two of them are monumental. One is the Palace of Serbia, formerly Palace of the Federation (Serbian: Палата Федерације, Palata Federacije), a seat of the former federal governments of Yugoslavia and Serbia and Montenegro (also called the SIV building). Another monumental building is the Ušće Tower, with 134 m(antenna) of height almost tallest building in the Balkans (it was second tallest before the NATO attack on Serbia in 1999 when Avala TV Tower just outside Belgrade was razed). Third important building is the Museum of Contemporary Art, close to Sava river's left bank.

In January 2018, it was announced that the construction of a twin building to the Ušće Tower, a 103.9-metre-tall (341 ft) Tower II, will start in February. The foundation stone was laid on 27 February 2018. The building is 22-stories high and the entire project cost €65 million. It was officially opened on 11 June 2020.

The modernist sculpture dedicated to the "Women's courage" was placed on the plateau in front of the Ušće Tower on 4 December 2019. The sculpture is work of Marko Lađušić.

=== Restaurants ===
Other facilities in the neighborhood are several restaurants along the river banks. Oldest and the best known is the restaurant "Ušće". It was built in 1960 by Stojan Maksimović and entered Serbian textbooks of architecture as the first public facility of the contemporary architecture in Belgrade. The interior design was work of Mario Maskareli. Due to its location, near the confluence and close to the river with the view on Kalemegdan, Cathedral Church and the old section of Belgrade across the Sava river, the restaurant was featured in numerous movies, music videos and broadcasts and until 1990s was one of the most distinguished restaurants in town. The restaurant was refurbished and ceremonially reopened on 1 June 2017 under the name of "Nacionalna Klasa". Only five days later, on 6 June, the restaurant was partially burned in the fire.

Sava's left bank contains numerous barges (Serbian: сплав, splav), which since the early 1990s became center of the famed Belgrade's night life. When the complete reworking of the park was announced in 2018, it was said that all barges between the Branko's Bridge (Sava river) and the Military Complex (arm of the Danube across the Great War Island) will have to be moved. That would basically leave the entire neighborhood without restaurant barges. First barge was placed in 1991. "Lukas", though opened in 1985 on another location, by the mid-1990s became extremely popular and a gathering place for the members of two criminal clans, Voždovac and Zvezdara. Numerous shootouts, which included the river police and fatalities, ensued. Today, the splav with different name is on its former location. One of the first to play turbo-folk music, "Lukas" has been described as the "monument to the 1990s". By 1992, almost a dozen of new barges appeared "overnight", including a very popular "Mozzart", which sank after 2000. This entire section of Ušće is today recognized as a symbol of the "splavovi-culture".

In November 2023, city announced that all barges from the Branko's Bridge along the Ušće's entire Sava bank will be removed, freeing the quay. Barges along the Danube bank will remain.

=== Quay ===
The embankment along the rivers has been turned into the long promenade, which connects the promenade in Staro Sajmište (on the south, along Sava) and Zemunski Kej (on the north, Danube). The section of the Ušće promenade between the Branko's Bridge and the Hotel Jugoslavija has been renamed to the "Quay of the king Alexander I Karađorđević" on 29 June 2017.

The first planned bicycle path in Belgrade was built from Hotel Jugoslavija to Ušće. Designed by Mirko Radovanac, it was finished in 1979.

=== Motorsport circuit ===
Ušće was also the site of temporary street circuit where races were held since 1967. and were held almost every year afterwards. The track (in a 2.310 meter configuration) encompasses roads around the blok 15 (Ušće park), passing near the Ušće Tower, along the Branko's Bridge and then along the Sava bank, with its start-finish straight just across the eternal fire monument. The circuit is popularly known as "a circuit without right hand turn", although it has two slight right-handers, and it is famous for its high speed S-curve near restaurant "Ušće" and Museum of Contemporary Art, on Sava coast, which exist because the road had to navigate around the previously made Ranney collector. The first race was held on 30 April 1967. but the most remembered is the one held in 1969. (on a 4.350 configuration) when around 40.000 spectators flocked to see powerful Fiat Abarths in European Touring Car Challenge, and Formula Vee cars race on the streets. Young Niki Lauda participated in some of these races.

After poor management and maintenance of roads and circuit, and race cars reaching high speeds in 1990s and 2000s, FIA and drivers continuously criticised the safety of the track, lack of proper barriers and run-off areas. After many unfortunate events, and a fatality in 2005, the circuit was taken off the calendar and "Grand Prix of Belgrade" was subsequently replaced with a race held in Batajnica Air Base. Despite these events, the race on Ušće was held in 2008. The rich history of races held on Ušće have gained somewhat a "classic" status in Serbia and former Yugoslavia, with meany people's associations on hearing the word "Ušće" firstly reminding them about the race. Racing returned to the street circuit in 2016 and was added to the FIA Central European Zone Circuit Championship in 2017.

In September 2019 it was announced that the Ministry of the Interior's open garage under the Branko's Bridge will be adapted into the Museum of automobiles and Museum of the Ministry of the Interior. The project also includes plans for the adjoining tracks in Ušće to be used for revue races organized by the new museum.

=== Skatepark ===
After 20 years of skateboarders' activism to get one, the first skatepark in this part of Europe was opened on 28 September 2008. It is located in the Block 15, across the Ušće Tower and covers an area of 2,200 m^{2} (24,000 sq ft), which made it the largest one in the region when opened. Originally, it had 15 elements but after the 2011 reconstruction, 6 new elements were added. Apart from the everyday use (entrance is free for everyone with skateboards, rollers and bicycles), local and international competitions are being held at the park.

In December 2018 it was announced that due to the construction of the aerial lift to Kalemegdan, the skatepark will be moved to another location, as the starting point of the route on this side of the river will be on the exact spot of the skatepark. Construction of the aerial lift caused various controversies and public protests, so in March 2019 city announced that the skate park will not only be preserved, as the route of the lift will be corrected, but that it is going to be expanded and modernized.

=== Belgrade Philharmonic ===
In 1961 an all-Yugoslav architectural design competition for the "Museum of the revolution of the nations and nationalities of Yugoslavia" was announced. It was to be built in Block 13, on the location between the modern Palace Serbia and Ušće Tower. Out of 29 design entries, the project of Vjenceslav Richter was chosen. Construction began only in 1978 and it was envisioned as a square with the alley, eternal flame and the monument to the President of Yugoslavia, Josip Broz Tito. The museum was planned to cover an area of 15,200 m^{2} (164,000 sq ft) but only the basement was built with the iron rods, for the projected reinforced concrete pillars, protruding above the ground ever since.

As the Belgrade Philharmonic Orchestra has no building of its own, and after the proposed locations for it on Vračar, near Gradić Pejton, or near the Hotel Jugoslavija, on the Danube river's bank, on 12 October 2016 the city announced an architectural design competition for the new building of the Belgrade Philharmonic on the location of the proposed museum and the surrounding terrain, 47.2 ha (117 acres) in total. In January 2017, out of 34 design entries, the one by Dragan Marčetić and Milan Maksimović won the competition. The central hall will have 1,500 seats and the 400 m^{2} (4,300 sq ft) large stage. The smaller hall was designed to have 400 seats, as well as the outdoor hall. The building will cover an area of 27,000 m^{2} (290,000 sq ft). A park and lookout are planned on the roof while coffee shops, restaurants and luxury boutiques will cover 19,000 m^{2} (200,000 sq ft). The surrounding area will include bicycle paths, a small square, a fountain and an underground garage for 3,960 cars. The estimated value of the project is 30 million euros. In June 2018, Nikola Nikodijević, president of the Belgrade City hall, announced that construction should start in 2020.

Additionally, Marčetić and Maksimović also envisioned four 24-story skyscrapers west of the Palace Serbia, between the new Philharmonic and the YU Business Center shopping mall. The proposed skyscrapers will have a total floor area of 200,000 m^{2} (2,200,000 sq ft) and a two-level underground garage with 47,000 m^{2} (510,000 sq ft).

Even though some deadlines were given and the project was used as the basis for the plan of the detailed regulation of the neighborhood, in August 2018 it was all dismissed. A new, international design competition was to be announced by the end of 2018. According to the new conditions, any high rise is forbidden and nothing can be higher than 31 m (102 ft), which is the height of the Palace of Serbia, which is in the center of Block 13 since 1961. Not only that four skyscrapers will not be built, but even the existing gas station on that location will be removed and a new street will be cut through. One-floor underground garages next to the eastern and western wings of the Palace are also part of the new project. When it comes to the philharmonic itself, it also can't top the Palace's height nor block the view on it, and the architects will have to develop the building around the core ideas of the Arup Group, which was hired because of the acoustics of the future venue. None of the future objects will be fenced.

New competition was organized only in November 2020, and was to last to April 2021. Plans, permits and projects will be finished by 2022/2023, and the new building should be opened in 2026. Projected costs are €120 million, and will be financed by the funds from the Council of Europe Development Bank's credit. Design by the Amanda Levete's "AL_A" bureau was announced as the winner in April 2022, among 37 designs from 15 countries. Levete'с design, awarded $10,2 million, stipulates slightly larger hall, with 1,600 seats for audience and 400 for orchestra and choir, and a total of four large halls which would make the building - grand concert hall, recital hall, creative center and podium. In June 2023 it was announced that the permits will be obtained by the September, when the tender for the contractor will be organized. Construction of the five-storey building with 57,911 m^{2} (623,350 sq ft) was thus announced for 2024, which points to the delay of the 2026 deadline.

== Gathering place ==
Due to its central location and wide-open space, Ušće has hosted some mass gatherings:

- On November 19, 1988, Serbian Communist League's Central Committee chairman Slobodan Milošević addressed the crowd of more than 100,000 people as the main speaker at a mass rally that took place as integral part of "anti-bureaucratic revolution" and in essence served as Milošević's unofficial inauguration.
- On March 11, 1991, Milošević's regime organized a large counter-rally in direct response to March 9th Protest two days earlier. The gathering was seen as the regime's attempt at showing that anti-regime protesters of the prior days were a lone, politically instrumentalized, and misguided group of destructive-minded youth. Milošević himself did not address the crowd, but some of the most prominent members of his Socialist Party of Serbia did. The crowd on hand mostly consisted of older generation members, many of whom were workers and pensioners bussed in for the occasion from other parts of Serbia.
- On October 16, 2014, a military parade by the Serbian Army was held in front of more than 100,000 spectators for the 70th anniversary of the Soviet Red Army liberating city of Belgrade from Nazi Germany. The parade was also part of Russian president Vladimir Putin's official visit. Besides Putin who was the parade's centerpiece guest, the main stand featured Serbian dignitaries, president Tomislav Nikolić and prime minister Aleksandar Vučić as well as Republika Srpska president Milorad Dodik and Republika Srpska prime minister Željka Cvijanović.

=== Concerts and festivals ===
- On July 3, 2004, the rock band Riblja Čorba and the Belgrade faction of the rock band Zabranjeno Pušenje headlined a day-long anniversary concert before 40,000 spectators that came out to celebrate Riblja Čorba's 25th and Zabranjeno Pušenje's 20th anniversary. However, the concert is best remembered by the fact that Zabranjeno Pušenje performance ended after about half an hour, as the band performed world music material they recorded as The No Smoking Orchestra, and the angry fans threw various objects on stage. Other acts that performed included Negative, Prljavi Inspektor Blaža i Kljunovi, Bjesovi, Alogia, Roze Poze, Abonos, Kraljevski Apartman, Đorđe David, and others.
- On June 17, 2006, Serbian turbo-folk singer Ceca Ražnatović performed for more than three hours in front of the crowd of more than 120,000 people, in support of her Idealno loša album that got released the same day, making it one of the most attended concerts in the world.
- On July 14, 2007 The Rolling Stones finally played a concert in Serbia after several previous cancellations. The 2-hour show in front of approximately 49,000 people was part of their A Bigger Bang Tour.
- On June 24, 2008, The Police played a concert in front of the crowd of 27,104 people as part of their reunion tour, with Counting Crows performing as the opening band.
- Since 2008 Belgrade Beer Fest is held at Ušće every August.
- On August 24, 2009, Madonna performed at Ušće in front of 39,713 people as part of the second leg of her Sticky & Sweet Tour.
- On June 19 and June 21, 2010, Ušće Fest was held, with Bajaga i Instruktori and Vlado Georgiev playing on the 19th, and Billy Idol performing on the 21st. The festival was originally organized as a three-day event, but the scheduled performance by Goran Bregović and Severina on the second night, the 22nd, got cancelled due to stormy weather.
- On June 25, 2011, Zdravko Čolić performed a 4-hour concert in front of 100,000 people.
- On May 8, 2012, Metallica held a concert in front of approximately 30,000 people as part of their 2012 European Black Album Tour; they performed their 1991 eponymously titled album in its entirety. The concert featured Gojira and Machine Head as the opening acts.
- From June 27 to June 30, 2012, Belgrade Calling four-day festival was held at Ušće. The first night of the festival featured Jessie J, Orbital, Example, Public Enemy, S.A.R.S. and Dubioza Kolektiv. The second evening of the festival featured Ozzy Osbourne (featuring Geezer Butler and Slash), The Cult, Black Label Society, Paradise Lost, Satyricon and Sanatorium. The third evening of the festival featured Faith No More, Public Image Limited, The Sisters of Mercy, The Darkness, The Horrors and Ugly Kid Joe. The last evening of the festival was free, and featured Serbian acts only: Straight Mickey & The Boys, Snakes, Sharks and Planes, Bjesovi, Svi Na Pod, Eva Braun, Goribor, Darkwood Dub, Kanda, Kodža i Nebojša and Block Out.
- Depeche Mode performed at the park on 19 May 2013 during their Delta Machine Tour, in front of a sold-out crowd of 27,198 people. The band had previously been scheduled to perform at the park on 20 May 2009 as part of their Tour of the Universe, but the concert was cancelled due to singer Dave Gahan's severe bout of gastroenteritis.
- On 15 June 2013, Jelena Karleuša performed a concert called Viva La Diva show in front of some 10.000 people, although she claimed after the event that the crowd was 40,000 strong. The concert was partially marked by many technical problems throughout the event.
- On 28 June 2013, Svetlana Ražnatović Ceca performed the biggest concert of her career which initiated her Poziv Tour in front of more than 150,000 people, promoting the album Poziv, making it one of the most attended concerts in the world.
- From 2014, CoffeeFest (Literary Serbian: Кофифест, Kofifest) a regional, annual coffee festival is held every last weekend in September on the Ušće street in Belgrade, Serbia across the Ušće Shopping Center.
- On 17 June 2015, Robbie Williams performed at the park as part of his Let Me Entertain You Tour, in front of 33,000 people.
- On 20 June 2015, Smak played a concert in front of 25,000 people.
- From August 23 until August 25, 2019, Music Week three-day festival was held at Ušće. The first night of the festival featured Dragana Mirković, Tony Cetinski, Jelena Rozga, Saša Kovačević, and Dženan Lončarević. The second evening of the festival featured Lepa Brena, Aca Lukas, Nina Badrić, Hari Mata Hari, and Darko Lazić. The third evening of the festival featured Buba Corelli & Jala Brat, Maya Berović, Coby, Senidah, Sara Jo, Katarina Grujić, and Angellina.
- Rammstein played two shows in front of 92,464 visitors on 24 and 25 May 2024 as part of their Rammstein Stadium Tour.
- Ed Sheeran performed on 17 August 2024 as part of his +–=÷× Tour.
- Bajaga i Instruktori had concert on 31 August 2024.
- Guns N' Roses performed, with Public Enemy as the opening act, on 18 July 2025 as part of their Because What You Want & What You Get Are Two Completely Different Things Tour.
- Lenny Kravitz is set to perform on 17 June 2026.
- Judas Priest are scheduled to perform on 28 August 2026 as part of their Faithkeepers Tour.

== Bibliography ==
- Beograd – plan grada; M@gic M@p, 2006; ISBN 86-83501-53-1
