= Ceca 2000 =

Studio album by Ceca
- Released: 29 December 1999
- Recorded: 1999
- Genre: Pop-folk; turbo-folk
- Length: 43:12
- Language: Serbian
- Label: PGP-RTS
- Producer: Aleksandar Milić

Ceca chronology
Maskarada (1997)	Ceca 2000 (1999)	Decenija (2001)

Ceca 2000 (Serbian Cyrillic: Цеца 2000), or simply 2000, is the tenth studio album by Serbian singer Ceca. It was released on 29 December 1999 by PGP-RTS.

== Overview ==
The official release of the album took place on 29 December 1999, on the same day Ceca presented the album at the Intercontinental Hotel in Belgrade. The singer held a press conference and also performed several new songs, including "Crveno" and "Crni sneg" in a duet with Aca Lukas. The singer also announced that the album was released in a circulation of 295 thousand copies: 265 thousand on cassettes and 30 thousand on CDs. At the same time, Ceca presented the official calendar for 2000, which was attached as a gift to Pink revija magazine. The photos used for the album cover and calendar were taken by Dejan Milićević. Two music videos "Dokaz" and "Crveno" were also released and both shot by Milićević. In addition, videos were shot for the songs "Oproštajna večera" and "Votka sa utehom", but they were never released. A website www.ceca2000.co.yu was specially launched to promote the album, which became one of the first music sites in Yugoslavia, today the site is no longer active. On 12 January 2000, the singer made her first appearance on television with new material in the Maksovizija program on Pink TV.

Further promotion of the album stopped on 15 January 2000, when Ceca's husband, Željko Ražnatović, was killed.

== Critical reception ==
In 2018, Dragan Marinković from Leskovačke Vesti, when compiling the rating of the "50 best folk albums of all time", placed the album in thirty-second place, noting that it is one of the best albums of both Ceca and the entire Balkan pop-folk music.

== Track listing ==
All lyrics are written by Ljiljana Jorgovanović and Marina Tucaković; all production was handled by Aleksandar Milić.

No.	Title	Music	Arrangement	Length
1.	"Dokaz"	Milić	Milić; Dragan "Struja" Kovačević; Đorđe Janković	4:37
2.	"Oproštajna večera"	Nikos Karvelas	Milić; Kovačević; Janković	4:13
3.	"Crni sneg" (with Aca Lukas)	Hari Varešanović	Varešanović	3:47
4.	"Ja ću prva"	Milić	Milić; Kovačević; Janković	4:21
5.	"Sviće dan"	Milić Vukašinović	Vukašinović	3:09
6.	"Već viđeno"	Milić; Dobrinko Popić	Milić; Kovačević; Janković	3:53
7.	"Crveno"	Milić	Milić; Kovačević; Janković	3:54
8.	"Brat i sestra"	Nenad Stefanović	Milić; Kovačević; Janković; Stefanović	4:07
9.	"Votka sa utehom"	Milić	Milić; Kovačević; Janković	3:58
10.	"Drugarice" (with Luna)	Čeda Čvorak	Darko Lukić; Goran Matić	3:58
11.	"Ako te ona odbije"	Vukašinović	Vukašinović	3:26
Total length:				43:12

Sample credits

- "Oproštajna večera" is a Serbian-language cover of "Antidoto" ("Αντίδοτο", 1998), written by Nikos Karvelas, as performed by Anna Vissi.
- "Crni sneg" is a Serbian-language cover of "Crni snijeg" (1999), penned by Marina Tucaković and composed by Hari Varešanović, as performed by Hanka Paldum and Hari Mata Hari; which itself interpolates "Deli Yaz" (1996), penned by Seda Akay and composed by Niran Ünsal, as performed by Zerrin Özer.
- "Sviće dan" is a Serbian-language cover of "Sviće dan" (1998), penned by Milić Vukašinović and composed by Goran Bregović, as performed by Selma Bajrami.

== Personnel ==
- Ceca – vocals
- Dragan Kovačević Struja – accordion, arrangement, keyboards
- Dragan Ivanović – acoustic guitar, bass guitar, keyboards
- Aleksandar Milić – arrangement, production
- Đorđe Janković – arrangement, co-production, keyboards, mastering, programming, mixing
- Aleksandar Radulović – backing vocals, guitar
- Džej Ramadanovski – backing vocals
- Maja Marković – backing vocals
- Trio "Passage" – backing vocals
- Ivica Maksimović – bouzouki
- Dobrinko Popić – guitar
- Dragan Ristevski – trumpet
- Nebojša Ivanović – trumpet

Credits are adapted from the album's liner notes.
