= Stadion Dr. Milan Jelić =

Stadium in Modriča, Bosnia and Herzegovina

Stadium Dr. Milan Jelić
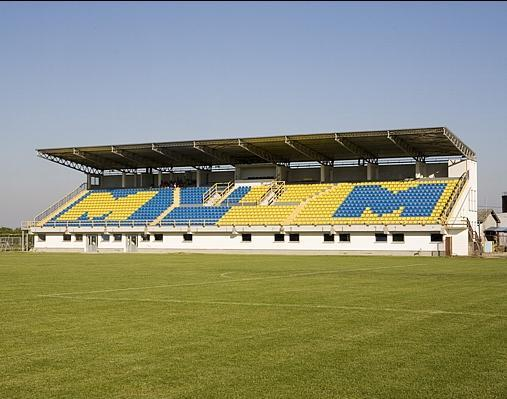
- Interactive map of Stadium Dr. Milan Jelić
- Former names: Stadion Maxima (1964–2007)
- Location: Modriča, Bosnia and Herzegovina
- Coordinates: 44°57′18″N 18°18′29″E
- Owner: FK Alfa Modriča
- Operator: FK Alfa Modriča
- Capacity: 6,000
- Surface: Grass

Construction
- Opened: 1962
- Renovated: 2011

Tenant
- FK Alfa Modriča

Stadium "Dr. Milan Jelić" is a multi-purpose stadium in Modriča, Republika Srpska, Bosnia and Herzegovina. It is currently used mostly for football matches and is the home ground of FK Alfa Modriča. The stadium has a capacity that can hold 6,000 spectators.

== Other notable events ==
One of the first concerts held on the stadium was:

- Svetlana "Ceca" Ražnatović performed a concert as part of her Poziv Tour promoting her album Poziv on 2 August 2014.
