= Decenija =

Studio album by Ceca
- Released: 15 October 2001
- Genre: Pop-folk, Techno-pop
- Length: 42:49
- Label: Grand Production
- Producer: Aleksandar Milić, Dejan Popić

Ceca chronology
Ceca 2000 (1999)	Decenija (2001)	Gore od ljubavi (2004)

Decenija (Serbian Cyrillic: Деценија, lit. 'Decade') is the eleventh studio album by Serbian singer Ceca. It was released in 2001.

Often regarded as "Ceca's best album", it is considered her comeback album after her withdrawal from the public scene following the assassination of her then-husband, Željko Ražnatović Arkan, who was assassinated in 2000.

"Decenija" is Ceca's best selling album to-date with more than 800,000 copies sold.

== About the album ==
After a long break in her career due to an assassination of her then husband Arkan, Ceca returns to the stage with an album "Decenija" (A Decade) and presents her fans who have been eagerly awaiting her return with a new album that many, after all the tragic events, call the album of Ceca's career. The symbolically titled "Decenija" was permeated with hidden sadness and pain, with songs that revealed the soul of a suffering woman and those that called for joy, hope and exhilaration.

Song "Dragane moj" (Dragane of mine) is particularly associated with Ceca's late husband, as the audience felt the emotional charge that Ceca expressed in that song, and all the others, such as the title track "Decenija", "Zabranjeni grad" (Forbidden City), "Zadržaću pravo" (I’ll keep my right), also carried some symbolism and connection with Ceca's tragedy. This album was not without a musical shift either, so Ceca, for the first time, presents herself in a different musical direction in the song "39.2", which is in a techno style with very unusual lyrics. All songs are written and dedicated to her late husband. The album sold 800,000 copies.

== Album information ==
- Producer: Aleksandar Milić
- Co-producer: Đorđe Janković
- Bouzouki: Ivan Maksimović
- Keyboards and accordions: Dragan Kovačević
- Keyboards: Dragan Ivanović
- Bass guitar: Dragan Ivanović
- Acoustic guitars: DragAn Ivanović
- Electric guitars: Nenad Gajin, Dragan Ivanović, Ivan Maksimović
- Saxophone, clarinet, bassoon: Ivica Mit
- Trumpets: Dragančo Ristevski
- Drums: Marko Milivojević
- Percussion: DragAn Ivanović
- Backing vocals: Ivana Ćosić, Aleksandar Milić, Aleksandar *Radulović, Dragan Kovačević
- Audio Mixing: Đorđe Janković, Dragan Vukićević
- Recorded and mixed: Studio "Lucky Sound" 2001, Belgrade
- Photo: Dejan Milićević
- Make-up: Dragan Vurdelja
- Styling: Nenad Todorović
- Hairstyle: Ivan Vacki
- Photo design: Ivan Milijić, Dejan Milićević
- Design: Dragan ŠuhART
- Editor-in-chief: Aleksandar Popović

== Track listing ==
All lyrics are written by Ljiljana Jorgovanović and Marina Tucaković, except where noted; all music is composed by Aleksandar Milić, except where noted; all arrangements were handled by Milić, Dragan Ivanović, Dragan "Struja" Kovačević, Marko Milivojević and Đorđe Janković; all production was handled by Milić.

No.	Title	Lyrics	Music	Length
1.	"Zabranjeni grad"	Jorgovanović; Milić; Tucaković		4:47
2.	"Brže, brže"			3:42
3.	"39.2"			4:56
4.	"Dragane moj"	Jorgovanović; Dobrinko Popić; Tucaković	Popić	3:51
5.	"Zadržaću pravo"			4:13
6.	"Bruka"			3:20
7.	"Batali"			3:55
8.	"Decenija"			4:38
9.	"Tačno je"		Phoebus	4:36
10.	"Nemoj mi prići"		Popić	4:55
Total length:				42:49

Sample credits

- "Zadržaću pravo" contains an interpolation of "Elbette" (2000), penned by Candan Erçetin and composed by Akın Ertübey, as performed by Erçetin herself.
- "Tačno je" is a Serbian-language cover of "Kleinomai" ("Κλείνομαι", 1999), written by Phoebus, as performed by Despina Vandi.
