= Gradiška City Stadium =

Multi-purpose stadium in Gradiška, Bosnia and Herzegovina

Gradski stadion Velimir Sombolac
- Interactive map of Gradski stadion Velimir Sombolac
- Full name: Gradski stadion Velimir Sombolac
- Location: Gradiška, Bosnia and Herzegovina
- Coordinates: 45°08′32″N 17°15′23″E
- Capacity: 5,000
- Surface: Grass

Tenant
- FK Kozara Gradiška

Gradski stadion Velimir Sombolac is a multi-purpose stadium in Gradiška, Bosnia and Herzegovina. It is currently used mostly for football matches and is the home ground of FK Kozara Gradiška of the First League of the Republika Srpska. The stadium holds 5,000 spectators.

Renamed in April 2021 in honor of club's former manager and legend Velimir Sombolac.

== Concerts and Events ==
- Lepa Brena held a concert on the stadium (1983) and also filmed some stadium scenes and the concert footage here, to be used in her film Nema problema (1984) and performed a concert in front of 20,000 people.
- Svetlana Ražnatović CECA performed a concert as part of her Poziv Tour in front of 15,000 people, promoting her album Poziv on 12 July 2013.
