= Millennium Centar =

Indoor arena in Vršac, Serbia

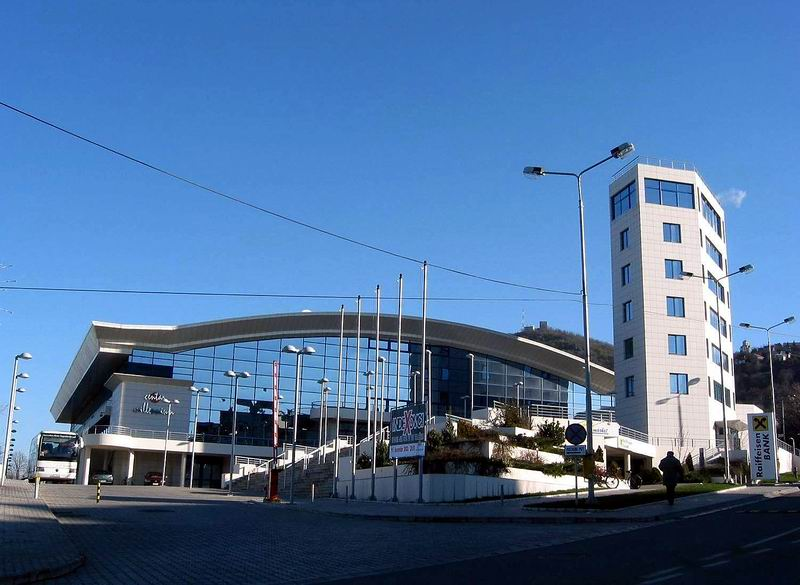
- Interactive map of Millennium Centar
- Location: Vršac, Vojvodina, Serbia
- Coordinates: 45°7′5.05″N 21°18′38.52″E
- Capacity: 4,400

Construction
- Opened: April 5, 2001
- Architect: Petar Arsić

Tenants
- KK Vršac (2001–present); ŽKK Vršac (2001–present)

Website
- http://www.millennium.rs/

The Millennium Centar (Serbian: Центар Миленијум, Centar Milenijum) is a multi-purpose indoor arena located in the city of Vršac. It is the home ground of basketball club KK Vršac and ŽKK Vršac and has a capacity of 4,400 seats. The arena is also used for concerts and other live entertainment.

== History ==
The arena was officially opened on April 5, 2001. The arena hosted the Group A of the EuroBasket 2005, the basketball competitions of the 2009 Summer Universiade and the Group D of the 2012 European Men's Handball Championship.

== Concerts & events ==
- Svetlana Ceca Ražnatović performed a concert as part of her Poziv Tour promoting her album Poziv on 5. April 2014.

== See also ==
- List of indoor arenas in Serbia
