= Ražnatović =

Ražnatović (Cyrillic: Ражнатовић) is a surname originating from Serbia. It may refer to the following people:

- Anastasija Ražnatović (born 1998), Serbian singer and model
- Željko Ražnatović Arkan (1952–2000), Serbian warlord
- Dragoslav Ražnatović (born 1941), Serbian basketball player
- Svetlana Ceca Ražnatović (born 1973), Serbian singer and wife of Željko Ražnatović Arkan
- Miško Ražnatović (born 1966), Serbian lawyer and sports agent.
