= Babaroga (disambiguation) =

Babaroga, also Baba Roga is the Serbo-Croatian name for Baba Yaga.

Babaroga, may also refer to:

- Babaroga (game company)
- Babaroga (album)
- Babaroga (Kerber song)
- Babaroga (Let 3 song)
