= Ljubav živi =

Studio album by Ceca
- Released: 17 June 2011
- Recorded: 2010–11
- Genre: Pop, Folk
- Label: Milligram Music
- Producer: Aleksandar Milić - Mili

Ceca chronology
Idealno loša (2006)	Ljubav živi (2011)	Poziv (2013)

Ljubav živi (Serbian Cyrillic: Љубав живи, lit. 'Love Lives') is the fourteenth studio album by Serbian pop-folk singer Ceca. It was released on 17 June 2011, exactly five years after the release of her previous album.

== Track listing ==
1. Rasulo
2. Hajde
3. Šteta za mene
4. Igračka samoće
5. Ona
6. Nije mi dobro
7. Hvata me
8. Sve što imam i nemam
9. Ljubav živi

== Personnel ==
- Music, produced & arrangement by: Aleksandar Milić-Mili
- Author: Ljiljana Jorgovanović, Marina Tucaković
- Female back-vocals - Ivana Peters (all songs)
- Sound design - Ivan Milosavljević-Milke
- Pre-mix - Ivan Milosavljević-Milke
- Mix - Siniša Kokerić, Ivan Milosavljević-Milke (in "PRINC" studio in 2011)
- Mastering - James Cruz (New York)
- Design - OMAR

== Release history ==
Region	Date	Label	Format	Version
Serbia	17 June 2011	Miligram Music	CD, digital download	Original release
Bosnia and Herzegovina	17 June 2011	Miligram Music	CD, digital download	Original release
Montenegro	17 June 2011	Miligram Music	CD, digital download	Original release
