= Autogram (album) =

Studio album by Ceca
- Released: 25 June 2016
- Genre: Turbo-folk
- Length: 38:31
- Label: Ceca Music
- Producer: Damir Handanović

Ceca chronology
Poziv (2013)	Autogram (2016)

Autogram (Serbian Cyrillic: Аутограм, lit. 'Autograph') is the sixteenth studio album by Serbian pop-folk singer Ceca. It was released on 25 June 2016, approximately three years after the release of her previous album Poziv.

In late 2015, Ceca announced that she was working on a new studio album. At the beginning of 2016, she stated that the album would likely be released in June. On 19 June, she revealed the album’s title and tracklist. The following day, she unveiled the album’s cover art, accompanied by a promotional video featuring a snippet of the song “Didule.” She also confirmed that the album would be released on 25 June. Shortly thereafter, the Serbian website Puls Online published a banner advertisement for the album, which played a snippet of the song “Trepni” when users hovered their mouse over it.

Two additional tracks from the album, “Autogram” and “Cigani,” premiered on Serbian radio on 24 June. That same evening, lyric videos for all of the album’s songs were uploaded to Ceca’s official YouTube channel. The album sold 150,000 copies.

== Writing and composition ==
The album Autogram was recorded between 2015 and 2016, following the departure of Aleksandar Milić, who had collaborated with Ceca for over 20 years. Despite his absence, several long-time associates—including Damir Handanović, Ljiljana Jorgovanović, and Marina Tucaković—contributed to the songwriting and production of the album. Notably, Ceca's daughter, Anastasija Ražnatović, provided backing vocals on some of the tracks.

Lyrically, the album explores themes such as infidelity, female perspectives, and the emotional pain often associated with love and heartbreak.

The production team featured a number of experienced collaborators, co-producers, and mixing engineers, including Mirko Gavrić, Damir Handanović, Senad Bislimi, and Marko Cvetković. The album was mixed by multiple engineers, contributing to its reputation for high sound quality. The album's popularity on streaming platforms, particularly YouTube, reflects its commercial success and widespread listener appeal.

== Track listing ==
No.	Title	Lyrics	Music	Length
1.	"Autogram"	Marina Tucaković; Milan Radulović	Damir Handanović; Senad Bislimi; Gavric	3:13
2.	"Dobrotvorne svrhe"	Tucaković	Bojan Vasić; Marko Cvetković	3:31
3.	"Didule"	Tucaković	Damir Handanović; Senad Bislimi; Gavric	3:24
4.	"Trepni"	Tucaković	Vasić; Cvetković	4:20
5.	"Metar odavde"	Tucaković; Aleksandar Tomić	Vasić; Cvetković	3:32
6.	"Anđeo drugog reda"	Ljiljana Jorgovanović; Tucaković	Handanović	3:11
7.	"Luda za sebe"	Tucaković	Kiki Lesendrić	3:01
8.	"Cigani"	Jorgovanović; Tucaković	Handanović; Gavrić	3:25
9.	"Netačan odgovor"	Tucaković	Handanović	3:24
10.	"Jadna ti je moja moć"	Tucaković	Handanović; Dušan Alagić; Endži Mavrić	3:10
11.	"Nevinost"	Biljana Spasić	Milan Dimitrijević; Husa Alijević; Handanović	4:20
Total length:				38:31
