= Džamba =

Romani Yugoslavian gangster, disappeared 1992

Iso Lero
- Born: 1953; Belgrade, SFR Yugoslavia
- Disappeared: 23 September 1992 (aged 38–39)
- Citizenship: Yugoslav
- Spouse: Snežana Lero
- Relatives: Džej Ramadanovski
- Imprisoned at: Belgrade Central Prison, Italy

Iso Lero, known by his nickname Džamba, was a Romani Yugoslavian gangster based in Belgrade, Serbia. He was called "the Don of Dorćol". He disappeared on 23 September 1992 after having received a beating from several members of the Serb Volunteer Guard paramilitary near the Beograđanka building.

== Early life ==
Džamba was born in an ethnic Romani family in 1953. He grew up on Dobračina Street in the Belgrade neighborhood of Dorćol where his family shared a yard with Džamba's maternal cousin, singer Džej Ramadanovski.

== Criminal career ==
Džamba began his criminal career in his youth. He was jailed at the Central Prison in 1976 for purse snatching and fighting at a bus station in Belgrade. While in prison, Džamba memorized the Criminal Code and offered legal advice to other inmates. In prison, he was often severely beaten up by the Central Prison guards due to his rebellious nature. Džamba was often violent towards rapists and homosexuals.

During the 1970s and 1980s, he, as many Yugoslav criminals, committed crimes in Italy, Germany and France, but not in Yugoslavia. At first in conflict with Đorđe Božović "Giška", they became friends while imprisoned in Italy. He was a close associate of Aleksandar "Knele" Knežević, underboss in the Voždovac gang.

Džamba owned a detective firm called "Karmen". On several occasions, he led goon squads engaged in breaking up labor strikes in several firms.

== Disappearance ==
Džamba disappeared on 23 September 1992 at the age of 39 after being beaten up by casino security headed by Vukašin Gojak, a member of the Serb Volunteer Guard paramilitary. Gojak was guarding the casino on the 6th floor of the Beograđanka building. According to Gojak, Džamba tried to enter the casino drunk and without a ticket, and brandished a firearm at one of the guards when he was denied access. Gojak claimed to not know of his whereabouts after casino security had him removed from the building.

According to Džamba's wife Snežana Lero, a group of the Serb Volunteer Guard and Delije beat Džamba unconscious before driving him off to their camp in Erdut and burying his body there. Campaigning for the 1993 election, politician Vojislav Šešelj claimed Arkan had planned the murder, and that he was in contact with an eyewitness. Allegedly, Arkan and Džamba had a falling out in March 1992 when Džamba accidentally shot a framed picture of Arkan in the restaurant Zona Zamfirova.

According to the Foreign Broadcast Information Service, Džamba belonged to a string of murdered criminals from Serbia who all had one thing in common, namely a lack of "good backing" in the police. The man accused of his murder, Vukašin Gojak, was shot and killed by a sniper in the neighborhood of Kosutnjak on 13 September 1997. Džamba's killer was never found.

== Songwriting ==
In an interview given to Politika, Džamba's cousin Džej Ramadanovski stated that Džamba wrote the lyrics of two songs he later recorded and published. One was "Teško je živeti" from album "Zar ja da ti brišem suze" and the other was "Žuta ruža/To je žena mojih snova" published on his album "1,2".

== See also ==
- List of people who disappeared mysteriously (2000–present)
