= Poziv Tour =

2013–16 concert tour by Ceca

- Tour by Ceca
- Promotional poster for concert in Kragujevac at Stadion Čika Dača, September 2013
- Associated album: Poziv
- Start date: 28 June 2013
- End date: 7 May 2016
- Legs: 2
- No. of shows: Europe 26 Asia 1; Total 27

Ceca concert chronology
- Ljubav živi Tour (2012–13); Poziv Tour (2013–16); Autogram Tour (2016–20)

Poziv Tour was an eighth concert tour by Serbian singer Ceca, in support of her fifteenth studio album Poziv (2013). It began on 28 June 2013, in Belgrade, Serbia, at the Ušće and concluded on 7 May 2016, in Thessaloniki, Greece at the Fix live. During the tour she held the biggest concert of her career. The concert in Belgrade was attended by more than 150,000 people, and was one of the highest-attended concerts in the world.

== Background ==
On tour, Ceca promoted a music album entitled Poziv, which was published in June 2013. At concerts, she presented eight songs: Poziv, Dobro sam proša, Mrzi me, Da raskinem sa njom, Ime i prezimi, 5 minuta, Turbulentno and Brat. Ceca visited 14 European countries and the United Arab Emirates as part of the tour. She performed a total of 69 concerts.

Even within the framework of the Poziv tour, the interest of the electronic media in the live broadcast of Cece's concerts was great. Thus, in 2013, Belgrade's Pink television broadcast three of the singer's concerts in their entirety.

Part of the proceeds from the sale of tickets (from concerts in the period May-September 2014) was intended for those at risk in the floods that affected the Balkan countries. At some concerts, the collection of funds was organized by the visitors.

On the day of the concert, activists of the political party Vojvođanska Partija hung banners around the venue of the Tamburicafest festival, where Ceca performed. As they said, what bothers them the most is the fact that a singer who promotes a different genre of music is invited to a festival that promotes tambura music. At the same time, a petition entitled "Stop the concert of Cece in the Fortress of Novi Sad" was created online. The authors of the petition stated that they find it controversial that Ceca, who belongs to a group of unpunished criminals from the 90s, is performing in Novi Sad. The singer reported the website to the police. The concert was held without riots, and Ceca gathered a record number of people.

== Set list ==
The following set list is representative of the concert at the Serbian Republic Square, held on 31 December 2013.

1. Nevaljala
2. Lepi grome moj
3. Beograd
4. Idi dok si mlad
5. Zaboravi
6. Neodoljiv-neumoljiv
7. Pet minuta
8. Doktor
9. Vazduh koji dišem
10. Brat
11. Nagovori
12. Ime i prezime
13. Da raskinem sa njom
14. Kad bi bio ranjen
15. Žuto pile
16. Poziv
17. Lepotan
18. Volela sam, volela
19. Turbulentno
20. Pazi s kime spavaš
21. Votka sa utehom
22. Maskarada
23. Dobro sam prošla
24. Sve što imam i nemam

== Tour dates ==
List of tour concerts, showing date, city, country, venue, number of available tickets and amount of gross revenue
Date	City	Country	Venue
Europe
28 June 2013	Belgrade	Serbia	Ušće
12 July 2013	Gradiška	Bosnia and Herzegovina	Gradski stadion
21 July 2013	Budva	Montenegro	Top Hill
26 July 2013	Zvornik	Bosnia and Herzegovina	Club Viktoria
28 July 2013	Vrnjačka Banja	Serbia	Stadion Raj
4 August 2013	Budva	Montenegro	Top Hill
14 September 2013	Kragujevac	Serbia	Čika Dača Stadium
28 September 2013	Niš	Serbia	Niš Fortress
15 November 2013	Klagenfurt	Austria	Wörthersee Arena
16 November 2013	Vösendorf	Austria	Pyramide
22 November 2013	Novi Sad	Serbia	SPENS
23 November 2013	Novi Sad	Serbia	SPENS
6 December 2013	Antwerp	Belgium	Zaal Atrium
7 December 2013	München	Germany	VIP club
14 December 2013	Dietikon	Switzerland	Stadthalle
27 December 2013	Subotica	Serbia	Hala sportova
31 December 2013	Belgrade	Serbia	Republic Square
8 March 2014	Frankfurt	Germany	Union Halle
14 March 2014	Šabac	Serbia	Zorka Hall
21 March 2014	Ljubljana	Slovenia	Gospodarsko razstavišče
22 March 2014	Ljubljana	Slovenia	Gospodarsko razstavišče
29 March 2014	Bellinzona	Switzerland	Espo Centro
5 April 2014	Vršac	Serbia	Millennium Hall
10 May 2014	Vösendorf	Austria	Pyramide
24 May 2014	Hamburg	Germany	Festplatz Nord
21 June 2014	Maribor	Slovenia	Ribičija
4 October 2014	Trebinje	Bosnia and Herzegovina	Aerodrom Zupci
7 November 2014	Sofia	Bulgaria	Arena Armeec
15 November 2014	Berlin	Germany	Loewe Saal
29 November 2014	Zürich	Switzerland	Stadthalle
13 December 2014	München	Germany	Bavaria Filmstadt
27 December 2014	Skopje	Macedonia	Dvorana Boris Trajkovski
31 December 2014	Beograd	Serbia	Belexpo centar
13 January 2015	Novi Sad	Serbia	Trg Slobode
28 February 2015	Spijkenisse	Netherlands	Club XO
21 March 2015	Luzern	Switzerland	D'LUX - The Club
15 May 2015	Razgrad	Bulgaria	Stadion Ludogorec
16 May 2015	Zürich	Switzerland	Face Club
6 June 2015	Podgorica	Montenegro	Stadion Fudbalski kamp
26 June 2015	Budva	Montenegro	Top Hill
9 August 2015	Budva	Montenegro	Top Hill
21 August 2015	Nesebar	Bulgaria	Mestni stadion
23 August 2015	Blace	Serbia	Mestni trg
25 August 2015	Zlatibor	Serbia	Tić polje
28 August 2015	Zrenjanin	Serbia	Trg slobode
5 September 2015	Salzburg	Austria	Triebwerk-west
20 September 2015	Štip	Macedonia	Mestni Square
7 November 2015	Dornbirn	Austria	Messehalle
21 November 2015	Vienna	Austria	Pyramide
24 November 2015	Moscow	Russia	Jotaspace
10 December 2015	Dubai	United Arab Emirates	Purobeach
31 December 2015	Kruševac	Serbia	Trg Kosovskih junaka
13 January 2016	Niš	Serbia	Trg republike
30 January 2016	Luzern	Switzerland	D'Lux Club
6 February 2016	München	Germany	Kesselhaus
16 April 2016	Kranj	Slovenia	Športna dvorana Zlato polje
7 May 2016	Thessaloniki	Greece	Fix live

=== Box office score data ===
Venue	City	Tickets Sold
Ušće	Belgrade	150.000
Gradski stadion	Gradiška	15.000
Top Hill	Budva	10.000
Club Viktoria	Zvornik	2.000
Stadion Raj	Vrnjačka Banja	20.000
Čika Dača Stadium	Kragujevac	18.000
Niš Fortress	Niš	15.000
Wörthersee arena	Klagenfurt	5.000
Pyramide	Vösendorf	8.000
SPENS	Novi Sad	20.000
TOTAL		250,000
