= Ludo srce =

Studio album by Ceca
- Released: May 1989
- Label: PGP-RTB
- Producer: Dobrivoje Ivanković

Ceca chronology
Cvetak zanovetak (1988)	Ludo srce (1989)	Pustite me da ga vidim (1990)

Ludo srce (Serbian Cyrillic: Лудо срце, lit. 'Crazy Heart') is the second studio album by Serbian singer Ceca. It was released in May 1989 on LP and MC. It has never been released on CD.

== Track listing ==
1. Ludo srce (Crazy heart)
2. Lepotan (Beauty)
3. Budi dečko moj (Be my boyfriend)
4. Greška (Mistake)
5. Zabraniću srcu da te voli (I will forbid my heart from loving you)
6. Dođi (Come to me)
7. Hej, ljubavi, ljubavi (Hey, my love, my love)
8. Od glave do pete (From head to toe)
