= Anastasija Ražnatović =

Serbian singer (born 1998)

Anastasija Анастасија
- Also known as: Anastasija Gudelj
- Born: Anastasija Ražnatović; 25 May 1998 (age 28); Belgrade, Serbia, FR Yugoslavia
- Genres: Pop; electropop; dance-pop
- Occupations: Singer; songwriter; model
- Instrument: Vocals
- Years active: 2018–present
- Label: Ceca Music
- Spouse: Nemanja Gudelj (m. 2023)

Anastasija Gudelj (née Ražnatović; Serbian Cyrillic: Анастасија Гудељ, née Ражнатовић; born 25 May 1998), professionally known simply as Anastasija, is a Serbian singer and model. She is the daughter of Ceca and Arkan. Anastasija pursued her music career with the release of her debut single "Savršen par" in July 2018.

== Early life ==
Ražnatović was born on 25 May 1998 in Belgrade, FR Yugoslavia. She is the daughter of singer Svetlana "Ceca" Ražnatović and career criminal, politician and the founder of the paramilitary formation Serb Volunteer Guard Željko "Arkan" Ražnatović. When she was less than two years old, she lost her father, after he was assassinated on 15 January 2000. Ražnatović has an older brother, Veljko, and seven half-siblings from her father's previous relationships. After graduating from high school, she attended business school.

== Career ==
In 2016, Anastasija began modeling for the fur coat brand Inverno Caldo. Pictures of her from the campaign were featured in an article in the February 2018 issue of the British Vogue.

In June 2016, Anastasija's mother Ceca released her sixteenth studio album Autogram; Anastasija was revealed to have contributed some of the backing vocals on it. In July 2018, Anastasija made her recording debut by releasing the single "Savršen par" (Perfect Pairing) under her mother's record label Ceca Music. Anastasija herself wrote the song alongside Darko Dimitrov. As of January 2023, its music video has accumulated over 68 million views on YouTube. Her next single, titled "Rane" (Wounds), was released in March the following year. It managed to surpass the success of the previous release, collecting million views during the first nine hours and 88 million views overall.

During the 2020, Ražnatović released three singles: "Heroina" (Heroine), "Volim te" (I Love You) and "Promašena" (Missed). A year later on 25 May, she released the singles "Gotovo" (Over) and "Izvini" (Sorry). Subsequently, "Ubica" (Killer) was released in January 2022. In July that year, Anastasija also collaborated with Serbian recording artist MC Stojan on the single "Otkaz" (Dismissal). In October 2022, Anastasija began appearing alongside her family on the reality television show Ceca Show: Ceca i deca broadcast on Blic TV.

== Personal life ==
In March 2022, Ražnatović began dating Serbian footballer Nemanja Gudelj. In August 2023, Ražnatović and Gudelj married in a secret ceremony at Rajinovac.

In June 2022, she reached one million followers on Instagram, becoming the sixth most followed person in Serbia.

== Discography ==
=== Singles ===
Title	Year	Album
"Savršen par"	2018	Non-album singles
"Rane"	2019	Non-album singles
"Heroina"	2020	Non-album singles
"Volim te"	2020	Non-album singles
"Promašena"	2020	Non-album singles
"Izvini"	2021	Non-album singles
"Gotovo"	2021	Non-album singles
"Ubica"	2022	Non-album singles
"Otkaz" (with MC Stojan)	2022	Non-album singles
"Brani me"	2023	Non-album singles
"Prava"	2024	Non-album singles
"Kadar"	2024	Non-album singles

=== Guest appearances ===
Title	Year	Other artist(s)	Album
"Ton po ton"	2025	Elena	Déjà vu

== Awards and nominations ==
Year	Award	Category	Nominee/work	Result	Ref.
2019	Music Awards Ceremony	Breakthrough Act	Herself	Nominated	
