= Pustite me da ga vidim =

Pustite me da ga vidim / To Miki

Studio album by Ceca
- Released: 1990
- Studio: Studio HIT
- Label: PGP-RTB
- Producer: Dobrivoje Ivanković, Miroljub Aranđelović

Ceca chronology
Ludo srce (1989)	Pustite me da ga vidim / To Miki (1990)	Babaroga (1991)

Pustite me da ga vidim (Serbian Cyrillic: Пустите ме да га видим, lit. 'Let Me See Him'), also known as To Miki (Serbian Cyrillic: То Мики, lit. 'Yes Mickey'), is the third studio album by Serbian singer Ceca. It was released in 1990. Unlike her previous two albums, it was released LP and MC, as well as on CD (with twelve bonus tracks from the first two albums.)

== Track listing ==
1. To, Miki
2. Pustite me da ga vidim
3. Cipelice
4. Lako je tebi
5. Drugarice prokletnice
6. Sve u svoje vreme
7. Ne daj me
8. Eh, teško meni
