= CoffeeFest =

Annual coffee festival in Belgrade, Serbia

CoffeeFest (Literary Serbian: Кофифест, Kofifest) is a regional, annual coffee festival that is held every last weekend in September on the Ušće street in Belgrade, Serbia, across the Ušće Shopping Center. The Belgrade coffee, tea and hot beverage festival is supported by the Serbian Ministry of Trade, Tourism and Telecommunications, City of Belgrade Belgrade Tourism Organization, Serbian Tourism Organization, and the Serbian Chamber of Commerce. The festival organizer is a PCO company Oivivio LLC headquartered in Beverly Hills, California.

Exhibit area consists of over 2,000 m^{2} is set up on the closed-for-traffic street passing by the shopping mall. Among the exhibitors there was importers, distributors and roasters of domestic, traditional coffee, espresso, single origin coffees, espresso machines, capsules, pods, instant coffees, water, teas, milk for coffee, RTD coffee and more. The first CoffeeFest held on September 26–27, 2014 hosted 37 brands on 29 exhibition booths and had participants from Greece, Hungary, Italy, Lebanon, the Netherlands, Poland, Serbia, Switzerland and United States and attracted 18,210 visitors from Serbia and neighboring countries.

Exhibitors at first CoffeeFest were manufacturers, distributors and companies whose business include:

- Coffee, tea, tea biscuits, chocolate, milk, creamers, water, syrup, sugar, cocoa and other supplements for coffee and tea
- Professional and home coffee-making machines and vending, water filters and cleaning agents
- Organizations, institutions and associations dealing with catering, food, nutrition and medicine, as well as research, training, consultancy and certification of hot drinks and accompanying products

== Barista training ==
CoffeeFest organizers provided training for almost 50 baristas. Advanced training attended 38 baristas. Trainers donated their time, energy and knowledge so the training was free of charge for all baristas. Barista Training was conducted by Mr. Ivan Abramo and Molinari Coffee from Italy and Java Coffee Company from Poland.

== Program ==
In addition to sampling a variety of coffees and teas, visitors attended entertainment programs, musical performances, and competitions. Baristas demonstrated coffee-making techniques, including espresso preparation and latte art, and provided information on selecting coffee machines. Visitors could also learn about coffee cultivation, consumption practices in different parts of the world and the beverage's effects on health, ] Activities for children included a dedicated children's area and a program promoting awareness of recycling.

== Media coverage ==
Media coverage of CoffeeFest 2014 contains more than 150 media items in the print, radio, TV and electronic media. Media showed a lot of interest for the first regional coffee Festival and reported on the event in all its phases.
