= Koštana =

Koštana (Serbian Cyrillic: Коштана) is a play written by Borisav Stanković. It was first published in Belgrade in 1902. Set in Stanković's native Vranje in southern Serbia, it features themes of Serbian folklore and patriarchal customs in the late nineteenth century.

The Serbian composer Petar Konjović wrote an opera of the same name based on the play.
