= Cvetak Zanovetak =

Cvetak zanovetak

Studio album by Ceca
- Released: 1988
- Label: PGP-RTB
- Producer: Dobrivoje Ivanković

Ceca chronology
Cvetak zanovetak (1988)	Ludo srce (1989)

Cvetak zanovetak (Serbian Cyrillic: Цветак зановетак, lit. 'Nagging Flower') is the first studio album by Serbian singer Ceca. It was released in 1988 on LP and MC. It has never been released on CD.

== Track listing ==
1. Cvetak zanovetak (Nagging flower)
2. Želim te u mladosti (I want you while I'm young)
3. Đački spomenari (Yearbooks)
4. Veliko srce (Big heart)
5. Kuda žuriš (What is the hurry?)
6. Očima te pijem (I am drinking you with my eyes)
7. Detelina sa četiri lista (Four leaf clover)
8. Eto, eto, prođe leto (There, There, Summer's over)
9. Ja tebe hoću (I want you)
