= Coffee Fest Sarajevo =

Festival held in Sarajevo, Bosnia and Herzegovina

- Status: active
- Genre: Coffee festival
- Location: Sarajevo
- Country: Bosnia and Herzegovina
- Years active: 2014-present

Coffee Fest Sarajevo is an international coffee festival that is held annually in Sarajevo, Bosnia and Herzegovina. The festival was established in 2014 by the Profesional Association in cooperation with the Bosnian Ministry of Trade. Festival partners include Robert Bosch GmbH and Tesla, Inc. It is held in numerous venues across the city, which include the Skenderija Center and MyFace.

The first edition of Coffee Fest Sarajevo was held from 24 to 27 February 2014 and hosted 29 brands that were showcased on 18 exhibition booths. Participating brands came from Brazil, Croatia, France, Greece, Hungary, Italy, Lebanon, the Netherlands, Poland, Portugal, Tunisia, Turkey, Serbia, Switzerland and the United States. It attracted over 10,000 visitors from Bosnia and Herzegovina and neighboring countries.

Exhibitors at the Coffee Fest Sarajevo are manufacturers, distributors and companies whose business include:

- Coffee, tea, tea biscuits, chocolate, milk, creamers, water, syrup, sugar, cocoa and other supplements for coffee and tea.
- Professional and home coffee-making machines and vending, water filters and cleaning agents.
- Organizations, institutions and associations dealing with catering, food, nutrition and medicine, as well as research, training, consultancy and certification of hot drinks and accompanying products.

== Barista training ==
The organizers provide free training for over 50 baristas per edition. A team of international trainers donate their time, energy and knowledge while also showcasing their moves to audiences. Barista Training has been headed by the Delta Cafés company from Portugal since 2015.

== Latte Art Challenge ==
An annual competition in Latte art design is also organized. A panel of international baristas judges the designs, with the winner receiving a cash prize.
