= Idealno loša =

Studio album by Ceca
- Released: 17 June 2006
- Recorded: 2005–06, Miligrammusic Studios
- Genre: Pop, Pop folk, R'n'B
- Length: 39:36
- Label: Ceca Music, Milligram Music
- Producer: Aleksandar Milić-Mili

Ceca chronology
Gore od ljubavi (2004)	Idealno loša (2006)	Ljubav živi (2011)

Idealno loša (Serbian Cyrillic: Идеално лоша, lit. 'Ideally Bad') is the thirteenth studio album by Serbian pop-folk singer Ceca. It was released on 17 June 2006.

== Track listing ==
No.	Title	Lyrics	Music	Length
1.	"Lepi grome moj"	Ljiljana Jorgovanović	Aleksandar Milić-Mili	3:50
2.	"Idealno loša"	Ljiljana Jorgovanović	A.Milić-Mili	4:03
3.	"Manta, manta"	Ljiljana Jorgovanović	A.Milić-Mili	3:23
4.	"Pile"	Marina Tucaković	A.Milić-Mili	4:25
5.	"Čulo bola"	Marina Tucaković	A.Perišić-Romario	2:53
6.	"Ponuđen k'o počašćen"	Marina Tucaković	A.Milić-Mili	4:43
7.	"Koža pamti"	Ljiljana Jorgovanović	A.Perišić-Romario	3:39
8.	"Čudo"	Ljiljana Jorgovanović	A.Milić-Mili	3:49
9.	"Viski"	Marina Tucaković	A.Milić-Mili	4:02
10.	"Rekom bez vode"	Marina Tucaković	A.Milić-Mili	4:19
Total length:				39:36

== Charts ==
Chart performance for Idealno loša
Chart (2006)	Peak position
Croatian International Album Chart (HDU)	15
