= Džej Ramadanovski =

Serbian singer (1964–2020)

Džej Ramadanovski Џеј Рамадановски
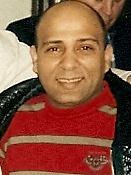
- Džej in 1998

Background information
- Born: 29 May 1964; Belgrade, SR Serbia, SFR Yugoslavia
- Died: 6 December 2020 (aged 56) Belgrade, Serbia
- Genres: Folk; turbo-folk; pop-folk
- Occupation: Singer
- Instrument: Voice
- Years active: 1987–2020
- Labels: Diskos; Diskoton; PGP-RTS; Komuna; Jugodisk; Grand

Džej Ramadanovski (Serbian Cyrillic: Џеј Рамадановски; 29 May 1964 – 6 December 2020) was a Serbian singer. Debuted in 1987 with "Zar ja da ti brišem suze", during his life he released thirteen studio albums and a couple of standalone singles. Džej was known for balladic kafana songs like: "Nedelja", "Gde ću sad, moja ružo" and "Uspeo sam u životu", as well as for up-beat turbo-folk records like: "Ko se s nama druži", "Seksi ritam" and "Lubenica".

== Early life ==
Ramadanovski was born on 29 May 1964 in Belgrade, SFR Yugoslavia to parents Mazlam and Barija Ramadanovski. His family is of Muslim Romani descent and comes from the town of Resen in today's Macedonia. Ramadanovski grew up in the downtown neighborhood of Dorćol, where he continued living for the rest of his life. Following his parents' divorce, he began running away from school because of which he was accepted to a youth detention center. After completing military service, Ramadanovski worked at the factory of agricultural machinery 'Zmaj'.

== Career ==
Džej began recording music after he had been discovered by songwriters Marina Tucaković, Aleksandar Radulović and Sava Bojić. He rose to prominence by appearing on the International Music Fair (MESAM) in 1987 with the song "Zar ja da ti brišem suze", finishing as the runner-up. The following year, he released his debut studio album under Diskoton. Ramadanovski gained more significant popularity during the 1990s. In 1991, he held his first solo concert at the Tašmajdan. At the peak of his popularity, Ramadanovski also toured outside Yugoslavia in countries such as Germany, Sweden, Canada and the United States. In 2008, he competed at the Grand Music Festival with the song "Imati pa nemati", again finishing in 2nd place. Ramadanovski was nominated for the Male Folk Singer of the Year at the 2011 Serbian Popularity Oscar.

Additionally to music, Džej made cameo appearances in movies Hajde da se volimo 2 (1989) and Vikend sa ćaletom (2020).

== Personal life, death and legacy ==
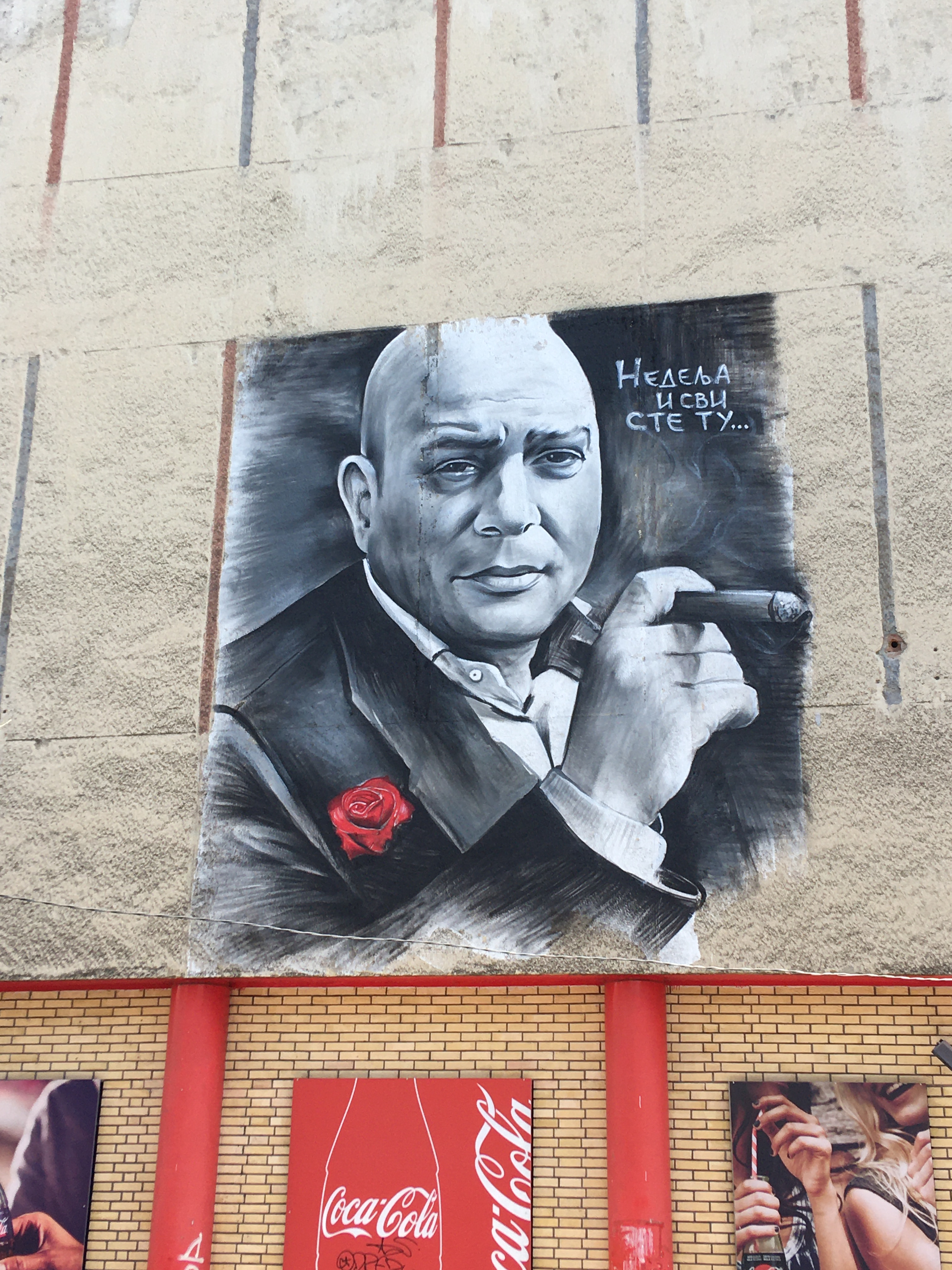
Džej Ramadanovski mural, Dorćol, Jevrejska 2, 2021

In an interview with Politika, Ramadanovski stated that he was related to mobster Iso Lero "Džamba", who wrote several of his songs. He had two daughters with his former wife, Nada. At the beginning of 2020, a blood clot was found on his heart valve during an examination. On 6 December 2020, Ramadanovski died from a heart attack, at the age of 56. On December 11, he was buried at the Alley of Meritorious Citizens in Belgrade. His life and career were dramatized in the 2024 biopic Nedelja, directed by Nemanja Ćeranić and starring Husein Alijević as Ramadanovski.

== Discography ==
Studio albums

- Zar ja da ti brišem suze (1988)
- Ljubio sam, nisam znao (1988)
- Jedan, dva (1989)
- Ko se s nama druži (1991)
- Blago onom ko rano poludi (1992)
- Rađaj sinove (1993)
- Sa moje tačke gledišta (1995)
- Upalite za mnom sveće (1996)
- Na ivici pakla (1997)
- Oprosti majko (1998)
- Zato (1999)
- Ludo vino (2001)
- Vozi, vozi... (2003)
