= Babaroga (album) =

Studio album by Ceca
- Released: 1991
- Studio: Studio "HIT"
- Genre: Pop, Serbian Music, Serbian folk
- Label: PGP-RTB
- Producer: Dobrivoje Ivanković, Miroljub Kemiš

Ceca chronology
Pustite me da ga vidim (1990)	Babaroga (1991)	Šta je to u tvojim venama (1993)

Babaroga (Serbian Cyrillic: Бабарога, lit. 'Baba Yaga') is the fourth studio album by Serbian singer Ceca. It was released in 1991.

== Track listing ==
- All music by Dobrivoje Ivanković, except tracks 3 and 9 (Miroljub Kemiš). All lyrics as noted.
1. Babaroga (Lyrics: Ivanković)
2. Volim te (Lyrics: Ilonka Tadić)
3. Izbriši, vetre, trag (Lyrics: Stevica Spasić)
4. Hej, vršnjaci (Lyrics: Mirjana Bukovčić Trišić)
5. Sto put' sam se zaklela (Lyrics: Ivanković)
6. Da si nekad do bola voleo (Lyrics: Marija Nikolić)
7. Ne kuni majko (Lyrics: Violeta Mićović)
8. Bivši (Lyrics: Dragan Stodić)
9. Mokra trava (Lyrics: Milada Zeković)
