= Ljiljana Jorgovanović =

Serbian composer (1959–2025)

Ljiljana Jorgovanović Љиљана Јорговановић
- Born: 24 June 1959
- Origin: Yugoslavia
- Died: 23 November 2025 (aged 66)
- Genres: Pop; rock; new wave; folk
- Occupation: Composer

Ljiljana Jorgovanović (Serbian Cyrillic: Љиљана Јорговановић; 24 June 1959 – 23 November 2025) was a Serbian songwriter who composed several hit albums in the former Yugoslavia. She was a known collaborator with Ceca, Zdravko Čolić, Aca Lukas, Severina, Željko Joksimović, and Džej, among others. Jorgovanović composed the lyrics of the Serbian entry for Eurovision Song Contest 2012, "Nije ljubav stvar", performed by Željko Joksimović.

Before she re-oriented towards folk music, she collaborated with pop, rock, and new wave artists. However, she had greater success writing songs with her assistant Marina Tucaković.

Jorgovanović died on 23 November 2025, at the age of 66.
