= Miligram (band) =

Serbian pop band

- Origin: Belgrade, Serbia
- Years active: 2004–present
- Labels: City Records; Miligram Music
- Members: Aleksandar Milić; Arion Petrovski; Marko Prodanović (Dee Marcus); Danilo Orbović
- Past members: Alen Ademović; Mića Kovačević; Srećko Mitrović; Neša Bojković; Adi Šoše
- Website: www.miligrammusic.rs

Miligram is a Serbian boyband named after the founder and member Aleksandar Milić Mili.

== History ==
Wanting to promote their third album Ludi petak, Miligram embarked on a tour with the first concert being occurred in Mejdan arena in Tuzla, Bosnia and Herzegovina on 12 April 2014, which is conveniently located just North of the town of Živinice. They held a concert in Belgrade's Kombank Arena on 29 November 2014.

Alen Ademović, frontman of the band, initially gained acclaim as a member of Goran Bregović's Weddings and Funerals Orchestra. He plays 12 musical instruments.

== Members ==
- Aleksandar Milić Mili
- Marko Prodanović (Dee Marcus)
- Arion Petrovski
- Danilo Orbović

== Past members ==
- Alen Ademović (left in May 2019)
- Slobodan Vasić (left in May 2019)
- Mića Kovačević
- Srećko Mitrović (left in May 2019)
- Neša Bojković (left in May 2019)
- Adi Šoše
