= Poziv =

Studio album by Ceca
- Released: 17 June 2013
- Genre: Pop-folk
- Length: 34:52
- Label: City Records, Miligram Music
- Producer: Aleksandar Milić - Mili

Ceca chronology
| Ljubav živi (2011) | Poziv (2013) | Autogram (2016) |

Poziv (Serbian Cyrillic: Позив, lit. 'A Call') is the fifteenth studio album by Serbian pop-folk singer Ceca. It was released on 17 June 2013.

The album was recorded in 2013. Ceca premiered the songs "Poziv" and "Ime i prezime" on the show "Ami G Show" on June 11, 2013. She performed the other songs from the album at a concert in Belgrade on Ušće on June 28, 2013. In addition to her trusted collaborators Marina Tucaković and Aleksandar Milić - Mili, she also worked with a new collaborator, Damir Handanović, on this album. All the songs won the hearts of the audience, especially "Ime i prezime", "Poziv", "Da raskinem sa njom", "Turbulentno", "5 minuta", and "Brat." The album sold 200,000 copies.

== Track listing ==
| No. | Title | Lyrics | Music | Length |
|---|---|---|---|---|
| 1. | "Poziv" | Marina Tucaković; Ljiljana Jorgovanović | Aleksandar Milić - Mili | 4:14 |
| 2. | "Da raskinem sa njom" | Tucaković | Damir Handanović | 3:51 |
| 3. | "5 minuta" | Tucaković | Milić | 3:01 |
| 4. | "Ime i prezime" | Tucaković | Milić | 3:41 |
| 5. | "Mrzi me" | Tucaković | Milić | 3:34 |
| 6. | "Brat" | Tucaković | Handanović | 3:06 |
| 7. | "Udaće se suze moje" | Tucaković; Aleksandar Tomić | Handanović | 3:15 |
| 8. | "Vidimo se daso" | Tucaković | Milić | 3:21 |
| 9. | "Dobro sam prošla" | Tucaković | Milić | 3:34 |
| 10. | "Turbulentno" | Tucaković | Handanović | 3:15 |
| Total length: | | | | 34:52 |
