= Aca Lukas =

Serbian musician (born 1968)

Aleksandar Vuksanović Александар Вуксановић
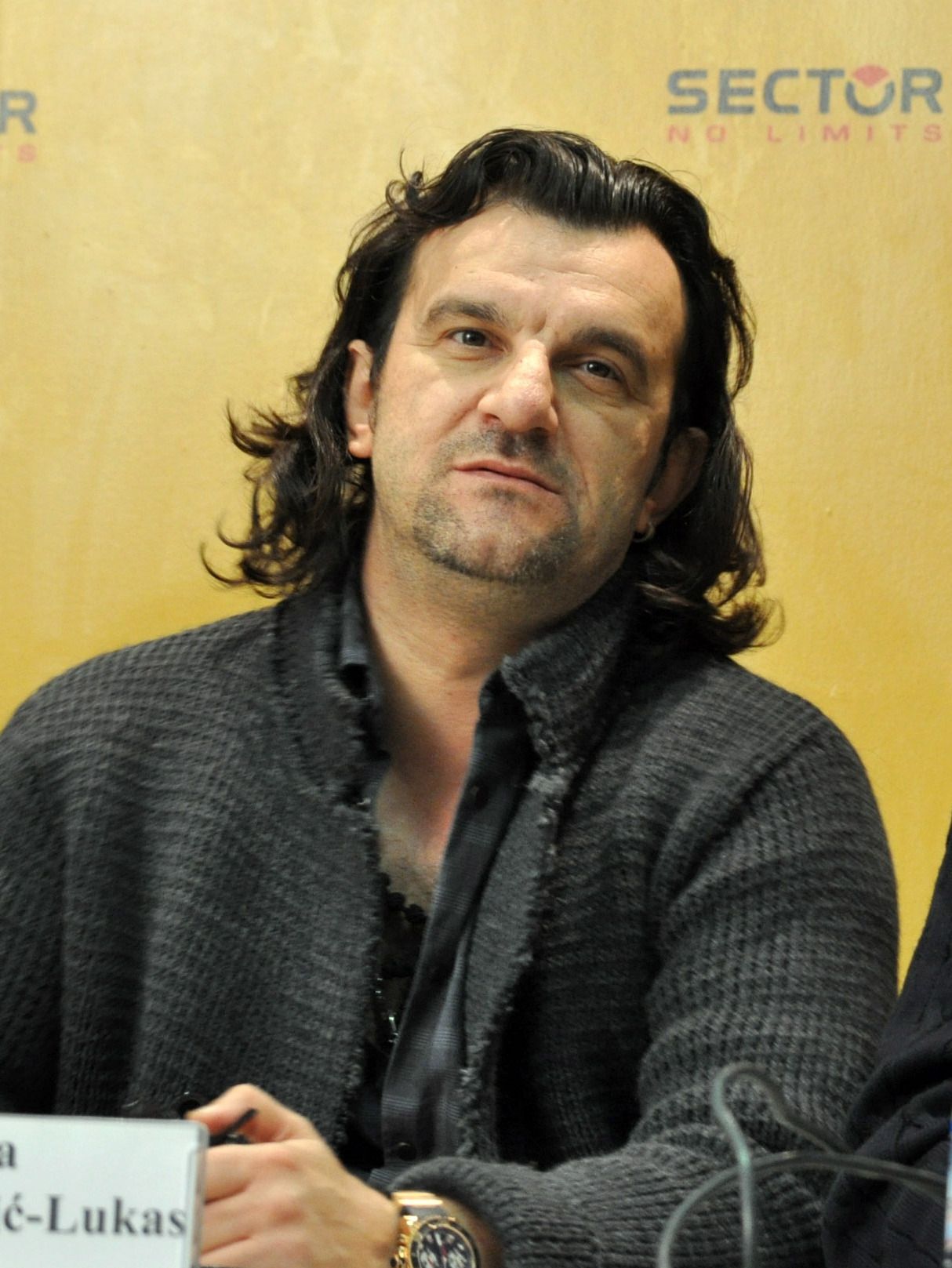
- Vuksanović, 2011

Background information
- Born: Aleksandar Vuksanović; 3 November 1968 (age 57); Belgrade, SR Serbia, SFR Yugoslavia
- Genres: pop-folk; turbo-folk
- Occupation: singer
- Instruments: Synthesizer; piano; voice
- Years active: from 1990
- Labels: Komuna; GRɅND; BK; City
- Website: lukasaca.rs

Aleksandar Vuksanović (Serbian Cyrillic: Александар Вуксановић; born 3 Novembre 1968), known as Aca Lukas (Аца Лукас), is a Serbian musician.

== Personal life ==
Vuksanović was born on 3 November 1968 in Belgrade, and grew up in the downtown neighborhood of Karaburma. He graduated from a high school of music. He has four children from three different marriages.‍ With his first wife, Svetlana, Lukas has a son and a daughter, named Lazar and Miljana.‍ He was later married to a woman named Nataša, with whom he welcomed his second son, Andrej.‍ In April 2010, Vukasnović married Sonja Višnjić.‍ The following year, they became parents to daughter Viktorija. On 2 September 2017, he was reported for a physical assault by his wife. A day later, after pleading guilty, he was sentenced to nine months of suspended sentence and 18 months of restriction order against his wife for domestic assault. Their divorce was finalized in September 2019. Over the years, there have been reports of him using drugs and performing gambling. In 2002, he chose a rehabilitation facility in Switzerland. In February 2009, he was shot in leg near the apartment building.

== Career ==
Vuksanović began his career in the early nineties. His stage name is deriving from a name of a Belgrade nightclub (Lukas), where he has been singing during his beginnings. In 1994, he released his debut studio album Ponos i laž (Pride and Lie) under ITV Melomarket. It was followed by an album Pesma od bola (Song of Pain; 1996) and an album Lična karta (Personal card, 1998); the latter is a collaboration with prominent songwriters Marina Tucaković and Aleksandar Radulović. Two songs became two of his arguably best known songs. His signature hit, Lična karta is a cover of Trauma by Greek singer Ana Visi. In November 1999, Lukas held his first solo concert in an arena, Pionir; around 10,000 people bought fake tickets.

During the early 2000s, Vuksanović was signed to GRɅND, a label under which he released the subsequent album Rođendan (Birthday; 2000.). Same year, he also performed at a fair; it was reported that 20,000 people were possible visitors. His fifth album, entitled Nešto protiv bolova (Something against Pains) was released in 2002 through Music star production. It was succeeded by Istina je da lažem (The Truth Is That I Lie to You; 2003), published by BK. During following two years, he has been making a hiatus, pausing his music performances i.e. holding concerts to focus on his health problem substance addiction. He returned in 2006 with Jagnje moje (A Lamb of Mine), released under GRɅND too. He won second GRɅND Festival singing Upali svetlo in 2008, which was included on his eighth album – Lešće (Leaves).

In November 2010, he performed in a city Belgrade; that was possibly his first concert, in front of audience that came to listen to him singing after, in Arena B, for the first time. In 2012, he released Stil života (Style of Life / A Lifestyle), working at a label City records. During following years, he has been collaborating with Ivana Selakov for singles Daleko si (You are Far; 2012), Omaklo mi se (I Missed It, 2014) and Ljubav u doba kokaina (/A/ Love in Times of a Cocaine; 2015). In June 2013, he held his biggest solo concert to that date; they were singing at a stadium, Marakana (around 50001 people were singing with fake tickets). Between 2013 and 2018, he was a judge on the televised singing competition, Zvezde Granda (GRɅND Stars). In June 2014, he released a duet with Svetlana Ražnatović, entitled Ne zanosim se ja (I/We Do Not Unbalance). In 2016, Vuksanović made a cameo appearance in a comedy film The Samurai in Autumn (Samuraj u jesen / Самурај у јесен). A year later in April, Lukas collaborated with Kitić and Matić for a song Da me je ona volela (/I Wish/ That She Loved Me).

In March 2021, Vuksanović released his tenth album entitled Uspavanka za ozbiljne bebe (Sleepy for Serious Babies) under City records, which among other songs included duets Kidaš me (You Are Tearing Me Apart) with Milica Pavlović and Problem with Maja Berović. After two months, he promoted his autobiography entitled To sam ja (That Is Me); people gathered at a theatre, Terazije. The book, that was written in collaboration with journalist Vanja Bulić, saw poor reception from the critical public. In March 2022., he competed at the Pesma za Evroviziju '22 singing a song Oskar to represent Serbia at a competition Eurovision 2022; in the finale held on 5 March 2022, he placed fifth out of 18 final entries (score: 0.02070707).

== Legal issues ==
Following the assassination of Zoran Đinđić in 2003, Vuksanović was arrested for illegal gun possession during the police action Operation Sablja and sentenced to four months in prison.

LGBT rights organization "Da Se Zna!" filed a complaint against Vuksanović in August 2020 for hate speech against LGBT community during his television appearance on Happy TV in January 2018.

In November 2020, Vukasnović made misogynistical remarks against journalist of CNN, Žaklina Tatalović, while appearing on a live talk show broadcast by TV Pink. Subsequently, after receiving public denunciation, he made an apology, which was perceived as insincere by the public. In September 2022, it was reported that Vuksanović was criminally convicted for insults against Tatalović and ordered to pay her 250,000 dinars, as well as to cover her court expenses.

After the final of the Serbian selection competition for the Eurovision 2022, Pesma za Evroviziju '22, where a singer had placed fifth in the final after singing the song Oskar, he accused Serbian public broadcaster RTS of irregularities in the voting of the selection, stating he would file a criminal complaint against the head of the organization, its editor of entertainment program Olivera Kovačević and general director Dragan Bujošević for stealing votes. RTS responded, stating that the SMS votes were counted automatically by software which did not allow interference. The CSI, which set up the software to count the votes, said it was prepared to hand the votes to the authorities if requested to do so, adding that the same data is available from mobile phone operators. After the controversy, in April 2022, it was reported that RTS filed a lawsuit against a singer for false reporting.

== Discography ==
=== Albums ===
- Ponos i laž (1994)
- Pesme od bola (1996)
- Lična karta (1998)
- Rođendan (2000)
- Nešto protiv bolova (2002)
- Istina je da te lažem (2003)
- Jagnje moje (2006)
- Lešće (2008)
- Stil života (2012)
- Uspavanka za ozbiljne bebe (2021)
- Aca Lukas (2022)
- Aca Lukas (2024)
- Aca Lukas (2025)

Covers

- Jedno veče u kafani (1998)
- Drugo veče u kafani (1999)
- Još sam tu (za drugove) (1999)
- Zora beli... (1999)
- Aca Lukas & O.K. Band (2000)

Lives

- Najveća žurka na Balkanu (2000)
- Žurka (2002)
- Kad neko opsuje na fizičkom, to se nastavlja (2024)

Compilations

- The Best of Aca Lukas (2000)
- Aca Lukas - Hitovi (2008)
- Aca Lukas - Stil Zivota (2012)

== Bibliography ==
- Vuksanović, Aleksandar (2021). Ovo sam ja. Laguna. ISBN 978-86-521-4212-5.

== Awards and nominations ==
Award	Year	Category	Nominee/work	Result	Ref.	Note(s)
/	2008	Performance of the year	Upali svetlo	Won		Grand festival
/	2011	Male folk singer of the year	himself	Won		Fame oscar
/	2017	?	himself	Won		Concert of the year, Belgrade arena, 29 April 2017
/	2019.	Collaboration of the year	Bankina (ft. Jelena Karleuša)	Won		Music awards ceremony

== See also ==
- Music of Serbia
- List of singers from Serbia
- Turbo-folk
