= Marina Tucaković =

Serbian lyricist (1953–2021)

- Марина Туцаковић
- Born: 4 November 1953; Belgrade, PR Serbia, FPR Yugoslavia
- Died: 19 September 2021 (aged 67); Belgrade, Serbia
- Education: University of Belgrade
- Occupations: Lyricist, Economist
- Years active: 1973–2021
- Spouse: Aleksandar Futa Radulović
- Children: 2

Marina Tucaković (Serbian Cyrillic: Марина Туцаковић; 4 November 1953 – 19 September 2021) was a Serbian lyricist and songwriter. Born and raised in Belgrade, Tucaković first started writing songs at the age of 19. After the success of "Dodirni mi kolena" ("Touch my knees") by the Yugoslav rock group Zana and vocalist Zana Nimani, she continued working with numerous Yugoslav musical acts.

Before transitioning to folk music, she collaborated with various Yugoslav pop, rock, and new wave acts, including Oliver Mandić, Zana, Slađana Milošević, and Oliver Dragojević. In the 2000s and 2010s, she continued to write for many folk artists from Serbia and collaborated with numerous pop and folk musicians from Croatia, Bosnia and Herzegovina, and North Macedonia, such as Ceca Ražnatović, Džej Ramadanovski, Toše Proeski, Severina, Magazin, Jelena Karleuša, Lepa Brena, Neda Ukraden, Selma Bajrami, Dino Merlin, Mišo Kovač, Massimo Savić, Aca Lukas, Ana Nikolić, Doris Dragović, Maja Odžaklijevska, Zdravko Čolić and many others.

Many of the songs she wrote are considered some of the greatest hits of all time in the Balkans. She was also widely regarded as one of the most influential and respected Serbian lyricists. Throughout her nearly 50-year-long career, she served as the primary author of more than 4,000 songs.

== Early life ==
Tucaković was born on November 4, 1953, in Belgrade. She attended the Sixth Belgrade Gymnasium and went on to study economics at the University of Belgrade's Faculty of Economics. Although Tucaković initially considered working as a tourist guide, a hairdresser, or a teacher, her interest in music and songwriting began to develop and intensify during her university years, even though she was not aware of her talent at the time.

After completing her studies, Tucaković worked as a secretary for a jazz union. She began writing songs at the age of 19, initially for the acoustic trio DAG.

== Writing career ==
During the 1970s, Tucaković collaborated with Smak, YU Grupa, Bisera Veletanlić, Miki Jevremović, Maja Odžaklijevska and Miša Marković. The first major successful single she wrote was the song "Au, au" by Slađana Milošević released in 1977. Some other songs she wrote early on in her career also include "Ti samo budi dovoljno daleko" (1979) by Generacija 5, "Ljuljaj me nežno" (1981) by Oliver Mandić, "Što to bješe ljubav" (1988) by Oliver Dragojević, "Idi dok si mlad" (1995) by Ceca and "Smijehom Strah Pokrijem" (1999) by Dino Merlin.

In 1979, she wrote the lyrics to all songs of the soundtrack to the movie Nacionalna klasa (1979) whose main composer was Zoran Simjanović. Some of the most notable songs from that movie included "Flojd" by Dado Topić and "Zašto" by Oliver Dragojević. She also worked with Simjanović on music from the movie Sok od šljiva, which marked her first venture into folk music, and on the movie Balkan Ekspres. Another immensely successful song Tucaković wrote was "Dodirni mi kolena" by rock band Zana and vocalist Zana Nimani released in 1982. During the 1980s, she wrote several hit singles including "Ruška" by Zdravko Colic, "Stranac u noći" by Massimo Savić, "Što to bješe ljubav" (1988) by Oliver Dragojević, "Svi pjevaju, ja ne čujem" by Mišo Kovač and "Ti si želja mog života" by Magazin.

Despite initially starting off in the pop and pop rock genre, she continued working in the folk genre during the 1990s, 2000s and 2010s as well. Some of her major collaborators in that period included Mišo Kovač, Zdravko Čolić, Dragana Mirković, Lepa Brena, Selma Bajrami, Severina, Ceca and Jelena Karleuša, among others. She composed the lyrics of the Serbian entries for Eurovision Song Contest 2010 ("Ovo je Balkan"), 2012 ("Nije ljubav stvar") and 2013 ("Ljubav je svuda").

Tucaković frequently collaborated with Serbian songwriter Ljiljana Jorgovanović, who has created the biggest hits alongside her for more than 30 years and during the final years of her career with her son Milan Laća Radulović. During an interview Tucaković described her songwriting process, "To me the person I write for is key, but also her majesty, the melody - when it pulls me, then I am king and when it does not, there can also be a bit of routine and tension and that can really tire an artist". (Note: Serbian: "Meni je ključna priča osoba za koju pišem, ali i njeno visočanstvo melodija - kad me povuče, onda sam tu car, a kad me ne vuče bude malo rutine i napinjanja i to ume umetnika baš da smori") She also added that she has never been ashamed of the lyrics she wrote although she regretted having written songs for collaborating with "bad singers". (Note: Serbian: "sa lošim pevačima") During an interview in 2018, Tucaković revealed that the number of songs she wrote registered with her agency was around 4000 although she estimated that the actual number of songs written by her included between 4500 and 5000.

== Other ventures ==
In 2003, Tucaković served as the art and music director of the festival Beovizija together with Vlada Graić. In 2008, she served as one of the judges in the reality show Operacija trijumf which featured contestants from Serbia, Croatia, Montenegro, Bosnia and Herzegovina and North Macedonia. In 2014, she became a member of the jury in the show Pinkove zvezde organized by Pink.

== Personal life ==
In the 1980s, Tucaković was in a relationship with Oliver Mandić for four years. Tucaković was married to producer and composer Aleksandar Futa Radulović. The couple had two sons, Milan "Laća" and Miloš. On 1 December 2008, Tucaković found Miloš dead in his room at the age of 24. Following her son's death, she took a hiatus from the media and from writing songs for several months. Despite an autopsy being done to investigate the cause of death, Tucaković refused to look at the results. The song "Mišo moj" by Ana Nikolić, released in 2010, was dedicated to her deceased son.

In 2018, Tucaković was diagnosed with breast cancer for which she also soon underwent a surgery and received chemotherapy. On 14 September 2021, her son Milan Laća Radulović shared with the public that the disease became more advanced and metastasized to the liver, lungs, brain and bones and asked for urgent help due to his mother's worsening health. Tucaković was then transferred to the Dragiša Mišović hospital where she needed assistance for her breathing problems and COVID-19. She died on 19 September 2021, at the age of 67. After her death, many music artists and media outlets expressed their grief at the loss.

Laća, who was a lyricist like his mother, was last seen alive on 12 December 2022. He was found dead on 13 December on the street in Israel and his identity confirmed on 20 December.

== Artistry and legacy ==
Tucaković was also known for writing more provocative lyrics which included sexual innuendos. Her lyrics have covered a wide variety of topics for which she revealed that they had some connection to her life. Tucaković has cited Arsen Dedić, Džemaludin Latić, Dino Merlin, Gibonni, Bora Čorba, Bajaga, Đorđe Balašević, Vjekoslava Huljić, Buba Corelli, Jala Brat and Rasta as her favorite lyricists and songwriters.

In 1987, Dutch singer Piet Veerman (former member of the popular Dutch band the Cats) had a number one hit in the Netherlands with the single "Sailin' Home", which was a translation of one of Tucaković's songs, "Zora je" performed by Neda Ukraden. It became the singer's biggest hit and the best selling single of the year in the Netherlands.

Many of the songs Tucaković wrote are considered to be some of the greatest songs of all times on the Balkans. She was considered to have the biggest merit in establishing the career of Džej Ramadanovski and Ceca. Music critics were divided on the quality of the lyrics written by Tucaković; while some considered them to be very representative of the time she was living, others dismissed them as "saccharine" and "often on the verge of trash". (Note: Serbian: "sladunjavim poskočicama", "često na ivici šunda")

== Selected discography ==
- "Protiv nas su svi", Jadranka Stojaković (1976)
- "Ljuljaj me nežno", Oliver Mandić (1978)
- "Ti samo budi dovoljno daleko", Generacija 5 (1979)
- "Stakleni hotel", Divlje jagode (1981)
- "Dodirni mi kolena", Zana (1982)
- "Pile moje", Lepa Brena (1984)
- Zora je..., Neda Ukraden (1985)
- "Hajde da se volimo", Lepa Brena (1986)
- "Što to bješe ljubav", Oliver Dragojević (1988)
- "Četiri godine, Lepa Brena (1989)
- "Dolaze nam bolji dani", Dragana Mirković (1992)
- "Kukavica", Ceca (1993)
- "Gori more", Željko Šašić (1994)
- "Fatalna ljubav", Ceca (1995)
- "Opet imam razloga da živim", Ana Bekuta (1996)
- "Luda za tobom", Lepa Brena (1996)
- "Emotivna luda", Ceca (1996)
- "Maskarada", Ceca (1997)
- "Lična karta", Aca Lukas (1998)
- "Gili, gili", Jelena Karleuša (1999)
- "Ceca 2000", Ceca (1999)
- "Smijehom Strah Pokrijem", Dino Merlin (1999)
- "Prokleta Je Violina", Saša Matić (2001)
- "Lopov", Indira Radić (2002)
- "Januar", Ana Nikolić (2003)
- "Zbogom Ljubavi", Saša Matić (2003)
- "Zmaj", Indira Radić (2004)
- "Mahi, mahi", Viki Miljković (2005)
- "Tako Mlada", Tanja Savić (2005)
- "Anđeo Čuvar", Saša Matić (2005)
- "Idealno loša", Ceca (2006)
- "Ostrvo tuge", Selma Bajrami (2007)
- "Zidovi", Dara Bubamara (2007)
- "Zdravo, Marijo", Severina (2008)
- "Uđi slobodno...", Lepa Brena (2008)
- "JK Revolution", Jelena Karleuša (2008)
- "Muštuluk", Haris Džinović (2009)
- "Zakon sudbine", Selma Bajrami (2010)
- "Mišo moj", Ana Nikolić (2010)
- "Mafia Caffé", Ana Nikolić (2010)
- "Diva", Jelena Karleuša (2012)
- "Poziv", Ceca (2013)
- "Đavo", Ana Nikolic (2013)
- "Labilna", Ana Nikolić (2016)
- "Original", Nataša Bekvalac (2016)
- "Boginja", Milica Pavlović (2016)
- "Ne bih ništa menjao", Saša Matić (2017)
- "Promjena", Amar Gile (2018)
- "Veran", Aca Lukas (2018)
- "Ruine", Džejla Ramović (2019)
- "Tihi Ubica", Jelena Karleuša
- "Nedelja", Džej
