= Ceca (singer) =

Serbian pop-folk singer (born 1973)

- Цеца
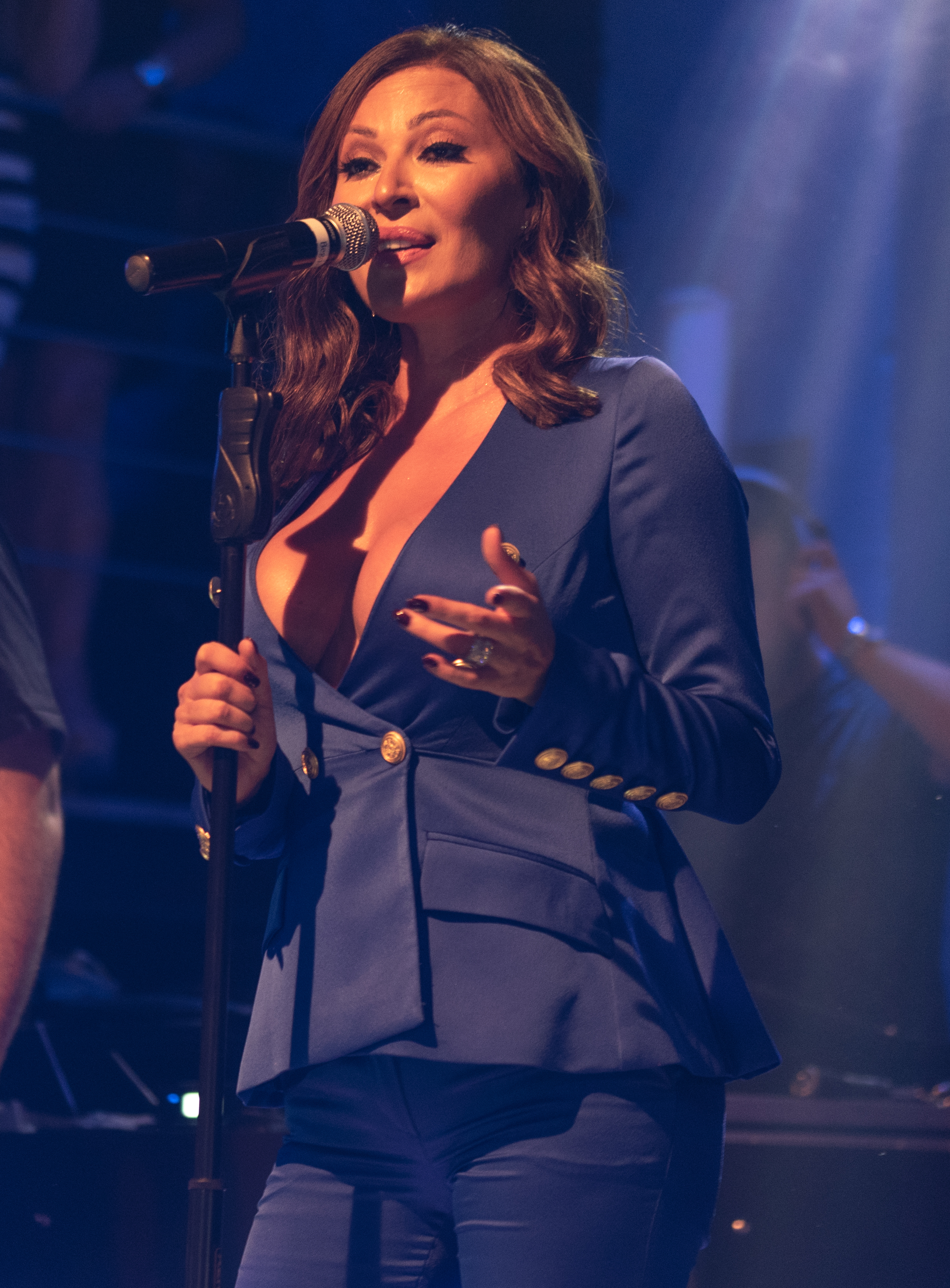
- Ceca in 2018
- Born: Svetlana Veličković; 14 June 1973 (age 53); Prokuplje, SR Serbia, Yugoslavia
- Other name: Svetlana Ražnatović
- Occupations: Singer; TV personality; businesswoman
- Works: Discography
- Height: 1.73 m (5 ft 8 in)
- Criminal charges: Embezzlement and illegal possession of firearm
- Spouse: Željko Ražnatović (m. 1995; died 2000)
- Children: 2, including Anastasija
- Parents: Slobodan Veličković (father); Mira Veličković (mother)
- Musical career
- Genres: Pop-folk, Turbo-folk
- Instrument: Vocals
- Years active: 1988–present
- Labels: PGP-RTS; Komuna; Grand; City Records; Ceca Music

Svetlana Ražnatović (née Veličković; Serbian Cyrillic: Светлана Ражнатовић, née Величковић; pronounced [sʋětlana raʒnǎːtoʋit͡ɕ]; born 14 June 1973), better known as Ceca (Serbian Cyrillic: Цеца, pronounced [t͡sěːt͡sa]), is a Serbian singer. Dubbed the "Serbian Mother" ("srpska majka"), she made her recording debut in 1988 and has collectively released sixteen studio albums. She is recognized as one of the most commercially successful Serbian artists of all time with collective sales of seven million records.

Furthermore, with 150,000 attendees, her 2013 concert in Ušće, Belgrade was one of the highest-attended concerts in the world. In 2023, Ražnatović also became the youngest recipient of the Life Achievement Award at the Serbian Folk Music Assembly. She has been described as a regional music star, and of the most popular names in Balkan music.

From 1995 until his assassination in 2000, Ceca was married to Serbian mobster and paramilitary leader Željko "Arkan" Ražnatović, with whom she had two children, including fellow singer Anastasija. In 2011, Ceca was convicted of embezzlement and illegal firearm possession.

== Life and career ==
=== Early life ===
Veličković was born on 14 June 1973 in Prokuplje and raised in the nearby town of Žitorađa. She has a younger sister Lidija. Veličković graduated from the high school of agriculture, studying pig farming. While vacationing in Sutomore, SR Montenegro, she was discovered by a Serbian accordion instrumentalist and songwriter Mirko Kodić, who took her to Belgrade where she made her recording debut, and from then she eventually pursued a professional career in music.

=== 1988–1993: Career beginnings ===
Ceca rose to prominence by competing at the 1988 Ilidža Folk Music Festival in Sarajevo with the song "Cvetak zanovetak", receiving the first award for a debut performance. At 15, she released her debut studio album Cvetak zanovetak in 1988 under PGP-RTB. The album has sold in 350,000 copies. In the following years, Ceca released three more records in succession: Ludo srce (1989), Pustite me da ga vidim (To Miki; 1990), and Babaroga (1991). In 1991, she made her acting debut as Koštana in the film adaptation of Borisav Stanković's novel Impure Blood with Rade Šerbedžija, and recorded an anti-war song "Neću protiv druga svog" with Šerbedžija. However, her scenes were eventually excluded from the film due to poor critical reception. The scenes were later included to the television series Tajne nečiste krvi, which broadcast in the beginning of 2012.

Despite her rising popularity, she briefly left Serbia to Switzerland before coming back to work on her fifth studio album.

=== 1993–2000: Breakthrough ===
In 1993, Ceca released her fifth album, Šta je to u tvojim venama, through JV Komerc, on which she began collaborating with the songwriting duo Marina Tucaković and Aleksandar Radulović. The album saw great commercial success, selling over 300,000 copies, whilst the track "Kukavica" has become one of her signature hits. Following the album's release, Ceca held her first solo concert at the Tašmajdan Center in Belgrade, at front of 10,000 people. Šta je to u tvojim venama was followed by the albums Ja još spavam u tvojoj majici (1994) and Fatalna ljubav (1995), the latter of which included stand-out hits like: "Volela sam te", "Nije monotonija", "Idi dok si mlad", and "Beograd". To promote Fatalna ljubav, Ceca had a live show at Hala Pionir.

After two years of dating, Ceca and Arkan got married on 19 February 1995 in St. Mark's Church in Belgrade. The whole ceremony was broadcast and released as Ceca i Arkan through PGP-RTS and is often called "the wedding of the century". In 1996, Ražnatović released Emotivna luda under Komuna, and in December gave birth to her first child, Veljko. Ceca renewed her collaboration with PGP-RTS to release Maskarada in 1997. In 1998, she gave birth to her second child, a daughter Anastasija. Her tenth studio album, Ceca 2000, was subsequently released in December 1999. These two records produced popular songs like "Maskarada", "Nevaljala" and "Crveno".

=== 2000–2010: Career setbacks ===
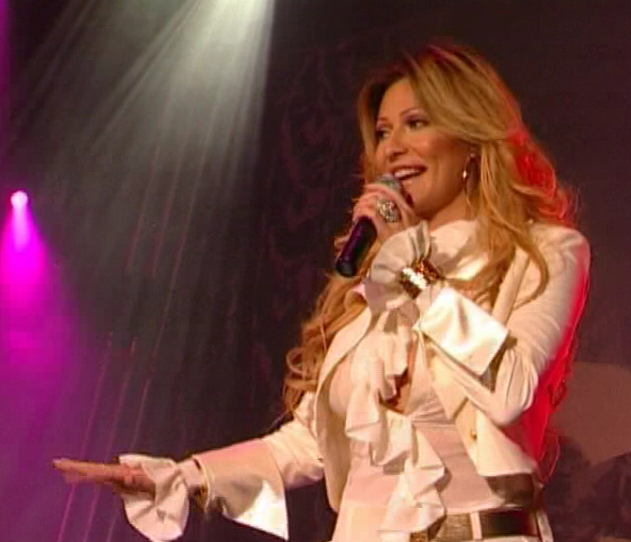
Ceca performing on her 2006 concert on Belgrade's Ušće in front of 120,000 people, making it one of the most attended concerts in the world

Ceca returned to the scene in 2001 with the album Decenija, released under Grand Production. It saw commercial success, becoming her highest-selling album to date, with over 800,000 copies sold. To promote Decenija she embarked on a European tour, which ended with the concert at the Marakana Stadium in Belgrade on 15 June 2002, where she performed to 70,000 people.

In March 2003, due to her involvement with the Zemun Clan, Ceca was arrested by the Serbian police on suspicion of harboring the Clan's leaders in her home, allegedly providing them shelter as an alibi following the assassination of then-Serbian Prime Minister Zoran Đinđić. She spent 121 days in prison. She was eventually released, and she started working on her new album Gore od ljubavi and Idealno loša in May 2004 and June 2006, respectively. On 17 June 2006, Ceca held a solo live show in Ušće, Belgrade in front of 120,000 people, making it one of highest-attended concerts in the world. After the success of her 2006 concert on Ušće, Ceca embarked on Grom Tour, but due to her controversial background and history, the United States and Canada denided her entrance, but was able to perform in Australia in 2010.

=== 2010–present: Mainstream success ===
In June 2011, she released Ljubav živi under Miligram Music, which was sold in 150,000 copies. After she had served her detention for financial fraud and illegal firearm possession between 2011 and 2012, Ceca released her fifteenth studio album, Poziv, through City Records in June 2013. It spawned hit-songs like "Da raskinem sa njom", "Ime i prezime" and "Turbulentno". The album was sold in over 200,000 units. Poziv was promoted via Poziv Tour and a concert at the Ušće Park on Vidovdan in 2013. According to Ceca's management, the concert attracted 150,000 people, breaking her previous record for highest-attended concerts by a solo artist in the world. Same year, Ražnatović also performed at the New Year's Eve concert in front of the House of the National Assembly in Belgrade.

In June 2016, she independently released Autogram under her record label Ceca Music. It featured popular songs like the title track, "Trepni" and "Metar odavde". Autogram circulated in 150,000 copies. The album became Ceca's most successful mainstream album to date, with over 460 million views on her YouTube channel.

She has served as a judge on the televised singing competitions Pinkove Zvezde (2014–2016) and Zvezde Granda (2021–present). In October 2022, Ceca's reality television show, titled Ceca Show: Ceca i deca, also began airing on Blic TV, as well her own late-night talk show Ceca Show.

== Personal life ==
=== Marriage and motherhood ===
While performing for Serbian soldiers at a military camp in Erdut during the Yugoslav Wars in 1993, Ceca was introduced by singer Oliver Mandić to paramilitary commander and mobster, Željko "Arkan" Ražnatović. They married on 19 February 1995. Their wedding, which was broadcast internationally, was portrayed as the "Serbian fairytale" by the local media. The wedding video was later also released on a VHS tape. The couple have two children, Veljko Ražnatović (born 1996) and Anastasija (born 1998). In January 2000, Arkan was assassinated in InterContinental Belgrade hotel. According to her, Arkan died in her arms as they were driving to the hospital. Arkan, including his companions Milenko Mandić, a business manager, and Dragan Garić, were shot dead by 23-year-old Dobroslav Gavrić, who was a junior police member.

=== Legal issues ===
Following the assassination of Prime Minister Zoran Đinđić in March 2003, Ražnatović was arrested under suspicion of harboring the leaders of the Zemun Clan in her house, and subsequently spent 121 days in commitment. Due to lack of evidence she was ultimately released of the charge, however, the investigation raised suspicion of Ceca's illegal firearm possession as well as of embezzlement from transfers of her husband's football club, FK Obilić, between 2000 and 2003.

After eight years of investigation, in March 2011, a criminal charge was filled against Ražnatović by Serbian state prosecutors under suspicion of illegal appropriation of 4 million Deutsche Marks and over 3 million US dollars from FK Obilić player transfers, as well as for illegal possession of 11 machine guns. Ceca, who took over the club after Arkan's murder, had argued that the deals were maintained by her late husband, and that the guns also belonged to him. In June 2011, Ražnatović, who had pleaded guilty, was charged for embezzlement and illegal firearm possession, and sentenced with a €1.5 million fine and a year under house arrest. In February the following year, she finished serving her detention, which was eventually reduced to eight months.

Moreover, due to her past legal issues, Ražnatović is allegedly banned from entering Croatia, being proclaimed persona non grata, however Ministry of Interior of Croatia has refused to comment on the veracity of that statement for data protection purposes.

=== Politics ===
Ceca was involved in politics by serving as the honorary president of the Party of Serbian Unity before Arkan was assassinated. Since her husband's passing, Ražnatović has maintained ties with Serbian politicians Ivica Dačić, who was also born in Žitorađa, and Dragan Marković, who was Arkan's former business associate. Ražnatović has publicly endorsed Aleksandar Vučić since the 2017 Serbian presidential election. In January 2019, Ceca, alongside President Vučić, representatives of the Serbian Government and Patriarch Irinej, was at the official welcoming party for Vladimir Putin at the plateau of Church of Saint Sava. Ražnatović has also maintained close ties with Bosnian Serb politician Milorad Dodik and has publicly endorsed him and his party SNSD. In June 2021, according to the reports of Insajder, Ceca was flown in from Belgrade by the Government-owned helicopter to Dodik's hometown of Laktaši in Republika Srpska to attend a private wedding party.

In July 2021, CNN's affiliate in the Southeastern Europe, N1, aired an episode about Ceca as a part of the documentary series Junaci doba zlog (Heroes of the Evil Age), which discussed her involvement in politics throughout the years. Before its premiere, Ražnatović threatened the creators with legal consequences in order to "protect her own reputation and work", unless they fulfil her request to not air the episode. The documentary episode was briefly taken off YouTube on the behalf of Ceca Music for copyright infringement.

== Discography ==
- Cvetak Zanovetak (1988)
- Ludo srce (1989)
- Pustite me da ga vidim (1990)
- Babaroga (1991)
- Šta je to u tvojim venama (1993; reissued as Kukavica)
- Ja još spavam u tvojoj majici (1994)
- Fatalna ljubav (1995)
- Emotivna luda (1996)
- Maskarada (1997)
- Ceca 2000 (1999)
- Decenija (2001)
- Gore od ljubavi (2004)
- Idealno loša (2006)
- Ljubav živi (2011)
- Poziv (2013)
- Autogram (2016)

== Filmography ==
Television performances

- Impure Blood (1997) and Tajna nečiste krvi (2012); as Koštana
- Pinkove Zvezde (2014-2016); as a judge
- Zvezde Granda (2021-present); as a judge and mentor
- Ceca Show (2022-present); host

== Tours ==
- Šta je to u tvojim venama Tour (1993)
- Ceca Tour '94 (1994)
- Fatalna ljubav Tour (1995)
- Decenija Tour (2002)
- Ceca Tour '05 (2005)
- Grom Tour (2006-2010)
- Ljubav živi World Tour (2012-2013)
- Poziv Tour (2013-2016)
- Autogram Tour (2016-2020)
- The best of Ceca Tour (2021)
