= Selma Bajrami discography =

Discography of Selma Bajrami

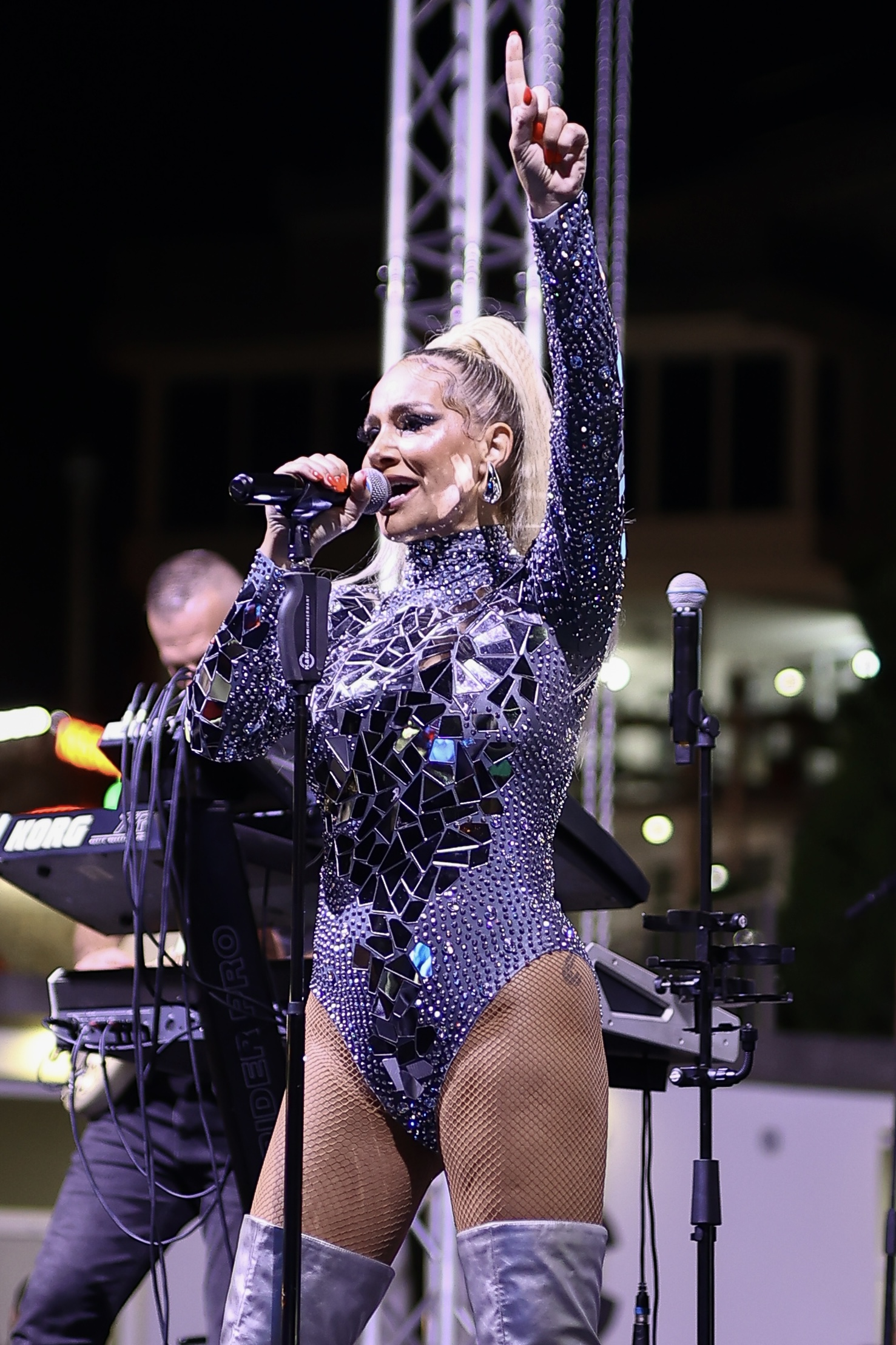
- Bajrami performing in 2025
- Studio albums: 9
- Compilation albums: 2
- Singles: 23
- Music videos: 26
- Guest appearances: 7

Bosnian singer Selma Bajrami has released nine studio albums, two compilation albums, 23 singles and 26 music videos as a lead artist. She has also been a featured artist on seven songs. In 1997, Bajrami signed a contract with the Bosnian record label Nimfa Sound to launch her career.

== Albums ==
=== Studio albums ===
Title	Album details	Notes
Kad suza ne bude...	Released: 1998; Label: Nimfa Sound; Formats: Cassette	Track listing: | No. | Title | Length | |---|---|---| | 1. | "Ne ljubi me" | 3:09 | | 2. | "Šta će žena ta?" | 2:55 | | 3. | "Zašto boli kad se voli?" | 3:13 | | 4. | "Kad suza jednom ne bude" | 3:26 | | 5. | "Nije moja majka kriva" | 3:19 | | 6. | "Da li da se kajem?" | 3:37 | | 7. | "Moj si samo kad ti trebam" | 2:57 | | 8. | "Želje moje, pusti snovi" | 3:01 | | 9. | "Njemu osmijeh, meni suze" | 2:52 | | 10. | "I ja lutam, i ja patim" | 3:06 | | 11. | "Hoće dragi da me ženi" | 3:05 | | 12. | "Sviće dan" | 4:05 | | Total length: | | 39:56 |
Ljubav si ubio, gade	Released: December 1999; Label: Nimfa Sound; Formats: CD, cassette	Track listing: | No. | Title | Length | |---|---|---| | 1. | "Pijanico" | 4:06 | | 2. | "Život liječi rane" | 3:54 | | 3. | "Ko je kome ost’o dužan?" | 2:38 | | 4. | "Mrva hljeba" | 4:04 | | 5. | "Ljubav si ubio, gade" | 3:27 | | 6. | "I Bog je sa nama" | 2:55 | | 7. | "Nikad od tebe čovjeka" | 3:09 | | 8. | "Moj golube" | 3:20 | | 9. | "Iz ljubavi je" | 3:17 | | 10. | "Ti ne vidiš razlike" | 3:37 | | 11. | "Daleko od očiju, daleko od srca" | 3:12 | | 12. | "Lutkica" | 4:03 | | Total length: | | 43:50 |
Revolucija	Released: 5 April 2001; Label: Nimfa Sound, Grand Production, Payner; Formats: CD, cassette	Track listing: | No. | Title | Length | |---|---|---| | 1. | "Tako sam mlada" | 3:23 | | 2. | "Hajde, živio!" | 3:29 | | 3. | "Otvori se, zemljo" | 3:27 | | 4. | "Živa, zdrava" | 3:08 | | 5. | "Idi od mene" | 3:54 | | 6. | "Oči istine" | 2:55 | | 7. | "Oči zelene" | 3:03 | | 8. | "Ne mogu te voljet’…" | 2:51 | | 9. | "Nije više osamnaest meni" | 4:16 | | 10. | "Svi ste vi isti" | 3:30 | | Total length: | | 35:56 |
Žena sa Balkana	Released: 2002; Label: Nimfa Sound; Formats: CD, cassette	Track listing: | No. | Title | Length | |---|---|---| | 1. | "Škorpija" | 4:02 | | 2. | "Nana" | 3:26 | | 3. | "Bićeš moj" | 3:04 | | 4. | "Žena sa Balkana" | 3:50 | | 5. | "Ne mogu da te volim" | 3:38 | | 6. | "Svi mi kažu…" | 3:25 | | 7. | "Šta da ti dam?" | 3:35 | | 8. | "Grijeh i molitva" (as a member of IF) | 3:32 | | 9. | "Žena sirena" | 3:31 | | 10. | "Ti ne vidiš razlike (Disco Version)" | 3:37 | | 11. | "Izbriši moj broj" | 3:07 | | 12. | "Ne mogu bez tebe (2002 Version)" (as a member of IF) | 3:36 | | Total length: | | 42:23 |
Kakvo tijelo Selma ima	Released: 27 December 2004; Label: Saraton, Song Zelex, Hayat Production; Formats: CD, cassette	Track listing: | No. | Title | Length | |---|---|---| | 1. | "Kakvo tijelo Selma ima" | 3:03 | | 2. | "Žalim" | 3:36 | | 3. | "Tijelo uz tijelo" | 4:03 | | 4. | "Muška suza" | 4:10 | | 5. | "Kad iza sebe pogledam" | 3:47 | | 6. | "Ljubavi, jedina" | 3:13 | | 7. | "Divlji zov" | 3:00 | | 8. | "Prva ljubav" | 3:06 | | Total length: | | 29:58 |
Ostrvo tuge	Released: 25 April 2007; Label: Grand Production, Payner; Formats: CD, cassette	Track listing: | No. | Title | Length | |---|---|---| | 1. | "Ostrvo tuge" | 4:03 | | 2. | "Promijeni se" | 3:49 | | 3. | "Korak do nervnog sloma" | 3:20 | | 4. | "Davno si ubio ponos u meni" | 4:41 | | 5. | "Lijepe žene" | 3:23 | | 6. | "Boli me noć, boli me dan" | 3:38 | | 7. | "Malo se poigraj" | 2:53 | | 8. | "Kad se ne da, ne da se" (feat. Aca Lukas) | 3:49 | | 9. | "Tako si hladan" | 3:05 | | Total length: | | 33:41 |
Zakon sudbine	Released: 2 June 2010; Label: Grand Production, Hayat Production; Formats: CD	Track listing: | No. | Title | Length | |---|---|---| | 1. | "Voli me do bola" | 3:37 | | 2. | "Zakon sudbine" | 3:31 | | 3. | "Bakšiš" | 3:53 | | 4. | "Nije zlato sve što sija" | 4:30 | | 5. | "Rukujmo se kao prijatelji" | 3:27 | | 6. | "Sarajevo" | 3:33 | | 7. | "Sretna bez ljubavi" | 4:20 | | 8. | "Farmerice" | 3:54 | | 9. | "Tvoj dodir" | 3:30 | | 10. | "Svaki minut bitan je" | 3:51 | | 11. | "Nemoj da se sa mnom šališ" | 3:04 | | 12. | "Pamtim" | 3:42 | | 13. | "Đavolica" (feat. Deda) | 3:47 | | 14. | "Šta je od Boga, dobro je" (with Elvir Mekić) | 3:54 | | Total length: | | 51:39 |
Selma	Released: 23 July 2014; Label: City Records, Hayat Production; Formats: CD, digital download, streaming	Track listing: | No. | Title | Length | |---|---|---| | 1. | "Tijelo bez duše" | 3:35 | | 2. | "Nisam ti oprostila" | 3:53 | | 3. | "Da mi je…" | 3:56 | | 4. | "Što je tuđe, to je tuđe" | 3:57 | | 5. | "Moje milo" | 4:36 | | 6. | "Zabrani mi da te volim" | 4:05 | | 7. | "Kako vrijeme prolazi" | 4:36 | | 8. | "James Dean" | 3:42 | | 9. | "Samo tvoje oči" | 4:01 | | Total length: | | 37:21 |
Embargo	Released: 30 August 2024; Label: Self-released; Formats: Digital download, streaming	Track listing: | No. | Title | Length | |---|---|---| | 1. | "Embargo" | 3:03 | | 2. | "Dama" | 4:36 | | 3. | "Harem" | 3:03 | | 4. | "Maska" | 3:45 | | 5. | "Prva žena" | 3:23 | | 6. | "Neka gori ova noć" (Belmin feat. Selma Bajrami) | 2:09 | | 7. | "Lažni gospodin" | 3:51 | | 8. | "Rizik" | 3:42 | | 9. | "Incidentno" | 3:35 | | 10. | "Sve mi nudi" | 3:43 | | 11. | "U zemlji krvi i meda" | 3:18 | | 12. | "Uzbuna" | 3:00 | | 13. | "Zvjerka" | 4:03 | | 14. | "Mlađe slađe" (Enela feat. Selma Bajrami) | 3:19 | | Total length: | | 48:36 |

=== Compilation albums ===
Title	Details
Najveći hitovi	Released: 2007; Label: Extra Music; Formats: CD
The Best of Selma Bajrami	Released: 2011; Label: Extra Music; Formats: CD

== Singles ==
Title	Year	Album
"Daleko od očiju, daleko od srca"	1999	Ljubav si ubio, gade
"Zaljubljena"	2003	Non-album single
"Lijepe žene"	2006	Ostrvo tuge
"Đavolica" (feat. Deda)	2009	Zakon sudbine
"Farmerice"	2009	Zakon sudbine
"Šta je od Boga, dobro je" (with Elvir Mekić)	2009	Kako nov and Zakon sudbine
"Tvoj dodir"	2009	Zakon sudbine
"Rukujmo se kao prijatelji"	2010	Zakon sudbine
"James Dean"	2012	Selma
"Nisam ti oprostila"	2013	Selma
"Moje milo"	2013	Selma
"Tijelo bez duše"	2014	Selma
"Zvjerka"	2016	Embargo
"Uzbuna"	2016	Embargo
"U zemlji krvi i meda"	2016	Embargo
"Sve mi nudi"	2017	Embargo
"Incidentno"	2017	Embargo
"Rizik"	2018	Embargo
"Lažni gospodin"	2019	Embargo
"Prva žena"	2022	Embargo
"Maska"	2022	Embargo
"Harem"	2023	Embargo
"Dama"	2024	Embargo

=== As a member of IF ===
Title	Year	Album
"Ne vjeruj muškarcima"	1999	Non-album singles
"Ako se desi"	2000	Non-album singles
"Ne mogu bez tebe"	2000	Non-album singles
"Grijeh i molitva"	2002	Žena sa Balkana
"Ne mogu bez tebe (2002 Version)"	2002	Žena sa Balkana

== Collaborations ==
=== As lead artist ===
Title	Year	Album
"Kad se ne da, ne da se" (feat. Aca Lukas)	2007	Ostrvo tuge
"Đavolica" (feat. Deda)	2009	Zakon sudbine
"Šta je od Boga, dobro je" (with Elvir Mekić)	2009	Kako nov and Zakon sudbine

=== As featured artist ===
Title	Year	Album
"Pokaži put do neba" (Zijad Redžić feat. Selma Bajrami)	1997	Non-album single
"Zar tebi da vjerujem?" (Ramiz Redžepović feat. Selma Bajrami)	1998	Ti si ta…
"Zabranjena ljubav" (Naser Bajrami feat. Selma Bajrami)	1999	Zabranjena ljubav
"To vodu ne pije" (Amir Kazić Leo feat. Selma Bajrami)	2005	Prokleta ljubav
"Gdje će ti duša?" (Enes Begović feat. Selma Bajrami)	2006	Oči boje badema
"Mlađe slađe" (Enela feat. Selma Bajrami)	2015	Embargo
"Neka gori ova noć" (Belmin feat. Selma Bajrami)	2021	Embargo

=== Collaborations with multiple artists ===
Title	Year	Note
"Ranjeno krilo nastavlja let"	2005	Kapija memorial project

== Music videos ==
=== As lead artist ===
Title	Year	Director(s)
"Pijanico"	1999	Arthur
"Život liječi rane"	1999	Arthur
"Ljubav si ubio, gade"	1999	Arthur
"Moj golube"	1999	Arthur
"Tako sam mlada"	2001	Arthur
"Svi ste vi isti"	2001	Arthur
"Nana"	2002	Arthur
"Žena sirena"	2002	Arthur
"Kakvo tijelo Selma ima"	2005	Ivan Čolić
"Tijelo uz tijelo"	2005	Muris Beglerović
"Ostrvo tuge"	2007	Dejan Milićević
"Promijeni se"	2008	Dejan Milićević
"Šta je od Boga, dobro je" (with Elvir Mekić)	2009	Dejan Milićević
"Farmerice"	2009	Muris Beglerović
"Voli me do bola"	2011	Hayat Production
"Bakšiš"	2011	Dejan Milićević
"Nisam ti oprostila"	2013	Dejan Milićević
"Tijelo bez duše"	2014	Dejan Milićević
"Zvjerka"	2016	Avik Shanic
"U zemlji krvi i meda"	2016	Dejan Milićević
"Incidentno"	2017	Ljuba Radivojević
"Rizik"	2018	Dino Šehić
"Lažni gospodin"	2019	Dejan Milićević
"Maska"	2022	David Mićić
"Harem"	2023	Dejan Milićević
"Dama"	2024	Haris Dubica

=== As a member of IF ===
Title	Year	Director(s)
"Ne vjeruj muškarcima"	1999	RTV TK
"Ne mogu bez tebe"	2000	Arthur

=== Guest appearances ===
Title	Year	Director(s)
"To vodu ne pije" (Amir Kazić Leo feat. Selma Bajrami)	2005	Hayat Production
"Mlađe slađe" (Enela feat. Selma Bajrami)	2015	Andrej Ilić
"Neka gori ova noć" (Belmin feat. Selma Bajrami)	2021	Ljuba Radivojević

=== With multiple artists ===
Title	Year	Note	Director(s)
"Ranjeno krilo nastavlja let"	2005	Kapija memorial project	Arthur
