= Mirza Delibašić Hall =

Sports venue in Sarajevo

- Skenderija
- Mirza Delibašić Hall in 2025
- Interactive map of Mirza Delibašić Hall
- Full name: Velika dvorana Mirza Delibašić
- Former names: Velika dvorana KSC Skenderija (1969–2001)
- Location: Skenderija, Centar, Sarajevo, Bosnia and Herzegovina
- Coordinates: 43°51′15″N 18°24′46″E
- Owner: Sarajevo Canton
- Operator: Kantonalno javno preduzeće Centar "Skenderija"
- Capacity: 5,616 (basketball, handball, ice hockey)
- Surface: versatile

Construction
- Opened: 29 November 1969
- Renovated: 2006, 2018
- Architects: Živorad Janković; Halid Muhasilović
- General contractor: Ognjeslav Malkin

Tenants
- KK Bosna; Bosnia and Herzegovina men's national basketball team Bosnia and Herzegovina men's national handball team

The Mirza Delibašić Hall (Serbo-Croatian: Dvorana Mirza Delibašić / Дворана Мирза Делибашић), commonly known as Skenderija Hall (Скендерија), is an indoor sporting arena located in Sarajevo, Bosnia and Herzegovina, as a part of Skenderija.

Opened on 23 November 1969, the seating capacity of the arena is 5,616. It is currently home to the KK Bosna basketball team and is named after its legendary player Mirza Delibašić.

== Sports ==
Notable basketball events hosted at the arena include the preliminary rounds of the 1970 FIBA World Championship, the 1970 FIBA European Champions Cup final in which Ignis Varese defeated CSKA Moscow 79-74 and the 1980 Intercontinental Cup tournament in which Maccabi Tel Aviv won the title.

== Concerts and other events ==
List of Concerts and Other Entertainment and Political Events
1960s
- Bitka na Neretvi premiere - November 29, 1969
1970s

1970s

- 4th "Vaš šlager sezone" - April 1970 (competitors: Arsen Dedić, Dubravka Fijala & Nikola Borota Radovan, Indexi, Zlatko Golubović, Bojan Kodrič, Anica Zubović, Pro arte, Leo Martin, Ljiljana Petrović, Tihomir Petrović, Lado Leskovar, Mišo Kovač)
- 5th "Vaš šlager sezone" - April 1971 (competitors: Dragan Antić, Kemal Monteno, Indexi, Ljiljana Petrović, Senka Veletanlić, Ambasadori, Zlatko Golubović, Ivica Tomović, Đorđe Marjanović, Radojka Šverko, Leo Martin, Miki Jevremović)
- 2nd "Congress of Self-Management (Drugi kongres samoupravljača Jugoslavije)" - May 5–8, 1971 (guests and delegates: Josip Broz Tito, Edvard Kardelj, Džemal Bijedić, Dušan Petrović)
- Jugovizija 1972 - February 12, 1972 (competitors: Tereza Kesovija, Dragan Antić, Dalibor Brun, Višnja Korbar, Zoran Leković, Leo Martin, Jadranka Stojaković, Bisera Veletanlić, and Radojka Šverko)
- Valter brani Sarajevo premiere - April 12, 1972
- 6th "Vaš šlager sezone" - April 15, 1972 (competitors: Pro arte, Kemal Monteno, Jutro, Đorđe Marjanović, Ivica Tomović, Boba Stefanović, Oto Pestner, Lola Novaković, Zdravko Čolić, Đorđi Peruzović, Đani Maršan, Dragan Antić, Nada Milinković)
- Indexi - October 29, 1972 (opening act: Jutro)
- 7th "Vaš šlager sezone" - April 1973 (competitors: Indexi, Zdravko Čolić, Ambasadori, Mahir Paloš, Kemal Monteno, Jadranka Stojaković, Iver, Boba Stefanović, Mišo Kovač, Ivica Šerfezi, Dubrovački trubaduri, Lutajuća Srca, Dragan Mijalkovski, Leo Martin, Majda Sepe, Nevia Rigutto, Zdenka Vučković, Đani Maršan, Dalibor Brun)
- 8th "Vaš šlager sezone" - April 1974 (competitors: Zdravko Čolić, Korni Grupa, Kemal Monteno, Duško Lokin, Bisera Veletanlić, Mahir Paloš, Nada Knežević, Ambasadori, Elda Viler, Indexi, Jadranka Stojaković, Lutajuća Srca, Sabina Varešanović, Dragan Mijalkovski, Dubrovački trubaduri)
- Korni Grupa - November 16, 1974 (Korni Grupa's Farewell Tour, opening act: Bijelo Dugme)
- Indexi - February 22, 1975 (opening act: Formula 4)
- 9th "Vaš šlager sezone" - April 1975 (competitors: Zdravko Čolić, Ambasadori, Kemal Monteno, Jadranka Stojaković, Duško Lokin, Tereza Kesovija, Indexi, Grupa 777 vs Ira Kraljić, Alma Ekmečić, Đani Maršan, Elda Viler, Neda Ukraden, Mahir Paloš, Leo Martin, Goran Gerin)
- Bijelo Dugme - February 7, 1976 (Šta bi dao da si na mom mjestu Tour)
- 10th "Vaš šlager sezone" - April 1976 (competitors: Kemal Monteno, Miki Jevremović, Duško Lokin, Indexi, Kićo Slabinac, Ambasadori, Neda Ukraden, Leo Martin, Maja Odžaklijevska, Jadranka Stojaković, Alma Ekmečić, Mišo Kovač, Ksenija Erker, Goran Gerin, Pepel in kri)
- Bijelo Dugme - February 11, 1977 (Eto! Baš hoću! Tour)
- Bijelo Dugme - February 12, 1977 (Eto! Baš hoću! Tour)
- 11th "Vaš šlager sezone" - April 1977 (competitors: Indexi, Oliver Dragojević, Fadil Toskić, Neda Ukraden, Rezonansa, Grupa 777, Ismeta Krvavac, Pro arte, Kemal Monteno, Pepel in kri, Ambasadori, Leo Martin, Zdenka Kovačiček, Radojka Šverko, Goran Gerin, Mahir Paloš)
- 12th "Vaš šlager sezone" - April 1978 (competitors: Seid Memić Vajta, Fadil Toskić, Bisera Veletanlić, Ambasadori, Neda Ukraden, Indexi, Kemal Monteno, Mahir Paloš, Dalibor Brun, Jadranka Stojaković, Selver Brdarić, Suncokret, Alma Ekmečić, Grupa 777, Grupa Makedonija, Mišo Kovač)
- Bijelo Dugme - December 4, 1978
- 13th "Vaš šlager sezone" - April 1979 (competitors: Gabi Novak, Seid Memić Vajta, Oliver Dragojević, Indexi, Mahir Paloš, Neda Ukraden, Duško Lokin, Novi Fosili, Mišo Kovač, Dragan Mijalkovski, Jadranka Stojaković, Kemal Monteno, Senad od Bosne, Leo Martin, Ambasadori)
- "Humanitarni koncert" - November 28, 1979 (Riblja Čorba, etc.) (in Ledena dvorana - small hall)
1980s

1980s

- Riblja Čorba - February 21, 1981 (Pokvarena mašta i prljave strasti Tour) (in Ledena dvorana - small hall)
- Riblja Čorba - February 22, 1981 (Pokvarena mašta i prljave strasti Tour) (in Ledena dvorana - small hall)
- "Mladost Sutjeske '81" - October 3, 1981 (headliners: Bijelo Dugme, Laboratorija Zvuka, Aerodrom, Zana, Paraf, Bulevar, and Indexi, opening acts: Zov, Formula 4, Ema, COD, Rezonansa, Super 98, Negra, Zabranjeno Pušenje, Žaoka, Ozbiljno Pitanje, Linija Života, Lucifer, Tečni Kristal, Tina, and Bedž)
- Riblja Čorba - October 31, 1981 (Pokvarena mašta i prljave strasti Tour) (in Ledena dvorana - small hall)
- Riblja Čorba - February 20, 1982 (Mrtva priroda Tour; Concert uncertain until last minute due to the controversy surrounding the band's "Na zapadu ništa novo" song. The show was given the go-ahead only after the band leader Bora Đorđević signed a liability waiver taking all responsibility in the event of any administrative or legal action as a result of the song's performance.)
- "Mladost Sutjeske '82" - September 18, 1982 (headliners: Indexi, Bijelo Dugme, and Vatreni Poljubac)
- Wishbone Ash - October 21, 1982
- Saxon - March 21, 1983 (opening act: SCH)
- Uriah Heep - May 15, 1983 (Head First Tour)
- Peter Green - June 1, 1983 (in Dansing Hall - small hall)
- Riblja Čorba - May 19, 1984 (Večeras vas zabavljaju muzičari koji piju Tour)
- "Čičkov desetosatni rock maraton — Uz malu pomoć mojih prijatelja" - November 24, 1984 (performers: Bajaga i Instruktori, Leb i Sol, Laboratorija Zvuka, U Škripcu, Drugi Način, Galija, Indexi, Divlje Jagode, Vatreni Poljubac, Elvis J. Kurtovich & His Meteors, Kongres)
- Rory Gallagher - January 19, 1985 (in Ledena dvorana - small hall)
- Bijelo Dugme - March 2, 1985 (Kosovka devojka Tour)
- Riblja Čorba - June 15, 1985 (Istina Tour) (in Ledena dvorana - small hall)
- "Manifestacija narodne muzike Sarajevo '85" - 1985 (hosts: Radinka Kapetanović and Rinko Golubović, house band: RTV Sarajevo's Great Folk Orchestra led by Slobodan Vidović, performers: Fahrudin Bajrić, Vančo Tarabunov & Fana Šomova, Vesna Hadžić, Ćazim Čolaković, Nedžat Suma, Jasenka Ernoić, Stanimir Lale Petrović, Emir Dedić, Julija Bisak & Mostovi, Hamid Ragipović Besko, Zekerijah Đezić, Gordana Stojićević, Dušan Kostić, Mirko Rondović & Mostovi)
- "Rock uranak" - March 8, 1986 (Riblja Čorba, etc.)
- "Pjesma za Crvenu jabuku" - October 13, 1986 (In Memoriam for Dražen Ričl and Aljoša Buha, performers: Plesni orkestar RTV Sarajevo, Kemal Monteno, Ismeta Krvavac, Vajta, Indexi, Bijelo Dugme, Vatreni Poljubac, Merlin, Valentino, Hari Mata Hari, Plavi Orkestar, Đino Banana, Maratonci, Bolero, Gru Gru)
- Plavi Orkestar - April 1987 (Smrt fašizmu Tour; guest: Tifa)
1990s

1990s

- Top lista nadrealista - February 17, 1990 (performers: Zabranjeno Pušenje and Bombaj Štampa)
- "Yugoslav Basketball League All-Star Game" - May 7, 1991
- Tifa - July 27, 1996 (guests: Elvira Rahić and Perica Simonović)
- Tony Cetinski - October 12, 1996
- Parni Valjak - November 16, 1996 (guest: Alka Vuica)
- Psihomodo Pop + Massimo Savić - December 28, 1996
- Indexi - 1997
- Đorđe Balašević - February 7, 1998
- Đorđe Balašević - February 8, 1998
- Tifa - March 1, 1998
- Hari Mata Hari - December 17, 1998
- Sinan Sakić & Branka Sovrlić - February 18, 1999 (12,000 in attendance)
- Bajaga i Instruktori - October 28, 1999 (opening act: Drugo Stanje)
- Oliver Dragojević - November 25, 1999
2000s

2000s

- Doris Dragović - February 14, 2000
- Severina - March 25, 2000 (guests: Amir Kazić Leo, {Seven Up, Sar-e-Roma)
- "Forte 2000" - December 28, 2000 (competitors: Amir Kazić Leo, Željko Samardžić, IF, Omar Mehmedbasic, Halid Bešlić+Donna Ares, Senna M, Mia Martina, Edwin Po, Đogani Fantastiko, Sanja Volić, Sandi Cenov, Mi Beranek, Momčilo, Goca Tržan, and Igor Vukojević ... guests: Goran Karan, Magazin)
- Gibonni - February 14, 2001
- Halid Bešlić & Friends - February 22, 2001 (guests: Kemal Monteno, Haris Džinović, Josip Pejaković, Indexi, Željko Bebek, Nedžad Imamović, Burhan Šaban)
- Goran Karan + Colonia - April 27, 2001 (guests: Knock Out, Punkt)
- Tifa - October 5, 2001 (guest: Milić Vukašinović, Gordana Ivandić, Jelena Rozga, Zele Lipovača, and Toni Janković)
- Prljavo Kazalište - December 20, 2001
- BH Eurosong 2003 - March 1, 2003
- Kemal Monteno & Friends - April 12, 2003 (guests: Zdravko Čolić, Arsen Dedić, Gabi Novak, Rade Šerbedžija, Lado Leskovar, Danijela Martinović, Žera, Boris Novković, Tifa, Zlatan Fazlić, Deen, Halid Bešlić, Nedžad Imamović, Emir Balić)
- "Sarajevski karanfil" - May 20, 2003 (mass high school graduation party, performers: Tifa, Toše Proeski, Valentino, Deen, Donna Ares, Rizo Ruza)
- "Vječni sjaj" - December 1, 2004 (In honour and memory of Mirza Delibašić and Davorin Popović, performers: Kemal Monteno, Hari Varešanović, Konvoj, Irina Kapetanović, Amila Glamočak, Nermin Puškar, Almas Smajlović, Sabahudin Kurt, Dražen Žerić, Halid Bešlić)
- Crvena Jabuka - April 6, 2005 (guests: Severina, Kemal Monteno, Narcis Vučina)
- Jamiroquai - June 23, 2005 (Dynamite Tour)
- Toše Proeski - May 12, 2006 (guests: Igor Vukojević, Burhan Šaban, Nešad Selman)
- David Morales - July 6, 2007
- Željko Samardžić - December 20, 2007
- "Indexi i prijatelji" - May 7, 2008 (performers: Fadil Redžić, etc.)
- Seka Aleksić - April 19, 2008
- “Bajram dođe, mirišu avlije” - September 30, 2008
- Tiësto - May 15, 2009 (warm up: DJ Wedran, DJ Focho, DJ Black Acid, and DJ Stereo Palma)
- 2nd “Bajram dođe, mirišu avlije” - September 20, 2009 (Burhan Šaban, Eldin Huseinbegović, Armin Muzaferija, Abid Sakalaš, Mensura Bajraktarević, Emina Karović, Omer Zulić, Miralem Babajić, Nedžla Kovačević, Ena Brdar, Vanja Muhović, Ibro Bublin, choirs MIZ Sarajevo, "Sejfullah", "Bedem", "Kewser", "Gazel", "Preporod", "Dah ljubavi")
2010s

2010s

- Outlandish - February 8, 2010
- Bushido - April 24, 2010
- "Tri kralja" - May 13, 2010 (performers: Šaban Šaulić, Miroslav Ilić, and Halid Bešlić)
- Vaya Con Dios - June 18, 2010
- Carl Cox - July 9, 2010 (supporting act: Jon Rundell)
- 3rd “Bajram dođe, mirišu avlije” - September 9, 2010 (Hari Varešanović, Burhan Šaban, Armin Muzaferija, Lejla Jusić, Kemo Hasić, Eldin Huseinbegović, choirs MIZ Sarajevo, "Kewser", "Rejjan")
- 9th "BH Muzički Oskar" - November 11, 2010
- Aco Pejović - May 19, 2011
- 4th “Bajram dođe, mirišu avlije” - August 30, 2011 (Elvira Rahić, Burhan Šaban, Aziz Alili, Eldin Huseinbegović, Armin Muzaferija, Mirza Šoljanin, Lejla Jusić, choirs MIZ Sarajevo, MIZ Livno, "Mektebski bulbuli")
- 10th "BH Muzički Oskar" - October 13, 2011 (performers: Selma Bajrami, Halid Bešlić, Šaban Šaulić, Hanka Paldum, Sejo Boy, Ilda Šaulić, Tifa, Enes Begović, Šerif Konjević, Dženan Lončarević, Jana, Dragana Mirković)
- Enes Begović - November 26, 2011
- Mostar Sevdah Reunion - December 8, 2011
- Dženan Lončarević - May 17, 2012 (guests: Tropico Band, Goca Tržan, and Mirza Šoljanin)
- 5th “Bajram dođe, mirišu avlije” - August 19, 2012 (Burhan Šaban, Enes Begović, Eldin Huseinbegović, Lejla Jusić, Armin Muzaferija, Latif Moćević, Alen Čišija, Amra Memagić, Alma Subašić, Šerif Delić, Miralem Babajić, Salem Hurić, Mustafa Isaković, Omer Zulić, Vesul Alić, Senida Klisura, Fatih Orhan Cakmak, choirs MIZ Sarajevo, "Mektebski bulbuli", "Bostan")
- Jelena Rozga - November 9, 2012 (guests: Halid Bešlić and Petar Grašo)
- "Indexi i prijatelji" - November 23, 2012 (50th anniversary of Indexi being formed, performers: Fadil Redžić, Ranko Rihtman, Kornelije Kovač, Nenad Jurin, Miroslav Šaranović, Đorđe Uzelac, Slobodan Misaljević, Nuno Arnautalić, Enco Lesić, Muris Varajić, Željko Bebek, Irina Kapetanović, Željka Katavić Pilj, Branko Đurić, Jasna Gospić, Kaliopi, Goran Karan, Dado Topić, Amira Medunjanin, Boris Novković, Tifa, Zoran Predin, Aki Rahimovski, Maya Sar, Massimo Savić, Hari Varešanović, Arsen Dedić, Fazla)
- Džej - December 22, 2012 (guests: Amela Zuković, Šaćir Ameti, Anida Idrizović, and Mia Ar)
- Saša Matić - April 27, 2013 (guests: Jelena Karleuša, Dejan Matić, Adnan Jakupović)
- Sergej Ćetković - June 7, 2013 (guests: Maya Sar, Kemal Monteno)
- 6th “Bajram dođe, mirišu avlije” - August 8, 2013 (Burhan Šaban, Armin Muzaferija, Hanka Paldum, Eldin Huseinbegović, Lejla Jusić, Aziz Alili, Resul Alić, Vanja Muhović, Naida Čatić, choirs MIZ Sarajevo, "Mektebski bulbuli", "Bostan")
- Dubioza Kolektiv - December 13, 2013
- Zabranjeno Pušenje - December 28, 2013 (guests: Halid Bešlić and Arabeske; opening acts: Grafit, Boris Dežulović & Predrag Lucić, Elvir Laković Laka)
- Zvijezda možeš biti ti season 6 final - May 16, 2014 (guests: Goca Tržan, Lexington Band, Hari Varešanović, Mirza Šoljanin, Milan Stanković, Enes Begović)
- 7th “Bajram dođe, mirišu avlije” - July 28, 2014 (Eldin Huseinbegović, Fatih Koca, Elvira Rahić, Aziz Alili, Šerif Delić, Kenan Mačković, Naida Čatić, Lejla Čaušević, Resul Alić, Mustafa Isković, Senida Balić, Miralem Babajić, choirs "Hilal", "Šapat srca", "Misbah", "Mektebski bulbuli", MIZ Sarajevo)
- Zvijezda možeš biti ti season 7 final - May 15, 2015 (guests: Seka Aleksić, Lexington Band, Nikola Rokvić, Dženan Lončarević, Tijana Dapčević, Hanka Paldum)
- 8th “Bajram dođe, mirišu avlije” - July 17, 2015 (Sami Özer, Eldin Huseinbegović, Burhan Šaban, Hafiz Sulejman Bugari, Denial Ahmetović, Kenan Mačković, Latif Miočević, Ena Brdar, Selma Droce, Mensura Bajraktarević, Lejla Čaušević, Selma Popaja, Šejla Džakmić, Resul Alić, Mustafa Isaković, Šerif Delić, Miralem Babajić, choirs MIZ Sarajevo, „Šapat srca“, „Hilal“, „Derman“)
- Tropico Band - October 16, 2015 (guest: Mirza Šoljanin)
- 2Cellos - May 13, 2016
- 9th “Bajram dođe, mirišu avlije” - July 5, 2016 (Hanka Paldum, Eldin Huseinbegović, Burhan Šaban, Senad Podojak, Armin Muzaferija, Zejd Šoto, Rusmir Memić, Aldijana Tuzlak-Bećar, Zanin Berbić, Hikmet Hadžiabdić, Miralem Babajić, Šerif Delić, Mustafa Isaković, Mustafa Demirci, choirs "Mektebski bulbuli", "Sejfullah", "Preporod", "En-Nahl", and MIZ Sarajevo)
- Đurologija XXL by Đuro i prijatelji - October 1, 2016
- Massimo Savić - April 26, 2017
- Moj ummete 2017 - May 25, 2017
- Audicija - October 5, 2017
- Audicija - October 6, 2017
- Audicija - October 8, 2017
- Željko Joksimović - November 29, 2017 (48th anniversary of Skenderija opening)
- Dubioza kolektiv - December 1, 2017 (48th anniversary of Skenderija opening)
- Đorđe Balašević - February 17, 2018
- Kraftwerk - February 25, 2018
- 11th “Bajram dođe, mirišu avlije” - June 15, 2018
- Jala Brat & Buba Corelli - August 9, 2018 (guests: Severina, Senidah)
- Russian Ice Stars performing Snow White on Ice - December 14, 2018
- Russian Ice Stars performing Snow White on Ice - December 15, 2018
- Russian Ice Stars performing Snow White on Ice - December 16, 2018
- Zabranjeno Pušenje - December 29, 2018 (free admission, guests: Alen Islamović, Zele Lipovača, Damir Imamović, and Sassja)
- Maya Berović - March 23, 2019
- Massimo Savić - April 12, 2019
- "Born in Ghetto" - August 13, 2019 (InaS$, Senidah, Jala Brat, RAF Camora, Buba Corelli, Coby, Katarina Grujić, Fox, Surreal, Goga Sekulić, Kuku$ Klan, Kedži OG, Kiki, Baka Prase)
- Goran Bregović - August 24, 2019 (Tri pisma iz Sarajeva Tour)
- "Ž. A. Čičak, izvan vremena za sva vremena — Uz malu pomoć mojih prijatelja" - November 9, 2019 (Neverne Bebe, Vatreni Poljubac, Crvena Jabuka, Dejan Cukić & Spori Ritam Band, Opća opasnost, Emir & Frozen Camels, Martin Turner)
- Kakva ti je žena, takav ti je život by Dragan "Maca" Marinković - November 28, 2019
- Haris Džinović - November 29, 2019 (50th anniversary of Skenderija opening)
- Carmina Burana by North Macedonia National Opera and Ballet - November 30, 2019
- Dame biraju - December 1, 2019
2020s

2020s

- Gipsy Kings - February 20, 2020
- Bruce Dickinson & Zagreb Philharmonic Orchestra - March 22, 2023
- 16th "Bajram dođe, mirišu avlije" - April 21, 2023 (Eldin Huseinbegović, Burhan Šaban, Aziz Alili, Naida Kraljić, Šaha Isaković, Mirza Ganić, Ibrahim Bilčević, choirs "Preporod" and MIZ Sarajevo)
- Dženan Lončarević - May 13, 2023
- Gibonni - May 27, 2023
- Aca Lukas - November 8, 2023 (Pokidan film premiere prior to concert)
- Tea Tairović - December 9, 2023 (Na jednu noć Tour)
- 17th "Bajram dođe, mirišu avlije" - April 10, 2024 (Sami Özer, Mustafa Demirci, Burhan Šaban, choir Hamza, Naida Kraljić, Kenan Mačković, Kenan Hasić, and Ibrahim Bilčević)
- Zabranjeno Pušenje - May 24, 2024 (free admission, Das ist Walter 40th Anniversary)
- Semir Cerić Koke - October 26, 2024 (35 years on the scene, guests: Snežana Đurišić, Armin Šaković, Fatmir Sulejmani)
- Peđa Jovanović - November 1, 2024
- "Mali šlager" - December 14, 2024
- Milica Pavlović - May 10, 2025 originally scheduled for March 8, 2025 but postponed due to Ramadan.
- Senidah - August 1, 2025 (guest: Dino Merlin)
- Crvena Jabuka - October 11, 2025 (40th year anniversary) originally scheduled for January 25, 2025 at Zetra Hall but postponed and changed venue due to low ticket sales.
- Aca Lukas - November 1, 2025 ("Kafanska noć", opening acts: Miroslav Ilić and Mira Škorić)
- José Carreras – March 7, 2026
- Komedija je ozbiljna stvar by Goran Vinčić Vinča – April 1, 2026
- Budapest Gypsy Symphony Orchestra – April 9, 2026
- Emina Jahović – October 31, 2026
- Jakov Jozinović – November 24, 2026
- Nikola Rokvić – March 13, 2027

== See also ==
- List of indoor arenas in Bosnia and Herzegovina

Preceded by Palau dels Esports; Barcelona	FIBA European Champions Cup; Final venue 1970	Succeeded by Sporthal Arena; Antwerp
Preceded by Ginásio do Ibirapuera; São Paulo	FIBA Intercontinental Cup; Final venue 1980	Succeeded by Ginásio do Ibirapuera; São Paulo
