= Selma Bajrami =

Bosnian singer (born 1980)

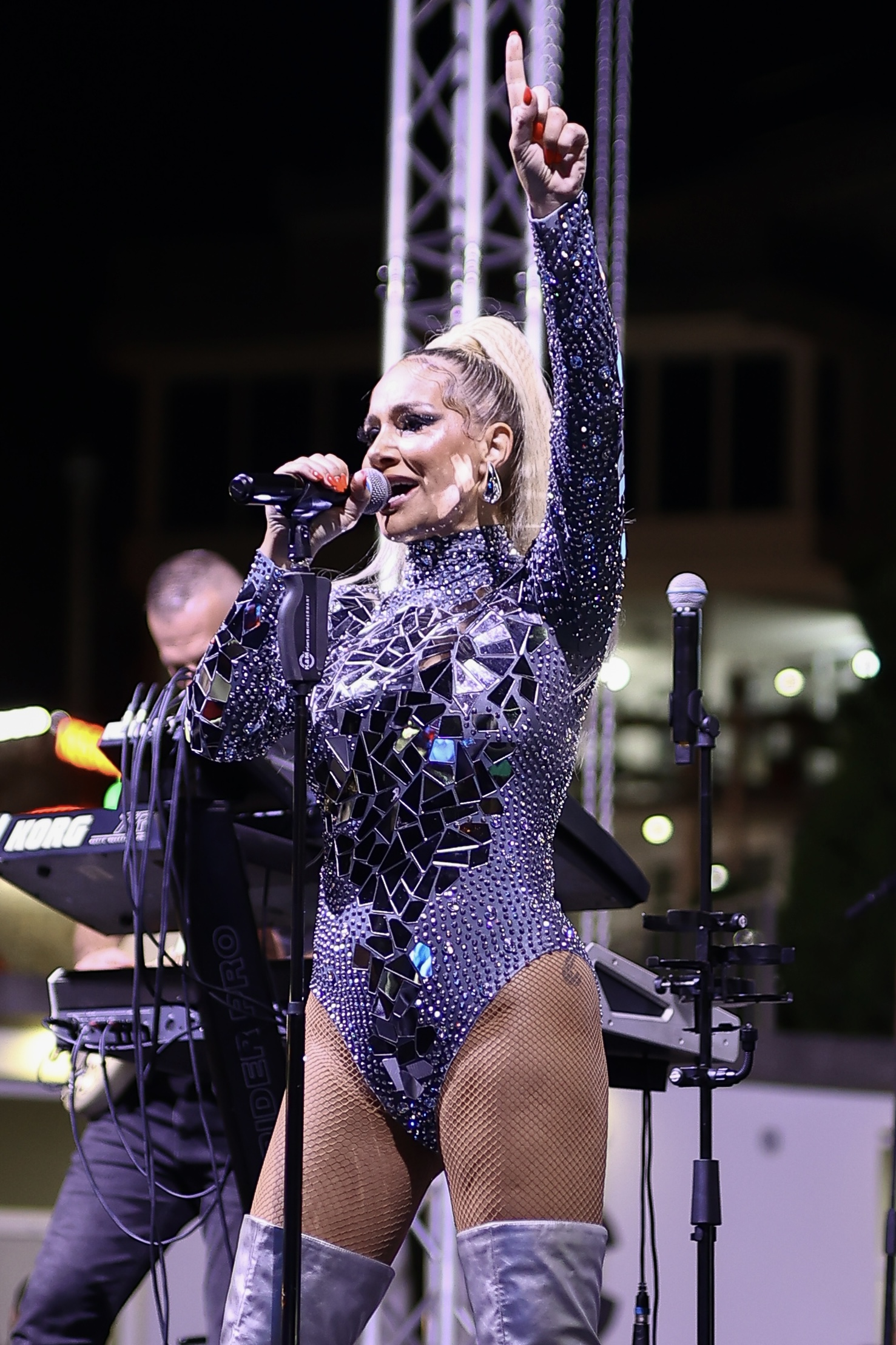
- Bajrami in 2025
- Born: 4 July 1980 (age 46); Tuzla, SR Bosnia and Herzegovina, SFR Yugoslavia
- Occupations: Singer; songwriter; dancer
- Years active: 1997–present
- Works: Discography
- Height: 1.63 m (5 ft 4 in)
- Spouses: Zoran Vučković (m. 2003; div. 2004) Mujo Musić (m. 2011; div. 2016)
- Children: 1
- Awards: Full list
- Musical career
- Genres: Pop-folk; pop; folk; turbo-folk; dance-pop; pop-rock
- Instrument: Vocals
- Labels: Nimfa Sound; Grand Production; Hayat Production; City Records; IDJTunes
- Formerly of: IF
- Website: selmabajrami.com

Signature
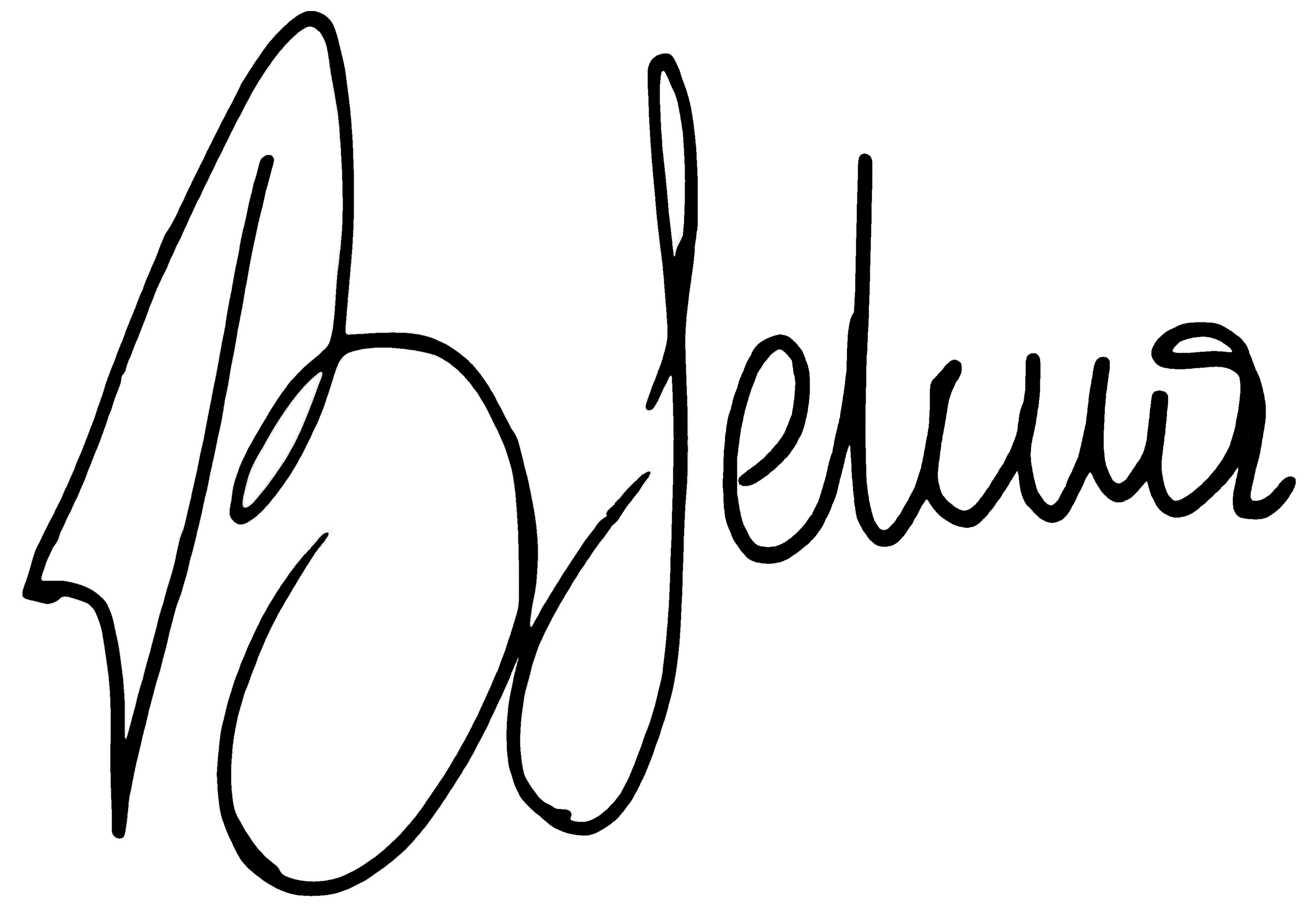

Selma Bajrami (born 4 July 1980) is a Bosnian singer. She began her professional music career with the release of her debut studio album Kad suza ne bude... in 1998, and has since released nine studio albums. Bajrami achieved her greatest popularity during the 2000s and is regarded as one of the most prominent and commercially successful popular music performers from Bosnia and Herzegovina. She is best known for her hit songs "Kakvo tijelo Selma ima" (2004), "Tijelo uz tijelo" (2004), "Ostrvo tuge" (2007), "Lijepe žene" (2007), and "Farmerice" (2009).

== Early life ==
Selma Bajrami was born in Tuzla, Bosnia and Herzegovina, then part of SFR Yugoslavia, to a Muslim family. Her mother, Enesa Bajrami (née Suljić; born 2 March 1960), is Bosniak, from the village of Kuge near Srebrenik, and her father, Fadil Bajrami (born 30 March 1957 in Lukavac), was of mixed Bosniak and Kosovo Albanian heritage. Her paternal grandfather, Redžep Bajrami (8 September 1933 – 12 April 2013), was born in Gjilan, then part of the Kingdom of Yugoslavia (now in Kosovo), and later settled in Tuzla.

Selma has an older sister, Fahira Bajrami (born 13 July 1977), and a younger brother, Enis Bajrami (born 12 September 1984).

She grew up in the nearby village of Mramor, where she spent the entirety of the Bosnian War (1992–1995). During this time, she began performing at local festivals and venues.

She graduated in 1997 from the Mixed Chemical High School in Tuzla, cosmetology program.

== Career ==
=== 1998–2003: From Kad suza ne bude… to Žena sa Balkana, IF, and Eurovision national selection ===
Bajrami debuted in 1998 with the album Kad suza ne bude..., released by the record label Nimfa Sound. Early in her career, she gained attention with hits such as "Njemu osmijeh, meni suze", "Šta će žena ta?", and "Nije moja majka kriva".

Shortly after her debut, Bajrami joined the all-female pop group IF from Tuzla. She was the lead vocalist of the group, while backing vocals were provided by Mirela Ibrahimović and Dragana Milić. Between 1999 and 2000, the group released three songs: "Ne vjeruj muškarcima", "Ne mogu bez tebe", and "Ako se desi". With the song "Ne mogu bez tebe", they participated at the VIII Mediterranean Music Festival Budva 2000, while with "Ako se desi" they performed at the III International Pop Music Festival Forte 2000 in Sarajevo.

In 1999, she released her second studio album Ljubav si ubio gade, which brought her nationwide popularity in Bosnia and Herzegovina. It established her as one of the most promising young performers. The album produced several hits, including "Pijanico", "Život liječi rane", "Mrva hljeba", and the title track. The song "Nikad od tebe čovjeka" was written for her by acclaimed singer-songwriter Dino Merlin. That same year, she also participated at the Bihaćki festival with the song "Daleko od očiju, daleko od srca".

Her third studio album, Revolucija, was released in June 2001. This marked her first appearance on the Serbian music scene, where she performed on RTV Pink and Grand Production shows. The album was released by Nimfa Sound in Bosnia and Herzegovina and by Grand Production in Serbia. Saša Popović, director of Grand Production, introduced her on Grand Show as the most popular singer from Bosnia and Herzegovina. The album featured popular songs such as "Svi ste vi isti", "Otvori se, zemljo", and "Oči zelene".

Her fourth studio album, Žena sa Balkana, was released in 2002 and was her final release with Nimfa Sound. The album included notable tracks such as "Nana", "Škorpija", and "Žena sirena", the latter of which became one of her signature nicknames.

In 2003, Bajrami competed in the Bosnian national selection for the Eurovision Song Contest, finished in sixth place in the final with the song "Zaljubljena".

=== 2004–2008: Kakvo tijelo Selma ima, Ostrvo tuge, and the Show Zvijezde sa zvijezdama ===
After ending her contract with Nimfa Sound, Bajrami released her fifth studio album Kakvo tijelo Selma ima on 27 December 2004, under the Saraton and Song Zelex labels. A reissue was released in April 2005 by Hayat Production. Songs such as the title track, "Tijelo uz tijelo", and "Kad iza sebe pogledam" helped solidify Bajrami's status as one of the leading pop-folk artists in the Balkans. On Kakvo tijelo Selma ima, Bajrami was credited as the composer of "Divlji zov" and "Prva ljubav", and as the lyricist of "Ljubavi jedina". Notably, in 2010, a demo version of the song "Muška suza" surfaced on YouTube, performed by Dragana Mirković.

According to media reports, Bajrami was initially selected to represent Bosnia and Herzegovina at the Eurovision Song Contest 2005 with the song "C'mon Boy". However, just days before the national selection, the song was withdrawn after its songwriter, Aleksandra Kovač, decided to keep it for herself. Kovač later won an MTV award with the same song.

Bajrami's sixth studio album, Ostrvo tuge, was released on 25 April 2007, by Grand Production and sold over 280,000 copies, making it her best-selling album to date. The standout tracks included "Ostrvo tuge", "Promijeni se", "Korak do nervnog sloma", and "Lijepe žene". The video for the title track was shot in Skopje in late 2006. The album also featured a duet with Aca Lukas titled "Kad se ne da, ne da se". The song "Tako si hladan" was written by Bajrami herself.

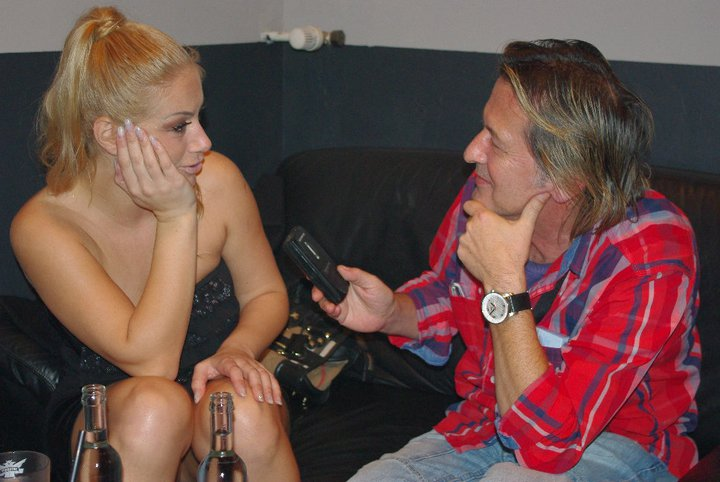
Bajrami giving a career-defining interview to journalist Zijad Žuna in the late 2000s.

From 26 October to 28 December 2008, Bajrami took part in the second season of the talent show Zvijezde sa zvijezdama, where she and her partner, Enver Lugavić Kice, emerged as winners.

=== 2009–2014: Hit singles, Zakon sudbine, reality show, and Selma ===
In July 2009, Bajrami released the single "Đavolica" featuring rapper Deda, followed by the duet "Šta je od Boga, dobro je" with Macedonian singer Elvir Mekić in November. The single "Farmerice", along with its accompanying music video, premiered on 24 December 2009. In February 2010, she competed in Grand Axal III festival with the song "Rukujmo se kao prijatelji".

Her seventh studio album, Zakon sudbine, was released on 2 June 2010, marking her final release under Grand Production. The album sold over 100,000 copies and included hits like "Voli me do bola", "Bakšiš", "Sarajevo", and the title track. The song "Nemoj da se šališ" was written by Bajrami herself.

On 19 January 2011, she released a reissue of Zakon sudbine via Hayat Production. That same year, Hayat TV aired her reality show Voli me do bola, in which Selma searched for dancers and models for the music video of the title song, which was filmed in August.

Between 2011 and 2013, Bajrami appeared as a special guest performer at three consecutive grand finales of the Bosnian music competition "Zvijezda možeš biti ti", all held at Sarajevo's Zetra Olympic Hall, where Mirza Šoljanin, Anida Idrizović and Denial Ahmetović respectively claimed victory.

The first single from her eighth studio album Selma was originally titled "Djevojke", but was later renamed "James Dean". A 20-second preview was released on SoundCloud on 30 November 2012, while the full version premiered on YouTube on 14 December 2012.

On 27 April 2013, Selma served as a special guest at Saša Matić’s first headlined concert in Sarajevo, held at the Mirza Delibašić Hall.

On 19 December 2013, Bajrami released the ballad "Nisam ti oprostila" as the album's second single. The music video for the song was filmed in August 2013. Less than two weeks later, she performed the emotional ballad "Moje milo" during a New Year's Eve television special. Serving as the album's third single, the song is dedicated to her son, who was 17 months old at the time.

On 4 June 2014, the album's fourth single "Tijelo bez duše" — an upbeat pop track co-produced by Atelje Trag – premiered with a music video that had been filmed in March 2014.

The full album was released on 23 July 2014 through City Records, with a physical edition issued in a print run of 50,000 copies. A Bosnian edition followed in late October 2014, released by Hayat Production.

=== 2015–2024: From "Mlađe slađe" to Embargo ===
On 9 October 2015, Selma released a duet with Enela Palavra titled "Mlađe slađe" under the IDJTunes label. The music video, filmed in August 2015, became a hit and currently has over 15 million views.

On 9 May 2016, she released the single "Zvjerka" on digital platforms. The music video, shot in Mostar, was published on YouTube on 15 June 2016. Her televised performance of the song on the Zvezde Granda specijal has amassed over 33 million views.

This was followed by several singles in quick succession, including "Uzbuna" (23 September 2016), and "U zemlji krvi i meda" (16 December 2016), a song inspired by the tragic love story of Boško and Admira, often referred to as the 'Romeo and Juliet of Sarajevo'.

On 7 July 2017, she released "Sve mi nudi", and later that year, "Incidentno" — first on digital platforms on 1 December, followed by its music video release on 22 December.

In February 2018, Selma announced a high-profile collaboration with Jala Brat and Buba Corelli. The track, titled "Rizik", was initially intended as a duet with Buba Corelli and was scheduled for release on the Imperia YouTube channel on 24 August 2018. However, due to creative disagreements, the original version was never officially released. A teaser uploaded on Imperia's channel gained over 250,000 views within 24 hours, and shortly after, the unreleased duet version featuring Buba leaked online. On 13 September 2018, the official version of "Rizik", now featuring Marko Dragić Pablo in Corelli's place, was released along with a music video.

On her 39th birthday, 4 July 2019, Selma released the single "Lažni gospodin".

Between 2021 and 2023, she continued releasing singles such as "Neka gori ova noć" (a collaboration with young artist Belmin Malkić) (4 December 2021), as well as "Prva žena" (27 March 2022), "Maska" (30 December 2022), and "Harem" (17 October 2023).

On 18 March 2024, she released the single "Dama", written for her by renowned Bosnian singer-songwriter Al' Dino. Selma stated that the music video for the song was her response to the media lynching she experienced following her ban from entering Serbia. The video was directed by Haris Dubica and features a scene in which Selma appears on the pillar of shame, reminiscent of the famous "Walk of Shame" sequence from Game of Thrones—a reference also noted on the official YouTube channel beneath the video as the inspiration for the scene. Interestingly, most of the footage was filmed in her mother's native village of Kuge.

On 30 August 2024, Selma released the single "Embargo", completing a body of work spanning nearly a decade. With this release, she finalized her ninth studio album, which she described as a personal and emotional reflection of the past ten years of her life. The album includes songs recorded and released between 2015 and 2024, encapsulating the different artistic and emotional phases she experienced during that period.

=== 2025–present: Recent activities ===
In 2025, Bajrami revealed that she was working on her tenth studio album with a new team of collaborators and announced a concert tour in Bosnia and Herzegovina.

On 17 August 2025, Bajrami attended the third night of the Sarajevo Film Festival and appeared on the red carpet. According to Azra.ba, her presence, alongside Hanka Paldum and Dino Merlin, "stole the spotlight" from the attending actors and film stars.

== Artistry ==
=== Musical style ===
Bajrami is known for her versatility across different music genres. Her early work was primarily folk, showcased in her debut album Kad suza ne bude..., while her second album, Ljubav si ubio, gade, included both folk and pop songs. During this period, she was also a member of the pop group IF, in which she performed as the lead vocalist from 1999 to 2002. Her fourth album, Žena sa Balkana, was intentionally divided between pop and pop-folk songs, reflecting her dual musical direction. From this album onward, she alternated between pop and pop-folk songs, frequently incorporating elements of turbo-folk and dance-pop.

=== Lyrical themes and image ===
Many of Bajrami’s songs explore themes of love, sensuality, self-confidence, and female empowerment, while also frequently dealing with toxic and turbulent romantic relationships. Her lyrical persona often portrays women as self-aware, emotionally expressive, and conscious of their attractiveness and value, which became one of the recognizable aspects of her public image and musical identity.

=== Voice and performances ===
She is recognized for her strong vocals and energetic, dance-oriented live performances. Her interpretation of songs often combines emotional expressiveness with dynamic stage presence, frequently incorporating choreography and dance elements, making her performance style distinctive across the former Yugoslavia.

== Personal life ==
=== Residences ===
During the early stages of her career, Bajrami lived between Tuzla and Mramor, where she was raised. In 2004, she moved to Sarajevo but continued visiting both places, where members of her family remained. She had an apartment in the Stupine neighborhood of Tuzla, and from 2009 to 2012, she resided in the Bosmal City Center residential complex. In mid-2012, after her marriage, she moved to Vienna, Austria, where she has lived since, while frequently visiting Bosnia and Herzegovina. Since 2017, she has resided in a house in Purkersdorf, a town near Vienna.

=== Marriages ===
Bajrami met her first husband, Zoran Vučković from Sarajevo, in March 2003 in the Croatian city of Makarska. They married in September 2003, and the marriage ended in divorce in February 2004. Bajrami later stated that the divorce was caused by pressure from their surroundings.

She met her second husband, Mujo Musić (born 28 November 1980), originally from Zvornik, in July 2011 during a performance at Modrac Lake near Lukavac. They married on 22 December 2011 at Hotel Tuzla and subsequently moved to Vienna, Austria, where Bajrami has lived since 2012. In October 2014, she filed for divorce, with media reports claiming her husband demanded €100,000 for a mutual settlement. After a lengthy legal process, the marriage was officially dissolved in May 2016.

=== Children and custody ===
Her original expected due date was on her 32nd birthday, 4 July 2012, but she gave birth to her son, Daris, seven days later, on 11 July 2012, via caesarean section in Vienna. She later stated that she does not celebrate her son's birthday on that day because it falls exactly on the anniversary of the Srebrenica genocide, out of respect for the victims, and instead marks the occasion the following day.

On 23 December 2020, custody of Daris was granted to her former husband. Bajrami later stated that during the COVID-19 pandemic she lacked legal representation, while her former husband allegedly filed multiple false claims against her. As she did not respond, the court interpreted this as consent, resulting in his custody being awarded. She has publicly discussed her limited contact with her son, stating that her ex-husband often prevents Daris from calling her. In June 2025, she shared a TikTok comment attributed to Daris, in which he expressed missing her despite the restrictions.

== Philanthropy ==
=== Humanitarian concerts ===
Bajrami has frequently participated in humanitarian concerts supporting those in need, particularly in the Balkan region.

On 14 May 2009, a concert titled "Prijatelji od rođenja" was held at the Mejdan Sports Hall in Tuzla. All proceeds from ticket sales were used for equipment and reconstruction of the Clinic for Children's Diseases at the University Clinical Center Tuzla. Other performers included Hanka Paldum, Crvena Jabuka, Enes Begović and others.

On 26 May 2011, Bajrami performed at the humanitarian concert "Za život" at the Youth Centre Skenderija in Sarajevo, organized to raise funds for three seriously ill children. She appeared alongside several fellow artists, including Hanka Paldum.

=== Donations and personal contributions ===
Following the birth of her son in July 2012, Bajrami donated his umbilical cord stem cells to the children's leukemia department at a hospital in Mödling, Austria, contributing to treatment efforts for young patients.

During the 2015 European migrant crisis, Bajrami personally assisted refugees in Austria. She visited a refugee center near Traiskirchen, providing food, clothing, hygiene supplies, and baby necessities to migrants who had recently arrived in the country.

In January 2016, she donated her performance fee and, together with the owner of the Matrix club, Fuad Jukić, arranged assistance for people in need in Trnovac, Bosnia and Herzegovina, a community facing economic difficulties.

In February 2016, Bajrami attended a humanitarian reception organized by the Austrian government, invited by Michael Häupl, the mayor of Vienna. She represented Bosnia and the surrounding region, and the event raised funds for a children's hospital in Vienna treating patients from Serbia and Bosnia and Herzegovina.

=== Support for humanitarian campaigns ===
In September 2024, she participated in the humanitarian campaign “Naše mjesto”, organized by the retail chain Bingo together with actor Enis Bešlagić. Gifts and donations were distributed to residents of Tuzla, and Bingo donated 10,000 BAM to the association Zmajevo Srce, which provides employment opportunities for people with Down syndrome.

Bajrami also supported the campaign "Za naše ljude", organized by N1 and Nova BH in cooperation with the humanitarian organization Pomozi.ba, aimed at raising funds for communities affected by floods in Jablanica, Bosnia and Herzegovina. During a live broadcast on 8 October 2024, she appealed to viewers to call the dedicated humanitarian number and contribute.

In 2025, she assisted Serbian singer Dragana Mirković in connecting with the humanitarian organization Pomozi.ba, which resulted in a donation of 20,000 BAM from Mirković.

== Public image and controversies ==
=== Early controversies ===
In January 2009, TV Vogošća aired Selma Bajrami's music video for the song "Nana" at 7:10 pm, in which she plays a teacher handing out candies to children. Following the broadcast, the Communications Regulatory Agency of Bosnia and Herzegovina (CRA) issued a written warning to the local TV station, stating that the message of the music video called into question the welfare and dignity of minors.

=== Political and social activism ===
In February 2014, she publicly supported the protests in Tuzla, after which she received threats on social media.

On 3 May 2022, Bajrami visited Davor Dragičević, who had been protesting for over a month in front of the Prosecutor's Office of Bosnia and Herzegovina, demanding justice for the murder of his son David and the uncovering of a cover-up. With this gesture, Bajrami publicly expressed her support for the "Pravda za Davida" movement. The visit attracted public and media attention, sparking discussions about her social and political engagement.

In December 2024, Bajrami publicly expressed support for Serbian students protesting after the Novi Sad railway station canopy collapse, which killed 16 people. The Serbian tabloid Informer, widely considered to be under government influence, portrayed her support as politically motivated, claiming it implied endorsement of the opposition or the idea of "Greater Albania." Bajrami clarified on social media that her support was solely for the students.

In February 2026, Bajrami publicly supported protests organized by students and high school pupils in Sarajevo, following a tragic incident in which Erdoan Morankić lost his life. She praised the young protesters, stating that she increasingly believed young people will save the world.

=== LGBTQ and cultural controversies ===
In early July 2023, after performing at the Dragi Bravo festival at Kalemegdan in front of 10,000 people, Bajrami also performed at the Belgrade gay club Musk. The performance sparked public debate: many praised her support for the LGBTQ community, while others considered it controversial given the conservative context of her usual audience. It was described as one of the rare occasions when a mainstream artist openly performed in an LGBT-specific venue in the region.

On 25 November 2023, a video surfaced of Bajrami performing the wedding song "Valle Kosovare" while making the crossed hands gesture, a symbol of Albanian identity. The video went viral in Serbian media, leading to backlash and criticism from public figures. That video was the reason she was denied entry into Serbia on 22 January 2024, when she landed in Belgrade from Vienna, with authorities citing "security concerns." Shortly afterward, Serbian politician Aleksandar Vulin publicly stated that he personally issued the ban. Bajrami responded on N1, denying any animosity toward the Serbian people and emphasizing that many of her collaborators and friends are Serbian. She clarified that the gesture represented her belonging to the Albanian people, not support for "Greater Albania." Bosnian politician Elmedin Konaković criticized Vulin for issuing bans based on personal or political disagreement. After Konaković's statement defending Bajrami, the situation escalated into a political dispute, and the media outlet N1 published a headline stating, “Selma Bajrami caused a rift in the Bosnian state leadership.”

In August 2024, Croatian singer Severina was also detained by Serbian authorities at the border and questioned over her public statements regarding the Srebrenica genocide. Later, Serbian President Aleksandar Vučić stated that Bajrami and Severina were "haters of the Serbian people," but in the same appearance he added, "let them be," even though both artists were still formally under a ban on entry. Both subsequently stated that they would never go to Serbia while Vučić remained in power.

== Discography ==
Studio albums

- Kad suza ne bude... (1998)
- Ljubav si ubio, gade (1999)
- Revolucija (2001)
- Žena sa Balkana (2002)
- Kakvo tijelo Selma ima (2004)
- Ostrvo tuge (2007)
- Zakon sudbine (2010)
- Selma (2014)
- Embargo (2024)

== Filmography ==
Filmography of Selma Bajrami
Year	Title	Role	Genre	Notes
2003	BH Eurosong	Herself	Television	Placed 6th in the final.
2005	Posao snova	Herself	Documentary	Interviewed.
2008	Zvijezde sa zvijezdama	Herself	Television	Season 2 contestant. Won first place with Kice.
2011	Voli me do bola	Herself	Television	Show focused on finding dancers for her "Voli me do bola" music video.

== Awards and nominations ==
Awards and nominations of Selma Bajrami
Award	Year	Category	Nominee/Work	Result	Ref.
Večernje novine	1999	For the advancement of musical creativity and success in 1998	Herself	Won	
Bečki Oskar popularnosti	2001	Female Singer of the Year	Herself	Won	
BH muzički Oskar	2003	Music Personality of the Year	Herself	Won	
Zlatni mikrofon	2003	Folk Singer of the Year	Herself	Won	
Viktor & Viktorija	2003	Most Listened Singer from Bosnia and Herzegovina	Herself	Won	
MPX	2004	Female Folk Singer of the Year	Herself	Won	
Oskar popularnosti	2005	Bosnia and Herzegovina's Female Folk Singer of the Year	Herself	Won	
NTV 101	2005	Singer of the Year	Herself	Won	
BH muzički Oskar	2005	Female Singer of the Year	Herself	Won	
Oskar popularnosti	2006	Bosnia and Herzegovina's Female Folk Singer of the Year	Herself	Won	
BH muzički Oskar	2007	Female Folk Singer of the Year	Herself	Won	
BH muzički Oskar	2008	Female Folk Singer of the Year	Herself	Won	
BH muzički Oskar	2009	Female Singer of the Year and Female Singer of the Decade	Herself	Won	
NTV 101	2009	Female Folk Singer of the Year	Herself	Won	
Montefolk	2010	Oscar of Popularity	Herself	Won	
Oskar popularnosti	2010	Duet of the Year	"Šta je od Boga, dobro je"	Won	
NTV 101	2010	Female Folk Singer of the Year	Herself	Won	
BH muzički Oskar	2011	Female Singer of the Year and Female Singer of the Decade	Herself	Won	
BH muzički Oskar	2011	Summer Hit	"Voli me do bola"	Won	
Oskar popularnosti	2020	Female Folk Singer of the Year	Herself	Won	
