= Selma =

Selma may refer to:

== People ==
- Selma Bajrami (born 1980), Bosnian singer
  - Selma (album), a 2014 studio album by Selma Bajrami

== Places ==
=== In the United States ===
- Selma, Alabama, city in Dallas County, best known for the Selma to Montgomery marches
- Selma, Arkansas
- Selma, California, city in Fresno County
- Selma, Colorado
- Selma, Indiana, town in Delaware County
- Selma, Iowa
- Selma, Kansas
- Selma, Louisiana
- Selma, Michigan
- Selma, Mississippi
- Selma, Missouri
- Selma, North Carolina, town in Johnston County
- Selma, Ohio
- Selma, Oregon, unincorporated community in Josephine County
- Selma, South Carolina
- Selma, Texas, a city in Bexar, Comal, and Guadalupe counties
- Selma, Virginia
- Selma Township (disambiguation), various places

=== Elsewhere ===
- Selma, Nova Scotia, Canada
- Selma, Switzerland, village in the Grisons

== Historic buildings ==
- Selma Union Depot, a train station and museum in Selma, North Carolina
- Selma (Eastville, Virginia), a plantation house listed on the U.S. National Register of Historic Places (NRHP)
- Selma (Leesburg, Virginia), a mansion and former plantation property
- Selma (Winchester, Virginia), home of Virginia Senator James M. Mason, destroyed by Union troops in 1863. A subsequent more modest home on the same site still uses the name.

== Other uses ==
- Selma (given name)
- Selma (surname)
- Selma (film), a 2014 film based on the Selma to Montgomery marches
- "Selma" (Bijelo Dugme song), 1974
- Selma (gastropod), a genus of sea snails
- Selma (lake monster), in folklore, a sea monster in Seljord, Norway
- Selma to Montgomery marches, three marches that marked the political and emotional peak of the American civil rights movement
- Mount Selma, Victoria, Australia
