= Super Dzvezda =

Children's festival in Republic of North Macedonia

Super Dzvezda is a children's festival in Skopje, Republic of North Macedonia. The first Super Dzvezda festival was held in 1998. The authors of the children's hits include established Macedonian performers, i.e. Kaliopi, Jovan Jovanov and Elvir Mekić.
