= Semir Cerić Koke =

Koke
- Born: Semir Cerić; May 23, 1963 (age 62); Sarajevo, SR Bosnia and Herzegovina, SFR Yugoslavia
- Education: High school of metal professions at Marijin Dvor
- Occupation: singer
- Years active: 1988–present
- Spouse: Ivana Cerić (m. 2019)
- Children: 3
- Musical career
- Genres: folk; turbo-folk; pop-folk
- Instrument: vocals
- Labels: Diskos; In Takt Records; Grand Production; Extra Music; Hayat Production; Sarajevo Disk; BN Music

Semir Cerić (Serbo-Croatian Cyrillic: Семир Церић; born 23 May 1963), better known as Koke (Serbo-Croatian Cyrillic: Коке), is a Bosnian folk singer.

His music style is folk and modern turbofolk.

== Career ==
The beginning of Koke's music career dates from 1988, when he published his debut album – Sanja (for Diskos label). The title song is also notably performed by Serbian folk singer Toma Zdravković, in ekavian form ("Sećaš Li Se Sanja" – 1990).

After cooperation with Diskos, Koke published albums Život Me Je Prevario (1994) and Jednom Se Živi (2001) for In Takt Records. The album Blago Tebi (1999) was released by Sarajevo Disk. The fifth studio album, Koke (2003), was published in Grand Production. Re-release albums Koke (2017) and Blago Tebi (2018) were published for original productions. Koke's sixth studio album, Idemo Dalje (2009), was released by Hayat Production.

Koke has recently recorded three singles with music videos: "Kafanica Laganica" for BN Music in 2017, "Sve I Sad" for Hayat Production in 2019 and "Jednom Se Mora Krenuti Dalje" (self-release) in 2020. Three recent singles without music videos are: "Častit Ću Pola Grada" (2013), "Carski Karavan" (2017) and "Ne, Ne Diraj" (2018).

Koke's evergreen hits are: "Nek' Ti Bude Kao Meni", "Emina" (cover), "Aida", "Sanja", "Glumica", "Zavodnica", "Nevjernica", "Treba Vremena", "Robinja Ili Kraljica", "Vjerovala, Bolovala", "Kad Te Neko Spomene", "Život Me Je Prevario", "Kraj Priče", "Moja Dobra Vilo", "Otkako Je Banjaluka Postala" (interpretation), etc.

Koke gives concerts in Germany, Austria and Switzerland in addition to those in the Western Balkans, as well as USA states (tours) and Australia (tours), – because a large number of Bosnian migrants is present in these countries and they want to hear his songs and remember their past. Koke also usually performs in Eid TV program on Hayat TV during this Muslim holiday.

Koke took part in Grand Diet Plus Festival 2012 and recently Ilidžanski festival 2017 and 2019.

He was one of the members of the jury of music competitions Zvijezda možeš biti ti (abbr. ZMBT; Hayat TV) and Valentino zvijezde (OTV).

== Private life ==
Koke is married to Ivana as of 2019 and has two daughters with his wife (one's name is Emma); he also has one son (Almein). The singer has previously been in a passionate relationship with Željka for over 18 years but had no born children with her nor they ever got married.

Semir Cerić has testified against Zijad Turković (Bosnian criminal boss, sentenced to 40 years) during his trial on 21 December 2011 because Cerić and Turković own Sarajevo-based restaurant "Toskana" – place from which killed people Tolić and Ajdari called their families for the last time; also, Turković admitted attempted murder of Naser Keljmendi and according to one witness' (Kalender) words information on Keljmendi's location Turković got from his wife Šejla Jugo-Turković and singer Semir Cerić Koke who had engagement to sing on Naser's son Elvis Keljmendi's wedding party where assassination attempt achieved by bomb has taken place. It is interesting that Turković wrote lyrics for one Koke's song, "Malo Vina, Malo Pjesme" (A3 on cassette Život Me Je Prevario).

== Discography ==
Studio albums

- Sanja (1988.)
- Život me [je] prevario (1994.)
- Blago tebi (1999.)
- Jednom se živi (2001.)
- Koke (2003.)
- Idemo dalje (2009.)
- Koke (2017; re-release)
- Blago tebi (2018; re-release)

Compilations

- Enes Begović / Koke – Najveći hitovi (2011.)
- Kad kažu ljubav (2016.)

Single

- Suze moje (2021.)

Live

- Dernek-uživo (2006.)

== Festivals ==
- Grand Diet Plus Festival (2012) – "Njen Grad"
- Ilidžanski Festival (2017) – "Sa Igmana Pogledat' Je Lijepo", "Kraj Bentbaše"
- Ilidžanski Festival (2019) – "Oj, Safete, Sajo, Sarajlijo", "Treba Vremena", "Kafanica Laganica", etc.
