= Cijeli moj svijet =

Cijeli moj svijet My Whole World

Studio album by Denial Ahmetović
- Released: 23 May 2014
- Recorded: 2013–14
- Genre: pop; ballad

Singles from Cijeli moj svijet
- 1. "Nema ljubavi dok je Bosna ne rodi" Released: 19 April 2013; 2. "Cijeli moj svijet" Released: 19 July 2013; 3. "Nema vremena za tugu" Released: 22 November 2013

Cijeli moj svijet (English: My Whole World) is the debut studio album by Bosnian pop singer and Zvijezda možeš biti ti Season 5 winner Denial Ahmetović. It was released 23 May 2014 through Hayat Production.

== Background ==
In 2012 Ahmetović auditioned for the fifth season of the televised Bosnian singing contest Zvijezda možeš biti ti on Hayat TV. He became the winner on 12 April 2013.

== Singles ==
The album's lead single "Nema ljubavi dok je Bosna ne rodi" was released 19 April 2013. The lyrics were written by Marina Tucaković and Miligram musician Aleksandar Milić, with music also by Milić.

The second single "Cijeli moj svijet", written by Eldin Huseinbegović, premiered 19 July 2013.

== Release and artwork ==
Cijeli moj svijet was released 23 May 2014 through the record label Hayat Production. The cover photo was shot by Jasmin Fazlagić.

== Track listing ==
No.	Title	Writer(s)	Length
1.	"Nema ljubavi dok je Bosna ne rodi" (There Is No Love Until Bosnia Births Her)	Marina Tucaković; Aleksandar Milić	4:01
2.	"Učini nešto" (Do Something)	Zaim Poturić; Kenan Dedić	4:16
3.	"Lažna svetice" (Fake Saint)	Marinko Novčić; Arel Češljar	3:29
4.	"Nema vremena za tugu" (No Time For Sadness)	Amil Lojo	3:52
5.	"Cijeli moj svijet" (My Whole World)	Eldin Huseinbegović; Nihad Krečo	4:30
6.	"Zabranjeno pušenje" (No Smoking)	Aldin Kurić	4:04
7.	"Diži na noge sve" (Get Everyone On Their Feet)	Aldin Kurić	3:06
8.	"Zašto život lijepim zovu" (Why Do They Call Life Beautiful)	Armin Šaković; Nihad Voloder	3:52
