= Miraz (album) =

Miraz Dowry

Studio album by Elvira Rahić
- Released: 14 February 2008
- Genre: pop folk
- Producer: Muhamed Šehić Hamić

Elvira Rahić chronology
Hotel "Čekanje" (2005)	Miraz; Dowry (2008)	Cura sa čaršije (2011)

Miraz (Dowry) is the ninth studio album by Bosnian pop-folk singer Elvira Rahić. It was released 14 February 2008 through Hayat Production.

== Title ==
When asked why the album was called Miraz (Dowry), she replied "There's nothing autobiographical. Dowry is the dream of every girl and pride of all parents. We are only trying to bring something new to the scene."

== Track listing ==
No.	Title	Writer(s)	Length
1.	"Bijela zastava" (White Flag)	Dino Muharemović; V. Begić; Elvira Rahić; Muhamed Šehić Hamić	3:34
2.	"Miraz" (Dowry)	Elvira Rahić; Muhamed Šehić Hamić	3:07
3.	"Ožiljak na srcu" (Scar on My Heart)	Jasmina Jovanović; Muhamed Šehić Hamić	3:36
4.	"Nikad više" (Never Again)	V. Begić; Elvira Rahić; Muhamed Šehić Hamić	3:23
5.	"Nisam znala" (I Didn't Know)	Elvira Rahić; Muhamed Šehić Hamić	3:21
6.	"Blago meni" (Lucky Me)	Dino Muharemović	3:27
7.	"Idem" (I'm Going)	Dino Muharemović; Elvira Rahić; Muhamed Šehić Hamić	3:01
8.	"Sanjam" (I'm Dreaming)	Samir Mujagić	4:26
9.	"Vikend" (Weekend)	Fahrudin Pecikoza; Muhamed Šehić Hamić	2:57
10.	"Ne volim te" (I Don't Love You)	Željko Stjepanović	3:54

Bonus tracks
No.	Title	Writer(s)	Length
11.	"Legendi Sevdaha" (To a Legend of Sevdah)	Semka Torlak; Eldin Huseinbegović	3:36
12.	"Bivši moj" (My Ex)	M. Kečup - Kečo; Muhamed Šehić Hamić	3:11

== Personnel ==
=== Instruments ===
- Muhamed Šehić Hamić – keyboards, accordion
- Mustafa Behmen – bouzouki
- M. Asotić – guitar
- Emir Hot – guitar
- Samir Mujagić – guitar (8)
- Ado Busuladžić – saxophone, clarinet

=== Production and recording ===
- Muhamed Šehić Hamić – arrangement (1, 2, 3, 4, 5, 6, 7, 9, 10, 11, 12), mastering, mixing, programming
- J. Draganović – programming
