= Revolucija =

Revolucija means "revolution" in Serbo-Croatian.

Revolucija may also refer to:

- Revolucija (album), a studio album by Bosnian pop-folk singer Selma Bajrami
- Revolucija (TV series), a 2013–2015 Serbian satirical television series hosted by Serbian-Canadian filmmaker Boris Malagurski
