= Odiseja =

- 7" single cover

Single by Leo Martin
- B-side: "Svet bez tebe"
- Released: 1973
- Recorded: 1973
- Genre: Schlager
- Label: PGP RTB
- Composer: Vojkan Borisavljević
- Lyricist: Svetislav Vuković

"Odiseja" (Serbo-Croatian for Odyssey) is a schlager song recorded by Serbian-Yugoslavian singer Leo Martin in 1973. The song was first performed by Dalibor Brun at the 1973 Opatija festival, where it was ranked 7th in the finals. Martin released "Odiseja" as a 7" single and it was later included in his 1974 album also titled Odiseja. It became Martin's signature song, and a huge hit in Yugoslavia. The single sold 100,000 copies in the first week.

The song was composed by Vojislav Borisavljević with lyrics by Svetislav Vuković.
