= Mlađe slađe =

Single by Enela featuring Selma Bajrami

from the album Embargo
- Released: 9 October 2015
- Recorded: Belgrade
- Genre: Pop folk
- Length: 3:20
- Label: IDJTunes
- Songwriter: Siniša Ličina
- Producers: Marko Drežnjak; Nikola Bardak

Selma Bajrami singles chronology
"Samo tvoje oči" (2014)	"Mlađe slađe" (2015)	"Zvjerka" (2016)

"Mlađe slađe" ("Younger, Sweeter") is a song recorded by Bosnian American artist Enela Palavra featuring Bosnian pop recording artist Selma Bajrami. It was released on 9 October 2015 as a non-album single; it was later included on Bajrami's 2024 studio album Embargo.

The music video was produced by the label IDJTunes and released along with the song.
