= Selma Township =

Selma Township may refer to the following places in the United States:

- Selma Township, Michigan
- Selma Township, Cottonwood County, Minnesota
- Selma Township, Johnston County, North Carolina

See also

- Selma (disambiguation)
