= Zakon sudbine =

- Cover of the CD released by Grand production.

Studio album by Selma Bajrami
- Released: 2 June 2010
- Recorded: 2008–2010: Belgrade; Ljubljana
- Studio: XXL, Red Green
- Genre: pop; folk; pop-folk; rap
- Length: 52:39
- Language: Bosnian
- Label: Grand Production, SB Music
- Producer: Dejan Abadić

Selma Bajrami chronology
Ostrvo tuge (2007)	Zakon sudbine (2010)	Selma Bajrami (2014)

Singles from Zakon sudbine
- 1. "Đavolica" Released: 20 June 2009; 2. "Farmerice" Released: 14 July 2009

Zakon sudbine (Bosnian for 'The Law of Fate') is the seventh studio album by Bosnian pop-folk singer Selma Bajrami. It was released through Grand Production in June 2010.

== Background ==
Bajrami began work on her seventh studio album in 2008. She teamed up with songwriters Miralem Osmić, Marina Tucaković and Dragan Brajović, as well as producer Dejan Abadić.

== Singles ==
The first two singles Đavolica ("She-Devil"), with Bosnian rapper Deda, and "Farmerice" ("Jeans") were released in June and July 2009.

One of the album's singles was the duet "Što je od Boga dobro je" ("What's from God Is Good") with Macedonian singer Elvir Mekić who also co-wrote the lyrics. In March 2010 the song won the "Oskar" for best duet in Banja Luka.

== Reality show ==
A reality show in which Selma searches for dancers to appear in the music video for her single Voli me do bola went into production in 2010 and began airing on Hayat TV in spring of 2011.

== Track listing ==
Serbian CD edition
No.	Title	Lyrics	Music	Arrangement	Length
1.	"Voli me do bola"	Dragan "Braja" Brajović	Brajović	Dejan Abadić	3:39
2.	"Zakon sudbine"	Dragiša Baša	Baša	Vuk Zirojević	3:32
3.	"Bakšiš"	Brajović	Brajović	Abadić	3:55
4.	"Nije zlato sve što sija"	Brajović	Brajović	Abadić	4:31
5.	"Rukujmo se kao prijatelji"	Baša	Baša	Zirojević	3:28
6.	"Sarajevo"	Marina Tucaković	Miralem Osmić	Abadić	3:34
7.	"Sretna bez ljubavi"	Baša	Baša	Zirojević	4:22
8.	"Farmerice"	Tucaković	Osmić	Aleksandar Kobac	3:56
9.	"Tvoj dodir"	Baša	Baša	Zirojević	3:31
10.	"Svaki minut bitan je"	Baša	Baša	Abadić	3:53
11.	"Nemoj da se šališ"	Selma Bajrami	Bajrami	Osmić	3:05
12.	"Pamtim"	Tucaković	Osmić	Osmić	3:44
13.	"Đavolica" (featuring Denis Kurdija Deda)	Dejan Mitrović	Osmić	Mitrović	3:48
14.	"Što je od Boga dobro je" (featuring Elvir Mekić)	Mekić	Jovan Jovanov	Jovanov	3:55

Bosnian CD edition bonus tracks
No.	Title	Lyrics	Music	Arrangement	Length
15.	"Kakvo tijelo Selma ima"	Brajović	Brajović	Abadić	3:01
16.	"Tijelo uz tijelo"	Brajović	Brajović	Abadić	4:01
17.	"Žalim"	Brajović	Brajović	Abadić	3:34
18.	"Muška suza"	Brajović	Brajović	Abadić	4:09
19.	"Kad iza sebe pogledam"	Brajović	Brajović	Abadić	3:45
20.	"Ljubavi jedina"	Bajrami	Dragomir Herendić	Herendić	3:10
21.	"Prva ljubav"	Bajrami	Amir "Nanin" Alić	Herendić	3:08

Notes

- Bosnian edition bonus tracks are taken from Bajrami's 2004 studio album Kakvo tijelo Selma ima.

== Personnel ==
=== Musicians ===
- Dragan Paunović – accordion (1, 3, 4, 6, 10)
- Ivana Selakov – backing vocals (1, 2, 3, 4, 5, 6, 7, 9, 10)
- Petar Trumbetaš – bouzouki (1, 3, 4, 6, 9), guitar (1, 2, 3, 4, 5, 6, 9)
- Bane Kljajić – guitar (7, 10)
- Edin Zulović – keyboards (2, 5, 7, 9)
- Dejan Abadić – keyboards (1, 3, 4, 6, 10)
- Vuk Zirojević – keyboards (2, 5, 7, 9)
- Miloš Nikolić – trumpet (7)

=== Production and recording ===
- Dejan Abadić – production (1, 3, 4, 6, 10)
- Vuk Zirojević – programming (2, 5, 7, 9), recording and mixing (1, 2, 3, 4, 5, 6, 7, 9, 10)
- Đole Petrović – programming (1, 3, 4, 6, 10)
