= Mramor, Tuzla =

Mramor
- Location within Bosnia and Herzegovina
- Coordinates: 44°31′56″N 18°48′22″E
- Country: Bosnia and Herzegovina
- Entity: Federation of Bosnia and Herzegovina
- Canton: Tuzla
- Municipality: Tuzla

Area
  - Total: 2.13 sq mi (5.51 km^{2})

Population (2013)
  - Total: 188
  - Density: 88.4/sq mi (34.1/km^{2})
- Time zone: UTC+1 (CET)
  - Summer (DST): UTC+2 (CEST)

Mramor is a village in the municipality of Tuzla, Tuzla Canton, Bosnia and Herzegovina. It is located between Tuzla and Srebrenik.

It was the location of the 1990 Dobrnja-Jug mine disaster, where 180 miners died.

== Demographics ==
According to the 2013 census, its population was 188.

Ethnicity in 2013
Ethnicity	Number	Percentage
Croats	113	60.1%
Bosniaks	62	33.0%
Serbs	8	4.3%
other/undeclared	5	2.7%
Total	188	100%

== Notable people ==
- Zoran Tomić (1958–1989), footballer
- Selma Bajrami (born 1980), singer
