= Cura sa čaršije =

Cura sa čaršije Girl from the Čaršija

Studio album by Elvira Rahić
- Released: 11 April 2011
- Genre: pop folk
- Producer: Mirko Šenkovski "Geronimo"

Elvira Rahić chronology
Miraz (2008)	Cura sa čaršije Girl from the Čaršija (2011)

Cura sa čaršije (English: Girl from the Čaršija) is the tenth studio album by Bosnian pop-folk singer Elvira Rahić. It was released 11 April 2011 through Hayat Production.

== Background ==
Rahić recorded a duet with friend and colleague Enes Begović called "Dođi na godinu" for the album. A "new style" accompanied the album, different from Rahić's previous work.

== Release ==
Cura sa čaršije was released by Hayat Production on 11 April 2011. A "promotional party" was held at Sarajevo's hotel Bristol 30 May 2011. Also the help promote Cura sa čaršije, Rahić embarked on a tour of the same name.

== Track listing ==
No.	Title	Writer(s)	Length
1.	"1001"	Mirko Šenkovski "Geronimo"
2.	"Cura sa čaršije" (Girl from the Čaršija)	Mirko Šenkovski "Geronimo"
3.	"Udajem se" (I'm Getting Married)	Mirko Šenkovski "Geronimo"
4.	"Bosanac (featuring DJ Deny)" (Bosnian Man)	Mirko Šenkovski "Geronimo"
5.	"Ne traži to od mene" (Don't Look for That From Me)	Dragan Brajović; Dejan Abadić
6.	"Nestani" (Disappear)	Nardin Mašić; Amil Lojo
7.	"U nedjelji jedan dan" (One Day a Week)	Dragan Milanović Meddo; Damir Handanović
8.	"Najljepši cvijet" (The Most Beautiful Flower)	Mirko Šenkovski "Geronimo"
9.	"Super Mama"	Mirko Šenkovski "Geronimo"
10.	"Matura" (Graduation)	Mirko Šenkovski "Geronimo"
11.	"Što da pravam" (Why Do I Have to Defend Myself)	Macedonian traditional folk song; Mirko Šenkovski "Geronimo"; Muris Hubjer
12.	"Dođi na godinu (featuring Enes Begović)" (Come in a Year)	Kenan Dedić; Zaim Poturić

== Personnel ==
=== Instruments ===
- Igor Gregurić – accordion
- Kenan Dedić – accordion, piano
- Demira Pašalić – backing vocals
- Elma Selimović – backing vocals
- Mensura Bajraktarević – backing vocals
- Mirko Šenkovski "Geronimo" – backing vocals
- Edvin Hodžić – bass guitar
- Muris Hubjer – drums
- Almir Hukelić – guitar
- Muris Varajić – guitar
- Vernes Ljuštaku – guitar

=== Production and recording ===
- Marin Meštrović – mixing, mastering

=== Crew ===
- Ado Karišik – styling (make-up, hair)
- Jasmin Fazlagić – photography
