= Zoran Tomić (footballer) =

Yugoslavian footballer

Personal information
- Full name: Zoran Tomić
- Date of birth: 24 October 1958
- Place of birth: Mramor, FPR Yugoslavia
- Date of death: 14 June 1989 (aged 30)
- Place of death: Malatya, Turkey
- Position: Midfielder

Youth career
- 1975-1977: Mramor

Senior career*
Years	Team	Apps	(Gls)
1977–1986	Sloboda Tuzla	164	(24)
1986–1988	Orduspor		
1988–1989	Samsunspor	16	(0)
Total		180	(24)
- * Club domestic league appearances and goals

Zoran Tomić (24 October 1958 – 14 June 1989) was a Bosnian football midfielder who played for clubs in Yugoslavia and Turkey.

== Career ==
Born in Mramor, Tomić played with FK Sloboda Tuzla in the Yugoslav First League during his nine seasons with the club.

Tomić signed with Turkish second division side Orduspor for two seasons in 1986. He moved to Süper Lig side Samsunspor in 1988, where he would make 16 league appearances before his death.

== Personal ==
The Samsunspor team bus was involved in a traffic accident on the way to a match in Malatya on 20 January 1989, killing the team coach, two players and the bus driver instantly. Tomić went into a coma and died six months later. After the accident, Samsunspor added the color of "black" their official club colors.
