= Kad suza ne bude... =

Kad suza ne bude... (When There Are No More Tears...)

Studio album by Selma Bajrami
- Released: 1998
- Recorded: 1997–98: Studio Time, Belgrade
- Genre: Folk
- Label: Nimfa Sound
- Producer: Milić Vukašinović; Siniša Radović; Mirko Pavić (executive producer)

Selma Bajrami chronology
Kad suza ne bude... (When There Are No More Tears...) (1998)	Ljubav si ubio gade (1999)

Kad suza ne bude... (English: When There Are No More Tears...) is the debut studio album by Bosnian pop-folk singer Selma Bajrami. It was released through the production company Nimfa Sound in 1998.

== Background ==
Bajrami first began singing in kafanas c. 1994. She was signed to the label Nimfa Sound and recorded her first album while still a teenager. The album was recorded in Belgrade and was, for the most part, written and composed by Milić Vukašinović.

== Track listing ==
No.	Title	Writer(s)	Length
1.	"Ne ljubi me" (Don't Kiss Me)	Milić Vukašinović	3:06
2.	"Šta će žena ta" (Why Do You Need That Woman)	Miodrag Ž. Ilić; Mirko Pavić; Rade Krstić	2:51
3.	"Zašto boli kad se voli" (Why Does It Hurt When You Love)	Miodrag Ž. Ilić; Mirko Pavić; Mića Nikolić	3:09
4.	"Kad suza jednom ne bude" (When There Are No More Tears)	Mirko Pavić; Milić Vukašinović	3:23
5.	"Nije moja majka kriva" (It's Not my Mothers Fault)	Naser Bajrami	3:15
6.	"Da li da se kajem" (Do I Need to Repent)	Naser Bajrami	3:39
7.	"Moj si samo kad ti trebam" (You're Only Mine When You Need Me)	Milić Vukašinović	2:52
8.	"Želje moje, pusti snovi" (My Desires, Empty Dreams)	Naser Bajrami	2:58
9.	"Njemu osmijeh, meni suze" (For Him a Smile, For Me Tears)	Milić Vukašinović	2:48
10.	"I ja lutam i ja patim" (And I Wander and I Suffer)	Naser Bajrami	3:02
11.	"Hoće dragi da me ženi" (My Dear Wants to Marry Me)	Milić Vukašinović	3:07
12.	"Sviće dan" (The Day Will Dawn)	Milić Vukašinović; Goran Bregović	4:03

== Personnel ==
=== Instruments ===
- Milić Vukašinović – guitar
- Slavko Kuzmanović – keyboards, accordion

=== Production and recording ===
- Milić Vukašinović – arrangement, producing
- Rade Ercegovac – mixing
- Siniša Radović – producing
- Mirko Pavić – executive producing
