= Elvira Rahić =

Bosnian pop-folk singer (born 1973)

- Born: 1 September 1973 (age 52); Skopje, SR Macedonia, SFR Yugoslavia
- Occupation: Singer
- Years active: 1991–present
- Spouse: Šaban Forić (m. 2008)
- Children: 1
- Musical career
- Genres: pop folk; folk; pop
- Instrument: Vocal
- Labels: Inter Orkan; In Takt Records; Hayat Production; Gold Audio Video

Elvira Rahić (born 1 September 1973) is a Bosnian pop-folk singer. Rahić began her professional music career in 1991 and has since released ten studio albums. She lives in Sarajevo and Vienna.

== Personal life ==
Rahić is married to Šaban Forić and together they have a son. She and her husband are practicing islam. The couple lived in Sarajevo before moving to Berlin in 2007 when Forić became employed at the Embassy of Bosnia and Herzegovina in Berlin. Forić was relocated to the Bosnian embassy in Vienna in November 2011.

== Discography ==
- Ekstra folk hit (1991)
- Želim te (1992)
- Želim ti sreću (1994)
- Sada znam (1995)
- Šta ako se zaljubim (1997)
- Izbriši sve uspomene (1999)
- Ljubav gospodine (2001)
- Hotel „Čekanje” (2005)
- Miraz (2008)
- Cura sa čaršije (2011)

Singles

- "A sada idem" / "Baraba" (1994) /ft. Mladen Vojičić/
- "Na tugu bi' pristala" (1996)
- "Putnik" (2012)
- "Legendi sevdaha" (2014)
- "Ne odustajem" (2014)
- "Fobija" (2014)
- "Igračka" (2022)

== See also ==
- Šerif Konjević
- Enes Begović
