= Zvjerka =

Single by Selma Bajrami

from the album Embargo
- Released: 9 May 2016
- Genre: Pop folk
- Length: 3:55
- Label: Self-released

Selma Bajrami singles chronology
"Mlađe slađe" (2015)	"Zvjerka" (2016)	"Uzbuna" (2016)

"Zvjerka" (lit. ''she-beast'') is a song recorded by Bosnian pop recording artist Selma Bajrami. It was released on 9 May 2016 as a single for her planned ninth studio album Embargo (released in 2024).

The music video, filmed in Mostar, was released on YouTube on 15 June 2016.
