= Kuge (Srebrenik) =

- Village
- Location within Bosnia and Herzegovina
- Coordinates: 44°40′N 18°33′E
- Country: Bosnia and Herzegovina
- Entity: Federation of Bosnia and Herzegovina
- Canton: Tuzla
- Municipality: Srebrenik

Area
  - Total: 2.14 sq mi (5.54 km^{2})

Population (2013)
  - Total: 430
  - Density: 200/sq mi (78/km^{2})

Kuge is a village in the municipality of Srebrenik, Bosnia and Herzegovina.

== Demographics ==
According to the 2013 census, its population was 430.

Ethnicity in 2013
Ethnicity	Number	Percentage
Bosniaks	422	98.1%
Croats	1	0.2%
other/undeclared	7	1.6%
Total	430	100%
