= Denial Ahmetović =

Bosnian pop singer (born 1995)

- Born: 26 February 1995; Zenica, Republic of Bosnia and Herzegovina
- Occupation: Singer
- Years active: 2012–present
- Musical career
- Genres: Pop
- Instrument: Vocals

Denial Ahmetović (born 26 February 1995) is a Bosnian pop singer. He was the winner of the fifth season of the televised singing contest Zvijezda možeš biti ti (You Can Be a Star) on Hayat TV.

== Early life ==
Denial Ahmetović was born in Zenica, Bosnia and Herzegovina, during the Bosnian War. His first name is a version of "Daniel". His father is Vehid Ahmetović and his mother's name is Adisa. Ahmetović has a sister named Aldijana. The Ahmetović family later relocated to Kakanj.

== Zvijezda možeš biti ti 5 and Cijeli moj svijet ==
In 2012 Ahmetović auditioned for the fifth season of the televised Bosnian singing contest Zvijezda možeš biti ti on Hayat TV. He became the winner on 12 April 2013.

Only one week after winning the contest, Ahmetović released his first single, "Nema ljubavi dok je Bosna ne rodi", on 19 April 2013. It was written by Marina Tucaković and Miligram musician Aleksandar Milić. His second song, "Cijeli moj svijet", written by Eldin Huseinbegović, was premiered 19 July 2013. His debut studio album Cijeli moj svijet was released on 23 May 2014.

== Personal life ==
Ahmetović was involved in a minor car crash on 31 December 2014 on the road to a New Year's Eve concert in Maglaj.

== Discography ==
- Cijeli moj svijet (2014)
