= Leo Martin =

Serbian musical artist (born 1942)

Leo Martin Милош Јовић
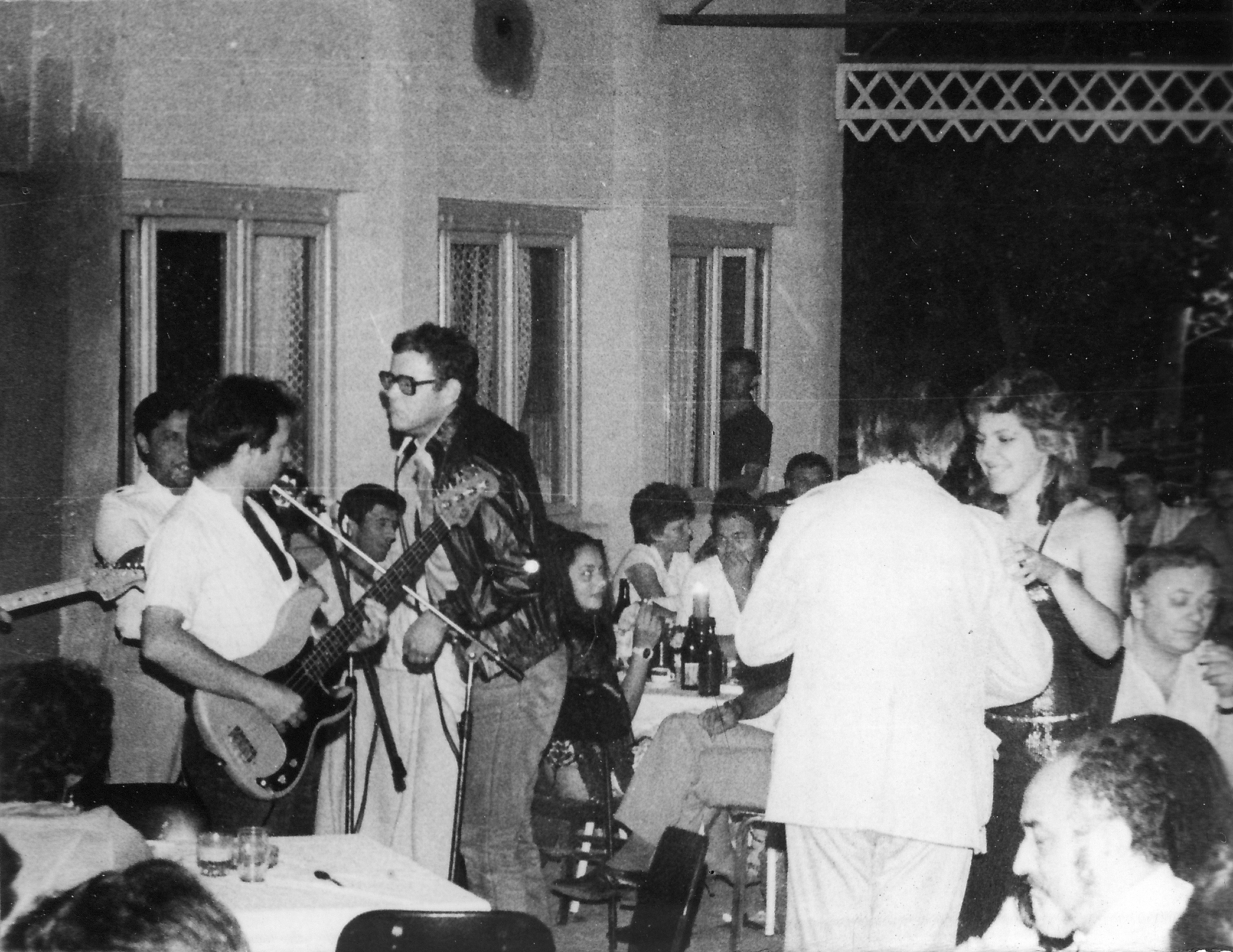
- Leo Martin performing in Niš during the early 1980s.

Background information
- Also known as: Leo Martin
- Born: Miloš Jović; March 6, 1942 (age 84); Rašica, German-occupied Serbia
- Genres: disco, pop, schlager
- Occupations: Singer, model
- Years active: 1959–present
- Labels: CBS Records, PGP-RTB

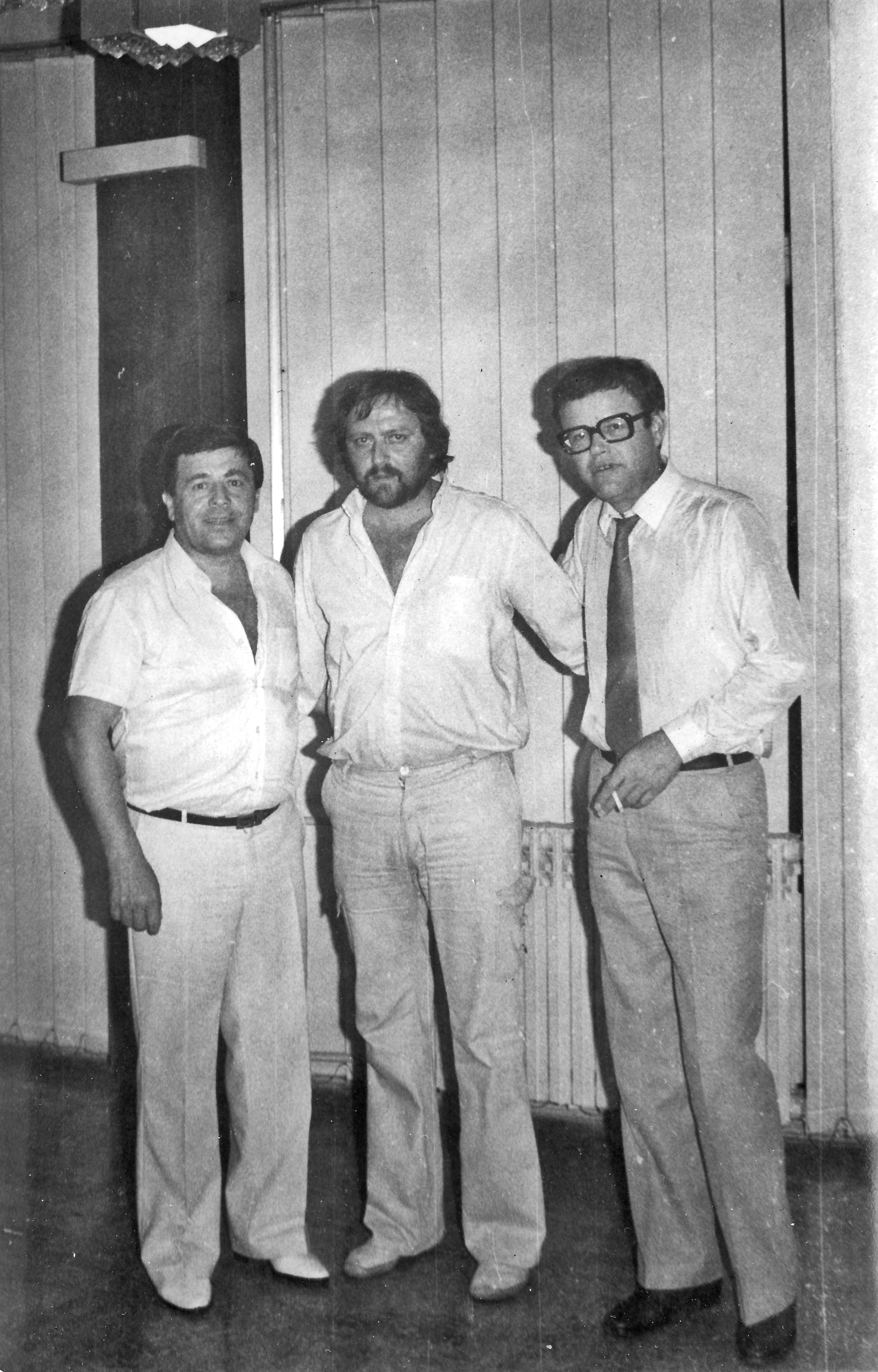
Martin (right) with Meho Puzić (left) in Niš, early 1980s.

Leo Martin (Serbian Cyrillic: Лео Мартин, born on 6 March 1942) is a Serbian and former Yugoslav pop singer. He started his career in the early 1960s in jazz bands as an instrumentalist and vocalist. In 1964, he moved with his band to West Germany to play jazz covers in night clubs. In 1968, while in Germany, he started his solo career by recording an album of pop music in the English language, which made him popular throughout Europe. After touring Europe, he returned to Yugoslavia in 1969 where he established himself as one of the leading schlager singers of the 1970s and 1980s. His career was interrupted by Yugoslav Wars of the 1990s. He has performed sporadically since.

== Biography ==
Martin was born Miloš Jović (Милош Јовић) on 6 March 1942 in the village of Rašica near Blace, Serbia. When he was two years old, his family moved to Belgrade. His family was poor, so he had to work hard since the young age. Jović was loading coal in the building of the Music Academy in Belgrade when he heard classical music. That led him to his musical career. He enrolled at the musical school, studying piano and clarinet. In 1961, he enrolled at the Faculty of Law of the University of Belgrade, but did not graduate.

=== Music career ===
In early 60s, Jović formed a dixieland band called "Veseli bendžo" (Serbian for 'Happy Banjo') that played jazz covers in Belgrade clubs. They played every Thursday evening at Belgrade Fair. Jović played clarinet in the band. The band became popular, but was soon disbanded, and he formed new band called "Ekspres 8" in which he was the vocalist and played covers of Ray Charles and Glenn Miller. In 1964, the band moved to West Germany where they played for U.S. soldiers stationed there. In 1967, while playing in Munich, Jović was visited by CBS Records general manager Bruno Anger, who offered him a contract to record an album of his own songs in English. For that contract, Јović took alias Leo Martin, which he used throughout all his later career. His debut album Let me stay was a hit in Europe in early 1968. He toured Europe together with Mireille Mathieu, Tom Jones, Engelbert Humperdinck and Salvatore Adamo. In February 1969, he returned to Yugoslavia.

During the 70s and 80s, Martin established himself as one of the leading Yugoslavian schlager music singer. In 1973, he recorded his signature song "Odiseja" ('Odyssey') for PGP-RTB record label. The single sold 100,000 copies in its first week.

During the Yugoslav Wars of the 90's, Martin took a break in his music career. He did not make any recordings or perform in a concert between 1990 and 1997. In 1997, PGP-RTS released his greatest hits album titled Pesme mog života ('Songs of My Life') which sold well.

== Sources ==
- L., T. (5 February 2011). "Leo Martin: Godine mi ništa ne mogu" [Leo Martin: Age Can't Harm Me]. Večernje Novosti (in Serbian).
- Adžić, M. (24 June 2014). "Leo Martin: Penzija nije za umetnike" [Leo Martin: Retirement Is Not for an Artist]. Večernje Novosti (in Serbian).
