= Selma (surname) =

Selma is a surname. Notable people with the surname include:

- Bartolomé de Selma y Salaverde (c. 1595 – after 1638), Spanish composer and dulcian player
- Dani Selma (Daniel Selma Mercader; born 2001), Spanish footballer
- Dick Selma (1943–2001), American baseball player
- Fernando Selma (1752–1810), Spanish engraver and illustrator
- Jaume Padrós i Selma (born 1959), Catalan physician and politician
- Mai Selma (11th century), last Duguwa king of the Kanem Empire
- Teresa Selma (born 1930), Venezuelan actress
