= Eldin Huseinbegović =

Bosnian singer-songwriter

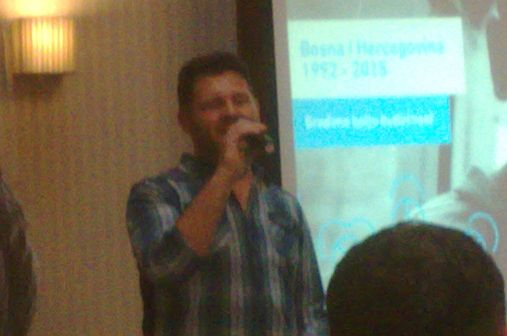

Background information
- Born: 4 July 1978 (age 47); Sarajevo, Bosnia and Herzegovina, Yugoslavia
- Genres: pop · sevdalinka
- Occupation: Singer-songwriter
- Instruments: Vocals, guitar
- Years active: 1992–present
- Labels: Džaan
- Website: http://www.eldinhuseinbegovic.com

Eldin Huseinbegović (Serbo-Croatian Cyrillic: Елдин Хусеинбеговић; born 4 July 1978) is a Bosnian singer-songwriter. He has recorded songs with Dino Merlin and Hari Mata Hari.

== Biography ==
Since 2002 he has worked as a tenor at the Opera Narodnog Pozorišta (National Theatre Opera) in Sarajevo and participated in a large number of operas and concerts (La Traviata, Le nozze di Figaro, Nabuko, Hasanaginica, Ero S’Onog Svijeta, Requiem (Mozart), Requiem (Verdi), Tosca, Die Fledermaus, L'elisir d'amore, Zrinjski).

In 2007 and 2008 he took part in the "BiH Radijsko-Televizijski Festival" (B&H Radio-Television Festival) and both times won the prize for best interpretation. In 2009 he was awarded "Isa-beg Ishaković" award for his contribution to the cultural and musical heritage of B&H. In 2010 he was awarded "Etno-pop pjevač godine u BiH" (Ethno-pop singer in B&H). His album Kaldrma (2010) is an autobiographical work and was a gift to his wife, Emka.

Eldin is the owner of musical studio "Džaan" (1999). He is also a member of the "Balkanska Muzička Akademija" (Balkan Music Academy; 30 January 2010) composed of the best authors and producers from the Balkans. He has written over 100 songs.

As a songwriter he intensively cooperates with the biggest musical names in the region (Dino Merlin, Hari Mata Hari, Marija Šerifović, Elvira Rahić, Enes Begović, Osman Hadžić, Dženan Lončarević, Jelena Tomašević).

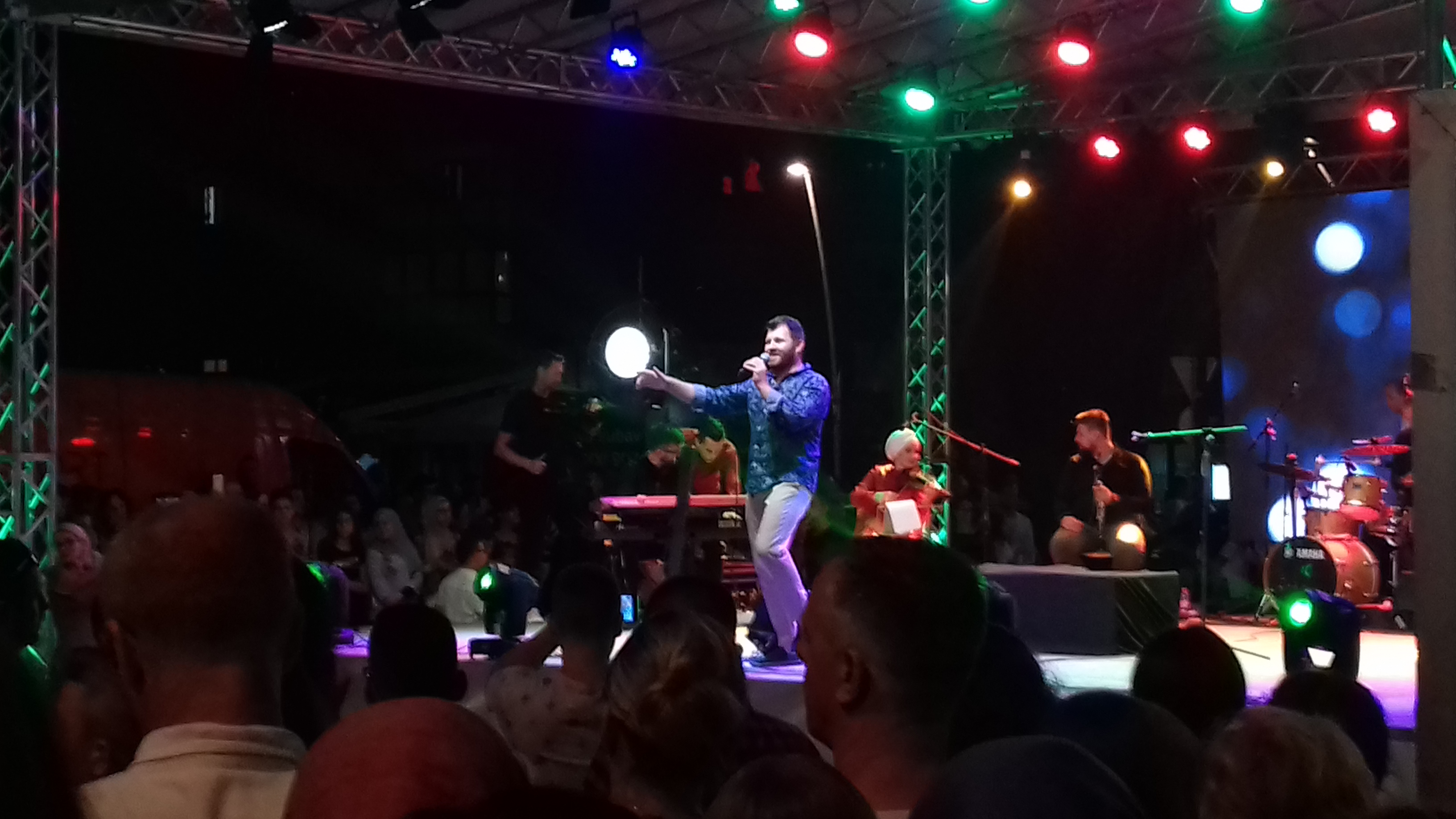
Huseinbegović singing on Eid solemnity 2019 in Zenica

On 12 August 2019 (2nd day of Eid al-Adha 2019), Huseinbegović was Armin Muzaferija's guest on Zenica city-square concert entitled "Eid solemnity" (Bajramska svečanost / Бајрамска свечаност). p

== Discography ==
Studio albums

- Kaldrma (Street, 2010)

Singles

- Poslije tebe (After You, 2007)
- Tako bih rado (I Wish So, 2008)
- Strijela sudbine (Arrow of Destiny, 2009)

As featured artist

- Da šutiš (To Be Quiet, 2008) with Dino Merlin
- Tvoje je samo to što daš (Only What You Give Is Yours, 2009) with Hari Mata Hari
- Djula (2022) with Orkestar Aleksandar Sofronijević
