= Ljubav si ubio gade =

Ljubav si ubio, gade

Studio album by Selma Bajrami
- Released: December 1999
- Recorded: Sarajevo; Belgrade; Lukavac; Duisburg
- Genre: Folk
- Label: Nimfa Sound
- Producer: Samir Mujagić, Armin Šaković, Džavid Ljubovci, Mića Nikolić, Milić Vukašinović, Edvin Milić Edo, Siniša Radović, Džemo Novaković

Selma Bajrami chronology
Kad suza ne bude... (1998)	Ljubav si ubio, gade (1999)	Revolucija (2001)

Ljubav si ubio, gade (You've Killed Love, You Scum) is the second studio album by Bosnian pop-folk singer Selma Bajrami. It was released in December 1999 through the record label Nimfa Sound.

== Track listing ==
No.	Title	Lyrics	Producer(s)	Length
1.	"Pijanico (Drunkard)"	Zijad Hurić Zike		4:04
2.	"Život liječi rane (Life Heals Wounds)"	Edvin Milić Edo		3:43
3.	"Ko je kome ostao dužan (Who is in Debt to Whom?)"	Zeko Halilović	Milić Vukašinović	2:36
4.	"Mrva hljeba (Crumb of Bread)"	Samir Mujagić	Samir Mujagić	4:04
5.	"Ljubav si ubio, gade (You've Killed Love, You Scum)"	Mirko Pavić, Edvin Milić Edo	Edvin Milić Edo	3:18
6.	"I Bog je sa nama (And God is With Us)"	Milić Vukašinović	Siniša Radović	2:35
7.	"Nikada od tebe čovjeka (There'll Never Be a Man Out of You)"	Dino Merlin	Džavid Ljubovci	3:38
8.	"Moj golube (My Dove)"	Samir Mujagić	Samir Mujagić	3:20
9.	"Iz ljubavi je (It's Out of Love)"	Armin Šaković	Armin Šaković, Samir Mujagić	3:15
10.	"Ti ne vidiš razlike (You Don't See a Difference)"	Džemo Novaković	Mirko Pavić	3:35
11.	"Daleko od oćiju, daleko od srca (Far from my Eyes, Far from my Heart)"	Mirko Pavić, Dilvad Felić Dado	Džavid Ljubovci	3:10
12.	"Lutkica (Dolly)"	Mića Nikolić	Milić Vukašinović	4:00
