= Ostrvo tuge =

Studio album by Selma Bajrami
- Released: 25 April 2007
- Recorded: 2006–07: Studio XXL, Belgrade
- Genre: pop folk
- Label: Grand Production
- Producer: Dejan Abadić

Selma Bajrami chronology
Kakvo tijelo Selma ima (2004)	Ostrvo tuge (2007)	Zakon sudbine (2010)

Singles from Ostrvo tuge
- 1. "Lijepe žene" Released: 2 September 2006; 2. "Promjeni se" Released: 22 January 2007; 3. "Kad se ne da, ne da se" Released: 28 February 2007; 4. "Korak do nervnog sloma" Released: 17 April 2007; 5. "Ostrvo tuge" Released: 2 June 2007

Ostrvo tuge (The Island of Sorrow) is the sixth studio album by Bosnian pop-folk singer Selma Bajrami. It was released through Grand Production in 2007.

== Background ==
Bajrami began recording her sixth album as early as June 2006 with producer Aleksandar 'Futa' Radulović, but later switched producers and teamed with Dejan Abadić.

== Track listing ==
No.	Title	Writer(s)	Producer(s)	Length
1.	"Ostrvo tuge" (The Island of Sorrow)	Dragan Brajović	Dejan Abadić	4:04
2.	"Promjeni se" (Change Yourself)	Dragan Brajović	Dejan Abadić	3:51
3.	"Korak do nervnog sloma" (One Step from a Nervous Breakdown)	Dragan Brajović	Dejan Abadić	3:22
4.	"Davno si ubio ponos u meni" (You Killed the Pride in Me Long Ago)	Dragan Brajović	Dejan Abadić	4:42
5.	"Lijepe žene" (Beautiful Women)	Marina Tucaković; B. Čekić	Dejan Abadić	3:25
6.	"Boli me noć, boli me dan" (The Night Hurts Me, the Day Hurts Me)	Dragiša Baša	Dejan Abadić	3:40
7.	"Malo se poigraj" (Play a Little)	Marina Tucaković; B. Čekić	Dejan Abadić	2:55
8.	"Kad se ne da, ne da se" (When It Can't, It Can't (featuring Aca Lukas))	Marina Tucaković; B. Čekić	Dejan Abadić	3:50
9.	"Tako si hladan" (You're So Cold)	Selma Bajrami	Dejan Abadić	3:06

== Personnel ==
- Bane Kljajić – acoustic guitar, bouzouki
- Dragutin Jakovljević Guta – electric guitar
- Dejan Kostić Piromanac – violin
- Biljana Obradović Bixy - Back vocals

== Production and recording ==
- Dejan Abadić – arrangement, producing
- Goran Šimpraga – mastering
- Đorđe Petrović – programming, recording

== Music videos ==
In December 2006, she filmed the music for the song "Ostrvo tuge" in Skopje, Macedonia.

- Promjeni se
- Kad se ne da, ne da se
- Ostrvo tuge

== Tour ==
Following the release of The Island of Sorrow, Selma went on an American tour, performing for the Bosnian diaspora in the United States.
