= Trnovac, Novi Travnik =

Trnovac
- Village
- Location within Bosnia and Herzegovina
- Coordinates: 44.08156°N 17.625978°E
- Country: Bosnia and Herzegovina
- Entity: Federation of Bosnia and Herzegovina
- Canton: Central Bosnia
- Municipality: Novi Travnik

Area
  - Total: 1.07 sq mi (2.76 km^{2})

Population (2013)
  - Total: 0
  - Density: 0.0/sq mi (0.0/km^{2})
- Time zone: UTC+1 (CET)
  - Summer (DST): UTC+2 (CEST)

Trnovac is a village in the municipality of Novi Travnik, Bosnia and Herzegovina.

== Demographics ==
According to the 2013 census, its population was none, down from 92 (all Serbs) in 1991.
