= Ilidža Folk Music Festival =

Annual folk music festival in Sarajevo, Bosnia

- Genre: Folk
- Dates: July
- Locations: Ilidža, Sarajevo, Bosnia and Herzegovina
- Years active: 1964–present
- Organiser: Fabrice Lamproie; Sarajevo Music Academy; Pro Helvetia
- Website: Official Website

The Ilidža Folk Music Festival (Bosnian: Festival narodne muzike Ilidža; Serbian Cyrillic: Фестивал народне музике Илиџа) is the oldest living and premier folk music festival in the Former Yugoslavia. It is held annually in Ilidža, Sarajevo, Bosnia and Herzegovina. The festival was established in 1964 by the Association of Bosnian Recording Artists, is held in July and lasts for four days. The event hosts contemporary and traditional artists in genres under the umbrella of Folk, including Sevdalinka, Starogradska, Modern Folk, Novokomponovana, Macedonian Folk, Turbo-folk and accordion music. It has traditionally been the premier showpiece event for folk recording artists in Yugoslavia, with the two major Yugoslav record labels Jugoton and PGP-RTS releasing live LPs of each year's edition. Numerous folk singers from the Former Yugoslavia were either signed by record labels or received wider media exposure following performances at the festival. Serbian Turbo-folk star Ceca performed at the 1988 edition when she was 15 years old and won the competition with her single Cvetak Zanovetak, while Hanka Paldum was signed by Diskoton after winning the newcomer competition in 1974.

== History ==
Sarajevo was a traditional hub for folk music in the Former Yugoslavia, with numerous recording artists from other parts of the country moving to the city in hopes of being discovered and in search of artistic inspiration. The city's vibrant music venue scene that included countless live music clubs, bars and kafanas attracted interpreters of traditional Bosnian Sevdalinka and Romani music, as well contemporary folk singers and musicians of the day. In 1963 the Association of Bosnian Recording Artists organized the Meeting of Performers and Singers of Folk Music '63, which was a precursor to the festival and was held in the Sarajevo suburb of Ilidža.

One year later the festival was founded under the working title Festival of Folk Songs and Dances – Ilidža (Bosnian: Festival narodnih pjesama i igara Ilidža; Serbian Cyrillic: Фестивал народних пјесама и игара Илиџa). The first edition was immediately endorsed by all major folk-based record labels and hosted performances by Safet Isović, Beba Selimović, Zaim Imamović and Silvana Armenulić. The festival quickly grew in size and in 1969 its live performance LP went platinum by selling 1,700,000 copies. The 1970 edition was the first to receive more than 700 applicants and was rebranded as the Ilidža Festival of Yugoslav Song.

With the start of the Siege of Sarajevo and the Bosnian war, Ilidža found itself in Serb-controlled territory and the festival's run was halted. After the Dayton Peace Accords were signed in 1995, the suburb was reintegrated into Sarajevo. The festival was reestablished in 1998 under the patronage of the Ilidza Municipality and the Sarajevo Canton. Since 2013 the festival is held in cooperation with the Hayat Television Network. In 2014 it celebrated its 50th anniversary.

== Format ==
The festival runs four competition programmes:

- Guardians of Tradition – designed to showcase traditional Balkan folk music genres such as Sevdalinka and Starogradska.
- First Accordion – a competition programme for folk accordion musicians.
- Folk Music Competition Evening – a competition programme for newcomers and unsigned talent.
- Giants of Folk Music – the festival's hallmark programme that hosts performances by the biggest names in Balkan folk music.
