= Dženan Lončarević =

Serbian singer

Dženan Lončarević Џенан Лончаревић
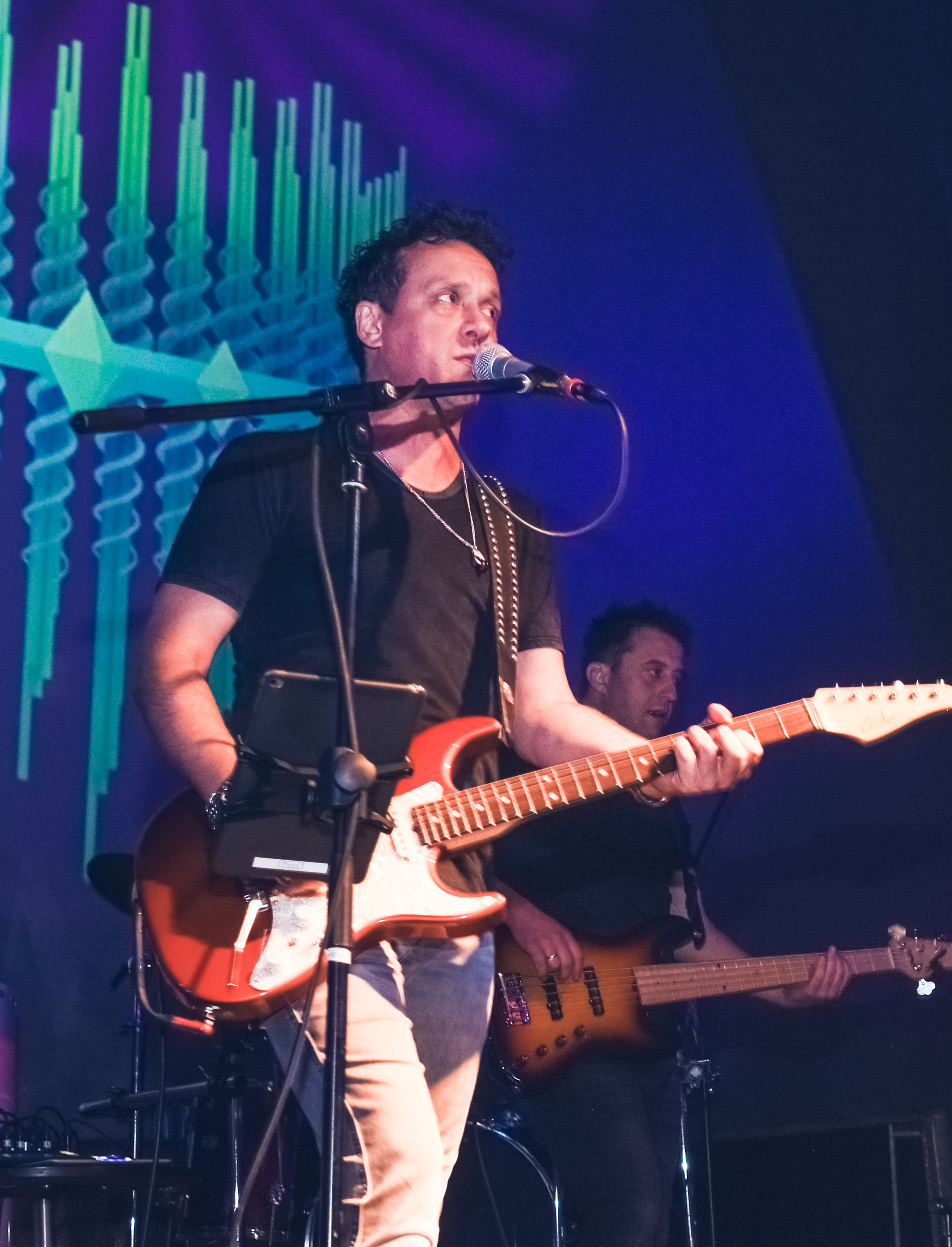
- Lončarević in 2019

Background information
- Birth name: Dženan Lončarević
- Born: 10 April 1975 (age 49); Prijepolje, SR Serbia, SFR Yugoslavia
- Genres: Pop, pop-folk
- Occupation: Singer
- Years active: 2000–present

Dženan Lončarević (Serbo-Croatian Cyrillic: Џенан Лончаревић; born 10 April 1975) is a Serbian pop singer. He has lived in Belgrade since 2006. On 4 March 2019 he competed in the Beovizija with the song "Nema suza" (No Tears) and finished in the second place.

== Discography ==
- Nikome ni reč (2007)
- Dobro je to (2009)
- Zdravo dušo (2011)
- No 4 (2013)
- Dva su koraka (2015)
