= Elvir Mekić =

Macedonian musician (born 1981)

- Born: 15 October 1981 (age 44)
- Genres: Pop, R&B
- Occupations: Singer, songwriter
- Years active: 2000s-present
- Label: Plan B Production

Elvir Mekić (Macedonian: Елвир Мекиќ) (born 15 October 1981) is a Macedonian musician. He gained popularity after performing his single "Opasno" with Maja Sazdanovska at Ohrid Fest in 2007. He went on to release a second and third single from his debut album, Opasno, titled "Ušte Te Ima" and "Nekade Posle Dva", respectively. Mekić also competed in the 2008 Macedonian Eurovision qualifier, Skopje Fest 2008, with the song "Armija".

== Early life and career ==
Of Bosniak origin, Mekić's career began when he was a teenager and his talent was soon discovered. His first song "Se Šeknuvam" became very popular in the Republic of Macedonia. After successfully producing several singles, he took a break from producing his own music so he could begin writing lyrics for other artists that were popular in the Republic of Macedonia. He returned to music-making in 2007 with the song "Neka Te Zaboravi", of the studio album, Opasno.

After performing the song "Armija" at Skopje Fest 2008, Elvir, along with his best friend and fellow musician, Jovan Jovanov, organised a concert to be held in Skopje. Only one concert was planned for the 10 April 2008, but due to high ticket sales, a subsequent concert was scheduled for the following evening. In late 2008, Mekić collaborated with Serbian singer and former Đogani member, Slađa Delibašić. The pair released a Serbo-Croatian single titled "5 Minuta". He wrote the lyrics for the Macedonian entry to the 2009 Eurovision Contest.

In 2010, he sang "Što je od Boga dobro je" with Bosnian singer Selma Bajrami on her album Selma 2010.

== Discography ==
=== Studio album ===
- Opasno (2007)
- Kako Nov (2009)

=== Singles ===
- 2007: "Opasno" (featuring Maja Sazdanovska)
- 2007: "Ušte Te Ima"
- 2008: "Nekade Posle Dva"
