= Selma Bajrami (album) =

Selma

Studio album by Selma Bajrami
- Released: 23 July 2014
- Recorded: 2012–14: Sarajevo; Belgrade
- Genre: pop folk
- Label: City Records
- Producer: Dejan Abadić; Samir Selmanović; Atelje Trag

Selma Bajrami chronology
Zakon sudbine (2010)	Selma (2014)	Embargo (2024)

Singles from Selma Bajrami
- 1. "James Dean" Released: 14 December 2012; 2. "Nisam ti oprostila" Released: 19 December 2013; 3. "Moje milo" Released: 31 December 2013; 4. "Tijelo bez duše" Released: 4 June 2014; 5. "Samo tvoje oči" Released: 2014

Selma is the eponymous eighth studio album by Bosnian pop-folk singer Selma Bajrami. It was released 23 July 2014 through Hayat Production in Bosnia and Herzegovina and City Records in Serbia.

== Singles ==
A 20-second preview of the lead single "James Dean" (named after the American actor) was released on SoundCloud on 30 November 2012, while full song was released on YouTube on 14 December 2012. The song was originally titled "Djevojke" ("Girls").

The second single "Nisam ti oprostila" ("I Haven't Forgiven You") and its music video premiered 19 December 2013. Less than two weeks later, Bajrami sang the ballad, "Moje milo" ("My Dear") at a New Year's Eve television special. It served as the album's third single and is about her son, who was 17 months old at the time.

On 4 June 2014, "Tijelo bez duše" ("Body Without a Soul"), the album's upbeat pop fourth single, co-produced by Atelje Trag, had its premiere when the music video was released. The video was filmed in March 2014.

== Track listing ==
No.	Title	Writer(s)	Producer(s)	Length
1.	"Tijelo bez duše" (Body Without a Soul)	Dragan Brajović Braja; Atelje Trag	Atelje Trag	3:34
2.	"Nisam ti oprostila" (I Haven't Forgiven You)	Pavle Subotić	Samir Selmanović; Marko Drežnjak	3:51
3.	"Da mi je" (I Want To)	Dragan Brajović Braja	Dejan Abadić	3:55
4.	"Što je tuđe, to je tuđe" (What Belongs to Someone, Belongs to Them)	Dragan Brajović Braja	Samir Selmanović	4:02
5.	"Moje milo" (My Dear)	Lejla Terović Adilović; Mensura Bajraktarević	Samir Selmanović	4:34
6.	"Zabrani mi da te volim" (Forbid Me to Love You)	Pavle Subotić; Marko Drežnjak	Samir Selmanović	4:06
7.	"Kako vrijeme prolazi" (How Time Passes)	Esad Osmani	Samir Selmanović	4:33
8.	"James Dean"	Georg Zan Goll	Dejan Abadić	3:41
9.	"Samo tvoje oči" (Just Your Eyes)	Pavle Subotić	Samir Selmanović	4:02

== Personnel ==
=== Instruments ===
- Mensura Bajraktarević – backing vocals
- Suzana Dinić – backing vocals
- Vernesa Deljkić – backing vocals
- Vernes Ljuštaku – backing vocals, bass guitar
- Petar Trumbetaš – guitar
- Dejan Abadić – keyboards
- Samir Selmanović – keyboards, accordion

=== Production and recording ===
- Dejan Abadić – arrangement (3, 8), mastering (2, 3, 4, 5, 6, 7, 8, 9)
- Vernes Ljuštaku – arrangement (2, 4, 5, 6, 7, 9)
- Vuk Zirojević – mastering (2, 3, 4, 5, 6, 7, 8, 9), mixing (3, 8), recording
- Samir Selmanović – mixing (2, 4, 5, 6, 7, 9)
- Đorđe Petrović – programming
- Amil Lojo – recording
- Marin Meštrović – recording

=== Crew ===
- Stevan Miljković – design
- Dejan Milićević – music video director
