= Revolucija (album) =

Revolucija (Revolution)

Studio album by Selma Bajrami
- Released: 5 April 2001
- Genre: Folk
- Label: Nimfa Sound (Bosnia), Grand Production (Serbia)

Selma Bajrami chronology
Ljubav si ubio gade (1999)	Revolucija (Revolution) (2001)	Žena sa Balkana (2002)

Serbian release
- Serbian release

Revolucija (Revolution) is the third studio album by Bosnian pop-folk singer Selma Bajrami. It was released in April 2001.

== Track listing ==
=== Bosnian version ===
1. Hajde živio (Go and Live)
2. Oči istine (Truthful Eyes)
3. Tako sam mlada (I'm So Young)
4. Oči zelene (Green Eyes)
5. Nije više 18 meni (I'm Not 18 Anymore)
6. Otvori se zemljo (Open, Earth)
7. Idi od mene (Get Away from Me)
8. Ne mogu te voljeti (I Cannot Love You)
9. Svi ste vi isti (You're All the Same)
10. Živa zdrava (Alive and Well)

=== Serbian version ===
1. Tako sam mlada (I'm So Young)
2. Hajde živio (Go and Live)
3. Otvori se zemljo (Open, Earth)
4. Živa zdrava (Alive and Well)
5. Idi od mene (Get Away from Me)
6. Oči istine (Truthful Eyes)
7. Oči zelene (Green Eyes)
8. Ne mogu te voljeti (I Cannot Love You)
9. Nije više 18 meni (I'm Not 18 Anymore)
10. Svi ste vi isti (You're All the Same)
