= Kakvo tijelo Selma ima =

Studio album by Selma Bajrami
- Released: 27 December 2004
- Genres: Pop-folk, dance
- Label: Hayat Production

Selma Bajrami chronology
| Žena sa Balkana (2002) | Kakvo tijelo Selma ima (2004) | Ostrvo tuge (2007) |

Singles from Selma Bajrami
- 1. "Kakvo tijelo Selma ima" Released: 2004; 2. "Tijelo uz tijelo" Released: 2004; 3. "Kada iza sebe pogledam" Released: 2004; 4. "Muška suza" Released: 2004

Kakvo tijelo Selma ima (What A Body Selma Has) is the fifth studio album by Bosnian pop-folk singer Selma Bajrami. It was released in 2004.

The title track was released as a single and made her a sensation and household name in the Balkans.

In 2010, a demo version of the song "Muška suza" (A Man's Tears) sung by Serbian singer Dragana Mirković, was leaked on YouTube.

== Track listing ==
1. Kakvo tijelo Selma ima (What a Body Selma Has)
2. Žalim (I Regret)
3. Tijelo uz tijelo (Body Against Body)
4. Muška suza (A Man's Tear)
5. Kada iza sebe pogledam (When I Look Behind Myself)
6. Ljubavi jedina (Only Love)
7. Divlji zov (Call of the Wild)
8. Prva ljubav (First Love)
