= Enes Begović =

- Born: 6 June 1965 (age 60); Visoko, SR Bosnia and Herzegovina, SFR Yugoslavia
- Occupations: Singer-songwriter; producer
- Years active: 1985–present
- Musical career
- Genres: Pop-folk; Folk
- Instrument: Vocals
- Labels: Diskoton; Jugodisk; Grand Production

Enes Begović (born 6 June 1965) is a Bosnian pop-folk singer and producer.

== Early life ==
Enes Begović was born on 6 June 1965 in Visoko, SR Bosnia and Herzegovina. While attending a Visoko high school in 1978, Begović passed an audition as a solo vocalist, an event that inspired his interest in music.

== Career ==
Begović entered the professional music world in 1985, releasing his first studio album Još samo jednom sjeti se that same year under the label Diskoton. His second studio album Šta bih ja bez tebe (1987) featured the hit song "Siroče" (Orphan). 1990 saw Begović move from Diskoton to the label Jugodisk for his third studio album Bosanac. The album and the song of the same name became huge successes, with the album selling at least 500,000 copies.

Begović won the 2008 Ilidža music festival with the song "Duša Sarajeva" (The Soul of Sarajevo), written by Dragan Stojković Bosanac. Begović recorded the pop-rock duet "Dva jarana" with Mladen Vojičić Tifa in March 2011. The song was written by Bosnian-German songwriter Amir Jesenković. "Dva jarana" was originally intended to be recorded with Nihad Alibegović.

On 26 November 2011, a 25th Anniversary concert was held at Sarajevo's Mirza Delibašić Hall to mark the 25th year of Begović's professional career.

His 2016 Australian tour kicked off with a concert in Perth on 4 March 2016. Begović performed for the Bosnian diaspora in Sydney, Brisbane, Adelaide, and finished the tour with two concerts in Melbourne on 18 and 19 March.

== Discography ==
- Još samo jednom sjeti se (1985)
- Šta bih ja bez tebe (1987)
- Bosanac (1990)
- Noćima nema kraja (1991)
- Noćna ptica (1993)
- Noći pune ljubavi (1995)
- Od života uzmi sve (1997)
- Oprosti joj, bože (1999)
- Samo jednom se živi (2001)
- Da se napijem (2002)
- Tako te volim (2004)
- Oči boje badema (2006)
- Za ljubav (2008)
- Lijepa je (2011)
- 19 (2019)

== See also ==
- List of Bosnia and Herzegovina patriotic songs
