= June 1966 =

Month of 1966

<<	June 1966					>>
Su	Mo	Tu	We	Th	Fr	Sa
			1	2	3	4
5	6	7	8	9	10	11
12	13	14	15	16	17	18
19	20	21	22	23	24	25
26	27	28	29	30

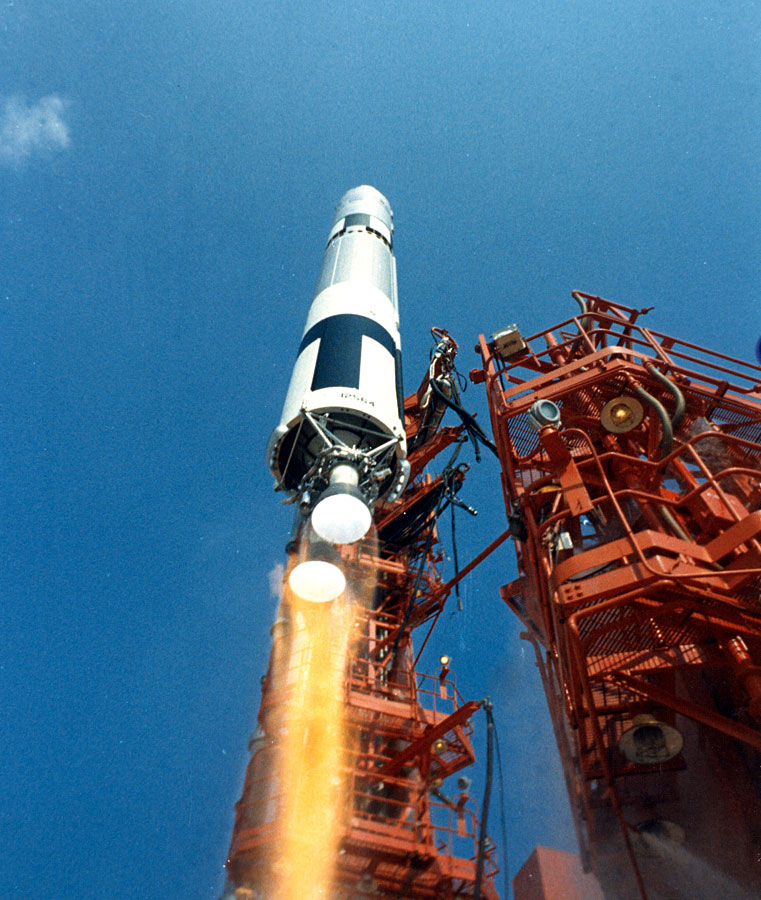
June 3, 1966: Gemini 9A launched

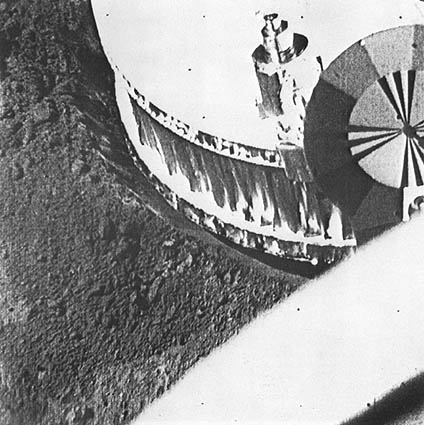
June 2, 1966: Surveyor 1 takes selfie of "footprint" on Moon

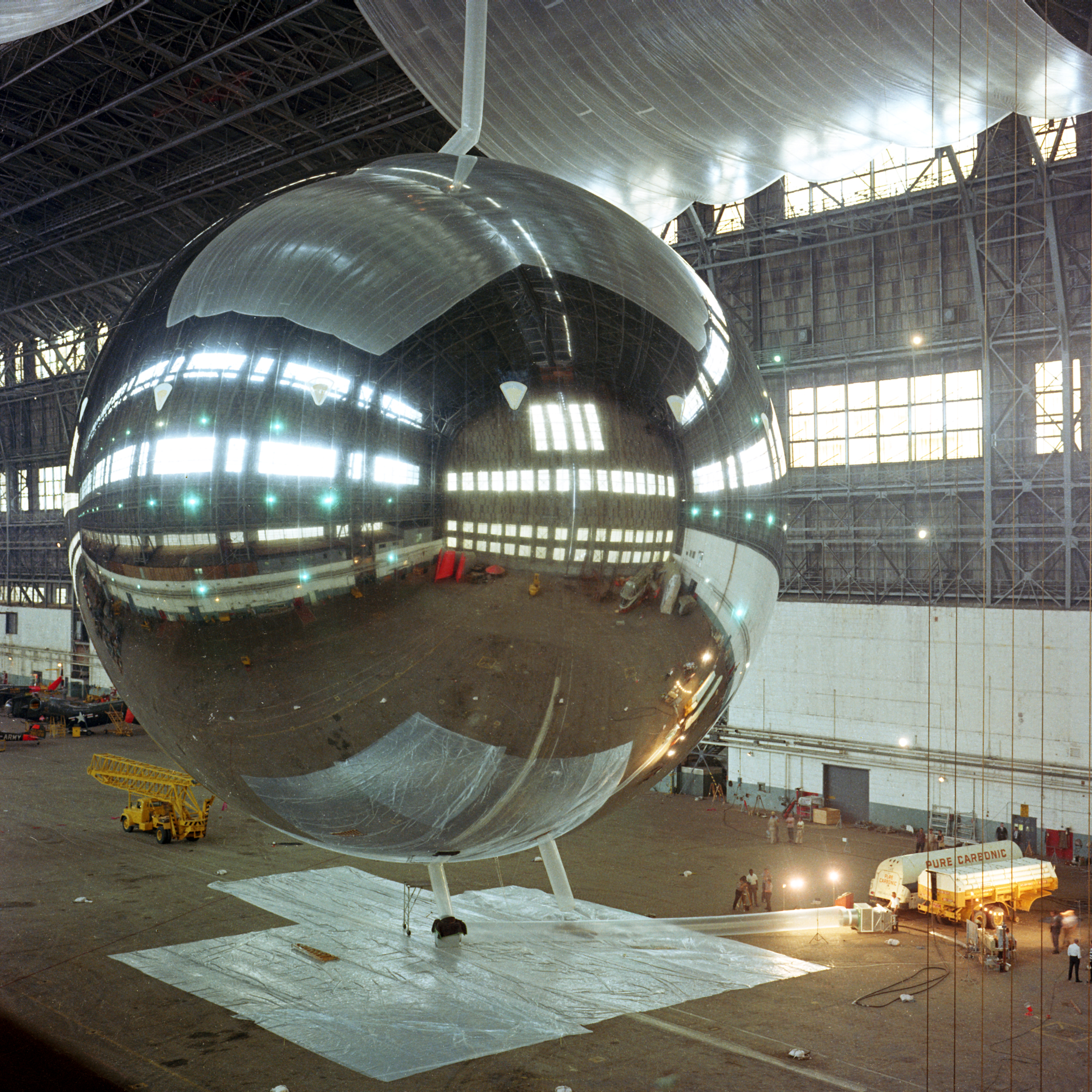
June 23, 1966: PAGEOS, big enough to be seen with naked eye, put into orbit

The following events occurred in June 1966:

== June 1, 1966 (Wednesday) ==
- The 158th and last original episode of The Dick Van Dyke Show appeared on the CBS television network. The situation comedy, starring Dick Van Dyke, Mary Tyler Moore, Morey Amsterdam and Rose Marie, ran for five seasons after its debut on October 3, 1961. During the final season of production, each of the supporting members of the cast featured in at least one show about their character. In the series finale, entitled "The Last Chapter", Van Dyke's Rob Petrie finally completed the project on which he had been working for five years, the writing of a book, and much of it was a "clip show" featuring film clips of prior episodes. In syndication, however, the last episode shown in rotation would be "The Gunslinger", a Wild West dream that was filmed on March 22 and marked the last appearance of the entire cast.
- With the countdown clock at only one minute, 49 seconds before scheduled liftoff from Cape Kennedy, the Gemini 9 mission was halted for the third time, after an electronic switching circuit failed. The mission was recycled for launch on June 3. One hour and 40 minutes earlier, the "Augmented Target Docketing Adapter" (ATDA), which had replaced the lost Agena target vehicle with which Gemini astronauts Thomas P. Stafford and Gene Cernan were to link up, was successfully launched from complex 14.
- People's Daily, the official newspaper of the Chinese Communist Party, published the editorial "Sweep Away All Ghosts and Monsters", calling upon the general public to attack any activities that appeared to be "counterrevolutionary" to the doctrines espoused by Party Chairman Mao Zedong. The directive would be followed by a purge of party officials in Beijing, and a call on June 4 for even stronger attacks.
- Éamon de Valera, the last surviving leader of the 1916 Easter Uprising, was re-elected to a second seven-year term as President of Ireland. The 84-year-old Irish hero, candidate of the Fianna Fáil political party, defeated former Minister for Health Tom O'Higgins of the Fine Gael party in one of the closest elections in the Republic's history. De Valera received 558,538 votes against the 548,240 for Higgins.
- In a race between three Presidents, Joaquín Balaguer defeated Juan Bosch and Rafael F. Bonnelly to win the election for President of the Dominican Republic. The final tally was Balaguer with 754,409 votes; Bosch with 517,784; and Bonnelly a distant third with 45,073.
- Died:
  - Peter George, 42, British author of the thriller novel Red Alert, which was later adapted for the film Dr. Strangelove in 1964; of a self-inflicted gunshot wound
  - Cécile Butticaz, 81, who in 1907 became the first female engineer in Europe
  - Papa Jack Laine, 92, American jazz musician

== June 2, 1966 (Thursday) ==
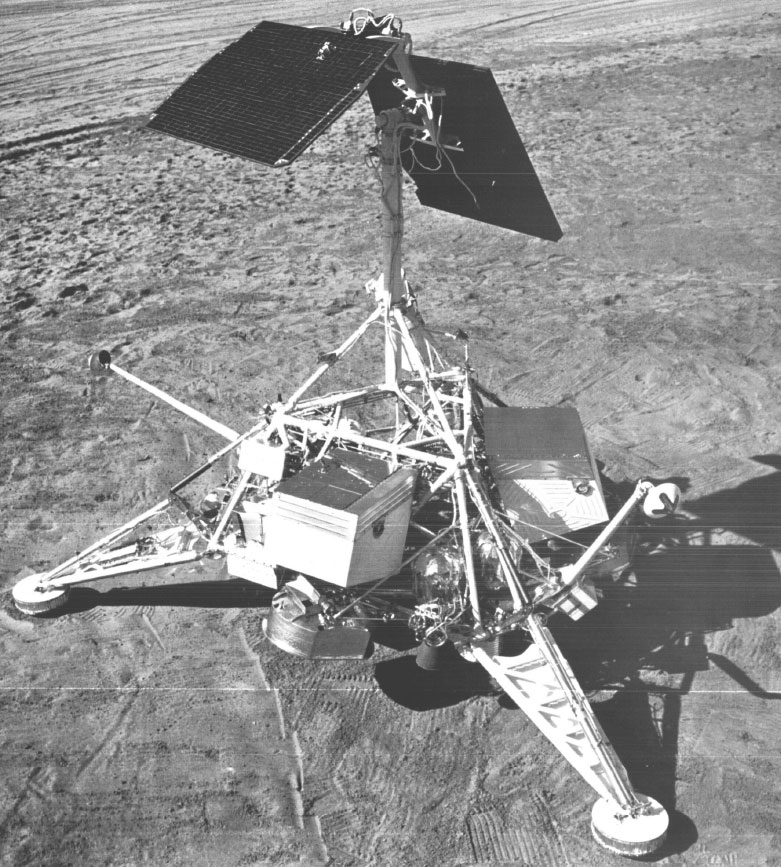
NASA's Surveyor 1 (model, on Earth)

- Surveyor 1 landed in the Oceanus Procellarum (the "Sea of Storms"), 35 miles (56 km) north of the crater Flamsteed, at 2:17:37 a.m. Florida time, after a 63-hour journey, becoming the first American spacecraft to make a soft landing on the Moon, using retrorockets to slow its descent. Hours later, NASA received the first television transmissions from Surveyor. The photos were expected to be sharper than those transmitted from the first probe to make a soft landing on the Moon, Luna 9, which had arrived four months earlier, on February 3. Over the next 11 days, the probe returned 11,240 photographs of the Moon to Earth before the transmission solar-powered batteries failed on June 13 due to darkness.
- Born:
  - Candace Gingrich, American LGBT rights activist; in Harrisburg, Pennsylvania
  - Catherine King, Australian politician, Minister for Infrastructure, Transport, Regional Development and Local Government (2022-present), in Melbourne
- Died: Former Prime Minister Évariste Kimba, 39, and three other former cabinet ministers of the Democratic Republic of the Congo (Jérôme Anany, Emmanuel Bamba and André Mahamba), were publicly executed by hanging for alleged involvement in a plot to kill Mobutu Sese Seko.

== June 3, 1966 (Friday) ==
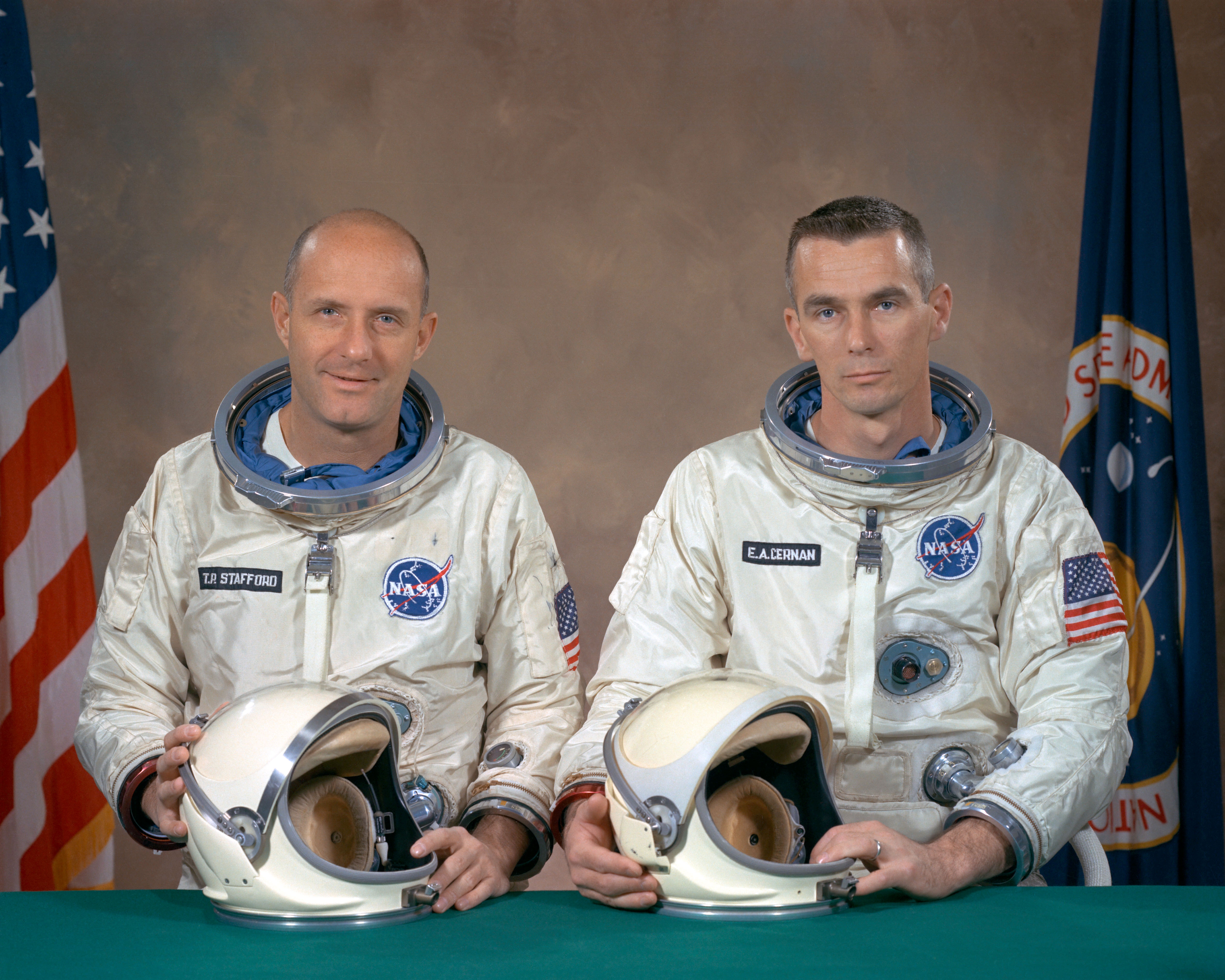
Stafford and Cernan

- After several postponements, Gemini 9A, the seventh crewed and third rendezvous mission of the Gemini program, was launched into orbit at 9:39 a.m. from complex 19 at Cape Kennedy, crewed by command pilot Astronaut Thomas P. Stafford and pilot Astronaut Eugene A. Cernan. After successfully achieving rendezvous during the third revolution, the crew discovered that the augmented target docking adapter (ATDA) shroud had failed to separate, precluding docking.

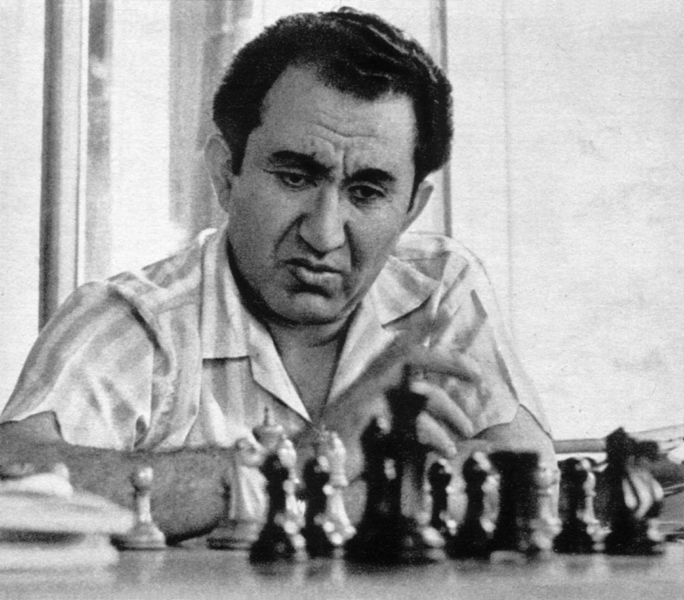
Petrosian

- Tigran Petrosian retained his title in the World Chess Championship, defeating Boris Spassky in the 22nd game of the 24-game series in Moscow that had started on April 11. Under the rules, a draw game counted as one-half of a point for each player, and the first to reach 12 points would win the match. Going into the game, Petrosian had an 11 to 10 lead based on three wins and 16 draws.
- Born: Wasim Akram, Pakistani cricketer named as the Wisden Leading Cricketer in the World in 1992 for his bowler abilities; in Lahore
- Died: Alice Calhoun, 65, American silent film actress

== June 4, 1966 (Saturday) ==
- People's Daily, the official newspaper of the Chinese Communist Party, published a warning to all of China's citizens, declaring that "Anyone who opposes Chairman Mao Tze-tung, opposes Mao Tze-tung's thoughts, opposes the party central leadership, opposes the proletariat's dictatorship, opposes the correct way of socialism, whoever that may be, however high may the position be, and however old his standing, will be struck down by the entire Party and the entire people." The editorial, carrying the title "A Big Revolution to Touch People to Their Innermost Being", encouraged people for the first time to physically attack political deviants, and came one day after most of the party leaders in the city of Beijing were dismissed for being "an anti-Party, anti-socialist, counterrevolutionary group which had been exposed during the socialist cultural revolution", including Mayor Peng Chen, considered at one time to be one of the most powerful men in China. Peng, who had been out of public view since April, was replaced by Li Hsueh-feng.
- The United Kingdom dropped its space program because of increasing costs, withdrawing from the European Launcher Development Organisation (ELDO), a coalition of seven nations whose goal was to place a communications satellite into orbit by 1970. The UK had been paying almost 40 percent of the costs, which had increased from $190,000,000 to $442,000,000.
- The Senate of the Philippines voted, 15–8, to authorize President Ferdinand Marcos to send 2,000 soldiers to South Vietnam. With that action, they became the fourth nation to join the United States in entering the Vietnam War, along with South Korea, Australia and New Zealand.
- The crew of Gemini 9A achieved a rendezvous from above with the ADTA, simulating the rendezvous of an Apollo command module with an Apollo Lunar Module in a lower orbit. EVA was postponed because of crew fatigue, and the second day was given over to experiments.
- Born: Cecilia Bartoli, Italian mezzo-soprano; in Rome
- Died:
  - Chang Myon, 62, Prime Minister of South Korea during the Korean War
  - Arthur C. Cope, 58, American organic chemist

== June 5, 1966 (Sunday) ==
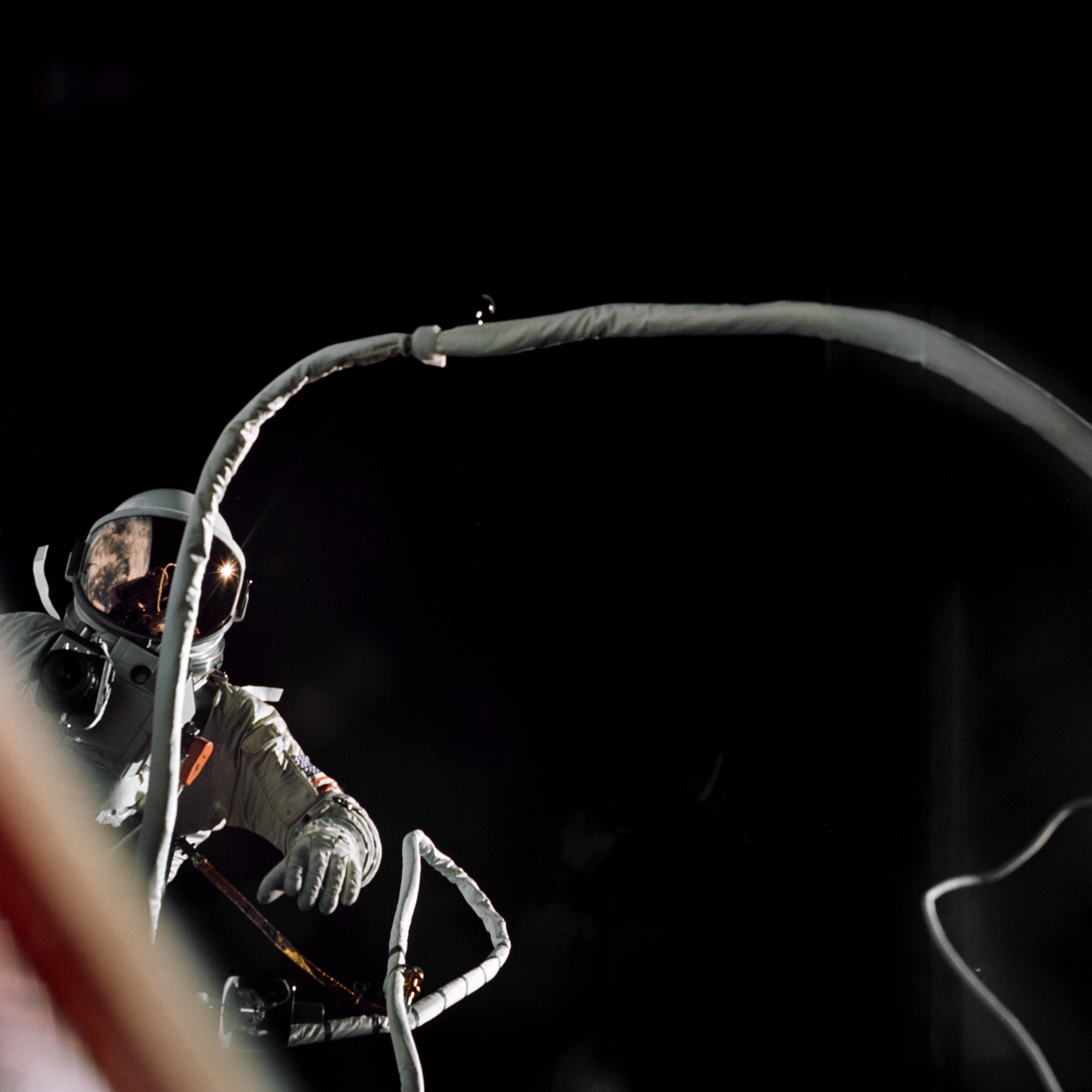
June 5, 1966: Gene Cernan during EVA

- Gene Cernan made the second American spacewalk (and only the third ever), spending a record two hours and seven minutes outside of the Gemini 9A capsule as it orbited the Earth. During the time between Cernan's departure from the capsule at 10:59 a.m. Florida time, and his return at 1:06 p.m., the spacecraft made one complete orbit, which some likened to Cernan making a walk around the world. EVA was successful, but one secondary objective - evaluation of the astronaut maneuvering unit (AMU) - was not achieved because Cernan's visor began fogging. The extravehicular life support system apparently became overloaded with moisture when Cernan had to work harder than anticipated to prepare the AMU for donning. The rest of the third day was spent on experiments.
- India's Prime Minister Indira Gandhi announced a devaluation of 36.5% of the national currency, the rupee, as a measure of fighting inflation and promoting exports, but without consultation with other leaders of her political party, and, as one observer would note, "despite her complete lack of knowledge on matters relating to money and economics". Rupees that had previously been worth $0.21 American were now worth 13 cents; and an American dollar that previously exchanged for 4.75 rupees was now buying 7.5 rupees. Rather than increasing exports and their value, the devaluation would have the opposite effect.
- Voting took place to fill 52 vacancies in the 150-seat Senate of Turkey. The Justice Party, led by Prime Minister Süleyman Demirel, won 35 of the vacancies to increase its control over both houses of parliament.
- Died: Edward Arthur Carr, 63, British colonial administrator who governed Nigeria from 1947 to 1954

== June 6, 1966 (Monday) ==
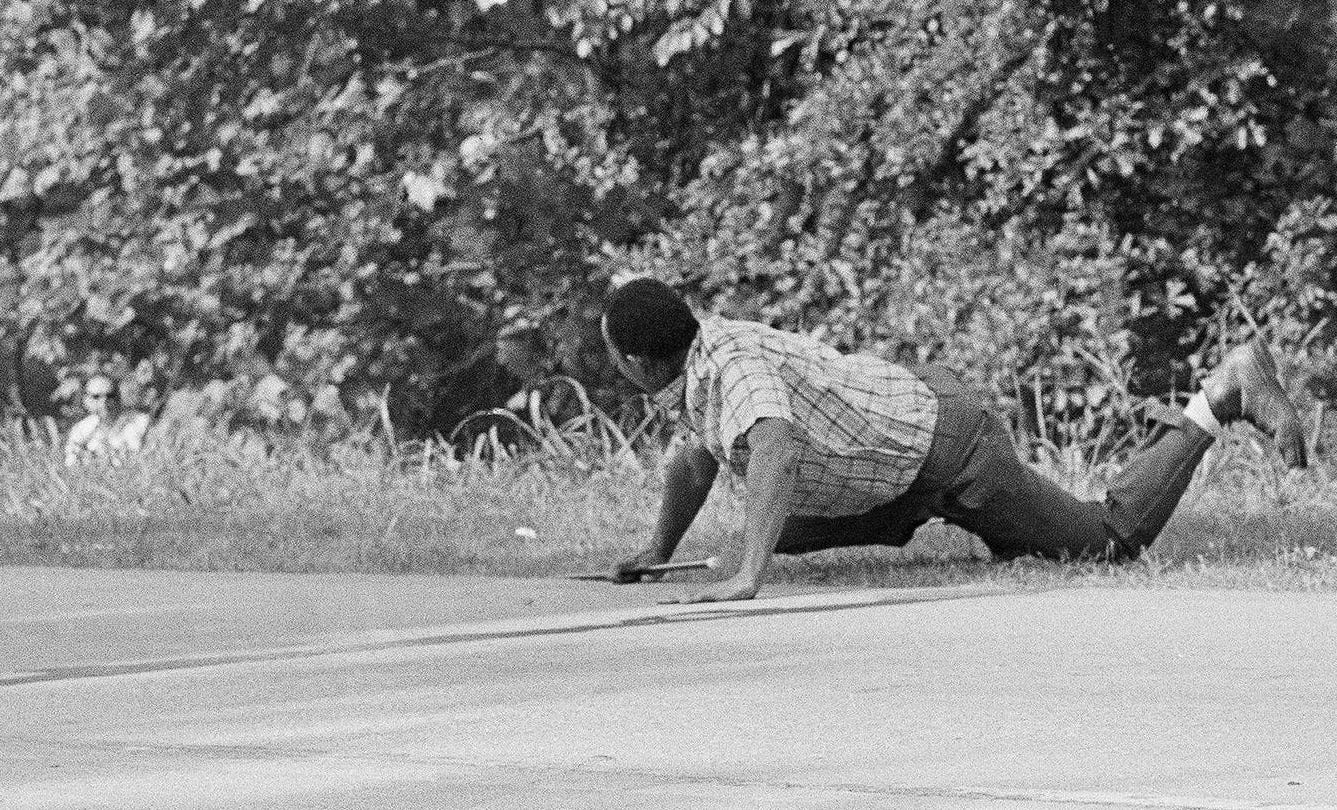
June 6, 1966: Thornell's photograph

- The day after African-American activist James Meredith began his "March Against Fear", walking the 235 miles (378 km) from Memphis, Tennessee, to Jackson, Mississippi, to "tear down the fear that grips Negroes in Mississippi", he was shot from ambush. Near the town of Hernando, Mississippi, Aubrey James Norvell came out from underneath a culvert on U.S. Highway 51, aimed his 16-gauge shotgun, and fired three blasts at Meredith, striking him in the head, right shoulder and leg. Because Norvell had loaded his gun with birdshot shells, Meredith's wounds were not life-threatening. DeSoto County and several other deputies arrested Norvell, although a witness said that the police had done nothing to stop the sniper when he had first appeared. Meredith was not alone in his march. He was accompanied by five friends as well as newsmen and police. One of the newsmen, Jack R. Thornell, took a photograph of Meredith, lying on the ground in pain, which also appears to show Aubrey James Norvell standing in a wooded area in the background. The photo would later win the Pulitzer Prize for Photography. Meredith would recover from his wound and rejoin the march before it reached Jackson. During his march, 4,000 African-Americans in Mississippi would register to vote. Norvell would be released from the Mississippi State Penitentiary after two years incarceration.
- The United States Supreme Court reversed the murder conviction of Dr. Sam Sheppard, almost twelve years after his wife had been found beaten to death in their home in Bay Village, Ohio. In an 8–1 decision, the Court ruled that Sheppard had been denied due process during the highly publicized proceedings, and ordered the state of Ohio to promptly retry the case, or to dismiss the charges. Justice Tom C. Clark wrote, "The fact is that bedlam reigned at the courthouse... The carnival atmosphere at trial could easily have been avoided since the courtroom and courthouse premises are subject to the control of the court." Four days later, Cuyahoga County, Ohio, prosecutor John T. Corrigan announced that his office would try Sheppard again in September. In his second jury trial, however, Sheppard would be found not guilty and would be released after 12 years in prison, on November 16; he would die less than four years later, on April 6, 1970.
- The groundbreaking British TV situation comedy Till Death Us Do Part, created by Johnny Speight, premiered on BBC1. Starring Warren Mitchell as "Alf Garnett", a right-wing, racist blue-collar laborer in London's East End, and featuring Alf's wife Else Garnett, daughter Rita Rawlins and left-wing son-in-law Mike Rawlins living in the Garnett home. U.S. producer Norman Lear would purchase the rights to adapt the British programme as the successful American sitcom All in the Family.
- Hurricane Alma struck Honduras, and the torrential rains that came in its wake killed 73 people in the small town of San Rafael. 30 inches (760 mm) of rain fell on San Rafael over a period of a few hours, causing floods and landslides more than 3 feet (0.91 m) deep. The hurricane then swept across Cuba and the Florida Keys.
- The Gemini 9A crew prepared for retrofire, which was initiated during the 45th revolution. The spacecraft landed within 1 mile (1.6 km) of the primary recovery ship, the aircraft carrier USS Wasp (CV-18). The crew remained with the spacecraft, which was hoisted aboard 53 minutes after landing.
- Born: Faure Gnassingbé, 4th President of Togo since 2005; in Afagnan, Togo
- Died:
  - Claudette Frady-Orbison, 25, wife of singer Roy Orbison. She and her husband were riding on a motorcycle at Gallatin, Tennessee, when they were struck by a pickup truck, killing her and injuring him.
  - Ethel Clayton, 83, American silent film actress

== June 7, 1966 (Tuesday) ==
- Husband-and-wife pilots Robert and Joan Wallick completed their round-the-world airplane flight in five days, six hours, 16 minutes and 40 seconds, a record time for a propeller-driven plane, as their twin-engined Beech Baron C-55, the Philippine Baron, landed safely. The Wallicks, ranchers in Big Horn, Wyoming, took off from Manila at 8:00 on the morning of June 2 in hopes of beating the prior record of 8 days, 18 hours, 15 minutes set in 1961 by Max Conrad, and announced that their schedule would return them to Manila in 5 days, 3 hours and 58 minutes. After 23,629 miles (38,027 km), the Wallicks landed back at the Manila airport at 2:16 p.m. and were greeted by a string band and 200 well-wishers.
- Died:
  - Norman Baillie-Stewart, 57, British Army officer who defected to Nazi Germany and assisted in English-language propaganda broadcasts during World War II.
  - Jean Arp, 79, Alsatian sculptor, painter, and poet

== June 8, 1966 (Wednesday) ==
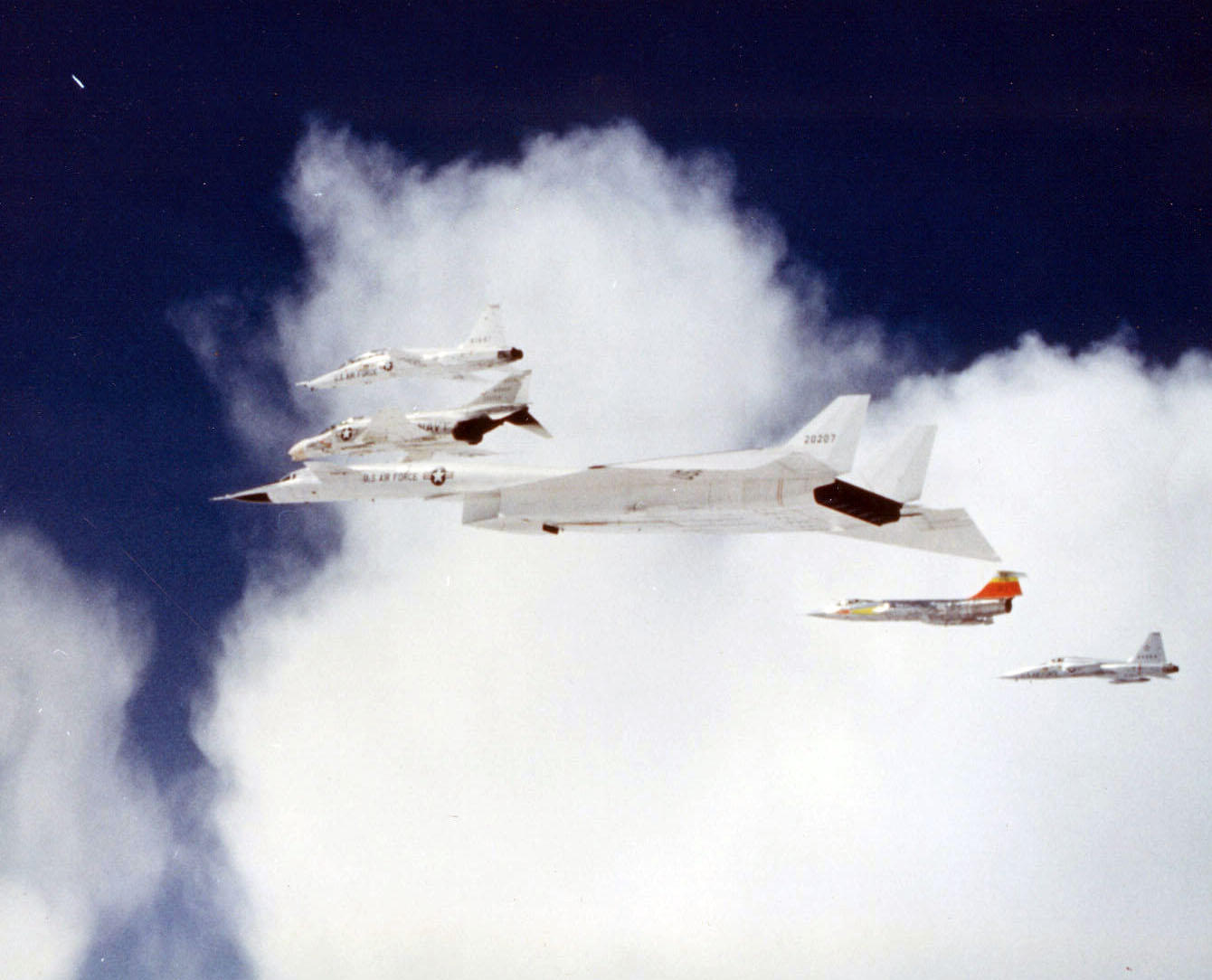
June 8, 1966: The XB-70 Valkyrie prior to the collision

- The second XB-70 Valkyrie prototype was destroyed in a mid-air collision with an F-104 Starfighter during a photo shoot of five different jets, flying in formation "in order that photographs could be taken for the use of the General Electric company, which manufactured the engines of the five aircraft". NASA pilot Joseph A. Walker, who was flying the F-104, and the XB-70's co-pilot, U.S. Air Force Major Carl Cross, were both killed. Walker was well known for holding the record for fastest airplane, when he piloted the X-15 rocket plane at 4,104 miles per hour (6,605 km/h) in 1962. Earlier in the year, he had reached a record airplane altitude of 354,200 feet (108,000 meters), placing the X-15 above the 100-kilometre (62 mi) altitude that marks outer space. Walker's plane came too close to the Valkyrie and collided with its vertical stabilizers; both airplanes crashed near Barstow, California.
- Topeka, Kansas, was devastated by the first tornado to cause more than $100,000,000 (USD) in damages. The twister, which registered as an "F5" on the Fujita scale, killed 16 people and injured hundreds. All but one of the deaths happened in Topeka, with the exception being 40 miles (64 km) to the east in Tonganoxie. The death toll might have been higher except for weather radar that allowed tornado warnings to be sounded at 7:03 p.m., fifteen minutes before the tornado arrived; thousands of homes were damaged or destroyed, and the campus of Washburn University suffered catastrophic damage; a report at the time noted that the storm caused "extensive damage to almost every building on the 160-acre campus."
- The American Football League and National Football League announced that they would merge as equals, with all of the AFL teams becoming part of the NFL in 1970. The two leagues also agreed that each of their champions would meet in an annual title game. The "AFL–NFL World Championship Game" would soon become known as the "Super Bowl".
- Born:
  - Julianna Margulies, American television actress (ER, The Good Wife) and winner of Emmy, Golden Globe, Critic's Choice and Screen Actors Guild awards; in Spring Valley, New York
  - Jens Kidman, Swedish heavy metal vocalist for Meshuggah
- Died: Anton Melik, 76, Yugoslavian professor who compiled The Geography of Slovenia

== June 9, 1966 (Thursday) ==
- George M. Low advised NASA Headquarters that Manned Spacecraft Center (MSC) was reducing its funding request for Fiscal Year 1967 in support of research on a land-landing capability for the Apollo Applications Program (AAP). Specifically, this program reduction involved halting all work dealing with braking rockets and attenuation systems and concentrating all effort on prototype development of several types of lifting parachute and parawing designs. These program changes were mandatory, Low stated, because of limited AAP development funds and because a land-landing capability was still not a firm objective (even though MSC had previously presented such a program leading to a land-landing capability for AAP by the end of 1969).
- Two days after black voters in Mississippi helped pro-civil rights candidates win primary elections in Claiborne County and Jefferson County, the Mississippi State Senate voted, 30–13, to pass a resolution for a constitutional amendment that would allow the legislature to consolidate some of the state's 82 counties.
- Benjamin Britten's work, The Burning Fiery Furnace, was premièred at Orford Church, Suffolk, by the English Opera Group.

== June 10, 1966 (Friday) ==
- Members of the "Mississippi White Knights", a gang within the White Knights of the Ku Klux Klan, killed a 67-year-old African-American man whom they had selected at random, as part of a larger plot to lure civil rights activist Martin Luther King Jr. to Natchez, Mississippi, for an assassination attempt. The victim was Ben Chester White, a sharecropper whom they lured into a car on the pretext of finding a missing dog. James Lloyd Jones drove White to a remote area of the Homochitto National Forest. Claude Fuller, who had hatched the scheme, shot White multiple times with an automatic rifle, and Ernest Avants finished off the killing with a shotgun blast to White's head. Afterward, they realized that Jones's car now had bullet holes and blood stains, so the gang set fire to the vehicle so that it could not be identified. Police quickly traced the vehicle's owner and arrested Jones, who confessed to the crime the next morning and named his accomplices. All three men would escape conviction in state proceedings, but, because the murder had been in a National Forest, Avants would be indicted decades later on federal charges, convicted of murder on February 28, 2003, and would die of heart disease a little more than a year later while in prison.
- NASA Associate Administrator for Space Science and Applications Homer E. Newell renewed his request for approval of Apollo Telescope Mount (ATM) development to NASA Deputy Administrator Robert C. Seamans, Jr. Newell repeated that detailed studies in house and under contract had established the feasibility of an ATM for conducting high-resolution observations of the Sun. He pointed out that a formal ATM organization had been created at Goddard Space Flight Center with over 30 people working full time on the project, and that they had prepared detailed scientific, technical, and management plans and were ready to begin the project immediately. Newell emphasized the importance of the ATM to the overall NASA solar physics program. Newell pleaded for project approval and assignment of necessary funds to his office so that the ATM could be completed in time for a planned launch in 1969, the next period of maximum solar activity.
- Janis Joplin made her debut as a rock vocalist, appearing with Big Brother and the Holding Company at the Avalon Ballroom in San Francisco.
- Died:
  - Joseph Biondo, 69, American mobster with the Gambino family
  - Henry Treece, 54, British poet and novelist

== June 11, 1966 (Saturday) ==
- The Queen's Birthday Honours for New Zealand were announced. Recipients included businessman James Wattie (knighted) and novelist Ngaio Marsh, who was given the female equivalent of knighthood by being made a Dame.
- Died:
  - John William Turrentine, 86, American chemist who perfected a method of mass production of potash and iodine during World War I
  - Alfred Berger, 71, Austrian figure skater who won two world championships with his partner Helene Engelmann
  - Thomas Hardie Chalmers, 81, American opera singer, actor, and filmmaker
  - Wallace Ford (Samuel Jones Grundy), 68, English-born American film actor

== June 12, 1966 (Sunday) ==
- Elections were held for the Supreme Soviet, the USSR legislature consisting of the 767 member Soviet of the Union and the 750 member Soviet of Nationalities. Voters were presented with a yes-or-no choice for the slate of 1,517 candidates endorsed by the Communist Party of the Soviet Union (CPSU). Out of 143,917,031 votes cast, there were as many as 345,643 (0.2%) "no" votes, against 143,570,976 "yes".
- The Division Street riots, the first in a major city of the United States by Puerto Ricans, broke out in Chicago after city police shot and wounded a 20-year-old man, Cruz Arcelis. Over three days, 16 people were injured, one died, and more than 50 buildings in the Puerto Rican neighborhoods on the city's northwest side, near the intersection of Division Street and Damen Avenue, were destroyed.
- The 1966 Belgian Grand Prix was held at Circuit de Spa-Francorchamps and was won by John Surtees, with Jochen Rindt in second place.
- Died: Hermann Scherchen, 74, Austrian conductor

== June 13, 1966 (Monday) ==
- The admonition of rights that would become known as the "Miranda warning" became required in the U.S. after the ruling in Miranda v. Arizona by the Supreme Court of the United States that the police must inform suspects of their constitutional rights before questioning them. The 5–4 ruling, written by Chief Justice Earl Warren, set forth that before a suspect was questioned, he must be warned of his right to remain silent and his right to an attorney or his statements could not be admitted into evidence. The required warning that begins "You have the right to remain silent..." would ever after be named for Ernesto Miranda, the suspect whose March 13, 1963 arrest made him the main petitioner in the Court case.
- Operation Kansas was carried out in the Vietnam War as a 13-man reconnaissance team was landed by helicopter in the middle of the Que Son Valley on the small mountain of Nui Loc Son. In the next 24 hours, six more recon assets were deployed in different strategic sites, ringing the valley. This enabled the teams to report on enemy activity and forward observe for ordnance payload delivery. One team worked its way south of Hiep Duc after the set up positions along the heavily wooded Hill 555. They spotted several groups of NVA forces of varying size that appeared to be training in the area.
- A collision of two trains in India, crowded with commuters, killed more than 100 people near Bombay (now Mumbai). A northbound train, heading toward the suburb of Thana, was diverted to another track that was carrying a southbound train.
- Born: Grigori Perelman, Russian Soviet mathematician who proved the soul conjecture, Thurston's geometrization conjecture, and the Poincaré conjecture; in Leningrad

== June 14, 1966 (Tuesday) ==
- The Vatican ruled that the reading of books, listed on the Index Librorum Prohibitorum as banned by the Roman Catholic Church, would no longer be a violation of church law. The Index remained, however, and church members were advised that reading such books was still a sin.
- Born:
  - Indira Radić, Serbian pop music singer; in Dragalovci, Yugoslavia
  - Eduardo Waghorn, Chilean singer-songwriter; in Santiago

== June 15, 1966 (Wednesday) ==
- In the Battle of Hill 488 at the Quảng Tín Province, the 18 men of Charlie Company, a heavily outnumbered U.S. Marine platoon, held off an attack by more than 400 well-disciplined North Vietnamese Army and Viet Cong fighters, and inflicted large casualties on the enemy, losing 14 of their own, before being able to withdraw. One Marine officer later noted, "This was an Alamo— with survivors." Gunnery Sergeant Jimmie E. Howard would be presented with the Congressional Medal of Honor for his heroism in the battle, fought at Nui Vu Hill.
- U.S. President Lyndon Johnson's pet beagle, "Him", was accidentally run over by a car and killed on a driveway at the White House. The famous dog, who sometimes appeared in photographs of the President, ran into the path of one of the White House's limousines while chasing a squirrel.
- U.S. Secretary of Defense Robert S. McNamara announced that 19,000 American military personnel were being removed from France in advance of that nation's withdrawal from NATO, and that about 300,000 tons of supplies would have to be moved, destroyed, or sold.
- Born: Roberto Carnevale, Italian classical composer, pianist, and conductor; in Catania

== June 16, 1966 (Thursday) ==
Black Power fist

- The "Black Power" Movement in the United States came into national prominence when activist Stokely Carmichael, leader of the Student Nonviolent Coordinating Committee, used it as the rallying cry for 1,500 African-American supporters of James Meredith's March Against Fear. Carmichael had been released from jail after being arrested for trespassing for erecting tents for the marchers on the grounds of the Stone Street Negro Elementary School in Greenwood, Mississippi. "Everybody owns our neighborhood except us," Carmichael told the crowd in Leflore County, where the majority of the population was black. "We outnumber the whites in this county. We want black power. That's what we want. Black power!" The marchers then took on the slogan as they proceeded toward Jackson. Carmichael added that "Every county courthouse in Mississippi should be burned tomorrow to get rid of the filth in them... the only [way] to get justice is to get a black sheriff... The only thing we can do is take over."
- Thirty-three people were killed and 40 injured after the British tanker MV Alva Cape collided with the American ship Texaco Massachusetts and caught fire, engulfing both ships and two adjacent tugboats (the Esso Vermont and the Latin American) in flames. The four ships were all sailing within the Kill Van Kull strait between New York and New Jersey. The Alva Cape was heading into the harbor of Newark, New Jersey and carrying 143,000 barrels of highly flammable naphtha which it had taken on in Pakistan, while the American ship had unloaded its cargo at Newark and was empty. Another 100 men on the four ships were rescued from the flaming water. The pilots of both tankships (MV Alva Cape and Texaco Massachusetts) were found to be at fault for the collision, although the pilot of the MV Alva Cape was determined to be primarily at fault by the United States Coast Guard.
- Reflecting MSC's concern over several crew-safety factors regarding the suitability of the S-IVB hydrogen tank as a habitable structure to support the spent-stage experiment support module (SSESM) program, Gemini Program Manager Charles W. Mathews requested that officials at Marshall Space Flight Center (MSFC) determine the compatibility of pressurization oxygen with possible out-gassing hydrogen and the possible effects on electrical cabling.
- People's Daily published an even stronger incitement to violence in its editorial "Freely Mobilize the Masses and Thoroughly Knock Down the Counterrevolutionary Black Gangs", calling on China's public to seriously injure or even to kill people identified as part of an anti-government movement.
- The Beatles performed in the studio for the first and only time on the BBC television programme Top of the Pops, the UK's major television pop music show.
- George Abbott and Ginger Rogers hosted the 20th Tony Awards ceremony. Multiple winners included Man of La Mancha and Marat/Sade.
- Born:
  - Jan Železný, Czech javelin thrower who has held the world record for longest javelin throw since 1993; in Mladá Boleslav
  - Phil Vischer, American voice actor, puppeteer, writer, animator, and creator of VeggieTales; in Muscatine, Iowa
- Died:
  - Lew Brice (Louis Borach), 72, American comedian
  - Dantès Bellegarde, 89, Haitian historian

== June 17, 1966 (Friday) ==
- Three people were murdered in the Lafayette Grill at 128 East Eighteenth Street in Paterson, New Jersey. Hours later, police stopped professional boxer Rubin "Hurricane" Carter, who was with a friend in a white car, and, five months later, Carter would be charged, tried and convicted of the triple homicide. For the next 19 years, Carter would remain imprisoned for a crime that he had not committed, until the case would be reopened and the conviction reversed in 1985. Carter, at one time the leading contender for the world middleweight boxing championship, would die in 2014.
- During the Gemini 9A postlaunch press conference with Astronauts Thomas P. Stafford and Eugene A. Cernan, Director Robert R. Gilruth of Manned Spacecraft Center announced that James A. Lovell, Jr., and Edwin E. Aldrin, Jr., would be the prime crew for the last Project Gemini flight, Gemini 12. The backup crew would be L. Gordon Cooper, Jr., and Eugene A. Cernan. The mission was scheduled for late October 1966 or early November 1966.
- Died: Betty Baxter Anderson, 58, American author of the Career Story for Older Girls series of juvenile fiction books

== June 18, 1966 (Saturday) ==
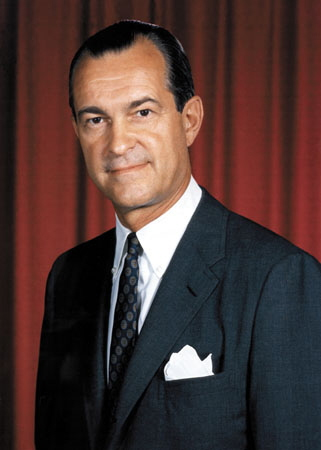
Helms

- The U.S. Director of Central Intelligence, Admiral William Raborn resigned. Raborn's deputy, Richard Helms, was appointed as the new chief of the Central Intelligence Agency and would be confirmed by the Senate and sworn in on June 30. Helms would direct the CIA for almost seven years, serving under President Lyndon Johnson, and then President Richard Nixon, until 1973.
- Three new provinces were created in the Philippines after Kalinga-Apayao (north), Benguet (southwest), and Ifugao (south) were separated from the Mountain Province (Lalawigang Bulubundukin) pursuant to Republic Act Number 4695.
- The Parliament of France passed Law #66–396, granting amnesty for crimes that had been committed during the Algerian War between 1954 and 1962, and the First Indochina War between 1946 and 1954.
- Born: Kurt Browning, Canadian figure skater and four-time winner of the World Figure Skating Championships between 1988 and 1998; in Rocky Mountain House, Alberta

== June 19, 1966 (Sunday) ==
- NASA announced that the Gemini 10 mission had been scheduled for no earlier than July 18, with John W. Young, command pilot, and Michael Collins, pilot, as the prime crew. Alan L. Bean, command pilot, and Clifton C. Williams, pilot, would be the backup crew. Mission plans would include rendezvous, docking, and extravehicular activity. The spacecraft was scheduled to rendezvous and dock with an Agena target vehicle which was to be launched the same day. If possible, Gemini 10 would also rendezvous with the Agena launched in the March 16 Gemini 8 mission.
- Three speedboat racers were killed in accidents during the President's Cup, an annual hydroplane regatta held on the Potomac River. Ron Musson, the defending APBA Gold Cup champion, was driving his recently redesigned craft, Miss Bardahl, at 160 miles per hour (260 km/h) when the boat disintegrated. Shortly afterward, Rex Manchester, ranked second in the United States, was piloting the Notre Dame when it flew off the water, came down next to the Miss Budweiser, driven by Don Wilson, and exploded, killing both men.
- New Zealand drivers Bruce McLaren and Chris Amon won the 24 Hours of Le Mans, even though race officials initially thought that the team of Ken Miles and Dennis Hulme had finished first. Miles and Hulme were preparing to accept the traditional victory bouquets, when the judges announced that they had reversed their decision.
- In one of the largest accomplishments of Christian missionary evangelism in Indonesia, two thousand residents of the remote village of Tigalingga were baptized in a single day. The baptisms were carried out by 15 pastors representing six different Protestant denominations in the Dairi Regency of North Sumatra.
- Marharashtrian leader Bal Thackeray founded the far-right Hindu nationalist political party Shiv Sena, which was named in honor of the 17th-century Emperor Shivaji.
- Born: Samuel West, British actor, son of Timothy West and Prunella Scales; in Hammersmith
- Died:
  - Pierre Montet, 80, French Egyptologist whose excavation of the ancient city of Tanis discovered the tombs of four Egyptian pharaohs Psusennes I (1047–1001 BCE), Amenemope (1001–984 BCE), Shoshenq II (887–885 BCE), and Takelot I (885–872 BCE).
  - Ed Wynn, 79, (born Isaiah Edwin Leopold), American vaudeville, stage, radio, film and television actor

== June 20, 1966 (Monday) ==
- The 1966 Wimbledon Championships began. Manuel Santana of Spain, the eventual men's singles champion, lost the first set of his tennis games against Japan's Isao Watanabe, but won the match when Watanabe was injured and had to forfeit. The next day, the women's singles tournament opened, and Billie Jean King of the United States (listed locally as "Mrs. L. W. King") defeated Scotland's Winnie Shaw in straight sets, 6–2, 8–6.
- By a unanimous (307 to 0) vote, the U.S. House of Representatives approved the Freedom of Information Act, which had been passed by the U.S. Senate in December, despite the efforts of several federal agencies to block the creation of a means for facilitating examination of U.S. government records. President Johnson reluctantly signed the bill into law on July 4, and it would take effect on July 4, 1967.
- Billy Casper won golf's 1966 U.S. Open over Arnold Palmer, with his second spectacular comeback in two days. The day before, Palmer had held a seven stroke advantage halfway through the last of four games before Casper had fought back on the last nine holes to force a 278–278 tie between the men on 72 holes. In the 18-hole playoff, Palmer had a two-stroke lead after 9 holes, but Casper won by 69 strokes to 73.
- President Charles de Gaulle of France arrived in Moscow for an unprecedented ten days of talks with leaders of the Soviet Union. De Gaulle's twin engine Caravelle jet was escorted by seven Soviet jet fighters as it arrived at Moscow, where the President and Foreign Minister Maurice Couve de Murville were greeted by Prime Minister Alexei Kosygin and President Nikolai Podgorny.
- Bob Dylan's seminal album, Blonde on Blonde, was released in the U.S.
- Died: Georges Lemaître, 71, Belgian Catholic priest and astrophysicist who, in 1927, first proposed the idea of the "Big Bang" theory of the origin of the universe.

== June 21, 1966 (Tuesday) ==
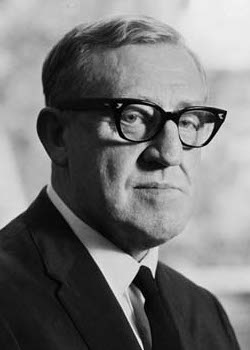
Calwell

- Arthur Calwell, the Leader of the Opposition in the Australian House of Representatives, and the leader of the Australian Labor Party, was wounded in an assassination attempt after he finished a speech at an anti-conscription rally at the Mosman Town Hall in Sydney, Australia. A 19-year-old student, Peter Kocan, approached the passenger side of Calwell's vehicle and fired a sawed-off rifle at Calwell at point-blank range. The closed window deflected the bullet, which lodged harmlessly in Calwell's coat lapel. Calwell himself was only slightly injured, with minor facial lacerations from broken glass. As an author noted later, Calwell had started to roll down his window when he saw Kocan, whom he assumed to be a supporter, running towards his car and, "Had his window been fully down, Calwell would have been killed; only the glass barrier had saved him."
- The film adaptation of Who's Afraid of Virginia Woolf? premiered at the Pantages Theatre in Hollywood, California, days after Jack Valenti of the Motion Picture Association of America (MPAA) gave its approval in spite of the strictures of the MPAA's Production Code, a prerequisite for being shown in most American cinemas. The Mike Nichols film could be distributed as long as the theater operator signed a rider to a standard contract "prohibiting anyone under the age of 18 from seeing the picture unless accompanied by an adult", a forerunner to the "R" Rating that would be implemented as part of the limitations system that would be created on November 5, 1968. The MPAA released a statement at the time noting that "this exemption does not mean that the floodgates are open for language or other material" judged to be obscene.
- "Washoe", a nine-month old female chimpanzee from West Africa, arrived at the home of Beatrix T. Gardner and R. Allen Gardner, two psychology professors at the University of Nevada, Reno. Taught by the Gardners, Washoe would become the first non-human to learn to communicate with humans, learning 350 symbols in American Sign Language.
- Born: Rudabeh "Rudi" Bakhtiar, American newscaster for CNN Headline News Tonight; in Fresno, California

== June 22, 1966 (Wednesday) ==
- The Bail Reform Act of 1966 was signed into law by U.S. President Johnson, who said that the reform of the bail system in federal crimes would open a new area in American criminal justice. "Because of the bail system," Johnson said at the signing, "the scales of justice have been weighted, not with fact, nor law, nor mercy. They have been weighted with money. But now we can begin to insure the defendants are considered as individuals, not dollar signs." Under the new rules, a judge was required to make a presumption in favor of releasing a defendant before trial based on the likelihood that the person would not appear for trial. "The federal Bail Reform Act affected only a small percentage of all criminal defendants in the United States," a legal historian would later note, but "Its real impact was as a national model for the state bail reform laws incorporating the same principle that defendants have a presumptive right to bail. The result was a proliferation of state bail programs involving release on recognizance or 10 percent plans. The impact on local jails was dramatic..."
- Vietnamese Buddhist activist leader Thích Trí Quang was arrested as the military junta of Nguyen Cao Ky crushed the Buddhist Uprising.
- Born: Emmanuelle Seigner, French actress; in Paris
- Died:
  - E. Yale Dawson, 48, American botanist; while diving in the Red Sea
  - Roger Blunt, 65, New Zealand cricketer

== June 23, 1966 (Thursday) ==
- PAGEOS, the Passive Geodetic Earth Orbiting Satellite, was launched into space at 5:12 p.m. from Vandenberg Air Force Base in California with no instruments, designed to serve as an object that was visible with the naked eye from most of the Northern Hemisphere. The 100-foot (30 m) diameter mylar balloon was initially placed in polar orbit at an altitude of 2,600 miles (4,200 kilometers) and served as the first reference point for a network of observatories, to be photographed for use in geodetic triangulation in order to make more accurate mapping of the relative location of Earth's land masses. PAGEOS was observed to be disintegrating on July 12, 1975, and was gone by 1976.
- The fourteenth and final collection of James Bond short stories authored by Ian Fleming was published as Octopussy and the Living Daylights. Fleming, who had created the Agent 007 character, had died in 1964.
- Born: Richie Jen, Taiwanese singer and actor; as Rén Xiánqí in Changhua City
- Died:
  - Paul Cain (George Caryl Smis), 64, American pulp fiction author
  - Hiroshi Shimizu, 63, Japanese film director

== June 24, 1966 (Friday) ==
- The Organization of American States voted, 18–0, to withdraw the remaining 8,000 troops of the international peacekeeping force that had been occupying the Dominican Republic since the civil war in 1965. Of the remaining military forces, 6,300 were from the United States, followed by 1,170 from Brazil and less than 250 each from Honduras, Paraguay, Nicaragua and Costa Rica. Mexico abstained, and five nations (Chile, Peru, Ecuador, Uruguay, and Venezuela) commented that the OAS force troops should never have been there in the first place. The withdrawal resolution came after free elections had been held for a new government that would take office on July 1.
- The United States Senate voted unanimously, 76–0, for the most comprehensive automobile safety laws ever enacted in the U.S., with 26 requirements for all 1968 model vehicles, including lap and shoulder seat belts, rear view mirrors, back up lights, hazard lights, safety door latches, collapsible steering columns, sturdy anchorage of seats, recessed instrument panels, redesign of interior forward compartments to reduce impact, safety glass, hydraulic brakes, roll bars for soft top or open top vehicles, and padded head rests.
- Born: Hope Sandoval, American musician and singer-songwriter; in Alhambra, California
- Died: Otto-Wilhelm Förster, 81, German war hero

== June 25, 1966 (Saturday) ==
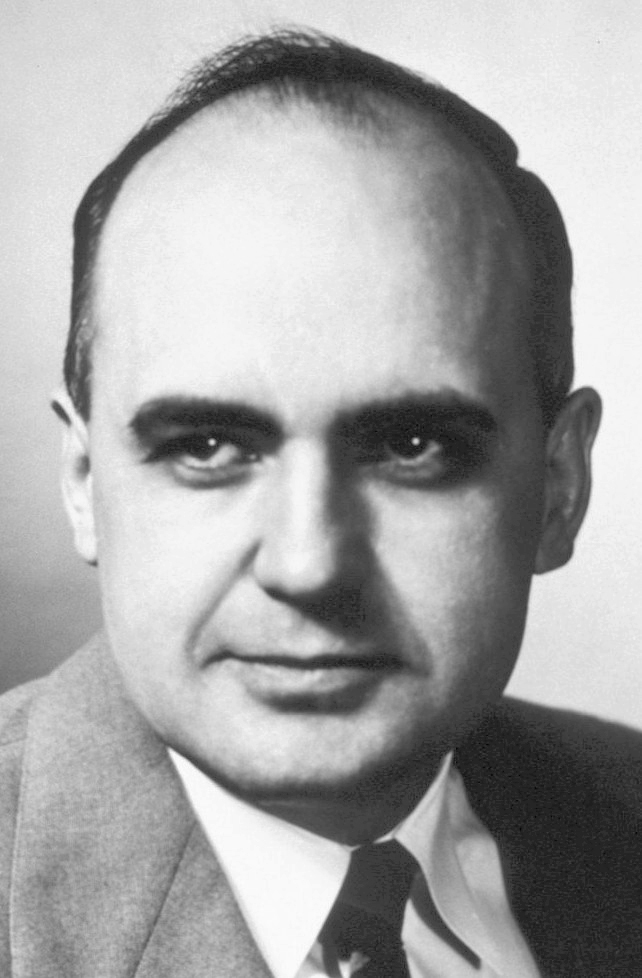
Dr. Hilleman

- Dr. Maurice Hilleman announced the successful testing of the first mumps vaccine, in an address to the American Therapeutics Society in Chicago. The Mumpsvax inoculation had been developed from a strain of the virus that Dr. Hilleman had cultured from (and named for) his daughter, Jeryl Lynn Hilleman, in 1963, and would become the standard immunization for the disease in the United States.
- Billing itself as "the first and only year round, day and night ski resort in the United States", "Ski Villa" opened in the Carbon Canyon, near Chino, California, introducing a substitute for a snowy surface. Over a cement base, millions of interlocking tiles of plastic bristles were laid to create a sufficiently slick surface. Resort developer John Kramer had invested in the project after visiting a similar structure that had operated since 1963 in Japan at Funabashi. However, the experiment would fail after one year, and Ski Villa would close in 1967.
- Yugoslavia became the first Communist nation to enter into a diplomatic accord with the Roman Catholic Church, with Yugoslavia and Vatican City agreeing to exchange representatives. The Holy See would have jurisdiction over the Catholic Church in Yugoslavia on spiritual, ecclesiastical and religious questions, and would in turn restrict its clergy from participating in Yugoslavia's political affairs.
- After 160 years of constructing ships for the United States Navy, the Brooklyn Navy Yard was closed. The increasing size requirements for modern warships after World War II made BNY impractical, because the Brooklyn Bridge and the Manhattan Bridge did not have sufficient clearance to allow newer vessels to pass underneath.
- The British children's comic book Ranger was incorporated into Look and Learn, after a ten-month attempt as an independent publication.
- Born: Dikembe Mutombo, Congolese NBA basketball player and 8-time NBA All-Star who led the league three years in blocked shots and two years in rebounding; in Kinshasa (d. 2024)
- Died: Busher Jackson (Ralph Harvey Jackson), 55, Canadian ice hockey player, 1931-32 NHL scoring leader and 1971 inductee to the Hockey Hall of Fame

== June 26, 1966 (Sunday) ==
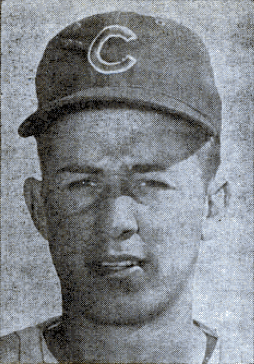
Santo

- Major League Baseball player Ron Santo of the Chicago Cubs was hospitalized after being struck in the face by a pitched ball hurled by the New York Mets' Jack Fisher sustaining the accident that would ultimately lead to the mandatory requirement of the "earflap helmet" in the major leagues. Starting with his return to action on July 4, Santo, who had sustained a broken cheekbone, wore the modified helmet for the rest of his career, and the idea gradually caught on, becoming mandatory in 1983.
- The "March Against Fear", started by one man, James Meredith, on June 6, came to a dramatic climax as more than 16,000 African-Americans (and a few hundred white supporters) arrived at the Mississippi State Capitol in Jackson. Although the Capitol building itself was separated from the crowd by police and National Guardsmen who had been ordered to the area, the group packed the grounds and adjacent areas to hear the speakers. Meredith himself, who had been shot and hospitalized the day after he began his quest, addressed the assembly from a platform on a flatbed truck. "It's true that we got some mean white folks in Mississippi," Meredith told listeners, "but these people can be decent. There is only one thing that is holding them back. And that thing is the system of white supremacy." He noted that he had been shot, "but as you can see here, that didn't end a thing."
- The Communist Party USA (CPUSA) ended its first national convention since 1959, meeting at New York City's Lower East Side, at Webster Hall. Gus Hall, who had been identifying himself as a "party spokesman" for more than five years in order to avoid criminal prosecution as an agent of the Soviet Union, was elected as the CPUSA General Secretary, and Harry Winston was voted the honorary title of National Chairman. Both had served federal prison terms during the 1950s for conspiracy to overthrow the U.S. government.

== June 27, 1966 (Monday) ==
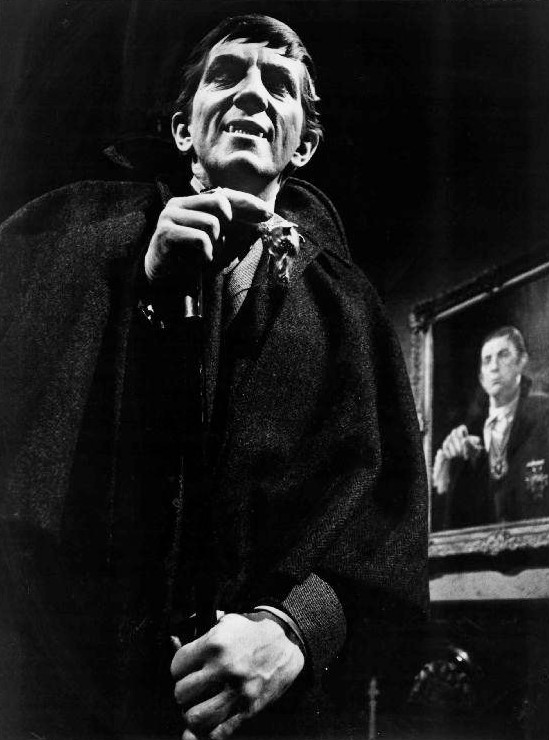
Barnabas Collins (Jonathan Frid)

- Dark Shadows, a daytime soap opera billed initially as "the first television program styled in the tradition of the gothic novel", made its debut on the ABC television network at 4:00 p.m. Eastern time. In the first installment of the "romantic suspense" series, Victoria Winters (Alexandra Moltke) came to the small fishing village of Collinsport, Maine, to become the governess of a 10-year-old boy, and took up residence at a gloomy Victorian mansion, "Collinwood", operated by the Collins family matriarch (Joan Bennett). The show was initially panned by critics but would feature supernatural plots after its first ten months, with ghosts, a vampire (Barnabas Collins), a witch (Angelique) and a werewolf (Quentin), and the setting gradually shifted from the 20th century to the past and the future, including the year 1995. By 1969, Dark Shadows would become the highest-rated daytime program in the United States, running until April 2, 1971.
- Frank Zappa and The Mothers of Invention released their debut album, Freak Out!. Initially, the record album was a commercial failure, but after Zappa's rise to fame, Freak Out! would gain a massive cult following and become a major seller in subsequent years.
- Born: J. J. Abrams, American film and television director, and co-creator of the TV series Lost; in New York City

== June 28, 1966 (Tuesday) ==
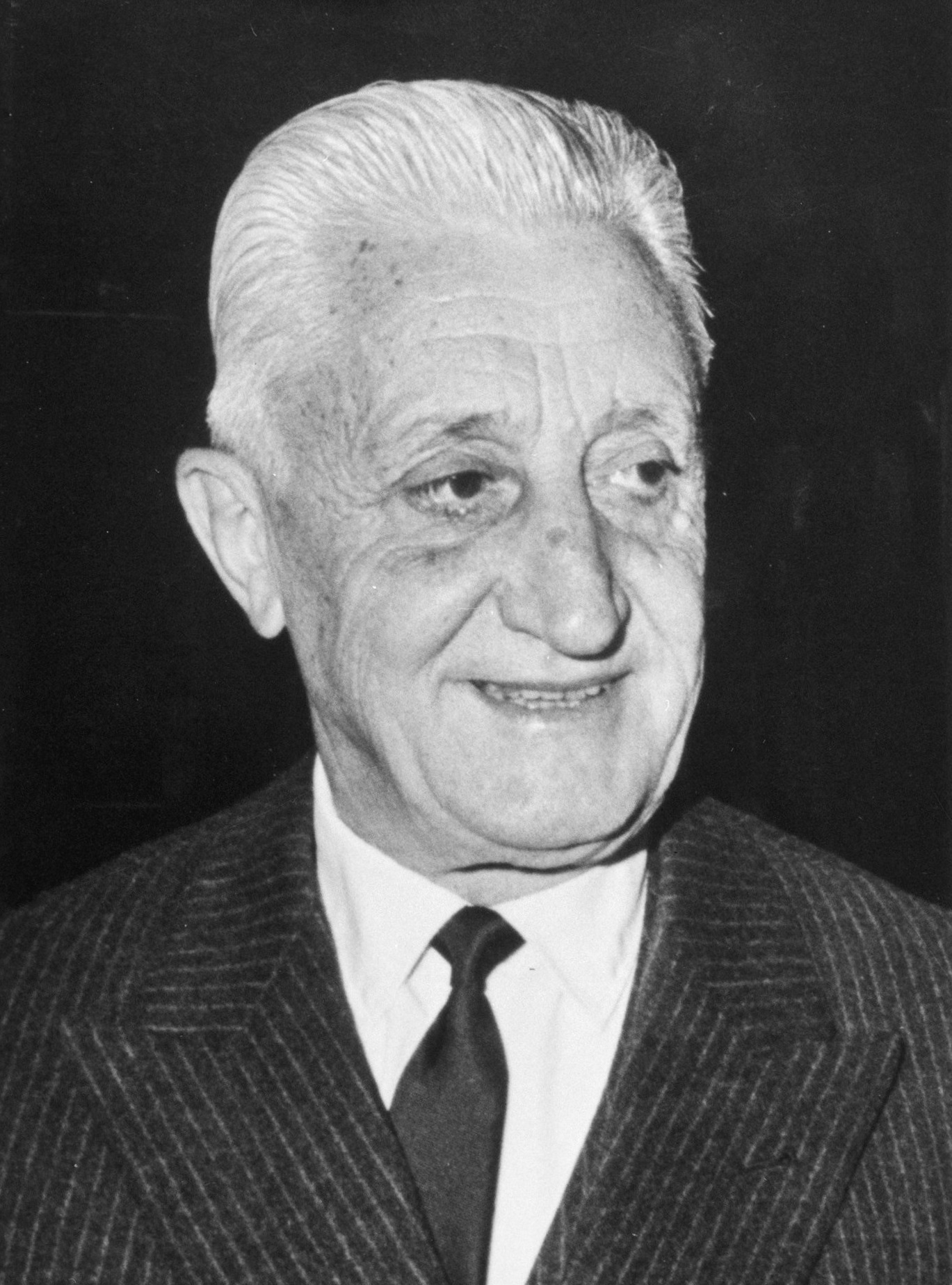
Ex-President Illia

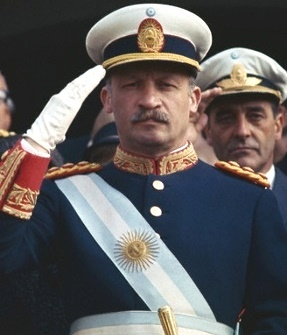
General Ongania

- In Argentina, a junta deposed president Arturo Illia in a bloodless coup and appointed retired General Juan Carlos Onganía to replace him. Dr. Illia, who had refused the day before to resign, quietly left the Casa Rosada and departed for exile in Uruguay. General Ongania and the other junta members (Army Lieutenant General Pascual Pistarini, Rear Admiral Benigno Varela, and Air Force Brigadier General Adolfo Alvarez) said that they acted because President Illia had not been assertive enough against supporters of exiled dictator Juan Peron.
- Edward Z. Gray, Advanced Manned Missions Program Director in NASA HQ, criticized both MSFC and MSC for failing to present a realistic and viable experiment program for the AAP S-IVB Workshop. From the outset, Gray said, all recognized that AAP experiments had to be relatively simple and economical because of the requirement for early delivery of flight-qualified hardware (i.e., the fall of 1967) and fiscal limitations during Fiscal Years 1966 and 1967. The responses from MSFC and MSC so far, he stated, "do not constitute a reasonable program." Gray noted that experiments to assess the habitability of a spent stage (and also to develop design criteria for space stations) were almost totally absent. Several experiments were wholly unrelated to the Workshop and required little or no participation of the crew. "In my estimation we have not faced up to the problem of defining a useful set of experiments", Gray concluded. Unless great effort and imagination were brought to bear on this problem, he warned, "we will be hard pressed to defend the phase D effort on the Workshop which should constitute a key element of our Saturn Apollo Applications Program."
- Parkfield, California, which lies along the southern Calaveras Fault, a branch of the larger San Andreas Fault, was struck by 6.0 magnitude earthquake, its sixth in less than 110 years. Tremors of at least 6.0 had already shaken Parkfield on January 9, 1857; February 2, 1881; March 3, 1901; March 10, 1922; and January 8, 1934.
- An elephant at the Henry Vilas Zoo in Madison, Wisconsin, pulled a three-year-old girl through the bars of its cage and killed her. The child had squeezed underneath a chicken wire restraining fence after deciding to feed popcorn to the elephant.
- The British naphtha tanker Alva Cape, whose cargo had exploded and killed 33 people on June 16, was being unloaded of its remaining volatile cargo when a new explosion killed four more people.
- Born:
  - Mary Stuart Masterson, American film actress (Fried Green Tomatoes); in New York City
  - John Cusack, American film actor (Being John Malkovich); in Chicago
- Died:
  - Mehmet Fuat Köprülü, 75, Turkish scholar and historian
  - Kenneth Miller Adams, 68, American artist

== June 29, 1966 (Wednesday) ==
- At 1:50 p.m. local time, 16 A-6 Intruder fighter-bombers and 12 support aircraft took off from the aircraft carriers Constellation and Ranger to carry out the first American bombing of North Vietnam's largest cities, striking at fuel and oil facilities near Haiphong, the nation's second biggest city. Twenty-five minutes later, at 2:15, the U.S. Seventh Air Force struck at the capital, Hanoi fuel storage tanks with 25 F-105 Thunderchief fighters. However, a CIA report two months later would conclude that the daring raids had escalated the war, but failed to have the expected impact, noting "there is no evidence that the air strikes have significantly weakened popular morale."
- The executives of the National Union of Seamen voted 29–16 to end the merchant seamen's strike that had tied up British harbors for 43 days and left almost 900 ships at anchor. Ships began sailing again shortly after midnight on July 1.
- Philippine Airlines Flight 785 (a Douglas C-47A, registration PI-C17) crashed into a ravine near Sablayan in a combination of bad weather and pilot error, killing 26 of the 28 people on board.
- China tested its first missile capable of carrying a nuclear warhead, though an actual armed missile would not be launched until October 25.
- The first British credit card was introduced, as Barclays Bank introduced the Barclaycard.
- The Roman Catholic Diocese of Buga was established in Colombia.

== June 30, 1966 (Thursday) ==
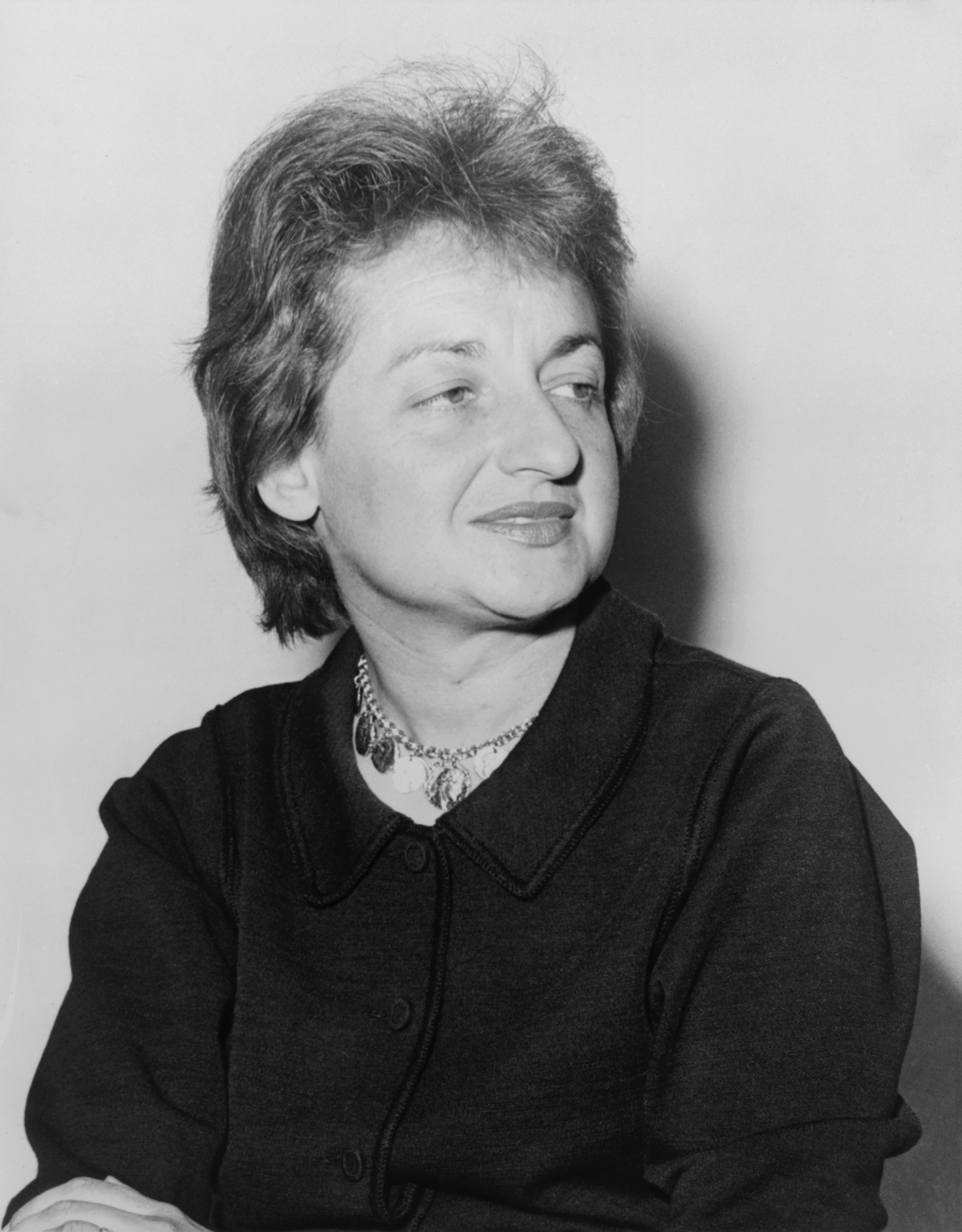
NOW co-founder Betty Friedan

- With the goal of championing the cause of equal rights for women, the National Organization for Women (NOW) was founded in Washington, D.C., at the close of the Third National Conference of Commissions on the Status of Women. Betty Friedan and 27 other women paid the initial annual dues of five dollars to become the first members.
- Australia's semi-decennial census took place. The count at year's end would show that the nation's population was 11,599,498; this showed an increase of almost exactly 10 percent (9.966%) from the 10,548,267 noted in 1961.
- France formally withdrew from the military structure of the North Atlantic Treaty Organization (NATO). On the same day, President Charles de Gaulle signed multiple agreements with the Soviet Union for cooperation in outer space exploration.
- The Beatles performed at Budokan Hall in Tokyo, in the first of five concerts in Japan during a tour of Asia.
- Born:
  - Mike Tyson, American boxer who unified three titles to become the undisputed world heavyweight champion boxer from August 1, 1987 to February 11, 1990; in Brooklyn
  - Marton Csokas, New Zealand film actor in The Lord of the Rings trilogy; in Invercargill
- Died:
  - Giuseppe Farina, 59, retired Italian racing driver and former Formula One World Champion; in a car accident while driving through the French Alps near Aiguebelle.
  - Margery Allingham, 62, British detective novelist who created the Albert Campion series.
