= Edward Carr =

Edward Carr may refer to:

- E. H. Carr (1892–1982), British historian, journalist and international relations theorist
- Eddie Carr (1917–1998), English footballer and manager
- Edward Gary Carr (1948–2009), autism treatment researcher
- Edward Carr (athlete) (1878–1947), American Olympic long-distance runner
- Eddie Carr (Jurassic Park), a fictional character from the film The Lost World: Jurassic Park (1997)
- Edward Arthur Carr (1903–1966), administrator of the Colony of Nigeria
- Eddie Carr (American football) (born 1923), American football defensive back
