= Zmaj (album) =

Studio album by Indira Radić
- Released: December 2003
- Studio: Studio Hit (Belgrade)
- Genre: Pop-folk; turbo-folk; dance-pop
- Length: 37:18
- Language: Serbian
- Label: Grand Production
- Producer: Goran "Rale" Ratković

Indira Radić chronology
Pocrnela burma (2002)	Zmaj (2003)	Ljubav kad prestane (2005)

Zmaj (Serbian Cyrillic: Змај, lit. 'Dragon') is the eleventh studio album by Serbian singer Indira Radić, released in 2003.

== Track listing ==
All lyrics are written by Marina Tucaković; all music is composed by Goran "Rale" Ratković; all production is handled by Ratković.

No.	Title	Arrangement	Length
1.	"Zmaj"	Ratković	3:31
2.	"Moj živote dal' si živ"	Ratković	3:51
3.	"Vatromet"	Aleksandar Kobac	3:35
4.	"Nisam sumnjala"	Ratković	4:07
5.	"Svejedno je"	Ratković	3:58
6.	"Tetovaža"	Ratković	4:16
7.	"Bio si mi drag"	Ratković	3:22
8.	"Tika-tak"	Ratković	3:45
9.	"Zašto tako naopako"	Kobac	3:20
10.	"Pedeset godina"	Ratković	3:33
Total length:			37:18

- "Tetovaža" contains a sample of "Protect the Innocent" (CreamTeam remix; 2002), written by Erwin Spitsbaard, Tom Peters and Viktor van Ophuizen, and performed by the Matrix.
- "Pedeset godina" is an unauthorized Serbian-language cover of "Siga ton antra" ("Σιγά τον άντρα"; 2003), penned by Evi Droutsa, composed by Giorgos Kafetzopoulos, and performed by Peggy Zina.

== Cover versions ==
- Bulgarian singer Magda recorded a Bulgarian-language cover of "Zmaj", titled "Nyamam dusha" ("Нямам душа"). The cover was adapted into Bulgarian by Marieta Angelova and included in Magda's 2004 debut studio album Sluchaen flirt (Случаен флирт).
- Bulgarian singer Ivana recorded Bulgarian-language covers of "Moj živote dal' si živ" and "Pedeset godina", titled "Kato na 17" ("Като на 17") and "Osvobodete dansinga" ("Освободете дансинга"), respectively. The covers were adapted into Bulgarian by Marieta Angelova and included in Ivana's 2004 studio album Nyama spirane (Няма спиране).
- Bulgarian singer Valya recorded a Bulgarian-language cover of "Vatromet", titled "Vlyuben" ("Влюбен"). The cover was adapted into Bulgarian by Marieta Angelova and included in Valya's 2005 studio album Neshto intimno (Нещо интимно).
- Bulgarian singer Veronika recorded a Bulgarian-language covers of "Nisam sumnjala", titled "Greshen san" ("Грешен сън") and "Proizvedeno v Raya" ("Произведено в Рая"; 2005), respectively. The covers were adapted into Bulgarian by Marieta Angelova, with the former being included in Veronika's 2004 studio album Iskam te zavinagi (Искам те завинаги).
- Bulgarian singer Preslava recorded a Bulgarian-language cover of "Svejedno je", titled "Pomnish li" ("Помниш ли"). The cover was adapted into Bulgarian by Lilyana Dimova and included in Preslava's 2004 debut studio album Preslava (Преслава).
- Bulgarian singer Nadya recorded a Bulgarian-language cover of "Tetovaža". The cover, titled "Super e zhivotat" ("Супер е животът"), was adapted into Bulgarian by Marieta Angelova and served as the title track of Nadya's 2004 studio album.
- Bulgarian singer Galena recorded a Bulgarian-language cover of "Zašto tako naopako". The cover, titled "Angel po lice – dyavol po sartse" ("Ангел по лице – дявол по сърце"), was adapted into Bulgarian by Svoboda Daskalova and included in Galena's 2006 debut studio album Galena (Галена).
- While on tour in the United States, Dada Mešaljić performed Radić's song "Zmaj" impromptu at a McDonald's in Florida. Her short performance went viral, which brought her into the limelight of the wider audience. In October 2020, a studio cover version was released.
