= Lepo se provedi =

Studio album by Indira Radić
- Released: 2007
- Recorded: Studio HIT, Beograd
- Genre: Folk, Turbo folk
- Label: Grand Production

Indira Radić chronology
Ljubav kad prestane (2005)	Lepo se provedi (2007)	Heroji (2008)

Lepo se provedi (English: Have Fun) is the thirteenth studio album by the Serbian singer Indira Radić, released in 2007.

== Track listing ==
1. Uzvodno od ljubavi
2. Lepo se provedi
3. Imali smo, nismo znali (duet with Alen Islamović)
4. Upaljač
5. Noćni program
6. Halo srce gde si
7. Ne dolaziš u obzir
8. Ljubavi mrtvorođene
9. Zavodnica
10. Hitna
