= Milenijum =

Studio album by Indira Radić
- Released: 1 December 2000
- Genre: Folk, Turbo-folk
- Label: Grand Production
- Producer: Enes "Endži" Mavrić

Indira Radić chronology
Voliš li me ti (1998)	Milenijum (2000)	Gde ćemo večeras (2001)

Milenijum (English: Millennium) is the eight studio album by Bosnian Serb singer Indira Radić, released in 2000.

== Track listing ==
1. Loše kombinacije
2. Popi jednu
3. Kako može srce
4. Biti ili ne biti
5. Platio si sve
6. Proveri mi proveri
7. Drugarica moja
8. Teško meni bez mene
9. Gledaj me i umri
10. Prevara
