= Gde ćemo večeras =

Studio album by Indira Radić
- Released: 2001
- Genre: Folk, Turbo-folk
- Label: Grand Production
- Producer: Enes "Endži" Mavrić

Indira Radić chronology
Milenijum (2000)	Gde ćemo večeras (2001)	Pocrnela burma (2002)

Gde ćemo večeras (English: Where Are We Going Tonight) is the ninth studio album by Bosnian Serb singer Indira Radić, released in 2001.

== Track listing ==
1. Ko je ona žena
2. Prevaranti
3. Moju ljubav izdao si
4. Vidi šta si sad bez mene
5. Ne boli to
6. Zivot ide dalje
7. Ne pitaj
8. Gde ćemo večeras
9. Idi ljubavi
10. Ima nešto
