= Dada Mešaljić =

Bosnian singer

- Born: Dženada Mešaljić; April 28, 1997 (age 28); Tuzla, Bosnia and Herzegovina
- Genres: Pop-folk, folk
- Occupation: Singer
- Instrument: Vocals
- Years active: 2016-present
- Labels: MIXGY Music Group

Dženada Mešaljić (born 28 April 1997), known by her stage name Dada Mešaljić, is a Bosnian singer. She rose to fame through her participation as a contestant on Zvezde Granda. and for her performances of songs by Indira Radić.

== Life and career ==
Mešaljić was born in Tuzla and raised in the nearby town of Srebrenik. She participated in music competitions including Zvijezda možeš biti ti on Hayat TV, Valentino zvijezde on OTV, and Zvezde Granda in 2016.

While on tour in the United States, Mešaljić performed Indira Radić's song "Zmaj" at a McDonald's in Florida. This performance later went viral.

Dada cites Marija Šerifović as one of her biggest musical influences.

== Discography ==
=== Singles ===
- Sahara (2019)
- Neudate (2023)
