= Voliš li me ti =

Studio album by Indira Radić
- Released: 1998
- Genre: Folk, Turbo-folk
- Label: ZaM
- Producer: Enes "Endži" Mavrić; Zoran Tutunović

Indira Radić chronology
Izdajnik (1997)	Voliš li me ti (1998)	Milenijum (2000)

Voliš li me ti (English: Do You Love Me) is the seventh studio album by Bosnian Serb singer Indira Radić, released in 1998.

== Track listing ==
1. Voliš li me ti
2. Zabranjeno
3. Junačko srce
4. Crne zore
5. Majko
6. Kafana
7. Decembar
8. Spakuj svoje stvari
9. Srce puno otrova
10. Da, da, da
