= Pocrnela burma =

Studio album by Indira Radić
- Released: 2002
- Genre: Turbo-folk
- Label: Grand Production
- Producer: Goran "Rale" Ratković

Indira Radić chronology
Gde ćemo večeras (2001)	Pocrnela burma (2002)	Zmaj (2003)

Pocrnela burma (Serbian Cyrillic: Поцрнела бурма, lit. 'Blackened Wedding Ring') is the tenth studio album by Serbian singer Indira Radić, released in 2002.

== Track listing ==
All arrangements and production are handled by Goran "Rale" Ratković.

No.	Title	Lyrics	Music	Length
1.	"Pocrnela burma"	Zoran Matić	Matić
2.	"Dužan si mi dva života"	Vesna Petković	Goran "Rale" Ratković
3.	"Lopov" (with Alen Islamović)	Marina Tucaković	Ratković
4.	"Izdao me neko"	Stevan Simeunović	Simeunović
5.	"Kaži kako živiš"	Petković	Ratković
6.	"Ratovanje"	Simeunović	Simeunović
7.	"Agonija"	Strahinja Knežević	Ratković
8.	"Preko, preko"	Knežević	Ratković
9.	"Sve su iste pesme moje"	Simeunović	Simeunović
10.	"Uzmi, sve mi uzmi"	Knežević	Ratković

- "Lopov" contains an interpolation of "Mia nyhta mono den ftanei" ("Μια νύχτα μόνο δεν φτάνει"; 2001), written by Sotis Volanis and Panos Kamelis, and performed by Volanis.
- "Ratovanje" heavily samples "Mundian To Bach Ke" (1998), written by Rajinder Singh Rai, Labh Janjua, Glen A. Larson and Stu Phillips, and performed by Panjabi MC.
- "Preko, preko" heavily samples "Du hast" (1997), written by Richard Kruspe, Paul Landers, Till Lindemann, Christian Lorenz, Oliver Riedel and Christoph Schneider, and performed by Rammstein.
