= Robert and Joan Wallick =

Robert and Joan Wallick set a new record flying eastward round the world in June 1966.

Robert Wallick (pilot), an American rancher, and his wife Joan (co-pilot) circumnavigated the world, starting and finishing in Manila, Philippines, covering a record distance (at that time) of 23,629 miles. The flight began on June 2, 1966, and ended on June 7, 1966. It took them 5 days, 6 hours, 16 minutes and 40 seconds to accomplish the flight. They used a twin-engined Beech Baron C-55 called Philippine Baron.
