= Dragalovci =

Dragalovci Dragalovci
- Village
- Location within Bosnia and Herzegovina
- Coordinates: 44.7686°N 17.7803°E
- Country: Bosnia and Herzegovina
- Time zone: UTC+1 (CET)
  - Summer (DST): UTC+2 (CEST)

Dragalovci is a village in the Stanari Municipality, Bosnia and Herzegovina.

The popular singer Indira Radić is from this village.
