= Edward Gary Carr =

Edward Gary Carr (August 20, 1948 in Toronto, Canada – June 20, 2009 in Wading River, New York) was an internationally recognized pioneer in autism treatment research. He applied studies about the functions that self-injurious behaviors served and contributed substantially to the development and refinement of positive behavior support (Carr et al., 2002). In addition, he assessed the benefits of teaching sign language to children with expressive and receptive language disorders as seen in children with autism. He was the Director of the Research & Training Center on Positive Behavior Support for Autism & Developmental Disabilities at Stony Brook University.

== Background information ==
Carr was born on August 20, 1948, in Toronto, Canada. He secured his undergraduate degree at the University of Toronto and graduate degrees from the University of California at San Diego where he was a Woodrow Wilson Fellow, worked briefly at the University of California Los Angeles, and was Medical Research Council of Canada Postdoctoral Fellow at UCLA. He joined Stony Brook University in 1976 as an Assistant Professor and quickly rose through the ranks to full Professor in 1985. He and his wife, Ilene Wasserman, were killed in a car accident on June 20, 2009. He was survived by his only child, Aaron, his brother, Allan, his sister, Rochelle Carr Burns (Stony Brook 2009).

== Early work ==
Early in his career, Carr began examining alternative explanations for why individuals with autism engage in self-injurious behavior (Weiss, 2003), publishing "The Motivation of Self-injurious Behavior: A Review of Some Hypotheses" in the journal Psychological Bulletin in 1977. Over the years he and colleagues continued to research how self-injurious and other problem behavior might be controlled by factors in the children's environments, in effect serving a communicative function (Stony Brook 2009). He and others applied this knowledge to develop and refine the procedures of functional behavior assessment (FBA). The work on humane means of reducing problem behaviors using positive procedures (e.g., antecedent-based or preventative interventions and teaching functional communication skills to replace the problem behavior) rather than aversive or punishment procedures, led Carr and others to develop positive behavior support.

== Later work ==
During his tenure at Stony Brook, Carr authored or co-authored scores of articles, chapters, monographs, and books; mentored many students; worked with organizations in the US and abroad; and founded and directed the Research & Training Center on Positive Behavior Support for Autism & Developmental Disabilities. His many publications include the books How to Teach Sign Language to Developmentally Disabled Children, Communication-Based Intervention for Problem Behavior, and the monograph Positive Behavior Support for People with Developmental Disabilities: A Research Synthesis. In 2003, he completed a study titled Problem Behavior at Home and in the Community: When is it Most Likely to Occur? A Guide for Parents which was partially funded by the Organization for Autism Research. In 2005, Carr was named to the Panel of Professional Advisors of the Autism Society of America (ASA), a national association with 120,000 members dedicated to educating the public about autism. This panel helps set national standards for autism research, as well as practice and policy regarding the care of individuals with autism (Stony Brook 2009).

== Honors ==
Carr was designated Leading Professor by the State University of New York in 2000 and was thrice selected "Teacher of the Year" in the Department of Psychology (2004, 2006, 2008) (Stony Brook 2009).

== Awards ==
Carr received numerous awards in his field including the Applied Research Award for Outstanding Contributions to Applied Behavioral Research (American Psychological Association, 2001) and the Distinguished Research Award for Career Achievement (Association for Retarded Citizens, 1999). A Fellow of the American Psychological Association and past president of the Association for Positive Behavior Support, Carr was named in Who's Who in America (2005) and Who's Who in American Education (2004) (Stony Brook 2009).
