= Edward Arthur Carr =

British colonial administrative officer (1903–1966)

Edward Arthur Carr (7 April 1903 – 5 June 1966) was the Administrator of the Colony of Nigeria from 1947 until his retirement in 1954.

Carr was born on 7 April 1903, the son of Edward Crossley Carr and Lizzie Emila Biggs.

He married Margaret Alys Willson in April 1930.

He joined the Colonial Administrative Service in Nigeria in 1925 and was appointed Administrator of the Colony of Nigeria in 1947. In 1951, he was appointed a companion of the Order of St Michael and St George.

He attended Ermysted's Grammar School, Skipton and Christ's College, Cambridge.

Carr lived in Sandy, Bedfordshire; he died on 5 June 1966.
