= Indira Radić =

Serbian pop-folk singer

Indira Radić Индира Радић
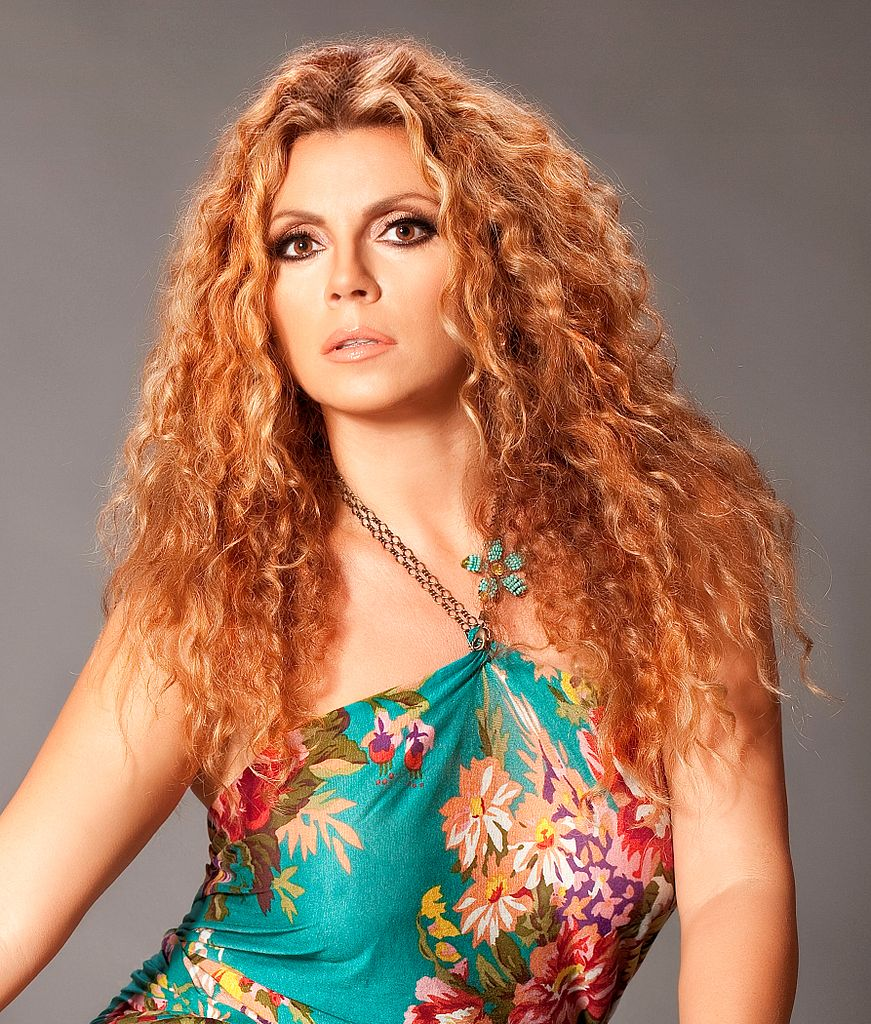
- Radić in 2010

Background information
- Born: Indira Subotić; 14 June 1966 (age 60); Dragalovci, SR Bosnia and Herzegovina, SFR Yugoslavia
- Genres: Balkan folk; turbo-folk; pop-folk
- Occupation: Singer
- Years active: 1991–present
- Labels: Diskos; PGP-RTS; Grand Production; ZaM

Indira Radić (née Subotić; Serbian Cyrillic: Индира Радић, née Суботић; born 14 June 1966) is a Serbian pop-folk singer. She has established herself on the music scene of the former Yugoslavia and Bulgaria and sings almost exclusively in her native language. In the period from 1992 to 2015 she released 16 albums mixing pop, dance and traditional folk elements. This hybrid style, described as pop-folk, brought her success throughout the region with songs like "Ratovanje" that incorporated Indian elements.

== Early life ==
Born Indira Subotić to Bosnian Serb parents Živko Subotić and Rosa Radić in the village of Dragalovci near Doboj, her staunch communist father named her after the Indian Prime Minister Indira Gandhi whose political activity he was reportedly fond of and inspired by. Her mother took care of the household while her father worked as a chauffeur at different local publicly-owned enterprises along with being active in the Communist party's (SKJ) local branch.

Upon completing primary school in the nearby village of Stanari, walking the 5 kilometre distance back-and-forth daily, she enrolled in Doboj's streamlined medical high school to which she also traveled from her home village on a daily basis. Already drawn to singing and entering various vocalist contests, the teenager briefly considered secondary musical studies, however, due to being in no position to move 60 km away to Banja Luka where the nearest secondary musical school was, she instead opted for the medical school in Doboj due to proximity.

Soon after graduating high school, she would find employment in Zagreb, working as a nurse at the Mladen Stojanović Hospital for three years.

== Career ==
=== 1992–98 ===
During the early 1990s, Radić entered a contest for amateur singers and was selected to appear in the final scheduled to be held in Sarajevo. However, this was cancelled as it coincided with the start of the Bosnian War in springtime of 1992. A few months later, Radić contacted the record label Diskos and recorded her first album Nagrada i kazna (Prize and Punishment, 1992) with the band Južni Vetar. After the release of her first album, she moved to Belgrade with her family to build a career. She recorded two more albums with Južni Vetar, Zbog tebe (Because of You, 1993), and Ugasi me (Turn Me Off, 1994), before releasing her first self-titled solo album (1995) on the record label PGP-RTS. It contained the song "Srpkinja je mene majka rodila" (I Was Born to a Serb Mother).

In 1996, Radić met Saša Popović and moved to his ZaM production team where she recorded three albums. First of these was Krug (Circle), which elevated her image. It was followed by Izdajnik (Traitor, 1997) and award-winning Voliš li me ti (Do You Love Me, 1998), which provided Radić with many successful performances and tours.

=== 2000–09 ===
In 2000, Radić continued working with Grand Production (previously ZaM), releasing the album Milenijum (Millennium) that same year and Gde ćemo večeras (Where Are We Going Tonight) in 2001.

A milestone of Radić's career was when she recorded the duet "Lopov" (Thief) with Alen Islamović, a singer of the Yugoslav rock band Bijelo Dugme; the duet was composed and produced by Goran Ratković Rale for her 2002 album Pocrnela burma (My Wedding Ring Turned Black). The duet, which incorporated pop-folk, a mix of folk melodies and Western pop music, has achieved great success.

In 2003, Radić released the album Zmaj (Dragon). It included the songs "Moj živote dal si živ" (My Life, Are You Alive), "Tika-tak" (Tick-Tock), "Bio si mi drag" (You Were Dear to Me) and "Pedeset godina" (Fifty Years) and the title track, among others. The album received numerous awards among which was an Album of the Year, The Hits and Album of the Decade, and Top-selling Album. Her songs from Zmaj were translated into Bulgarian, Romanian, Greek, Albanian and Romani.

In the successor states of Yugoslavia, Radić became initially successful in Bosnia and Herzegovina, Serbia, Macedonia and Montenegro. Radić then went on a Balkan tour. On 27 April 2004, she held her first, and at that time, the most successful concert in show business in Sports Hall in Belgrade.

She was given an award in Bulgaria for being the "most popular and best singer in the Balkans" in 2005. Between 2004 and 2006, Radić had a successful tour and in 2006 received the award for the largest number of concerts held.

Radić released the album Ljubav kad prestane (When Love Ends, 2005), featuring the hit songs "April", "Deset devet tri dva jedan" (Ten, Nine, Three, Two, One) and the title track. It was followed in 2007 by Lepo se provedi (Have a Good Time) with the hit song "Imali smo, nismo znali" (We Had It, We Didn't Know). In 2008, the controversial single "Pije mi se" (I Feel Like Drinking), off the album Heroji (Heroes, 2008), included a music video in which two men were shown kissing. On that same album she sang a duet entitled "Hajde sestro" (Come On, Sister) with singer Ksenija Pajčin. In October that year, she sang the song "Ako umrem sad" (If I Die Now, a song later included on her 2011 album) and in December 2008 she released the full album Heroji. In addition, Indira was declared the Serbian gay icon of 2008.

Title track from album Heroji featured Serbian boxer and IBF champion Nikola Stevanović in her music video in 2008.

In 2009, she received an award for Singer of the Year. In mid-2009, Radić recorded the duet "Možda baš ti" (Maybe Just You) with Ivan Plavšić. The duet's entire proceeds went to charity, and consequently she won the Big Heart Award from Put humanizma (Path of Humanism) and the Princess Katherine Karađorđević Fund. In October 2009, Radić promoted two singles "Pusti me" (Let Me Go) and "Živim da živim" (I Live to Live)

=== 2010–present ===
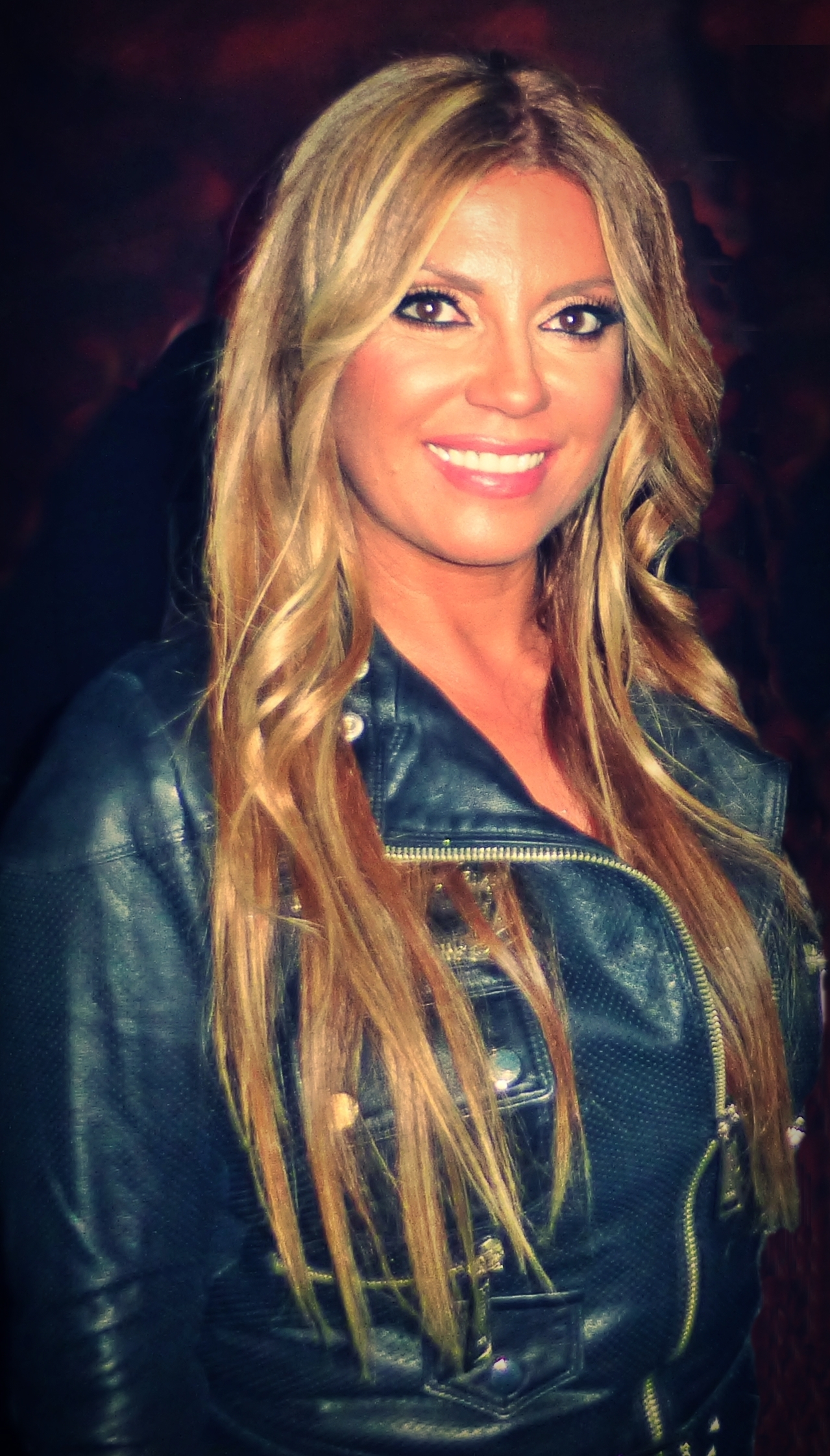
Radić in 2012

In December 2011, Indira released her fifteenth album entitled Istok, sever, jug i zapad (East, North, South and West). The album included 17 new songs including "Marija" (Mary), which Indira recorded in French in a duet with Stanko Marinković.

== Discography ==
=== Studio albums ===
- Nagrada i kazna (Prize and Punishment, 1992) with Južni Vetar
- Zbog tebe (Because of You, 1993) with Južni Vetar
- Ugasi me (Turn Me Off, 1994) with Južni Vetar
- Idi iz života moga (Get Out of My Life, 1995)
- Krug (Circle, 1996) with Srki Boy
- Izdajnik (Traitor, 1997)
- Voliš li me ti (Do You Love Me, 1998)
- Milenijum (Millennium, 2000)
- Gde ćemo večeras (Where Are We Going Tonight, 2001)
- Pocrnela burma (Wedding Ring Turned Black, 2002)
- Zmaj (Dragon, 2003)
- Ljubav kad prestane (When Love Stops, 2005)
- Lepo se provedi (Have a Good Time, 2007)
- Heroji (Heroes, 2008)
- Istok, sever, jug i zapad (East, North, South and West, 2011)
- Niko nije savršen (Nobody Is Perfect, 2015)

=== Compilation albums ===
- Best of Indira (2013)

=== Live albums ===
- Hala Sportova 27.04.2004. Beograd (2004)
- Звезди на сцената - Live (2005) with Ivana

== Sources ==
- Magazin Svet (8 April 2009). "Magazin Svet specijal: Indira Radić". Magazin Svet. Archived from the original on 26 April 2012.
