= Exit (festival) =

Summer music festival in Novi Sad, Serbia

EXIT

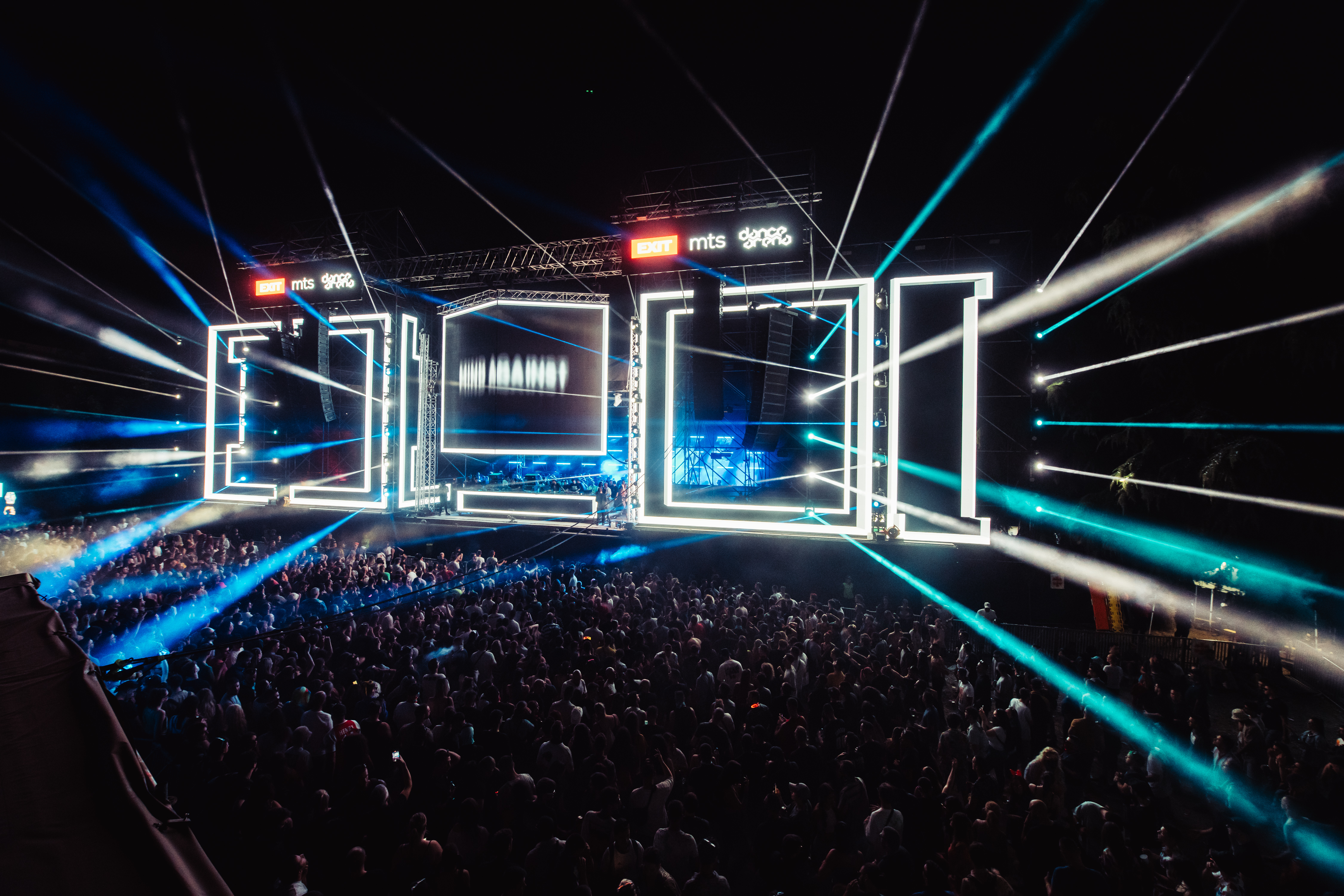
- Genre: Rock, techno, electronic dance music, metal, hip hop, reggae, punk, drum and bass
- Dates: 1–4 July 2027; Four days, starting on the first Thursday of July (2001–present); 100 days, starting 29 June (2000)
- Locations: Petrovaradin Fortress, Novi Sad, Serbia (2001–present); University of Novi Sad Campus, Serbia (2000)
- Coordinates: 45.2500°N 19.8667°E
- Years active: 2000–2025, 2027–present
- Founders: Dušan Kovačević, Bojan Bošković, Ivan Milivojev
- Attendance: 200,000 (2025)
- Capacity: 56,000 (daily)
- Website: www.exitfest.org

EXIT is an annual music festival held in Serbia since 2000. Traditionally staged at the Petrovaradin Fortress in Novi Sad, it has grown into one of Europe’s largest music events, attracting around 200,000 visitors in recent editions.

The festival has won the Best Major Festival award at the European Festivals Awards in both 2013 and 2017, and was named "Best European Festival" at the UK Festival Awards in 2007. In 2018, the Regional Cooperation Council also recognized EXIT as the Champion of Regional Cooperation for 2017, among other awards.

== History ==
The festival was founded in 2000 in Novi Sad, Serbia, as a student movement, fighting for democracy and freedom in Serbia and the Balkans. After the Yugoslavian general election in 2000, EXIT moved from the city's university campus to the Petrovaradin Fortress in the same city in 2001. Nonetheless, social responsibility was still a key aspect of the festival activities. In February 2007, Dušan Kovačević, the festival's co-founder and majority owner, decided to donate the festival to the city of Novi Sad following external offers to purchase the event, with a view to keeping the festival within the city, stating that "because of the wider contribution and conditions under which [EXIT] was created, (...) it cannot be the property of an individual, but of the wider community."

Critics felt that in doing so, management of the festival was given away to the region's ruling political party, which they felt was contrary to the movement upon which the festival was initially based.

In 2007 EXIT won the Best Overseas Festival award at the UK Festival Awards and was voted Best European Festival at the Yourope Awards. It won the Best Major Festival award at the European Festivals Awards in 2013 and 2017. In 2022, EXIT Festival and Tixbase (formerly NFT-TiX) won The Innovation Award at the UK Festival Awards

In 2006, The Observer listed EXIT as its festival pick in its list of top 25 travel experiences. The Guardian listed it in "12 top trips for 2008". The international edition of CNN, CNN World Fiesta, included EXIT on the list of nine best music festivals in the world in 2011. In 2013, Euronews listed EXIT as sixth in its pick of 10 European music festivals. In 2018, BBC News noted EXIT as one of the world's largest music festivals, hosting more than 200,000 people from 60 countries. In June 2019, Forbes published an article claiming that "Thanks to the upcoming EXIT Festival, Serbia is now a new festival hot spot worth your attention".

Superbrands Serbia 2006–2007 listed EXIT as one of seven public urban identity super brands. In March 2018. in Sarajevo, Bosnia and Herzegovina, the Regional Cooperation Council awarded the EXIT Festival as Champion of Regional Cooperation for 2017.

EXIT group organizes nine events in six countries: No Sleep Festival (Belgrade, Serbia) in April and November, Sea Star Festival (Umag, Croatia) in May, EXIT2Montenegro (Ulcinj, Montenegro), EXIT Festival, and Spiral Festival (Żebbuġ, Qawra and Sliema, Malta) in July, Sea Dance Festival (Budva, Montenegro) in August, Get EXITed (Strumica, North Macedonia) and Ada Divine Awakening Festival (Ada Bojana, Montenegro) in September, and Starlight Festival (Giza, Egypt) in November. Previously, EXIT also organized Festival 84 (Jahorina Mountain, Bosnia and Herzegovina), which was cancelled in February 2019 due to administrative reasons beyond the organizers' control, Sunland Festival in Primorsko, Bulgaria in 2021, and Revolution Festival in Timișoara, Romania, which lasted from 2014 to 2019.

Due to the COVID-19 pandemic, festivals organized by the EXIT group in 2020 were postponed until 2021, except for Sea Star, Revolution, and No Sleep festivals, which were postponed until 2022. EXIT Festival, which was initially pushed back to August 2020, was ultimately postponed until July 2021 but held a 4-day semi-virtual edition in September 2020 as part of the global Life Stream project. During the four days, only 250 in-person attendees were allowed each day, while videos of the performances were presented at the end of September to the multi-million audience worldwide through the eight-day-long streaming festival.

In July 2021, the festival became the first major festival to be held in Europe since the beginning of the COVID-19 pandemic, which was reported as a historic moment by leading global media such as Billboard, IQ Mag, Variety and NME. It hosted c. 40,000 attendees per day and took place at the Petrovaradin Fortress, an hour away from the capital, Belgrade.

EXIT Festival 2022, under the slogan "Together. Always!", was held at full capacity compared to the years of the pandemic, across more than 40 stages and zones, and three stages that were improved compared to previous years. Over four days, the festival was visited by about c. 200,000 people, and the main performers were Nick Cave & The Bad Seeds, Calvin Harris, Iggy Azalea, Masked Wolf, ZHU, Sepultura and others.

In November 2022, EXIT announced the next edition of the festival, the theme of which was 'Universe', which was held from July 6 to 9, 2023, at the Petrovaradin Fortress.

In March 2025, organizers told in an interview with IQ Magazine that the 2025 edition may be the last that will take place in Serbia due to the festival's support of the ongoing student protests. Organizers said that they have experienced "mounting pressure and threats aimed at silencing [their] right to free expression". The EXIT team has publicly aligned itself with the protestors and provided them with food, sleeping bags and other necessities. On July 9, the organizers and the media claimed that the next edition of the festival would take place at the Great Pyramid of Giza, although the information was disproved on September 9, with the festival CEO, Dušan Kovačević, stating that, "due to the increasingly frequent dilemmas regarding whether EXIT is moving to Egypt, (...) [they] are creating new festivals, as in previous years", confirming that "there is no possibility that the [EXIT] festival will be held in Serbia [in 2026]", and announcing a "global tour".

On October 29, 2026, Dušan Kovačević, the festival co-founder, confirmed the return of the festival to Serbia and the Petrovaradin Fortress in July 2027, following the Serbian parliamentary elections, which ended the 14-year-long dominance of the ruling party.

== Festival lineups ==
Year	Dates	Attendance	Headliners	Notable acts	Theme
2000	29 June–7 October	N/A	N/A	Darkwood Dub · Orthodox Celts · Eyesburn · Van Gogh · Atheist Rap · Deca Loših Muzičara	Zero Edition of the Festival
2001	6–14 July	150,000	N/A	Banco de Gaia, Luke Slater, Max Romeo, Kosheen, Finley Quaye, Tony Allen, Cubismo, 4hero, Bomb the Bass, Ministry of Sound, Manchild, Bob Sinclar, Darko Rundek, Anastasia, Vlatko Stefanovski, KUD Idijoti, Fluke, Billy Nasty, Van Gogh, Partibrejkers, Rambo Amadeus, Del Arno Band, E–Play, Max Rouch, The Rootsman, Darkwood Dub, Eyesburn, Deca Loših Muzičara, Orthodox Celts, Bentley Rhythm Ace, Negative, Block Out, Atheist Rap, Love Hunters	Noise Summer Fest
2002	5–13 July	250,000	Roni Size b2b LTJ Bukem · Adam F · Eyesburn · Aki Nawaz · Fun-Da-Mental · Atheist Rap · Bad Company · Erick Morillo	Bjesovi, Block Out, Blue States, Brenda Russel, Van Gogh, Veliki Prezir, Will Saul, Goran Bare, Grooverider, Darren Emerson, Darkwood Dub, Darko Rundek, David Morales, Del Arno Band, Derrick Carter, DJ Hype, Eva Braun, Asian Dub Foundation, Električni Orgazam, Andy C, Zion Train, Impact, Jarboli, Krafty Kuts, Cubismo, KUD Idijoti, Let 3, Love Hunters, Marshall Jeferson, Manchild, Nicky Blackmarket, Novembar, Obojeni program, Orthodox Celts, Partibrejkers, Plump DJs, Psihomodo Pop, Rambo Amadeus, Ritam Nereda, Robert Owens, Smoke City, Télépopmusik, Transglobal Underground, Faze Action, High Contrast, Hladno pivo, Horace Andy, Johnny Clarke, Celloman, Džukele	Serbia, Are You Ready for the Future?
2003	3–6 July	220,000	Rollins Band · Tricky · Moloko · Stereo MCs · Dirty Vegas · Chumbawamba · Soul II Soul · Shane MacGowan	Misty in Roots, Pete Tong, Tim Deluxe, Jeff Mills, Rambo Amadeus, Mizar, Roni Size, Prong, Van Gogh	State of EXIT
2004	1–6 July	240,000	Massive Attack · Cypress Hill · Brand New Heavies · Goldfrapp · Kings of Leon (cancelled) · The Stooges	Adam Beyer, Speedy J, Steve Lawler, Soulfly, The Wailers, Peaches, Rambo Amadeus, Partibrejkers, Darkwood Dub, Obojeni program, Adam Freeland, 4hero, Neneh Cherry, Luna, Timo Maas, Sander Kleinenberg, Roger Sanchez, Howie B, X-Press 2, Ken Ishii, Del Arno Band, Eyesburn, Senor Coconut, Satoshi Tomiie, Smokin Jo, Zvonko Bogdan, Way Out West	Stop Human Trafficking
2005	7–10 July	150,000	Underworld · Garbage · Fatboy Slim · The White Stripes · Ian Brown · Slayer · The Datsuns · Arhangel · Laibach	Apocalyptica, Bad Copy, Dubioza Kolektiv, Nitin Sawhney, Overdrive, Ladytron, Edo Maajka, Disciplin A Kitschme, Eyesburn, Freq Nasty, DJ Marky, DJ Patife, Killa Kela, TBC, 2 Many DJs, Felix da Housecat, Dave Clarke (cancelled), Joris Voorn, MC Rage, Valentino Kanzyani, Carl Cox, Evil Nine, Infusion, Danny Howells, Sasha, Lee Burridge, Tom Stephan, BodyRockers, Sandy Rivera, Darren Emerson, Mutiny	Role Model
2006	6–9 July	150,000	Franz Ferdinand · Pet Shop Boys · Morrissey · Billy Idol · HIM	Kelis (cancelled), Dizzee Rascal, The Cult, Scissor Sisters, The Cardigans, Dave Clarke, David Guetta, Derrick May, Hernán Cattáneo, James Zabiela, Jeff Mills, Junior Jack, Kid Crème, Layo & Bushwacka!, Nick Warren, Steve Lawler, Umek, Simian Mobile Disco, James Holden, Steve Angello b2b Sebastian Ingrosso, Switch, Loco Dice, Moonspell, Krafty Kuts & Dynamite MC, Soulfly Jam, Andy C & MCGQ, Suzanne Vega, Rambo Amadeus, Let 3, Massimo Savić, Darkwood Dub, Eyesburn, Kiril Džajkovski w/ Esma Redžepova & Vlada Divljan, Dog Eat Dog, Madball, Neno Belan, Junkie XL, Siddharta, Partibrejkers, Van Gogh, Eyesburn, Block Out, Šaban Bajramović, dreDDup, Kanda, Kodža i Nebojša, Foltin, Kal, Orthodox Celts, Limewax, E-Play, Ritam Nereda, Obojeni program, Marčelo, Félix Lajkó, Garavi Sokak, Zbogom Brus Li, Blla Blla Blla, Slavic Soul Party!, Tamara Obrovac, Slobodan Trkulja, Cubismo, The Beat Fleet, Chicks on Speed, Darko Rundek, LTJ Bukem & MC Conrad (cancelled), DJs Are Not Rock Stars aka Princess Superstar & Alexander Technique, The Streets (cancelled), Goldie, Plejboj, Vlatko Stefanovski Trio	Visa Abolition Campaign
2007	12–15 July	190,000	Danny Tenaglia · Wu-Tang Clan · Strange Sensation · Beastie Boys · Lauryn Hill · Basement Jaxx · Snoop Dogg · LTJ Bukem & MC Conrad	Green Velvet, Frankie Knuckles, Atheist Rap, Beogradski Sindikat, Dža ili Bu, KUD Idijoti, Orthodox Celts, Ritam Nereda, Šaban Bajramović, The Prodigy, Cansei de Ser Sexy, Richie Hawtin, Roger Sanchez, John Digweed, Eric Prydz, Trentemøller, Black Strobe, Paul Woolford, Sébastien Léger, Justin Martin, Groove Armada, Tanya Stephens, Stanton Warriors, The Pipettes, Friction & Dynamite MC, Dubioza kolektiv, Van Gogh, Audio Bullys, Pendulum & MC Verse, Satyricon, Meshuggah, Hladno pivo, Sajsi MC	Tolerance and Diversity
2008	10–13 July	190,000	Sex Pistols · Primal Scream · N.E.R.D · Paul Weller · Gogol Bordello · Gossip · The Hives · Manu Chao · Juliette and the Licks	Afrika Bambaataa, Gentleman & The Far East Band, The Bellrays, Nightwish, Björk (cancelled), The Presets, Roni Size, Sham 69, 2ManyDJ's, Audion, Axwell, Bad Copy, Ben Watt, Booka Shade, Claude VonStroke, Deep Dish, Dillinja, DJ Hype, François K, High Contrast, Capybara, Kruder & Dorfmeister, Laurent Garnier, Let 3, Lollobrigida, Miguel Migs, Lisa Shaw, Ministry, Noisia, Shy FX & MC:SP, Soulwax, Sven Väth, Tiamat, Tiga, Tom Novy, Zdob şi Zdub, The Streets, Bjesovi, Disciplin A Kitschme, Dubfire, Edo Maajka, KUD Idijoti, Marky Ramone, Pekinška Patka, Ritam Nereda, Sharam	Foundation Established
2009	9–12 July	165,000	Arctic Monkeys · Korn · Moby · The Prodigy · Lily Allen · Manic Street Preachers · Kraftwerk · Madness	Sasha b2b John Digweed, Richie Hawtin b2b Dubfire, Steve Lawler b2b Lee Burridge, Eric Prydz b2b Adam Beyer, Carl Cox b2b Green Velvet, James Zabiela b2b Nic Fanciulli, Steve Angello b2b Sebastian Ingrosso, Sander Kleinenberg b2b Darren Emerson, Kissy Sell Out b2b Alex Metric, Patti Smith, Grandmaster Flash, Roots Manuva, Satoshi Tomiie, Fucked Up, Ebony Bones, Loco Dice b2b Magda, The Herbaliser, Majke, Partibrejkers, E-Play, Max Romeo, Hladno pivo, Delinquent Habits, Baloji, Mando Diao, Buzzcocks, Atheist Rap, Buraka Som Sistema, Addictive TV, Trio Mocotó, Cibelle, Amon Tobin, Death Angel, Kataklysm, Keep of Kalessin, The Stone, Anathema, My Dying Bride, dreDDup, Deathstars, Sabaton, Comeback Kid, Walls of Jericho, Hatcha, Fake Blood (cancelled), Surkin, Orgasmic, DJ Marky with MC Dynamite, Heidi b2b Justin Martin, Gui Boratto, Marko Nastić b2b Valentino Kanzyani, Paul Woolford b2b Yousef, Japanese Popstars, Darkwood Dub, Sub Focus, Caspa, Rusko, Overdrive, Andy C, Fabio, Grooverider, Obojeni program, Kenny Kenn, Skibadee, Chase & Status, MC Rage, Takura, Plan B, Dark Angel, Orthodox Celts, Bernays Propaganda, Lollobrigida, Dubioza Kolektiv, zZz, Stalingrad Cowgirls, Jarboli, DJ Marfox, Marčelo, Nežni Dalibor, Vuneny, Love Hunters	Green Guerrilla
2010	8–11 July	165,000	Mika · Placebo · Missy Elliott · Faith No More · The Chemical Brothers	Chromeo, LCD Soundsystem, Yeasayer, DJ Shadow, Suicidal Tendencies, Bad Brains, Miike Snow, Ricardo Villalobos, The Horrors, Does it Offend You, Yeah?, Behemoth, David Guetta, Röyksopp, The Exploited, Klaxons, Pendulum, Black Rose, Boys Noize, Crookers, Daedelus, Erol Alkan, Hudson Mohawke, The Gaslamp Killer, Josh Wink, Moderat, Obojeni program, Brodinski, Dirty South, Kultur Shock, Laidback Luke, Lollobrigida, Midnight Juggernauts, Ms. Dynamite, Ost & Kjex, Riva Starr, Rui da Silva, Solomun, The Twelves, A-Trak, Bonaparte, Busy P, DBridge, DJ Mehdi, Ritam Nereda, We Have Band, Concrete Sun, Plastician, Rustie, Tim Exile, Dargoron, Decapitated, Ex Deo, Ida Engberg, Juvelen, London Elektricity, Repetitor, S.A.R.S., Dozer, L-Vis 1990, MC Dynamite, MistaJam, Papercutz, Sound Pellegrino, Tesla Boy, Veliki Prezir, Bambi Molesters, Bombarder, Consecration, Foreign Beggars, Friction + MC I.D., Rainbow Arabia, Sweet Sorrow	Jubilee
2011	7–10 July	170,000	Arcade Fire · M.I.A. · Jamiroquai · Portishead · Pulp · Editors · Santigold · Grinderman	Deadmau5, Underworld, Groove Armada, Kreator, Bad Religion, Carl Craig, Fedde Le Grand, Digitalism, House of Pain, Marco Carola, DJ Sneak, Paul Kalkbrenner, Magnetic Man, Parkway Drive, Anti-Nowhere League, Partibrejkers, Beirut, Go Back to the Zoo, Discharge, Steve Aoki, Tiga, Seth Troxler b2b Jamie Jones b2b Damian Lazarus, James Zabiela, SARS, Hadouken!, Laibach, Joris Voorn, Arkona, Better Lost Than Stupid, De Staat, Darkwood Dub, Gramophonedzie, Nosaj Thing, Atheist Rap, Maya Jane Coles, DJ Muggs, The Hacker, Digital Soundboy, Danny Byrd & MC Dynamite, Photek, Joachim Garraud, Spy ft. Stamina MC, Mizar, Marsheaux, Alexander Robotnick, Eva Braun, Loefah, Messer Chups, Gesaffelstein, Futurecop!, Oneman, Bok Bok, Superhiks, Jam City, Andraak, Veliki Prezir, Grum, Nežni Dalibor	Loud and Queer
2012	12–15 July	150,000	Duran Duran · New Order · Erykah Badu · Guns N' Roses · Avicii · Luciano · Plan B · Wolfmother	Gossip, Hercules & Love Affair, Richie Hawtin, Skream ft. Sgt. Pokes, Sub Focus & ID, The Toy Dolls, Miss Kittin, Laurent Garnier, Skindred, Sneaky Sound System, Azari & III, Knife Party, Felix Da Housecat, Netsky ft. Dynamite MC, Claude Von Stroke, Little Dragon, MistaJam, Suicidal Tendencies, Buraka Som Sistema, Totally Enormous Extinct Dinosaurs, Thieves Like Us, Hatebreed, Goldie ft. SP:MC, Jacques Lu Cont, Kenny Larkin, Borgore, Brodinski, Drumsound & Bassline Smith ft. Dynamite MC, Benoit & Sergio, Maceo Plex, When Saints Go Machine, Partibrejkers, Eats Everything, Citizens!, Seun Kuti & Egypt 80, D.R.I., Jimmy Edgar, Sodom, Eyesburn, Goblini, Obojeni program, dreDDup, Električni Orgazam, Street Dogs, George FitzGerald, Edo Maajka, Teengirl Fantasy, Detachments, Nikonn, Goribor, Block Out, Pompeya, Mike Mago, DAT Politics	Youth Fair
2013	10–14 July	200,000	CeeLo Green · Atoms for Peace · Bloc Party · Chic · David Guetta · Fatboy Slim · Nick Cave and the Bad Seeds · Snoop Dogg · The Prodigy	Chase & Status DJ Set & Rage, Eric Prydz, Jeff Mills, Steve Angello, Diplo, DJ Fresh, Dubfire, Kerri Chandler, Mark Knight, Pan-Pot, Rudimental (cancelled), SBTRKT, Seth Troxler, Ana Popović, Bad Copy, Bjesovi, Bombarder, Brookes Brothers, Camo & Krooked & Dynamite MC, Cockney Rejects, Čovek Bez Sluha, DBridge, Deca Loših Muzičara, Delilah, Deniz Kurtel, Dixon b2b Âme, Dopplereffekt, Dubioza Kolektiv, E-Play, Eyesburn, Feed Me, Friction & Linguistics, Hornsman Coyote & Balkan Music Box Riddim, Hype, Jah Messenjah, Kate Boy, Lollobrigida, Moonspell, MVP, Orthodox Celts, Pankrti, Piknik, Prong, Rambo Amadeus, Redlight, Repetitor, Sajsi MC, Scuba b2b George FitzGerald, Smoke'n'Soul, The Prototypes, Tom Staar, Van Gogh, Wilkinson & Visionobi, Who See, ZAA, Žanamari & J' Animals	R:EVOLUTION
2014	10–13 July	185,000	Damon Albarn · Gloria Gaynor · Hurts · Pet Shop Boys · Rudimental & Anne-Marie · Skrillex · Stromae · Suede · Afrojack vs Quintino · Carl Cox vs Danny Tenaglia · Deep Dish · Disclosure · Pretty Lights	2Cellos, Adventure Club, Andy C, Asian Dub Foundation, Ben Klock vs Marcel Dettmann, Beogradski Sindikat, Better Lost Than Stupid [Martin Buttrich vs Davide Squillace vs Matthias Tanzmann], Bombaj Štampa, Carl Craig vs Green Velvet, Death Before Dishonor, Disciplin A Kitschme, Dub FX, Dusky vs Paul Woolford, Eats Everything vs Cassy, Gorgon City, Heidi vs Kim Ann Foxman, Jaguar Skills, Maceo Plex vs Danny Daze, Madball, Rundek Cargo Trio, Sabaton, S.A.R.S., Sub Focus DJ Set & ID, The Afghan Whigs, Tiga vs DJ Hell, Van Gogh, Vlada Divljan & Ljetno Kino Big Band, 7 Seconds, Arkona, Atheist Rap, Bernays Propaganda, Birth of Joy, Che Sudaka, Cubismo, Dimension, DMX Krew Live, Fred V & Grafix feat. Dynamite MC, Jackmaster vs Oneman, Jambinai, Kal, Koven Live, Legowelt Live, Love Hunters, Pips, Chips & Videoclips, Quimby, Shadow Child, Tricot	One adventure, two countries, eight days and countless memories
2015	9–12 July	190,000	Capital Cities · Emeli Sandé · Faithless · Hardwell · John Newman · Manu Chao · Martin Garrix · Motörhead	Chris Liebing, Clean Bandit, Dixon, Eagles of Death Metal, Leftfield, Milky Chance, MK, Tom Odell, Adam Beyer b2b Joseph Capriati, Breakage ft. LX One, Dirtyphonics, Duško Gojković & Big Band RTS, Eyesburn, Fear Factory, Francesca Lombardo, Goblini, Goldie ft. MC Lowqui, Hannah Wants, Hladno pivo, Hudson Mohawke, Idiotape, Just Blaze, Kanda, Kodža i Nebojša, Klangkarussel, Kolja i Grobovlasnici, Kölsch, Kove, Lola Marsh, Napalm Death, Nicole Moudaber, Nuclear Assault, Octave One Live, Oliver Heldens, Rambo Amadeus, Roni Size Reprazent, Sajsi MC, Simian Mobile Disco b2b Roman Flügel, Tale Of Us, Terror, Zomboy	15 Years of Sharing Love
2016	7–10 July	195,000	The Prodigy · Bastille · David Guetta · Ellie Goulding · Parliament Funkadelic · The Vaccines · Wiz Khalifa	Dimitri Vegas & Like Mike, Gramatik, Maceo Plex, Nicky Romero, Nina Kraviz, Richie Hawtin, Robin Schulz (cancelled), Oliver Heldens, Stormzy, Tinariwen, Dave Clarke, Hot Since 82 (cancelled), Jackmaster, Marco Carola, Solomun, Sigma, Wilkinson ft. MC Ad-Apt, Anti-Flag, At The Gates, Bad Copy, Božo Vrećo & Halka, Congo Natty, Cock Sparrer, Disciples, Disciplin A Kitschme, DJ Hype, Dub Pistols, Feder, Hernán Cattáneo b2b Henry Saiz, James Zabiela, Josipa Lisac, Kensington, Kultur Shock & Edo Maajka, Kris Kross Amsterdam, Modestep, Moritz von Oswald, Ms. Dynamite, My Baby, Paradise Lost, Raised Fist, René LaVice, Sam Feldt, Teddy Killerz, The Hacker, Urban & 4, Atheist Rap, Balkanika, Graham Candy, Lollobrigida, Repetitor, Ritam Nereda, Who See	Magic
2017	5–9 July	215,000	The Killers · Jason Derulo · Liam Gallagher · Years & Years · Alan Walker · Hardwell · Jake Bugg · Rag'n'Bone Man · Róisín Murphy · The Jesus and Mary Chain · Duke Dumont · Jeff Mills · Nina Kraviz · Paul Kalkbrenner · Solomun b2b Dixon	Black Coffee, Black Sun Empire ft. 2 Shy MC, Jamie Jones, Robin Schulz, Nicole Moudaber, Booka Shade, Ellen Allien, Paula Temple b2b Rebekah, Faithless, Hot Since 82, Lost Frequencies, Mashrou' Leila, Noisia, Recondite, Rüfüs, Angelic Upstarts, Arkona, Bad Company ft. Messy MC, Charlotte de Witte, Destruction, Discharge, Edo Maajka, First Blood, Foreign Beggars, Fred V & Grafix, FuntCase, Massimo, Kungs, Princess Nokia, Ratos de Porão, Red Axes, Teachers, Samael, The Black Dahlia Murder, The Damned, Vatican Shadow, Van Gogh, Zabranjeno Pušenje, Zvonko Bogdan, Bjesovi, Del Arno Bend, Obojeni program, Orthodox Celts, Pips, Chips & Videoclips, The Bambi Molesters, Vizija	Summer of Love
2018	12–15 July	200,000	David Guetta · French Montana · Grace Jones · Martin Garrix · Migos · Alice Merton · Fever Ray · Jax Jones · LP · Ofenbach · Ziggy Marley · Adam Beyer b2b Ida Engberg · Carl Craig · Guy Gerber · Joseph Capriati · Maceo Plex · Nina Kraviz · Richie Hawtin · Solomun · Tale Of Us	Amelie Lens, Asian Dub Foundation, Ben Klock, Boris Brejcha, Burak Yeter, Cockney Rejects, Daniel Avery, Delta Heavy ft. MC Ad-Apt, Disciples, Dog Eat Dog, Helena Hauff, Kölsch, Madball, Mahmut Orhan, Sevdaliza, Slaves, Zhu, Asphyx, Bad Copy, Bajaga i Instruktori, Bojana Vunturišević, Brujeira, Craig Richards b2b Nicolas Lutz, Elderbrook, Goblini, Grave Digger, Idles, Kala, Knuckledust, Lego, Loadstar, Matrix & Futurebound ft. Messy MC, Midland, My Baby, Red Axes, Ritam Nereda, Skyforger, Slapshot, Sunshine, The Adolescents (cancelled), Vatra, Vertex, Atheist Rap, Đorđe Miljenović, Mud Factory	Freedom
2019	4–7 July	200,000	The Cure · Carl Cox b2b Maceo Plex · The Chainsmokers · Chase & Status · Paul Kalkbrenner · DJ Snake (cancelled) · Mahmut Orhan · Greta Van Fleet · Solomun b2b Tale Of Us · Tom Walker · Dimitri Vegas & Like Mike · Skepta · Jeff Mills · Amelie Lens · Desiigner	Charlotte de Witte, Lost Frequencies, Boris Brejcha, Peggy Gou, Sofi Tukker (cancelled), Philip H. Anselmo & The Illegals, Whitechapel, Atheist Rap, Blawan, Dub FX, IAMDDB, Lee Burridge, Sébastien Léger, GRiZ, Tarja, 65daysofstatic, Bad Copy, Filatov & Karas, Monika Kruse, Peter and the Test Tube Babies, The Selecter, Arcturus, Partibrejkers, Ritam Nereda, Who See, Adriatique, Buč Kesidi, DVS1, Eyesburn, Frenkie, Kontra, Indigo, Spermbirds, Total Chaos, Van Gogh, Entombed A.D., Soilwork, Zvonko Bogdan, Booze & Glory, Das Ich, Fa11out, Grade 2, Raiven, Vitamin X, October Tide, Kal, Sixth June	Tribe
2020 (cancelled)	9–12 July (postponed) 13–16 August (cancelled)	N/A	Amelie Lens · Artbat · Black Coffee · Boris Brejcha · Maceo Plex b2b Tale Of Us · Nina Kraviz · Ofenbach · Paul Kalkbrenner · Robin Schulz · Solomun · David Guetta · DJ Snake · Tyga · James Arthur · Fatboy Slim · Metronomy · Sepultura · Sheck Wes	Burak Yeter, Dax J b2b Kobosil, DJ Regard, Goblini, Juliana Huxtable, Laibach, Marcel Dettmann, Massimo, Meduza, Obojeni program, Roni Size b2b LTJ Bukem ft. Dynamite MC, M.O.D., Marky Ramone, Kosheen, Zhu, Agnostic Front, Bury Tomorrow, Crippled Black Phoenix, Death Before Dishonor, She Past Away, Moscow Death Brigade, Nervosa, Overdrive, Rattus, E-Play, Love Hunters	Celebrating 20 Years!
2020 (semi-virtual festival)	3–6 September	1,000	Adam Beyer · Black Coffee (virtual) · Carl Cox (virtual) · Charlotte de Witte · Hot Since 82 · Nina Kraviz (virtual) · Ofenbach · Paul van Dyk (virtual)	Ben Klock, Burak Yeter, Mahmut Orhan, Marcel Dettmann	Life Stream
2021	8–11 July	180,000	DJ Snake · Amelie Lens · Charlotte de Witte · Tyga (cancelled) · Sabaton · Paul Kalkbrenner · Maceo Plex · Pan-Pot · Robin Schulz · Asaf Avidan · Boris Brejcha (cancelled) · Nina Kraviz · Paul van Dyk · David Guetta · Eric Prydz b2b Four Tet (cancelled) · Solomun · Artbat · Jonas Blue · Sheck Wes · Sepultura (cancelled)	Buč Kesidi, Hladno pivo, Metronomy (cancelled), Roni Size ft. Dynamite MC, LTJ Bukem (cancelled), Senidah, Goblini, Topic, Van Gogh, Honey Dijon (cancelled), Hot Since 82 (cancelled), Meduza, Laibach, Massimo, Rundek & Ekipa, Fran Palermo, Amira Medunjanin, Atheist Rap, Eelke Kleijn, Obojeni program, Sama` Abdulhadi, Sunshine, Ajs Nigrutin & Timbe, Ida Prester + Lollobrigida, Juliana Huxtable, Love Hunters, Overdrive, E-Play, Hornsman Coyote, Koven, Mud Factory, Sajsi MC, Marky Ramone (cancelled)	Celebrate Life
2022	7–10 July	200,000	Afrojack · Iggy Azalea · Nick Cave and the Bad Seeds · Calvin Harris · James Arthur (cancelled) · Jax Jones · Napalm Death · Adam Beyer b2b Enrico Sangiuliano · Maceo Plex · Masked Wolf · Boris Brejcha · Disciples · Ofenbach · Alok · Artbat · Monolink · Sepultura · Stephan Bodzin · Zhu	Anfisa Letyago, ANNA b2b Sama` Abdulhadi, ATB, Noisia, Reinier Zonneveld, Senidah, Molchat Doma, Honey Dijon, Acraze, Blond:ish, Blind Channel, Joel Corry, Kalush Orchestra (cancelled), Konstrakta, Marky Ramone, Indira Paganotto, Mathame, Mochakk, Discharge (cancelled), Shouse, The Exploited, She Past Away, Back to the Future Showcase, Incantation, MDB, Mose ft. Sam Garrett, Bojana Vunturišević, Marčelo, Pocket Palma, Praful, Stole x Phat Phillie, Billain, Bury Tomorrow (cancelled), Djaikovski, Grše, Nervosa, Tankard, Shining, Tam, Vuča (Darkwood Dub), Šank, Amajlija, Deca Loših Muzičara, Hornsman Coyote DJ Set, Iva Lorens, Sajsi MC, The Undertones, Joker Out, Orthodox Celts	Together. Always!
2023	6–9 July	200,000	The Prodigy · Skrillex · Eric Prydz · Alesso · Rico Nasty (cancelled) · Wu-Tang Clan · Chase & Status · Dimitri Vegas & Like Mike	Amelie Lens, Nina Kraviz, Indira Paganotto, Viagra Boys, Camelphat, Epica, Burak Yeter, LF System, Claptone, Hot Since 82, Senidah, Sofi Tukker, Vintage Culture, Ben Böhmer, Dry Cleaning, Keinemusik, Mahmut Orhan, Onyx, Avalon Emerson, Ignite, Krystal Klear, Partiboi69, Wolfbrigade, Cockney Rejects, Exciter, Grše, Massacre, State of Mind, The Toasters, Ploho, Rudeboy plays Urban Dance Squad ft. DJ DNA, Aigel, Sajsi MC, Tam, Bojana Vunturišević, Jade, Sacred Reich (cancelled), Atheist Rap, Bombarder, Del Arno Band, Hornsman Coyote, Laura Escudé, Smoke Mardeljano & Ajs Nigrutin	Universe
2024	10–14 July	210,000	Burak Yeter & Dimash Qudaibergen · Baby Lasagna · Whyte Fang · Gucci Mane · Carl Cox · Black Eyed Peas · Artbat · Alok · Argy b2b Vintage Culture · Oliver Tree · John Newman · Maceo Plex · Kenya Grace · Tom Morello · Black Coffee · Steve Angello · Ofenbach	Klangkuenstler, Rudimental, Azahriah, Altin Gün, Bonobo, Cavalera, Helena Hauff, Kobosil, Sara Landry, Luke Black, Teya Dora, Dub FX, Henry Saiz, Sama` Abdulhadi, The Casualties, Villagers of Ioannina City, Yotto, Coroner, Joker Out, Conflict, Ratos de Porão, Sam Divine, Hannah Wants (cancelled), The Exploited, Urban & 4, Willy William, Barry Can't Swim, Flava D, Eyesburn (cancelled), Ritam Nereda, Tam, Edo Maajka, Nika Turković, Filip Baloš, Grše, Ida Prester & Lollobrigida, Iva Lorens, Marčelo, Ancient, Bad Copy, Sajsi MC, Schirenc plays Pugnent Stench, The Stone, Billain, Hornsman Coyote	Starseeds
2025	10–13 July	200,000	Tiësto · The Prodigy · Solomun · Sex Pistols feat. Frank Carter · Eric Prydz · DJ Snake · Amelie Lens · Nina Kraviz · Yousuke Yukimatsu · Hot Since 82 · Hurts · Loreen (cancelled) · Mau P · Boris Brejcha · Indira Paganotto b2b Sara Landry	The Boomtown Rats, Gala, Total Chaos, Perkele, Burak Yeter, Coby, Krisiun, Partibrejkers, Asphyx, Bojana Vunturišević, Fish56Octagon, Gloryhammer, Goblini, Hiljson Mandela, Amna & Seka Aleksić, Atheist Rap, Kanda, Kodža i Nebojša, Kendi, Luke Black, Ritam Nereda, Sunshine, Marko Louis, Marčelo & Nensi, Pekinška Patka, Džoni Midnajt Trio, Heavy Lungs, Hornsman Coyote, Impiety	25 years of LEGACY
2026	Not held due to political pressure				
2027	1–4July	TBD	TBA	TBA	Homecoming

== See also ==
- List of rock festivals
