= Green Fest (Serbia) =

Musical event in Siberia, Russia

- Green Fest logo
- Genre: Rock; pop
- Location: Serbia
- Years active: 2007–2009

Green Fest was an annual single day musical event held in Serbia.

Conceived as a local arm of the Carlsberg Group's Tuborg GreenFest summer concert series across Eastern Europe, Serbian Green Fest is organized by the same group of individuals who are behind EXIT. Danish conglomerate Carlsberg Group finances the event through its local arm Carlsberg Srbija.

== 2007 ==
The inaugural Green Fest in Serbia took place on 26 June 2007 in the town of Inđija before some 100,000 people, most of whom came to see the headliners of the night Red Hot Chili Peppers as part of their Stadium Arcadium World Tour. Other performers on the bill that day were Edo Maajka, Ritam Nereda, and Kasabian.

== 2008 ==
The event's second edition took place on Wednesday 2 July 2008 at the Belgrade Arena with Serbian band E-Play, and Danish act The Raveonettes taking the stage, followed by Cypress Hill, and the night's headliners Franz Ferdinand.

== 2009 ==
For the third edition of the festival, the announced headliners were Depeche Mode, which were scheduled to perform 20 May 2009, as a part of their Tour of the Universe. The festival was to be held in Belgrade, on the Sava and Danube confluence, but the performance, and several other on the tour, was canceled due to Dave Gahan's health problems. The third edition of the festival was canceled.
