= Artbat =

Ukrainian musical duo

- Origin: Kyiv, Ukraine
- Genres: Techno; progressive house; electro house; Dutch house; big room house; trance
- Years active: 2014–present
- Members: Artur Kryvenko; Vitaliy "Batish" Limarenko

Artbat (stylized in all uppercase) is a Ukrainian DJ and music production duo from Kyiv, consisting of Artur Kryvenko and Vitaliy "Batish" Limarenko. They produce music in various techno and house variations.

== Career ==
Artbat's career began in 2014 when Kryvenko and Lamarenko, both experienced DJs, met in a Ukrainian club. After they quickly recognized musical similarities, they started producing music together. Just three months later, they had their breakthrough with the track "Mandrake". They received great support from the British DJ Richie Hawtin, who played the track in each of his sets for a year.

In 2017, Artbat's track uplift was published as part of a compilation on Solomun's label Diynamic, followed by further EPs and tracks on the label. Their track "Taboo", released in 2018, reached the top position of the deep house charts on the music platform Beatport and was able to stay there for eleven weeks. In 2019 they won a DJ Award in the Breakthrough category. In the same year they became the best-selling artist on Beatport.

Artbat was recognized as the Breakthrough Artist of the Year by The DJ Awards in 2019. That same year they were named Mixmag's Stars of the Year and Beatport's Best Sellers.

In 2021, Artbat launched their record label, Upperground, with the release of their single, Flame. The label has hosted several large-scale events featuring its core artists alongside notable performers such as Armin van Buuren, Benny Benassi, CamelPhat, Miss Monique, MORTEN and Vintage Culture.

On November 11, 2023, Artbat recorded their first ever Essential Mix for BBC Radio 1.

In May 2024, Artbat’s official remix of "Hey Boy Hey Girl" by The Chemical Brothers was released by Virgin/Positiva. That month, they held a historic concert at Real Madrid's Santiago Bernabéu Stadium in May 2024, with 8,000 people attending.

In 2025, they managed to record their first ever appearance on the annual Top 100 DJs list by DJ Mag, debuting at No. 73.

Artbat have performed at major festivals such as Coachella, Creamfields, Ultra Miami and Japan, EDC, Awakenings, Tomorrowland, Mysteryland, EXIT Festival, DGTL and Time Warp.

== Discography ==
=== EPs ===
- 2017: Trip
- 2018: Planeta
- 2019: Upperground

=== Singles ===
- 2015: Mandrake
- 2015: Walking (with YanQ)
- 2016: Saltation (with Definition)
- 2016: Chivvy/Momentum
- 2016: Zing
- 2016: Inside (with Definition)
- 2017: Strap (feat. Haptic)
- 2017: Tabu
- 2018: Papillon
- 2019: Apollo 11 (with Matador)
- 2019: Montserrat/ Closer (with WhoMadeWho)
- 2019: Aquarius
- 2020: For a Feeling (feat. Rhodes ) (with CamelPhat)
- 2020: Best of Me (with Sailor & I)
- 2021: Flame
- 2021: Horizon
- 2022: Age of Love (ARTBAT Rave Mix) (with Pete Tong)
- 2022: Our Space and Fading(with Dino Lenny)
- 2022: Origin (with Shall Ocin & Braev)
- 2022: It's ours (with David Guetta & Idris Elba)
- 2022: Tibet (with Argy & Zafrir)
- 2023: Dreamcatcher (with Fred Lenix)
- 2023: Breathe In (with Another Life)
- 2023: Remember
- 2024: In Your Arms (with Another Life & CAY (DE))
- 2024: Take Off (with Armin van Buuren)
- 2024: Hey Boy Hey Girl (remix) for The Chemical Brothers)
- 2024: Pull Out (with Losless & Kas:st)
- 2024: The Ocean (with Avalon Rockston)
- 2025: Love Is Gonna Save Us (with Benny Benassi)
- 2025: The Spot (with Joa)
- 2025: Galaxy
- 2025: Dance
- 2026: Fight Machine (with R3hab, Stylo, Eli & Danny and NAIIM)
- 2026: Break the Loop (w/ Giuseppe Ottaviani & Conor Ross)
- 2026: Dramma (w/ R3hab)

=== Remixes ===
- 2016: Definition - Come Down ft. Liu Bei
- 2019: Monolink - Return to Oz
- 2020: Sono - Keep Control
- 2020: CamelPhat & Yannis - Hypercolour
- 2021: Röyksopp - What Else Is There?
- 2022: Marc Romboy & Stephen Bozdin - Atlas (Remix with Shall Ocin)
- 2023: Kölsch - All That Matters ft. Troels Abrahamsen
- 2024: MEDUZA - Friends
- 2024: The Chemical Brothers - Hey Boy Hey Girl
- 2024: HUGEL, Topic & Arash - I Adore You (ft. Daecolm)
- 2025: The Temper Trap - Sweet Disposition
- 2025: CamelPhat & Elderbrook - Cola
- 2025: BLOND:ISH & Zeeba - Different Way
- 2026: Gotye featuring Kimbra - Somebody That I Used to Know (Artbat & David Guetta Mix)
