= Radislav Jovanov Gonzo =

Croatian music video director and cinematographer

- Born: 9 August 1964 (age 61); Zagreb, SR Croatia, SFR Yugoslavia
- Occupation: Film director
- Years active: 1988–present

Radislav Jovanov (born 9 August 1964), also known as Gonzo, is a Croatian music video director and cinematographer.

== Biography ==
Jovanov was born in Zagreb. After graduating from high school, he worked for several years as a photographer for Polet, a popular student newspaper, and then as a camera assistant at the Radiotelevision Zagreb, working on a number of documentaries, TV films and TV series. At the same time, Jovanov studied cinematography at the Academy of Dramatic Art, University of Zagreb.

Jovanov's first music video was award-winning "Leteći odred" for Psihomodo Pop in 1988. After he left his television job in 1993, he became a professional music video director. He has directed more than 350 music videos for various Croatian pop and rock artists such as Majke, The Bambi Molesters, Let 3, The Beat Fleet, Pips, Chips & Videoclips, Severina, Oliver Dragojević, E.N.I., Hladno pivo, Natali Dizdar, Gibonni, Nina Badrić and Colonia. Most of his videos are edited by his wife Anita.

Jovanov is a ten-time winner of Porin Award for the Best Video: "Starfucker" for Psihomodo Pop (1996), "Mene ne zanima" for Majke (1997), "Apokalipso" for Darko Rundek (1998), "Ay Mi Cuba" for Cubismo (2001), "Ero s onoga svijeta" for Let 3 (2006), "Dijete u vremenu" for Let 3 (2007), "Smak svita" for The Beat Fleet (2008), "Donna" for Psihomodo Pop (2014), "Bejbi" for Psihomodo Pop (2015), and "Ima ih" for Rundek Cargo Trio (2016).

Apart from his music video work, Jovanov directed Cubismo turismo (2000), a documentary about Cubismo, a Croatian Latin American music band, and worked as a cinematographer on two feature films, Spare Parts by Damjan Kozole (2003) and Life Is a Trumpet by Antonio Nuić (2015).
