= Moscow Death Brigade =

Russian music group

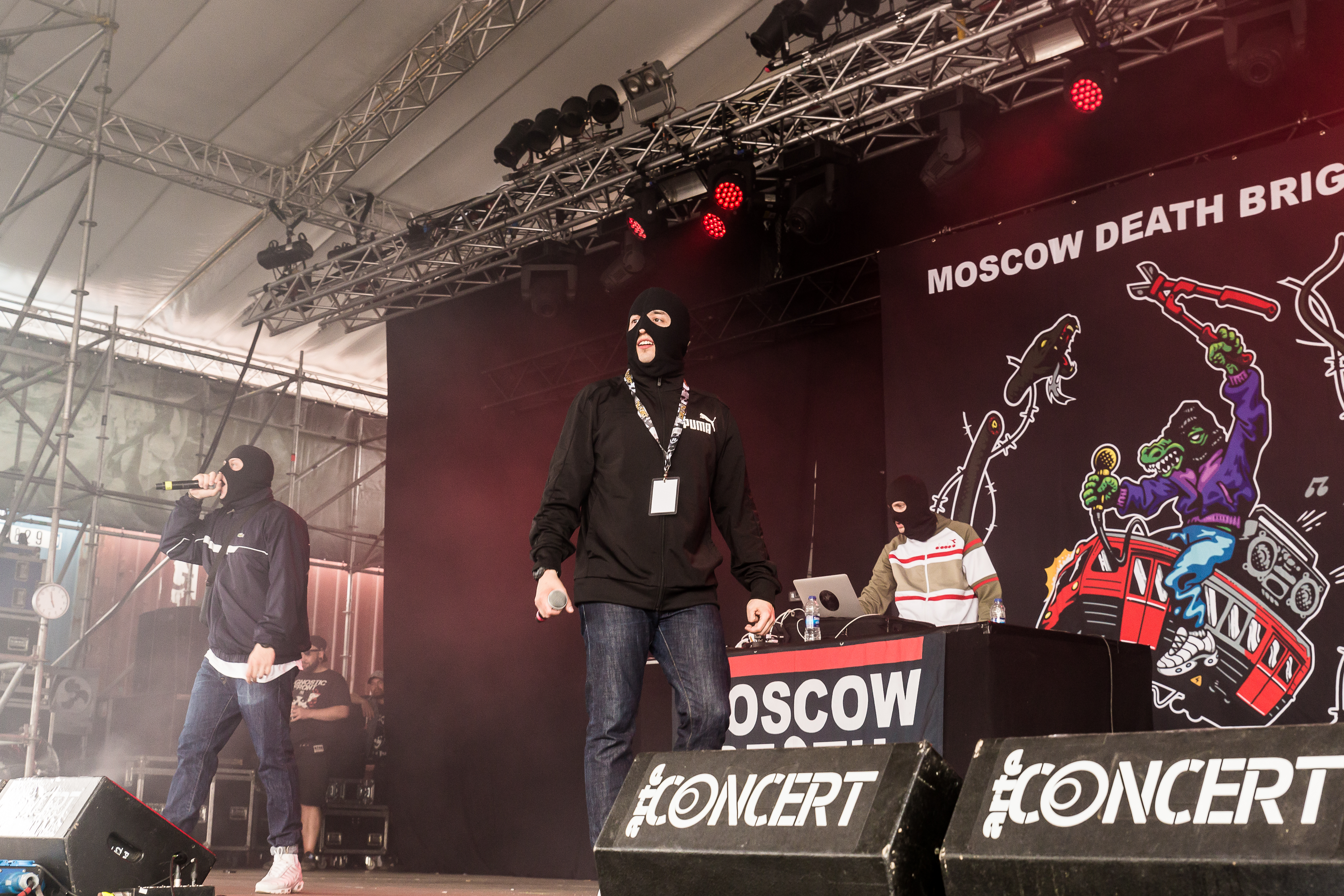
- Moscow Death Brigade at With Full Force 2018

Background information
- Origin: Moscow, Russia
- Genres: Hardcore hip-hop, hardcore punk
- Years active: 2007–present
- Label: Fire and Flames Music
- Members: Vlad Boltcutter; Ski Mask G DJ Solid Seb

Moscow Death Brigade (short MDB, Russian: Московская Бригада Смерти (МБС)) is a band from Moscow, Russia that plays a mix of hip-hop, punk rock and electronic music. The band's music and masked appearance emphasize its stance against racism, sexism and homophobia. The band does not consider itself a political band and claims that their views are just "human".

== History ==
The band was founded in 2007 and the members come from the hardcore punk scene. Common to all members is a fondness for the hip-hop of the 1980s / 1990s like the Beastie Boys, Cypress Hill, or the Transplants and an anti-fascist attitude. They changed to their current style to connect aggressive rap with guitar-heavy hardcore beats, followed a year later by releasing a second self-titled demo tape with three songs.

In 2014 the group released their first EP called Hoods Up, a reference to the former band name, on the German label Fire and Flames Music. The EP attracted the attention of Europe's punk scene and ensured that the band became known outside Russia's borders.

After extensive tours through Eastern and Central Europe, including among others with Feine Sahne Fischfilet, a split EP with the fellow Russian anti-fascist hardcore band What We Feel called Here to Stay was released, followed by another split release on Audiolith Records with the bands Feine Sahne Fischfilet, Los Fastidios and What We Feel. The latter was a benefit EP whose proceeds benefited the families of murdered Russian antifascists.

On February 15, 2015, an article on Indymedia in the run-up to a performance in Berlin claimed that the anti-fascist attitudes of the band were only lip service for marketing. The article instead stated that the band was sexist, homophobic, chauvinistic, and advocated for strong Russian nationalism. Four days later the band published a statement strongly rejecting the allegations. They expressed themselves, together with the band What We Feel that was also named in the article, that they are "anti-fascists against nationalists and racists of all stripes".

In May 2017, the band released the single Brother & Sisterhood and announced both a new album and the continuation of their European tour in the fall.

In February 2018, Moscow Death Brigade released their first full-length album Boltcutter on Fire and Flames Music. Expanding their musical style further the band produced an entirely electronic record combining styles like Drum’n’Bass, EDM, Hardstyle, Dub and more. The two MC's and DJ continued rapping on every track with lyrics about unity, touring, graffiti, street activism and struggle against discrimination. Following the release of Boltcutter the band embarked on a two-part Euro tour playing more than 40 headlining shows across the continent and in the UK, as well as appearing at various DIY and commercial festivals like Boomtown (UK) and With Full Force (Germany). The band also opened several shows for Feine Sahne Fischfillet in this year.

In 2019 Moscow Death Brigade was signed to German booking agency Destiny Tourbooking and went to play another Euro tour, returning to Boomtown, playing at Xtreme Fest (France) and opening for Madball in Spain.

On April 10, 2020, the album Bad Accent Anthems was released. With it the band continued experimenting with electronic sounds, but also returned to more punk rock and heavy metal inspired beats, as well as implemented electric guitars in some of the rave songs.

The album release tour for Bad Accent Anthems was to be the biggest tour for MDB yet, with more than 70 shows and festivals planned for Europe, UK and the band's first tour in the US. The band was supposed to perform at famous music festivals such as Punkrock Bowling (Las Vegas), Roskilde (Denmark) and Exit fest (Serbia). However, due to the COVID-19 pandemic the entire tour and all the festivals were cancelled with most of the shows moving to 2021.

== Imagery ==
The group appears masked with balaclavas. The identities of the two rappers and the DJ are still kept secret. The band members explain the choice of balaclavas the following way: “Our masks represent our roots and background, where we are coming from and what inspired our band's views and philosophy. These things include graffiti underground scene and DIY progressive social movements. Usually in those circles people would avoid having their faces posted all over the internet for many reasons. We also have always loved the idea of masked artists – from Kiss to MF Doom. Wearing a mask allows us to become one with our music and adds an element of mystery to the legend of the band.”

The band itself refers to their music as "Circle Pit hip-hop" or "hardcore hip-hop". In their music videos, the group often shows themselves spraying graffiti on trains or houses. The Russian and English lyrics deal with anti-fascism and are socio-critical. Topics include "police brutality, violence, mass media propaganda, social prejudice and conscription". The band sees itself as a collective to artist friends, including sprayer, concert organizers and political activists.

== Charity Work ==
Moscow Death Brigade is known for their non-profit activity. In 2015 the band took part in a benefit compilation with the bands Feine Sahne Fischfilet, Los Fastidios and What We Feel, whose proceeds benefited the families of murdered Russian antifascists.

Throughout 2018-2020 the band worked with Sisters foundation, a Russian independent non-profit organization that helps victims of domestic and sexual violence. The band raised more than €4,000 through their campaign No Means No, selling T-shirts depicting a crocodile biting off a hand (presumably of an abuser).

In 2019 Moscow Death Brigade teamed up with True Rebel Store (Germany/Switzerland) for a campaign called “All for One”, raising funds for the German non-profit organization “Women in Exile” that helps refugee women suffering from abuse and discrimination.

After releasing Bad Accent Anthems the band doubled down on charity work, taking part in numerous non-profit campaigns throughout 2020. In May 2020 the band released a new track Put Your Mask On - recorded and produced in COVID-19 quarantine - with all profits going to a Russian organization helping elderly in need. The band teamed up with True Rebel once again to sell protective face masks and according to True Rebel website and the band's social media accounts all profits were going to a Russian non-profit organization Enjoyable Ageing Foundation that helps disabled and elderly people; and for each mask sold one was given out to homeless in Germany.

MDB also appeared on Destiny Tourbooking's limited edition T-shirt “I was not there tour 2020” alongside bands like NOFX, Pennywise and Bad Religion. According to Destiny Tourbooking 50% of the profits from sales went to Doctors Without Borders.

On May 31, 2020, MDB took part in a digital festival “Stay Home and Stay Antiracist” hosted by Kulturinitiative Mittel-Holstein with the festival's main goal of raising funds for various anti-racist initiatives in Europe.

In April 2022 they started a campaign selling t-shirts to support "Taxi for solidarity" a "voluntary organization helping refugees fleeing from Ukraine to Europe: providing buses to take refugees from the border in Europe, providing them with food, necessities", donating €2,000.

== Discography ==
Albums

- 2018: Boltcutter (Fire and Flames Music)
- 2020: Bad Accent Anthems (Fire and Flames Music)
- 2024: Radio Hope

EPs:

- 2007: Hoods Up 495 (Self-distribution)
- 2008: Moscow Death Brigade (Self-distribution)
- 2014: Hoods Up (Fire and Flames Music/Tape Or Die)
- 2015: Here To Stay (Fire and Flames Music/Core Tex Records/The Voice of the Street Records; with What We Feel)
- 2015: Ghettoblaster/ It's Us Remix EP 2015 (Self-distribution)

Singles and videos:

- 2010: Герои
- 2010: Твои карты биты
- 2010: Армейская
- 2011: Till The End (with What We Feel)
- 2015: One For The Ski Mask
- 2015: Ghettoblaster
- 2015: It's Us
- 2015: Here To Stay (with What We Feel)
- 2015: Papers, Please!
- 2017: Brother & Sisterhood
- 2018: Boltcutter
- 2018: What We Do
- 2019: Throw Ya Canz
- 2020: Out The Basement

Compilation contributions:

- 2011: Heroes on DrushbAntifa Fight Local Resist Global (True Rebel Records)
- 2015: One For The Ski Mask on United Worldwide (Audiolith/KOB Records/The Voice Of The Street Records)
- 2015: Here To Stay on Plastic X Bomb #91 (Plastic Bomb Records)
- 2015: Viking's Life on Le Son De La Goupille: Refugees Welcome (Rap and Revenge)
- 2015: Anne Frank's Army on A Story Of Teeth And Flowers (In-house production)
