= Smoke'n'Soul =

- Smoke'n'Soul performing at Exit Festival in July 2008

Background information
- Origin: Belgrade, Serbia
- Genres: Reggae, Dub, Funk, Soul, Dancehall
- Years active: 2000 - present
- Label: Automatik Records
- Members: Miloš Iković; Vladimir Krkljuš; Vukašin Marković; Nebojša Potkonjak; Andreja Bućan; Vlada Jovanović; Ivan Jovanović; Damjan Ćirilović; Vladimir Tomić; Rade Martinović
- Website: http://myspace.com/smokensoul

Smoke'n'Soul is a roots reggae/dancehall band from Belgrade, Serbia. It was formed in 2000 by Miloš Iković and Vladimir Krkljuš. Over the years they have developed their organic sound that incorporates all of the roots reggae foundations and rasta philosophies, as well as introducing heavy funk and soul influence. Smoke'n'Soul won Rebel Demo - Battle of the Bands contest held in 2003 in Belgrade playing their first single War Inside of You. The band has played well received shows appearing in many of the Balkans established music festivals including three performances at the Exit Festival in Novi Sad, Serbia. They have released an eponymous debut album on Automatik Records in 2007. Currently the band is working on a second album and continues playing concerts in Serbia and in former Yugoslav countries.

== Early years ==
In 2003, Smoke'n'Soul was declared the best demo band in Serbia, and a song War Inside Of You was published on a compilation CD called Rebel Demo. The band played many shows, including opening for Julian Marley and appearing in festival in Croatia Istra in Reggae and in Slovenia Soča Riversplash Festival.

== Debut album ==
During 2005 and 2006, Smoke'n'Soul recorded their first album. Miloš Iković and Vladimir Krkljuš took on recording and mixing duties and co-produced the album with Goran Živković and Vladan Matić doing postproduction. Album was released in 2007 and spawned a #1 radio hit single in Serbia - Find the Way. Videos were filmed for both Find the Way and One Day - a second single and a concert favorite.

== Festivals ==
The band had many successful appearances in well established festivals. In the early days Smoke'n'Soul appeared in Trenchtown Festival in Palić (Subotica) in 2002, in Rebel Demo in Belgrade in 2003. The band also performed three times at Exit Festival - in 2002, 2003 and 2005 at the Reggae Stage and in 2008 at the Fusion Stage (opening for Gentleman). In 2008 Smoke'n'Soul appeared at Reggae Serbia Festival in Pančevo. Another well received performance by the band took place in Kotor at the Refresh Festival in 2008.

== Current activities ==
Smoke'n'Soul has strong connections to Serbian reggae scene with some members playing in other bands as well - Irie FM, Burning Sounds, Eyesburn. While occasionally playing in the greater Belgrade region, the band is currently working on a follow-up album, tentatively entitled Soul Infected.

== Collaborations ==
Notable guest appearances include Asher Selector and Prince Alla.

== Discography ==
=== Studio albums ===
- Smoke'n'Soul (2007) - Automatik Records/Warner Music

=== Compilations ===
- Rebel Demo - War Inside of You (2003) - Dom omladine Beograd

== Videos ==
- Find the Way (by Tamara Popov and Looney)
- One Day (by Nemanja Ličina)

== Band members ==
- Miloš Iković - lead vocal, rhythm guitar, tenor flute
- Vladimir Krkljuš – lead vocals, backing vocals, drums
- Vukašin Marković – lead vocals, trombone
- Nebojša Potkonjak – backing vocals, trumpet
- Andreja Bućan – tenor saxophone
- Vlada Jovanović - trumpet
- Ivan Jovanović - trombone
- Damjan Ćirilović – bass guitar
- Vladimir Tomić – backing vocals, lead guitar
- Rade Martinović – keyboards
