= E-Play =

Serbian alternative rock band

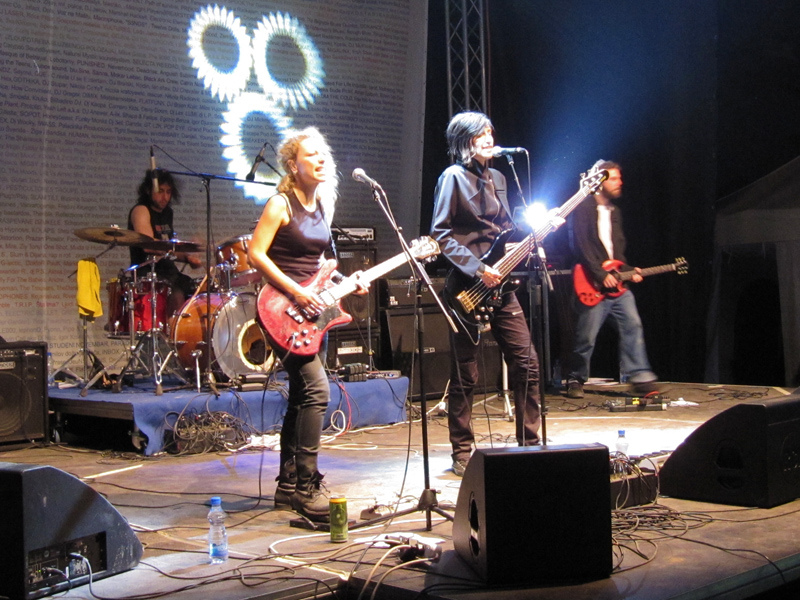
- E-Play performing live at the 2010 Exit festival in Novi Sad

Background information
- Origin: Belgrade, Serbia
- Genres: Alternative rock, electronic rock, dance-rock, house, downtempo, trip hop, drum and bass, shoegazing
- Years active: 1997 – present
- Labels: J.O.S. Virus, MCM, PGP-RTS, Cinema City, Exit Music
- Members: Maja Cvetković; Nemanja Velimirović; Goran Ljuboja
- Past members: Nemanja Aćimović; Sonja Lončar; Damjan Dašić; Marko Milivojević; Biljana Todorovski; Danilo Nikodinovski; Kristina Jovanović
- Website: www.eplaymusic.com

E-Play are a Serbian alternative rock band from Belgrade.

== History ==
The band was formed in 1997, initially having several lineup changes before the lineup consisting of Biljana Todorovski (guitar, vocals), Maja Cvetković (bass guitar, vocals) and Jarboli member Nemanja Aćimović (drums) became the default one. The band also had a semi-official band member Sonja Lončar who played an analogue synthesizer until permanently leaving the band in 2002. With a unique musical style influenced by a diverse range of genres, and having a majority of female band members, E-Play quickly got the public's attention, establishing themselves on the Serbian alternative rock scene.

As the winners of the 2000 Urban Demo festival, the band got the opportunity to release their eponymous debut album, produced by Goran Živković. Beside the material, featuring the song lyrics written in both Serbian and English language, the band recorded a cover version of the Monteniggers track "Pop". The album was promoted by several music videos, for the song "Zašto?" ("Why"), directed by Milorad Milinković, "Pop", "Prvi pogled tvoj" ("Your First Glance") and "Better Than You".

The following year, the band performed at the Novi Sad Exit festival, and performed as an opening act for Asian Dub Foundation. The band also appeared on the movie soundtrack for the Raša Andrić's movie Munje! (Thunderbirds!) with the song "Prvi pogled tvoj" ("Your First Look"), later performing on the movie promotion held in Sava Centar and Belgrade's Republic Square. Director Milan Kilibarda directed a documentary about the band entitled Video dnevnik (Video Journal).

In 2002, as a part of the ad hoc supergroup Crni Zub i Nova Moćna Organizacija, consisting of Disciplin A Kitschme, Eyesburn and E-Play members, Sonja Lončar, Biljana Todorovski and Maja Cvetković recorded a cover version of Ekatarina Velika song "Zemlja" ("Land"), for the Milan Mladenović tribute album Kao da je bilo nekad... ... (Posvećeno Milanu Mladenoviću) (As If It Had Happened Sometime... (Dedicated to Milan Mladenović)). During the same year, the song "In The Middle" appeared in Miroslav Lekić's movie Labyrinth. The following year, on January, the band performed as a musical background for the Boris Nikolić fashion shows held in Zagreb and Bologna.

The second studio album, Crime, released in 2005, the band recorded in the lineup which, beside Biljana Todorovski and Maja Cvetković, featured Marko Milivojević (groovebox) and Damjan Dašić (drums). The album, produced by Block Out member Nikola Vranjković, featured a remix of the song "One Again", done by Saša Lovkov and Uroš Milovanović, and as guests on the album appeared Bajaga i Instruktori member Saša Lokner (keyboards), Eyesburn frontman Nemanja Kojić "Coyote" (trombone, vocals), Block Out member Dragoljub Marković (keyboards) and Overdrive member Damir Milutinov (vocals). During the same year, the band performed as an opening act on the Faithless performance in Belgrade.

In 2009, the band released their third studio album, Drago mi je da smo se upoznali (Nice to Meet You). The album, once again produced by Nikola Vranjković, featured guest appearances by Aleksandar Petrović "Alek", drums on "Loš dan" ("Bad Day") and "Bez reči" ("Wordless"), Sunshine vocalist Bane Bojović, vocals and lyrics on "Vremeplov" ("Time Machine") and Block Out member Dejan Hasečić on all three previously mentioned tracks. As a bonus track on the album appeared a Marko Nastić remix of the song "Too Late". Beside the album being available on CD, released by the Cinema City record label, an mp3 version of the album, available for free digital download was released by the Exit Music label.

In December 2013, the band released their fourth studio album entitled Obični ljudi (Ordinary People). The album was announced by the singles "Ljubica", released in June 2012, "Hiljadu ljudi" ("Thousand People"), released in October 2012, "Divan dan" ("Wonderful Day"), released in November 2012 and "Iluzija" ("Illusion"), featuring guest appearance by Matija Dedić on piano, released in March 2013, Obični ljudi featured Maja Cvetković as the only remaining member of E-Play original lineup, and two new members, drummer Goran Ljuboja "Trut" (formerly of Rambo Amadeus' backing band) and guitarist Danilo Nikodinovski. On 26 June 2016 the band performed together with Matija Dedić in a park in Belgrade, performing E-Play songs in new arrangements.

In December 2016, the band released the single "Da budemo samo dobro" ("May We Be Well"), announcing their new studio album. In December 2017, they released the second single from the upcoming album, "Srešćemo se neki drugi put" ("We'll Meet Another Time").

== Discography ==
=== Studio albums ===
- E-Play (2000)
- Crime (2005)
- Drago mi je da smo se upoznali (2009)
- Obični ljudi (2013)
- Sloboda (2018)
- Diši duboko (2025)

=== Other appearances ===
- "Prvi pogled tvoj" (Muzika iz filma "Munje"; 2001)
