= Lollobrigida Girls =

Lollobrigida
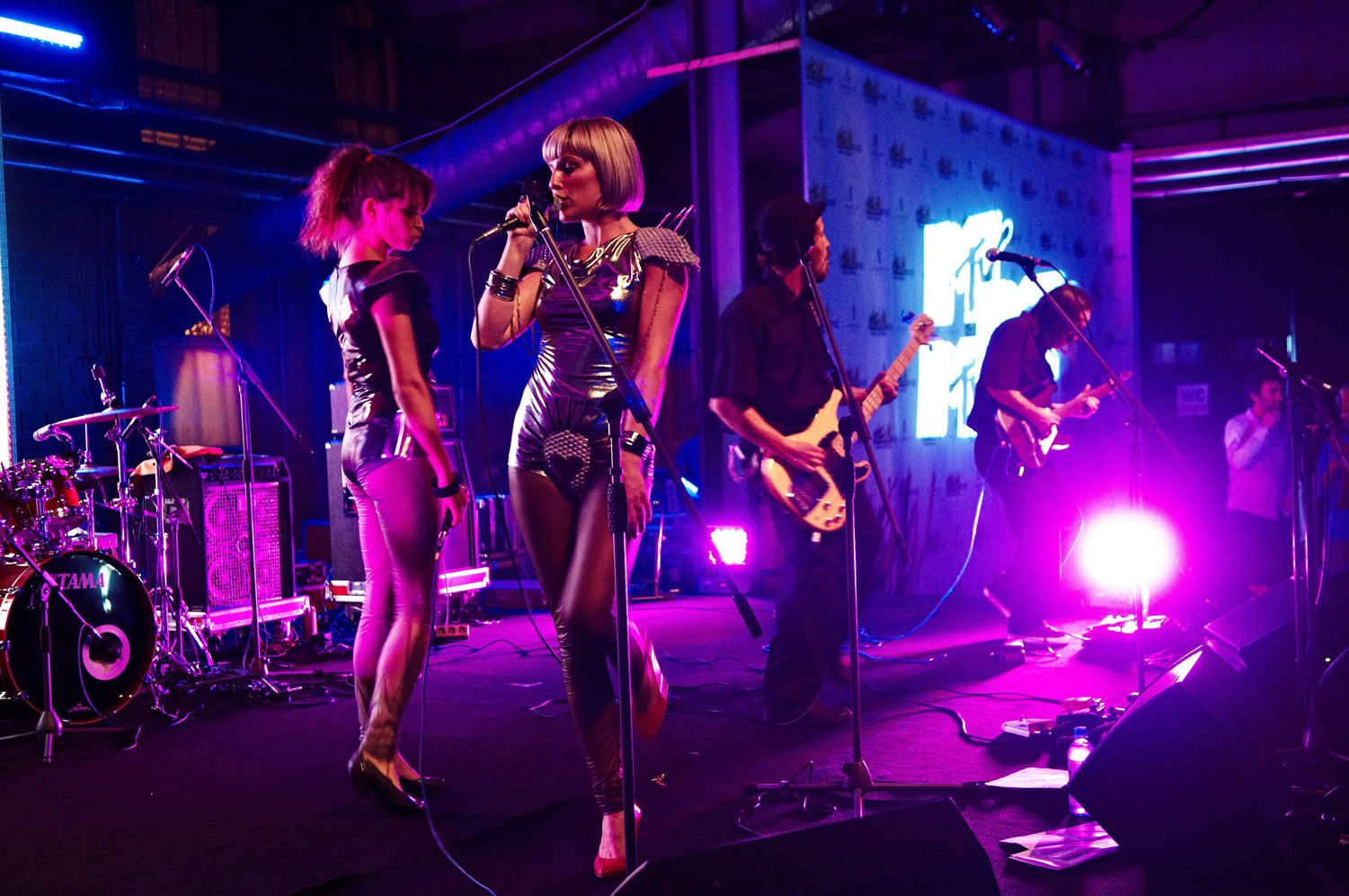
- Lollobrigida performing at Weekend Media Festival 2009 in Rovinj, Croatia

Background information
- Also known as: Lollobrigida Girls; VIS Lollobrigida
- Origin: Zagreb, Croatia
- Genres: Electropop; synthpop; dance-punk; electropunk; electroclash
- Years active: 2003–present
- Labels: Menart Records; DOP Records
- Members: Ida Prester; Petra Cigoj
- Past members: David Halb; Matej "Kleemar" Končan; Ivan Levačić; Jernej Šavel; Marko Turkalj; Natalija Dimičevski; Anise; Zoran Pleško; Lovorka Huljić; Ivana Vodanović; Sanja Šiljković; Krunoslav Tomašinec Šinec

The Lollobrigida Girls, also known as VIS Lollobrigida or simply Lollobrigida is originally a Croatian, Zagreb–based, female electro-pop/synthpop band. In 2008. The Slovenes Kleemar, David, and Jernej joined the band rendering the group Croatian-Slovenian in its composition.

== Lollobrigida band members ==
- Ida Prester – vocals
- Petra Cigoj – vocals
- Kleemar (Matej Končan) – keyboards
- Jernej Šavel – bass guitar (left the band in 2013)
- Ivan Levačić Levi – drums

== Early history ==
As a duo, Lollobrigida performed for the first time at a bigger public concert in June 2003 in the student club KSET, as an opening band for German trash-style musician Mambo Kurt, attracting immediately a pronounced interest within Zagreb's underground-music audience.

In the original lineup there were Ida Prester and Natalija Dimicevski singing and playing bass-guitar on top of their computer-generated music matrix. In February 2004 the duo performed as a sole band at the crowded concert in Zagreb's Studentski centar; after that they signed a contract with the Slovenian label Menart Records/DOP Records.

In June 2004 Lollobrigida performed at the third Zagreb Pride.

Lollobrigida's first single, "Party", was released in September 2004 soon becoming a pretty well-accepted hit, rendering the underground phenomenon into a name known to many, first in Croatia and latter on in the neighboring countries. Sizeable covering in Croatian media, involving print, radio, and television, release of an anti-holiday single "Unhappy Christmas", and a performance at the big rock-concert Fiju Briju in Zagreb all enabled Lollobrigida to keep a high level of interest in the audience till the release of their debut album Cartoon Explosion, in May 2005. The girls have promoted the album in the club KSET again. The introductory band at the latter concert was a hip-hop duo Bitcharke na travi from Serbia, Beograd.

== VIS Lollobrigida ==
In 2006 Lollobrigida transformed to some extent their musical and stage-performing concept. Natalija left the band. Several instrumentalists, playing keyboards, guitar and bass, joined the band adding a new sound quality to the electronic matrix background. Unlike Ida, the band founder and the Lollobrigida constant, other band members were changing rather frequently. The prefix VIS has been also added to the band name. (A sort of sentimental homage to pop-rock music of socialistic times). During that year Lollobrigida started working on their new album, 'Lollobrigida Incorporated', finally released in May 2008, following the promo-concert taken place in Zagreb club Tvornica. In 2005 the single 'Bubblegum boy' was released. Soon after, the accompanied video spot was broadcast by MTV Adria and many other local TV-networks. In 2006 the band increased its popularity by releasing the single and video spot 'Moj decko je gay' (meaning 'My boyfriend is gay'). In 2008, a few months before a release of the new album, the single (and a video-spot) 'Miss Right and Mrs. Wrong' was launched, reaching the top positions on many Croatian musical top-lists. In June 2009. the single and the video spot 'Volim te' was released reaching the top position on the 'Pure MTV Adria Chart list'. The English version of the spot 'Volim te' was promoted on MTV Adria in November 2009. In 2010. Lollobrigida released the single and videospot 'Bivša djevojka' ('Ex-girlfriend') and in 2011. the singles and videospots 'Kompjuter' and 'Sex on TV, sex on the radio'. In numerous interviews in Croatian media Ida Prester announced in 2011 work on the third band's album. Immediately before its promotion the single 'Malo vremena' was released. The third album by Lollobrigida, 'Pilula', was premièred on 21. January 2012 at the concert held in the club Tvornica, Zagreb. On 18.6.2012. single and the video 'Ja se resetiram' ('I'm resetting') was released, immediately attracting some international attention.

== Musical style and performances ==
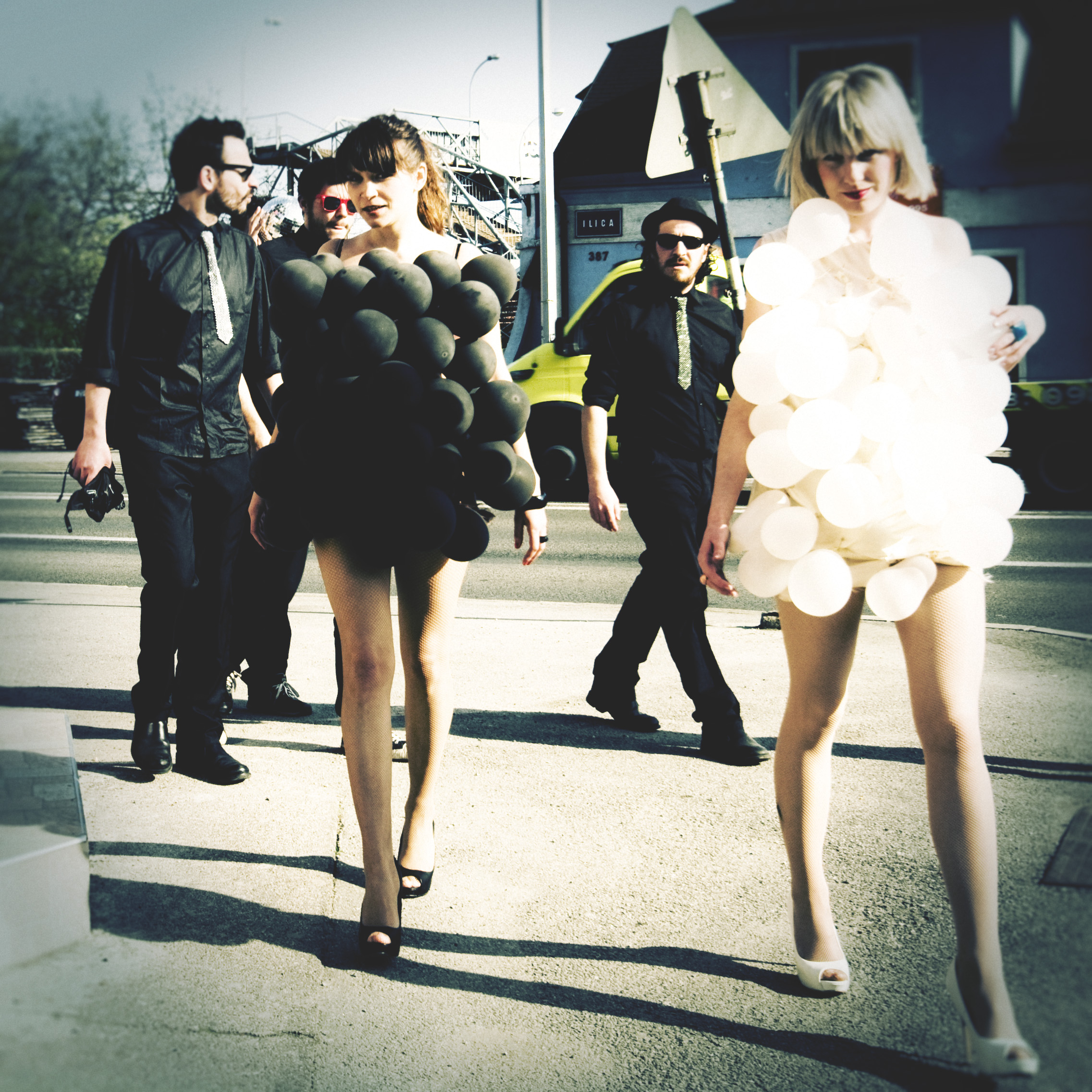
Band Lollobrigida at the streets of Zagreb in one of their concert outfits.

Lyrics, music and stage performance appear to be equally important elements of the way that Lollobrigida band communicates with its audience. By insisting on honesty, simplicity and originality Lollobrigida keeps distance from standard musical and textual stereotypes, choosing instead a sort of genre indeterminacy. At variance with the latter elements, the perfection of their musical and vocal interpretations is not particularly cultivated. Ida Prester authors the lyrics of all the songs being simultaneously, taking into account the whole opus up to now, a leading author of all music as well. Critics have expressed variety of opinions about Lollobrigida; some are denying any value and/or musical importance while there are also those remarking '...Lollobrigida is the biggest thing that Croatia gave to the international music scene in the past years...'. Time Out (magazine), in its edition focusing life in Croatia, inserted band Lollobrigida on the list of 115 most prominent acts/individuals/places of contemporary Croatian culture.

Since their start-up Lollobrigida was performing at numerous concerts in Croatia, Serbia, Slovenia, Bosnia-Herzegovina, Hungary and North Macedonia. On 1 September 2009 MTV Adria nominated Lollobrigida for the Best Regional Act Award, together with four bands from Slovenia, Bosnia-Herzegovina and Serbia. On basis of Internet voting Lollobrigida won the award, as announced on 12 October 2009. The award was handed over to the band in the course of MTV Europe Music Awards 2009 show, which took place on 5 November 2009 in Berlin, Germany in O2 World hall. Among their live performances one can especially single out a sequence of six well-accepted performances, from 2005 on, at EXIT (festival), Novi Sad, Serbia. There, Lollobrigida became a sort of a trademark of the festival's 'Elektrana' Stage. In 2009. Lollobrigida performed for the first time at the 'Fusion' Stage of EXIT (festival) and in 2010., on 10 July, at the festival's 'Main Stage'. In 2012. and 2013., Lollobrigida kept with their shows at EXIT (festival),performing again on the Fusion Stage (2012.) and on a new EXIT (festival)' s stage, ' Riffs&Beats' (2013.).

== Discography ==
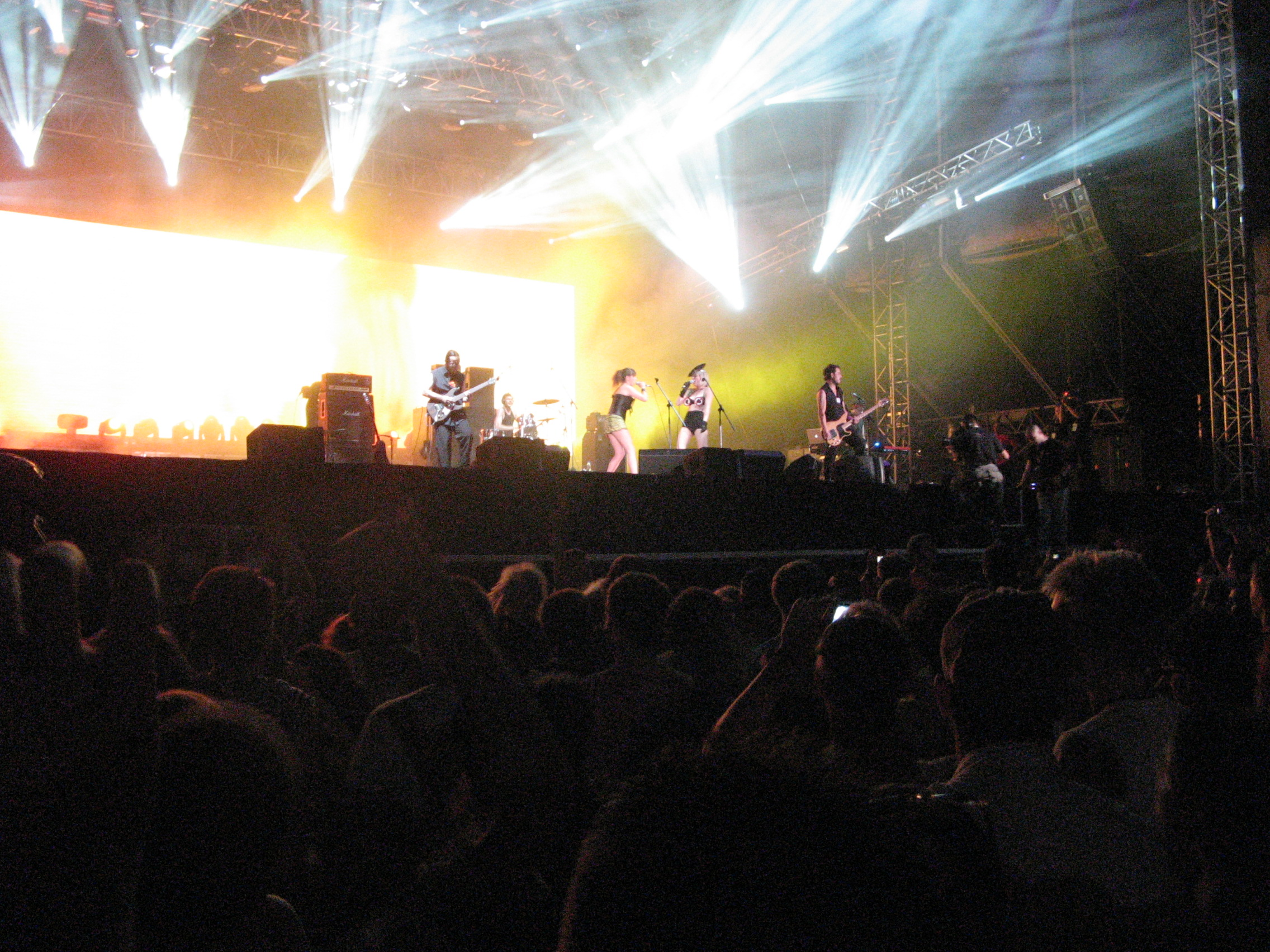
Band Lollobrigida performs at the Main Stage- of EXIT (festival), 10. July 2010.

=== Albums ===
- Cartoon Explosion (2005)
- Lollobrigida Inc. (2008)
- Pilula (2012)

=== Singles ===
- "Party" (2004)
- "Nesretan Božić" (2004)
- "Straight Edge" (2005)
- "Bubblegum Boy" (2005)
- "Ružna Djevojka" (2005)
- "Moj decko je gej" (2006)
- "Mrs. Right and Mr. Wrong" (2008)
- "Volim te" (2009)
- "Bivša cura" (2010)
- "Kompjuter" (2011)
- "Sex on TV, Sex on the Radio" (2011)
- "Malo vremena" (2012)
- "Ja se resetiram" (2012)
- "Pilula" (2012)
- "Stroboskop" (2013)
- "Reklama" (2013)
