= Ritam Nereda =

RitamNerada a rock band from Novi Sad

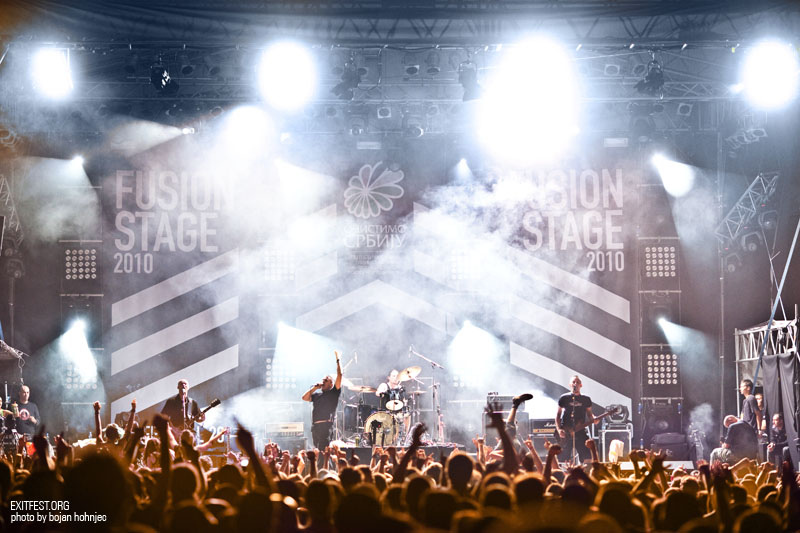
- Ritam Nereda performing live at the 2010 EXIT festival

Background information
- Origin: Novi Sad, Serbia
- Genres: Punk rock, Oi!, hardcore punk, crossover thrash
- Years active: 1986–present
- Labels: Predskazanje, Dim, Ghost House, Walzwerk, Music YUser, Hi-Fi Centar, Automatik, Metropolis Records, One Records, SKCNS
- Members: Boban Petronić; Miroslav Mijatović; Aleksandar Savić – Savara; Saša Friš
- Past members: Četa; Slobodan Fekete; Miodrag Balaban; Milan Krajnović; P.J.
- Website: www.ritamnereda.com

Ritam Nereda (Serbian Cyrillic: Ритам Нереда; trans. Rhythm of Mess) is a Serbian and Yugoslav oi!/punk rock band from Novi Sad.

== History ==
=== 1980s ===
The band was formed in 1986, by Boban Petronić (bass guitar, vocals), who previously worked with Vrisak Generacije, Fritz (guitar), and Pavke (drums), and having intensively rehearsed, they recorded their first demo recording, the song "Za Novi Sad" ("For Novi Sad"), the following year, at Pavke's Studio M. Due to the audience positive reactions to the recordings, the band, in an altered lineup, which featured Petronić (vocals), Četa (bass guitar), and P.J. (drums), and Slobodan Fekete "Barbun" (guitar), started performing, mainly in clubs.

The selected recordings from the performances from this period were later released on the band's first official demo recording Oi Ain't Dead, released in early 1990 by the Belgrade record label Predskazanje Records. The demo, available only on compact cassette, beside live recordings, also featured studio material, recorded at the Barbaro and Matrix studios.

=== 1990s ===
The recordings from the debut studio album, Nikog nema (There Is No One), released in 1991, was sent to many European record labels, eventually being released in 1991 by German label Dim Records in LP and CD formats. The album, with live versions of "Skinheads" and "Sama" ("Alone"), was released in Serbia by Ghost House Records. Due to the worldwide catalog sales of the album, the band appeared on several various artists compilations, and was charted on several independent European top lists. The album was promoted live in major Serbian cities, including Novi Sad, Belgrade and Kragujevac.

After the album release, the band got another guitar player, Milan Krajnović "Ćomi", a former Mr Joint and Loš Spoj member. The new lineup recorded the second studio album, Breaking, released by the German record label Walzwerk Records, and the funds from the album sales were used for humanitarian purposes, helping children endangered by the Yugoslav Wars. Before the album release, the German authorities took over the album recordings, claiming that the label was breaking the economic sanctions imposed to Yugoslavia by the United Nations, but, after a compromise, made with the help of UNICEF, the album release was allowed. Beside the songs with lyrics in Serbian language, including the hit "Put beznađa" ("Road of Hopelessness"), the album featured five songs with English language lyrics. The album was also released in Serbia, entitled Razbijanje (Breaking), and was released by Music YUser, available on compact cassette only, and featuring lyrics entirely in Serbian language.

After the album release, P.J. left the band, being replaced by former Annathema drummer Miodrag Balaban "Stavra", and the new lineup recorded the live album Pogo Live, featuring material recorded live at the Belgrade KST, Studio M, and the Novi Sad Spens Sports Center, during the late 1994. At the time, the band often got invitations to perform at various European festivals, however, due to the visa issues, the band did not perform abroad. However, the lineup did not last long as, in 1996, both Balaban and Četa left the band, being replaced by bassist Kića and P.J, who returned to the band. The lineup recorded the album Zvuci bola (Sounds of Pain), with lyrics dealing with the current political situation in the country. The band recorded promotional videos for the songs "Tuđi glasovi" ("Other Voices") and "Vaš svet" ("Your World").

On early November 1997, at the time of conflicts of Romani people and skinheads in Belgrade, the band's performance at the Belgrade Studentski kulturni centar was nearly canceled, because band was accused, by the state media, for spreading hatred and racism. The following year, A Records and Nered Source (band's private label) re-released Pogo Live, Nikog nema and Breaking on CD. "Nikog nema" and "Breaking" were reissued on single 22 songs CD as the first digipack CD issue in Serbia. Cover of this issue was awarded the title of the best rock cover design in 1998. (Design and digital prepress by Darko SadžakSačko). Also, the live versions of the band songs "Nikad više" ("Nevermore"), and "Sama" appeared on the live various artists compilation Četiri godine na Golom otoku (Four Years at Goli otok) and Svi protiv svih (Everybody Against Everybody), recorded live at KST on December 9, 1995, at the TV Politika Paket Aranžman fifth anniversary, and released in 1998 by Hi-Fi Centar.

The fourth studio album, 999, recorded in Austria at the Art Noise Studio in Wels, beside Krajnović, P.J and Milunović, who produced the album, featured bassist Miroslav Mijatović "Mire", a former Pero Defformero member. Due to the 1999 NATO bombing of Yugoslavia, the band had to return to the country and wait for eight months for the album mastering and record releasing. The album, with songs with lyrics in both Serbian and English language, featured the distinguished tracks "Protest", "Kraj" ("The End"), "Jedan dan" ("One Day"), "10 godina" ("10 Years"), and "Deep Sleep". Bonus tracks from the album, "Betrayed" and "Jedan dan" ("One Day"), were recorded at the Kragujevac Češnjak studio.

=== 2000s ===
In 2002, the band released their first live album Exist To Resist, recorded on the Spring of 2002 at the Belgrade Studentski kulturni centar. During the same year, the studio album Poriv (Impulse), produced by Milunović, recorded in Austria and post-produced in Sweden, was also released. The album brought a slight stylistic change in the band sound, bringing negative reactions from both the fans and critics, resulting the band not performing the songs from the album on their live appearances.

In October 2006, the band released the album IX, featuring the bonus track "Visoki napon" ("High Voltage"), for which the song lyrics were written by Partibrejkers frontman Zoran Kostić "Cane". The album, for which the cover was designed by former Džukele member Leonid "Leo fon Punkerstein" Pilipović, was produced by Ljubomir Pejić. The band recorded a promotional video for the song "Hiljade" ("Thousands") which contains the same background and chorus melody as in the Sisters Of Mercy's 1987 song "This Corrosion", and presented the album in Novi Sad, Belgrade, and the Inđija Green Fest, where Zoran Kostić "Cane" appeared as guest. During the same year, the band participated the Pankrti tribute album Pankrti 06, with the cover version of the song "Anarhist".

In 2007, and in 2008, the band performed at the EXIT festival, and during 2008, the band appeared as guests on the hip hop band Monogamija album Lovac na kurve (Whore Hunter), on the bonus track "Asfaltirana džungla" ("Asphalt Jungle"). The following year, on November, guitarist Milan Krajnović "Ćomi" left the band being replaced by Pero Defformero guitarist Saša Friš, at the time when the band was finishing the recordings sessions for their next studio album with the work title Paklena mašina (Hell Machine), recorded at the Belgrade studio Barba and Ljubljana studio Fabrika 13.

=== 2010s ===
In June 2010, the band released its seventh studio and tenth official release, Paralelni svet (Parallel World). The album was released in two versions, the CD digipack format, released through SKC Novi Sad record label and featuring the bonus track "Daj mi" ("Give Me"), and a free download version at the Exit festival official website. The promotional tour included a performance on Metalcamp festival in Slovenia. In an interview, Petronijevć stated that a DVD featuring recordings from the tour would be released. On September 15, 2012, Ritam Nereda performed on Warrior's Dance festival, organized by British group The Prodigy and Exit festival, on Belgrade's Kalemegdan.

In April 2015, Ritam Nereda released the single "Zauvek" ("Forever"), announcing their tenth studio album entitled To nisi ti (It's Not You).

In 2017, the band released the 30th anniversary album 30 godina (30 Years), featuring re-recordings of 26 live favourites with the current lineup and a more modern sound.

== Legacy ==
In 2000, the song "Put beznađa" was polled No.24 on Rock Express Top 100 Yugoslav Rock Songs of All Times list.

The lyrics of 3 songs by the band were featured in Petar Janjatović's book Pesme bratstva, detinjstva & potomstva: Antologija ex YU rok poezije 1967 - 2007 (Songs of Brotherhood, Childhood & Offspring: Anthology of Ex YU Rock Poetry 1967 – 2007).

== Discography ==
=== Official demo recordings ===
- Za Novi Sad (1987)
- Oi Ain't Dead (1989)

=== Studio albums ===
- Nikog nema (1991)
- Breaking (1993)
- Zvuci bola (1996)
- 999 (2000)
- Poriv (2002)
- IX (2006)
- Paralelni svet (2010)
- To nisi ti (2015)
- Novo doba (2023)

=== Live albums ===
- Pogo Live (1995)
- Exist To Resist (2002)

=== Singles ===
- N.S. Kids Are Innocent (1990)
- Put beznađa (1996)
- Nikad više / "Sama" (1998)
- Suton (2006)
- Anarhist (2006)
- Asfaltirana džungla (with Monogamija, 2008)
- Zauvek (2015)

== See also ==
- Punk rock in Yugoslavia
