= Mud Factory =

Serbian metal band

- Origin: Vranje, Serbia
- Genres: Groove metal; deathcore
- Years active: 2012–present
- Labels: Nocturne Media
- Members: Stefan Milanović; Milan Stefanović; Nemanja Stanković; Vanja Seneši
- Past members: Nemanja Milanović

Mud Factory is a Serbian metal band from Vranje formed in 2012.

== History ==
Mud Factory was formed in 2012 by vocalist Stefan Milanović, bass player Nemanja Stanković, guitar player Milan Stefanović and drummer Nemanja Milanović. The band played at several festivals around the Balkans throughout 2013. In the Požarevac Gitarijada (guitar festival), they were chosen as the second best band. They later won the Zaječar Gitarijada. They also participated in two local festivals: Balkan Street and Reload Festival. On 23 August 2013, Mud Factory released their first extended play titled Born for Doom. Later in September, they released a music video for their song "Reason Not to Kill", recorded in an abandoned glass factory. Drummer Nemanja Milanović departed the band in 2014 and was replaced with Vanja Seneši, who was a friend of the band. That year, the band won the qualification festival for Wacken Open Air in Kragujevac and performed in the superfinal at the Underwall Festival in Zadar . Mud Factory's second EP, Project Extinction, was released on 21 April 2015 under the Nocturne Media label. "Where They Sleep", a song from the EP, was later released as a single and a music video.

=== Factory Fest ===
Mud Factory created a music festival named Factory Fest, which held its first celebration on 30 January 2016 in Pančevo and held a second celebration on 18 February in Vranje. Bass player Nemanja Stanković explained the concept of the festival in an interview:

We came up with the idea to organize a festival where we would give the opportunity to the bands with whom we have had cooperation so far and which we did not have the opportunity to welcome, to play in Vranje. There are not many things happening here, especially related to the metal scene, so we thought the festival would be a good opportunity to change this since of course there is an audience. We have a little expanded the idea that the festival will be held wherever there are conditions for this, so we also included Pančevo.

In August 2016, Mud Factory played at the 50th Zaječar Gitarijada. In June 2018, the band performed at the Exit Festival in Novi Sad. That same year, on 1 September, they performed at a music documentary festival at Niš.

They played Arsenal fest in 2019. as well as some minor shows in Serbia.

Mud Factory published their first LP album "The Sins of Our Fathers" on 11.12.2020. via Wormholedeath records. Album was mixed and mastered by Fredrik Nordström in Studio Fredman, Sweden, and supported by SOKOJ and Wacken foundation.

== Musical style ==
Mud Factory initially played stoner metal, but are currently aligned to groove metal and death metal genres. Guitarist Milan Stefanović, however, has stated that the band did not "like to generalize their genre", and simply deem themselves as a metal band. Serbian Metal Portal, a metal enthusiast website, has cited deathcore, stoner metal, and groove metal as sources for Mud Factory's music."

Mud Factory cites Machine Head, Lamb of God, DevilDriver, Whitechapel, Gojira, and Mastodon as influences.

== Members ==
Current members

- Stefan Milanović – vocals (2012–present)
- Milan Stefanović – guitars (2012–present)
- Nemanja Stanković – bass (2012–present)
- Vanja Seneši – drums (2014–present)

Former members

- Nemanja Milanović – drums (2012–2014)

Timeline

== Discography ==
Extended play (EP)

- Born For Doom (2013)
- Project Extinction (2015)

Singles

- Reason Not to Kill (2013)
- Where They Sleep (2016)
