= Concrete Sun =

Serbian heavy metal band

- Origin: Novi Sad, Serbia
- Genres: Sludge metal, grunge
- Years active: 2007–present
- Label: Miner Recordings
- Members: Strahinja Cerovina; Budimir Živković; Strahinja Stojković; Stevan Fujto; Aleksandar Savić
- Past members: Bojan Mijatović; Strahinja Petrović; Miloš Topić
- Website: facebook.com/concrete.sun

Concrete Sun is a Serbian heavy metal band from Novi Sad, Serbia. Formed in September 2007, the band went through a few lineup changes which halted its initial progress, including a yearlong hiatus in 2009. The band currently consists of Strahinja Cerovina (lead vocals), Budimir Živković (guitar), Strahinja Stojković (guitar), Stevan Fujto (bass guitar), Aleksandar Savić (drums).

Their debut album Sky Is High was self-released in August 2011 and scored good reviews on stoner rock outposts like Heavyplanet, Doommantia and The Ripple Effect. The album is available via Bandcamp for a 'name your price' digital purchase.

As of December 2012, the album has been officially released through Switzerland-based label Miner Recordings.

Their second album Eight was released in February 2014, again through Miner Recordings and it contains eight tracks.

In late 2011, Gruvanje, the only rock music show which airs on a national TV frequency in Serbia, awarded Concrete Sun with a 'Biggest Hope For 2012' title, and as part of the award, they have been granted a 5-song recording in RTV's 'Studio M'. Concrete Sun has been featured on several compilations. Their single 'Silver Tear' has been included in The Ripple Effect's 'Head Music' and 'God Forsaken Prostitute' appeared on Heavy Planet's 'Bong Hits From The Astral Basement'.

Highlight of Concrete Sun's 'live' career is the appearance on Budapest's Sziget Festival in 2012, Exit Festival 2010/2012, and Koncert Godine Festival, a rock and roll festival in Serbia.

== Musical style and influences ==
Concrete Sun's musical style is a blend of southern rock, blues, stoner, groove, sludge and grunge, characterized by bluesy melodies, sharp vocals and heavy riffage. Concrete Suns likened their genre to "Southern stoner grunge" and added that "there's a lot more to the story than just that."

Bands that have influenced Concrete Sun include Down, Pantera, Black Label Society, Corrosion of Conformity, Eyehategod, Black Sabbath, Clutch, Acid Bath.

== Albums ==
Year	Album details
2011
2011	Sky Is High: Released: August, 2011; Label: Self-released; Format: Digital distribution
2012	Sky Is High: Released: December, 2012; Label: Miner Recordings; Format: CD, LP, Digital distribution
2014	Eight: Released: February, 2014; Label: Miner Recordings; Format: CD, LP, Digital distribution

== Music videos ==
Year	Song	Director
2011	"Last Man Under the Sun"	Daniel Toader
2012	"Silver Tear"	Daniel Toader
