= Sixth June =

German-Serbian musical group

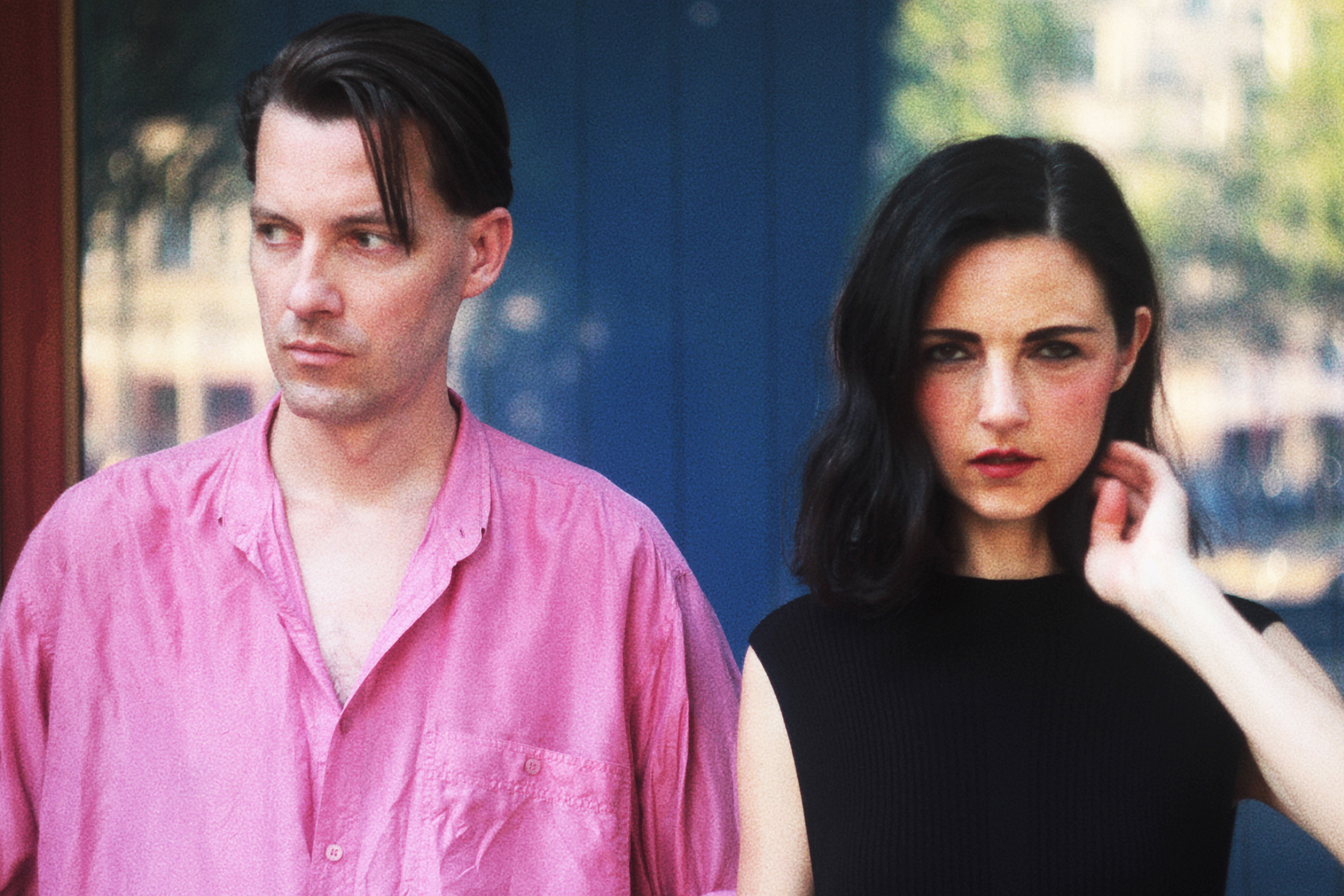
- Sixth June in Berlin during 2025.

Background information
- Origin: Berlin, Germany; Belgrade, Serbia
- Genres: Synthpop; Post-punk; New Wave; Electropop
- Years active: 2007–present
- Labels: Genetic Music, Mannequin Records, Aufnahme + Wiedergabe, The state51 Conspiracy, Sweet Sensation, Young & Cold Records
- Members: Laslo Antal; Lidija Andonov
- Website: https://sweetsensationmusic.com/sixth-june/

Sixth June are an audio/visual project from Berlin with origins in Belgrade, formed in 2007 by visual artist Laslo Antal and actress Lidija Andonov. All their releases have seen the pair explore multiple sides to their dark cinematic post new wave sound.

== History ==
In 2009 Sixth June performed at Exit Festival in Novi Sad. In 2010, they moved to Berlin and released their first album Everytime on the German label Genetic Music and appeared at BIMfest in Antwerp. The Sixth June Video “Oh no it's burning” was part of the Berlin Music Week. On sixth June, 2011, they released the EP Back For A Day.

In 2012, they performed at Wave-Gotik-Treffen in Germany. In 2013, they released the mini album Pleasure and appeared at Nuit Fantastique in Brussels and Summer Darkness in Utrecht. After their Berghain concert in 2014, the Berliner Zeitung described their sound as "sweet, cool, dark elektropop" and close to Propaganda or Depeche Mode. Music videos and live projections are a large part of the performance of Sixth June, adding a theatrical aspect. Having two people in the band who are closely connected to film, theatre and video art helps Sixth June be recognizable not only by the music but by the visual image they create as well. After the release of their Pleasure EP (in December 2013), peek-a-boo magazine described their work as: The music from Laslo Antal and Lidija Andonov sounds indeed very 80’s, but at the same time contemporary as well. After hearing their brand new 5 tracks 12" EP Pleasure, I feel like to use these words again....

== Name and influences ==
Sixth June's band name has no concrete reference to June 6 in history. Their music is strongly influenced by 1980s Dark culture bands and their albums, such as Seventeen Seconds (The Cure, 1980), Music for the Masses (Depeche Mode, 1987), Dead Can Dance (1984), Mask (Bauhaus, 1981). Formative is Lidija Andonov's warm melancholic voice.

== Discography ==
- Everytime (2010) – Genetic Music / No Emb Blanc
- Back For A Day, EP (2011) – Mannequin Records
- Pleasure, EP (2013) – Mannequin Records
- Virgo Rising (2017) - aufnahme+wiedergabe
- Without a sign (demos and unreleased tracks, 2018) - aufnahme+wiedergabe
- Trust (2020) - The state51 Conspiracy
- 1984 (2021) - Sweet Sensation
- Stay! (2024) - Sweet Sensation / Young & Cold Records
- After the war, EP (2025) - Sweet Sensation / Young & Cold Records

== Videos ==
- Everytime (2007, in Novi Sad)
- Oh No it's Burning (2008, in Subotica)
- Come Closer (2011, in Berlin)
- Back for a day (2011, in Berlin)
- Drowning (2014)
- Night before (2017)
- Nebo (2017)
- Other Side of Love (2018)
- Call me, II (2018)
- In Dreams (2019)
- Winter didn't Come (2020)
- Negde Neko (2020)
- Read all my dreams - short film (2020)
- Sanjam (2023)
- Tišina (2024)
