= Kal (band) =

Serbian Romani band

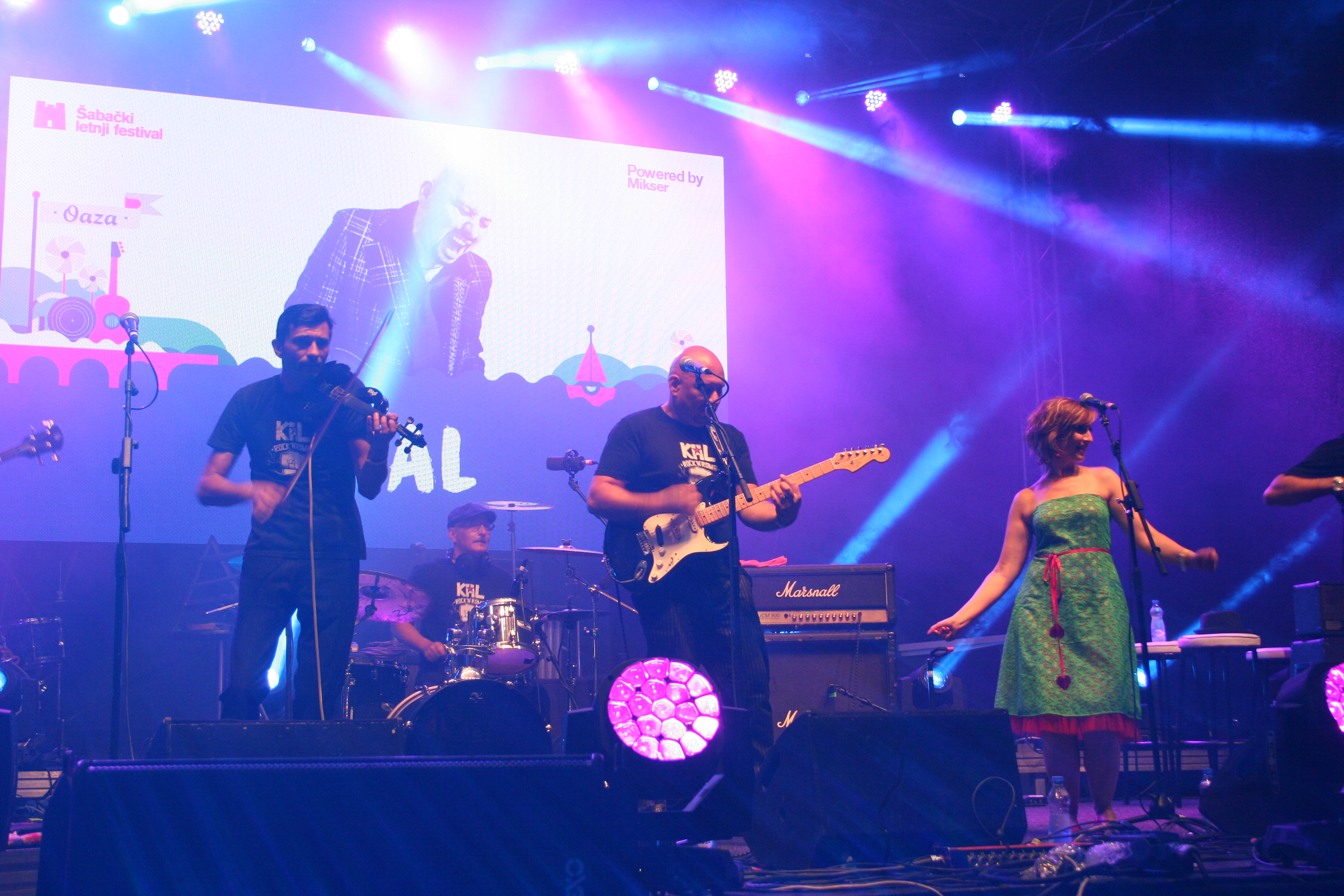

Background information
- Origin: Valjevo, Serbia
- Genres: World; Romani music
- Years active: 1996–present
- Labels: B92; Asphalt Tango Records
- Members: Dragan Ristić; Dejan Jovanović; Milorad Jevremović; Ivan Kuzev; Miloš Veličković
- Past members: Branko Isaković; Aleksandar Andrić

Kal (Romani for 'black') is a Serbian Romani world music band. Originally from Valjevo, they are now based in Belgrade. They attracted Serbian and worldwide public interest with their eponymous debut album, released in 2006, presenting a blend of traditional Balkan Romani music with influences of tango, Middle Eastern, Turkish, and even Jamaican influences.

Kal was formed in 1996, and they participated in several compilation album with other Romani, Serbian and world music performers. Their first national TV appearance was in a B92 show Timofejev in New Year's Eve 2006, where they presented their unique style.

During 2006, Kal toured over a hundred concerts worldwide, including most of the European countries and the United States. They participated in Sziget Festivals (in 2001, 2002, and 2004), La notte di San Lorenzo in Milan, and 11th European biennale of young artists in Athens, Exit in Novi Sad in 2004 and 2005, and featured in 2006 World Music Expo, WOMEX. In April 2006, the album reached the first position of World Music Charts Europe and ended up 3rd in the annual list.

The band, particularly the frontman Dragan Ristić, are also politically and socially engaged, fighting the prejudices and Anti-Romani sentiment. Dragan and his brother Dušan founded the Amala Summer School in Serbia, a workshop of Romani language, history, culture heritage, and political power.

== Lineup ==
- Dragan Ristić – Vocals, Guitar,
- Aleksandra Veljković-Vocals
- Milorad Šalajko Jevremovć – Vocals, Violin
- Rade Arsenović – Accordion
- Marko Ćurčić – Bass Guitar
- Dušan Gnjidić – Drums

== Discography ==
=== Compilations ===
- Violeta & Kal: Budva '97 (1997, Komuna Belgrade)
- Balkan Ambience (1998, Marko's music, Bulgaria)
- World Rhythms (1998, United One Records, Germany)
- A zenne unnepe (2000, France Cultural Institute)
- Romano Suno (2003, B92 Records)
- Serbia Sounds Global 3 (2003, B92 Records)

=== Albums ===
- Kal (2006) (B92 /reissued internationally Asphalt Tango)
- Radio Romanista (2009) (B92 / Asphalt Tango)
- Romology (2013) ARC music (UK) City Records, Multimedia records Serbia), Lou rocked boys (Poland)
