= Kendi (musician) =

Serbian musician

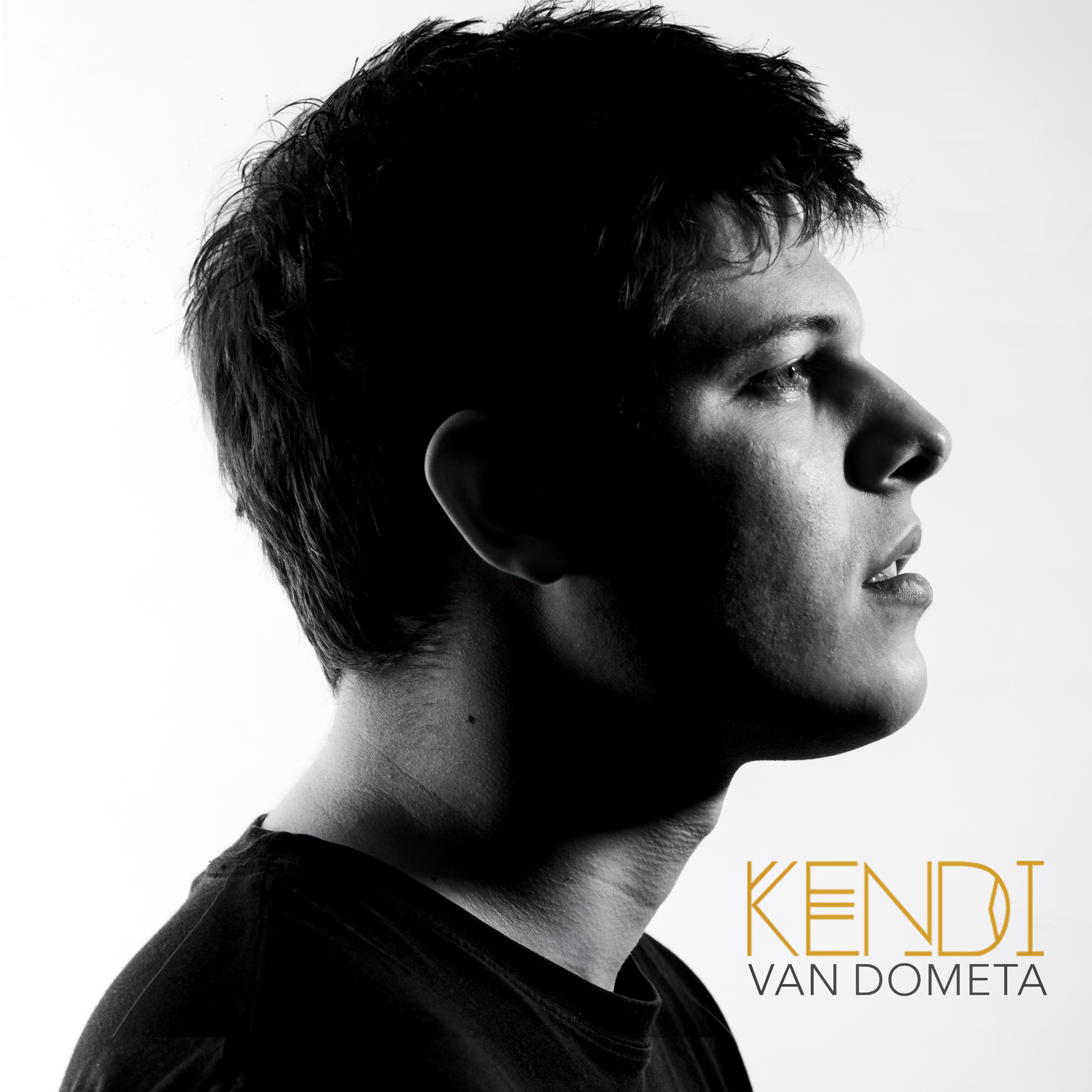
- Kendi on the cover of his album Van dometa

Background information
- Also known as: Kendi, Cantwait, Pablo Kenedi
- Born: Milan Sisojević; 1 October 1989 (age 37); Aleksinac, SR Serbia, Yugoslavia
- Genre: Hip-hop
- Occupations: Rapper; singer
- Years active: 2006–present
- Labels: Bassivity; Aristokrat Muzik

Milan Sisojević, (Serbian Cyrillic: Милан Сисојевић; born 1 October 1989) known by his stage names Kendi, Cantwait and Pablo Kenedi, is a Serbian rapper.

== Discography ==
=== Albums and EPs ===
- Preko noći (feat. B.k.o., 2009)
- Seks i nasilje Vol. 1 (feat. Freeman, 2009)
- Seks i nasilje Vol. 2 (feat. Nik, 2010)
- Produkt Vol. 1
- Produkt Vol. 2 (2012)
- Lak na obaraču (2013)
- Van dometa (2014)
- Papirni avioni (Koolade, 2017)
- Krzno i suze (2018)
- Trap je mrtav (2019)
- Dodirne tačke (2023)
- Krivolov (2024)

=== Singles and collaborations ===
- Srp, satara i nož (feat. Krang, Krenk Sinatra, Kovlaj, 2011)
- Nismo istog kalibra (2011)
- Nismo istog kalibra Pt. 2 (feat. Rema, Mlađi referent, 2012)
- Stampedo (feat. Struka, 2012)
- Kratak fitilj (feat. Plema, Andrea, Dusdhawn, 2012)
- Ne seri (2013)
- Flomaster (feat. Deda, Majki P, 2013)
- Baba (feat. Marčelo, Nensi, 2014)
- Prevaspitaj đecu (feat. Who See, Random, 2014)
- Litice (2015)
- Luka (feat. Deniro, Magic Sone)
- Pumpanje (feat. Deda, Majki P, Furio Đunta, DJ Mrki, 2015)
- Mighty 5'ves REPRE5ENT (feat. Frenkie, Dedduh/Who See, Mrigo, General Woo, 2015)
- Prava ljubav (2016)
- Limun & lajm (2016)
- Tajči (feat. Furio Đunta, 2016)
- Kune & dinari (feat. G.I.R., Koolade, 2016)
- Sentimentalno putovanje (feat. 3man, 2016)
- Nostalgija (feat. Looney, 2016)
- Zlatni kadilak (feat. Igla, 2017)
- Elektricitet (feat. Đare, 2017)
- Za kraj (feat. Lefthandshort, 2017)
- Vanzemaljski (2018)
- Rep apokalipsa (feat. Riga Dri, 2018)
- Lice meduze (feat. Sivilo, Reksona, 2018)
- Danas samo bih ljubav (feat. Ivan Beloševac, 2018)
- Moja mala sve razume (feat. Grzi, Struka, Papi Jaaz, 2018)
- Formula (2019)
- Ugasi svetla(feat. Maat Bandy, 2019)
