= Bombarder =

Bosnian speed metal and thrash metal band

- Origin: Sarajevo, SR Bosnia and Herzegovina
- Genres: Speed metal, thrash metal
- Years active: 1986 – present
- Labels: Panonija Koncert, Explosive Records, One Records, Walk Records
- Members: Nenad Kovačević; Ivan Maksić; Predrag Šarić; Milan Janković; Gvozden Racić
- Past members: Maho Šiljdedić; Zlatko Slatinac; Jasmin Lamađema; Senad Ljubunčić; Senad Marava; Fadil Ramadanović; Jakša Vlahović; Rastko Ličina; Edin Jusić
- Website: Official MySpace

Bombarder is a Bosnian and former Yugoslav speed/thrash metal band. Bombarder was originally formed in 1986 in Sarajevo, SR Bosnia and Herzegovina, at the time part of SFR Yugoslavia. During the Bosnian War, during which guitarist Maho Šiljdedić died, vocalist Nenad Kovačević moved to Serbia, where he reformed Bombarder in the new lineup.

== Discography ==
=== Studio albums ===
- Speed Kill (1989)
- Bez milosti (1989)
- Crni dani (1995)
- Ko sam ja (1997)
- Ledena krv (2003)
- Ima li života prije smrti (2010)
- Okot iz pakla (2016)

=== Compilation albums ===
- Bez balads - Najbolje (2000)

=== Video albums ===
- Bombarder: Sarajevo - Novi Sad (1991)
