= Overdrive (band) =

Serbian hardcore/metalcore band

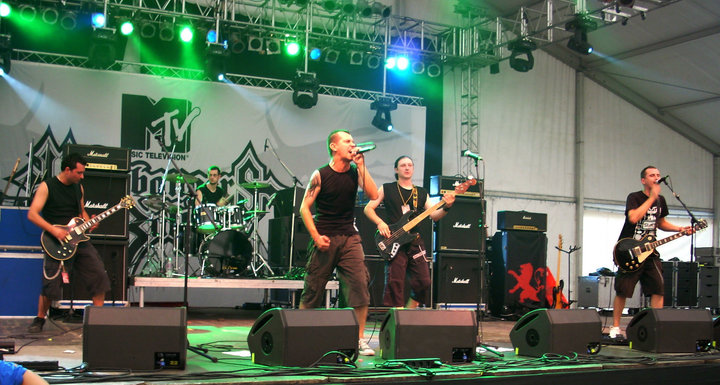
- Overdrive performing live at the Sziget Festival in 2010

Background information
- Origin: Zrenjanin, Serbia
- Genres: Hardcore punk, metalcore
- Years active: 1994–present
- Labels: Boa Records, PGP-RTS, Exit Music
- Members: Dragan Midorović; Damir Milutinov; Aleksandar Midorović; Nebojša Mitrović; Nemanja Konstantinović
- Past members: Aleksandar Vujnov; Branislav Đerić; Slobodan Levakov; Dragan Živković

Overdrive is a Serbian hardcore punk/metalcore band from Zrenjanin.

== History ==
The band was formed in 1992 by Dragan Midorović (guitar). The band performed as a cover band with various band lineups until the arrival of Damir Milutinov (vocals) and Aleksandar Midorović (guitar), when they started writing their own material. The band released their debut album No More Words through the independent record label Boa Records. Beside the three members, the album also featured Aleksandar Vujnov (bass guitar) and Nebojša Mitrović (drums).

The follow-up, the album Everything's Fine, featured the new drummer Branislav Đerić. Live versions of the songs from the first two studio albums were included on the third studio album Movement, released through PGP-RTS. The album also featured a cover version of the Madonna song "Erotica". The album was recorded with Dragan Živković (bass guitar) and Slobodan Levakov (drums).

In 2010, the band released their fourth studio album Explode for free download through the Exit Music record label.

Band recorded their first track in Serbian in 2012, a cover of the old folk classic Ova naša livada, which they still perform live today.

In 2017, the band reactivated after longer hiatus, featuring new bass guitarist, Nemanja Konstantinović.

Overdrive again entered the studio in 2018 to record a new single, again completely sung in Serbian. Dembelija is a track actually inspired by a children's song.

The video for the single I Found My Way Out premiered in early February 2024.

Overdrive has performed as an opening band for Pro-Pain, Soulfly, The Prodigy, Slayer, Korn, and other acts.

== Discography ==
=== Studio albums ===
- No More Words (1997)
- Everything's Fine (2000)
- Movement (2004)
- Explode (2010)
