= The Stone (band) =

Serbian black metal band

- Origin: Belgrade, Serbia
- Genre: Black metal
- Years active: 1996−present
- Labels: Demonion; CCP; Wolfcult; Solistitum; Eclipse; Pagan Flames; Folter; Undercover; Grom; Zero Budget Records; Slava Satan; Diabolist; Miner; Necroterror; Mizantropeon; Immortal Frost
- Members: Glad; Kozeljnik; Vrag; Honza Kapák
- Past members: (see below)
- Website: thestonehorde.com

The Stone is a Serbian black metal band formed in Belgrade in 1996. Originally known as Stone to Flesh, they changed their name to The Stone in 2001.

== Biography ==
The Stone started in 1996 as Stone to Flesh. In February '97, they recorded their first demo, Serbian Woods, and made their first live appearances. The Killed by the Sun demo was taped a year after. Greek label Demonion Productions reached the band to release both demos as their first official release, Unveiled Evil. In winter 1999/2000, the band recorded the album Some Wounds Bleed Forever, which CCP Records released.

After renaming to The Stone in 2001, the band signed to Wolfcult Productions (Solistitium Productions). In spring of 2002, they released Slovenska krv ("Slavic Blood"), their second full-length album and first as The Stone. Meanwhile, the "Tragom hromoga vuka" CD was out in March '03, with two new songs and both demos.

In 2003, Awaken Productions, a label operated by the bassist of The Stone, released Аветињски плес сабласти, a cassette compilation of Judas Iscariot. The release included the albums To Embrace the Corpses Bleeding and Moonlight Butchery, with the titles translated into Serbian and printed in Cyrillic script.

In winter 2003/'04, "Zakon Velesa" ("The Law of Veles"), the band recorded their third album, and released it a few months after. They left Solistitium Records.

In December 2004, Czech label Eclipse Productions released the Čujete li, smeju nam se mrtvi EP, consisting of two new tracks.

In August 2005, The Stone signed with Folter Records. By the end of June 2006, they released fourth album Magla ("The Fog"). A few months later, Undercover Records released alive 7-inch split EP with Czech Inferno Pagan Flames Productions (US) released a split DVD with May Result. During the next couple of years, the band was active performing live. Serbian label Grom Records reissued the debut record with different artwork, different album name, two bonus tracks, and a video.

In winter of 2008, The Stone entered "Draft" studio to record four songs for the 10-inch MLP Old Wounds Bleed Misanthropy. Two old songs were re-recorded, as well as some cover versions of Slayer and Master's Hammer, to be released on Diabolist Services Cult (US) during 2009. Czech label Zero Budget Production has released The Stone's first demo, "Serbian Woods", on limited 7-inch picture vinyl and also Folter Records released a limited vinyl version of now The Stone's classic second album "Slovenska krv" ("Slavic Blood").

The band was very active with live gigs during 2008 and on October 4 entered the studio in order to record their fifth full-length album titled "Umro" ("Deceased") which will be released in April 2009 through Folter Records. This was considered to be by far the most mature release by the band. At the same time, two more songs were recorded and used for a release of split 7-inch EP titled "The Ancestral Alliance" with Italian band Kult. Also German mini tour with Lugubre was settled for the end of April as well as more live appearances, including extensive touring through Europe with Romanian band Negura Bunget in 2010.

2011 saw the release of band's sixth full-length album "Golet" ("The Barrenness") and again through Berlin-based Folter Records. 15 September was chosen as a date of release, the same day The Stone was to embark on a European tour in support of cult Seattle black metal group Inquisition, here also followed by Portuguese band Corpus Christii and Canada's Revenge.

== Band members ==
=== Current ===
- Glad – vocals (2006–2011, 2018–present)
- Kozeljnik – guitars (1996–present)
- Vrag - bass (2015–present)
- Honza Kapák - drums (2016–present)

=== Former ===
- Nefas – vocals (1996–2006, 2011–2018), vocals (only studio) (2006–2011)
- Ilija Vasiljević – drums (2001–2003)
- Blizzard – guitars (1996–1998)
- God Of Perversion – bass (1996–2001)
- Adimiron – drums (1996–2001)
- Aksinomantijan – drums (2003–2006)
- Ved – drums (2006–2007)
- Urok - keyboards (2001–2011)
- Usud - bass (2011–2015), live drums (2012–2020)
- L.G. - drums (2007–2016)
- Demonetras – guitars (2004–2020)

=== Session ===
- Odious – bass (2011)

== Discography ==
=== Studio albums ===
- Some Wounds Bleed Forever (2000) as Stone to Flesh
- Slovenska Krv ("Slavic Blood") (2002)
- Zakon Velesa ("The Law of Veles") (2004)
- Magla ("The Fog") (2006)
- Umro ("Deceased") (2009)
- Golet ("The Barrenness") (2011)
- Crna Hronika ("Black Chronicle") (2013)
- Nekroza ("Necrosis") (2014)
- Teatar Apsurda ("Theatre of the Absurd") (2017)
- Kosturnice ("Ossuaries") (2021)
- Kletva ("Curse") (2025)

=== EPs ===
- Čujete Li, Smeju Nam Se Mrtvi... (2004)
- Triumph Dark Brotherhood (2007)
- The Ancestral Alliance (2009)
- Old Wounds Bleed Misanthropy (2010)
- Kruna praha (2019)

=== Compilation albums ===
- Unveiled Evil (1999) as Stone to Flesh
- Tragom Hromog Vuka ("Tracking the Limping Wolf") (2003)
- Neke Rane Krvare Večno ("Some Wounds Bleed Forever") (2007)

=== Demos ===
- Serbian Woods (1997) as Stone to Flesh
- Killed by the Sun (1998) as Stone to Flesh
