= Samaʼ Abdulhadi =

Palestinian techno DJ (born 1990)

Samaʼ Abdulhadi سما عبد الهادي
- Born: 1990 (age 35–36); Jordan
- Origin: Palestinian
- Genres: Techno
- Occupations: DJ, music producer
- Years active: 2010–present

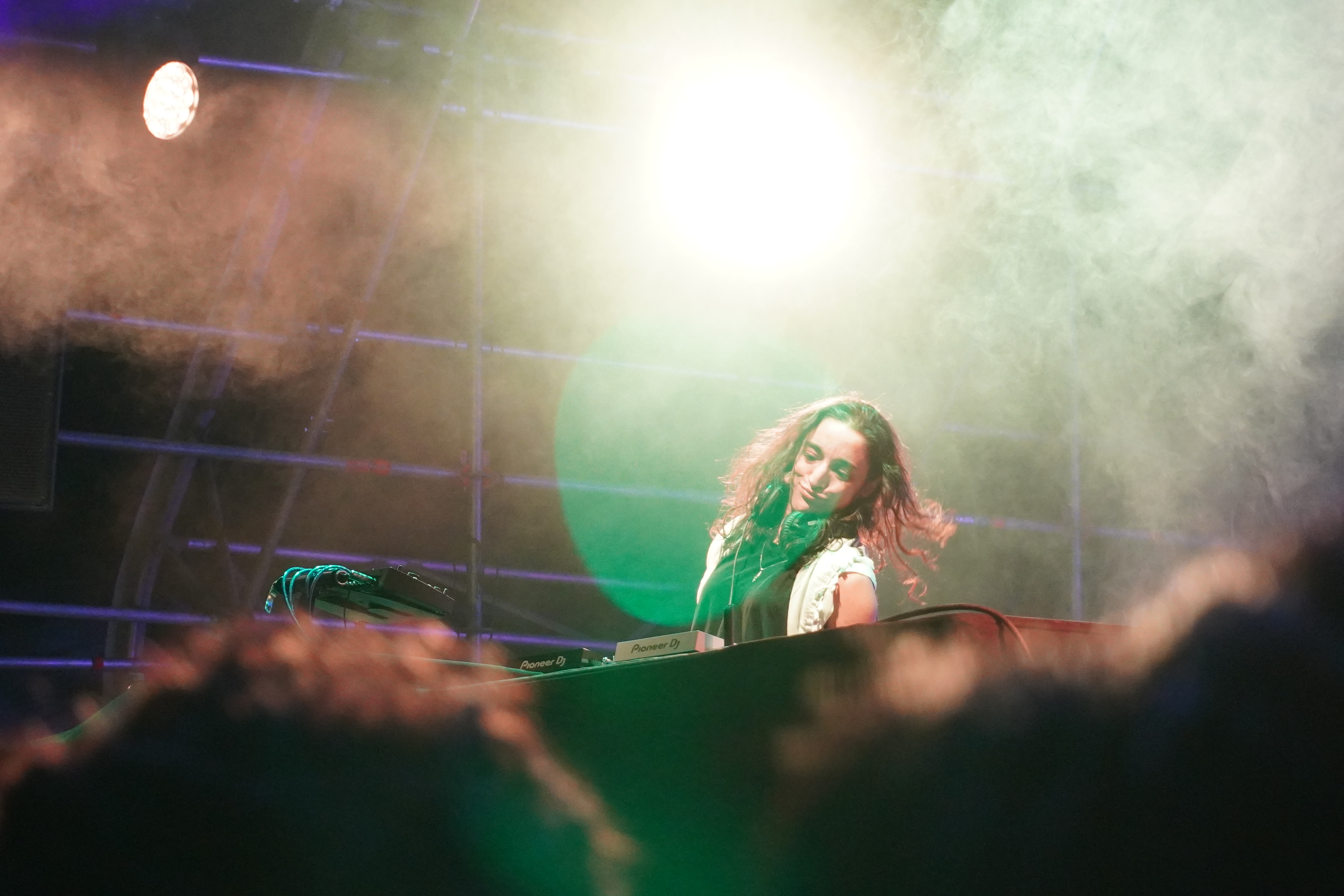
Sama' Abdulhadi at the 53rd Festival Internacional Cervantino (FIC), 2025. Event at Los Pastitos in Guanajuato, Mexico.

Samaʼ Abdulhadi (سما عبد الهادي Samā ʿAbd al-Hādī; born 1990) is a Palestinian techno DJ and music producer, known as the "queen of the Palestinian techno scene".

== Life ==
Abdulhadi was born in Jordan, to a family deported from Palestine after her grandmother, Issam Abdulhadi, organized a sit-in and hunger strike at the Church of the Holy Sepulchre in Jerusalem in 1969. In 1993 the family was allowed to return to Palestine, and lived in Ramallah. When she was 13, during the Second Intifada the IDF took over her apartment block, forcing the family to live on the roof for three days. Abdulhadi played for the Palestine national football team before an injury cut her football career short.

Studying sound design in Beirut, Abdulhadi encountered techno music after hearing a set by the Japanese DJ Satoshi Tomiie. She moved to Cairo to work as a sound engineer, and started to DJ across the Middle East. In 2018 she returned to Ramallah to perform a set for the online broadcaster Boiler Room. Around this time, she joined the collective Sodassi. As of June 2025, her Ramallah DJ set has been viewed over 14 million times on YouTube. That year Abdulhadi started the Union Collective, to provide a safe space to platform other DJs in Palestine.

In 2020 the Palestinian Authority granted her a permit to perform at the mosque and events space Nabi Musa, but religious Palestinians stormed the venue and forced her to stop the party. She was arrested and jailed on the charge of desecreating a religious site. Her court date has been pushed back three times.

In 2022 Abdulhadi was due to curate part of the Palestine Music Expo, but political instability caused the event to be cancelled. In early 2023 she had a four-week residency at the London club Phonox. In April 2023 she launched a new underground music platform, Resilience, with two fundraising parties in Beirut. At the start of October 2023 she announced that a new mix compilation, fabric presents Samaʼ Abdulhadi, would be released on 24 November.

In 2025, Sama' Abdulhadi pulled out of her scheduled performance at Sónar Festival in Barcelona, as part of a widespread boycott by artists over the festival's ties to investment firm KKR, which had acquired a stake in its parent company and was accused of links to companies operating in occupied Palestinian Territories.
