= Solomun =

Solomun is a Croatian surname of Biblical origin, referring to King Solomon.

Notable people with the name include:

- Mladen Solomun (born 1975), Bosnian-German DJ best known as Solomun
- Ivica Solomun (born 1968), Croatian football player and manager
