= Juvelen =

- Also known as: Juvelen
- Born: Jonas Pettersson; 15 July 1976 (age 49); Stockholm, Sweden
- Genres: Pop, Electronic, Dance
- Occupations: Singer-songwriter
- Years active: 2000–present
- Labels: Hybris
- Website: www.juvelen.com

Jonas Pettersson (born 15 July 1976), better known as Juvelen (the Jewel), is an electro-pop singer from Stockholm, Sweden. Pettersson was previously a member of the indie pop band Pine Forest Crunch in the 1990s and the synthpop band Camera in the early 2000s. His music has been described as "electronic falsetto pop with a fragrance of soul music". His music is influenced by Prince, among others.

The song They Don't Love You from his debut album 1 features in the Samsung Tocco Ultra advert.

== Discography ==
=== Album ===
- 2007: Juvelen (Hybris)
- 2008: 1 (Hybris)

=== EPs ===
- 2008: Don't Mess (Hybris)
- 2011: Make U Move (Hybris)

=== Singles ===
- 2007: Watch Your Step
- 2008: Private Dancer – Rocca feat. Juvelen (Every Conversation Records, Tokyo)
- 2009: They Don't Love You
- 2010: All-Time High (Whisper)
- 2012: For Only U (Hybris)
