= Davide Squillace =

Italian DJ and record producer

- Born: Davide Squillace; December 6, 1977 (age 47); Siena, Italy
- Origin: Siena
- Genres: Electronic music, Contemporary, Techno
- Occupation(s): DJ, Music writer, producer, remixer,
- Years active: 1999–present
- Labels: Ovum, Sci+Tec, Morris Audio, Resopal Schallware, Supernature, CMYK, Adagio, Viva, Nervous, Saved, Shake, Rillis
- Website: thisandthatlab.com

Davide Squillace (born 6 December 1977) is a DJ and producer from Italy, and the founder of several record labels.

== Early life ==
Born in Siena, Italy, his family moved back to its home town, Naples, just after his birth. In Naples, he developed a genuine interest in electronic music, thanks to the famous local scene. After finishing school, in 1995, he went to London, where he lived for three years. In London, he was fascinated by the British scene and he began buying the first music equipments to produce techno music and managed to have his first record published by Primate Records. Soon other labels got interested in his work and he published more EPs with Audio and Contrast. In 1999, he went back to Naples, where he began studying at the local school of sound engineering, graduating in two years. During these years, he did not published lot of music, but he focused on studying and working in the neapolitan techno clubs where he became very famous alongside Marco Carola and Rino Cerrone.

== Career ==
In 2004, Davide left Naples for Barcelona. In the following years, he released Ep's for labels such as Ovum, Sci+Tec, Morris Audio, Resopal Schallware, Supernature, CMYK, Adagio, Viva, Nervous, Saved, Shake, Rillis. These releases led to appearances at venues such as Circoloco, where he has been a resident since 2007, Coachella, Sónar, Womb, Berghain and many more. He also created several labels, releasing his own music, but also from other artists: Sketch, Minisketch, Vir, 500, Titbit and Hideout. His side project, Better Lost Than Stupid sees Davide collaborate with fellow revered DJ’s: Martin Buttrich and Matthias Tanzmann.

== Selected discography ==
- High Endurance E.P. (10", EP, Pur) Primate Recordings 1998
- Organik (12") Cloned Vinyl 1998
- Fried Mix EP (12", EP) Design Music 1999
- Liquid Brain E.P. (12", EP) Conform, Conform 1999
- Mounths Mood EP (12") Fine Audio Recordings 1999
- 01 (12") Sketch Music Architecture 2001
- 02 (12") Sketch Music Architecture 2001
- Appendix B (12") Southsoul Appendix 2001
- Yukiko EP (12") Sketch Music Architecture 2001
- 03 (12") Sketch Music Architecture 2002
- 04 (12") Sketch Music Architecture 2002
- Shake Records Ref.01 (12") Shake Records 2002
- Smack (12") Definition Records 2002
- 05 (12") Sketch Music Architecture 2003
- Controllin' Pieces (12") SuperBra 2003
- Plastic Floor (12") Shake Records 2003
- Southbound EP (12", EP) Analytic Trail 2003
- Body League (12") Shake Records 2004
- Childhood Heroes EP (12", EP) Genetic Recordings 2004
- Hard Angel (12") Audiolove Music 2004
- Ice On Graz (12") Sketch Music Architecture 2004
- Massive Storm (12") Orion Muzik 2004
- 4 Ever White (12") MiniSketch 2005
- Get The Right Shuffle (12") Sketch Music Architecture 2005
- Ipso Facto Day (12") Sketch Music Architecture 2005
- Antigravitational / Realistic (12") Sketch Music Architecture 2006
- Bike On The Rocks / Changing Guards (12") Kombination Research 2006
- Make Me... (12", Promo, W/Lbl) MiniSketch 2006
- Minisketch 3 (12") MiniSketch 2006
- Panik Reinterpretation (12", Cle) Resopal Schallware 2006
- Almond Eyes EP (12", EP) Ovum Recordings 2007
- Rosso Pomodoro (12") Cmyk Musik 2007
- It's All About Toe (12") Adagio 2008
- Westside Story (with Luca Bachetti) (12") Hideout 2009
- Cherry On the Cake (with Andrea Ferlin) (10") M500 2009
- One Lobster, Please (with Michele Tabucchi) (12") SCI + TEC Digital Audio 2009
- Black Cabbage Soup EP (12") Supernature 2009
- What About The Vice (12") Desolat 2009
- Pigwings (with Phutura) (12") Titbit 2010
- Around The Bay (with Luca Bachetti) (12") Hideout 2010
- Tutti Frutti (12") Hideout 2010
- That Ginger Ponytail (with Guti) (12") Hideout 2010
- Crocodile Tears (12") Hideout 2011
- Manifesto (12") This and That 2012
- Wild Things (with Philip Bader) (12") This and That 2012
- The Other Side Of Hustler (with Guti) (12") This and That 2012
- The Love Story Teller (12") Result 2012
- Goiânia (12") Cadenza 2012
- Gualicho (with Marcello Burlon) (12") This and That 2015
- Once Upon a Time In Napoli (2 x LP) Crosstown Rebels 2018
