= Jade (producer) =

Hungarian drum and bass record producer

Jade Gábor Simon
- Born: Simon Gabor; 1978 or 1979 (age 46–47); Budapest, Hungary
- Genre: Drum and bass
- Occupations: Record producer; DJ; architecture engineer
- Labels: EATBRAIN; Moving Shadow; Blackout; Citrus

Simon Gabor (Hungarian: Gábor Simon), also known professionally by his stage name Jade, is a Hungarian drum and bass record producer, DJ, founder of the Eatbrain record label and architecture engineer.

== Career ==
=== Pre-career ===
In the late 1990s, Jade bought himself a record player and started practicing at home to become a DJ and later started to produce his own music. At the beginning of his production career, he uploaded his early tracks anonymously to an online column called "Music To Your Ears" where a drum and bass producer named SKC, took an interest in his work and helped Jade along his way with constructive comments and instructions. In addition to the help from SKC, he has also spend a private studio session with Chris.SU which gave him another boost in producing his own music.

=== First release ===
After his first release at Black Sun Empire Recordings, his career has started to take off and since then, 50 different tracks of his have been published by 15 different record labels and have been pressed on vinyl as well. It was through his early releases that Jade pioneered the emerging sound known as neurofunk. In 2009, Jade released his debut album, Venom, on Citrus Recordings while his tracks like "No Cure" and the eponymous "Venom" featuring RymeTyme helped define the neurofunk genre. In 2011, Jade established his own label named Eatbrain.

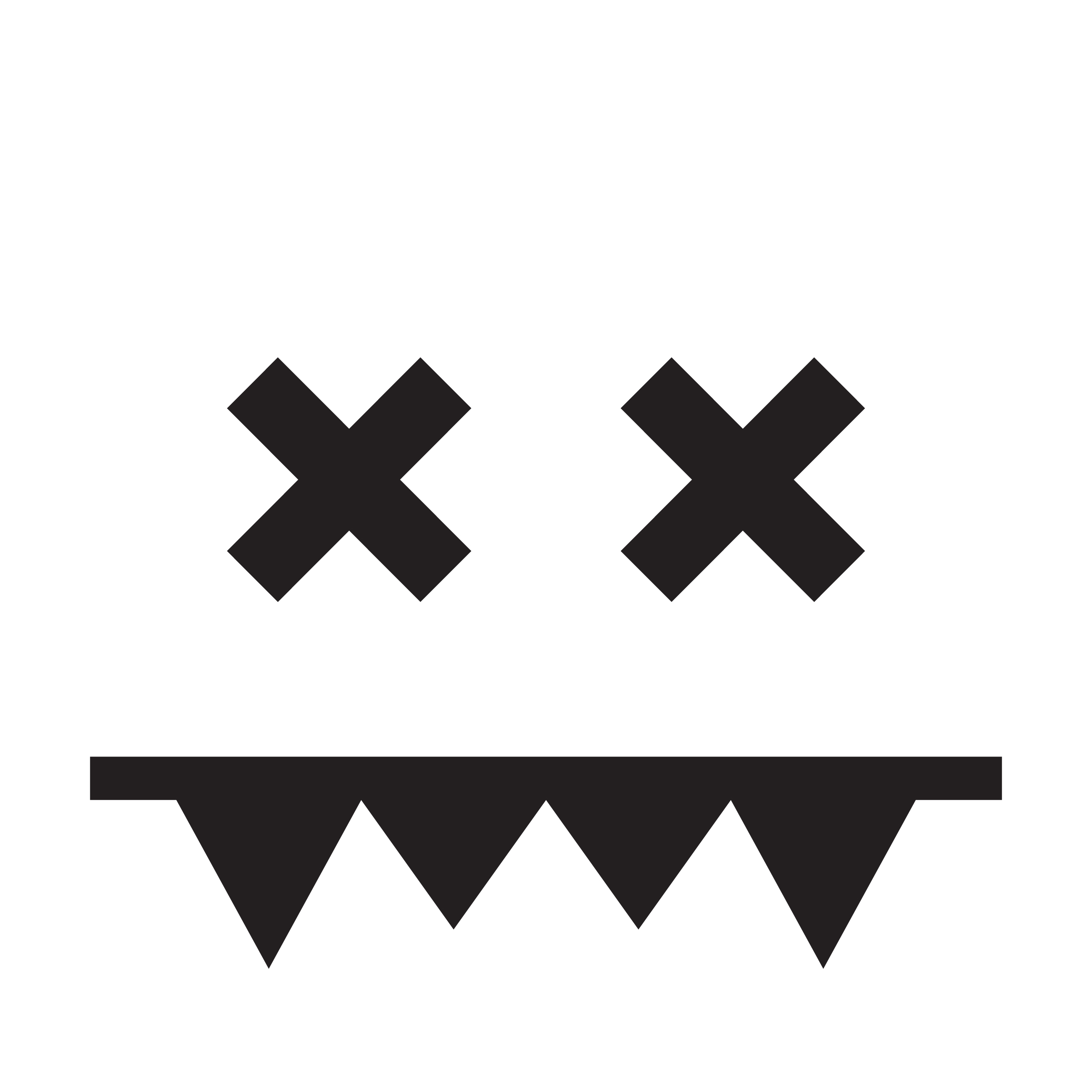
Logo of the drum and bass record label, Eatbrain

== Discography ==
=== Studio albums ===
- Venom (2009)

=== Extended plays ===
- Cryptic / Ready / The Prey on Ready (2008)
- Lazer Tag (2012)
- Signs: Naked Lunch / Vermin (2015)
- What You Are (2016)
- Chris.SU: Solar Eclipse EP /Chris.SU, Jade & Mindscape - Solar Eclipse (2017)
- State Of Mind: Automata EP / Grape Juice (2017)
- Awake (2018)
- Telekinesis: Beware EP / Numbers (2018)
- Propaganda (2018)
- Fourward: Torn Place EP / Make Some (2018)
- Rido: Rido & The Gang EP / Maze (2019)
- Gancher & Ruin: Reflection EP / Reflection (2019)
- ClashTone: Ninja Scroll EP (2019)

=== Singles ===
- Smash Face / Test Subject (2012)
- Santoku011 / Mayhem & Logam - Ouroboros (Jade Remix) (2015)
- I'm A Machine (2017)

=== Various Artists ===
- Variations on Black / Black Sun Empire & Jade - Deadhouse (2013)
- Tales Of The Undead LP / Friday The 13th, What You Are (2014)
- Mirror Universe 1 / Jade and State Of Mind - Respirator (2015)
- Mirror Universe 2 / They Are Mutants! (2016)
- Divergence LP / Jade & Mindscape - Outlaw (2018)
- Korsakov Compilations Vol.1. / Jade & Mindscape - Dangerous (2018)
- Cause4Concern: 20 Years / Cause4Concern - Synergy (Jade Remix) (2019)
