= Cubismo =

Croatian music band

Cubismo is a Croatian music band of eleven members playing salsa and latin jazz. The band was formed in 1995 by a gathering of eight eminent musicians from various Croatian music bands. They also featured a Venezuelan vocalist Ricardo Luque.

== Overview ==
The name Cubismo was created from Dizzy Gillespie's piece "Cu-bi Cu-bop", which represents one of the first music mixes of jazz and afro-Cuban music. The name is associated with Cuba as well, which has a music tradition known as the cornerstone of entire music genre made and performed by Cubismo.

Their sound is characterized by multiplicity of instruments and expressively strong dance rhythm produced by a multi-member rhythm section. Besides remakes of standard jazz pieces, popular and traditional Cuban songs, they perform their own pieces.

They are signed with the record label, Aquarius Records (Croatia).

== Albums ==
- 1997: Cubismo
- 1998: Viva La Habana
- 1999 Alegrate mi pueblo / Radujte se narodi
- 2000: Motivo Cubano
- 2002: Junglesalsa
- 2004: Amigos
- 2005: Amigos DVD Live in Lisinski
- 2007 Autobus Calypso
