= No Sleep Festival =

Serbian music festival

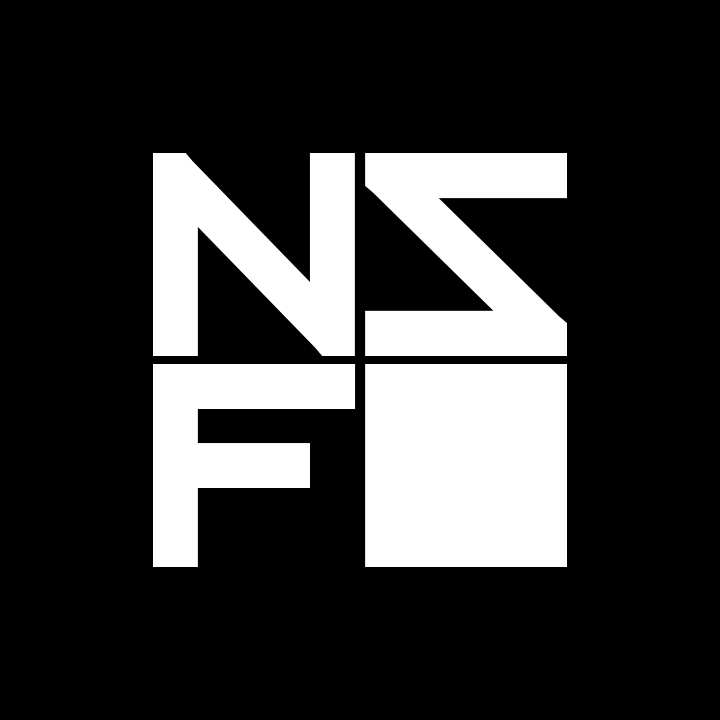
- Official logo
- Genre: Techno, Big beat, House, Synth-pop, EDM, Dance, Electronic
- Dates: 28 November 2026; First Saturday of April and last Saturday of November; First day of EXIT Festival (2017); Two days, starting on the second Friday of April (2022); Two days, starting on the second Friday of November (2018–2022); Third Saturday of November (2023-2024)
- Locations: Hangar, Port of Belgrade, Serbia (2023–present); Petrovaradin Fortress, Novi Sad, Serbia (2017); Multiple locations, Belgrade, Serbia (2018-2022)
- Coordinates: 44.821751°N 20.474539°E
- Years active: 2017–2019, 2022-2024, 2026-present
- Founders: Dušan Kovačević, Ivan Milivojev
- Attendance: 5,500 (2026)
- Website: nosleepfestival.com

No Sleep Festival (Serbian: Но слип фестивал / No slip festival) is a semiannual spring/fall music festival which is held in the city of Belgrade, Serbia.

The festival was founded in 2017 in Novi Sad as a part of the EXIT Festival, influenced by the festival's No Sleep Novi Sad stage, which was introduced in 2002 as HappyNoviSad stage. The first edition of the festival was held during the first day of the EXIT Festival, at the festival's Dance Arena, and it attracted 20,000 visitors. In 2018, it became a stand-alone festival, as it was moved from the Petrovaradin Fortress to Belgrade.

== History ==
The festival began in 2017 as a part of the EXIT Festival. During its existence, No Sleep has been visited by over 45,000 people from more than 60 countries. Resident Advisor, DJ Mag, XLR8R and many others have on numerous occasions praised No Sleep.

The initial idea was created with EXIT's No Sleep Novi Sad stage which quickly gained international fame. Each year, EXIT partners through No Sleep with some of the world's most popular clubs which are showcased at the festival and make launch events. The list includes Fabric, Tresor, Sub Club etc.

In January 2019, No Sleep Festival won the Best New Festival award at the European Festivals Awards held In Groningen, Netherlands.

== Location ==
No Sleep takes place at 11 locations in Belgrade, including the central mammoth warehouse, known as the New Hangar in Port of Belgrade, next to Danube river. It also includes lineups at city's well-known clubs like Drugstore, Club 20/44 and various other spots, with some of the world's most popular electronic music acts, alongside local talents.

== Key Venues ==
=== Hangar Stage 1 ===
Main Hangar is a mammoth warehouse located in Port of Belgrade, next to Danube river. It's located on 39 Žorža Klemansoa Street. It was introduced as the main venue in 2018, along with other nightclubs, such as Drugstore, 20/44 etc.

Hangar Stage 1 hosted Fatboy Slim, Cassius, Lee Burridge, Nina Kraviz, Amelie Lens, Bicep, Kobosil, Terry Francis, Ida Engberg, Artbat, Indira Paganotto and many more.

== Discontinued Venues ==
=== Dance Arena ===
EXIT Festival's Dance Arena on the Petrovaradin Fortress was the venue of the first No Sleep festival in 2017. It is widely considered one of the best electronic arenas in the world. It can host over 25,000 people.

The show on the Dance Arena starts in the evening, and plays all night long, until dawn.

Dance Arena has hosted some of the most influential DJs and producers in the world, such as Jeff Mills, Ellen Allien, Rebekah, Vatican Shadow and many more during both No Sleep and EXIT festivals, and Kobosil, Burak Yeter, Hot Since 82, Solomun, Mau P, Boris Brejcha, Amelie Lens, Nina Kraviz, Yousuke Yukimatsu, Eric Prydz, Indira Paganotto, Sara Landry, Artbat, Vintage Culture, Ofenbach, Maceo Plex, Black Coffee, Henry Saiz, Carl Cox, Bonobo, Sama` Abdulhadi, Barry Can't Swim, Steve Angello, Keinemusik, Mahmut Orhan, Ben Böhmer, Dimitri Vegas & Like Mike, Camelphat, Ida Engberg, Disciples, Adam Beyer, Stephan Bodzin, Blond:ish, Afrojack, Honey Dijon, Monolink, Pan-Pot, Charlotte de Witte, Robin Schulz, Meduza, Paul Kalkbrenner, Ben Klock, Marcel Dettmann, David Guetta, Fatboy Slim, Tale Of Us, Lee Burridge, Richie Hawtin, Martin Garrix, Carl Craig, Guy Gerber, Joseph Capriati, Kölsch, Anfisa Letyago and many more during the EXIT Festival.

=== Drugstore / Mali klub ===
Drugstore also features a smaller nightclub which hosted acts during the night until morning. It was discontinued in 2019.

=== Mint ===
Club Mint is a bar located on 7 Đušina Street in Belgrade. It was discontinued in 2019.

=== Pržionica D59B ===
Pržionica D59B is a coffee shop located on 59 Dobračina Street, hence the name, in Belgrade. It was discontinued in 2019.

=== Tranzit ===
Tranzit is a bar located on 8 Braće Krsmanović Street in Belgrade. It was discontinued in 2019.

=== Taman, Mladost, Gadost and Gajba ===
Taman and Gajba are nightclubs, while Mladost and Gadost are cafes, all located on 44 Karađorđeva Street in Belgrade. All were introduced in 2019, with Taman being discontinued after the first day of the festival, because of a controversy, and the latter three in 2022.

=== Matrez ===
Matrez is a brutalist hangar located in Port of Belgrade, used as the main venue during the 2022 spring edition. It hosted Stephan Bodzin, Nina Kraviz, DVS1 etc.

=== half ===
Half is a nightclub located on 10 Vojvoda Bojović Boulevard. It was introduced in 2019, and discontinued in 2022.

=== Dot ===
Dot is a nightclub located on 6 Francuska Street in Belgrade. It was discontinued in 2022.

=== Drugstore ===
Drugstore is one of the more popular nightclubs in Belgrade, along with 20/44 etc. It is located on 115 despot Stefan Boulevard. Beside the main events, Drugstore also features afterparties.

Drugstore hosted Olof Dreijer, Sébastien Léger etc. It was discontinued in 2023.

=== Ben Akiba ===
Ben Akiba is a nightclub located on 6 Krsmanović brothers Street in Belgrade. It was introduced in 2022, and discontinued the following year.

=== Belgrade silos ===
Belgrade silos are an art center located on 49 Belgrade quay. They have been introduced as a new venue in 2022, and discontinued the following year.

=== Yugovinyl, Dim and Marsh. Open Space ===
Yugovinyl is a vinyl record store, Dim is a bar, and Marsh. Open Space or Marsh Creative Production is a cafe, all of which are located on 15 Cetinjska Street in Belgrade. Marsh. Open Space hosts workshops and exhibitions, along with a music conference with popular international and local speakers. It was discontinued in 2023.

=== 20/44 ===
20/44 is one of the more popular nightclubs in Belgrade. It is located next to the confluence of the Danube and Sava rivers. It was discontinued in 2023.

=== Backstage ===
Backstage is a nightclub located on 4 Makedonska Street in Belgrade. It was introduced in 2022, and discontinued the following year.

== History by years ==
=== No Sleep 2017 ===
The inaugural installment of No Sleep was held during the first day of the 2017 edition of the EXIT Festival on the festival's Dance Arena.

No Sleep Festival 2017 took place 5 July 2017. It was attended by 20,000 people.

The headlining act for No Sleep 2017 included Jeff Mills.

No Sleep Festival presented a combination of various electronic acts, ranging from famous techno and IDM acts to noise music.

=== No Sleep 2018 ===
On 15 July, it was announced that the No Sleep Festival would move from the Petrovaradin Fortress to Belgrade, where it was held at 12 locations.

No Sleep Festival 2018 took place 15–18 November 2018. It was attended by 25,000 people.

The headlining acts for No Sleep 2018 included Fatboy Slim, Cassius, Nina Kraviz and Lee Burridge.

No Sleep Festival presented a combination of various electronic acts, ranging from famous big beat and house acts to synth-pop and electronic dance music.

Besides its two main events, No Sleep Festival also featured daytime parties, workshops and exhibitions, along with a music conference with popular international and local speakers.

=== No Sleep 2019 ===
No Sleep Festival 2019 took place 8–9 November 2019. It was attended by more than 7,000 people during its first day.

The headlining acts for No Sleep 2019 included Amelie Lens, Bicep, Kobosil, Terry Francis and many more.

No Sleep Festival presented a combination of various electronic acts, ranging from famous techno and dance acts to electronic music.

=== No Sleep 2022 ===
No Sleep Festival 2022 took place 8–9 April and 11–12 November 2022. It was attended by 31,000 people in total.

The headlining acts for the spring edition of No Sleep 2022 included Stephan Bodzin, Nina Kraviz and many more.

The headlining acts for the fall edition of No Sleep 2022 included Amelie Lens and many more.

No Sleep Festival presented a combination of various electronic acts, ranging from famous techno acts to house music.

=== No Sleep 2023 ===
No Sleep Festival 2023 took place 11 November 2023. This marked the first year where the festival's two-day format was cut short to one day. It was attended by 10,000 people in total.

The headlining acts for No Sleep 2023 were Artbat.

=== No Sleep 2024 ===
No Sleep Festival 2024 took place 16 November 2024. The headlining acts for No Sleep 2024 was Indira Paganotto.

=== No Sleep 2026 ===
No Sleep Festival 2026 will take place 4 April and 28 November 2026. The headlining acts for the April edition was Indira Paganotto.

== Festival by year ==
Year	Dates	Attendance	Headliners	Notable acts
2017	5 July	20,000	Jeff Mills	Ellen Allien, Rebekah, Vatican Shadow
2018	15–18 November	25,000	Fatboy Slim · Cassius · Lee Burridge · Nina Kraviz	Olof Dreijer
2019	8–9 November	7,000 (day one)	Amelie Lens · Bicep · Kobosil · Terry Francis	N/A
2022 (spring)	8–9 April	15,000	Nina Kraviz · Stephan Bodzin	DVS1, Sébastien Léger
2022 (fall)	11–12 November	16,000	Amelie Lens · Reinier Zonneveld	Ida Engberg, Indira Paganotto
2023	11 November	10,000	Artbat	N/A
2024	16 November	5,500	Indira Paganotto	N/A
2026 (spring)	4 April	5,500	Indira Paganotto	N/A
2026 (fall)	28 November	TBD	TBA	TBA
