= International Dance Music Awards =

Annual awards ceremony

International Dance Music Awards (IDMAs)
- Current: 34th Edition IMDAs
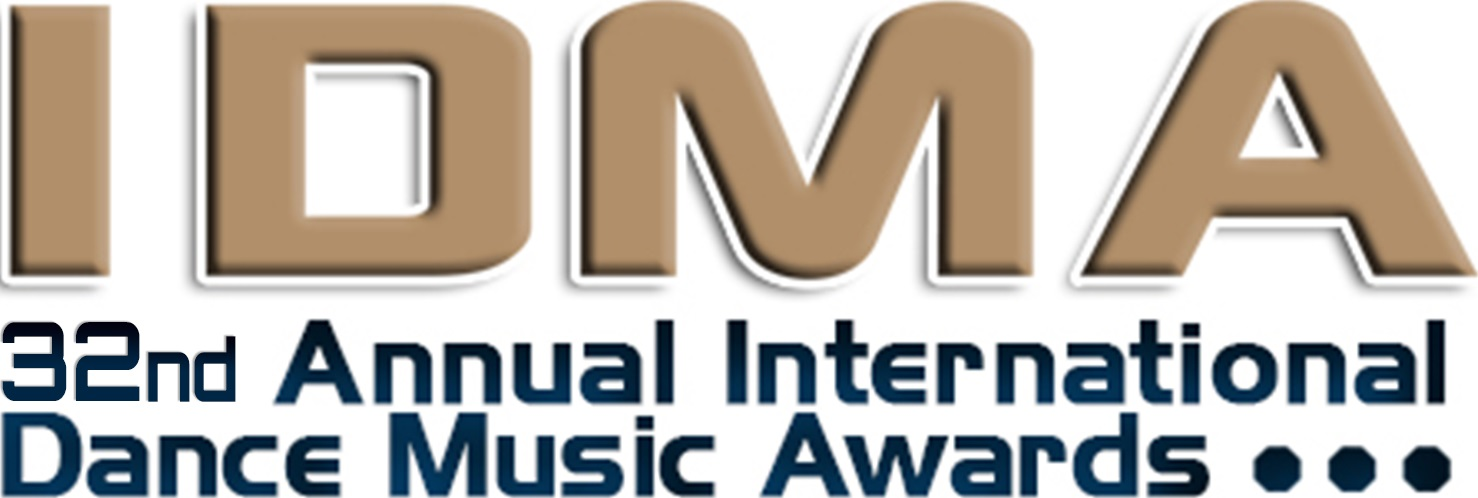
- Logo for the 32nd Annual International Dance Music Awards held in 2018
- Awarded for: Achievements awarded in the Electronic dance music industry
- Location: Miami Beach, Florida, United States
- First award: March 1985; 41 years ago
- Website: wintermusicconference.com/idma/

The International Dance Music Awards or IDMAs was an annual awards ceremony held in Miami Beach, Florida, as part of the Winter Music Conference. The awards were held every year from 1985 to 2020, except for 2017, when the conference was in the process of being purchased by Miami Music Week (the organizers of Ultra Music Festival). The awards returned in 2026.

== Pre–2016 ==
Below are external archive links to all recorded awards ceremonies dating from 1998 to 2016:

- 1998: "31st Annual International Dance Music Awards - Winter Music Conference 2016 - WMC 2016". Archived from the original on 2016-04-16.
- 1999: "31st Annual International Dance Music Awards - Winter Music Conference 2016 - WMC 2016". Archived from the original on 2016-04-16.
- 2000: "31st Annual International Dance Music Awards - Winter Music Conference 2016 - WMC 2016". Archived from the original on 2016-04-16.
- 2001: "31st Annual International Dance Music Awards - Winter Music Conference 2016 - WMC 2016". Archived from the original on 2016-04-16.
- 2002: "31st Annual International Dance Music Awards - Winter Music Conference 2016 - WMC 2016". Archived from the original on 2016-04-16.
- 2003: "31st Annual International Dance Music Awards - Winter Music Conference 2016 - WMC 2016". Archived from the original on 2016-04-16.
- 2004: "31st Annual International Dance Music Awards - Winter Music Conference 2017 - WMC 2017". Archived from the original on 2016-04-16.
- 2005: "31st Annual International Dance Music Awards - Winter Music Conference 2016 - WMC 2016". Archived from the original on 2016-04-16.
- 2006: "28th Annual International Dance Music Awards - Winter Music Conference 2013 - WMC 2013". Archived from the original on 2013-06-27.
- 2007: "31st Annual International Dance Music Awards - Winter Music Conference 2016 - WMC 2016". Archived from the original on 2016-08-18.
- 2008: "31st Annual International Dance Music Awards - Winter Music Conference 2016 - WMC 2016". Archived from the original on 2016-08-21.
- 2009: "31st Annual International Dance Music Awards - Winter Music Conference 2016 - WMC 2016". Archived from the original on 2016-03-08.
- 2010: "31st Annual International Dance Music Awards - Winter Music Conference 2018 - WMC 2018". Archived from the original on 2018-09-02.
- 2011: "27th Annual International Dance Music Awards - Winter Music Conference 2012 - WMC 2012". Archived from the original on 2012-03-25.
- 2012: "27th Annual International Dance Music Awards - Winter Music Conference 2012 - WMC 2012". Archived from the original on 2012-01-29.
- 2013: "28th Annual International Dance Music Awards - Winter Music Conference 2013 - WMC 2013". Archived from the original on 2013-03-07.
- 2014: "29th Annual International Dance Music Awards - Winter Music Conference 2014 - WMC 2014". Archived from the original on 2014-03-12.
- 2015: "31st Annual International Dance Music Awards - Winter Music Conference 2017 - WMC 2017". Archived from the original on 2017-04-06.
- 2016: "31st Annual International Dance Music Awards - Winter Music Conference 2016 - WMC 2016". Archived from the original on 2016-06-30.

== 2018 ==
Nb: There was no shortlist to the 2018 awards, only winners were chosen.

Category	Nominees	Ref.
Best Male Artist (Mainstream)	(Netherlands) Armin van Buuren	
Best Female Artist (Mainstream)	(Australia) NERVO	
Best Male Artist (Underground)	(United Kingdom) Carl Cox	
Best Female Artist (Underground)	(Russia) Nina Kraviz	
Best Live Performance / Live Act	(Norway) Kygo	
Best Podcast / Radio Show	(Netherlands) Armin van Buuren - A State of Trance	
Best Breakthrough Artist	(Norway) Alan Walker	
Best Album	(United States) The Chainsmokers - Memories...Do Not Open	
Best Song	(Sweden) Axwell Λ Ingrosso - "More Than You Know"	
Best Remix	(Sweden) The Chainsmokers - "Something Just Like This" (Alesso Remix)	
Best Club (USA)	(United States) Omnia - Las Vegas	
Best Club (Global)	(Spain) Ushuaïa - Ibiza	
Best Music Event	(Netherlands) Armin van Buuren - A State of Trance	
Best Festival	(United States) Ultra Music Festival	
Best Streaming Services	(Sweden) Spotify	
Best Radio Station	(United Kingdom) BBC Radio 1	
Best Label (USA)	(United States) Ultra Music	
Best Label (Global)	(Netherlands) Armada Music	
Best Innovative DJ Product	(Japan) Pioneer DJ XDJ-RX2	
Best DJ Equipment Manufacturer	(Japan) Pioneer DJ	
Best Daw	(Belgium) FL Studio	

== 2019 ==
=== Industry categories ===
Category	Nominees	Ref.
Breakthrough Artist Of The Year	Alison Wonderland; Fisher; Loud Luxury; Peggy Gou (Netherlands) San Holo	
Best Pop/Electronic Album	(United Kingdom) Above & Beyond - Common Ground; Alison Wonderland - Awake; David Guetta - 7 Rufus Du Sol - Solace; Sofi Tukker - Treehouse	
Best Electronic Album	Against All Logic - 2012-2017; DJ Koze - Knock Knock; Jon Hopkins - Singularity; Rezz - Certain Kind Of Magic (Netherlands) San Holo - Album1	
Best Pop/Electronic Song	Feenixpawl - "Neon Sky"; Loud Luxury - "Body" (United States) Marshmello - "Happier"; Silk City & Dua Lipa - "Electricity"; Tiësto & Post Malone - "Jackie Chan"	
Best Electronic Song	Adam Beyer - "Losing My Mind"; CamelPhat & Au/Ra - "Panic Room" (Australia) Fisher - "Losing It"; DJ Koze - "Pick Up"; Peggy Gou - "It Makes You Forget"	
Best Remix	Bicep - "Opal" (Four Tet Remix); Charlie Puth - "How Long" (EDX Remix); Fatboy Slim - "Praise You" (Purple Disco Machine Remix) (United States) Halsey - "Without Me" (Illenium Remix); Lou Rawls - "You'll Never Find Another Love Like Mine" (Frankie Knuckles, Kenny Summit & Eric Kupper Remix)	
Best Label	Anjunabeats; Armada Music (Canada) Monstercat; Spinnin' Records; Ultra Music	
Best Club	Avant Gardner / Brooklyn Mirage, New York; Bootshaus, Cologne; Printworks, London; Sound, Los Angeles (United States) Space, Miami	
Best Festival	Electric Forest; Electric Daisy Carnival; Movement (Belgium) Tomorrowland; Ultra Music Festival	
Best Podcast/Radio Show	(Netherlands) Armin Van Buuren - A State Of Trance; Tiësto - Club Life; Pete Tong - BBC Radio 1 Nora En Pure - Purified; Monstercat - Call Of The Wild	
Best Radio Station	(United Kingdom) BBC Radio 1 Evolution / iHeartRadio; KNHC C89.5 Seattle; Rinse FM; SiriusXM BPM	
Best Streaming Service	Amazon Music; Apple Music; Pandora; SoundCloud (Sweden) Spotify	
Best YouTube Channel	Majestic Casual; Monstercat; Mr. Suicide Sheep; Proximity (Netherlands) Spinnin TV	
Best DJ Equipment Manufacturer	Allen & Heath; Denon; Native Instruments (Japan) Pioneer DJ; Technics	
Best DAW	Ableton Live 10 (Belgium) FL Studio; Logic Pro; Pro Tools; Steinberg Cubase	

=== Artist categories ===
Category	Nominees	Ref.
Best Male Artist (Pop/Electronic)	Alok; DJ Snake; Marshmello (Netherlands) Martin Garrix; The Chainsmokers	
Best Female Artist (Pop/Electronic)	Grimes; Juicy M Krewella (Australia) NERVO; Tigerlily	
Best Male Artist (Techno)	Adam Beyer; Boris Brejcha (United Kingdom) Carl Cox; Richie Hawtin; Stephan Bodzin	
Best Female Artist (Techno)	Amelie Lens (Belgium) Charlotte de Witte; Deborah de Luca; Monika Kruse; Nina Kraviz	
Best Male Artist (House)	Claptone (United Kingdom) Disclosure; Duke Dumont; Kungs; Vintage Culture	
Best Female Artist (House)	Honey Dijon; Maya Jane Coles (South Africa) (Switzerland) Nora En Pure; Peggy Gou; The Black Madonna	
Best Male Artist (Bass)	Baauer (United States) Illenium; Louis The Child; RL Grime; San Holo	
Best Female Artist (Bass)	(Australia) Alison Wonderland; Alluxe; Huxley Anne; Lady Bee; REZZ	
Best Male Artist (Trance)	Above & Beyond (Netherlands) Armin van Buuren; Gareth Emery; Markus Schulz; Paul Van Dyk	
Best Female Artist (Trance)	(United Kingdom) Christina Novelli; Maria Healy; Nathia Kate; Nifra; Orla Feeney	
Best Male Artist (Drum n’ Bass)	Andy C Chase & Status (United Kingdom) Delta Heavy; Hybrid Minds; Noisia	
Best Female Artist (Drum n’ Bass)	DJ Rap (United Kingdom) DJ Storm; Djinn; Kyrist; Mollie Collins	
Best Male Artist (Downtempo)	Bonobo; Emancipator; Kaytranada (France) Petit Biscuit; Thievery Corporation	
Best Female Artist (Downtempo)	Emika; Kaitlyn Aurelia Smith; Lil Bo Weep; Sister Bliss (United States) TOKiMONSTA	
Best Male Artist (Hardstyle)	Angerfist; Brennan Heart; Coone (Netherlands) Headhunterz; Wildstylez	
Best Female Artist (Hardstyle)	AniMe; DJ Stephanie; Korsakoff; Lady Faith (Ukraine) Miss K8	

== 2020 ==
=== Industry categories ===
Category	Nominees	Ref.
Best Album	(Sweden) Avicii - TIM; Flume - Hi This is Flume; Gryffin - Gravity; Illenium - ASCEND; The Chemical Brothers - No Geography	
Best Song (Dance)	(Italy) Meduza - "Piece of Your Heart"; Sam Feldt featuring RANI - "Post Malone"; Yves V featuring Afrojack & Icona Pop - "We Got That Cool"; Oliver Heldens, Lenno - "This Groove"; LUM!X and Gabry Ponte - "Monster"	
Best Song (Electronic)	Bonobo - "Linked"; CamelPhat featuring Jem Cooke - "Rabbit Hole"; Elderbrook and Rudimental - "Something About You" (Australia) Fisher - "You Little Beauty"; Peggy Gou - "Starry Night"	
Best Remix	Monolink – Return To Oz (ARTBAT Remix) (Brazil) Meduza, Goodboys – Piece of Your Heart (Alok Remix); LUM!X, Gabry Ponte – Monster (Robin Schulz Remix); UK Apache & SHY FX – Original Nuttah 25 featuring IRAH (Chase & Status Remix); Madonna – I Rise (Tracy Young Remix)	
Best Label	Armada Music; Anjunabeats; Astralwerks (Netherlands) Spinnin' Records; Ultra Records	
Breakthrough Artist	ARTBAT; Dom Dolla (Italy) Meduza; Solardo; WHIPPED CREAM	
Best Festival/Event	Coachella; Electric Daisy Carnival; Electric Zoo (Belgium) Tomorrowland; Ultra Music Festival	
Best Club	Avant Gardner/Brooklyn Mirage (New York); Berghain (Berlin); Fabric Nightclub (London); Space (Miami) (Spain) Ushuaïa (Ibiza)	
Best Radio Show/Podcast	(Netherlands) A State of Trance by Armin van Buuren; Club Life by Tiësto; Group Therapy by Above & Beyond; Heldeep Radio by Oliver Heldens; Spinnin’ Sessions	
Best Radio Station	(United Kingdom) BBC Radio 1 BPM (SiriusXM); Diplo's Revolution (SiriusXM); Evolution (iHeartRadio); KCRW (LA)	
Best Streaming Service	Amazon Music; Apple Music; Deezer; Pandora (Sweden) Spotify	
Best YouTube Channel	MrSuicideSheep; Proximity (Netherlands) Spinnin’ TV; Trap Nation; Ultra Music	
Best DJ Equipment Manufacturer	Allen & Heath; Denon DJ; Native Instruments (Japan) Pioneer DJ; Technics	
Best DAW	Ableton Live 10; Avid Pro Tools (Belgium) FL Studio; Logic Pro X Steinberg Cubase	

=== Artist categories ===
Category	Nominees	Ref.
Dance/Electronic (Male)	Calvin Harris (Belgium) Dimitri Vegas & Like Mike; Marshmello; Martin Garrix; The Chainsmokers	
Dance/Electronic (Female)	Juicy M Krewella; Mariana BO; MATTN (Australia) NERVO	
Techno (Male)	Adam Beyer; Boris Brejcha (United Kingdom) Carl Cox; Enrico Sangiuliano; Richie Hawtin	
Techno (Female)	Amelie Lens; ANNA (Belgium) Charlotte de Witte; Deborah de Luca; Nina Kraviz	
Trance (Male)	Above & Beyond; Aly & Fila (Netherlands) Armin van Buuren; Giuseppe Ottaviani; Cosmic Gate	
Trance (Female)	Alessandra Roncone (United Kingdom) Christina Novelli; Clara Yates; Maria Healy; Nifra	
House (Male)	ARTBAT; Black Coffee; Claptone (Australia) FISHER; Meduza	
House (Female)	Hannah Wants; Honey Dijon; Maya Jane Coles (South Africa) (Switzerland) Nora En Pure; Peggy Gou	
Bass (Male)	Illenium; NGHTMRE; RL Grime (United States) Skrillex; Yellow Claw	
Bass (Female)	(Australia) Alison Wonderland; CloZee; Lucii; REZZ; WHIPPED CREAM	
Drum & Bass (Male)	Andy C Bou (United Kingdom) Chase & Status; Enei; Sub Focus	
Drum & Bass (Female)	Changing Faces; DJ Rap (United Kingdom) DJ Storm; Kyrist; Mollie Collins	
Hardstyle (Male)	Angerfist; D-Block & S-te-Fan; Da Tweekaz (Netherlands) Headhunterz; Warface	
Hardstyle (Female)	AniMe; Korsakoff; Lady Dammage (Belgium) MANDY; Miss K8	
Downtempo (Male)	Bonobo; Four Tet (France) Petit Biscuit; Thievery Corporation; Tycho	
Downtempo (Female)	Huxley Anne; D. Tiffany; Roza Terenzi (Belgium) TOKiMONSTA; Yu Su	

== 2026 ==
International Dance Music Awards returned in 2026 after a six-year hiatus. The nominations were announced on March 13, 2026. The winners were announced during the Winter Music Conference on March 26, 2026.

=== Industry categories ===
Artist of the Year	Breakthrough Artist of the Year
Fred again..; Chris Lake; John Summit; Mau P; Sara Landry	Kettama; Chloé Caillet; Jackie Hollander; Josh Baker; Ki/Ki
Best Album	Best Remix
Chemistry – Chris Lake; Charlotte de Witte – Charlotte de Witte; Fuck U Skrillex You Think Ur Andy Warhol but Ur Not!! – Skrillex; I Love My Computer – Ninajirachi; Same Day Cleaning – Sammy Virji	"Galvanize (Chris Lake Extended Mix)" – The Chemical Brothers; "I'm Not Alone (MPH Remix)" – Calvin Harris; "The Days (Notion Remix)" – Chrystal; "Stephanie (HNTR Remix)" – Cloonee, Young M.A, and InntRaw; "Walking on a Dream (Blond:ish Remix)" – Empire of the Sun
Best Song (Dance)	Best Song (Electronic)
"No Broke Boys" – Disco Lines and Tinashe; "Hypnotized" – Anyma and Ellie Goulding; "I Guess We're Not the Same" – Sammy Virji; "In My Head" – Chris Lake and Amber Mark; "Victory Lap" – Fred again.., Skepta, and PlaqueBoyMax	"Like I Like It" – Mau P; "About to Begin" – Barry Can't Swim; "All Systems Are Lying" – Soulwax; "Into Dust" – Four Tet; "One Mind" – Amelie Lens and Charlotte de Witte; "Voltage" – Skrillex
Best Label	Best Festival/Event
Experts Only; Anjunabeats; Black Book; Defected Records; Drumcode Records; Insomniac Records; Toolroom Records	Coachella (United States); Burning Man (United States); Creamfields (United Kingdom); Dekmantel (Netherlands); Electric Daisy Carnival (United States); Tomorrowland (Belgium); Ultra Music Festival (United States)
Best Club	Best Event Series
Space (Miami); Amnesia (Ibiza); Drumsheds (London); Echostage (Washington, D.C.); Hï (Ibiza); UNVRS (Ibiza); Ushuaïa (Ibiza)	Circoloco; Breakaway; Defected; Elrow; Experts Only; Music On; RESISTANCE
Best Radio Show/Podcast	Best Music Media Resource
BBC Radio 1 Essential Mix; A State of Trance – Armin van Buuren; CLUBLIFE – Tiësto; Drumcode Radio Live – Adam Beyer; Group Therapy Radio – Above & Beyond; Heldeep Radio – Oliver Heldens; Toolroom Radio	1001Tracklists; Beatportal; Billboard Dance; DJ Lovers Club; DJ Mag; Mixmag; Resident Advisor

=== Artist categories ===
Dance Artist of the Year	Techno Artist of the Year
John Summit; Chris Lake; Dom Dolla; Mau P; Oliver Heldens	Sara Landry; Amelie Lens; Charlotte de Witte; Eli Brown; Indira Paganotto
House Artist of the Year	Melodic House/Techno Artist of the Year
Chloé Caillet; Franky Rizardo; Hot Since 82; Jonas Blue; Max Dean	Rüfüs Du Sol; Anyma; Cassian; Layton Giordani; Miss Monique
Progressive House Artist of the Year	Tech House Artist of the Year
Eric Prydz; Christoph; John Digweed; Sasha; Sébastien Léger; Yotto	Max Styler; Josh Baker; Odd Mob; PAWSA; Prospa
Afro House Artist of the Year	Trance Artist of the Year
Hugel; Adam Port; Alex Wann; Rampa; Vanco	Marlon Hoffstadt; Above & Beyond; Armin van Buuren; Ferry Corsten; Markus Schulz
Bass Artist of the Year	Drum & Bass Artist of the Year
Illenium; Excision; GRiZ; Subtronics; Sullivan King; Zeds Dead	Chase & Status; Andy C; Dimension; Hedex; Sub Focus

== See also ==
- DJ Awards
- Miami Music Week
- Ultra Music Festival
- Winter Music Conference
