= Ruhr in Love =

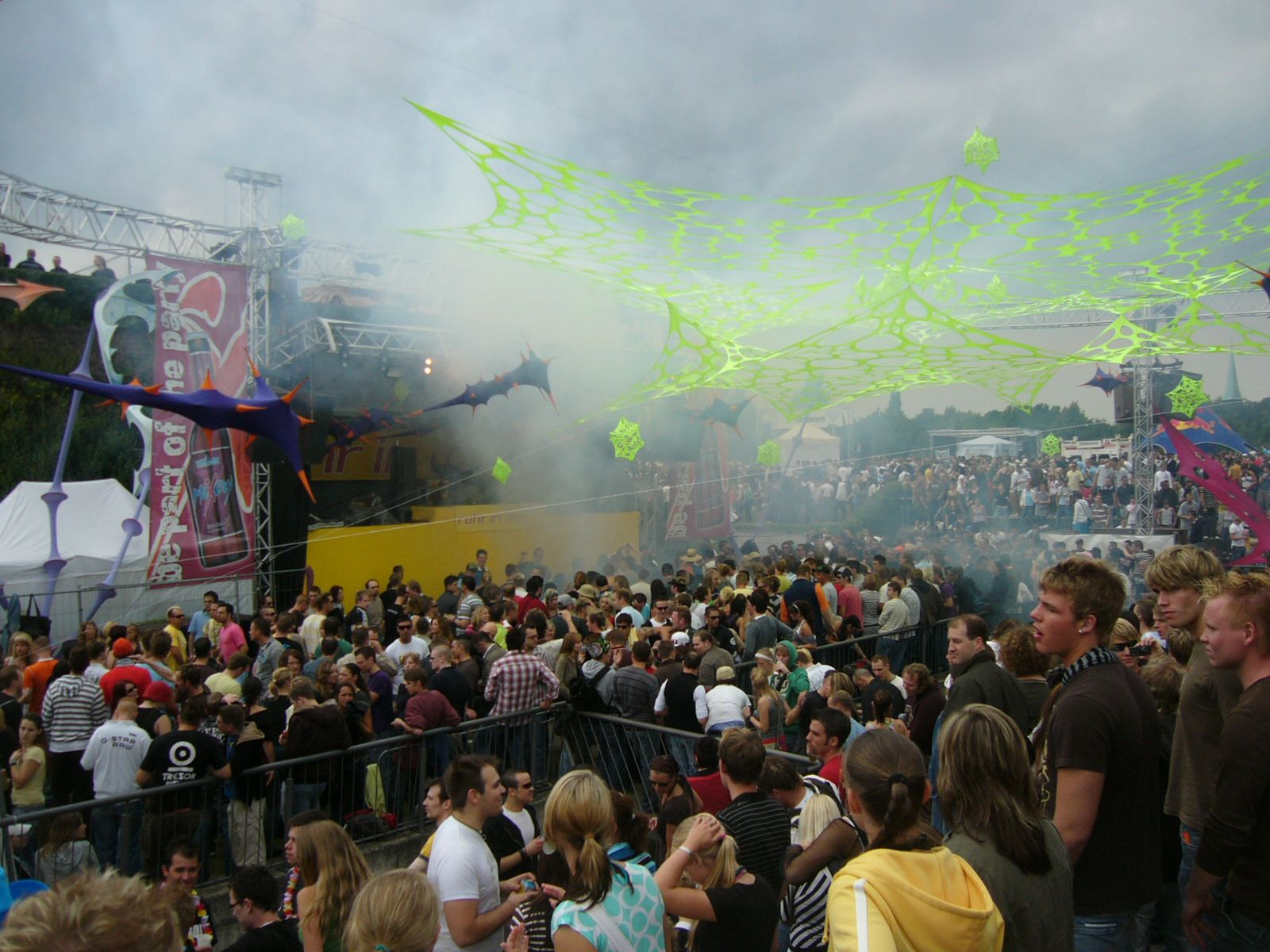
- Ruhr in Love 2007
- Genre: Electronic music
- Dates: June
- Location: Oberhausen, Germany
- Years active: 2003-present
- Founders: I-Motion GmbH
- Attendance: 46,000+
- Website: Official site

Ruhr in Love or Ruhr-in-Love is an annual family festival of the electronic music scene in Oberhausen, Germany, where it has been held since June 2003. It is a one-day open-air festival at which more than 35 "colourful and imaginatively designed floors" are presented by clubs, event organisers, record labels, booking agencies, radio stations, magazines etc. The focal point is the Mixery-Stage featuring international headliners.

The festival is put on by I-Motion GmbH, now a part of SFX Entertainment. Every kind of electronic music is represented. There is an official indoor after-party called Mega-Love Invasion. The 2014 event drew 46,000 people despite rain; there were a record 400 DJs.

Since 2003 Ruhr-in-Love is supported by eve&rave Münster e.V. with drug-information-desks.

== Years ==
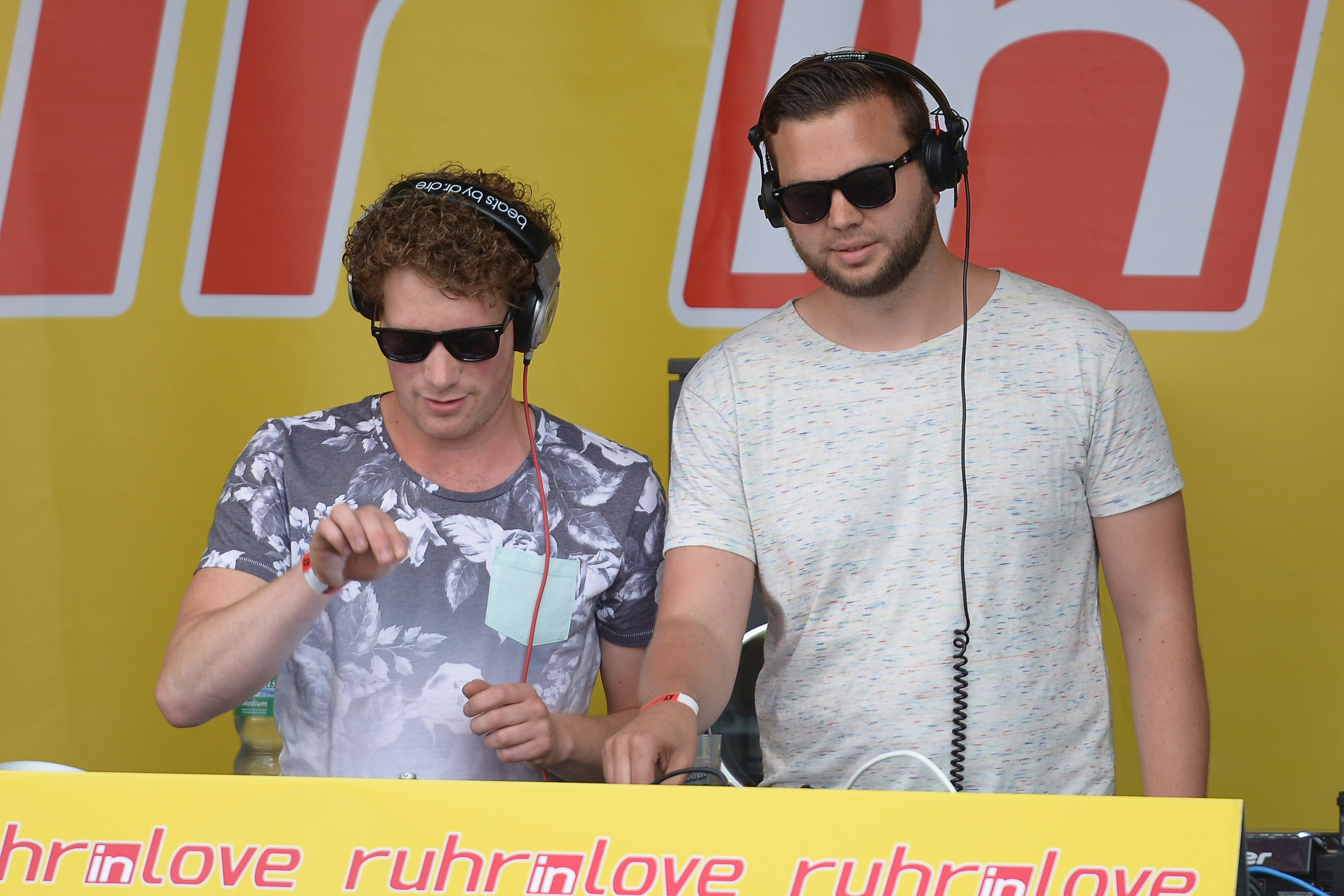
East & Young 2015

Dates	DJs of the Mainfloors	Artists	Attendees
28 June 2003	DJ Tomcraft, Tom Novy, Adam Beyer, Afrika Islam, DJ Hooligan	Nordsternpark Gelsenkirchen; 169 DJs and live acts	17,000
26 June 2004	Chris Liebing, The Advent, Adam Beyer, DJ Tomcraft, Tom Novy, Moguai, Marc Vision	Umzug in den Olga-Park Oberhausen; 229 DJs and live acts	20,000
25 June 2005	Chris Liebing, Michael Paul, Phil Fuldner, Moguai, Hardfloor, Dave Clarke	292 DJs and live acts	20,000
24 June 2006	Chris Liebing, Bad Boy Bill, Tom Novy, Anthony Rother, Martin Heyder, Frank Sonic	300 DJs and live acts	23,000
30 June 2007	Chris Liebing, Ante Perry, Felix Kröcher, Moguai, Anthony Rother, Dave Seaman	300 DJs and live acts	26,000
28, June 2008	Chris Liebing, Rank1, Joel Mull, Felix Kröcher, Moonbootica, Phil Fuldner, Martin Heyder	300 DJs and live acts	29,000
27 June 2009	Chris Liebing, Simon Patterson, Moguai, Tom Novy, Felix Kröcher, Kollektiv Turmstrasse, Andre Hommen	300 DJs and live acts	41,000
26 Juni 2010	Falko Niestolik, Erman Erim, Menno de Jong, Tocadisco, Tom Novy, Felix Kröcher, Sven Wittekind	300 DJs and live acts	40,000
25 Juni 2011	Woody van Eyden, Einmusik, Turntablerocker, Tube & Berger, Marco V, Cyberpunkers, Felix Kröcher	300 DJs and live acts	40,000
30 June 2012 "Das Zehnte Fest"	Len Faki, Dennis Sheperd, Ian Carey, Klaudia Gawlas, Tom Novy, Moguai, Laserkraft 3D	300 DJs and live acts	44,000
29 June 2013	Klaudia Gawlas, ATB, Phil Fuldner, Ante Perry, Moguai, Felix Kröcher, Oliver Schories, Stefan Dabruck		46,000
5 July 2014	2Elements, Robin Schulz, AKA AKA feat. Thalstroem, Danny Avila, DBN, Klaudia Gawlas, TorstenKanzler	400 DJs and live acts	46,000
27 June 2015	East & Young, DBN, AKA AKA feat. Thalstroem, Oliver Heldens, Gestört aber GeiL, Felix Kröcher, Klaudia Gawlas	400 DJs and live acts	48,000

== See also ==
- List of electronic music festivals
