= Joseph Capriati =

Italian electronic music producer and DJ

- Capriati in 2023

Background information
- Born: Giuseppe Capriati; July 25, 1987 (age 39); Caserta, Campania, Italy
- Genres: Techno, House
- Occupations: DJ, Record producer
- Years active: 2006–present
- Label: Redimension Music

Joseph Capriati, born as Giuseppe Capriati (born 25 July 1987 in Caserta, Italy) is an Italian DJ and music producer.

== Musical career ==
Joseph Capriati started Djing in 1998 at the age of 11 in his hometown of Caserta. Years later, he began performing regularly as a DJ resident at Disco Seven Club under the artistic name "Prince J". His debut as a professional DJ/Producer was in 2007 with his first record "Formaldehyde EP" Released on Sasha Carassi's Label Globox Recordings

In his early years, Joseph Capriati was mentored by Rino Cerrone and Markantonio, with whom he also collaborated on many productions and international gigs, performing alongside them, often under a DJ trio project called Neapolitan Gangsta.

Following his international debut, he established himself as a producer, releasing early tracks and a debut LP on labels like Drumcode, CLR and Analytic Trail. He performed at Berghain in Berlin, Awakenings in Amsterdam, and Fabric in London.

In 2009, Joseph Caprati debuted on Adam Beyer’s label "Drumcode Records" with two EPs, "Sidechains/Kontrol Room" and "Iron Pump/Black Line”. From that point on, Joseph Capriati became a regular artist at Drumcode shows In 2009, he released the "Login EP" under Chris Liebing's label, CLR.

Capriati released then his first album under the name Save My Soul in July 2010 with Analytic Trail.

Since 2011, Joseph Capriati has been a regular performer at the Monegros Festival, playing at the event, and in July 2024, he is slated to close the festival.

In March 2012, Capriati released an EP called Congenial Endeavor in collaboration with Adam Beyer which was released on Beyer's label.

In November 2013, Capriati released his second album Self Portrait, on Drumcode This album was described as a 'beautifully melodic dance-floor body of work' by DJ Mag. In relation to this album, a documentary called 'Autoritratto' was made, which was recorded in Caserta, his hometown, in February 2013. In 2015, Joseph released an LP named Fabric 80.

In 2016, Capriati announced the launch of his own label, Redimension. On the 20th of June of that same year, he released two tracks - "Parallels" and "External Links" - in collaboration with Beyer. In September 2016, Capriati presented an all-night-long solo performance, 100% JC, at Input Club in Barcelona.

Almost a year later, in March 2017, he released a second project "Prospective Journeys", in collaboration with Flavio Folco.

In November 2017, Joseph Capriati played a 25-and-a-half-hour set at Heart Club Miami. It was the longest performance of his life. In April 2019, he broke his record with a more than 27-hour set at Sunwaves festival in Romania. He has been staple at the Sunwaves festival, as well as Timewarp in Mannheim since 2016 where he has closed stage 1 in the last few years.

In 2019, Joseph Capriati participated in his mentor's event, Pure Carl Cox at Privilege Ibiza.

On September 4, 2020, the Neapolitan artist published his third album, Metamorfosi.

In May 2022, Joseph Capriati collaborated with UNICEF for a fundraising event called ‘Joseph Capriati and Friends‘, with the aim of contributing to help over 7 million children affected by the Russian invasion of Ukraine. The event was hosted at the Diego Armando Maradona Stadium in Naples, Italy.

During the summer of 2022, he hosted the series of events "Metamorfosi", a concert event led by Joseph Capriati that features mix of techno, house, and melodic DJ sets. "Metamorfosi" concert events are based on the eponymous album at the legendary Ibiza's club Amnesia on Fridays, July 22, August 5, and August 19. Launched in 2022 by DJ Joseph Capriati, Metamorfosi is a brand and event series showcasing his vision of clubbing culture. Based on his 2020 album, it aims to move away from fixed genres and traditional standards, focusing on innovation within nightlife culture.

In February 2023, Joseph Capriati held his Metamorfosi party with Archie Hamilton and Fleur Shore at Outernet in London, and the event was completely sold out.

In the summer of 2023, Joseph Capriati returned to Amnesia for a second residency The Metamorfosi party, led by Joseph and started on July 21, featuring a big lineup including the most important DJs and live acts in the world until August 18.

In 2024, Metamorfosi started with a sold-out event in London, its only UK appearance, and continue with global showcases. In the 2024 season, Joseph Capriati also delivered a series of concerts on the Ibiza music season. He was joined by Paul Kalkbrenner, Who Made Who, Jamie Jones, Anotr, Seth Troxler, Chris Stussy, Indira Paganotto, Sara Landry, and more. In 2025, Joseph Capriati plans to expand his Metamorfosi events to new territories.

== Discography ==
=== LPs ===
- 2010 – Save My Soul - Analytic Trail
- 2013 – Self Portrait - Drumcode
- 2020 – Metamorfosi - Redimension Music
- 2022 – Metamorfosi The Remix Collection - Redimension Music

=== EPs ===
- 2007 – Formaldehyde EP (feat. Sasha Carassi) - Globox
- 2007 - Teoria Della Fissione EP (feat. Sasha Carassi) - Capsula
- 2007 – Flip Da Box EP – Globox
- 2007 – Loving My Parents EP: Sirgardino – Vito (Joseph Capriati RMX) – Subtronic
- 2007 – Weekend EP – Minibus
- 2007 – C’est la Vie EP – Analytic Trail
- 2007 – Elastico (feat. Sasha Carassi) – Tracks 4 Djs
- 2007 – Colander EP - Tracks 4 Djs
- 2008 – Russian EP: Tessa N Calveri – Russian – (Joseph Capriati RMX) – Cromate Recordings
- 2008 – Giallo Canarino (feat. Matteo Spedicati) – CMYK Music
- 2008 – At Last EP (feat. Abnormal Boyz) - Split Sound Records
- 2008 – Luca Albano - Subruban (Joseph Capriati RMX) - Stereo Seven Productions
- 2008 – Orange EP (feat. Rino Cerrone) - Loose Records
- 2008 – Round Zero (feat. Markantonio) - MKT Rec
- 2008 – Things that work EP - Agile Recordings
- 2008 – Farlocco EP - Frankie Records
- 2008 – Unrilis002 (feat. Rino Cerrone) - Unrilis
- 2008 – Molotov EP (feat. Markantonio) - Analytic Train
- 2009 – Codice Morse EP (feat. Markantonio) - Alchemy
- 2008 – Koala: Koala (Joseph Capriati Mix) - MB Elektronics
- 2008 – Stealth EP: Simone Tavazzi - Stealth (Joseph Capriati RMX) - Syndikaat Records
- 2008 – Best Of 2008 – Minimal Edition: Russian (Joseph Capriati RMX) - Gastspiel Records
- 2008 – Rilis Remixes Series Vol.4: Rino Cerrone - Burn it (Joseph Capriati RMX) - Unrilis
- 2008 – Mixed Bag EP: Joaquin Drama - Baglama (Joseph Capriati RMX) - Frankie Records
- 2009 – Login EP 1.0 – CLR
- 2009 – Login EP 2.0 – CLR
- 2009 – Angels over Naples EP: Roboters (Original Mix) - Sci + Tech
- 2010 – Gashouder EP - Drumcode
- 2009 – Iron Pump / Black Line - Drumcode
- 2009 – Incest (feat. Matteo Spedicati) - Alchemy
- 2009 – Galaxy Espress / Old River - Drumcode
- 2010 – Gashouder - Drumcode
- 2010 – The Gallery - Drumcode
- 2011 - Missed Flight (feat. Cari Lekebusch) - Drumcode
- 2011 - The Napoli Connection (incl. Rino Cerrone & Markantonio) - Drumcode
- 2012 – A-Sides (incl. Alan Fitzpatrick) - Drumcode
- 2012 – Congenial Endeavor (feat. Adam Beyer) - Drumcode
- 2013 – Awake / Fratello - Drumcode
- 2016 – Redimension 001 (feat. Adam Beyer) - Redimension
- 2017 – Prospective Journeys (feat. Flavio Folco) - Redimension
- 2020 – New Horizons (feat. James Senese) - Redimension
- 2024 – Peace & Blessings (feat. Arnold Jarvis) - Nervous Records
- 2024 – Mantra EP (with Indira Paganotto)

=== DJ Mixes ===
- 2015 – Fabric 80: Joseph Capriati - Fabric
- 2017 – RA.563 – Resident Advisor, Podcast
