= Joel Mull =

Swedish techno music producer and DJ

- Also known as: Damm, Icarus, Gotzkowsky, The Descent
- Born: Joel David Mull; 9 February 1975 (age 51); Stockholm, Sweden
- Genre: Techno
- Occupations: Turntablism, record producer
- Years active: 1993–present
- Labels: Drumcode Records; Parabel; Solarplexus

Joel Mull (born 9 February 1975 in Stockholm, Sweden) is a Swedish electronic dance music producer and DJ.

Before beginning his career as a DJ in the early 1990s, Mull studied classical music and participated in choir ensembles. In 1994, he moved to Germany and subsequently served as a resident DJ at Unit Club in Hamburg from 1995 to 1998.

Mull emerged in the mid-1990s as part of a cohort of Swedish techno artists that included Cari Lekebusch, Jesper Dahlbäck, and Adam Beyer. Mull co-founded the label Parabel. He has also released across multiple different labels, such as Adam Beyer's label Drumcode Records. Mull released the EP Retrospectives, featuring artwork designed by Supervizion.

Mull has performed as a DJ at various venues, including Berghain and Tresor in Berlin.

== Discography ==
As an artist, Mull has released several albums and a number of EPs, while also working as a music producer and remixer.

=== Studio albums ===
- Imagination (2000)
- The Observer (2007)
- Sensory (2011)
- RA.EX066 Joel Mull (2011)
- Parabel (2015)
- Firefly (2017)
- Here We Are (2017)
- Arrow of Time (2019)

=== EPs, mixes and singles ===
- Stompdust Corp. (1996)
- Retrospectives (1998)
- Constant Process (2004)
- Pale Reich, (2015)
- Groover (2021)
- Recalibration EP (2023)
- Participation (2024)
- CTRL050 (2024)

=== Collaborations ===
- Vesperum Winds, (2018) (with Dustin Zahn)
- Slight Munch (2021) (with Heiko Laux)
- We Don't Know Anything Yet (2021) (Alan Fitzpatrick and Joel Muel featuring Frangie)

=== DJ mixes ===
- Gerrett Frerichs & Joel Mull - Unit (Mix tape, 1995, Unit Club in Hamburg)
- Joel Mull DJ Set @ Berghain 4th Nov 2012 (Last two hours of set from Berghain in Berlin, Germany)
