= Tranzit =

Tranzit may refer to:

- FC Tranzit, a football club in Latvia
- In Tranzit, original title of the 2008 Russian-British film In Transit
- Tranzit Group, a bus operator in New Zealand
- TranZit, a map of zombies in Call of Duty: Black Ops II
- a bar at the No Sleep Festival in Serbia
