= Ciel (musician) =

Canadian DJ and record producer

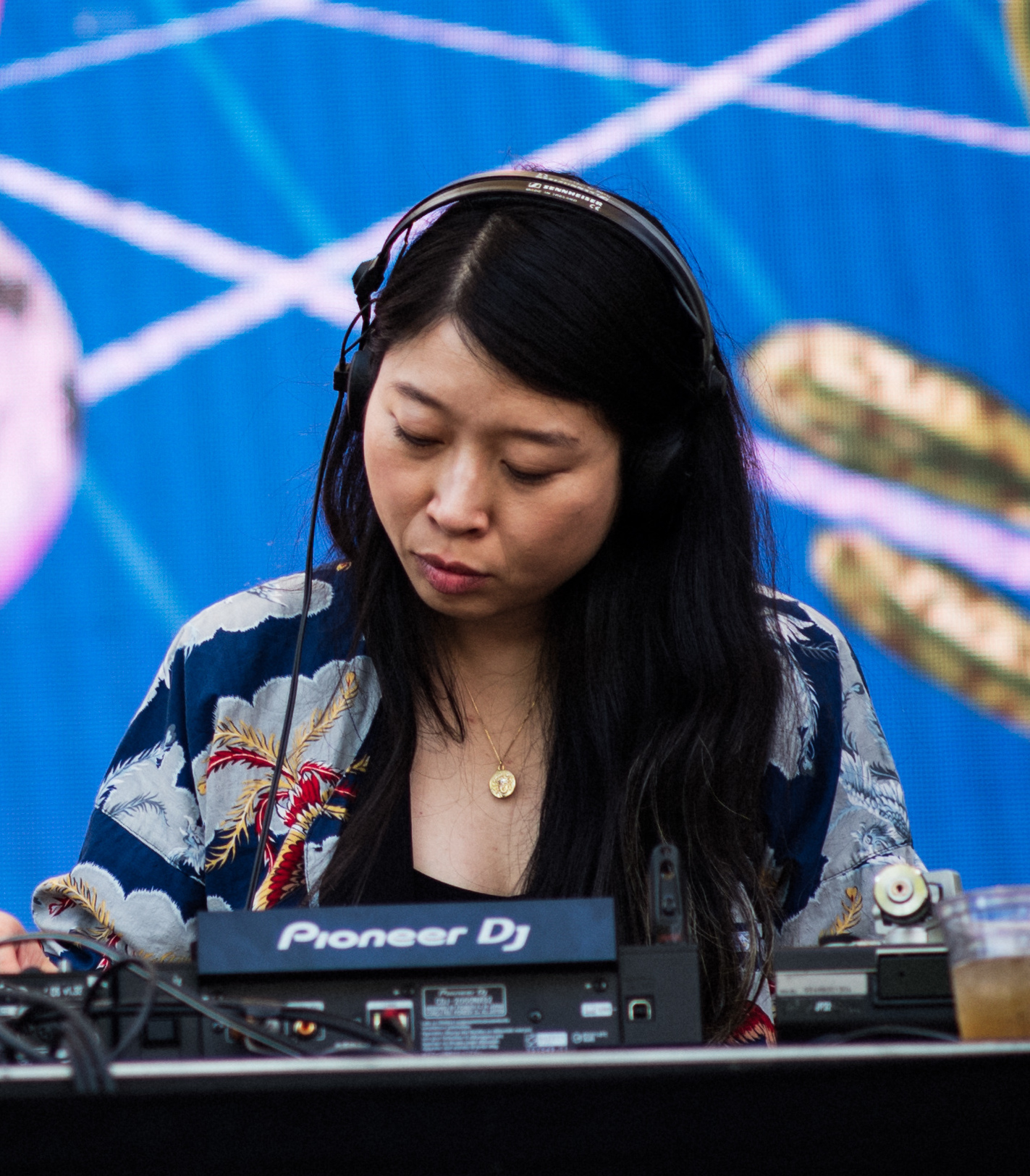
- Ciel performing in Detroit in 2019

Background information
- Born: Cindy Li; Xi'an, China
- Origin: Toronto, Ontario, Canada
- Genres: Electronic; Dance; House
- Labels: Parallel Minds, X Kalay, IK7, Planet Euphorique, Ecstatic Editions

Cindy Li, known professionally as Ciel, is a Canadian DJ, producer, and promoter. Based in Toronto, Ontario, Li is known for her solo and collaborative electronic EPs and for founding the label Parallel Minds. Li is also known for her advocacy work for women in the electronic music scene in Toronto. Li was born in Xi'an.

== Career ==
Li studied English at Queen's University. Her career started as the radio host of CFRC-FM, a station in Kingston, Ontario, where she emphasized music from women-identifying artists. There, Li developed an interest in post-punk and shoegaze music. In 2015, Li developed Work in Progress, an event designed as an extension of her radio show and exclusively showcasing music by women-identifying artists. Guests at the shows included D. Tiffany, Volvox, and DJBOYZCLUB. The event was designed to push back against all-male DJ lineups and improve the safety of the spaces where performances take place.

Her debut EP, Electrical Encounters, was released in 2017 to positive critical reviews. In 2018, her mix "Radio Buttons #20" was described as one of the best of January by Pitchfork with acclaim for its atmosphere and pacing. Her second EP, Hundred Flowers, was similarly acclaimed as one of the best electronic records of the year. In 2020 and 2021, Li released collaborative EPs with fellow Canadian producers D. Tiffany and Dan Only as Psychedelic Budz and Cloudsteppers.

== Style ==
Her work has been described as fast-paced, with an emphasis on percussive sampling, lead synths, and bass tonality. She works broadly within electronic and dance music.

== Discography ==
=== Albums and EPs ===
- Electrical Encounters (2017)
- Hundred Flowers (2018)
- Why Me? (2019)
- Trojan Horse [Thanks for Enlightening Me] (2020)
- All We Have is Each Other (2021)
