= Supervision (disambiguation) =

Supervision is the act or instance of directing, managing, or oversight.

Supervision may refer to:

- Abusive supervision
- Clinical supervision, the system whereby therapists are expected to arrange to meet another therapist for their own benefit or to discuss their work
- Supervision (telephony), a type of signaling in telephony for answering and disconnecting telephone calls
- Watara Supervision (also known as Quickshot Supervision in the UK), a video game system
- Supervision (character), (formerly known as Scrap), a female superhero and member of Dynamo 5
- SuperVision (band), the works of Richard Blake Hansen released under the Pretty Lights record label.
- Supervision (album), a synth-pop record released by English artist La Roux in February 2020.

== See also ==
- Management
- Supervisor, one who oversees the work or tasks of another
- Supervizion, a professional services company
