= Eve & Rave =

German nonprofit organizations

Eve & Rave (also known as eve&rave) are/were non-profit registered associations in the German cities Berlin, Kassel, Cologne and Münster as well as in Switzerland. The name of these associations is a composition of the words "eve" like some sort of ecstasy-pills and "rave" like the correspondent electronic music events.

The objectives of Eve & Rave were advancements in party- and techno-culture and the harm reduction of using drugs. Therefore, Eve & Rave offers information about low-risk use of legal and illegalized drugs. Eve & Rave advocates for the decriminalization of drug users, drug maturity and drug checking, which today is supported by a lot of criminal lawyers, parts of the police, notable economists and a growing number of people.

== History ==
The roots of the eve&rave-idea are located in Berlin. At 12 October 1994 the registered association Eve & Rave e.V. Berlin was founded. The objectives of Eve & Rave were advancements in party- and techno-culture to improve night life and make it more safe (Safer House and Safer Clubbing). Amongst others, a major objective was the harm reduction of using drugs. In 1996 the idea spread to the cities Münster (Germany) and Solothurn (Switzerland) and so the registered association Eve & Rave (Schweiz) and the project Eve & Rave Münster, which in 2003 became a registered association (eve&rave Münster e.V.), were founded. Additionally, the associations Eve & Rave e.V. NRW (Cologne/NRW) and later Eve & Rave Kassel were founded. In comparison to the associations in Berlin, Münster and Switzerland, the associations in Cologne and Kassel persist only a short time. From the beginning all Eve & Rave associations worked in a drug accepting manner. The use of drugs was admitted as a social reality and the abstinence paradigm (the general condemnation of people using illegalized drugs) was classified as out of touch with reality. Therefore, in the year 2000 a team of authors called techno-netzwerk berlin developed the Drug-Checking-Konzept für die Bundesrepublik Deutschland (Concept of Drug Checking for the Federal Republic of Germany) addressed to the German Bundesministerium für Gesundheit (Federal Ministry of Health), co-authored to a large degree by Eve & Rave Berlin. After Eve & Rave Berlin, NRW and Kassel had stopped their activities, only Eve & Rave Münster and Eve & Rave (Schweiz) remained active.

== Eve & Rave Berlin ==
Eve & Rave e.V. Berlin (eve&rave Berlin) was founded at 12 October 1994 and persisted until 21 March 2011. From February 1995 to September 1996, Eve & Rave Berlin organized "drug-checking-desks" at techno parties, where people could check the mixture and the amount of active ingredients of their drugs. Eve & Rave Berlin published several booklets and flyers, and had a web page (www.eve-rave.net).

== Eve & Rave Kassel ==
Eve & Rave Kassel (eve&rave Kassel) and its homepage (www.eve-rave-kassel.de and www.eve-rave.org) persisted only a short time. Because of loss of members, the activities were stopped in November 2003. Since May 2015 the former internet domain of Eve & Rave Kassel eve-rave.org is now used by Eve & Rave Münster.

== Eve & Rave Münster ==
Eve & Rave Münster (eve&rave Münster) was founded in 1996 as a project of the AIDS-Hilfe Münster e.V. (AIDS Federation Münster), taking a leaf out of Eve & Rave Berlin’s book. Since 5 June 2003 Eve & Rave Münster is a non-profit registered association (eve&rave Münster e.V.). From the beginning there was a close cooperation between Eve & Rave Münster and the governmental authorities of the City of Münster. Eve & Rave Münster’s focus of work was/is the club scene of Greater Münster (Cosmic Club, Club Depot, Dockland, Fusion Club, etc.) and lectures for teachers, scholars, students and parents. Soon the association expands its activities beyond the borders of Münster. Amongst others, Eve & Rave Münster is supporting the major techno events Mayday since 1998, Nature One since 2002, Ruhr-in-Love since 2003, Syndicate since 2013 and RadioNation and Toxicator since 2015 with drug-information-desks. Since 2001 Eve & Rave Münster has a consultant function for the German Bundeszentrale für gesundheitliche Aufklärung (BZgA) (Federal Centre for Health Education) and later the Bundesministerium für Gesundheit (BMG) (Federal Ministry of Health). From 2003 to 2006 Eve & Rave Münster was member of the Arbeitskreis Healthy Nightlife (Working Committee Healthy Night Life) created by the BZgA. This committee was planning the German Weltdrogentag 2004 (Day against Drug Abuse 2004), in which Eve & Rave Münster was significantly involved. In addition, this committee was creating the Leitfaden "Nachts Leben" – Gesundheitsförderliche Maßnahmen im Nachtleben (Guide "Living at Night" – Beneficial Arrangements for Health in Night Life), which is available as print- and PDF-version since September 2005. Since 2011 Eve & Rave Münster offers lectures in driving schools and was founder member of the community of interest PEER-Projekt an Fahrschulen (PPF) (PEER-Project at driving schools) in April 2014. Because of the increasing abuse of cognitive doping drugs by scholars, students and the working world, Eve & Rave Münster expands its service to the topic neuro-enhancement in 2014.

For organisational reasons, Eve & rave Münster shifted its homepage to a new internet domain (from www.eve-rave.de to www.eve-rave.org) at 17 May 2015.

== Eve & Rave NRW ==
Eve & Rave e.V. NRW (eve&rave NRW) based in Cologne/NRW stopped its activities after several years of work.

== Eve & Rave Schweiz ==
Eve & Rave (Schweiz) was founded in February 1996 in Solothurn (Switzerland), taking a leaf out of Eve & Rave Berlin’s book. From the beginning the association advocates for the permanent drug checking in Switzerland. Since 1999 the association provides a homepage (www.eve-rave.ch) and a moderated discussion forum.
