= Klangkuenstler =

German DJ and record producer (born 1990)

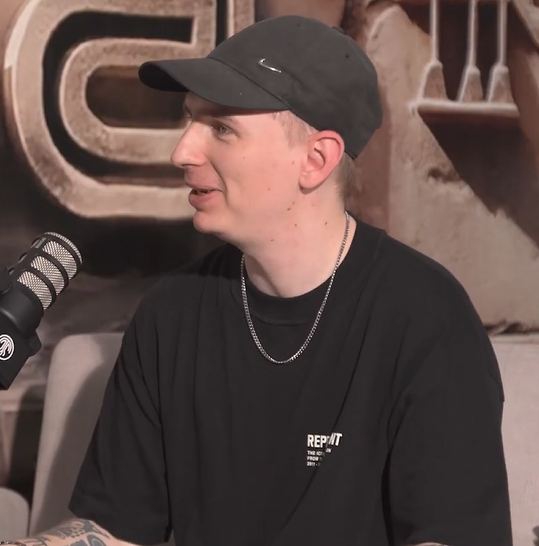
- Klangkuenstler in 2024

Background information
- Born: Michael Korb; 18 June 1990 (age 36); Füssen, Bavaria, West Germany
- Genres: Techno
- Occupations: DJ; Record producer

Michael Korb (born 18 June 1990), known professionally as Klangkuenstler, is a German DJ and record producer.

== Biography ==
Korb was born in Füssen, Bavaria on 18 June 1990. Originally from the Allgäu region, he moved to Munich at the age of 18, where he began an apprenticeship as a hotel manager. During his apprenticeship, he increasingly encountered electronic music, which he continued to pursue. In 2011, Korb founded the record label Zuckerton Records, which focuses on electronic dance music, and in 2019, the record label Outworld.

Klangkuenstler's first performance at the techno club Ritter Butzke led him to move to the German capital, Berlin, in the summer of 2012. His first album, titled Das bin ich, was released in 2013. He played electronic music, such as deep and tech house, until he increasingly produced techno music in 2018. In October 2023, the founding of a new label with an integrated artist agency together with the German DJ Kobosil was announced. The project, which also includes the fashion lines of the two artists, is called Tote Sonne (Dead Sun).

== Discography ==
=== Studio albums ===
Year	Title	Label
2013	Das bin ich	Kallias
2014	That’s me	Sunday Best

=== Singles and EPs ===
Year	Title	Label
2012	Goldblaeserdirigentin EP	Ton liebt Klang
2012	Darling / Tuba Libre	Ostfunk
2012	Wiesenexpress	Zuckerton
2013	Glücks EP	Kallias
2013	Barfuß auf Wolken	Zuckerton
2013	This is Awesome / Closer EP	Kallias
2014	Hand in Hand	Soundplate
2014	State of Mind	Stil vor Talent
2015	Thinkin Bout You (feat. Linda Muriel)	Work
2016	Jam Master Jack	Smiley Fingers
2016	Feel the Power	Simma Black
2016	Whistle Weapon	Smiley Fingers
2016	Rise Against the Arp EP	Stil Vor Talent
2017	House Nation EP	Toolroom
2017	Klangkuenslter | Jiggler EP	Stil Vor Talent
2017	Pop Dem Bottles	Entretenimiento
2017	Dance With Me	Deeperfect
2017	Remember Way Back EP	Toolroom
2018	The People EP	Superfett
2018	Mortalis	Filth on Acid
2018	Cathedral of Saw	Filth on Acid
2018	Dimension Null	Stil Vor Talent
2018	Rise of the Phoenix	We Are The Brave
2019	Outworld 001	Outworld
2019	Balthazar EP	Outworld
2019	Lebendige Geister	Filth on Acid
2019	Dunkle Illusion	Second State
2019	Hexenmeister EP	Outworld
2020	Armageddon	Outworld
2020	Himmelreich	Outworld
2021	Weltschmerz	Outworld
2022	Deine Angst	Outworld
2023	Die Welt Brennt	Outworld
2024	Toter Schmetterling (feat. Sant)	Outworld
2025	Sonne Geht Auf	Outworld
