= Mau P =

Dutch DJ and producer

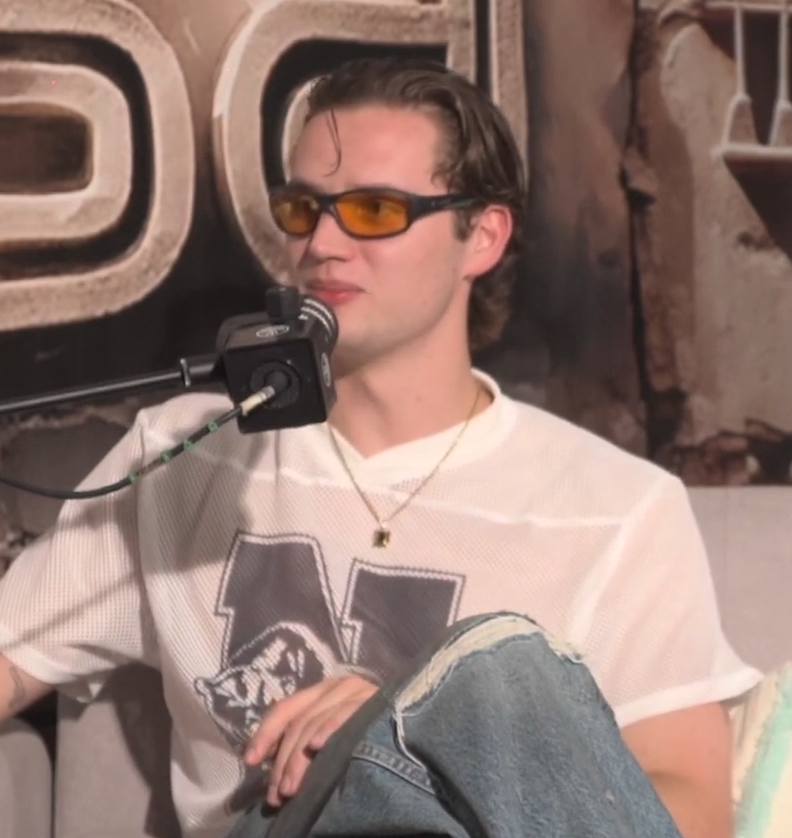
- Mau P in 2024

Background information
- Also known as: Maurice West
- Born: Maurits Jan Westveen; 26 October 1996 (age 30); Amsterdam, Netherlands
- Genres: Techno, tech house, house
- Occupations: DJ, record producer
- Years active: 2014–present
- Labels: Afterlife; Republic; Columbia; Repopulate Mars; Insomniac; Black Book; Defected
- Website: www.maupmusic.com

Maurits Jan Westveen (born 26 October 1996), known by his stage name Mau P, is a Dutch DJ and producer.

Formerly known as Maurice West, he, since 2022, has been producing and playing electronic music predominantly in the house and techno genre.

== Career ==
Maurits Jan Westveen was born in Amsterdam on 26 October 1996.

On 19 August 2022, Mau P released his debut single "Drugs from Amsterdam" via Repopulate Mars and landed the number 1 position on Beatport's main chart. Also Reinier Zonneveld and Armand van Helden made an official remix, and Billboard magazine picked "Drugs from Amsterdam" as one of the Best 50 Dance Tracks of 2022.

He released the song "Metro" together with Kevin de Vries, which Billboard magazine ranked as one of the best dance tracks of 2023.

In 2024, he debuted at the DJ Mag's Top 100 DJs list at 91. In 2025, he climbed up to number 77.

== Discography ==
=== As Mau P ===
==== EPs ====
List of extended plays, showing title and selected details
Title	Details
Too Big for B-Side	Released: 23 May 2025; Label: Diynamic; Format: Digital download, streaming

==== Singles ====
List of singles as Mau P, showing year released, title, charts positions and label name
Year	Title	Peak chart positions					Label
Year	Title	LTU Air.	MKD Air.	UKR Air.	US Dance/ Electro.	US Dance Air.	Label
2022	"Drugs from Amsterdam"	—	—	—	25	16	Repopulate Mars
2023	"Gimme That Bounce"	—	—	—	35	—	Insomniac
2023	"Your Mind Is Dirty"	—	—	—	—	—	Experts Only
2023	"Metro" (with Kevin de Vries)	—	—	—	—	—	Afterlife
2023	"Dress Code"	—	—	—	—	—	Black Book
2024	"Beats for the Underground"	—	—	—	—	—	Repopulate Mars
2024	"On Again"	—	—	—	—	24	Insomniac
2024	"Receipts" (with Diplo featuring Gunna)	—	—	—	24	—	Columbia
2024	"Merther"	—	—	—	—	—	Defected
2025	"The Less I Know the Better"	—	—	—	14	1	Nervous
2025	"Like I Like It"	—	—	—	15	—	Diynamic
2025	"People Talk People Sing"	—	—	—	—	—	Diynamic
2025	"Tesla"	—	—	—	12	1	Insomniac
2026	"Neck"	—	—	—	19	1	Black Book
2026	"Just a Little Bit More"	88	2	47	13	7	Generation Rebrand
"—" denotes a recording that did not chart or was not released in that territory.

==== Remixes ====
List of remixes as Mau P, which only officially released by himself, original artists or label, showing year released, original artists, title and label name
Year	Original artists	Title	Peak chart positions		Label
Year	Original artists	Title	LAT Air.	LTU Air.	Label
2023	Calvin Harris & Ellie Goulding	"Miracle" (Mau P Remix)	116	35	Columbia
2023	Armand van Helden	"I Want Your Soul" (Mau P Remix)	—	—	Southern Fried
2023	Swedish House Mafia	"Ray of Solar" (Mau P Remix)	—	—	Republic
"—" denotes a recording that did not chart or was not released in that territory.

=== As Maurice West ===
==== Singles ====
List of singles as Maurice West, showing year released, title and label name
Year	Title	Label
2014	"Formula"	Spinnin' Talent Pool
2015	"Medusa"	Armada Zouk
2015	"Yin Yang"	Mainstage Music
2015	"Kung Fu" (with Kenneth G)	Mainstage Music
2015	"Blaze (Sweet Lies)"	Armada Trice
2016	"Labyrinth"	Free Download
2016	"Poseidon" (with Maestro Harrell)	Mainstage Music
2016	"Dojo"	Mainstage Music
2016	"Temple" (with DBSTF)	Mainstage Music
2016	"Disco Weapon" (with MOTi)	Musical Freedom
2016	"Don't You Say"	Mainstage Music
2017	"Love & Money"	Mainstage Music
2017	"Festival of Lights" (with KSHMR)	Dharma Worldwide
2017	"Voices in My Head"	Mainstage Music
2018	"Rhythm of the Night" (with SaberZ)	Mainstage Music
2018	"Robots in Love"	Mainstage Music
2018	"Seven Seas"	Dharma Worldwide
2018	"The Kick"	Rave Culture
2019	"The Matrix" (with W&W)	Rave Culture
2019	"In the Zone"	Rave Culture
2019	"What the F?!"	Euforika
2019	"Euforika 2000"	Euforika
2020	"Boogie Machine"	Euforika
2020	"This Melody"	Euforika
2020	"Partystarter (Where Is the Party)"	Euforika
2020	"Rollin'"	Euforika
2021	"Funky Town" (with MATTN)	Smash The House
2021	"Outta Control Again"	Armada Music
2022	"Sky Turns Dark"	Armada Music
2022	"Looking for Your Love"	Armada Music
2022	"Maniac"	Armada Music
2022	"Gasoline"	Armada Music

==== Remixes ====
List of remixes as Maurice West, which only officially released by himself, original artists or label, showing year released, original artists and title name
Year	Original artists	Title	Label
2015	Headhunterz feat. Raphaella	"To Be Me" (Maurice West Remix)	Ultra
2017	Tiësto & Kshmr feat. Talay Riley	"Harder" (Maurice West Remix)	Musical Freedom
2018	Gloria Gaynor	"I Will Survive" (Maurice West Bootleg)	Free Download
2018	Cascada	"Everytime We Touch" (Hardwell & Maurice West Remix)	Zoo Digital
2018	Guru Josh Project	"Infinity 2008" (Maurice West Bootleg)	Free Download
2018	Steve Aoki feat. Ina Wroldsen	"Lie to Me" (Maurice West Remix)	Ultra
2019	Planet Perfecto Knights	"ResuRection" (Maurice West Remix)	Rave Culture / Perfecto
2019	Dimitri Vegas & Like Mike feat. Era Istrefi	"Selfish" (Maurice West Remix)	Smash The House
2019	Armin van Buuren & Garibay feat. Justin Jesso	"Phone Down" (Maurice West Remix)	Armada Music
2022	Lock 'n' Load	"Blow Ya Mind" (Maurice West Remix)	Armada Music

== Awards and nominations ==
Mau P has earned several nominations and accolades since his debut. He has won two EDMA Awards out of eighteen nominations, including two awards for his song "Drugs from Amsterdam", which won both Song of the Year and Dance Song of the Year in 2023. He was named the Breakout Artist of 2023 by media outlet Dancing Astronaut and in the same year received the SLAM! Global Breakthrough Award during Amsterdam Dance Event in 2023.

List of awards and nominations received by Mau P
Year	Award	Category	Nominated work	Result	Ref.
2023	Dancing Astronaut	Breakout Artist of 2023	Himself	Honored	
2023	SLAM!	Global Breakthrough Award	Himself	Won	
2023	Electronic Dance Music Awards	Best New Artist	Himself	Nominated	
2023	Electronic Dance Music Awards	Dance Song of the Year (Non-Radio)	"Drugs from Amsterdam"	Won	
2023	Electronic Dance Music Awards	House Song of the Year	"Drugs from Amsterdam"	Won	
2023	Electronic Dance Music Awards	Tech House DJ of the Year	Himself	Nominated	
2024	Electronic Dance Music Awards	Dance Song of the Year	"Gimme That Bounce"	Nominated	
2024	Electronic Dance Music Awards	Club DJ of the Year	Himself	Nominated	
2024	Electronic Dance Music Awards	Tech House Song of the Year	"Dress Code"	Nominated	
2024	Electronic Dance Music Awards	Tech House Artist of the Year	Himself	Nominated	
2024	Electronic Dance Music Awards	Techno Song of the Year	"Metro" (with Kevin de Vries)	Nominated	
2024	Electronic Dance Music Awards	Remix of the Year	Calvin Harris and Ellie Goulding – "Miracle" (Mau P Remix)	Nominated	
2025	Electronic Dance Music Awards	Tech House Artist of the Year	Himself	Nominated	
2025	Electronic Dance Music Awards	Tech House Song of the Year	"Beats for the Underground"	Nominated	
2025	Electronic Dance Music Awards	House Song of the Year	"Merther"	Nominated	
2025	Electronic Dance Music Awards	Best Use of Sample	"Merther"	Nominated	
2026	Electronic Dance Music Awards	Dance Radio Song Of The Year	"The Less I Know The Better"	Nominated	
2026	Electronic Dance Music Awards	Dance Radio Artist of the Year	Himself	Nominated	
2026	Electronic Dance Music Awards	Tech House Artist of the Year	Himself	Nominated	
2026	Electronic Dance Music Awards	Dance Radio Song Of The Year	"The Less I Know The Better"	Nominated	
2026	International Dance Music Awards	Artist of the Year	Himself	Nominated	
2026	International Dance Music Awards	Best Song (Electronic)	"Like I Like It"	Won	
2026	International Dance Music Awards	Dance Artist of the Year	Himself	Nominated	
2026	Beatport Awards	Best-Selling Track of the Year	"Like I Like It"	Won	

=== Listicles ===
Name of publisher, year, listicle, listed work and placement result
Publisher	Year	Listicle	Listed work	Result	Notes	Ref.
1001Tracklist	2023	Top 200 Tracks of 2023	"Miracle" (Mau P Remix)	68th	—	
1001Tracklist	2023	Top 100 Dance Tracks of 2023	"Miracle" (Mau P Remix)	16th	—	
1001Tracklist	2025	Top 10 Tracks	"The Less I Know The Better"	1st	—	
1001Tracklist	2025	The Most DJ Supported Tracks: Top 200	"The Less I Know The Better"	1st	—	
1001Tracklist	2025	The Most DJ Supported Tracks: Top 200	"Tesla"	16th	—	
1001Tracklist	2025	The Most DJ Supported Tracks: Top 200	"People Talk People Sing"	48th	—	
1001Tracklist	2025	Top 100 Tracks of Tech House of 2025	"The Less I Know The Better"	1st	—	
1001Tracklist	2025	Top 100 Tracks of Tech House of 2025	"Like I Like It"	3rd	—	
1001Tracklist	2025	Top 100 Tracks of Tech House of 2025	"Tesla"	9th	—	
1001Tracklist	2025	Top 100 Tracks of Tech House of 2025	"People Talk People Sing"	16th	—	
1001Tracklist	2025	Top 100 Tracks of Tech House of 2025	"Merther"	27th	—	
Beatport	2025	The Top 10 Best-Selling Tech House Tracks of 2025	"Like I Like It"	1st	—	
Beatport	2025	The Top 10 Best-Selling Tech House Tracks of 2025	"The Less I Know The Better" (Extended Mix)	2nd	—	
Beatport	2025	The Top 10 Best-Selling Tech House Artists of 2025	Himself	1st	—	
Beatport	2025	10 Most Shazammed Tracks of the 2025	"Like I Like It"	7th	—	
Beatport	2025	Top 100 Chart Toppers 2025: Tech House	"Like I Like It"	1st	—	
Beatport	2025	Top 100 Chart Toppers 2025: Tech House	"The Less I Know The Better" (Extended Mix)	2nd	—	
Beatport	2025	Top 100 Chart Toppers 2025: Tech House	"Tesla" (Extended Mix)	18th	—	
Beatport	2025	Top 100 Chart Toppers 2025: Tech House	"People Talk People Sing"	34th	—	
Billboard	2022	The 50 Best Dance Songs of 2022	"Drugs from Amsterdam"	Listed	—	
Billboard	2023	The 30 Best Dance Songs of 2023	"Metro" (with Kevin de Vries)	Listed	—	
DJ Mag	2024	Top 100 DJs	Himself	91st	New entry	
DJ Mag	2025	Top 100 DJs	Himself	77th	▲	
DJ Mag	2026	Top 100 DJs	Himself	55th	▲	
