= Roza Terenzi =

- Also known as: Roza Terenzi, Catlips, Gloworm
- Born: Katie Campbell
- Origin: Australia
- Occupation: Musician
- Label: Planet Euphorique

Roza Terenzi is the alias of Katie Campbell, an Australian DJ and music producer. Originally from Perth, she moved to Melbourne in 2017 and released her debut album as Roza Terenzi in January 2020.

== Career ==
Growing up, Katie Campbell played piano, drums and guitar. Her father produced electronic music in his studio during the 90s, and they began collaborating when she was nine years old. They released one song Clap to the Crap Rap, credited to KayTee.

Both parents supported Katie to study at the Western Australian Academy of the Performing Arts. It was there she became more influenced by electronic music such as Aphex Twin and Venetian Snares, and she began performing under the name Catlips.

After releasing her Casual EP in 2015 as Catlips, Katie created a new alias Roza Terenzi in 2016, in reference to Italian astrophysicist and musician Fiorella Terenzi. In 2019 she debuted a new alias Gloworm.

As Roza Terenzi, Katie has released several singles and EPs, and toured around the world and performed at Meredith and Primavera festivals. In 2020 she released Modern Bliss, the debut Roza Terenzi album, on label Planet Euphorique.

Pitchfork gave Modern Bliss 7/10, while Resident Adviser called it "a tightly produced, fluid and euphoric listening experience". Billboard listed it as one of the ten electronic albums they were looking forward to, Mixmag called it one of the best albums of 2020 so far, and it was listed as #33 of Crack Magazine's Top 50 Albums of 2020.

Katie has also been praised for her mixes as Roza Terenzi, with Red Bull and Pitchfork both listing her work as some of the best in 2020.

Towards the end of 2020, she released Stylish Tantrum, the first album on her newly created label Step Ball Chain.

In December 2021 she released Pinky's Network with Hame DJ on the Greenhouse compilation, followed in January 2022 by Third Nature, a collaborative single with fellow Australian producer jd (Jack Doepel), on Step Ball Chain.

She released a collaborative album with D. Tiffany titled Edge Of Innocence in 2022, alongside another collaborative album with Byron Yeates and D.Tiffany titled splitstep.

Eternity, Forever, was released in November 2023 as a three-track digital EP, with profits donated to the Berlin Legal Fund (now 3EZWA) to support the ELSC and Palastina Kampagne.

In February 2025, she released Ministry Of Wish, a four-track EP. Later in July, she released and exclusive track in collaboration with Radio Eyewear, Year of the Bad Lala.

In 2024, Step Ball Chains' "unconventional prototype band", trickpony, put out their debut five track release Pillow Talk, with Terenzi joining forces with Mike Midnight and Maria Korkelia. The trio have since released 24/7 Heaven in 2025.

She joined james K on the Friend Remixes album, contributing On God (Roza Terenzi Remix) in early 2026.

Terenzi has announced her latest full-length album, RUST, will be available December 4th, 2026.

== Advocacy ==
Katie has been vocal about her support for social movements. In summer of 2020, during the rise of the BLM movement, Katie took to Instagram to acknowledge the impact black culture has had on music and the fact that artists like her wouldn't be where they are without it. She also professed her solidarity to the indigenous peoples of Australia, the land where she grew up, and prompted fans to donate in support of these causes. In 2023, she was among 19 artists who canceled their scheduled performances at Field Day festival in London and joined an international boycott of its owner Superstruct Entertainment, citing its parent company KKR's investments in Israeli companies linked to the Gaza genocide.

== Festival performances (December 2025 - 2026) ==
Date	Event	Location
Upcoming: August 17 2027	Dekmantel Selectors	The Garden, Tisno,Croatia
Upcoming: July 7 2027	Love International 2027	The Garden, Tisno,Croatia
Upcoming: December 19 2026	Gateway Festival 2026	Melbourne, Australia
October 31 2026	Origins: Roza Terenzi & D. Tiffany (All Night Long) + Mama Snake, THC	FOLD, London
October 29 2026	Ekko Festival 2026	Bergen, Norway
September 18 2026	Making Time	Fort Mifflin, Philadelphia
September 10 2026	Sustain-Release Year Twelve	Camp Kennybrook, New York
August 30 2026	Body Movements Festival 2026	Southwark park, London
August 27 2026	Schwing und Stampf Festival 2026	TBA
August 27 2026	Dimensions Festival 2026	Tisno,Croatia
August 21 2026	Field Maneuvers 2026	
August 15 2026	XRDS Festival 2026	Anderlecht, Belgium
August 13 2026	Module Festival	Frankfurt, Germany
August 8 2026	Paradigm Festival	Gronigen, Netherlands
July 17 2026	WHOLE Festival 2026	Leipzig, Germany
July 2 2026	Memori	St. Jean-de-Laur, France
June 5 2026	Primavera Sound 2026	Barcelona, Spain
May 14 2026	Wire Festival 2026	New Zork City
May 13 2026	Nuit Sonores 2026	Lyon, France
May 7 2026	Sandbox Festival	Egypt
May 2 2026	Pavillion Festival 2026	Scotland
December 31 2025	New Years at The Bowl	Melbourne, Australia
December 30 2025	un:send	Melbourne, Australia

== Discography ==
Singles/EPs

Casual (2015) as Catlips

The "O.G." EP (2017)

Weakest Link (2018)

Glo With The Floooo (2019) as Gloworm

Stylish Tantrum (2020)

Third Nature (2022) with jd

Eternity, Forever EP (2023)

Pillow Talk EP (2024) as trickpony

Year of the Bad Lala (2025)

Ministry of Wish EP (2025)

24/7 Heaven (2025) as trickpony

Albums

Modern Bliss (2020)

Edge Of Innocence (2022) with D. Tiffany

splitstep (2022) with D. Tiffany and Byron Yeates.

RUST (December 2026)

== Awards and nominations ==
Year	Award	Category	Work	Result	Ref.
2019	Corner Award	n/a	n/a	Shortlisted	
2020	International Dance Music Awards	Downtempo (Female)	n/a	Nominated	
2020	Australian Music Prize	n/a	Modern Bliss	Shortlisted	
