= Drumcode Records =

Swedish record label

Drumcode logotype

Drumcode Records is a Swedish Techno label managed by Adam Beyer. The label was founded in 1996 and has enjoyed a streak of success in its releases, talent scouting, radio efforts, and general international label camaraderie ever since. Its roots are in its native Scandinavia, originally only housing Swedish producers, but in the label's history it has since branched out to working with those whose sound fit the profile, rather than whose nationality aligns best.

== Artists ==
- Adam Beyer
- Amelie Lens
- Cari Lekebusch
- Green Velvet
- Hertz
- Ida Engberg
- Jay Lumen
- Jerome Sydenham
- Jesper Dahlbäck
- Joey Beltram
- Joseph Capriati
- Maceo Plex
- Marco Carola
- Nicole Moudaber
- Pan-Pot
- Sam Paganini
- Slam
- Steve Lawler
- Victor Calderone

== Podcast ==
Label owner Adam Beyer also hosts the techno podcast Drumcode Radio Live.

== See also ==
- List of record labels
