= Cari Lekebusch =

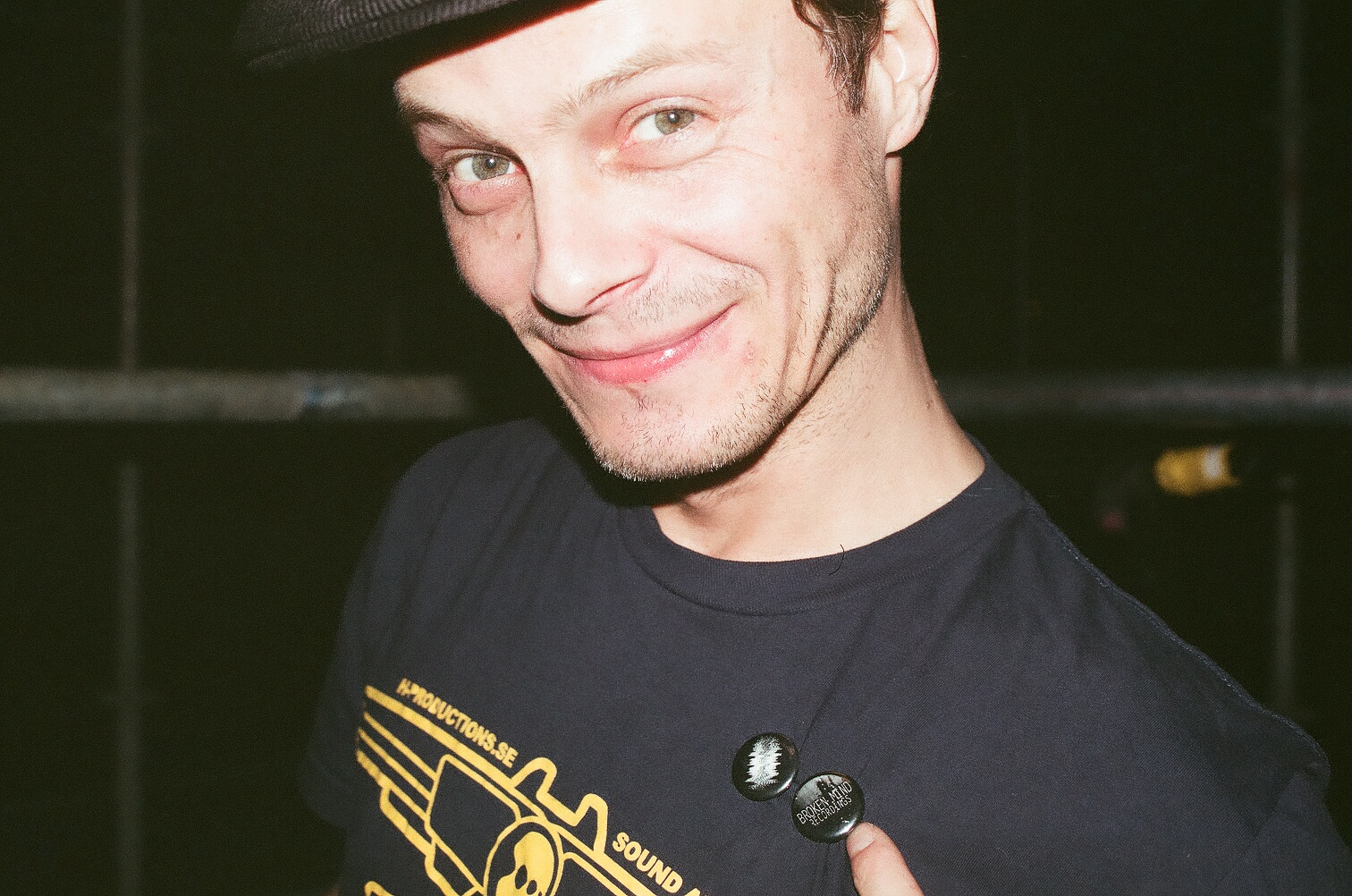

Cari Lekebusch (born 1972) is a Swedish electronic music producer and DJ based in Stockholm. His productions range from techno to hip hop.

== Career ==
In the early 1990s, Lekebusch became a member of the Stockholm-based remix service group SweMix that at that time had notable members as Denniz Pop and StoneBridge (who is called the grandfather of Swedish house music). After a while, Lekebusch started to venture out from remixing other artists to create his own music that became not even nearly as mainstream as SweMix productions and at the same time Lekebusch really started to explore techno and electronic dance music. Lekebusch left the remix group not long after.

Since the early-mid 1990s, he has collaborated with Adam Beyer, Robert Leiner, Alexi Delano, Thomas Krome, Jesper Dahlbäck, Joel Mull, Mark Williams and many more. Lekebusch has been in the constellation Kozmic Gurt Brodhas (a.k.a. KGB); the two other members are Abi Lönnberg and David Roiseux. Lekebusch also started to produce for other artists as well with music leaning more towards hip-hop with electronic influences, two being Max Peezay and NFL Kru.

In 2023, Cari Lekebusch collaborated with Nordic audio-visual startup Chroma to release EZPZ, a free iOS app that allows users—regardless of musical background—to “doodle” with sound using intuitive “sound brushes,” blending music-making with visual creativity.

== Aliases ==
Lekebusch has recorded under many aliases like Agent Orange, Braincell, Cerebus, Crushed Insect, Fred, Fred to the Midwest, Kari Pekka, Magenta, Mr. Barth, Mr. James Barth, Mystic Letter K, Phunkey Rhythm Doctor, Rotortype, Rubberneck, Shape Changer, Sir Jeremy Augustus Hutley of Granith Hall, Szerementa Programs, The Mantis, Vector, and Yakari.

== Influences ==
Some of Lekebusch's early musical influences are Afrika Bambaata, Kraftwerk, James Brown, Mantronix, Herbie Hancock, Ralph Lundsten and Egyptian Lover.

== H Productions ==
He owns a record label, H. Productions, founded and managed by himself. The original name of the record label was Hybrid productions, but a legal twist in 1998 with Japanese label Avex Trax's British group Hybrid forced Lekebusch to change his record label name to its present name. His studio is called HP HQ (Hybrid Production Headquarters).

== Selected discography ==
- Dirty Epic, Eyepoint EP, H. Productions, 2021
- Juicy Lucy, 12", Acid All Stars, 2008
- Handle with Care, 12", Audio Emotions, 2006
- Darkfunk Matters, 12", Tortured Records, 2005
- Prophecies (alias Mystic Letter K), LP, H. Productions, 2005
- The Architect, CD/LP, Truesoul Records, 2004
- Chaos & Order, CD/LP, H. Productions, 2000
- Det Jag Vet, CD, H. Productions, 1999
- Stealin Music (alias Mr. James Barth), CD/LP, Svek, 1998
- Vänsterprassel Me, 12", Drumcode Records, 1996
