= Rebekah (DJ) =

English DJ and music producer

Rebekah Teasdale (17 April 1980) is a British DJ and dance music producer, known professionally as DJ Rebekah. She runs the Decoy and Elements labels, and produces and deejays industrial techno and hardstyle. DJ magazine described her as "one of the figureheads leading the revival of industrial-strength techno", and her debut LP as showcasing "a touch for techno’s melding of (wo)man and machine, pouring encoded emotion into an exoskeleton of four-four techno and broken beats".

== Early life ==
Rebekah Teasdale grew up in Birmingham, going to techno parties at the Que Club and studying music production at Access Creative College. She also worked as a glamour model.

== Career ==
DJ Rebekah started to play records professionally whilst in her twenties, signing up with Judge Jules' agency Serious. She moved to London and then Berlin, making a name as a DJ for playing industrial techno sets. She met Chris Liebing and was released on his CLR label. She has released tracks on labels such as EarToGround, Gynoid Audio, Naked Lunch, Sleaze and Stolen Moments. She runs the record labels Decoy Records and Elements and released her first LP entitled Fear Paralysis in on Soma in 2017. She was voted best producer by DJ Mag in 2018. In 2025, Rebekah released the single "Rave Creators" in collaboration with the Italian artist ORYMA on Verknipt Records.

DJ Rebekah now performs sober. In September 2020, she released an open letter to the music industry on Change.org following allegations of sexual assault against Erick Morillo, launching a campaign called #ForTheMusic.
