= Kobosil =

German DJ and record producer (born 1991)

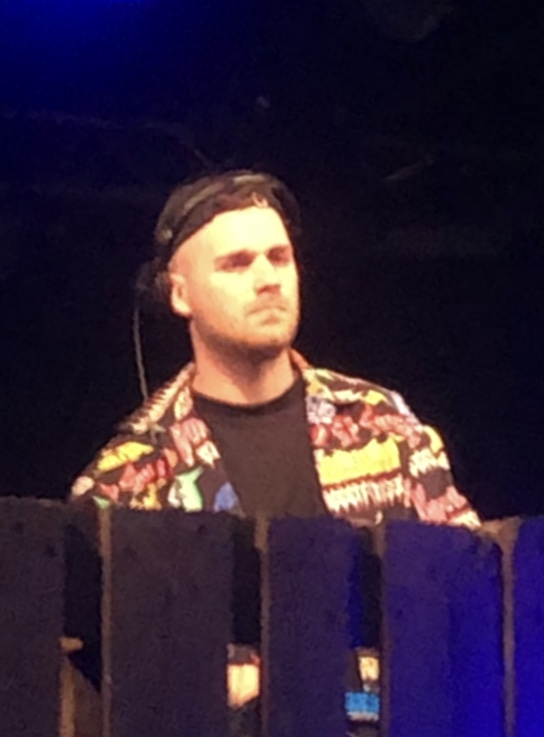
- Kobosil in 2019

Background information
- Born: Max Kobosil; 5 April 1991 (age 35); Neukölln, Berlin, Germany
- Occupations: DJ; Record producer

Max Kobosil (born 5 April 1991), known mononymously as Kobosil, is a German DJ and record producer.

== Early life ==
Kobosil was born in the Berlin district of Neukölln. As a child, he was primarily interested in German hip-hop, but his sister eventually introduced him to EDM at the age of 14. He states that the track "Jack Your Body" by P. Diddy and Felix da Housecat particularly convinced him of techno: "I couldn't believe the beat. It blew me away; that's exactly what I wanted to do." Together with two friends, who also became active as DJs under the names Somewhen and Nitam, he began experimenting with the genre himself.

== Career ==
At 17, Kobosil began playing techno and house music in Berlin. At 18, he visited the Berlin club Berghain for the first time and made contacts in the techno scene. There, he met producer Andreas Baumecker, one half of the duo Barker & Baumecker. A remix that Kobosil created of their track "Silo" was finally released in January 2013 on Berghain's own label, Ostgut Ton. This marked Kobosil's breakthrough as an artist. In June of the same year, he founded his own label, RK, and released his debut EP, RK3. Shortly thereafter, he DJed at Berghain for the first time. His next EP, titled "Mdr 10," was released under Marcel Dettmann's label, Marcel Dettmann Records. From December 2014 to 2019, Kobosil was a resident DJ at Berghain.

Kobosil became known throughout Germany and internationally and has been a full-time musician and DJ in clubs and festivals since 2015. In 2016, he released his debut album, "We Grow, You Decline." Other artists subsequently released their music on his label, which was later renamed R Label Group.

In 2021, Kobosil founded a fashion line called 44 Label Group, with the number 44 referring to Neukölln's old postal code. He was supported by Italian fashion designer Claudio Antonioli. Also in 2021, Kobosil released the track "Kobosil" together with Berlin rapper Ufo361 on his album "Destroy All Copies." In October 2022, the two artists collaborated again with the song "Lucifer," which was included on Kobosil's EP "RK5."

In October 2023, Kobosil announced the founding of a new label with an integrated artist agency together with fellow German DJ Klangkuenstler. The project, which also includes the two artists' fashion lines, is called Tote Sonne. At the end of 2023, he dissolved the R Label Group.

== Musical style ==
Kobosil is known for his fast, aggressive techno. His musical style has been described as a "combination of darkness and ecstasy, of EBM, noise, and industrial."

== Personal life ==
Kobosil lives in Milan, Italy.

== Discography ==
=== Studio albums ===
- 2016: We Grow, You Decline

=== EPs ===
- 2013: RK3
- 2013: - -----
- 2014: Mdr 10
- 2014: RK1
- 2015: 91
- 2016: RK2
- 2017: 105
- 2019: RK4
- 2022: RK5

=== Singles ===
- 2022: Full of Fire
- 2024: Eiskalt (Short Mix)
- 2024: Radiance
