= Stephan Bodzin =

German DJ and producer

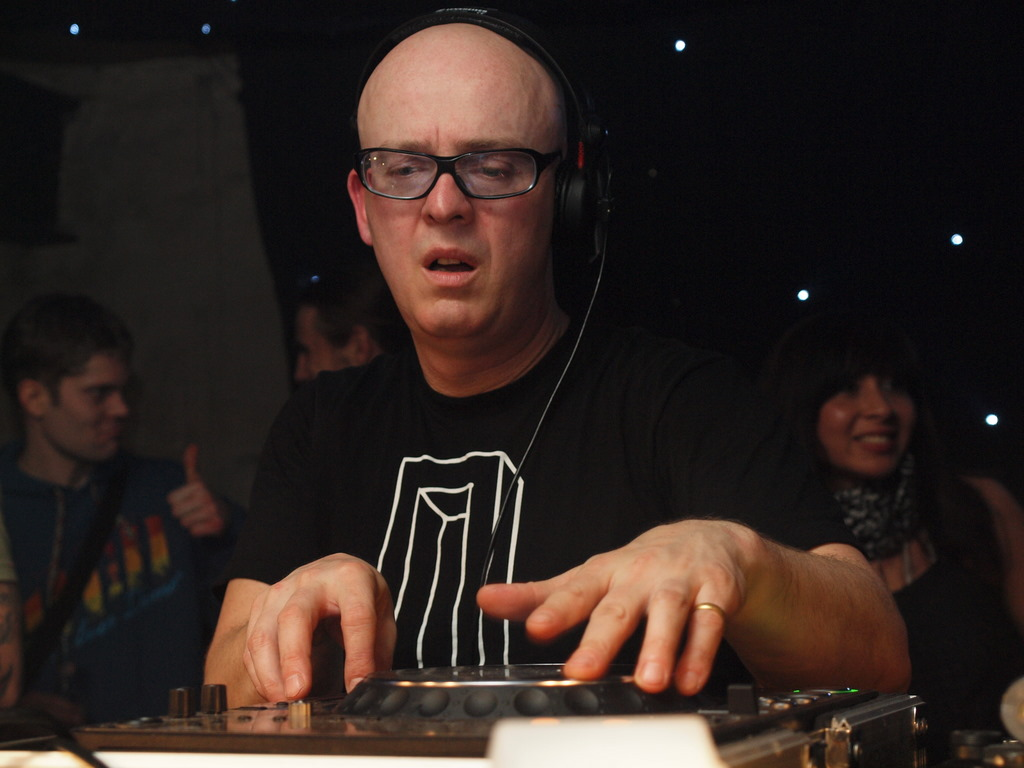
Stephan Bodzin

Stephan Bodzin (born 4 August 1969 in Bremen) is a German DJ, techno and trance producer, and record label owner. Stephan Bodzin also performs as a live artist. A classically educated musician, he is a producer of mainly electronic music projects. In May 2007, Bodzin's debut album Liebe Ist was released on the label Herzblut. His second album, Powers of Ten, was released in 2015 under the same label, and his third, Boavista, in 2021.

== Biography ==
Bodzin was born in Bremen, West Germany and is the son of an experimental musician. Composing music for European theaters was the first successful platform for Bodzin's music.

Producers Oliver Huntemann and Marc Romboy have worked with Bodzin. He has remixed songs for Depeche Mode, Booka Shade and The Knife. Bodzin has recorded on Get Physical, Datapunk, Gigolo, Systematic and Giant Wheel record labels.

He describes himself as a "melody man". DJ Hell dubbed Stephan Bodzin's tunes as the "Bremen sound".

Bodzin created his own record label called "HERZBLUT" in 2006.

== Discography ==
STEPHAN BODZIN

- Caligula / Marathon Man (Dec. 2005 - Systematic Recordings)
- Tron / Midnight Express (August 2006 - Systematic Recordings)
- Kerosene / Cucuma (Sept. 2006 - HERZBLUT)
- Pendulum / Silhouette (Sept. 2006 - Spielzeug Schallplatten)
- Valentine / Papillon (Okt. 2006 - HERZBLUT)
- Daytona Beach / Bedford (Jan. 2007 - Spielzeug Schallplatten)
- Liebe ist... / Mondfahrt (April 2007 – HERZBLUT)
- ALBUM Liebe ist... (May 2007 – HERZBLUT)
- Bremen Ost / Station 72 (March 2008 – HERZBLUT)
- ALBUM Powers Of Ten (2015 – HERZBLUT)
- Strand (2017 - HERZBLUT)
- ALBUM Boavista (2021 - Afterlife)

STEPHAN BODZIN vs MARC ROMBOY (with Marc Romboy)

- Ariel / Mab (Oct. 2007 - HERZBLUT)
- Callisto / Pandora (Jun. 2007 - Systematic Recordings)
- Puck / Io (Dec. 2006 - HERZBLUT)
- Telesto / Hydra (Nov. 2006 - Systematic Recordings)
- The Alchemist (August 2006 - 2020 Vision UK)
- Atlas / Hyperion (July 2006 - Systematic Recordings)
- Ferdinand / Phobos (May 2006 - Systematic Recordings)
- Luna / Miranda (Nov. 2005 - Systematic Recordings)

BODZIN & HUNTEMANN (with Oliver Huntemann)

- Black EP (Jan. 2006 Gigolo Records)
- Black Sun (April 2006 - Datapunk)

REKORDER (with Oliver Huntemann)

- Rekorder 1 (Sept. 2005 - Rekorder)
- Rekorder 2 (Nov. 2005 - Rekorder)
- Rekorder 3 (Jan. 2006 - Rekorder)
- Rekorder 4 (March 2006 - Rekorder)
- Rekorder 5 (May 2006 - Rekorder)
- Rekorder 6 (Sept. 2006 - Rekorder)
- Rekorder 7 (Dec. 2006 - Rekorder)
- Rekorder 8 (Apr. 2007 - Rekorder)
- Rekorder 9 (Juni 2007 - Rekorder)
- Rekorder 10 (Okt. 2007 - Rekorder)
- Rekorder 0 (March 2008 - Rekorder)

ELEKTROCHEMIE (with Thomas Schumacher & Caitlin Devlin)

- Mucky Star / Calling You (Jan. 2007 - Get Physical Music)
- Don't go / You're my kind (March 2006 - Get Physical Music)
- Pleasure Seeker EP (Oct. 2005 - Get Physical Music)

THOMAS SCHUMACHER (with Thomas Schumacher)

- Is Not EP (Nov. 2006 - Spielzeug Schallplatten)
- Home ALBUM (May 2006 - Spielzeug Schallplatten)
- Red Purple (March 2006 - Spielzeug Schallplatten)
- Kickschool 79 (Dec. 2005 - Spielzeug Schallplatten)
- Bring it Back EP (Sept. 2005 - Spielzeug Schallplatten)
- Heat it up (July 2005 - Spielzeug Schallplatten)
- Yara (March 2005 - Spielzeug Schallplatten)

H-MAN (with Oliver Huntemann)

- 51 Poland Street (Oct. 2006 - Giant Wheel)
- Turbo EP (Feb. 2006 - Giant Wheel)
- Mimi (Sept. 2005 - Giant Wheel)
- Spacer / Rock This Place (March 2005 Giant Wheel)
- Manga / Flip Flop (Nov. 2004 - Giant Wheel)

== Other Sources ==
- Feature at Resident Advisor
- Rekorder at Discogs
