= D. Tiffany =

- Born: Sophie Sweetland
- Origin: Vancouver, British Columbia, Canada
- Genres: House; Funk; Ambient
- Labels: Planet Euphorique; 1080p
- Website: dtiffany.bandcamp.com

Sophie Sweetland, known professionally as D. Tiffany, is a Canadian DJ and electronic musician. Originally from Vancouver, British Columbia, Sweetland is known for her electronic music and for founding the underground label Planet Euphorique. She is also known for her solo and collaborative EPs and albums with artists including Roza Terenzi and Nite Fleit.

== Career ==
Sweetland grew up near White Rock, British Columbia, and later moved to Chinatown, Vancouver, where she released her self-titled debut album with 1080p in 2014. In July 2019, her self-titled collaborative album with Terenzi under the alias DJ Zozi marked the first release on her label, Planet Euphorique. The label was named for an event series she hosted in Vancouver, and Sweetland focuses on signing artists to the label whom she knows personally or with whom she has previously collaborated.

In October 2018, Sweetland released the EP "Feel U", which had a positive reception and was commended for its atmosphere and use of funk. Her July 2019 mix, "Groove 216", was praised for its rhythm and breaks.

A March 2021 mix produced by Sweetland to promote the artists on her label, "The Sound Of: Planet Euphorique" received praise for its idealized and cheerful approach to rave music. Also in 2021, Sweetland released a collaboration with Terenzi, titled "Tapestry of Sound". Sweetland continues to organize and host events, including live collaborations with Terenzi.

== Style ==
Sweetland's music emphasizes her connections to rave and underground electronic music. Her music uses deep house rhythms and ambient style.

== Discography ==
=== Albums ===
- D. Tiffany (2014)
- Edge of Innocence (with Roza Terenzi) (2022)

=== Extended plays ===
- Blue Dream (2017)
- Feel U (2018)
- V2M (2018)
- Oscillate Tracks 001 (with Roza Terenzi) (2018)
- Cruel Trance (2020)
- Tapestry of Sound (with Roza Terenzi) (2021)
