= Ida Engberg =

Swedish techno DJ (born 1984)

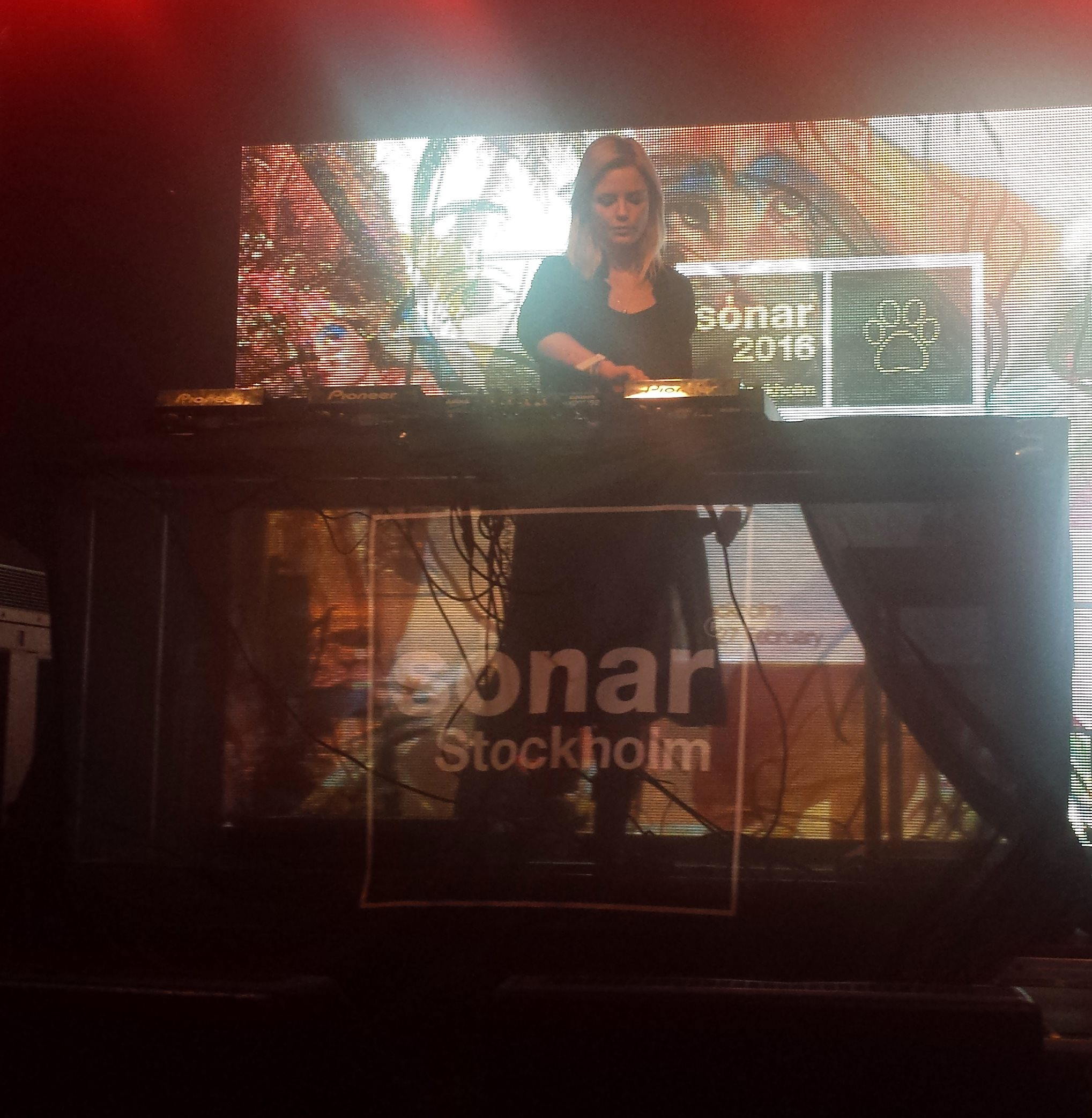
- Ida Engberg at Sonar Stockholm 2016.

Background information
- Born: 1 July 1984 (age 41); Tyresö, Stockholm County, Sweden
- Genres: Techno
- Occupations: DJ, record producer
- Years active: 2002–present

Ida Engberg (Swedish pronunciation: [ˈiːda ˈɛŋːbærj]; born 1 July 1984) is a Swedish techno DJ and record producer.

Engberg began her career when she was 13 spinning vinyl at the youth center after school. It was only a hobby but after filling in for another DJ at the age of 18 she got a regular night at a club. Later she went to work at the Spy Bar, one of the most famous clubs in Stockholm. In 2006, Engberg relocated to Ibiza for the season and expanded DJing into learning how to produce. Back in Stockholm she was offered a residency at the infamous Cocktail club.

The first single she released was "Disco Volante". The song became a hit in the Netherlands, Belgium and Germany in the summer of 2007. In 2008, Sébastien Léger remixed the song. This version was released in the spring of 2008. Engberg has also played at various large electronic music festivals.

Engberg was married to fellow Swedish DJ Adam Beyer. In 2011, their first child was born, and in 2014 their third child was born. In 2023, she announced on Instagram that they had divorced "two years ago". Engberg is vegan.
