= Sara Landry =

American DJ and producer

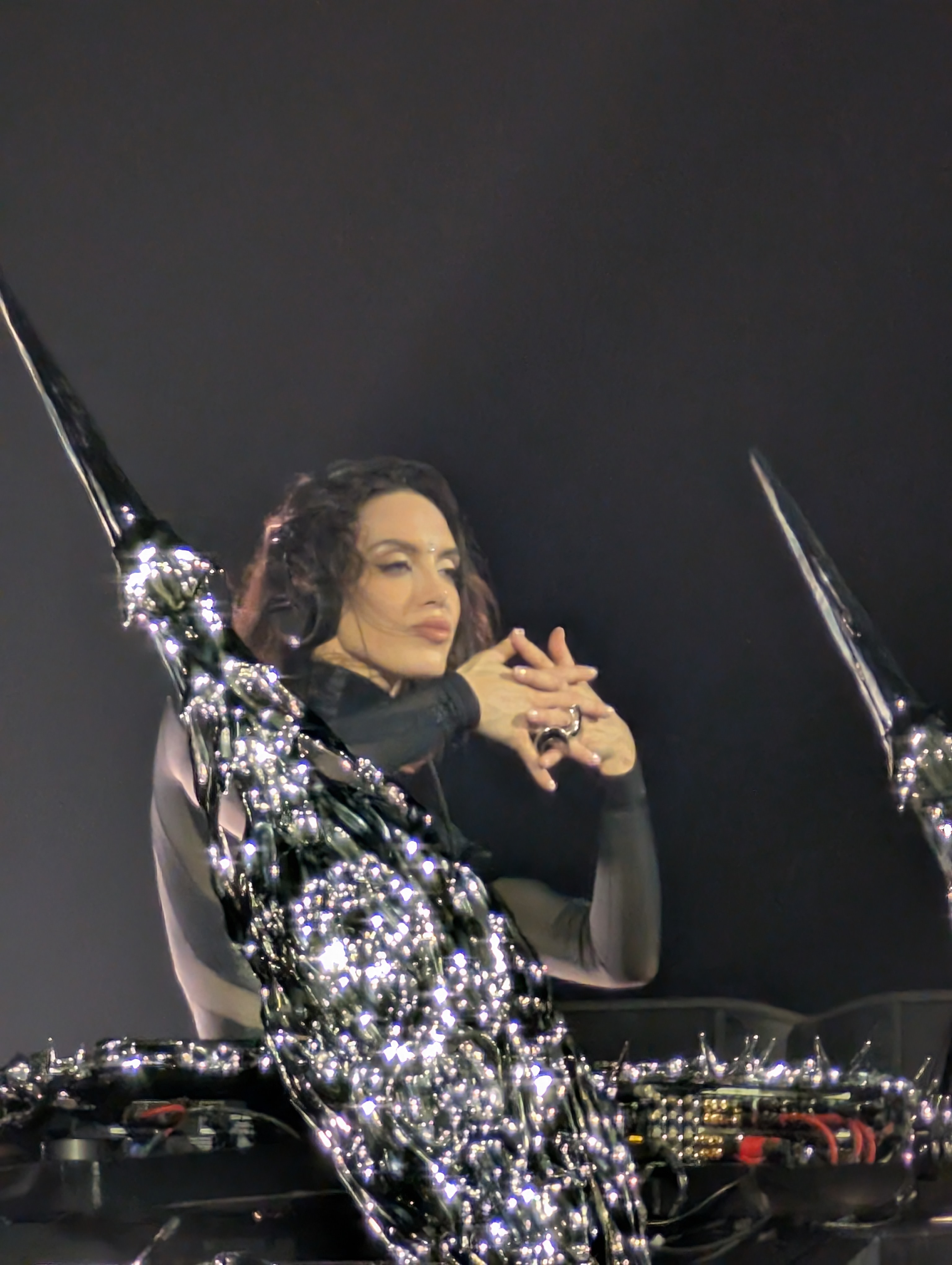
- Sara Landry performing at the Palace of Fine Arts in San Francisco on November 28, 2025

Background information
- Born: September 22, 1993 (age 33); Sausalito, California, United States
- Origin: Amsterdam, Netherlands
- Genre: Techno
- Occupations: DJ, music producer
- Years active: 2018–present
- Label: Hekate Records

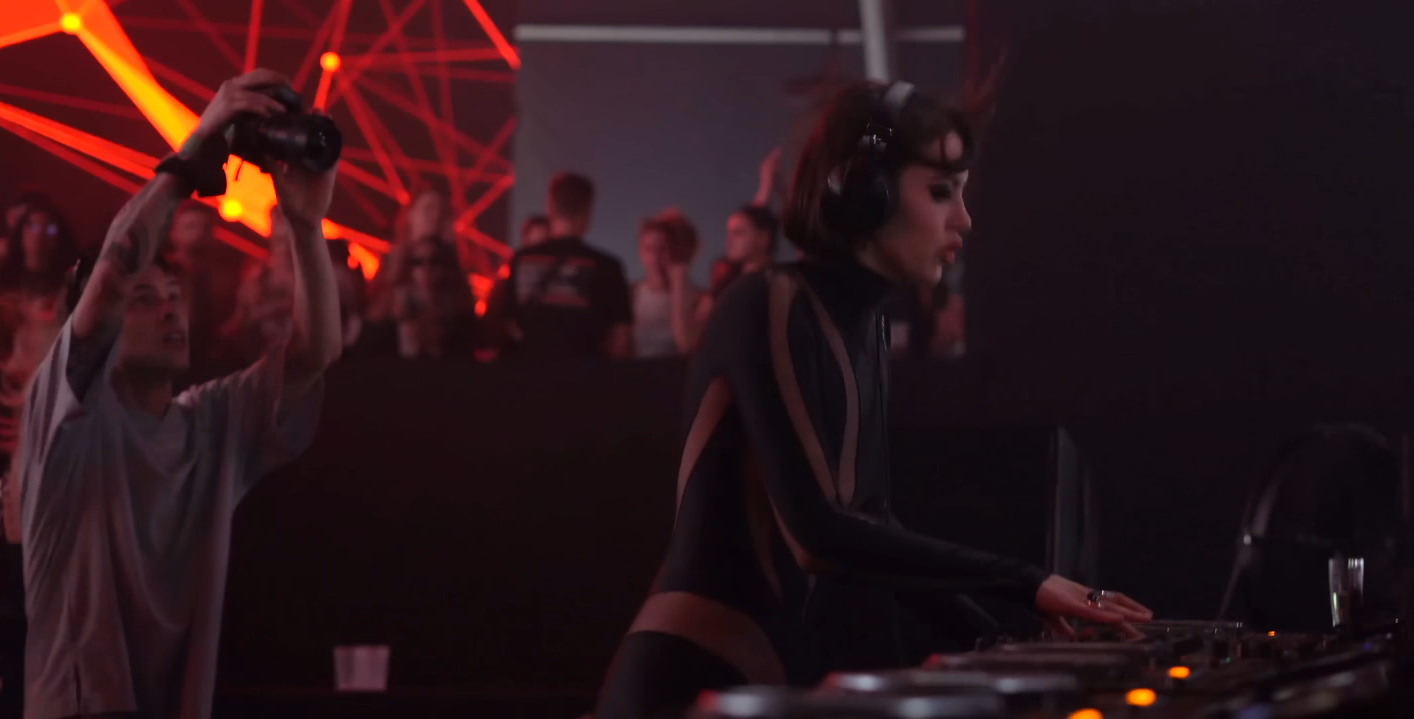
Sara Landry performance, Verknipt event 2023 Utrecht The Netherlands (description page)

Sara Landry is an American DJ and music producer who is currently based in Amsterdam, Netherlands. She is known for her hard techno sound. She is the founder and owner of the techno record label Hekate Records. In 2024 she ranked #75 in DJ Magazine's Top 100 DJs poll.

== Biography ==
Landry was born in Sausalito, California (September 22, 1993). At age three, she moved to Boulder, Colorado, and later to Austin, Texas, following her parents' divorce. At seventeen, she relocated to New York City for her studies, where she began her DJ career while working as a promoter.

After completing her studies, Landry returned to Austin, where she performed at venues including Kingdom, Plush, Parish, Vulcan Gas Company, and frequently at the Ethnics Music Lounge. In 2018, she released her debut single "Chasm". In 2019, she signed with Mau5trap and released her first EP "Wait".

In July 2021, Landry has launched her own record label Hekate Records.

In 2022, Landry relocated to Amsterdam, Netherlands, where she collaborated with Don Woezik on the techno album "Delirium". Her recognition grew significantly in 2023, when her Boiler Room debut set became the third most-streamed set of the year with over 6 million views.

== Career ==
=== Music style and production ===
Landry is known for her "dark, driving, and divinely feminine brand of industrial techno." She is a self-taught producer and audio engineer, and is often referred to as the "High Priestess of Hard Techno." Her music combines high frequency industrial sounds with ritualistic style. She was Beatport's top-selling female producer in the genre.

=== Record label ===
In 2021, Landry founded Hekate Records, named after the ancient Greek goddess of witchcraft, that has released music from established artists, including Nico Moreno, Shlømo, Charlie Sparks, and blk., in addition to music by emerging techno artists.

=== 2025-Present ===
In June 2025, Landry announced her largest headlining shows to date that are titled Eternalism.

On August 8, she returned to her roots by bringing Eternalism to Austin, Texas.

On March 29, 2026 at Ultra Miami 2026, she performed a B2B set with Amelie Lens to close the RESISTANCE stage that was the first collaboration between the two artists.

=== Notable performances ===
Landry has performed at major electronic-music festivals and venues worldwide, including:

- Boiler Room x Teletech - 11M views
- Knockdown Center NYC - 2.9M views
- Tomorrowland 2024 - 2M views
- EDC Las Vegas 2025 (KineticFIELD) - 964K views
- EDC Las Vegas 2024 (circuitGROUNDS) - 838K views
- Tomorrowland 2026 - 307K views
- Ultra Music Festival (RESISTANCE, The Cove Stage) - 145K views

== Discography ==
=== Albums ===
- “Spiritual Driveby” (2024, Hekate Records)
- "Divine Intervention" (2026, Hekate Records)

=== Extended plays ===
Title	Album details
Wait	Released: May 17, 2019; Label: Mau5trap; Formats: Digital
Signal	Released: November 1, 2019; Label: PinkStar Black; Formats: Digital
Sacrifice	Released: April 3, 2020; Label: Kraftek; Formats: Digital
Act of God (Inspired by "The Outlaw Ocean")	Released: June 5, 2020; Label: The Outlaw Ocean LLC; Formats: Digital
Queen of the Banshees	Released: January 18, 2021; Label: RAW; Formats: Digital
Rebirth	Released: April 9, 2021; Label: Techno Germany Records; Formats: Digital
Incoming	Released: July 30, 2021; Label: Hekate Records; Formats: Digital
About Last Night	Released: December 17, 2021; Label: Possession; Formats: Digital
Delirium (with Don Woezik)	Released: May 20, 2022; Label: Hekate Records; Formats: Digital
Hekataia EP	Released: April 10th, 2026; Label: Hekate Records; Format: Digital

=== Singles ===
- "Value" (2020, Self-released)
- "No Sleep" (2022, Hekate Records)
- "Chaos Magicka" (with Godtripper) (2023, Hekate Records)
- "Legacy" (2023, Hekate Records)
- "Heaven" (with Alt8) (2024, Hekate Records)
- "Prisoner" (with Alex Farell) (2024, Hekate Records)
- "Pressure" (2024, Hekate Records)
- "Havana Bounce" (with Alt8) (2025, Hekate Records)
- "GIRLBOSS" (2025, Insomniac Records)
- "Control Your Body" (with Shlømo) (2025, Taapion Records)

=== Remixes ===
- Cardi B featuring Megan Thee Stallion – WAP (Sara Landry remix) (2020)
- Indira Paganotto - Pressure (Indira Paganotto Remix) (2024)
- Le Sserafim - Celebration (Sara Landry remix) (2026)
