= Reinier Zonneveld =

Dutch DJ and record producer (born 1991)

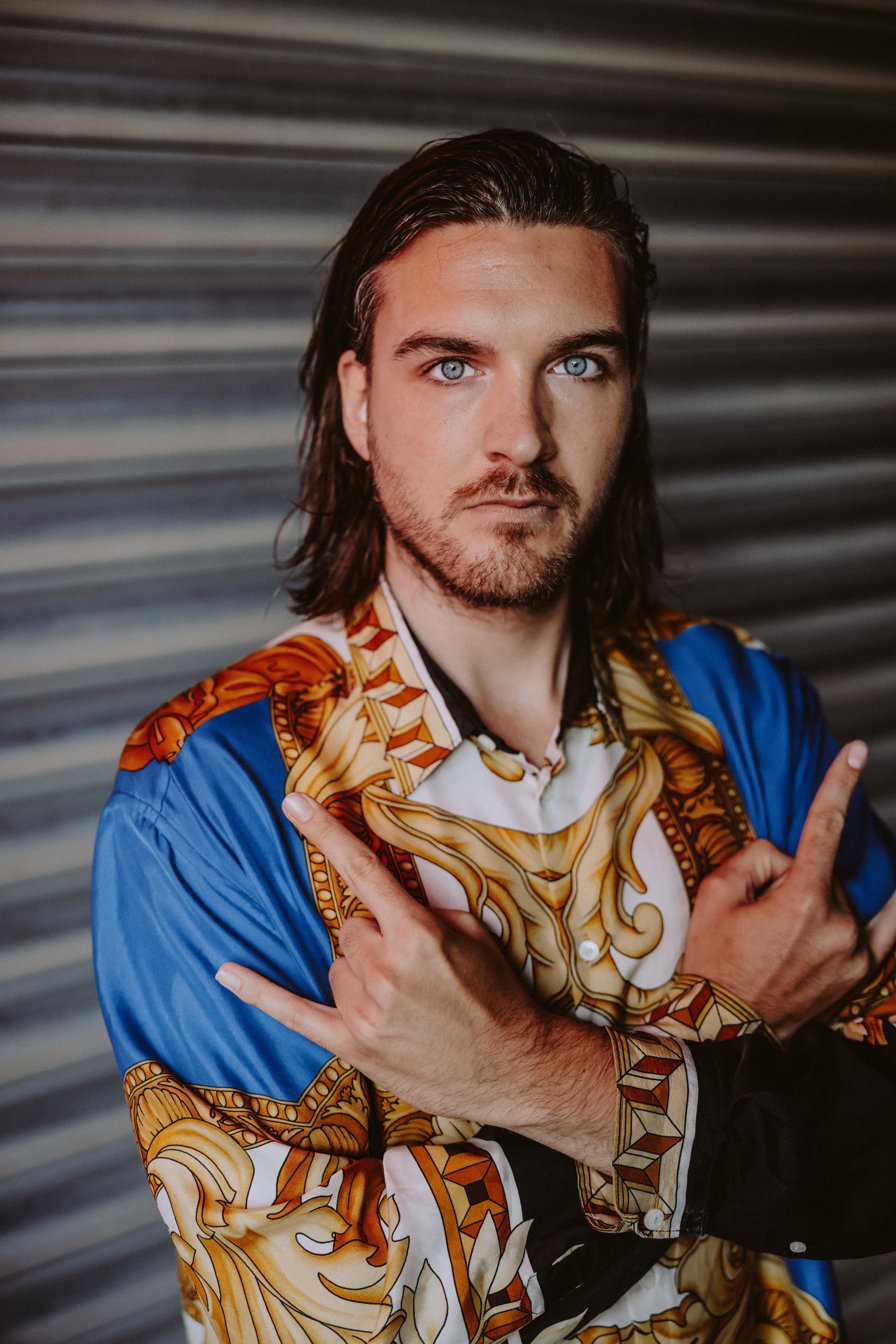
- Zonneveld in 2023

Background information
- Born: 30 January 1991 (age 35); Alphen aan den Rijn, Netherlands
- Genre: Deep house, electro, minimal, acid techno
- Occupations: DJ; record producer
- Years active: 2011–present

Reinier Zonneveld (born 30 January 1991) is a Dutch DJ and record producer. He mainly plays and produces acid techno and is the owner of the label Filth on Acid, founded in 2017. Zonneveld is best known for his live sets, where he brings his music to the stage using drum machines and synthesizers.

== Early life and education ==
Zonneveld was born in Alphen aan den Rijn on 30 January 1991, the son of a baker. He attended the Stedelijk Gymnasium in Leiden and then studied econometrics at the Erasmus University Rotterdam. There, after completing his bachelor's degree, he also completed two master's degrees in "corporate finance" and "real estate finance".

== Musical career ==
Zonneveld came into contact with classical music at an early age and has been playing the piano since he was three years old. During his studies, he came into contact with electronic dance music and techno at raves and then began experimenting with it himself. His debut release appeared on Oliver Koletzki's Stil vor Talent label.

Since 2016, Zonneveld has been performing in Dutch festivals and events such as Awakenings. In 2017 he founded his own label, Filth on Acid. His third album Church of Clubmusic was released in 2019.

He also holds the world record of the longest electronic music live set which is 11h and 11 mins performed on 05 August 2023 at his own Karren Maar festival in Arnhem.

In 2025, Zonneveld made his first appearance in DJ Mag’s Top 100 DJs poll, ranking at number 22.

== Musical style ==
Zonneveld's musical role models include the German band Kraftwerk, Dutch DJs Armin van Buuren and Speedy J, and Canadian DJ Richie Hawtin and British DJ Carl Cox. He organizes the "Karren Maar Festival" in Arnhem, where he also plays.

== Discography ==
=== Studio albums ===
- 2013: Reverse Psychology (Illegal Alien Records)
- 2016: Megacity Servant (Stil vor Talent)
- 2019: Church of Clubmusic (Filth on Acid)
- 2023: Heaven is Mad (for You) (Filth on Acid)

=== Charted singles ===
List of charted singles, showing year released, chart positions, certifications, and associated albums
Title	Year	Peak chart positions										Certifications	Album
Title	Year	BEL (FL)	BUL Air.	CIS Air.	EST Air.	GER Air.	ITA Air.	LAT Air.	LTU	POL Air.	UKR Air.	Certifications	Album
"Loco Loco" (with Gordo)	2026	32	10	65	47	47	42	18	7	2	1	ZPAV: Gold	Non-album single
