= Supervizion =

SUPERVIZION
- Company type: Private
- Industry: Management consulting
- Founded: 1986 (40 years ago)
- Area served: Worldwide
- Brands: Supervizion Advisory; Supervizion Creative; Supervizion Management
- Services: Accounting; Consulting Creative; Management
- Website: www.supervizion.com

Supervizion is a business consulting firm founded in 1986 that provide artist management, management consulting and creative services.

The firm is active in the music industry and other creative industries. Supervizion has been involved in record production within electronic dance music and rap music. Supervizion's creative work has been displayed during Fashion Week in Stockholm, the show was broadcast in northern Europe by the TV channel Star!.
