= Indira Paganotto =

Spanish DJ and record producer (born 1992)

- Born: 30 May 1992 (age 33); Las Palmas, Canary Islands, Spain
- Genres: Techno
- Occupations: DJ; Record producer
- Labels: KNTXT; Second State; Octopus Records; Artcore

Indira Paganotto (born 30 May 1992) is a Spanish techno DJ and record producer.

== Biography ==
Indira Paganotto was born in Las Palmas, Canary Islands on 30 May 1992. Paganotto, who grew up in Madrid, is the daughter of a DJ and began discovering her musical talent at the age of 16. Her sets, which she plays in international clubs, include elements from the 1990s and traces of psytrance and underground techno.

Since 2022, Paganotto has also been producing under her own label, Artcore. Previously, she had released records on well-known techno labels such as KNTXT, Second State, and Octopus Records. Paganotto released her EP Lions of God under KNTXT, Charlotte de Witte's label. In 2022, she performed twice at the Tomorrowland Festival, as well as in 2023 at Ikarus and Exit and in 2024 as a headliner at Airbeat One. In 2024, she released the EP Mantra with Joseph Capriati, which Faze magazine sees as a seal of approval for Paganotto's work.

== Discography ==
=== Albums ===
- 2018: The Imaginarium (Frequentza)
- 2021: Invisible Connections (Octopus Recordings)
- 2026: Arte Como Amante (Artcore, PIAS Electronique)

=== EPs ===
- 2017: Kashmir (Pooledmusic)
- 2021: Himalaya (KNTXT)
- 2022: Lions Of God (KNTXT)
- 2022: Guns & Horses (Artcore)
- 2024: Mantra (with Joseph Capriati, Artcore)

=== Single ===
- 2024: Dragon (with Armin van Buuren, Artcore/Armada Music)

== Awards and honors ==
- 2022: 3rd place in the FAZEmag annual poll in the "Breakthrough International" category“
- 2023: 97th place in DJ Mag's "Top 100 DJs 2023"
- 2023: 1st place in the FAZEmag annual poll in the "Breakthrough International" category
- 2024: 49th place in DJ Mag's "Top 100 DJs 2024"
