= Adam Beyer =

Swedish techno producer and DJ

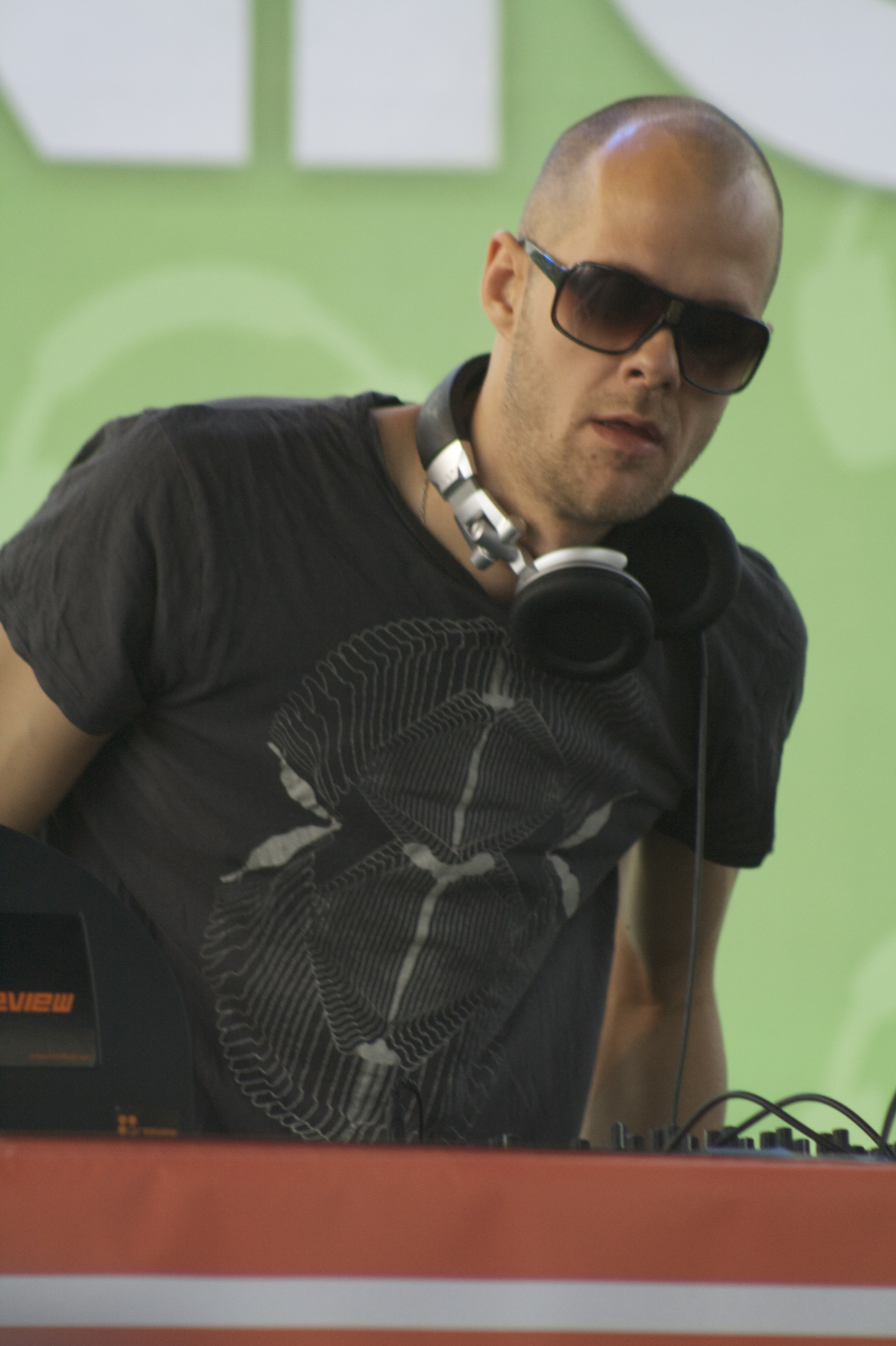
- Beyer in 2009

Background information
- Also known as: 17th, Jack Sell, 2 Bonk, Conceiled Project, Midas, Mould Impression, Martin Kliernert, Mr. Sliff, Tall Guy
- Born: Adam Thomas Beyer; 15 May 1976 (age 49); Stockholm, Sweden
- Genres: Trance, techno, gabber
- Occupations: Turntablism, record producer
- Years active: 1993–present
- Labels: Drumcode Records; Truesoul Records; Code Red Recordings; Mad Eye Recordings

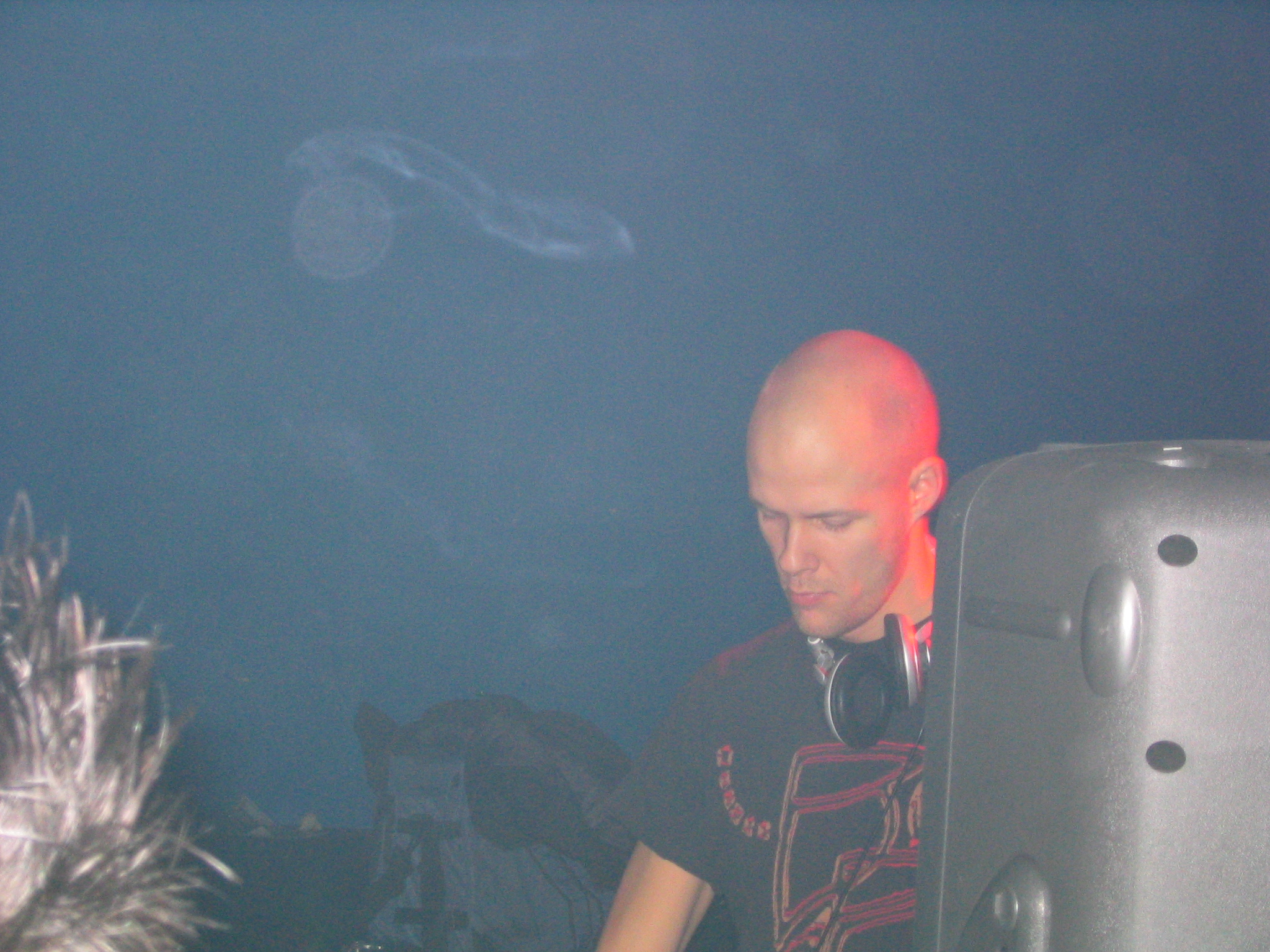
Beyer in 2003

Adam Thomas Beyer (born 15 May 1976 in Stockholm, Sweden) is a Swedish electronic dance music producer and DJ. Originally starting his musical journey in the techno scene, though over the last decade he has made a gradual shift towards playing more progressive EDM and Trance styles, which have been well received by newer fans at the larger music festivals he is playing.

He is the founder of Drumcode Records, and is one of several Swedish EDM artists to emerge in the mid-1990s, along with Cari Lekebusch and Jesper Dahlbäck. Beyer was married to fellow Swedish DJ Ida Engberg (now divorced), with whom he has three daughters. He also hosts a weekly radio show called Drumcode Live which has a weekly audience of 11 million, making it one of the most listened to weekly EDM broadcasts in the world.

== Discography ==
As an artist, Beyer has released four albums and a number of EPs, while also working as a producer and remixer.

=== Studio albums ===
- Decoded (1996)
- Recoded (1997)
- Protechtion (1999)
- Ignition Key (2002)
- Selected Works (1996-2000) (DC01-20 remastered)
- Fabric 22 (2005)

=== EPs, mixes and singles ===
- "Pump 1" (1996)
- Fabric 22 (2005)
- Fuse Presents Adam Beyer (2008)
- "London", (2009)
- "No Rain" (2011)
- "Flap" (2012)
- "Eye Contact" (2012)
- "Unanswered Question" (with Ida Engberg) (2013)
- "Teach Me" (2014)
- "Capsule" (with Pig&Dan) (2017)
- "Space Date" (with Layton Giordani & Green Velvet) (2018)
- "Your Mind" (with Bart Skils) (2018)
- "Data Point" (with Green Velvet & Layton Giordani) 2019

== DJ Magazine Top 100 DJs ==
Year	Position	Notes	Ref.
2003	65	New entry	
2004	50	Up 15	
2005	67	Down 17	
2006	134	Exit (down 67)	
2007	97	Re entry (up 37)	
2008	126	Exit (down 29)	
2009	130	Out (down 4)	
2010	181	Out (down 51)	
Hiatus
2017	118	Out	
2018	79	Re entry (up 39)	
2019	48	Up 31	
2020	48	No change	
2021	58	Down 10	
2022	51	Up 7	
2023	61	Down 10	
