= Sea Star Festival =

Summer music festival in Umag, Croatia

- Genre: Rock, pop, electronic, techno, house, hip-hop, metal and punk
- Dates: Two days, starting on the fourth Friday of May; 29–30 May 2026
- Locations: Umag, Croatia
- Years active: 2017–present
- Attendance: 44,000
- Website: seastarfestival.com

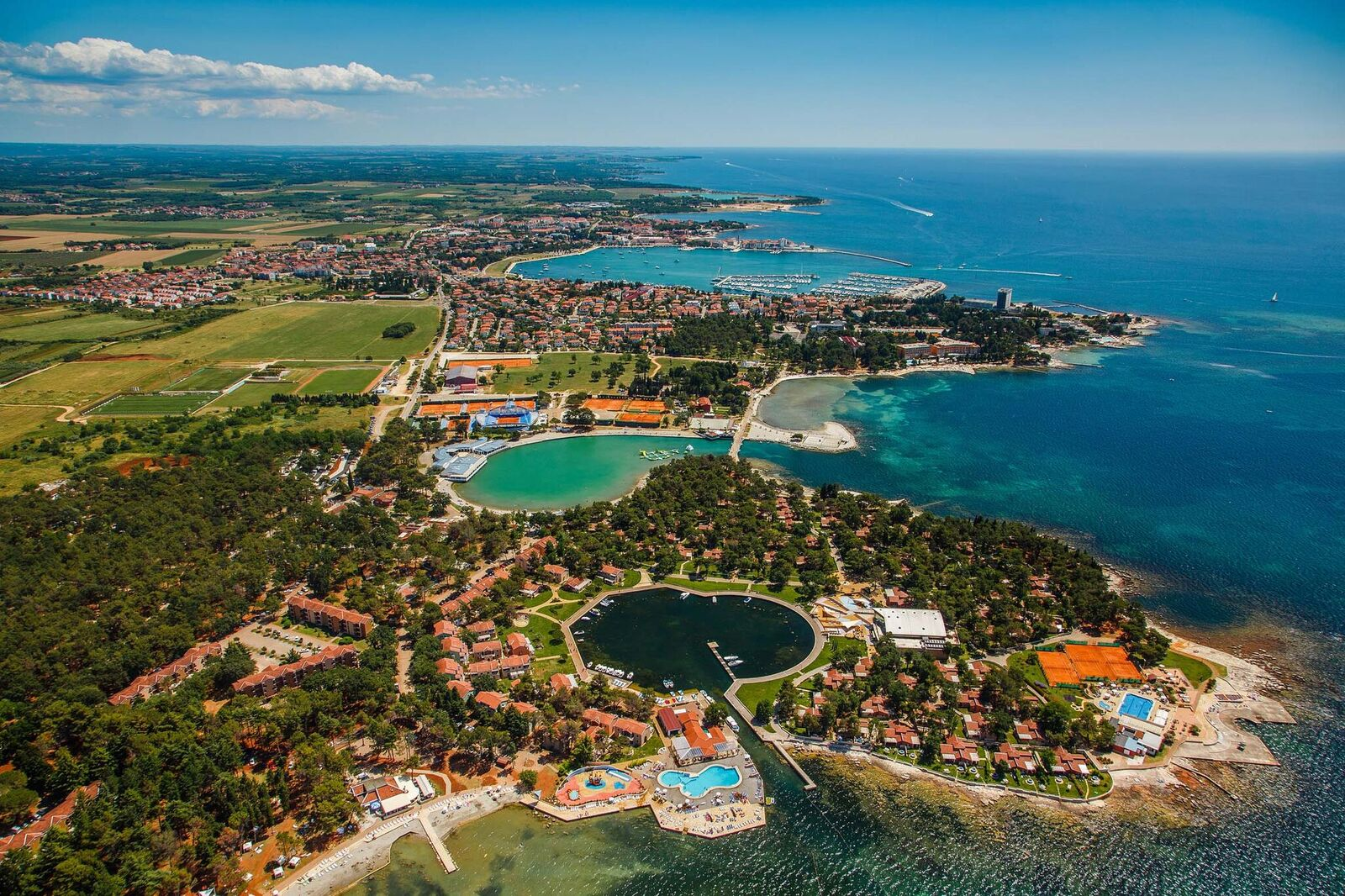
Stella Maris Resort with the ATP stadium visible in the background

Sea Star Festival (Serbo-Croatian: Si Star festival / Си Стар фестивал) is a music festival an extension of EXIT Festival. It was held for the first time on 26–27 May 2017 at the Stella Maris Resort in the City of Umag, while the second edition was held in 2018 on 25–26 May. The festival features rock, pop, electronic, techno, house, hip-hop, metal and punk acts performing on multiple stages. Some notable names who performed include Fatboy Slim, Paul Kalkbrenner, Dimitri Vegas & Like Mike, Hurts, Paul Van Dyk, Sven Väth, Wu-Tang Clan, Dubioza kolektiv, Amelie Lens, UMEK, Meduza, Onyx, The Prodigy, Robin Schulz, Boris Brejcha, Xzibit, Holy Priest and many more.

In its first festival year in 2017, Sea Star was shortlisted in two categories at the annual European Festivals Awards which are held in Groningen, Netherlands, competing for the title of best mid-sized and best new festival. At national level, in 2017 Sea Star won the Capra D’Oro award given by Istria Tourist Board for promoting the region of Istra, while winning the "Ambasador" award in the same year for best new festival. Sea Star also caught the attention of international media, with Travel Magazine concluding that with "outstanding productions the festival is set to be a stunner".

== Location ==
Sea Star's Festival site is the ATP stadium and its surroundings, located in the Stella Maris Resort Complex on the Istrian peninsula at the north of the Croatian coast.

The festival's geographic proximity to Slovenia means it attracts a large number of attendees from the neighboring country every year.

== Key stages ==
Sea Star festival has organized multiple different stages during its editions. The Tesla Main Stage presents the headliners of the festival, while Nautilus Arena, located under the main ATP stadium, serves as the festival's secondary stage and normally hosts an alternative genre to what is played on the mainstage.

Other stages over the years have included Electric Waves, Beach Groove Stage, Exotic Laguna and Silent Octopus. These stages hosted a variety of genres such as hip-hop, reggae, Latino, bass, house, techno. Cinema Stage boasted a huge screen where movies and best EXIT performances were shown in HD.

== History by years ==
=== Sea Star 2017 ===
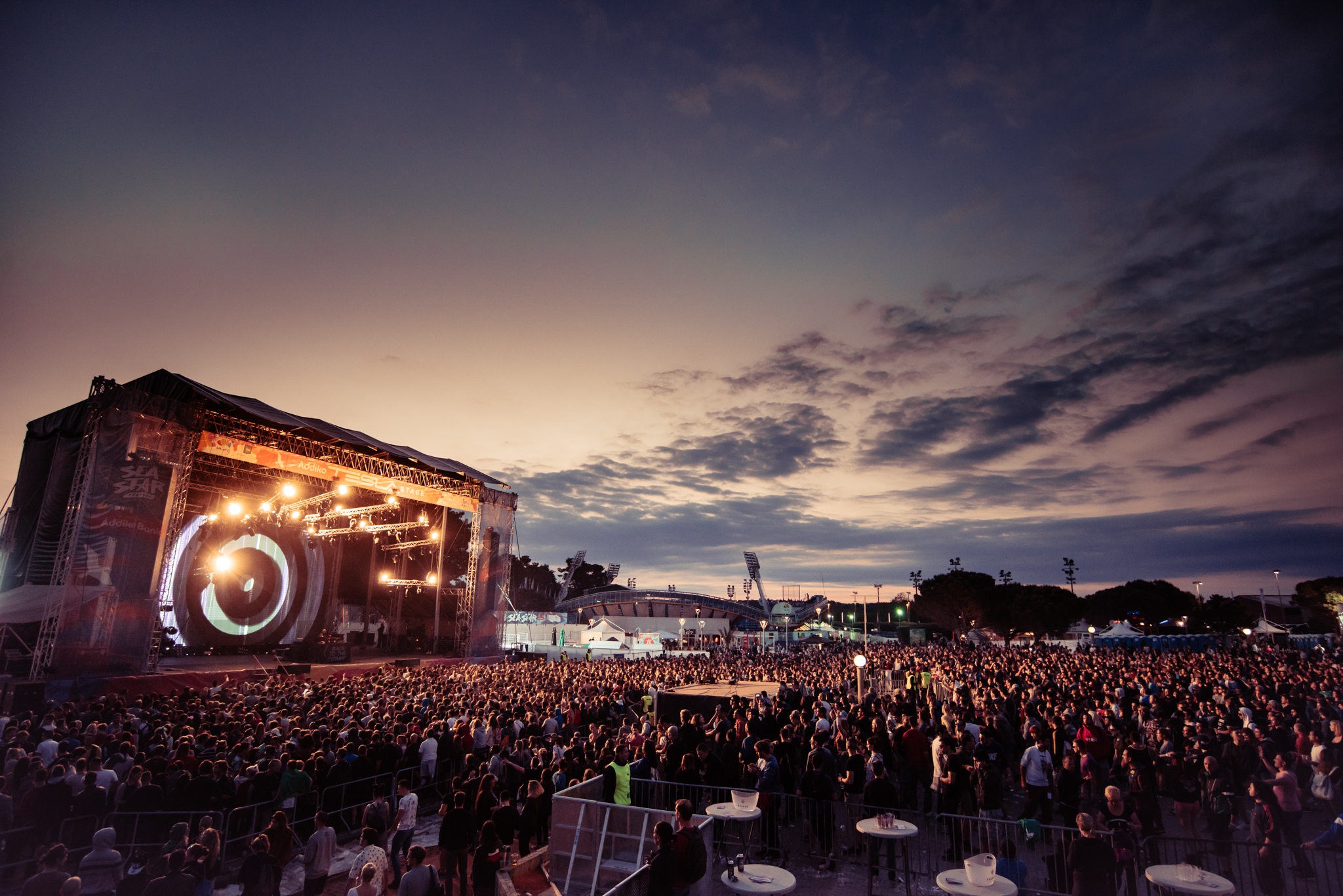
Paul Kalkbrenner at Sea Star Festival 2017

Sea Star Festival 2017 took place 26–27 May 2017 and was attended by 50,000 people. Although it was planned to be a two-day festival, Day Zero was held on 25 May, as well as an after-party on 28 May 2017.

The headlining acts for Sea Star 2017 included The Prodigy, Paul Kalkbrenner, Fatboy Slim, Dubioza kolektiv, Mahmut Orhan, Modestep LIVE, Pendulum DJ Set, Rambo Amadeus, SARS, Spiller, UMEK, Bad Copy, Urban&4, Elemental, Pips, Chips & Videoclips and Matter.

Sea Star festival presented a combination of various live and electronic acts, ranging from famous big beat and techno acts to acid house music, as well as rock and pop. Around 70 acts performed at the festival.

It was one of four festivals of EXIT Summer of Love 2017. EXIT Summer of Love celebrated the 50th anniversary of the Summer of Love and marked the most important events from 1967 when the revolutionary Peace Movement began. Besides Sea Star Festival, it included three more music festivals – Revolution Festival in Romania on 2–3 June 2017, EXIT Festival in Serbia on 6–9 July 2017 and Sea Dance Festival in Montenegro on 13–15 July 2017.

=== Sea Star 2018 ===
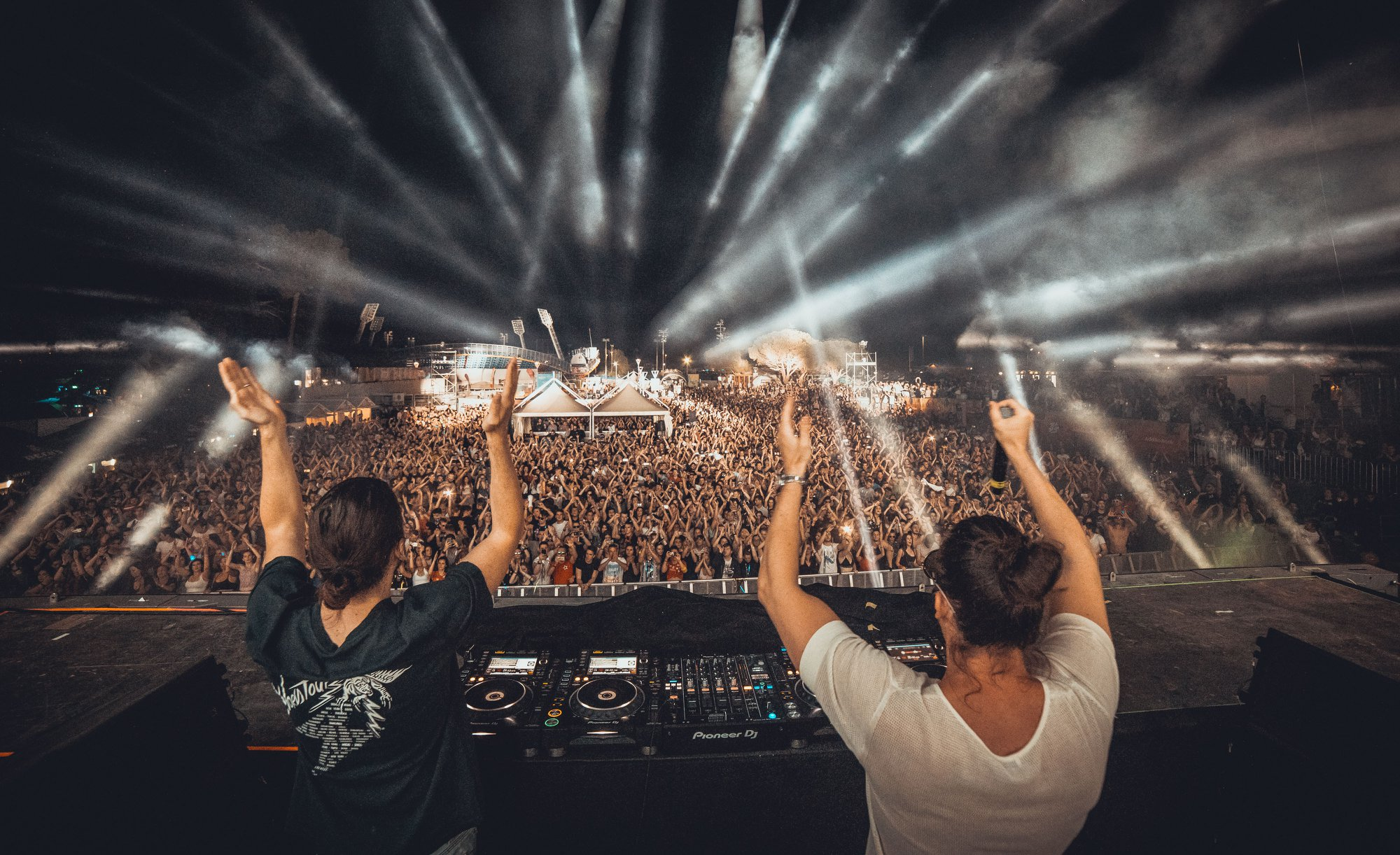
Dimitri Vegas & Like Mike at Sea Star Festival 2018

Sea Star Festival 2018 took place 25–26 May 2018. It was attended by 35,000 people.

The headlining acts for Sea Star 2018 included Dimitri Vegas & Like Mike, Hurts, Robin Schulz and Paul Van Dyk as well as Luke Slater, Ofenbach, Tram 11, Filatov & Karas and Edo Maajka & Bend.

Sea Star festival presented a combination of various live and electronic acts, ranging from famous house and pop acts to trance music.

Disciples have canceled their performance prior to the festival. Instead, they have performed at the 2018 edition of the EXIT Festival.

Sea Star is one of the six festivals of EXIT Freedom 2018. Besides Sea Star, EXIT Freedom includes six more music festivals – Festival 84 in Bosnia and Herzegovina on 15–18 March 2018, Revolution Festival in Romania on 31 May–2 June 2018, EXIT Festival in Serbia on 12–15 July 2018, Sea Dance Festival in Montenegro on 30 August–1 September and No Sleep Festival in Serbia on 15–18 November 2018.

=== Sea Star 2019 ===
Sea Star Festival 2019 took place 24–25 May 2019. It was attended by 40,000 people.

The headlining acts for Sea Star 2019 included Wu-Tang Clan, and Sven Väth.

Sea Star Festival 2019 presented a combination of various live and electronic acts, ranging from famous hip hop acts to techno and house music.

Sea Star was the first of the five festivals of EXIT Tribe 2019. Besides Sea Star, EXIT Tribe included four more music festivals – EXIT Festival in Serbia on 4–7 July 2019, Revolution Festival in Romania on 8–10 August 2019, Sea Dance Festival in Montenegro from 31 August to 1 September 2019 and No Sleep Festival in Serbia from 8–9 November 2019.

=== Sea Star 2020 ===
Sea Star Festival 2020 was supposed to take place 22–23 May 2020 until its cancellation and postponement to 2021, due to the COVID-19 pandemic.

Organizers of the festival announced that all of the acts announced for Sea Star 2020 would be performing at the 2021 edition of the festival.

=== Sea Star 2021 ===
Sea Star Festival 2021 was supposed to take place 28–29 May 2021 until its cancellation and postponement to 2022, due to the COVID-19 pandemic.

Organizers of the festival announced that all of the acts announced for Sea Star 2021 would be performing at the 2022 edition of the festival.

=== Sea Star 2022 ===
Sea Star Festival 2022 took place 27–28 May 2022. It was attended by 40,000 people.

The headlining acts for Sea Star 2022 included Onyx, Meduza, Amelie Lens, Dubioza Kolektiv and UMEK .

Sea Star 2022 presented a combination of various live and electronic acts, ranging from famous hip-hop, techno and rock acts to electronica and house music.

It was the second of the five festivals organized by the EXIT group. Besides Sea Star, EXIT included four more music festivals - No Sleep Festival in Serbia on 8–9 April and 11–12 November, EXIT Festival in Serbia on 7–10 July, respectively and Sea Dance Festival in Croatia on 27–29 August and Ada Divine Awakening Festival in Montenegro on 13–18 September.

=== Sea Star 2023 ===
Sea Star Festival 2023 took place 19–20 May 2023. It was attended by 42,000 people.

The headlining acts for Sea Star 2023 included The Prodigy and Robin Schulz.

Sea Star 2023 presented a combination of various live and electronic acts, ranging from famous hip-hop and electronic acts to psychedelic trance and dance music.

It was first of the five festivals organized by the EXIT group. Besides Sea Star, EXIT included four more music festivals - EXIT Festival in Serbia on 6–9 July, Ada Divine Awakening Festival in Montenegro on 18–20 August, Sea Dance Festival in Croatia on 15–20 September, and No Sleep Festival in Serbia on 11 November.

=== Sea Star 2024 ===
Sea Star Festival 2024 took place 24–25 May 2024.

The headlining acts for Sea Star 2024 included Hot Since 82, John Newman, Ofenbach, Baby Lasagna and Angelina Mango.

Sea Star 2024 presented a combination of various live and electronic acts, ranging from famous dance and electronic acts to pop and techno music.

It was the first of the four festivals organized by the EXIT group. Besides Sea Star, EXIT included three more music festivals - EXIT Festival in Serbia on 10–14 July, Ada Divine Awakening Festival in Montenegro on 13–18 September, and No Sleep Festival in Serbia on 16 November.

=== Sea Star 2025 ===
Sea Star Festival 2025 took place 23–24 May 2025.

The headlining acts for Sea Star 2025 included Indira Paganotto, Loreen, Lost Frequencies, Tommy Cash and I Hate Models.

The festival announced I Hate Models canceled his performance last minute, citing a sudden illness.

Sea Star 2025 presented a combination of various live and electronic acts, ranging from techno and EDM acts to pop music.

It was the first of the four festivals organized by the EXIT group. Besides Sea Star, EXIT will include three more music festivals - EXIT Festival in Serbia on 10–13 July, Ada Divine Awakening Festival in Montenegro on 13–18 September, and No Sleep Festival in Serbia in November.

=== Sea Star 2026 ===
Sea Star Festival 2026 took place 29–30 May 2026.

The headlining acts for Sea Star 2026 included Boris Brejcha, Xzibit feat. Furnace Band, Holy Priest and KI/KI.

It was the first of the festivals organized by the EXIT group during its 2026 "Global Tour" year.

Following comments made by EXIT chief, there has been speculation that the 2026 edition will have been the last in the festival's current form. As of the festival taking place, there has been no official confirmation.

== Festival by year ==
Year	Dates	Attendance	Headliners	Notable acts
2017	26–27 May	50,000	The Prodigy · Paul Kalkbrenner · Fatboy Slim	Dubioza kolektiv, Mahmut Orhan, Modestep, Pendulum, Rambo Amadeus, SARS, Spiller, Umek, Bad Copy, Pips, Chips & Videoclips
2018	25–26 May	35,000	Dimitri Vegas & Like Mike · Hurts · Robin Schulz · Paul Van Dyk	Filatov & Karas, Luke Slater, Ofenbach, Tram 11, Edo Maajka & Bend
2019	24–25 May	40,000	Wu-Tang Clan · Nina Kraviz · Sven Väth · IAMDDB	Hladno Pivo, Bajaga i Instruktori, Mahmut Orhan, DJ Jock, Frenkie
2020 (canceled)	22–23 May	N/A	Cypress Hill · Amelie Lens · Dubioza Kolektiv · Meduza · UMEK	Buč Kesidi
2021 (canceled)	28–29 May	N/A	Cypress Hill · Amelie Lens · Dubioza Kolektiv · Meduza · UMEK	Buč Kesidi
2022	27–28 May	40,000	Cypress Hill (canceled) · Iggy Azalea (canceled) · Onyx · Meduza · Amelie Lens · Dubioza Kolektiv · UMEK	Kalush Orchestra, Konstrakta, Senidah, Topic, Buč Kesidi, Stole, Smoke Mardeljano & Phat Phillie
2023	19–20 May	42,000	The Prodigy · Robin Schulz	Mahmut Orhan, Indira Paganotto, Senidah, Grše, Hiljson Mandela, Nika Turković
2024	24–25 May	44,000	Artbat · Hot Since 82 · John Newman · Ofenbach · Baby Lasagna · Angelina Mango	Buč Kesidi, Joker Out, Devito, Senidah, Victoria, Grše
2025	23–24 May	44,000	Indira Paganotto · Loreen · Lost Frequencies · Tommy Cash · I Hate Models (canceled)	Grše (canceled), Marčelo, Miach, Senidah, Voyage
2026	29–30 May	TBD	Boris Brejcha · Xzibit feat. Furnace Band · KI/KI · Holy Priest	Grše, Hiljson Mandela

== See also ==
- List of electronic music festivals
- Live electronic music
