= Festival 84 =

- Dates: Three days, starting on the third Friday of March; 15–17 March 2019 (cancelled)
- Locations: Jahorina Mountain, Bosnia and Herzegovina
- Years active: 2018
- Website: festival84.com

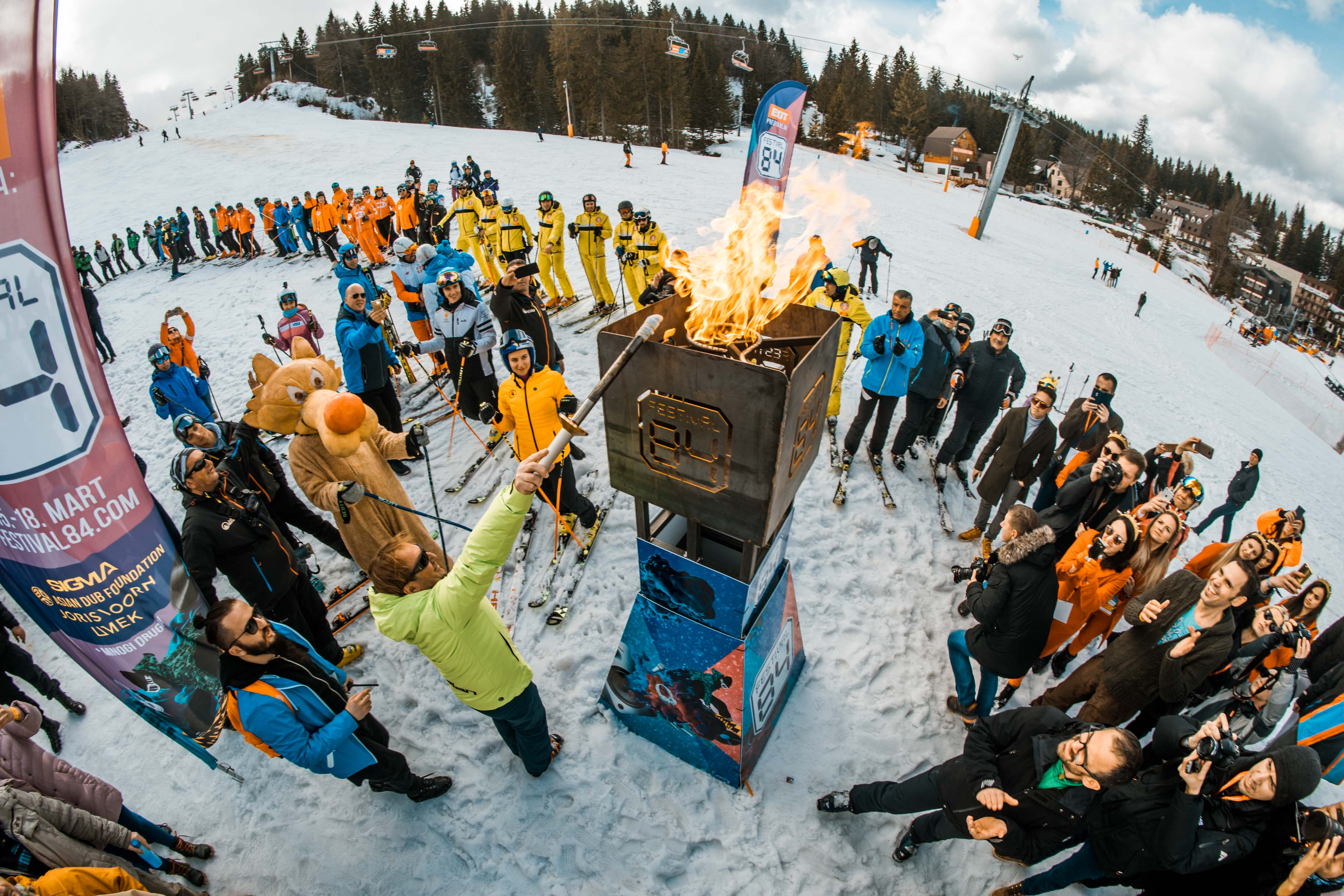
Opening Ceremony at Festival 84 2018

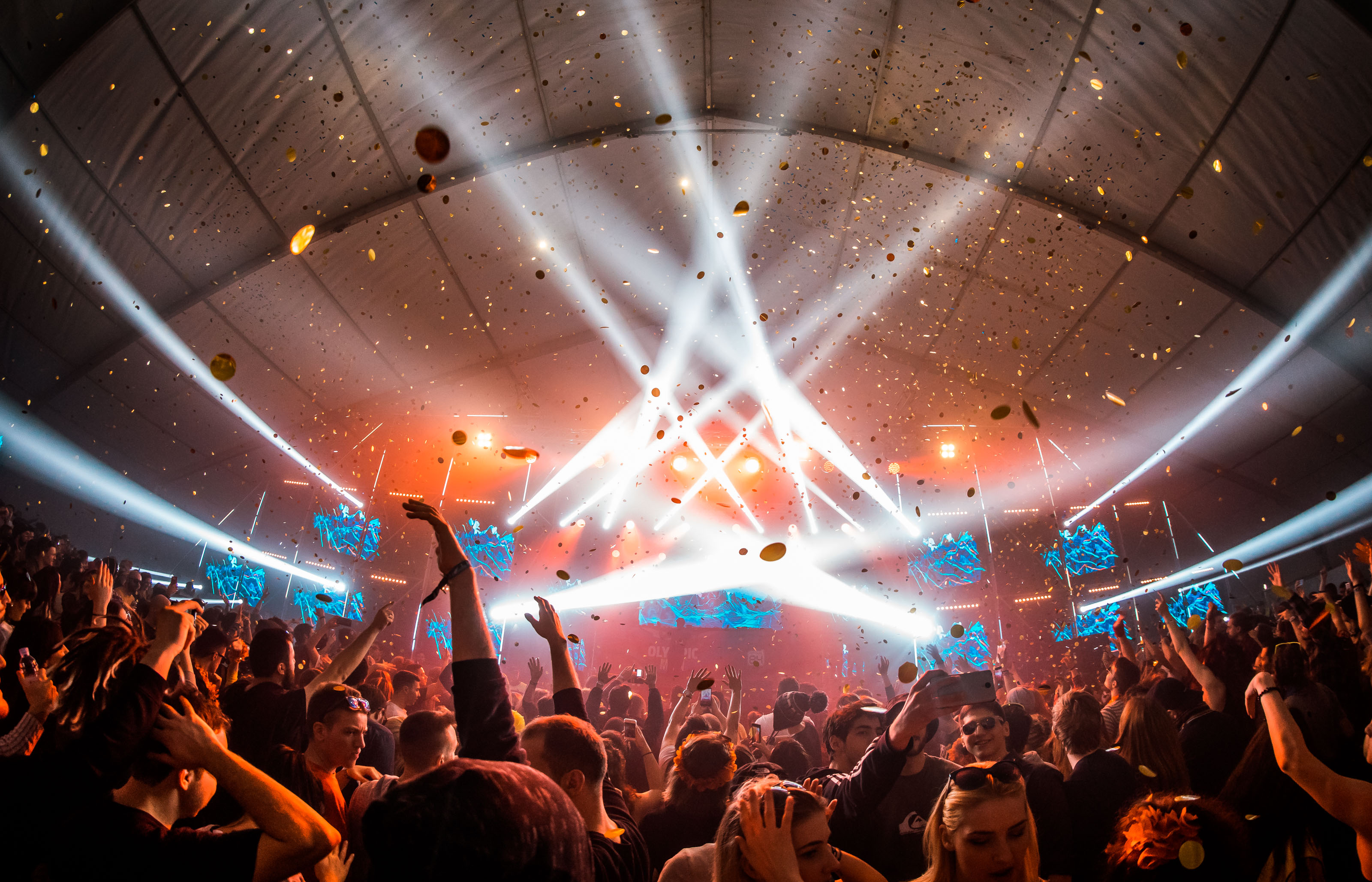
Olympic Main Stage

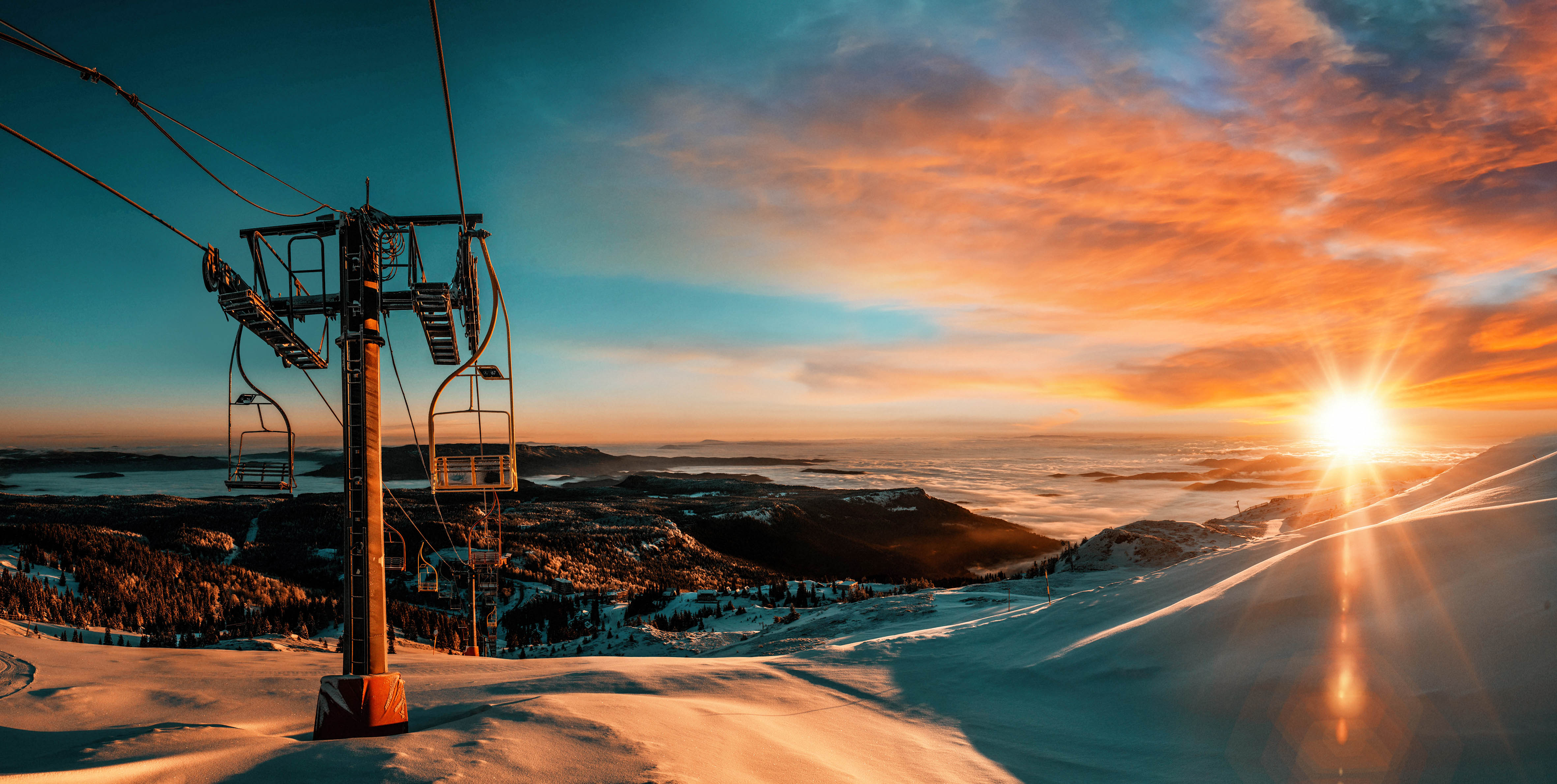
Jahorina mountain 2018

Festival 84 (Serbo-Croatian: Festival 84 / Фестивал 84) was a music festival organized by the team behind EXIT festival in Serbia. Its debut edition was held on 15–18 March 2018 at the site of Jahorina Ski Resort, on Jahorina Mountain in Bosnia and Herzegovina, with the attendance of 20,000 people. It was cancelled on 14 February 2019, due to the administrative reasons beyond the organizers' control.

In 1984, Jahorina mountain was the home of the 14th Winter Olympic Games, thus inspiring the name of Festival 84, both as an homage to the location and to the Olympic ideas of peace and tolerance, seeing how the festival gathered numerous festivalgoers from the Balkan region.

Festival 84 was organized by EXIT team, which also organizes five more festivals: Revolution Festival in Romania, Sea Star Festival in Croatia, EXIT Festival in Serbia, Sea Dance Festival in Montenegro and No Sleep Festival in Serbia.

== Key Stages ==
Festival 84 had five stages in total. Olympic Main Stage presented the headliners of the festival during the nights, while Vučko Main Daily Stage hosted daily performers. Stages named Addiko Jump Stage and Switch Stage brought day parties and Super G Afterparty Stage was reserved for afterparties.

== History by years ==
=== Festival 84 2018 ===
The premiere edition of Festival 84 was held on 15-18 March 2018.

The festival had both daytime and night events, following the 2+2 formula which was used for the Sea Star Festival in Croatia. On the first day, the festival had an opening event; on 16-17 March it was open in full capacity during both day and night, while the fourth day was reserved for a farewell party. The headlining acts for Festival 84 2018 included Sigma, Asian Dub Foundation, Joris Voorn, Umek, Burak Yeter, Filatov & Karas, Mahmut Orhan, Bad Copy, Van Gogh and many more. As many as 40 world and regional artists performed at five music stages at the site of the festival.

It was the first among six festivals of EXIT Freedom 2018, which also included Revolution Festival in Romania, Sea Star Festival in Croatia, EXIT Festival in Serbia, Sea Dance Festival in Montenegro and No Sleep Festival in Serbia.

=== Festival 84 2019 ===
In February 2019 it was announced that Festival 84 won't be taking place in March, due to "administrative reasons".

It was supposed to be held on 15-17 March 2019.

== Festival by year ==
Year	Dates	Attendance	Headliners	Notable acts
2018	15-18 March	20,000	Sigma, Asian Dub Foundation, Joris Voorn, Umek	Burak Yeter, Filatov & Karas, Mahmut Orhan, Bad Copy, Van Gogh

== See also ==
- List of electronic music festivals
- Live electronic music
