= Life Festival =

Irish electronic music festival

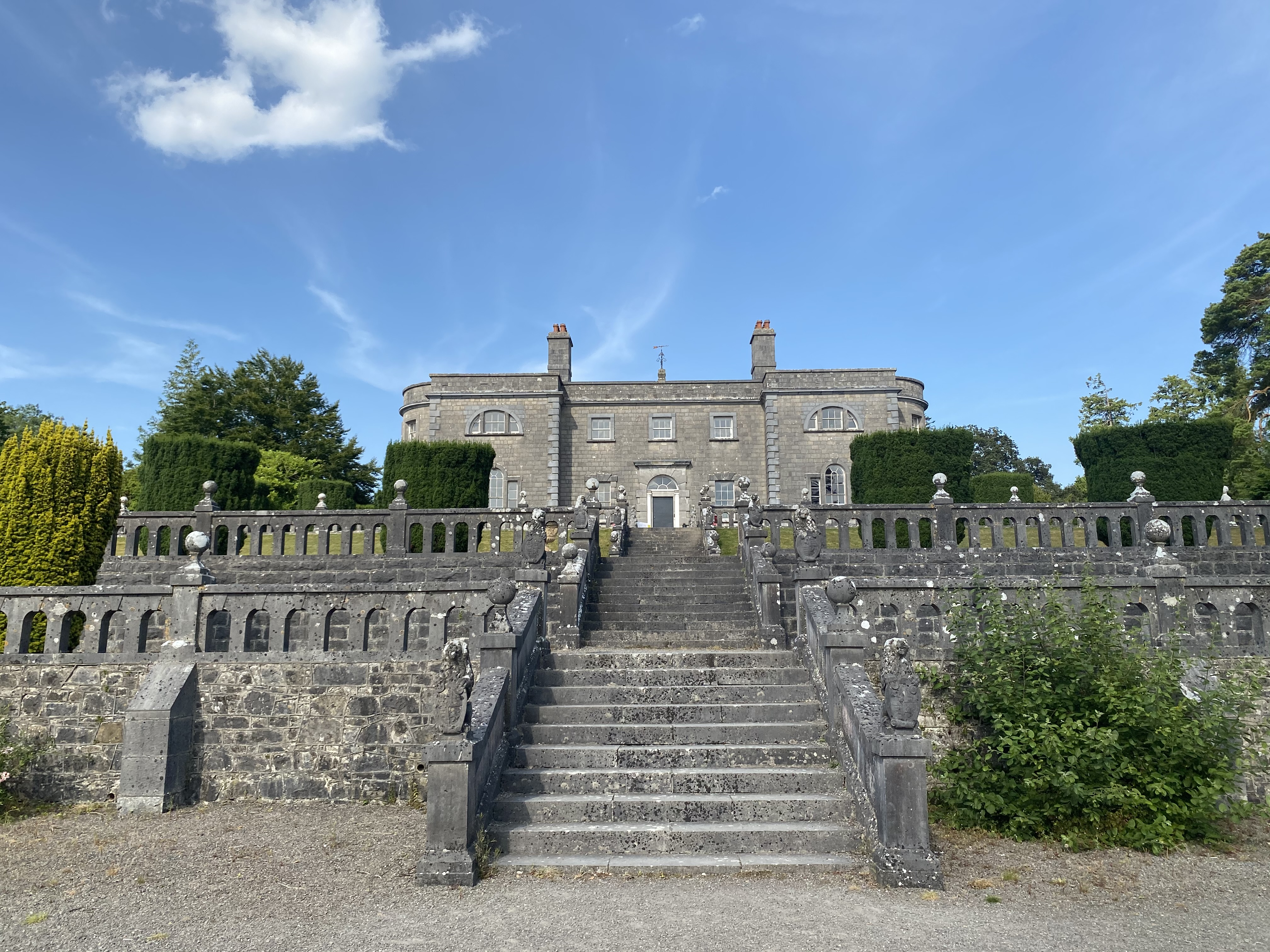
- Belvedere House
- Genre: Music festival
- Dates: Last weekend in May
- Locations: Belvedere House, Westmeath, Ireland
- Years active: 2006 to 2024
- Founders: Fernando Martin
- Website: www.life-festival.com

Life Festival is an annual Irish music festival held in Belvedere House and Gardens in Westmeath, Ireland which began in 2006. Throughout its lifespan, it has been associated with electronic music.

== History ==
Life Festival began at Charleville Castle in County Offaly in 2006, attracting around 500 people. In 2007 and 2008 it moved to Lough Cutra Castle near Gort in County Galway, where capacity rose to about 2 000. In 2009 the festival relocated to Ballinlough Castle for the 16–19 July weekend, with £125 weekend tickets selling out on 14 July. From 29–31 May 2010 it found a new home at Belvedere House, Park and Gardens in Mullingar, County Westmeath, and has remained there ever since. Tickets for the 2011 edition went on sale on 12 January, with that festival running from 27–29 May, followed by editions on 25–27 May 2012 and 24–26 May 2013. On 17 February 2013 director Fernando Martin confirmed that, despite rumours, the venue would continue to be Belvedere House, Park and Gardens.

The festival did not run in 2024 or 2025. The festival had faced complaints from local residents concerning noise and from councillors concerned about recurring drug-related arrests.

== Line-ups ==
After relocating to Belvedere House in 2010, Life Festival became one of focused on showcasing a mix of International and Irish electronic music artists. The early Belvedere editions featured artists such as Infected Mushroom, Ricardo Villalobos, Richie Hawtin, and John Digweed, with genres ranging from psytrance to techno and drum & bass. As the festival evolved, it expanded its musical offering to include electro, house, and experimental live acts. Between 2013 and 2015, names like Laurent Garnier, Four Tet, Jamie xx, and Maya Jane Coles appeared. By 2017 and 2018, the festival attracted acts like Nina Kraviz, Solomun, Bicep, and Diplo, alongside Irish artists such as Boots & Kats.

In 2019, Life Festival delivered a line-up with Charlotte de Witte, I Hate Models, Paula Temple, Sam Paganini, Giggs, DJ Seinfeld, Marcel Fengler, La Fleur, and Unknown T. After a two-year pause due to COVID-19, the festival returned in 2022 with a renewed focus on uplifting house and trance, featuring artists such as BLK., LSDXOXO, VTSS, Hector Oaks, Kettama, Tommy Holohan, Floorplan, Cailín, Efa O’Neill, Yasmin Gardezi, Aeron XTC, Pagan, Shampain, and Obskür. The lineup also included a wide range of rising Irish talent, including Kaycee, Sonia, Ricky Chong, Maedbh O’Connor, Siofra, Chantel Kavanagh, Mercorn, Shona Brophy, and MADN.

== Awards ==
- Best Irish Dance Festival in the first Irish Festival Awards in 2007 and 2009.
- Nominated for the top 10 Small Festivals in the European Festival Awards 2009.
- Best Dance Festival in Ireland (2007-2009-2010-2011-2012).
- Top 10 Best Small Festivals of Europe (2010)
- RA Top 10 Festivals May (2010-2011-2012).

== See also ==
- List of electronic music festivals
