= Sea Dance Festival =

Summer music festival, held in Malinska

- Sea Dance Festival view from Dance Paradise stage
- Dates: Four days, starting on the last Friday of August (2018–2023; 2026–present); Thursday after EXIT Festival (2014–2017)
- Locations: Bečići Beach, Budva, Montenegro (2026–present); Malinska, Krk, Croatia (2023); Buljarica Beach, Budva, Montenegro (2018–2022); Jaz Beach, Budva, Montenegro (2014–2017)
- Years active: 2014–2023; 2026–present
- Attendance: 40,000 (2022)
- Capacity: c. 21,000
- Website: www.seadancefestival.me

Sea Dance Festival (Serbo-Croatian: Si dens festival / Си денс фестивал) is a summer music festival. It has been held at Jaz Beach in Budva since 2014 until 2017, as an extension of EXIT Festival, and then at Buljarica Beach in Montenegro until 2022. In May 2023, the organizers announced the festival's displacement from Montenegro, because of the blockades and lack of financial support from the local government, with several potential future locations announced. Croatia was revealed as the location in June 2023. After a three-year hiatus, the festival organizers have announced the return of the festival to its hometown of Budva in 2026, at the Bečići beach.

Just after its first edition, Sea Dance Festival was officially proclaimed as the 'Best Medium Sized European festival' at the European Festivals Awards, held in Groningen in January 2015. Following the recognition at the European Festival Awards, Sea Dance Festival teamed up with London-based media company AEI and its global brands UKF and TheSoundYouNeed for the second edition of the festival.

In short time, Sea Dance garnered international media attention, featuring an article in Forbes magazine that listed Sea Dance Festival, together with EXIT Festival in Top 10 Europe's Summer Festivals. At the national level, Sea Dance festival won Montenegro Wild beauty Award for the event with greatest promotional effect for Montenegro.

== Location ==
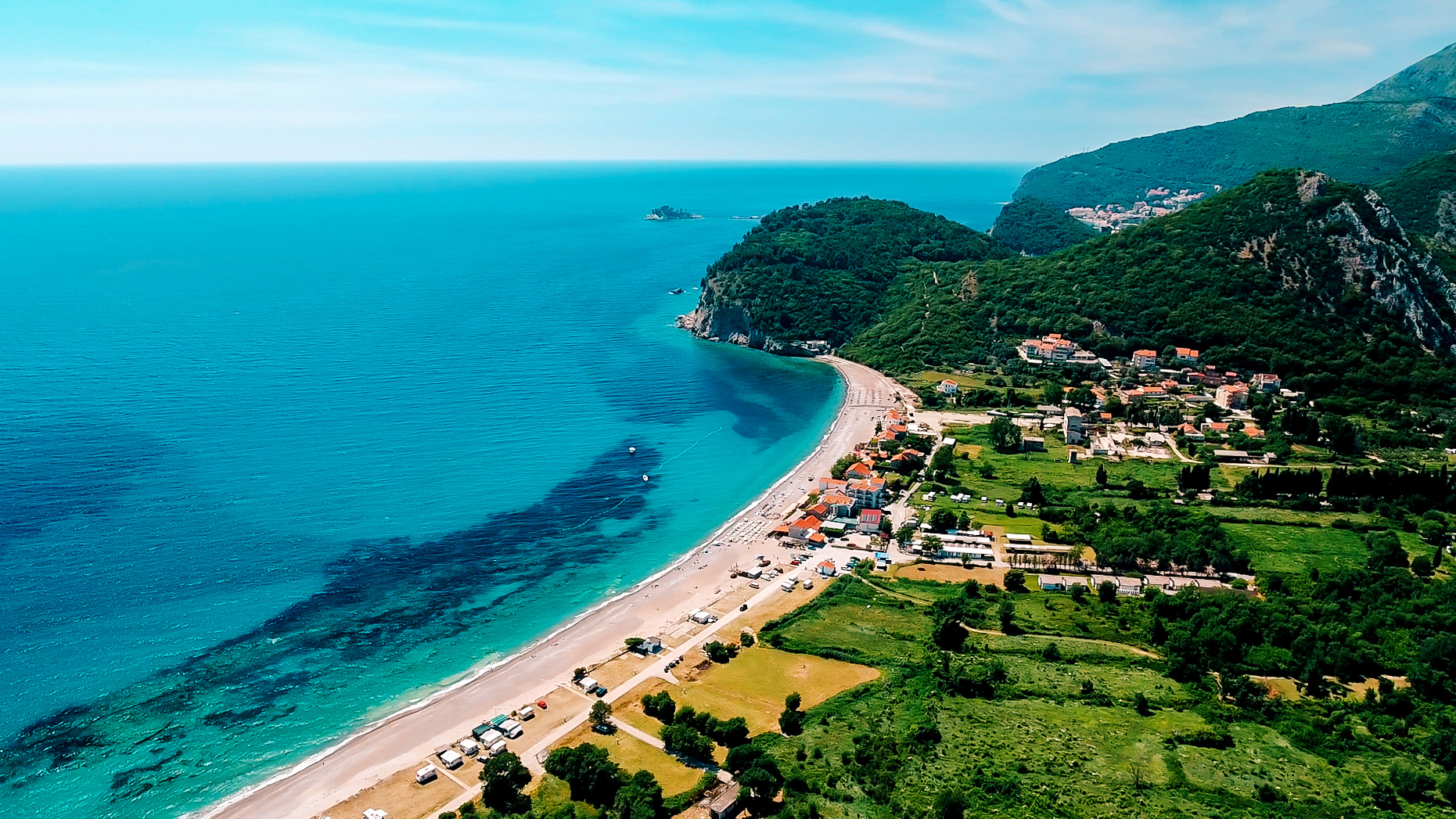
Buljarica Beach

Malinska is a settlement located on the island of Krk, the largest island in Croatia, as well as the most populous island in the Adriatic Sea.

== Key stages ==
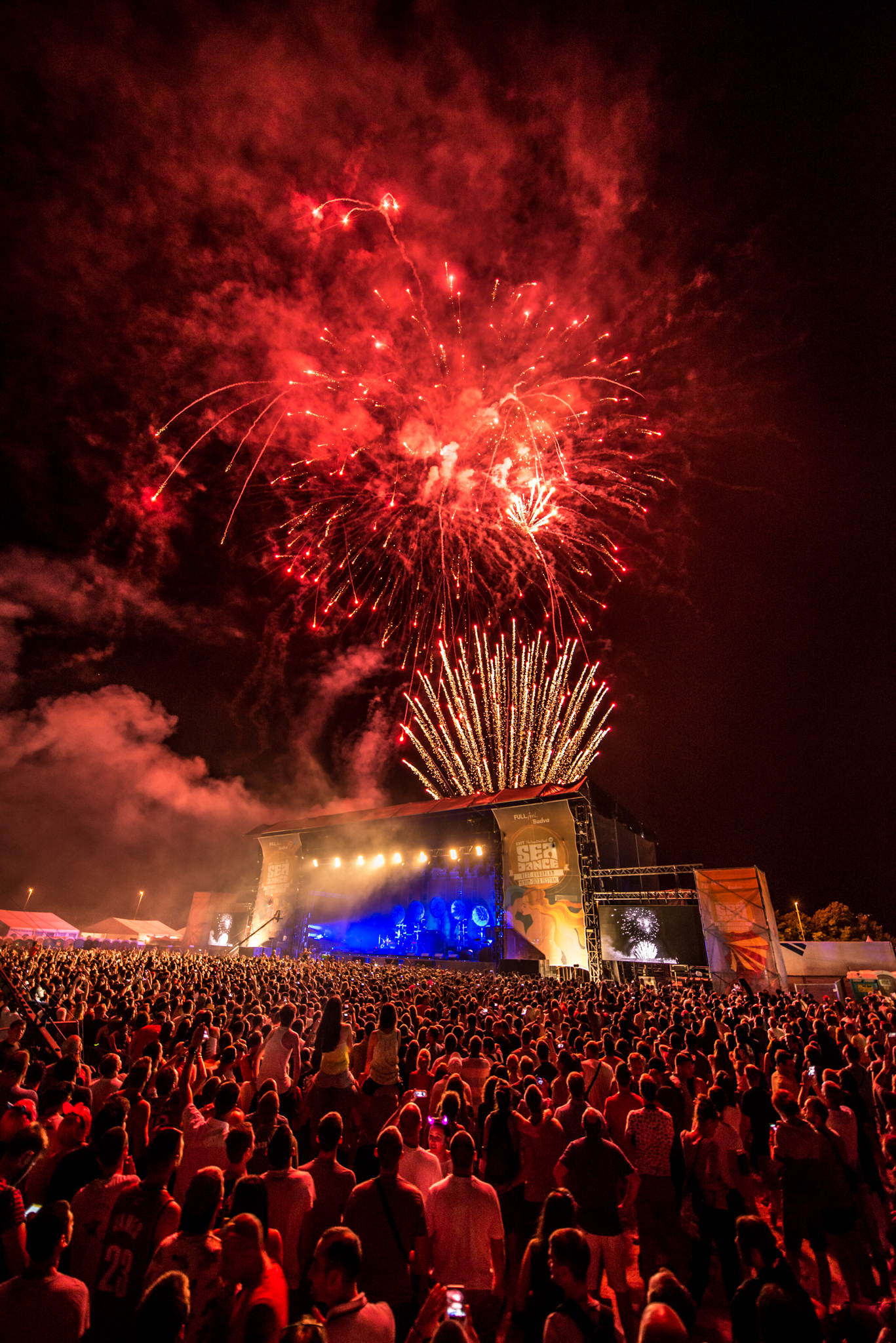
Main Stage

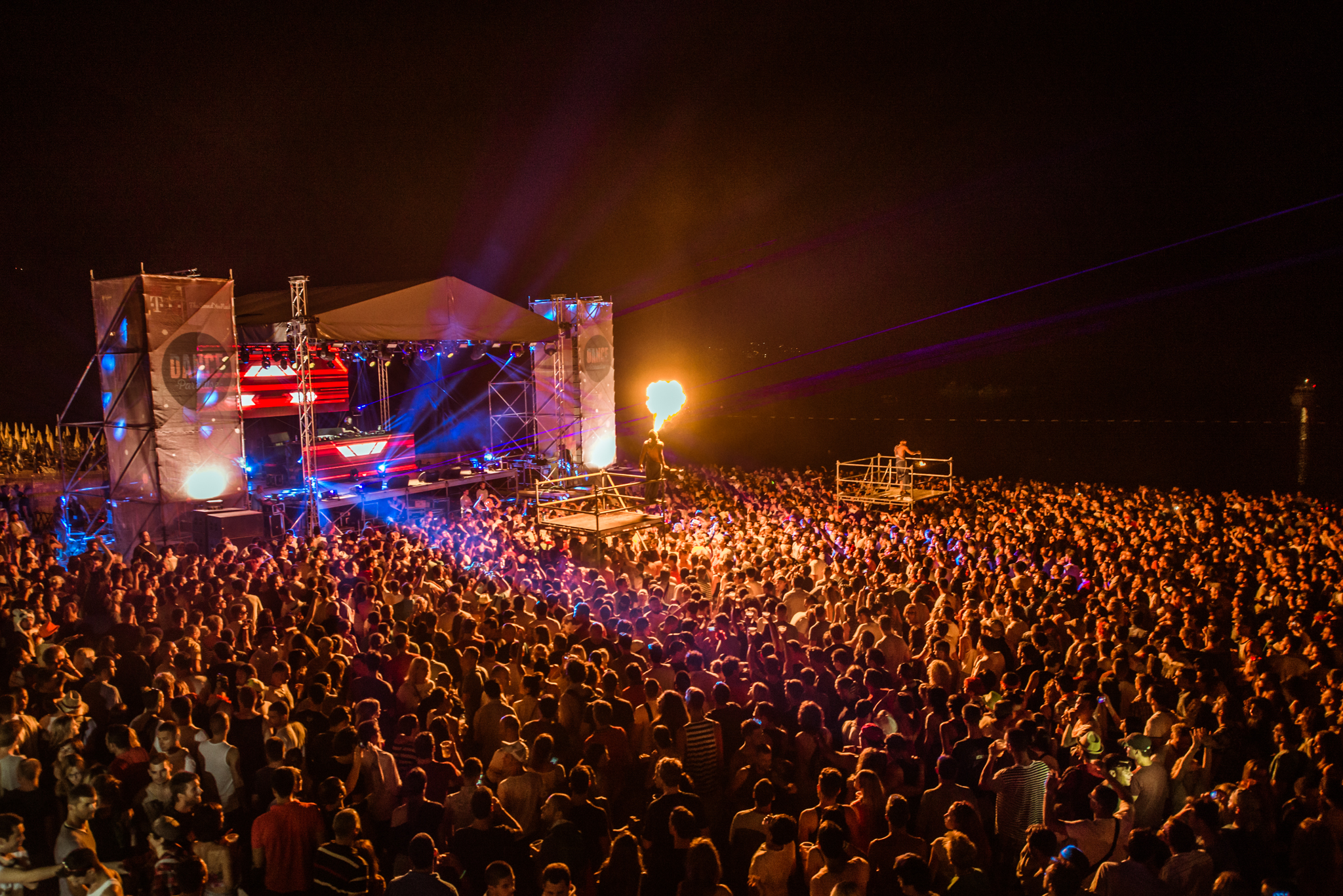
Dance Paradise Stage

The key stages of the festival include the Main stage with its 30,000 attendee capacity, No Sleep Stage, Reggae Stage, Silent Dance, Latino Stage, Cinema, and CHILL Zone. Dance Paradise Stage was replaced with the No Sleep Stage in 2017.

== History by years ==
=== Sea Dance 2014 ===
The first Sea Dance Festival was held from 15 to 17 July 2014 at the Jaz Beach in Budva, and represented 3 days of music performances. The festival was part of the EXIT Adventure, representing an additional 3 days of EXIT Festival. First edition of the festival visited 80 thousand people, making it one of the most visited events in Montenegro.

Be Human Charity Events

The EXIT Foundation's EXIT AID program, designed to help those affected by the devastating floods in Serbia, Bosnia, and Croatia organised the VIP humanitarian part of Sea Dance Festival entitled "BE HUMAN!"

The event was a collaborative effort between the EXIT Foundation and the municipality of Budva, and Dukley Gardens, with the support from the Government of the Republic of Serbia and Government of Montenegro as well as the National Tourist Organisation of Montenegro and Tourist Organisation of Budva.

Be Human featured music stars Jamiroquai and Example and took place at Dukley Gardens during Sea Dance Festival. Entrance was only available to GOLD and PLATINUM VIP ticket holders.

All profits made from GOLD and PLATINUM VIP ticket sales for Sea Dance Festival went to floodrelief efforts in Serbia, Bosnia, and Croatia. The total sum of aid collected by the Municipality of Budva and EXIT AID, counting BE HUMAN events, is over 140 000EUR in funds and 80 000EUR worth of goods. The collected aid was distributed to flood relief efforts as coordinated by the Government of the Republic of Serbia.

=== Sea Dance 2015 ===
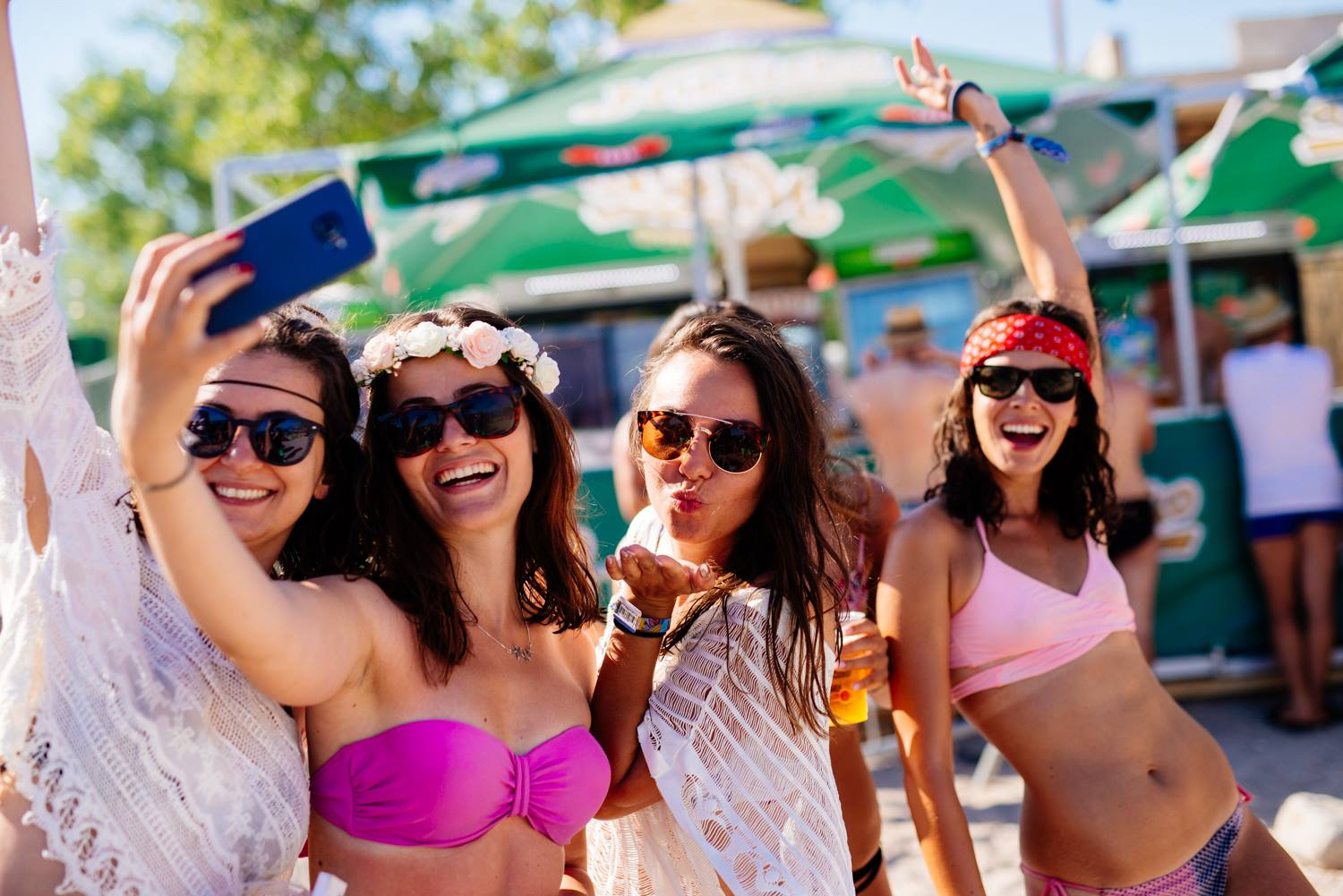
Crowd at Sea Dance

Second edition of Sea Dance festival was held from 15 to 18 July 2015 on Jaz Beach, with headlining acts such as The Prodigy, as well as Rudimental and Roisin Murphy.

The appearance of this year's festival was modified in comparison to previous year, and had six outdoor stages, that offered various music genres. Sea Dance Festival also increased the number of foreign visitors for 70% in comparison to the previous year, with people from more than 40 countries of the world passing through the festival gates. It also set a record in overall attendance around 110,000 people were present at Jaz Beach.

The festival site also included a camping place, located 50 meters away from the Jaz Beach, which sits next to the Main stage.

In 2015 Main Stage hosted stars and artists from various music genres, including: The Prodigy, Rudimental, Sigma, Wilkinson, Róisín Murphy, Noisia, Brookes Brothers, Black Sun Empire, Fred V & Grafix, Calyx, TeeBee, Maduk, Dubioza Kolektiv.

Dance Paradise Stage hosted: Bondax, Flight Facilities, Gramatik, Odesza, Star Slinger, TCTS, Soul Clap, PillowTalk, James Zabiela, Kim Ann Foxman and.

=== Sea Dance 2016 ===
Sea Dance 2016 was held 14–16 July 2016. In 2015 Main Stage hosted stars and artists such as: Skrillex, Hurts, Lost Frequencies, Stereo MCs, Andy C, Banco de Gaia, Sub Focus, Goldie, Zomboy, Cartoon, Filatov & Karas, S.A.R.S., Who See and many more.

Dance Paradise Stage hosted: Jeff Mills, Sister Bliss, Black Coffee and many more.

Due to rain, overall attendance was 75,000 people in three days.

=== Sea Dance 2017 ===
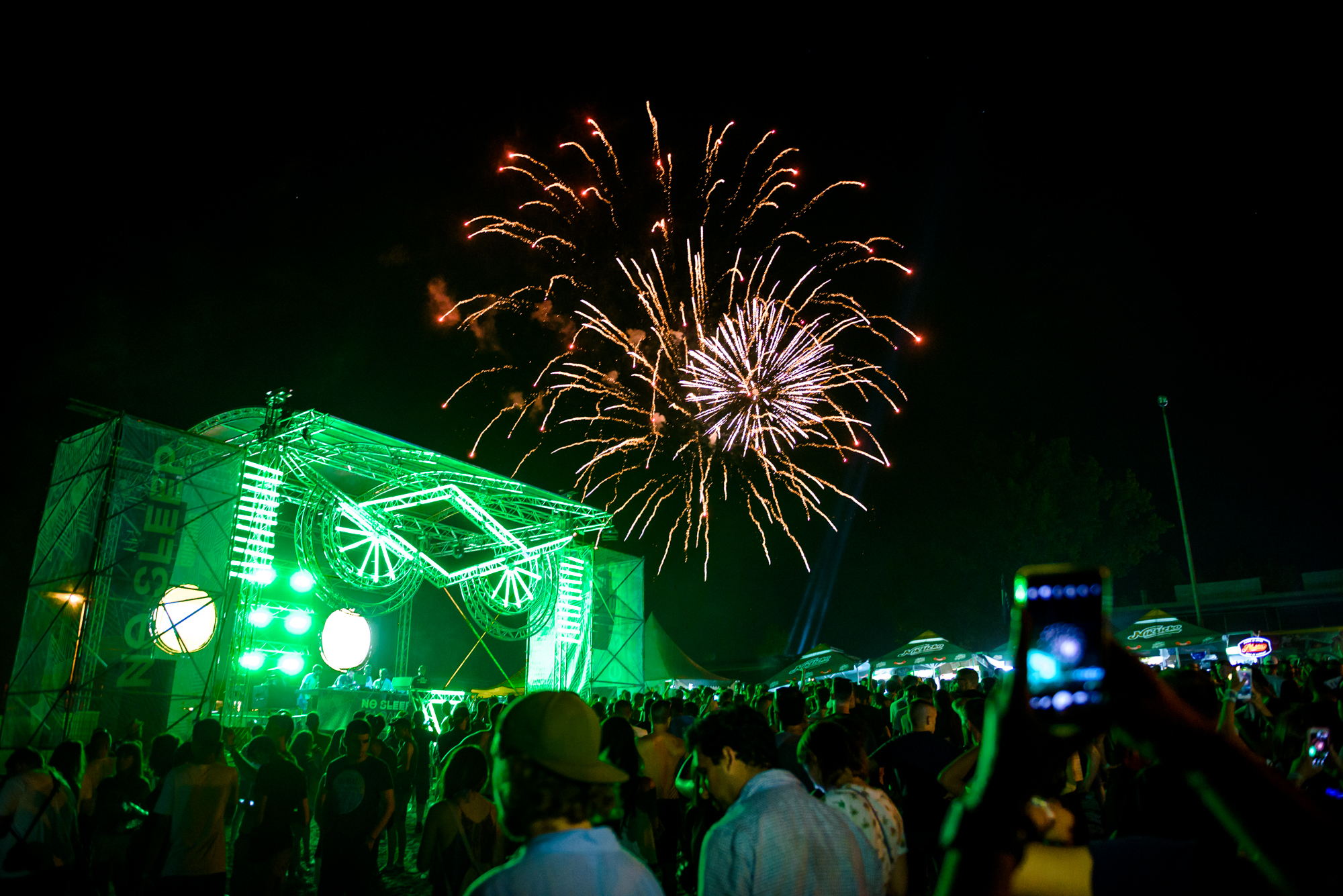
No Sleep at Sea Dance Festival 2017

Sea Dance Festival took place 13–15 July 2017. The headlining acts for Sea Dance 2017 included Sean Paul, John Newman, Fatboy Slim, Mahmut Orhan and many more. Sea Dance 2017 featured No Sleep Stage instead of Dance Paradise Stage.

The overall attendance was 65,000 people in three days.

=== Sea Dance 2018 ===
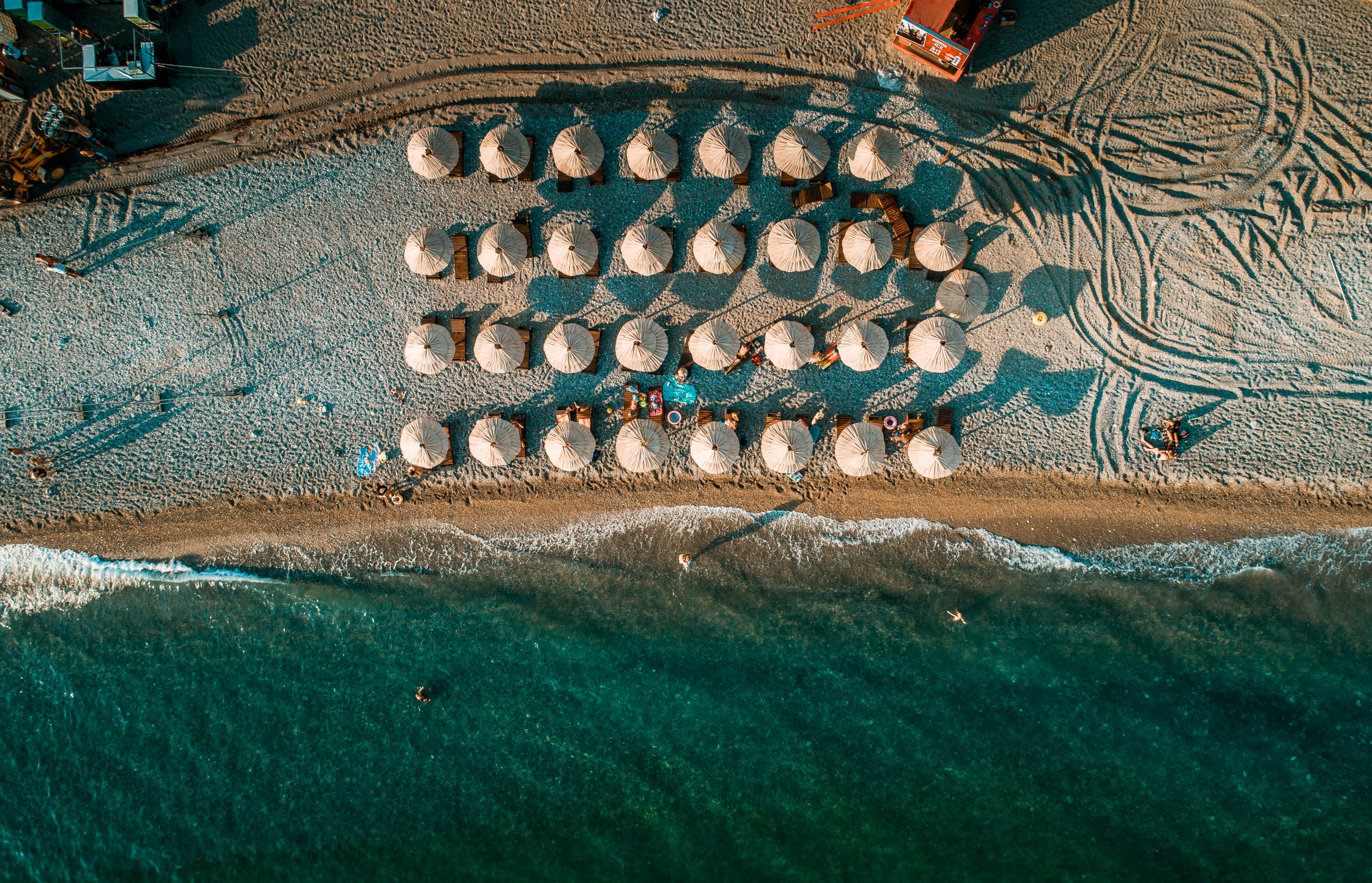
Sea Dance Festival's location 2018

Sea Dance Festival took place 30 August–1 September. It was the first time the location of the festival has been changed, moving from Jaz Beach to Buljarica Beach in Budva.

The headlining acts for Sea Dance 2018 included Chic, Dimitri Vegas & Like Mike, Paul Kalkbrenner, Alice Merton, as well as Bajaga i Instruktori, Bassivity Showcase, Burak Yeter, Filatov & Karas, Hladno Pivo, Lost Frequencies, Rambo Amadeus, Van Gogh and many more.

The overall attendance was 47,000 people in three days.

=== Sea Dance 2019 ===
Sea Dance Festival took place 30 August–1 September.

The headlining acts for Sea Dance 2019 included David Guetta, Sven Väth, Richie Hawtin, Robin Schulz and many more.

The overall attendance was 63,000 people in three days.

=== Sea Dance 2020 ===
Sea Dance Festival was supposed to take place 28–30 August, until its postponement to August 2021 due to the 2019/20 COVID-19 pandemic.

The headlining acts for Sea Dance 2020 were supposed to include Martin Garrix and many more.

=== Sea Dance 2021 ===
Sea Dance Festival took place 26–29 August, with the 28 August program moved to the next day, due to the weather circumstances.

The headlining acts for Sea Dance 2021 included Boris Brejcha, Maceo Plex, Meduza, Tale Of Us, Topic and many more.

The overall attendance was 22,000 people in three days.

=== Sea Dance 2022 ===
Sea Dance Festival took place 26–28 August.

The headlining acts for Sea Dance 2022 included Dubioza Kolektiv, Konstrakta, Mahmut Orhan, Senidah, Shouse and many more.

The overall attendance was 40,000 people in three days.

=== Sea Dance 2023 ===
Sea Dance Festival took place 17–19 August. It was the first time Sea Dance Festival was held outside of Montenegro since its relocation to Croatia in June 2023.

The headlining acts for Sea Dance 2023 included Alok, Willy William, Fedde Le Grand and many more.

=== Sea Dance 2026 ===
Sea Dance Festival will take place 28–31 August. It will mark its return to Montenegro from Croatia, after a three-year hiatus.

The headlining acts for Sea Dance 2026 will include Boris Brejcha, Charlotte de Witte, Hugel, and many more.

== Festival by year ==
Year	Dates	Attendance	Headliners	Notable acts
2014	15–17 July	80,000	Jamiroquai; Underworld; Example	Bad Copy, Darkwood Dub, Juan Atkins, Klingande, Rambo Amadeus, Roger Sanchez, Timo Maas, Eyesburn, Lollobrigida, Tara McDonald, Who See
2015	15–18 July	110,000	The Prodigy; Róisín Murphy; Rudimental	Sigma, Wilkinson, Noisia, James Zabiela, Bondax, Calyx, Teebee, Dubioza kolektiv, Flight Facilities, Gramatik, Odesza, Snakeships, Soul Clap, Who See
2016	14–16 July	75,000	Skrillex; Hurts	Andy C, Banco de Gaia, Black Coffee, Jeff Mills, Lost Frequencies, Sister Bliss, Stereo MCs, Sub Focus, Zomboy, Filatov & Karas, Goldie, SARS, Shy FX, Stamina MC, Who See
2017	13–15 July	65,000	Sean Paul; John Newman; Fatboy Slim	Mahmut Orhan, Amelie Lens, Atheist Rap (cancelled), Bad Copy, Slobodan Trkulja, Who See
2018	30 August–1 September	47,000	Chic; Dimitri Vegas & Like Mike; Nina Kraviz; Paul Kalkbrenner; Alice Merton	Bajaga i Instruktori, Burak Yeter, Filatov & Karas, Hladno Pivo, Lost Frequencies, Rambo Amadeus, Van Gogh, Who See
2019	30 August–1 September	63,000	David Guetta; Sven Väth; Richie Hawtin; Robin Schulz	Ofenbach, Disciples, Helena Hauff, Recondite, Eelke Kleijn, Darko Rundek & Ekipa, Senidah, Who See
2020 (cancelled)	28–30 August	N/A	Martin Garrix	N/A
2021	26, 27, 29 August	22,000	Meduza; Maceo Plex; Tale Of Us; Boris Brejcha; Senidah; Topic	Bajaga i Instruktori, Who See
2022	26–28 August	40,000	Anfisa Letyago; Dubioza Kolektiv; Kalush Orchestra (cancelled); Konstrakta; Mahmut Orhan; Nina Kraviz; Senidah; Shouse	Who See
2023	17–19 August	N/A	Alok; Willy William; Fedde Le Grand; Artbat (cancelled); Indira Paganotto (cancelled); Senidah (cancelled); Van Gogh (cancelled)	N/A
2026	28–31 August	93,000	Boris Brejcha, Charlotte de Witte, Hugel, Peggy Gou (cancelled), Dara, John Newman, Burak Yeter	Marcel Dettmann, Who See vs Bad Copy, Voyage

== See also ==
- List of electronic music festivals
- Live electronic music
