= Revolution Festival =

Romanian music festival

- Genre: Drum and bass, House, Metal, Rock, Dubstep, Punk, Blues, Trip hop, Electronica
- Dates: Three days, starting on the second Thursday of August (2019); Last Thursday of May (2015–2018)
- Locations: Timișoara, Romania (2015–2019)
- Coordinates: 45.7787°N 21.2658°E
- Years active: 2015–2019
- Founders: Dušan Kovačević, Ivan Milivojev
- Attendance: 25,000 (2018)
- Website: revolutionfestival.com

Revolution (Romanian: Revolușn) was a summer music festival which is held in the city of Timișoara, Romania.

The festival was founded in 2015 in Timișoara as a part of the EXIT Festival's EXIT Adventure package, which also contained EXIT and Sea Dance Festivals. The first edition of the festival was held from 30 to 31 May in Timișoara, and it attracted 12,000 visitors.

== History ==
The festival began in 2015 as a part of the EXIT Festival's EXIT Adventure package. During its existence, Revolution has been visited by over 76,000 people from more than 30 countries. DJ Fresh, Dubioza Kolektiv, DJ Marky, Eyesburn, Modestep and many others have on numerous occasions praised Revolution.

== Location ==
Revolution took place on three stages in Timișoara, with some of the world's most popular music acts, alongside local talents.

== History by years ==
=== Revolution 2015 ===
The inaugural installment of Revolution took place 30–31 May. It was attended by 12,000 people.

The headlining acts for Revolution 2015 included Noisia, DJ Fresh, Sabaton and many more.

Revolution Festival presented a combination of various live and electronic acts, ranging from famous drum and bass and house acts to metal and rock music.

=== Revolution 2016 ===
Revolution 2016 took place 1–3 June. It was attended by 19,000 people.

The headlining acts for Revolution 2016 included Juliette and the Licks, Skunk Anansie, John Digweed, Maxim, Suicidal Tendencies and many more.

Revolution Festival presented a combination of various live and electronic acts, ranging from famous rock and metal acts to house, big beat and punk music.

=== Revolution 2017 ===
Revolution 2017 took place 3–4 June. It was attended by 20,000 people.

The headlining act for Revolution 2017 included Rudimental, Sigala, Eluveitie, LTJ Bukem, Dubioza Kolektiv, Dubfire and many more.

Revolution Festival presented a combination of various live and electronic acts, ranging from famous drum and bass and house acts to metal, hardcore, rock and techno music.

=== Revolution 2018 ===
Revolution 2018 took place 31 May–1 June. It was attended by 25,000 people.

The headlining acts for Revolution 2018 included Gogol Bordello, Dub FX, Wilkinson and many more.

Revolution Festival presented a combination of various live and electronic acts, ranging from famous rock and dub acts to drum and bass and big beat music.

=== Revolution 2019 ===
Revolution 2019 took in August for the first time. It lasted from 8 to 10 August The number of attendees is yet to be released.

The headlining acts for Revolution 2019 included Kosheen, Unkle and many more.

Revolution Festival presented a combination of various live and electronic acts, ranging from famous trip hop acts to electronica music.

== Key Venues ==
=== Music Guru ===
Music Guru stage was the festival's main venue. It mainly hosted electronic acts, and has hosted some of the most influential DJs and producers in the world, such as Noisia, DJ Fresh, Modestep, DJ Marky, Stamina MC, John Digweed, Maxim, Rudimental, Sigala, LTJ Bukem, Dubfire, Dub FX, Wilkinson, Kosheen, Unkle and many more.

=== Electric Apex ===
Electric Apex stage was focused on hosting local and regional electronic artists.

=== XTreme Zone ===
XTreme Zone was a stage which mainly hosts rock and metal acts, and has hosted some of the most influential bands in the region and world, such as Sabaton, Dubioza Kolektiv, Eyesburn, Partibrejkers, Juliette and the Licks, Skunk Anansie, Suicidal Tendencies, Gogol Bordello, Eluveitie and many more.

== Festival by year ==
Year	Dates	Attendance	Headliners	Notable acts
2015	30-31 May	12,000	Noisia · DJ Fresh · Sabaton	Dubioza Kolektiv, Modestep, DJ Marky, Stamina MC, Eyesburn, Partibrejkers
2016	1-3 June	19,000	Juliette and the Licks · Skunk Anansie · John Digweed · Maxim · Suicidal Tendencies	Black Sun Empire, Francesca Lombardo, Fred V & Grafix, Dynamite MC, Roni Size, Krust, Blazzaj, Hladno Pivo, Negură Bunget, Ritam Nereda
2017	3-4 June	20,000	Rudimental · Sigala · Eluveitie · LTJ Bukem · Dubioza Kolektiv · Dubfire	Alternosfera, Șuie Paparude, Delta Heavy, Lee Burridge
2018	31 May-1 June	25,000	Gogol Bordello · Dub FX · Wilkinson	The Qemists, Zardonic, Nicole Moudaber, Filatov & Karas, Graham Candy, Mortiis, 1000mods, The Moon and the Nightspirit
2019	8-10 August	N/A	Kosheen · Unkle	Idiotape
