= Dosta! =

Council of Europe awareness raising campaign

Dosta! a Slavic word meaning "enough", is a Council of Europe awareness raising campaign which aims to bring non-Roma closer to Roma citizens by breaking down the barriers caused by prejudices and stereotypes.

== History of Dosta! ==
The Dosta! campaign began as part of a wider Council of Europe and European Commission joint programme called "Equal Rights and Treatment for Roma in South Eastern Europe".

It has been implemented in the following countries in 2006 and 2007:

- Albania
- Bosnia and Herzegovina
- Montenegro
- the Republic of Serbia
- the Republic of North Macedonia

Originally launched as a regional campaign, “Dosta!” sparked the interest of other Council of Europe Member States and consequently, other states have joined or created partnerships:

- Ukraine
- Moldova
- Italy
- Romania
- Croatia
- Slovenia
- Latvia
- Bulgaria
- France

== Dosta!-Congress Prize for Municipalities ==
The “DOSTA!-Congress Prize for municipalities” was launched in 2007 by the Congress of Local and Regional Authorities and the Dosta! Campaign as part of their ongoing work to strengthen the role of local authorities in the field of Roma and minority rights’ protection. “Dosta” is a Romani word meaning “enough”.

This Prize is awarded every two years to municipalities from Council of Europe member states that have implemented innovative and creative initiatives to effectively ensure the long-term integration of the Roma communities within their borders, while respecting the diversity of these communities and ensuring their active participation in local democratic life.

The top three projects receive the Dosta!-Congress Prize for Municipalities during a ceremony organised on the occasion of the Congress Plenary Session which takes place at the headquarters of the Council of Europe in Strasbourg.

=== Winners ===
The 1st edition of the Dosta!-Congress Prize was held in 2007 and opened to South-Eastern European members only. Three cities were rewarded for their involvement in favor of Roma inclusion:

- Vitez (Bosnia and Herzegovina): 1st Prize
- Banja Luka (Bosnia and Herzegovina): 2nd Prize
- Novi Sad (Serbia): 3rd Prize

Since its 2nd edition, the Dosta!-Congress Prize has been opened to all the municipalities from the 47 Council of Europe member states. Thus, for the 2008 edition of the Prize, four municipalities were rewarded:

- Mostar and Prijedor (Bosnia Herzegovina): 1st joint Prize
- Volos (Greece): 2nd Prize
- Lom (Bulgaria): 3rd Prize

The 3rd edition of the Dosta!-Congress Prize was held in 2011 and again four communities have been awarded for their involvement:

- City of Jyväskylä (Finland) and Surčin, City of Belgrade (Serbia): 1st joint Prize
- Comunidad de Madrid (Spain): 2nd Prize
- Southwark Council, Greater London (United Kingdom): 3rd Prize

In 2013, the 4th Dosta!-Congress Prize has been awarded to three local and regional authorities which were distinguished for their participatory and innovative work in combating anti-Gypsyism and promoting the inclusion of Roma in political and social life. Winners were:

- Obrnice (Czech Republic): 1st Prize
- Heraklion (Greece): 2nd Prize
- Regional authority of Kocaeli Province (Turkey): 3rd Prize

The 5th edition of the Dosta!-Congress Prize was held in 2015. Awarded authorities received their Prize during a ceremony on the occasion of the Congress’ 29th Plenary Session which took place at the Council of Europe in Strasbourg on October 2015.

== Other sources ==
- Strengethening Roma Rights
- Dosta! (http://www.dosta.org/)
