= Dubioza kolektiv =

Bosnian rock band

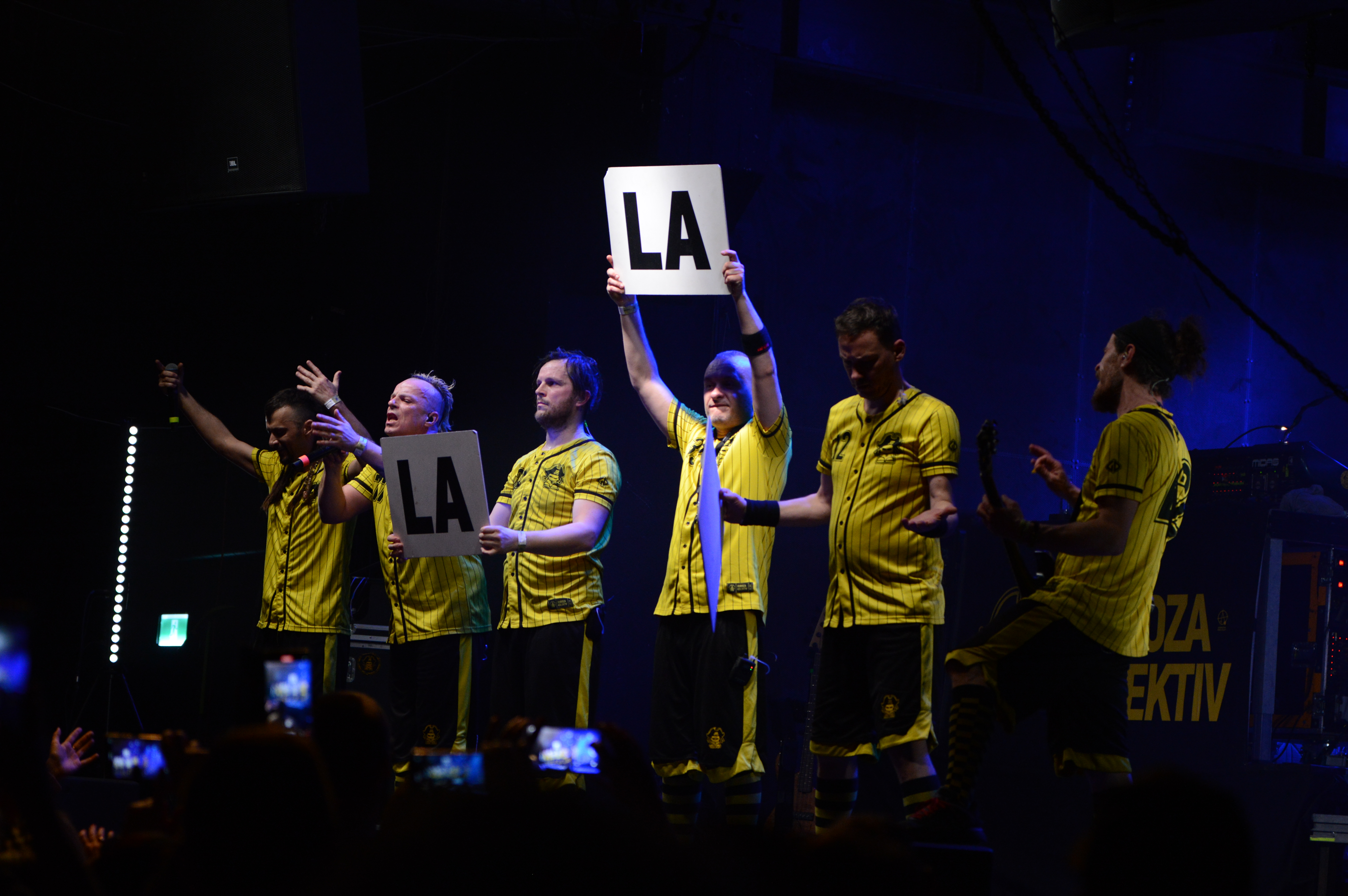
- Dubioza Kolektiv in February 2023

Background information
- Origin: Zenica, Mostar, Sarajevo (Bosnia and Herzegovina)
- Genres: Rap rock, reggae, ska, dub, alternative rock, funk rock, ska punk
- Years active: 2003–present
- Labels: Gramofon, Ekipa, Koolarrow Records, Menart Records, 300 Producciones
- Members: Almir Hasanbegović (singer); Adis Zvekić (singer); Brano Jakubović (keyboards); Vedran Mujagić (bass guitarist); Mario Ševarac (saxophonist); Senad Šuta (drums); Jernej Šavel (guitarist)
- Past members: Armin Bušatlić (guitarist); Adisa Zvekić (singer); Alan Hajduk (singer); Emir Alić (drums); Orhan Maslo (percussion) Adnan Gojak (sound engineer)
- Website: dubioza.org

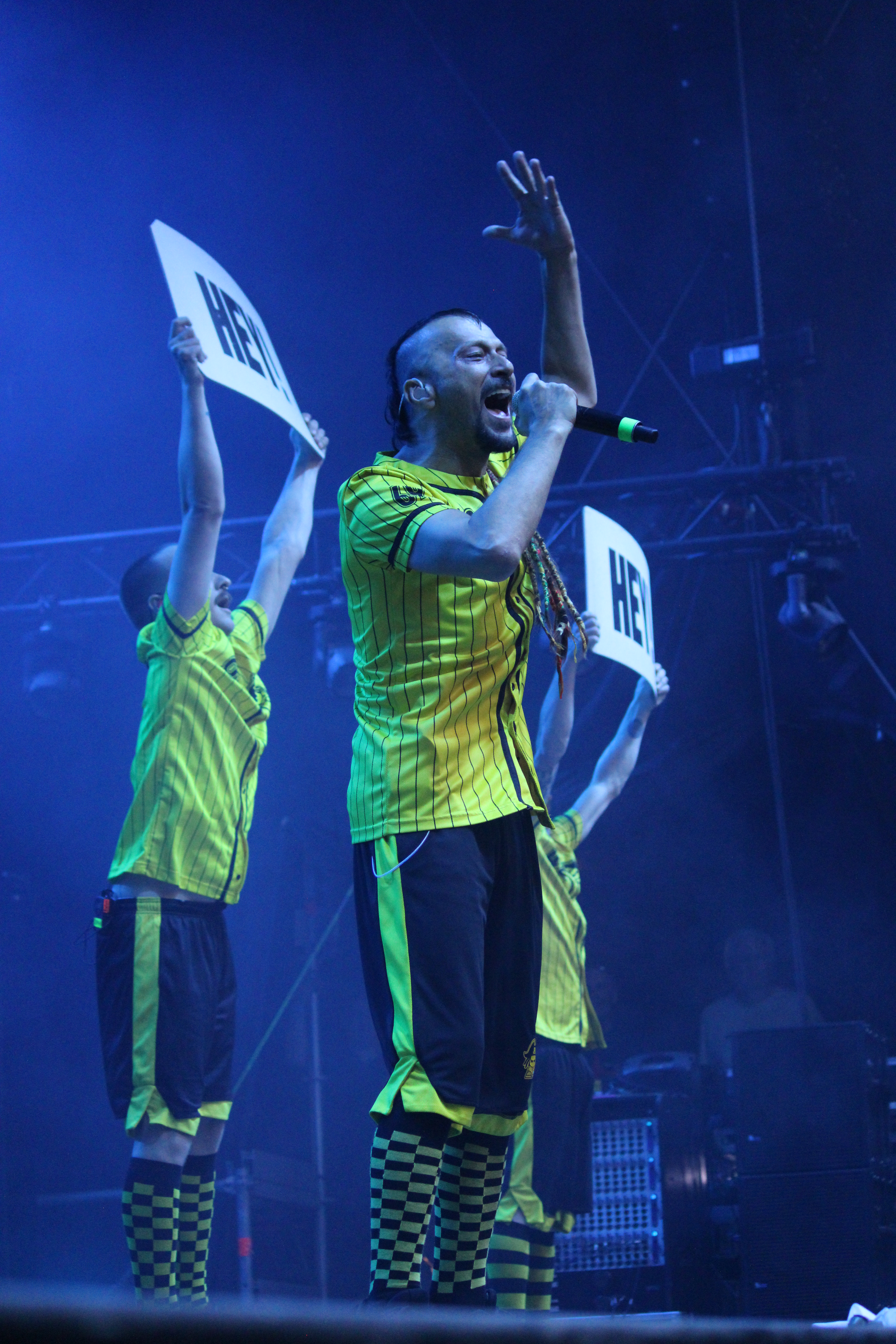
Dubioza Kolektiv, Rudolstadt Festival 2025

Dubioza kolektiv (also known simply as Dubioza) is a Bosnian dub rock group known for their crossover style that incorporates elements of hip hop, ska, reggae/dub, rock, punk, electronic music, and Balkan music, and for their socially and politically conscious songwriting with lyrics in multiple languages. In 2015, Dubioza kolektiv was referred to as the most popular Bosnian musical act. The group attracted international attention during the 2026 FIFA World Cup when their 2011 song "USA" was adopted as an unofficial anthem for the Bosnian national team.

== History ==
Dubioza kolektiv was formed in 2003 by Brano Jakubović, Vedran Mujagić, Almir Hasanbegović and Adis Zvekić with the merger of two musical groups, Ornament and Gluho doba. The band originates from Sarajevo and Zenica. Dubioza kolektiv initially also featured a female vocal, but the singer, Adisa Zvekić, eventually left the group to pursue a solo career. The group's performances have been multilingual (Bosnian and English) ever since the band's inception.

Singer Adis Zvekić stated that he first set up a band that served as a forerunner for Dubioza in 1993, when he was 13 years old. Due to the Bosnian War, there was no electricity; the band used to meet in the evenings and have jam sessions in the dark. All band members declare themselves to have had a working-class background, being the children of workers and peasants.

Though the group considered contending to represent Bosnia in the Eurovision Song Contest, they eventually decided against the idea as they would have to sign a contract obligating them to refrain from making any political statements. Instead, they recorded and released a highly critical and political song; "Euro song".

=== Dubioza kolektiv, and Open Wide (2004–2006) ===
Dubioza kolektiv released their self-titled first album in April 2004. Two of the songs also featured accompanying music videos.

The Open Wide EP was released in December 2004, and featured four remixes of songs from the Dubioza kolektiv album, and two up until then unpublished tracks featuring English dub poet Benjamin Zephaniah, and Mush Khan of the Pakistani-British group, Fun-Da-Mental.

=== Dubnamite (2006–2008) ===
Dubnamite features 10 songs.

=== Firma ilegal (2008–2010) ===
Firma ilegal (English: Illegal Enterprise) was the first album where all lyrics were written in the Bosnian language. The album addresses the social and political situation and Transition economy in Balkan societies, discussing corruption, privatization vs. social ownership, and the opportunistic political oligarchy.

=== 5 do 12 (2010–2011) ===
Dubioza's fourth album, 5 do 12, was the first to be released online in full and for download free of charge. The album featured Plavi orkestar vocalist Saša Lošić, and Macedonian ska punk group, Superhiks. The CD release also featured remixes of the songs by other artists and recordings from MTV Live @ Skirlibaba Studio sessions. The work continued on the path set by Firma ilegal, featuring socially critical lyrics written in the Bosnian language.

=== Wild Wild East (2011–2013) ===
Wild Wild East was the first album released for an international audience/market, marking the group's entry onto the international stage some 8 years after its founding. The album satirises an array of topics, including the way in which Western Europe looks down at Bosnia and Herzegovina in "Euro Song", capitalism in "Making Money" and the falsehood behind the promises made by the American Dream in "USA".

=== Apsurdistan (2013–2015) ===
Apsurdistan features 13 songs.

=== Happy Machine (2015–2017) ===
Lyrics for the songs on the Happy Machine album were penned in response to events that unfolded over the 2 years prior to its publication, including the Gezi Park protests, The Pirate Bay trial, and the European refugee crisis, and featured numerous collaborating artists from around the globe and lyrics in English, Spanish, Punjabi, and Italian. The album title is an allusion to the makeshift distillation apparatus used to distill rakija, a regionally popular variety of moonshine. The drink is also mentioned in the song "No Escape (from Balkan)", and a blueprint for the distillation contraption is also featured on the album cover (in protest of new EU regulations requiring a permit even for small scale spirit production intended for domestic use).

The group also saw waxing international success, appearing at Glastonbury Festival 2015, and at South by Southwest in 2016, marking their US debut.

=== Pjesmice za djecu i odrasle (2017–2020) ===
Dubioza's 2017 album, Pjesmice za djecu i odrasle (English: Songs for Youths and Adults) features songs written exclusively in Bosnian language. The album's singles include "Himna generacije", "Treba mi zraka", and "Rijaliti".

=== World Cup 2026 breakthrough ===
A song from Dubioza's 2011 album Wild Wild East, "USA", was adopted as an unofficial anthem for the Bosnian national football team during the 2026 FIFA World Cup qualifiers. The original track was a satire on immigration from Bosnia to America and the American Dream, written mostly in English. In response to its popularity among Bosnian supporters, the group released a new version, retitled "I Am From Bosnia, Take Me to America" and featuring more Bosnian lyrics, urging on the national team. A 2026 music video for the new version features the members of the group playing football and grilling in a Sarajevo neighbourhood, and was shot on a mobile phone on a low budget. As of July 2026, the video had surpassed 5 million plays on YouTube (on top of 26 million views for the original "USA" song from 2011), and had attracted global attention.

== Musical style ==
Dubioza kolektiv has been described as a "band without a genre". The group's distinct eclectic musical style has been shaped by the members' dissimilar and varied musical influences and backgrounds. The group never attempted to define a genre, preferring instead to focus on the ideas they wish to communicate to the audience and tailoring their music accordingly.

The group's music often combines serious lyrical themes and content with satirical and humorous lyrical style and presentation, and a lighthearted melody and simple and danceable rhythm, attempting to appeal to as wide an audience as possible in disseminating its art and ideas. As keyboardist Brano Jakubović put it: "[Our songs] prove that people can dance and think at the same time."

The content of many Dubioza songs is addressed and especially pertinent to the wider Balkan region, addressing the shared experience of (post-)transitional societies, their collective consciousnesses characteristically marred by the perception of widespread corruption, of failed privatisation of socially owned property, and opportunistic political oligarchy. With their expanding reach, the band has also begun to address social and political topics common to all Western and global contemporary society, often with lyrics written in English. The group nonetheless consistently incorporates a "Balkan sound" into its music, in part to combat common prejudices based on stereotypes regarding the musical form of the region, and to make their music instantly recognisable.

The group has also adopted a distinctive on-stage image, featuring yellow-black dress replete with the band's, Ziggi rolling papers', and The Pirate Bay' logos, a tight stage choreography, lively and rambunctious performance antics, and proactive audience interaction.

Members of the group embrace a "DIY" approach to music, writing, recording and producing it in their own studio, self-designing disc covers and websites, and carrying out most of the remaining band-related work like administering the band's social media presence and producing music videos largely by themselves. The band has an internal contest where band members who successfully contribute lyrics receive a monetary reward so as to self-encourage the group's songwriting.

Dubioza has consistently embraced socially and politically conscious texts, speaking out about injustices befalling ordinary people, political corruption, and attempting to raise public political awareness. Band members believe that it is the duty of artists to utilise their media to promote positive ideas and values.

== Activism ==
The group's activism against "right-wing parties, xenophobia and fascism" is in part based on their home country's experience with the repercussions of such ideologies.

Dubioza has supported various civic movements and non-governmental organisations (including by advocating them during live performances), having attended and performed at the 2012 Slovenian protests and 2015 Macedonian protests, and supported the Dosta! Roma awareness raising campaign, the Refugees Welcome campaign, a Slovenian environmentalist campaign to preserve the Mura River, and a campaign to revive the Bosnian Dita Tuzla laundry detergent factory wrecked by the Bosnian War and subsequent privatisation. Dubioza also actively advocates for the legalisation of marijuana through their lyrics and during live performances.

Dubioza kolektiv has made all their recent albums available for download free of charge on their website, also uploading them onto The Pirate Bay. Their song "Free.mp3 (The Pirate Bay Song)" pays homage to the peer-to-peer website and its jailed founders, lampoons global pop culture and political figures including Kim Kardashian, Miley Cyrus, and Barack Obama, and explores copyright in the digital age, internet privacy, and freedom of information. The song and music video were subsequently featured on Pirate Bay's homepage.

Instead of monetising their songs through intellectual property, Dubioza has instead been committed to exploring alternate modes of generating income as artists, including promoting their live performances instead of record sales, marketing the group's merchandise, and soliciting cryptocurrency donations, while regarding the traditional mode of music industry income generation as "outdated" and unfair to the artists. Dubioza believes in free exchange of art, ideas, and knowledge, with the audience voluntarily deciding whether they wish to monetarily reward the authors depending on whether they like their work. The band has also stated they found releasing albums online has strengthened their bond with their audience.

Dubioza has dedicated multiple concerts to charitable causes and donated the earnings, including to victims of 2014 Southeast Europe floods in Bosnia, and the children's Mostar Rock School.

== Discography ==
=== Studio albums ===
- Dubioza kolektiv (2004)
- Dubnamite (2006)
- Unpopular singles (Compilation CD) (2007)
- Firma Ilegal (2008)
- 5 do 12 (2010)
- Wild Wild East (2011)
- Apsurdistan (2013)
- Happy Machine (2015)
- Pjesmice za djecu i odrasle (2017)
- #fakenews (2020)
- Agrikultura (2022)

=== Live albums ===
- Live Pol’and’Rock 2018 (CD / DVD) (2019)

=== Extended plays ===
- Open Wide (EP) (2004)
- Happy Machine (EP) (2014)

=== Music videos ===
- "Bring the System Down" (2004)
- "Be Highirly" (2004)
- "Bosnian Rastafaria" (2005)
- "Ovo je zatvor" (2005)
- "Receive" (Live) (2006)
- "Wasted Time" (2006)
- "Triple Head Monster" (2007)
- "Svi u štrajk" (2007)
- "Šuti i trpi" (2008)
- "Walter" (2010)
- "Kokuz" (2010)
- "Making Money" (2011)
- "U.S.A." (2011)
- "Kažu" (2013)
- "No Escape (from Balkan)" (2014)
- "Free.mp3 (The Pirate Bay Song)" (2015)
- "One More Time" (2016)
- "Himna generacije" (2017)
- "Treba mi zraka" (2017)
- "Rijaliti" (2018)
- "Wild Wild East" (2018)
- "Cross The Line" feat. Manu Chao (2019)
- "Kafana" (2021)
- "Bubrezi" (2022)
- "Može li" (2022)
- ''U3PM'' (2024)
- ''Balkan Boys'' (2025)
- ''Rakija y Ron'' feat. Adria Salas (2025)
- ''BLKRCZM'' (2025)
- ''f.u.c.k.y.o.u.'' (2025)
- ''YEBIGA'' (2026)
- "I Am from Bosnia - Take Me to America" (2026)

== Band members ==
=== Current ===
- Brano Jakubović – sampling, keyboards, acoustic guitar (2004–)
- Vedran Mujagić – bass guitar (2004–)
- Almir Hasanbegović – vocals (2004–)
- Adis Zvekić – vocals (2004–)
- Senad Šuta – drums (2007–)
- Mario Ševarac – saxophone (2012–)
- Jernej Šavel – guitar (2015–)

=== Former ===
- Alan Hajduk – vocals (2004–2005)
- Emir Alić – drums (2004–2007)
- Adisa Zvekić – vocals (2004–2008)
- Orhan Maslo Oha – percussion (2006–2011)
- Armin Bušatlić – guitar (2004–2015)

== Awards ==
Year	Award	Category	Nominee(s)	Result	Ref.
2005	Davorin	Award for Musical Innovation	Dubioza kolektiv	Won	
2005	Davorin	Debut album of the Year	Dubioza kolektiv	Won	
2007	Davorin	Music Video of the Year – Urban/Rock	"Dosta"	Won	
2009	Indexi	Blues, Dub, Reggae Album of the Year	Firma ilegal	Won	
2011	Indexi	Rock & all album of the Year	5 do 12	Won	
2011	MTV Adria	Best Adria Act	Dubioza kolektiv	Won	
2012	Golden Ladybug of Popularity	Best Band of the Balkans	Dubioza kolektiv	Won	
2012	The Trophy of Bucovina	—	Dubioza kolektiv	Won	
2012	WebAward.Me	Best Personal Web	dubioza.org	Won	
2014	MTV Adria	Video play Diamond Award	"Kažu"	Won	
2014	Split Spot Festival	Music Video of the Year	"Kažu"	Won	
2016	Independent Music Companies Association	European Independent Album of the Year	Happy Machine	Nominated	
2018	MTS Vision	Best Editing and Post-production	"Free.mp3 (The Pirate Bay Song)"	Won	
2018	MTS Vision	Best Ska-reggae Video	"No Escape (from Balkan)"	Won	
2018	Złoty Bączek	Best International Performance at Pol'and'Rock Festival	Dubioza kolektiv	Won	

== See also ==
- List of Bosnia and Herzegovina patriotic songs
