= Boris Brejcha =

German DJ and record producer

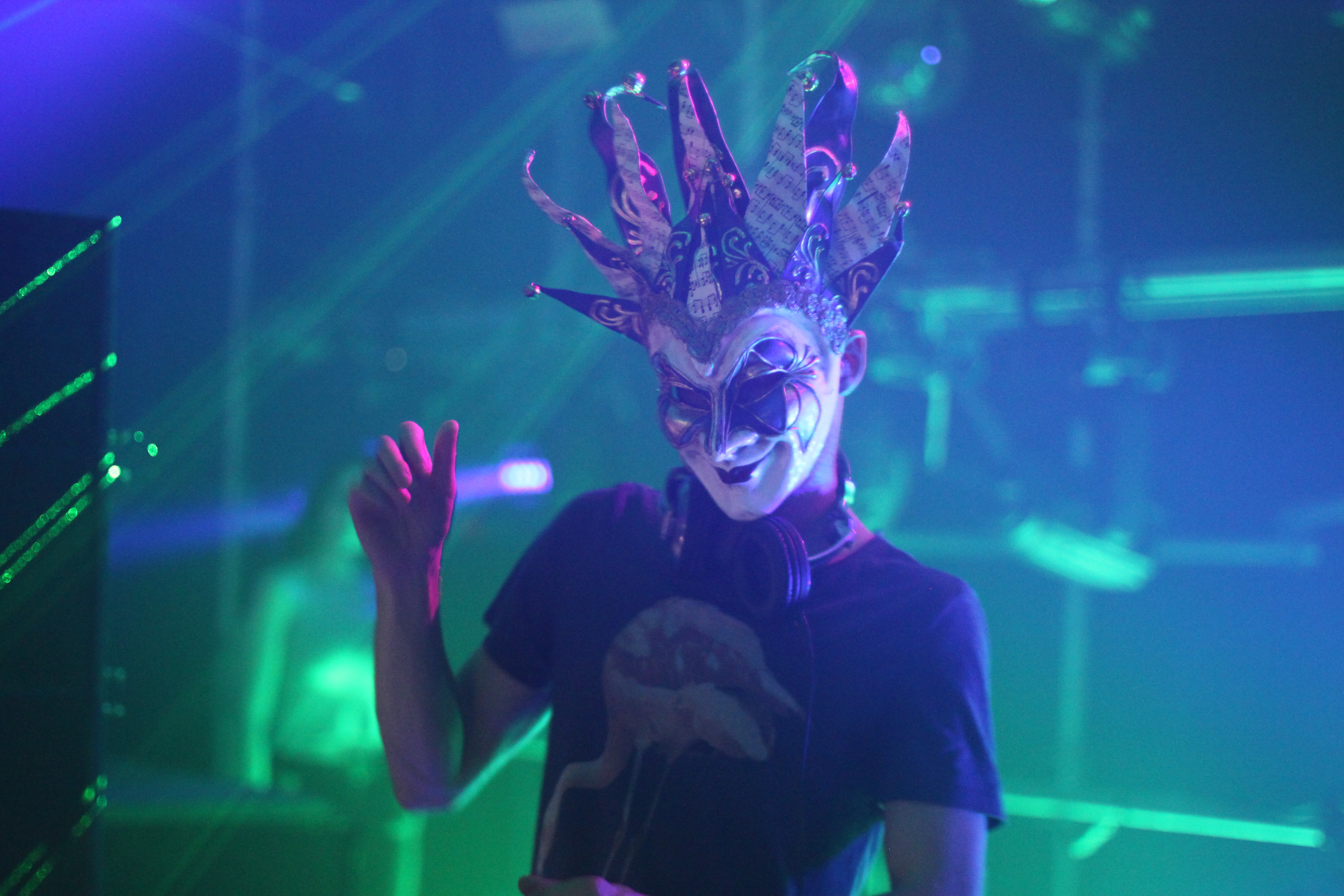

Background information
- Born: November 26, 1981 (age 44); Ludwigshafen am Rhein, Rhineland-Palatinate, West Germany
- Genres: Minimal techno, tech house, electro house, progressive house, acid techno, Dutch house
- Occupations: DJ; record producer
- Label: Harthouse

Boris Brejcha (German pronunciation: ['borɪs ˈbrɛjʃaː]; born November 26, 1981, in Ludwigshafen am Rhein) is a German DJ and record producer. He describes his music style as "high-tech minimal."

Brejcha frequently wears a joker mask based on a Carnival of Venice design. He has performed at clubs and festivals around the world, including Tomorrowland and Coachella. Boris founded the label Fckng Serious in 2015 with Ann Clue and Deniz Bul. He performed for the first time in Ibiza in August 2019, at Hï Ibiza club.

On 24 January 2020, Brejcha released his sixth album Space Diver as his first album for Ultra Records.

In 2021, Brejcha was 42nd on DJ Mags Top 100 DJs.

== Personal life ==
Boris Brejcha was born in Ludwigshafen, Germany, in 1981. At the age of six, he was seriously injured in the Ramstein air show disaster, becoming badly burnt, and spent months in the hospital. He states in an interview:

This was a special incident in my life. I was alone, I was a little boy and I was in an extreme situation.

At the age of 40, Brejcha still bears extensive scars from the severity of the burns.

Brejcha was inspired to learn how to make electronic music in middle school after a classmate of his brought a Thunderdome CD. He began producing electronic music at the age of 12.

Brejcha's first music release was in 2006. That same year, he performed his first festival at the Universo Paralello Festival in Brazil. Since then, his Joker mask, inspired by the Carnival of Venice, has been his trademark. Numerous gigs in South America and Russia soon followed and he continues to tour to this day. He was named "Exceptional Talent 2007" in the music magazine Raveline.

He went on to release music on Autist Records and later on Harthouse. Brejcha's music has become known as belonging to the genre "high-tech minimal".

== Discography ==
=== Albums ===
- 2007: Die Maschinen Kontrollieren Uns
- 2007: Die Maschinen sind Gestrandet
- 2008: Mein Wahres Ich
- 2010: My Name Is
- 2011: My Name Is – The Remix
- 2013: Feuerfalter – Part01
- 2014: Feuerfalter – Part02
- 2014: Feuerfalter – Special Edition
- 2016: 22
- 2016: Dj Mixes Single Track
- 2020: Space Diver
- 2020: Livestream Mix (Mixed)
- 2021: Never Stop Dancing
- 2024: Level One
- 2025: "Christmas Mix 2024"
- 2025: XOXO

=== Singles ===
- 2006: Monster -- Autist Records
- 2006: Yellow Kitchen -- Autist Records
- 2007: White Snake -- Harthouse
- 2007: Outer Space -- Harthouse
- 2007: Die Maschinen Sind Gestrandet -- Harthouse
- 2007: Die Milchstraße -- Harthouse
- 2007: Who Is Your Man -- Harthouse
- 2008: Lost Memory -- Harthouse
- 2008: Aquilah -- Harthouse
- 2009: Joystick -- Harthouse
- 2009: Commander Tom -- Harthouse
- 2009: Magic Gum -- Harthouse
- 2009: Schaltzentrale -- Harthouse
- 2010: Diffusor -- Harthouse
- 2011: Sugar Baby -- Harthouse
- 2011: James Bond -- Harthouse
- 2011: Rührschüssel -- Harthouse
- 2012: Farbenfrohe Stadt -- Harthouse
- 2012: Der Mensch Wird Zur Maschine -- Harthouse
- 2012: That´s The Funky Shit -- Harthouse
- 2013: Der Alchemyst -- Harthouse
- 2013: We Go -- Harthouse
- 2013: Everybody Wants To Go To Heaven -- Harthouse
- 2014: Hashtag -- No Label
- 2015: SAW -- No Label
- 2015: Schleierwolken -- No Label
- 2015: R U FCKNG SERIOUS -- Fckng Serious
- 2015: I Am The Joker -- Fckng Serious
- 2015: Young And Stupid -- Fckng Serious
- 2015: S.P.A.C.E. -- Fckng Serious
- 2016: Out Of Brain -- Fckng Serious
- 2016: Acid Attack -- Fckng Serious
- 2016: Sir Ravealot -- Fckng Serious
- 2016: FEAR -- Fckng Serious
- 2017: Space Gremlin -- Fckng Serious
- 2017: Bleeding Heart -- Fckng Serious
- 2018: Devil -- Fckng Serious
- 2019: Gravity -- Ultra Music
- 2019: Happinezz -- Ultra Music
- 2019: Butterflies -- Ultra Music
- 2019: Never Look Back -- Ultra Music
- 2019: Lieblingsmensch -- Ultra Music
- 2020: To The Moon And Back -- Ultra Music
- 2020: Violet Pill -- Ultra Music
- 2020: Thunderstorm -- Ultra Music
- 2020: Chameleon -- Ultra Music
- 2020: Cocoloco -- Ultra Music
- 2020: Happy Birthday -- No Label
- 2020: Puzzle -- Ultra Music
- 2021: Spicy -- Ultra Music
- 2021: House Music -- Ultra Music
- 2021: EXIT -- Ultra Music
- 2021: Take A Ride -- Ultra Music
- 2021: Matrix -- Ultra Music
- 2021: Twisted Reality -- Ultra Music
- 2021: Vodka & Orange -- Ultra Music
- 2021: Never Stop Dancing -- Ultra Music
- 2022: Up Down Jumper -- Fckng Serious
- 2022: Club Vibes Part 01 -- Harthouse
- 2022: I Want You -- Fckng Serious
- 2022: Club Vibes Part 02 -- Harthouse
- 2022: Club Vibes Part 03 -- Harthouse
- 2022: Timelapse -- Fckng Serious
- 2022: Club Vibes Part 04 -- Harthouse
- 2022: Captain Nemo -- Fckng Serious
- 2023: Club Vibes Part 05 -- Harthouse
- 2023: Club Vibes Part 06 -- Harthouse
- 2023: Atomic Heart -- Fckng Serious
- 2023: Level One -- Fckng Serious
- 2023: Space X -- Fckng Serious
- 2023: You Can Forever Be -- Fckng Serious
- 2023: Vienna -- Fckng Serious
- 2023: Dimension -- Fckng Serious
- 2024: Miracle -- Fckng Serious
- 2024: Terminal Zero -- Fckng Serious
- 2025: "Python" -- Fckng Serious
- 2026 "lily at the valley"
