= I Hate Models =

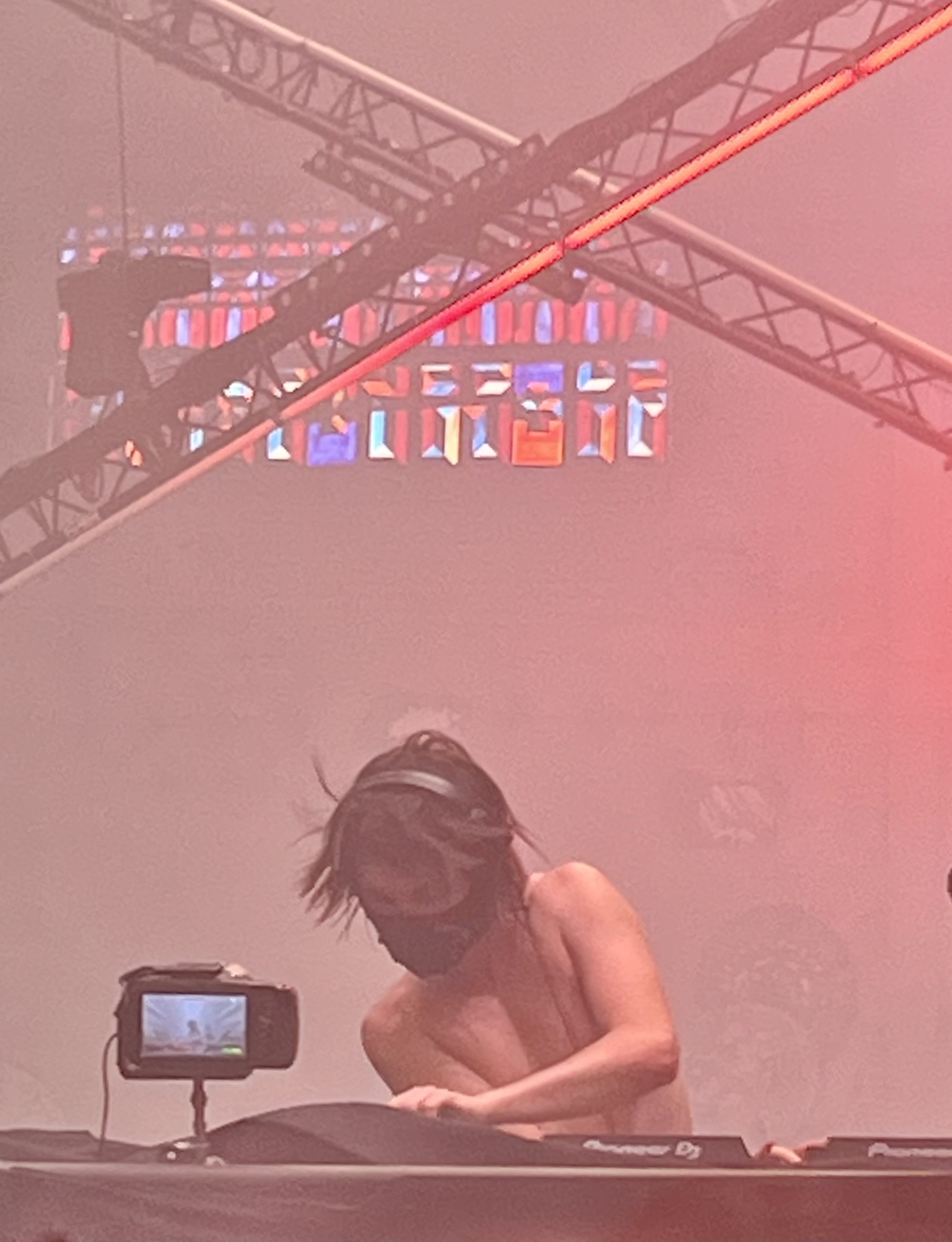
- I Hate Models at the Babcock Factory, in La Courneuve, Seine-Saint-Denis, in June 2024.

Background information
- Born: 8 June 1995 (age 31); France
- Genres: Techno, Industrial techno, electronic body music, tech trance
- Occupations: Producer, disc jockey
- Years active: 2015–present

Guillaume Labadie (born 8 June 1995), known professionally as I Hate Models is a French techno music producer and DJ.

== Biography ==
=== Early Years and Personal life ===
Guillaume Labadie grew up in the south of France He began to develop an interest in electronic music in middle school, originally listening mainly to hip-hop, punk rock, and heavy metal. In particular, he was inspired by an album of electronic remixes from one of his favorite bands, which led him to remix other metal and punk tracks himself.

His pseudonym, "I Hate Models", derives from "an abhorrence for literal models or genres and being put into boxes, rather than the faces gracing the covers of Vogue and more on a monthly basis". He keeps his interactions with the press to a minimum and systematically appears wearing a mask in public – for example, with a bandana in his early performances – to maintain his anonymity.

=== Career ===
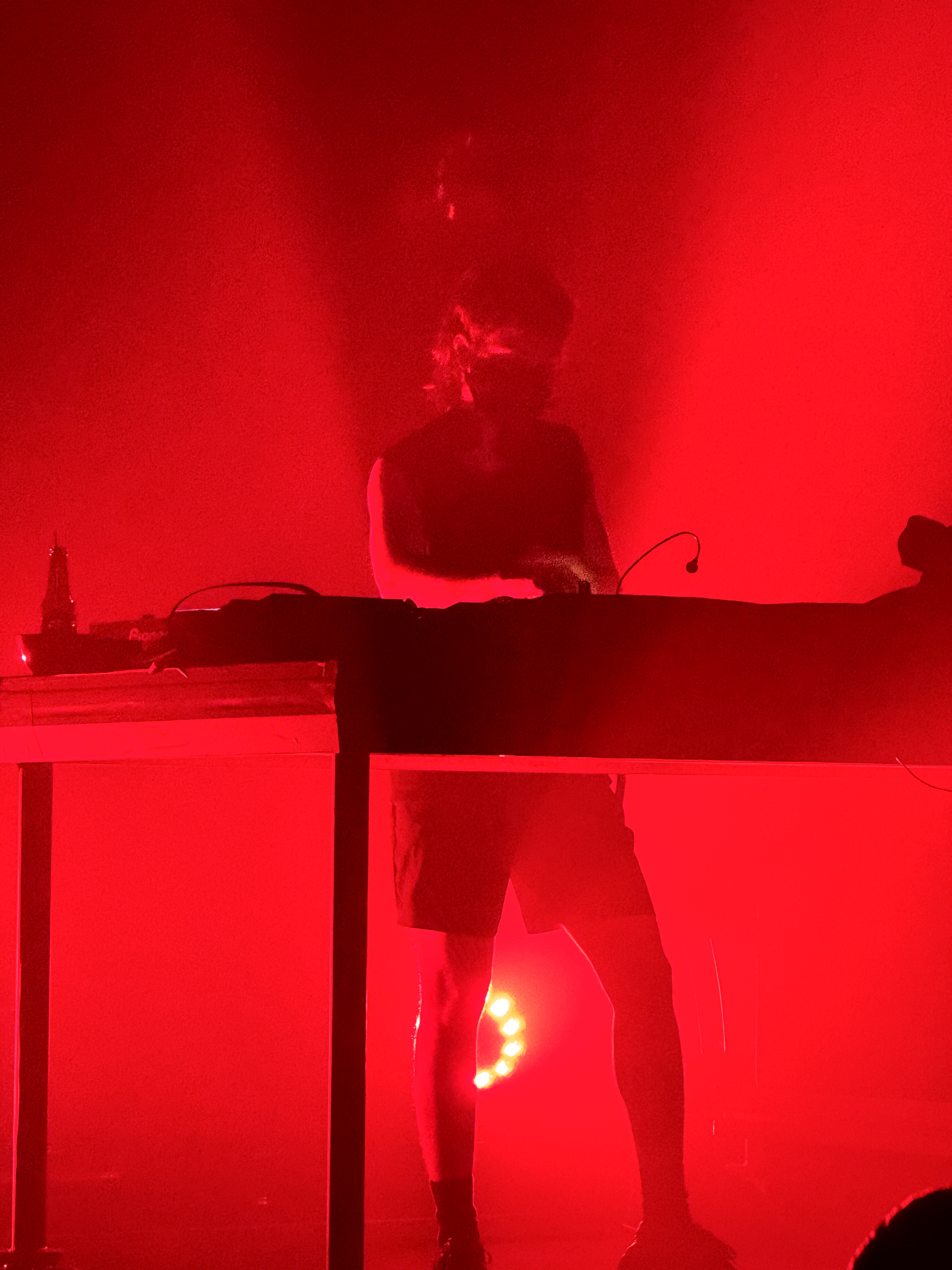
I Hate Models at club Phantom in Paris in March 2024.

I Hate Models began his career in 2015 by releasing his first single Persephone. His first EP was Warehouse Memories, released on the label ARTS in 2016 and including the track Daydream. In 2017, he continued with several EPs, including State of Control, where the track Last Kiss Before Death was noted by DJ Mag for its "thrusting, EBM-esque hammer, scored by savage industrial synthwork".

At the end of 2018, I Hate Models made his first appearance on the London-based industrial techno label Perc Trax with the EP Spreading Plague. Critics were positive, with Tsugi noting that "his sounds become denser" and DJ Mag praising the main track as well as a remix made by Perc himself. In June 2019, also on the label Perc Trax, he released his first album: L'Âge des métamorphoses, composed of twelve tracks. The album was generally well received by critics, with Inverted Audio calling it a "stunning album" and Manifesto XXI commenting that "L’Âge des Métamorphoses is a radical, daring, pioneering work, intensely percussive and corrosive". XLR8R noted that the rhythm of the album "glides between melodic, vocal, percussive, and acid sections, keeping interest high without ever dropping into locked techno loops" and Tsugi pointed out that "a clever violence punctuates and deconstructs moments of grace with wild EBM and granular kicks". However, Resident Advisor was more reserved and concluded that "L'Âge Des Métamorphoses is only original when it's not just hammering into your skull". After this album, he was selected by the magazine Mixmag as one of the DJ revelations of the year for 2019.

In 2020, I Hate Models was invited by the Possession collective with Anetha and Ascendant Vierge to perform for France Télévisions on Culturebox. At the beginning of 2021, he created his own label called Disco Inferno and simultaneously released the EP Disco Inferno 01.

In March 2023, he was the headliner for the opening night of the club Phantom, located under the Accor Arena in Paris. At the beginning of 2024, he mixed an entire evening at the Halle Tony Garnier in Lyon, the first date of this type in over two decades. In January 2024, a study by the platform specializing in ticketing Shotgun concluded that he is the most listened-to live performance artist by Generation Z, ahead of the artist Fred Again.

In November 2024, he announced the release of his next EP titled Forever Melancholia, containing five tracks and released as three singles.

== Musical style ==
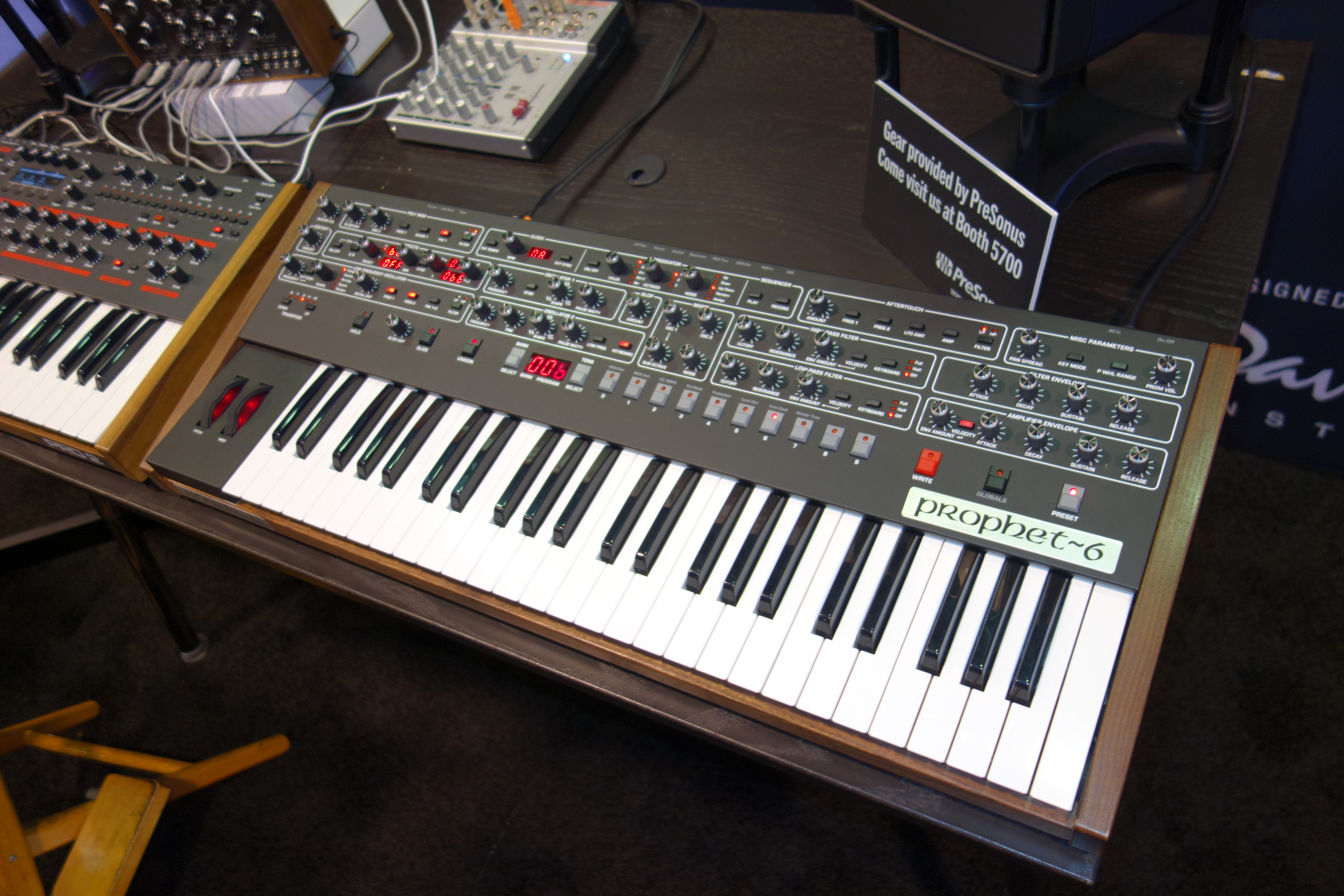
I Hate Models notably used the Sequential Circuits Prophet 6 synthesizer to compose his album L'Âge des métamorphoses.

I Hate Models primarily produces and mixes techno music, but his influences include synthwave, trance, cold wave, industrial music, and electronic body music. His style is often compared to the rave culture of the early 1990s. For his album L'Âge des métamorphoses, he developed the tracks using a Sequential Prophet 6 synthesizer, a Jomox Xbase 999 drum machine, and effects pedals like the Dreadbox Epsilon.

According to Resident Advisor, the themes and feelings addressed in his productions "veers from nostalgia and passion to loneliness, melancholia and brutality".

== Discography ==
=== Studio albums ===
- 2019: L'Âge des métamorphoses
- 2024: Forever Melancholia

=== EPs ===
- 2016: Warehouse Memories
- 2016: 500 Lesbians in Irak
- 2016: The Black Dissident EP
- 2016: The Lost Tapes
- 2017: Absolution XXL
- 2017: Totsuka No Tsurugi
- 2017: State of Control EP
- 2018: Midnight Cults
- 2018: Spreading Plague
- 2019: Intergalactic Emotional Breakdown
- 2021: Disco Inferno 01
