= Mahmut Orhan =

Turkish DJ and record producer (born 1993)

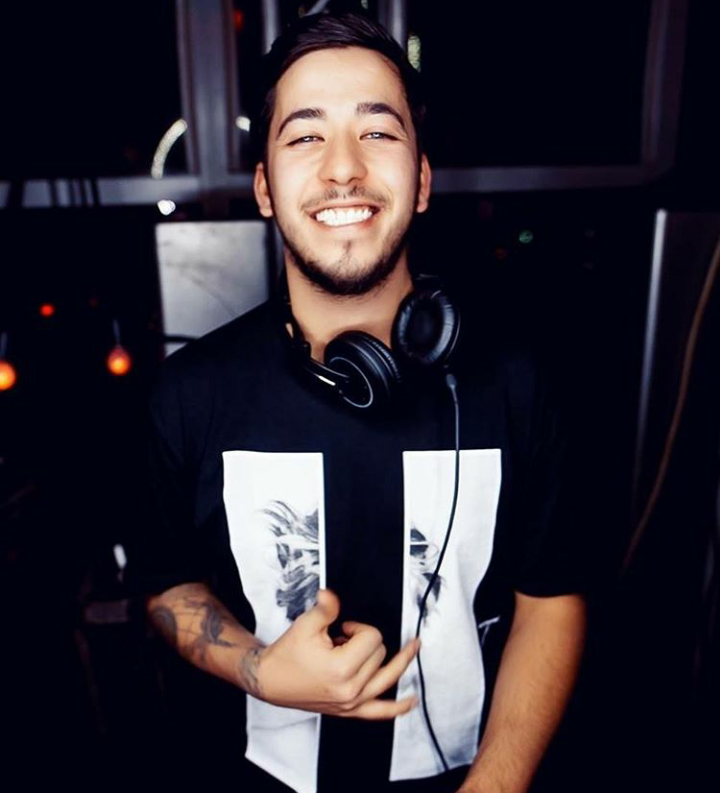
- Mahmut Orhan (January 2018)

Background information
- Born: 11 January 1993 (age 33); Bursa, Turkey
- Genres: EDM; deep house; nu disco; indie dance
- Occupations: DJ; record producer
- Years active: 2011–present
- Label: Ultra Music

Mahmut Orhan (born 11 January 1993) is a Turkish DJ and record producer.

== Career ==
He started working with music in Bursa at the age of 15 and eventually moved to Istanbul to work at a "Bebek" nightclub in 2011. He first experienced international success in 2015 with the instrumental song "Age of Emotions". One year later, his song "Feel" featuring Turkish singer and songwriter Sena Şener appeared on charts in Greece, Germany, Poland, Russia and Romania, among others. The song reached number one position on musical platform iTunes. In 2017, Mahmut released a remix of "Game of Thrones" and the song "Save Me" with Romanian singer Eneli, both of which gained significant success. In June 2018, he released a remix album titled "One". The lead single, "6 Days", a remix of Colonel Bagshot's "Six Day War", reached number one in many countries, such as Greece, Serbia, Romania and Bulgaria. Orhan has been part of some of the world's leading electronic music festivals, such as Exit Festival in Serbia and Untold Festival in Romania.

== Discography ==
=== Extended plays ===
Year	Album details
Undesirable Life	Release date: 2011; Record label: Underground City Music; Format: CD

=== Singles ===
Title	Year	Peak positions								Certifications
Title	Year	TUR	BEL (FL)	GER	GRE	LUX	POL	ROM	RS	Certifications
"Feel" (featuring Sena Șener)	2016	31	— (Note: "Feel" did not reach the region's Ultratop 50 chart, but was registered on the Ultratip Bubbling Under ranking.)	70	3	3	9	34	—	BVMI: Gold; ZPAV: Platinum
"Game of Thrones"	2017	—	—	—	—	—	—	—	—	
"Save Me" (featuring Eneli)	2017	—	—	—	—	—	—	—	—	
"6 Days" (with Colonel Bagshot)	2018	1	—	—	1	—	—	1	1	
"Schhh" (featuring Irina Rimes)	2019	—	—	—	—	—	—	—	—	
"6 Feet" (with Thomas Newson featuring Jason Gaffner)	2019	—	—	—	—	—	—	—	—	
"—" denotes an item that did not chart or was not released in that territory.

=== Albums ===
- Pangea (2024)

== Awards ==
- GQ Man of The Year 2018 - "Best Dj"
- Altın Kelebek 2022 - Best DJ
- Europaplus Best Track of Year 2016 Mahmut Orhan ft Sena Sener- FEEL
