= Anna-Lena =

Anna-Lena is a feminine given name. Notable people with the name include:

- Anna-Lena Axelsson (born 1956), Swedish orienteer
- Anna-Lena Bergelin (born 1959), Swedish writer, comedian, singer, and actress
- Anna-Lena Blomkvist (born 1973), Swedish politician
- Anna-Lena Forster (born 1995), German para-alpine skier
- Anna-Lena Friedsam (born 1994), German tennis player
- Anna-Lena Fritzon (born 1965), Swedish cross country skier
- Anna-Lena Grönefeld (born 1985), German tennis player
- Anna-Lena Laurin, Swedish composer and pianist
- Anna-Lena Lodenius (born 1958), Swedish journalist, author, and lecturer
- Anna-Lena Löfgren (1944–2010), Swedish singer
- Anna-Lena Schwing, German actress
- Anna-Lena Sörenson (born 1954), Swedish politician
- Anna-Lena Stolze (born 2000), German footballer
- Anna-Lena Strindlund (born 1971), Swedish actress

== See also ==
- Annalena, given name
- Analena, Croatian-Slovenian post-hardcore band
- Anna (given name)
- Lena (name)
