= Kitanovski =

Kitanovski (Macedonian: Китановски) is a Macedonian surname. Notable people with the surname include:

- Blagoja Kitanovski (born 1962), Macedonian footballer and manager
- Tome Kitanovski (born 1992), Macedonian footballer
- Toni Kitanovski (born 1964), Macedonian jazz guitarist
- Oliver Kitanovski (born 1980), Macedonian defender
