= Hell City Glamours =

Australian musical group

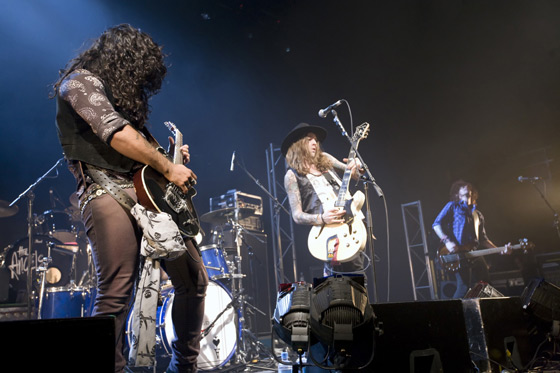
- Hell City Glamours performing at The Forum in Melbourne, November 2008

Background information
- Origin: Sydney, New South Wales, Australia
- Genres: Rock and roll, hard rock, pub rock
- Years active: 2002–2014
- Past members: Oscar McBlack; Mo Mayhem; Robbie Potts; Jonno Barwick
- Website: www.hellcityglamours.com

Hell City Glamours were an Australian hard rock band from Sydney. They supported the likes of Paul Stanley, New York Dolls, Sebastian Bach, Alice Cooper, Shihad, and Airbourne. They released three EP's, a split 7" single with the Devilrock Four and were responsible for a resurgence in hard rock/rock n roll in Sydney in the early 2000s. In late 2008 Hell City Glamours supported The Angels on their Night Attack tour which included four special shows with Rose Tattoo and released their debut album in Europe on Classic Rock Magazine's "Powerage" label. In March 2009 Hell City Glamours completed their first tour of the United States in which they played at Aussie BBQ and SXSW. In April 2014 they announced the release of their second and final self-titled album along with dates for their farewell tour. Whilst never receiving any support from radio, the Hell City Glamours were an incredibly popular live draw, known for their often sold-out, raucous live shows.

== Members ==
- Mo Mayhem – guitar
- Oscar McBlack – vocals, guitar
- Robbie Potts – drums
- Jono Barwick – bass
- Archi Fires – bass

== Discography ==
=== Albums ===
- Hell City Glamours (2008)
- Same (2014)

== EPs ==
- Les Infideles (2004)
- Broken Glass Beatless Hearts (2005)
- Hey Man (2006)

== In film ==
- I Know How Many Runs You Scored Last Summer (selected tracks)
