= Don't Throw It Away =

Don't Throw It Away may refer to:

- "Don't Throw It Away", a 2006 song by The Devilrock Four from First in Line
- "Don't Throw It Away", a 2019 song by Jonas Brothers from Happiness Begins
