= Annalena =

Annalena is a feminine given name. Notable people with the name include:

- Annalena Baerbock (born 1980), German politician
- Annalena McAfee (born c. 1952), British children's author and journalist
- Annalena Rieke (born 1999), German footballer
- Annalena Tonelli (1943–2003), Italian lawyer and social activist

== See also ==
- Anna-Lena, given name
- Analena, Croatian-Slovenian post-hardcore band
- AnnaLena (restaurant), a restaurant in Vancouver, British Columbia
