= Dobrodošli na okean =

Dobrodošli Na Okean

Studio album by Repetitor
- Released: November 29, 2012
- Recorded: 2011 & 2012 in Belgrade, Ljubljana, Vrbas and Trbovlje
- Genres: Alternative rock, indie rock, noise rock, garage rock, post-punk revival
- Labels: Moonlee Records _{HMRL028}
- Producers: Primož Vozelj, Repetitor

Repetitor chronology
Sve što vidim je prvi put (2008)	Dobrodošli Na Okean (2012)

Professional ratings
Review scores
Source	Rating
Popboks	Favorable link
Ravno Do Dna	link
Popboks	link
Rockline	link
Terapijna.net	link

Dobrodošli na okean (Welcome to the Ocean) is the second album by the Serbian alternative rock band Repetitor released by the Slovenian independent record label Moonlee Records in 2012.

== Track listing ==
All written by Repetitor, all lyrics written by Boris Vlastelica.

No.	Title	Length
1.	"Devojke Idu U Minhen" (Girls go to Munich)	2:25
2.	"Biću Bolji" (I Will Be Better)	2:09
3.	"Šteta" (Damage)	2:23
4.	"U Pravom Trenutku" (At the right Time)	4:21
5.	"Dostupni I Laki" (Accessible and easy)	3:18
6.	"Lica" (Faces)	2:19
7.	"Oktobarski Salon" (The October Salon)	1:52
8.	"Laka Zabava" (Easy Entertainment)	5:26
9.	"Pripazi Na Ljude" (Keep an eye on the People)	2:08

== Personnel ==
Repetitor

- Boris Vlastelica — guitar, vocals
- Ana-Marija Cupin — bass, vocals
- Milena Milutinović — drums

Additional personnel

- Ana-Marija Cupin — artwork by [design]
- Primož Vozelj — recorded by
- Goran Crevar — mixed by
- Carl Saff — mastered by
