= Bernays Propaganda =

Macedonian post-punk band

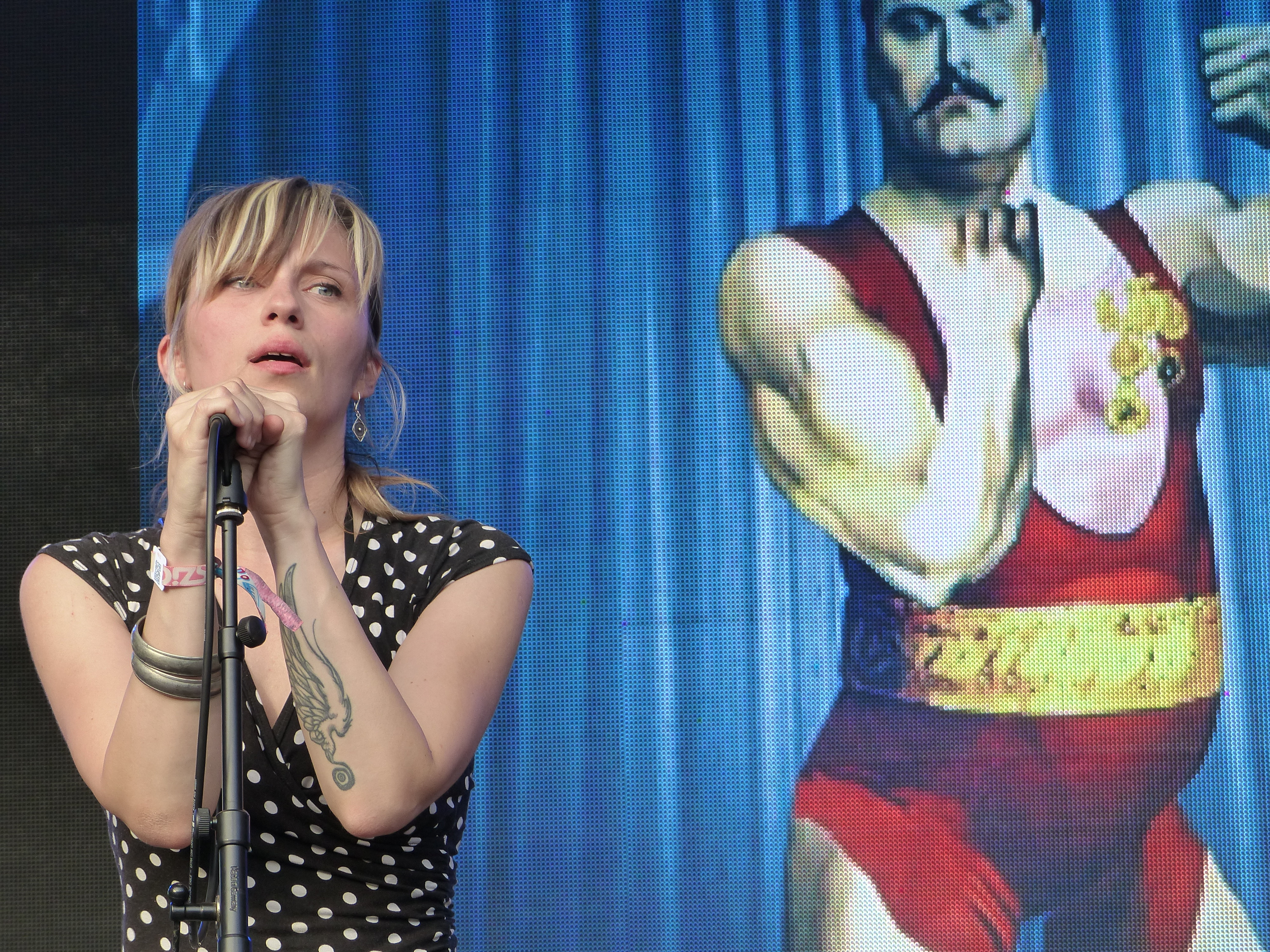
- Kristina Gorovska

Background information
- Origin: Skopje, North Macedonia
- Genres: Post-punk, new wave, dance-punk
- Labels: Moonlee Records, Balkan Veliki
- Members: Vasko Atanasoski; Kristina Gorovska; Deni Krstev; Rade Jordanovski; Kristijan Lafazanovski

Bernays Propaganda are a Macedonian post-punk band. They took their name from Edward Bernays' book Propaganda. While their lyrical content contains socio-political lyrics, their sound has drawn comparisons to New Order and Tom Tom Club.

Their 2019 release, Vtora mladost, treta svetska vojna (2nd Youth, 3rd World War), features American punk bassist Mike Watt and Macedonian jazz guitarist Toni Kitanovski on the track "Nisto nema da ne' razdeli". The track was also donated to Songs From Under the Floorboard, Vol. 1, proceeds of which go to Planned Parenthood.

== Discography ==
- Happiness Machines (2009)
- My Personal Holiday (2010)
- Zabraneta planeta (2013)
- Politika (2016)
- Vtora mladost, treta svetska vojna (2019)
