= Blue World Order (film) =

- Directed by: Ché Baker, Dallas Bland
- Written by: Ché Baker, Dallas Bland, Sarah Mason
- Produced by: Ché Baker, Tim Maddocks
- Starring: Billy Zane, Bruce Spence, Jack Thompson, Stephen Hunter, Jake Ryan, Bolude Fakuade, Kendra Appleton, Andy Trieu, Barbera Hastings, Bryant Evans, Billie Rutherford, Nathan Lee, Leah Baulch, T.K. Bell
- Release date: 2018
- Country: Australia
- Language: English

Blue World Order is a 2018 Australian martial arts science fiction film set in a post-apocalyptic world.

== Plot ==
In a post-apocalyptic world in which civilization has crumbled, a massive electromagnetic pulse has killed all children on the planet with the exception of Molly, the daughter of Jake Slater. Slater is also the only man immune to a virus released by the pulse.

== Cast ==
- Billy Zane as Master Crane
- Bruce Spence as Whippett
- Jack Thompson as Harris
- Stephen Hunter as MadCap
- Jake Ryan as Jake Slater
- Bolude Fakuade as Marion Connors
- Kendra Appleton as Clare
- Andy Trieu as Tech
- Barbera Hastings as Brooke "Babbling Brooke"
- Bryant Evans as Bearded Scientist
- Billie Rutherford as Molly
- Nathan Lee as Shu Yang
- Leah Baulch as Anesthetic Nurse
- T.K. Bell as Frozen Man In Vest

== Production ==
Matthew Reilly was the executive producer, with Ché Baker and Tim Maddocks as producers. It was directed by Ché Baker and Dallas Bland; and was written by Baker, Bland and Sarah Mason.

The film was largely shot around Canberra, Australia.
