= Melissa Thomas =

Australian actress

- Born: 1 November 1974 (age 51)
- Occupation: Actress
- Spouse: Peter Dunkley
- Children: 3

Melissa Thomas, is an Australian actress, notable for her roles in film and television, particularly in soap opera and serials.

== Career ==
Her film work as an extra includes: Ghost Town (2000), Swimming Upstream (2003), Thank God He Met Lizzie (1997), and Dallas Doll (1993).

Her television work includes roles in: Sweat (1996) playing Sandy Fricker, Late for School (1992) playing Lily Price, Brides of Christ (1991) playing Brigid Maloney, A Country Practice (1990), Family and Friends (1990), E Street (1989) and G.P. (1989) (non-speaking).

Thomas has also worked on Footballers' Wives (2002), All Saints (2003) (non-speaking role), Holy Cross (2003), and G:MT – Greenwich Mean Time, as well as presenting on Level 23 (1994), on The Defenders: Choice of Evil (1998).

She appeared in the Heath Ledger episode of E! True Hollywood Story, speaking about her former coworker.

== Personal life ==
Thomas is married to Sydney builder Peter Dunkley. They have three children. Thomas works as an interior designer for Dunkley's houses. Her work has been featured in Vogue and Belle.

== Filmography ==
=== Film ===
| Title | Year | Role | Type |
|---|---|---|---|
| Dallas Doll | 1994 | Margaret | Feature film |
| Thank God He Met Lizzie (aka The Wedding Party) | 1997 | Bridesmaid | Feature film |
| G:MT – Greenwich Mean Time | 1999 | | Feature film |
| Swimming Upstream | 2003 | Dawn Fraser | Feature film |
| Holy Cross | 2003 | | TV movie |
| Ghost Town | 2008 | Dr. Prashar's Patient | Feature film |

=== Television ===
| Title | Year | Role | Type |
|---|---|---|---|
| Family and Friends | 1990 | | TV series |
| A Country Practice | 1990 | Peta Thornton | TV series |
| G.P. | 1991 | Carly | TV series |
| Brides of Christ | 1991 | Brigid Maloney | TV miniseries |
| Late for School | 1992 | Lily Price | TV series |
| E Street | 1993 | Rebecca | TV series |
| A Country Practice | 1994 | Nicole Andrews | TV series |
| Level 23 | 1994 | Presenter | TV series |
| Sweat | 1996 | Sandy Fricker | TV series |
| The Defenders: Choice of Evil | 1998 | | |
| Footballers' Wives | 2002 | | TV series |
| All Saints | 2003 | Linda Thompson | TV series |
| E! True Hollywood Story | 2008 | Herself | TV series: (Heath Ledger episode |
