= Repetitor =

Serbian band

- Repetitor, from left to right: Milena Milutinović, Boris Vlastelica and Ana-Marija Cupin

Background information
- Origin: Belgrade, Serbia
- Genres: Alternative rock, indie rock, noise rock, garage rock, post-punk revival, post-hardcore
- Years active: 2005 – present
- Labels: Odličan Hrčak, KulturAkt, Moonlee Records
- Members: Boris Vlastelica; Ana-Marija Cupin; Milena Milutinović
- Website: Repetitor's Bandcamp Page

Repetitor (Serbian Cyrillic: Репетитор; trans. Repeater) is a Serbian alternative rock band from Belgrade.

The band was formed in 2005 by guitarist and vocalist Boris Vlastelica and drummer Milena Milutinović, who were soon joined by bass guitarist and vocalist Ana-Marija Cupin. The band's early performances gained them public attention, and their debut album, Sve što vidim je prvi put, was met with positive reactions by both the audience and the critics, making them one of the most prominent bands of the so-called New Serbian Scene.

== History ==
=== 2000s ===
The band was formed in Belgrade on Autumn of 2005 by Milena Milutinović (drums) and Boris Vlastelica (guitar, vocals), who had been playing together as a duo for a while, joined by Ana-Marija Cupin (bass, vocals). Without much skills at their own instruments, Repetitor started performing live after only a few months of rehearsing, during early 2006 at the Belgrade club Blue Moon. Soon after, they started performing frequently at various venues in Belgrade, Subotica, Novi Sad, Zrenjanin, Niš and Vranje. The band also performed abroad, in Skopje in Macedonia, Zagreb, Osijek and Pula in Croatia, and Banja Luka in Bosnia and Herzegovina, gaining fans and becoming a live attraction. In September 2006, the band performed at the Rock 'n' roll škola (School of Rock 'n' Roll) festival alongside Partibrejkers, Veliki Prezir, Neno Belan & Fiumens, Obojeni Program and Jarboli, and in December at the Jelen Pivo Live festival.

In January 2007, the band was pronounced by the webzine Popboks critics as the third greatest debut act of the year 2006. In August of the same year, Repetitor won the first place at the 11th Art & Music festival for the best regional non-affirmed band by both the audience and jury votes, and in September they appeared at the Jelen Pivo Live festival, held at the Kalemegdan fortress. During the same year, their first recording, the hit song "Ja" ("I"), produced by Ivan Pavlović, was released on the compilation album Jutro će promeniti sve? (Morning Would Change Everything?), maintaining the top position at the Radio B92 domestic singles chart for five weeks. The compilation was the first release of the so-called New Serbian Scene. The following year, the band appeared on another various artists compilation, Zdravo, zdravo, zdravo (Hello, Hello, Hello), released by KulturAkt, with the songs "10 puta nedeljno" ("10 Times A Week"), "Sve što vidim je prvi put" ("Everything I See Is For The First Time") and "Pukotine" ("Cracks").

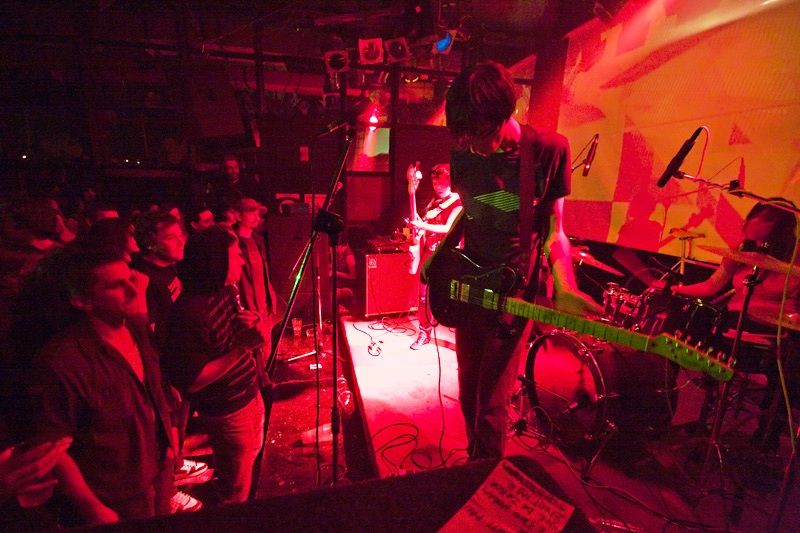
Repetitor performing live in Zagreb in 2009

The songs from both compilations appeared on their debut album, Sve što vidim je prvi put (Everything I See Is For The First Time), released by the Serbian independent record label Odličan Hrčak on October 30, 2008. The material, consisting of thirteen songs, was recorded at the Belgrade Digimedia Studio, during April 2008, and the Pula Partyzan Studio, in May and produced by Boris Mladenović of Jaboli and Velikir Prezir. The album brought positive critics, with the famous Serbian and former Yugoslav critic Dragan Ambrozić describing the album as "probably the most authentic celebration of the history of the domestic rock and roll ever, without outflanking anyone". Beside the CD edition of the album, it had also been released in mp3 format available for free digital download at the EXIT festival official site, as well as the band Myspace page.

After the album release, the band started a live promotion of the album, performing at the Jelen Pivo Live festival, before Jarboli, Električni Orgazam, Dinosaur Jr. and The Stooges, and the Nisomnia festival in Niš. In January 2009, the band appeared on the second place of the Ljubljana Radio Student list of the best albums of the year 2008. At the same time, on the Popboks critics' list annual for the year 2008, Sve što vidim je prvi put appeared at the third place on the best domestic albums list, the song "Opet jak" ("Strong Again") on the third place on the best domestic single and the promotional video for the song was voted as the best in 2008. The music video for the track "Opet jak", was directed by Miloš Tomić and recorded in stop motion technique at several locations in Belgrade from August until October 2008.

=== 2010s ===
In January 2010, the band released another promotional video, for the track "Ogledalo" ("The Mirror"), once again directed by Tomić, appearing on the second place of the Jelen Top 10 chart in April 2010. On July 9 of the same year, the band performed at the Novi Sad EXIT festival main stage. During the same year, remixes of the songs "Ja" and "Sve da zaboravim" appeared on the Shpira remix album As I Would Say Two, released by Exit Music. In January of the following year, the promotional video for the song "Ogledalo" was ranked as the second according to the audience, and third according to the critics on the Popboks annual list for the best music video. The following month, on the Popboks list of the best Serbian albums released in the previous decade, Sve što vidim je prvi put appeared on the 5th place and the compilation Jutro će promeniti sve appeared on the 16th place.

In December 2011, the band performed in Kosovo for the first time, on December 8 in Gračanica, on December 9 in Priština, and on December 10 in Leposavić. They were the first Serbian band to perform in Priština after more than ten years. On November 16, 2012, after a concert in Banja Luka club DFK, Vlastelica was attacked in front of the club by a group of skinheads, but suffered no serious injuries.

On November 29, 2012, the band released the new studio album, entitled Dobrodošli na okean (Welcome to the Ocean). The album, announced by the single "U pravom trenutku" ("In the Right Time"), was released on CD, on vinyl and for free download. It was followed by tours in the period 2012–2016, which included concerts in Croatia, Slovenia, Netherlands, Italy, Switzerland, France, Germany, Poland, Czech Republic, Slovakia, Romania, Austria, Russia, The Baltic States and China.

In October 2016, the band released their latest studio album entitled Gde ćeš (Where Are You Going) through Slovenian independent record label Moonlee Records. The album was followed by concerts in former Yugoslav countries, Slovakia, Czech Republic, Netherlands and Austria. On June 30, 2017, they had a performance in Belgrade District Prison. The video for the song "Ako te ikad" ("If You Ever") was recorded on the performance. The band announced the release of a documentary film about the performance.

== Legacy ==
The lyrics of the songs "Ja" ("I") and "Pukotine" ("Cracks") were featured in Petar Janjatović's book Pesme bratstva, detinjstva & potomstva: Antologija ex YU rok poezije 1967 - 2007 (Songs of Brotherhood, Childhood & Offspring: Anthology of Ex YU Rock Poetry 1967 - 2007), Repetitor being the youngest act whose lyrics are featured in the book.

== Discography ==
=== Studio albums ===
- Sve što vidim je prvi put (2008)
- Dobrodošli na okean (2012)
- Gde ćeš (2016)
- Prazan prostor među nama koji može i da ne postoji (2020)

=== Other appearances ===
- "Ja" (Jutro ce promeniti sve?; 2007)
- "10 puta nedeljno" / "Sve što vidim je prvi put" / "Pukotine" (Zdravo, zdravo, zdravo; 2008)
- "Ja" (Shpira temporary remix)" / "Sve da zaboravim (Shpira remix)" (As I Would Say Two; 2010)
