= Sweat (Australian TV series) =

Australian drama television series

- Genre: Teen drama
- Created by: John Rapsey
- Starring: Martin Henderson; Inge Hornstra; Melissa Thomas; Tai Nguyen; Tahnie Merrey; Heath Bergersen; Heath Ledger; Matt Castelli; Mouche Phillips; Paul Tassone
- Opening theme: "San E Wireless" by Christine Anu
- Composer: Cezary Skubiszewski
- Country of origin: Australia
- Original language: English
- No. of seasons: 1
- No. of episodes: 26

Production
- Executive producer: Paul Barron
- Producers: Margot McDonald; Paul Barron
- Cinematography: Ulrich Krafzik
- Running time: 24–25 minutes
- Production company: Barron Entertainment

Original release
- Network: Network 10
- Release: 20 April – 19 November 1996

Sweat is an Australian drama television series created by John Rapsey and produced by Barron Entertainment in association with the Australian Broadcasting Corporation in Perth. The show aired on Network 10 in 1996 for one season of 26 episodes and centred on students at an Australian school for the athletically gifted. In early 1997, Ten announced that they had no plans for a second season.

Scenes were shot in and around Perth including locations such as Perth High Performance Centre, Arena Joondalup, the Town of Cambridge, the now defunct Perry Lakes Stadium and the Perth SpeedDome.

== Cast ==
=== Main cast ===
- Martin Henderson as Tom Nash
- Inge Hornstra as Tatyana "Tats" Alecsandri
- Melissa Thomas as Sandy Fricker
- Tai Nguyen as Nhon "Noodle" Huong Tran
- Tahnie Merrey as Evie Hogan
- Heath Bergersen as Stewie Perkins
- Heath Ledger as Snowy Bowles
- Matt Castelli as Danny Rodriguez
- Paul Tassone as Don Majors

=== Additional cast ===
- Peter Hardy as Sid O'Reilly
- Frederique Fouche as Jenny Forrest
- Claire Sprunt as Leila Rasheed
- Louise Miller as Sophie Mills
- Quintin George as Greg Rosso
- James Sollis as Chris Wheeler

=== Recurring cast ===
- Gillian Berry as Norma O'Malley (15 episodes)
- Natalie Saleeba as Monique Bellanger (4 episodes)
- Jason Colby as Alex (4 episodes)

=== Guest cast ===
- Zach Justin as Athlete #2 (1 episode) / Matt (2 episodes)
- Simon Baker-Denny as Paul Steadman (1 episode)
- Mouche Phillips as Robyn Barry (1 episode)
- Vivienne Garrett as Mary Rodriguez (1 episode)
- Rod Nunez as Rollo (2 episodes)
- Toby Schmitz as Cameron (3 episodes)
- Michael Loney as Frank Frisker (1 episode)
- Sonia Vinci as Reporter (1 episode)
- Keagan Kang as Richard (1 episode)
- Michael Paget as Scott Davis (2 episodes)
- Mark McAullay as ASDA official (2 episodes)
- Igor Sas as Kev Lindwell (1 episode)
- Marta Kaczmarek as Marta (1 episode)
- Robyn Cruze as Shelley (2 episodes)
- Zoe Ventoura as a dancer (1 episode)

== Episodes ==
No.	Title	Directed by	Written by	Original release date
1	"Episode 1"	Steve Jodrell	John Rapsey	20 April 1996
2	"Episode 2"	Steve Jodrell	Gary Heary	20 April 1996
3	"Episode 3"	Dan Burstall	Matt Ford	27 April 1996
4	"Episode 4"	Dan Burstall	Rick Maier	27 April 1996
5	"Episode 5"	Dan Burstall	Chris McCourt	4 May 1996
6	"Episode 6"	Malcolm McDonald	Peter Gawler	4 May 1996
7	"Episode 7"	Malcolm McDonald	John Chamberlain	11 May 1996
8	"Episode 8"	Dan Burstall	Pim Hendrix	11 May 1996
9	"Episode 9"	Malcolm McDonald	May Harrison	18 May 1996
10	"Episode 10"	Malcolm McDonald	Matt Ford	18 May 1996
11	"Episode 11"	Malcolm McDonald	Robyn Sinclair	25 May 1996
12	"Episode 12"	Malcolm McDonald	Karin Altmann	25 May 1996
13	"Episode 13"	Karl Zwicky	Gina Roncoli	1 June 1996
14	"Episode 14"	Karl Zwicky	John Rapsey	8 June 1996
15	"Episode 15"	Ross Hutchens	Robyn Sinclair	15 June 1996
16	"Episode 16"	Ross Hutchens	Grant Fraser	22 June 1996
17	"Episode 17"	Malcolm McDonald	David Phillips	29 June 1996
18	"Episode 18"	Malcolm McDonald	Daniel Krige	6 July 1996
19	"Episode 19"	Steve Jodrell	David Phillips	13 June 1996
20	"Episode 20"	Steve Jodrell	Robyn Sinclair	20 June 1996
21	"Episode 21"	Karl Zwicky	Robyn Sinclair	27 June 1996
22	"Episode 22"	Karl Zwicky	Jo Merle	12 November 1996
23	"Episode 23"	Malcolm McDonald	Pim Hendrix	13 November 1996
24	"Episode 24"	Malcolm McDonald	Jo Horsburgh	14 November 1996
25	"Episode 25"	Karl Zwicky	Neville Brown	18 November 1996
26	"Episode 26"	Karl Zwicky	John Rapsey	19 November 1996

== International broadcasts ==
- Ireland – RTÉ Two (1996–1997)
- England – CITV (1997, 2001)
