= Vuneny =

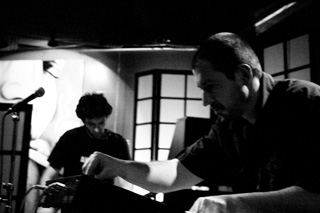
- Vuneny.

Background information
- Origin: Mostar, Bosnia and Herzegovina
- Genres: Post-rock, experimental, electronic
- Years active: 2003–present
- Labels: Buybook, Moonlee, Jarring Effects
- Members: Andrijan Zovko; Nedim Ćišić

Vuneny are an experimental band, formed in 2003 as "electro-acoustic" project. Continuously experimenting with the sound, Vuneny perform and implement music collaborating with different artists and music forms, metamorphosing itself into dynamic "work in progress" constantly upgrade and disperse.

== Discography ==
- Play that Silence – Buybook (BiH), 2004, Zvuk Mochvare (HR), 2004
- V2 – Moonlee Records (SLO, HR), Buybook (BiH), 2006
- "Whatever Singularity" – Jarring Effects (FR), 2009

== Projects ==
- Original live soundtrack – Le Revelateur, Philippe Garrel (1968.), 2003
- Movement for airports transistor remixes – Remix of Ultra-red (USA), 2004
- Cine-concert – music for silent movie Paris Qui Dort (by René Clair, 1925.), 2005
- Kompozicije – nine musical pieces for quotes by Ivo Andrić, 2006
- Individual Utopias by Lala Raščić – music by Vuneny, 2008
