= In Your Dreams (2013 TV series) =

- Main cast
- Genre: Children's; Comedy-Drama
- Written by: John Armstrong; Tim Gooding; Kym Goldsworthy; Julie Miller
- Directed by: Ralph Strasser
- Starring: Tessa de Josselin; David Delmenico; Soma Pysall; Jorn Knebel; Bardiya McKinnon
- Countries of origin: Australia, Germany
- Original language: English
- No. of series: 2
- No. of episodes: 52

Production
- Executive producers: Noel Price; Sue Keating; Ole Kampovski
- Producer: Noel Price
- Running time: 24 minutes
- Production companies: Southern Star Entertainment; TVPlus Germany

Original release
- Network: 7TWO
- Release: 22 November 2013 – 26 January 2014

In Your Dreams (also known as Sommer Deines Lebens) is an Australian teen comedy-drama television series that was first screened on the Seven Network's digital channel 7TWO from 22 November 2013 to 27 December 2013. A second season, known as In Your Dreams 2, was screened from 15 June 2014. The series is a Southern Star Entertainment Production for NDR Germany and the Seven Network Australia.

== Synopsis ==
Australian teenaged twins, Samantha and Benjamin Hazelton, spend the summer with their eccentric, aristocratic relatives, the von Hasenburg family, who live in the remote German Schoneburg Castle. The family fortune has dwindled to almost nothing, so Sam and Ben must help them save the castle and turn their fortunes around before bankruptcy descends and centuries of von Hassenburg entitlement come to an end.

== Cast ==
- Tessa de Josselin as Sam
- David Delmenico as Ben
- Jörn Knebel as Baron Philipp
- Lars Kokemüller as Marcus
- Soma Alusia Pysall as Lili
- Kendra Appleton as Sophie
- Bardiya McKinnon as Jack
- Raechelle Banno as Courtney
- Mia Morrissey as Lucy
- Patrick Phillips as Rude File Clerk
- Anna-Lena Schwing as Mia
