= I Know How Many Runs You Scored Last Summer =

- DVD cover
- Directed by: Stacey Edmonds; Doug Turner
- Written by: Stacey Edmonds; Doug Turner
- Produced by: Stacey Edmonds; Doug Turner
- Starring: Jai Koutrae
- Music by: Dallas Johnson
- Production company: Media42
- Distributed by: Anchor Bay Entertainment
- Release date: 2008
- Running time: 79 minutes
- Country: Australia
- Language: English

I Know How Many Runs You Scored Last Summer is a 2008 Australian low-budget comedy horror film written and directed by Stacey Edmonds and Doug Turner.

== Plot ==
Three amateur cricketers, Wallis, Blake and Peacock, are found murdered, items of cricket equipment being the murder weapons, and after Boyd is bashed to death in a toilet cubicle with a cricket bat, police begin to suspect a serial killer. The victims had once been members of an under-12 boys' team involved in a bullying scandal. Surviving members of the team are taken by police to a "safe house" at Joadja for their protection, but are soon disobeying their orders, and one by one are picked off in gruesome and humiliating ways by a lanky moustachioed killer in traditional cricketers' apparel (cream trousers, jumper and bucket hat), later identified as Phil Philips, the target of the bullying. Much of the mayhem is occasioned by a cricket ball turned to a deadly missile by insertion of six-inch nails, and by stumps with sharpened steel points. The action is interrupted for a gratuitous steamy shower scene, where Reynolds is played by Arianna Starr, a 'Miss Nude Australia'. The two police supervising the safe house are killed by Philips and Reynolds, who is revealed as not a police detective but Philips' sister and illicit lover.

== Cast ==
- Jai Koutrae as DS Gary Chance
- Stacey Edmonds as DS Kim Reynolds

(her body double in the shower scene played by Arianna Starr)

- Az Jackson as PI Shane Scott
- Robert Ramka as Danny Danger (strangled with jockstrap)
- David Gambin as David Yeo (fitted with spiked box, then triple-staked by set of stumps)
- Ben Paul Owens as Terry O'Sullivan (whipped, gagged by spiked ball then staked)
- Sarah Linton as Belinda Berry (Terry's dominatrix girlfriend - escaped)
- Aaron Scully as Craig Stedman (throat slit by steel point of stump)
- Alex Sideratos as Jonathan Wiley (staked by cricket stump)
- James Winter as Matthew King (eviscerated by wicket keeper's glove fitted with blades)
- Doug Turner, Otto Heutling as Phil Philips

The film was shot in Sydney and at Joadja. Copyright is owned by Media42.

Original score by Dallas Johnson The film also uses recordings by:

- Luke A. Edwards for "Settle the Score"
- Hell City Glamours for "Broke Down"; "White Trash, Hot Love"; "My Heart's a-Breakin'"; "Pretty Far from Perfect"
- Mortal Sin for "Out of the Darkness"; "Say Your Prayers"; "Dead Man Walking"
- Vox Mortis for "Chorus of Approval"

== Reception ==
The film was given one of the shorter reviews in a 2017 roundup of cricketing films by The Cricketer:

I Know How Many Runs You Scored Last Summer (2008) – A rather-amusing-sounding Australian slasher flick featuring a serial killer who uses bats, stumps, a spiked box and a wicketkeeping glove.

== Home media ==
I Know How Many Runs You Scored Last Summer was released to DVD in Australia by Anchor Bay Entertainment (cat. STZ1229)

== See also ==
I Know What You Did Last Summer 1997 American slasher film
