= Jai Koutrae =

Australian actor (born 1975)

- Koutrae winning his Method Fest Award for Best Actor in a Short Film
- Born: 1 December 1975 (age 50); Sydney, Australia
- Awards: Australian Screen Actors Guild Award for Best Actor in a Short Film 2007 Death's Requiem; Method Fest Award for Best Actor in a Short Film; 2007 Death's Requiem; Luciania Film Festival Award for Best Actor 2004 Somewhere Near Kokoda

Jai Koutrae is an Australian actor who gained fame for his role as Nathan Chapel in Death's Requiem, which garnered him an Australian Screen Actors Guild Award. Koutrae has starred in many other successful short and feature films, including Mortal Fools. He has also appeared in many television series such as McLeod's Daughters, All Saints, and Home and Away.

== Biography ==
=== Early career ===
Koutrae's acting career began in 1999, when he was cast in the small role of Rowan Stables on the television show Home and Away. He enjoyed working on the show for a few episodes and decided to audition for the medical show All Saints.

== Filmography ==
Year	Format	Title	Role	Notes
1999	TV	Home and Away	Rowan Staples	Starred in episode 1.2671
2000	TV	All Saints	Jack	Starred in episode Another Place, Another Time
2001	Film	Neophytes and Neon Lights	Barry	
2003	Film	Watermark	Jim	
2004	Short film	Somewhere Near Kokoda	Max	
2007	Short Film	Death's Requiem	Nathan Chapel	Lead role
2009	Feature Film	I Know How Many Runs You Scored Last Summer	DS Gary Chance	Lead role
2012	Web series	Sync	Dr J. R. Wyatt	Produced by and published on the "Bammo" channel on YouTube
2019	Feature Film	Terminus	David Chamberlain	Lead role
2020	Feature Film	Never Too Late	Williams	
2021	Feature Film	Shadow Wars	Ezekiel	
2021	TV	Dive Club	Chief Jack Rose	Series Regular
2022	TV	Firebite	Spud	
