= Terminus (2015 film) =

- Theatrical release poster
- Directed by: Marc Furmie
- Written by: Marc Furmie; Shiyan Zheng; Gabriel Dowrick
- Produced by: Brett Thornquest; Tim Maddocks
- Starring: Jai Koutrae; Kendra Appleton; Todd Lasance; Bren Foster
- Cinematography: Kieran Fowler
- Edited by: Gabriel Dowrick
- Music by: Brian Cachia
- Production company: Storm Vision Entertainment
- Distributed by: Vertical Entertainment
- Release date: 9 June 2015
- Running time: 94 minutes
- Country: Australia
- Language: English

Terminus is a 2015 Australian science-fiction drama film directed by Marc Furmie, who wrote it with Shiyan Zheng and Gabriel Dowrick. It stars Jai Koutrae, Todd Lasance, Bren Foster, and Kendra Appleton. Terminus tells the story of David, a small-town American who has a near-fatal accident after coming in contact with a meteorite. The meteorite has properties that have enormous implications for mankind.

The film was made on a small budget in Sydney, with a predominantly Australian cast. It has been praised for its character introspection and classic sci-fi feel.

== Plot ==
Reports of a downed extraterrestrial object gain the attention of U.S. government agents. Although disappointed that they find no living specimens, the agents take an "eyewitness" into custody to observe him after they find he is no longer blind.

David Chamberlain, a mechanic who has not recovered from the death of his wife Jane, struggles to keep his job. Zach, a veteran of a war currently ongoing in Iran, asks for a job, though David must turn him down. David later helps Zach in a bar fight, learning that Zach is missing a leg. When David returns home, his daughter Annabelle tells him that his last two payments failed to go through, and she has been forced to return home from college.

Upset, David takes a car ride and crashes after seeing an object streak down from the sky. When David fails to return home the next morning, Annabelle looks for him. She finds him wandering near his crashed car and takes him to the hospital. A doctor informs Annabelle that David inexplicably has two functioning kidneys even though records show that one was removed in the past to transplant into his wife, which was rejected by her body - presumably leading to her death. Now obsessed with the object, David becomes convinced it is giving him instructions through his dead wife. The agents supervise surgery on the eyewitness and argue with their supervisor to continue their research, as he tells them that the continuing war in Iran is necessary to raise the country's morale and takes precedence over any possible evidence of extraterrestrial contact.

David hires Zach to help him retrieve the object. As they do so, Zach touches it and becomes unnerved by the feedback. While protesting the advancing war amid reports that Russia, China, and France have threatened retaliation against the U.S. push into Iran, Zach experiences pain in his amputated leg. When he realizes that his leg is slowly regrowing, he returns to David to demand an explanation. David tells Annabelle and Zach about the object and insists that Zach must be brought into proximity of it. Zach's leg rapidly regenerates, causing him to join David's quest to create a large structure David believes the object wants built. They steal materials from a local junkyard, putting everything in an abandoned factory.

The agents, lured by reports of unexplained regeneration, come to David's house. Though David initially denies any knowledge, when they confront him with the hospital records, he says the object melted. Disbelieving him, the agents tail David, only to lose him when his friend Tony Cerillo helps. As the conflict in Iran escalates, David comes to believe the structure will save Annabelle from the oncoming nuclear war. When Cerillo investigates the missing materials from the junkyard, he confronts David, who accidentally kills him. Filled with remorse, David confides to Jane that he believes himself unworthy of the object, and she confirms that it was meant for others, whom David must assist.

Government scientists inform the agents that the object is an example of abiogenesis. Frustrated with delays, the agents return to David's house, where they take Zach and Annabelle hostage. David rescues them as they begin torturing Zach. As they escape, Agent Stipe shoots Annabelle, knowing David will return to the object to heal her. There, Agent Stipe shoots David. His subordinate, Agent Lubinski, objects, saying that the object should not be used to further the war effort. Zach, Stipe, and Lubinski engage in a firefight, and all are wounded. David helps Zach and Annabelle into the structure, apologizes for not being able to join them, and seals them in it just as a nuclear war begins. When Zach and Annabelle emerge, having been apparently cryogenically suspended, the world is in ruins apart from the structure - rusted and overgrown with vegetation and insect life suggesting that centuries have passed.

== Cast ==
- Jai Koutrae as David Chamberlain
- Kendra Appleton as Annabelle Chamberlain
- Todd Lasance as Zach
- Bren Foster as Agent Stipe
- Brendan Clearkin as Ned Wilcox
- Vincent Andriano as O'Mally
- William Emmons as Agent Lubinski
- Katherine Hicks as Jane Chamberlain
- Steve Le Marquand as Sherriff Williams
- John Manning as Tony Cerillo

== Production ==
Terminus was produced by Storm Vision Entertainment, Eclectik Vision, Storm Alley Entertainment, and Maddfilms. It was filmed in Sydney and Portland, New South Wales.

== Release ==
Terminus had its world premiere as an official selection at the Sci-Fi-London Film Festival on 9 June 2015. The worldwide rights were acquired by Vertical Entertainment, and the film was made available globally on digital platforms on the US theatrical launch of 22 January 2016.

== Reception ==
The Hollywood Reporter wrote that Terminus is "more sophisticated than the typical sci-fi offering" and praised director Marc Furmie for "achieving a lot with a low budget", although they also said that Terminus suffers for being "ultimately too low-key." This "low-key" trait, however, was seen as a positive by Quiet Earth, who praised the film: "With a stripped-down, minimal aesthetic, focus on developing characters and relationships, and an ever-present sense of tension, doom, and dread... it essentially stands as an enjoyably creative and well-executed thriller, with plenty of original ideas and several eye-catching performances." Twitch Film was less enthused, writing, "it strives for a very ambitious place in the universe but lacks what it takes to get there." SciFiNow praised the film, saying Terminus has "great nostalgia for old-school science-fiction cinema" and that "you won’t be disappointed with Terminus."
