= Watermark (2003 film) =

- Directed by: Georgina Willis
- Written by: Georgina Willis; Kerry Rock
- Produced by: Kerry Rock
- Starring: Jai Koutrae; Sandra Stockley; Ruth McDonald
- Cinematography: Paul Kolsky
- Edited by: Kerry Rock; Georgina Willis
- Music by: Allyson Newman
- Release date: 2003
- Running time: 76 minutes
- Country: Australia
- Language: English

Watermark is a 2003 Australian film directed by Georgina Willis and produced by Kerry Rock. It screened at Directors' Fortnight at 2003's Cannes film festival.

== Cast ==
- Jai Koutrae as Jim
- Sandra Stockley as Louise
- Ruth McDonald as Catherine
- Ellouise Rothwell as Jasmin

== Reception ==
Adrian Martin of The Age gave Watermark a very negative review, leading producer Kerry Rock to threaten to sue Martin and The Age. Martin had called it "an inept, abysmal movie in every department" and said it was "another case study of what can go so terribly wrong in Australian movies."

The Courier Mail gave it two stars, stating, "The film is moody and keeps its distance, which doesn't make the drama particularly involving." Herald Sun's Leigh Paatsch also gave it 2 stars writing "To get to Watermark's best scenes — which meaningfully meander about what element of the past might be haunting a middle-aged family man — the viewer has to wade through an ocean of pretentious piffle." Tom Ryan of the Sunday Age gave it two stars and said "Watermark suffers from stilted performances (for which the cast may or may not be responsible) and from a studied artiness". Writing in Variety, David Stratton said, "the film’s at times confusing structure and the cliches in which it dabbles will make it difficult to attract a significant audience." The Age's Jim Schembri dismissed the film with a review that read in its entirety "See paragraph above." The paragraph referred to was the end of his review of Somersault which closed "The one thing that seems to be distinguishing so many Australian films at the moment is that they are populated by characters who have nothing of interest to say or do about anything. We seize upon each new feature hoping to find renewed vibrancy and vision, and so offer some spark of hope for the future of a film industry that seems to have developed a powerful aversion to connecting with audiences. This isn't one of them."
