= Level 23 =

Australian television series

Level 23 is an Australian lifestyle program that aired briefly on Network Ten in 1994. The show featured stories and interviews about a range of youth lifestyle issues.

== Presenters ==
- Brent Meyer
- Anja Coleby
- Nathan Harvey
- Nic Testoni
- Melissa Thomas

== See also ==
- List of Australian television series
