= Jake Ryan (Australian actor) =

Australian actor (born 1983)

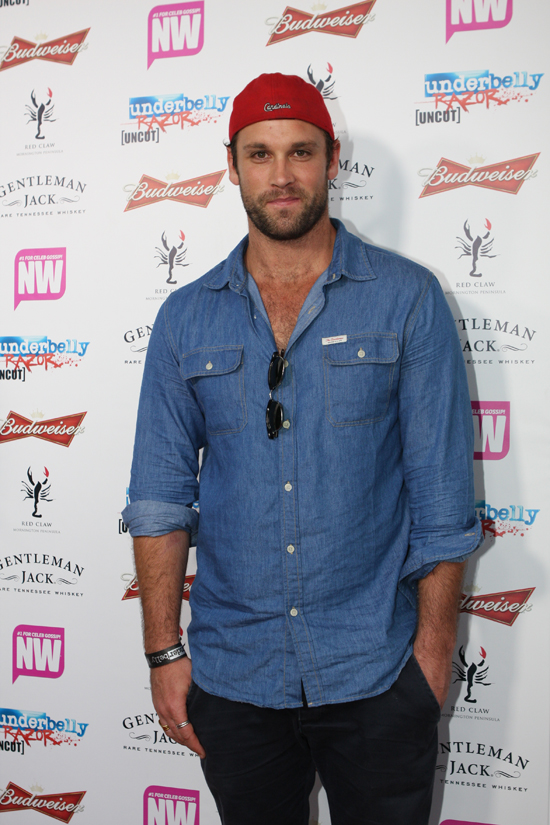
- Ryan in 2011
- Born: 2 September 1983 (age 43); Melbourne, Australia
- Occupation: Actor
- Years active: 2003–present
- Notable work: Home and Away
- Partner: Alice Quiddington
- Children: 2

Jake Ryan (born 2 September 1983) is an Australian actor. He was a member of the Australian national Taekwondo team for eight years, before an injury led him to pursue a career in acting. Since 2003, he has appeared in various feature films and television series. He played the recurring roles of Ray "The Blizzard" Blissett in Underbelly (2011) and Harry Smith in Wentworth (2013–2015). He played Robbo in the Seven Network soap opera Home and Away from 2017 to 2020.

== Early life ==
Jake Ryan was born in Melbourne, in 1983. During his childhood, he trained in Taekwondo, earning his black belt at the age of nine, making him the youngest person in Australia to do so at the time. He was a member of the Australian national team for eight years, and a ten-time champion, ranking fourth best in the world on three occasions. He pursued a dream to compete in the 2008 Summer Olympics in Beijing, however, following a knee injury one year prior, he withdrew. Ryan later took an interest in acting, and having trained with such actors as Bill Hunter, he graduated from The Actors' Centre in Sydney following two years of study, followed by extended training at Practical Aesthetics.

== Career ==
Ryan commenced his acting career in 2003, when he first appeared in the short film Trouble in Paradise, before receiving a minor role in his first feature film, in the 2005 Indian romantic comedy, Salaam Namaste. This was followed by appearances in films including, The Sapphires, with Chris O'Dowd and Deborah Mailman, the 2013 adaptation of The Great Gatsby, with Leonardo DiCaprio, and Blue World Order, which stars Billy Zane, while his television credits consist of recurring roles in Underbelly, House Husbands, and a notable appearance in the Foxtel prison drama series, Wentworth (a reimagining of the classic Network Ten prison drama Prisoner), in which he played Harry Smith, the abusive husband of leading character Bea Smith (Danielle Cormack), for which Cormack's character was sentenced for the attempted murder of Harry. His duration in the series lasted from 2013 to 2015 when his character was killed-off. He also appeared in three episodes of the short-lived horror web television series Wolf Creek, which was based on the popular films Wolf Creek and Wolf Creek 2.

In 2016 Ryan was cast in Australian soap opera Home and Away as Robbo, a man who suddenly appears in Summer Bay with amnesia, and having no recollection of prior events. His true identity is revealed as Ryan Shaw, a federal police officer, during the run-up to the 2017 season finale. He made his first appearance on 25 July 2017 during the 30th season. For the role, Ryan lost 13 kg ahead of filming. In addition, Ryan appeared in the 30th anniversary special documentary, Endless Summer: 30 Years of Home and Away, which screened on the Seven Network on 17 July 2018.

In late 2018, Ryan took a brief hiatus from Home and Away, when he was cast in the leading role of New Zealand film Savage, directed by Sam Kelly and was inspired by real-life Kiwi street gangs. He departed Home and Away during the 90-minute opening episode of the 33rd season, which aired on 27 January 2020. His character was killed off following a car accident. Ryan decided to leave, as he did not think there was much more for his character to do. In 2021 Ryan appeared in the feature film Streamline.

In August 2022, Ryan was announced in the line-up of Matthew Holmes' period-set shark thriller Fear Below opposite English actress Hermione Corfield. On 19 July 2024, Ryan was named as part of the cast for the Netflix series Territory.

== Personal life ==
An avid artist, Ryan plans to open his own exhibition in future.

Ryan has been in a relationship with Alice Quiddington, a DJ, since early 2019, and with whom he has two children, a son, born on 6 October 2019 and a daughter born on 23 December 2023. Ryan and Quiddington announced their engagement in April 2021.

== Filmography ==
Key
†	Denotes films that have not yet been released

=== Film ===
Year	Title	Role	Notes
2005	Salaam Namaste	Groom	
2006	BoyTown	Family Pub Barman	
2012	The Sapphires	Cochese (uncredited)	
2013	The Great Gatsby	Motorcycle Cop	
2017	Out of the Shadows	Charles Winter	
2017	Blue World Order	Jake Slater	
2019	Colourblind	The Hitman	
2019	Savage	Damage	
2021	Streamline	Dave Bush	
2021	Wyrmwood: Apocalypse	The Colonel	
2023	Kane	Kane	(also executive producer)
2024	Life After Fighting	Wayne Creylan	
2024	Take My Hand	Russell	
2024	My Melbourne	Chef Leon	
2026	War Machine		
TBA	Fear Below †	Dylan "Bull" Maddock	Completed
TBA	Homeward †	Dave	Post-production
TBA	Primitive War †	TBA	Post-production

=== Television ===
Year	Title	Role	Notes
2011	Underbelly	Ray "The Blizzard" Blissett	Season 4: Razor (recurring, 10 episodes)
2012	House Husbands	Zeeban	Episode: "Harmony Day"
2013	Mr & Mrs Murder	Stuart Dinklage	Episode: "En Vogue"
2013–2015	Wentworth	Harry Smith	Recurring, 8 episodes
2014	Fat Tony & Co.	Mark Moran	Episode: "The Tony Special"
2016	Wolf Creek	Johnny	3 episodes
2016	Traffik	Edmund	TV pilot (not picked up)
2017	The Leftovers	Bloke	Episode: "G'Day Melbourne"
2017–2020	Home and Away	Robbo	Main role
2021	Amazing Grace	Tyrone	Episode #1.4
2021	Nine Perfect Strangers	Buster	Episode: "Brave New World"
2021	The Moth Effect	Policeman/Brent	5 episodes
2022	Wolf Like Me	Shane	Episode #1.6
2023	Last King of the Cross	Gibbo	Episode #1.2
2023	Ten Pound Poms	Billy	4 episodes
2023	NCIS: Sydney	Nails	Episode: "Brothers in Arms"
2024	Territory	Daniel Lawson	6 episodes

== Taekwondo record ==
Taekwondo record
5 wins, 5 loss, 0 draws
Year	Result	Opponent	Venue	Location	Points
2000	Win	(Turkey) Gökhan Soysal	World Championships	Killarney, Queensland	6–4
2000	Loss	(United States) Jason McEuin	World Championships	Killarney, Queensland	2–1
2003	Win	(Afghanistan) Ferhad Argandewoll	World Championships	Garmisch-Partenkirchen, Bavaria	8–0
2003	Loss	(South Africa) Donald Ravenscroft	World Championships	Garmisch-Partenkirchen, Bavaria	5–4
2005	Win	(Romania) Razvan Nedelcu	World Championships	Madrid, Spain	4–1
2005	Win	(Slovenia) Marcel More	World Championships	Madrid, Spain	10–9
2005	Loss	(Spain) Ruben Montesinos	World Championships	Madrid, Spain	5–3
2006	Loss	(Kazakhstan) Sagynysh Kalimbetov	Asian Championships	Bangkok, Thailand	Unknown
2006	Win	(Denmark) Zakaria Asidah	World Cup	Bangkok, Thailand	1–0
2006	Loss	(Taiwan) Po-Hao Kuo	World Cup	Bangkok, Thailand	1–0
Legend: Win Loss Draw/No contest Notes
