= Kendra Appleton =

Australian actress

- Born: Kendra Appleton; 1995; Shoalhaven, New South Wales, Australia
- Occupation: Actress
- Years active: 2013–present

Kendra Appleton (born 1995) is an Australian actress known for her roles in the television series In Your Dreams and the film Terminus.

== Early life ==
The daughter of Graham and Debra Appleton, Appleton grew up on a farm at Conjola in Shoalhaven, on the south coast of New South Wales. As a teenager, Appleton attended St John the Evangelist Catholic High School in Nowra until June 2012 before landing the role of Sophie in In Your Dreams. While filming this series in Germany, Appleton studied for her higher school certificate by distance education and sat for her examinations within 48 hours of returning to Australia, achieving 72.45 for her Australian Tertiary Admission Rank.

== Personal life ==
Appleton holds a firearm licence and has won junior competitions in target shooting.

Appleton is currently studying a Bachelor of Arts, majoring in Creative Writing & English Literature.

== Career ==
Appleton got her first taste of acting on screen when she was 14, in the 2009 US fan film Horrible Turn. Appleton had a number of small roles in various television series before landing a major role at 17 in the teen drama In Your Dreams, screened on the Seven Network (Australia) in 2013. At 20, Appleton made her major film debut in the 2015 science-fiction film Terminus. Appleton was to portray the character Clare in the science-fiction film Blue World Order scheduled for release in 2016.

Appleton is represented by Kermond Management.

== Filmography ==
Film
| Year | Title | Role | Notes |
|---|---|---|---|
| 2009 | Horrible Turn | Marla Singer | |
| 2015 | Terminus | Annabelle Chamberlain | |
| 2017 | Blue World Order | Clare | |

Television
| Year | Title | Role | Notes |
|---|---|---|---|
| 2010 | Me and My Monsters | Harriett | Episode: "Sleepover" |
| 2011 | Rescue Special Ops | Odette | Episode: "Secrets and Lies" |
| 2013 | In Your Dreams | Sophie | Series regular (season one); 28 episodes |
