= Death's Requiem =

2007 short film

Death’s Requiem
- Directed by: Marc Furmie
- Written by: Marc Furmie; Ji Hao Lou
- Produced by: Tim Maddocks
- Starring: Jai Koutrae
- Cinematography: Carl Robertson
- Production company: Maddfilms
- Release date: 2007
- Country: Australia
- Language: English

Death's Requiem is an Australian 2007 short film. It tells of Nathan Chapel, a terminally ill comic book artist with an obsession for death. But When the Grim Reaper himself pays Nathan comes to life to haunt him, Nathan's greatest fears are realized.

The film was produced with financing from Screen Australia.

== Cast ==
- Raoul Agapis as Death
- Darren K. Hawkins as The Removalist
- Jai Koutrae as Nathan
- Billy Milionis as Joe
- Tai Nguyen as Cigarette Seller
- Robin Royce Queree as Homeless Man (as Robin Queree)
- Bruce Spence as John
- Alin Sumarwata as Sarah

== Awards ==
The film was nominated for and received several awards:

Award	Recipient	Awarding Body	Year	Status	Ref
SA & WA Gold Award, Fictional Drama Short	Carl Robertson	Australian Cinematographers Society	2007	Winner	
Best Entry (SA & WA)	Carl Robertson	Australian Cinematographers Society	2007	Winner	
Best Achievement in Sound for a Short Film	Stephen J. Hope & David Glasser	Australian Screen Sound Guild	2007	Winner	
Best Actor	Jai Koutrae	Method Fest	2007	Winner	
Best Short Film	Marc Furmie	Method Fest	2007	Nominee	
Best Cinematography	Carl Robertson	Shriekfest	2007	Winner	
Best Super Short Film	Marc Furmie	Shriekfest	2007	Nominee	
Best Short Film	Marc Furmie	Flickerfest	2008	Nominee	
Best Achievement in Cinematography	Carl Robertson	St. Kilda Film Festival	2007	Winner	
Best Short Film	Marc Furmie	St. Kilda Film Festival	2007	Nominee	
Best Short Filme	Marc Furmie	Eerie Horror Fest	2007	Nominee	
Best Short Film	Marc Furmie	Lucania Film Festival	2022	Nominee	
Best Actor	Jai Koutrae	Lucania Film Festival	2008	Winner	
