= Sve što vidim je prvi put =

Studio album by Repetitor
- Released: October 30, 2008
- Recorded: 2008, Digimedia studio, Belgrade; Partyzan studio, Pula
- Genre: Alternative rock, indie rock, noise rock, garage rock, post-punk revival
- Length: 37:52
- Label: Odličan Hrčak _{CD006}
- Producer: Boris Mladenović, Goran Crevar, Ivo Lorencin

Repetitor chronology
Jutro će promeniti sve? (2005)	Sve što vidim je prvi put (2008)	Dobrodošli na okean (2012)

Professional ratings
Review scores
Source	Rating
Mikrofonija	Favorable link^{[usurped]}
Muzika.hr	link
Popboks	link
Radio Student	Favorable link
RTVSLO.si	link

Sve što vidim je prvi put (Everything I See Is For The First Time) is the debut album by the Serbian alternative rock band Repetitor released by the Odličan Hrčak independent record label in 2008.

== Track listing ==
All music written by Repetitor, all lyrics written by Boris Vlastelica.

No.	Title	Length
1.	"Opet jak" (Strong Again)	2:36
2.	"Pukotine" (Cracks)	2:43
3.	"Ogledalo" (The Mirror)	2:11
4.	"Slamčica" (A Straw)	3:44
5.	"Izbrisati prijatelja" (Deleting a Friend)	2:00
6.	"Ja" (I)	2:11
7.	"10 puta nedeljno" (10 Times a Week)	3:25
8.	"Prosečan čovek" (Everyman)	3:25
9.	"Zli sin" (Evil Son)	2:51
10.	"Sve da zaboravim" (To Forget Everything)	4:51
11.	"Zdravo za gotovo" (Taken For Granted)	2:10
12.	"Životinje" (Animals)	2:27
13.	"Teško hodam" (I am Walking Heavily)	3:26

== Personnel ==
Repetitor

- Boris Vlastelica — guitar, vocals
- Ana-Marija Cupin — bass, vocals
- Milena Milutinović — drums

Additional personnel

- Katarina Šoškić — artwork by [design]
- Boris Mladenović — recorded by
- Goran Crevar — recorded by
- Ivo Lorencin — recorded by

== Legacy ==
The lyrics of the songs "Ja" ("I") and "Pukotine" ("Cracks") were featured in Petar Janjatović's book Pesme bratstva, detinjstva & potomstva: Antologija ex YU rok poezije 1967 - 2007 (Songs of Brotherhood, Childhood & Offspring: Anthology of Ex YU Rock Poetry 1967 - 2007), Repetitor being the youngest act whose lyrics are featured in the book.
