= Tai Nguyen =

Vietnamese-Australian actor (born 1975)

- Born: 25 February 1975 (age 51): Saigon, Vietnam; (now Ho Chi Minh City, Vietnam)
- Other name: Tai Tan Nguyen
- Occupation: Actor
- Years active: 1994–present
- Television: Heartbreak High, Sweat
- Height: 175 cm (5 ft 9 in)
- Children: 1

Tai Nguyen (born 25 February 1975) is a Vietnamese-Australian actor. Nguyen began his acting career and best known for his role as Jack Tran Nguyen on the 1994 Australian teen drama series Heartbreak High.

== Early life ==
Nguyen was born in Saigon, Vietnam. His family escaped Vietnam by boat in 1980. After spending time in a Malaysian refugee camp, the family was sponsored by a Dutch Reform Church to settle in Tasmania, Australia where he spent his early childhood. Nguyen has appeared as himself in a documentary by the ABC about the plight of refugees.

== Career ==
Nguyen primarily works in television, having appeared in several productions over the past two decades. His first major acting role was in 1994 on the TV series Heartbreak High alongside Alex Dimitriades, Tony Martin and Sarah Lambert which gained significant press in Australia at the time for its groundbreaking gritty portrayal of multiculturalism in Australian schools. His second role in 1996 was a swimming athlete training for the Olympics on the TV series Sweat alongside Heath Ledger and Martin Henderson.

Nguyen's television work includes Heartbreak High, Sweat and Wildside.

In 2017 he appeared alongside Richard Roxburgh in Blue Murder: Killer Cop, a two-part Australian television miniseries based on true events, produced by Seven Network.

== Filmography ==
Year	Title	Role
1994	Heartbreak High	Jack Tran Nguyen
1996	Sweat	Nhon "Noodle" Huong Tran
1997	Kamikazi	Taxi Driver
1997	Nightride	Nurse
1999	Wildside	Phong Ling
1999	Fresh Air	Tripod
2001	Life Support	Young Man
2002	Young Lions	John
2007	Death's Requiem	Cigarette Seller
2008	Glass	The Cleaner
2013	The Woman On The Top Floor	Man next door
2017	Blue Murder: Killer Cop	Detective Filkins
2021	The Tailings	Marcel
