= Moonlee Records =

- Founded: 2004
- Genre: alternative rock, rock, punk
- Country of origin: Slovenia; Croatia
- Location: Ljubljana, Slovenia
- Official website: www.moonleerecords.com

Moonlee Records is an independent record label established and run since 2004 by music enthusiasts from Ljubljana, Slovenia and Zagreb, Croatia, members of bands Analena and Lunar. Its official headquarters are located in Ljubljana with a branch office in Croatia. The name of the label is a wordplay, deriving from its central mascot, Mr. Moonlee, which is portrayed as a martial artist lemon.

Bands gathered under Moonlee Records are predominantly coming from ex-Yugoslav area – Slovenia, Croatia, Serbia, Bosnia & Herzegovina and North Macedonia. They range from atmospheric instrumental post rock, screamo and high endurance rock. Some of the bands that Moonlee Records promotes are Analena, Bernays Propaganda, Debeli Precjednik / Fat Prezident, Damir Avdić, Repetitor, In-Sane, Xaxaxa, Psycho-Path, Vuneny and Don't Mess With Texas. Once a year the record label organises the promotional Moonleejada Festival with an intense programme by its house bands.

Moonlee Records operates according to DIY principles and Moonlee Records staff gained experience playing in various bands.

It is considered one of the most important and influential independent record labels from this part of Europe.

== Artists ==
- Analena
- Bernays Propaganda
- Bilk
- Chang Ffos
- Cog
- Cripple and Casino
- Damir Avdić
- Debeli precjednik / Fat Prezident
- Don't Mess With Texas
- Etreat
- Hesus Attor
- Hitch
- Iamdisease
- In-Sane
- Kleemar
- Lunar
- Nikki Louder
- Psycho-Path
- Repetitor
- Senata Fox
- Storms
- TRUS!
- Vuneny
- Vlasta Popić
- Xaxaxa

== Releases* ==
RELEASE CODE	ARTIST	TITLE	GENRE	FORMAT	RELEASE DATE
HMRL037	Vlasta Popić	Kvadrat	post punk	LP/CD	28.01.2015
HMRL036	Iamdisease	Praznina	hardcore punk	CD	16.12.2014
HMRL035	Xaxaxa	Sami Maži i Ženi	post punk	CD/LP	08.09.2014
HMRL034	Debeli Precjednik / Fat Prezident	Povijest Bolesti	punk	LP	25.09.2014
HMRL033	Kleemar / Trus!	Banana Split	electronic / post punk	LP	17.12.2013
HMRL032	Nikki Louder	Golden Men	noise rock	CD/LP	17.04.2013
HMRL031	Trus!	First Step	post punk	CD	14.03.2013
HMRL030	Bernays Propaganda	Zabraneta planeta	new wave/post-punk	CD/LP	26.02.2013
HMRL029	Cripple And Casino	With High Regards	post punk	LP	12.02.2013
HMRL028	Repetitor	Dobrodošli na okean	garage rock	CD/LP	29.11.2012
HMRL027	Xaxaxa	Siromašni i Bogati	post punk	LP	08.09.2012
HMRL026	In-Sane / Despite Everything	split	punk	10"	20.04.2012
HMRL025	Debeli Precjednik / Fat Prezident	Bruto Slavo / VBK	punk	CD/LP	08.05.2012
HMRL024	Various Artists	Igraj slobodno!	post punk	free download	10.01.2012
HMRL023	Xaxaxa	Tango Revolucioner	post punk	CD/LP	20.04.2011
HMRL022	Nikki Louder	Our World Died Yesterday	noise rock	LP+CD	03.05.2011
HMRL021	Storms	We Are Storms	post rock	LP	12.09.2011
HMRL020	Bernays Propaganda	My Personal Holiday	post punk	CD/LP	17.05.2010
HMRL019	Damir Avdić	Život je raj	punk blues	CD	05.05.2010
HMRL018	In-Sane	Trust These Hands... Are Worthless	punk	CD	02.12.2009
HMRL017	Analena	Inconstantinopolis	screamo	CD/LP	09.11.2009
HMRL016	Bernays Propaganda	Happiness Machines	post punk	CD/LP	06.04.2009
HMRL015	Hesus Attor	Sonic Gastronomy Vol. 1	mathcore	CD	15.09.2008
HMRL014	Damir Avdić	Mrtvi su mrtvi!	punk blues	CD	24.03.2008
HMRL013	Psycho-Path	The Ass-Soul Of Psycho Path	indie rock	CD	03.03.2008
HMRL012	Don't Mess With Texas	Los Dias De Junio	post rock	CD/LP	08.10.2007
HMRL011	Cog	Course Over Ground	noise rock	CD	07.05.2007
HMRL010	Vuneny	V2	electro	CD	20.11.2006
HMRL009	Debeli Precjednik / Fat Prezident	Through The Eyes Of The Innocent	punk	CD	05.06.2006
HMRL008	Senata Fox	The Acracy Discourse	hardcore punk	CD	05.02.2007
HMRL007	Hitch	We Are Electric!	indie rock	CD/LP	08.05.2006
HMRL006	Chang Ffos	Trust This Arcane Device	metal	CD	08.05.2006
HMRL005	Bilk	This Bilk is Radioactive	drum'n'bass	CD/LP	06.03.2006
HMRL004	Entreat.	Deincubation	metal	CD	27.01.2005
HMRL003	Don't Mess With Texas	Don't Mess With Texas	post rock	CD/LP	15.11.2004
HMRL002	Lunar	Turbo	post rock	CD	29.11.2004
HMRL001	Analena	Carbon Based	screamo	CD/cass/LP	15.11.2004

* all the release are also available for download on Bandcamp
