= Anna-Lena Schwing =

German actress

Anna-Lena Schwing (born 1996 in Bremen) is a German actress.

== Life and professional career ==
Anna-Lena Schwing attended the Waldorf School in the district of Schwachhausen in Bremen, where she was on stage for the first time as the "beast", in The Beauty and the Beast, as part of a school performance of the Theater-AG in 2011.

Schwing attended the New Talent Drama School and has been coached in acting by Patrick Dreikauss since 2012. She has been studying at the Art of Acting Studio in Los Angeles since 2016. In 2013, she played with the Junges.Theater (MoKS) division of Theater Bremen in Wir sind diejenigen, which was developed by the participants themselves.

Also in 2013, Schwing gave her debut in front of the camera. In the episodes "Geocaching" and "In der Tonne" from the TV series Die Pfefferkörner, she played the role of Corinna, a fellow schoolmate of die Pfefferkörner.

== Personal information ==
Anna-Lena Schwing lives in Bremen, plays piano, rides, sails and practices archery.

== Filmography ==
- 2013: Die Pfefferkörner: Geocaching
- 2013: Die Pfefferkörner: In die Tonne
- 2014: In Your Dreams – season one
- 2014: Großstadtrevier: Der gute Bulle
- 2015: Cologne P.D.: Camilla und die tote Nonne
- 2015: Engel der Gerechtigkeit – Geld oder Leben
- 2015: In aller Freundschaft – Die jungen Ärzte: Wahrheiten
- 2015: In Your Dreams – season two
- 2016: Familie Dr. Kleist: Aller Anfang
