= Anna-Lena Lodenius =

Swedish journalist, author and lecturer

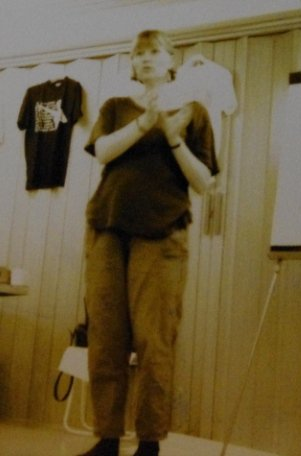
Lodenius in 2012

Elsie Anna-Lena Lodenius (born June 30, 1958 in Norrtälje, Stockholm) is a Swedish journalist, author and lecturer. She is best known for her studies of autonomous extreme nationalist movements and right-wing populism. She has published articles in Expressen, Aftonbladet, Svenska Dagbladet, Dagens Nyheter, Ordfront, Månadsjournalen and Arena.

Lodenius was appointed as a researcher and reporter for investigative television programs such as TV4's Kalla fakta and SVT's Striptease. She also participated in a series of TV and radio programs such as Mosaik and UR's UR-akademin.

From 2003–04 she worked at the Olof Palme International Centre on an information project called "Global Respect". From 2018 she is in the board and the editorial of Doku, a foundation for investigating radical jihadism.

== Bibliography ==
- Operation högervridning (with Sven Ove Hansson), Tiden förlag, 1988
- Extremhögern (with Stieg Larsson), Tidens förlag (revised edition 1994), 1991
- Nazist, rasist eller bara patriot? En bok om den rasistiska ungdomskulturen och främlingsfientligt orienterad brottslighet (with Per Wikström), Rikspolisstyrelsen, 1997
- Vit makt och blågula drömmar: Rasism och nazism i dagens Sverige (with Per Wikström), Natur & Kultur, 1998
- Svenskarna först: Handbok mot rasism och främlingsfientlighet (with Mats Wingborg), Atlas förlag, 1999
- Tvåfrontskrig: Fackets kamp mot nazism och kommunism, Hjalmarsson och Högberg, 2002
- Global Respekt – grundkurs i globalisering och mänskliga rättigheter (2005; English translation, 216; Arabic translation) editor, Premiss förlag, 2004, 2006 and 2013.
- Är det värt det? – om handel och mänskliga rättigheter (editor, Rättvisemärkt och Rena Kläder), 2005 and 2011
- Gatans parlament – om politiska våldsverkare i Sverige (Ordfront, presented in TV4 Morgon August 9, 2006), 2006
- Migrantarbetare – grundkurs om rörlighet, rättigheter och globalisering (with Mats Wingborg), Premiss förlag, 2008
- Slaget om svenskheten – ta debatten med Sverigedemokraterna (with Mats Wingborg), Premiss förlag/Arena Idé, 2009
- Krutdurk Europa (with Mats Wingborg), Bilda förlag, 2011
- Vi säger vad du tänker - högerpopulismen i Europa, Atlas förlag, 2015
- Vi måste förbereda oss på död - i huvudet på en terrorist, Atlas förlag, 2017
- En värmländsk Hitler - Birger Furugård och de första svenska nazisterna, Historiska Media, 2021
- Frigjorda tider - när porren blev kultur och kulturen porr, (with Martin Kristenson and Fredrik af Trampe), Klubb Super 8/Serieslussen, 2022
- Svart på vitt - om Sverigedemokraterna, Atlas förlag, 2022
- Spionjakt i folkhemmet - ett halvsekel med IB-affären, Historiska Media, 2023
