= Toni Kitanovski =

Macedonian jazz guitarist

Toni Kitanovski (born 1964 in Skopje, Yugoslavia (now in present-day North Macedonia)) is a Macedonian jazz guitarist.

== Career ==
Kitanovski started his musical education with Dragan Gjakonovski – Spato in 1979. From 1986–1990 he was the leader of the trio Spato, performing concerts and appearing on radio and television with the trio and as a soloist. He composed and arranged for the MBUC (Music and Ballet School) Chamber Orchestra and the MRT (Macedonian Radio Television) Dance Orchestra. He has recorded as a soloist for WDR in Cologne, Germany.

In the 1990s, he graduated from the Berklee College of Music. He composed for the jazz orchestra of Herb Pomeroy, the Greg Hopkins big band, and led groups of his own. He collaborated with performance artists Bart Uchida and Nancy Adams from Boston and wrote the solo act of Uchida in Taipei, Taiwan. Kitanovski returned to Skopje in 1997 and formed the band Luna. He appeared at the AFES Festival with the FMA Chamber Orchestra as composer and soloist. In 1998, in conjunction with the Skopje Jazz Festival label, he released his debut album, One for Charlie. Three years later he released the live album Duet with the same label.

He released the album Borderlands (Enja, 2006) with the Cherkezi Orchestra.

Kitanovski has worked with Gustavo Aguilar, Steven Bernstein & Sexmob, Matt Darriau, Vinny Golia, Charlie Mariano, and Nat Su.

Along with American punk bassist Mike Watt, Kitanovski guested on the track "Nisto nema da ne' razdeli" for the Bernays Propaganda album Vtora mladost, treta svetska vojna (2nd Youth, 3rd World War)

== Awards ==
- 1988 Robert Share Memorial Award
- 1992–95 Berklee Achievement Scholarship Award, given on three occasions
- 1994 Charles Mingus Award

== Discography ==
- Live at Skopje Jazz Festival with Zoran Madjirov (SJF)
- One for Charlie (SJF, 1998)
- Borderlands with Cherkezi Orchestra (Enja, 2006)

== See also ==
- Music of the Republic of Macedonia
