= Anna-Lena Laurin =

Swedish composer and pianist

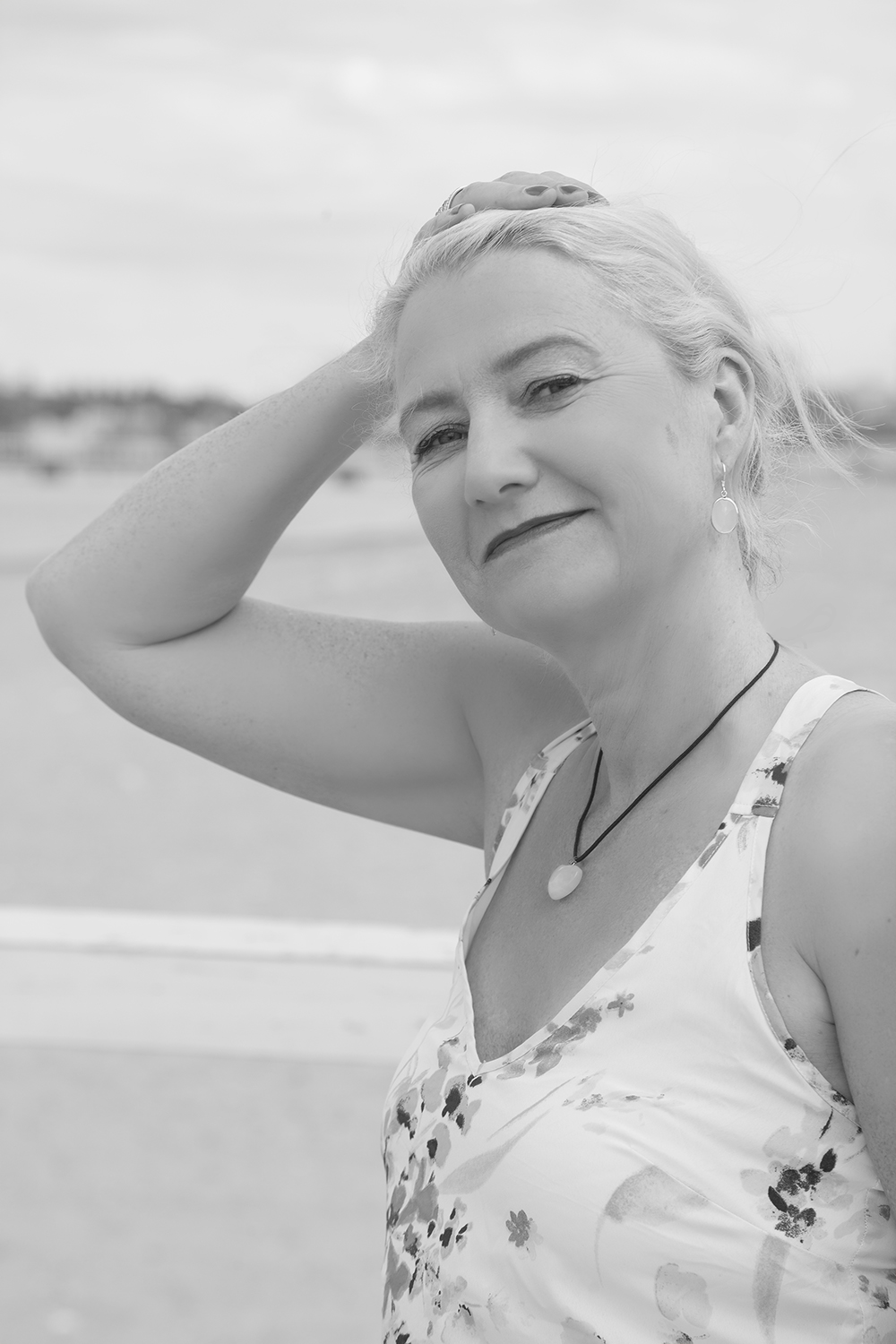
Anna-Lena Laurin

Anna-Lena Laurin (born 1962) is a classical Swedish composer and pianist whose music often involves jazz improvisation in her orchestral works. She was commissioned to write Iphigenia (2009) for the Royal Stockholm Philharmonic Orchestra and was named Jazz Composer of the Year by Swedish Radio in 2013. She frequently writes music in which her partner, the trumpet soloist Anders Bergcrantz, is able to perform.

== Biography ==
Born in Halmstad on 31 October 1962, Laurin began her career as a jazz pianist and singer. As a classical composer, she has worked with orchestras including the Royal Stockholm Philharmonic Orchestra and NorrlandsOperan's Symphony Orchestra. Commissioned by Camerata Nordica and Musik i Syd for the 100th anniversary of the city of Eslöv, her Concerto for flute, strings and harp (2009) was nominated one of Sweden's most successful compositions of 2011. In 2013, Swedish Radio offered her the Jazz Composer of the Year Award "for her ability to create a successful crossover between the jazz’s and classical music’s language and the courage to write music from her heart without looking at prevailing musical trends".
