= The Devilrock Four =

Australian rock band

- Origin: Melbourne, Victoria, Australia
- Genres: Hard rock, pub rock
- Years active: 2003–present
- Labels: Shrunken Head/Shock, Zatzit, High Kick Records,
- Members: Jamie Coghill; Jonny Driver; Jimi Richardson; Carl Treasure
- Website: thedevilrockfour.com

The Devilrock Four are an Australian rock band formed in 2003. The quartet's founding mainstays are Jamie Coghill on drums, percussion and backing vocals; Jonny Driver on guitar and lead vocals; Jimi Richardson on bass guitar and backing vocals; and Carl Treasure on guitar and vocals. They have issued two studio albums, First in Line (February 2007) and Night Is Falling (May 2013). The group first toured Europe in mid-2008.

== History ==
The Devilrock Four formed in 2003 in Melbourne as a hard rock group with the line-up of Jamie Coghill on drums, percussion and backing vocals (The Jimmy C, ex-Just, Luxedo, Fez Perez), Jonny Driver on guitar and lead vocals (Uptown Ace, Jonny Driver, Despairs, Don Fernando, ex-The Lightning Strikes, High Kick Crazy), Jimi Richardson on bass guitar and backing vocals (Uptown Ace, Indian Mynah, ex-Clutch Life, the Rubs, Rapdance Cool Party) and Carl Treasure on guitar and vocals (Indian Mynah, The Bad Dad Orchestra, Blackstone Dukes, ex-Drone, the Rubs). They played the local pub circuit.

In February 2004 released their first extended play, which was self-titled and had six tracks – two were written by Driver and four by Treasure. They were voted most outstanding band at the Duke of Windsor Hotel and band of the year at The Green Room. The band signed to the Premier Artists talent agency and Shrunken Head Records, while Shock Records distributed their second EP, Livin' This Low, in March 2005. All five tracks were written by Treasure and they were recorded at Birdland studios, Melbourne. The title track was issued as a single and its music video was shown on rage in April 2005.

The group signed to Zatzit Records in 2006 and, during May to June, recorded their debut full-length album, at Sing Sing Studios, Melbourne. First in Line was co-produced by the band with engineer–producer, Matt Voigt. Six tracks were written by Driver and five by Treasure; it was issued in February 2007. In 2008 the album's first single, "Don't Throw It Away" (October 2006), was used in advertising for Channel 10's coverage of the Australian Football League. Other TV spots include Channel 9's Canal Road, Channel 10's Big Brother and Guerrilla Gardeners.

In mid-2008 the Devilrock Four toured Europe for the first time. Playing 15 shows throughout the United Kingdom and Spain. After the tour, they signed to German label Unconform Records and Indevent Management. In 2009 the quartet re-issued First in Line for the German market. In December that year they supported Lime Spiders at a Melbourne gig. Jules McKenzie of fellow rock group, Money for Rope, told Tony McMahon of theMusic.com.au that the local "underground music scene has that inherent value in it... Let's say a band like The Devilrock Four or something like that. They have this kind of Melbourne rock band sound."

In February 2013 an ensemble of Coghil, Driver, Richardson and Treasure were joined by guest vocalists, the Wolfgramm Sisters, to honour AC/DC's lead vocalist, Bon Scott, in Yarraville. The Devilrock Four's second studio album, Night is Falling, was released in May that year on High Kick Records.

== Discography ==
=== Albums ===
- First in Line (February 2007)
- Night Is Falling (May 2013)

=== Extended plays ===
- The Devilrock Four (February 2004)
- Livin' This Low (March 2005)

=== Singles ===
- "Livin' This Low" (March 2005)
- "Don't Throw It Away" (October 2006)
- "No Friend of Mine" (2007)
- "Last Night" (2010)
- "Wrecking Ball" (2013)
