= Analena =

Croatian-Slovenian post-hardcore band (former 1997)

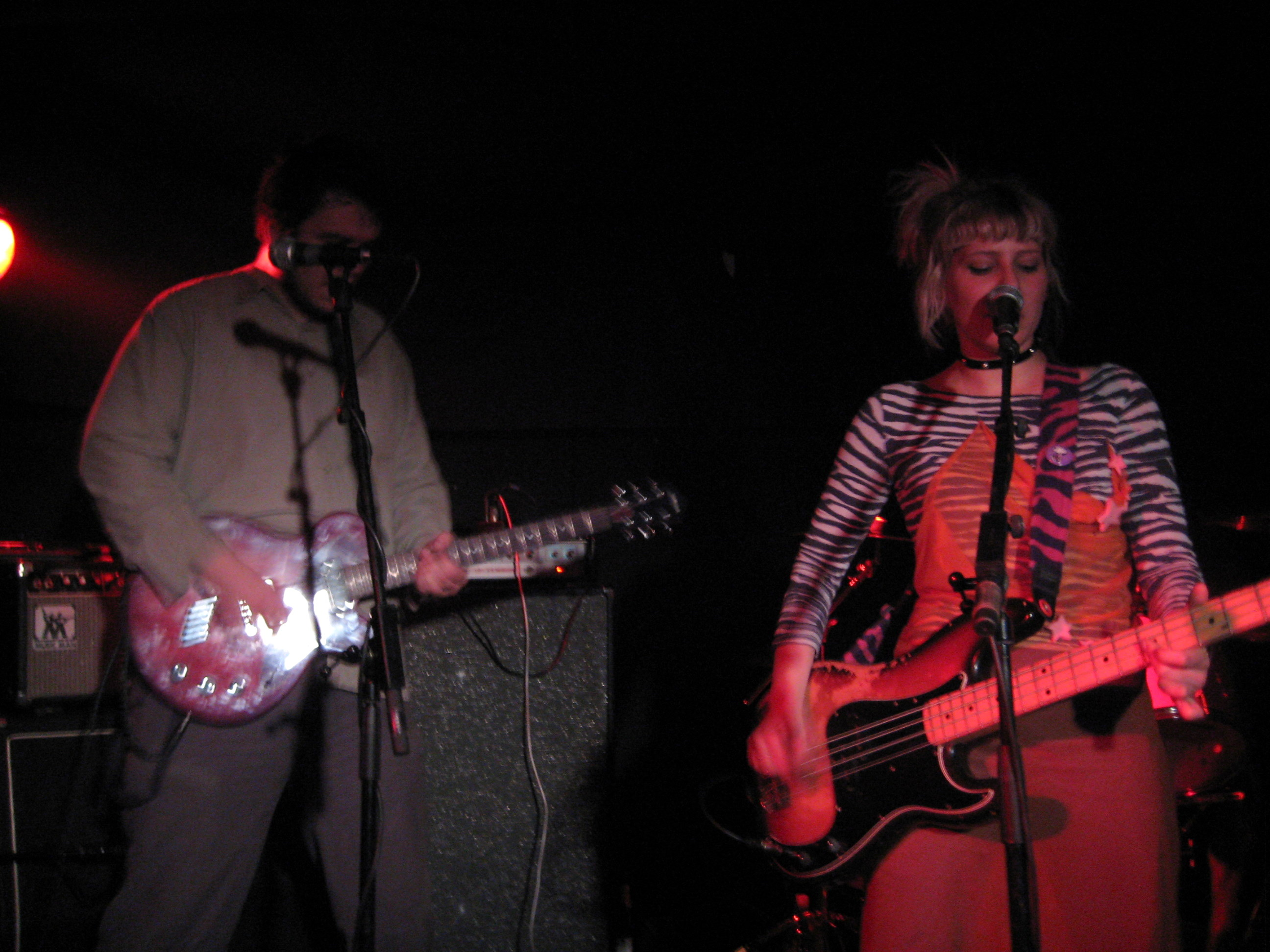
- Analena at Interstellar Festival 2008.

Background information
- Origin: Croatia, Slovenia
- Genres: Noise rock, post-hardcore, post-punk, screamo, hardcore punk
- Years active: 1997–present
- Labels: Moonlee, Get Off, Interstellar, LibberTea
- Members: Ana Franjić; Miodrag Gladović "Mijo"; Miran Rusjan; Dubravko Dragojević "Zet"
- Past members: Danijel Sikora "Six"

Analena is a Croatian-Slovenian post-hardcore band, founded in 1997 in Zagreb, Croatia. The name of the band comes from the ancient Sanskrit language, meaning "like/by the fire".

== History ==
The band was founded in 1997 by Danijel Sikora – Six, Miodrag Gladović – Mijo, and Dubravko Dragojević – Zet, from Zagreb, Croatia. One year later Ana Franjić, also from Zagreb, joined them as leading vocalist. The fifth member, Miran Rusan from Slovenia joined in 2003. This lineup remained active until 2006 when Danijel Sikora left the band. They performed first with a substitute bassist and later with Ana Franjić not only as a vocalist, but as a bassist too. They have been a four-piece ever since.

They released their first album in 2000, followed by a couple of split albums. Since they didn't have a label and as supporters of independent publishing and DIY ethics, members formed their record label Moonlee Records, under which they released their next two albums in 2004 and 2009.

Besides Croatia and Slovenia, they played all over Europe and participated in several festivals, including one of the largest independent hardcore festivals in Europe, Fluff Fest in the Czech Republic.

== Discography ==
- 14.07.99. (demo, 1999)
- Arhythmetics (Get Off Records, 2000)
- Analena // Unison (split album, Get Off Records, LibberTea Records, 2001)
- It's Never Too Late To Split Up (split album with Sensual Love, Interstellar Records, Get Off Records, 2002)
- Carbon Based (Moonlee Records, 2004)
- Inconstantinopolis (Moonlee Records, 2009)
