= Treehouse (Sofi Tukker album) =

Studio album by Sofi Tukker
- Released: April 13, 2018
- Genre: House
- Length: 31:44
- Language: English; Portuguese
- Label: Ultra
- Producer: Sofi Tukker

Sofi Tukker chronology
Soft Animals (2016)	Treehouse (2018)	Dancing on the People (2019)

Singles from Treehouse
- 1. "Johny" Released: January 18, 2017; 2. "Fuck They" Released: July 7, 2017; 3. "Best Friend" Released: September 12, 2017; 4. "Energia" Released: November 17, 2017; 5. "Baby I'm a Queen" Released: March 9, 2018; 6. "Batshit" Released: April 6, 2018; 7. "Benadryl" Released: December 31, 2018

Professional ratings
Review scores
Source	Rating
DIY	4/5 stars
Slant Magazine	3.5/5 stars

Treehouse is the debut studio album by American electronic dance music DJ duo Sofi Tukker. It was released on April 13, 2018, through Ultra Records. The album spawned seven singles, including "Best Friend", which features Nervo, the Knocks and Alisa Ueno and became Sofi Tukker's first entry on the US Billboard Hot 100 chart, reaching number 81. The song also figured in the top 20 of pop, alternative, and dance US charts. The album's second track, "Energia", received a remix, subtitled "Parte 2", with additional vocals by Brazilian singer Pabllo Vittar and additional writing by Arthur Marques, Pablo Bispo and Rodrigo Gorky. The fourth track, "Batshit", was used in the ninth episode of the second season of Marvel Television series Runaways, whilst a remix of "Good Time Girl" featuring Charlie Barker was used as the opening theme for the first six episodes of HBO series The New Pope. At the 61st ceremony of the Grammy Awards, Treehouse was nominated for Best Dance/Electronic Album.

== Track listing ==
Treehouse track listing
No.	Title	Writer(s)	Producer(s)	Length
1.	"Fuck They"	Sophie Hawley-Weld; Tucker Halpern; Jon Hume	Sofi Tukker; Hume^{[c]}; Ricky Reed^{[a]}	3:04
2.	"Energia"	Hawley-Weld; Halpern	Sofi Tukker	3:07
3.	"Benadryl"	Hawley-Weld; Halpern; Hume; Charlie Barker	Sofi Tukker; Hume^{[c]}; Mark Ralph^{[a]}	3:16
4.	"Batshit"	Hawley-Weld; Halpern; Hume; Fred Fairbrass; Richard Fairbrass; Rob Manzoli	Sofi Tukker; Hume^{[c]}	3:23
5.	"Good Time Girl" (featuring Charlie Barker)	Hawley-Weld; Halpern	Sofi Tukker	3:04
6.	"Johny"	Hawley-Weld; Halpern	Sofi Tukker	3:04
7.	"My Body Hurts"	Hawley-Weld; Halpern	Sofi Tukker	3:03
8.	"The Dare"	Hawley-Weld; Halpern; Rafael Cohen	Sofi Tukker	3:11
9.	"Baby I'm a Queen"	Hawley-Weld; Halpern; James Patterson	Sofi Tukker	3:28
10.	"Best Friend" (featuring Nervo, the Knocks, and Alisa Ueno)	Hawley-Weld; Halpern; Miriam Nervo; Olivia Nervo; Patterson; Hiromi Kawanabe; Alisa Ueno	Sofi Tukker	3:04
Total length:				31:44

Japanese edition
No.	Title	Writer(s)	Producer(s)	Length
1.	"Best Friend" (featuring Nervo, the Knocks, and Alisa Ueno)	Hawley-Weld; Halpern; M. Nervo; O. Nervo; Patterson; Kawanabe; Ueno	Sofi Tukker	3:04
2.	"Fuck They"	Hawley-Weld; Halpern; Hume	Sofi Tukker; Hume^{[c]}; Reed^{[a]}	3:04
3.	"Energia"	Hawley-Weld; Halpern	Sofi Tukker	3:07
4.	"Benadryl"	Hawley-Weld; Halpern; Hume; Barker	Sofi Tukker; Hume^{[c]}; Ralph^{[a]}	3:16
5.	"Batshit"	Hawley-Weld; Halpern; Hume; F. Fairbrass; R. Fairbrass; Manzoli	Sofi Tukker; Hume^{[c]}	3:23
6.	"Good Time Girl" (featuring Charlie Barker)	Hawley-Weld; Halpern	Sofi Tukker	3:04
7.	"Johny"	Hawley-Weld; Halpern	Sofi Tukker	3:04
8.	"My Body Hurts"	Hawley-Weld; Halpern	Sofi Tukker	3:03
9.	"The Dare"	Hawley-Weld; Halpern; Rafael Cohen	Sofi Tukker	3:11
10.	"Baby I'm a Queen"	Hawley-Weld; Halpern; James Patterson	Sofi Tukker	3:28
Total length:				31:44

Japanese edition bonus tracks
No.	Title	Writer(s)	Producer(s)	Length
11.	"Drinkee"	Hawley-Weld; Halpern; Ricardo de Carvalho Duarte	Sofi Tukker	4:59
12.	"Awoo" (featuring Betta Lemme)	Hawley-Weld; Halpern	Sofi Tukker	3:16
13.	"Best Friend (featuring Nervo, the Knocks, and Alisa Ueno)" (Oliver Heldens remix)	Hawley-Weld; Halpern; M. Nervo; O. Nervo; Patterson; Kawanabe; Ueno	Sofi Tukker	3:25
Total length:				43:31

Notes

- ^{^[c]} signifies a co-producer.
- ^{^[a]} signifies an additional producer.
- "Batshit" contains an interpolation of "I'm Too Sexy", written and composed by Richard Fairbrass, Fred Fairbrass, and Rob Manzoli.
- "Energia" contains words from the poem entitled "Jeep Lunar" written by Chacal.
- "Benadryl" contains words from the poem "Apaixonada" by Ana Cristina Cesar.
- "Johnny" contains words from the poem entitled "Johny? Está Me Ouvindo?" written by Paulo Leminski.
- "The Dare" contains words from the poem entitled "Entre", written by Chacal.

== Personnel ==
Sofi Tukker

- Tucker Halpern – vocals
- Sophie Hawley-Weld – vocals

Additional musicians

- Jon Hume – keyboards (tracks 1, 3, 4), additional guitar (4, 10)
- Mary Duncan Craig – charango (track 2)
- Charlie Barker – vocals (track 5)
- Rafael Cohen – guitar (track 8)
- Nervo – vocals (track 10)
- Alisa Ueno – vocals (track 10)
- The Knocks – vocals (track 10)

Technical

- Joe Lambert – mastering
- Jon Hume – mixing (tracks 1, 3, 4)
- Bryan Wilson – mixing (tracks 2, 5–10)
- Mark Ralph – mixing (track 3)

== Charts ==
Chart (2018)	Peak position
Belgian Albums (Ultratop Flanders)	66
Belgian Albums (Ultratop Wallonia)	165
Canadian Albums (Billboard)	54
Dutch Albums (Album Top 100)	126
Japanese Albums (Oricon)	87
New Zealand Heatseeker Albums (RMNZ)	9
US Heatseekers Albums (Billboard)	6
US Independent Albums (Billboard)	14
US Top Dance Albums (Billboard)	5
