= List of artists who reached number one on the U.S. dance airplay chart =

This is a list of recording artists who have reached number one on Billboard magazine's Dance/Mix Show Airplay chart. Originally at the start, Billboard began ranking dance music based on radio airplay the week ending August 17, 2003, based on data from Nielsen Broadcast Data Systems, but it was modified in November 2011 to include Mainstream Top 40 and Rhythmic Top 40 stations that feature club mix shows in their programming.

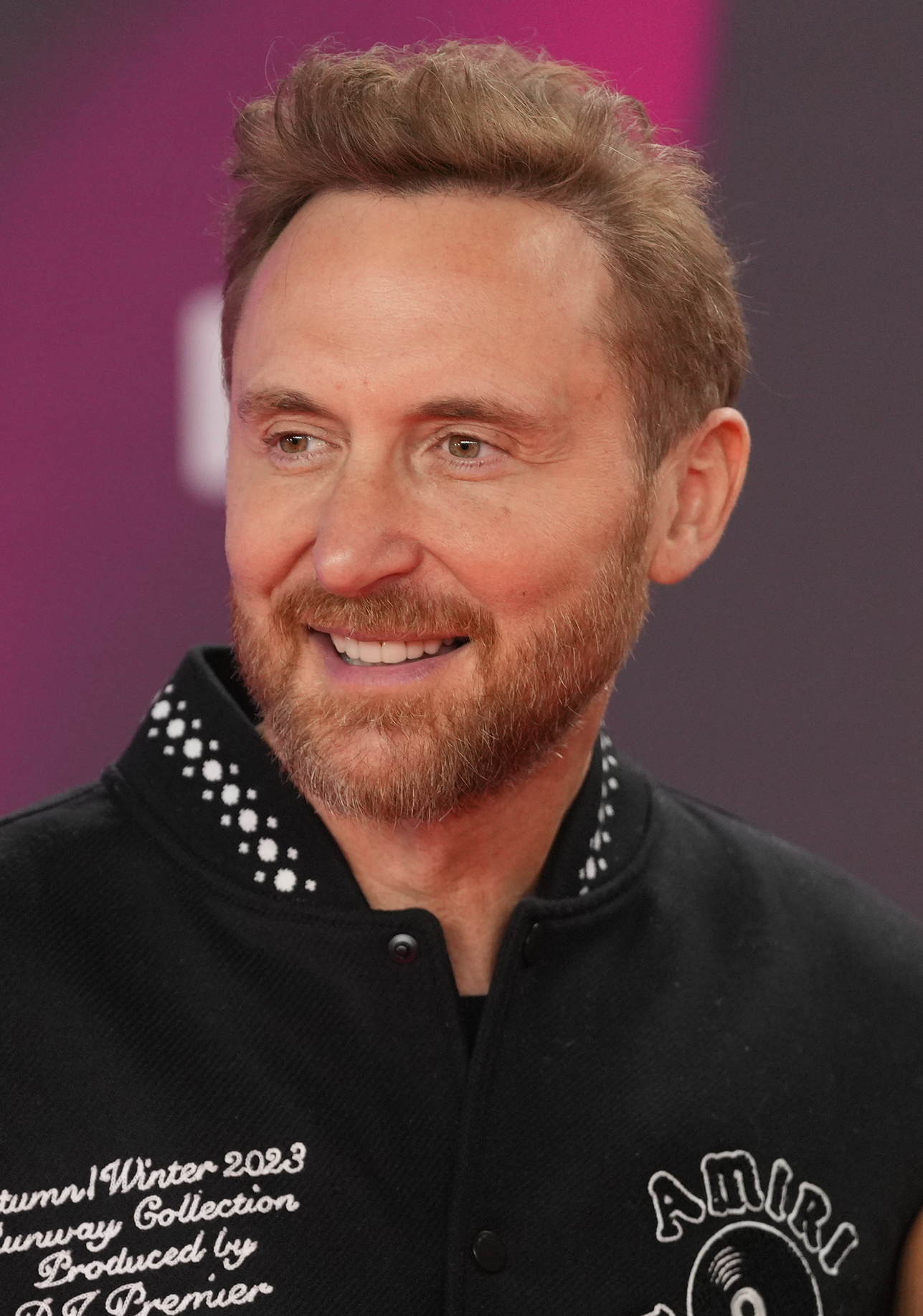
With a total of 21 songs, David Guetta hold the record for the most number ones.

- All acts are listed alphabetically.
- Solo artists are alphabetized by last name, groups by group name excluding "a," "an" and "the."
- Each act's total of number-one U.S. dance airplay hits is shown after their name.
- All artists who are mentioned in song credits are listed here; this includes one-time pairings of otherwise solo artists and those appearing as "featured".
- Many dance artists and producers use aliases and pseudonyms - this list shows whichever artist name was used on the record.
- Members of groups who reached number one are not listed here separately from their groups, unless they also hit number one as a solo artist.

== A ==
- Adele (1)
- Avicii (3)
- Afrojack (1)
- Christina Aguilera (1)
- Akon (1)
- Aldae (1)
- Alesso (3)
- Alnja (1)
- Alok (1)
- AlunaGeorge (2)
- Alphaville (1)
- Aluna (1)
- Imael Angel (1)
- Angel City (1)
- ANML KNGDM (1)
- AnnaGrace (3)
- Anne-Marie (3)
- Anyma (1)
- Kaitlin Aragon (1)
- Tina Arena (1)
- Florence Arman (1)
- Arty (1)
- Audien (1)
- Aviella (1)
- Iggy Azalea (1)

== B ==
- Cardi B (1)
- Katy B (1)
- Bad Bunny (1)
- J Balvin (1)
- Basshunter (1)
- Bastille (1)
- Natasha Bedingfield (2)
- Bellatrax (1)
- Benny Benassi (3)
- Em Beihold (1)
- Lauren Bennett (1)
- Spragga Benz (1)
- Madison Beer (3)
- Beyoncé (5)
- Justin Bieber (5)
- Aloe Blacc (2)
- The Blessed Madonna (1)
- Mary J. Blige (1)
- Daniel Blume (1)
- Blond:Ish (1)
- Vera Blue (1)
- Bright Sparks (1)
- BT (1)
- Bonnie X Clyde (1)
- Bunt (2)

== C ==
- Henry Camamile (1)
- Camila Cabello (1)
- Captain Cuts (1)
- Alessia Cara (2)
- Mariah Carey (3)
- James Carter (1)
- Cascada (3)
- Catello (1)
- Joel Corry (3)
- The Chainsmokers (11)
- Cheat Codes (1)
- Chvrches (1)
- Ciara (1)
- Kelly Clarkson (1)
- Clean Bandit (2)
- Cloonee (1)
- Shane Codd (1)
- Coldplay (1)
- Ida Corr (1)
- Deborah Cox (1)

== D ==
- D.O.D. (1)
- Dabin (1)
- Daddy Yankee (1)
- Daft Punk (1)
- Daniela (1)
- J.D. Davis (1)
- Dawty (1)
- Daya (2)
- DCUP (1)
- Deadmau5 (3)
- Lana Del Rey (1)
- Lily Denning (1)
- Deorro (1)
- Jason Derulo (1)
- Destiny's Child (1)
- DHT (1)
- Diplo (2)
- Dirty Vegas (1)
- Disciples (1)
- Disco Lines (2)
- DJ Mental Theo's Bazzheads (1)
- DJ Mog (1)
- DJ Snake (2)
- DLMT (1)
- Doja Cat (1)
- Dom Dolla (3)
- Kenny Dope (1)
- Clementine Douglas (2)
- Dragonette (1)
- Hilary Duff (3)
- DyCy (1)
- DubVision (1)
- Ellee Duke (1)
- Dzeko (1)
- DVBBS (1)

== E ==
- Missy Elliott (1)
- Brandi Emma (1)
- Anabel Englund (7)
- Enisa (1)
- Enur (1)
- Ercola (1)
- Ella Eyre (1)

== F ==
- Faithless (1)
- Fergie (1)
- Filo & Peri (1)
- Fisher (2)
- Flanders (1)
- Abi Flynn (1)
- Sonny Fodera (1)
- Luis Fonsi (1)
- Foster the People (1)
- Dillon Francis (1)
- Nelly Furtado (1)

== G ==
- Lady Gaga (4)
- Galantis (2)
- Martin Garrix (3)
- Alex Gaudino (2)
- Gary Go (1)
- Cedric Gervais (2)
- Get Far (1)
- Georgia Ku (1)
- Hayley Gibby (1)
- GIELLE (1)
- Layton Giordani (1)
- Glockenbach (1)
- Jess Glynne (1)
- Selena Gomez & the Scene (1)
- Goodboys (1)
- GoonRock (1)
- Gotye (1)
- Peggy Gou (1)
- Ellie Goulding (9)
- Brieanna Grace (1)
- Kenya Grace (1)
- Ariana Grande (3)
- Tom Grennan (1)
- Grey (1)
- Gryffin (2)
- GT Ofice (1)
- David Guetta (22)
- Guru Josh Project (1)

== H ==
- H-Boogie (1)
- Charlotte Haining (1)
- Halsey (3)
- Sam Harper (1)
- Calvin Harris (19)
- Preston Harris (1)
- Bobby Harvey (1)
- Haven (1)
- Hayla (3)
- Oliver Heldens (1)
- Ella Henderson (1)
- Emma Hewitt (1)
- Becky Hill (2)
- Keri Hilson (1)
- Hozier (1)
- Hugel (2)
- Hvme (1)
- Chrissie Hynde (1)
- James Hype (3)

== I ==
- Icona Pop (1)
- Illenium (8)
- Inez (1)
- Ink (1)
- Inna (1)

== J ==
- Felix Jaehn (1)
- Natalie Jane (1)
- Jonas Brothers (1)
- Jax Jones (2)
- Erika Jayne (1)
- Jay-Z (2)
- Jazzy (2)
- Jeremih (1)
- Jex (2)
- Haley Joelle (1)
- John Newman (1)
- Jes (1)
- Vika Jigulina (1)
- Jain (1)
- Elton John (2)
- Alexis Jordan (1)

== K ==
- Kamille (1)
- Kaskade (7)
- Kiesza (1)
- Krewella (2)
- Kesha (1)
- Khalid (1)
- The Killers (1)
- Kimbra (1)
- The Knocks (1)
- Kx5 (1)

== L ==
- Nick Lachey (1)
- Laidback Luke (1)
- Chris Lake (1)
- Zara Larsson (3)
- Lasgo (1)
- Lauv (1)
- Fedde le Grand (1)
- Coi Leray (1)
- Blake Lewis (1)
- Leona Lewis (1)
- Lights (1)
- Lilly Wood (& the Prick) (1)
- LMFAO (2)
- Little Mix (1)
- Dua Lipa (6)
- Lizzo (3)
- Lodato (3)
- Jennifer Lopez (2)
- Lea-Lorien (1)
- Loud Luxury (3)
- Ludacris (1)
- Eric Luminere (1)
- Liam Payne (1)
- Kareen Lomax (2)
- Peter Luts & Dominica (1)
- Sarah Lynn (1)
- Kevin Lyttle (1)

== M ==
- Madelline (1)
- Madonna (10)
- Mahalo (1)
- Major Lazer (3)
- Major League DJz (1)
- Post Malone (1)
- Malou (1)
- Maroon 5 (1)
- Ayah Marar (1)
- Bruno Mars (1)
- Marshmello (4)
- Matisse (1)
- Sophia May (1)
- Edward Maya (1)
- Marc E. Bassy (1)
- MØ (1)
- M'black (1)
- Lara McAllen (1)
- Angela McCluskey (1)
- Tate McRae (2)
- Medina (1)
- oskar med k (2)
- Meduza (5)
- Mike Posner (2)
- MK (1)
- Madison Love (1)
- John Martin (2)
- George Michael (1)
- Miguel (1)
- Kylie Minogue (3)
- Mark Ronson (1)
- Miley Cyrus (1)
- Milky (1)
- Nicki Minaj (2)
- MNEK (1)
- David Morales (1)
- Maren Morris (1)
- Motorcycle (1)
- Morgan Page (1)
- Mr. Probz (2)
- Matthew Koma (1)
- Marcus Mumford (1)
- Ava Max (2)

== N ==
- Lil Nas X (1)
- Natasja (1)
- Ultra Naté (1)
- Nervo (1)
- Nina Nesbitt (1)
- Ne-Yo (2)
- Never Dull (1)
- Nico & Vinz (1)
- Nina Sky (1)
- North (1)
- NOTD (2)
- Tina Novak (1)
- Nyla (1)

== O ==
- Oaks (3)
- Fuse ODG (1)
- Odd Mob (1)
- Kelly Osbourne (1)
- OutKast (1)

== P ==
- Mau P (3)
- Panic! At the Disco (1)
- Dolly Parton (1)
- Sean Paul (2)
- Katy Perry (5)
- Jonathan Peters (1)
- Kim Petras (2)
- P!nk (4)
- Pink Floyd (1)
- Pitbull (1)
- Plumb (2)
- Portugal. The Man (1)
- Lucas Prata (1)
- Preme (1)
- Prospa (1)
- Eric Prydz (1)
- Pussycat Dolls (1)
- Charlie Puth (1)

== Q ==
- Quavo (1)

== R ==
- RANI (1)
- Bebe Rexha (1)
- Jessie Reyez (1)
- Flo Rida (1)
- Rita Ora (2)
- Ralphi (1)
- Rihanna (12)
- Billy Ray Cyrus (1)
- Raye (2)
- Regard (1)
- Bebe Rexha (5)
- Busta Rhymes (1)
- Riton (1)
- Emily Roberts (1)
- Roc Project (2)
- Kelly Rowland (2)
- Eliza Rose (1)
- ROZES (1)
- Rüfüs Du Sol (1)

== S ==
- Sacha (1)
- Will Sass (2)
- Saweetie (1)
- Robin Schulz (1)
- Travis Scott (1)
- Seal (1)
- Big Sean (1)
- September (1)
- SG Lewis (1)
- Shouse (1)
- Shape: UK (1)
- Ed Sheeran (3)
- Sylver Logan Sharp (1)
- Ned Shepard (1)
- Shift K3Y (1)
- Sia (1)
- Sidepiece (1)
- Sigrid (1)
- Silk City (1)
- Eva Simons (1)
- Troye Sivan (1)
- Fatboy Slim (1)
- Jorja Smith (1)
- Sam Smith (3)
- Sneaky Sound System (1)
- Snoop Dogg (1)
- Sofi Tukker (1)
- Martin Solveig (2)
- Kim Sozzi (3)
- Alana Springsteen (1)
- Britney Spears (5)
- Alexandra Stan (1)
- Riva Starr (1)
- Lennon Stella (1)
- Stellar Project (1)
- Alexander Stewart (1)
- Harry Styles (2)
- Sub Focus (1)
- Sultan (1)
- Swedish House Mafia (4)
- Shift K3Y (1)
- Taylor Swift (1)
- Teddy Swims (1)
- Rob Swire (1)

== T ==
- Tchami (1)
- Taio Cruz (2)
- TELYKAST (1)
- The Temper Trap (1)
- Young Thug (1)
- T.I. (1)
- Tiësto (8)
- Justin Timberlake (4)
- Timbaland (2)
- Tinashe (1)
- Sam Tompkins (1)
- Tones and I (2)
- Tove Lo (3)
- Tube & Berger (1)
- Two Friends (2)
- Tyla (1)

== U ==
- Alisa Ueno (1)
- Usher (2)

== V ==
- Armin Van Buuren (3)
- Despina Vandi (1)
- Vula (1)

== W ==
- Frank Walker (1)
- The Wanted (1)
- Emily Warren (1)
- The Weeknd (1)
- Florence Welch (1)
- Kurtis Wells (1)
- Kanye West (1)
- Hayley Williams (1)
- Michelle Williams (1)
- Pharrell Williams (1)
- Chris Willis (2)
- J. Worra (1)

== X ==
- Charli XCX (4)

== Y ==
- Yolanda Be Cool (1)

== Z ==
- Kaleena Zanders (1)
- Zedd (5)
- Zerb (1)

== See also ==
- List of artists who reached number one on the U.S. Dance Club Songs chart
- List of artists who reached number one on the Hot Dance/Electronic Songs
