= Vintage Culture =

Brazilian DJ and music producer (born 1993)

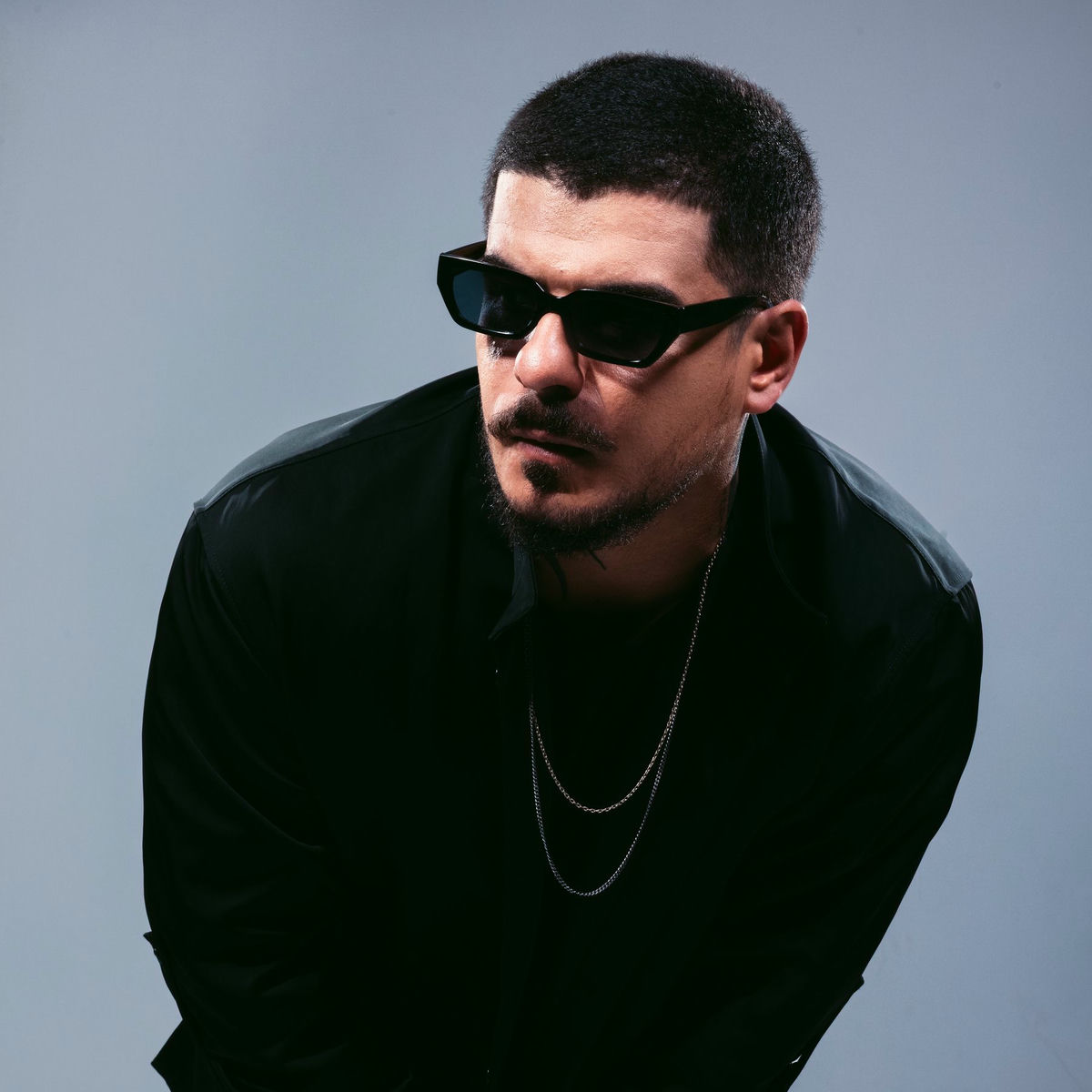
- Vintage Culture in 2026
- Born: Lukas Rafael Ruiz Hespanhol; 7 July 1993 (age 33); Mundo Novo, Mato Grosso do Sul, Brazil
- Occupations: Record producer, DJ, manager
- Years active: 2011–present
- Musical career
- Genres: House; dance
- Instrument: Digital audio workstation
- Labels: Spinnin' Records; Só Track Boa
- Website: vintageculture.com

Lukas Rafael Ruiz Hespanhol (Brazilian Portuguese: [ˈlukɐz ʁafaˈɛw ʁuˈiz espɐ̃ˈɲɔw]; born 7 July 1993), better known by his stage name Vintage Culture, is a Brazilian DJ and record producer. Popular remixes of his include "Blue Monday" by New Order and "Another Brick in the Wall" by Pink Floyd, and his versions of "Bete Balanço" by Cazuza and "Bidolibido" by Fernanda Abreu.

Vintage Culture is also a record company manager at Só Track Boa.

== Biography ==
Lukas Ruiz Hespanhol was born in Mundo Novo, Mato Grosso do Sul on 7 July 1993. Son of Valdir and Edmara Rita Hespanhol, he has a sister named Lohana Sthefanie Hespanhol Ruiz. During his childhood, he spent much of it in a farming village in Katueté, a city in Paraguay in the Canindeyú Department, which borders Brazil. At the time, he helped his father with work on the family farm and his desire was to be a "harvest pilot". At the age of eight, he moved to Mundo Novo, where he studied at the Mundo Novo Mickey Educational Center where he completed elementary school and graduated from high school.

It was in that city that his interest in electronic music began when he found a CD that his uncle had. Since then, he had been enjoying electronic new wave bands like New Order and Depeche Mode.

After finishing school he moved to Maringá at the age of 19, where he decided to study law, but he abandoned this to dedicate himself fully to producing music.

In 2015, Vintage Culture missed the DJ Mag Top 100 DJs list by appearing at No. 118. In the same year, he appeared at No. 2 in the House Mag Best Brazilian DJs list. By 2016, he achieved the 54th position in the DJ Mag list.

In 2016, he released the EP Hollywood by Ganza Seal Skol Music in partnership with Spinnin' Records. Soon after, his remix of "Drinkee" by the duo Sofi Tukker was released by Ultra Music and reached No. 4 on the Beatport dance chart; after a month, the release had remained in the top 10. The song "Wild Kidz" gained international recognition, entering Spotify's Global Viral list and receiving support from Oliver Heldens, EDX, and Sam Feldt.

In 2023, he reached the best position of his career, at No. 10 in the DJ Mag Top DJs list.

== Discography ==
=== Extended plays ===
- Hollywood (2016), Ganzá

=== Singles ===
Title	Year	Peak chart positions				Certifications	Album
Title	Year	LAT Air.	TUR Int. Air.	US Dance	US Dance Club	Certifications	Album
"What U Want"	2013	*	–	–	–		Non-album single
"Disco Nights"	2013	*	–	–	–		Disco Nights - EP
"U Gonna Want Me"	2013	*	–	–	–		Non-album singles
"70's Police Pursuits"	2013	*	–	–	–		Non-album singles
"Everyday" (featuring theDuo)	2014	*	–	–	–		Everyday's a G-Thing
"Body Down"	2014	*	–	–	–		Body Down - EP
"Real" (with Elephanto featuring Ju Nedel)	2014	*	–	–	–		Side B
"Love Games"	2014	*	–	–	–		Love Games EP
"Hey No" (with Nytron)	2014	*	–	–	–		Hey No EP
"Cicles" (with Ashibah)	2014	*	–	–	–		Non-album singles
"I Like Dirty"	2014	*	–	–	–		Non-album singles
"Sure Thing" (with Eastrip & Torha featuring Ashibah)	2014	*	–	–	–		Non-album singles
"Love Haters" (with Re Dupre)	2015	*	–	–	–		Non-album singles
"Voices" (with Eastrip & Torha featuring Ellie Ka)	2015	*	–	–	–		Non-album singles
"Eyes" (with Constantinne and Felten)	2015	*	–	–	–		Non-album singles
"Sometimes" (with Woo2Tech)	2015	*	–	–	–		Non-album singles
"Slowing Down"	2015	*	–	–	–		Non-album singles
"Hollywood"	2016	–	–	–	–		Non-album singles
"Wild Kidz" (with RICCI)	2016	–	–	–	–		Non-album singles
"Manifesto" (with Wolfire featuring Anamari)	2017	–	–	–	–		Non-album singles
"Why Don't U Love" (with Selva and Lazy Bear)	2017	–	–	–	–		Non-album singles
"Later" (with RICCI)	2017	–	–	–	–		Non-album singles
"Monday" (with Felguk and Le Dib)	2017	–	–	–	–		Non-album singles
"Feeling Good" (with Chemical Surf)	2017	–	–	–	–		Non-album singles
"Memories" (with Clubbers)	2017	–	–	–	–	Pro-Música: Platinum	Non-album singles
"Eternity" (with Jetlag Music)	2018	–	–	–	–		Non-album singles
"Cante por Nós" (with KVSH featuring Breno Miranda)	2018	–	–	–	–		Non-album singles
"Need U" (with Krieger(BR))	2018	–	–	–	–		Non-album singles
"Pour Over" (with Adam K)	2018	–	–	–	16	Pro-Música: 2× Diamond	Non-album singles
"I Will Find" (with Rooftime)	2018	–	–	–	–	Pro-Música: 2× Diamond	Non-album singles
"Save Me" (with Adam K featuring MKLA)	2018	–	–	–	–	Pro-Música: Diamond	Non-album singles
"Yesterday" (with Pimpo Gama)	2019	–	–	–	–	Pro-Música: 2× Platinum	Non-album singles
"My Girl" (with Fancy Inc)	2019	–	–	–	–	Pro-Música: 3× Platinum	Non-album singles
"In the Dark" (with Fancy Inc)	2019	–	–	32	1	Pro-Música: Diamond	Non-album singles
"Intro (Rework) [Remix]" (with Bruno Be, Öwnboss and Ashibah)	2019	–	–	–	–		Non-album singles
"Deep Inside of Me" (with Adam K featuring MKLA)	2020	–	–	–	41	Pro-Música: 3× Platinum	Non-album singles
"Bros"	2020	–	–	–	–	Pro-Música: 2× Platinum	Non-album singles
"Things" (with Wolf Player and Jets)	2020	–	–	–	–		Non-album singles
"Coffee (Give Me Something)" (with Tiësto)	2020	–	–	44	–	Pro-Música: Platinum	Non-album singles
"Happy" (with Fancy Inc and Drunky Daniels)	2020	–	–	–	–		Non-album singles
"It Is What It Is" (featuring Elise LeGrow)	2020	–	–	–	–	Pro-Música: Platinum	Non-album singles
"Time" (with Frank La Costa and Superjava)	2020	–	–	–	–		Vintage Culture & Friends, Vol. 4
"Terrified" (with Kvsh and Bruno Be featuring The Beach)	2020	–	–	–	–		Vintage Culture & Friends, Vol. 4
"Splice & Dice"	2020	–	–	–	–		Vintage Culture & Friends, Vol. 4
"Show Me the Way" (with Fm Laeti and Shapeless featuring Padox)	2020	–	–	–	–		Vintage Culture & Friends, Vol. 4
"Cali Dreams" (with Fancy Inc featuring The Beach)	2021	–	–	–	–	Pro-Música: 2× Platinum	Non-album singles
"Free" (with Fancy Inc and Roland Clark)	2021	–	–	–	–		Non-album singles
"Butterflies" (with FFlora and Meca featuring Tristan Henry)	2021	–	–	–	–		Non-album singles
"Last Thought" (with Sunny Fodera featuring Mkla)	2021	–	–	–	–		Non-album singles
"You Give Me a Feeling" (with James Hype)	2021	–	–	–	–		Non-album singles
"Coming Home" (with Leftwing & Kody featuring Anabel Englund)	2021	–	–	–	–		Non-album singles
"Nightjar" (with Sonny Fedora featuring Shells)	2022	–	–	–	–		Non-album singles
"Amanhã"	2022	–	–	–	–		Non-album singles
"Commotion" (with Maxi Jazz)	2022	–	–	–	–		Non-album singles
"Under Pressure" (with Meduza)	2022	–	–	–	–		Non-album singles
"Take Me (To the Sunrise)" (with Shouse)	2025	45	–	–	–		Non-album singles
"Lost" (with Gabss)	2026	–	10	–	–		Non-album singles
"—" denotes a recording that did not chart or was not released in that territory. "*" denotes that the chart did not exist at that time.

=== Remixes ===
- 2016: Sofi Tukker — Drinkee (Vintage Culture Remix)
- 2016: Joy Corporation — Do You Remember (Vintage Culture Remix)
- 2017: Martin Garrix and Troye Sivan - There For You (Vintage Culture and Kohen Remix)
- 2018: Bob Sinclar - World Hold On (Vintage Culture and Dubdogz Remix)
- 2019: Martin Garrix featuring Macklemore and Patrick Stump of Fall Out Boy - Summer Days (Vintage Culture and Bruno Be Remix)
- 2020: Maverick Sabre featuring Jorja Smith - Slow Down (Vintage Culture and Slow Motion Remix)
- 2020: Rompasso - Paradise (Vintage Culture Remix)
- 2020: Winona Oak and Robin Schulz - Oxygen (Vintage Culture and Fancy Inc Remix)
- 2020: Moby featuring Mindy Jones - My Only Love (Vintage Culture Remix)
- 2020: Felix Jaehn featuring Nea and Bryn Christopher - No Therapy (Vintage Culture Remix)
- 2021: Bob Moses and Zhu - Desire (Vintage Culture & Kiko Franco Remix)
- 2021: Louie Vega and Marc E. Bassy - Let It Go (Vintage Culture Remix)
- 2021: Meduza - Paradise (Vintage Culture Remix)
- 2021: Steve Angello, Laidback Luke, and Robin S - Show Me Love (Vintage Culture Remix)
- 2021: John Summit - Beauty Sleep (Vintage Culture Remix)
- 2021: Tiësto - The Business (Vintage Culture and Dubdogz Remix)
- 2021: Aleyna Tilki - Retrograde (Vintage Culture Remix)
- 2021: Diplo featuring Elderbrook and Andhim - One By One (Vintage Culture Remix)
- 2021: Rüfüs Du Sol - Next to Me (Vintage Culture Remix)
- 2021: Claptone featuring Seal - Just A Ghost (Vintage Culture Remix)
- 2021: Kasablanca - Hold Me Close (Vintage Culture Remix)
- 2021: Burns - Talamanca (Vintage Culture Remix)
- 2021: Chris Lorenzo - California Dreamin' (with High Jinx) [Vintage Culture Remix]

=== Music videos ===
Year	Title
2016	"Hollywood"
2016	"Slowing Down"
2015	"Eyes"
2017	"Memories"
2018	"Save Me"
2019	"Yesterday"

== Web series ==
=== On the Road ===
In its tenth episode, the web series can be considered a mini documentary about the life and career of Vintage Culture. In the series, the testimony of Vintage Culture is interspersed with behind-the-scenes footage, concerts and studio sessions, and some periods off with friends.

=== WKND Hi Lights ===
In short videos of one minute on average, Vintage Culture presents to the public a summary of weekends.

== Awards and nominations ==
Year	Award	Nominated work	Category	Result
2015	DJ Mag	Vintage Culture	Top 101-150 DJs	No. 118
2016	DJ Mag	Vintage Culture	Top 100 DJs	No. 54
2017	DJ Mag	Vintage Culture	Top 100 DJs	No. 31
2018	DJ Mag	Vintage Culture	Top 100 DJs	No. 19
2019	DJ Mag	Vintage Culture	Top 100 DJs	No. 47
2020	DJ Mag	Vintage Culture	Top 100 DJs	No. 30
2021	DJ Mag	Vintage Culture	Top 100 DJs	No. 17
2022	DJ Mag	Vintage Culture	Top 100 DJs	No. 11
2023	DJ Mag	Vintage Culture	Top 100 DJs	No. 10
2024	DJ Mag	Vintage Culture	Top 100 DJs	No. 9
2024	Berlin Music Video Awards	Best Editor	"Fallen Leaf" (with Fideles featuring Be No Rain)	Nominated
2025	Berlin Music Video Awards	Best Cinematography	"Pleasure Chasers"	Nominated

=== House Mag ===
No. 2 Top 50 DJs (2015)

=== Rio Music Conference ===
Melhor DJ Big Room (2015)
