= Best Friend (Sofi Tukker song) =

2017 single by Sofi Tukker

Single by Sofi Tukker featuring Nervo, The Knocks and Alisa Ueno

from the album Treehouse
- Released: September 12, 2017
- Recorded: August 2017
- Length: 3:03
- Label: Sofi Tukker; Ultra
- Songwriters: Miriam Nervo; Olivia Nervo; James Patterson; Sophie Hawley-Weld; Tucker Halpern; Alisa Ueno; Hiromi Kawanabe
- Producer: Sofi Tukker

Sofi Tukker singles chronology
| "F**k They" (2017) | "Best Friend" (2017) | "Energia" (2017) |

Music video
- "Best Friend" on YouTube

"Best Friend" is a song by American duo Sofi Tukker featuring Australian duo Nervo, American duo The Knocks and Japanese singer Alisa Ueno. It was released on September 12, 2017, as the third single from their debut album Treehouse. It was also featured in a commercial for the iPhone X.

== Composition ==
The song is written in the key of B minor.

== Music video ==
The music video was uploaded on October 25, 2017, by Ultra Music.

== Chart performance ==
The track reached number one on Billboard's Dance/Mix Show Airplay chart in its January 20, 2018 issue, giving the four acts their first chart topper, and their best showing anywhere on the Billboard charts.

== Usage in media ==
The song was featured in a commercial for Apple's iPhone X. The song is a part of FIFA 18 soundtrack. It was also used in the advertisement of Friends Ultra Marathons on Comedy Central India. In 2017, the song was featured during a prominent scene in TNT's "Good Behavior" episode titled "It's No Fun If It's Easy". In 2018, the song was featured in the end credits of Netflix's Santa Clarita Diet episode titled "Suspicious Objects", and in the film Oceans 8. The song is also the opening and closing theme, and bumper music to the MLB Network show MLB Central.

== Track listing ==
Digital download
| No. | Title | Length |
|---|---|---|
| 1. | "Best Friend" (featuring Nervo, The Knocks and Alisa Ueno) | 3:04 |

Digital download – remixes
| No. | Title | Length |
|---|---|---|
| 1. | "Best Friend" (Sofi Tukker Carnaval Remix) (featuring Nervo, The Knocks and Alisa Ueno) | 3:44 |
| 2. | "Best Friend" (Nervo & Jeff Retro's Let's Get Busy Remix) (featuring Nervo, The Knocks and Alisa Ueno) | 4:01 |
| 3. | "Best Friend" (Sinego Remix) (featuring Nervo, The Knocks and Alisa Ueno) | 3:40 |
| 4. | "Best Friend" (featuring Nervo, The Knocks and Alisa Ueno) | 3:03 |

== Charts ==
=== Weekly charts ===
| Chart (2017–2018) | Peak position |
|---|---|
| Belarus Airplay (Eurofest) | 11 |
| Belgium (Ultratop 50 Flanders) | 10 |
| Belgium Dance (Ultratop Flanders) | 1 |
| Belgium (Ultratip Bubbling Under Wallonia) | 1 |
| Belgium Dance (Ultratop Wallonia) | 11 |
| Canada Hot 100 (Billboard) | 61 |
| CIS Airplay (TopHit) | 9 |
| Colombia (National-Report) | 95 |
| France (SNEP) | 86 |
| Hungary (Single Top 40) | 13 |
| Israel (Media Forest) | 8 |
| Mexico Ingles Airplay (Billboard) | 45 |
| Netherlands (Dutch Tipparade) | 1 |
| Ukraine Airplay (TopHit) | 45 |
| US Billboard Hot 100 | 81 |
| US Adult Pop Airplay (Billboard) | 28 |
| US Dance Club Songs (Billboard) | 14 |
| US Pop Airplay (Billboard) | 18 |
| US Hot Dance/Electronic Songs (Billboard) | 5 |
| US Rock & Alternative Airplay (Billboard) | 15 |

=== Year-end charts ===
| Chart (2018) | Position |
|---|---|
| Belgium (Ultratop Flanders) | 82 |
| CIS (Tophit) | 43 |
| Russia Airplay (Tophit) | 42 |
| Ukraine Airplay (Tophit) | 124 |
| US Hot Dance/Electronic Songs (Billboard) | 17 |
| Chart (2019) | Position |
| CIS (Tophit) | 186 |
| Ukraine Airplay (Tophit) | 84 |

== Certifications ==
| Region | Certification | Certified units/sales |
|---|---|---|
| Canada (Music Canada) | Platinum | 80,000^{‡} |
| Mexico (AMPROFON) | Gold | 30,000^{‡} |
| United States (RIAA) | Gold | 500,000^{‡} |
^{‡} Sales+streaming figures based on certification alone.

== Release history ==
| Region | Date | Format | Label | Ref. |
|---|---|---|---|---|
| United States | September 12, 2017 | Digital download | Sofi Tukker; Ultra | |
| United States | December 8, 2017 | Digital download (Remixes EP) | Sofi Tukker; Ultra | |
