= Sofi Tukker =

American musical duo

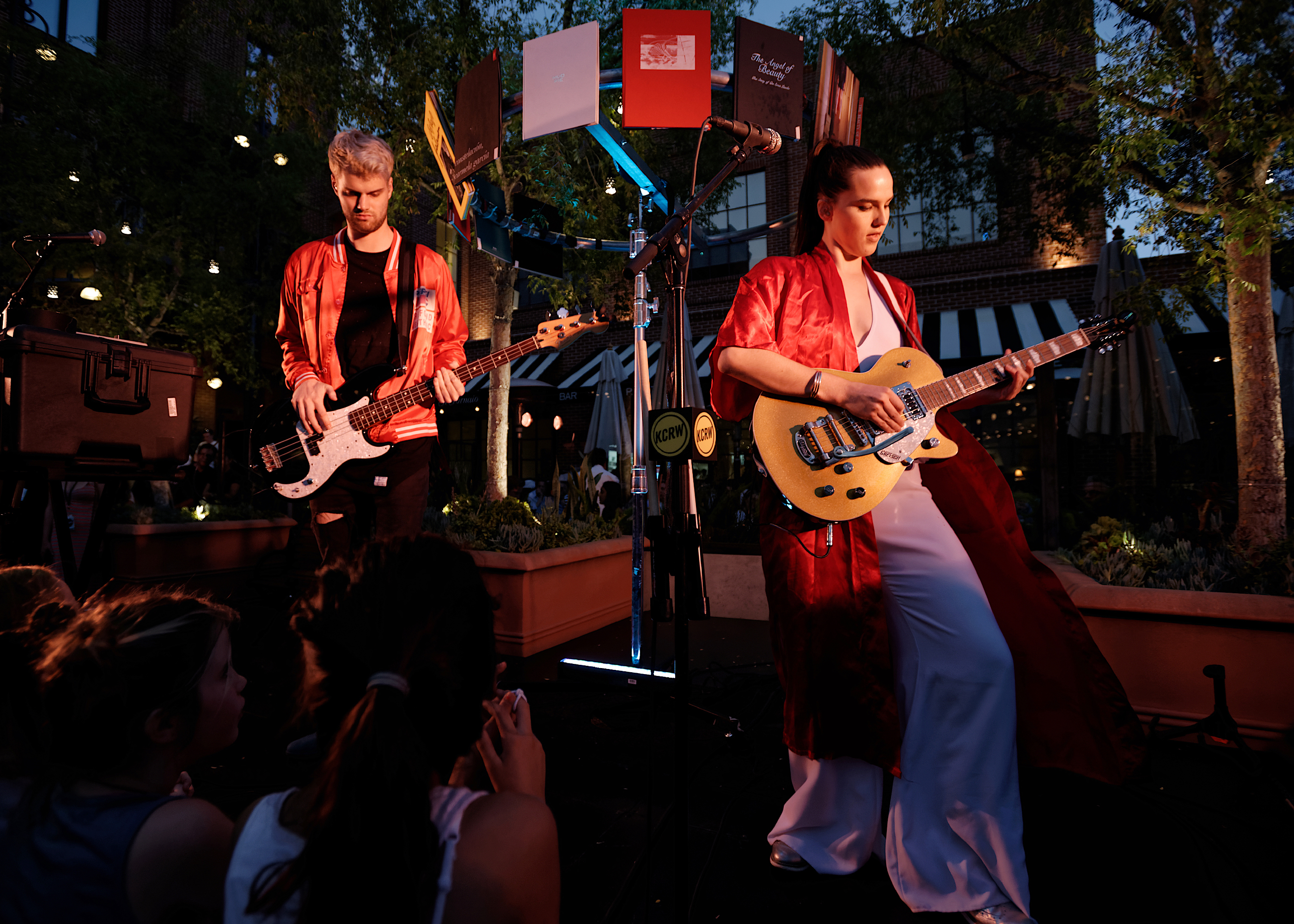
- Sofi Tukker performing in 2016

Background information
- Origin: New York City, U.S.
- Genres: House; EDM
- Years active: 2014–present
- Label: Republic
- Members: Sophie Hawley-Weld; Tucker Halpern
- Website: sofitukker.com

Sofi Tukker (stylized "SOFI TUKKER") is an American musical DJ duo based in New York City, consisting of Sophie Hawley-Weld and Tucker Halpern. They are known for their songs "Drinkee", "Best Friend", and "Purple Hat". "Best Friend" was featured in a commercial during Apple's unveiling of the iPhone X, while "Drinkee" was nominated for a Grammy at the 2017 Grammy Awards. In December 2018, their album Treehouse was nominated for a Grammy for Best Dance/Electronic Album.

== History ==
Sofi Tukker is the duo of Sophie Hawley-Weld and Tucker Halpern.

Sophie Hawley-Weld was born in Frankfurt, Germany, but grew up in rural Canada (Port Perry Ontario) and Atlanta. She then attended United World College of the Adriatic, a UWC in Duino, Italy. While in college Hawley-Weld studied Portuguese; her love for Brazilian culture and the Portuguese language inspired a move to Brazil afterwards, to further learn the language and collaborate with local poets and artists.

Tucker Halpern was born in Brookline, Massachusetts. Growing up, he was a basketball player who was recruited by Noble and Greenough School, ending up at Brown University where he played three years and was the captain for a year. Due to an illness, he changed his career, started DJing, occasionally with musician Nicolas Jaar, and concentrated on making music.

Halpern and Hawley-Weld first met at Brown University in 2014 at an art gallery where Hawley-Weld was performing. Halpern approached her and they began writing and performing songs together. They then moved to New York City to focus on their artist projects and performing. After an accident that left Hawley-Weld in a wheelchair for four months, the two had to maintain their relationship over Skype calls. This gave Hawley-Weld an opportunity to learn how to use Ableton Live.

Sofi Tukker released an EP, Soft Animals on July 8, 2016. The EP includes "Drinkee", "Matadora", "Awoo", "Déjà Vu Affair", "Moon Tattoo", and "Hey Lion". The title comes from the 1986 Mary Oliver poem “Wild Geese” ("You only have to let the soft animal of your body love what it loves").

Their song "Drinkee" from the Soft Animals EP was nominated for a 2017 Grammy for Best Dance Recording. "Drinkee" is adapted from a poem written by the Brazilian poet Chacal, sung sensually amidst cowbells, bongos, electric guitars and deep driving bass. The song is featured in The Incredible Jessica James.

In June 2019, "Feeling Good" played in the trailer for the television series Dead to Me. This track was also featured in the soundtrack of the 2020 feature film Birds of Prey.

On April 24, 2020, Australian radio station Triple J premiered a new song created by the duo titled "When the Rona's Over", as part of a COVID-19 self-isolation musical challenge nicknamed Quarantune.

Sofi Tukker began DJing while sheltering at home due to the COVID-19 outbreak, reaching 400 performances on April 19, 2021. Along the way, the show was expanded to Twitch, Facebook, Discord, Instagram Live. A social media-connected community of fans, known as the "Freak Fam", have even formed their own channels and held Zoom dance parties during the livestream.

In February 2022, Sofi Tukker debuted "Original Sin", the first single from their upcoming second album Wet Tennis. Sofi Tukker's second studio album Wet Tennis was released on April 29, 2022.

Sofi Tukker performed at the 22nd Coachella Valley Music and Arts Festival in April 2023.

In May 2025 they released their new album, butter, exploring diverse brazilian genres such as samba, MPB, bossa nova, brazilian funk and carimbó and featuring brazilian artists such as Seu Jorge and Liniker.

== Features and appearances ==
Their song "Johny" is featured in EA Sports' FIFA 17, and was adapted from a poem by Brazilian poet Paulo Leminski.

Their 2017 song "Best Friend" was played during the iPhone X full commercial reveal at the Apple Event on September 12, 2017. It is also included in the football game FIFA 18, the second straight year that a song of theirs has been included on the soundtrack of FIFA. It is also playing in the club scene in the 2018 movie Ocean's 8, as well as during The Block Season 17 Episode 32 'Living & Dinings Continue'.

The clean version of their song "Batshit", titled "That's It (I'm Crazy)", was featured in a TV commercial for Apple promoting their special edition iPhone 8 RED smartphone in 2018.

Both "Best Friend" and "Batshit" were featured in the episode "Robert Diaz (No. 15)" (season 6, episode 22) of the TV series The Blacklist.

On June 28, 2018, they collaborated with Italian DJ Benny Benassi for the single "Everybody Needs a Kiss", and on September 14, 2018, they released a remix of "Energia" with Brazilian singer Pabllo Vittar.

"Baby I'm a Queen" is featured in Xbox Game Studios' Forza Horizon 4.

"Purple Hat" is featured in Netflix's To All the Boys: P.S. I Still Love You.

"Swing" is featured in EA Sports' FIFA 20 and Need for Speed Heat. which also features "Playa Grande" and "Mi Rumba".

"Good Time Girl" is featured during the opening credits of HBO's series The New Pope.

"Fuck They" is featured in Season 4 of the Spanish television series Elite.

"Wet Tennis" is featured in Season 1 of Ubisoft's Just Dance 2023 Edition.

"Cafuné" is featured in EA Sports' FC25.

== Reception ==
Paste magazine described the band's release Soft Animals as "an insatiable dance collection of jungle-pop songs with many well-executed nods towards Brazilian instruments, poets and to the national language, Portuguese". The magazine's review referred to the "carefully conceptualized 'Matadora'" as "the album's show-stopper".

Slant Magazine said of their album Treehouse, "the songs on Sofi Tukker's Treehouse are alternately playful and sincere, intimate and global." "Though Sofi Tukker's mélange of disparate sounds and influences—bossa-nova rhythms, cowbells, castanets, and spaghetti-western guitars—lends Treehouse an air of worldly sophistication, Hawley-Weld and Halpern never take themselves or their music too seriously. But that doesn't mean we shouldn't."

== Discography ==
=== Studio albums ===
List of studio albums
Title	Details	Peak chart positions					
Title	Details	US Dance	US Heat.	BEL (FL)	CAN	LIT	NZ Heat.
Treehouse	Released: April 13, 2018; Label: Ultra Music; Formats: CD, LP, digital download	5	6	66	54	—	9
Wet Tennis	Released: April 29, 2022; Label: Ultra Music; Formats: CD, LP, digital download	12	—	—	—	77	—
Bread	Released: August 23, 2024; Label: Virgin Music Group; Formats: CD, LP, digital download	—	—	—	—	—	—
butter	Released: May 16, 2025; Label: Formats:	—	—	—	—	—	—
"—" denotes a recording that did not chart or was not released.

=== Extended plays ===
List of extended plays
Title	Details	Peak
Title	Details	US Dance
Soft Animals	Released: July 8, 2016; Label: Self-released; Formats: CD, LP, digital download	14
Spotify Singles	Released: October 31, 2018; Label: Self-released; Formats: Streaming	—
Dancing on the People	Released: September 20, 2019; Label: Ultra Music, Sony Music Entertainment; Formats: CD, LP, streaming, digital download	—
"—" denotes a recording that did not chart or was not released.

=== Singles ===
==== As lead artist ====
Title	Year	Peak chart positions										Certifications	Album
Title	Year	US	US Alt.	US Dance	AUS	BEL (FL)	CAN	FRA Down.	ITA	NZ Hot	SWE Heat.	Certifications	Album
"Drinkee"	2015	—	—	—	42	—	—	—	43	—	—	ARIA: Platinum	Soft Animals
"Matadora"	2016	—	—	—	—	—	—	—	—	—	—		Soft Animals
"Hey Lion"	2016	—	—	—	—	—	—	—	—	—	—		Soft Animals
"Déjà Vu Affair"	2016	—	—	—	—	—	—	—	—	—	—		Soft Animals
"Awoo" (featuring Betta Lemme)	2016	—	—	—	—	—	—	—	—	—	—		Soft Animals
"Johny"	2017	—	—	—	—	—	—	—	—	—	—		Treehouse
"Greed"	2017	—	—	—	—	—	—	—	—	—	—		Non-album single
"Fuck They"	2017	—	—	—	—	—	—	—	—	—	—		Treehouse
"Best Friend" (featuring Nervo, The Knocks and Alisa Ueno)	2017	81	15	5	—	10	61	86	—	—	—	MC: Platinum; RIAA: Gold	Treehouse
"Energia"	2017	—	—	—	—	—	—	—	—	—	—		Treehouse
"Baby I'm a Queen"	2018	—	—	—	—	—	—	—	—	—	—		Treehouse
"Batshit"	2018	—	—	22	—	—	—	47	—	—	—	MC: Gold	Treehouse
"That's It (I'm Crazy)"	2018	—	—	16	—	—	—	67	—	—	—		Non-album singles
"Energia (Parte 2)" (with Pabllo Vittar)	2018	—	—	—	—	—	—	—	—	—	—		Non-album singles
"Benadryl"	2018	—	—	—	—	—	—	—	—	—	—		Treehouse
"Mi Rumba" (with Zhu)	2019	—	—	—	—	—	—	—	—	—	—		Non-album single
"Fantasy"	2019	—	—	—	—	—	—	—	—	—	—		Dancing on the People
"Playa Grande" (with Bomba Estéreo)	2019	—	—	—	—	—	—	—	—	—	—		Dancing on the People
"Swing" (solo or featuring Allday)	2019	—	—	—	—	—	—	—	—	—	—		Dancing on the People
"Purple Hat"	2019	—	—	15	23	—	—	—	—	32	9	ARIA: Platinum; MC: Gold	Dancing on the People
"House Arrest" (with Gorgon City)	2020	—	—	21	—	—	—	—	—	—	—		Olympia
"Emergency" (with Novak and Yax.x)	2020	—	—	—	—	—	—	—	—	34	—		Non-album singles
"Spa" (with Icona Pop)	2020	—	—	30	—	—	—	—	—	—	—		Non-album singles
"It Don't Matter" (with Alok and Inna)	2021	—	—	27	—	—	—	—	—	—	—		Non-album singles
"Mon Cheri" (with Amadou & Mariam)	2021	—	—	—	—	—	—	—	—	—	—		Wet Tennis
"Sun Came Up" (with John Summit)	2021	—	—	34	—	—	—	—	—	27	—		Wet Tennis
"Original Sin"	2022	—	—	25	—	—	—	—	—	21	—		Wet Tennis
"Forgive Me" (with Mahmut Orhan)	2022	—	—	47	—	—	—	—	—	—	—		Wet Tennis
"Kakee"	2022	—	—	—	—	—	—	—	—	—	—		Wet Tennis
"Sacrifice" (with Kx5)	2023	—	—	26	—	—	—	—	—	—	—		Kx5
"Jacaré"	2023	—	—	38	—	—	—	—	—	—	—		Bread
"Throw Some Ass"	2024	—	—	28	—	—	—	—	—	—	—		Bread
"Hey Homie"	2024	—	—	—	—	—	—	—	—	—	—		Bread
"Woof" (with Kah-Lo)	2024	—	—	31	—	—	—	—	—	—	—		Bread
"Cook" (with J Balvin)	2026	—	—	20	—	—	—	—	—	40	—		Non-album singles
"Manhatten" (with Carlita)	2026		—	—	—	—	—	—	—	—	—		Non-album singles
"Tsunami" (with OneRepublic)	2026	—	—	—	—	—	—	—	—	—	—		Non-album singles
"—" denotes a recording that did not chart or was not released.

==== As featured artist ====
- "Brazilian Soul" (2018) (The Knocks featuring Sofi Tukker)
- "Everybody Needs a Kiss" (2018) (Benny Benassi and Sofi Tukker)
- "Fashion Model Art" (2020) (Haiku Hands featuring Sofi Tukker)

==== Remixes ====
- 2019: Laurent Wolf featuring Eric Carter – "No Stress" (Sofi Tukker Remix)
- 2019: Muna – "Number One Fan" (Sofi Tukker Remix)
- 2020: Vintage Culture and Adam K featuring Mkla – "Deep Inside Of Me" (Sofi Tukker Remix)
- 2020: Lady Gaga – "911" (Sofi Tukker Remix)
- 2021: Rodrigo y Gabriela and Pelé – "Acredita No Véio (Listen To The Old Man)" (Sofi Tukker Remix)
- 2021: Rema – "Woman" (Sofi Tukker Remix)
- 2021: Jan Blomqvist and Bloom Twins – "High On Beat" (Sofi Tukker Remix)

=== Other charted songs ===
Title	Year	Peak chart positions	Album
Title	Year	US Dance	Album
"Good Time Girl"	2020	47	Treehouse
"Feeling Good"	2020	31	Birds of Prey: The Album
"Summer in New York"	2022	27	Wet Tennis

== Awards and nominations ==
=== Grammy Awards ===
Year	Nominee / work	Award	Result
2017	"Drinkee"	Best Dance Recording	Nominated
2019	Treehouse	Best Dance/Electronic Album	Nominated

=== iHeartRadio Music Awards ===
Year	Nominee / work	Award	Result
2023	Sofi Tukker	Dance Artist of the Year	Nominated

== See also ==
- List of artists who reached number one on the U.S. dance airplay chart
