= Purple Hat =

2019 single by Sofi Tukker

Single by Sofi Tukker

from the album Dancing on the People
- Released: September 6, 2019
- Length: 2:58
- Label: Ultra
- Songwriters: Jon Hume; Joshua Hoisington; Richard Beynon; Sophie Hawley-Weld; Tucker Halpern
- Producers: Bynon; Sofi Tukker

Sofi Tukker singles chronology
"Swing" (2019)	"Purple Hat" (2019)	"House Arrest" (2020)

Music video
- "Purple Hat" on YouTube

"Purple Hat" is a song by American house music duo Sofi Tukker. It was released on September 6, 2019 via Ultra, as a single from their third extended play Dancing on the People.

== Background ==
The duo said in an interview: "We wrote 'Purple Hat' the day after our first Animal Talk party. We started throwing these parties to bring back the wild and inclusive dancing vibe to the nightclub experience. Tuck was literally wearing a purple hat and a cheetah print shirt, people were climbing on top of people, it was over sold out and sweaty, our favorite people were packed in the booth, everyone was loose af and feeling themselves. It was wild. Every Animal Talk party since then has been like that and we wanted to capture that raw feeling in a song. If there was a song that included everything we are about, this would be the one." The music video, directed by Charles Todd, premiered on December 10, 2019.

== Charts ==
=== Weekly charts ===
Chart (2019–2020)	Peak position
Australia (ARIA)	23
Belgium (Ultratip Bubbling Under Flanders)	4
Belgium (Ultratip Bubbling Under Wallonia)	22
New Zealand Hot Singles (RMNZ)	32
Sweden Heatseeker (Sverigetopplistan)	9
US Hot Dance/Electronic Songs (Billboard)	15

=== Year-end charts ===
Chart (2020)	Position
Australia (ARIA)	58
US Hot Dance/Electronic Songs (Billboard)	50

== Certifications ==
Region	Certification	Certified units/sales
Canada (Music Canada)	Platinum	80,000^{‡}
New Zealand (RMNZ)	2× Platinum	60,000^{‡}
United States (RIAA)	Gold	500,000^{‡}
^{‡} Sales+streaming figures based on certification alone.
