= Chemical Surf =

Brazilian electronic music duo

- Origin: Maringá, Brazil
- Genres: Electronica; Tech House; Progressive House
- Years active: 2005–present
- Labels: Spinnin' Records, STMPD, DimMak, Musical Freedom, Armada, Sony Music
- Members: Lucas Sanches; Hugo Sanches

Chemical Surf is a Brazilian electronic music production duo formed by Lucas and Hugo Sanches.

== Career ==
With constant tours around the world, the duo has accumulated more than 400 million streams on streaming platforms, with singles like "Hey Hey Hey", "Pararam", "I Wanna Do", "Feeling Good", "Terremoto", among others. Chemical Surf's has performed at some of the world's leading music festivals, such as Tomorrowland, Rock In Rio, Lollapalooza and Creamfields.

The duo has produced and released tracks with artists such as Tiësto, Kaskade, Gabriel O Pensador, Vintage Culture, as well as Afrojack, Steve Aoki, and R3hab. Chemical Surf's music has been released by some of the main electronic music labels, such as Spinnin' Records, STMPD, DimMak, Musical Freedom, Armada, Sony Music, among others.

== Discography ==
=== Main Singles ===
- "Hey Hey Hey" (2017)
- "Feeling Good" (2017)
- "I Wanna Do" (2019)
- "Pararam" (2019)
- "Terremoto" (2020)
- "Interstelar" (2020)
