= Coffee (Give Me Something) =

Single by Tiësto and Vintage Culture
- Released: 14 August 2020
- Recorded: 2020
- Genre: Melodic house
- Length: 3:09
- Label: Musical Freedom; Spinnin'
- Songwriters: Tijs Verwest; Lucas Ruiz Hespanhol; Andrew Bullimore; Jon Maguire; Steve Manovski; Corey Sanders
- Producers: Tiësto; Vintage Culture

Tiësto singles chronology
"Nothing Really Matters" (2020)	"Coffee (Give Me Something)" (2020)	"The Business" (2020)

Vintage Culture singles chronology
"Things" (2020)	"Coffee (Give Me Something)" (2020)	"Happy" (2020)

"Coffee (Give Me Something)" is a song by Dutch disc jockey and producer Tiësto and Brazilian disc jockey and producer Vintage Culture. It was released on 14 August 2020 in the Netherlands.

== Background and release ==
Tiësto declared about the song : "When we heard the vocal for 'Coffee', we immediately had a ton of inspiration to work on this. And quarantine gave us a lot of time to try different versions and perfect the record. [...] It’s something for home playlists but also for the club." Vintage Culture described then : "The challenge was finding the right song. With ‘Coffee (Give Me Something)’, we’ve created a track that will make the fans dance, combined with a melody they will remember long after the song is over."

== Track listing ==
Digital Download

1. "Coffee (Give Me Something)" - 3:09

Digital Download - Quintino Remix

1. "Coffee (Give Me Something)" (Quintino Remix) - 2:31

Digital Download - Ferreck Dawn Remix

1. "Coffee (Give Me Something)" (Ferreck Dawn Femix) - 2:52

Digital Download - Jose Amnesia Remix

1. "Coffee (Give Me Something)" (Jose Amnesia Remix) - 5:17

Digital Download - IFK Remix

1. "Coffee (Give Me Something)" (IFK Remix) - 3:38

== Charts ==
Chart performance for "Coffee (Give Me Something)"
Chart (2020)	Peak position
Belgium Dance (Ultratop Flanders)	43
US Hot Dance/Electronic Songs (Billboard)	44

== Certifications ==
Certifications for "Coffee (Give Me Something)"
Region	Certification	Certified units/sales
Brazil (Pro-Música Brasil)	Platinum	40,000^{‡}
^{‡} Sales+streaming figures based on certification alone.
