= Alisa Ueno =

Japanese musician and fashion designer

Alisa Ueno 植野有砂
- Born: 21 December 1989 (age 36); Tokyo, Japan
- Occupations: Singer; DJ; model; fashion designer; businessperson; internet personality

Alisa Ueno (Japanese: 植野有砂, born 21 December 1989) is a Japanese singer, disk jockey, model, fashion designer, businessperson, and internet personality based in Tokyo. She is best known for featuring on the Sofi Tukker song "Best Friend", alongside Nervo and the Knocks.

== Early life ==
Ever since Ueno was a child, her wish was to go abroad, influenced by her father who traveled often. Her aspiration to learn English formed since the fifth grade of elementary school, when her family went to a Janet Jackson concert. She went from a public elementary school in Tokyo to a private integrated middle and high school for girls. Unlike her classmates that were fans of domestic idols, she was inspired by Destiny's Child and Paris Hilton. Ueno got scouted by a modeling agency in the downtown area, but her entertainment activities were forbidden by the school's rules. As a result, she dropped out of high school in her second year and then transferred to a metropolitan high school. In 2007, she made her modeling debut for a magazine cover. While working as a model, Ueno attended an English prep school, with a goal to get into college. She eventually entered the Department of English Language and Literature at Seisen University.

== Career ==
While Ueno was a university student, she started a DJ career in addition to modeling. In 2011, she created an apparel brand FIG & VIPER, being in charge of product planning and promotion as the creative director.

She has acted in giant summer beach music festivals like Electric Zoo and giant domestic music festival like Electrox, and also she has acted in big night clubs in Japan and overseas. Other than her main act performances, she performed opening acts for Nervo (NO.1 female DJ on DJ Mag Top 100), Afrojack, Diplo and Lil Jon. She also worked with well-known artist like Steve Aoki and Charli XCX.

In 2015, she joined Nervo's "Hey Ricky (featuring Kreayshawn, Dev and Alisa)" as a featuring artist and debuted worldwide as a singer.

From 2016 she was selected as Night Ambassador of Shibuya 3 years in a row, and she was also selected as the life of party for Japanese dance music scene.

In 2017, she joined a tour for world-famous samurai guitarist Miyavi as a back DJ, and she performed at many music festivals and parties. Including her performances at worldwide fashion brand Fendi and beauty brand Yves Saint Laurent Beaute events she performs more than 120 times a year.

She joined Sofi Tukker’s song "Best Friend (feat. Nervo, The Knocks & Alisa Ueno)". This song which she joined as a songwriter and featuring artist was on Top 100 US (Hot 100) single chart for 5 weeks in a row. She is the 8th Japanese person and 3rd Japanese solo female artist of all time to be on this record. Furthermore, " Best friend (feat. Nervo, The Knocks & Alisa Ueno)" was used as global TV commercial song of Apple "iPhone X", global underwear brand Triumph’s TV commercial song, and for soundtrack of the video game "FIFA 18" and also was used as background music for the movie "Ocean's 8" and so on. In addition, the song was number 1 on iTunes Dance chart for 26 countries, and it was number 1 on Japanese Shazam chart.

== Discography ==
=== Singles ===
Title	Year	Peak chart positions								Album
Title	Year	BEL	CAN	FRA	HUN	MEX	NL	TUR	US	Album
"Hey Ricky" (Nervo featuring Kreayshawn, Dev and ALISA)	2015									Collateral
"Best Friend" (Sofi Tukker featuring Nervo, the Knocks and Alisa Ueno)	2017	10	61	86	13	45	1	2	81	Treehouse
"Is That It" (Alisa Ueno & Vigiletti)	2018									
