= Drinkee =

Single by Sofi Tukker

from the EP Soft Animals
- Released: October 2, 2015
- Recorded: 2015
- Genre: Indietronica; house
- Length: 4:59
- Label: Sofi Tukker; Ultra
- Songwriters: Sophie Hawley-Weld; Tucker Halpern; Ricardo de Carvalho Duarte
- Producer: Sofi Tukker

Sofi Tukker singles chronology
"Drinkee" (2015)	"Hey Lion" (2016)

"Drinkee" is the debut single by American musical duo Sofi Tukker. It was released independently in October 2015, and re-released by Ultra Records in April 2016.

The song is inspired by the poem "Relógio" by Brazilian poet Chacal. The lyrics are sung in the original language of Portuguese. According to vocalist Sophie Hawley-Weld, "It doesn't matter whether or not you can understand Portuguese. The point of "Drinkee" isn't the meaning; the point is the nonsense." In the song, Hawley-Weld's voice fuses together with layered underlying sounds that include distorted electric guitar, a strong bass line, bongos and cowbells. The song was nominated for a Grammy Award for Best Dance Recording at the 59th ceremony.

== Video ==
The music video for "Drinkee" was directed by Sam Mason and Matt Daniels, with production design by Jessica Kostelnick and was released on July 1, 2016. The duo stated that the video is not supposed to make any sense; it features scenes of band members staring dead into the camera before a zebra-printed backdrop and deadpanning models wearing brightly-colored outfits.

== Reception ==
Luke Holland from The Guardian said he was not "expecting much from a song called 'Drinkee'... But US duo Sofi Tukker have taken one wiry guitar riff and one indecipherable lyric, and layered them over a fat, throbbing tropical house backbeat. It's my new favourite tune. Tropical house isn't cool, though. Which means, like those people, neither am I."

== Official remixes ==
- Dinnerdate remix – 4:19
- Addal remix – 4:58
- Vintage Culture remix – 5:42
- Mahmut Orhan remix – 4:17
- Livin R Dino Romeo remix – 4:13

== Charts ==
Chart (2016–2017)	Peak position
Australia (ARIA)	42
Italy (FIMI)	43

== Certifications ==
Region	Certification	Certified units/sales
Australia (ARIA)	Platinum	70,000^{‡}
Brazil (Pro-Música Brasil)	2× Platinum	120,000^{‡}
Italy (FIMI)	Gold	25,000^{‡}
New Zealand (RMNZ)	Gold	15,000^{‡}
^{‡} Sales+streaming figures based on certification alone.
