= Betta Lemme =

Canadian singer, songwriter and musician (born 1993)

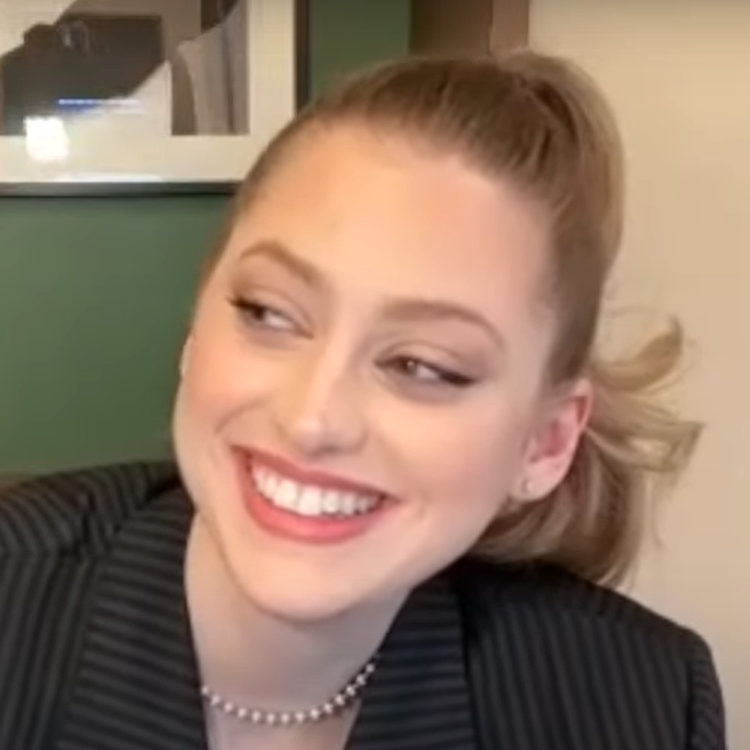

Background information
- Born: Elizabeth Tonya Lemme; April 30, 1993 (age 33); Montreal, Quebec, Canada
- Genres: Pop, dance-pop
- Occupations: Singer; songwriter; record producer; music video director
- Instruments: Vocals, piano, guitar, ukulele
- Years active: 2016–present
- Labels: Ultra (formerly); Betta Lemme
- Website: bettalemme.com

Betta Lemme (born April 30, 1993) is a Canadian singer, songwriter, director and multi-instrumentalist.

== Early life ==
Lemme is born in Montreal, Quebec, Canada. She is Italian-Canadian, with her second-generation Canadian parents being both of Italian descent (from Calabria and Abruzzo). Her first language growing up was Italian; once in Quebec's francophone school system, she began speaking primarily French at home.

At the age of 2, she first became drawn to music when trying to learn the Addams Family theme song on her grandmother's piano.

Betta Lemme attended post-secondary school majoring in photography and film.

Before pursuing a career in music, she worked multiple jobs related to fashion and photography including being a model, working as an independent booking agent and as a social media consultant.

She had been writing and playing music in Montreal, but after being told by a college music professor that she wouldn't be able to study music due to not being able to read music notes and being rejected from music school, she eventually decided to move to New York in 2016 as an attempt to pursue a career in music and find collaborators on her own. While living in New York, Betta happened to rent from Tucker Halpern of the American DJ duo Sofi Tukker. Their friendship led to music collaboration.

== Music career ==
On July 8, 2016, Betta Lemme was featured on a single titled Awoo which she co-wrote with American DJ duo Sofi Tukker. It was released on the duo's self-published debut EP Soft Animals. On October 17 of the same year, a music video for Awoo was released by Ultra Music. The music video with Betta includes dance choreography by her which is also performed live during shows with Sofi Tukker.

Lemme's debut single "Bambola" was released officially on 10 November 2017. The official video released on the same day has reached over 82 million views on YouTube. On 29 January 2018, Lemme made her first-televised debut performing her single, "Bambola" on RAI 1's Che tempo che fa. She appeared as a guest performer on The Voice of Italy 2018, singing "Bambola" with the three finalists. On August 10, 2018, she released Bambola EP.

On June 25, 2021, Betta Lemme released the LGBT-themed song "Girls" coming out about her sexuality.

Betta Lemme released the song and music video for Dance Til Forever, premiering on Rolling Stones Italia on March 8, 2024. After facing years of challenges with releasing her music while preserving creative autonomy under the terms of her record label contract with Ultra Music, this release marked a new chapter for the singer as an independent artist. The song Dance Til Forever explores themes of freedom after a break-up and the music video includes imagery of paperwork and contracts, alluding to Lemme's freedom from bad contracts with her former label. The second song Getaway was released on June 7, 2024. The first single Is Anyone Out There? from the upcoming EP Good Mourning was released on November 15, 2024. The second single and the title track was released on April 18, 2025. The EP was released on May 30, 2025.

On September 5, 2025, Betta Lemme released the song and music video for "Gelosia" featuring Italian rapper BigMama. Like "Bambola", the track is sung in English, Italian and French. It was written by Lemme, BigMama and Ludovica Lazzerini and produced by Lemme and Fiodor Fogliatti.

== Personal life ==
Betta Lemme is fluent in French, English and speaks Italian. She identifies as sexually fluid.

== Features ==
"Kick the Door" was featured in the episode "Rite of Thunder" of Marvel's Runaways in 2019. "Give It" was featured in the closing credit for The Craft: Legacy. The single "Bambola" was featured in the bowling alley date scene in To All the Boys: Always and Forever. The single "Kick The Door" was featured in trailers of the game Riders Republic by Ubisoft. In 2022, the Merk & Kremont Remix of "Bambola" was featured in the scene of Ava and Beatrice dancing in season 2 of Warrior Nun.

== Discography ==
=== Extended plays ===
List of extended plays, with details
Title	Details
Bambola	Released: August 10, 2018; Label: Ultra; Formats: Digital download, streaming
Ready For The Weekend	Released: November 12, 2021; Label: Ultra; Formats: Digital download, streaming
Good Mourning	Released: May 30, 2025; Label: Betta Lemme; Formats: Digital download, streaming

List of singles, with selected chart positions and certifications, showing year released and album name
Title	Year	Peak chart positions		Certifications	Album
Title	Year	FRA	ITA	Certifications	Album
"Bambola"	2017	36	31	FIMI: Gold	Bambola
"Give It"	2018	—	—		Non-album singles
"Kick the Door"	2019	—	—		Non-album singles
"Play"	2019	—	—		Non-album singles
"I'm Bored"	2020	—	—		Non-album singles
"Mommy"	2020	—	—		Non-album singles
"Cry"	2021	—	—		Ready for the Weekend
"Ce Soir"	2021	—	—		Ready for the Weekend
"Girls"	2021	—	—		Ready for the Weekend
"I'm Good"	2021	—	—		Ready for the Weekend
"Dance Til Forever"	2024	—	—		Non-album singles
"Getaway"	2024	—	—		Non-album singles
"Is There Anyone Out There?"	2024	—	—		Good Mourning
"—" denotes a recording that did not chart or was not released in that territory.

=== Other appearances ===
List of other appearances, with other artists, showing year released and album name
Title	Year	Other artist(s)	Album
"Awoo"	2016	Sofi Tukker	Soft Animals
