= Survivor Croatia =

- Nova TV's title card for the series
- Genre: Reality competition
- Based on: Expedition Robinson by Charlie Parsons
- Presented by: Kristijan Potočki (s. 1); Andrija Milošević (s. 2); Marijana Batinić (s. 2); Antonija Blaće (s. 2); Milan Kalinić (s. 2); Mario Mlinarić (s. 3–5); Vlado Boban (s. 6)
- Countries of origin: Croatia; Serbia (s. 2)
- Original language: Croatian
- No. of seasons: 6

Production
- Production location: see below
- Production companies: Hrvatska radiotelevizija (s. 1); Vision Team (s. 2); United Media (s. 3–4)

Original release
- Network: HRT 2
- Release: 12 May – 7 July 2005
- Network: RTL Televizija
- Release: 12 March – 2 June 2012
- Network: Nova TV
- Release: 14 March 2022 – present

Related
- Expedition Robinson; International versions of Survivor

Survivor Croatia is a Croatian reality game show television series based on the international Survivor format. Following the premise of other versions of the Survivor format, the show features a group of contestants, referred to as "castaways" as they are marooned in an isolated location. The castaways must provide food, water, fire, and shelter for themselves. The contestants compete in various challenges for rewards and immunity from elimination. The contestants are progressively eliminated from the game as they are voted off the island by their fellow castaways, or eliminated through challenges. The final castaway remaining is awarded the title of "Sole Survivor" and the grand prize (700,000HRK in season 1, €50,000 in season 2).

The series first aired on HRT 2 in 2005 with the title Survivor: Odisejev otok. It was cancelled the same year. In 2012, the fourth season of Survivor Srbija was broadcast on the Croatian channel RTL Televizija and serves as the second Croatian season of Survivor. The third season, a pan-regional season, premiered March 14, 2022 on Nova TV in Croatia.

== Format ==
=== Seasons 1–2 ===
The formats of the first two seasons differ from each other. The first season's format is similar to the early seasons of the American version, while the second season is similar to the original Robinson series.

The basic premise of both versions is that the players are split up into two tribes and marooned on an island for over a month where they have to provide food, water, fire and shelter for each other. Every few days, the tribes are to compete in a challenge either for a reward (usually food, drinks, comfort, or items that help with camp life), or for immunity. The tribe that wins immunity is safe from elimination and doesn't have to visit Tribal Council, a ceremony where a player is voted out of the tribe.

About halfway into the competition, the tribes are merged, and the challenges become individual. Usually only one person is eligible to win immunity or reward, although there is an occasional team challenge for reward. During this phase of the game, eliminated contestants join the jury. When it's time for the Final Tribal Council (which happens with as few as 2 or as many as 4 players), the contestants don't vote each other out. Instead, the jury listens to the players plead their case, ask questions, and based on the information they've received, cast their vote for the winner. The player with the most voted wins the game and a cash prize. In the first season, though there was a jury system, the public voted for a winner instead. The jurors were also given the right to abstain from voting.

Several twists have been in play as well. At the start of season one, there was a challenge where a player from both tribes was automatically eliminated if they lost. This was most likely inspired by a similar twist from Survivor: Palau, a season that had recently finished airing when Odisejev otok started. In the second season, "The Island of the Banished" was in play. Inspired by Redemption Island from previous versions of the series, The Island of the Banished is a separate island where a contestant is sent after they're voted out. They have to provide shelter, food, fire and water for themselves while they wait for another player to get voted out. When there are two players, they participate in a duel where the loser is sent to the jury (unless they break the rules, in which case they are ejected permanently). The cycle repeats until the merge, where the winner officially rejoins the game and the island is no longer in play. On the last day, the final 6 players competed in a challenge where the two losers were sent to the jury, and the final 4 moved onto the Final Tribal Council.

=== Seasons 3–5 ===
These seasons' format is based on the Turkish version.

20 castaways, 9 from Croatia, 8 from Serbia, 2 from Montenegro, and 1 from Bosnia and Herzegovina, are split up into two tribes based on nationality, with the Croats and Bosnian and one tribe and the Serbs and Montenegrins on the other. Challenges are held almost every day; 2 for Reward and 2 for Immunity. The tribe that wins Immunity does not have to nominate anyone for elimination. After one player from the losing tribe is nominated (or more should the vote end in a deadlock tie), another Immunity Challenge is held with the losing tribe having to nominate someone. Once two or more castaways are nominated, they are to participate in a Duel, with the loser going home. Should a player be pulled from the game for medical reasons, a replacement will join the game and be granted immunity from the first Tribal Council they attend. Additional castaways may also be added.

== Series overview ==
Season		Winner	Runner-up	2nd Runner-up	3rd Runner-up	Vote	Contestants	Days	Tribes	Location	Year
1	Survivor: Odisejev Otok	Vazmenko Pervan	Vedrab Rubrik Šehić	—N/a		68%-32%	20	45	Ammos; Petros; Zoi	Mljet, Croatia	2005
2	Survivor: Costa Rica	Vladimir "Vlada" Vuksanović	Milan Gromilić	Nikola Šoć	Sebastian Fleiss	6-5-2-0	18	37	Matambo; Boruka; Sibu	Corcovado, Costa Rica	2012
Season		Winner		Runner-up			Contestants	Days	Tribes	Location	Year
3	Survivor: Dominican Republic	Stefan Nivistić; Nevena Blanuša		Milica Dabović; Goran Špaleta			25	72	Azua; Mao	Dominican Republic	2022
4	Survivor 2023 (Croatia & Serbia)	Nataša Kondić; Antonia Ivić		Anja Andrejić; Denis Sviličić			25	64	Crveni; Plavi	Dominican Republic	2023
5	Survivor 2024 (Croatia & Serbia)	Luka Rimac; Tijana Jeremić		Mihaela Pavlović; Stefan Arsić			24	90	Crveni; Plavi	Dominican Republic	2024
6	Survivor 2025 (Croatia & Serbia)	Luciano Plazibat; Uroš Čiča		Lara Zavorović; Ksenija Bajić			28	50	Žuti Zeleni	Dominican Republic	2025

=== Season 1 (2005): HRT 2 ===
Influenced by the success of the Croatian version of Big Brother, HRT 2 launched a Croatian version of Survivor. The series featured 20 contestants. A second season was never made by HRT, possibly due to low ratings.

=== Season 2 (2012): RTL ===
The fourth season of Survivor Srbija, the Serbian version of Survivor, serves as the second Croatian edition of Survivor. Alongside the usual host, Andrija Milošević, Croatian TV host Marijana Batinić hosted alongside him on-location. Croatian and Serbian hosts Antonija Blaće and Milan Kalinić also appeared on the show. In a first for Survivor Srbija, the series also featured contestants from Croatia and aired on RTL Televizija, a Croatian TV channel.

=== Seasons 3–6 (2022–present): Nova TV ===
On 14 October 2021, United Group opened applications for a brand new pan-regional version of Survivor. It was filmed in the Dominican Republic. It consisted of players from the ex-Yugoslav region. In Croatia, it premiered on Nova TV in March 2022.

The fourth season premiered on 6 March 2023.

The fifth season debuted on 4 March 2024.

The sixth season debuted on 3 March 2025.

== List of contestants ==
Name	Age	Hometown	Occupation	Season	Finish
Ivan Krželj	Unknown	Split, Croatia	Unknown	Odisejev Otok	20th
Ana Marija Bojko	Unknown			Odisejev Otok	19th
Lidija Šunjerga	37	Unknown		Odisejev Otok	18th
Mirjana Frantal Jadreško	Unknown	Pula, Croatia	Unknown	Odisejev Otok	17th
Iva Jerković	23	Zagreb, Croatia	Unknown	Odisejev Otok	16th
Šaneta Grbavac	34	Unknown		Odisejev Otok	15th
Sasha Pintar	31	Unknown		Odisejev Otok	14th
Dvina Meler	28	Zagreb, Croatia	Unknown	Odisejev Otok	13th
Tea Đurek	31	Zagreb, Croatia	Unknown	Odisejev Otok	12th
Mladen Glavić	Unknown			Odisejev Otok	11th
Vladimir Bambić	45	Zagreb, Croatia	Unknown	Odisejev Otok	10th
Mihajlo Popović	26	Zagreb, Croatia	Unknown	Odisejev Otok	9th
Filip Filipović	25	Zagreb, Croatia	Unknown	Odisejev Otok	8th
Ivica Jurinić	Unknown			Odisejev Otok	7th
Tanja Troskot	35	Zadar, Croatia	Unknown	Odisejev Otok	6th
Mladen Kezele	41	Unknown		Odisejev Otok	5th
Silvija Zelko	Unknown			Odisejev Otok	4th
Kristina Sesar	25	Zagreb, Croatia	Unknown	Odisejev Otok	3rd
Vedran Rubrik Šehić	24	Unknown		Odisejev Otok	Runner-Up
Vazmenko Pervan	Unknown			Odisejev Otok	Winner
Mia Begović	49	Zagreb, Croatia	Actress	VIP: Costa Rica	18th
Jelena Maćić	44	Belgrade, Serbia	Make-up artist	VIP: Costa Rica	17th
Aleksandra Nakova	23	Gevgelija, Macedonia	Model	VIP: Costa Rica	16th
Radovan Stošić	28	Zagreb, Croatia	Model	VIP: Costa Rica	15th
Stanija Dobrojević	27	Ruma, Serbia	TV personality	VIP: Costa Rica	14th
Žarko "Žare" Berber	43	Skopje, Macedonia	TV host	VIP: Costa Rica	13th
Neven Ciganović	42	Zagreb, Croatia	Stylist	VIP: Costa Rica	12th
Marko Karadžić	36	Belgrade, Serbia	Politician	VIP: Costa Rica	11th
Ognjen Kajganić	36	Belgrade, Serbia	Handball player	VIP: Costa Rica	10th
Maja Lena Lopatny	21	Zagreb, Croatia	Student	VIP: Costa Rica	9th
Aleksandra "Aleks" Grdić	33	Virovitica, Croatia	Model	VIP: Costa Rica	8th
Ava Karabatić	24	Split, Croatia	TV personality	VIP: Costa Rica	7th
Martina Vrbos	28	Zagreb, Croatia	Singer	VIP: Costa Rica	6th
Kristina Bekvalac	27	Novi Sad, Serbia	Fashion designer	VIP: Costa Rica	5th
Sebastijan Flajs	29	Samobor, Croatia	Snowboarder	VIP: Costa Rica	3rd runner-up
Nikola Šoć	26	Cetinje, Montenegro	Model	VIP: Costa Rica	2nd runner-up
Milan Gromilić	33	Belgrade, Serbia	Ballet dancer	VIP: Costa Rica	1st runner-up
Vladimir "Vlada" Vuksanović	24	Belgrade, Serbia	Model	VIP: Costa Rica	Winner
Sanja Močibob	37	Umag, Croatia	Student	Dominican Republic	25th
Igor Lazić "Niggor"	51	Kotor, Montenegro	Rapper	Dominican Republic	24th
Ivana Banfić	52	Zagreb, Croatia	Singer	Dominican Republic	23rd
Ivona Koković	31	Prokuplje, Serbia	Life coach	Dominican Republic	22nd
Kristian Rauch	27	Zagreb, Croatia	Personal trainer	Dominican Republic	21st
Hrvoje Habdija	30	Zagreb, Croatia	Skipper	Dominican Republic	20th
Ramiz Gusinac	52	Novi Pazar, Serbia	Hairdresser	Dominican Republic	19th
Viktor Bobić	35	Jablanovec, Croatia	Gym owner	Dominican Republic	18th
Jovana Tomić	24	Belgrade, Serbia	Molecular biologist	Dominican Republic	17th
Ivana Peček	24	Zagreb, Croatia	Fitness centre manager	Dominican Republic	16th

== See also ==
Other versions

- Serbian Survivor
- Slovenian Survivor

Similar shows

- Big Brother Croatia
- The Farm Croatia
