= Survivor 2025 (Croatia & Serbia) =

- Season 2025
- Presented by: Vlado Boban; Bojan Perić
- No. of castaways: 28
- Location: Dominican Republic
- No. of episodes: 50

Release
- Original network: Nova BH (Bosnia and Herzegovina); Nova TV (Croatia); Nova M (Montenegro); Nova S (Serbia)
- Original release: 3 March – 23 May 2025

Season chronology
- ← Previous; Survivor 2024 Next → 2026

Survivor 2025 (Croatia & Serbia) is a joint Croatian and Serbian season of the international reality game show Survivor. It's the sixth season of the show's Croatian version and the eighth season of the Serbian version. It premiered on 3 March 2025 on Nova BH in Bosnia and Herzegovina, Nova TV in Croatia, Nova M in Montenegro, and Nova S in Serbia.

== Background ==
United Group opened applications for the fifth season on 23 September 2024. The show aired on the following TV channels: Nova TV in Croatia, Nova S in Serbia, Nova BH in Bosnia and Herzegovina, and Nova M in Montenegro. Serbian channels reported on Serbian and Montenegrin contestants, while Croatian and Bosnian channels reported on Croatian and Bosnian contestants. In Croatia, changes are taking place, with Nova TV sports journalist Vlado Boban as the new host, while in Serbia, Bojan Perić remains the host, as in previous seasons.

== Contestants ==
They are divided into two teams:

- Žuto pleme (yellow tribe) - Croatia, Bosnia and Herzegovina,
- Zeleno pleme (green tribe) - Serbia, Montenegro

| Contestant | Occupation | Age | From | Tribe | | | Finish |
| Contestant | Occupation | Age | From | Original | New Contestants | Merged | Finish |
|---|---|---|---|---|---|---|---|
| Jelena Putnik | fitness trainer | 43 | (Croatia) Samobor | Žuti | | | Walked; Ep. 4 ^{H} |
| Ivan Takić | videographer | 25 | (Serbia) Vlasotince | Zeleni | | | Walked; Ep. 4 ^{G} |
| Marin Kaselj | waiter | 28 | (Bosnia and Herzegovina) Žepče | Žuti | | | Walked; Ep. 6 ^{H} |
| Aleksa Pavlović | videographer | 25 | (Serbia) Belgrade | Zeleni | | | 1. eliminated Ep. 8 |
| Niki Vranić | model | 28 | (Croatia) Pula | Žuti | | | 2. eliminated Ep. 12 |
| Ida Mikulić | fitness trainer | 25 | (Croatia) Rijeka | | Žuti | | 3. eliminated Ep. 16 |
| Anastasja Pribilović | singer | 22 | (Serbia) Belgrade | Zeleni | | | Walked; Ep. 20 ^{H} |
| Nika Glasnović | digital entrepreneur | 27 | (Serbia) Belgrade (Croatia) Zagreb | Žuti | | | 4. eliminated Ep. 20 |
| Noa Anić Milić | Physiotherapy student | 22 | (Croatia) Karlovac | | Žuti | | 5. eliminated Ep. 24 |
| Matea Josipović | MMA fighter | 20 | (Croatia) Pula | Žuti | | | 6. eliminated Ep. 28 |
| Ana Marković | manicurist | 28 | (Serbia) Belgrade | Zeleni | | | 7. eliminated Ep. 31 |
| Mihailo Vraneš | caterer | 20 | (Montenegro) Pljevlja | Zeleni | | | 8. eliminated Ep. 32 |
| Sandra Krekić | DJ | 25 | (Serbia) Belgrade | | Zeleni | | 9. eliminated Ep. 34 |
| Miloš Andrić | strategic buyer manager | 41 | (Serbia) Belgrade | Zeleni | | | 10. eliminated Ep. 35 |
| Milanka Muždalo | fitness trainer | 34 | (Serbia) Platičevo | Zeleni | | | 11. eliminated Ep. 36 |
| Nina Berić | sales manager | 29 | (Serbia) Novi Sad | Zeleni | | | 12. eliminated Ep. 38 |
| Liz Willems | fitness trainer | 46 | (Croatia) Visoko | Žuti | | | 13. eliminated Ep. 40 |
| Iva Grgurić | Mechanical engineer | 24 | (Croatia) Karlovac | | Žuti | | Walked; Ep. 41 ^{M} |
| Ivan Pernjak | rafting guide | 30 | (Croatia) Delnice | Žuti | | | 14. eliminated Ep. 42 |
| Katarina Matijašević | body combat trainer | 23 | (Serbia) Belgrade | Zeleni | | | 15. eliminated Ep. 43 |
| Vukašin Stanić | Doctor of Kinesiology | 32 | (Serbia) Belgrade | | Zeleni | | 16. eliminated Ep. 44 |
| Goran Kaleb | caterer | 36 | (Croatia) Rogotin | | Žuti | | 17. eliminated Ep. 44 |
| Matija Novković | fitness trainer | 28 | (Serbia) Belgrade | Zeleni | | | 18. eliminated Ep. 45 |
| Marko Braić | actor | 33 | (Croatia) Pula/Zagreb | Žuti | | | 19. eliminated Ep. 45 |
| Lara Zavorović | SPA therapist | 20 | (Croatia) Split | Žuti | | | 20. eliminated Ep. 46 |
| Ksenija Bajić | fitness trainer | 26 | (Serbia) Sombor | | Zeleni | | 21. eliminated Ep. 46 |
| Luciano Plazibat | influencer, dancer | 26 | (Croatia) Solin/Zagreb | Žuti | | | Sole Survivor; Žutog plemena |
| Uroš Čiča | basketball player | 24 | (Serbia) Novi Sad | | Zeleni | | Sole Survivor; Zelenog plemena |

== Season summary ==
Episodes air five days a week. Two episodes are dedicated to the two challenge rounds for the prize, and the other three episodes are dedicated to immunity challenges, tribal councils, along with individual immunity challenges for the losing tribe. The last episode of each week is dedicated to the elimination battle that decides who will be eliminated.

Summary according to episodes posted on the Nova TV website:

Glavna igra (Days 1–50)
| No. | Air dates (2025) | Challenge winners | | | | | | Nominated | | | | Eliminated^{[F]} | Finish |
| No. | Air dates (2025) | Rewards^{[A]} | | Immunities | | | | Nominated | | | | Eliminated^{[F]} | Finish |
| No. | Air dates (2025) | Rewards^{[A]} | | Individual^{[B]} | | Tribal^{[C]} | | by tribe (voting) ^{[D]} | | by immunity holder^{[E]} | | Eliminated^{[F]} | Finish |
| No. | Air dates (2025) | #1 | #2 | #1 | #2 | #1 | #2 | #1 | #2 | #3 | #4 | Eliminated^{[F]} | Finish |
|---|---|---|---|---|---|---|---|---|---|---|---|---|---|
| 1 | 3. – 9. March | Žuti (1:0) | Žuti (7:2) | Marko | Anastasja | Zeleni (7:1) | Žuti (5:0) | Nika | Ivan T. | Niki | Aleksa | Jelena | Walked ^{[H]} |
| 1 | 3. – 9. March | Žuti (7:5) | Žuti (7:2) | Marko | Anastasja | Zeleni (7:1) | Žuti (5:0) | Nika | Ivan T. | Niki | Aleksa | Ivan T. | Walked ^{[G]} |
| 2 | 10. – 16. March | Zeleni (6:4) ^{[I]} | Zeleni (7:1) | Noa | Srđan | Zeleni (7:6) | Žuti (7:4) | Goran | Aleksa | Iva | Miloš | Aleksa | 1. eliminated Ep. 8 |
| 2 | 10. – 16. March | Žuti (4:2) | Zeleni (7:1) | Noa | Srđan | Zeleni (7:6) | Žuti (7:4) | Goran | Aleksa | Iva | Miloš | Aleksa | 1. eliminated Ep. 8 |
| 3 | 17. – 23. March | Zeleni (10:4) | Žuti (7:4) | Iva | Sandra | Zeleni (7:2) | Žuti (5:1) | Niki | Milanka | Liz | Katarina | Niki | 2. eliminated Ep. 12 |
| 4 | 24. - 30. March | Zeleni (6:5) | Žuti (6:4) | Iva | Katarina | Zeleni (7:1) | Zeleni (7:2) | Ivan | Ida | Nika | | Ida | 3. eliminated Ep. 16 |
| 5 | 31. March- 6. April | Zeleni (6:4) | Žuti (8:4) | Milanka | Luciano | Žuti (6:4) | Zeleni (7:4) | Ana | Nika | Anastasja | Matea | Anastasja | Walked ^{[H]} |
| 5 | 31. March- 6. April | Zeleni (6:4) | Žuti (8:4) | Milanka | Luciano | Žuti (6:4) | Zeleni (7:4) | Ana | Nika | Anastasja | Matea | Nika | 4. eliminated Ep. 20 |
| 6 | 7. - 13. April | Zeleni (7:2) | Žuti (7:4) | Liz | Vukašin | Zeleni (6:2) | Žuti (6:4) | Noa | Ana | Goran | Sandra | Noa | 5. eliminated Ep. 24 |
| 7 | 14. - 20. April | Zeleni (5:2) | Zeleni (6:5) | Katarina | Liz | Zeleni (6:3) | Žuti (6:3) | Matea | Miloš | Marko | Srđan | Matea | 6. eliminated Ep. 28 |
| 8 | 21. - 27. April | Zeleni (6:1) | Žuti (6:4) | Vukašin | Sandra^{[J]} | Žuti^{[K]} | | Ana | Srđan | Miloš | Nina | Ana | 7. eliminated Ep. 31 |
| 8 | 21. - 27. April | Žuti (6:5) | Zeleni (6:2) | Vukašin | Sandra^{[J]} | Žuti^{[K]} | | Ana | Srđan | Miloš | Nina | Srđan | 8. eliminated Ep. 32 |
| 9 | 28. April- 4. May | Zeleni (7:0) | Žuti (5:3) | Katarina | | Žuti^{[L]} | | Vukašin | | Sandra | | Sandra | 9. eliminated Ep. 34 |
| 9 | 28. April- 4. May | | | Milanka | Vukašin | Žuti (6:4) | Žuti (6:5) | Ksenija | Milanka | Miloš | Nina | Miloš | 10. eliminated Ep. 35 |
| 9 | 28. April- 4. May | | | Milanka | Vukašin | Žuti (6:4) | Žuti (6:5) | Ksenija | Milanka | Miloš | Nina | Milanka | 11. eliminated Ep. 36 |
| 10 | 5. - 11. May | Zeleni (6:3) | Žuti (8:6) | Katarina | Goran | Žuti (6:4) | Zeleni (6:4) | Nina | Marko | Ksenija | Liz | Nina | 12. eliminated Ep. 38 |
| 10 | 5. - 11. May | Zeleni (6:3) | Žuti (8:6) | Katarina | Goran | Žuti (6:4) | Zeleni (6:4) | Nina | Marko | Ksenija | Liz | Liz | 13. eliminated Ep. 40 |
| 11 | 12. and 13. May | | | Marko | | Zeleni (6:4) | Zeleni (8:6) | Luciano | Ivan P. | | | Iva | Walked ^{[M]} |
| 11 | 12. and 13. May | | | Marko | | Zeleni (6:4) | Zeleni (8:6) | Luciano | Ivan P. | | | Ivan P. | 14. eliminated Ep. 42 |
| 11 | 14. May | | | Goran | Uroš | | | Ksenija | | Katarina | | Katarina | 15. eliminated Ep. 43 |
| 11 | 15. and 16. May | | | Matija | Luciano | | | | | | | Vukašin | 16. eliminated Ep. 44 |
| 11 | 15. and 16. May | | | Matija | Luciano | | | | | | | Goran | 17. eliminated Ep. 44 |
| 12 | 20. and 21. May | | | Uroš | Lara | | | | | Matija | Ksenija | Matija | 18. eliminated Ep. 45 |
| 12 | 20. and 21. May | | | Uroš | Lara | | | | | Luciano | Marko | Marko | 19. eliminated Ep. 45 |
| 12 | 22. and 23. May | | | Luciano | Uroš | | | | | | | Lara | 20. eliminated Ep. 46 |
| 12 | 22. and 23. May | | | Luciano | Uroš | | | | | | | Ksenija | 21. eliminated Ep. 46 |

=== Notes ===
- ^A) The prize, or prizes, are earned in a single episode.
- ^B) Individual immunity is earned in a single episode and is valid for the entire week, and includes the power to nominate one contestant to the elimination game in the event that the immunity holder's tribe loses the Tribal Immunity Challenge.
- ^C) Tribal immunity is earned in a single episode and is valid only for the first subsequent Tribal Council.
- ^D) The person voted into the elimination game.
- ^E) The person chosen to go into the elimination game with the voted person.
- ^F) The contestant (or contestants) lost the elimination game and are leaving the show.
- ^G) The contestant has left the show. The elimination game was not held.
- ^H) A contestant has left the show due to injury/health condition.
- ^I) New contestants, who were staying on the secret island, join the game and participate in a special task. In it, Noa and Sandra won their tribes' first point and gained a secret power that allows them to block the vote of one of their tribe's contestants at tribal council - until the tribes merge.
- ^J) Vukašin and Sandra won the personal immunity necklace, but only Sandra has the power to nominate one contestant for the elimination game.
- ^K) All members of the Yellow Tribe enter the Unification (Merged Tribe), which is why none of them participate in either the Personal Immunity Game or the Elimination Game.
- ^L) During the united tribes party, the Green Tribe faced an emergency tribal council due to outnumbered members. On a tray in front of them was a piece of paper on which each member of the Green Tribe had to write their vote for nomination. The Yellows had dessert on their tray. The Greens also drew small pieces of paper, and only one of them said that this person had individual immunity (Katarina won it). The Greens voted for Vukašin, and Katarina nominated Sandra, who lost the elimination game and thus left the show.
- ^M) A contestant (Iva) is eliminated due to injury or health problems and becomes a member of the council. The injury is serious enough that the candidate cannot participate in the training grounds, but not severe enough to require treatment at home.

=== Polufinals and finale ===
Polufinal game
| Lap No. | Contestants | | | | | |
| Lap No. | Lara | Luciano | Marko | Ksenija | Matija | Uroš |
|---|---|---|---|---|---|---|
| 1 | + | | | | | |
| 2 | | | | + | | |
| 3 | + | | | | | |
| 4 | | | | | | + |
| 5 | | | + | | | |
| 6 | | | | | | + |
| 7 | + | | | | | |
| 8 | | | | | + | |
| 9 | | | + | | | |
| 10 | | | | | | + |
| 11 | | + | | | | |
| 12 | | | | | | + |
| 13 | | + | | | | |
| 14 | | | | + | | |
| 15 | + | | | | | |
| 16 | | | | | | + |
| 17 | | | + | | | |
| 18 | | | + | | | |
| 18 | + | | | | | |
| Results | 5 | 2 | 4 | 2 | 1 | 5 |
| Finalist | Da | Ne | Ne | Ne | Ne | Da |

Polufinal duel
| Duel No. | Contestants | | | |
| Duel No. | Luciano | Marko | Ksenija | Matija |
|---|---|---|---|---|
| 1 | | | + | |
| 2 | + | | | |
| Finalist | Yes | No | Yes | No |

1. final game
| Lap No. | Contestants | | | |
| Lap No. | Lara | Luciano | Ksenija | Uroš |
|---|---|---|---|---|
| 1 | + | | | |
| 2 | | | | + |
| 3 | | + | | |
| 4 | | | | + |
| 5 | | + | | |
| 6 | | | | + |
| 7 | | + | | |
| 8 | | | | + |
| 9 | | + | | |
| Results | 1 | 4 | 0 | 4 |
| Total points | 0 | 1 | 0 | 1 |

2. final game
| Lap No. | Contestants | | | |
| Lap No. | Lara | Luciano | Ksenija | Uroš |
|---|---|---|---|---|
| 1 | | | | + |
| 2 | | + | | |
| 3 | | | | + |
| 4 | + | | | |
| 5 | | | | + |
| 6 | | + | | |
| 7 | | | + | |
| 8 | | + | | |
| 9 | | | + | |
| 10 | | + | | |
| 11 | | | + | |
| 12 | | | | + |
| Results | 1 | 4 | 3 | 4 |
| Total points | 0 | 2 | 0 | 2 |

== Voting history ==
| | Original Tribe | | | New contestants | | | | | | | | | | | | | | | | | | | | | | | Merged tribes | | | | | | | | | | | | | | | | | | | | |
|---|---|---|---|---|---|---|---|---|---|---|---|---|---|---|---|---|---|---|---|---|---|---|---|---|---|---|---|---|---|---|---|---|---|---|---|---|---|---|---|---|---|---|---|---|---|---|---|
| Week # | 1 | | | 2 | | | 3 | | | 4 | | | | 5 | | | 6 | | | 7 | | | 8 | | | | 9 | | | | | | 10 | | | | 11 | | | | | | | | 12 | | |
| Episodes # | 1-4 | | | 5-8 | | | 9-12 | | | 13-16 | | | | 17-20 | | | 21-24 | | | 25-28 | | | 29-32 | | | | 33-34 | | 35 | | 36 | | 38 | | 40 | | 41 | | 42 | | 43 | | 44 | | 45 | | 46 |
| Tribal immunity | Zeleni | Žuti | | Zeleni | Žuti | | Zeleni | Žuti | | Zeleni | Zeleni | | | Žuti | Zeleni | | Zeleni | Žuti | | Zeleni | Žuti | | Žuti^{[E]} | | Žuti^{[E]} | | Žuti^{[G]} | | Žuti | | Žuti | | Žuti | | Zeleni | | Zeleni | | Zeleni | | | | | | | | |
| Nominated by the tribe | Nika | Ivan T. | | Goran | Aleksa | | Niki | Milanka | | Ivan P. | Ida | | | Ana^{[C]} | Nika | | Noa | Ana | | Matea | Miloš | | Ana | | Srđan | | Vukašin | | Ksenija | | Milanka | | Nina | | Marko | | Luciano | | Ivan P. | | Ksenija | | | | | | |
| Votes | 7-2 | 9-1 | | 5-2-1-1-1 | 9-3-1 | | 11-1 | 6-5-1 | | 6-5 | 5-5-1 | 5-4 | | 7-3-1 | 7-1-1-1 | | 8-1 | 6-5 | | 5-2-1 | 6-5 | | 8-3 | | 7-(2)-1 | | 4-3-2 | | 4-2-1-1 | | 4-2-1 | | 3-2-1 | | 5-1-1 | | 3-2 | | 3-2 | | 3-1-1 | | 5-2 | 5-1-1 | | | |
| Individual immunity ^{[A]} | Marko | Anastasja | | Noa | Srđan | | Iva | Sandra | | Iva | Katarina^{[B]} | | | Milanka | Luciano | | Liz | Vukašin | | Katarina | Liz | | Sandra^{[F]} | | Vukašin | | Katarina | | Milanka | | Vukašin | | Katarina | | Goran | | Marko | | Marko^{[H]} | | Uroš | | Matija | Luciano | Uroš | Lara | |
| Nominated by immunity holders | Niki | Aleksa | | Iva | Miloš | | Liz | Katarina | | Nika | | | | Anastasja | Matea | | Goran | Sandra | | Marko | Srđan | | Miloš | | Nina | | Sandra | | Miloš | | Nina | | Ksenija | | Liz | | | | | | Ksenija | | | | Matija; Ksenija | Luciano; Marko | |
| Eliminated in the challenge | | | none | | | Aleksa | | | Niki | | | | Ida | | | Nika | | | Noa | | | Matea | | Ana | | Srđan | | Sandra | | Miloš | | Milanka | | Nina | | Liz | | none^{[I]} | | Ivan P. | | Katarina | | | Matija | Marko | |
| Eliminated by the votes of the jury | | | | | | | | | | | | | | | | | | | | | | | | | | | | | | | | | | | | | | | | | | | Vukašin | Goran | | | |
| Uroš | Not in the game | | | | Ana | | | Anastasja | | | | | | Ana | | | | Ana | | | Miloš | | Ana | | Miloš | | Milanka | | Katarina | | Milanka | | Nina | | | | | | | | Katarina | | | | | | Sole Survivor |
| Luciano | Nika | | | Goran | | | Niki | | | Liz | Liz | Liz | | | Nika | | Noa | | | Matea | | | | | | | | | | | | | | | Marko | | Goran | | Goran | | | | | | | | Sole Survivor |
| Ksenija | Not in the game | | | | Aleksa | | | Miloš | | | | | | Ana | | | | Ana | | | Miloš | | Ana | | Srđan | | Vukašin | | Nina | | Matija | | Matija | | | | | | | | Matija | | | | | | Runner-up |
| Lara | Nika | | | Goran | | | Niki | | | Ivan P. | Ida | Ida | | | Nika | | Noa | | | Ivan P. | | | | | | | | | | | | | | | Iva | | Luciano | | Ivan P. | | | | | | | | Runner-up |
| Marko | Nika | | | Goran | | | Niki | | | Ivan P. | Ida | Ida | | | Noa | | Noa | | | Matea | | | | | | | | | | | | | | | Liz | | Luciano | | Ivan P. | | | | | | Eliminated | | |
| Matija | | Ivan T. | | | Ana | | | Milanka | | | | | | Sandra | | | | Srđan | | | Sandra | | Ana | | Srđan | | Sandra | | Ksenija | | Milanka | | Nina | | | | | | | | Ksenija | | | | Eliminated | | |
| Goran | Not in the game | | | Marko | | | Niki | | | Liz | Liz | Liz | | | Matea | | Noa | | | Matea | | | | | | | | | | | | | | | Marko | | Luciano | | Ivan P. | | | | | Eliminated | | | |
| Vukašin | Not in the game | | | | Ana | | | Milanka | | | | | | Ana | | | | Srđan | | | Sandra | | Nina | | Katarina | | Sandra | | Ksenija | | Milanka | | Vukašin | | | | | | | | Ksenija | | Eliminated | | | | |
| Katarina | | Ivan T. | | | Aleksa | | | Milanka | | | | | | Sandra | | | | Srđan | | | Sandra | | Ana | | Srđan | | Sandra | | Ksenija | | Milanka | | Nina | | | | | | | | Ksenija | Eliminated | Ksenija | Marko | | | |
| Ivan P. | Nika | | | Iva | | | Niki | | | Liz | Liz | Liz | | | Nika | | Noa | | | Matea | | | | | | | | | | | | | | | Marko | | Goran | | Goran | Eliminated | | | Vukašin | Goran | | | |
| Iva | Not in the game | | | Niki | | | Niki | | | Liz | Liz | Liz | | | Nika | | Noa | | | Matea | | | | | | | | | | | | | | | Marko | | Walked | | | | | | Vukašin | Goran | | | |
| Liz | Nika | | | Goran | | | Niki | | | Ivan P. | Ida | x | | | Nika | | Noa | | | Marko | | | | | | | | | | | | | | | Marko | Eliminated | | | | | | | Vukašin | Goran | | | |
| Nina | | Ivan T. | | | Aleksa | | | Miloš | | | | | | Ana | | | | Ana | | | Miloš | | Ana | | Srđan | | Vukašin | | Vukašin | | Katarina | | Vukašin | Eliminated | | | | | | | | | Vukašin | Goran | | | |
| Milanka | | Ivan T. | | | Aleksa | | | Miloš | | | | | | Ana | | | | Ana | | | Miloš | | Ana | | Srđan | | Vukašin | | Katarina | | Katarina | Eliminated | | | | | | | | | | | Vukašin | Goran | | | |
| Miloš | | Ivan T. | | | Aleksa | | | Milanka | | | | | | – ^{[D]} | | | | Srđan | | | Sandra | | Nina | | Srđan | | Milanka | | Ksenija | Eliminated | | | | | | | | | | | | | Ksenija | Lara | | | |
| Sandra | Not in the game | | | | Ana | | | Miloš | | | | | | Ana | | | | Ana | | | Miloš | | Ana | | Srđan | | Vukašin | Eliminated | | | | | | | | | | | | | | | | | | | |
| Srđan | | Ivan T. | | | Aleksa | | | Miloš | | | | | | Ana | | | | Ana | | | Miloš | | Ana | | Katarina | Eliminated | | | | | | | | | | | | | | | | | | | | | |
| Ana | | Ivan T. | | | Aleksa | | | Milanka | | | | | | Sandra | | | | Srđan | | | Sandra | | Nina | Eliminated | | | | | | | | | | | | | | | | | | | | | | | |
| Matea | Nika | | | Goran | | | Niki | | | Ivan P. | Marko | Ida | | | Nika | | Noa | | | Ivan P. | | Eliminated | | | | | | | | | | | | | | | | | | | | | | | | | |
| Noa | Not in the game | | | Nika | | | Niki | | | Ivan P. | Ida | Ida | | | Nika | | Matea | | Eliminated | | | | | | | | | | | | | | | | | | | | | | | | | | | | |
| Nika | Lara | | | Goran | | | Niki | | | Ivan P. | Ida | Ida | | | Iva | Eliminated | | | | | | | | | | | | | | | | | | | | | | | | | | | | | | | |
| Anastasja | | Ivan T. | | | Aleksa | | | Milanka | | | | | | Nina | | Walked | | | | | | | | | | | | | | | | | | | | | | | | | | | | | | | |
| Ida | Not in the game | | | Niki | | | Niki | | | Liz | Liz | x | Eliminated | | | | | | | | | | | | | | | | | | | | | | | | | | | | | | | | | | |
| Niki | Lara | | | Goran | | | Lucijano | | Eliminated | | | | | | | | | | | | | | | | | | | | | | | | | | | | | | | | | | | | | | |
| Aleksa | | Ivan T. | | | Milanka | Eliminated | | | | | | | | | | | | | | | | | | | | | | | | | | | | | | | | | | | | | | | | | |
| Marin | Nika | | | | | Walked | | | | | | | | | | | | | | | | | | | | | | | | | | | | | | | | | | | | | | | | | |
| Ivan T. | | Aleksa | Walked | | | | | | | | | | | | | | | | | | | | | | | | | | | | | | | | | | | | | | | | | | | | |
| Jelena | | | Walked | | | | | | | | | | | | | | | | | | | | | | | | | | | | | | | | | | | | | | | | | | | | |

=== Notes ===
- ^A) The individual immunity was won in a single aired episode and is valid for the entire week. It includes the power to nominate one contestant for the elimination game in case the immunity holder’s tribe loses the tribal immunity challenge.
- ^B) The contestant did not have the opportunity to use the power of individual immunity because their tribe won 2 tribal immunities this week.
- ^C) Due to the smaller number of male members in the green tribe, men are safe from nominations this week.
- ^D) A contestant’s vote was blocked due to a secret power.
- ^E) All members of the Yellow tribe enter the merge (Merged Tribe), and therefore none of them participate in the individual immunity game or the elimination game.
- ^F) Vukašin and Sandra won the individual immunity necklace, but only Sandra has the power to nominate one contestant for the elimination game.
- ^G) During the merged tribe's celebration, the Green tribe faced an extraordinary tribal council due to having more members. A tray in front of them held a paper where each Green tribe member had to write their vote for nomination. The Yellow tribe had dessert on their tray. Additionally, the Greens drew slips of paper, and only one had a note saying the person had Individual Immunity (won by Katarina). The Greens voted for Vukašin, and Katarina nominated Sandra, who lost the elimination game and therefore left the show.
- ^H) Marko’s individual immunity carried over from the previous episode.
- ^I) The contestant (Iva) was eliminated due to injury or health issues and became a member of the jury. The injury was serious enough to prevent participation in challenges, but not serious enough to require treatment at home.
