= Survivor: Dominican Republic =

- Season 5
- Presented by: Bojan Perić; Mario Mlinarić
- No. of days: 72
- No. of castaways: 25
- Winners: Stefan Nevistić; Nevena Blanuša
- Runners-up: Milica Dabović; Goran Špaleta
- Location: Dominican Republic
- No. of episodes: 69

Release
- Original network: Nova BH (Bosnia and Herzegovina); Nova TV (Croatia); Nova M (Montenegro); Nova S (Serbia)
- Original release: 14 March 2022 – June 5, 2022

Season chronology
- ← Previous; VIP: Costa Rica Next → 2023

Survivor: Dominican Republic (Serbo-Croatian: Survivor: Dominikanska Republika) is a joint Croatian and Serbian season of the international reality game show Survivor. It's the fifth season of the show's Serbian version and the third season of the Croatian version (counting the co-produced fourth season of the Serbian version). It premiered on 14 March 2022 on Nova BH in Bosnia and Herzegovina, Nova TV in Croatia, Nova M in Montenegro, and Nova S in Serbia.

In October 2021, United Media announced that they would be rebooting Survivor Srbija/Croatia after a 10-year hiatus. The season was filmed in the Dominican Republic.

== Contestants ==
The season originally consisted of 20 contestants, with 9 Croatians and 1 Bosnian on one tribe (Azua), and 8 Serbians and 2 Montenegrins on the other (Mao). 4 contestants were added later (2 Croats (Hrvoje Habdija, Nevena Blanuša) and 2 Serbs (Jovana Tomić, Ramiz Gusinac)). Ivana Peček entered the game later to replace Ivana Banfić, who was medically evacuated. Contestants were eliminated through duels. The participants of said duels were decided by nominations at Tribal Council, which would be held after Immunity Challenges two nights in a row every week. Notable contestants include the aforementioned Croatian singer Ivana Banfić, Montenegrin hip hop artist Niggor (who also competed on the Serbian version of The Farm), Serbian actress Mina Nikolić, Serbian basketball player Milica Dabović, and Serbian rugby player Stevan Stevanović. The cast also includes Big Brother Croatia alumna Sanja Močibob.

Contestant	Tribe		Finish
Sanja Močibob; 37, Umag, Croatia	Azua		1st eliminated Day 5
Igor Lazić "Niggor"; 52, Kotor, Montenegro	Mao		2nd eliminated Day 12
Ivana Banfić; 52, Velika Gorica, Croatia	Azua		Medically evacuated Day 13
Ivona Koković; 31, Prokuplje, Serbia	Mao		3rd eliminated Day 18
Kristian Rauch; 27, Zagreb, Croatia	Azua		4th eliminated Day 23
Hrvoje Habdija; 30, Zagreb, Croatia	Joined on day 14	Azua	5th eliminated Day 28
Ramiz Gusinac; 52, Novi Pazar, Serbia	Joined on day 14	Mao	6th eliminated Day 33
Viktor Bobić; 35, Jablanovec, Croatia	Azua		Medically evacuated Day 34
Јovana Tomić; 24, Belgrade, Serbia	Joined on day 14	Mao	7th eliminated Day 38
Ivana Peček; 24, Zagreb, Croatia	Joined on day 26	Azua	8th eliminated Day 43
Mina Nikolić; 29, Belgrade, Serbia	Mao		9th eliminated 1st jury member Day 49
Branko Milošev; 30, Novi Sad, Serbia	Mao		10th eliminated 2nd jury member Day 52
Roko Simić; 27, Split, Croatia	Azua		11th eliminated 3rd jury member Day 56
Sumejja Šejto; 27, Sarajevo, Bosnia and Herzegovina	Azua		12th eliminated 4th jury member Day 60
Vladimir Govedarica; 30, Belgrade, Serbia	Mao		13th eliminated 5th jury member Day 64
Maša Kuprešanin; 25, Novi Sad, Serbia	Mao		14th eliminated 6th jury member Day 67
Тomislav Rubinjoni; 32, Zagreb, Croatia	Azua		15th eliminated 7th jury member Day 69
Nika Rakić; 25, Kerestinec, Croatia	Azua		16th eliminated 8th jury member Day 70
Stevan Stevanović; 30, Belgrade, Serbia	Mao		17th eliminated 9th jury member Day 70
Nađa Erić; 21, Belgrade, Serbia	Mao		18th eliminated Day 71
Tena Tomljanović; 23, Zagreb, Croatia	Azua		19th eliminated Day 71
Goran Špaleta; 36, Zagreb, Croatia	Azua		Runners-up; Day 72
Milica Dabović; 40, Cetinje, Montenegro	Mao		Runners-up; Day 72
Nevena Blanuša; 27, Zagreb, Croatia	Joined on day 14	Azua	Dual Survivors; Day 72
Stefan Nevistić; 28, Kraljevo, Serbia	Mao		Dual Survivors; Day 72

== Season summary ==
20 castaways; 9 from Croatia, 1 from Bosnia & Herzegovina, 8 from Serbia and 2 from Montenegro, were split into two tribes, with the Croats and Bosnian on one, and the Serbs and Montenegrins on the other. Their names were originally "Blue tribe" and "Red tribe". At the first Tribal Council, they were named Azua and Mao respectively. The Mao tribe displayed more dominance than Azua in the challenges, and were in high spirits. The Azua tribe was less dominant and took the game much more seriously, even getting into altercations at camp. They also took different approaches at Tribal Council. While Mao was focused on nominating the weaker members, Azua was fine with nominating some of their strongest players if it meant they could win in a duel and come back to the tribe.

On day 12, the tribes were informed that, along with their 2 islands, there was a third island in play. The third island's contents were revealed on day 14 when four new castaways joined the game. Hrvoje Habdija and Nevena Blanuša joined Azua while Jovana Tomić and Ramiz Gusinac joined Mao. On day 24, Ivana Peček replaced Ivana Banfić, who was medically evacuated.

With 15 players still in the game, the tribes were invited to a merge party. However, this would not be a regular merge; both tribes would live together on a new beach, but they would still remain split, competing against each other in challenges and fending for themselves, in a similar vein to the One World twist from the American version. This is also when the jury phase began, with every following eliminated contestant becoming a juror. After Mina Nikolić became the first to join the jury, the game changed once again. After a Reward Challenge was held on day 50, the tribes naturally expected another Reward on day 51, but instead, it was an Immunity Challenge, and the tribe that lost would nominate two players; one would be nominated by the tribe, and the other would nominated by the winner of Individual Immunity. The first victim of this change was Branko Milošev, who became the second juror. This pattern continued, with another Reward the next round, followed by another Immunity Challenge where the same rules applied, resulting in Roko Simić becoming the third juror.

At the final 9, the castaways were informed that they were approaching the quarter-finals, but to decide who would be reaching them, a series of tribal duels would be held. Mao competed for a "strategic advantage", though they weren't told what the advantage would be. The advantage was won by Stefan Nevistić. Azua competed for Individual Immunity to ensure that the tribes would enter the quarter-finals even. Immunity was won by Goran Špaleta, who nominated Nevena Blanuša, while the tribe nominated Tomislav Rubinjoni. The latter was eliminated in the duel.

Throughout the game, Azua managed to reverse their fortune by defeating Mao in many challenges, but they weren't safe from dysfunction. An alliance was formed to protect their female members, but as the ethics were questioned, several tribe members were turned against each other. Along with this, they suffered another medical evacuation with Viktor Bobić. Meanwhile, at Mao, the drama primarily came from them trying to out-do Azua, often claiming their nominations were non-sensical and calling them poor sportsmen. Along with that, the "Big Five" alliance of Maša Kuprešanin, Milica Dabović, Stefan Nevistić, Stevan Stevanović, and Vladimir Govedarica struggled to take out their weak link Nađa Erić, as she won every duel she was sent into, despite her weakness in tribal challenges, wittling the alliance down to three. All three of them and Nađa made it to the final week, along with Azua's "golden boy" Goran Špaleta, newbie Nevena Blanuša, energetic and strong Nika Rakić, and original leader Tena Tomljanović.

At the semi-finals, Goran and Stefan won immunity and advanced to the final. Milica, Nađa, Nevena, and Tena had to plead their case to the jury, and the person from each tribe who got the most jury votes would advance to the final along with Goran and Stefan. Milica went through Tribal Council unscathed, but she was called out for her perceived manipulativeness; Nađa was criticized for her social unawareness and bad challenge performances; Nevena was called out for her scheming; and Tena was berated for her choice to nominate her friend Sumejja Šejto, which led to her losing in the duel to Nika, instead of voting against Nika, which would've landed all three of them in the duel. When the jury had to vote for a member of Mao to enter the final, Milica beat Nađa in a 7–2 vote. When the time came to vote for a member of Azua to advance to the final, Nevena unanimously beat Tena in a 9–0 vote.

Goran and Nevena were left as the Croatian Final Two, meaning one of them would get the title of Croatian Sole Survivor, while Milica and Stefan were left as the Serbian Final Two, meaning one would get the title of Serbian Sole Survivor. In the end, Stefan beat Milica for the title of Serbian Sole Survivor, while Nevena beat Goran for the title of Croatian Sole Survivor.

=== Challenge winners and eliminations by episode ===
Episodes air five days a week. Two episodes are dedicated to two Reward Chaellnges, and the other three episodes are dedicated to the Immunity Challenges, Tribal Councils, along with the Individual Immunity Challenges for the losing tribe. The last episode of each week is dedicated to the elimination duel that decides who gets eliminated. This format was changed starting with episode 47, when the patter was changed to Reward-Immunity-Reward-Immunity, and the last episode of each week was dedicated to Individual Immunity, Tribal Council and the duel. The final 5 episodes all aired from May 30 until June 5, with Friday being skipped.

Main game (Days 1–69)
Cycle		Challenge winners						Nominated		Eliminated	Finish
No.	Air dates (2022)	Rewards		Immunities				Nominated		Eliminated	Finish
No.	Air dates (2022)	#1	#2	Tribal		Individual		Nominated		Eliminated	Finish
No.	Air dates (2022)	#1	#2	#1	#2	#1	#2	#1	#2	Eliminated	Finish
1	14–18 March	Mao	Mao	Azua	Mao	Stefan	Viktor	Niggor, Ivona (Note: The vote ended in a deadlock tie, nominating both contestants)	Sanja	Sanja	1st eliminated Day 5
2	21–25 March	Mao	Azua	Mao	Azua	Kristian	Branko	Roko	Niggor	Niggor	2nd eliminated Day 12
3 (Note: Hrvoje Habdija, Jovana Tomić, Nevena Blanuša and Ramiz Gusinac join the game)	28 March–1 April	Azua	Mao	Azua	Azua	Ramiz (Note: Since the tribe lost both Immunity Challenges, the Individual Immunity winner got to keep it at both Tribal Councils)		Ivona	Jovana	Ivana B.	Medically evacuated Day 13
3	28 March–1 April	Azua	Mao	Azua	Azua	Ramiz		Ivona	Jovana	Ivona	3rd eliminated Day 18
4	4–8 April	Mao	Mao	Mao	Azua	Sumejja	Mina	Kristian	Nađa	Kristian	4th eliminated Day 23
5 (Note: Ivana Peček joins the game)	11–15 April	Mao	Azua	Mao	Azua	Nevena	Branko	Hrvoje	Nađa	Hrvoje	5th eliminated Day 28
6	18–22 April	Azua	Azua	Mao (Note: Mao also won the reward that went along with this challenge)	Azua	Tomislav	Maša	Goran	Ramiz	Ramiz	6th eliminated Day 33
7	25–29 April	Azua	Azua	Mao	Azua	Sumejja	Nađa	Ivana P.	Jovana	Viktor	Medically evacuated Day 34
7	25–29 April	Azua	Azua	Mao	Azua	Sumejja	Nađa	Ivana P.	Jovana	Jovana	7th eliminated Day 38
8	2–6 May	Azua	Azua	Mao	Mao	Nika		Ivana P.	Nevena	Ivana P.	8th eliminated Day 43
9 (Note: The tribes don't officially merge, but they do move to one camp and live together)	9–13 May	Azua	Azua	Azua	Mao	Vladimir	Nevena	Mina	Roko	Mina	9th eliminated 1st jury member Day 49
10	16–20 May	Azua	Mao	Azua	Mao	Stefan	Nika	Nađa	Branko	Branko	10th eliminated 2nd jury member Day 52
10	16–20 May	Azua	Mao	Azua	Mao	Stefan	Nika	Roko	Tomislav	Roko	11th eliminated 3rd jury member Day 56
11	23–27 May	Azua	Azua	Mao	Azua	Nevena	Nađa	Sumejja	Nika	Sumejja	12th eliminated 4th jury member Day 60
11	23–27 May	Azua	Azua	Mao	Azua	Nevena	Nađa	Vladimir	Stefan	Vladimir	13th eliminated 5th jury member Day 64
12	30 May–1 June	Azua (Note: Only one reward challenge was held this cycle)		Azua (Note: Only one immunity challenge was held this cycle)		Stefan	Stefan (Note: Also won an advantage in the next challenge)	Nađa	Maša	Maša	14th eliminated 6th jury member Day 67
12	30 May–1 June	Azua		Azua		Stefan	Goran	Tomislav	Nevena	Tomislav	15th eliminated 7th jury member Day 69
