= UEFA Euro 2020 broadcasting rights =

UEFA Euro 2020 was an international football tournament that took place in June and July 2021 involving 24 men's national teams from nations affiliated to the Union of European Football Associations (UEFA). The tournament was broadcast via television and radio all over the world.

== Television ==
=== UEFA ===
Territory	Rights holder(s)	Ref.
Albania	RTSH; SuperSport	
Andorra	Mediaset España; TF1; M6	
Armenia	Armenia TV	
Austria	ORF; oe24	
Azerbaijan	ITV; Idman Azerbaijan TV	
Belarus	Belteleradio	
Belgium	RTBF; VRT	
Bosnia and Herzegovina	Nova BH; Sport Klub	
Bulgaria	BNT; Nova	
Croatia	HRT; Sport Klub	
Cyprus	CyBC	
Czech Republic	ČT	
Denmark	DR; NENT	
Estonia	ERR	
Finland	Yle	
France	TF1; M6; beIN Sports	
Georgia	GPB	
Germany	ARD; ZDF; Deutsche Telekom	
Greece	ANT1; IPG	
Hungary	MTVA	
Iceland	365 Media	
Ireland	RTÉ	
Israel	Charlton	
Italy	RAI; Sky Italia	
Kazakhstan	Qazsport; Saran Media	
Kosovo	RTK; SuperSport	
Latvia	MTG	
Lithuania	LNK	
Malta	PBS	
Moldova	GMG	
Montenegro	Nova M; Sport Klub	
Netherlands	NOS	
North Macedonia	MRT; Sport Klub	
Norway	NRK; TV 2	
Poland	TVP	
Portugal	RTP; SIC; TVI; Sport TV	
Romania	Pro TV	
Russia	VGTRK; Perviy Kanal; Match TV	
San Marino	RAI; Sky Italia	
Serbia	Nova S; Sport Klub	
Slovakia	RTVS	
Slovenia	Sport Klub; Šport TV	
Spain	Mediaset España	
Sweden	SVT; TV4	
Switzerland	SRG SSR	
Turkey	TRT	
Ukraine	Ukrayina	
United Kingdom	BBC; ITV; S4C	

=== Rest of world ===
Territory	Rights holder(s)	Ref.
Afghanistan	1TV	
Argentina	TNT Sports	
Australia	Optus Sport	
Benin	Canal 3	
Bolivia	Bolivisión; Tigo Sports	
Brazil	Canais Globo	
Brunei	Kristal-Astro	
Burkina Faso	BF1 TV	
Cambodia	CBS	
Cameroon	Canal 2	
Canada	CTV; TSN; TVA Sports	
Cape Verde	RTC	
Caribbean	ESPN	
Central African Republic	TVCA	
Central America	SKY	
Chile	TNT Sports	
China	CCTV; IQIYI; Migu; Shankai Sports	
Colombia	Win Sports+	
Comoros	ORTC	
Costa Rica	Teletica; Repretel	
Cuba	ICRT	
El Salvador	TCS	
Eswatini	Eswatini TV	
Fiji	FBC	
Gabon	RTG	
Gambia	GRTS	
Ghana	Multimedia Group	
Guatemala	Chapín TV	
Guinea	RTG	
Guinea-Bissau	TGB	
Haiti	TNH	
Honduras	TVC	
Hong Kong	PCCW Media	
Indian subcontinent	Sony Pictures Networks	
Indonesia	IMG; MNC; Mola TV	
Inflight	Sport 24	
Ivory Coast	Life TV	
Japan	Wowow	
Kenya	KTN	
Kyrgyzstan	KTRK; Q Sport; Saran Media	
Liberia	LBS	
Macau	TDM	
Madagascar	ORTM	
Malawi	MBC	
Malaysia	Astro; RTM	
Maldives	Raajje TV	
Mali	ORTM	
Mauritius	MBC	
MENA	beIN Sports	
Mexico	SKY; Televisa	
Mongolia	Central TV; Unitel	
Mozambique	TVM	
Myanmar	Sky Net	
Namibia	NBC	
Nepal	DishHome	
New Zealand	SKY	
Niger	ORTN	
Nigeria	Moreplex TV; ONTV; Silverbird	
Pacific Ocean	Digicel	
Paraguay	Tigo Sports	
Peru	América Televisión	
Philippines	LIVENow	
Rwanda	RBA	
São Tomé and Príncipe	TVS	
Senegal	Groupe Futurs Médias	
Seychelles	SBC	
Singapore	LIVENow	
South Africa	SuperSport	
South Korea	CJ ENM	
South America	DirecTV	
Sub-Saharan Africa	Canal+; SuperSport; StarTimes; TVMS	
Taiwan	Eleven Sports	
Tajikistan	Saran; TV Varzish	
Tanzania	Azam TV	
Thailand	Channel 3; NBT; PPTV; TrueVisions	
Timor-Leste	ETO	
Togo	TVT	
Turkmenistan	Saran	
United States	ABC; ESPN; Univision	
Uzbekistan	Uzreport TV	
Venezuela	IVC Networks	
Vietnam	VTV	
Zimbabwe	ZBC	

== Radio ==
=== UEFA ===
Territory	Rights holder(s)	Ref.
Belgium	VRT	
Germany	ARD	
Italy	RTL 102.5	
Spain	Cadena COPE; Onda Cero; Radio Marca	
Sweden	Sveriges Radio	
United Kingdom	BBC; Talksport	

=== Rest of world ===
Territory	Rights holder(s)	Ref.
Indonesia	MNC	
United States	Uforia Audio Network	
