= Survivor Srbija =

- Created by: Charlie Parsons
- Presented by: Andrija Milošević (Seasons 1–4); Marijana Batinić (Season 4); Bojan Perić (Season 5 - 7)
- Country of origin: Serbia
- Original language: Serbian
- No. of seasons: 7
- No. of episodes: 196

Original release
- Network: Prva Srpska Televizija (2008–2012); Nova S (2022–)
- Release: October 27, 2008 – present

Survivor Srbija is the Serbian version of the reality television game show Survivor. Its first broadcast was on October 27, 2008. The show was broadcast by Prva until 2022 where it got rebooted by United Media, being broadcast by Nova S.

In addition to Serbia, the show is broadcast in Croatia (on Nova TV, Bosnia and Herzegovina (on Nova BH, Macedonia, Slovenia and Montenegro (on Nova M. The fifth season has the subtitle Na putu do pob(j)ede (On the road to victory).

== Broadcast ==
Country	TV Channel
Bosnia and Herzegovina	Alternativna TV (1st and 2nd season); NTV Hayat (2nd season); OBN (3rd and 4th seasons); Nova BH (5th season)
Croatia	RTL Televizija (4th season); Nova TV (5th season)
Montenegro	TV In (1st and 3rd seasons); PRO TV (2nd and 4th seasons); Nova M (5th season)
North Macedonia	A1 Televizija (1st season); Sitel Televizija (2nd, 3rd and 4th seasons)
Slovenia	TV3 Slovenia (2nd season)

== Seasons ==
So far four seasons have been filmed and broadcast, with a fifth (pan-regional) season currently airing.

The show has a set number of contestants stranded on an isolated area for 53 days in the first two seasons and 32 and 37 days in the third and the fourth seasons.

The winners received a prize of €100,000. In VIP season, the winner received a prize of €50,000.

Andrija Milošević was an only host from seasons 1 to 3, when Marijana Batinić joined him to host season 4 together. In February 2022, it was announced that Bojan Perić would host season 5.

=== Seasons overview ===
Season		Winner(s)	Runner Up(s)	2nd Runner-Up	3rd Runner-Up	Vote	Contestants	No. of days	Tribes	Location	Year
1	Survivor Srbija: Panama	Nemanja; Pavlov	Radoslav; Vidojević	Edita; Janečka	—N/a	6-3-0	22	53	Armada; Roca; Perla	Pearl Islands, Panama	2008–2009
2	Survivor Srbija: Philippines	Aleksandar; Krajišnik	Teja; Lapanja	Vesna; Đolović	—N/a	6-3-1	22	53	Manobo; Ga 'dang Diwata	Caramoan, Philippines	2009–2010
3 (VIP)	Survivor Srbija VIP: Philippines	Andrej; Maričić	Toni "Zen"; Petkovski	Katarina; Vučetić	Goca; Tržan	8-4-2	16	32	Bahandi; Kasuko; Putong	Caramoan, Philippines	2010–2011
4 (VIP)	Survivor Srbija VIP: Costa Rica	Vladimir "Vlada" Vuksanović	Milan; Gromilić	Nikola; Šoć	Sebastijan; Flajs	6-5-2-0	18	37	Matambo; Boruka; Sibu	Corcovado, Costa Rica	2012
5	Survivor: Dominican Republic	Stefan Nevistić; Nevena Blanusa	Milica Dabović; Goran Špaleta	—N/a			25	72	Mao; Azua	Dominican Republic	2022
6	Survivor: Dominican Republic	Nataša Kondić; Antonia Ivić	Anja Andrejić; Denis Svila	—N/a			25	72	Mao; Azua	Dominican Republic	2023

== Contestants ==
Name	Age	Hometown	Season	Finish	Profession	Day of Elimination
Miodrag Jovanović	55	Belgrade	Survivor Srbija: Panama	22nd		
Slobodanka Tošić	22	Han Pijesak, Bosna i Hercegovina	Survivor Srbija: Panama	21st		
Bojana Lukić-Jovković	41	Belgrade	Survivor Srbija: Panama	20th		
Tamara Jovičić	33	Čačak	Survivor Srbija: Panama	19th		
Miloš Todorović	46	Lazarevac	Survivor Srbija: Panama	18th		
Saša Ljuboja	34	Belgrade	Survivor Srbija: Panama	17th		
Ognjen Janevski	24	Valjevo	Survivor Srbija: Panama	16th		
Marija Grubač	25	Herceg Novi, Montenegro	Survivor Srbija: Panama	15th		
Petar Obradović	32	Belgrade	Survivor Srbija: Panama	14th		
Tatjana Vesnić	20	Belgrade	Survivor Srbija: Panama	13th		
Vanja Jelača	25	Novi Sad	Survivor Srbija: pobednik	12th		
Dario Ćirić	31	Belgrade	Survivor Srbija: Panama	11th		
Nemanja Rosić	20	Belgrade	Survivor Srbija: Panama	10th		
Vanja Mandić	29	Novi Sad	Survivor Srbija: Panama	9th		
Maja Lazarević	26	Belgrade	Survivor Srbija: Panama	8th		
Miloš Bugarčić	32	Belgrade	Survivor Srbija: Panama	7th		
Vanja Radović	32	Zemun	Survivor Srbija: Panama	6th		
Duško Nožinić	29	Sisak/Jagodina	Survivor Srbija: Panama	5th		
Hana Stamatović	26	Belgrade	Survivor Srbija: Panama	4th		
Edita Janečka	27	Zrenjanin	Survivor Srbija: Panama	2nd Runner-Up		
Radoslav Vidojević	31	Pale/Belgrade	Survivor Srbija: Panama	Runner-Up		
Nemanja Pavlov	29	Valjevo/Novi Sad	Survivor Srbija: Panama	Winner		
Branka Čudanov	28	Kikinda	Survivor Srbija: Philippines	22nd		
Gordana Berger	38	Belgrade	Survivor Srbija: Philippines	21st		
Ana Mitrić	23	Belgrade	Survivor Srbija: Philippines	20th		
Milena Vitanović	21	Paraćin	Survivor Srbija: Philippines	19th		
Branislava Bogdanović	27	Kačarevo	Survivor Srbija: Philippines	18th		
Pece Kotevski	42	Bitola, Macedonia	Survivor Srbija: Philippines	17th		
Predrag Veljković	29	Pekčanica, near Kraljevo	Survivor Srbija: Philippines	16th		
Anita Mažar	23	Kula	Survivor Srbija: Philippines	15th		
Aleksandar Bošković	28	Belgrade	Survivor Srbija: Philippines	14th		
Ana Stojanovska	21	Skopje, Macedonia	Survivor Srbija: Philippines	13th		
Luka Rajačić	21	Belgrade	Survivor Srbija: Philippines	12th		
Nemanja Vučetić	23	Novi Sad	Survivor Srbija: Philippines	11th		
Nikola Kovačević	24	Kragujevac	Survivor Srbija: Philippines	10th		
Dina Berić	23	Ledinci, near Novi Sad	Survivor Srbija: Philippines	9th		
Višnja Banković	24	Aranđelovac	Survivor Srbija: Philippines	8th		
Klemen Rutar	21	Ljubljana, Slovenija	Survivor Srbija: Philippines	7th		
Srđan Dinčić	25	Sremska Mitrovica	Survivor Srbija: Philippines	6th		
Njegoš Arnautović	21	Bijeljina, Bosnia and Herzegovina	Survivor Srbija: Philippines	5th		
Dušan Milisavljević	25	Zvečan	Survivor Srbija: Philippines	4th		
Vesna Đolović	38	Belgrade	Survivor Srbija: Philippines	2nd Runner-Up		
Teja Lapanja	30	Škofja Loka, Slovenija	Survivor Srbija: Philippines	Runner-Up		
Aleksandar Krajišnik	19	Majur, near Šabac	Survivor Srbija: Philippines	Winner		
Nikolija Jovanović	21	Athens, Greece	Survivor Srbija VIP: Philippines	16th		
Vesna Zmijanac	53	Bukulja	Survivor Srbija VIP: Philippines	15th		
Biljana Cincarević	35	Belgrade	Survivor Srbija VIP: Philippines	14th		
Milan Rus	33	Belgrade	Survivor Srbija VIP: Philippines	13th		
Nenad "Knez" Knežević	43	Belgrade	Survivor Srbija VIP: Philippines	12th		
Miloš Vlalukin	30	Belgrade	Survivor Srbija VIP: Philippines	11th		
Edin Škorić	35	Belgrade	Survivor Srbija VIP: Philippines	10th		
Nikola Rokvić	25	Belgrade	Survivor Srbija VIP: Philippines	9th		
Aleksandra Perović	32	Belgrade	Survivor Srbija VIP: Philippines	8th		
Bojana Barović	27	Los Angeles, United States	Survivor Srbija VIP: Philippines	7th		
Jelena Mrkić	27	Novi Sad	Survivor Srbija VIP: Philippines	6th		
Marko Bulat	37	Belgrade	Survivor Srbija VIP: Philippines	5th		
Gordana "Goca" Tržan	36	Belgrade	Survivor Srbija VIP: Philippines	4th		
Katarina Vučetić	27	Belgrade	Survivor Srbija VIP: Philippines	2nd Runner-Up		
Toni "Zen" Petkovski	27	Skopje, Macedonia	Survivor Srbija VIP: Philippines	Runner-Up		
Andrej Maričić	30	Belgrade	Survivor Srbija VIP: Philippines	Winner		
Aleksandra Nakova	23	Gevgelija, Macedonia	Survivor VIP: Costa Rica	Disqualified		
Stanija Dobrojević	27	Ruma	Survivor VIP: Costa Rica	Disqualified		
Mia Begović	49	Zagreb, Croatia	Survivor VIP: Costa Rica	16th		
Jelena Maćić	44	Belgrade	Survivor VIP: Costa Rica	15th		
Radovan Stošić	28	Zagreb, Croatia	Survivor VIP: Costa Rica	14th		
Žarko "Žare" Berber	43	Skopje, Macedonia	Survivor VIP: Costa Rica	13th		
Neven Ciganović	42	Zagreb, Croatia	Survivor VIP: Costa Rica	12th		
Marko Karadžić	36	Belgrade	Survivor VIP: Costa Rica	11th		
Ognjen Kajganić	36	Belgrade	Survivor VIP: Costa Rica	10th		
Maja Lena Lopatni	21	Zagreb, Croatia	Survivor VIP: Costa Rica	9th		
Aleksandra "Aleks" Grdić	33	Virovitica, Croatia	Survivor VIP: Costa Rica	8th		
Ava Karabatić	24	Split, Croatia	Survivor VIP: Costa Rica	7th		
Martina Vrbos	28	Zagreb, Croatia	Survivor VIP: Costa Rica	6th		
Kristina Bekvalac	27	Novi Sad	Survivor VIP: Costa Rica	5th		
Sebastijan Flajs	29	Samobor, Croatia	Survivor VIP: Costa Rica	3rd Runner-Up		
Nikola Šoć	26	Cetinje, Montenegro	Survivor VIP: Costa Rica	2nd Runner-Up		
Milan Gromilić	33	Belgrade	Survivor VIP: Costa Rica	Runner-Up		
Vladimir "Vlada" Vuksanović	24	Belgrade	Survivor VIP: Costa Rica	Winner		
Sanja Močibob	37	Umag, Croatia	Survivor Dominican Republic	25th	Marketing student	Eliminated on 5th day
Igor Lazić "Niggor"	51	Kotor, Montenegro	Survivor Dominican Republic	24th	hip hop artist	Eliminated on 12th day
Ivana Banfić	52	Zagreb, Croatia	Survivor Dominican Republic	23rd	Singer	Left the Survivor on 13th day
Ivona Koković	31	Prokuplje	Survivor Dominican Republic	22nd	Life Coach	Eliminated on 18th day
Kristian Rauš	27	Zagreb, Croatia	Survivor Dominican Republic	21st	Personal Coach	Eliminated on 23rd day
Hrvoje Habdija	30	Zagreb, Croatia	Survivor Dominican Republic	20th	Skipper	Eliminated on 28th day
Ramiz Gusinac	52	Novi Pazar	Survivor Dominican Republic	19th	Barber	Eliminated on 33rd day
Viktor Bobić	35	Jablanovec, Croatia	Survivor Dominican Republic	18th	Owner of Gym	Left on 34th day because of injury
Jovana Tomić	24	Belgrade	Survivor Dominican Republic	17th	Molecular Biologist	Eliminated on 39th day
