= Survivor: Odisejev Otok =

- Season 1
- Presented by: Kristijan Potočki
- No. of days: 45
- No. of castaways: 20
- Winner: Vazmenko Pervan
- Runner-up: Vedran Rubrik Šehić
- Location: Mljet, Croatia

Release
- Original network: HRT 2
- Original release: May 12 – July 7, 2005

Season chronology
- Next → Survivor: Kostarika

Survivor: Odisejev Otok is the first season of the Croatian version of the Swedish show Expedition Robinson, or Survivor and it aired 2005. Having been influenced by the success of the Croatian version of Big Brother, channel HRT decided to launch a Croatian version of Survivor which aired from May 12, 2005 to July 7, 2005. An immediate twist this season was that each tribe was forced to take part in an elimination challenge on day one of the competition. As Ivan Krželj of the "Ammos" tribe (named after the Greek word for sand) and Ana Marija Bojko of the "Petros" tribe (named after the Greek word for rock) lost the challenge they were both eliminated from the competition. Throughout the rest of the pre-merge portion of the competition the tribes battled for a majority when the merge arrived. As many of them were considered weak by their tribes, most of the women were eliminated during this portion of the competition. When the merge arrived, the two tribes became one known as "Zoi" and the former original members of Ammos found themselves out numbered six to four. Due to this, all of the former members of Ammos, with the exception of Silvija Zelko, were almost immediately eliminated. When it came time for the final four, the contestants competed in two challenges in order to determine the final two. As the winner of the first challenge, Vazmenko Pervanu chose to eliminate the only non-former Petros member Silvija Zelko. Kristina Sesar, Vazmenko Pervanu, and Vedran Rubrik Šehić were then forced to compete in a second challenge which Vedran Rubrik Šehić won and chose to eliminate Kristina Sesar, who many considered to be the villain of the season. Unlike most versions of Survivor, the public, not the jury, chose the winner and despite the fact that Vedran Rubrik Šehić won the jury vote by a margin of 4-3, it was Vazmenko Pervanu who won this season with a public vote of 68.23% to Vedran Rubrik Šehić's 31.77%. Due to low ratings Survivor was cancelled following this season.

The Croatian version of Survivor received a second season in the form of the 4th season of Survivor Srbija, and a new season is set to be released in 2022.

== Finishing order ==
Contestant	Original Tribes	Tribal Swap	Merged Tribe	Finish
Ivan Krželj; Split	Ammos			Eliminated in a Twist; Day 1
Ana Marija Bojko; Zagreb	Petros			Eliminated in a Twist; Day 1
Lidija Šunjerga; 37, Split	Ammos			1st Voted Out; Day 3
Mirjana Frantal Jadreško; 38, Pula	Petros			2nd Voted Out; Day 6
Iva Jerković; 23, Zagreb	Ammos			Evacuated; Day 8
Šaneta Grbavac; 34, Zagreb	Ammos	Petros		3rd Voted Out; Day 12
Sasha Pintar; 31, Stuttgart, Germany	Petros	Ammos		4th Voted Out; Day 15
Dvina Meler; 28, Zagreb	Petros	Ammos		5th Voted Out; Day 18
Tea Đurek; 31, Zagreb	Petros	Petros		6th Voted Out; Day 21
Mladen Glavić; 29, Zagreb	Ammos	Ammos		7th Voted Out; Day 24
Vladimir Bambić; 45, Zagreb	Ammos	Ammos	Zoi	8th Voted Out; 1st Jury Member; Day 27
Mihajlo Popović; 26, Zagreb	Ammos	Petros	Zoi	9th Voted Out; 2nd Jury Member; Day 30
Filip Filipović; 25, Zagreb	Ammos	Ammos	Zoi	10th Voted Out; 3rd Jury Member; Day 33
Ivica Jurinić; 48, Zagreb	Petros	Petros	Zoi	11th Voted Out; 4th Jury Member; Day 36
Tanja Troskot; 35, Zadar	Ammos	Ammos	Zoi	12th Voted Out; 5th Jury Member; Day 39
Mladen Kezele; 41, Mali Lošinj	Petros	Petros	Zoi	13th Voted Out; 6th Jury Member; Day 42
Silvija Zelko; Zagreb	Ammos	Ammos	Zoi	14th Voted Out; 7th Jury Member; Day 43
Kristina Sesar; 25, Zagreb	Petros	Petros	Zoi	15th Voted Out; 8th Jury Member; Day 44
Vedran Rubrik Šehić; 24, Samobor	Petros	Petros	Zoi	Runner-Up; Day 45
Vazmenko Pervan; Zagreb	Petros	Petros	Zoi	Sole Survivor; Day 45

== The game ==
Cycles	Challenges		Eliminated	Vote	Finish
Cycles	Reward	Immunity	Eliminated	Vote	Finish
1	None	Petros	Ivan	No Vote	Eliminated in a Twist^{1} Day 1
1	None	Petros	Ana Marija	No Vote	Eliminated in a Twist^{1} Day 1
1	None	Petros	Lidija	6-?	1st Voted Out; Day 3
2	Petros	Ammos	Mirjana	8-1	2nd Voted Out; Day 6
3	?	None^{2}	Iva	No Vote	Evacuated; Day 8
4	?	Ammos	Šaneta	7-1	3rd Voted Out; Day 12
5	Petros	Petros	Sasha	6-1	4th Voted Out; Day 15
6	?	Petros	Dvina	?	5th Voted Out; Day 18
7	Ammos	Ammos	Tea	3-?	6th Voted Out; Day 21
8	Ammos	Petros	Mladen G.	4-1	7th Voted Out; Day 24
9	None^{3}	Vazmenko	Vladimir	6-4	8th Voted Out; 1st Jury Member; Day 27
10	Ivica [Filip]	Filip	Mihajlo	5-3-1	9th Voted Out; 2nd Jury Member; Day 30
11	Silvija [Filip]	Mladen K.	Filip	5-?	10th Voted Out; 3rd Jury Member; Day 33
12	Vazmenko	Vazmenko	Ivica	4-?	11th Voted Out; 4th Jury Member; Day 36
13	Kristina	Kristina	Tanja	3-?	12th Voted Out; 5th Jury Member; Day 39
14	?	Silvija	Mladen K.	?	13th Voted Out; 6th Jury Member; Day 42
15	None	Vazmenko	Silvija	1-0	14th Voted Out; 7th Jury Member; Day 43
15	None	Vedran	Kristina	1-0	15th Voted Out; 8th Jury Member; Day 44
Final	Public vote		Vedran	68% - 32%	Runner-up
Final	Public vote		Vazmenko	68% - 32%	Sole Survivor

In the case of multiple tribes or castaways who win reward or immunity, they are listed in order of finish, or alphabetically where it was a team effort; where one castaway won and invited others, the invitees are in brackets.

^1 All contestants from both tribes had to pull one name out of the hat. Two contestants with the highest number of "votes" (one from each tribe) were automatically eliminated, but were left as a backup in case someone quits.

^2 There was no immunity challenge in this cycle due to Iva's removal from the game. Subsequently, there was no Tribal Council either.

^3 There was no Reward Challenge due to tribal merge.

== Voting history ==
	Original Tribes					Swapped Tribes					Merged Tribe							
Cycle #:	1			2	3	4	5	6	7	8	9	10	11	12	13	14	15	
Eliminated:	Ivan; No vote^{1}	Ana Marija; No vote^{1}	Lidija; 6/9 votes	Mirjana; 8/9 votes	Iva; No vote^{4}	Šaneta; 7/8 votes	Sasha; 6/7 votes	Dvina ?/6 votes	Tea; 3/7 votes	Mladen G. 4/5 votes	Vladimir; 6/10 votes	Mihajlo; 5/9 votes	Filip; 5/8 votes	Ivica; 4/7 votes	Tanja; 3/6 votes	Mladen K. ?/5 votes	Silvija; 1 vote	Kristina; 1 vote
Voter	Vote																	
Vazmenko				Mirjana		Šaneta			?		Vladimir	Mihajlo	Filip	Ivica	?	Mladen K.	Silvija	
Vedran				Mirjana		Šaneta			?		Vladimir	Mihajlo	Filip	Ivica	?	Mladen K.		Kristina
Kristina				Mirjana		Šaneta			?		Vladimir	Mihajlo	Filip	Ivica	?	Mladen K.		
Silvija			?				Sasha	?		Mladen G.	Kristina	Mladen K.	?	?	?	?		
Mladen K.				Mirjana		Šaneta			Kristina		Vladimir	Mihajlo	Filip	Tanja	Tanja	?		
Tanja			?				Sasha	?		Mladen G.	Kristina	Mladen K.	?	?	?			
Ivica				Mirjana		Šaneta			?		Vladimir	Mihajlo	Filip	Tanja				
Filip			?				Sasha	?		Mladen G.	Kristina	Mladen K.	?					
Mihajlo			?			Šaneta			Vazmenko		Vladimir	?						
Vladimir			?				Sasha	?		Mladen G.	Kristina							
Mladen G.			?				Sasha	?		?								
Tea				Mirjana		Šaneta			Mihajlo									
Dvina				Mirjana			Sasha	?										
Sasha				Mirjana			?											
Šaneta			?			?												
Iva			?															
Mirjana				Kristina														
Lidija			?															
Ana Marija																		
Ivan																		

^4 Iva was evacuated for medical reasons.
