= Doma TV =

Croatian TV channel

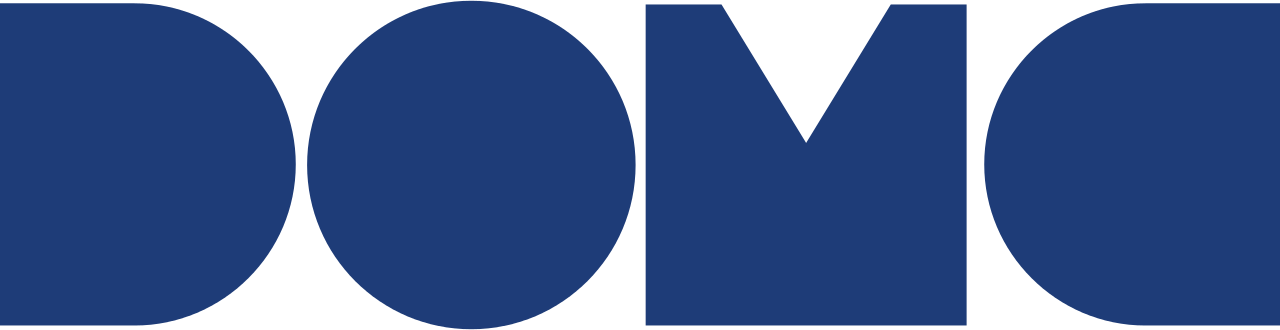
- Country: Croatia
- Headquarters: Zagreb, Croatia

Programming
- Picture format: 720p HDTV

Ownership
- Owner: Alpac Capital
- Sister channels: Nova TV; Mini TV; N1 Hrvatska; Nova Max; Nova Series; Nova Sport

History
- Launched: January 2, 2011

Links
- Website: http://www.domatv.hr/

Doma TV is a Croatian specialized television channel.

== Programming aired by Doma TV ==
=== Telenovelas ===
==== Ended ====
- Acorralada
- Alborada
- Amar sin límites
- Amor real
- Amores Verdaderos
- Anna und die Liebe (canceled after 254 episodes)
- Apuesta por un amor
- Balika Vadhu
- Camaleones
- Corazón Indomable
- Cuidado con el ángel
- Doña Bárbara
- El Fantasma de Elena
- En nombre del amor
- Esmeralda
- Eva Luna
- Heridas de amor
- Îngerașii
- Gipsy Heart
- Iubire și onoare
- Juro que te amo
- La gata
- La Reina del Sur
- La tempestad
- La usurpadora
- La que no podía amar
- Las bandidas
- Laberintos de pasión
- Lo que la vida me robó
- Madre Luna
- Mañana es para siempre
- Mariana de la noche
- Marisol
- Medcezir (canceled after s1)
- Pod sretnom zvijezdom
- Porque el amor manda
- Por tu amor
- ¿Quién eres tú?
- Rebelde
- Rubí
- Rosalinda
- Rosario Tijeras, amar es más difícil que matar
- Salomé
- Sortilegio
- Teresa
- Tormenta en el paraiso
- Triunfo del Amor
- Udaan (canceled after 100 episodes due to low ratings)
- Valeria
- Zakon Ljubavi

=== Series & miniseries ===
==== Airing currently ====
- Blue Bloods (season 1-13 aired)
- NCIS (seasons 1-20 aired)
- NCIS: Los Angeles (all seasons)
- NCIS: New Orleans (rerun of all seasons)
- Perception (rerun of all seasons)
- Solo per amore (all seasons)
- The Following (season 3 airing)
- S.W.A.T. (season 1-6)

==== Hiatus ====
- 2 Broke Girls (seasons 1-4 aired)
- Arrow (season 1-3 aired)
- Blindspot (season 1 aired)
- Body of Proof (seasons 1-2 aired)
- Community (seasons 1-5 aired)
- Days of Our Lives (260 episodes aired)
- Hart of Dixie (seasons 1-3 aired)
- Justified (seasons 1-5 aired)
- Longmire (seasons 1-3 aired)
- Major Crimes (seasons 1-3 aired)
- Masha and the Bear (52 episodes aired)
- Masters of Sex (seasons 1-3 aired)
- Mike & Molly (season 1-4 aired)
- Mom (seasons 1-2 aired)
- NCIS: New Orleans (seasons 1-2 aired)
- Pretty Little Liars (seasons 1-5 aired)
- Rizzoli & Isles (season 1-5 aired)
- Scorpion (seasons 1-2 aired)
- The Last Ship (season 1 aired)
- Shameless (seasons 1-3 aired)
- The Vampire Diaries (seasons 1-4 aired)
- Unforgettable (seasons 1-3 aired)

==== Ended ====
- 24
- 30 Rock
- 666 Park Avenue
- Almost Human
- Amiche mie
- Annem
- Asi
- Aşk-ı Memnu
- Aşk ve Ceza
- Better with You
- Bolji život
- Breaking Bad
- Breaking In
- Castle
- Caterina e le sue figlie
- Cimmer fraj
- Chase
- Christopher Columbus
- CSI: Cyber
- Crusoe
- Cult
- Dallas
- Dawson's Creek
- Drop Dead Diva
- Eastwick
- Elveda Derken
- Fatmagül'ün Suçu Ne?
- Flash Gordon
- Forever
- Franklin & Bash
- Friends
- Full House
- Gilmore Girls
- Glory Daze
- Golden Boy
- Ground Floor
- Gümüş
- Hank
- Hanımın Çiftliği
- Hawthorne
- Hellcats
- Hispania, la leyenda
- Hitna 94
- Hostages
- Human Target
- I Hate My Teenage Daughter
- Inspector Rex
- Jamie at Home
- Jamie's Ministry of Food
- Jamie's 30 Minutes Meals
- Kaybolan Yillar
- Krypto the Superdog
- La Femme Nikita
- Lie to Me
- The Looney Tunes Show
- Mad Love
- Made in Jersey
- Mr. Bean
- Mr. Sunshine
- Menekşe ile Halil
- Miami Medical
- The Mysteries of Laura
- Mystery Woman
- Naša mala klinika
- Nati ieri
- Nikita
- North and South
- Numb3rs
- Partners
- Past Life
- Perception
- Person of Interest
- Plain Jane
- Political Animals
- Psych
- Ravenswood
- Revolution
- Ricomincio da me
- Scooby-Doo! Mystery Incorporated
- Sasuke
- Save Me
- Seinfeld
- Sex and the City
- Sıla
- Sonbahar
- Sheena
- Suburgatory
- Stalker
- Sullivan & Son
- Super Fun Night
- The Big C
- The Carrie Diaries
- The Client List
- The Forgotten
- The Fresh Prince of Bel-Air
- The Glades
- The Harveytoons Show
- The Lottery
- The Mentalist
- The Mists of Avalon
- The Mob Doctor
- The Nanny
- The Secret Circle
- The Thorn Birds
- The Thorn Birds: The Missing Years
- The Tudors
- Undercovers
- V
- Vruć vetar
- Walker, Texas Ranger
- XIII: The Series

=== TV & reality series/shows ===
==== Airing currently ====
- American Restoration (season 2 airing)
- Extreme Makeover (rerun of all seasons)

==== Ended ====
- Doma IN *
- Dr. 90210
- Extreme Makeover
- Fantasy Homes Down Under
- Grill Boss *
- Koktel *
- Mamin svijet *
- Masters of Illusion
- Slatki Božić *
- So You Think You Can Dance (seasons 5 & 6 aired)
- Super homes
- The Nate Berkus Show
- Zadovoljna *
- ZelenJava *

* Croatian TV shows
