= Nova Sport (Balkan TV channel) =

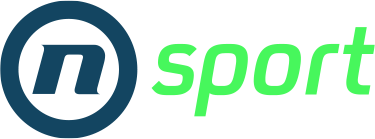

Programming
- Language: Serbo-Croatian
- Picture format: 1080i (HDTV)

Ownership
- Owner: United Group
- Sister channels: Sport Klub; Nova TV; Nova BH; Nova M Nova S Nova Series; Nova Max; N1; Doma TV; Mini TV

History
- Launched: 4 December 2019; 6 years ago
- Closed: November 25, 2025; 6 months ago

Links
- Website: nova-sport.com

Nova Sport was a secondary subscription sports channel, which started broadcasting on December 4, 2019 as a member of The United Group, currently the leading media platform in Southeast Europe, including the Sport Klub and Nova TV networks.

Nova Sport was United Media's channel for broadcasting the German Bundesliga and football matches from less attractive leagues such as the Finnish Veikkausliiga, the Czech First League, the Slovenian PrvaLiga, the Lithuanian A Lyga and the Belarusian Premier League. Other sports was include the Masters 1000 and ATP 500 tennis tournaments as well as Wimbledon and NASCAR championship races.

The channel ceased operations on April 3, 2025 in Serbia, Montenegro and North Macedonia, while in Croatia and Bosnia and Herzegovina it ceased operations on November 25, 2025, and it was merged into Sport Klub channels.

== Coverage area ==
The Nova Sport program was available via through Telemach EON TV and EON SAT in Bosnia and Herzegovina, Croatia and Slovenia.
