= Stanija Dobrojević =

Serbian television personality and model

- Станија Добројевић
- Born: 17 March 1985 (age 41); Virovitica, SR Croatia, SFR Yugoslavia
- Education: University of Novi Sad
- Occupations: TV personality; glamour model
- Years active: 2008–present
- Television: Survivor Serbia; Farma; Zadruga
- Height: 5 ft 4 in (1.63 m)

Stanija Dobrojević (Serbian Cyrillic: Станија Добројевић; born 17 March 1985) is a Serbian glamour model, reality television personality and former recording artist.

== Biography ==
Born in Virovitica and raised in Ruma, she rose to prominence as a contestant on Survivor Srbija VIP: Costa Rica in 2012. Stanija later won the sixth season of the reality show Farma (2015) with 57,6% of the public votes, receiving the main prize of €50,000.

Recognized as a sex symbol, she has been featured in numerous magazines, such as Maxim, FHM and Playboy. She also attended the Playboy Mansion as a playmate.

In 2015, Dobrojević graduated from the University of Novi Sad with a bachelor's degree in economics.

She moved into a penthouse apartment in Ruma during 2022. Stanija resides between Serbia and Ocean City, New Jersey.

== Filmography ==
Television appearances
Year	Title	Role	Notes
2012	Survivor Srbija	Herself	Season 4, 5th eliminated (disqualified)
2013	Zvezdara	Shqiptar's girlfriend	Season 1 (three episodes)
2013	Farma	Herself	Season 4, Runner-up
2015	Farma	Herself	Season 6, Winner
2018/2019	Zadruga	Herself	Season 2, 3rd place
2025/2026	Elita	Herself	Season 9, Winner

== Discography ==
Singles

- Glavni akter (2016)
- Na kraju balade (2016); feat. Marko Vanilla
- Sveta Marija (2017)
- Šta te to loži (2017); feat. MC Damiro

== See also ==
- List of glamour models
