= N1 (TV channel) =

Cable news channel in the Balkan states

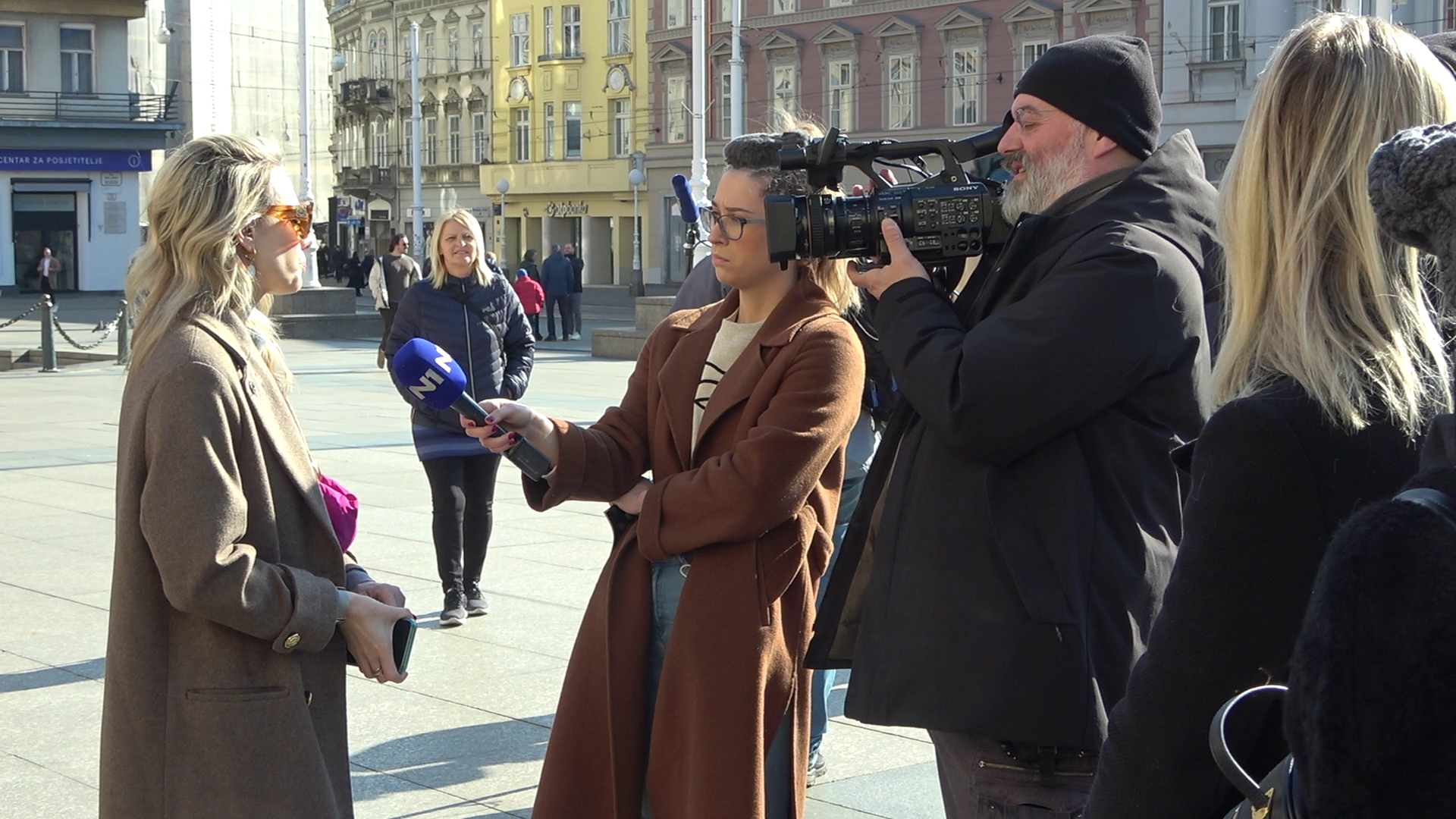
- Broadcast area: Southeast Europe
- Affiliates: CNN International
- Headquarters: Sarajevo, Bosnia and Herzegovina; Zagreb, Croatia; Belgrade, Serbia; Ljubljana, Slovenia

Programming
- Picture format: 576i (16:9 SDTV); 1080i (HDTV)

Ownership
- Owner: Alpac Capital

History
- Launched: 30 October 2014; 12 years ago

Links
- Website: n1info.com

N1 is a 24-hour cable news channel launched on 30 October 2014. The channel has headquarters in Ljubljana, Zagreb, Belgrade and Sarajevo and covers events happening in Central and Southeastern Europe. Available on cable TV throughout former Yugoslavia, N1 is CNN International's local broadcast partner and affiliate via an agreement with the London-based Warner Bros. Discovery EMEA. As it is focused on the audiences of the three countries in which it is headquartered, it has three separate editorial policies, separate reporters, TV studios as well as internet and mobile platforms. In cases where news overlaps, it is presented jointly.

== Serbia ==
The Organization for Security and Co-operation in Europe (OSCE) and Pauline Adès-Mével, a representative of Reporters Without Borders, described N1 as “the only big independent television station in Serbia”. Workers have been constantly labeled as “traitors” and “foreign mercenaries” and received hundreds of insults and threats of physical violence through social media. Unidentified individuals sent a letter to the station on 4 February 2019 threatening to kill its journalists and their families and blow up its offices.

After President of Serbia Vučić was hospitalized with cardiovascular problems in November 2019, his associates and pro-government media accused the N1 journalist Miodrag Sovilj of aggravating the President's health by probing allegations of corruption by government ministers. The Council of Europe's platform on journalist safety warns about a lack of state response to intimidation, threats and a smear campaign against Sovilj. The representative of Reporters Without Borders expressed concern about attacks faced by the Station’s executive director, as well as about the distribution of leaflets advising N1 to leave Serbia and threats made via social networks.

In January 2020, the European Federation of Journalists associated itself with the Independent Association of Serbia’s Journalists in supporting N1. It stated that it viewed the state-owned cable operator’s decision to drop N1 as an attempt to shut down critical discourse in Serbia. Parallel to the dispute between the United Group and cable operator, Harlem Désir, the OSCE Representative on Freedom of the Media and Reporters Without Borders both expressed concern over cyberattacks on N1’s Serbian web portal and mobile app.

== Investigative journalism in Slovenia ==
On 13 October 2023, the National Bureau of Investigation (NPU) filed criminal charges against Damjan Žugelj, former director of the Office for Money Laundering Prevention, and his closest associates on suspicion of abuse of office. The NPU stated that they were being prosecuted for unlawfully looking into 224 bank accounts in Slovenija, allegedly also including Dragan Šolak, the founder and co-owner of United Group and United Media, that owns N1. There were several other cases of bank accounts browsings based only on short anonymous letters during Žugelj's time, including the Office's investigation of the bank accounts of the wife of the Parliament President who an opposition member. Žugelj’s Office was browsing bank accounts of the Parliament President's wife at the very time when the then Janša coalition was unsuccessfully trying to remove him from his position.

In 2023 and 2024, N1 reported on mismanagement and physical abuse allegations at the University Psychiatric Clinic in Ljubljana (UPK Ljubljana). According to an official report, a commission of the Slovenian Ministry of Health that carried out an external supervision, proposed a range of measures, including replacing the management of UPK Ljubljana. The clinic denied the claims and has taken legal action. The clinic also responded to the report, but the final decision by the Ministry of Health has not yet been announced.

== Present personalities ==
N1 Sarajevo

- Amir Zukić – news director, editor, and host of the television show Pressing
- Nikola Vučić – editor and host of the talk show Izvan okvira
- Ajla Šabanović – editor and news anchor
- Amir Krivošija – editor and news anchor
- Minela Jašar-Opardija – editor and host of the morning program
- Sanela Dujković – editor and host of the morning program
