= Milica Dabović =

Serbian basketball player

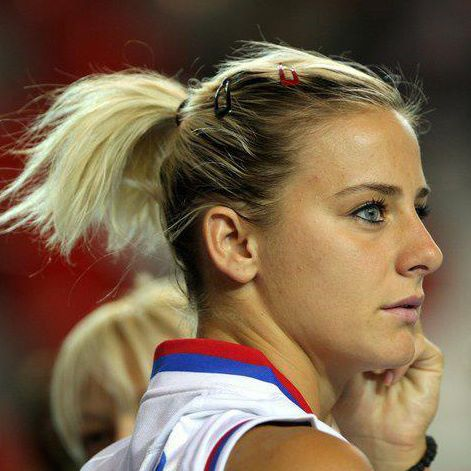
- Dabović with the Serbian national team in 2008

Personal information
- Born: 16 February 1982 (age 44) Cetinje, SR Montenegro, SFR Yugoslavia
- Listed height: 1.73 m (5 ft 8 in)

Career information
- WNBA draft: 2004: undrafted
- Playing career: 1998–2017, 2018–present
- Position: Point guard

Career history
- 1998–2002: Herceg Novi
- 2002–2003: Beopetrol
- 2003–2004: Crvena zvezda
- 2004: UMMC Ekaterinburg
- 2004–2005: Vojvodina
- 2005–2006: UMMC Ekaterinburg
- 2006–2007: Spartak Moscow Region
- 2007: TEO Vilnius
- 2007: Crvena zvezda
- 2007–2008: BC Moscow
- 2008: USO Mondeville
- 2008–2009: Beşiktaş
- 2009: Palaio Faliro
- 2009: HATIS Yerevan
- 2010: Lider Pruszkow
- 2010–2013: Partizan
- 2013–2014: Novi Zagreb
- 2014–2016: Union Lyon Basket
- 2016–2017: Sporting Al Riyadi Beirut
- 2018–2019: Flamurtari Vlorë
- 2019–2020: Vllaznia Shkodra
- 2021: Lavovi Brčko
- 2021: Tirana

Career highlights
- 4x Serbian League champion (2004, 2011–2013); 3x Serbian Cup winner (2004, 2011, 2013); 2x Adriatic League Women champion (2012, 2013)
Medals
Women's basketball
Representing Serbia
Olympic Games
Bronze medal – third place	2016 Rio de Janeiro	Team
EuroBasket
Gold medal – first place	2015 Budapest	Team

Milica Dabović (Serbian Cyrillic: Милица Дабовић; born 16 February 1982) is a former Serbian professional women's basketball player. She represented the Serbian national basketball team, winning Olympic bronze with the team at the 2016 Summer Olympics. Standing at 1.73 m (5 ft 8 in), she played at the point guard position.

== Club career ==
Dabović played for Partizan until August 2013, being part of the team which went the whole of the 2012–13 season unbeaten. She subsequently moved to Croatian side Novi Zagreb, signing a one-year contract in order to play in the EuroLeague Women.

== International career ==
Dabović captained the Serbia team at the EuroBasket 2015 in Budapest, picking up an elbow injury in the final which prevented her from taking part in the second half of the game. Despite her injury, Serbia defeated France in the final to win the gold medal, and qualified for the 2016 Summer Olympics, the first in the history for the Serbian team. In 2016, she announced her retirement from professional basketball after winning a bronze medal with Serbia at the Olympic games in Rio de Janeiro.

== Personal life ==
Her father is basketball coach Milan Dabović and her mother is Nevenka Simonović, a former handball player. Milica has a younger brother Milan – who is an active basketball player – and two sisters: the older Jelica, a former basketball player, and younger Ana, an active basketball player. On 20 December 2017, she gave birth to her son Stefan. In 2022, Dabović was cast in the television series Survivor: Dominican Republic.

Dabović is openly bisexual; she came out in June 2022 after a long period of speculation, confirming that at least one of her sexual and romantic partners was a woman. In late October 2022, Dabović opened an OnlyFans account.
