= Andrija Milošević =

Serbian actor from Montenegro (born 1978)

- Андрија Милошевић
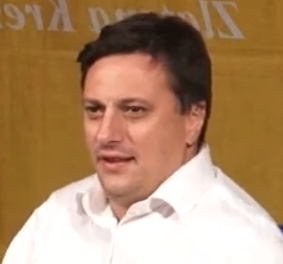
- Andrija Milošević in 2017
- Born: 6 August 1978 (age 48); Podgorica, SR Montenegro, SFR Yugoslavia
- Other name: Andro
- Occupations: Actor, television host
- Years active: 1995–present
- Spouse: Aleksandra Tomić (m. 2016)

Andrija Milošević (Serbian Cyrillic: Андрија Милошевић, born 6 August 1978) is a Montenegrin-born Serbian actor and television host. He is known for his roles in the theater show Pevaj, brate and TV series M(j)ešoviti brak, Budva na pjeni od mora and Ne daj se, Nina.

== Biography ==
Milošević was born in Titograd, SR Montenegro, SFR Yugoslavia as the elder son of mother Vera and father Peka. He has a younger brother Velibor. He spent his childhood in Nikšić, where he actively played football for Sutjeska.

At the age of sixteen he became a student in the first generation of the Faculty of Dramatic Arts in Cetinje. In the second year of studies he had first major role in theater and then he collaborated with theater director Milan Karadžić. In Montenegro, he played in various shows.

He moved to Belgrade in 2000, at the invitation of Svetozar Cvetković, who engaged him in Atelje 212 in show Coat of a dirty man. In 2003, he began working in a TV series Gej Brak with director Milan Afrojack and writer Stevan Koprivica. Montenegrin director Marija Perović awarded him with the lead role in the film Opet pakujemo majmune. In 2005, he founded the Udruženje ljubitelja filma production company in Podgorica.

He is the host of the Serbian version of the reality-show Survivor.

== Personal life ==
He was a close friend of Serbian actor Marinko Madžgalj who died on 26 March 2016. He has recommended Serbian youth to read Branko Ćopić.
