= Survivor VIP: Costa Rica =

- No. of days: 37
- No. of castaways: 18
- Winner: Vladimir "Vlada" Vuksanović
- Location: Corcovado, Costa Rica
- No. of episodes: 48

Release
- Original release: March 12 – June 2, 2012

Additional information
- Filming dates: January 19, 2012

Season chronology
- ← Previous; Survivor Srbija VIP: Philippines Next → Survivor: Dominican Republic

Survivor Srbija VIP: Costa Rica is the fourth season of the Serbian version of the Survivor television series, created by Vision Team production company and broadcast by Prva Srpska Televizija.

This is also the second season of the VIP format and the first season with contestants from Croatia.

The VIP season of Survivor Srbija is an international co-production recorded in Costa Rica for the first time.

In addition to Serbia, the show was broadcast in Croatia (RTL Televizija), Bosnia and Herzegovina (Televizija OBN), Macedonia (Sitel televizija) and Montenegro (PRO TV).

Featuring 18 contestants (9 men and 9 women), broadcast started on March 12, 2012.

The show is hosted by Andrija Milošević and for the first time Marijana Batinić.

Island of Dropped was again in play (in second season the name was "Ghost Island"): voted out players would be sent to Island of Dropped and participate in duels, with the winner remaining there until either the next duel or until two specific points where players were brought back into the game.

Vladimir "Vlada" Vuksanović was named the winner in the final episode on June 2, 2012, defeating Milan Gromilić, Nikola Šoć and Sebastijan Flajs with a vote of 6-5-2-0. He won a prize of €50.000.

== Contestants ==
Contestant	Original tribe	Swapped tribe	Merged tribe	Finish	Island of Dropped	Total votes
Aleksandra Nakova; 23, Gevgelija, Macedonia; Model	Boruka	Boruka		4th Voted Out; Day 13	3rd Eliminated; Day 14; Disqualified	9
Stanija Dobrojević; 27, Ruma; Starlet	Boruka			3rd Voted Out; Day 10	5th Eliminated; Day 17; Disqualified	5
Mia Begović; 49, Zagreb, Croatia; Actress	Matambo			2nd Voted Out; Day 7	1st Eliminated; 1st Jury Member; Day 9	5
Jelena Maćić; 44, Belgrade; Make-up artist	Matambo			1st Voted Out; Day 4	2nd Eliminated; 2nd Jury Member; Day 11	5
Radovan Stošić; 28, Zagreb, Croatia; Mister Croatia	Matambo	Matambo		6th Voted Out; Day 16	4th Eliminated; 3rd Jury Member; Day 17	7
Žarko "Žare" Berber; 43, Skopje, Macedonia; TV host	Boruka	Boruka		5th Voted Out; Day 16	6th Eliminated; 4th Jury Member; Day 20	4
Neven Ciganović; Returned to game	Matambo	Boruka		8th Voted Out; Day 22	7th Eliminated; Day 23	4
Marko Karadžić; Returned to game	Matambo	Boruka		7th Voted Out; Day 19	Winner; Day 23	7
Neven Ciganović; 42, Zagreb, Croatia; Stylist	Matambo	Boruka	Sibu	9th Voted Out; 5th Jury Member; Day 25		7
Marko Karadžić; 36, Belgrade; Politician	Matambo	Boruka	Sibu	10th Voted Out; 6th Jury Member; Day 25		9
Ognjen Kajganić; 36, Belgrade; Handball Player	Boruka	Matambo	Sibu	11th Voted Out; 7th Jury Member; Day 28		6
Maja Lena Lopatni; 21, Zagreb, Croatia; Student	Matambo	Matambo	Sibu	12th Voted Out; 8th Jury Member; Day 31		11
Aleksandra "Aleks" Grdić; 31, Virovitica, Croatia; Photo model/Miss Croatia	Boruka	Matambo	Sibu	13th Voted Out; 9th Jury Member; Day 34		4
Ava Karabatić; 24, Split, Croatia; Starlet	Boruka	Boruka	Sibu	14th Voted Out; 10th Jury Member; Day 34		16
Martina Vrbos; 28, Zagreb, Croatia; Singer and TV host	Matambo	Boruka	Sibu	Eliminated in Challenge; 11th Jury member Day 37		2
Kristina Bekvalac; 27, Novi Sad; Fashion designer	Matambo	Matambo	Sibu	Eliminated in Challenge; 12th Jury member Day 37		5
Sebastian Fleiss; 29, Samobor, Croatia; Snowboarder	Boruka	Matambo	Sibu	3rd Runner-up		1
Nikola Šoć; 26, Cetinje, Montenegro; Mannequin	Matambo	Matambo	Sibu	2nd Runner-up		3
Milan Gromilić; 33, Belgrade, Ballet dancer	Boruka	Boruka	Sibu	Runner-up		6^{5}
Vladimir "Vlada" Vuksanović; 24, Belgrade, Model	Boruka	Boruka	Sibu	Sole Survivor		0

The total votes is the number of votes a castaway has received during Tribal Councils where the castaway is eligible to be voted out of the game. It does not include the votes received during the final Tribal Council.

== The game ==
Cycles in this article refer to the three-day periods in the game (unless indicated), composed of at least the Immunity Challenge and the subsequent Tribal Council.

Cycle no.	Air dates	Challenges			Exiled	Tribal chief^{2}	Eliminated^{3}	Vote	Finish	Island of Dropped			
Cycle no.	Air dates	Reward	Immunity	Special Challenge^{1}	Exiled	Tribal chief^{2}	Eliminated^{3}	Vote	Finish	Inhabitant	Face-off Challenger	Eliminated	Finish
01	March 12 to March 15, 2012	Boruka	Boruka	Mia	None	Aleks	Jelena	5-3-1-1	1st Voted Out; Day 4				
01	March 12 to March 15, 2012	Boruka	Boruka	Mia	None	Neven	Jelena	5-3-1-1	1st Voted Out; Day 4				
02	March 19 to March 22, 2012	Boruka	Boruka	Neven	Kristina	Sebastijan	Mia	5-2-1-1-1	2nd Voted Out; Day 7	Jelena			
02	March 19 to March 22, 2012	Boruka	Boruka	Neven	Kristina	Martina	Mia	5-2-1-1-1	2nd Voted Out; Day 7	Jelena			
03	March 26 to March 29, 2012	Matambo	Matambo	Aleksandra	Aleks	Ognjen	Stanija	5-4-1	3rd Voted Out; Day 10	Jelena	Mia	Mia	1st Eliminated; 1st Jury Member; Day 9
03	March 26 to March 29, 2012	Matambo	Matambo	Aleksandra	Aleks	Marko	Stanija	5-4-1	3rd Voted Out; Day 10	Jelena	Mia	Mia	1st Eliminated; 1st Jury Member; Day 9
04	April 2 to April 5, 2012	Matambo	Matambo	Milan	Neven	Milan	Aleksandra	8-1-1	4th Voted Out; Day 13	Jelena	Stanija	Jelena	2nd Eliminated; 2nd Jury Member; Day 11
04	April 2 to April 5, 2012	Matambo	Matambo	Milan	Neven	Kristina	Aleksandra	8-1-1	4th Voted Out; Day 13	Jelena	Stanija	Jelena	2nd Eliminated; 2nd Jury Member; Day 11
05	April 9 to April 12, 2012	Boruka	Aleks	None	Radovan^{4}	Vlada	Žare	4-2-1-1	5th Voted Out; Day 16	Stanija	Aleksandra	Aleksandra	3rd Eliminated; Day 14
05	April 9 to April 12, 2012	Boruka	Milan	None	Radovan^{4}	Nikola	Radovan	5-3	6th Voted Out; Day 16	Stanija	Aleksandra	Aleksandra	3rd Eliminated; Day 14
06	April 16 to April 19, 2012	Matambo	Matambo	Marko	Milan	Ava	Marko	3-0^{5}	7th Voted Out; Day 19	Stanija	Žare	Radovan	4th Eliminated; 3rd Jury Member; Day 17
06	April 16 to April 19, 2012	Matambo	Matambo	Marko	Milan	Sebastijan	Marko	3-0^{5}	7th Voted Out; Day 19	Stanija	Radovan	Stanija	5th Eliminated; Day 17
07	April 23 to April 26, 2012	Matambo	Matambo	Milan	Martina	Vlada	Neven	3-1-1	8th Voted Out; Day 22	Žare	Marko	Žare	6th Eliminated; 4th Jury Member; Day 20
07	April 23 to April 26, 2012	Matambo	Matambo	Milan	Martina	Ognjen	Neven	3-1-1	8th Voted Out; Day 22	Žare	Marko	Žare	6th Eliminated; 4th Jury Member; Day 20
08	April 30 to May 3, 2012	Aleks^{7}	Kristina, Maja Lena, Martina, Milan, Ognjen, Sebastijan	Vlada	Ava	~~Milan~~	Neven	7-6	9th Voted Out; 5th Jury Member; Day 25	Marko^{8}	Neven	Neven	7th Eliminated; Day 23
08	April 30 to May 3, 2012	Aleks^{7}	Kristina, Maja Lena, Martina, Milan, Ognjen, Sebastijan	Vlada	Ava	~~Nikola~~	Marko	9-2	10th Voted Out; 6th Jury Member; Day 25	Marko^{8}	Neven	Neven	7th Eliminated; Day 23
09	May 8 to May 11, 2012	Sebastijan [Kristina]	~~Sebastijan~~ (Nikola)^{9}	Aleks	Maja Lena		Ognjen	6-3-2	11th Voted Out; 7th Jury Member; Day 28				
10	May 15 to May 18, 2012	Survivor; Auction	Ava, Martina, Nikola, Vlada	Vlada	Sebastijan		Maja Lena	6-2-1-1	12th Voted Out; 8th Jury Member; Day 31				
11	May 22 to May 25, 2012	Vlada [Sebastijan]	Milan	Sebastijan	Vlada		Aleks	4-2-1	13th Voted Out; 9th Jury Member; Day 34				
11	May 22 to May 25, 2012	Vlada [Sebastijan]	Milan	Sebastijan	Vlada		Ava	4-2-1	14th Voted Out; 10th Jury Member; Day 34				
12	May 28 to May 30, 2012	None		Sebastijan	None		Martina	No vote	Eliminated in challenge 11th Jury Member; Day 37				
12	May 28 to May 30, 2012	None		Milan	None		Martina	No vote	Eliminated in challenge 11th Jury Member; Day 37				
12	May 28 to May 30, 2012	None		Vlada	None		Kristina	No vote	Eliminated in challenge 12th Jury Member; Day 37				
12	May 28 to May 30, 2012	None		Nikola	None		Kristina	No vote	Eliminated in challenge 12th Jury Member; Day 37				
Final	June 2, 2012	Jury vote					Sebastijan	6-5-2-0	3rd Runner-up				
Final	June 2, 2012	Jury vote					Nikola	6-5-2-0	2nd Runner-up				
Final	June 2, 2012	Jury vote					Milan	6-5-2-0	Runner-up				
Final	June 2, 2012	Jury vote					Vlada	6-5-2-0	Sole Survivor				

In the case of multiple tribes or castaways who win reward or immunity, they are listed in order of finish, or alphabetically where it was a team effort; where one castaway won and invited others, the invitees are in brackets.

^1 Through cycle 1 to 11 the winner of challenge had the opportunity to choose "Double Vote" or "Black Vote", and at cycle 12 the challenge was "Place in the Final" where the remaining castaways compete in three final challenges for a place in the final.

^2 Tribal chiefs are leaders of his tribes. They are voted from the rest of the tribal members and they have Individual Immunity during Tribal Council. Every cycle tribes choose another Tribal chief and one member can't be chief two times in a row.

^3 In a new twist, every eliminated castaway had the opportunity to throw a curse on one member of his former tribe. Before s/he went on Island of Dropped, s/he will vote for one member and that vote will count during the next Tribal Council.

^4 Radovan chose to go into exile, so one vote would be against him on the next Tribal Council.

^5 Because Milan played the Hidden Immunity Idol, five votes against him did not count.

^7 Aleks won a Special Immunity and she can't be voted out until second to last Tribal Council, but until then she must win in one Immunity challenge and one Special challenge and she will be the first finalist. She won only one Special challenge and no Immunity, so she failed.

^8 Marko won the last challenge on Island of Dropped, so he is back in merge tribe, but he must to choose one eliminated player to join him in new tribe; Marko chose Neven, so merge tribe is complete.

^9 Sebastijan gave his immunity to Nikola.

== Voting history ==
Tribal Council (TC) numbers are almost the same as Cycle numbers, as a Tribal Council occurs at the end of each cycle; eliminations that happen outside a Tribal Council do not bear a Tribal Council number, but count towards a cycle. Episode numbers denote the episode(s) when the voting and subsequent revelation of votes and elimination during a Tribal Council took place. They can also denote the episode wherein a contestant officially left the game for any reason.

	Original tribes			Swapped tribes				
TC #:	1	2	3	4	5		6	7
Episode No.:	4	8	12	16	20		24	28
Eliminated:	Jelena; 5/10 votes	Mia; 5/10 votes	Stanija; 5/10 votes	Aleksandra; 8/10 votes	Žare; 4/8 votes	Radovan; 5/8 votes^{4}	Marko; 3/3 votes^{5}	Neven; 3/5 votes
Voter	Vote							
Aleks			Milan			Radovan		
Ava			Aleksandra	Aleksandra	Žare		~~Milan~~	Neven
Kristina	Jelena	Mia				Maja Lena		
Maja Lena	Kristina	Nikola				Radovan		
Martina	Jelena	Mia		Aleksandra	Žare		~~Milan~~	Ava
Milan			Stanija	Aleksandra; Aleksandra	Martina		Marko	Neven
Nikola	Jelena	Mia				Maja Lena		
Ognjen			Stanija			Radovan		
Sebastijan			Stanija			Radovan		
Vlada			Stanija	Aleksandra	Marko		Marko	Neven
Neven	Jelena	Radovan; Nikola		Aleksandra	Žare		~~Milan~~	(~~Milan~~)^{9}
Marko	Radovan	Mia		Aleksandra	Žare		~~Milan~~; ~~Milan~~ (Milan)	
Radovan	Jelena	Mia				Maja Lena (~~Maja Lena~~)^{9}		
Žare			Stanija	Aleksandra	Marko (Marko)			
Aleksandra			Milan; Milan	Ava (Ava)				
Stanija			Milan (~~Aleks~~)^{5}					
Mia	Kristina; Kristina	Marko (Marko)						
Jelena	Nikola (Neven)							

Votes in brackets are an opportunity to eliminate a castaway to throw a curse on one member of his former tribe. That vote will count during the next Tribal Council.

	Merged tribe							
TC #:	8		9	10	11^{10}		Challenge	
Episode No.:	32		36	40	44		47	
Eliminated:	Neven; 7/13 votes	Marko; 9/11 votes	Ognjen; 6/11 votes	Maja Lena; 6/10 votes	Aleks; 4/7 votes	Ava; 2/7 votes	Martina; No vote	Kristina; No vote
Voter	Vote							
Vlada	Neven; Neven	Marko	Maja Lena	Maja Lena; Kristina	Aleks			
Milan	Neven	Marko	Ava	Maja Lena	Aleks			
Nikola	Neven	Marko	Maja Lena	Maja Lena	Aleks			
Sebastijan	Neven	Marko	Ava	Maja Lena	Aleks			
Kristina	Ava	Marko	Ognjen	Maja Lena	Ava			
Martina	Ava	Marko	Ognjen	Maja Lena	Ava			
Ava	Neven	Marko	Ognjen	Kristina	Martina			
Aleks	Ava	Ava	Ognjen; Ognjen	Sebastijan				
Maja Lena	Ava	Marko	Ognjen	Milan				
Ognjen	Neven	Marko	Ava					
Marko	Ava	Ava						
Neven	Ava							

This castaway could not vote at Tribal Council, because s/he had the "Black Vote necklace".

Jury vote
Finalist:	Sebastijan; 0/13 votes	Nikola; 2/13 votes	Milan; 5/13 votes	Vlada; 6/13 votes
Juror	Vote			
Kristina				Vlada
Martina				Vlada
Ava				Vlada; Vlada^{11}
Aleks		Nikola		
Maja Lena			Milan	
Ognjen				Vlada
Marko			Milan	
Neven		Nikola		
Žare			Milan	
Radovan				Vlada
Jelena			Milan	
Mia			Milan	

^5 Because Aleks had Individual Immunity, this vote against her did not count.

^9 This vote did not count because of the merge.

^10 At 11th Tribal Council, the castaways voted out two persons, although they voted only one time.

^11 Ava is a favorite of the audience, and thereby acquired the right of double vote.
