= Nova TV (Croatia) =

Croatian television network

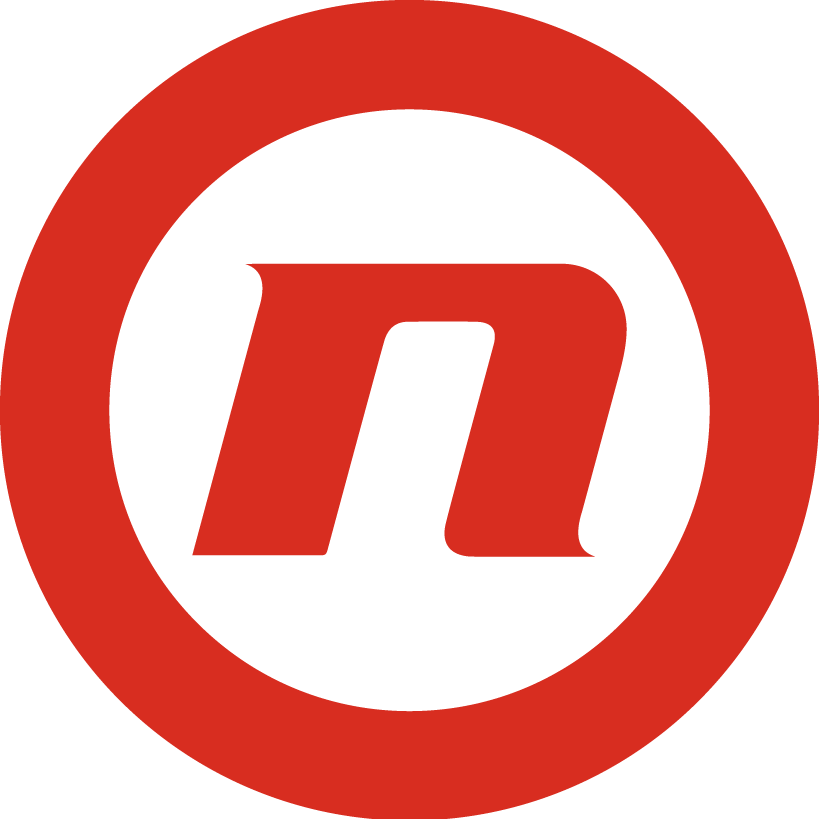
- Type: Free-to-air television network
- Country: Croatia
- Headquarters: Zagreb, Croatia

Programming
- Language: Croatian
- Picture format: 1080p HDTV

Ownership
- Owner: Alpac Capital
- Parent: Adria News Network
- Sister channels: Nova S; Nova BH; Nova M; Nova Sport; Nova Series; Nova Max; Doma TV; Mini TV; Nova World

History
- Launched: 28 May 2000; 26 years ago

Links
- Website: www.novatv.hr

Availability

Terrestrial
- OiV: MUX M1 (channel numbers may vary)

Nova TV is a Croatian free-to-air television network launched on 28 May 2000. It was the first commercial television network with national concession in the country. From 2004 until 2018, it was fully owned by the Central European Media Enterprises. In 2018, Direct Media purchased Nova TV and Doma TV.

Nova TV is, along with HRT and RTL, one of the three Croatian television channels that air the largest amount of original programming in Croatia. The channel has its own everyday news programming, as well as various scripted television series. A smaller quantity of original reality and game show series is also aired by the channel. The channel also airs acquired foreign programming, both television series (mostly English or Turkish) and movies.

Currently, Nova TV's programming schedule usually consists of children's programming (mostly acquired animated series) airing in the morning, followed by re-runs of original and acquired television series during the day. The prime time is generally reserved for news and other original programming.

== Original programming ==
=== News programming ===
Dnevnik Nove TV is the main news program of Nova TV. It is broadcast daily at 19:00 UTC. As of 2008, and it was the second most popular news program in Croatia, closing in on Dnevnik HRT, its main competitor. Dnevnik Nove TV overtook Dnevnik HRT in 2010, becoming the most watched news programme in Croatia. Since its launch in 2005, the style of the broadcast has changed little.

A minor incident occurred in 2015, when Milorad Pupovac, a vice-president of Independent Democratic Serb Party, was forced out of the programme for his speech on the removal of Cyrillic tables in Vukovar by an amendment of the City Statute, due to "being in 2015". Both sides, Serbian and Croatian, apparently condemned the incident, some likening it with the forced takeaway of the right to free speech. However, Nova TV soon issued a response in which they said that:

Nova TV's news anchor sought to focus the guest on the issue for which he was invited to the show. Given the fact that our guest continuously kept digressing off the topic, the host had to end the conversation at certain moment because [...] it was a live interview, within a show which also deals with other topics [...]. Just like many times before, Mr. Pupovac will continue being relevant and respected guest in our studios.

=== Scripted series ===
==== Dramas and telenovelas ====
- Zakon ljubavi (2008)
- Najbolje godine (2009–2011)
- Larin izbor (2011–2013)
- Pod sretnom zvijezdom (2011)
- Stella (2013)
- Zora dubrovačka (2013–2014)
- Kud puklo da puklo (2014–2016)
- Zlatni dvori (2016–2017)
- Čista ljubav (2017–2018)
- Na granici (2018–2019)
- Drugo ime ljubavi (2019–2020)
- Dar mar (2020–2021)
- Bogu iza nogu (2021–)
- Kumovi (2022–)
- U dobru i zlu (2024)

==== Comedy series ====
The station also became notable for showing one of the first Croatian sitcoms called Naša mala klinika, which started to air in November 2004, and in early June 2005 the channel started airing another locally produced sitcom called Bumerang.

- Naša mala klinika (2004–2007)
- Bumerang (2005–2006)
- Cimmer fraj (2006–2007)
- Večernja škola (2007–2008)
- Zauvijek susjedi (2007–2008)
- Bračne vode (2008–2009)
- Periferija city (2009–2010)
- Ah, taj Ivo! (2012) (Note: The pilot episode of Ah, taj Ivo! aired on 27 May 2012. The series was cancelled following the negative reviews.)
- Samo ti pričaj (2015–2016)
- Kad susjedi polude (2018)

=== Reality series ===
In 2003, Nova TV premiered the first Croatia iteration of American Idol titled Story Supernova Music Talents, which was then followed by the Croatian version of Pop Idol called Hrvatski idol in 2004.

Supertalent, the Croatian entry in the Got Talent franchise, is a part of Nova TV's staple programming, airing since September 2009. It is one of Nova TV's longest-running original series, set to enter its eleventh season in Fall 2024. Nova TV rebooted Ples sa zvijezdama, which previously aired 8 seasons on HRT 1. A reboot of Survivor, which previously aired a season on HRT 2 in 2005 and another one on RTL in 2012, premiered on Nova TV in March 2022.

Legend
Series in production
Series no longer in production
Status of series unknown

Name	Based on	Host(s)	No. of seasons	Premiere
Story Supernova Music Talents (Note: Series continued by RTL as Hrvatska traži zvijezdu from 2009 to 2011, and later rebooted as Superstar in 2023.)	Idol	unknown	1	2003
Hrvatski Idol	Idol	Nikolina Božić; Vinko Štefanac (s. 1); Predrag Šuka (s. 2)	2	24 April 2004
Farma (Note: In 2024, RTL announced the reboot of the series under the same name.)	The Farm	Mia Kovačić (s. 1–7); Davor Dretar (s. 1, 3, 6); Dušan Bućan (s. 4–5); Dražen Kocijan (s. 2); Nikolina Pišek (s. 2–3)	7	9 March 2008
Supertalent	Got Talent	Former: Rene Bitorajac (s. 1–6); Current: Igor Mešin (s. 1–10); Frano Ridjan (s. 7–10)	13	25 September 2009
MasterChef Croatia	MasterChef	–	9	21 March 2011
Tvoje lice zvuči poznato	Your Face Sounds Familiar	Former: Rene Bitorajac (s. 1–5); Maja Šuput (s. 6–7); Frano Ridjan (s. 6–7); Current: Igor Mešin (s. 1–5, 8); Filip Detelić (s. 8)	10	5 October 2014
Ženim sina?	unknown	Irina Čulinović	5	23 April 2018
Ples sa zvijezdama (Note: Seasons 1–8 of Ples sa zvijezdama aired on HRT 1 from 2006 to 2013. The first season to premiere on Nova TV in 2019 is the ninth season of the series overall.)	Dancing with the Stars	Mia Kovačić (s. 9); Janko Popović Volarić (s. 9); Maja Šuput (s. 10); Igor Mešin (s. 10–11); Tamara Loos (s. 11)	3	17 March 2019
Ljepotice i genijalci	Beauty and the Geek	Igor Mešin	1	18 March 2019
Survivor Croatia (Note: Season 1 of Survivor aired on HRT 2 in 2005, followed by Season 2 on RTL in 2012. The first season to premiere on Nova TV in 2022 is the third season of the series overall.)	Survivor	Former: Mario Mlinarić (s. 1–3); Current: Vlado Boban (s. 4)	5	14 March 2022
Riba na torti	Hal a tortán	Ivan Pažanin	1	13 November 2023

=== Other notable programming ===
- Laku noć, Hrvatska (2005–2008, adult animated parody series)
- Red Carpet (2003–2012, a showbiz magazine programme)
- Provjereno (2007–, an investigative journalism news magazine)
- Istraga (2005–2009, a crime documentary series)
- Nad lipom 35 (2006–2021, a mixture of a sitcom and a musical performance series, also the channel's New Year's special from 2010 to 2021)
- Ne zaboravi stihove (2008–2009, a musical game show)
- Trenutak istine (2008–2009, a game show based on The Moment of Truth)
- IN magazin (2009–, a celebrity gossip magazine)
- Startaj Hrvatska (2020–, a competition series promoting various original Croatian products)
- I godina nova (2022–, a new Year special comedy and musical performance series)
- Joker (2024–, a game show series based on the Turkish series of the same name)
- Tko to tamo pjeva? (2024–, based on I Can See Your Voice)

== Acquired programming ==
As the first Croatian commercial television network, Nova TV made the Croatian TV viewers familiar with reality shows when first airing the American shows such as Survivor and Temptation Island. Nova TV was also the first television network to show The Jerry Springer Show in Croatia, which ran until 2022. In 2005, the channel also introduced popular American TV series such as Lost (2004–2010) and Desperate Housewives (2004–2012) as well as reality show The Apprentice (2004–2017) to the Croatian audience. Nova TV is also known for broadcasting newer blockbusters first released in the 1990s and the 2000s as well as some less popular television or cinema movies that are quite hard to find anywhere else in Croatia.

=== Sports programming ===
Nova TV is also notable for live broadcasts of various sporting events such as alpine skiing and Mirko Filipović's fights. For many years, they have also been broadcasting FA Premier League matches, as well as some of the English cup matches. However, they stopped showing English football following the end of the 2006–07 season, with the Premier League now available in Croatia through RTL Televizija. In 2009, Nova TV bought the rights to show the UEFA Champions League matches played on Tuesdays until 2012. Their Champions League coverage consists of one live broadcast and the highlights of all the remaining matches of the night, but not the final, which is broadcast by HRT. In 2018, Nova TV bought all Croatia national football team fixtures live until 2028.

The channel aired UEFA, UEFA Nations League and UEFA European Qualifiers road to Euro and World Cup.

=== Turkish series ===
Nova TV is known for acquiring numerous Turkish drama series, which have been popular on the channel since 2010s.

Original title	Croatian title	Original premiere	Nova TV premiere
Hayat Şarkısı	Djevojka sa sela	February 9, 2016	June 4, 2018
Çocuk	Dijete	September 9, 2019	July 1, 2020
Benim Adım Melek	Melek	September 25, 2019	July 5, 2021
Alev Alev	U plamenu	November 5, 2020	July 5, 2021
Zemheri	Ljubavna oluja	January 15, 2020	August 23, 2021
Sadakatsiz	Nevjera	October 7, 2020	January 3, 2022
Kardeşlerim	Snaga obitelji	February 20, 2021	May 16, 2022
Iyilik	Izdaja	April 29, 2022	January 2, 2023
Yalı Çapkını	Zlatni kavez	September 23, 2022	May 29, 2023
Yüz Yillik Mucize	Sto godina čuda	March 23, 2023	August 21, 2023
Masumlar Apartmanı	Duhovi prošlosti	September 15, 2020	October 9, 2023
Veda Mektubu	Oproštajno pismo	February 27, 2023	January 1, 2024
Yürek Çıkmazı	Ulica sjećanja	November 1, 2022	January 1, 2024
Yabani	Divlje srce	September 12, 2023	June 4, 2024

=== Animated series ===
Nova TV features Croatian dubs of various popular animated series for children, which mostly air in the mornings. In the late 2000s, it was the first channel to air Croatian dubs of popular series such as Dora the Explorer, Bratz, Peppa Pig and Winx Club. Nova TV's children programming also airs on Mini TV, a specialized channel launched on 1 October 2008.

- Be Cool, Scooby-Doo!
- Johnny Bravo
- Dexter's Laboratory
- Digimon
- Pokémon
- The Harveytoons Show
- Transformers
- Sailor Moon
- Dragon Ball Z
- Sgt. Frog
- The Powerpuff Girls
- Mon Colle Knights
- Action Man
- Teletubbies
- Yu-Gi-Oh
- South Park
- Eon Kid
- Dora the Explorer
- Shaman King
- Bob the Builder
- Thomas & Friends
- PopPixie
- Winx Club
- Elena of Avalor
- The Tom and Jerry Show
- Timon & Pumbaa
- Tom & Jerry Kids
- Aladdin
- Animaniacs

== Audience share ==
Television viewership research based on 900 Croatian households (published by Agencija za elektroničke medije)
Y/M	Jan.	Feb.	Mar.	Apr.	May	Jun.	Jul.	Aug.	Sep.	Oct.	Nov.	Dec.	Annual average
2023	14%	14.5%	16.6%	15.7%	15.7%	17.3%	15.5%	15.1%	17.6%	18.3%	18.4%	17.5%	16.3%
2024	15.1%	16.4%	18.7%	18.7%	16.3%	14.1%	Upcoming period						17%
