= Jablanovec =

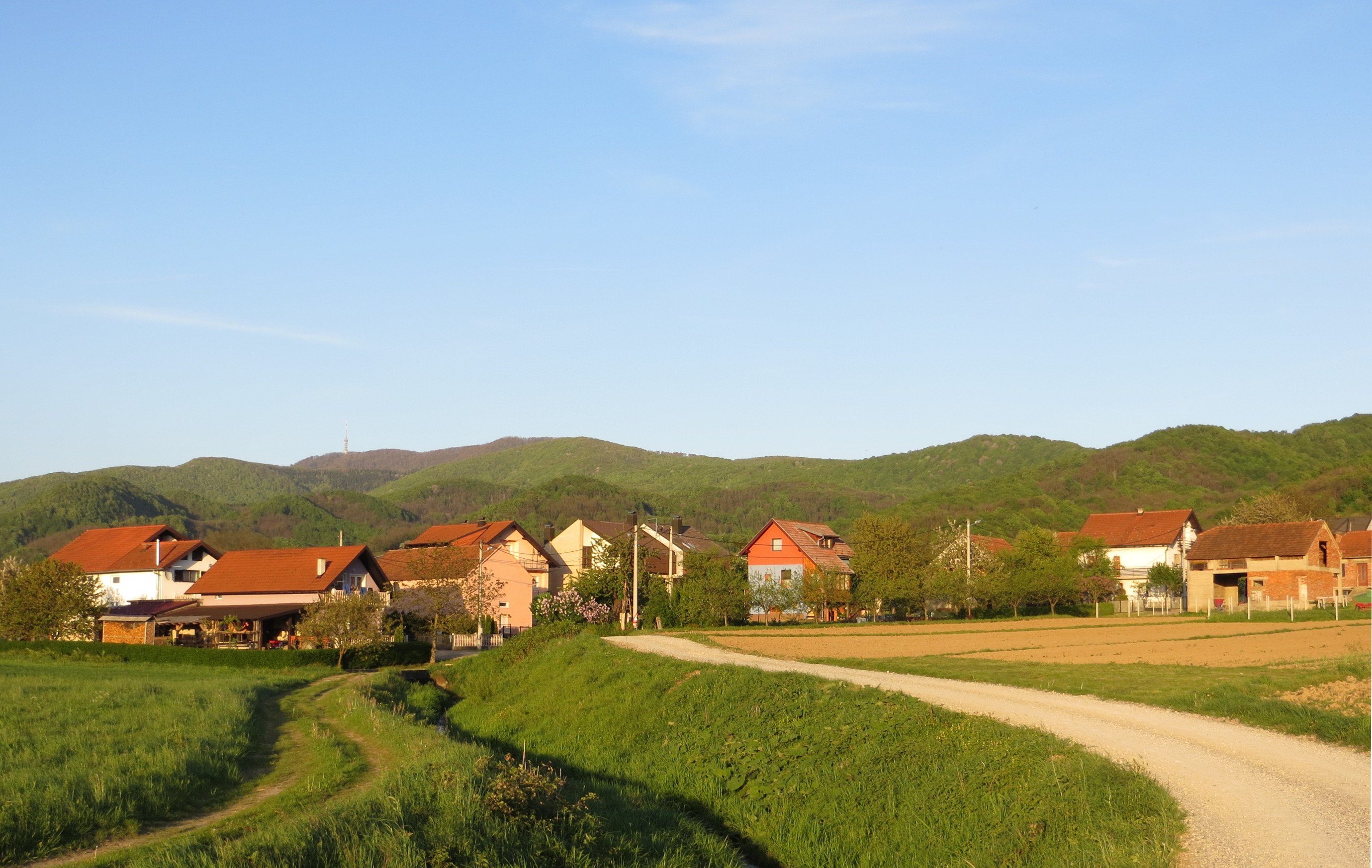

- Location within Croatia
- Coordinates: 45°52′51″N 15°51′19″E
- Country: Croatia
- County: Zagreb County
- City: Zaprešić

Area
  - Total: 7.5 km^{2} (2.9 sq mi)

Population (2021)
  - Total: 1,301
  - Density: 170/km^{2} (450/sq mi)
- Time zone: UTC+1 (CET)
  - Summer (DST): UTC+2 (CEST)

Jablanovec is a settlement in the town of Zaprešić, Zagreb County, Croatia. According to the 2001 census, it has 1,343 inhabitants living in an area of 8.07 square kilometers (3.12 sq mi).
