= Nova (Serbia) =

Serbian television channel

Nova S
- Type: Free-to-air television network
- Country: Serbia
- Availability: National
- Headquarters: Belgrade, Serbia
- Owner: Alpac Capital
- Parent: Adria News Network
- Launch date: 15 December 2017; 8 years ago TOP kanal (formerly); 25 March 2019; 7 years ago Nova S
- Picture format: 1080i (HDTV)
- Affiliations: Nova TV; Nova BH; Nova M; Nova Sport; Nova Series; Nova Max
- Official website: www.nova.rs

Nova is a cable television network launched on 25 March 2019. 15 December 2017 as TOP kanal. Nova S, alongside the channels Nova TV, Nova BH and Nova M are part of the Adria News Network and owned by Alpac Capital.
