= Nova BH =

Bosnian television channel

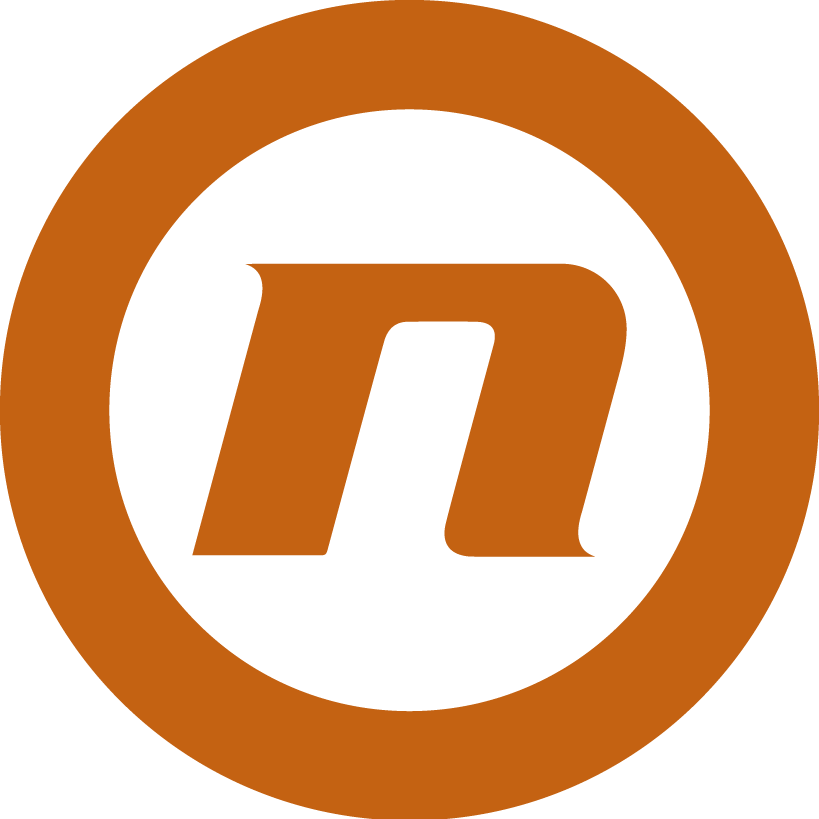
- Type: Free-to-air television network
- Country: Bosnia and Herzegovina
- Availability: National
- Headquarters: Sarajevo, Bosnia and Herzegovina
- Owner: Alpac Capital
- Parent: Adria News Network
- Launch date: 9 October 2018; 8 years ago
- Former names: Pink BH (2003–18)
- Picture format: 1080i (HDTV)
- Affiliations: Nova S; Nova TV; Nova M; Nova Sport; Nova Series; Nova Max
- Official website: novabh.tv
- Language: Bosnian

Nova BH is a Bosnian commercial television channel launched on 9 October 2018. From 2003 to 2018, this national commercial station formerly was known as Pink BH. From October 2018 until August 2026, Nova BH is a member of the United Media portfolio, the leading media platform in South East Europe, and since August 2026, Nova BH is part of Alpac Capital. Headquarters is located in Sarajevo and Nova BH also has offices and studios in Banja Luka.

== Overview ==
Nova BH aired in October 2018.

== Dnevnik Newsmax Adria ==
Dnevnik Newsmax Adria is the main news program of Nova BH, broadcast daily at 18:15 UTC. Dnevnik Newsmax Adria is the central news program on Nova BH television. Dnevnik Newsmax Adria is under the new visual identity and license of the American media empire Newsmax. Since its launch in 2020, the style of the broadcast hasn't changed much.

== Channel availability ==
As of January 2022, Nova BH can be watched via a terrestrial signal, and Telemach, TotalTV, Eronet and BH Telecom in Bosnia & Herzegovina.

In February 2020 BH Telecom, Eronet and Mtel denied the offer from United Group about how they were going to make a €0,60 fee for watching Nova BH, so they excluded it from their program schedules. In 2021 however, BH Telecom and Eronet returned Nova BH to their program schedule.

== History ==
=== Pink BH (2003–2018) ===
In May 2003, a newly founded Pink BH began operations in Bosnia and Herzegovina.

Through the acquisition of local TV stations (RTV Kometa, NRTV Banja Luka, RTV Step, TV GLS, RTV Info Tes, TV Teodora, and TV Ljubinje), Bosnian subsidiary of Pink TV and Pink International Company also took over their terrestrial broadcasting frequencies.

With two production centers, offices and studios in Sarajevo and Banja Luka, the channel received its broadcast license for a ten-year period from the Bosnia-Herzegovina Communications Regulatory Agency (RAK) on 15 July 2005. Soon, Pink BH reach more than 80 percent of the country, covering some 63 percent of the BiH population. On 24 June 2008, the Pink Media Group opened its new headquarters in the Sarajevo neighbourhood of Alipašino polje.

Thanks to various TV content (mostly music and entertainment), Pink BH was leading television station countrywide, beating out other privately owned commercial stations and the public television stations. It was only television station that has managed to cultivate audiences in both administrative entities of Bosnia and Herzegovina (the Federation of BiH and Republika Srpska), and among all three major ethnic groups. The station also became notable for showing popular American TV series such as Charmed and Baywatch as well as Bosnian sitcoms called Sex i Selo and Mahalaši.

Most popular music and entertainment shows often were re-broadcast from Serbian RTV Pink. Later, the share of domestic production has increased by home-made TV shows like "Sarajevo On Line", "Made in Banja Luka", "Zabranjeni forum", "Sa Tanjom na ti", "Dobar komšija", "Izzy game" etc.

Thanks to regional joint production (Pink TV, Pink BH and Pink M), a popular morning program called Balkan Net was aired live from four TV studios (Belgrade in Serbia, Sarajevo and Banja Luka in Bosnia, and Budva or Podgorica in Montenegro).

Also, many international formats from Endemol Shine Group have been broadcast in co-operation with Emotion production company, for the first time in Balkan countries like Veliki Brat - Big Brother, M(ij)enjam ženu – local version of Wife Swap, Ruski rulet – Russian roulette etc.

In April 2010, it was reported that Pink BH downsized a large portion of its staff. Out of 163 employees, 57 got laid off on this occasion. The network's management said the decision had been made due to the station's decreasing revenue that went down 50% since 2008. Similarly, the once most watched station's viewership decreased in this period. In April 2014, many Bosnian and Serbian media reported that Pink TV will move all 68 cable channels from Serbia to Bosnia and Herzegovina (via PMG and Pink BH headquarters in Sarajevo) where program distribution fees were far cheaper.

=== Nova BH (2018–present) ===
In June 2018, Pink International Company (part of PMG) sold to Direct Media its Montenegrin and Bosnian divisions — Pink M and Pink BH, respectively. On 4 September 2018, PMG launched a new cable channel called Pink Media BH for Bosnian market.

On 9 October 2018, the station has been renamed to Nova BH.

In 2022, Nova BH became the most watched TV channel in Bosnia and Herzegovina, with 10,1% share.

== Currently airing ==
=== Nationally created shows currently broadcast by Nova BH (as of January 2022) ===
Original name	Format	Origin
Dnevnik Nove BH	news	Bosnia & Herzegovina
Nova IN	magazine	Bosnia & Herzegovina
Kud puklo da puklo	sitcom	Croatia
Dar Mar	sitcom	Croatia
Lud, zbunjen, normalan	sitcom	Bosnia & Herzegovina
Ambasadorova kći	telenovela	Turkey
Zvezde Granda (Specijal)	reality show	Serbia
Nikad nije kasno	reality show	Serbia
Supertalent	reality show	Croatia
Masterchef	reality show	Croatia
Praktična Žena	reality show	Serbia
Totalni obrt	gameshow	Serbia
U plamenu	telenovela	Turkey
24 minute sa Zoranom Kesićem	talkshow	Serbia
Jama	telenovela	Turkey
Survivor	reality show	Croatia

=== Sports broadcasting ===
Bosnia and Herzegovina national football team matches at UEFA Nations League, European Qualifiers, and friendly matches (2018–2022).
