= Nova M =

Television station in Montenegro

- Type: Free-to-air television network
- Country: Montenegro
- Availability: National
- Headquarters: Podgorica, Montenegro
- Owner: Adria News Network
- Parent: Alpac Capital
- Launch date: 9 October 2018; 8 years ago
- Picture format: 1080i (HDTV)
- Affiliations: Nova S; Nova TV; Nova BH; Nova Sport; Nova Series; Nova Max
- Official website: www.novam.tv

Nova M is a television station in Montenegro with a signal and broadcast licence that covers its entire territory.

== History ==
Founded by Serbian Pink International Company, Pink M operated as its Montenegrin subsidiary. It was started in December 2002 based out of Podgorica with an additional studio in Budva built and opened during summer 2005. In June 2018, Pink International Company sold to Direct Media its Montenegrin and Bosnian divisions – Pink M and Pink BH, respectively.

== Previously aired popular programs ==
- UEFA Champions League
- UEFA Europa League
- Premier League (formerly)
- Veliki brat (formerly)

=== Series currently broadcast ===
Title on Nova M	Original title	Origin
Elif	Elif	Turkey
Bahar	O hayat benim	Turkey
Beskrajna ljubav	Kara Sevda	Turkey

=== Sports currently broadcast ===
Montenegro matches at UEFA Nations League, European Qualifiers, and friendly match (2018–2022).

=== Previously aired telenovelas ===
Title on Nova M	Original title	Origin
Oluja	La tempestad	Mexico
Naslednici	Los Herederos del Monte	Colombia, United States
Sobarica i senator	Una Maid en Manhattan	United States
Moje srce kuca za Lolu	Mi Corazón Insiste… en Lola Volcán	United States
Tajna ljubav	La fuerza del destino	Mexico
Sestre	Cuando me enamoro	Mexico
Dvostruki život	Dos Hogares	Mexico
Zabranjena ljubav	El Clon	Colombia, United States
Kraljica juga	La Reina del Sur	Colombia, United States
Trijumf ljubavi	Triunfo del Amor	Mexico
Tereza	Teresa	Mexico
Pali anđeo	Más Sabe el Diablo	United States
More ljubavi	Mar de Amor	Mexico
Valentina	Soy tu dueña	Mexico
Lola	Bella Calamidades	Colombia, United States
Danijela	Daniela	Mexico, United States
Grešne duše	Mi Pecado	Mexico
Magična privlačnost	Sortilegio	Mexico
Ljubav je večna	Mañana es para siempre	Mexico
Anali	El Rostro de Analía	United States
Izdaja	La traición	Colombia, United States
Napušteni anđeo	Cuidado con el ángel	Mexico
Zauvek zaljubljeni	Juro que te amo	Mexico
Vrela krv	Fuego en la sangre	Mexico
Zoro	El Zorro, la espada y la rosa	Colombia, United States
Prokleta lepota	Al diablo con los guapos	Mexico
Oluja	Tormenta en el paraíso	Mexico
Strasti	Pasión	Mexico
Opijeni ljubavlju	Destilando amor	Mexico
Marina	Marina	Mexico, United States
Valerija	Tierra de Pasiones	United States
Ružna Leti	La Fea Mas Bella	Mexico
Beštije	Mundo de Fieras	Mexico
Slomljeno srce	Heridas de amor	Mexico
Peregrina	Peregrina	Mexico
Alborada	Alborada	Mexico
Luna	Luna, la heredera	Colombia
Oluja strasti	La Tormenta	Colombia, United States
Zamka ljubavi	Bajo la misma piel	Mexico
Usprkos svemu	Contra Viento y Marea	Mexico
Virhinija	La esposa virgen	Mexico
Zatočenica ljubavi	Prisionera	Colombia, United States
Skrivene strasti	Pasión de Gavilanes	Colombia, United States
Srce u plamenu	Mujer de Madera	Mexico
Maćeha	La Madrastra	Mexico
Nevina	Inocente de Ti	Mexico
Paulina	La usurpadora	Mexico
Ljubav je kocka	Apuesta por un amor	Mexico
Rubi	Rubi	Mexico
Prava ljubav	Amor Real	Mexico
Staze ljubavi	Las vías del amor	Mexico
Između ljubavi i mržnje	Entre el amor y el odio	Mexico
Marijana	Mariana de la noche	Mexico
Zakon ljubavi	Zakon ljubavi	Croatia
Ponos Ratkajevih	Ponos Ratkajevih	Croatia
Obični ljudi	Obični ljudi	Croatia
Ljubav u zaleđu	Ljubav u zaleđu	Croatia
Vila Maria	Vila Maria	Croatia
