= Alpac Capital =

Portuguese Firm

- Type: Private company
- Industry: Financial services
- Founded: 2013; 13 years ago
- Headquarters: Lisbon, Portugal
- Key people: Pedro Vargas David, Luis Santos
- Products: Investment funds
- Website: alpaccapital.com

Alpac Capital is a Portuguese investment group, founded in 2013, which manages three investment funds: a technology fund, a telecom fund and a media fund. It is headquartered in Lisbon.

== History ==
Alpac Capital was founded in 2013. Besides its global headquarters in Lisbon, the firm also has regional offices in Budapest and Dubai.

Alpac Capital's CEO Pedro Vargas David, is well established in the government of Hungarian PM Viktor Orbán and is the son of Mario David, one of Orbán's advisers. Due to Orbán's repeated media violations, where he influences media regulators to punish any and all journalists who negatively report on his or his government's actions, Alpac Capital's purchase of Euronews from Naguib Sawiris was put under increased scrutiny as an attempt by Orbán to influence wider European politics.

On April 18, 2024, the International Federation of Journalists called for a European parliamentary inquiry into the Hungarian government's influence over Euronews via Alpac Capital due to Euronews attempting to influence the 2024 European Parliament election.

On May 31, 2024, Alpac Capital was fined €100,000 by the Portuguese Securities Market Commission for failing to prevent money laundering and terrorist financing. The specific charges were failures to comply with the obligation to obtain customer identification data, to obtain counterparty identification data in various respects, to assess the quality of beneficiaries, to adopt additional due diligence procedures, to take enhanced measures about the customer and the counterparty, and to notify the termination of the duties of the person responsible for compliance and to replace that person.

In May 2026 the United Group reached an agreement with Alpac Capital to sell Adria News Network. The sale was completed on August 17, 2026.

== Funds ==
Alpacs main funds are:

- A Tech Fund – East West EuVECA Fund with 6 invested companies (Dreamshaper, Codevision, Biometrid, Login, TC2) and one divested company (Petapilot).
- A Telecom Fund – Luso Pannon EuVECA Fund, with a qualified minority stake in the telecom conglomerate 4iG.
- A Media Fund – Future Media EuVECA Fund which controls 98% of Euronews. In December 2021, Alpac Capital signed an agreement to buy the controlling stake in Lyon-based broadcaster Euronews from Egyptian telecoms magnate Naguib Sawiris.

Besides the above-mentioned Funds, the Managing Partners of Alpac Capital also own interests in Renewable Solar Energy (Luz.ON) and Media (Newsplex.SA).

== Key people ==
Alpac Capital has two Founding and Managing Partners: Pedro Vargas David and Luis Santos.

Pedro Vargas David, CEO, was also Former Head of Strategy of Jerónimo Martins and holds an MBA from Insead and Executive education from Harvard Kennedy School and Harvard Business School. Luis Santos, who worked at Mckinsey for 9 years, in Europe, South America and Asia, holds an MBA from Columbia University and a PhD on Political Science and International Relations from Universidade Católica Portuguesa. Pedro is son of former Secretary of State of Portugal and former MEP in the European Union, Mário David.

Luis Santos is the son of Portuguese football coach Fernando Santos, who won the 2016 UEFA European Championship and the 2019 UEFA Nations League. His girlfriend, Isabel Figueira, is a well-known Portuguese actress and TV presenter.
