= Gru discography =

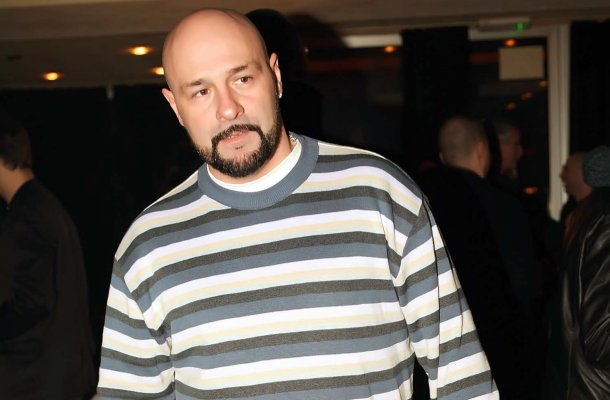
- Andonov in 2009.
- Studio albums: 4
- Compilation albums: 2
- Singles: 8

The discography of Serbian recording artist and producer Gru contains 5 studio albums, 2 compilation albums and 8 singles and EP's. He debuted on the Serbian music scene in 1995 with his debut album Da li imaš pravo?, produced by Jugodisk, but rose to prominence with his 1996 release Gru 2, which became the most commercially successful album in Serbia to date, selling 4 million copies. All of his singles discography include vocals from featured artists, and it's featured in the documentary done as a collective work with other hip-hop vocalists titled Stani na put. Despite that, he wrote, produced and arranged most of the songs featured in his discography. His first compilation album retains songs from his Između redova album, whereas Andonov's second released compilation album, The Ultimate Collection, contains his most critically acclaimed work.

== Albums ==
Year	Album details
1995	Da li imaš pravo?: Language: Serbian; Released: 1995; Label: Jugodisk; Formats: Cassette, CD, digital download
1996	Gru2: Language: Serbian; Released: 1996; Label: Komuna; Formats: Cassette, CD, digital download
1999	Vetrenjače: Language: Serbian; Released: 1999; Label: CentroScena; Formats: Cassette, CD, digital download
2003	Beogard: Language: Serbian; Released: 2003; Label: City Records, Komuna; Formats: Cassette, CD

== Singles ==
Year	Song	Featuring
1995	"Da li imaš pravo?"	Enco
1996	"Biću tu"	Leontina Vukmanović
2010	"I dalje me žele"	Ajs Nigrutin
2011	"Ti to zoveš ljubav"	Marko Kon, Niggor
2014	"Samo za tvoje oči"	Sky Wikluh
2014	"Dugme po dugme"	Stefan Đurić Rasta
2015	"Novo leto"	Kurtoazija, Juice
2015	"Biću tu (20 godina kasnije)"	Gazda Paja
2016	"Kilo koke"	Vojke Djans
2017	"Plan B"	THCF, DJ Playa

== Compilation albums ==
Year	Album details
1995-2002	Između redova: Language: Serbian; Released: 2002; Label: Jugodisk, Avalon; Formats: Cassette, CD, digital download
2009	The Ultimate Collection: Language: Serbian; Released: 2009; Label: Komuna, City Records; Formats: Cassette, CD, digital download

== See also ==
- Music of Serbia
- Serbian hip hop
