= Gru 2 =

Studio album by Gru
- Released: 1996
- Recorded: January – December 1995
- Genre: Funk, hip hop
- Length: 39:20
- Label: Jugodisk, Komuna
- Producer: Srđan Babović, Dalibor Andonov Gru

Gru chronology
Da li imaš pravo? (1995)	Gru 2 (1996)	Vetrenjače (1999)

Gru 2 is the second studio album published by Serbian recording artist Gru. Gru 2 remains Gru's most critically acclaimed album, and it is considered the most commercially successful album in Serbia to date, selling 4 million copies, and certified gold in Serbia.

Gru 2 included songs with a wide range of themes, from emotional ballads (Dosta mi je svega) to gangster anthems (Srce). The album was produced by producer Srđan Babović and Dalibor Andonov, on behalf of the label Komuna, and it was recorded at Studio Puž. Other than the success of Biću tu, chart-topping hits generated from the album include Leto, Srce, Petak, Čovek je čoveku vuk and Dosta mi je svega.

== Track listing ==
No.	Title	Lyrics	Music	Length
1.	"Leto" ("Summer")	D. Andonov, L. Vukomanović	D. Andonov, I. Lazić	3:32
2.	"Biću tu" ("I'll Be There")	D. Andonov, L. Vukomanović	D. Andonov, E. Laković	3:24
3.	"Srce" ("Heart")	D. Andonov	N. Jovanović, Đ. Miljenović	3:58
4.	"Petak" ("Friday")	D. Andonov, M. Kon	D. Andonov, M. Kon	3:46
5.	"Petak (Out)" ("Friday (Out)")	D. Andonov	D. Andonov	1:17
6.	"Kada završi se dan" ("When The Day Ends")	D. Andonov, M. Kon	D. Andonov, M. Kon	4:02
7.	"Čovek je čoveku vuk" ("Man is Man's Wolf")	D. Andonov	D. Andonov	3:19
8.	"Dosta mi je svega" ("I'm Sick of Everything")	D. Andonov	D. Andonov	4:17
9.	"Šampion" ("Champion")	S. Babović, D. Ivanković, D. Andonov	D. Andonov	5:07
10.	"Ja ne spadam ovde" ("I Don't Belong Here")	D. Andonov	D. Andonov	4:10
11.	"Preko (Daleko)" ("Over (Far Away)")	D. Andonov	D. Andonov	4:02

== Reception ==
Gru 2 received universal acclaim from critics. Music critic and guitarist Dragan Brajović Braja credited the album "for finding the perfect balance of underground and commercialisation". Stanislav Nušić stated the album is "Gru's magnum opus and quite possibly one of the greatest Serbian-language hip-hop albums of all time." Danilo Milivojević called the album "a turning point in Serbian culture, which the Serbian rap scene needed".

== Accolades ==
The album was polled number 1 on Kurir's list of the "Top 10 Best Albums of 1996". The album was polled at number 25 on Dragan Marinković's list of the "Top 50 Greatest Serbian Albums", the highest rap album on the list. The song Srce won Andonov a World Music Award.

== See also ==
- Music of Serbia
- Serbian hip hop
