= 2020 Music Awards Ceremony =

Balkans music awards ceremony, held in Belgrade

2nd Music Awards Ceremony
- Date: 27 January 2020
- Venue: Štark Arena - Belgrade, Serbia
- Hosted by: Galeb Nikačević; Tamara Todevska; Ana Radišić
- Most awards: Senidah (2)
- Most nominations: Senidah (3)

Television/radio coverage
- Network: TV Pink (Serbia); RTL (Croatia); FTV (Federation B&H); RTRS (Republika Srpska); TV3 Slovenia (Slovenia); Kanal 5 (North Macedonia); RTCG (Montenegro); YouTube
- Runtime: Five hours

The 2020 Music Awards Ceremony was held on 27 January 2020 at the Štark Arena in Belgrade. It was the second edition of Sky Music's annual award ceremony to recognize achievements in the regional music industry of former Yugoslavia for the eligibility year, which ran from January 1, 2018 to August 30, 2019. The event was hosted by Serbian presenter Galeb Nikačević, Macedonian singer Tamara Todevska and Croatian presenter Ana Radišić.

Part of the income was donated to UNICEF's gender equality programs in the west Balkans.

== Performances ==
List of performances
Artist(s)	Song(s)
Magnifico	"Samo malo"
Nina Badrić	"Rekao si"
Oliver Mandić	"Odlazim, a volim te"
Senidah	"Mišići"
Lepa Brena	"Uđi slobodno" "Hajde da se volimo" "Duge noge" "Jugoslovenka"
Bane MVP; Tijana Dapčević; Aleksandar Džankić; Kiza Robin Hood; Marko Louis; DJ Munja; Niggor; Ivana Peters; Viktor Savić; Smoke Mardeljano; Maja Stojanović Louis	Tribute to Gru "Biću tu"
Jelena Rozga	"Sveto pismo"
Jala Brat; Buba Corelli	"99" "Balenciaga" "Bebi"
Who See	"Đe se kupaš"
Kaliopi	"Rođeni"
S.A.R.S.	"Veruj mi"
Ilda Šaulić	Tribute to Šaban Šaulić "Žal"
Nevena Božović	"Jasno mi je/Dangerous Drug" "Kruna"
Balkanopolis	"Voda"
Tonči Huljić	"Dva puta sam umra"
Sara Jo	"Mili, mili" "Bez sna"
Aleksandra Radović	"Živeo kraj"

== Categories and winners ==
Winners are listed first and are highlighted bold.

=== Public vote-based categories ===
Female Pop Song of the Year	Male Pop Song of the Year
Lena Kovačević – Dubine; Nina Badrić – Rekao si; Emina Jahović – Vukovi; Jelena Rozga – Proljeće; Antonia Gigovska – Nikogaš, ne veli nikogaš	Petar Grašo – Voli me; Ivan Zak – Sama; Dženan Lončarević – Čuvam ti krila anđele; Željko Joksimović – Možda je to ljubav; Amel Ćurić – Niko; Saša Kovačević – Prevarena
Band Pop Song of the Year	Pop Collaboration of the Year
Magla bend – Teatralno; Crvena jabuka – Pijane noći; Ljubavnici – Jedna jedina; Modrijani – Sreča je v naju; Učiteljice – Na usnama	Sergej Ćetković feat. Who See – Pusti probleme; Mia feat. Marko Tolja – Sva blaga ovog svijeta; Danijela Karić feat. Elena Risteska – Srca se pogreše; Guru Hare feat. Aki Rahimovski – Majko; Danijela Martinović feat. Jole – Na granici
Rock Song of the Year	Pop-Rock Song of the Year
Van Gogh – Više te ne volim ko pre; Divlje jagode – Zbog tebe draga; Majke – Zašto; Obojeni program – Umeš li da upravljaš sa vremenom; Siddharta - Jaz	Parni Valjak – Otkud ti pravo; Ana Stanić – Holivud; Antonio Perina – Balerina; Bombaj Štampa – Samo lagano; S.A.R.S. - Duše nemaš; Van Gogh – Više te ne volim ko pre
Folk Song of the Year	Pop-Folk Song of the Year
Aleksandra Prijović – Bogata sirotinja; Amar Gile – Nek to budem ja; Darko Lazić – Majko; Dženan Lončarević – Ako pitaš; Kija – Amorova strela; Milica Todorović feat. Mirza Selimović – Avet	Lozano – Majko; Antonija Šola – Oči boje oceana; Ilma Karahmet – Ništa tvoje; Lexington bend – Venama; Nataša Bekvalac feat. Magla bend – Neprijatelj
World Music Song of the Year	Alternative Pop Song of the Year
S.A.R.S. – Ruke; Brkovi – Hoću da dijete sluša narodnjake; Del Arno Band – Izleči me; Gabi Novak – Neko čeka na tebe; Next Time – Nešto ke te pitam babo; The Frajle – Zlato	Buč Kesidi – Nema ljubavi u klubu; BQL – Peru; Duper – Nie sme 2; Sajsi MC – Meni se ne udaje; Sara Jo – Mili, mili; Senidah – Crno srce
Trap Song of the Year	Trap Collaboration of the Year
Senidah – Mišići; Coby – Biseri iz blata; DNK – Gore ili dole; Inas – Da da da; Jala Brat – 99; MIC MC – Duh	Jelena Karleuša feat. Gazda Paja – LaJK; Jala Brat and Buba Corelli feat. Coby – O.D.D.D.; Corona and Rimski – Crne kiše; MC Yankoo feat. Cvija – Ista si ko sve; Relja feat. Nikolija – Meduza
Hip-Hop/Rap Song of the Year	Cover Song of the Year
Smoke Mardeljano – Hvala Hip hop; Bad Copy – Prazan disko; Baka Prase – Ono moje; Jala Brat & Buba Corelli feat. RAF Camora – Zove Vienna; Klinac – U sumrak/Svetlo; Slatkaristika feat. 2Bona – Dijamanti	The Frajle feat. Tijana Dapčević – Negativ; Aurora – Program tvog kompjutera; Bojana Vunturišević – Full Control; Marko Louis – Rockabye; Saša Matić – A ja imam tebe
Music Video of the Year	Concert of the Year
Nataša Bekvalac – Dođi mami; Sara Jo – Bez sna; Franka – Ljubav, ništa više; Jacques Houdek – Voli do boli; Senidah – Mišići; Laibach – The Coming Race	Marija Šerifović – Druga strana ploče; Sava Centar; 2Cellos - Arena Boris Trajkovski; Kaliopi - Sava Centar; Lepa Brena - Štark Arena; Maya Berović - Pravo vreme; Štark Arena; Tony Cetinski - Tašmajdan
Breakthrough Act	YouTube Star
Angellina - Pile moje; Breskvica - Utopia; D mol - Heaven; Dina Leško - Sve je iluzija; Luna Djo - Deveti krug; Nera Mamić - Alamo	Voyage feat. Breskvica - Vrati me; Klinac - U sumrak/Svetla; Anđela & Nađa - Propušten poziv; Bake - Broj; Braco Gajić feat. Andrija Jo - Niđe veze; Barbi Afrika feat. SKANKDAFAKA - Ne javljam

=== Other awards ===
Male Artist of the Year	Female Artist of the Year
Saša Matić	Nina Badrić
Musical Impact	Career Achievement
Jala Brat and Buba Corelli	Oliver Mandić
Contribution to Regional Music	Contribution to Folk Music
Lepa Brena	Šaban Šaulić
Golden MAC for Authenticity
Senidah
