= Who See =

Montenegrin hip-hop duo

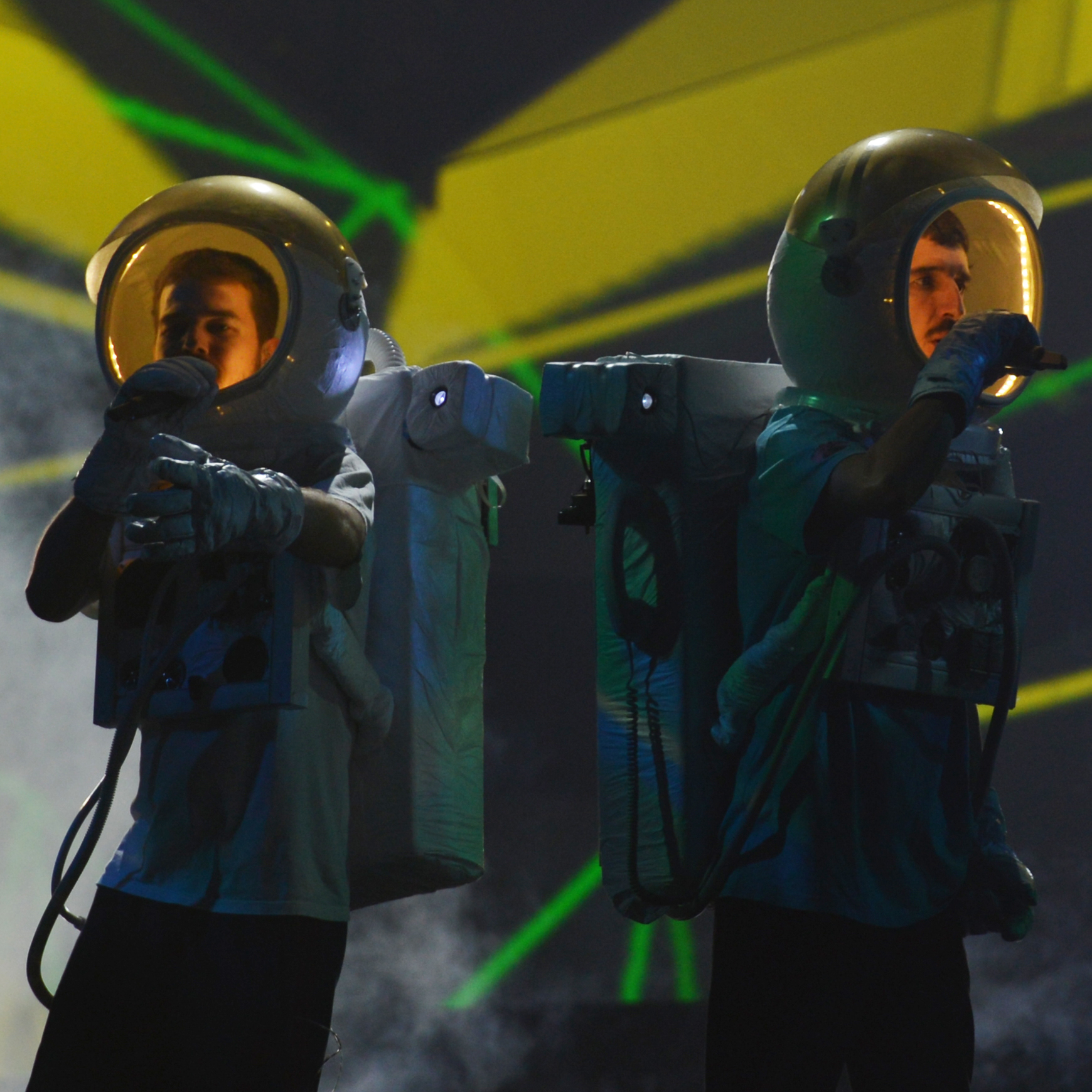
- Noyz (left) and Dedduh at rehearsal for Eurovision 2013

Background information
- Also known as: Who See klapa
- Origin: Kotor, Montenegro
- Genres: Hip-hop, Underground hip hop
- Years active: 2002–present
- Label: Lampshade Media
- Members: Dedduh (Dejan Dedović); Noyz (Mario Đorđević)

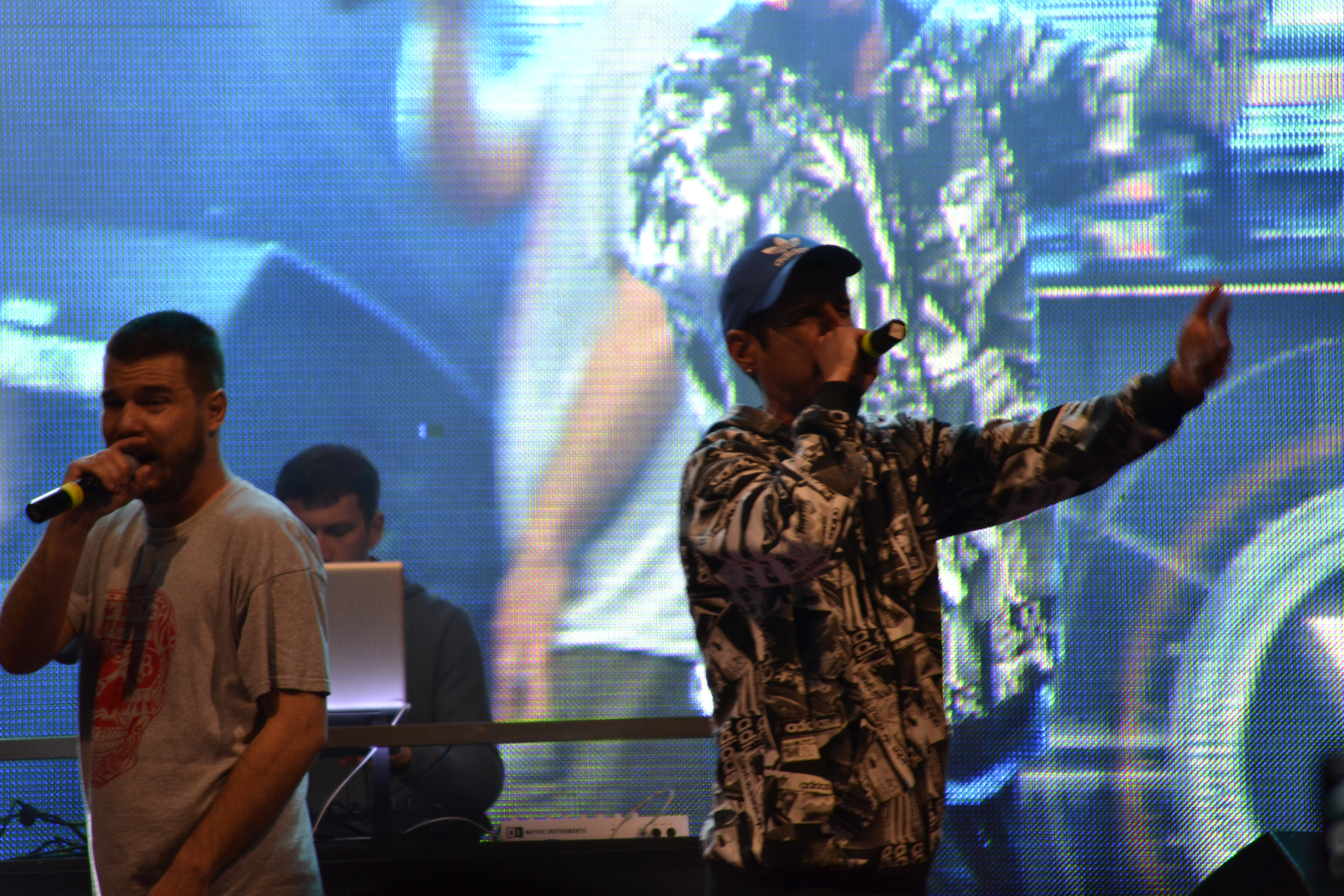
Performance in Budva, 2 May 2015

Who See (also referred to as Who See? and Who See Klapa) is a Montenegrin hip-hop duo from Kotor. Its members are Dedduh or Deda (Dejan Dedović), from Kotor, and Noyz (Mario Đorđević), from Herceg Novi. The group was created in the early 2000s, recording their first demo track titled "Dim po dim" ("Puff after puff"). Noyz and Dedduh had guest appearances on Serbian hip-hop compilation "Ulice vol.1", and Sve same barabe, an album by 43Zla. In 2007, the group released their debut album, Sviranje kupcu. Among the guests on the album there are Bad Copy, Škabo from Beogradski Sindikat, Hornsman Coyote from Eyesburn and Rhino, a producer and MC from Podgorica. He authored some of the beats on the album and was the executive producer on all the tracks.

Who See also collaborated with various artists, recording tracks with Sean Price, Ajs Nigrutin, Wikluh Sky, Prti Bee Gee, Krešo Bengalka, Kid Rađa, Frenkie, Random, Smoke Mardeljano, Kendi, Labia and fellow Eurovision alumnus Sergej Ćetković.

== Performance at Refresh Festival 2008 ==
Who See Klapa had the honour to perform as the opening act of Kotor's 2008 Refresh Festival's hip-hop category on opening day, 7 August. They opened at the hip-hop stage at the Maximus discothèque, their appearance scheduled for 00:00 (Midnight) local time. Their performance proved that it is not instant success that they have attained even outside of Montenegro's border. Their performance also successfully paved for their colleague, Serbian rapper Marčelo's, performance, which was due an hour after Who See?'s performance.

== Solo works ==
In their free time, Dedduh and Noyz have worked on their own solo works. Dedduh recorded a single called "Kakav ćemo refren?" ("What kind of chorus [do we want]?), featuring Serbian rapper Ajs Nigrutin. Meanwhile, Noyz recorded "Niđe hedova masnija", featuring Ajs Nigrutin and Timbe.

== Eurovision Song Contest 2013 ==
After winning MTV Adria award for Best regional Act RTCG announced in December 2012 that Who See would represent Montenegro in the Eurovision Song Contest 2013 held in Malmö. Their entry was the song "Igranka" with additional vocals by singer Nina Žižić. The song was performed as part of the first semi-final heat on Tuesday 14 May 2013 and failed to advance to the finals.

== Albums ==
- Sviranje kupcu (2007)
- Krš i drača (2012)
- Nemam ti kad (2014)
- Pamidore (2017)

== Awards and nominations ==
Year	Award	Category	Nominee(s)	Result	Ref.
2012	MTV Europe Music Awards	Best Adria Act	Who See	Won	
2014	MTV Europe Music Awards	Best Adria Act	Who See	Nominated	
2020	Music Awards Ceremony	Pop Collaboration of the Year	"Pusti probleme" (with Sergej Ćetković)	Won	

Awards and achievements
Preceded by Rambo Amadeus with "Euro Neuro"	Montenegro in the Eurovision Song Contest; 2013	Succeeded by Sergej Ćetković with "Moj svijet"
