= Gru (rapper) =

Serbian musician (1973–2019)

- Гру
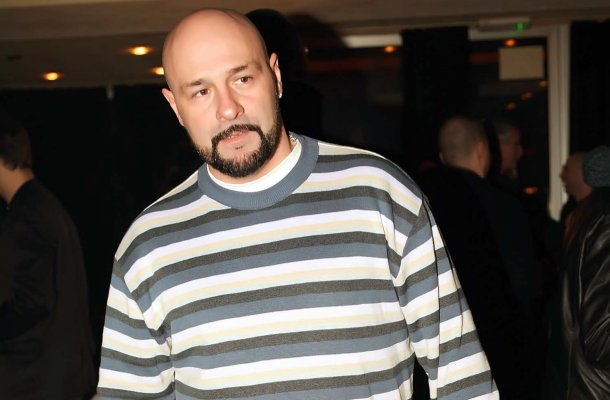
- Gru at the Ultimate Collection promotion in 2009.
- Born: Dalibor Andonov; 8 March 1973; Dimitrovgrad, SR Serbia, SFR Yugoslavia
- Died: 9 September 2019 (aged 46); Zemun, Serbia
- Occupations: Musician; DJ; rapper; producer; television personality; actor
- Years active: 1990–2019
- Spouse: Danica Prvulović
- Children: 2
- Musical career
- Genres: Hip hop; Funk; Eurodance
- Instruments: Vocals; Guitar; Drums; Bass Guitar; Keyboards
- Labels: Komuna; City Records; Avalon; Jugodisk

Dalibor Andonov (Serbian Cyrillic: Далибор Андонов, pronounced [dǎliboːr andǒnov]; 8 March 1973 – 9 September 2019), known professionally as Gru, was a Serbian musician, DJ, rapper and actor. His song Biću tu from the 1996 album Gru 2, gained him popularity in Eastern Europe, as well as the 2010 release I dalje me žele alongside Serbian rapper Ajs Nigrutin. His album Gru 2 is the most commercially successful album in Serbia, selling four million copies, and reaching certified gold status in Serbia. Other than his immense popularity in the Balkans, he is well known in other countries of Eastern and Northern Europe. He has been dubbed The Serbian Rap Machine.

A native of Dimitrovgrad, Andonov started his career in Belgrade, with his earliest demos in 1994, but rose to prominence with his music work in early 1996. Marking the first wave of Serbian hip hop with his debut album Da li imaš pravo?, Andonov produced five albums as a solo artist, out of which four reached gold and platinum status in Serbia. The albums included critically and commercially acclaimed songs that topped the Balkan charts, including Srce, Biću tu, Kad se popnem na binu, Kiša, and Da li imaš pravo?, winning him three Serbian Oscars of Popularity, an Indexi Award and a World Music Award. The songs were noted as traditional hip-hop compositions with elements of funk and soul. Since Beograd in 2003, Andonov has stepped down from making albums and has been producing singles. His more recent work incorporates radio friendly melodies, which embarked commercial success, including I dalje me žele, Plan B, Kilo koke and Biću tu (20 godina kasnije), winning an Index Award, an Oscar of Popularity and an MTV Platinum Award.

Andonov also had done work for television and film, including appearances in Operacija trijumf, Veliki Brat VIP All Stars and Tvoje lice zvuči poznato. He made his film debut in 1997 as Vanja in Land of Truth, Love & Freedom, and actively composed films, including Undisputed II: Last Man Standing and Dorćol-Manhattan. He died on 9 September 2019, following a kite-surfing accident.

== Early life ==
Andonov attended trade school in Pančevo. During his education, he avidly played football and basketball. In 1988, his cousin living in Sweden gave him a Straight Outta Compton album by N.W.A., which he cites as his most important possession from his earlier years. After high school, he went to study business, but never finished due to his love of music. After, he had moved to Belgrade, where he began to produce music and MC. Soon he became skilled at DJing, beginning to MC in the early nineties. His DJing style resembled the one of Nigerian-Swedish recording artist Dr. Alban, which he idolised at the time. Andonov chose the stage name Gru, from the music term which senses propulsive rhythmic feel or dynamics, groove.

== Career ==
=== 1994–1999: Debut album and Gru 2 (Biću tu, Srce) ===
Andonov began his career in 1990 as a founding member in the Yugoslav recording act Project 6, which disbanded in 1993. His first demo recording as a vocal soloist was produced in 1994, although his first public releases date back to 1995, with the album Da li imaš pravo? (Do You Have The Right?) which marked the beginning of the first wave of Serbian hip hop. His debut album was recorded at Studio Jugodisk and Studio Avalon from 24 October until 10 December 1994, although it was released a year after. In the first recording he collaborated with Enco, who was featured only in that recording, more specifically in the sequence Život je lep (Life is beautiful).

Andonov published the album Gru 2 in October 1996, and it gained him notoriety in the Balkan countries, becoming the most commercially successful album in Serbia to date, selling 4 million copies, which holds the record as the best-selling album in Balkan history. The songs in the album included emotional ballads (Dosta mi je svega/Poludecu) and gangster anthems (Srce). Gru 2 contains the most songs done as alliances with other Serbian musicians of all his albums. These include Leto (Summer), with Leontina Vukomanović and U-Stuff, Srce (Heart) with Leontina Vukomanović and Nenad Jovanović, Dosta mi je svega/Poludecu (I'm Done With Everything/I'm Going Crazy) with Srđan Babović and Dejan Ivanković, Čovek je čoveku vuk (A Man is a Man's Wolf) with CYA and ILaLa, Petak (Friday) with Bojan Todorov and Coca, and Biću tu with Niggor of the Monteniggers. All songs featured lyrics and music arranged by Andonov, with guitar playing done by Voja Aralica, and co-writing done by Dejan Ivanković Betoven, who was a guest vocalist on Dosta mi je svega/Poludecu. The album was produced by producer Srđan Babović, on behalf of the label Komuna. Gru 2 was recorded at Studio Puž.

The track Biću tu (I'll Be There) from the album, became his signature song, and became an evergreen Serbian rap song, incorporating elements of soul and funk, into hip-hop and rap. A song heavily hinted by prostitution, Biću tu was accompanied by a music video that was controversial due to provocative content. The song was also credited by Dragan Brajović Braja to have found the balance between commercialisation and underground. The Gru 2 album earned him two Serbian Oscars of Popularity, one for the album itself, and one for the single. The song Srce won Andonov a World Music Award in 1997 in category of Best Hip-hop Singles.

In 1999, he helped produce the Full Moon and Monteniggers single Ja se vraćam u svoj hram which his chorus melody is the foundation for the song Samo sex Srbina spasava. He won the Serbian Oscar of Popularity for Best Concert, premiering the album Vetrenjače (Windmills). Windmills also gained the honorific title as certified gold in Serbia, claimed in 2000. Songs from the album merged hip hop with swing, which was another autochthon creation in Serbian music done by Gru. He toured Eastern Europe in 1999.

=== 2000–2006: Između redova, Beogard ===
In 2000, Metropolis Records published a rendition of his debut album Da li imaš pravo 5 years after the original issue, on CD. The rendition included various guests, including Serbian music producer Marko Kon, hip-hop group CYA, rapper Đorđe Radivojević Ramirez (ex Sunshine), Bojan Todorov and Vladimir Ilić. He also had his film debut in Land of Truth, Love & Freedom as Petar Peca, and composed the soundtrack for Dorcol-Manhattan. In 2004, he starred in the Serbian dub for Shrek as Lord Farquaad, alongside Nebojša Glogovac as Shrek, Anica Dobra as Princess Fiona and Radovan Vujović as Donkey.

In 2002, he released the album Između redova (Between the Lines), on which he had worked on for 7 years with the label City Records, since 1995 until 2002. The song MF "Gru – Ko Je Gru?" (MF Gru – Who is Gru?), went in a new direction, as it interpreted the musical style of eurodance. Biću tu was released again on the album due to the popularity it generated. That same year, he was invited by Prva Srpska Televizija to voice Squilliam Fancyson for the Serbian dub for SpongeBob SquarePants. He would later provide the voice of Fat Tony for the Serbian-language version of The Simpsons Movie.

In 2003, he released Beogard (a pun of the word Belgrade). Songs Doktore and Tamo gde si ti featured guest vocals from Mario Jovanović from the band Rhythm Attack and from Bane Danilović from Who Is The Best. The same year, he was featured on Marchelo's album De Facto, more specifically the song Bolji život (Better life), where Marchelo provided guest vocals. Beogard also featured the chart-topping Stara škola, nova škola, which was done as a collective work with rappers Juice, Shorty, Sky Wikluh and MC Drejz. He was Don Trialeon's guest star in Trialeon's radio show Škola alongside The Jungle Brothers, Sole, Coolio and RZA of The Wu Tang Clan.

In 2004, he re-recorded Kiša (Rain), from his 2003 album Beogard. The 2004 version included vocals provided by Macedonian recording artist Tijana Dapčević. He provided the voice for Anchor for the Serbian Finding Nemo, starring Branislav Platiša and Anica Dobra and acted in the documentary Poslednja Nova Godina that same year. In 2006, he co-wrote the soundtrack and composed Adrenaline Junkie for the American film Undisputed II: Last Man Standing. He went on an international tour in June 2006, having shows in Australia, The United Kingdom, South Africa, the United States, and France.

=== 2007–2010: The Ultimate Collection, television projects ===
From 2007 to 2010, Andonov primarily started DJing. In an interview, he stated that he didn't produce music, but did DJ and perform. He did an international tour in 2009, rapping in Canada, Scandinavia and (Germany). He announced that he helped produced the Nisam Ljubomoran (I'm Not Jealous) single by Montenegrin-born singer Vlado Georgiev in his Georgiev's recording studio Barba in 2005.

In 2009 City Records launched The Ultimate Collection, which was composed out of his most popular songs at the time. Songs Pravo u raj, Srce and Over reached number 1 on the Serbian Prva Charts after the second publishing. Adrenaline Junkie and Nebo ispod zemlje were published as renditions due to the refreshed motives of RnB and Swing music.

By the end of 2009, Andonov had cut ties with the Serbian record label City Records who had done production for his both compilation albums.

Andonov was a contestant in the third version of the Serbian version of Big Brother, titled Veliki Brat. He participated in the All Stars version, and reached second place as a finalist. He also took part in the seventh gala for Operacija trijumf, alongside Croatian musician Dado Topić, American pop artist Anastacia, and Macedonian vocalist Kaliopi on 10 November. At the time, when the four artists formed the seventh gala, Mirjana Kostić and Kristijan Jovanov were expelled, while contestants Adnan Babajić and Milica Majstorović were nominated. Later, he helped produce the song "Bistra voda" for Mirjana Kostić and performed shows alongside her.

=== 2010–2014: I dalje me žele, Dugme po dugme, Biću tu (20 godina kasnije) ===
In 2010, Andonov alongside Serbian rapper Ajs Nigrutin released I dalje me žele (They Still Want Me) as a hip hop duet. The rap song had similar motives as Biću tu. The song achieved numerous accolades, including "The Number One Best Rap Song of 2010" by Kurir and the "Number One Best Hip-Hop Songs of the Last Decade" by Blic. It also spawned numerous covers of varying Your Face Sounds Familiar adaptations. He voiced Minion in the Serbian dub of Megamind, alongside Dragan Mićanović, who dubbed Megamind, and appeared in two episodes of Ulica lipa, as the fictional Leskovac native Branislav Savić.

In 2011, he produced Idemo na sve by Serbian singer Ana Kokić and Romanian recording artist Costi Ioniță, which went on to top the charts in December 2011. In 2011, he won the Indexi Award for his collaboration with Ajs Nigrutin.

In May 2012, he performed with Bosnian-born rapper Edo Maajka in Dom Mladih in Sarajevo, on behalf of Maajka's Štrajk mozga album tour. The same year, Andonov toured the US for 3 months, performing in Carnegie Hall in New York City, and in Troubadour in West Hollywood, California, and later returned to DJ in his native Dimitrovgrad.

In early 2013, he landed a role as the dub for Dr. Blowhole in the Nickelodeon-based animated TV show Penguins of Madagascar. In late 2013, it was revealed that Andonov collaborated with Marchelo and his crew on a new book-album titled Napet Šou (Tense Show), which was published in October 2014. The album is composed of 18 tracks which were recorded with contribution from over 30 artists, which included Andonov. Gru collaborated with Juice and Napoleon on the track Šta da radim sad (What Do I Do Now). Andonov produced instrumentals for the entire Tvoje lice zvuči poznato franchise. He performed with choreographer Aleksa Rafiović Zile and the dance crew an ABBA medley, in the final episode of the first season.

In 2014, Andonov collaborated with recording artist and producer Stefan Đurić Rasta for the track Dugme po dugme (Button per button). The single had elements of trap music and Serbian turbo-folk. Andonov also published the EP Samo za tvoje oči (Only for Your Eyes), alongside the collaboration. The single also attributed vocals from Sky Wikluh. He toured Asia in October 2014, and performed and MC-ed in the Philippines, Japan, Thailand, Vietnam and Cambodia. In December 2014, he performed Merry Christmas Everyone as Shakin' Stevens for the second season of Tvoje lice zvuči poznato, for which he had done instrumentals. Andonov performed in the final episode it with the contestants to close to show.

=== 2014–2019: Novo leto, Plan B, Nebrušen dijamant ===
In 2015, Gru was featured on the single Novo leto alongside Belgrade-based hip hop project Kurtoazija, fronted by vocalist MC Stojan. The single was considered a summer hit because of the vast fame it amassed. Andonov released a refreshed version of Biću tu, titled Biću tu (20 godina kasnije) (I'll be there / 20 years later), alongside Serbian rapper Gazda Paja. The song itself featured production from his own studio, but also the Serbian record label IDJ videos, which lasted for 6 years. Gru published the variation on 22 August 2015. Unlike the original which incorporated elements of old-school funk, the 2015 release blended the worlds of hip-hop and turbo-folk and pop music in order to appeal to modern listeners. The music video, produced by IDJ Videos, had featured guest stars similar to the ones in the 1996 video of Andonov's Biću tu, such as the Cindy models and Niggor of The Monteniggers. Kilo koke (Kilogram of Chicken) was another single by Gru released a year later, 2016, which featured rapper Vojke Djans. Kilo koke, due to its repetitive lyrics and overused beat didn't amass success as much as the rendition of his most popular song, but it was still an acclaimed club song which received radio play. Celebrating the new hits, Andonov toured Eastern Europe, and later performed in Sweden, sponsored by Absolut Vodka. In May 2016, he performed Più Bella Cosa as Eros Ramazzotti for the final episode of the third season of Tvoje lice zvuči poznato.

In April 2017, Andonov did a charitable concert in Zagreb with Edo Maajka. In May 2017, collectively the Serbian rap music act THCF, Deejay Playa and Gru recorded Plan B, which gained the honorific title as the Serbian song of the year. The same year Biću tu was interpreted yet again in the Albanian version of Your Face Sounds Familiar. It was sung by Albanian vocalist Flaka Krelani in the fourth episode, which landed her 2nd place in the episode. The performance was also reprised in the final, when Marjana Bombaz and Xum Allushi performed I dalje me žele as Nigrutin and Gru to close the show. In September 2017, Andonov did a concert for Grey Goose Vodka in River Club Belgrade, attended by over 20,000 people. In November 2017, Andonov released a medley single, which incorporated Biću tu, I dalje me žele, Srce, Putnik, Kiša, Ozbiljna veza, Čovek je čoveku vuk, Pravo u raj, Skit, Dugme po dugme and Doktore in that order. Andonov stated that the mixture embraced every single aspect of his career. Earlier that year, he purchased a tropic bar in Boracay, Philippines.

In early 2018, Andonov did advertising for Gorki List and Jameson Irish Whiskey (for which he later did a promotional concert in Vranje). In mid 2018, he toured Africa and stayed in Egypt for a brief period, performing. Later that month, he recorded with Serbian-born vocalist Baba Khan Nebrušen dijamant (Unbrushed Diamond). The song's music video was directed by Milan Stanković, on behalf of IDJ Videos, and was released on 2 September 2018. Nebrušen dijamant was filmed in Herceg Novi, Montenegro, and recorded in Belgrade, Serbia.

In January 2019, Gru had taken part in the Abarth VIP race by Petrol, alongside various Serbian media personalities, including Dragana Mićalović, Hristina Popović and Sara Jovanović. He completed second place out of ten, finishing the race at 54 seconds. He was the runner up after Uroš Čertić.

== Artistry ==
=== Musical style ===
Though he did not shine in the area of vocal style, being a baritone, he excelled in the field of musicianship, either as a music producer and as a multi-instrumentalist, and in the art of rapping. Andonov was largely a self-taught musician, who learned basic chord progressions by ear. He was taught bass guitar by Bulgarian musician Gril Zrbnikovski, during his late teenage years.

As a music producer, Andonov was known for merging many genres into rap and hip-hop. The most popular example is arguably Biću tu (1996), which combined funk with hip-hop, but also instances with MF Gru – Ko Je Gru? (2002), which is mixed with eurodance, Komercijala (2003) and Kiša (2004), where rap meets pop, and the new singles, after his hiatus include Dugme po dugme (2014), which combines trap music, Biću tu (20 godina kasnije) (2015), which includes structures of Serbian turbo-folk. The most common music fusion by Andonov, which is his autochthon creation in Serbian rap music, is the merging of rap and funk. This can be attributed to most of his songs, most notably Biću tu, I dalje me žele, Kad se popnem na binu, Putnik and Ozbiljna veza. The Ultimate Collection from 2009 included elements of Rhythm and blues, and Swing music.

Andonov's musical abilities included playing drums, guitar, bass guitar, and keyboards.

=== Lyrical style ===
Andonov is known for his specific brand of lyrics, approaching a wide palette of themes, including Srce, which explores love, Beograd, interpreting social status, Kad se popnem na binu, elucidating fears, Biću tu, translating his feelings about hedonistic aspects of love, and Geto, which paraphrased the topic of crime.

=== Influences ===
Andonov has cited as his main influences N.W.A, Marvin Gaye, Michael Jackson, Tupac Shakur, Eminem, Dave Gahan of Depeche Mode and Maurice White of Earth Wind and Fire for musicianship, but has also cited his colleagues to be an inspiration, such as Marchelo, Sky Wikluh, Ajs Nigrutin, Juice and Škabo. His DJ influences include Dr. Alban, David Guetta, Carl Cox and Ray Slijngaard of 2 Unlimited. He has cited Straight Outta Compton as the favourite album.

=== Legacy ===
Andonov is one of the pioneers of Serbian rap music, and remains a prominent figure in the Serbian rap scene, being a main source of inspiration to the aspiring rappers in Eastern Europe, including Ajs Nigrutin; who chose the stage name Nigrutin based on Gru; Liroy, Wikluh Sky, Marchelo, Don Trialeon, MC Yankoo, Rasta and Juice. Other artists including Ana Nikolić, Coolio, Rambo Amadeus and Almir Hasanbegović of Dubioza Kolektiv have often cited Gru as an influence. Arguably, Andonov is the most successful rapper in Eastern Europe. His popularity isn't limited to the Balkan countries and Eastern Europe, as he frequently tours in Asia, Northern Africa and in the United States, selling out shows at major venues including Troubadour in the United States, The Opera House in Canada, Space Sharm in Egypt, AgeHa in Japan, and various other locations. His rapping skills proclaimed him the honorific title of the Serbian Rap Machine. Theatre and music critic Milivoj Jukić called Gru "a legendary musician of the nineties". Viktor Savić dubbed Gru "a legend of Belgrade and a moral foundation that future generations can look up to."

=== Stani na put ===
Based on Andonov's career, the 2015 documentary Stani na put was made. The film's central plot is Balkan hip-hop. It was directed by Marchelo, and filmed in Belgrade, Sarajevo and Zagreb, featuring eminent rappers from the region, including Edo Maajka, Sky Wikluh, Timbe, Ajs Nigrutin, Juice and various others.

== Personal life ==
Andonov has defined his interests and hobbies in various interviews, for Serbian news companies, which include Blic and Kurir. According to his interviews, he was an avid snowboarder and Basketball player, and enjoyed living spontaneously. He owned properties in his native Serbia, and the Philippines.

A basketball fan, Andonov was a well-known Partizan Belgrade supporter.

In 1999, Andonov started dating Serbian model Danica Prvulović. In 2006, the couple married. They had two children, Relja and Vuk.

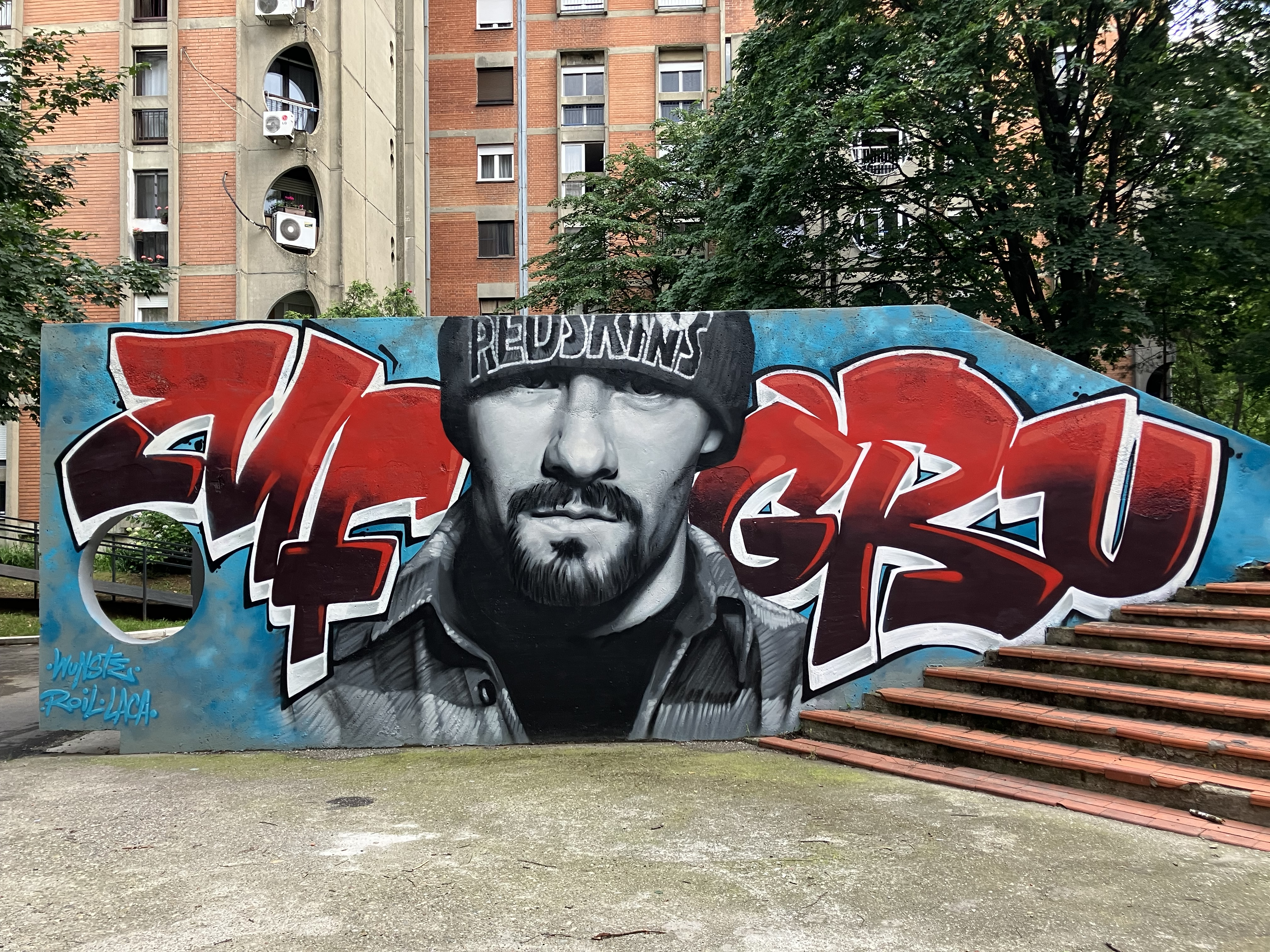
Gru mural in Belgrade, 2024

== Death ==
On September 9, 2019, Gru was kitesurfing in Zemun next to the "Nautic Club Zemun" when a gust of wind lifted him out of the water and slammed him back multiple times. It is assumed that the kite's handle hit him in the head, after which he lost consciousness and dropped into the water; the ambulance came quickly, but they could only declare him dead at around 3:20 pm.

Numerous prominent artists, including Radovan Vujović, Sergej Trifunović, Frenkie, Sky Wikluh, Nikola Rokvić and Nered expressed sorrow over Andonov's death. His funeral was held on 12 September in Orlovača.

At the 2020 Music Awards Ceremony in Serbia, over a dozen artists, including Ivana Peters and Tijana Dapčević performed Biću tu, as a tribute.

On 14 July 2020, Andonov's family and close friends conceived a tribute to the late musician Gru tu je, taking control over his Instagram and other social media outlets and releasing merchandise in his honour.

== Discography ==
=== Albums ===
- Da li imaš pravo? (1995)
- Gru2 (1996)
- Vetrenjače (1999)
- Beogard (2003)

=== Singles and EP's ===
- Da li imaš pravo? (1995)
- Biću tu (1996)
- I dalje me žele (2010)
- Ti to zoveš ljubav (2011)
- Samo za tvoje oči (2014)
- Dugme po dugme (2014)
- Novo leto (2015)
- Biću tu (20 godina kasnije) (2015)
- Kilo koke (2016)
- Plan B (2017)
- Nebrušen dijamant (2018)

=== Compilations ===
- Između redova (2002)
- The Ultimate Collection (2009)

== Filmography ==
=== Movie roles ===
Year	Title	Role	Notes
1997	Land of Truth, Love & Freedom	Vanja	Main role
2000	Dorćol-Manhattan	Petar Peca	Main role
2004	Poslednja Nova Godina	Himself	
2004	When I Grow Up, I'll Be a Kangaroo	Himself	Also provided vocals for the soundtrack
2006	Undisputed II: Last Man Standing	Dan	Cameo, composed the soundtrack
2010	A Serbian Film	Danilo	Cameo
2014	Monument to Michael Jackson	Toma	Cameo
2015	Stani na put	Himself	Documentary
2016	Herd	Marko	Minor role

=== Television roles ===
Year	Title	Role	Notes
2008	Samo Era	Ed the Showman	3 episodes
2009	Operacija trijumf	Himself	7th gala
2009	Veliki brat	Himself	Contestant; Runner-up
2010	Ulica lipa	Branislav Savić	2 episodes
2010–2017	AmiG Show	Himself	Guest; 4 episodes
2012	Folk	Dr. Nebojša Vujić	2 episodes
2013	Veče sa Ivanom Ivanovićem	Himself	Episode: Dalibor Andonov/Dani Klein
2014–2016	Tvoje lice zvuči poznato	Himself; Shakin' Stevens; Eros Ramazzotti	3 episodes Produced instrumentals
2015–2017	Top Show Serbia	Himself	Presenter
2017	Ja volim Srbiju	Himself	Guest
2018	Serbian Abarth VIP Challenge	Himself	Contestant

=== Serbian movie dubs ===
Year	Title	Role
2004	Shrek	Lord Farquaad
2004	Finding Nemo	Anchor
2007	The Simpsons Movie	Fat Tony
2008	Kung Fu Panda	Master Monkey
2010	Megamind	Minion
2011	Rio	Nico
2011	Kung Fu Panda 2	Master Monkey
2014	Rio 2	Nico
2016	Kung Fu Panda 3	Master Monkey

=== Serbian television dubs ===
Year	Title	Role
2003–2015	SpongeBob SquarePants	Squilliam Fancyson
2003	Spider-Man: The Animated Series	The Green Goblin
2003-2008	Ed, Edd n Eddy	Rolf
2012-2016	Kung Fu Panda: Legends of Awesomeness	Master Monkey
2013	The Penguins of Madagascar	Dr. Blowhole

=== Radio ===
Year	Title	Role	Notes
2003	Don Trialeon Radio Show	Himself	Presenter

== Awards and nominations ==
=== Serbian Oscars of Popularity ===
Year	Award	Category	Work	Result
1996	Serbian Oscar of Popularity	Best Single	Biću tu	Won
1996	Serbian Oscar of Popularity	Best Album	Gru 2	Won
1999	Serbian Oscar of Popularity	Best Concert	Vetrenjače	Won
2011	Serbian Oscar of Popularity	Best Single	I dalje me žele	Won

=== World Music Awards ===
Year	Award	Category	Work	Result
1997	World Music Awards	Best Hip-hop Single	Srce	Won

=== Indexi Awards ===
Year	Award	Category	Work	Result
2003	Indexi Award	Best Hip-hop album	Beograd	Won
2011	Indexi Award	Best Hip-hop Single	I dalje me žele	Won

=== MTV Platinum Awards ===
Year	Award	Category	Work	Result
2011	MTV Platinum Award	Best Single	I dalje me žele (With Ajs Nigrutin)	Won
2014	MTV Platinum Award	Best Single	Dugme po dugme	Nominated
2016	MTV Platinum Award	Best Single	Kilo koke	Won

=== MTV Gold Music Awards ===
Year	Award	Category	Work	Result
2014	MTV Gold Award	Best Single	Dugme po dugme	Nominated

=== Serbian Music Awards ===
Year	Award	Category	Work	Result
1996	Serbian Music Awards	Song of the Year	Biću tu	Won
2017	Serbian Music Awards	Song of the Year	Plan B	Won

== See also ==
- Honorific nicknames in popular music
- Music of Serbia
- Serbian hip hop
