= Kostić =

Kostić (Serbian Cyrillic: Костић, pronounced [kôstitɕ, kǒ-]) is a Serbian surname that may refer to the following notable people:

- Andrija Kostić (born 2009), Serbian racing driver
- Andrej Kostić (born 2007), Montenegrin footballer
- Bora Kostić (1930–2011), Serbian footballer
- Boris Kostić (1887–1963), Serbian chess player
- Branko Kostić (1939–2020), Montenegrin politician
- Darko Kostić (born 1980), Serbian fashion designer
- Duško Kostić, Roma student activist
- Filip Kostić (born 1992), Serbian footballer
- Goran Kostić (born 1971), Bosnian actor
- Laza Kostić (1841–1909), Serbian poet, prose writer, lawyer, philosopher, polyglot, publicist, and politician
- Lazo M. Kostić (1897–1979), Montenegrin Serb nationalist writer, economist, staticican and doctor in law
- Mika K. (Mirjana Kostić, born 1983), Serbian singer and musician
- Milos Kostic (born 1941), American triathlete
- Mina Kostić (born 1975), Bosnian-Serb singer
- Miodrag Kostić (1959–2024), Serbian businessman
- Tanja Kostic (born 1972), Swedish basketball player
- Vladan Kostić (born 1977), Montenegrin footballer
- Vladimir S. Kostić (born 1953), Serbian doctor, neurologist and neuroscientist
- Voki Kostić (1931–2010), Serbian composer
- Vuk Kostić (born 1979), Serbian actor
- Zoran Kostić (born 1964), Serbian punk rock musician
- Zoran Kostić (born 1982), Serbian footballer
