= Biću tu =

1996 single by Gru

Single by Gru

from the album Gru 2
- B-side: "Leto"
- Released: 17 January 1996 (Europe)
- Recorded: 1996
- Genre: Funk, pop, hip hop
- Length: 3:24
- Label: Jugodisk, Komuna
- Songwriters: Dalibor Andonov; Leontina Vukmanović
- Producers: Dalibor Andonov; Marko Kon

Gru singles chronology
"Da li imaš pravo?" (1995)	"Biću tu" (00000000)	"I dalje me žele" (2010)

Music video
- "Biću tu" on YouTube

"Biću tu" (I'll Be There) is a song recorded by Serbian recording artist Gru for his second studio album, Gru 2. The certified gold album sold 4 million copies, making it the most commercially successful albums in the Balkans. The song reached number one in Serbia in 1996 for 7 consecutive weeks, and in Montenegro for 5 weeks. Biću tu won Andonov a Serbian Oscar of Popularity in 1996, in the Best Singles category.

Recorded at Studio Puž on behalf of the labels City Records and later Komuna, it was produced by Andonov and musician Marko Kon. Written by Andonov and vocalist Leontina Vukmanović, the song also attributed vocals from the songwriters. Due to the song rising Gru to prominence in Eastern Europe, the song is credited as his signature song.

== Lyrics ==
The lyrics of Biću tu have been the subject of controversy, due to them discussing prostitution. The central motive of the song is an individual's booty call with a prostitute. Linguist and critic Danilo Janković described the song's lyrics as "a vignette heavily hinted by prostitution.

Written with dominantly Serbian lyrics, its refrain is repeated three times after the C phrase, once in English, once in Spanish and once in French. According to Andonov, the song portrays non-classic love, more centered around the hedonistic aspects of love.

== Music video ==
Biću tu, in harmony with its lyrics, was accompanied with a provocative music video, directed by Dejan Ivanković and Srđan Babović. The video begins with Andonov playing basketball in his backyard alongside Niggor, Marko Kon, Vladimir Ilić and Sky Wikluh. Andonov is later displayed in his living room, drinking lemonade, near his landline, calling a prostitute. Suddenly, 5 prostitutes are summoned in Andonov's living room, dancing and singing. The prostitutes were interpreted by the Cindy models, who later reprise their role in the Biću tu (20 godina kasnije) music video.

== Biću tu / 20 godina kasnije ==
Biću tu / 20 godina kasnije (I'll Be There / 20 Years Later) is a rendition of the song released in 2015. The single features hip-hop artist Gazda Paja, who replaced Vukmanović's vocals. The music video was produced by IDJ Videos.

== Track listing ==
Maxi single

1. "Biću tu" (Radio Version) – 4:20
2. "Biću tu" (Radio Club Remix) – 3:45
3. "Biću tu" (Instrumental) – 3:17

== Accolades ==
Year	Publisher	Country	Accolade	Rank
2000	Blic	Serbia	"Top 10 Best Balkan Rap Songs"	1
2004	Kurir	Serbia	"Top 10 Best Serbian Hip-Hop Songs"	1
2005	Hello	Serbia, Montenegro, Bosnia & Herzegovina, Republic of Macedonia	"Top 20 Best Serbian Rap Songs"	1
2005	Hello	Serbia, Montenegro, Bosnia & Herzegovina, Republic of Macedonia	"Top 20 Best Balkan Rap Songs"	2
2012	Nedeljnik	Serbia	"10 Essential Hip-Hop Classics"	4
