= Vetrenjače =

Studio album by Gru
- Released: 1999
- Recorded: March 1998 – January 1999
- Genre: Funk, hip hop, pop, swing
- Length: 39:20
- Label: City Records, Komuna
- Producer: Dalibor Andonov Gru, Marko Kon

Gru chronology
Gru 2 (1996)	Vetrenjače (1999)	Između redova (2002)

Vetrenjače is the third studio album published by Serbian musician and producer Gru. The album was certified gold in Serbia, and it won him the Serbian Oscar of Popularity for Best Concert in 1999. It also featured the chart-topping song Adrenaline Junkie, featured in the soundtrack for the American film Undisputed II: Last Man Standing.

Vetrenjače features production by Andonov and musician Marko Kon, on behalf of the label City Records, and later Komuna.

== Track listing ==
No.	Title	Lyrics	Music	Length
1.	"Ljuba nudi ljubav" ("Ljuba Offers Love")	D. Andonov, L. Vukmanović	D. Andonov	3:38
2.	"Mišel" ("Michelle")	D. Andonov	D. Andonov	3:19
3.	"Adrenalin Džanki" ("Adrenaline Junkie")	D. Andonov	D. Andonov	3:12
4.	"U vašem svetu" ("In Your World")	D. Andonov	D. Andonov, M. Kon	4:16
5.	"Vegeta" ("Vegeta")	D. Andonov	D. Andonov	3:26
6.	"Ozbiljna veza" ("Serious Relationship")	D. Andonov	D. Andonov	4:02
7.	"Pizza vegetariana" ("Vegetarian Pizza")	D. Andonov, M. Kon	D. Andonov	3:28
8.	"U vašem svetu II" ("In Your World II")	D. Andonov	D. Andonov	4:10
9.	"Neću" ("I Won't")	D. Andonov	D. Andonov	3:17
10.	"Vetrenjače" ("Windmills")	D. Andonov	D. Andonov	4:14
11.	"Putnik" ("Traveller")	D. Andonov	D. Andonov	4:04
12.	"Nebo ispod zemlje" ("Sky Below Ground")	D. Andonov	D. Andonov	3:48
13.	"Dok si bila tu" ("When You Were Here")	D. Andonov	D. Andonov	4:20

== See also ==
- Music of Serbia
- Serbian hip hop
