= Your Face Sounds Familiar (Albanian TV series) =

- Genre: Reality competition
- Created by: Endemol
- Based on: Your Face Sounds Familiar
- Presented by: Alketa Vejsiu
- Judges: Bleona Qereti; Arian Çani; Bojken Lako; Albërie Hadërgjonaj; Olta Gixhari
- Country of origin: Albania
- Original language: Albanian
- No. of seasons: 2
- No. of episodes: 26

Production
- Production location: Albania
- Camera setup: Multi-camera
- Running time: 90 minutes
- Production company: TV Klan

Original release
- Network: TV Klan
- Release: 14 March 2016 – 5 June 2017

Your Face Sounds Familiar sometimes abbreviated as (YFSF) is an Albanian reality comepetitive series. It is one of several dozen local versions of the Your Face Sounds Familiar format. The first series started airing on 14 March 2016. The host is Alketa Vejsiu and the broadcaster is TV Klan.

== Season 01 ==
The first season started to air on 14 March 2016 and ended on 7 June 2016 on TV Klan. In every episode, before the host arrives, in the introduction, eight dancers dance to "Let's Get Loud".

=== Contestants ===
- Adelina Tahiri
- Anxhela Peristeri
- Besnik Çaka
- Endri Prifti
- Era Rusi
- Kastro Zizo
- Rozana Radi

=== Judges ===
- Bleona Qereti
- Arian Çani
- Bojken Lako

=== Celebrities impersonated ===
==== Episode 01 ====
Since it was the first episode, two judges (Bojken & Bleona) both impersonated an artist; Arian did not.

Judge	Celebrity impersonated	Song
Bojken	David Bowie	"Heroes"
Bleona	Shania Twain	"Man! I Feel Like a Woman!"

Contestant	Celebrity impersonated	Song
Adelina	Jennifer Lopez	"On the Floor"
Anxhela	Albërie Hadërgjonaj	"Ha Sta Je"
Besnik	Prince	"Kiss"
Endri	Vasco Rossi	"Siamo Soli"
Era	Whoopi Goldberg	"I Will Follow Him"
Kastro	Conchita Wurst	"Rise Like a Phoenix"
Rozana	Amy Winehouse	"Rehab"

==== Episode 02 ====
Contestant	Celebrity impersonated	Song
Adelina	Genta Ismajli	"Nuk dua tjetër"
Rozana	Gianna Nannini	"Amandoti! (È la vita la mia)"
Besnik	John Lennon	"Love Me Do"
Endri	Robbie Williams	"Angels"
Era	Lady Gaga	"Poker Face"
Kastro	Zucchero	"Il Volo"
Anxhela	Cher	"Dov'è L'amore"

==== Episode 03 ====
Contestant	Celebrity impersonated	Song
Anxhela	Anna Oxa	"Camminando Camminando"
Endri	Elvis Presley	"Blue Suede Shoes"
Besnik	Robin Thicke	"Blurred Lines"
Era	Bon Jovi	"Always"
Adelina	Rihanna	"Man Down"
Kastro	Daddy Yankee	"Gasolina"
Rozana	Ray Charles	"Hit the Road Jack"

==== Episode 04 ====
Contestant	Celebrity impersonated	Song
Kastro	Antonio Banderas	"Canción del Mariachi"
Era	Tina Turner	"Simply The Best"
Besnik	Freddie Mercury	"I Want to Break Free"
Endri	Louis Armstrong	"What a Wonderful World"
Adelina	Shakira	"Wherever, Whenever"
Anxhela	Kaoma	"Lambada"
Rozana	Beyoncé	"Run the World (Girls)"

==== Episode 05 ====
Contestant	Celebrity impersonated	Song
Adelina	Britney Spears	"Toxic"
Endri	Joe Cocker	"You Can Leave Your Hat On"
Era	Liza Minnelli	"Mein Herr"
Besnik	Inner Circle	"Sweat (A La La La La Long)"
Anxhela	Christina Aguilera	"Hurt"
Rozana	Psy	"Gangnam Style"
Kastro	Azis	"Sen Trope"

==== Episode 06 ====
Contestant	Celebrity impersonated	Song
Adelina	Madonna	"La Isla Bonita"
Kastro	Kurt Cobain	"Smells Like Teen Spirit"
Endri	Tom Jones	"Delilah"
Rozana	Édith Piaf	"Non, Je Ne Regrette Rien"
Besnik	Stevie Wonder	"I Just Called to Say I Love You"
Anxhela	Andrea Bocelli	"Con Te Partirò"
Era	Whitney Houston	"I Have Nothing"

==== Episode 07 (Albanians Special) ====
Contestant	Celebrity impersonated	Song
Besnik	Iliret	"Xhamadani vija vija"
Kastro	Elita 5	"Al Kapone"
Anxhela	Nexhmije Pagarusha	"Baresha"
Adelina	Sabri Fejzullahu	"Fsahtarja ime"
Era	Vaçe Zela	"Rrjedh në këngë e ligjërime"
Rozana	Aurela Gaçe	"Orgjinale"
Endri	Aleksander Gjoka	"Dite dimri"

==== Episode 08 ====
Contestant	Celebrity impersonated	Song
Kastro	Panjabi MC	"Mundian to Bach Ke"
Adelina	Kylie Minogue	"Can't Get You Out of My Head"
Endri	Prince	"Purple Rain"
Era	Nicki Minaj	"Hey Mama"
Rozana	Toni Braxton	"Un-Break My Heart"
Anxhela	Aretha Franklin	"Think"
Besnik	Bruno Mars	"Uptown Funk"

==== Episode 09 ====
Contestant	Celebrity impersonated	Song
Endri	James Brown	"It's a Man's Man's Man's World"
Kastro	Jim Carrey	"Cuban Pete" from The Mask
Era	Katy Perry	"I Kissed a Girl"
Besnik	Enrique Iglesias	"Bailamos"
Anxhela	Anna Vissi	"Treno"
Rozana	Shakira	"Waka Waka (This Time for Africa)"
Adelina	Helena Paparizou	"My Number One"

==== Episode 10 ====
Contestant	Celebrity impersonated	Song
Era	Jessie J	"Mamma Knows Best"
Endri	Eros Ramazzotti	"Cose Della Vita"
Anxhela	P!nk	"Just Give Me a Reason"
Besnik	Justin Timberlake	"SexyBack"
Kastro	LMFAO	"Sexy and I Know It"
Adelina	Alexandra Stan	"Mr. Saxobeat"
Rozana	Pitbull	"Bon, Bon"

==== Episode 11 ====
Contestant	Celebrity impersonated	Song
Endri	Mick Jagger	"(I Can't Get No) Satisfaction"
Kastro	Lucio Dalla	"Caruso"
Era	Bonnie Tyler	"Holding Out for a Hero"
Adelina	Beyoncé	"Baby Boy"
Besnik	John Legend	"All of Me"
Anxhela	Lara Fabian	"Je Suis Malade"
Rozana	Esma Redžepova	"Čaje Šukarije"

==== Episode 12 ====
Contestant	Celebrity impersonated	Song
Endri	Giannis Parios	"Aporo"
Adelina	The Pussycat Dolls	"Don't Cha"
Besnik	The Weeknd	"Earned It" / "Can't Feel My Face"
Rozana	Lady Gaga	"Bad Romance"
Anxhela	Elton John	"Sorry Seems to be the Hardest Word"
Era	Europe	"The Final Countdown"
Kastro	Marilyn Manson	"Sweet Dreams (Are Made of This)"

==== Episode 13 (Finale) ====
Contestant	Celebrity impersonated	Song
Adelina	Ruslana	"Wild Dances"
Besnik	Michael Jackson	"Beat It"
Rozana	Adriano Celentano	"Il ragazzo della via Gluck" / "24000 Baci"
Anxhela	Etta James	"At Last"
Era	Luciano Pavarotti	"Nessun Dorma"
Kastro	King África	"La Bomba"
Endri	Pink Floyd	"Another Brick in the Wall"

Contestants	Celebrities impersonated	Song	Place
Adelina	Iggy Azalea	"Booty"	6th
Rozana	Jennifer Lopez	"Booty"	5th
Besnik	A Great Big World	"Say Something"	3rd
Era	Christina Aguilera	"Say Something"	2nd
Anxhela	Sia	"Cheap Thrills"	1st
Kastro	Sean Paul	"Cheap Thrills"	4th
Endri	Pink Floyd	"Another Brick in the Wall"	7th

== Season 02 ==
The second season started to air on 21 February 2017 and ended on 5 June 2017 on TV Klan. The introduction was refreshed.

=== Contestants ===
- Beatrix Ramosaj
- Flaka Krelani
- Herion Mustafaraj
- Shpat Kasapi
- Arinda Gjoni
- Valon Shehu

=== Other acts ===
- Marjana & Xumi
- Ana Kodra

=== Judges ===
- Albërie Hadërgjonaj
- Olta Gixhari
- Arian Çani

=== Celebrities impersonated ===
==== Episode 01 ====
Contestant	Celebrity impersonated	Song
Herion	Elvis Presley	"Love Me Tender" / "Hound Dog"
Beatrix	Britney Spears	"Gimme More"
Valon	Louis Armstrong	"What a Wonderful World"
Shpat	Ricky Martin	"Maria"
Arinda	Beyoncé	"Crazy in Love"
Flaka	Freddie Mercury	"Don't Stop Me Now"
Marjana & Xumi	Enca and Noizy	"Bow Down"

Guest	Celebrity impersonated	Song
Ana Kodra	Edith Piaf	"Padam... Padam..."
Olta Gixhari	Kim Basinger	"Let's Do It" (The Marrying Man soundtrack)
Albërie Hadërgjonaj	Mariah Carey	"Without You"

==== Episode 02 ====
Contestant	Celebrity impersonated	Song
Arinda	Nicole Scherzinger	"The Phantom of the Opera"
Valon	Frank Sinatra	"My Way"
Shpat	Bujar Qamili	"Kolazh Shkodran"
Herion	The Gipsy Kings	"Baila Me"
Flaka	Christina Aguilera	"Tough Lover" (Burlesque film)
Beatrix	2 Unlimited	"Get Ready for This"
Marjana & Xumi	Elvana and Kaos	"Disco Disco"

==== Episode 03 ====
Contestant	Celebrity impersonated	Song
Arinda	Mireille Mathieu	"Mon Credo"
Valon	Prince	"Purple Rain"
Shpat	Chubby Checker	"Let's Twist Again"
Herion	Adriano Celentano	"24000 Baci"
Flaka	Jennifer Lopez	"Let's Get Loud"
Beatrix	Whitney Houston	"I Have Nothing"
Marjana & Xumi	Gru & Milutin	"I dalje me žele"

==== Episode 04 ====
Contestant	Celebrity impersonated	Song
Arinda	Giusy Ferreri	"Volevo te"
Valon	Aleksander Gjoka	"Kuturu"
Shpat	Maria Callas	"Habanera"
Herion	Kozma Dushi	"Eja o shoku yne" / "Te me vini pa trokitur"
Flaka	Gru	"Biću tu"
Beatrix	Haddaway	"What Is Love"
Marjana & Xumi	Silva ft. Mandi	

==== Episode 05 ====
Contestant	Celebrity impersonated	Song
Arinda	Fatmira Bercani	"Hidhe Vallen"
Valon	HIM	"Join Me In Death" / "Wicked Game"
Shpat	Enrique Iglesias	"Bailando"
Herion	Dr. Flori	"Ku ka si Tirona"
Flaka	Michael Jackson	"Billie Jean" / "Dirty Diana"
Beatrix	Madonna	"Vogue"
Marjana & Xumi	Tuna ft. Cozman	

==== Episode 13 ====
Contestant	Celebrity impersonated	Song
Arinda	Nexhmije Pagarusha	
Valon	Dr. Alban	"It's My Life"
Shpat	Eros Ramazzotti	"Piu Bella Cosa"
Herion	Mike Diamondz	"La Onda"
Flaka	James Brown	"It's a Man's Man's Man's World" / "Get Up (I Feel Like Being a) Sex Machine"
Beatrix	Celine Dion	"My Heart Will Go On"
Coxalz, Marjana & Xumi	Michael Jackson & Gru	"Hello" / "Somebody's Watching Me" / "You Are Not Alone"

Guest	Celebrity impersonated	Song
Olta Gixhari	Jessica Rabbit	"Why Don't You Do Right?"
Herion Mustafaraj	The Blues Brothers	"Sweet Home Chicago"
Xum Allushi	The Blues Brothers	"Sweet Home Chicago"
Besnik Qaka	Stevie Wonder	"Faith"
Beatrix Ramosaj	Ariana Grande	"Faith"
Kastro Zizo	Lucio Dalla	"Caruso"
Flaka	Lara Fabian	"Caruso"
Adelina Tahiri	Shakira	"Beautiful Liar"
Arinda	Beyonce	"Beautiful Liar"
Era Rusi	Joss Stone	"Angels"
Valon	Robbie Williams	"Angels"
