= I dalje me žele =

2010 single by Gru

Single by Gru
- Released: 27 May 2010 (Europe)
- Recorded: 2010
- Genre: Hip hop
- Length: 4:14
- Label: City Records
- Songwriters: Dalibor Andonov; Vladan Aksentijević
- Producers: Dalibor Andonov; Aleksandar Stanojević

Gru singles chronology
"Biću tu" (1996)	"I dalje me žele" (00000000)	"Ti to zoveš ljubav" (2011)

Music video
- "I dalje me žele" on YouTube

"I dalje me žele" (They Still Want Me) is a song recorded and written by Serbian rappers Gru and Ajs Nigrutin of Bad Copy. The song was number 1 in Serbia for 8 consecutive weeks and reached number 1 in Montenegro, Croatia, Ukraine, Bulgaria, Poland, Bosnia and Herzegovina and Republic of Macedonia. The song was nominated for the MTV Platinum Awards in the category for Best Singles.

== Lyrics ==
The lyrics tackle Nigrutin and Gru's career, drawing parallels that people still respect their artistry after their initially rise to prominence. Similar to his previous single Biću tu, it contained provocative lyrics about prostitution and issues of popularity. With production done by Andonov and Aleksandar Stanojević, I dalje me žele was recorded after Gru's 3-year hiatus, in efforts to assert fame yet again. According to a 2018 interview by Balkan Info, Andonov stated that "I dalje me žele was a step in the right direction, in harmony with the evolution of underground hip-hop".

== Music video ==
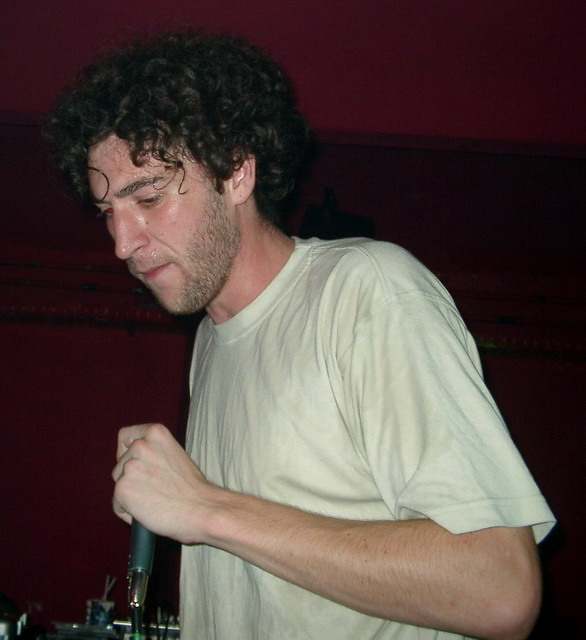
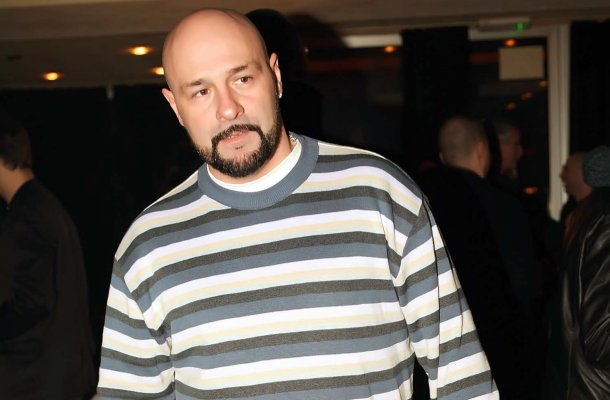
Ajs Nigrutin (left) and Dalibor Andonov (right) wrote the song in 2010

The music video for I dalje me žele was recorded in Belgrade, Pančevo and Dimitrovgrad as the dominant places where Andonov spent his life. In the scenes filmed in Belgrade, Andonov is rapping in the Vojislava Ilića 86 street of Voždovac, near the night club Excellent. In Pančevo, Nigrutin and Gru are in the Central Pančevo Club performing with Ivana Stamenković Cindy from the Belgrade-based pop-folk recording act Models on stage. In the scenes in Dimitrovgrad, Andonov is walking through his childhood neighbourhood of Babušnica, and is performing with Nigrutin in the Hemija Dimitrovgrad Club. In the Hemija Dimitrovgrad Club, a guest appearance by Maldivian performer and model of Serbian descent Una Grujić is featured. The video was directed by Serbian director Milan Mima Babović, and co-directed by Serbian artist Uroš Kilibarda Stanić.

== Reception ==
I dalje me žele received generally positive reviews by critics. Montenegrin music critic and hip-hop veteran Zoran Jovanović described the song as "the perfect return after a hiatus, with refreshed motifs of rap, wrapped up in a modern production". Singer-songwriter and critic Nenad Baraljić credited the song in a segment in Stani na put, stating that "the song is an essential Balkan rap classic, leaning more towards commercialisation than underground".

== In popular culture ==
The song was interpreted in various national renditions of Your Face Sounds Familiar. It was sung in 2013 by Serbian artists Sky Wikluh and Sneki in first season of the Serbian version of Your Face Sounds Familiar. It made an appearance in Като две капки вода, the Bulgarian version of the reality show, where it was sung by chalga vocalist Azis in 2012, as well as the Polish version Twoja twarz brzmi znajomo in 2014, sung by television personality Jacek Kawalec. Estonian performer Vaiko Eplik sang the song as Nigrutin in the second episode of the Estonian Your Face Sounds Familiar in 2016." The most recent interpretation was in 2017, when singer-songwriter Flaka Krelani sung the song as Gru, including Biću tu as a medley in the second season of the Albanian Your Face Sounds Familiar.

I dalje me žele was included in the soundtrack for A Serbian Film and in the Sergej Trifunović film Samo sivi dani. It also was heard numerous times in Marchelo's documentary Stani na put.

== Accolades ==
Year	Publisher	Country	Accolade	Rank
2010	Kurir	Serbia	"Top 10 Best Rap Songs of 2010"	1
2012	Nedeljnik	Serbia	"10 Essential Hip-Hop Classics"	9
2014	Blic	Serbia	"20 Best Hip-Hop Songs of the Last Decade"	1
