= Orbod mebej =

1996 studio album by Bad Copy

Studio album by Bad Copy
- Released: 1996
- Genres: Hip-hop, comedy rap
- Length: 33:41
- Language: Serbian
- Label: ITMM

Bad Copy chronology
Orbod mebej (1996)	Sve sami hedovi (2003)

Orbod mebej is the debut studio album by the Serbian hip-hop group Bad Copy, released on cassette by the Belgrade label ITMM in 1996. It was recorded when the group was still a duo of Ajs Nigrutin and Miki Boj.

== Background and release ==
Bad Copy began as a duo of Ajs Nigrutin and Miki Boj, and Orbod mebej was their first album. Miki Boj died in Kosovo in 1999. Ajs Nigrutin later continued the group with Timbe and Sky Wikluh, and the new line-up released its next album, Sve sami hedovi, in 2003.

The album was first issued in Yugoslavia on audio cassette (catalogue number MC 2045). In 2013, ITMM and Mascom Records reissued it on digital platforms.

== Music ==
Several tracks are built on samples of American hip-hop and jazz recordings:

- "Intro" samples "Too Hot" by Coolio.
- "Zabaci domaćine" samples "Gangsta's Paradise" by Coolio featuring L.V.
- "Mirko i Slavko" samples "Craziest" by Naughty by Nature.
- "Disciplina kičme" samples "Take Me to the Mardi Gras" by Bob James and "Insane in the Brain" by Cypress Hill.
- "Outro" samples "Geto Fantasy" by the Geto Boys.

== Track listing ==
Track titles and lengths are taken from the digital reissue. The cassette splits the tracks into two sides.

Side A
No.	Title	Length
1.	"Intro"	1:23
2.	"Zabaci domaćine"	4:04
3.	"Profuknjača"	3:10
4.	"Kurslus"	3:40
5.	"Ništa od repovanja"	2:51

Side B
No.	Title	Length
6.	"Gedža"	4:17
7.	"Mirko i Slavko" (featuring Boško Buha)	3:41
8.	"Bad Copy Ride" (featuring Timbe)	5:11
9.	"Disciplina kičme"	3:57
10.	"Outro"	1:27
Total length:		33:41
