= Shappa =

2005 studio album by Wikluh Sky, Coyote and King Kyll

Studio album by Wikluh Sky and Coyote featuring King Kyll
- Released: 2005
- Genres: Reggae, dub
- Length: 58:33
- Label: Ammonite Records
- Producer: Wikluh Sky

Shappa is a 2005 studio album by the reggae and dub musical project of the same name, a collaboration between Serbian musicians Wikluh Sky and Nemanja Kojić (Hornsman Coyote) and French musician King Kyll. The album was originally released by the Belgrade-based record label Ammonite Records.

At the time of the collaboration, Wikluh Sky was a member of the Serbian hip-hop group Bad Copy, while Coyote was associated with the band Eyesburn. The project combined reggae and dub influences, with all three musicians contributing to the recording.

The album contains 14 tracks, with a total running time of approximately 58 minutes.

== Production and personnel ==
Wikluh Sky produced and arranged the album. He also contributed vocals and played viola, guitar and drums.

The principal performers were:

- Wikluh Sky – production, arrangements, vocals, viola, guitar and drums
- Hornsman Coyote – vocals
- King Kyll – vocals

== Track listing ==
Track titles and running times are based on the listing published by Amazon Music.

No.	Title	Length
1.	"Downlow"	3:20
2.	"Against the Law"	3:34
3.	"I Live with Jah"	4:10
4.	"Look Me in the Eyes"	3:58
5.	"Music Warriors"	5:58
6.	"Dub Another Way"	3:09
7.	"Celebration"	5:07
8.	"Cross the Earth"	4:17
9.	"Information Overload"	3:23
10.	"Hopefully Forever"	4:14
11.	"What Dem Do"	5:23
12.	"World's on Fire!"	4:37
13.	"All Dem Lies"	5:33
14.	"Search Within"	1:50
Total length:		58:33
