= Mika K. =

Serbian musician (born 1983)

- Born: Mirjana Kostić; 6 August 1983 (age 42); Kanjiža, SR Serbia, SFR Yugoslavia
- Genres: Pop, pop rock, jazz, R&B
- Occupations: Singer, songwriter, composer, television personality
- Instruments: Vocals, piano, keyboards
- Years active: 2008 – present
- Label: City Records
- Website: mikakostic.com

Mirjana Kostić (Serbian Cyrillic: Мирјана Костић; born 6 August 1983), professionally known as Mika K., is a Serbian singer and musician who came to media attention as a contestant on the talent show Operacija trijumf.

== Personal life ==
Kostić graduated from the musical high school in Subotica and won a full scholarship for Berklee College of Music in Boston twice. She has two older sisters, one of whom is an opera singer in London.

Kostić admires Beyoncé Knowles, Alicia Keys, Anastacia, Lauryn Hill, Toše Proeski, and Dino Dvornik. She is fluent in Serbian, English, and Hungarian.

== Career ==
=== Operacija trijumf ===
Before the Operacija trijumf, Kostić had a few television appearances on the B92. In 2008, she achieved regional fame as a student of Operacija trijumf, the Balkan version of Endemol's Fame Academy. At the opening gala event, she performed "Molitva", the Eurovision Song Contest 2007 winning song of Marija Šerifović, with Šerifović herself and another student, Milica Radošević. After a series of additional competitions, broadcast on the Operacija trijumf special show, the audience decided to give Kostić and Macedonian Kristijan Jovanov a second chance.

Kostić and Jovanov entered the academy after the fifth gala event. Kostić's first performance as a student was at the sixth gala, where she sang En Vogue's hit single "Free Your Mind" with Sonja Bakić. Kostić and Jovanov, as the students least known to the audience, left the academy after the seventh gala, where Kostić performed "Kofer ljubavi" by Macedonian singer Kaliopi with Kaliopi herself. After her performance with Kostić on the Operacija trijumf, Kaliopi said Kostić was her favourite on the show and that she is preparing a song for Kostić because she is impressed by her voice.

When she was nominated, Kostić cried and said that she did not want to leave the academy and she and Jovanov are not responsible for the things that had happened earlier at the academy. She later said that "this is injustice", and that she feels sorry because the audience could not meet her better.

=== Studio career ===
After the show, Kostić took on the professional nickname "Mika K.".

Serbian composer and rap musician Sky Wikluh wrote a song for her, "Moja noć", with production done by Gru. This song was one of the reserves for the Beovizija 2009, in the event that one of the twenty contestants decided not to take part. Kostić also sang backing vocals for Regina's song "Bistra voda", which represented Bosnia and Herzegovina in the Eurovision Song Contest 2009. On 1 July 2009, Kostić performed "Bože pravde", the anthem of Serbia, alongside two other singers at the opening ceremony of 2009 Summer Universiade in Belgrade. She also performed "Bože pravde" at the closing ceremony of the 2009 Summer Universiade and the public reception of Serbian champions from the 2009 World Aquatics Championships. In August 2009, Kostić performed as a revival artist at the music festival in Ohrid, performing "Moja noć" and her new single "Daj mi sve," which features Sky Wikluh as a supporting artist.

Kostić is currently working on her debut album, which will be produced by Sky Wikluh and include collaborations with several musicians worldwide, such as Greek pop star Anna Vissi. She announced that she will record songs in Serbian, English, and Hungarian.

== Discography ==
=== Singles ===
Year	Single	Album	Notes
2009	"Moja noć"	Upcoming debut album	
2009	"Daj mi sve"	Upcoming debut album	Featuring Sky Wikluh

== Awards and nominations ==
Year	Award	Category	For	Result
2009	Vrnjačka Banja Festival Awards	Breakthrough of the Year	"Moja noć"	Won
