= Juice (Serbian rapper) =

Serbian rapper (born 1981)

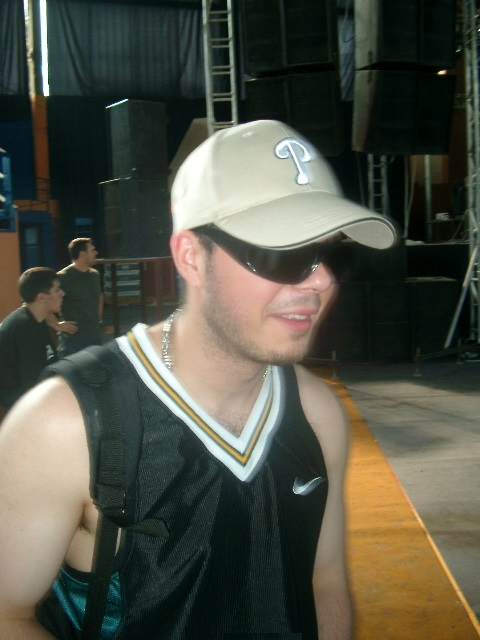
- Juice in 2007

Background information
- Born: Ivan Ivanović; 17 October 1981 (age 45); Belgrade, SR Serbia, SFR Yugoslavia
- Genres: Hip-hop; pop-folk
- Occupations: Rapper; singer; television personality
- Years active: 1996–present
- Labels: Centroscena; BK Sound; City Records; IDJTunes
- Website: juice.rs

Ivan Ivanović (Serbian: Иван Ивановић; born 17 October 1981), known professionally as Juice (Serbian: Ђус, Đus), is a Serbian rapper, singer, and television personality. Active since the mid-1990s, he first gained recognition as a founding member of the underground hip-hop duo Full Moon before establishing the collective 93 FU Kru. He achieved mainstream breakthrough in Serbia and the former Yugoslavia with his debut solo studio album, Hiphopium Vol. 1 (2002), featuring the hit single "Keš kolica", and continued his commercial success with Brate minli (2006) and subsequent installments of the Hiphopium series. Outside of his recording career, he is known for his appearances on Serbian reality television, winning the first season of Dvor in 2011.

== Career ==
=== 1996–2001: Early beginnings and Full Moon ===
Born and raised in Belgrade, Ivanović became involved in the city's underground hip-hop and street culture during the mid-1990s, initially starting out as a graffiti artist and breakdancer before recording his first demo tracks in 1996. After briefly performing with the local group Boys in the Hood, he partnered with rapper Shorty to form the hip-hop duo Full Moon. Alongside acts such as Gru, Bad Copy, and Beogradski Sindikat, the duo played a notable role in shaping the late-1990s wave of Serbian hip-hop. In 1998, Full Moon released their studio album Na nivou through Centroscena, which spawned the underground hit single "Razmisli". The group appeared at domestic music festivals and performed as an opening act for the American hip-hop group Das EFX in Belgrade before disbanding at the turn of the decade.

=== 2002–2009: Solo breakthrough, Hiphopium, and Brate minli ===
Following the dissolution of Full Moon, Juice founded the hip-hop collective 93 FU Kru and pursued a solo career. In 2002, he released his debut solo studio album, Hiphopium Vol. 1, through BK Sound. The album became one of the defining Serbian hip-hop releases of the early 2000s, propelled by the commercial success of the lead single "Keš kolica", which crossed over from underground clubs into mainstream radio and television. Through his music videos and visual identity, Juice also popularized a revival of Belgrade's 1990s dizelaši street subculture.

After completing his mandatory military service, Juice signed with City Records and released his second studio album, Brate minli, in 2006. The record marked a stylistic shift, blending street rap with turbo-folk and pop-folk elements—a crossover approach he further explored through collaborations with mainstream folk singers such as Anabela and Mina Kostić. In 2008, he released his third studio album, Hiphopium 2, and provided the voice of Moto Moto in the Serbian dub of the animated film Madagascar: Escape 2 Africa. Around the same period, he launched his own streetwear clothing line, 93 FU Kru, and opened several retail stores in Serbia and North Macedonia.

=== 2010–present: Reality television and later releases ===
In 2010, Juice participated in the second season of the reality television series Farma, from which he was disqualified following a dispute with fellow contestant Miloš Bojanić. In August of that year, following his appearance on the program, he was physically assaulted by unidentified individuals in Belgrade. In 2011, he entered the first season of the reality competition Dvor, ultimately winning the show and receiving a grand prize of €50,000 alongside an additional €10,000.

Returning to studio work, Juice released his fourth album, Apetiti mi rastu, through City Records in 2012. In May 2015, he signed with IDJTunes and released his fifth studio album, Hiphopium 3, accompanied by a music video for the single "Mira Škorić", produced by Unik. He subsequently released the studio albums Od blata do zlata (2017), Hiphopium 4 (2020), and Dom za nezbrinute pesme (2023).

== Discography ==
=== Studio albums ===
- Hiphopium Vol. 1 (2002)
- Brate minli (2006)
- Hiphopium 2 (2008)
- Apetiti mi rastu (2012)
- Hiphopium 3 (2015)
- Od blata do zlata (2017)
- Hiphopium 4 (2020)
- Dom za nezbrinute pesme (2023)

=== Collaborative albums ===
- Na nivou (with Full Moon) (1998)
