= The Master Scratch Band =

The Master Scratch Band are a group considered to have started Serbian hip hop in the early 1980s with their Degout EP, which was released through Jugoton in the year 1984. The release had five electro-breakbeat tracks with rap in English and Serbian. As Serbia was a part of Yugoslavia at the time, the release is also considered the first Yugoslav hip hop release.

Zoran Jevtić, Zoran Vračević and Miša Stojisiljević composed, programmed, recorded and produced the MSB project. Since the only samplers available then were far beyond their financial reach, the trio had to employ some tricks to achieve the sound they wanted. Synthesizers, drum machines, vocoders and delay processors were used in an innovative way.

The team worked with a number of contributors over a month or so in the famous "Druga Maca" studio. The studio time was free of charge, since the owner was curious about the MSB's music, which was so radically different at the time.

The Degout EP was released by the Jugoton label, from Zagreb (in SR Croatia, Yugoslavia (today independent Croatia)). The EP resulted in two chart hits in Yugoslavia and a number of TV appearances.

== See also ==
- Serbian hip hop
