= Serbian hip-hop =

Music genre or scene

- Stylistic origins: Hip-hop
- Cultural origins: 1984; 42 years ago

Serbian hip-hop (Serbian: cрпcки хип-хоп, romanized: srpski hip-hop) is an umbrella term for all genres of hip-hop in the Serbian language. It sometimes also refers to any hip-hop music made by Serbs, including instrumental hip-hop, and rap songs by members of the Serbian diaspora, often in languages other than Serbian. Some of the most prominent hip-hop groups include VIP, Sunshine, p.pop Beogradski Sindikat, Bad Copy. Popular solo artists include Juice, Gru, Struka, Ajs Nigrutin, Marčelo,

== History ==
=== Early roots ===
Serbian hip-hop first started in the early 1980s with the birth of b-boy crews. The first Serbian hip-hop record release was the Degout EP by The Master Scratch Band, which was released by Jugoton in 1984. The hip-hop scene in Serbia was not popularized until the demo band of teenagers Badvajzer (Budweiser) appeared in 1987, and became extremely popular.

In the late 1980s and early 1990s, bands such as CYA, Green Kool Posse (Sunshine crew), Who Is The Best, Robin Hood, Double 1, Bez Kaucije, Crno-Bela Veza, and Jedva Smo Se Skupili came into being, all together starting the first hip-hop scene in Serbia and the former Yugoslavia.

=== First wave ===
The music was spreading slowly until 1995, when Da li imaš pravo? by Gru was released, marking the beginning of the first wave of Serbian hip-hop, which reached its peak in 1997–98. Around the same time, several new groups emerged. CYA, Ila (later Sha Ila), Voodoo Popeye, Sunshine, Bad Copy, Double1, Robin Hood (group), Ding Dong, Full Moon (Shorty & Juice), Straight Jackin, Belgrade Ghetto, 187 and Sekcija Mraka (the first horror rap underground group in Serbia) are a few of the many. Monteniggers, from Montenegro (at the time in a state union with Serbia), were another popular rap group. Just as the scene was taking off, there was a surge of new talent, likely due to the economic effects of the Kosovo War of 1999. This resulted in only a few hip-hop albums released in the years between 1999–2001.

=== Second wave ===
In 2002, the silence was shown to be temporary with the founding of the Bassivity label, which made Serbian, Bosnian, and Croatian hip-hop widely available in record stores. Their first release, V.I.P. - Ekipa Stigla, was one of the two albums that marked the beginning of the second wave of Serbian hip-hop. The other was BSSST...Tišinčina by the Belgrade group Beogradski sindikat, formed 1999. The same group also released the highly controversial political single Govedina in late 2002, which fueled the popularisation of hip-hop in Serbia.

Another such early example was Prti Bee Gee, which in 2001, with their song Pajp featuring Ajs Nigrutin, quickly secured their place as one of the most influential and authentic groups in Serbian (and Balkan) rap.

In 2003, Marčelo's debut album De Facto, also released on the Bassivity label, came out to both popular and critical acclaim, and he was branded as the voice of a new generation.

Since then, Bassivity Music has released a couple more records before their transformation into a production company in 2007. Beogradski sindikat have followed up their debut with 2005's Svi zajedno, having founded their own label, Prohibicija, due to their dissatisfaction with Automatik Records. Despite the success of his debut album, Marčelo was unable to settle his differences with Bassivity label, and at the end of 2005, appropriately marking the end of the second wave, released his second album Puzzle Shock! (Multimedia Records).

Since 2007, the oldest independent label in Serbia, Take It Or Leave It Records (established 1992), and their sub-label Rap Cartel have released almost every rap album. The first rap CD published by Rap Cartel was a compilation "Rap Cartel-Pablo je pao vol.1". The main rap singers known and published by Rap Cartel label are SHA, Bata Barata ex Shorty, Monogamija, Bitcharke na travi, Bvana iz lagune, Hartmann, J COOK, M.A.X., Prti Beegee, De Niro, VOX, and many lesser-known artists. This label also published the first licensed album from America, CD HAVIKK-Rhymme son (South Central cartel).

Some other notable rappers from the second wave are Struka, Don Trialeon, Seven, Beton liga, Demonio, Lud, Kajblo Spirit, Suid, Tripe-r, and Nidza Bleja.

=== Third wave ===
The third wave of RnB in Serbia started in 2006. Third wave artists such as Elitni odredi, Cvija, or Rasta arrived on the scene as soon as the Bassivity era was over. They stand for a commercialised version of hip-hop compared to their "ancestors", kids like what they're doing and some of their hits like Samo Da Si Samnom (Elitni odredi), Moja Želja Si Ti (Cvija), and Superstar (Rasta) have become clubbing classics throughout cities in Serbia.

There is also a new wave of rap—some would say, real rap or hip-hop—that is more intelligent, more about real life and about growing up on the streets or about political themes that is becoming more and more popular and can be heard on every street or any city in Serbia. Some of them are Marlon Brutal (New wave of street rap) with hits such as "Favela", "Blok Sajmište", "Brate mnogo variš" and "Beli rep", F4 (Škabo (BS), Marlon Brutal, Dj Iron (BS) and Žobla) with hits such as "Rep i Grad" and "Bejbe Bejbe", THC (Stefan and Borko, New wave of street rap with hits such as "Trenerka Stil" and "Radi Šta Te Plaća", Sick Touch (New wave of street rap) with hits such as "Ma Da!", "Prepoznaj", "Sa bolesne strane grada" and "Uživam u Radu", Sale Tru who is known for bringing back G Funk with hits such as "U Kraju", "Chill Sine", "Tralalala" and "Ic ol gud Bejbe Bejbe", One Shot (Rolex, Mali Mire and Zli Toni) (New wave of street rap) with hits such as "Air max i 20 eura", "Problem" and "Sve vaše nove fore moje su stare ustvari" and they are making a change in Serbian Hip Hop similar to the first wave: breaking from underground and becoming popular not just in Serbia but in the whole Balkan region.

In this third wave, we have one new record label started by some underground artists, Ltdfm Music (Live To Die For My Music) launched to help artists to record and publish their own work. With a professional music studio, video production, and event team, this label has the potential to emerge as the leading story of Serbian Hip Hop Culture. Under this label are the next group and artists Biro (Stiven Drama, Code, Choda, Coa), KG Odred (Shot, Smokee, Princip, Aprill O'Neal, Fettus, Verbal, Dj Sajlent), Lider, 2Bad (Van, Fat Nack), Mlata (SickTouch), Choda Optimus (SickTouch), Sale RDZ (SickTouch), Bad Voice, Aliana, Zhozi Zho, Twokey, Smoke Mardeljano, Coa DNK, L.I.F.E. Long (NY-USA).

=== Fourth wave ===
With the global sound of hip-hop changing across the world, it also helped open the doors for many artists. Around 2012, a lot of new rappers started using auto tune. In 2014, there was a new invasion of trap music. Some rappers that are known for using this kind of style are Fox, DJEXON, Mimi Mercedez, Arafat, Ziplok, Žuti, Kurtoazija, Lil Sixxx...

The most notable person for starting this trend in Serbia is definitely Fox with his debut album "Trap Guru Trap Boss" released on November 20 of the year 2014. The Album was produced by Zhozi Zho. This was a massive success, with some of the songs like "Trap Guru Trap Boss" and "Ekser" which became huge hits.

In the year 2015. Mimi Mercedez released her debut album "Našminkam Se I Pravim Haos", which brought hits like "Prava Dama" and "Kleopatra".

Yet another trap hip-hop popularisation happened in 2016 with Surreal releasing his debut album "Surreal Drugs" with massive hits like "$ippin n $mokin" and "Indžo Sam Šino"...

A lot of new artists appeared these years, but the year 2017 was a big turning point for Serbian Hip Hop and the Fourth Wave, with new artists like Vuku, Vuya, Bula Adriano, PANAME 75, TOMMY GANG and the 15 year old Herr getting to surface and finally getting their piece of this Hip Hop cake.

Also, some of the older artists (for example FTP! with their album "Ilimunati" and their single "Milorad Dodik") started doing this new type of hip-hop.

=== Further development of Trap ===
In 2020, a Serbian rapper and producer, Lacku, released "Idealan Gas," an album which marked his stylistic shift from standard trap music to a more commercialized, dancehall-inspired sound akin to 187 Strassenbande. While this sound was nothing new in Serbia, being popularized by Jala Brat and Buba Corelli, among many more, Lacku's production style sets him apart from the rest, and he quickly gained traction with the album. Riding the wave of popularity "Idealan Gas" has brought him, Lacku dropped a string of singles throughout 2021 and 2022, and achieved further success.

In 2021, a subgenre of Trap, Drill popped as an interesting genre of Trap in Serbia. Crni Cerak, a rap group originating from Belgrade's Cerak neighborhood, gained traction in Serbia and elsewhere in the Balkans by releasing the song named "CC #1," a UK Drill styled song. The success of the single spawned "CC #2," which was used for soundtrack purposes in the movie Južni Vetar 2: Ubrzanje.

Relja Despotović, better known by his alias Seksi, a member of Crni Cerak, and Lacku got together and recorded a remix of a Maya Berović track "Honey," achieving instantaneous success, partially due to a demo of the track itself being leaked on YouTube, SoundCloud, and other platforms. The duo would go on to collaborate again in 2021 and 2022, and achieved further success by releasing a remix of Iranian-Swedish singer Arash's debut single, Boro Boro.

=== Diaspora artists ===
==== North America ====
In the late 1990s, many Serbs emigrated to Canada and the United States. Being influenced by the hip-hop scene back home, and the one in their new home, some started to create their own music.

==== Western Europe ====
There are many established Serbian rappers hailing from the Serb communities in Austria, Germany, and Sweden. One of the most famous, Toni der Assi, hails from Munich and often raps in the Serbian language and about topics concerning Serbian politics and society. In Vienna, "Ortaks", a rap group made up of Serbian youths, has grown in popularity within the German hip-hop scene, playing shows in Vienna and Zurich, Switzerland. The group is characterized by its incorporation of Serbian slang in their songs, and an anti-NATO political stance.

== Media ==
Serbian hip-hop spread very well among the media thanks to artists who were and still are active in Serbia. At one point, there was at least one radio show every day and 3 TV shows per week.

One of the most famous radio stations that had the most hip-hop shows was Radio 107.9 S.K.C. (Student Cultural Center). This same radio station helped boost many artists’ careers. Radio SKC was shut down in 2006. All the hosts worked for free, and each show had its formula.

=== Radio SKC 107.9 ===
Radio SKC was an urban radio station and the home of the major radio hip-hop shows. Radio SKC was a very small two-floor house. Some rooms were used for a studio for people like Marko Nastić, Bad Copy, and Shazalakazoo.

==== Sindikalni Termin, Sunday 21:00–23:00 Radio SKC 107.9 ====
Over the years, this show has changed its formula. In the beginning, all the Beogradski Sindikat members used to host it (9 members).

Their approach was to joke around in the beginning with made-up scenarios with their call-up listeners, but after the first year, the formula changed.

In the 2nd year, only Škabo hosted it. In the 3rd year, Edesi members hosted it since Škabo had to do army time for 1 year.

In the last year, it was Škabo again, but with a lower rating since the show was not like it was when it started. Sindikalni Termin is most known for playing demos and having demo artists as guests.

==== Škola, Wednesday 17:00–19:00 Radio SKC 107.9 ====
2002–2006 Originally, this spot time was with Timbe. At one point, Timbe was very busy and let Trial host it since he also filled in for Sindikalini Termina a few times and for the Ekipa Stigla show at b92. He substituted for around 4 shows where Timbe decided to let him continue his work and formula.

The Škola show was a place for people to get educated about hip-hop. It never played any songs twice in the 4-year period unless it was the summer period (60 days). No demo artist was allowed at his show; releasing an album in Serbia and Montenegro was the only way to get to be a guest on his show.

The show had a few artists to guest like: Rza, Guru, Jungle Brothers, Sole (hip-hop artist), L Rock...and over 30 artists from Serbia and Montenegro.

Škola also prepared a mixtape with freestyles from all its guests that was recorded off-air. The mixtape was never released, but Don Trialeon said he will release in the year 2026 (20 years since the shutdown of radio skc). The show aired until radio SKC was closed down.

==== Timbetovo vece, KiK Het Sner, Ručkak sa Timetom....Radio SKC 107.9 ====
Timbe used to hang around a lot at Radio SKC. Also, the Bad Copy studio was in one of the rooms at the SKC, so Timbe had a lot of radio shows over the years. Most of his radio shows were on air for a few months.

=== Television ===
There were a few TV shows that played hip-hop videos and interviewed local Serbian artists.

==== Reprezent, 3 Kanal, Once A Week ====
2001–2003 Reprezent was a TV show hosted by Deda (Marko Đurić). Deda is a member of Beogradski Sindikat. His focus was on the local scene and on the French and American underground scene. He also got to interview Das EFX and Guru (rapper).

=== Internet Portals ===
Radio-SKC, after the second burning, destroying the whole studio, SKC continued to work as an internet portal for a few years, closing very soon after the burn.

== Festivals ==
Over the years, Serbia had many Hip Hop festivals. Most of these festivals were summer festivals that would go on for a few days.

Many festivals never got to see the 2nd year due to the fact that the organizers could not find a sponsor to finance their festival.

=== Svi Kao Jedan ===
Svi Kao Jedan festival started in 2011, and it has been going for 7 years. It is a summer festival which would go on for a few days in Belgrade.

Till now, it had over 300 local artists as well as American artists like: Onyx, Afu-Ra, Kurtis Blow, and DJ Tomekk.

In May 2014, Obrenovac, a Serbian town, suffered heavy damage from unprecedented floods. In June 2014, Svi Kao Jedan was a one-day humanitarian concert with around 20 artists raising money for Obrenovac.

== See also ==
- Rasta
- Coby
- Elitni Odredi
- Juice (Serbian rapper)
- Gru (rapper)
- Music of Serbia
