= Ajs Nigrutin =

Serbian rapper and actor (born 1977)

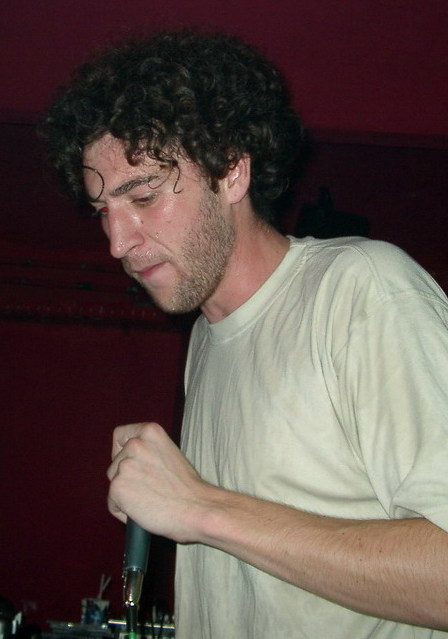
- Ajs Nigrutin in 2003

Background information
- Born: Vladan Aksentijević; 12 August 1977 (age 49); Belgrade, SR Serbia, Yugoslavia
- Genres: Hip-hop; Comedy hip-hop
- Occupations: Rapper; actor
- Years active: 1996–present
- Labels: One Records; Multimedia Records; Kaseta Digital
- Member of: Bad Copy

Vladan Aksentijević (Serbian: Владан Аксентијевић; born 12 August 1977), known professionally as Ajs Nigrutin, is a Serbian rapper and actor. He is a founding member of the Belgrade hip-hop group Bad Copy, with which he has recorded since 1996, and has released five solo studio albums, from Nigrutinski rečeno (2002) to Ti si Ajs Nigrutin (2024).

Known for humorous and often explicit lyrics, self-parody and absurdist wordplay, Aksentijević has also recorded collaborative albums with Bvana, Wikluh Sky and Smoke Mardeljano, and was featured on Gru's 2010 single "I dalje me žele". Outside music, he finished as runner-up in the second celebrity season of the Serbian edition of Big Brother in 2008 and has made occasional film and television appearances.

== Early life ==
Aksentijević was born on 12 August 1977 in Belgrade, then part of the Socialist Federal Republic of Yugoslavia. He grew up in Kotež, a neighbourhood of Belgrade, where he became childhood friends with Rašid Kurtanović, later known as Timbe. According to Kurtanović, the two lived approximately 100 metres apart and spent much of their childhood together, fishing at a nearby canal and playing sports; Aksentijević also played basketball in his youth.

He developed an interest in music and writing at an early age; his aunt recalled that he wrote a poem for her while in the first grade of primary school. Kurtanović described how Aksentijević and his friends began experimenting with music on a turntable brought home by Aksentijević's father, playing instrumental records, improvising rap performances and making amateur recordings in the mid-1990s.

Aksentijević trained as a motor vehicle mechanic, although in a 2010 interview he stated that he had never worked professionally in that trade.

== Career ==
=== 1996–2008: Bad Copy and early solo work ===
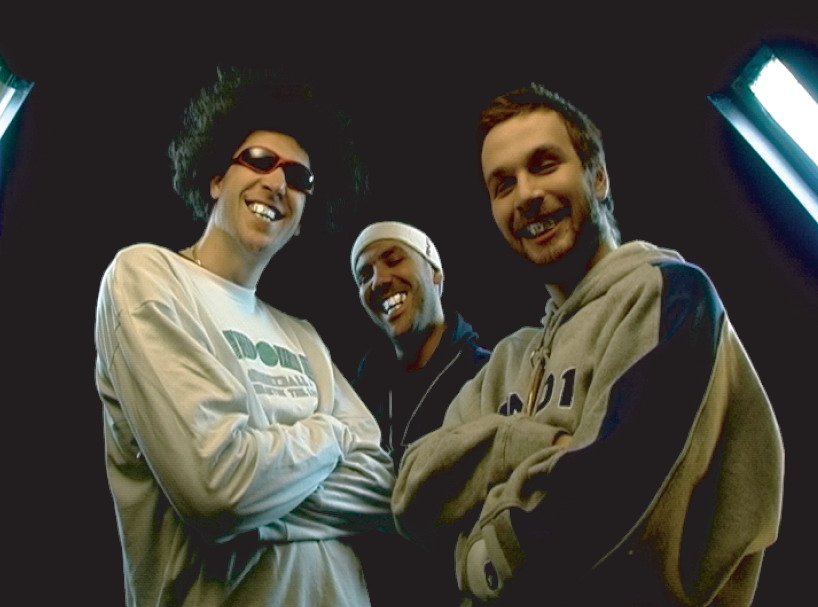
Ajs Nigrutin (left), Timbe (centre) and Wikluh Sky (right)

In 1996, Aksentijević formed the hip-hop group Bad Copy with Milan Šaponja, known as Miki Boj, and the duo released their debut album, Orbod mebej, that year. After Šaponja's death in 1999 the group went on hiatus; Aksentijević was joined by Timbe and Wikluh Sky in 2000, establishing the trio's subsequent line-up.

Before becoming a full-time musician, Aksentijević worked as a technician at Radio SKC in Belgrade for about three and a half years, using the station's equipment after working hours to record his early songs and his debut solo album, Nigrutinski rečeno, released in 2002. Bad Copy released Sve sami hedovi in 2003 and Najgori do sada in 2006, albums that developed the group's humorous and satirical approach to hip-hop.

In 2004, Aksentijević and Timbe released the compilation Sve same barabe under the name 43zla, featuring contributions from other regional hip-hop artists including Prti Bee Gee, Bvana and Wikluh Sky. His second solo album, Štrokavi pazuh, followed in 2005. His third, Kajmak i katran (2008), was distributed through newspaper kiosks in Serbia and promoted with a music video for "Papučar Dži", directed by Đolo Đolo of Beogradski Sindikat; guest performers included Timbe and Wikluh Sky.

In early 2008, Aksentijević and Wikluh Sky took part in the second celebrity season of Veliki Brat VIP, in which Aksentijević finished as runner-up. Bad Copy stopped working together later that year, and its members concentrated on individual projects.

=== 2009–2014: Collaborations and Bad Copy reunion ===
In 2009, Aksentijević released the collaborative album Fujznem Džigili with Bvana through Multimedia Records. The following year he was featured on Gru's single "I dalje me žele", whose music video, directed by Marko Gligorijević, was filmed in Belgrade and premiered on MTV on 30 August 2010.

Aksentijević and Wikluh Sky also recorded together as Mononukleozni rođaci; their album Priče iz hibernacije was released as a free download in May 2011.

Bad Copy reunited for a performance at the Svi kao jedan hip-hop festival in 2012. In April 2013, the group released Krigle, its first studio album since 2006; the 22-track album was initially available for free streaming on MTV's regional websites.

=== 2015–present: Later solo work ===
In June 2015, Aksentijević released his fourth solo studio album, Akupunktura govneta, his first in seven years. The 20-track album featured guest appearances by Wikluh Sky, Mikri Maus, Eufrat and other Serbian hip-hop performers, and was initially made available through Bad Copy's official YouTube channel.

After another period of limited activity, Bad Copy released the single "Prazan disko" in 2019, by which time its members were mainly involved in separate projects while continuing to perform together. In November 2022, Aksentijević and Smoke Mardeljano released the 14-track collaborative album Kad goveda utihnu, which included the previously released songs "Piletina ispod sača" and "Umro je trep".

In February 2023, Aksentijević performed "Ženo zla", an auto-tuned folk song heard in the television series Složna braća: The Next Đeneration, under the pseudonym Blaško Oktava; he had previously used the alias Ajs Nigucci for the parody song "Abu Dhabi". In November 2023, he released the single "Ćiribu ćiriba" with Croatian rapper Grga Čvarak, which he described as their third song together. In August 2024, he and Smoke Mardeljano were featured on "Čavudinski pokidano", the lead single from an upcoming album by veteran Serbian rapper Kiza RH (Slobodan Kuzmanovski).

On 4 December 2024, Aksentijević released his fifth solo studio album, Ti si Ajs Nigrutin. The 12-track album features Marčelo, Mikri Maus, Noyz and members of Bad Copy. That month, Bad Copy discussed their past releases and plans for new music in an interview ahead of a concert at Belgrade's Zappa Baza venue.

In March 2025, the Croatian daily Jutarnji list reported that Aksentijević and Timbe had been fined and given a three-month ban on entering the European Union after inspectors attended their 8 March performance at a club in Osijek and found that they reportedly lacked the required work permits; the fine was paid by the event's organiser. Their Zagreb concert scheduled for 8 May was consequently moved to 16 October 2025. Bad Copy were among the performers announced for the 2026 edition of the Nisomnia festival at the Niš Fortress, held on 19–20 June.

== Artistry and reception ==
Aksentijević's music is characterised by humorous and often explicit lyrics, self-parody, unconventional wordplay and references to everyday situations. In a 2008 review for Popboks, music critic Uroš Smiljanić highlighted his distinctive diction, deliberate manipulation of Serbian grammar and use of absurd scenarios, and described the production on Kajmak i katran as combining samples of Serbian folk music with minimalist, psychedelic loops and occasional turntable scratching.

Critical reception of his recordings has varied. Smiljanić rated Kajmak i katran 3 out of 10, arguing that it relied excessively on familiar jokes and themes without substantially developing Aksentijević's approach. He gave Fujznem Džigili 6 out of 10, considering it an improvement over both artists' preceding solo releases. Reviewing Ti si Ajs Nigrutin for Danas, writer Marko Vidojković praised the album's humour, particularly the interplay between Aksentijević and Marčelo on "Marčelo me traži". In Mladina, Slovenian critic Borja Borka identified humour, vulgarity and absurd storytelling as recurring elements of Aksentijević's work and noted the album's range of styles, including electronic-influenced production, boom bap and elements associated with the American hip-hop collective Griselda; although he found some of the material repetitive, he praised Aksentijević's continued ability to entertain.

In March 2026, the Museum of Contemporary Art Belgrade opened an exhibition by artist Predrag Terzić titled Danas je taj dan kada niko nije poneo loptu…, after a line from Aksentijević's song "Basketi bez lopte". Terzić said the lyric had helped him frame the exhibition's themes of basketball, public space and society.

== Personal life ==
In September 2014, Aksentijević confirmed that he and his partner were expecting a child, and expressed a preference for keeping his family life out of the public eye. He became a father in April 2015. By 2019, he had moved from Belgrade to Subotica, where he ran a private business alongside his musical activities.

== Discography ==
=== Solo studio albums ===
- Nigrutinski rečeno (2002, One Records)
- Štrokavi pazuh (2005, One Records)
- Kajmak i katran (2008, One Records)
- Akupunktura govneta (2015)
- Ti si Ajs Nigrutin (2024, Kaseta Digital)

=== With Bad Copy ===
- Orbod mebej (1996, ITMM)
- Sve sami hedovi (2003, One Records)
- Najgori do sada (2006, Prohibicija)
- Krigle (2013, Mascom Records)

=== Collaborative albums and compilations ===
- Sve same barabe (2004, One Records) – compilation, as 43zla with Timbe
- Fujznem Džigili (2009, Multimedia Records) – with Bvana
- Priče iz hibernacije (2011) – with Wikluh Sky, as Mononukleozni rođaci
- Kad goveda utihnu (2022, SMOKED Records / Kaseta Digital) – with Smoke Mardeljano

=== Selected singles and guest appearances ===
- "I dalje me žele" (2010) – Gru featuring Ajs Nigrutin
- "Ženo zla" (2023) – as Blaško Oktava
- "Ćiribu ćiriba" (2023) – with Grga Čvarak
- "Čavudinski pokidano" (2024) – Kiza RH featuring Ajs Nigrutin and Smoke Mardeljano

== Filmography ==
=== Film ===
Year	Title	Role	Notes
2014	Rio 2	Voice	Serbian-language dub
2025	Poslednji krug momci	Guest appearance	Action comedy directed by Ilija Stojimirović

=== Television ===
Year	Title	Role	Notes
2008	Veliki Brat VIP	Himself	Contestant; runner-up
2008	Operacija trijumf	Himself	Guest performer with Wikluh Sky during the fourth gala
