= Mina Kostić =

Serbian turbo-folk singer (born 1975)

Mina Kostić Мина Костић
- Born: Minira Jašari; 5 May 1975 (age 51); Orašje, SR Bosnia and Herzegovina, SFR Yugoslavia
- Genre: Turbo-folk
- Occupation: Singer
- Years active: 2000–present

Jasmina "Mina" Kostić (Serbian Cyrillic: Јасмина "Мина" Костић; born Minira Jašari, Serbian Cyrillic: Минира Јашари, on 5 May 1975) is a Bosnian-Serbian turbo-folk singer.

== Early and personal life ==
Mina Kostić was born as Minira Jašari in Orašje in Bosnia and Herzegovina and raised in the Ledine neighbourhood of Belgrade in a Romani family of 10 children. She was adopted at 5 years of age by Evdokija "Duda" Ivanović. Her cousin is rapper Juice, whose paternal aunt is Duda Ivanović. She changed her name when she was 19 in order to pay less for an Italian visa, together with her brother Enver who changed his name to Dejan.

Her former partner is singer Igor Kostić, whom she dated from December 2007 until shortly after becoming parents to a daughter, Anastasija (born February 2009).

== Career ==
Kostić has made many television appearances and performances, three albums, and is working on a fourth. She is known for an often provocative stage appearance, which occasionally attracts media comment.

She has sung as guest at many high-profile birthday parties of Serbian celebrities such as: Dejan Stanković, Siniša Mihajlović, and Mateja Kežman.

The song "Ljubav" from her 2005 album Muziku pojačaj went viral on TikTok in 2026 due to a viral video of Aleksandra Prijović singing it. Following the success, the song peaked atop Billboard's Croatia Songs chart.

== Discography ==
=== Studio albums ===
- Srčani udar (2000)
- No Comment (2002)
- Muziku pojačaj (2005)
