= Da li imaš pravo? =

Studio album by Gru
- Released: 1995
- Recorded: October – December 1994
- Genre: Funk, hip hop
- Length: 42:18
- Label: Jugodisk

Gru chronology
| Da li imaš pravo? (1995) | Gru 2 (1996) |

Da li imaš pravo? is the debut studio album by Serbian recording artist and producer Gru. With production done by Jugodisk and City Records, this album marked the first wave of Serbian hip-hop. The album was certified gold in Serbia, and included the eponymous song Da li imaš pravo, which was a number one song on the Serbian charts for 5 consecutive weeks.

Recorded between 24 October until 10 December 1994, the album's chart-topping songs include Da li imaš pravo, Pravo u raj, Geto and Život je lep, which was done as a duet with retired musician Mario Rajić, better known as Enco.

== Track listing ==
| No. | Title | Lyrics | Music | Length |
|---|---|---|---|---|
| 1. | "Gru In" ("Gru In") | D. Andonov | D. Andonov | 3:18 |
| 2. | "Da li imaš pravo" ("Do You Have The Right") | D. Andonov | D. Andonov | 3:59 |
| 3. | "M.F. Gru" ("M.F. Gru") | D. Andonov | D. Andonov | 3:42 |
| 4. | "Zašto sam tu" ("Why Am I Here") | D. Andonov | D. Andonov | 4:16 |
| 5. | "Pravo u raj" ("Right to Heaven") | D. Andonov | D. Andonov | 3:26 |
| 6. | "Geto" ("Ghetto") | D. Andonov | D. Andonov | 3:02 |
| 7. | "Život nije uvek lep" ("Life Isn't Always Beautiful") | D. Andonov | D. Andonov | 3:28 |
| 8. | "Samo novi dani" ("Only New Days") | D. Andonov | D. Andonov | 4:19 |
| 9. | "On je lud" ("He's Crazy") | D. Andonov | D. Andonov | 4:57 |
| 10. | "Uzmi pare I beži" ("Take the Cash and Run") | D. Andonov | D. Andonov | 4:14 |
| 11. | "Oseti žurbu" ("Feel the Rush") | D. Andonov | D. Andonov | 4:04 |
| 12. | "Gru Out" ("Gru Out") | D. Andonov | D. Andonov | 3:48 |
| 13. | ""Život je lep"" ("Life is Beautiful") | D. Andonov, M. Rajić | D. Andonov | 2:58 |

== Reception ==
This album received generally positive reviews from critics, including Serbian music critic and producer Dragan Pajović, who described this album as "an eclectic approach to music by combining genres of funk and rap". Musicians Leontina Vukomanović and Nenad Jovanović have praised the album for the songs Geto and On je lud, for the aspect of merging funk and hip-hop.

== See also ==
- Music of Serbia
