= Darko Kostić =

Serbian fashion designer

Darko Kostić (Serbian Cyrillic: Дарко Костић; born 1980 in Belgrade) is a famous Serbian fashion designer. His fall/winter 2014 collection of silver and steel grey dresses was premiered in photos in an underground parking lot. In 2018, he was accused of sexually assaulting a 15-year-old boy in his apartment and arrested afterwards.
