= Bad Copy =

Serbian hip-hop band

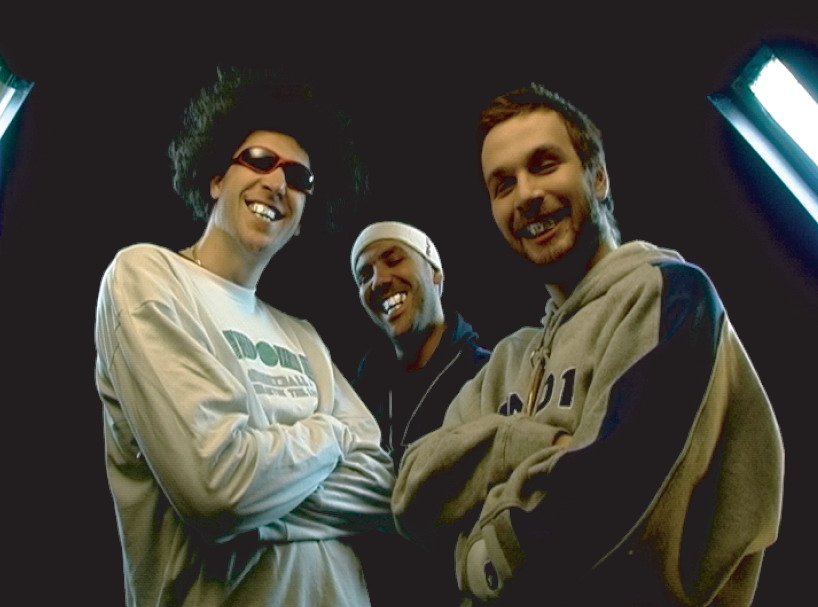
- Bad Copy members in 2005.

Background information
- Origin: Belgrade, Serbia, FR Yugoslavia
- Genres: Hip-hop, comedy rap
- Years active: 1996–2008, 2012–present
- Labels: One Records; Prohibicija; ITMM
- Members: Ajs Nigrutin; Wikluh Sky; Timbe
- Past members: Miki Boj

Bad Copy are a hip-hop trio group from Belgrade, Serbia known for their humorous lyrics and slang. The members are Ajs Nigrutin (stage name of Vladan Aksentijević), Wikluh Sky (Đorđe Miljenović) and Timbe (Rašid Kurtanović). Miki Boj, born Milan Šaponja, was active in the band until his death in 1999. They have released several albums as a group and as solo artists and helped the popularization of hip-hop in Serbia and Ex-Yugoslavia in the new millennium.

== History ==
The group started off as a duo consisting of Ajs Nigrutin and Miki Boj. Their first album Orbod mebej, got released by ITMM in 1996, mostly contained comical songs rapped over instrumentals from popular American rap acts such as Method Man and Naughty By Nature. The standout track was "Zabaci domaćine", which turned Coolio's Gangsta's Paradise into a song about a fishing trip gone wrong. The album failed to get much media attention, but it established them a cult following.

The death of Miki Boj in a war in Kosovo in 1999 resulted in a hiatus that lasted a few years. The group was then composed of Ajs Nigrutin and Timbe, with Wikluh Sky joining later. Songs recorded in that period showed major improvement over their early efforts, developing their rapping skills drastically while still keeping trademark irreverent lyrics. They joined forces with Oneya, then an up-and-coming beatmaker who was working on starting the first Serbian hip-hop label, Bassivity. They had a very prolific collaboration, recording many songs but none of them ever getting released. By the end of 2002, dissatisfied with initially agreed schedule of their album being released only after V.I.P., Oneya and Shorty even though they weren't the first ones with a fully recorded album, they wanted to end their contract with Bassivity. Eventually they were dropped with no penalties by the label. Many of the recorded songs were later leaked to the internet, while almost none were released on other Bassivity projects.

=== Sve sami hedovi ===
Recording all-new material in a radio station studio during the first half of 2003, the group released their second album Sve sami hedovi for the One Records label. The album had a specific lo-fi sound as a result of being recorded and mastered in less-than-perfect ghetto conditions, but it was a huge hit for a short time on the strength of the first single, "Uno Due Tre", produced by Ajs Nigrutin, with most of the song lyrics consisting of unconnected Italian or Italian-sounding words and phrases (some copied off of shampoo labels and clothing tags), and with a very low-budget video recorded by Đolođolo of Beogradski sindikat in the old town of Budva.

The second single "Možeš ti to" (You can do it) featuring explicit lyrics describing various sexual acts, also produced by Wikluh Sky and also with a video by Đolođolo, was moderately successful. Featuring Bitcharke na travi (Bitches on grass) as guests vocally, the track predictably didn't get much airplay due to excessive profanity.

In total, Sve sami hedovi sold more than 5,000 copies, which is considered a moderate success in the current state of music in Serbia and Montenegro and Bassivity Music as a head-to-head competition.

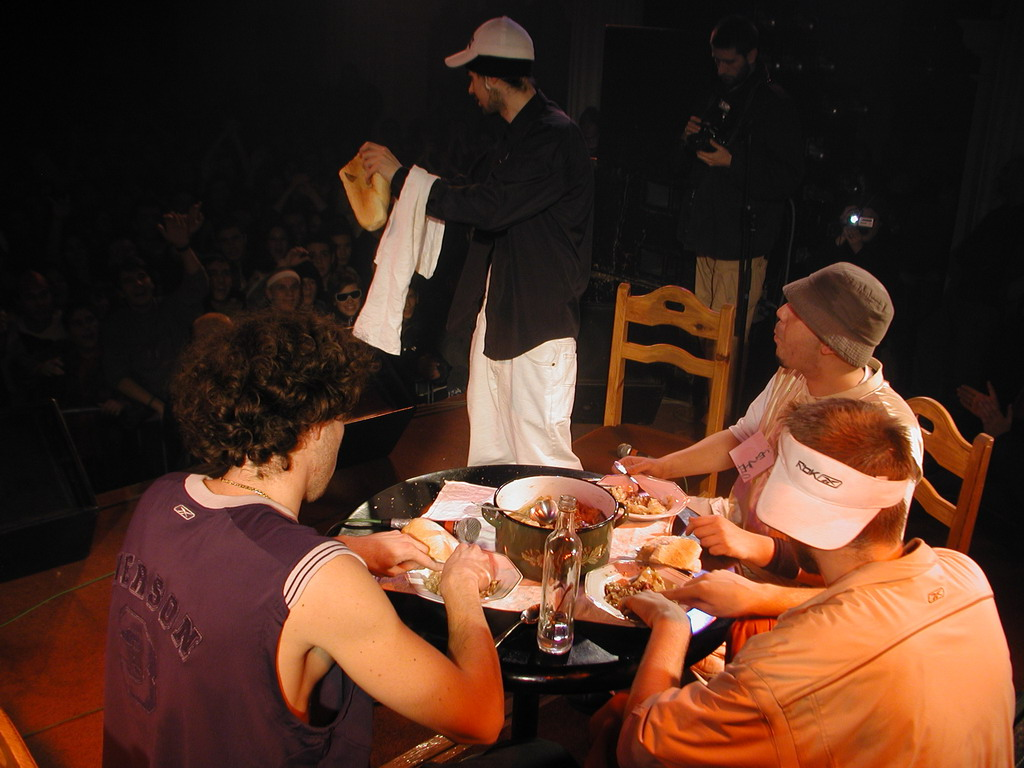
The members of Bad Copy eating sarma onstage at their 2003 concert in Belgrade.

Thematically, the album contained an abundance of food-related lyrics (a trend they would maintain in subsequent projects), most prominently in the song "Sarma spremna" (Sarma is done). A particularly memorable performance of this song took place at their biggest concert up to that point, the 2003 show at the SKC in Belgrade, where they carried a table and a pot of sarma onto the stage, ate it in front of the audience and handed it out to the front rows. That show in front of 1,200 people turned out to be the beginning of the band's more commercially successful phase as they started drawing larger crowds and getting more exposure in the media.

=== Najgori do sada ===
The third Bad Copy album, entitled Najgori do sada (The Worst Yet), was released in December 2006. Guests on the album include Škabo, Bvana, Edo Maajka, and Gospodar Vremena. The first song to get a video was "Žoor," directed by Đolođolo. The second single was "Idemo odma", also directed by Đolođolo.

=== Krigle ===
After Bad Copy disbanded in 2008, they have reformed again in 2012 and started touring. In 2013, they published their fourth album Krigle (Beer Steins), with videos for tracks Esi mi dobar and Ljubav ili pivo.

== Other projects ==
All three members of the group have recorded solo albums, with Timjah's being the only one not getting a release due to an early leak to the internet.

Ajs Nigrutin has released four albums, Nigrutinski rečeno-Štrokavi Mozak in 2002, Štrokavi pazuh in 2005, Kajmak i katran in 2008 and Akupunktura Govneta in 2015

Wikluh Sky is the most productive member, constantly working on multiple projects, many of them outside of hip-hop, but seldom releasing them. Among his works are one reggae album with the group Shappa (with Coyote of the band Eyesburn); a punk album with the band Jogurt; a rock opera called Zagađenje u Japanu (A Pollution in Japan) about a transvestite turbo-folk star, written for the EXIT festival in 2005; a solo rap albums called Zašto brate Vikler? (2004) and Ortaci ne znaju (2007). He's also made the soundtrack for "A Serbian Film" called "Pazi Sta Radis" (Be Careful").

Ajs Nigrutin and Timjah have released a compilation of songs under the name 43zla – Sve same barabe in 2004, with a list of guests including their young protégés Blind Business and Kibu, long-time collaborators Prti Bee Gee and Bvana, and others such as Who See. Most recently, Ajs Nigrutin and Wikluh Sky serious argue have led to the disintegration of Bad Copy. Ajs Nigrutin accused Wikluh Sky for his soft music turn-over, like working on some popular pop singers (Ana Stanic) and his unsatisfied dedication to group (they recently start to work on their new album).

Members of Bad Copy have also done songs with many other Balkan hip-hop artists, among which are Gru, Marčelo, Beogradski sindikat, Edo Maajka, Bauk Squad, V.I.P. (and other Bassivity artists) etc.

== Discography ==
- Orbod Mebej (1996, ITMM)
- Sve sami hedovi (2003, One Records)
- Najgori do sada (2006, Prohibicija)
- Krigle (2013, Mascom)

== See also ==
- Serbian hip-hop
