= Niggor =

Montenegrin hip-hop artist (born 1971)

Igor Lazić (born 16 February 1971), known by the stage name Niggor, is a Montenegrin hip-hop and electronic artist, best known as the member of hip hop duo Monteniggers.

He started doing music with his friend Nebojša Saveljić "Nebo" when they formed the hip hop duo "Monteniggers". They released two albums and at the peak of their career Saveljić died in a car accident, causing Igor to go on a hiatus for a few years. In the meantime he recorded a few songs with his friend, pop singer Vlado Georgiev, and after few years of inactivity, he came up with the new stage name, Niggor, for his solo career as a house music producer.

He also had a minor role in the movies A View from the Eiffel Tower and Zlatne Čaklje.

== Albums ==
=== With Monteniggers ===
- Tajna marenda (1996)
- Allboom (1998)

=== Solo ===
- Dog On a Needle (2003)
