= Monteniggers =

Hip-hop band from Montenegro (Yugoslavia) (1994–1999)

- Origin: Kotor, FR Yugoslavia (modern-day Montenegro)
- Genres: Hip hop
- Years active: 1994–1999
- Labels: Komuna Belgrade
- Members: Igor Lazić Niggor; Nebojša Saveljić Nebo; Duško Nikolić Ducka

Monteniggers was a hip-hop band from Kotor, Montenegro, then part of FR Yugoslavia. The band originally consisted of Igor Lazić, Nebojša Saveljić, and Duško Nikolić, also known under the pseudonyms "Lucky Boy", "Sky", and "Ducka", respectively. Nikolić soon got ill and couldn't perform, though he continued to co-write songs.

Even though the band's period of activity is generally taken to be 1994–1999, the band was actually formed in 1988 under the name "Brake Boys". One year later they changed the name to AE:Tell me, and then changed it yet again to Monteniggers.

In 1996, soon after the release of their debut album Tajna marenda Nikolić died of leukemia, prompting the two other members to release a song dedicated to him on their second album, Allboom in 1998, called "Voljeli bi da si tu" ("We Wish You Were Here"). That same year (1996) they had their first live performance on a music festival in Budva, performing the song "Mala plava" ("Little Blondie"), immediately catching the attention of the public. A song from the debut album called "Ducka Diesel" was even voted song of the year in 1996. In June 1997, they recorded what would eventually become one of their signature songs and arguably their best known, "So i tekila" ("Salt and Tequila"), which was famous mostly due to its catchy and memorable chorus. The band's success and popularity was growing rapidly, to the point where they became one of the most beloved hip-hop bands in ex-Yugoslavia.

On 31 October 1999, at the peak of their popularity, Saveljić died in a car crash on the road from Podgorica to Cetinje when the car hit a cliff. His girlfriend Vanja and friend Aco also died in the crash, while the driver Miloš and front passenger Jeca were injured. His death marked the definite end of the Monteniggers. Since two out of the three members died, stories and rumors about the "curse of the Monteniggers" persisted for many years after that. The sole remaining member, Igor Lazić, is now a successful solo artist better known as Niggor.

== Sky Forever ==
After Nebo's death, Igor Lazić formed the foundation "Sky Forever", whose primary goal was campaigning against drunk driving and preventing increasingly frequent car accidents in Montenegro during that time. In 2000, he and Vlado Georgiev (a friend of Niggor, another famous singer who was unknown at the time) released a single dedicated to Saveljić which had the same name as the campaign's slogan. Its main campaign slogan, and therefore the name of the song, was "Ne brže od života" ("Not faster than life"). Billboards with the same slogan were placed at all the critical accident points throughout the country. They also organised a number of concerts and sporting events in order to promote their agenda and finance their struggle. The foundation lasted a few years, and succeeded in changing road traffic laws.

== Albums ==
- Tajna marenda (1996)
- Allboom (1998)
