= Jugodisk =

- Founded: 1968
- Genre: Various
- Country of origin: Serbia
- Location: Belgrade

Jugodisk was a record label was established in 1968, in the then Socialist Republic of Serbia in SFR Yugoslavia in Belgrade, today Serbia. Before 1981, it was known as Beograd Disk. In 2003, the company was sold at a state auction to the show business manager Nenad Kapor and since then it operates as Jugodisk A.D. (joint stock company).

== History ==
Jugodisk was established in 1968, in the Socialist Republic of Serbia federal unit of SFR Yugoslavia under the name Beograd Disk. In 1981, the company changed its name to Jugodisk as a portmanteau word of Jugoslavija (Yugoslavia) and disk (for a vinyl record).

In 2003, the company was sold at a state auction to the show business manager Nenad Kapor and since then it operates as Jugodisk A.D. (joint stock company)

The label should not be confused with another label named Jugodisk, which was formed in the 1950s and issued 78 rpm records with Yugoslav folk and popular music, but soon ended the activity.

== Media formats and distribution ==
Since 1981, the phonographic production of the newly restructured Jugodisk had been published in two formats ‐ vinyl records and cassette tapes. Since 1992, the company moved from the production of vinyl records over to the production of Compact Disks (CDs).

== Artists ==
The company is notable for signing several prominent former Yugoslav pop and rock artists, as well as several prominent Yugoslav folk artists. Some of the artist that have been signed to Jugodisk, include:

- Aleksandar Makedonski
- Alisa
- Badmingtons
- Baja Mali Knindža
- Balkan
- Haris Džinović
- Griva
- Gru
- Srđan Marjanović
- Radomir Mihajlović
- Oktobar 1864
- Hanka Paldum
- Partibrejkers
- Rok Mašina
- Sanjalice
- Slomljena Stakla
- Boba Stefanović
- Sunshine
- Šaban Šaulić
- Tunel
- U škripcu
- Hari Varešanović

Like other former Yugoslav labels, Jugodisk was also licensed to release foreign titles for the Yugoslav market which included certain albums and singles by: The Animals, Bad Manners, Shirley Bassey, The Beat, George Benson, Black Sabbath, Johnny Cash, The Fall, Gerry and the Pacemakers, Eddy Grant, Bill Haley & His Comets, Roy Harper, Jimmy Page, The Kinks, Matchbox, The Moody Blues, Willie Nelson, The Alan Parsons Project, Dolly Parton, Wilson Pickett, Iggy Pop, Chris Rea, Stray Cats, Toyah, Wishbone Ash and The Yardbirds.

== Competition ==
Other major labels in the former Socialist Federal Republic of Yugoslavia were: PGP-RTB from Belgrade, Jugoton and Suzy from Zagreb, Diskoton from Sarajevo, ZKP RTVLJ from Ljubljana, Diskos from Aleksandrovac, and others.

== See also ==
- List of record labels
