= Komuna (company) =

Serbian media company

Komuna (full legal name: Komuna-International mešovito preduzeće za unutrašnju i spoljnu trgovinu d.o.o. Beograd) is a Serbian record label and media production company. Established in 1985, its headquarters are in Belgrade, Serbia with a branch office Budva, Montenegro. Registered in the Belgrade municipality of Rakovica, the company is owned by Maksa Ćatović.

== Film and television production ==
The main scope of Komuna involves audiovisual productions: films, television programs, commercials, live transmissions and music videos. Komuna delivers full support and assistance to foreign production companies interested in shooting in former Yugoslavia and Bulgaria.

Komuna was involved in production films like Savior by Predrag Antonijević, Underground and Black Cat, White Cat by Emir Kusturica, Normal People by Oleg Novković, Barking at the Stars by Zdravko Šotra, The Red Colored Grey Truck by Srđan Koljević, and others. In realization of these films Komuna co-operated with production companies from the United States (Savior), as well as companies from Germany and France (Underground, Black Cat, White Cat, Normal People and The Red Colored Grey Truck).

From the very beginning Komuna has provided a wide range of services to the Radio Television of Serbia. With RTS, Komuna produced popular TV series like Porodično blago (62 episodes), Stižu dolari (52 episodes), Svaštara Duška Radovića (13 episodes), Lisice (18 episodes) and Neki novi klinci (15 episodes).

== Record publishing ==
Some of the artist that have been signed to the label include:

- Amajlija
- Apsolutno Romantično
- Dragana Mirković
- Bajaga i Instruktori
- Goran Bregović
- Gru
- Dejan Cukić & Spori Ritam Band
- Zdravko Čolić
- Nikola Čuturilo
- Familija
- Instant Karma
- Jugosloveni
- Aleksandra Kovač
- Kornelije Kovač
- Laboratorija Zvuka
- Love Hunters
- Oliver Mandić
- Piloti
- Laza Ristovski & Aleksandar Lokner
- Rambo Amadeus
- Rambo Amadeus & Goran Vejvoda
- Smak
- Sunshine
- S Vremena Na Vreme
- Vampiri
