= Beogradski Sindikat =

Serbian hip-hop collective

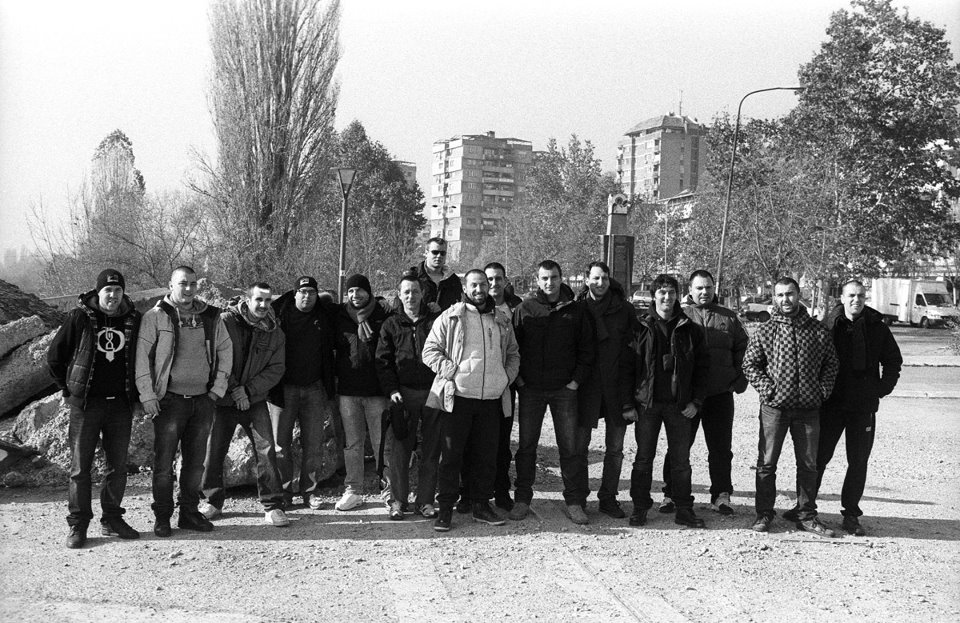
- Beogradski Sindikat in Kosovska Mitrovica

Background information
- Also known as: UPHKSBS (Udruženje poklonika hip hop kulture Srbije - Beogradski sindikat); Džukački Sindikat
- Origin: Belgrade, Serbia
- Genres: Hardcore hip hop Political hip hop Serbian hip hop
- Years active: 1999–present
- Labels: Prohibicija; Automatik Records
- Members: Blažo; Ogi; Děda B Darko; Škabo; Dajs; MC Flex; Šef Sale; Krym; DJ IRon
- Website: beogradskisindikat.com

Beogradski Sindikat (Serbian Cyrillic: Београдски синдикат, lit. 'Belgrade Syndicate') is a Serbian hip-hop collective from Belgrade, Serbia. Beogradski Sindikat is one of the pioneers of the second wave of Serbian hip-hop. The band is known for its socially critical lyrics, especially in relation to political corruption, propaganda and bad governance in Serbia and the Balkans. Other main themes are the idealization of friendly togetherness, a sense of belonging to the city of Belgrade, and patriotism towards Serbian culture and the Serbian Orthodox Church, as well as the rejection of foreign political influence on Serbia. Due to their critical nature, Milo Đukanović, the president of Montenegro, called the group's lyrics an insult to honor.

== History ==
It was formed on March 21, 1999, by uniting two underground hip-hop bands: Red Zmaja (Order of the Dragon) and TUMZ (Tehnika Upravljanja Mikrofonom i Znanjem) together with solo artists MC Flex (Feđa) and Šef Sale. Prota and DJ IRon then joined the group in 2004 and 2006 respectively. They have released three albums, the first one was highly acclaimed and marked the beginning of the second wave of Serbian hip hop. They own their record label, Prohibicija.

After a five-year break, Beogradski Sindikat was back in November 2015 with a new single, "BS Armija". Beogradski Sindikat will be releasing new songs in form of "singles" in the future. They will not release anymore songs in form of an "album" for now. On Saturday 28 April 2012, they held a full house concert in Belgrade arena which is also their biggest concert ever. At last, Beogradski Sindikat released the album Sindikalno Proleće on 12 June 2023.

== Political and social commitment ==
They distinguished themselves as a very committed group, with sharp political views and a strong patriotic note in their songs. Feđa Dimović, one of the leaders of the Belgrade Syndicate, a lawyer by profession, sharply criticized the Brussels agreement. They performed in prisons and detention centers throughout Serbia. BS criticizes NATO countries such as the United States and the European Union. The dissatisfaction with the separation of Kosovo from Serbia resonates strongly in their work.

== Group members ==
- Žobla - MC (b. Blažo Vujović)
- Ogi - MC (b. Ognjen Janković)
- Deda - MC, producer (born Marko Đurić)
- Dare - MC (b. Darko Marjanović)
- Škabo - MC, producer (b. Boško Ćirković)
- Đolo Đolo - MC, video director, producer (b. Đorđe Jovanović)
- Dajs - MC (b. Vladimir Ćorluka)
- Feđa - MC, producer (b. Feđa Dimović)
- Šef Sale - MC, producer (b. Aleksandar Karadžinović)
- IRon - DJ (b. Stefan Novović)
- Prota - DJ, producer (b. Aleksandar Protić)

== Discography ==
=== Albums ===
- 2001: BSSST...Tišinčina
- 2005: Svi Zajedno
- 2010: Diskretni Heroji
- 2023: Sindikalno Proleće
- 2025: El Salvador

=== EPs ===
- 2002: Govedina
- 2006: Oni Su

=== Singles ===
- 2002: Govedina
- 2006: Oni su
- 2015: BS Armija
- 2016: Sistem te laže
- 2016: Kasno je
- 2017: Sindikalna priča
- 2018: Pišam po sirotinji
- 2018: Dogodine u Prizrenu
- 2018: Neuništivi/Mozak
- 2019: Druže
- 2020: Sviće Zora
- 2020: Izvini Srbijo
- 2021: Danima
- 2021: Dan Po Dan
- 2021: I Dalje Kidam
- 2022: Jedina Srpska
- 2022: Moja Sudbina
- 2022: Ljubav u inat
- 2022: Među Zvezdama
- 2022: Naša stvar
- 2023: Čekam sreću
- 2023: Sparta
- 2024: Anđeli Žive Doveka
- 2024: Samo Vas Gledamo
- 2024: Kradi
- 2024: Marš iz moje avlije
- 2025: Mojne da si ćaci
- 2026: Strane diplomate

== Awards and nominations ==
| Year | Award | Category | Result |
|---|---|---|---|
| 2010 | Serbian Oscar Of Popularity | E-Oscar | Nominated |
