= Wikluh Sky =

Serbian rapper and singer

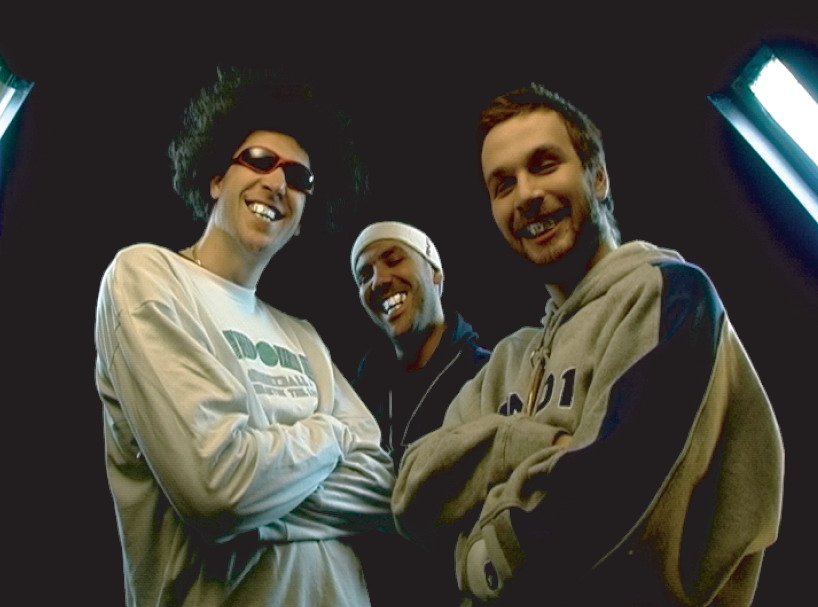
- Wikluh Sky (right) with other Bad Copy members in 2005.

Background information
- Born: Đorđe Miljenović; 10 December 1980 (age 45); Belgrade, SR Serbia, Yugoslavia
- Origin: Belgrade, Serbia
- Genres: Hip hop; ragga; rock; dubstep
- Occupations: Musician; rapper; singer; DJ; producer
- Years active: 1996 – present

Đorđe Miljenović (Serbian Cyrillic: Ђорђе Миљеновић; born 10 December 1980) better known by his stage name Wikluh Sky (Serbian: Виклер Скаj, Vikler Skaj) is a Serbian musician, rapper, singer, DJ, and producer.

Best known for being a member of Bad Copy hip-hop trio, he is also a part of Marčelo's accompanying Filter Crew, and raggamuffin group/project Shappa. In addition to participating in all of the above groups and projects, Wikluh Sky maintains a solo career as well.

== Biography ==
He graduated from musical high school, additionally completed two years of Belgrade Music Academy before dropping out. After taking part in various hip-hop related endeavours, he lately started branching out into different kinds of music exemplified in Frank Zappaesque rock-opera called Zagađenje u Japanu ("Pollution in Japan"), which was his first release under his birth name. He played most of the instruments on that album.

His second solo album Ortaci ne znaju ("Homies Don't Know") was released in November 2007.

He wrote and produced several tracks on Ana Stanić's album Sudar that came out in March 2008. Also in early 2008 Wikluh Sky recorded a song called "Lova" with Šaban Bajramović for the TV series Vratiće se rode.

In March 2008, he appeared as contestant on Veliki brat VIP, which further raised his public profile. In late 2008, he again appeared in another TV production of Emotion company - Operacija trijumf.

In 2009, he produced the S.A.R.S.' debut album. He also wrote the music and lyrics of the song "Pazi šta radiš" that was performed by Tijana Bogićević at Beovizija 2009.

He is the composer for the 2010 movie A Serbian Film.

In 2013, he was one of the contestants in the first season of the Serbian version of Your Face Sounds Familiar. He placed 8th in the finals.

Until late 2016 was composer for then still developed video game "Scorn", also composed the main theme for the game's 2016 official teaser trailer.

== Discography ==
Date of Release	Title	Label
2003	Bad Copy - Sve sami hedovi	One Records
2004	Zašto brate Vikler	One Records
2005	Shappa	Ammonite Records
2006	Zagađenje u Japanu	Multimedia/Universal
2006	Bad Copy - Najgori do sada	Prohibicija
2007	Ortaci ne znaju	Multimedia/Universal
2013	Do kraja sveta, vol. 1 (with DJ Rahmanee)	MTV Download
2013	Krigle (with Bad Copy)	Mascom
2017	Amovi (Solo album)	Mascom

== Awards and nominations ==
Year	Award	Category	Result
2009	Serbian Oscar Of Popularity	E-Oscar	Won
2013	Serbian Oscar Of Popularity	Best Hip-hop single	Won
2014	Serbian Oscar Of Popularity	Best Hip-hop album	Won
2015	Serbian Oscar Of Popularity	Best Hip-hop album	Won
