= Fajront Republika =

- Starring: Zoran Kesić; Igor Bugarski; Aleksandar Todorović Bekan
- Country of origin: Serbia
- No. of seasons: 3

Production
- Running time: ~50 minutes

Original release
- Network: 1Prva
- Release: December 21, 2008 – June 26, 2011

Fajront Republika (Serbian: Фајронт република) was a Serbian talk show / sketch show that aired weekly on 1Prva (formerly known as Fox televizija) from December 2008 until June 2011.

Hosted by Zoran Kesić, the programme blended classic talk show elements such as show-business guests promoting their activity and musical performances with sketch comedy that included characters developed and played by Kesić. Its guests were drawn from the public sphere in Serbia and the rest of the Balkans. The show's name translates to "Closing time Republic" and it premiered on Sunday, 21 December 2008 at 11pm. It has since then been moved (in late January 2009) to Thursdays at 9pm, and then back to Sundays at 11pm in early November 2009.

Starting in fall 2012, a year after getting cancelled, a live version of the show, this time named Fajront Republika 3D, had been performed with bi-weekly frequency at a Belgrade theater.

== History ==
After the quickly canceled Marko Živić Show and Oralno doba, Fajront Republika was Fox televizija's third attempt in less than 2 years to come up with a long term locally produced entertainment talk-show programme. Unlike its previous two tries that aired nightly, Fajront Republika was broadcast weekly, probably due to specific editing requirements. Shot on a set that resembles a kafana with a bar and a stage, the programme was also geared towards a younger audience much more so than a fore mentioned shows.

The host, Zoran Kesić, was somewhat already known due to his earlier television shows Dezinformator and Klub zatvorenog tipa that aired locally in Belgrade on local station TV Metropolis, while Fajront Republika became his first shot on the national Serbia-wide television. In addition to Kesić, some of the hosting duties were handled by sidekicks Igor Bugarski and Aleksandar Todorović Bekan. Another important member of the team was Balša Bošković who handled the editing.

Fajront Republika quickly managed to build an audience due to the host's irreverent style and jovial personality. Additionally, it gained a sizable following on Facebook as well as through Kesić's side promotional activities such as making a literal music video from Madonna's "Like a Prayer" and posting it on YouTube in November 2009 — the video quickly went viral, reaching 1 million views in less than a month before being taken down due to copyright infringement issues.

Towards the end of the second season in May 2010, the show created a bit of a stir in Serbian media by announcing that it is going off the air, and airing the farewell episode. This was followed by the network's official announcement that it's just changing hosts and original host's outraged reaction at this turn of events. For a single episode the show was in fact hosted by Žarko Stepanov. Eventually, it was revealed the whole thing was a media stunt created by Kesić and he returned as host for the following episode.

Fajront Republika's ratings reportedly deteriorated during the third season after the May 2010 launch and quick success of Veče sa Ivanom Ivanovićem, another entertainment weekly talk show on Prva's schedule. In July and August 2011 as Fajront Republika wrapped up its third season, rumors appeared in Serbian print media that the show will not be back in September for the fourth season. The rumours were substantiated when the show was not announced at Prva's fall schedule presentation on 31 August 2011.

In fall 2012, Fajront Republika was partially revived in the form of a bi-weekly event called Fajront Republika 3D held in Kolosej movie theater in Belgrade. The first show was performed on 13 September 2012. In its live theatrical form, the show took on a more variety format. By November it started featuring prominent guests such as Anica Dobra and stand-up comic Neša Bridžis.

== Guests ==
The show usually had a single main guest (or group) throughout its run:

=== Season 1 ===
- Ana Stanić (December 21, 2008)
- Ajs Nigrutin and Wikluh Sky (December 28, 2008)
- So Sabi, Zemlja Gruva and Drum'n'Zez (January 4, 2009)
- Uroš Đurić and Dejan Rambo Petković (January 11, 2009)
- Ivana Jordan (January 18, 2009)
- Raša Popov (January 22, 2009)
- Sergej Trifunović and Dragana Ćosić (January 29, 2009)
- Ivan Zeljković, Ivan Ivanović, Zbogom Brus Li, and Nives Celzijus (February 5, 2009)
- Survivor Srbija: Panama contestants (February 12, 2009)
- Borka Tomović and Nenad Maričić (February 19, 2009)
- Marčelo (February 26, 2009)
- Dragan Ilić (March 5, 2009)
- Srđan Miletić (March 12, 2009)
- Goca Tržan (March 19, 2009)
- Beogradski sindikat (Škabo, Đolođolo, Feđa a.k.a. MC Flex, and Ogi) (March 26, 2009)
- Milan "Tarot" Radonjić (April 2, 2009)
- Cast of Beogradski fantom (Marko Živić, Nada Macanković and director Jovan Todorović) and Sajsi MC (April 9, 2009)
- Nina Badrić (April 16, 2009)
- Dragan Ristić (of the band Kal) (April 23, 2009)
- Neda Arnerić (April 30, 2009)
- Aleksandra Kovač (May 7, 2009)
- Martina Vrbos (May 14, 2009)
- Vuk Bojović (May 21, 2009)
- Dragoljub S. Ljubičić Mićko (May 28, 2009)
- Van Gogh (June 4, 2009)
- Let 3 (June 11, 2009)
- Rob Stewart and Atheist Rap (June 18, 2009)
- Duška Jovanić and Aleksandar Đurišić (June 25, 2009)
- Mita (July 2, 2009)

=== Season 2 ===
- from Rose village on Luštica: Zoran Živković, Nebojša "Šobaja" Anđelković (September 10, 2009)
- Cast of Tamo i ovde (Bane Trifunović, Feđa Stojanović, and director Darko Lungulov) (September 17, 2009)
- Aleksa Gajić (September 24, 2009)
- Kraljevi Ade (Tatjana Vesnić, Aleksandra Obradović, Miljan, and Ivan) (October 1, 2009)
- Ivan Tasovac and Gorčin Stojanović (October 8, 2009)
- cast of Čekaj me, ja sigurno neću doći (Miloš Samolov and Gordan Kičić) (October 15, 2009)
- Kiki Lesendrić (October 22, 2009)
- Andrija Milošević (October 29, 2009)
- Nebojsa Grnčarski, Marijana Mateus, Zvonko Marković (November 8, 2009)
- Negative (November 22, 2009)
- The Books of Knjige part 1 (November 29, 2009)
- The Books of Knjige part 2 (December 6, 2009)
- cast of Popaj i sakriveno blago theatre play (December 13, 2009)
- Ljubomir Bandović (December 20, 2009)
- Ljubivoje Ršumović (December 27, 2009)
- New Year's Special with Borka Tomović, Aleksandra Kovač, Dragoljub S. Ljubičić Mićko, Sergej Trifunović (December 31, 2009)
- Marko Vidojković (January 10, 2010)
- Rambo Petković and Darko Bajić (January 17, 2010)
- Tony Cetinski and Ognjen Radivojević (January 24, 2010)
- Bobo Knežević, Marija Savić-Srećković, and Petar Čelik (January 31, 2010)
- Igor Brakus and Aleksandar Todorović Bekan (February 7, 2010)
- Katarina Radivojević (February 14, 2010)
- Jelena Janković (February 21, 2010)
- Dragan Mićanović (February 28, 2010)
- Vlada Divljan (March 7, 2010)
- Voja Nedeljković and Repetitor (March 14, 2010)
- Survivor Srbija: Philippines contestants and Stuttgart Online (March 21, 2010)
- Maja Nikolić and Purašević (March 28, 2010)
- Jova Radovanović (April 4, 2010)
- Prljavi Inspektor Blaža and Desimir Stojković (April 11, 2010)
- Saša Lošić (April 18, 2010)
- Dragana Grnčarski, Vuk Rosandić and Suzana Perić (April 25, 2010)
- Dejan Cukić (May 2, 2010)
- Fake last episode (May 9, 2010)
- Fake "new show Fajront Republika"; Marija Kilibarda (May 16, 2010)
- "Return of the Jedi"; Marija Kilibarda and Žarko Stepanov (May 23, 2010)
- Mirjana Karanović (May 30, 2010)
- Aleksandar Stojanović and So Sabi (June 6, 2010)
- Miloš Vlalukin and Marko Klovn (June 13, 2010)
- Vrelo (June 20, 2010)
- Kids (June 27, 2010)

=== Season 3 ===
- Nađa Higl (October 3, 2010)
- FK Partizan players (Milan Smiljanić, Radosav Petrović and Cléo) (October 10, 2010)
- Aleksandar Srećković as Che Guevara (October 17, 2010)
- Anica Dobra (October 24, 2010)
- Stevan Filipović, Marčelo and Miki Panjković (October 31, 2010)
- "Fashion Fajront" (Tamara Bakić, Neven Bošković, Ana Mirković and Nevena Gičević) (November 7, 2010)
- "The Twilight Zone" (Nikola Zavišić, Anastasija Mandić and Voja Antonić) (November 14, 2010)
- "Stand-up comedy", part 1 (Srđan Jovanović and Milica Mihajlović) (November 21, 2010)
- "Stand-up comedy", part 2 (Srđan Jovanović, Aleksandar Perišić and Nikola "Džoni Fazoni") (November 28, 2010)
- Rambo Amadeus, part 1 (December 5, 2010)
- Rambo Amadeus and Goran Ljuboja, part 2 (December 12, 2010)
- Tijana Dapčević (December 19, 2010)
- "Disco party" (Boban Petrović, Zemlja Gruva and Šobaja) (December 26, 2010)
- New Year's Special, part 1 (Branka Nevistić, Dejan Petrović, Mašan Lekić, Jasna Jovanović and Srđan Karanović) (January 2, 2011)
- New Year's Special, part 2 (Nina Radulović, Danijela Jankov, Ivan Zeljković, Ivan Tešanović and Miljan Milićević) (January 9, 2011)
- Cast of Montevideo, God Bless You! (Miloš Biković, Petar Strugar and Nikola Đuričko) (January 16, 2011)
- Branislav Lečić (January 23, 2011)
- Saša Plećević - "Dr. Feelgood" (January 30, 2011)
- Del Arno Band (February 6, 2011)
- Đorđe David & Death Saw Band (February 13, 2011)
- Neno Belan (February 20, 2011)
- Mima Karadžić and Marijo Kržić (February 27, 2011)
- Gorica Popović, Tanja Bošković and Radomir Nikolić (March 6, 2011)
- Orthodox Celts (March 13, 2011)
- Milutin "Mita" Jovančić, Rambo Amadeus and Magnifico (March 20, 2011)
- Cast of Neprijatelj (Vuk Kostić and director Dejan Zečević) (March 27, 2011)
- Slobodan Nikitović, Sonja Živanović, Darko Dožić and Nenad Maričić (April 3, 2011)
- Milan "Caci" Mihailović (April 10, 2011)
- Jovana Medić, Goca Đokić and Bojan Božić (April 17, 2011)
- Goran Kovačević (MC Zmija), Marko Milićević (MC Gramophonedzie) and Marko Milošević (MC MKDSL) (April 24, 2011)
- Darko Mitrović and Marko Stepanović (May 1, 2011)
- Vladimir Aleksić, Nataša Marković and Anđelika Simić (May 8, 2011)
- Ivan Milivojev, Miloš Ignjatović and Venti Vadada (May 15, 2011)
- Vojislav Voja Žanetić (May 22, 2011)
- Srpski Top Model - Host: Ivana Stanković; Finalists: Milica Đorđević, Neda Stojanović and Bojana Banjac (May 29, 2011)
- Vozdignuće - Fajront Republika's movie (June 5, 2011)
- Zoran Filipović (June 12, 2011)
- Goran Biševac and Miroslav Majkić (June 19, 2011)
- Special - Last episode of third season (June 26, 2011)
