= SARS (band) =

Serbian alternative rock band

S.A.R.S. С.А.Р.С.
- Also known as: Sveže Amputirana Ruka Satrijanija
- Origin: Belgrade (Serbia)
- Genres: Alternative rock, pop rock, reggae, blues, jazz, ethnic music, hip hop
- Years active: 2006 – present
- Labels: Prunam&Faber
- Members: Aleksandar Luković; Boris Tasev; Milan Jejina; Nenad Đorđević; Nebojša Pavlović; Nevena Filipović; Žarko Kovačević
- Past members: Sanja Lalić; Tihomir Hinić; Petar Milanović; Vladimir Popović; Ivana Blažević; Goran Mladenović; Branislav Lučić; Dragan Kovačević; Miloš Bakalović; Miloš Kovačević
- Website: http://sarsbend.com/

Sveže Amputirana Ruka Satrijanija (Serbian Cyrillic: Свеже ампутирана рука Сатријанија, lit. 'The Freshly Amputated Arm of Satriani'), or S.A.R.S. for short, are a Serbian alternative rock band from Belgrade. Presenting a combination of pop rock, reggae, blues, jazz and hip hop with the ethnic music of Serbia, the band is one of the leading acts of the so-called New Serbian Scene.

== History ==
The band was formed in March 2006 by Aleksandar Luković "Lukac" (guitar) and Dragan Kovačević "Žabac" (vocals) along with Vladimir Popović "Hobbo" (vocals), Žarko Kovačević "Žare" (vocals), Miloš Kovačević "Kriva" (bass guitar), Branislav Lučić "Beban" (percussion), Goran Mladenović "Japanac" (drums) and Ivana Blažević "Violina" (violin). All musicians came from a different music backgrounds and spheres of interest, resulting in unique fusion sound of divergent music genres. At first they “jammed” in garage owned by Aleksander Luković best friend Ivona Vovković.

=== Break up and huge success ===
After a few minor live appearances in 2007, including several performances at Belgrade clubs as well as the Niš performance as a part of the Mirovni Karavan (Peace Caravan) manifestation, the band had entered a crisis. At the time the band recorded the demo for the song "Buđav lebac" ("Moldy Bread") at the Resnik RLZ, home made studio.

In early 2008, bassist Miloš Kovačević went to serve in the army, drummer Mladenović and violinist Blažević had left the band, thus the band disbanded. After the break up, band's friend Siniša "Kum" decided to promote the song "Buđav lebac" by using internet guerrilla marketing. He created a simple video for the song and uploaded the demo to YouTube. Without any mainstream media promotion, "Buđav lebac" made by the anonymous band S.A.R.S. had become a top chart hit in Serbia and all other former Yugoslav republics.

=== "Buđav lebac" meme phenomenon ===
"Buđav lebac" multi-layer meanings and catchy theme got it accepted by the broad audience. The song describes social contrasts and the poor economic situation of an ordinary man by using word play and dark humor. Along with a catchy melody and innovative vocal performance, "Buđav lebac" became one of the most popular alternative tracks in ex-Yugoslav countries. "Buđav lebac" created a huge public and social buzz without any mainstream media promotion. After initial guerrilla release, song share rate and success was compared with pandemics growth, corresponding with band's name S.A.R.S. "Buđav lebac" became offline and online meme

The Serbian swimmer Nađa Higl stated that she had sung the song lyrics before the race in Rome where she became the World Champion in 200 m breaststroke, and the audience had sung the song to her at the Belgrade City Council plateau at the welcome ceremony. At the other welcome ceremony in her home town Pančevo, Higl appeared on stage with S.A.R.S. who had been performing at the ceremony. The song, with altered lyrics, was also sung by Delije, the fans of the football club Red Star Belgrade, due to the economic situation within the club.

=== The first album - S.A.R.S. ===
"Buđav lebac" huge public success had encouraged the rest of the band to continue working. In mid-2008, bassist Miloš Kovačević returned from the army and the band once again entered the RLZ studio and recorded several demos including the song "Ratujemo ti i ja" ("We are at War, You and Me"), with the new members Miloš Bakalović "Bakal" (drums) and Boris Tasev "Bora" (keyboards, accordion). During late 2008, the band got an offer from the PGP-RTS record label to record their debut album.

The album recording sessions, done with the help of the producer Đorđe Miljenović Wikluh Sky, were finished within a couple of months, and the eponymous debut album S.A.R.S was officially released in March 2009. The song lyrics for the album had been written by the vocalists Kovačević and Popović, and the music and arrangements were done by Kovačević, Luković and Miljenović and guest appearances featured former Eyesburn frontman Nemanja Kojić (trombone on "Ratujemo ti i ja" and "Zubarka" ("The Dentist"), the multi-instrumentalist Aleksandar Sedlar Bogoev (bouzouki on the same tracks), Nikola Demonja (saxophone), Kanda, Kodža i Nebojša member Vladan Rajović (drums on "Zubarka") and the former band member Ivana Blažević "Violina" (violin on the track "Sindrom lidera male stranke" ("Syndrome Of A Minor Political Party Leader ")).

Simultaneously with album release appeared the official video for the song "Buđav lebac". It was an animated video directed by the Serbian illustrator Aleksa Gajić. In the meantime, in early 2009, the band got the award on TV Metropolis for the greatest musical discovery in 2008.

=== Member departures and controversy ===
In mid-2009 after the first's album huge success, the original lineup suddenly changed. The transition from an unknown alternative underground band to an MTV featured pop band meant an earthquake. Original S.A.R.S. repertoire included hard rock, punk and heavy metal songs, not welcomed by the broader audience. Original singers Dragan Kovačević and Vladimir Popović promoted anarchism and fight against authorities during live plays. S.A.R.S. frequently performed poorly on stage because of the musicians' lack of discipline. All that will change over the night when the band became commercial.

Vocalist Dragan Kovačević became the band manager and band owner, his brother Žarko Kovačević became the lead singer. Dragan Kovačević carried out band rebuild expelling original lineup members and introducing new musicians to the band. Vocalist Popović, bassist Kovačević, percussionist Lučić, and drummer Bakalović left the band. Ex S.A.R.S. members together with ex S.A.R.S. violinist Blažević, formed a new band, VHS (an acronym for Very Heavy S.A.R.S.). VHS continued to play harder sound performing in underground clubs. New S.A.R.S will change direction towards pop music in its future albums.

New members arrived, Nenad Đorđević "Đole" (bass guitar), Tihomir Hinić "Tihi" (drums), Petar Milanović "Pera" (trombone, saxophone) and Sanja Lalić (backing vocals). New members appeared in the second SARS video, for the song "Debeli lad" ("Thick Shade"). On November of the same year, the band recorded the video for the song "Rakija" ("Brandy"). The later song, along with "Buđav lebac", was performed by the band in the Fajront Republika hosted by Zoran Kesić.

=== Tour and the second album ===
In October 2009, the band went on their first tour, performing at various Serbian, Croatian and Bosnian cities and towns, ended with a large concert at the Belgrade Youth Center. After the tour, the band entered the studio in order to record the material for the upcoming album. In the meantime, in March 2010, the band had a well-acclaimed performance at MTV. Also, the band had recorded the soundtrack for the TV series Može i drugačije (It May Be Different), debuted in January 2010. At midnight on 31 December 2010 the band released their second studio album, Perspektiva (Perspective), released for free digital download at the MTV Adria official website. In 2011, "Buđav lebac" was polled, by the listeners of Radio 202, one of 60 greatest songs released by PGP-RTB/PGP-RTS. On 27 June 2012, S.A.R.S., alongside Public Enemy, Example, Jessie J, Dubioza Kolektiv and Orbital, performed on the first evening of the first Belgrade Calling festival.

=== 3rd Album - Kuća časti ===
In March 2013, the band released their third studio album, Kuća časti (On the House). The album, announced by the singles "Mir u svetu" ("World Peace"), "Mitohondrija" ("Mitochondrion"), was released for free download via band's official site. The album featured numerous guest appearances, including the appearance of Montenegrin hip hop duo Who See. In May, S.A.R.S. appeared on the tribute album to the band Brkovi entitled Brkati gosti (Guests with Mustaches) with a cover of Brkovi song "Naša mala zemlja" ("Our Little Country"). By the end of May 2013, the album Kuća časti overreached the number of 45.000 downloads.

=== 4th Album - Ikone pop kulture ===
In January 2014, the band released the album Ikone pop kulture (Pop Culture Icons). The album is available for free download from the band's official website. At the same time, the band, together with the duo Dont, recorded and released as a single an English language version of "Buđav lebac", entitled "Moldy Bread".

== Discography ==
=== Studio albums ===
- S.A.R.S. (2009)
- Perspektiva (2011)
- Kuća časti (2013)
- Ikone pop kulture (2014)
- Proleće (2015)
- Poslednji album (2016)
- Glava (2019)

=== Live albums ===
- Mir i ljubav (2015)

=== Singles ===
- Živim na Balkanu (2017)
- Ljubav umire (2018)
- Teško je (2018)

=== Compilations ===
- 10 (2016)

=== Other appearances ===
- "Naša mala zemlja" (Brkati gosti, 2013)
