= List of The District episodes =

This is a list of all episodes of the television police drama series The District.

== Series overview ==
Season	Episodes	Originally released	
Season	Episodes	First released	Last released
1	23	October 7, 2000	May 19, 2001
2	22	September 29, 2001	May 18, 2002
3	22	September 28, 2002	May 17, 2003
4	22	September 27, 2003	May 1, 2004

== Episodes ==
=== Season 1 (2000–01) ===
No. overall	No. in season	Title	Directed by	Written by	Original release date	U.S. viewers (millions)
1	1	"Pilot"	Terry George	Terry George	October 6, 2000	14.55
Jack Mannion becomes the new chief of police in Washington, D.C., but he's met with hostility by Joe Noland, who feels more deserving of the promotion.
2	2	"Dirty Laundry"	Terry George	Terry George	October 13, 2000	13.69
Mannion is pressured by a congressman's chief of staff to solve the murder of a rich college kid in Georgetown.
3	3	"Worst Block"	Richard Compton	Hans Beimler	October 20, 2000	12.15
Mannion attempts to clean up the most crime-infested block in D.C., while Temple is accused of pushing a drug dealer in front of a car and a woman claims to be Ricky's aunt, to Ella's shock.
4	4	"Surveillance"	Sarah Pia Anderson	Meredith Stiehm	October 27, 2000	13.49
Mannion angers veteran officers when he shifts their day shifts to evening in order to reduce crime. In the meantime, McGregor thinks the chief is investigating him and Ella is challenged for custody of Ricky.
5	5	"The Real Terrorist"	Michael Watkins	Michael Daly	November 3, 2000	13.68
The police are ordered by the FBI to participate in a rehearsal for a possible terrorist attack. In other events, a teen goes on a killing spree after escaping a detention facility, Ella fears losing Ricky in a custody hearing and Nick goes on a date with Helen.
6	6	"How They Lived"	Oz Scott	Pam Veasey	November 10, 2000	12.27
Mannion disciplines several officers caught stealing on the job who are needed for riot control when Fidel Castro visits D.C. along with a Cuban general who killed exiles in a bombing. Meanwhile, Ella's custody case comes to an end.
7	7	"Imperfect Victims"	Richard Lewis	Terry George & Lynn Marie Latham	November 17, 2000	13.92
Ella worries what will happen to Ricky when he testifies against his father in court for murdering the boy's mother. In the meantime, Temple attempts to convince a rape victim to testify against the rapist and Nick discovers evidence against the mayor.
8	8	"The Jackal"	Sandy Smolan	Terry George & Aaron Iverson	November 24, 2000	14.66
A criminal is stalking elderly people, emptying their bank accounts and murdering them. In other events, the mayor comes clean about his past and Ella isn't sure whether to accept a date offer.
9	9	"Pot Scrubbers"	Stephen Cragg	Pam Veasey	December 8, 2000	12.86
Mannion attempts to arrest a dealer giving drugs to rich executives, while his ex-wife Sherry arrives with bad news.
10	10	"The Santa Wars"	Sandy Smolan	Story by : Terry George & Hans Beimler; Teleplay by : Linda Gase & Sadhbh Walshe & Scott Williams	December 15, 2000	13.36
Two groups of Santas fight over the best corners for charity. In the meantime, Mannion is threatened by an anonymous phone caller claiming to have been mistreated in the past, a truck of Christmas merchandise is stolen and a high-ranking senator is arrested for drinking and driving.
11	11	"The D.C. Strangler"	Kevin Dowling	Hans Beimler & Jack Maple	January 5, 2001	12.99
Temple isn't sure he can lead an investigation to catch a serial killer strangling prostitutes after seeing the victims' bodies. Meanwhile, Mannion is pressured to hire a politically-correct candidate as district commander.
12	12	"Old Ghosts"	Oz Scott	Terry George & Sadhbh Walshe	January 19, 2001	13.59
Mannion gets personally involved in a case when a woman asks him to find her husband. In the meantime, McGregor threatens an ex-IRA gunman who's in D.C. for peace talks.
13	13	"Vigilante"	Peter Markle	Scott Williams	February 2, 2001	13.63
Mannion looks for a vigilante killing men convicted of child molestation, while Ella discovers that a neighbor is a former sex offender.
14	14	"Rage Against the Machine"	Damon Santostefano	Linda Gase	February 9, 2001	13.46
Mannion tries to reunite a boy with his imprisoned mother. In other events, McGregor attempts to protect a woman from her stalker, a female reporter follows Mannion to write his profile and Temple has doubts about his forthcoming wedding.
15	15	"The Most Dangerous Job"	Rod Holcomb	Aaron Iverson	February 16, 2001	14.33
Mannion promises to give cabbies better protection when a cab driver shoots a passenger he thought tried to rob him. Meanwhile, a new U.S. Attorney proves to be controversial and McGregor is jealous of Nancy getting flowers from a secret admirer.
16	16	"A Southern Town"	Rick Rosenthal	Pam Veasey	February 23, 2001	13.77
Mannion heads to New York to attend -- and hopefully stop -- his ex-wife's wedding, while a former cop accuses Noland of covering up a 30-year-old case involving a politician's son.
17	17	"New World"	Jerry Levine	Sadhbh Walshe	March 30, 2001	13.11
A Vietnamese businessman and former colonel is suspected of running a sex-slave operation using kidnapped Asian girls, one of whom is found dead. In other events, Ricky won't tell Ella why he doesn't want to go to school and a confrontation ensues when McGregor is reluctant to acknowledge his relationship with Nancy.
18	18	"Night Moves"	Kevin Dowling	Pam Veasey	April 6, 2001	11.49
Mannion attempts to take down the leader of a vicious gang who shot a rival and make a suspected arsonist confess to setting a fire in a nearby park. Meanwhile, Nick is robbed and assaulted in his home and 911 operators threaten to quit unless their demands are met.
19	19	"The Agony and the Ecstasy"	Oz Scott	Linda Gase	April 20, 2001	13.78
Mannion discovers that his girlfriend is supplying his son with an illegal drug, while Nancy is forced to admit that she had a one-night stand with a stranger after her gun is stolen.
20	20	"Running Towards Fire"	Terry George	Terry George	April 27, 2001	13.24
An off-duty white cop shoots an undercover black cop in the back during a stakeout.
21	21	"Don't Fence Me In"	Sandy Smolan	Story by : Jim Chory; Teleplay by : Michael Daly & Jack Maple	May 4, 2001	12.70
While undercover in a fencing operation, Temple attempts to catch criminals on tape bringing in stolen property. In other events, Mannion helps a psychic find the President's runaway dog and Nick gets in trouble for using Mannion's name to keep an old firehouse from being torn down.
22	22	"Fools Russian: Part 1"	Rick Rosenthal	Scott Williams	May 11, 2001	11.08
The FBI investigates Mannion after he makes contact with an old informant from the Russian mafia about a bank robbery where two ex-cops were killed. Meanwhile, Temple's fiancee is shot during an attack in the hospital and Ella discovers her cancer has returned.
23	23	"Fools Russian: Part 2"	Rick Rosenthal	Hans Beimler	May 18, 2001	12.95
The mayor suspends Mannion as the FBI continues to investigate the chief's ties to Russian mafia. In the meantime, Temple comes back to work too early after his fiancee's murder -- endangering himself and several other officers -- and Ella goes through a mastectomy. Eventually, McGregor was killed.

=== Season 2 (2001–02) ===
No. overall	No. in season	Title	Directed by	Written by	Original release date	U.S. viewers (millions)
24	1	"Lost and Found"	Jim Charleston	Pam Veasey	September 28, 2001	11.80
Mannion is pressured to find a congressman's missing aide. In other events, Temple is partnered with Kevin Debreno and Ella comes back to work following her chemotherapy.
25	2	"Foreign Affair"	David Jackson	Reed Steiner	October 5, 2001	11.91
Temple and Debreno look for the source of a new heroin that's hitting the streets, while Mannion's son has his sentencing hearing.
26	3	"Night Shift (a.k.a. Backfire)"	Julian Chojnacki	John Wirth	October 12, 2001	12.36
Nancy returns to patrol and investigates the shooting death of a man who's allegedly the victim of a carjacking ring. In the meantime, a poisonous snake is loose in police headquarters.
27	4	"The Project"	Deran Sarafian	Linda Gase	October 19, 2001	12.15
Mannion moves to a violent housing project to investigate a woman's murder in the courtyard. In other events, Noland confronts a friend about his odd behavior on the force, and Debreno attempts to talk Temple into taking the fall for a car accident Debreno caused.
28	5	"To Serve and Protect"	Oz Scott	Reed Steiner & Andrew Dettmann	October 26, 2001	11.86
Noland returns to a missing persons case he investigated eight years ago when the body of a five-year-old boy is found. Meanwhile, Nancy gets involved in a domestic-abuse case, Ella is unable to fire an employee for budgetary reasons and Nick tries to talk Mannion into running for mayor.
29	6	"Meltdown"	Kevin Dowling	Pam Veasey & Jonathan Lisco	November 9, 2001	11.34
A 7-year-old boy shoots two of his fellow students with a gun that was confiscated in a buy-back program. Meanwhile, Temple thinks a friend might be on drugs again and a woman puts a curse on Mannion for arresting her husband.
30	7	"Bulldog's Ghost"	Rick Rosenthal	John Wirth & Michael Ostrowski	November 16, 2001	13.71
Mannion discovers a possible conspiracy as he investigates the murder of a homeless Vietnam vet who had been reported missing in action.
31	8	"Tug of War"	Robert Mandel	Reed Steiner & Jason Wilborn	November 23, 2001	13.36
Mannion goes after a ring of thieves who steal expensive purses and sell them on the black market after a woman is killed in one of their attacks. The chief must also deal with an ex-girlfriend who claims partial ownership of his boat.
32	9	"Cop Hunt"	Deran Sarafian	Pam Veasey	November 30, 2001	13.39
A woman claims to have been raped by a police officer who pulled her over for a traffic violation. While searching for the bad cop, Mannion is visited by his daughter, who has news about her future.
33	10	"Thursday"	Jim Charleston	John Wirth & Linda Gase	January 11, 2002	12.26
When a cop drowns saving people from a submerged car, his fellow officers remember their last day with him.
34	11	"Russian Winter (a.k.a. The Russian Wars)"	Sandy Smolan	Andrew Dettmann	January 18, 2002	10.12
A Russian woman claims that Mannion's nemesis, Dimitri Putin, is trying to kill her and that Putin ordered her husband to murder McGregor. She also claims there's a hidden recording of Putin giving the order to kill the chief, so Mannion races to find the evidence, only to come face-to-face with his enemy.
35	12	"Twist of Hate"	Rick Rosenthal	Jonathan Lisco	January 25, 2002	9.34
Mannion searches for the culprits who committed hate crimes at a mosque and Ella's apartment.
36	13	"This Too Shall Pass"	Jim Charleston	Alan Ormsby	February 1, 2002	12.30
A local reporter's body is found in an abandoned building and the evidence suggests that a paraplegic is the murderer. Meanwhile, Mannion's daughter graduates from the police academy.
37	14	"Wasteland"	Jerry Levine	Reed Steiner & Jason Wilborn	February 8, 2002	10.66
A former teacher takes members of the Board of Education hostage and demands an investigation to determine if a local school is being contaminated by toxic waste.
38	15	"Daughter for Daughter"	David Jackson	Greggory Nations	February 15, 2002	10.45
Mannion's daughter is kidnapped by Dimitri Putin, who allegedly wants to trade her for his own daughter in a witness protection program.
39	16	"The Greenhouse Effect"	Jim Charleston	Michael Ostrowski	March 15, 2002	8.81
A Congressman is killed in the alley behind Teddy R's restaurant and Mannion suspects she knows more than she's telling him. Meanwhile, Nancy is jealous when Brander's old female partner arrives.
40	17	"Still Life"	Pam Veasey	John Wirth & Pam Veasey	March 22, 2002	9.30
Mannion investigates the theft of a $2 million Picasso painting from a local museum. In other events, Clive tells Ella a secret when she suspects her cancer is back and Nancy learns her mother is getting divorced.
41	18	"Shades of Gray"	Jim Chory	Jason Wilborn	April 19, 2002	9.89
Mannion is pressured to reinstate a politically-connected police commander he just demoted for his poor job performance, while Nancy is faced with possible discipline for injuring a suspect with her nightstick.
42	19	"Shell Game"	Helen Shaver	Reed Steiner & Andrew Dettmann	April 26, 2002	10.02
Mannion asks Agency director Tom Gage (Beau Bridges) for information about the murder of a CIA agent who was working undercover, then questions Lisa Fabrizzi (Gloria Reuben), who was the last person to see the victim alive. This episode begins a crossover with The Agency that concludes on "Doublecrossover".
43	20	"The Killing Point"	Christopher Taylor	John Wirth & Pam Veasey	May 3, 2002	9.98
Mannion tries to stop the execution of a man falsely accused of murder when a priest receives an anonymous letter revealing the whereabouts of the murder weapon. In the meantime, Ella struggles with whether to let Ricky visit his father in prison.
44	21	"Convictions"	Craig T. Nelson	Gar Anthony Haywood	May 10, 2002	10.01
Debreno's past is used against him by a defense attorney bent on discrediting him in a case involving a diplomat's son arrested for dealing drugs.
45	22	"Payback"	Jim Charleston	John Wirth & Linda Gase	May 17, 2002	8.87
Mannion attempts to stop a gang war and ensure the release of two officers held captive by one of the gangs. In other events, Temple suffers the effects of smoking crack while undercover as a drug dealer and Ella receives a marriage proposal.

=== Season 3 (2002–03) ===
No. overall	No. in season	Title	Directed by	Written by	Original release date	U.S. viewers (millions)
46	1	"Resurrection"	Oz Scott	John Wirth	September 27, 2002	10.30
An aggressive U.S. attorney general pressures Noland to solve Mannion's disappearance after the chief is shot on his boat and falls overboard into the Potomac River. Little does everyone realize is that Mannion is in hiding to find out who's behind the shooting.
47	2	"Oil and Water"	Jim Charleston	Jonathan Lisco	October 4, 2002	11.12
Still presumed dead, Mannion heads to Paris to follow the Government official he suspects is responsible for the attempt on his life. Meanwhile, back in D.C., Temple is pulled over for speeding and an officer finds cocaine in his car, but Temple swears the drugs are evidence he collected at a crime scene and forgot to turn in.
48	3	"Explicit Activities"	Sharron Miller	Pam Veasey	October 11, 2002	12.21
Mannion attempts to toughen legislation against Internet child pornography when an 11-year-old girl, whose photo was on a porn site, is found dead. He also butts heads with a civil-rights attorney on a case where a cop is charged with using excessive force.
49	4	"Drug Money"	Christopher Taylor	Jason Wilborn	October 18, 2002	11.38
Mannion investigates a series of robberies where pharmaceuticals, most of them for AIDS, are stolen. In other events, Temple worries about taking a random drug test since he failed to report using cocaine while undercover and Debreno is won by a mayoral candidate in a charity bachelor auction.
50	5	"Faith"	Jim Chory	Patricia Green	October 25, 2002	11.21
Debreno's priest brother is shot by a sniper while performing a funeral service and the investigation leads to a lawsuit against another priest charged with sexual misconduct. Meanwhile, Nancy becomes obsessed with learning the identity of a young woman whose body she discovered.
51	6	"Old Wounds"	David Jackson	Peter M. Lenkov	November 1, 2002	10.99
Mannion gets another chance to capture a contract killer who eluded him 25 years ago when the chief learns the hitman is in D.C. In other events, Nancy gets hurt while pursuing a purse-snatcher and receives more bad news in the hospital, Kendall has to apologize for allowing her picture to be taken with a mayoral candidate who's critical of the police department and Ella begins to question whether she should get married.
52	7	"The Second Man"	Jerry Levine	Alan Ormsby	November 8, 2002	12.85
Noland shoots a college student he thought was going to rob a convenience store, but the investigation fails to turn up a weapon. To make things worse, Internal Affairs demands that Noland be suspended and the student's wealthy parents threaten to press charges.
53	8	"Free-Fire Zone"	Christopher Taylor	David Fallon	November 15, 2002	9.67
A reporter accuses Mannion of committing a war crime in Vietnam 32 years ago by ordering the execution of 18 innocent people and one of the chief's fellow soldiers confirms the story. Meanwhile, Temple and Debreno look for a 15-year-old boy they think is planning to commit murder to join a gang.
54	9	"Return of the King"	Jim Charleston	Michael Ostrowski	November 22, 2002	11.24
A boxing champion's wife is found murdered in her hotel room and Temple comes under suspicion due to a past relationship with the victim, who had been abused by her husband. In the meantime, a custodial worker is discovered to have a fake identity.
55	10	"Small Packages"	Jim Chory	Peter M. Lenkov	December 13, 2002	9.95
On Christmas, Temple and Debreno look for three men disguised as elves who stole a mission full of donations to help feed 2,000 homeless people, Mannion dresses as Santa and promises an 8-year-old boy that he'll bring his mother home from prison and Nancy and Brander find a baby in a manger scene.
56	11	"Goodbye, Jenny"	Christopher Taylor	Pam Veasey & John Wirth	January 17, 2003	10.47
Mannion comforts a friend dying of AIDS. In other events, $500,000 worth of cocaine disappears from the evidence warehouse, Ella is sued by a man after saving him from a near-fatal fall and Temple isn't sure what to do when a woman in the gun lab comes onto him.
57	12	"Untouchable"	David Jackson	Patricia Green	January 24, 2003	9.82
A law student attempts to commit the perfect crime by killing a stranger, confessing to the murder and recanting the confession. Meanwhile, Nancy tries to figure out the identity of a dead girl found in an alley and Kendall tries to end her relationship with a married man.
58	13	"Sacrifices"	Deran Sarafian	Jonathan Lisco	January 31, 2003	10.23
A suspected terrorist is brought in with a potentially deadly virus, putting headquarters in quarantine when the suspect infects Brander and Temple.
59	14	"Blindsided"	Jim Charleston	Pam Veasey & John Wirth	February 7, 2003	10.63
Mannion and Vanessa fly to Los Angeles and get carjacked. Meanwhile, back in D.C., Deputy Mayor Lockhart asks Debreno to help find a blackmailer with a scandalous videotape that could end her career, Kendall's ex-boyfriend threatens her and the mayor offers Ella a job.
60	15	"Back in the Saddle"	Ricardo Mendez Matta	Peter M. Lenkov	February 14, 2003	10.86
Debreno is assigned to protect a popular singer set to perform at the Kennedy Center Honors who's received a death threat. In other events, Mannion becomes a uniformed cop in order to lead by example and Clive argues with Ella over her turning down a job in the mayor's office without having a discussion first.
61	16	"Last Waltz"	Jim Chory	David Fallon	February 28, 2003	10.69
Mannion's old partner arrives from New York and gets involved in a murder investigation. In the meantime, a woman scheduled to testify in a fatal shooting case in Chicago talks Debreno and Nancy into letting her visit her daughter first and Ella believes that an officer being hailed as a hero for rescuing a woman from a building burning isn't telling the whole truth.
62	17	"Where There's Smoke"	Christopher Taylor	Michael Daly & Brigid O'Connor Maple	March 14, 2003	10.25
Mannion takes on a powerful city commissioner he believes is partially to blame for the cutbacks that have forced the chief to lay off officers. The move makes the mayor so upset he looks for an excuse to fire Mannion. Meanwhile, a congressional witness in a fraud trial claims that important documents were stolen from his hotel room and Nancy and Brander get hurt in an accident while pursuing a suspect.
63	18	"Bloodlines"	Pam Veasey	Story by : Jasmine Love; Teleplay by : Greggory Nations	April 11, 2003	7.74
Mannion trails a killer targeting interracial couples, one of whom is a black councilman married to a white woman. Back at the office, Ella finds evidence that implies an officer up for a commendation could be an arsonist. In the meantime, Nancy arrests her father for soliciting a prostitute and Temple helps a junkie kick his drug habit.
64	19	"Criminally Insane"	Jim Chory	Patricia Green & Jonathan Lisco	April 25, 2003	10.19
The mayor is more determined to have Mannion fired when a man is arrested and allegedly dies in custody because of an officer's failure to follow procedures. Things get even more intense when the mayor's mentally disturbed son disappears after two cops take him to a hospital.
65	20	"Rage"	David Jackson	David Fallon	May 2, 2003	8.51
The mayor blames Mannion for riots in the streets when the chief refuses to fire an officer accused of police brutality. In other events, a friend and informant of Temple's is injured during a drug deal and Ella's husband gives Mannion some alarming news.
66	21	"Ella Mae"	Oz Scott	Story by : Jason Wilborn; Teleplay by : Michael Ostrowski & Jasmine Love	May 9, 2003	11.05
Mannion copes with Ella's death from a stroke, but it could bring hope to a boy waiting for a heart transplant. In the meantime, Mannion helps Clive look for Ricky and Temple and Debreno search for the man who shot one of their informants.
67	22	"Into the Sunset"	Craig T. Nelson	Peter M. Lenkov	May 16, 2003	10.41
Mannion goes west to take some rest from Ella's death and his recent dismissal. During a game of golf in Arizona, he finds a severed human finger on the course and brings it to a local sheriff, beginning an investigation that leads them to a Mexican drug lord and dirty cops. Meanwhile, back in D.C., Mannion's ex-wife Sherry meets Vanessa when she arrives at headquarters looking for him.

=== Season 4 (2003–04) ===
No. overall	No. in season	Title	Directed by	Written by	Original release date	U.S. viewers (millions)
68	1	"Jack's Back"	Oz Scott	Pam Veasey & Peter M. Lenkov	September 26, 2003	11.82
Jack returns to D.C. to get his job back as chief of police, but the mayor has other ideas. In the meantime, Temple is arrested for a drug dealer's murder based on an eyewitness's testimony.
69	2	"The Devil You Know..."	James Keach	Patricia Green	October 3, 2003	9.89
Mannion's replacement as police chief makes an error in judgment that leads to the death of an innocent woman. Hoping to get his old job back, Mannion brings his team together to take down a notorious drug dealer, while Temple confronts Debreno about the latter's one-night stand.
70	3	"Free Byrd"	Rick Rosenthal	David Fallon	October 10, 2003	10.46
An ex-convict is a suspect when his girlfriend is discovered to have fallen to her death from a third-story apartment window. In other events, Mannion tries to talk to Sherry into moving to Washington, D.C. and working for him and Temple sets a trap for a pair of police officers he suspects of using excessive force on suspects.
71	4	"The Kindness of Strangers"	Christopher Taylor	Bruce Zimmerman	October 17, 2003	10.19
Noland discovers that his 12-year-old niece had been contacted over the Internet by a pedophile who convinced her to run away and meet him, so the deputy chief races to find him, believing that the suspect had lured several other girls away and killed them. Meanwhile, Temple is picked on by two fellow officers for his part in bringing down a pair of violent cops.
72	5	"Blind Eye"	Jerry Levine	Jonathan Lisco	October 24, 2003	8.27
Mannion discovers an underground system of justice created in a neighborhood whose citizens are fed up with unfair treatment by the police and the courts. In the meantime, Temple hires a lawyer to defend him in a wrongful death suit and Nancy and Brander prepare for a test to become detectives.
73	6	"Jupiter for Sale"	Oz Scott	Tom Spezialy	October 31, 2003	9.18
The citizens of D.C. start to panic when a serial killer who murdered 11 people in 1985 but was never caught is reportedly behind a recent similar slaying. The reports seem to be accurate due to a letter allegedly written by the killer claiming responsibility. Noland brings in the former cop who originally worked on the case, but Mannion doesn't trust him.
74	7	"A House Divided"	Joe Napolitano	Peter M. Lenkov	November 7, 2003	8.95
Mannion participates in a Civil War reenactment when a man playing a Confederate is shot and killed. The evidence suggests it was murder. Meanwhile, Vanessa confronts Sherry after one of her clients is wounded in a botched sting operation and Noland uncovers surprising news while tracing his ancrestry.
75	8	"Acceptable Losses"	Kevin Dowling	Jasmine Love	November 14, 2003	9.83
Ricky and a friend end up in the hospital after they collapse during a birthday party. It seems the children accidentally ingested drugs, so Mannion tracks down the culprits. In the meantime, Brander pursues a man involved in an ATM robbery.
76	9	"In God We Trust"	David Jackson	Pam Veasey	November 21, 2003	10.47
Mannion sees a vision of the Virgin Mary on the window of his apartment building before money from a 46-year-old robbery falls from the sky. He soon realizes that a modern-day Robin Hood is at work when thousands of dollars' worth of clothes also come tumbling down. Meanwhile, Temple's wrongful-death case goes to trial.
77	10	"Hollow Spaces"	Christopher Taylor	Anthony Sparks	December 12, 2003	9.09
The teen who received Ella's heart is suspected of robbing a gas station, but he swears he's innocent. In other events, Nancy and her mom are carjacked and the mayor refuses to pay the hefty damages awarded to Temple in his wrongful-death case.
78	11	"The Voice Inside"	Oz Scott	Peter M. Lenkov	December 19, 2003	9.31
An 8-year-old autistic girl won't talk after witnessing her parents' murder, so Mannion brings in a former hostage negotiator to bond with her. Meanwhile, Nancy suspects foul play when she receives a blood-stained dress from her dry cleaner that belongs to someone else.
79	12	"Breath of Life"	Eric Laneuville	Frederick Rappaport	January 16, 2004	10.11
Brander discovers that the bloodied police officer he gave mouth-to-mouth resuscitation is gay and the injured cop's partner is suspected of doing little to help. The investigation reveals that the injury happened when a car hit the officer and sped away and Mannion trails the case to a college campus where he realizes that serious crimes are being ignored.
80	13	"Party Favors"	Christopher Taylor	Chris Manheim	January 23, 2004	10.01
A lobbyist who had been working on a tell-all book about senators and congressmen trading votes for sexual favors is found hanging from a rope in her condo. The case gets personal for Mannion when he discovers that the woman's ghost writer is a disgraced journalist who was once engaged to the chief's daughter. In the meantime, Gwen gets arrested during a protest outside the offices of an HMO.
81	14	"a.k.a."	Jim Charleston	Bruce Zimmerman	February 6, 2004	9.52
A woman in the Witness Protection Program is killed in a hit-and-run accident, leaving Mannion to wonder if she was murdered. He also gets a sandwich named after him at a restaurant, but several people get sick from eating it. Meanwhile, Temple works after hours as a security guard and prepares for an ambassador's reception.
82	15	"D.C. Confidential"	Larry Moore & Oz Scott	Patricia Green	February 13, 2004	8.93
An old black man is murdered around midnight after he visits the Korean War Memorial and the investigation reveals that he may have been connected to a jazz singer's death in the 1950s, which also involves Ella's uncle. In the meantime, Mannion is reluctant to let Sherry move into Ella's old office.
83	16	"On Guard"	Joe Ann Fogle	David Fallon	February 20, 2004	9.88
Mannion believes his fencing instructor's claim that she killed her husband in self-defense, while Debreno discovers that an old friend who apparently died in an accident five years ago could still be alive and on the streets.
84	17	"Family Values"	Eric Laneuville	Jonathan Lisco	February 27, 2004	9.40
An 8-year-old girl is abducted from a city park and the kidnapper demands a hefty ransom. Sherry gets hit by gunfire while pursuing the kidnapper, who's believed to be holding the girl in a warehouse. In the meantime, Mannion's new director of police administration has a bizarre first day that begins with the chief forgetting that he hired her.
85	18	"The Black Widow Maker"	Jonathan LaPaglia	Tom Spezialy	April 2, 2004	8.70
Mannion flies to Iowa when a warrant for his arrest is issued for failure to pay a fine and he gets involved in a murder case where a newlywed is accused of killing her husband on their honeymoon, the woman being an ex-girlfriend of Brander's. Meanwhile, back in D.C., Temple's investigation of an armored-truck robbery is complicated by his feelings for the woman in charge of security.
86	19	"Passing Time"	Oz Scott	Peter M. Lenkov & Bruce Zimmerman	April 16, 2004	9.33
A woman walks into a bar and shoots a doctor she blames for the death of her terminally ill mother. The investigation reveals that the mother left her estate to the physician and nothing to her daughter. In other events, Nancy's ill father asks her to help end his life when he's unable to take care of himself and Mannion gets obsessed with figuring out who keeps leaving notes in a suggestion box criticizing his wardrobe.
87	20	"Ten Thirty-Three"	James Keach	Story by : Craig T. Nelson; Teleplay by : Tom Spezialy & Pam Veasey	April 23, 2004	8.61
Mannion investigates a gang shooting outside a church and Gwen suspects that one of the boys may be the son who was taken away from her.
88	21	"Open Season"	Blake T. Evans	Pam Veasey & Anthony Sparks	May 7, 2004	8.36
Noland is shot by a gang member in apparent retaliation for Mannion's takedown of an area gang. After getting a look at the shooter, Mannion believes it's Tico, Maria's brother, leading her to clash with Debreno.
89	22	"Something Borrowed, Something Bruised"	Oz Scott	Jasmine Love & Noah Nelson	May 14, 2004	9.68
As Noland recovers from his bullet wounds, Mannion prepares for his daughter's wedding. On the way to the ceremony, Mannion discovers the body of a woman at a toxic-waste dump and her identity comes as a shock to everyone. Another victim is later found at the same location.
