= Senk =

Senk is a surname with multiple origins. In Slovenia, the Czech Republic, and Slovakia, it is often spelled Šenk. The Czech/Slovak feminine form is Šenková.

- Matt Senk, American baseball coach
- Nina Šenk (born 1982), Slovenian composer
- Nuša Šenk (born 1984), Slovenian model
- Jana Šenková (born 1982), Czech volleyball player
