= Kesić =

Kesić (Serbian Cyrillic: Kecић) is a South Slavic surname. Notable people with the surname include:

- Aleksandar Kesić (born 1987), Serbian footballer
- Zoran Kesić (born 1976), Serbian TV presenter
