= List of The Agency episodes =

The Agency is a CBS television show that followed the inner workings of the United States Central Intelligence Agency. The series was created by Michael Frost Beckner and was executive produced by Michael Frost Beckner, Shaun Cassidy Productions and Radiant Productions in association with Universal Network Television and CBS Productions. It aired from September 27, 2001, until May 17, 2003, lasting two seasons. It featured unprecedented filming from the actual CIA headquarters.

== Series overview ==
| Season | Episodes | Originally released | |
| Season | Episodes | First released | Last released |
|---|---|---|---|
| 1 | 22 | September 27, 2001 | May 9, 2002 |
| 2 | 22 | September 28, 2002 | May 17, 2003 |

== Episodes ==
=== Season 1 (2001–02) ===
| No. overall | No. in season | Title | Directed by | Written by | Original release date | Prod. code | Viewers (millions) |
|---|---|---|---|---|---|---|---|
| 1 | 1 | "Viva Fidel!" | Alex Zakrzewski | James Bannon | September 27, 2001 | 105 | 11.98 |
After unearthing a secret plot by Castro's own men to assassinate him, the agents rush to thwart the plan in order to prevent the U.S. from being framed for his murder.
| 2 | 2 | "God's Work" | Robert Berlinger | Mason Alley | October 4, 2001 | 104 | 8.95 |
When the CIA misidentifies a missionary plane in Colombian drug-trafficking airspace and the Colombians shoot it down, Director Pierce (Ronny Cox) must try to clean up the mess, while the former CIA director tempts Carl to betray Pierce. Meanwhile, Matt (Gil Bellows) and Lisa (Gloria Reuben) must contend with a dead body when a foreign agent dies while attempting to sell the CIA classified information.
| 3 | 3 | "The Year of Lying Dangerously" | Nick Gomez | Melissa Rosenberg | October 18, 2001 | 102 | 9.06 |
The local governor plans a political coup after some American miners are taken hostage in Indonesia.
| 4 | 4 | "In Our Own Backyard" | David Platt | Ed Zuckerman | October 25, 2001 | 106 | 10.30 |
The CIA and the FBI learn a New Jersey man who was murdered was a former Russian spy (sleeper agent) with a suitcase nuke hidden underground in his backyard fallout shelter for more than a decade. Also, Terri's ex husband hires a detective to gather information on her for their divorce.
| 5 | 5 | "Pilot" | Mikael Salomon | Michael Frost Beckner | November 1, 2001 | 100 | 9.42 |
When an agent dies in the line of duty, the CIA learns of an impending terrorist attack somewhere in Europe. Matt tries to convince a Syrian diplomat to divulge information about the location of the attack, but he'll only cooperate if his family is brought safely to the U.S. Note: This episode was written in March 2001 and filmed as the series premiere once CBS picked up the show for the 2001-02 season; it was moved further down into the Season 1 order so that it had distance from the 9/11 attacks.
| 6 | 6 | "Anthrax" | Randy Zisk | Doug Palau | November 8, 2001 | 103 | 11.17 |
A terrorist uses anthrax as a biological weapon to murder two Belgian kennel owners and more than 20 dogs, which leads Matt to suspect the killer will strike again on a larger scale.
| 7 | 7 | "Closure" | Nick Gomez | Ed Zuckerman | November 15, 2001 | 107 | 11.43 |
In an effort to learn the truth about his brother's mysterious death, Matt begins piecing together clues and finally forces his superiors to tell him the truth. As Matt begins to gather information about his brother Eric's final mission abroad, he poses painful questions about the mysterious death to his parents and finally forces Jackson Haisley (Will Patton), Carl Reese (Rocky Carroll) and Director Pierce to explain the circumstances so he can get Eric's body back for a proper burial. Meanwhile, Jackson, Terri and Joshua are working to entrap an Indian Intelligence Bureau double-agent working for his own country against the CIA to acquire a submarine capable of launching nuclear weapons.
| 8 | 8 | "Nocturne" | Kenneth Fink | Michael Frost Beckner & Melissa Rosenberg | November 29, 2001 | 108 | 10.28 |
The CIA conducts an internal investigation when it suspects Jackson of leaking sensitive information. In order to test Jackson's loyalty to the CIA, Matt and Carl secretly recruit the Persian cellist with whom he is romantically involved to gain information about a terrorist threat at the Yemeni embassy. Meanwhile, Terri must forge a 50-year-old document implicating the CIA in illegal activity involving the Dalai Lama that would prove calamitous for present-day Tibet should it fall into Chinese possession.
| 9 | 9 | "Rules of the Game" | Nick Gomez | Ed Zuckerman | December 6, 2001 | 109 | 10.87 |
When the National Security Agency (NSA) learns of a plot to assassinate the King of Saudi Arabia, Matt and Lisa help track down those involved only to discover that there is a larger terrorist plot in the works. Soon after Matt and Lisa catch the would-be assassins, Israeli intelligence informs the CIA that one of the incarcerated terrorists is their own agent on an undercover mission and requests his safe return. Once Matt arranges this, the Agency discovers that Israeli intelligence has deceived them and the man they released is a link to a terrorist they had been pursuing for years.
| 10 | 10 | "Deadline" | Mikael Salomon | Michael Frost Beckner | December 20, 2001 | 101 | 11.43 |
An ambitious journalist plans to run a career-making story about one of the Agency's great Cold War successes, which will expose and therefore cost the life of a now retired Russian general who risked his life to help Director Pierce and the CIA. The journalist refuses to kill the story, and Director Pierce and his team must do everything they can to protect the Russian, even if it means putting another life in jeopardy. Meanwhile, Terri's estranged husband begins divorce proceedings, and Matt pushes Jackson for answers about his brother's mysterious death.
| 11 | 11 | "Son Set" | Paul Michael Glaser | Doug Palau & Mason Alley | January 17, 2002 | 110 | 9.86 |
After the young son of a British Intelligence officer is kidnapped and the man fails to report him missing, the CIA and British Intelligence's investigation takes an unusual turn. They learn that the man did not report his child missing because the kidnappers are Iraqis and he has arranged to trade plans for an Allied invasion of Iraq in exchange for his son's return. Matt and Carl join the investigators in London to ensure that the officer's plan is derailed without losing the boy in the process. Meanwhile, Robert Quinn, who is temporarily replacing Director Pierce, starts implementing changes. Daniel Benzali guest stars.
| 12 | 12 | "The Enemy Within" | Philip Sgriccia | Vivienne Radkoff | January 24, 2002 | 111 | 11.44 |
After the daughter of the United States Ambassador to Greece is kidnapped by terrorists, Matt and Jackson attempt to track her down. Following the abduction, the CIA reveals to the ambassador that the young woman has actually been working undercover for them for several years. Matt and Jackson think they have successfully rescued her, but then realize they have an impostor and must save the real girl before she is murdered. Meanwhile, Robert uses Lisa to get important information from Patrice, which he turns against her.
| 13 | 13 | "The Golden Hour" | Paul Michael Glaser | Shaun Cassidy & Ed Zuckerman | January 31, 2002 | 113 | 10.97 |
An assassination attempt on Lisa strikes Matt instead and leaves him hospitalized and fighting for his life, while the CIA investigates the ugly white guy who shot her. While Robert tries to hide the events from the press, Jackson is forced to work with the chief of counterintelligence to determine who ordered the attack on Lisa and how her position at the CIA was uncovered. While Lex admits that he accidentally tipped off the shooter to Lisa's identity, he redeems himself by uncovering information that the white guy shooter was a neo-Nazi who was working with fanatics in Pakistan to form a new Jihadist-Nazi alliance against world Jewry. As Matt hangs on to his life by a thread, Lisa contemplates a leave of absence from the CIA.
| 14 | 14 | "The Gauntlet" | Michael Watkins | Michael Frost Beckner & Melissa Rosenberg | February 7, 2002 | 112 | 10.89 |
Matt and Terri go to Belarus to gather information about an arms shipment to Iraq. When Terri discovers Matt is in danger, she blows her cover to save him and the mission, and winds up a prisoner herself. Senator Tom Gage joins the agency as the new director.
| 15 | 15 | "Sleeping Dogs Lie" | Arvin Brown | Ed Zuckerman & Shaun Cassidy | February 28, 2002 | 114 | 12.08 |
On his first day as the new director of the CIA, former Senator Tom Gage is immediately confronted with a high-profile crisis when the Agency is linked to the death of a young Vietnamese man in Washington D.C. As Tom works with Jackson and Carl to learn how the CIA was involved, he discovers that when Robert was acting as the director of the CIA, his secret negotiations with a Middle Eastern prince were directly responsible for the Vietnamese man's murder. Tom must find a way to hide the Agency's involvement without implicating an innocent man for the crime. Meanwhile, Terri runs into a photographer whom she realizes is linked to a radical anti-abortion group that has bombed women's health clinics.
| 16 | 16 | "The Plague Year" | J. Miller Tobin | James Duff | March 7, 2002 | 115 | 10.89 |
The CIA tracks an Algerian suicide bomber as he enters the U.S., but the agents do not realize he is infected with smallpox until he is taken into custody. When they learn his mission is to infect the Agency first, the agents race to ensure the virus is contained before more people are infected.
| 17 | 17 | "Moo" | Robert Berlinger | Shaun Cassidy & Ed Zuckerman | March 28, 2002 | 116 | 10.78 |
A former corporal who served under Gage in Vietnam accuses him of committing a war crime that involved murdering civilians. Meanwhile, Matt and Jackson receive word that a visiting Eastern European dictator is near death and they enlist a prostitute to help determine how ill he really is. At the same time, Joshua must deal with a museum curator when he accidentally destroys a cow costume that's part of an upcoming World War II exhibit.
| 18 | 18 | "The Greater Good" | Michael Watkins | Melissa Rosenberg & Michael Frost Beckner | April 4, 2002 | 117 | 9.43 |
The Agency learns about a chemical weapons plant in the Sudan that must be bombed, although it will put 150 innocent enslaved workers in danger. Jackson devises a plan to save them. Meanwhile, the CIA prepares a memorial service to honor an agent, but Quinn tries to turn it into a media event. Carl and Tom step in to honor the family's request for a quiet tribute.
| 19 | 19 | "Peacemakers" | Joe Chappelle | Mason Alley | April 18, 2002 | 119 | 10.61 |
The chief intelligence officers from India and Pakistan meet with Gage at the Agency's headquarters to head off a nuclear war. Meanwhile, Carl's son visits him and gives his father some disturbing news.
| 20 | 20 | "The Understudy" | Alex Zakrzewski | James Duff | April 25, 2002 | 118 | 10.00 |
Jackson assumes the identity of an arms dealer so he can try to sell weapons to the Russian mob, and is taken hostage by the mobsters. As the CIA tries to decide how to handle the situation, he develops an odd relationship with his captor and his son. Meanwhile, Lisa Fabrizzi returns from a leave of absence and brings with her some surprising news.
| 21 | 21 | "Doublecrossover" | Paul Michael Glaser | Ed Zuckerman & Shaun Cassidy | May 2, 2002 | 120 | 11.16 |
A CIA agent is murdered in Washington and the CIA is forced to join with the police force to find the killer. Chief Jack Mannion (Craig T. Nelson) visits the CIA headquarters to meet with Gage and Quinn to learn what they might be withholding. While Matt and Haisley work with Mannion's team, Detectives Temple Page (Sean Patrick Thomas) and Kevin Debreno (Jonathan LaPaglia) attempt to track down the men responsible. This episode concludes a crossover with The District that begins on "Shell Game".
| 22 | 22 | "Finale" | Michael Nankin | Michael Frost Beckner & Melissa Rosenberg | May 9, 2002 | 121 | 10.49 |
When a CIA agent posing as a diplomat is taken hostage in Uzbekistan, Gage sends Matt and Terri to save him. Lisa predicts another terrorist attack will strike D.C., which raises concerns among her co-workers. Jackson's romance disintegrates when his girlfriend believes he's secretly working against the CIA.

=== Season 2 (2002–03) ===
| No. overall | No. in season | Title | Directed by | Written by | Original release date | Prod. code | Viewers (millions) |
|---|---|---|---|---|---|---|---|
| 23 | 1 | "French Kiss" | Jeff Woolnough | Shaun Cassidy & Ed Zuckerman | September 28, 2002 | 202 | 9.65 |
CIA agents go to France to find Matt's killer. When the Secret Service, CIA, FBI, and INS fail to inform each other, Robert Quinn forms an Incident Response Team to liaison between all the agencies.
| 24 | 2 | "Air Lex" | Alex Zakrzewski | Doris Egan | October 5, 2002 | 203 | 10.21 |
Gage must decide whether a hijacked plane carrying Stiles and Lex should be shot down.
| 25 | 3 | "The Great Game" | Peter Markle | Jennifer Brandes & Chris Helper | October 12, 2002 | 201 | 9.57 |
Terri and Stiles receive death threats as they and Lex oversee the formation of a new Afghan Ministry of Intelligence in Kabul, Afghanistan. Meanwhile, Gage deals with the new Afghan Intelligence Minister, who has a shaky past.
| 26 | 4 | "C.S. Lie" | Michael Watkins | Larry Moskowitz | October 19, 2002 | 204 | 9.17 |
When a CIA plane crashes in China, the operatives must hide all the evidence before it is discovered.
| 27 | 5 | "The Prisoner" | J. Miller Tobin | Daniel Arkin | October 26, 2002 | 206 | 9.41 |
When Gage discovers that a potential Iraqi defector has been held prisoner in the U.S. for the last six years, he authorizes a mission to take the man back to his homeland to identify a weapons site.
| 28 | 6 | "Home Grown" | Alex Zakrzewski | James Kahn | November 2, 2002 | 205 | 9.89 |
The Agency discovers that a suicide bomber, responsible for the deaths of 14 people in an amusement park, was an American citizen belonging to a terrorist ring.
| 29 | 7 | "Heartless" | Jay Tobias | Doris Egan | November 9, 2002 | 207 | 9.19 |
A blown operation leads to a Senate inquiry into possible wrongdoings at the CIA. The agency tries to turn a Colombian druglord and terrorist into an informant, but the operation goes awry when a DEA officer tips off the police about the operation, causing the deaths of seven people.
| 30 | 8 | "First Born" | J. Miller Tobin | Chris Hepler & Jennifer Brandes | November 16, 2002 | 208 | 8.51 |
The president's brother is in an accident, which puts the CIA in a bind.
| 31 | 9 | "Thanksgiving" | Harry Winer | Larry Moskowitz | November 23, 2002 | 209 | 10.87 |
When Quinn reports that Stiles is missing, the agents forgo their Thanksgiving plans to help locate him.
| 32 | 10 | "Trust" | Winrich Kolbe | Daniel Arkin | December 6, 2002 | 210 | 6.22 |
Is Gage wanted by the FBI? The agents think so - they're about to discover what he is really up to.
| 33 | 11 | "Elite Meat to Eat" | Joe Chappelle | Shaun Cassidy & Doris Egan | December 14, 2002 | 211 | 9.11 |
Terri is taken to Stiles at his home. The Incident Response Team heads to Ireland to stop arms dealers.
| 34 | 12 | "An Isolated Incident" | Peter Markle | Ed Zuckerman & Larry Moskowitz | January 18, 2003 | 212 | 8.43 |
Stiles and Terri head to the Gaza Strip in search of a U.S. citizen who left America with his wife following a killing spree at a travel agency.
| 35 | 13 | "Debbie Does Djakarta" | Adam Davidson | Erik Oleson | February 1, 2003 | 213 | 9.08 |
The CIA plans to publicly discredit a profoundly anti-American Indonesian cleric who is the favorite to become Indonesia's next President, but former U.S. President James Graydon wants to see the election proceed properly.
| 36 | 14 | "Coventry" | J. Miller Tobin | Shaun Cassidy & Doris Egan | February 8, 2003 | 214 | 10.09 |
Lex learns that a possible bomb attack may occur in Australia. Gage doesn't want to act because he is afraid that the terrorists may carry out another attack on the U.S.
| 37 | 15 | "Absolute Bastard" | J. Miller Tobin | Daniel Arkin | February 15, 2003 | 216 | 9.18 |
Stiles heads to west Africa, to help former CIA informants, and runs into someone he used to love.
| 38 | 16 | "Unholy Alliances" | Harry Winer | Story by : Erik Oleson; Teleplay by : Erik Oleson & Larry Moskowitz | February 22, 2003 | 217 | 10.51 |
Gage goes to Israel to help with peace talks.
| 39 | 17 | "Soft Kills" | Peter Markle | Erik Oleson | March 15, 2003 | 215 | 8.74 |
Terri, Stiles and Lex try to stay out of danger when they go to Spain to find out why a number of military wives were attacked and/or killed, while an operation at home finds unusual connections between international terrorists and people of high status inside Spain itself.
| 40 | 18 | "Spy Finance" | Rod Hardy | Ed Zuckerman | April 12, 2003 | 219 | 7.23 |
Stiles tries to stop an organized crime ring from buying heroin from terrorists. Can Stiles and the Agency persuade the organized crime figure to help capture the terrorists?
| 41 | 19 | "War, Inc." | J. Miller Tobin | Erik Oleson | April 26, 2003 | 220 | 8.39 |
A CEO whose firm saw over 200 employees murdered in the 9/11 attacks starts a bloody private war against the Saudi Royal Family, and the CIA has to stop the situation from becoming a global catastrophe.
| 42 | 20 | "Mi Cena Con Andrei" | Ian Toynton | Doris Egan | May 3, 2003 | 218 | 6.56 |
After several people die from a super virus, the agency tries to find out if the creator of the virus is responsible. Stiles travels to Mexico City to see if the scientist is guilty, but as his investigations proceed, Stiles begins to believe the scientist is innocent. After finding out where the virus is made, Stiles enters the laboratory and finds a lot of empty vials. Haisley discovers that the scientist's records list 75 vials, but only 73 are present in the lab. Besides one vile previously used on Mexican Army soldiers, they believe one vile is in the hands of a Mexican revolutionary group and headed to the U.S. Haisley later learns that Stiles and Teri may have killed the wrong man, and that the missing vile was in fact stolen by the revolutionary group, since evidence emerges that the scientist may have in fact been making a vaccine for the virus.
| 43 | 21 | "Our Man in Korea" | Larry Shaw | Terry Curtis Fox | May 10, 2003 | 221 | 7.57 |
Terri learns that Brian, the man she dated in college, might be a double agent, because his company could be shipping weapons to North Korea, though this may be without his knowledge. Meanwhile, Quinn discovers that his sister is dying. When she commits suicide in her car, he kisses her goodbye. Terri and Stiles continue try to find the guidance system bound for North Korea. Caroline finds out that her husband Brian is under suspicion, and attempts to protect him. When Terri goes to meet Brian and finds him dead, his wife is questioned about whether she'd received bad information, and if she killed him as a result.
| 44 | 22 | "Our Man in Washington" | Alex Zakrzewski | Ed Zuckerman | May 17, 2003 | 222 | 8.73 |
As Haisley and Lex's investigation into Terri's abduction reveals more details, Haisley suspects that Joshua may be a double agent. Haisley reports his findings to Quinn, and is shocked by what Quinn tells him. Meanwhile, Stiles' attempt to rescue Terri puts both of them in danger when he is discovered. Her captors are forced to flee with Joshua, but not before detonating the bomb they'd attached to Terri's neck. This episode ends the season, as well as the series, with a cliffhanger that was never resolved.

== Home video releases ==
| Season | Episodes | DVD release dates | | | |
| Season | Episodes | Region 1 | Region 2 | Region 4 | Discs |
|---|---|---|---|---|---|
| 1 | 22 | TBA | October 4, 2004 | TBA | TBA |
| 2 | 22 | TBA | TBA | TBA | TBA |
| Total | 44 | TBA | TBA | TBA | TBA |
