= Bekan =

Bekan may refer to:

Places

- Bekan, County Mayo, a village in County Mayo, Ireland
- Bekan, Russia, a rural locality (a settlement) under the administrative jurisdiction of Ardon Town Under District Jurisdiction in Ardonsky District of the Republic of North Ossetia–Alania, Russia

People

- Aleksandar Todorović Bekan, a co-host of Fajront Republika, a Serbian talk/sketch show
