= Srpski Top Model season 1 =

Srpski Top Model
- Season 1
- The cast of Srpski Top Model
- No. of episodes: 13

Release
- Original network: Prva
- Original release: March 16 – June 6, 2011

Srpski Top Model Season 1 (Serbian Top Model) is the first season of the reality documentary based on Tyra Banks' America's Next Top Model. It started on March 16, 2011 and featured 15 contestants fighting for the title of the new Serbian Top Model, as well as a 2-year modeling contract with Click Fashion Agency, appear on the cover and editorials of Grazia magazine and an all-expenses trip to Israel, in hopes of a promising career start in the modeling industry.

A panel of judges, which included Serbian top model Ivana Stanković, photographer Miša Obradović and fashion producer and Click Fashion Agency's owner Nenad Radujević, evaluated the girls in a weekly judging session, making eliminations until only three were left.

The cast was officially released to the press on March 15, 2011. The show started airing on March 16 and finished on June 6. Eighteen-year-old Neda Stojanović from Novi Pazar won, defeating Bojana Banjca and Milica Đorđević. During the show, Neda was spotted by a French & Italian modelling scout backstage at Belgrade Fashion Week.

== Contestants ==
(ages stated are at start of contest)

Contestant	Age	Height	Hometown	Finish	Place
Jelena Jokić	20	1.78 m (5 ft 10 in)	Bačka Topola	Episode 1	15
Milica Paravina	19	1.70 m (5 ft 7 in)	Crvenka	Episode 2	14
Jelena Petrović	21	1.74 m (5 ft 8 1/2 in)	Zaječar	Episode 3	13
Tamara Vidić	20	1.80 m (5 ft 11 in)	Knin	Episode 4	12 (quit)
Anamari Ćulafić	21	1.81 m (5 ft 11 1/2 in)	Berane	Episode 4	11
Tijana Bajin	18	1.73 m (5 ft 8 in)	Kikinda	Episode 5	10
Marina Žikić	21	1.76 m (5 ft 9 1/2 in)	Vrbas	Episode 7	9
Nera Pastor	21	1.66 m (5 ft 5 1/2 in)	Novi Sad	Episode 8	8
Dejana Živković	18	1.78 m (5 ft 10 in)	Belgrade	Episode 9	7
Kristina Marković	20	1.77 m (5 ft 9 1/2 in)	Belgrade	Episode 10	6
Katarina Kojadinović	19	1.74 m (5 ft 8 1/2 in)	Kragujevac	Episode 11	5–4
Ana Minkić	20	1.77 m (5 ft 9 1/2 in)	Niš	Episode 11	5–4
Milica Đorđević	19	1.72 m (5 ft 7 1/2 in)	Mladenovac	Episode 13	3
Bojana Banjac	19	1.73 m (5 ft 8 in)	Novi Sad	Episode 13	2
Neda Stojanović	18	1.76 m (5 ft 9 1/2 in)	Raška	Episode 13	1

== Summaries ==
=== Results table ===
Place	Model	Episodes												
Place	Model	1	2	3	4	5	6	7	8	9	10	11	13	
1	Neda	SAFE	SAFE	SAFE	SAFE	SAFE	SAFE	SAFE	SAFE	LOW	SAFE	SAFE	SAFE	WINNER
2	Bojana	SAFE	SAFE	SAFE	SAFE	LOW	OUT	SAFE	SAFE	SAFE	SAFE	LOW	SAFE	OUT
3	Milica Đ.	SAFE	SAFE	SAFE	LOW	SAFE	SAFE	SAFE	SAFE	SAFE	SAFE	SAFE	OUT	
5-4	Katarina	SAFE	SAFE	SAFE	SAFE	SAFE	SAFE	SAFE	LOW	LOW	SAFE	OUT		
5-4	Ana	SAFE	SAFE	SAFE	SAFE	SAFE	SAFE	SAFE	SAFE	SAFE	LOW	OUT		
6	Kristina	SAFE	SAFE	SAFE	SAFE	SAFE	SAFE	SAFE	LOW	SAFE	OUT			
7	Dejana	SAFE	SAFE	SAFE	SAFE	SAFE	SAFE	LOW	LOW	OUT				
8	Nera	SAFE	SAFE	LOW	LOW	LOW	SAFE	SAFE	OUT					
9	Marina	LOW	SAFE	SAFE	SAFE	SAFE	SAFE	OUT						
10	Tijana	SAFE	SAFE	OUT	SAFE	OUT								
11	Anamari	SAFE	SAFE	SAFE	OUT									
12	Tamara	SAFE	SAFE	LOW	QUIT									
13	Jelena P.	SAFE	SAFE	OUT										
14	Milica P.	LOW	OUT											
15	Jelena J.	OUT												

The contestant was in danger of elimination
The contestant was eliminated
The contestant was originally eliminated from the competition but was saved
The contestant withdrew from the competition
The contestant won the competition

=== Photo shoot guide ===
- Episode 1 photo shoot: Pin-up girls with vintage car
- Episode 2 photo shoot: Winds
- Episode 3 photo shoot: Snow queens in Kopaonik
- Episode 4 photo shoot: Underwater nymphs
- Episode 5 photo shoot: The simple life
- Episode 6 photo shoot: 40s classic beauty movie stars on Belgrade central station
- Episode 7 photo shoot: Battle with inner demons
- Episode 8 photo shoot: Jump!
- Episode 9 photo shoot: Bikers on fire
- Episode 10 photo shoot: Gender swap with drag queen
- Episode 11 photo shoot: Seafood on the beach
- Episode 13 photo shoot: Stuck in a spider web
