= Slovenski Top Model =

- Genre: Reality television
- Created by: Tyra Banks
- Presented by: Nuša Šenk
- Judges: Nuša Šenk, Irena Lušičić, Milan Gačanovič, Petra Windschnurer, Zoran Garevski
- No. of episodes: 14

Production
- Running time: 66 minutes (with commercials)

Original release
- Network: TV3
- Release: September 22 – December 22, 2010

Slovenski Top Model (English: Slovenia's Top Model) is a Slovenian reality documentary based on Tyra Banks' America's Next Top Model that pits contestants from Slovenia against each other in a variety of competitions to determine who will win title of the next Slovene Top Model and a lucrative modelling contract with Alen Kobilica Models agency, a spread in the Slovenian issue of Elle, car Seat Ibiza, the winner will also become face of Maybeline New York for Slovenia, she will receive mobile package Orto Muziq for 2 years and hopes of a successful future in the modeling business.

The competition is hosted by Slovene model Nuša Šenk who also serves as the lead judge with several industry experts serving as guest judges.

The first season started airing on September 22, 2010 and a finale was aired exactly three months later. 16 years old Maja Fučak from Koper was chosen to be Slovenia's Next Top Model.

== Cycles ==
Cycle	Premiere date	Winner	Runner-up	Other contestants in order of elimination	Number of contestants	International Destinations
1	22 September 2010	Maja Fučak	Tina Grebenšek	Aleksandra Kastrevc, Lejla Šabić (quit), Senta Margan, Maja Bulog, Samanta Škrjanec, Kamila Perko (quit), Ana Rant, Nika Matavž, Nika Mihelčič, Sara Ana Pelko, Martina Cifer, Lea Bernetič	14	Zakynthos; Grado; Milan; Belgrade
