= The District =

American crime drama series (2000–2004)

- Genre: Crime drama; Police procedural
- Created by: Terry George; Jack Maple
- Starring: Craig T. Nelson; Lynne Thigpen; Jayne Brook; Roger A. Brown; Sean Patrick Thomas; Justin Theroux; David O'Hara; Elizabeth Marvel; Jonathan LaPaglia
- Composer: Michael Hoenig
- Country of origin: United States
- Original language: English
- No. of seasons: 4
- No. of episodes: 89 (list of episodes)

Production
- Executive producers: Denise Di Novi; Terry George; Lynn Marie Latham; John Wirth
- Running time: 60 minutes
- Production companies: Di Novi Pictures; Studios USA Television (2000–2002) (seasons 1–2); Universal Network Television (2002–2004) (seasons 3–4); CBS Productions

Original release
- Network: CBS
- Release: October 7, 2000 – May 1, 2004

The District is an American crime drama and police procedural television series that aired on CBS from October 7, 2000, to May 1, 2004. The show followed the work and personal life of the chief of Washington, D.C.'s police department.

== Premise ==
Former Newark, New Jersey Police Commissioner and New York Transit police officer Jack Mannion is hired as the chief of the bureaucracy-laden Washington, D.C. police force. Together with his detectives and allies, he must fight crime as well as internal corruption and the powers of Congress in order to reorganize and renovate the force.

== Production ==
The District was inspired by the real-life experience of former New York City Deputy Police Commissioner Jack Maple. Along with Police Commissioner William Bratton, he had reorganized the NYPD, and one of the achievements was the CompStat program (comparative statistics), which has its own major role in the TV series. After the success in New York, the CompStat program has been adapted by other cities. However Jack Maple himself chose to publish his experiences—along with Chris Mitchell he wrote a book (The Crime Fighter, 2000), and along with Terry George he prepared a TV series concept. His impact on the storyline after season 1 was limited; he died of colon cancer on August 4, 2001.

Primary filming was in Los Angeles, with some location shooting in Washington, D.C.

== Episodes ==
| Season | Episodes | Originally released | |
| Season | Episodes | First released | Last released |
|---|---|---|---|
| 1 | 23 | October 7, 2000 | May 19, 2001 |
| 2 | 22 | September 29, 2001 | May 18, 2002 |
| 3 | 22 | September 28, 2002 | May 17, 2003 |
| 4 | 22 | September 27, 2003 | May 1, 2004 |

== Cast and characters ==
Cast

=== Main ===
| Character | Actor | Seasons | | | |
| Character | Actor | 1 | 2 | 3 | 4 |
|---|---|---|---|---|---|
| Chief Jack Mannion | Craig T. Nelson | Main | Main | Main | Main |
| Nick Pierce | Justin Theroux | Main | Recurring | | |
| Deputy Mayor Mary Ann Mitchell | Jayne Brook | Main | | Guest | |
| Ella Mae Farmer | Lynne Thigpen | Main | Main | Main | |
| Deputy Chief Joe Noland | Roger Aaron Brown | Main | Main | Main | Main |
| Detective Danny McGregor | David O'Hara | Main | | | |
| Officer/Detective Temple Page | Sean Patrick Thomas | Main | Main | Main | Main |
| Officer/Detective Nancy Parras | Elizabeth Marvel | Main | Main | Main | Main |
| Detective Kevin Debreno | Jonathan LaPaglia | | Main | Main | Main |

=== Recurring ===
- Jean Smart as Det. Sherry Regan
- Wayne Duvall as Sgt. Phil Brander
- Richard Burgi as Capt. Vincent Hunter
- Richard Fancy as U.S. Attorney Bruce Logan
- Segun Ajaga (season 1) and William Turner (seasons 2–3) as Ricky Alvarez
- Michelle Forbes as Helen York (season 1)
- John Amos as Mayor Ethan Baker (season 1)
- Kristen Wilson as MPD Press Secretary Kendall Truman (season 3)
- Christopher B. Duncan as Sgt. Ray Cutter (seasons 2–4)
- Gregory Alan Williams as Clive Rodgers (seasons 2–4)
- Rita S. Jett as Ferris Gluck (seasons 2–4)
- Ving Rhames as Attorney General Troy Hatch (season 3)
- Kelly Rutherford as Melinda Lockhart (season 3)
- Helen Bates as Carol Bodine (season 3)
- Joseph C. Phillips as Mayor Morgan Douglas (seasons 3–4)
- Jaclyn Smith as Vanessa Cavanaugh (seasons 3–4)
- Alexandra Barreto as Maria Rodriguez (seasons 3–4)
- Vanessa Bell Calloway as Gwen Hendrix (season 4)

Notes

- In 2001, Jean Smart was nominated for an Emmy Award for "Outstanding Guest Actress in a Drama Series" for her performance as "Sherry Regan".
- In 2003, Thigpen died of a cerebral hemorrhage in her Marina del Rey, California home. The show's third season finale killed off her character.

== Ratings ==
| Season | | U.S. ratings | Network | Rank |
|---|---|---|---|---|
| 1 | 2000–01 | 12.7 million | CBS | #35 |
| 2 | 2001–02 | 10.3 million | CBS | #49 |
| 3 | 2002–03 | 9.8 million | CBS | #60 |
| 4 | 2003–04 | 9.0 million | CBS | #65 |

Note: Throughout The District's entire run it was aired in a Saturday night timeslot and also it was the last American scripted series to air on its Saturday night schedule until Ransom debuted in 2017.

== International broadcasts ==
- In Australia, The District aired on the Nine Network in late night slots throughout its run.
- In Bulgaria, the first two seasons aired on Nova Television. The whole series was aired on AXN with subtitles and later on AXN Crime. Later Fox Crime repeated the first two seasons and the dub was rerecorded with the same actors. The third season started in October 2010.
- In Sweden, The District aired on TV4.
- In Poland, The District aired on the Universal Channel.
- In Germany, The District airs on VOX.
- In the United Kingdom, it aired on CBS Justice (formerly CBS Action) and was also previously broadcast in late night slots on ITV1.
- In Serbia, it aired on RTS.
- In Slovenia, it aired on the now defunct Prva TV, later it aired on Fox Life (Bulgaria & Balkans region).
- In Jamaica, The District aired on CVM TV.
- In Romania it aired on TVR1 and TVR2.
- In Italy it aired on Rai 2 from November 29, 2004 to 2008.
- In France, The District aired on France 2 (as Washington Police)
