= Emisija Koja Ide na Televiziju Poneđeljkom oko 9 uveče =

- Created by: The Books of Knjige
- Starring: Aleksandar Radunović; Goran Vujović; Veselin Gajović; Zoran Marković; Tomo Jokić
- Country of origin: Montenegro
- No. of episodes: 10

Production
- Production location: Montenegro
- Running time: 30 min

Original release
- Network: RTCG
- Release: 2004 – 2005

Emisija Koja Ide na Televiziju Poneđeljkom oko 9 uveče (trans. Show That Goes on Television on Mondays Around 9 p.m.) also known as Booksovci was a sketch comedy that was broadcast on RTCG during 2004. The show is a work of The Books of Knjige, a comedy group and alternative rock band from Cetinje. It had ten episodes, each lasting 30 minutes. The show was a big success in Montenegro and had a large audience. The style of the show was partially influenced by Monty Python's Flying Circus and Bosnian Top Lista Nadrealista.

== Plot ==
Every episode would start with an elderly gentleman who would start talking nonsense, combining things that could not be combined. He would start talking about something but he would always be talking about a completely different subject in the end.

After that, 3 separate sketches would follow.

== Sketches ==
Like Monty Python, their sketches were a surreal and comic, sometimes sarcastic view of living in their country. In their sketches, they made fun of policemen, habits of Montenegrin people, government, daily routine.
