= Slovenski Top Model season 1 =

Slovenski Top Model
- Season 1
- No. of episodes: 14

Release
- Original network: TV3
- Original release: September 22 – December 22, 2010

Slovenski Top Model, Season 1 was the first season of a reality documentary based on Tyra Banks America's Next Top Model that pits contestants from Slovenia against each other in a variety of competitions to determine who will win title of the next Slovene Top Model and a lucrative modelling contract with Alen Kobilica Models agency, a spread in the Slovenian issue of Elle, car Seat Ibiza, the winner will also become face of Maybeline New York for Slovenia, she will receive mobile package Orto Muziq for 2 years and hopes of a successful future in the modeling business.

The first season was hosted by Slovene model Nuša Šenk. Judging panelists were Irena Lušičić, Milan Gačanovič, Petra Windschnurer, Zoran. Girls were allowed to audition between the ages of 16 and 27 and have to be taller than 170 cm (5 ft 7 in). Auditions have been held in the seven biggest cities of Slovenia (Maribor, Ljubljana, Kranj, Celje, Novo Mesto, Nova Gorica, and Koper).

On December 22, 16-year-old Maja Fučak from Koper was crowned the first winner of Slovenski Top Model over 22 year old Tina Grebenšek after both walked on a fashion show in Belgrade. Despite landing in the bottom two at the very first judging, Fučak beat 13 of her fellow competitors.

== Contestants ==
Contestant	Age	Height	Hometown	Finish	Place
Aleksandra Kastrevc	20	1.73 m (5 ft 8 in)	Novo Mesto	Episode 2	14
Lejla Šabić	16	1.79 m (5 ft 10 1/2 in)	Hrvatini	Episode 3	13 (quit)
Senta Margan	20	1.78 m (5 ft 10 in)	Maribor	Episode 4	12
Maja Bulog	19	1.77 m (5 ft 9 1/2 in)	Ljubljana	Episode 5	11
Samanta Škrjanec	21	1.69 m (5 ft 6 1/2 in)	Radomlje	Episode 6	10
Kamila Perko	21	1.81 m (5 ft 11 1/2 in)	Brestanica	Episode 7	9 (quit)
Ana Rant	20	1.81 m (5 ft 11 1/2 in)	Škofja Loka	Episode 8	8
Nika Matavž	16	1.74 m (5 ft 8 1/2 in)	Slovenj Gradec	Episode 10	7–6
Nika Mihelčič	20	1.80 m (5 ft 11 in)	Ljubljana	Episode 10	7–6
Sara Ana Pelko	22	1.72 m (5 ft 7 1/2 in)	Ljubljana	Episode 11	5
Martina Cifer	22	1.71 m (5 ft 7 1/2 in)	Grosuplje	Episode 12	4
Lea Bernetič	16	1.68 m (5 ft 6 in)	Skopo	Episode 13	3
Tina Grebenšek	22	1.80 m (5 ft 11 in)	Velenje	Episode 14	2
Maja Fučak	16	1.72 m (5 ft 7 1/2 in)	Koper	Episode 14	1

== Summaries ==
=== Call-out order ===
Nuša's call-out order
Order	Episodes													
Order	1	2	3	4	5	6	7	8	9	10	11	12	13	14
1	Ana	Kamila	Kamila	Lea	Lea	Lea	Tina	Maja F.	Maja F.	Maja F.	Tina	Maja F.	Tina	Maja F.
2	Senta	Lea	Ana	Tina	Samanta	Tina	Lea	Tina	Tina	Tina	Lea	Lea	Maja F.	Tina
3	Sara Ana	Martina	Martina	Samanta	Ana	Maja F.	Martina	Martina	Sara Ana	Lea	Maja F.	Tina	Lea	
4	Martina	Senta	Nika Mi.	Nika Mi.	Maja F.	Sara Ana	Maja F.	Lea	Lea	Martina	Martina	Martina		
5	Lejla	Nika Mi.	Maja F.	Kamila	Nika Ma.	Nika Ma.	Sara Ana	Nika Mi.	Nika Ma.	Sara Ana	Sara Ana			
6	Maja B.	Ana	Sara Ana	Martina	Martina	Nika Mi.	Nika Mi.	Nika Ma.	Martina	Nika Ma. Nika Mi.				
7	Tina	Tina	Lea	Maja B.	Nika Mi.	Kamila	Nika Ma.	Sara Ana	Nika Mi.	Nika Ma. Nika Mi.				
8	Nika Ma.	Maja B.	Samanta	Nika Ma.	Kamila	Ana	Ana	Ana						
9	Maja F.	Lejla	Tina	Maja F.	Sara Ana	Martina	Kamila							
10	Nika Mi.	Nika Ma.	Nika Ma.	Ana	Tina	Samanta								
11	Kamila	Samanta	Senta	Sara Ana	Maja B.									
12	Aleksandra	Sara Ana	Maja B.	Senta										
13	Lea	Maja F.	Lejla											
14	Samanta	Aleksandra												

The contestant was eliminated
The contestant quit the competition
The contestant was the original eliminee but was saved
The contestant was part of a non-elimination bottom two
The contestant won the competition

- In episode 1, the pool of 22 girls was reduced to the final 14 who would move on to the main competition. This first call-out does not reflect their performance.
- In episode 3, Lejla quit the competition. Therefore, there was no elimination that episode.
- In episode 7, Kamila quit the competition. Therefore, there was no elimination that episode.

=== Photo Shoot Guide ===
- Episode 1 photo shoot: Swimwear (casting)
- Episode 2 photo shoot: Fairies in mountains
- Episode 3 photo shoot: Maybelline beauty shoot
- Episode 4 photo shoot: Naked in golden water
- Episode 5 photo shoot: Hollywood divas
- Episode 6 photo shoot: Futuristic underwater
- Episode 7 photo shoot: Orto babes for Simobil
- Episode 8 photo shoot: Protective sisters with babies
- Episode 9 photo shoot: High fashion with chairs and snakes in 3D
- Episode 10 photo shoot: Greek kiss for S.oliver
- Episode 11 photo shoot: Fishing village in Italy
- Episode 12 photo shoot: Lingerie
- Episode 13 photo shoot: A high fashion story editorial
- Episode 14 photo shoot: Elle cover shots

== Controversy ==
After being elimination from the show Samanta Škrjanec was accused of hosting a scam beauty pageant called Miss Eco by competitors as well as a scam modelling agency called Modna Agencija Samanta Š. It was also discovered that she was hosting an erotic quiz at the age of 19.
