= Survivor Srbija: Philippines =

- No. of days: 53
- No. of castaways: 22
- Winner: Aleksandar Krajišnik
- Location: Caramoan, Philippines
- No. of episodes: 53

Release
- Original release: October 19, 2009 – February 18, 2010

Additional information
- Filming dates: July 15 – September 5, 2009

Season chronology
- ← Previous; Survivor Srbija: Panama Next → Survivor Srbija VIP: Philippines

Survivor Srbija: Philippines is the second season of the Serbian version of the Survivor television series, created by Vision Team production company and broadcast by Fox televizija.

The second season of Survivor Srbija was an international co-production recorded on the Caramoan Peninsula in the Philippines during the summer of 2009, with 17 contestants from Serbia, two contestants from Macedonia, two contestants from Slovenia and one contestant from Bosnia and Herzegovina.

Featuring 22 contestants (11 men and 11 women), broadcast started on October 19, 2009 in Serbia, Macedonia, Bosnia and Herzegovina and Montenegro; and on October 21, 2009 in Slovenia.

The show was hosted by Andrija Milošević, as in the first season.

In addition to Serbia, the show was broadcast in Bosnia and Herzegovina (Alternativna Televizija and NTV Hayat), Macedonia (Sitel televizija), Montenegro (PRO TV) and Slovenia (TV3 Slovenia).

Because of different language Slovenian Broadcaster TV3 localized their broadcast, they were using subtitled Serbian Fox TV shows with addition of their own on-site co-host Ula Furlan stories about Philippines - Ula's Survivor.

Slovenian version also omitted word Srbija from show title - it is titled simply Survivor.

Aleksandar Krajišnik was named the winner in the final episode on February 18, 2010, defeating Teja Lapanja and Vesna Đolović with a vote of 6-3-1. He won a prize of €100.000.

In addition, Aleksandar Bošković was named "Public Favourite", earning the fans' vote over Nikola Kovačević, Srđan Dinčić and Aleksandar Krajišnik and he won a car, a Nissan Navara.

== Contestants ==
Contestant	Original tribe	First switch	Second switch	Merged tribe	Finish	Ghost Island	Total votes
Branka Čudanov; 28, Kikinda	Ga 'dang				2nd Voted Out; Day 7	1st Eliminated; Day 9	10
Gordana Berger; 38, Belgrade	Manobo				1st Voted Out; Day 4	2nd Eliminated; Day 12	9
Ana Mitrić; 23, Belgrade	Ga 'dang				3rd Voted Out; Day 10	3rd Eliminated; Day 15	7
Milena Vitanović; 21, Paraćin	Ga 'dang				4th Voted Out; Day 13	4th Eliminated; Day 18	8
Nikola Kovačević; Returned to game from Ghost Island^{6}	Ga 'dang				5th Voted Out; Day 16	Ghost Island Winner; Day 32	6
Branislava Bogdanović; 27, Kačarevo	Manobo				Eliminated in a twist^{1} Day 17	5th Eliminated; Day 18	2
Pece Kotevski; 42, Bitola	Ga 'dang	Manobo			6th Voted Out; Day 19	6th Eliminated; Day 21	7
Predrag Veljković; 29, Pekčanica, near Kraljevo	Ga 'dang	Manobo			Quit^{2} Day 22	7th Eliminated; Day 24	3
Anita Mažar; 23, Kula	Ga 'dang	Ga 'dang			Removed Due to Injury^{3} Day 24		1
Aleksandar Bošković; 28, Belgrade	Manobo	Manobo			7th Voted Out; Day 25	8th Eliminated; Day 27	4
Ana Stojanovska; 21, Skopje	Manobo	Manobo	Manobo		8th Voted Out; Day 28	9th Eliminated; Day 30	3^{5}
Luka Rajačić; 21, Belgrade	Ga 'dang	Manobo	Manobo		9th Voted Out; Day 31	10th Eliminated; Day 32	6
Nemanja Vučetić; 23, Novi Sad	Manobo	Ga 'dang	Ga 'dang	Diwata	10th Voted Out; 1st Jury Member; Day 35		7
Nikola Kovačević; 24, Kragujevac	Ga 'dang			Diwata	11th Voted Out; 2nd Jury Member; Day 38	Ghost Island Winner; Day 32	12
Dina Berić; 23, Ledinci, near Novi Sad	Manobo	Ga 'dang	Manobo^{4}	Diwata	12th Voted Out; 3rd Jury Member; Day 41		6
Višnja Banković; 24, Aranđelovac	Ga 'dang	Ga 'dang	Ga 'dang	Diwata	13th Voted Out; 4th Jury Member; Day 44		14
Klemen Rutar; 21, Ljubljana	Manobo	Ga 'dang	Ga 'dang	Diwata	14th Voted Out; 5th Jury Member; Day 47	Locator of Hidden Immunity Idol (Failed); Day 34	6
Srđan Dinčić; 25, Sremska Mitrovica	Manobo	Manobo	Ga 'dang	Diwata	15th Voted Out; 6th Jury Member; Day 50		7
Srđan Dinčić; 25, Sremska Mitrovica	Manobo	Manobo	Manobo^{4}	Diwata	15th Voted Out; 6th Jury Member; Day 50		7
Njegoš Arnautović; 21, Bijeljina	Manobo	Ga 'dang	Ga 'dang	Diwata	Eliminated in Challenge; 7th Jury Member; Day 53	Locator of Hidden Immunity Idol (Successful); Day 40	1
Dušan Milisavljević; 25, Zvečan	Manobo	Manobo	Manobo	Diwata	Eliminated in Challenge; 8th Jury Member; Day 53	Locator of Hidden Immunity Idol (Failed); Day 37	2
Vesna Đolović; 38, Beograd	Manobo	Manobo	Manobo	Diwata	2nd Runner-Up	Locator of Hidden Immunity Idol (Failed); Day 46	8
Teja Lapanja; 30, Škofja Loka	Ga 'dang	Ga 'dang	Ga 'dang	Diwata	Runner-Up	Locator of Hidden Immunity Idol (Failed); Day 49	1
Aleksandar Krajišnik; 19, Majur, near Šabac	Ga 'dang	Ga 'dang	Ga 'dang	Diwata	Sole Survivor	Locator of Hidden Immunity Idol (Failed); Day 43	0

Total votes is the number of votes a castaway has received during Tribal Councils where the castaway is eligible to be voted out of the game. It does not include the votes received during the final Tribal Council.

^1 Branislava was not chosen to continue, after neither of the swapped tribes had chosen her for a member (the rule was that the last unchosen contestant must be eliminated), and she went to Ghost Island. She wasn't voted out regularly at Tribal Council.

^2 Predrag said at Tribal Council that he wanted to leave the game, so he quit the game and there wasn't a vote.

^3 Anita hurt her leg during last immunity challenge and she had to leave the game.

^4 On day 26 Manobo and Ga 'dang had the opportunity to choose one person from the other tribe; Manobo chose Dina, Ga 'dang chose Srđan. On day 29 Dina and Srđan had the opportunity to return to their last tribe. Srđan returned to Manobo, but Dina objected to return to Ga 'dang, and she stayed on Manobo.

^5 Three additional votes were cast against Ana S. during a tie-breaker vote.

^6 Because Nikola is the winner on Ghost Island, he was brought back into the game on day 32, so he is listed as having placed in two different points in the game.

== The game ==
Cycles in this article refer to the three-day periods in the game (unless indicated), composed of at least the Immunity Challenge and the subsequent Tribal Council.

Cycle no.	Air dates	Challenges			Eliminated	Vote	Finish	Ghost Island				
Cycle no.	Air dates	Reward	Immunity	Special Challenge^{1}	Eliminated	Vote	Finish	Inhabitant	Face-off Challenger	Eliminated	Finish	Locator of Hidden Immunity Idol
01	October 19 to October 22, 2009	Ga 'dang	Ga 'dang	Klemen	Gordana	9-2	1st Voted Out; Day 4	None^{2}				
02	October 27 to October 29, 2009	Manobo	Manobo	~~Aleksandar K.~~ (Pedrag)^{3}	Branka	10-1	2nd Voted Out; Day 7	Gordana	None^{4}			None^{13}
03	November 3 to November 5, 2009	Ga 'dang	Manobo	~~Aleksandar K.~~ (Milena)^{5}	Ana M.	7-2-1	3rd Voted Out; Day 10	Gordana	Branka	Branka	1st Eliminated; Day 9	None^{13}
04	November 10 to November 12, 2009	Ga 'dang	Manobo	Pece	Milena	8-1	4th Voted Out; Day 13	Gordana	Ana M.	Gordana	2nd Eliminated; Day 12	None^{13}
05	November 24 to November 26, 2009	Ga 'dang	Manobo	Pece	Nikola	6-1-1	5th Voted Out; Day 16	Ana M.	Milena	Ana M.	3rd Eliminated; Day 15	None^{13}
06	December 1 to December 3, 2009	None^{6}	Ga 'dang	~~Srđan~~ (Vesna) ^{7}	Branislava	No vote	Eliminated in a twist Day 17	Milena	Nikola	Milena	4th Eliminated; Day 18	None^{13}
06	December 1 to December 3, 2009	None^{6}	Ga 'dang	~~Srđan~~ (Vesna) ^{7}	Pece	7-1	6th Voted Out; Day 19	Milena	Branislava	Branislava	5th Eliminated; Day 18	None^{13}
07	December 8 to December 10, 2009	Manobo	Ga 'dang	Srđan	Predrag	No vote	Quit; Day 22	Nikola	Pece	Pece	6th Eliminated; Day 21	None^{13}
08	December 15 to December 17, 2009	Ga 'dang	Ga 'dang	~~Luka~~ (Vesna)^{8}	Anita	No vote	Removed Due to Injury; Day 24	Nikola	Predrag	Predrag	7th Eliminated; Day 24	None^{13}
08	December 15 to December 17, 2009	Ga 'dang	Ga 'dang	~~Luka~~ (Vesna)^{8}	Aleksandar B.	4-1-1	7th Voted Out; Day 25	Nikola	Predrag	Predrag	7th Eliminated; Day 24	None^{13}
09	December 22 to December 24, 2009	Ga 'dang	Ga 'dang	~~Dušan~~ (Dina)^{9}	Ana S.	2-2-1/3	8th Voted Out; Day 28	Nikola	Aleksandar B.	Aleksandar B.	8th Eliminated; Day 27	None^{13}
10	December 29 to December 31, 2009	Ga 'dang	Ga 'dang	~~Dušan~~ (Vesna)^{10}	Luka	3-1-1	9th Voted Out; Day 31	Nikola	Ana S.	Ana S.	9th Eliminated; Day 30	None^{13}
11	January 5 to January 8, 2010	None^{11}	~~Aleksandar K.~~ (Teja)^{12}	Dina	Nemanja	7-4-1	10th Voted Out; 1st Jury Member; Day 35	Nikola	Luka	Luka	10th Eliminated; Day 32	Klemen
12	January 12 to January 14, 2010	Aleksandar K., Klemen, Njegoš, Srđan, Vesna	~~Srđan~~ (Dina)^{15}	Višnja	Nikola	6-1-1-1	11th Voted Out; 2nd Jury Member; Day 38	None^{14}				Dušan
13	January 19 to January 21, 2010	Dina, Dušan, Klemen, Njegoš	~~Aleksandar K.~~ (Njegoŝ)^{16}	Klemen	Dina	5-4-1	12th Voted Out; 3rd Jury Member; Day 41	None^{14}				Njegoš
14	January 26 to January 28, 2010	Aleksandar K., Srđan, Vesna, Višnja	Njegoš	Aleksandar K.	Višnja	4-3	13th Voted Out; 4th Jury Member; Day 44	None^{14}				Aleksandar K.
15	February 2 to February 4, 2010	Dušan, [Vesna]	Teja	Srđan	Klemen	4-3-1	14th Voted Out; 5th Jury Member; Day 47	None^{14}				Vesna
16	February 9 to February 11, 2010	Teja, [Aleksandar K.]	~~Njegoš~~ (Aleksandar K.)^{17}	Aleksandar K.	Srđan	5-0	15th Voted Out; 6th Jury Member; Day 50	None^{14}				Teja
17	February 16 to February 18, 2010	None^{18}		Teja	Njegoš	No vote	Eliminated in challenge 7th Jury Member; Day 53	None^{14}				None^{19}
17	February 16 to February 18, 2010	None^{18}		Vesna	Njegoš	No vote	Eliminated in challenge 7th Jury Member; Day 53	None^{14}				None^{19}
17	February 16 to February 18, 2010	None^{18}		Aleksandar K.	Dušan	No vote	Eliminated in challenge 8th Jury Member; Day 53	None^{14}				None^{19}
Final	February 18, 2010	Jury vote			Vesna	6-3-1	2nd Runner-up	None^{14}				None^{19}
Final	February 18, 2010	Jury vote			Teja	6-3-1	Runner-up	None^{14}				None^{19}
Final	February 18, 2010	Jury vote			Aleksandar K.	6-3-1	Sole Survivor	None^{14}				None^{19}

In the case of multiple tribes or castaways who win reward or immunity, they are listed in order of finish, or alphabetically where it was a team effort; where one castaway won and invited others, the invitees are in brackets.

^1 Through cycle 1 to 10 the challenge was an "Individual Immunity"; through cycle 11 to 16, in even weeks the challenge was a "Double Vote and Little Reward", and in odd weeks the challenge was a "Black Vote and Little Reward". At cycle 17 the challenge was "Place in the Final" where the remaining castaways compete in 3 final challenges for a place in the final.
^2 Ghost Island was not yet introduced.
^3 Aleksandar K. gave his immunity to Predrag.
^4 Ghost Island introduced; Gordana became first inhabitant.
^5 Aleksandar K. gave his immunity to Milena.
^6 There was no reward challenge because of the first switch.
^7 Srđan gave his immunity to Vesna.
^8 Luka gave his immunity to Vesna.
^9 Dušan gave his immunity to Dina.
^10 Dušan gave his immunity to Vesna.
^11 There was no reward challenge because of the merge.
^12 Aleksandar K. gave his immunity to Teja.
^13 Locator of Hidden Immunity Idol is active after merge.
^14 Challenges on Ghost Island are over, Nikola is the winner and he is back in the merged tribe. Only the Locator of Hidden Immunity Idol is active on Ghost Island.
^15 Srđan gave his immunity to Dina.
^16 Aleksandar K. gave his immunity to Njegoš.
^17 Njegoš gave his immunity to Aleksandar K.
^18 This challenges is not active at cycle 17.
^19 Locator of Hidden Immunity Idol on Ghost Island are over.

== Voting history ==
Tribal Council (TC) numbers are almost the same as Cycle numbers as a Tribal Council occurs at the end of each cycle; eliminations that happen outside a Tribal Council do not bear a Tribal Council number, but count towards a cycle. Episode numbers denote the episode(s) when the voting and subsequent revelation of votes and elimination during a Tribal Council took place. They can also denote the episode wherein a contestant officially left the game for any reason.

	Original tribes						First switch				Second switch		
TC #:	1	2	3	4	5	-	6	7	-	8	9		10
Episode #:	4	7	10	13	16	17	19	22	24	25	28		31
Eliminated:	Gordana; 9/11 votes	Branka; 10/11 votes	Ana M. 7/10 votes	Milena; 8/9 votes	Nikola; 6/8 votes	Branislava; No vote^{1}	Pece; 7/8 votes	Predrag; No vote^{2}	Anita; No vote^{3}	Aleksandar B. 4/6 votes	Tie^{4}	Ana S. 3/3 votes	Luka; 3/5 votes
Voter	Vote												
Aleksandar K.		Branka	Ana M.	Milena	Nikola								
Dina	Gordana										Vesna	Ana S.	Luka
Dušan	Gordana						Pece			Aleksandar B.	Vesna	Ana S.	Dušan^{6}
Klemen	Gordana												
Nemanja	Gordana												
Nikola		Branka	Ana M.	Milena	Luka								
Njegoš	Gordana												
Srđan	Gordana						Pece			Aleksandar B.			Luka
Teja		Branka	Ana M.	Milena	Nikola								
Vesna	Branislava						Pece			Aleksandar B.	Ana S.	None^{5}	Luka
Višnja		Branka	Ana M.	Milena	Nikola								
Luka		Branka	Ana M.	Milena	Anita		Pece			Ana S.	Ana S.	Ana S.	Dina
Ana S.	Gordana						Pece			Aleksandar B.	Luka	None^{5}	
Aleksandar B.	Gordana						Pece			Dušan			
Anita		Branka	Predrag	Milena	Nikola								
Predrag		Branka	Ana M.	Milena	Nikola		Pece						
Pece		Branka	Ana M.	Milena	Nikola		Luka						
Branislava	Gordana												
Milena		Branka	Predrag	Predrag									
Ana M.		Branka	Teja										
Branka		Višnja											
Gordana	Branislava												

	Merged Tribe							
TC #:	11	12	13	14	15	16	Challenge	
Episode #:	35	38	41	44	47	50	53	
Eliminated:	Nemanja; 7/12 votes	Nikola; 6/9 votes	Dina; 5/10 votes	Višnja; 4/7 votes	Klemen; 4/8 votes	Srđan; 5/5 votes	Njegoš; No vote	Dušan; No vote
Voter	Vote							
Aleksandar K.	Nemanja	Nikola	Dina	Višnja	Vesna	Srđan		
Teja	Nemanja	Nikola	Dina		Vesna	Srđan		
Vesna	Nemanja	Nikola	Višnja	Višnja	Klemen			
Dušan	Nemanja	Nikola	Višnja	Višnja	Klemen	Srđan		
Njegoš	Srđan	Klemen	Dina	Vesna	Vesna	Srđan		
Srđan	Nemanja	Njegoš	Višnja	Višnja	Klemen; Klemen	Srđan^{8}		
Klemen	Nemanja	Nikola	Dina; Klemen^{7}	Vesna	Srđan			
Višnja	Nemanja	Nikola	Dina	Vesna				
Dina	Višnja; Višnja		Višnja					
Nikola	Višnja	Višnja						
Nemanja	Višnja							

Jury vote
Finalist:	Vesna; 1/10 votes	Teja; 3/10 votes	Aleksandar K. 6/10 votes
Juror	Vote		
Public vote^{9}			Aleksandar K. Aleksandar K.
Dušan			Aleksandar K.
Njegoš			Aleksandar K.
Srđan			Aleksandar K.
Klemen		Teja	
Višnja		Teja	
Dina			Aleksandar K.
Nikola	Vesna		
Nemanja		Teja	

This castaway could not vote at Tribal Council, because s/he had the "Black Vote necklace".

^1 Branislava was eliminated irregularly, outside of Tribal Council. She was not chosen to join any of new swapped tribes, thus she was eliminated.

^2 Predrag said at Tribal Council that he wanted to leave the game, so he quit the game and there wasn't a vote.

^3 Anita was evacuated for medical reasons, therefore no vote occurred for her removal from the game.

^4 The first Tribal Council Vote resulted in a tie. Per the rules, a second vote was held where the castaways involved in the tie would not vote and the remaining castaways could only vote for the tied contestants.

^5 Ana S. and Vesna were not eligible to vote in the second Tribal Council vote. Ana S. was voted out after the first Tribal Council; vote resulted in a tie.

^6 Dušan decided to not vote in the Tribal Council, and as a punishment he received an extra vote.

^7 Klemen decided to not use double vote in the Tribal Council, and as a punishment he received an extra vote.

^8 Srđan decided to not vote in the Tribal Council, and as a punishment he received an extra vote.

^9 The public from Serbia and from region (Macedonia, Montenegro, Slovenia and Bosnia and Herzegovina) was allowed to award a jury vote to one of the finalists. Public gave two votes for Aleksandar K.
