= Nuša Šenk =

Nusa Senk (born 3 September 1981) is a Slovenian model, media personality, businesswoman and television host.

== Early life and discovery ==
Senk was born in Kranj, SFR Yugoslavia. She was discovered at the age of 12 by Slovenian scout in her home town. Senk was known to be shy but despite that she started travelling at her early age. In the next three years of schooling she started travelling with her mother beside her at all time, reaching fashion centres such as Milan, London and Barcelona receiving her first experience in modeling. Agents convinced her and her parents that she would have a good chance of having a successful career as a fashion model. At 15 she went to New York where she pursued a career in modeling. Since then she has been successful all over the world.

== Career ==
Modeling

Senk began her modeling career when she moved to New York at her age 15. She became a full-time model signing with. Since then Senk has enjoyed one of the most successful careers as a Slovenian fashion model. At the age of 15 she got her first campaign for Giorgio Armani Eyewear following various high-profile advertising campaigns including DKNY, Emporio Armani, Levi's, Ermenegildo Zegna, Marc O'Polo, Swarovski, Air France, KOOKAi, René Lazard, Anteprima and Hudson Jeans. She walked the catwalk for numerous high-end fashion shows such as Emillio Pucci, Emanuel Ungaro, Yigal Azrouel, Esteban Cortazar, Zac Posen, Vera Wang, Richard Tyler, Carolina Herrera and Issey Miyake at the fashion week capitals of the world: New York City, London, Milan and Paris.

Senk is the first Slovenian supermodel to appear in Vogue, the top fashion magazine in the world. She also appeared in L'Uomo Vogue photographed by Bruce Weber. She has worked with fashion photographers such as Richard Burbridge, Bruce Weber, Walter Chin, Terry Richardson, Philippe Cometti, Pamela Hanson, Alan Clarke, Tony Kim, Enrique Badulescu and Steven Clein. Senk has appeared on the covers and done several editorials of high-fashion magazines such as Vogue, L'Uomo Vogue, Elle, Arena, Soma magazine, Surface, Naylon, BlackBook, D Magazine, The Face, Tatler, Style Magazine, Glamour, i-D, Amica Italy and Harper's Bazaar.

TV

Nusa Senk is the host and lead judge of the Slovenian Top Model. It is the Slovenian version of the internationally successful reality television show originally created by Tyra Banks ˝America`s Next Top Model˝. The first "cycle" of Slovenian Top Model premiered September 22, 2010 on TV3 Slovenia.

Other appearances

In 2003 Senk appeared among Naomi Campbell in a music video of Jay-Z ˝Change clothes˝. In October 2007 she was chosen by a well known New York casting director Drew Linehan to appear in one of the most highly expected movie Sex and the City starring: Sarah Jessica Parker (Carrie Bradshaw), Kim Cattrall (Samantha Jones), Kristin Davis (Charlotte York), and Cynthia Nixon (Miranda Hobbes). Nuša is seen in the movie on the catwalk wearing Vivienne Westwood's purple dress and blue gloves.

Awards

In 2000, Senk was named by Tear Sheet's special issue to be one of the 50 most beautiful models in the world "Tear Sheet's 50 Most Beautiful Models". They choose male and female models from over one hundred agencies. In Slovenia she was awarded by TREND awards for the model of the year in 2003.
