= TV3 Slovenia =

- Country: Slovenia
- Broadcast area: Slovenia
- Headquarters: Ljubljana, Slovenia

Programming
- Language: Slovenian

Ownership
- Owner: Modern Times Group

History
- Launched: 24 December 1995 (first era); 1 October 2006 (second era)
- Closed: 1 November 2004 (first era); 29 February 2012 (second era)
- Replaced by: Pink SI

Links
- Website: www.tv3.si

TV3 was a television channel in Slovenia owned by Modern Times Group (MTG). The channel was eventually suspended on 1 November 2004, but it were later relaunched on 1 October 2006.

On 3 June 2008, TV3 began broadcasting in Slovenian digital terrestrial television network and it was disconnected on 1 September 2008.

== History ==
The station began as TV3 on 24 December 1995. Majority ownership was originally held by the Roman Catholic Church, and much of the initial programming was faith-oriented.

TV3 encountered poor ratings and financial losses from its outset. On 13 February 2003, Ivan Caleta, a businessman from Croatia, purchased 75% ownership of TV3 then proceeded to offer more popular programming. Viewership in 2004 increased but remained a distant fifth place behind other free-to-air television services in Slovenia.

On 1 November 2004, the channel was shut down and Prva TV began to use its frequencies. Later, on 1 July 2006, the channel was bought by Swedish media company Modern Times Group, and from 1 October 2006, the channel were relaunched, this time in reference to the Modern Times Group corporate brand TV3 Viasat.

On 29 February 2012, it ceased broadcasting due to uncompetitive environment and unresponsiveness of Slovenian authorities. It would become a new channel named Pink Si, now owned by Pink.

== Distribution ==
TV3 was distributed terrestrially and via third party cable TV, DTH and IPTV networks.

== Programming ==
=== Nationally created shows ===
Title	Format	Original show	Year
Survivor: Filipini	reality game show	Survivor	2009
Trenutek resnice	reality game show	Nada más que la verdad	2009-2010
Slovenski Topmodel	beauty reality show	Top Model	2010
Ljubezen na seniku	reality show	Farmer Wants a Wife	2011-2012
Riba na oko	cooking show	Hal a tortán	2010
Kdo je kuhar?	cooking show	/	2009
Družinski dvoboj	game show	Family Feud	2007-2008
Vse ali nič	game show	Divided	2009
VIP magazin	tabloid news show	/	2010-2012

=== Internationally Created Series ===
Original title	Slovenian title	Country
NCIS	Preiskovalci na delu: NCIS	USA
NCIS: Los Angeles	Preiskovalci na delu: NCIS L.A.	USA
The Walking Dead	Obkrožen z mrtvimi	USA
Melrose Place	Melrose Place	USA
Leverage	Zadoščenje	USA
Dollhouse	Hiša lutk	USA
Lie to Me	Laži mi	USA
Smallville	Smallville	USA
Battlestar Galactica	Bojna ladja Galaktika	USA
The Office	Pisarna	USA
Glee	Glee	USA
24	24	USA
JAG	JAG	USA
Murder She Wrote	Umor je napisala	USA
White Collar	Beli ovratnik	USA
Hawaii Five-0	Havaji 5.0	USA
Heroes	Heroji	USA
True Blood	Prava kri	USA
Supernatural	Nadnaravno	USA
FlashForward	FlashForward	USA

=== Internationally Created Animated Series ===
Original title	Slovenian title	Country	Year
SpongeBob SquarePants	Spuži Kvadratnik	USA	2006-2009
Jimmy Neutron	Jimmy Neutron	USA	2006-2009
Avatar: The Last Airbender	Avatar	USA	2008-2010

Little Einsteins (as a Voice-over)

Slovene title: Mali Ajnštajn

Country of origin: USA

Aired:

Sometime in 2000s-2010s

[Unverified]
