= The Books of Knjige =

- Notable work: The Books of Knjige (radio show); Various TV shows; The Cases of Justice (film); Moja Domovina (music album)

Comedy career
- Years active: 1993-present
- Medium: Television, Radio, Music
- Genres: Sketch comedy, surreal humour, political satire, parody
- Subjects: Politics, social issues, Montenegrin mentality, pop culture.
- Members: Aleksandar Radunović Popaj; Veselin Gajović Gajo; Goran Vujović; Zoran Marković Zonjo

The Books of Knjige is the Montenegrin comedy troupe and alternative rock band from Cetinje, also known as TBOK, Booksovci or Buksovci. It consists of four members: Popaj (Aleksandar Radunović), Goran (Goran Vujović), Gajo (Veselin Gajović) and Zonjo (Zoran Marković). They have made numerous TV comedy shows, an alternative rock album and host a weekly radio show on Radio Antena M. Their name, "The Books of Knjige" is an absurd for itself, since knjige means books in Serbo-Croatian. They are also registered as an NGO in Montenegro.

== Early life ==
Members of this troupe grew up as close friends in Cetinje, Montenegro. They have been known in the city for their frequent practical jokes and amateur comedy shows, which started their popularity. They have also hosted series of humorous shows on local Radio Cetinje.

== Film ==
In 2016, The Books of Knjige recorded their first feature parody mystery film titled "Cases of Justice" (Slučajevi pravde), which was aired in August 2017. The project was initially conceived as a TV series, but the change of plans took place after Prva TV withdrew the funding after the pilot episode aired in 2012.

== Music ==
The Books of Knjige have published only one official album, "Moja Domovina" ("My Homeland") in 2000. It was released by "Balkan Productions". Its first single, "Moja Domovina", was temporarily blocked on RTCG for its allegedly controversial content. Their genre is alternative rock, with predominantly humorous lyrics.

Also, in 2006 they have recorded a single "Bjež'te drogaši" ("Go Away, You Druggies") as a part of the Montenegrin Government's anti-drug campaign. They also recorded a duet with Edo Maajka in 2007, titled "Ja suludan neću biti" ("I Won't Be Crazy").

=== Moja Domovina (2000) ===
"Moja Domovina" album cover

1. "Intro (skit)"
2. "Đaoli me znali"
3. "Kao da cvijeće umije da pleše"
4. "Moja domovina"
5. "Smoki"
6. "Da je šćelo bit da bude moglo je bit"
7. "Džuli"
8. "Neka si pošla"
9. "Sanjam da te znam"
10. "Smoki II"
11. "Gumena pjesma"
12. "Džeko"
13. "Still Got the Blues (Kako mi je...)"
- Before each song there is a short comical skit as its intro, recorded as a separate track.

== Radio ==
The Books of Knige have hosted a radio show for a while on local Radio Cetinje, mostly consisting of previously prepared skits on current topics. In 1998, they have signed a contract with Radio Antena M, and are doing a weekly Friday night show on that radio station.

The show is simply called "The Books of Knjige" and is on air live every Friday night, at midnight. It lasts for two hours. Popaj, Gajo and Goran are the show hosts, while fourth member, Zonjo, is a producer and DJ. The show is usually composed from three parts. The first one is a humorous talk about current events, with a satirical retrospect to last week's current events. The second part usually consists of talking with two guests, and making fun of them mercilessly. The guests are either popular singers, film directors and other famous people from Balkans or people with very bizarre occupations, hobbies or sexual preferences. The third, last part of the show is usually a series of skits, or simply a free talk about topics the hosts feel like talking about.

== Television ==
The Books of Knjige have recorded multiple TV comedy shows, broadcast on Montenegrin TV channels, RTCG and IN TV. Their shows are a mix of satire and paradox, often compared to the works of Monty Python and Top Lista Nadrealista.

List of TV shows:

- TBOK Top Volley (parody on a popular TV lottery)
- Agrosaznanje 1 (parody on an RTCG agriculture show, part 1)
- Agrosaznanje 2 (parody on an RTCG agriculture show, part 2)
- "O Porijeklu Crnogoraca" ("About the Montenegrins' Ancestry")
- "Emisija Koja Ide na Televiziju Poneđeljkom oko 9 uveče" ("Show That Goes on Television on Mondays Around 9 p.m.")
- Novogodišnji Kalendar ("New Year Calendar")
- Novogodisnji Program (parody on several TV shows)

== See also ==
- Radio Antena M
