= Srpski Top Model =

- Genre: Reality television Modeling Competition
- Created by: Tyra Banks
- Presented by: Ivana Stanković
- Judges: Ivana Stanković; Miša Obradović; Nenad Radujević
- Theme music composer: Phillip Lawrence; Ari Levine; Bruno Mars; Fred Fairbrass; Richard Fairbrass; Rob Manzoli
- Opening theme: "Get Sexy"
- Country of origin: Serbia
- No. of episodes: 13

Production
- Running time: 75 minutes

Original release
- Network: Prva
- Release: March 16 – August 24, 2011

Srpski Top Model (English: Serbia's Top Model) is a Serbian reality documentary television show based on Tyra Banks' America's Next Top Model, and was aired on Prva. The show pits contestants against each other in a variety of competitions to determine who will win the title of the next Serbian "Top Model".

Serbian top model Ivana Stanković equaled the role of Tyra Banks in the original series as the head of the search as well as a mentor for the 15 girls who were chosen to live in a house together in Belgrade. Together with the panel of judges which included photographer Miša Obradović and fashion expert Nenad Radujević she evaluated the girls in a weekly judging session following eliminations until only three of them are left.

Season one started airing on March 16, 2011 and finished on June 6. Eighteen-year-old Neda Stojanović from Raška won over Bojana Banjac and Milica Đorđević. During the show Stojanović was spotted by a French modelling scout backstage at Belgrade Fashion Week. As reward for her victory she won a 2-years modeling contract with Click Fashion Agency, appear on the magazine cover of Grazia and an all-expenses trip to Israel.

== Cycles ==
Cycle	Premiere date	Winner	Runner-up	Other contestants in order of elimination	Number of contestants	International Destinations
1	16 March 2011	Neda Stojanović	Bojana Banjac	Jelena Jokić, Milica Paravina, Jelena Petrović, Tamara Vidić (quit), Anamari Ćulafić, Tijana Bajin, Marina Žikić, Nera Paštor, Dejana Živković, Kristina Marković, Ana Minkić & Katarina Kojadinović, Milica Đorđević	15	Zagreb; Berlin; Budva
