= Survivor Srbija: Panama =

- No. of days: 53
- No. of castaways: 22
- Winner: Nemanja Pavlov
- Location: Pearl Islands, Panama
- No. of episodes: 53

Release
- Original release: October 27, 2008 – February 18, 2009

Additional information
- Filming dates: July 31 – September 21, 2008

Season chronology
- Next → Survivor Srbija: Philippines

Survivor Srbija: Panama is a Serbian version of the Survivor television series, created and broadcast by Fox televizija. In addition to Serbia, the show was broadcast in Bosnia and Herzegovina on Alternativna televizija, Macedonia on A1 televizija and Montenegro on TV In.

Featuring 22 contestants (11 men and 11 women), its first season was broadcast starting on October 27, 2008. The show is hosted by Andrija Milošević. The shooting and the competition started on Thursday, July 31, 2008, on location in Panama (Pearl Islands archipelago, 80 km southeast of Panama City).

On October 1, 2008, the filming crew along with the contestants returned to Belgrade after successfully shooting the material. The show's broadcasts started in late October 2008, and finished in mid-February 2009. The show's primetime live televised finale on Wednesday, February 18, 2009, achieved record viewership in Serbia with 2.2 million tuning in (also FOX's record).

Nemanja Pavlov was named the winner in the final episode on February 18, 2009, defeating Radoslav Vidojević and Edita Janečka with a vote of 6–3–0; he won a prize of €100,000 and a Nissan Patrol.

In addition, Nemanja Rosić was named "Public Favourite", earning the fans' vote over Dario Ćirić and Ognjen Janevski. He won a prize of €10,000.

== Contestants ==
Contestant	Original tribe	Swapped tribe	Merged tribe	Finish	Total votes
Miodrag Jovanović; 55, Belgrade	None			1st eliminated^{1} Day 1	0
Slobodanka Tošić; 22, Han Pijesak, Republika Srpska	None			2nd eliminated^{2} Day 2	0
Bojana Lukić-Jovković; 41, Belgrade	Armada			1st voted out Day 4	7
Tamara Jovičić; 33, Čačak	Roca			2nd voted out Day 7	7
Miloš Todorović; 46, Lazarevac	Roca			3rd voted out Day 10	8
Saša Ljuboja; 34, Belgrade	Armada			4th voted out Day 13	9
Ognjen Janevski; 24, Valjevo	Roca			5th voted out Day 16	6
Marija Grubač; 25, Herceg Novi	Roca			6th voted out Day 19	4
Petar Obradović; 32, Belgrade	Roca			7th voted out Day 22	7
Tatjana Vesnić; 20, Belgrade	Armada	Armada		8th voted out Day 25	6
Vanja Jelača; 25, Novi Sad	Roca	Roca		9th voted out Day 28	10
Dario Ćirić; 31, Belgrade	Roca	Roca	Perla	10th voted out 1st Jury Member; Day 32	7
Nemanja Rosić; 20, Belgrade	Roca	Roca	Perla	11th voted out 2nd Jury Member; Day 35	10
Vanja Mandić; 29, Novi Sad	Roca	Roca	Perla	Left due to illness^{4} 3rd Jury Member; Day 37	1
Maja Lazarević; 26, Belgrade	Roca	Armada	Perla	12th voted out 4th Jury Member; Day 41	15
Maja Lazarević; 26, Belgrade	Roca	Roca^{3}	Perla	12th voted out 4th Jury Member; Day 41	15
Miloš Bugarčić; 32, Belgrade	Armada	Armada	Perla	13th voted out 5th Jury Member; Day 44	6
Vanja Radović; 32, Zemun	Armada	Armada	Perla	14th voted out 6th Jury Member; Day 47	8^{5}
Duško Nožinić; 29, Sisak/Jagodina	Armada	Armada	Perla	15th voted out 7th Jury Member; Day 50	7
Hana Stamatović; 26, Belgrade	Armada	Armada	Perla	Eliminated in challenge 8th Jury Member; Day 53	2
Edita Janečka; 27, Zrenjanin	Armada	Roca	Perla	2nd Runner-up	0
Edita Janečka; 27, Zrenjanin	Armada	Armada^{3}	Perla	2nd Runner-up	0
Radoslav Vidojević; 31, Pale/Belgrade	Armada	Armada	Perla	Runner-up	9
Nemanja Pavlov; 29, Valjevo/Novi Sad	Armada	Armada	Perla	Sole Survivor	4

The total votes is the number of votes a castaway has received during Tribal Councils where the castaway is eligible to be voted out of the game. It does not include the votes received during the final Tribal Council.

^1Two players were eliminated in a tribal selection process. The contestants are told that there were twenty immunity necklaces on the beach; the last two contestants without a necklace would be in danger. Miodrag and Slobodanka were the last contestants, but they had a second chance. The last immunity necklace was in the sea, forcing them to swim for it. They had the opportunity to choose one contestant who would swim instead of them. Slobodanka chose Ognjen, but Miodrag wanted to swim alone. Ognjen won and Miodrag was the first eliminated castaway.

^2On day 2, the castaways were told they would divide into two tribes of ten members each (five men and five women). Because there were 11 women, one of them would not be chosen, and she would be the second person eliminated. Slobodanka and Tamara were the last unchosen contestants, so Petar had to choose one of them. He chose Tamara, so Slobodanka was the second eliminated castaway.

^3On day 23, Roca and Armada had the opportunity to choose one woman from the other tribe; Roca chose Edita, and Armada chose Maja. On day 26 Maja and Edita had the opportunity to return to their first tribe. Maja returned to Roca, and Edita returned to Armada.

^4 Vanja M. experienced an attack of malaria during the last tribal council and she had to leave the game.

^5 Because Vanja R. played the hidden immunity idol, two votes against her did not count.

== The game ==
Cycles in this article refer to the three-day periods in the game (unless indicated), composed of at least the Immunity Challenge and the subsequent Tribal Council.

Cycle no.	Air dates	Challenges			Eliminated	Vote	Finish	Challenge for Hidden Immunity Idol
Cycle no.	Air dates	Reward	Immunity	Special Challenge^{1}	Eliminated	Vote	Finish	Challenge for Hidden Immunity Idol
01	October 27 to October 30, 2008	Roca^{2}		~~Miloš B.~~ (Edita)^{3}	Miodrag	No vote	1st Eliminated; Day 1	None^{8}
01	October 27 to October 30, 2008	Roca^{2}		~~Miloš B.~~ (Edita)^{3}	Slobodanka	No vote	2nd Eliminated; Day 2	None^{8}
01	October 27 to October 30, 2008	Roca^{2}		~~Miloš B.~~ (Edita)^{3}	Bojana	7-3	1st voted out Day 4	None^{8}
02	November 3 to November 5, 2008	Roca	Armada	Maja	Tamara	7-3	2nd voted out Day 7	None^{8}
03	November 10 to November 12, 2008	Roca	Armada	~~Miloš T.~~ (Vanja J.)^{4}	Miloš T.	8-1	3rd voted out Day 10	None^{8}
04	November 17 to November 19, 2008	Roca	Roca	Radoslav	Saša	6-3	4th voted out Day 13	None^{8}
05	November 24 to November 26, 2008	Roca	Armada	Nemanja R.	Ognjen	5-3	5th voted out Day 16	None^{8}
06	December 1 to December 3, 2008	Roca	Armada	~~Nemanja R.~~ (Maja)^{5}	Marija	4-2-1	6th voted out Day 19	None^{8}
07	December 8 to December 10, 2008	Roca	Armada	Dario	Patar	4-2	7th voted out Day 22	None^{8}
08	December 15 to December 17, 2008	Armada	Roca	Miloš B.	Tatjana	6-1-1	8th voted out Day 25	None^{8}
09	December 22 to December 24, 2008	Armada	Armada	Dario	Vanja J.	4-1	9th voted out Day 28	None^{8}
10	December 29, 2008 to January 1, 2009	None^{6}	Nemanja R.	Nemanja R., [Vanja M.]	Dario	7-5	10th voted out 1st Jury Member; Day 32	None^{8}
11	January 5 to January 7, 2009	Duško	Duško	Miloš B.	Nemanja R.	8-3	11th voted out 2nd Jury Member; Day 35	None^{8}
12	January 12 to January 14, 2009	Edita, [Vanja R.]	~~Hana~~ (Duško)^{7}	Edita, [Duško]	Vanja M.	No vote	Left Due to Illness; 3rd Jury Member day 37	None^{8}
12	January 12 to January 14, 2009	Edita, [Vanja R.]	~~Hana~~ (Duško)^{7}	Edita, [Duško]	Maja	8-1	None	None^{8}
13	January 19 to January 21, 2009	Radoslav, [Miloš B.]	Miloš B.	Vanja R.	Maja	7-2-1	12th voted out 4th Jury Member; Day 41	None^{8}
14	January 26 to January 28, 2009	Survivor; Auction	Nemanja P.	Miloš B., [Vanja R.]	Miloš B.	5-0	13th voted out 5th Jury Member; Day 44	Vanja R. (Successful); Day 42
15	February 2 to February 4, 2009	Nemanja P., [Edita]	Radoslav	Radoslav	Vanja R.	4-2-1	14th voted out 6th Jury Member; Day 47	Vanja R. (Failed); Day 46
16	February 9 to February 11, 2009	Radoslav, [Hana]	Radoslav	Edita	Duško	4-2	15th voted out 7th Jury Member; Day 50	Nemanja P. (Failed); Day 49
17	February 16 to February 18, 2009	None^{9}		Radoslav	Hana	No vote	Eliminated in challenge 8th Jury Member; Day 53	None^{10}
17	February 16 to February 18, 2009	None^{9}		Nemanja P.	Hana	No vote	Eliminated in challenge 8th Jury Member; Day 53	None^{10}
17	February 16 to February 18, 2009	None^{9}		Edita	Hana	No vote	Eliminated in challenge 8th Jury Member; Day 53	None^{10}
Final	February 18, 2009	Jury vote			Edita	6–3–0	2nd Runner-up	None^{10}
Final	February 18, 2009	Jury vote			Radoslav	6–3–0	Runner-up	None^{10}
Final	February 18, 2009	Jury vote			Nemanja P.	6–3–0	Sole Survivor	None^{10}

In the case of multiple tribes or castaways who win reward or immunity, they are listed in order of finish, or alphabetically where it was a team effort. Where one castaway won and invited others, the invitees are in brackets.

^1 Through cycle 1 to 9 the challenge was an "Individual Immunity"; through cycle 10 to 16 the challenge was a "Double Vote and Little Reward" and at cycle 17 the challenge was "Place in the Final", where the remaining castaway compete in three final challenges for a place in the final.
^2 Combined Reward and Immunity Challenges.
^3 Miloš B. gave his immunity to Edita.
^4 Miloš T. gave his immunity to Vanja J.
^5 Nemanja R. gave his immunity to Maja.
^6 There was no reward challenge because of the merge.
^7 Hana gave her immunity to Duško.
^8 The challenge for Hidden Immunity Idol is active when merged tribe has seven remain castaways from the former Armada tribe.
^9 This challenge is not active at cycle 17.
^10 Challenges for Hidden Immunity Idol are over.

== Voting history ==
Tribal Council (TC) numbers are almost the same as Cycle numbers as a Tribal Council occurs at the end of each cycle; eliminations that happen outside of a Tribal Council do not bear a Tribal Council number, but count towards a cycle. Episode numbers denote the episode(s) when the voting and subsequent revelation of votes and elimination during a Tribal Council took place. They can also denote the episode wherein a contestant officially left the game for any reason.

	Tribe selection		Original tribes							Swapped tribes	
TC #:	-		1	2	3	4	5	6	7	8	9
Episode #:	1	2	4	7	10	13	16	19	22	25	28
Eliminated:	Miodrag; No vote^{1}	Slobodanka; No vote^{2}	Bojana; 7/10 votes	Tamara; 7/10 votes	Miloš T. 8/9 votes	Saša; 6/9 votes	Ognjen; 5/8 votes	Marija; 4/7 votes	Petar; 4/6 votes	Tatjana; 6/8 votes	Vanja J. 4/5 votes
Voter	Vote										
Dario				Tamara	Miloš T.		Ognjen	Marija	Petar		Vanja J.
Duško			Saša			Saša				Tatjana	
Edita			Bojana			Saša					
Hana			Bojana			Saša				Tatjana	
Maja				Tamara	Miloš T.		Petar	Marija	Petar	Tatjana	Vanja J.
Miloš B.			Saša			Saša				Tatjana	
Nemanja P.			Bojana			Vanja R.				Hana	
Nemanja R.				Tamara	Miloš T.		Petar	Marija	Petar		Vanja J.
Radoslav			Bojana			Saša				Tatjana	
Vanja M.				Vanja J.	Miloš T.		Ognjen	Nemanja R.	Vanja J.		Vanja J.
Vanja R.			Bojana			Saša				Tatjana	
Vanja J.				Tamara	Miloš T.		Ognjen	Marija	Petar		Vanja M.
Tatjana			Bojana			Vanja R.				Duško	
Petar				Tamara	Miloš T.		Ognjen	Vanja J.	Vanja J.		
Marija				Vanja J.	Miloš T.		Ognjen	Nemanja R.			
Ognjen				Tamara	Miloš T.		Petar				
Saša			Bojana			Vanja R.					
Miloš T.				Tamara	Ognjen						
Tamara				Vanja J.							
Bojana			Saša								
Slobodanka											
Miodrag											

	Merged Tribe								
TC #:	10	11	-	12	13	14	15	16	Challenge
Episode #:	32	35	37	38	41	44	47	50	53
Eliminated:	Dario; 7/12 votes	Nemanja R. 8/11 votes	Vanja M. No vote^{3}	Maja; 8/9 votes^{4}	Maja; 7/10 votes^{5}	Miloš B. 6/6 votes	Vanja R. 4/7 votes	Duško; 4/6 votes	Hana; No vote
Voter	Vote								
Nemanja P.	Dario	Nemanja R.		Maja	Vanja R.	Miloš B.	Duško	Duško	
Radoslav	Dario	Nemanja R.		Maja	Maja	Miloš B.	Vanja R. Vanja R.	Duško	
Edita	Dario	Nemanja R.		Maja; Maja	Maja	Miloš B.	Vanja R.	Duško; Duško	
Hana	Dario	Nemanja R.		Maja	Maja	Miloš B.	Hana^{6}	Nemanja P.	
Duško	Dario	Nemanja R.		Maja	Maja	Miloš B.	Vanja R.	Nemanja P.	
Vanja R.	Dario	Nemanja R.		Maja	Maja; Nemanja P.	Miloš B.	Duško		
Miloš B.	Dario	Nemanja R. Nemanja R.		Maja	Maja	~~Vanja R.~~; ~~Vanja R.~~			
Maja	Radoslav	Radoslav		Radoslav	Nemanja P.				
Vanja M.	Radoslav	Radoslav							
Nemanja R.	Radoslav; Radoslav	Radoslav							
Dario	Radoslav								

Jury vote
Finalist:	Edita; 0/9 votes	Radoslav; 3/9 votes	Nemanja P. 6/9 votes
Juror	Vote		
Public vote^{7}			Nemanja P.
Hana		Radoslav	
Duško		Radoslav	
Vanja R.			Nemanja P.
Miloš B.		Radoslav	
Maja			Nemanja P.
Vanja M.			Nemanja P.
Nemanja R.			Nemanja P.
Dario			Nemanja P.

^1 Miodrag was eliminated in a tribal selection process. He lost in the challenge for last immunity necklace, so there wasn't a vote.

^2 Slobodanka was eliminated irregularly, outside of a Tribal Council. She was not chosen to join any of the new tribes, and thus she was eliminated.

^3 Vanja M. was evacuated for medical reasons, and therefore no vote occurred for her removal from the game.

^4 Maja was voted out on day 38, but because Vanja M. left due to illness, the life (torch) of Vanja M. went to Maja.

^5 Maja was voted out in the last Tribal Council, but she had a second chance and as a punishment Maja received an extra vote.

^6 Hana decided to not vote in the Tribal Council, and as a punishment she received an extra vote.

^7 The public was allowed to award a jury vote to one of the finalists. The public gave one vote for Nemanja P.

== Controversy ==
Before it even started airing, the show aroused some controversy when certain press outlets in Serbia discovered that one of the contestants, 22-year-old Slobodanka "Boba" Tošić, was accused of being an accessory in the attempted murder of gangster Đorđe Ždrale, her ex-boyfriend, that took place on April 13, 2006, in East Sarajevo. Furthermore, information surfaced that there was an arrest warrant issued for her by the Republika Srpska police, which was the reason she moved to Serbia. Her arrest warrant has a central character (as opposed to the worldwide Interpol one), meaning that it is only in effect on the territory of Republika Srpska. The show's producers did not comment on the situation and she was allowed to remain on the show.

She added to the controversy by doing a spread for the Serbian edition of Playboy, which was included in the issue that coincided with the show's launch.

During the live broadcast of the finale, only ten minutes before the winner was announced, Radoslav Vidojević accused fellow finalist Nemanja Pavlov of buying votes from four members of the Tribal Council. Pavlov was announced as the winner regardless, and the following day it was announced that the producers were suing Vidojević for slander.
