= The Agency (2001 TV series) =

2001 American spy action series

- Genre: Action; Spy; Drama
- Created by: Michael Frost Beckner
- Starring: Beau Bridges; Ronny Cox; Gil Bellows; Rocky Carroll; Gloria Reuben; Paige Turco; David Clennon; Richard Speight Jr.; Jason O'Mara; Daniel Benzali; Will Patton
- Country of origin: United States
- Original language: English
- No. of seasons: 2
- No. of episodes: 44 (list of episodes)

Production
- Executive producers: Gail Katz; Wolfgang Petersen; Michael Frost Beckner; Shaun Cassidy
- Running time: 44 minutes
- Production companies: Radiant Television; Shaun Cassidy Productions (2002–2003) (season 2); Studios USA Television (2001–2002) (season 1); Universal Network Television (2002–2003) (season 2); CBS Productions

Original release
- Network: CBS
- Release: September 27, 2001 – May 17, 2003

The Agency is an American action-spy television series that followed the inner workings of the CIA. The series was aired on CBS from September 27, 2001, until May 17, 2003, lasting two seasons.

The series, which premiered soon after the 9/11 attacks, was created by Michael Frost Beckner and was executive produced by Beckner, Shaun Cassidy Productions, and Radiant Productions in association with Universal Network Television and CBS Productions. The program was allowed unprecedented access to the actual CIA headquarters, thanks to a partnership that began in 1996 when the CIA hired one of its veteran clandestine officers, Chase Brandon, to work directly with Hollywood studios and production companies to influence its public image.

== Premise ==
The series was controversial in its exploration of contemporary international affairs and its treatment of the ethical conflicts inherent in intelligence work. Beckner's pilot script, written in March 2001, posited a re-invented CIA tasked with a "War on Terror" after Osama bin Laden's Al Qaeda terrorist organization plots a lethal attack on the West. The pilot was to premiere at CIA headquarters on September 18, 2001, and set to air on CBS September 21, 2001. The actual 9/11 attacks convinced the network to hold the pilot and instead air a later episode. That first episode was broadcast later as the fifth episode of the first season.

In advance of the September 11 attacks, executive producer Wolfgang Petersen said that after World War II, the ideas of good and evil were no longer as clear: "Everywhere in the world, the C.I.A. is still involved in missions. It is sometimes difficult to tell who is on the right side and who is on the wrong side.''

It was one of three new series, including Alias, and 24, to highlight the CIA. All three premiered following the September 11 attacks. Alias and 24 were considered hits, but CBS cancelled The Agency after two seasons.

In its review of the series, the Los Angeles Times noted: "It's hard to remember a time in U.S. history when public attention was more sharply focused on issues of domestic security, civil liberties and the role of U.S. intelligence agencies. A prime-time dramatic series on the CIA could contribute mightily to public understanding--if rigorously independent and unencumbered. Unfortunately, that's not the approach CBS is taking with The Agency..."

== Cast ==
- Gil Bellows – Agent, Matt Callan (season 1)
- Daniel Benzali – former DCI, interim DCI, and finally Liaison to Homeland Security, Robert Quinn
- Beau Bridges – Senator and later DCI, Tom Gage
- Rocky Carroll – Executive Assistant to the DCI, Carl Reese
- David Clennon – Chief of the Graphic Arts Division, Joshua Nankin
- Ronny Cox – DCI, Alex Pierce (season 1)
- Jason O'Mara – Agent, A.B. Stiles (season 2)
- Will Patton – Jackson Haisley
- Gloria Reuben – Agent, Lisa Fabrizzi (season 1)
- Richard Speight, Jr. – Information Technology Division officer, Lex
- Paige Turco – Graphic Arts Division officer, Terri Lowell

DCI refers to Director of Central Intelligence.

== Episodes ==
| Season | Episodes | Originally released | |
| Season | Episodes | First released | Last released |
|---|---|---|---|
| 1 | 22 | September 27, 2001 | May 9, 2002 |
| 2 | 22 | September 28, 2002 | May 17, 2003 |

== Home media ==
| DVD name | Region 1 | Region 2 |
|---|---|---|
| The Agency (2 Episodes from Season 1) | N/A | October 4, 2004 |
