= Zoran Kesić =

Serbian television presenter (born 1976)

Zoran Kesić Зоран Кесић
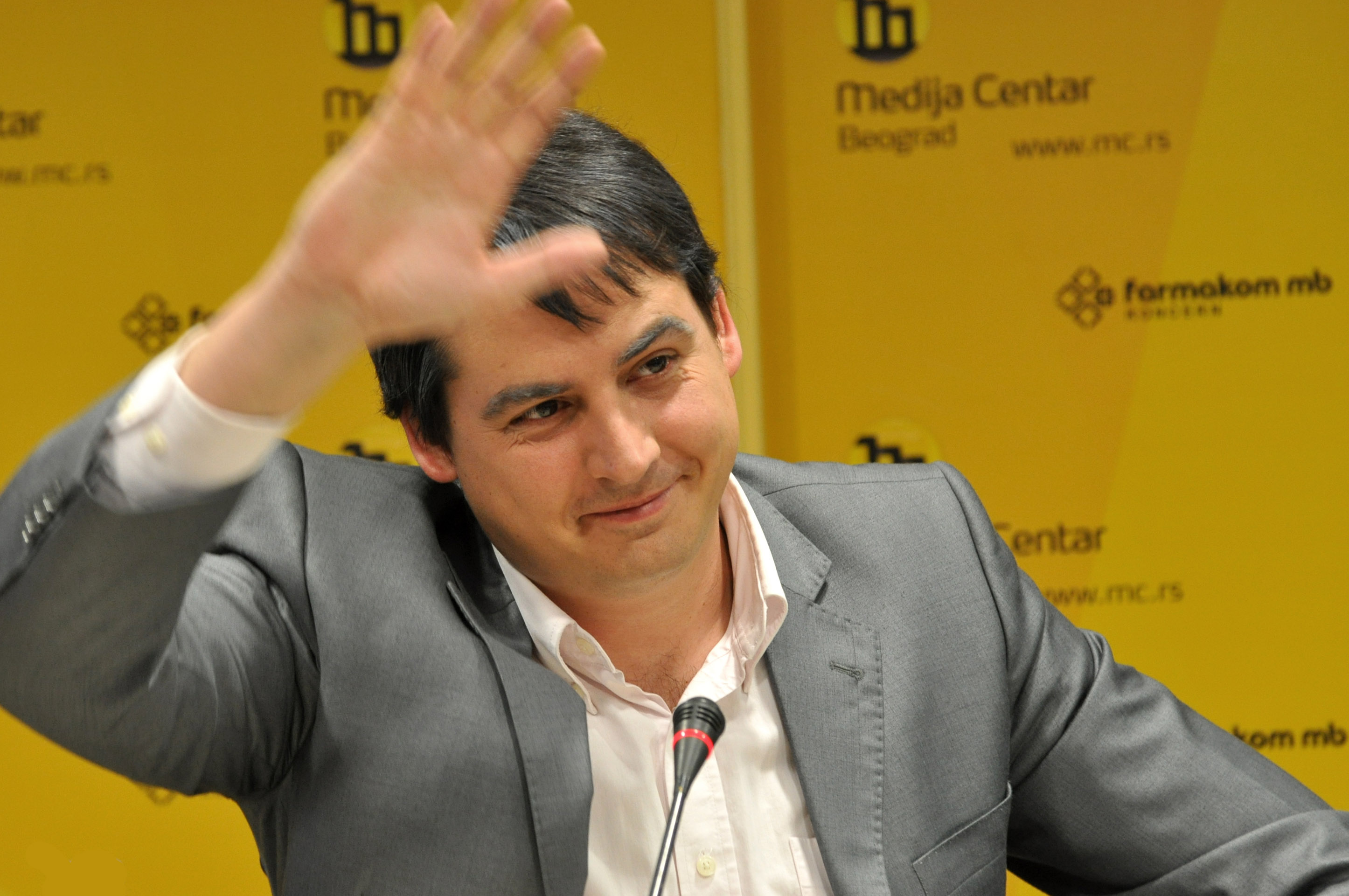
- Kesić in May 2012.
- Born: 26 July 1976 (age 50); Belgrade, SR Serbia, Yugoslavia
- Occupations: Television presenter, humorist
- Spouse: Ivana Majstorović-Kesić
- Children: 2

Zoran Kesić (Serbian Cyrillic: Зоран Кесић; born 26 July 1976) is a Serbian comedian, TV presenter, talk-show host and political commentator. He has worked on talk/sketch shows Fajront Republika (The Closing-Time Republic) and 24 minuta sa Zoranom Kesićem (24 minutes with Zoran Kesić).

== Biography ==
Kesić started his broadcasting career in 1994 as a reporter for Studio B's morning program Beograde, dobro jutro.

In 2000 he moved to B92 television where he hosted the shows Bg Direkt and Viša sila. From 2003 to 2008 he worked for TV Metropolis, hosting the programs Ozbiljne vesti, Dezinformator and Prekid programa. On Fox, and later Prva TV, he worked as the writer and host of the popular show Fajront Republika.

Since 2013 he has hosted "24 minutes with Zoran Kesić", initially broadcast on B92 and currently on Nova S, which he writes together with the authors of satirical web-magazine njuz.net.

Kesić is a strong critic of Aleksandar Vučić and the Serbian Progressive Party.

== Personal life ==
Kesić is married to costume designer Ivana (born Majstorović) since 2013, they have two sons: Andrej (born 2014); and Vanja (born 2017).
