= Ivana Stanković =

Serbian model

- Born: Ivana Stanković; 12 October 1973 (age 52); Belgrade, SFR Yugoslavia
- Modeling information
- Height: 1.80 m (5 ft 11 in)
- Hair color: Dark Brown
- Eye color: Brown

Ivana Stanković (Serbian Cyrillic: Ивана Станковић) born on 12 October 1973 in Belgrade, Serbia, is a Serbian supermodel and is one of the judges of the show Srpski Top Model (Serbian version of America's Next Top Model) which is broadcast on Prva Srpska Televizija. She was on the cover of the Italian Vogue, the first Serbian model ever on a cover of Spanish edition of Vogue magazine in 1994. Ivana was also the face of Armani for five years, worked mostly in Milan and New York, she hasn't worked as a model in Japan, but worked in Germany for Jill Sander and many German fashion designers. In addition, she worked for Police sunglasses with Bruce Willis, and in 2011 she wrote autobiography Bez daha (Breathless). She also worked for: Gucci, Armani, Prada, Donna Karan, Missoni, Calvin Klein. Being supermodel of 1990s era of fashion models, she walked on runway fashion shows with supermodels like Naomi Campbell, Kate Moss, Cindy Crawford and Christy Turlington.
