= Veče sa Ivanom Ivanovićem =

- Genre: Comedy; Chat show
- Presented by: Ivan Ivanović
- Country of origin: Serbia
- Original language: Serbian
- No. of series: 12
- No. of episodes: 514

Production
- Running time: 45–100 minutes
- Production company: Pear Creative Production

Original release
- Network: Prva (2010–2018); Nova S (2019–2024); Blic TV (2024-)
- Release: 14 May 2010 – present

Veče sa Ivanom Ivanovićem (English: Tonight with Ivan Ivanović) is a Serbian late-night talk show, created and hosted by Ivan Ivanović. It was initially premiere-broadcast on Prva Srpska Televizija, from 14 May 2010, before moving to Nova S in April 2019. In September 2024, this show is moved to Blic TV. Since September 2025 has he been live-streaming in his YouTube channel. He has started to use AI in his newest live streams to represent the crowd and laughter.

== Series overview ==
Series	Episodes	Originally released		
Series	Episodes	First released	Last released	Network
1	12	14 May 2010	30 July 2010	Prva TV
2	48	3 September 2010	29 July 2011	Prva TV
3	49	7 September 2011	27 July 2012	Prva TV
4	46	26 July 2012	7 September 2013	Prva TV
5	46	13 September 2013	10 July 2014	Prva TV
6	45	19 September 2014	8 August 2015	Prva TV
7	42	18 September 2015	8 July 2016	Prva TV
8	41	23 September 2016	30 June 2017	Prva TV
9	39	22 September 2017	29 June 2018	Prva TV
10	28	21 September 2018	28 June 2019	Prva TV / Nova S
11	37	20 September 2019	26 June 2020	Nova S
12	37	18 September 2020	25 June 2021	Nova S
13	36	17 September 2021	24 June 2022	Nova S
14	TBA	16 September 2022	TBA	Nova S

== Episodes ==
=== Series 1 (2010) ===
No. overall	No. in series	Guests	Original release date
1	1	Nikola Lazetić and Nenad Okanović	14 May 2010
2	2	Vlada Stanojević and Jelena Tomašević	21 May 2010
3	3	Marija Šerifović and Jovana Janković	28 May 2010
4	4	Seka Aleksić and Ivan Zeljković	4 June 2010
5	5	Sloboda Mićalović and Voja Nedeljković	11 June 2010
6	6	Vesna Dedić and Aleksandar Jovanović	18 June 2010
7	7	Aleksandra Kovač and Sergej Ćetković	25 June 2010
8	8	Marija Kilibarda and Ivan Miljković	2 July 2010
9	9	Saša Kovačević and Nikola Rokvić	9 July 2010
10	10	Goca Tržan and Predrag Azdejković	16 July 2010
11	11	Nikola Rađen and Mina Kostić	23 July 2010
12	12	Nenad Zimonjić and Andrej Kulundžić	30 July 2010

=== Series 2 (2010–11) ===
No. overall	No. in series	Guests	Original release date
13	1	Ana Kokić and Danilo Ikodinović	3 September 2010
14	2	Bora Čorba, Miša Aleksić and Viktor Troicki	10 September 2010
15	3	Nikola Rađen, Andrija Prlainović, Marko Kešelj, Aleksandar Rašić and Nenad Krstić	17 September 2010
16	4	Milka Forcan and Slobodan Živojinović	24 September 2010
17	5	Severina and Kiki Lesandrić	1 October 2010
18	6	Andrija Milošević, Milan Kalinić and Milan Vasić	8 October 2010
19	7	Aki Rahimovski and Nataša Bekvalac	15 October 2010
20	8	Saša Ćurčić and Milorad Mandić	22 October 2010
21	9	Aleksandar Vučić and Suzana Mančić	29 October 2010
22	10	Emir Kusturica and Nele Karajlić	5 November 2010
23	11	Đule "Van Gogh", Gile "Električni Orgazam" and Dubravka Duca Marković	12 November 2010
24	12	Ana Nikolić, Milan Krkobabić and Jovan Krkobabić	19 November 2010
25	13	Janko Tipsarević, Milorad Čavić and Suzana Perić	26 November 2010
26	14	Nina Badrić, Haris Džinović and Melina Džinović	3 December 2010
27	15	Marinko Rokvić, Nikola Rokvić, Marko Rokvić and Boban Petrović	10 December 2010
28	16	Vlado Georgiev and Vladimir Grbić	17 December 2010
29	17	Željko Joksimović and Ivica Dačić	24 December 2010
30	18	New Year Special – Marija Šerifović, Van Gogh, Riblja čorba, Aleksandra Kovač, Aleksandra Radović, Jelena Tomašević and Sergej Ćetković	31 December 2010
31	19	Rambo Petković, Petar Strugar, Nina Janković and Predrag Vasić	7 January 2011
32	20	Ceca and Robert Čoban	14 January 2011
33	21	Svetlana Kitić, Vanja Bulić and Zoran Dašić	21 January 2011
34	22	Dragan Šutanovac, Aleksandra Radović, Igor Butulija and Darko Tijanić	28 January 2011
35	23	Vlade Divac, Snežana Divac and Duško Vujošević	4 February 2011
36	24	Miroslav Ilić, Jova Radovanović and Minja Subota	11 February 2011
37	25	Novak Djokovic	18 February 2011
38	26	Velimir Ilić, Neda Ukraden and Tijana Ćurović	25 February 2011
39	27	Željko Samardžić, Dragan Brajović Braja and Sanja Vuksanović-Žugić	4 March 2011
40	28	Saša Đorđević, Jelena Rozga, Nina Radojičić and Ivana Stanković	11 March 2011
41	29	Ljubiša Samardžić, Seka Sablić and Tamara Grujić	18 March 2011
42	30	Ljuba Vračarević and Karolina Gočeva	25 March 2011
43	31	Lazar Ristovski and Monika Kiš	1 April 2011
44	32	Dragan Vujić and Milan Vilotić	8 April 2011
45	33	Milutin Mrkonjić and Ljiljana Stjepanović	15 April 2011
46	34	Dragan Džajić, Savo Milošević and Ljubiša Tumbaković	22 April 2010
47	35	Nenad Čanak	29 April 2011
48	36	Džej Ramadanovski, Šaban Šaulić, Usnija Redžepova and Ilda Šaulić	6 April 2011
49	37	Dragoljub Ljubičić Mićko, Maja Volk and Ivana Zarić	13 May 2011
50	38	No guests	20 May 2011
51	39	Special about the arrest of Ratko Mladić	27 May 2011
52	40	Žarko Obradović, Mića Jovanović and Milan Stanković	3 June 2011
53	41	Sting and Zdravko Čolić	10 June 2011
54	42	Rade Šerbedžija, Sergej Trifunović and Igor Pavličić	17 June 2011
55	43	Dejan Stanković	24 June 2011
56	44	Tony Cetinski	1 July 2011
57	45	Danica Maksimović, Milan Bošković and Nebojša Višković	8 July 2011
58	46	Lepa Brena and Rayito	15 July 2011
59	47	Emina Jahović and Rasim Ljajić	22 July 2011
60	48	Đole Đogani and Gagi Đogani	29 July 2011

=== Series 3 (2011–12) ===
No. overall	No. in series	Guests	Original release date
61	1	Mira Banjac and Petar Božović	3 September 2011
62	2	Lena Kovačević, Vlado Georgiev and Saša Milošević Mare	9 September 2011
63	3	First grade students (Filip, Dimitrije, Magdalena and Natalija) and Milan Kalinić	16 September 2011
64	4	Bryan Ferry	23 September 2011
65	5	Neša Galija, Dado Topić and Jean Jacques Roscam	30 September 2011
66	6	Jovana Brakočević, Sanja Malagurski, Tatjana Vojtehovski, Milan Colić, Miodrag Colić and Milan Todorović	7 October 2011
67	7	Luís Figo, Nebojša Čović and Svetislav Pešić	14 October 2011
68	8	Aca Lukas, Andrija Milošević and Džej Ramadanovski	21 October 2011
69	9	Srđan Dragojević, Goran Jevtić and Bora Čorba	28 October 2011
70	10	Dino Merlin and Vesna Zmijanac	4 November 2011
71	11	Novi fosili (Sanja Doležal and Rajko Dujmić)	11 November 2011
72	12	Zvonko Bogdan and Oliver Dulić	18 November 2011
73	13	Predrag Živković Tozovac	25 November 2011
74	14	Miroslav Ilić, Dženan Lončarević and Adil	2 December 2011
75	15	Svetlana Bojković and Marko Nikolić	9 December 2011
76	16	Haris Džinović	16 December 2011
77	17	Siniša Mihajlović	23 December 2011
78	18	Davor Jovanović, Igor Terzija and Nevena Đorđević	30 December 2011
79	19	No quests	6 January 2012
80	20	Mima Karadžić and Goca Tržan	13 January 2012
81	21	Aleksandar Berček, Miloš Biković, Tamara Aleksić, Aleksandar Radojčić, Andrija Daničić and Ljubomir Bulajić	20 January 2012
82	22	Branko Kockica	27 January 2012
83	23	Special – Serbia national men's handball team (Veselin Vuković, Momir Ilić, Darko Stanić, Slobodan Soro and Aleksa Šaponjić)	31 January 2012
84	24	Tony Cetinski, Aleksandra Radović and Darinka Matić Marović	3 February 2012
85	25	Parni valjak	10 February 2012
86	26	Merima Njegomir and Cune Gojković	17 February 2012
87	27	Ljubivoje Ršumović and Raša Popov	24 February 2012
88	28	Božidar Đelić	2 March 2012
89	29	Vuk Drašković and Survivor Srbija VIP: Costa Rica contestants	9 March 2012
90	30	Emir Kusturica	16 March 2012
91	31	Vlatko Stefanovski, Tommy Emmanuel, Stochelo Rosenberg, Gordan Kičić and Branislav Trifunović	23 March 2012
92	32	Kiki Lesandrić and Mima Karadžić, Sanja Jovićević, Momčilo Otašević, Božo Zuber, Lazar Rađenović	30 March 2012
93	33	Beogradski sindikat	6 April 2012
94	34	YU Grupa and Sergej Ćetković	13 April 2012
95	35	Rudy Giuliani, Željko Vasić and Melina Džinović	20 April 2012
96	36	Presidential Election Special – Boris Tadić	27 April 2012
97	37	Gabi Novak and Tereza Kesovija	4 May 2012
98	38	Nina Badrić; Presidential Election Special – Tomislav Nikolić	11 May 2012
99	39	Robert Prosinečki	18 May 2012
100	40	Bajaga i Instruktori	25 May 2012
101	41	Zaz	1 June 2012
102	42	Tonči Huljić and Petar Grašo	8 June 2012
103	43	Prljavo kazalište (Jasenko Houra and Davorin Bogović) and Vuk Jeremić	15 June 2012
104	44	Mladen Vojičić Tifa, Bojan Marović and Ana Stanić	22 June 2012
105	45	Dragan Đilas	29 June 2012
106	46	Asmir Kolašinac, Emir Bekrić, Dragutin Topić and Biljana Topić	6 July 2012
107	47	Jasna Šekarić, Zorana Arunović, Mihail Dudaš, Ivan Lenđer and Marko Novaković	13 July 2012
108	48	Jean-Marc Barr, Mira Furlan and Zoran Simjanović	20 July 2012
109	49	Armand Assante	27 July 2012

=== Series 4 (2012–13) ===
No. overall	No. in series	Guests	Original release date
110	1	Second grade students (Filip, Dimitrije, Magdalena and Natalija) and Vanja Udovičić	7 September 2012
111	2	Tanja Dragić, Vlastimir Golubović, Zoran Mićović, Radovan Žunić, Milko Đurđević and Đorđe Stojanović	14 September 2012
112	3	Nick Vujičić and Dragan Marković Palma	21 September 2012
113	4	Tozovac and Milorad Čavić	28 September 2012
114	5	Marina Abramović and LGBT activists (Bojana Ivković, Goran Miletić and Boban Stojanović)	5 October 2012
115	6	Kemal Monteno, Bojana Maljević, Marija Karan and Nina Janković	12 October 2012
116	7	Radoš Bajić, Nedeljko Bajić and Jelena Bajić Jočić	19 October 2012
117	8	Branka Petrić and Uliks Fehmiju	26 October 2012
118	9	Ivica Dačić	2 November 2012
119	10	Jelena Janković, Nenad Okanović and Marko Vidojković	9 November 2012
120	11	Emir Hadžihafizbegović, Zoran Cvijanović and Predrag Bjelac	16 November 2012
121	12	Veselin Šljivančanin and Goran Šepa Gale	23 November 2012
122	13	Milorad Dodik	30 November 2012
123	14	Stjepan Mesić	7 December 2012
124	15	Miljana Gavrilović, Marko Živić, and Prljavo kazalište (Jasenko Houra and Mladen Bodalec)	14 December 2012
125	16	Nele Karajlić, Milorad Milinković Debeli, and Haris Džinović	21 December 2012
126	17	New Year Special – Santa Claus	28 December 2012
127	18	Plavi Orkestar	11 January 2013
128	19	John Challis and Prvi glas Srbije 2nd season finalists (Mirna Radulović, Nevena Božović, and Sara Jovanović)	18 January 2013
129	20	Aleksandra Radović, Vlado Georgiev, Saša Milošević Mare and Mirna Radulović	25 January 2013
130	21	Sergej Ćetković and Josipa Lisac	1 February 2013
131	22	Branko Đurić and Bojan Zulfikarpašić	8 February 2013
132	23	Marija Kilibarda and Andrija Milošević	15 February 2013
133	24	Milena Dravić	22 February 2013
134	25	Željko Samardžić, Michael Madsen and Iman Crosson	1 March 2013
135	26	Ivan Bosiljčić and Rade Šerbedžija	8 March 2013
136	27	Concha Buika	15 March 2013
137	28	Live Special – Milojko Pantić	22 March 2013
138	29	Dragan Đilas and Avram Izrael	29 March 2013
139	30	Branislav Lečić and Petar Strugar	5 April 2013
140	31	Rambo Amadeus, Jovica Jovičić and Željko Vasić	12 April 2013
141	32	Državni posao cast (Dimitrije Banjac, Dejan Ćirjaković and Nikola Škorić)	19 April 2013
142	33	Anica Dobra, Nikola Đuričko, Vlatko Stefanovski and Tommy Emmanuel	26 April 2013
143	34	Carl Lewis and Rudolph van Veen	3 May 2013
144	35	Veče bez Ivana Ivanovića – host: Đorđe Balašević; guests: Ivan Ivanović and Olja Balašević	10 May 2013
145	36	Tomislav Nikolić	17 May 2013
146	37	Andrija Prlainović, Duško Pjetlović, Slobodan Soro and Stefan Mitrović	24 May 2013
147	38	Dino Rađa, Vlade Divac and Ana Divac; music guest: Van Gogh	31 May 2013
148	39	Bajaga i Instruktori	7 June 2013
149	40	Oliver Mlakar and Predrag Marković	14 June 2013
150	41	Marija Šerifović, Alexander Rybak and Bad Copy	21 June 2013
151	42	Eddy Grant	28 June 2013
152	43	Marina Maljković, Milica Dabović and Ana Dabović	5 July 2013
153	44	Show’s assistant director (Bane Dimitrijević)	12 July 2013
154	45	Eric Burdon	19 July 2013
155	46	Nurgül Yeşilçay and Ahmet Boyacioglu	26 July 2013

=== Series 5 (2013–14) ===
No. overall	No. in series	Guests	Original release date
156	1	Third grade students (Filip, Dimitrije, Magdalena and Natalija) and Vanja Udovičić	13 September 2013
157	2	Emir Bekrić and Ivana Španović	21 September 2013
158	3	Milan Lane Gutović and Bojana Maljević	27 September 2013
159	4	Dragana Mirković	4 October 2013
160	5	Seid Memić Vajta	11 October 2013
161	6	Dani Klein	18 October 2013
162	7	Nebojša Stefanović and Zorana Mihajlović	25 October 2013
163	8	Nenad Milijaš and Saša Ilić	1 November 2013
164	9	Dragan Jovanović	8 November 2013
165	10	Saša Popović and Tony Cetinski	15 November 2013
166	11	Knez and Željko Šašić	22 November 2013
167	12	Mariza and Marija Šerifović	29 November 2013
168	13	Dara Džokić	6 December 2013
169	14	Tvoje lice zvuči poznato cast (Ana Kokić, Tamara Dragičević, Wikluh Sky, Snežana Babić, Aleksa Jelić and Boris Milivojević)	13 December 2013
170	15	Vlasta Velisavljević and Dragan Vujić; music guests: Nevena Božović, Neverne Bebe	20 December 2013
171	16	Special – Serbia women's national handball team	23 December 2013
172	17	Miloš Biković and Brankica Sebastijanović	27 December 2013
173	18	New Year Special – Vlado Georgiev	31 December 2013
174	19	Ana Kokić, Petar Strugar, Marija Kilibarda, Katarina Radivojević and Marija Mihajlović	3 January 2014
175	20	Žika Nikolić and Nada Macur	10 January 2014
176	21	Andrija Milošević, Milan Kalinić and Milan Vasić	17 January 2014
177	22	Dragan Bjelogrlić and Magnifico	24 January 2014
178	23	Miki Manojlović	31 January 2014
179	24	Novak Djokovic	4 February 2014
180	25	Hari Mata Hari; music guests: Bad Copy	7 February 2014
181	26	Ana Bekuta	14 February 2014
182	27	Parni Valjak	21 February 2014
183	28	Zdravko Šotra, Sloboda Mićalović and Vojin Ćetković	28 February 2014
184	29	Draga Saveta cast (Danka Novović, Ruška Jakić and Branka Vučković)	7 March 2014
185	30	Milan Todorović, Franco Nero and Sofija Rajović	14 March 2014
186	31	Marijana Mićić, Kristina Radenković, Nebojša Đorđević and Marina Vodeničar; music guest: Dubioza kolektiv	21 March 2014
187	32	Anthony LaPaglia	28 March 2014
188	33	Nebojša Glogovac; music guests: Cigani Ivanovići	4 April 2014
189	34	José Feliciano, Dragana Mirković and Dwight Yorke	11 April 2014
190	35	Milomir Marić and Saša Vasić	18 April 2014
191	36	Dušan Savić and Vlado Georgiev	25 April 2014
192	37	Tanja Bošković and Aleksandar Šapić; music guests: Aleksa Jelić, Tijana Bogićević and Dragi Jelić	2 May 2014
193	38	Marko Jarić; music guests: THC La Familija	9 May 2014
194	39	Telethon "Call & Help" (charity special for victims of the 2014 floods)	23 May 2014
195	40	Special – FK Crvena zvezda championship team	27 May 2014
196	41	Gorica Nešović and Dragan Ilić; music guests: Aleksandra Radović and Dejan Cukić	30 May 2014
197	42	Željko Joksimović	6 June 2014
198	43	Ples sa Zvedama cast (Konstantin Kostjukov, Aleksandar Josipović, Irina Vukotić and Aleksa Jelić)	13 June 2014
199	44	Ivan Mihailović, Marija Martinović, Marija Prelević, Nikola Mandić, Davor Gobac, Dušan Kecman and Jan Vesely	20 June 2014
200	45	Billy Idol	27 June 2014
201	46	Sara Jovanović and Viktor Troicki; music guest: Beng Koks	4 July 2014
202	47	Gloria Gaynor	10 July 2014

=== Series 6 (2014–15) ===
No. overall	No. in series	Guests	Original release date
203	1	Fourth grade students (Filip, Dimitrije, Magdalena and Natalija) and Vanja Udovičić	19 September 2014
204	2	former Zvezde Granda contestants (Dragi Domić, Dušan Svilar, Petar Mitić, Rada Manojlović, Ivana Pavković, Biljana Sečivanović) and Dr Alban	26 September 2014
205	3	Petar Strugar and Sergej Trifunović	10 September 2014
206	4	Dejan Stanković and Míchel Salgado;	17 October 2014
207	5	Boris Novković, Boris Milivojević, Nataša Tapušković and Bora Đorđević	24 October 2014
208	6	Haris Džinović, Ana Bekuta and Šaban Šaulić	31 October 2014
209	7	Tvoje lice zvuči poznato cast (Branko Đurić, Marija Kilibarda, Marija Mihajlović and Bojan Ivković )	7 November 2014
210	8	Sergej Ćetković and Vlado Georgiev	14 November 2014
211	9	Aleksandar Milić Mili	21 November 2014
212	10	Zdravko Čolić	28 November 2014
213	11	Ivanović's 500th appearance on Prva TV special – Gibonni	4 December 2014
214	12	Zvonimir Đukić Đule "Van Gogh", Dragan Jovanović and Branka Pujić	5 December 2014
215	13	Plácido Domingo	12 December 2014
216	14	Anica Dobra and Gordan Kičić; music guest: Regina	19 December 2014
217	15	Tvoje lice zvuči poznato cast (Bane Mojićević, Jelena Gavrilović, Katarina Bogićević, Elena Risteska and Nenad Okanović)	26 December 2014
218	16	Tvoje lice zvuči poznato cast (Bane Mojićević, Zvonko Pantović and Ivan Jevtović)	2 January 2015
219	17	Special – "Five Men"	9 January 2015
220	18	Dragan Vujić Vujke, Nikola Bulatović, Dušica Novaković	16 January 2015
221	19	No guests	30 January 2015
222	20	Bojana Lekić and Massimo Savić	6 February 2015
223	21	Borko Stafanović	13 February 2015
224	22	Ljiljana Blagojević	20 February 2015
225	23	Darko Bajić and John Savage	27 February 2015
226	24	Richard Dreyfuss	6 March 2015
227	25	Dimitrije Banjac, Nikola Škorić, Dejan Ćirjaković, Ellen Kuras and Ivana Španović	13 March 2015
228	26	Mašan Lekić; music guest: Nikola Rokvić	20 March 2015
229	27	Nataša Miljković, Maja Nikolić and Slavko Beleslin; music guest: Kal	27 March 2015
230	28	Zoran Moka Slavnić; music guest: Enormna Blajsna	3 April 2015
231	29	Rada Đurić	10 April 2015
232	30	Vojin Ćetković and Dejan Lutkić	17 April 2015
233	31	Music guests: The Makemakes	24 April 2015
234	32	Mirjana Bobić Mojsilović	1 May 2015
235	33	Special – KK Crvena zvezda championship team	7 May 2015
236	34	Predrag Peđa Stojaković	8 May 2015
237	35	Serbian Army Guardsmen; music guest: St. Louis Band	15 May 2015
238	36	Dejan Tomašević; music guest: Horislavci	22 May 2015
239	37	Karolina Gočeva	29 May 2015
240	38	Special – "Večevizija – We Understand the Future"	5 June 2015
241	39	2Cellos	12 June 2015
242	40	Buddy Valastro	19 June 2015
243	41	Special – Serbia national under-20 football team	23 June 2015
244	42	Miško Ražnatović and Nikola Peković	26 July 2015
245	43	Vassilis Spanoulis	3 July 2015
246	44	Special – "Četiri i po muškarca"	10 July 2015
247	45	Alexander, Crown Prince of Yugoslavia	17 July 2015

=== Series 7 (2015–16) ===
Number of episode	Air Date	Guests
248	18 September 2015	Fifth grade students (Filip, Dimitrije, Magdalena and Natalija) and Vanja Udovičić
249	21 September 2015	Muškarci
250	25 September 2015	Slobodan Šarenac
251	28 September 2015	Muškarci; music guest: Marčelo
252	2 October 2015	Jelena Đoković and Boris Becker
253	5 October 2015	Muškarci
254	9 October 2015	Srđan Dinčić, Aleksandar Perišić and Nikola Silić
255	12 October 2015	Muškarci
256	16 October 2015	Andrija Milošević, Aca Lukas and Dušan Borković
257	19 October 2015	Veče sa Ivanom Ivanovićem i muškarcima
258	23 October 2015	Anđelka Prpić and David Coverdale; music guest: Karolina Gočeva
259	26 October 2015	Veče sa Ivanom Ivanovićem i muškarcima
260	30 October 2015	Željko Bebek
261	2 November 2015	Veče sa Ivanom Ivanovićem i muškarcima
262	6 November 2015	Vuk Kostic and Viktor Savić; music guest: Marija Šerifović
263	9 November 2015	Veče sa Ivanom Ivanovićem i muškarcima
264	13 November 2015	Nikola Kojo, Nikola Đuričko, Srdjan Timarov and Miroljub Turajlija
265	16 November 2015	Veče sa Ivanom Ivanovićem i muškarcima
266	20 November 2015	Janko Tipsarević and Nataša Kovačević; music guest: Frajle
267	23 November 2015	Veče sa Ivanom Ivanovićem i muškarcima
268	27 November 2015	Toma Fila; music guest: Martina Vrbos
269	30 November 2015	Veče sa Ivanom Ivanovićem i muškarcima
270	4 December 2015	Steven Seagal and Željko Joksimović
271	7 December 2015	Veče sa Ivanom Ivanovićem i muškarcima
272	11 December 2015	Peter Schmeichel and Yu Grupa
273	14 December 2015	Veče sa Ivanom Ivanovićem i muškarcima
274	18 December 2015	Haris Džinović, Leontina Vukomanović, Minja Subota and Bane Krstić (Garavi Sokak)
275	21 December 2015	Veče sa Ivanom Ivanovićem i muškarcima
276	25 December 2015	Svetislav Goncić, Rade Marjanović and Bojana Stefanović
277	28 December 2015	Veče sa Ivanom Ivanovićem i muškarcima
278	1 January 2016	New Year Special – Audience
279	4 January 2016	Veče sa Ivanom Ivanovićem i muškarcima
-	8 January 2016	no show
280	11 January 2016	Veče sa Ivanom Ivanovićem i muškarcima
281	15 January 2016	Dejan Pantelić
282	18 January 2016	Veče sa Ivanom Ivanovićem i muškarcima
283	22 January 2016	Zoran Modli and Branko Đurić
284	25 January 2016	Dejan Savić, Živko Gocić, Filip Filipović, Gojko Pijetlović, Dušan Mandić and Stefan Mitrović
285	29 January 2016	Veče sa Ivanom Ivanovićem i muškarcima
286	1 February 2016	Muškarci; guest:Aleksandar Perišić and Predrag Azdejković; music guest: Hladno pivo
287	5 February 2016	Marina Tucaković and Aleksandar Šapić
288	8 February 2016	Veče sa Ivanom Ivanovićem i muškarcima
289	12 February 2016	Borislav Stanković; music guest: Marija Šerifović and Nevena Božović
290	15 February 2016	Veče sa Ivanom Ivanovićem i muškarcima
291	19 February 2016	Ljubiša Ristić and Rada Đuričin
292	22 February 2016	Veče sa Ivanom Ivanovićem i muškarcima
293	26 February 2016	Dragan Mićanović and Sergej Trifunović
294	29 February 2016	Veče sa Ivanom Ivanovićem i muškarcima
295	4 March 2016	Miodrag Božović and Blažo Raosavljević
296	7 March 2016	Veče sa Ivanom Ivanovićem i muškarcima
297	11 March 2016	Dara Bubamara, Bogoljub Mitić Đoša and Nikola Rokvić
298	14 March 2016	Veče sa Ivanom Ivanovićem i muškarcima
299	18 March 2016	Ivan Bekjarev, Milica Milša and Milan Caci Mihailović
300	21 March 2016	Veče sa Ivanom Ivanovićem i muškarcima
301	25 March 2016	Tatjana Vojtehovski
302	28 March 2016	Veče sa Ivanom Ivanovićem i muškarcima
303	1 April 2016	Ivana Peters
304	4 April 2016	Veče sa Ivanom Ivanovićem i muškarcima
305	8 April 2016	Boško Jakovljević
306	11 April 2016	Veče sa Ivanom Ivanovićem i muškarcima
307	15 April 2016	Nenad Okanović and Jelica Kovačević
308	18 April 2016	Veče sa Ivanom Ivanovićem i muškarcima; guest:Nick Vujicic
309	22 April 2016	Vlado Georgiev and Dado Topić
-	25 April 2016	no show
310	29 April 2016	Katarina Kaya Ostojić, Halid Muslimović, Marija Kilibarda and Sergej Trifunović
311	2 May 2016	Veče sa Ivanom Ivanovićem i muškarcima; guest:Aleksandar Perišić
312	6 May 2016	Marka Žvaka and Yasserstain
313	9 May 2016	Veče sa Ivanom Ivanovićem i muškarcima
314	13 May 2016	Ljubomir Bandović
315	16 May 2016	Veče sa Ivanom Ivanovićem i muškarcima
316	20 May 2016	Nenad Danilović "Nesha Bridges" and Daniel Kajmakoski
317	23 May 2016	Veče sa Ivanom Ivanovićem i muškarcima
318	27 May 2016	Radomir Antić
319	30 May 2016	Veče sa Ivanom Ivanovićem i muškarcima
320	3 June 2016	Tarik Filipović
321	6 June 2016	Veče sa Ivanom Ivanovićem i muškarcima
322	10 June 2016	Dragoljub Mićunović and Prljavo kazalište
323	13 June 2016	Veče sa Ivanom Ivanovićem i muškarcima
324	17 June 2016	Nina Badrić, Željko Vasić and Martina Vrbos
325	20 June 2016	Veče sa Ivanom Ivanovićem i muškarcima
326	24 June 2016	John Newman
327	27 June 2016	Veče sa Ivanom Ivanovićem i muškarcima

=== Series 8 (2016–17) ===
Number of episode	Air Date	Guests
328	19 September 2016	Veče sa Ivanom Ivanovićem i muškarcima
329	23 September 2016	Sixth grade students (Filip, Dimitrije, Magdalena and Natalija), Vanja Udovičić and Tijana Bogdanović
330	26 September 2016	Veče sa Ivanom Ivanovićem i muškarcima
331	30 September 2016	Cafu and Stevan Stojanović
332	3 October 2016	Veče sa Ivanom Ivanovićem i muškarcima
333	7 October 2016	Alain Delon
334	10 October 2016	Veče sa Ivanom Ivanovićem i muškarcima

=== Series 10 (2018–19) ===
No. overall	No. in series	Guests	Original release date
366	1	Crvena Zvezda FK players (Vujadin Savić, Filip Stojković, Marko Gobeljić, Milan Borjan) and eight grade students (Filip, Dimitrije, Magdalena and Natalija)	21 September 2018
367	2	Lepa Brena, Aleksandar Srećković and Srđan Timarov	28 September 2018
368	3	Mario Biondi and Anđelka Prpić	5 October 2018
369	4	Dubravka Mijatović	12 October 2018
370	5	Aleksandra Radović	19 October 2018
371	6	Miloš Biković, Miloš Timotijević, Srđan Todorović and Serbia national women's volleyball team (Maja Simanić, Tijana Bošković, Brankica Mihajlović and Zoran Terzić)	26 October 2018
372	7	Mark Gvero, Nenad Okanović and Aleksandra Kovač	2 November 2018
373	8	Žarko Paspalj	9 November 2018
374	9	Andrija Milošević, Sloboda Mićalović, Viktor Savić and Aleksandra Tomić	16 November 2018
375	10	Božo Vrećo	23 November 2018
376	11	Haris Džinović and Željko Joksimović	30 November 2018
377	12	Milorad Mažić	7 December 2018
378	13	Marko Pantelić	14 December 2018
379	14	Žarko Laušević	21 December 2018
380	15	New Year Special – Vlado Georgiev	Cancelled
381	16	Olja Bećković	5 April 2019
382	17	Anđelka Prpić	12 April 2019
383	18	Dejan Savićević	19 April 2019
384	19	Petar Božović	26 April 2019
385	20	Marija Šerifović	3 May 2019
386	21	Andrija Milošević and Branko Đurić Đuro	10 May 2019
387	22	Nele Karajlić	17 May 2019
388	23	Nebojša Dugalić	24 May 2019
389	24	Savo Milošević and Nenad Milijaš	31 May 2019
390	25	Boban Marjanović	7 June 2019
391	26	Seka Aleksić	14 June 2019
392	27	Bruno Langer	21 June 2019
393	28	Filip Krajinović, Laslo Djere and Dušan Lajović	28 June 2019

=== Series 11 (2019–20) ===
No. overall	No. in series	Guests	Original release date
394	1	Maja Nikolić and Nataša Miljković	20 September 2019
395	2	Tamara Dragičević, Petar Benčina and Jelisaveta Orašanin	27 September 2019
396	3	Husein Hasanefendić, Aki Rahimovski and Vesna Pešić	4 October 2019
397	4	Slobodan Kovač	11 October 2019
398	5	Svetlana Bojković, Nikola Pejaković and Ana Stanić	18 October 2019
399	6	Momčilo Bajagić Bajaga	25 October 2019
400	7	Dragan Bjelogrlić, Andrija Kuzmanović, Nebojša Dugalić, Marija Bergam and Leona Paraminski	1 November 2019
401	8	Gordan Kičić, Nina Janković and Lena Lazović	8 November 2019
402	9	Zdravko Čolić	15 November 2019
403	10	Ljubiša Tumbaković	22 November 2019
404	11	Matija Bećković	29 November 2019
405	12	Nataša Ninković, Vesna Čipčić and Branko Đurić Đuro	6 December 2019
406	13	Janko Tipsarević	13 December 2019
407	14	Ivan Ivanović, Branislav Raičević, Srđan Dinčić Điđa, Dragan Ilić, Slobodan Nešović Loka (4 i po muškarca reunion)	20 December 2019
408	15	New Year Special	27 December 2019
409	16	Predrag Manojlović	31 January 2020
410	17	Milan St. Protić	7 February 2020
411	18	Srdan Golubović and Goran Bogdan	14 February 2020
412	19	Sergej Trifunović	21 February 2020
413	20	Nebojša Medojević	28 February 2020
414	21	Marko Živić and Dragan Vujić	6 March 2020
415	22	Miloš Biković, Ljubomir Bandović and Miodrag Radonjić	13 March 2020
416	23	Danijela Stanković Zdravković (midwife), Jelisaveta Orašanin and Momčilo Bajagić Bajaga	20 March 2020
417	24	Mladen Durić (Grigorije; bishop)	27 March 2020
418	25	Ana Lalić (journalist) and Andrija Milošević	3 April 2020
419	26	Dragan Jovanović	10 April 2020
420	27	Goran Ivanišević	17 April 2020
421	28	Nina Badrić and Branislav Lečić	24 April 2020
422	29	Jovana Brakočević and Svetislav Pešić	1 May 2020
423	30	Branko Đurić and Vlado Georgiev	8 May 2020
424	31	Siniša Mihajlović	15 May 2020
425	32	Ljiljana Blagojević, Branislav Trifunović and Tihana Lazović	22 May 2020
426	33	Sloboda Mićalović, Milan Marić and Rada Đurić	29 May 2020
427	34	Dragoljub Ljubičić, Voja Žanetić and Dragoljub Petrović	5 June 2020
428	35	Saša Obradović	19 June 2020
429	36	Slobodan Georgiev, Goran Dimitrijević, Jelena Obućina (editors at Newsmax Adria) and Billy Gould (Faith No More)	26 June 2020

== See also ==
- Marko Živić Show
