= Tvoje lice zvuči poznato (Serbian TV series) season 3 =

Tvoje lice zvuči poznato
- Season 3
- Presented by: Marija Kilibarda
- Judges: Vlado Georgiev; Ana Kokić; Ivan Ivanović; Guest judge
- No. of contestants: 10
- Winner: Nikola Jakšić
- Runner-up: Nikola Rokvić

Release
- Original network: Prva Srpska Televizija
- Original release: 6 March – 21 May 2016

Season chronology
- ← Previous; Season 2 Next → Season 4

Tvoje lice zvuči poznato 3 (Serbian Cyrillic: Твоје лице звучи познато) is the third season of the Serbian TV series Tvoje lice zvuči poznato based on the international franchise Your Face Sounds Familiar. It aired between March 6 and May 21, 2016. The main judging panel consisted of singer and series one winner Ana Kokić, singer-songwriter Vlado Georgiev and talk show host Ivan Ivanović. Marija Kilibarda returned for third time as the host. Waterpolo Player Nikola Jakšić was declared winner of the third season.

== Format ==
The show challenges celebrities (singers and actors) to perform as different iconic music artists every week, which are chosen by the show's "Randomiser". They are then judged by the panel of celebrity judges including Ivan Ivanović, Ana Kokić and Vlado Georgiev. Each week, one celebrity guest judge joins Ivan, Ana and Vlado to make up the complete judging panel. Each celebrity gets transformed into a different singer each week, and performs an iconic song and dance routine well known by that particular singer (for example, in third episode Neša Bridžis has performed song in two different languages on same time: Italian and English, with emulating the two singers on same time). The 'randomiser' can choose any older or younger artist available in the machine, or even a singer of the opposite sex, or a deceased singer. Winner of each episode wins €1000, and winner of whole show wins €25000. All money goes to charity of winner's own choice. The show lasts 12 weeks.

=== Voting ===
The contestants are awarded points from the judges (and each other) based on their singing, Acting and dance routines. Judges give points from 2 to 12, with the exception of 11. After that, each contestant gives 5 points to a fellow contestant of their choice (known as "Bonus" points). In week 11 (semi-final week) and in week 12 (final week), viewers also vote via text messages. In week 11 (semi-final), all judges points from past weeks and from semi-final are made into points from 2 to 12 (without 11). Contestants with most judges points will get 12 points, second placed will get 10, third placed 9 and 10th placed will get only 2 points. After that, public votes will also be made into points from 2 to 12, again with the exception of 11. Contestant with most public votes will get 12 points, second placed 10 and 10th placed will get only 2. All those points will be summed up and five contestants with most points will go to final week. In final week, judges will not vote - contestant with most public vote will win the show.

== Contestants ==
Celebrity	Notability	Episode(s) won	Total score	Result
Mirza Selimović	Singer and former Zvezde Granda	3rd, final	436	Winner
Nikola Rokvić	Singer	1st	356	Runner-up
Neša Bridžis	Stand-up comedian	6th	364	Second runner-up
Katarina Kaya Ostojić	Singer	4th, semi-final	392	4th place
Ivana Peters	Former Tap 011 and Negative singer	2nd	436	5th place
Ana Grubin	Television presenter	5th	346	6th place
Dara Bubamara	Singer	8th	325	7th place
Suzana Mančić	Television personality, actress and singer	9th	282	8th place
Halid Muslimović	Singer	10th	274	9th place
Bogoljub Mitić Đoša	Actor and comedian	7th	238	10th place

== Week 1 ==
Guest Judge: Stefan Mitrović
Aired: March 6, 2016
Winner: Nikola Rokvić

Order	Celebrity	Performing as	Song	Points (judges and contestants)					Total	Result
Order	Celebrity	Performing as	Song	Stefan	Vlado	Ivan	Ana	Bonus	Total	Result
1	Katarina Ostojić Kaya	Pink	"Raise Your Glass"	9	9	10	9	20	57	2nd
2	Nikola Rokvić	Kaliopi	"Rođeni"	12	12	12	12	25	73	1st (Winner)
3	Halid Muslimović	Alen Islamović	"Nakon svih ovih godina" / "Motori"	3	4	3	6	0	16	9th
4	Ivana Peters	Bisera Veletanlić	"Zlatni dan"	10	10	9	8	0	37	3rd
5	Neša Bridžis	Mitar Mirić	"Ne može nam niko ništa" / "Doberman"	2	2	2	2	5	13	10th
6	Ana Grubin	David Bowie	"Space Oddity" / "Heroes"	4	8	7	5	0	24	6th
7	Slavica Ćukteraš	Vesna Zmijanac	"Da budemo noćas zajedno"	7	5	4	3	0	19	7th
8	Dara Bubamara	Jennifer Lopez	"Feel the Light" / "Booty"	5	7	8	10	0	30	4th
9	Bogoljub Mitić Đoša	Verka Serduchka	"Dancing Lasha Tumbai"	6	3	5	4	0	18	8th
10	Nikola Jakšić	Gibonni	"Mirakul"	8	6	6	7	0	27	5th

Bonus points

- Kaya gave five points to Nikola Rokvić
- Nikola Rokvić gave five points to Kaya
- Halid Muslimović gave five points to Kaya
- Ivana Peters gave five points to Nikola Rokvić
- Neša Bridžis gave five points to Kaya
- Ana Grubin gave five points to Nikola Rokvić
- Slavica Ćukteraš gave five points to Kaya
- Dara Bubamara gave five points to Nikola Rokvić
- Đoša gave five points to Neša Bridžis
- Nikola Jakšić gave five points to Nikola Rokvić

== Week 2 ==
Guest Judge: Knez
Aired: March 13, 2016
Winner: Ivana Peters

Order	Celebrity	Performing as	Song	Points (judges and contestants)					Total	Result
Order	Celebrity	Performing as	Song	Knez	Vlado	Ivan	Ana	Bonus	Total	Result
1	Nikola Jakšić	Bruno Mars	"Uptown Funk"	8	10	7	9	0	34	3rd
2	Bogoljub Mitić Đoša	Knez	"Adio" / "Ne kukaj nam djede Niko" / "Balkan boy"	5	2	2	2	0	11	10th
3	Dara Bubamara	Rambo Amadeus	"Adio" / "Ne kukaj nam djede Niko" / "Balkan boy"	6	4	3	5	5	23	9th
4	Ana Grubin	MØ	"Lean On"	4	5	5	7	5	26	7th
5	Nikola Rokvić	Marinko Rokvić	"Skitnica"	10	9	6	4	0	29	5th
6	Katarina Ostojić Kaya	Rihanna	"Stay" / "The Real Slim Shady" / "The Monster"	7	7	9	8	0	31	4th
7	Neša Bridžis	Eminem	"Stay" / "The Real Slim Shady" / "The Monster"	9	8	10	12	15	54	2nd
8	Halid Muslimović	Stoja	"Bela ciganka"	3	6	8	6	0	23	8th
9	Ivana Peters	Paloma Faith	"Only Love Can Hurt Like This"	12	12	12	10	10	56	1st (Winner)
10	Slavica Ćukteraš	Kerber	"Dođi"	2	3	4	3	15	27	6th

Bonus points

- Nikola Jakšić gave five points to Neša Bridžis
- Đoša gave five points to Dara Bubamara
- Dara Bubamara gave five points to Neša Bridžis
- Ana Grubin gave five points to Slavica Ćukteraš
- Nikola Rokvić gave five points to Ivana Peters
- Neša Bridžis gave five points to Ana Grubin
- Kaya gave five points to Slavica Ćukteraš
- Halid Muslimović gave five points to Neša Bridžis
- Ivana Peters gave five points to Slavica Ćukteraš
- Slavica Ćukteraš gave five points to Ivana Peters

== Week 3 ==
Guest Judge: Saša Popović
Aired: March 20, 2016
Winner: Nikola Jakšić

Order	Celebrity	Performing as	Song	Points (judges and contestants)					Total	Result
Order	Celebrity	Performing as	Song	Saša	Vlado	Ivan	Ana	Bonus	Total	Result
1	Ana Grubin	Wikluh Sky	"Esi mi dobar" / "Otkucaji"	3	4	5	2	5	19	8th
2	Halid Muslimović	Davorin Popović	"Žute dunje"	9	9	8	10	0	36	4th
3	Nikola Jakšić	Tina Turner	"Golden Eye"	12	6	12	12	15	57	1st (Winner)
4	Nikola Rokvić	Enrique Iglesias	"Bailando"	7	5	7	6	0	25	7th
5	Bogoljub Mitić Đoša	Đorđe Balašević	"Devojka sa čardaš nogama"	2	3	3	3	5	16	9th
6	Ivana Peters	Axl Rose	"You Could Be Mine"	10	8	10	7	10	45	2nd
7	Katarina Ostojić Kaya	Ivana Peters	"Svet tuge" / "Zbog tebe"	8	7	9	8	5	37	3rd
8	Neša Bridžis	Eros Ramazzotti & Cher	"Piu che puoi"	4	2	4	5	0	15	10th
9	Milica Pavlović	Ceca	"Kukavica" / "Pusti me da raskinem sa njom" / "Insomnia" / "Upravo Ostavljena"	6	10	6	4	5	31	6th
10	Dara Bubamara	Jelena Karleuša	"Kukavica" / "Pusti me da raskinem sa njom" / "Insomnia" / "Upravo Ostavljena"	5	12	2	9	5	33	5th

Bonus points

- Ana Grubin gave five points to Đoša
- Halid Muslimović gave five points to Nikola Jakšić
- Nikola Jakšić gave five points to Ivana Peters
- Nikola Rokvić gave five points to Nikola Jakšić
- Đoša gave five points to Ana Grubin
- Ivana Peters gave five points to Kaya
- Kaya gave five points to Ivana Peters
- Neša Bridžis gave five points to Nikola Jakšić
- Milica Pavlović gave five points to Dara Bubamara
- Dara Bubamara gave five points to Milica Pavlović

== Week 4 ==
Guest Judge: Branko Đurić
Aired: March 27, 2016
Winner: Kaya

Order	Celebrity	Performing as	Song	Points (judges and contestants)					Total	Result
Order	Celebrity	Performing as	Song	Đuro	Vlado	Ivan	Ana	Bonus	Total	Result
1	Daniel Kajmakoski	Goran Bregović	"Kalašnjikov"	10	7	5	5	0	27	7th
2	Suzana Mančić	Haris Džinović	"Rano je za tugu"	2	5	2	3	0	12	9th
3	Dara Bubamara	Saša Matić	"Nađi novu ljubav" / "More tuge" / "Moja štikla"	4	6	4	7	0	21	8th
4	Bogoljub Mitić Đoša	Severina	"Nađi novu ljubav" / "More tuge" / "Moja štikla"	8	3	10	6	5	32	4th
5	Ana Grubin	Lady Gaga	"Til It Happens To You"	7	8	6	12	15	48	2nd
6	Ivana Peters	Freddie Mercury	"Barcelona"	9	12	12	9	5	47	3rd
7	Nikola Rokvić	Montserrat Caballe	"Barcelona"	6	9	8	8	0	31	5th
8	Neša Bridžis	Dara Bubamara	"Noć za nas"	5	4	7	4	10	30	6th
9	Katarina Ostojić Kaya	Sam Smith	"Writing's on the Wall"	12	10	9	10	15	56	1st (Winner)
10	Halid Muslimović	Zdravko Čolić	"Zelena si rijeka bila" / "Čaje Šukarije"	3	2	3	2	0	10	10th

Bonus points

- Daniel Kajmakoski gave five points to Kaya
- Suzana Mančić gave five points to Kaya
- Dara Bubamara gave five points to Neša Bridžis
- Đoša gave five points to Ana Grubin
- Ana Grubin gave five points to Đoša
- Ivana Peters gave five points to Ana Grubin
- Nikola Rokvić gave five points to Ivana Peters
- Neša Bridžis gave five points to Kaya
- Kaya gave five points to Neša Bridžis
- Halid Muslimović gave five points to Ana Grubin

== Week 5 ==
Guest Judge: Nikola Rađen
Aired: April 3, 2016
Winner: Ana Grubin

Order	Celebrity	Performing as	Song	Points (judges and contestants)					Total	Result
Order	Celebrity	Performing as	Song	Nikola	Vlado	Ivan	Ana	Bonus	Total	Result
1	Suzana Mančić	Kylie Minogue	"All The Lovers"	5	4	7	4	5	25	6th
2	Dara Bubamara	Vlado Georgiev	"Iskreno" / "Tropski bar"	7	9	4	6	5	31	5th
3	Ivana Peters	Shakira	"Nothing Else Matters" / "Whenever, Wherever"	10	6	10	9	0	35	4th
4	Nikola Rokvić	Ewan McGregor	"Moulin Rouge"	9	8	8	10	5	40	3rd
5	Ana Grubin	Nicole Kidman	"Moulin Rouge"	8	12	12	12	15	59	1st (Winner)
6	Bogoljub Mitić Đoša	Jim Broadbent	"Moulin Rouge"	4	7	2	5	5	23	7th
7	Neša Bridžis	Who See	"Đe se kupaš"	12	10	9	7	5	43	2nd
8	Katarina Ostojić Kaya	Halid Bešlić	"Prvi poljubac"	6	3	3	2	5	19	9th
9	Daniel Kajmakoski	Karolina Gočeva	"Više se ne vraćaš"	2	5	6	8	0	21	8th
10	Halid Muslimović	Plavi Orkestar	"Fa, fa, fašista nemoj biti ti"	3	2	5	3	5	18	10th

Bonus points

- Suzana Mančić gave five points to Dara Bubamara
- Dara Bubamara gave five points to Halid Muslimović
- Ivana Peters gave five points to Đoša
- Nikola Rokvić gave five points to Ana Grubin
- Ana Grubin gave five points to Nikola Rokvić
- Đoša gave five points to Ana Grubin
- Neša Bridžis gave five points to Ana Grubin
- Kaya gave five points to Suzana Mančić
- Daniel Kajmakoski gave five points to Neša Bridžis
- Halid Muslimović gave five points to Kaya

== Week 6 ==
Guest Judge: Lepa Brena
Aired: April 10, 2016
Winner: Neša Bridžis

Order	Celebrity	Performing as	Song	Points (judges and contestants)					Total	Result
Order	Celebrity	Performing as	Song	Brena	Vlado	Ivan	Ana	Bonus	Total	Result
1	Katarina Ostojić Kaya	Beyoncé	"Halo" / "Naughty Girl"	10	9	9	9	0	37	3rd
2	Nikola Rokvić	Milan Mladenović	"Samo par godina za nas"	9	7	6	7	0	29	5th
3	Ivana Peters	Aretha Franklin	"Think"	8	10	10	8	0	36	4th
4	Bogoljub Mitić Đoša	Džej	"Rađaj sinove" / "Bato, Bato" / "Nisam ja mali"	5	3	3	2	0	13	10th
5	Dara Bubamara	Lepa Brena	"Rađaj sinove" / "Bato, Bato" / "Nisam ja mali"	6	2	2	6	0	16	8th
6	Neša Bridžis	Justin Timberlake	"My Love" / "SexyBack"	7	8	8	10	35	68	1st (Winner)
7	Halid Muslimović	Timbaland	"My Love" / "SexyBack"	4	5	7	4	0	20	6th
8	Ana Grubin	Icona Pop	"Emergency"	3	4	5	5	0	17	7th
9	Daniel Kajmakoski	Rammstein	"Benzin"	12	12	12	12	15	63	2nd
10	Suzana Mančić	Ana Bekuta	"Kralj ponoći"	2	6	4	3	0	15	9th

Bonus points

- Kaya gave five points to Neša Bridžis
- Nikola Rokvić gave five points to Daniel Kajmakoski
- Ivana Peters gave five points to Daniel Kajmakoski
- Đoša gave five points to Neša Bridžis
- Dara Bubamara gave five points to Neša Bridžis
- Neša Bridžis gave five points to Daniel Kajmakoski
- Halid Muslimović gave five points to Neša Bridžis
- Ana Grubin gave five points to Neša Bridžis
- Daniel Kajmakoski gave five points to Neša Bridžis
- Suzana Mančić gave five points to Neša Bridžis

== Week 7 (Children's Night) ==
Guest Judge: Dejan Tomašević
Aired: April 17, 2016
Winner: Đoša

Order	Celebrity	Performing as	Song	Points (judges and contestants)					Total	Result
Order	Celebrity	Performing as	Song	Dejan	Vlado	Ivan	Ana	Bonus	Total	Result
1	Ivana Peters	Elsa	"Let It Go"	12	12	12	5	0	41	2nd
2	Suzana Mančić	Cinderella	"Sing Sweet Nightingale"	2	5	5	6	0	18	8th
3	Nikola Rokvić	Cinderella	"Sing Sweet Nightingale"	10	8	7	10	0	35	4th
4	Neša Bridžis	Cinderella	"Sing Sweet Nightingale"	7	7	8	9	0	31	6th
5	Bogoljub Mitić Đoša	Matilda	"Revolting Children"	9	6	6	4	35	60	1st (Winner)
6	Daniel Kajmakoski	Justin Bieber	"Love Yourself" / "Sorry"	8	3	10	8	0	29	7th
7	Dara Bubamara	Annie	"Annie"	3	10	4	7	10	34	5th
8	Ana Grubin	Agatha Hannigan	"Annie"	6	9	9	12	0	36	3rd
9	Halid Muslimović	Minja Subota	"Išli smo u Afriku"	4	4	3	3	0	14	10th
10	Katarina Ostojić Kaya	Sebastian	"Under the Sea"	5	2	2	2	5	16	9th

Bonus points

- Ivana Peters gave five points to Kaya
- Suzana Mančić gave five points to Dara Bubamara
- Neša Bridžis gave five points to Đoša
- Nikola Rokvić gave five points to Đoša
- Đoša gave five points to Dara Bubamara
- Daniel Kajmakoski gave five points to Đoša
- Dara Bubamara gave five points to Đoša
- Ana Grubin gave five points to Đoša
- Halid Muslimović gave five points to Đoša
- Kaya gave five points to Đoša

== Week 8 ==
Guest Judge: Nina Seničar
Aired: April 25, 2016
Winner: Dara Bubamara

Order	Celebrity	Performing as	Song	Points (judges and contestants)					Total	Result
Order	Celebrity	Performing as	Song	Nina	Vlado	Ivan	Ana	Bonus	Total	Result
1	Ana Grubin	James Brown	"Papa's Got a Brand New Bag" / "Get Up Offa That Thing" / "I Got You (I Feel Good)"	6	7	10	8	0	31	5th
2	Bogoljub Mitić Đoša	Monty Python	"Always Look on the Bright Side of Life"	3	5	4	2	0	14	10th
3	Katarina Ostojić Kaya	Emeli Sande	"Read All About It"	10	3	9	5	0	27	6th
4	Suzana Mančić	Madonna	"Hollywood" / "Like a Virgin" / "Me Against the Music" / "Je t'aime... moi non plus"	5	2	3	6	5	21	8th
5	Dara Bubamara	Madonna	"Hollywood" / "Like a Virgin" / "Me Against the Music" / "Je t'aime... moi non plus"	2	12	8	9	40	71	1st (Winner)
6	Halid Muslimović	Mile Kitić	"Nema više cile-mile"	4	6	5	4	0	19	9th
7	Nikola Rokvić	Toše Proeski	"Tajno moja" / "Igra bez granica"	12	4	2	3	0	21	8th
8	Neša Bridžis	The Prodigy	"Smack My Bitch Up"	8	10	6	12	5	41	2nd
9	Daniel Kajmakoski	The Prodigy	"Smack My Bitch Up"	9	9	7	10	0	35	3rd
10	Ivana Peters	Hanka Paldum	"Crne kose"	7	8	12	7	0	34	4th

Bonus points

- Ana Grubin gave five points to Dara Bubamara
- Đoša gave five points to Dara Bubamara
- Kaya gave five points to Dara Bubamara
- Suzana Mančić gave five points to Dara Bubamara
- Dara Bubamara gave five points to Suzana Mančić
- Halid Muslimović gave five points to Dara Bubamara
- Nikola Rokvić gave five points to Dara Bubamara
- Neša Bridžis gave five points to Dara Bubamara
- Daniel Kajmakoski gave five points to Neša Bridžis
- Ivana Peters gave five points to Dara Bubamara

== Week 9 ==
Guest Judge: Dragana Mirković
Aired: May 1, 2016
Winner: Suzana Mančić

Order	Celebrity	Performing as	Song	Points (judges and contestants)					Total	Result
Order	Celebrity	Performing as	Song	Dragana	Vlado	Ivan	Ana	Bonus	Total	Result
1	Bogoljub Mitić Đoša	Dragana Mirković	"Opojni su zumbuli" / "Mili, mili"	2	2	3	5	5	17	9th
2	Ivana Peters	Loreen	"We Got the Power" / "My Heart Is Refusing Me" / "Euphoria"	7	10	10	12	0	39	3rd
3	Nikola Rokvić	Miroslav Ilić	"Lažu da vreme leči sve" / "Sistem te laže"	9	9	9	6	0	33	5th
4	Ana Grubin	Beogradski Sindikat	"Lažu da vreme leči sve" / "Sistem te laže"	3	4	4	2	0	13	10th
5	Daniel Kajmakoski	Šaban Šaulić	"Danima te čekam"	6	6	6	7	0	25	6th
6	Halid Muslimović	Bora Đorđević	"Volim, volim, volim, volim žene"	4	3	2	4	5	18	8th
7	Dara Bubamara	Marilyn Manson	"The Beautiful People"	12	8	7	8	0	35	4th
8	Neša Bridžis	S.A.R.S.	"Lutko" / "Perspektiva"	5	5	5	3	0	18	8th
9	Katarina Ostojić Kaya	Nina Simone	"Feeling Good"	8	12	12	10	0	42	2nd
10	Suzana Mančić	Gwen Stefani	"What You Waiting For?"	10	7	8	9	40	74	1st (Winner)

Bonus points

- Đoša gave five points to Suzana Mančić
- Ivana Peters gave five points to Suzana Mančić
- Nikola Rokvić gave five points to Suzana Mančić
- Ana Grubin gave five points to Halid Muslimović
- Daniel Kajmakoski gave five points to Suzana Mančić
- Halid Muslimović gave five points to Suzana Mančić
- Dara Bubamara gave five points to Suzana Mančić
- Neša Bridžis gave five points to Suzana Mančić
- Kaya gave five points to Suzana Mančić
- Suzana Mančić gave five points to Đoša

== Week 10 ==
Guest Judge: Željko Joksimović
Aired: May 8, 2016
Winner: Halid Muslimović

Order	Celebrity	Performing as	Song	Points (judges and contestants)					Total	Result
Order	Celebrity	Performing as	Song	Željko	Vlado	Ivan	Ana	Bonus	Total	Result
1	Ana Grubin	Ariana Grande	"Focus"	7	6	10	7	0	30	4th
2	Katarina Ostojić Kaya	Željko Joksimović	"Nije ljubav stvar"	10	3	5	3	0	21	8th
3	Nikola Rokvić	Christina Aguilera	"Express"	3	4	3	5	0	15	10th
4	Dara Bubamara	Marija Šerifović	"Pametna i luda"	8	9	7	2	0	26	5th
5	Daniel Kajmakoski	Prince	"Purple Rain"	12	12	12	10	5	51	2nd
6	Halid Muslimović	Patrick Swayze	"(I've Had) The Time of My Life (Dirty Dancing Soundtrack)"	5	8	8	12	45	78	1st (Winner)
7	Suzana Mančić	Jennifer Grey	"(I've Had) The Time of My Life (Dirty Dancing Soundtrack)"	4	7	4	6	0	21	8th
8	Neša Bridžis	Stromae	"Tous les mêmes"	6	2	6	9	0	23	6th
9	Ivana Peters	Halid Muslimović	"Oj jarane, jarane"	9	10	9	4	0	32	3rd
10	Bogoljub Mitić Đoša	Luis	"Opa opa"	2	5	2	8	0	17	9th

Bonus points

- All contestants gave five points to Halid Muslimović.
- Halid Muslimović gave five points to Daniel Kajmakoski.

== Week 11 (Semi-final) ==
Guest Judge: Aca Lukas
Aired: May 14, 2016
Winner: Kaya

Order	Celebrity	Performing as	Song	Points (judges and contestants)					Total	Result
Order	Celebrity	Performing as	Song	Aca	Vlado	Ivan	Ana	Bonus	Total	Result
1	Katarina Ostojić Kaya	Adele	"Hello"	12	12	10	10	5	49	1st (Winner) (Finalist)
2	Suzana Mančić	Magnifico	"Pukni zoro" / "Samo malo"	8	5	2	3	5	23	7th (Eliminated)
3	Ivana Peters	Taylor Swift	"Bad Blood"	10	10	12	8	0	40	4th (Finalist)
4	Dara Bubamara	Aca Lukas	"Zapišite mi broj" / "Kafana na Balkanu"	7	3	3	2	5	20	9th (Eliminated)
5	Daniel Kajmakoski	Michael Jackson	"Dirty Diana" / "Thriller"	9	9	8	12	10	48	2nd (Finalist)
6	Ana Grubin	Jelena Rozga	"Ne tiče me se"	6	8	9	9	10	42	3rd (Eliminated)
7	Bogoljub Mitić Đoša	AC/DC	"Thunderstruck"	3	4	4	6	0	17	10th (Eliminated)
8	Halid Muslimović	Nedžad Salković	"Ne klepeći nanulama"	4	6	7	5	0	22	8th (Eliminated)
9	Neša Bridžis	Hair	"Aquarius/Let the Sunshine In (Hair Musical Soundtrack)"	2	2	5	4	15	28	5th (Finalist)
10	Nikola Rokvić	Robbie Williams	"Feel"	5	7	6	7	0	25	6th (Finalist)

Bonus points

- Kaya gave five points to Ana Grubin
- Suzana gave five points to Dara Bubamara
- Ivana Peters gave five points to Neša
- Dara gave five points to Suzana
- Daniel Kajmakoski gave five points to Neša
- Ana Grubin gave five points to Kaya
- Đoša gave five points to Ana Grubin
- Halid Muslimović gave five points to Neša
- Neša gave five points to Ivan
- Nikola Rokvić gave five points to Ivan

== Week 12 (Final) ==
Aired: May 21, 2016
Series winner: Nikola Jakšić

Order	Celebrity	Performing as	Song	Result
1	Ivana Peters	Sia	"Alive"	5th
2	Katarina Ostojić Kaya	Alicia Keys	"Girl on Fire"	4th
3	Neša Bridžis	Pitbull	"Fireball"	3rd
4	Nikola Rokvić	Alen Islamović	"Đurđevdan je, a ja nisam s onom koju volim"	2nd
5	Nikola Jakšić	Måns Zelmerlöw	"Heroes"	Winner
6	Bogoljub Mitić Đoša	Queen Latifah	"Hairspray"	X
6	Željko Šašić	Michelle Pfeiffer	"Hairspray"	X
6	Aleksa Jelić	John Travolta	"Hairspray"	X
6	Marija Kilibarda	Amanda Bynes	"Hairspray"	X
7	Suzana Mančić	Mira Škorić	"Ne računaj na mene"	X
7	Dara Bubamara	Ceca	"Ne računaj na mene"	X
8	Halid Muslimović	Daniel Popović	"Džuli"	X
9	Vlado Georgiev	Tom Jones	"Green Green Grass of Home" / "Help Yourself"	X
10	Ana Grubin	Haddaway	"What Is Love"	X
11	Ana Kokić	Christina Aguilera	"Ain't No Other Man"	X
12	Gru	Eros Ramazzotti	"Più Bella Cosa"	X

== Notes ==
1.After the second episode Slavica Ćukteraš left the show because she became pregnant. Instead, from the fourth episode, the show joined Suzana Mančić, while in the third episode special guest was Milica Pavlović.
2.Đoša and Dara Bubamara performed together.
3.Kaya and Neša Bridžis performed together.
4.Ana Grubin and presenter Marija Kilibarda performed together.
5.Đoša and Dara Bubamara performed together.
6.Ivana Peters and Nikola Rokvić performed together.
7.Ana, Nikola and Đoša performed together.
8.Đoša and Dara Bubamara performed together.
9.Neša Bridžis and Halid Muslimović performed together.
10.Ana Grubin and presenter Marija Kilibarda performed together.
