= Oralno doba =

- Gutović with Ceca on Oralno doba's debut show.
- Starring: Milan Gutović; Jelena Škondrić; Bora Nemić
- Country of origin: Serbia

Production
- Executive producer: Stanko Crnobrnja
- Running time: 45 minutes

Original release
- Network: Fox televizija
- Release: November 19, 2007 – June 2008

Oralno doba (The Oral Age) was a Serbian talk/cabaret show airing nightly on Fox televizija from mid November 2007 until early June 2008. It was hosted by Lane Gutović.

Launched on 19 November 2007, and airing nightly from Monday to Thursday at 10 pm, the show came as replacement to the similarly conceptualized Marko Živić Show that was taken off the network's schedule months earlier. Oralno doba's very first guest was Ceca Ražnatović, followed by Ana Ivanovic later on as part of the same episode but her interview was conducted via satellite.

== History ==
The show's guests covered a wide spectrum: from turbo folk stars (Jelena Karleuša) and retired footballers turned reality television stars (Saša Ćurčić) to individuals from politics and religious life discussing very serious topics and issues (mufti Muamer ef. Zukorlić).

=== Modified format ===
Initially a straight talk show with usually one guest and a single comedy bit called "Pisma uredniku", since 19 January 2008, some two months into its run, Oralno doba went through slight retooling that included the arrival of well-known Serbian TV director Stanko Crnobrnja on board. Simultaneously, the show got more cabaret elements and furthermore its title was modified to Oralno doba - Video cabaret. Also joining the show on this occasion were actors Jelena Škondrić and Bora Nemić who participated in various cabaret sketches with Gutović.

=== Hiatus & cancellation ===
From the beginning of June 2008, the show went on summer hiatus with assumption that it would be returning in the fall. However, on 6 August 2008, Fox televizija announced that Oralno doba will not be included on the network's fall schedule. According to Press daily newspaper's sources, the cancellation was made due to the show's high production costs of €100,000 per month (the host's salary was reportedly €2,000 per show) as compared to its ratings that "weren't terrible, but weren't stellar either as they were barely above Fox televizija's highest rated programme - WWE's Raw and SmackDown brands - that cost the network much less money to put on".

== Reaction and reception ==
While conceding Gutović's glitzy populist approach to hosting managed to infuse some energy into the show, Politika's television critic Branka Otašević felt the problem with Oralno doba "isn't so much its concept, but rather the overambitious decision to make it a daily programme". The imposed frequency of daily airings, she continued, "makes it impossible for the writing staff to come up with enough witty aphorisms, sketches, and one-liners for every show, all of which leads to cranking out banalities garnered with mild wittiness and observations lacking in point". She finally reproached the host for "conducting his interviews in a monotonous manner with stereotypical questions always prefaced with 'You once said in an interview...', 'it was written somewhere...', you once answered...'.

In September 2013 as guest on Veče sa Ivanom Ivanovićem, Gutović talked about his experiences hosting Oralno doba: "Doing that show was very difficult for many reasons. One of the reasons was that I had no say in selection of guests. Another reason was having to pretend I'm having a pleasant time interviewing the guests I didn't want in the first place. And the biggest reason of all was that despite feeling unpleasant about interviewing or even so much as being introduced to a person I didn't want there to begin with, I now had to pretend I'm interested in what he or she has to say". Asked to identify his worst guest, Gutović said "so many of them were horrible, singling one out would be unfair to others" before conceding that Serbia simply doesn't have enough interesting people for a daily show of this nature.
