= Survivor Srbija VIP: Philippines =

- No. of days: 32
- No. of castaways: 16
- Winner: Andrej Maričić
- Location: Caramoan, Philippines
- No. of episodes: 42

Release
- Original release: October 22, 2010 – January 5, 2011

Additional information
- Filming dates: August 1 – September 1, 2010

Season chronology
- ← Previous; Survivor Srbija: Philippines Next → Survivor Srbija VIP: Costa Rica

Survivor Srbija VIP: Philippines is the third season of the Serbian version of the Survivor television series, created by Vision Team production company and broadcast by Prva Srpska Televizija (new name of Fox televizija). This is also the first season of VIP format.

VIP season of Survivor Srbija is an international co-production recorded on the Caramoan Peninsula in the Philippines, as in the second season.

In addition to Serbia, the show was broadcast in Bosnia and Herzegovina (Televizija OBN), Macedonia (Sitel televizija) and Montenegro (TV In). Bosnian, Macedonian and Montenegrin version omitted the word 'Srbija' from the show title - it is titled simply VIP Survivor.

Featuring 16 contestants (8 men and 8 women), broadcast started on October 22, 2010, in Serbia and Bosnia and Herzegovina; in Macedonia on October 24, 2010; in Montenegro on October 25, 2010.

The show is hosted by Andrija Milošević.

Andrej Maričić was named the winner in the final episode on January 5, 2011, defeating Toni "Zen" Petkovski and Katarina Vučetić with a vote of 8-4-2 and he won a prize of €50.000.

== Contestants ==
Contestant	Original tribe^{1}	Swapped tribe	Merged tribe	Finish	Total votes
Nikolija Jovanović; 21, Athens, Greece; Student and photo model	Bahandi			1st Voted Out; Day 4	7
Vesna Zmijanac; 53, Bukulja; Folk singer	Kasuko			2nd Voted Out; 1st Jury member Day 4	7
Biljana Cincarević; 35, Belgrade; Painter	Kasuko			3rd Voted Out; 2nd Jury member Day 7	7
Milan Rus; 33, Belgrade; Ballet dancer	Kasuko			4th Voted Out; 3rd Jury Member; Day 10	6
Marko Bulat; Returned to game from New Kingdom^{4}	Bahandi	Kasuko^{2}		5th Voted Out; Day 13	3
Nenad "Knez" Knežević; 43, Belgrade; Pop singer	Bahandi	Bahandi		6th Voted Out; 4th Jury Member; Day 16	5
Toni "Zen" Petkovski; Returned to game from New Kingdom^{4}	Bahandi	Bahandi		Eliminated in Challenge^{3} Day 17	0
Miloš Vlalukin; 30, Belgrade; Actor	Bahandi	Bahandi		7th Voted Out; 5th Jury Member; Day 19	4
Edin Škorić; 35, Belgrade; Volleyball player	Kasuko	Kasuko	Putong	8th Voted Out; 6th Jury Member; Day 23	6
Nikola Rokvić; 25, Belgrade; Folk and Pop singer	Kasuko	Bahandi	Putong	9th Voted Out; 7th Jury Member; Day 26	6
Nikola Rokvić; 25, Belgrade; Folk and Pop singer	Kasuko	Kasuko^{2}	Putong	9th Voted Out; 7th Jury Member; Day 26	6
Aleksandra Perović; 32, Belgrade; Singer	Kasuko	Kasuko	Putong	10th Voted Out; 8th Jury Member; Day 29	4
Bojana Barović; 27, Los Angeles, United States; Model	Kasuko	Bahandi	Putong	11th Voted Out; 9th Jury Member; Day 29	3
Bojana Barović; 27, Los Angeles, United States; Model	Kasuko	Kasuko^{2}	Putong	11th Voted Out; 9th Jury Member; Day 29	3
Jelena Mrkić; 27, Novi Sad; Singer	Bahandi	Bahandi	Putong	Eliminated in Challenge; 10th Jury Member; Day 32	7
Marko Bulat; 37, Belgrade; Folk singer	Bahandi	Kasuko^{2}	Putong	Eliminated in Challenge; 11th Jury member Day 32	3
Gordana "Goca" Tržan; 36, Belgrade; Singer	Bahandi	Kasuko	Putong	Eliminated in a twist 12th Jury Member^{14}	0
Gordana "Goca" Tržan; 36, Belgrade; Singer	Bahandi	Bahandi^{2}	Putong	Eliminated in a twist 12th Jury Member^{14}	0
Katarina Vučetić; 27, Belgrade; Model	Bahandi	Bahandi	Putong	2nd Runner-up	2
Toni "Zen" Petkovski; 27, Skopje, Macedonia; Rapper	Bahandi	Bahandi	Putong	Runner-up	2
Andrej Maričić; 30, Belgrade; TV host	Kasuko	Kasuko	Putong	Sole Survivor	1

The Total votes is the number of votes a castaway has received during Tribal Councils where the castaway is eligible to be voted out of the game. It does not include the votes received during the final Tribal Council.

^1 On day 1, the castaways were told they would divide into two tribes: woman tribe and man tribe, eight members each. But on day 3 in new swap, castaways divided in new two tribes, but that time each tribe had four women and four men.

^2 On day 11 in new swap, tribe leaders of Bahandi and Kasuko, Marko and Bojana changed their tribes, but they had the opportunity to choose one castaway from their tribe to go with them in new tribe; Marko chose Goca, Bojana chose Nikola. On day 14 in new swap, Bojana and Nikola returned to Kasuko, but because Marko voted out on the last tribal council, only Goca returned to Bahandi.

^3 Toni was eliminated in challenge, he was not voted out regularly at Tribal Council.

^4 Because Toni and Marko were back in merge tribe on day 20, they are listed as having placed in two different points in the game.

== The game ==
Cycles in this article refer to the three-day periods in the game (unless indicated), composed of at least the Immunity Challenge and the subsequent Tribal Council.

Cycle no.	Air dates	Challenges			Exiled	Tribe Leader	Eliminated	Vote	Finish	New Kingdom (Bag'o Ka'harian)	
Cycle no.	Air dates	Reward	Immunity	Special Challenge^{1}	Exiled	Tribe Leader	Eliminated	Vote	Finish	Inhabitants	Challenge
01	October 22, 26 to October 29, 2010	Bahandi	None^{2}	Bojana	None^{3}	Bojana	Nikolija	7-1	1st Voted Out; Day 4	None^{4}	
01	October 22, 26 to October 29, 2010	Bahandi	None^{2}	Marko	None^{3}	Marko	Vesna	7-1	2nd Voted Out; 1st Jury Member; Day 4	None^{4}	
02	November 2 to November 5, 2010	Kasuko	Bahandi	Aleksandra	Bojana	Bojana	Biljana	7-1	3rd Voted Out; 2nd Jury Member; Day 7	Nikolija^{5}	Vesna (0/5 rewards)
02	November 2 to November 5, 2010	Kasuko	Bahandi	Aleksandra	Bojana	Marko	Biljana	7-1	3rd Voted Out; 2nd Jury Member; Day 7	Vesna	Vesna (0/5 rewards)
03	November 9 to November 12, 2010	Kasuko	Bahandi	Edin	Aleksandra	Bojana	Milan	5-0	4th Voted Out; 3rd Jury Member; Day 10	Biljana	Biljana (4/5 rewards)
03	November 9 to November 12, 2010	Kasuko	Bahandi	Edin	Aleksandra	Marko	Milan	5-0	4th Voted Out; 3rd Jury Member; Day 10	Biljana	Biljana (4/5 rewards)
04	November 16 to November 19, 2010	Kasuko	Bahandi	Andrej	Edin	Marko	Marko	3-1	5th Voted Out; Day 13	Milan	Milan (5/5 rewards)
04	November 16 to November 19, 2010	Kasuko	Bahandi	Andrej	Edin	Bojana	Marko	3-1	5th Voted Out; Day 13	Milan	Milan (5/5 rewards)
05	November 23 to November 26, 2010	Bahandi	Kasuko	Toni	Knez	Bojana	Knez	5-0	6th Voted Out; 4th Jury Member; Day 16	Marko	Marko (3/4 rewards)
05	November 23 to November 26, 2010	Bahandi	Kasuko	Toni	Knez	Toni	Knez	5-0	6th Voted Out; 4th Jury Member; Day 16	Marko	Marko (3/4 rewards)
06	November 30 to December 3, 2010	None^{6}	Kasuko	Miloš	Miloš	Bojana	Toni	No vote	Eliminated in challenge Day 17	Knez	Toni (4/4 rewards)
06	November 30 to December 3, 2010	None^{6}	Kasuko	Miloš	Miloš	Miloš	Miloš	3-2	7th Voted Out; 5th Jury Member; Day 19	Toni	Toni (4/4 rewards)
07	December 7 to December 10, 2010	None^{7}	Aleksandra, Andrej, Katarina, Nikola, Toni	Marko	Bojana	None^{8}	Edin	5-4	8th Voted Out; 6th Jury Member; Day 23	Miloš	Toni [Marko]^{9}
08	December 14 to December 17, 2010	Survivor; Auction	Bojana	Katarina	Katarina	None^{8}	Nikola	6-2-2	9th Voted Out; 7th Jury Member; Day 26	None^{10}	
09	December 21 to December 24, 2010	Andrej [Aleksandra]	Toni	None^{11}	Bojana	None^{8}	Aleksandra	4-3-1	10th Voted Out; 8th Jury Member; Day 29	None^{10}	
09	December 21 to December 24, 2010	Andrej [Aleksandra]	Toni	None^{11}	Bojana	None^{8}	Bojana	4-3-1	11th Voted Out; 9th Jury Member; Day 29	None^{10}	
10	December 28 to December 30, 2010	None^{12}		Toni	None^{13}	None^{8}	Jelena	No vote	Eliminated in challenge 10th Jury Member; Day 32	None^{10}	
10	December 28 to December 30, 2010	None^{12}		Andrej	None^{13}	None^{8}	Jelena	No vote	Eliminated in challenge 10th Jury Member; Day 32	None^{10}	
10	December 28 to December 30, 2010	None^{12}		Goca	None^{13}	None^{8}	Marko	No vote	Eliminated in challenge 11th Jury Member; Day 32	None^{10}	
10	December 28 to December 30, 2010	None^{12}		Katarina^{14}	None^{13}	None^{8}	Marko	No vote	Eliminated in challenge 11th Jury Member; Day 32	None^{10}	
-	January 4, 2011	Recap Episode								None^{10}	
Final	January 5, 2011	Jury vote					Goca	8-4-2	12th Jury Member^{14}	None^{10}	
Final	January 5, 2011	Jury vote					Katarina	8-4-2	2nd Runner-Up	None^{10}	
Final	January 5, 2011	Jury vote					Toni	8-4-2	Runner-up	None^{10}	
Final	January 5, 2011	Jury vote					Andrej	8-4-2	Sole Survivor	None^{10}	

In the case of multiple tribes or castaways who win reward or immunity, they are listed in order of finish, or alphabetically where it was a team effort; where one castaway won and invited others, the invitees are in brackets.

^1 First challenge was a "Tribe leader"; there was a two challenges, one for woman and one for man. The winners are tribe leader. Bojana win for woman and Marko win for man. Through cycle 2 to 9 the winner of challenge had the opportunity to choose "Double Vote" or "Black Vote" and at cycle 10 the challenge was "Place in the Final" where the remain castaway compete in 3 final challenges for place in the final.

^2 There was no immunity challenge due to both tribe voted out one castaway from tribe on tribal council.

^3 No one was sent to Exile Island because it was not yet known to the castaways.

^4 New Kingdom was not yet introduced.

^5 Nikolija was evacuated from New Kingdom on day 8, for medical reasons.

^6 There was no reward challenge due to "fake merge", instead that, castaways compete in challenge, where loser must be eliminated. Loser is Toni and he is eliminated. In that challenge Bojana played the Hidden Immunity Idol, so she doesn't compete.

^7 There was no reward challenge because of the merge.

^8 The tribe leader rule was no longer applicable after the tribal merge, as there was only one tribe.

^9 After merge the castaways were told that there were one place in new merge tribe for one voted out player; then voted out castaways compete in challenge, the winner will be back in merge tribe. The winner is Toni and he must to choose one voted out player to join him in new tribe; Toni chose Marko, so merge tribe is complete.

^10 New Kingdom was discontinued after merge.

^11 There was no winner in this challenge because castaways objected to eat in challenge "Survivor kitchen".

^12 This challenges is not active at cycle 17.

^13 The hidden immunity idol was null after day 29, therefore Exile Island was discontinued.

^14 After final challenge Goca became 3rd finalist, so Marko, Jelena and Katarina was eliminated, but on final Tribal council they have a last chance to become 4th finalist. Katarina win in challenge on Tribal council and she became a last finalist.

^14 After final Tribal council the castaways were told that jury will vote live in the final, so there is no vote at final Tribal council. In live show a jury vote for a winner, but finalist with fewest votes became a 12th jury member. That was Goca, with neither vote, and she can vote for a winner.

== Voting history ==
Tribal Council (TC) numbers are almost the same as Cycle numbers as a Tribal Council occurs at the end of each cycle; eliminations that happen outside a Tribal Council do not bear a Tribal Council number, but count towards a cycle. Episode numbers denote the episode(s) when the voting and subsequent revelation of votes and elimination during a Tribal Council took place. They can also denote the episode wherein a contestant officially left the game for any reason.

	Original Tribes				Swapped Tribes			
TC #:	1		2	3	4	5	Challenge	6
Episode #:	5		9	13	17	21	23	25
Eliminated:	Nikolija; 7/8 votes	Vesna; 7/8 votes	Biljana; 7/8 votes	Milan; 5/5 votes	Marko; 3/4 votes	Knez; 5/5 votes	Toni; No vote	Miloš; 3/5 votes
Voter	Vote							
Aleksandra		Vesna	Biljana; Biljana	Milan	Marko			
Andrej		Vesna	Biljana	Milan	Marko			
Bojana		Vesna	Biljana	Milan				
Edin		Vesna	Biljana	Milan	Marko			
Goca	Nikolija				Edin	Knez		Miloš
Jelena	Nikolija					Knez		Miloš
Katarina	Nikolija					Knez		Miloš
Nikola		Vesna	Biljana	Milan				
Miloš	Nikolija					Knez		Katarina; Katarina
Toni	Nikolija					Knez		
Knez	Nikolija							
Marko	Nikolija							
Milan		Vesna	Biljana					
Biljana		Vesna	Milan					
Vesna		Andrej						
Nikolija	Miloš							

	Merged Tribe					
TC #:	7	8	9^{1}		Challenge	
Episode #:	29	33	37		40	
Eliminated:	Edin; 5/9 votes	Nikola; 6/10 votes	Aleksandra; 4/8 votes	Bojana; 3/8 votes	Jelena; No vote	Marko; No vote
Voter	Vote					
Andrej	Jelena	Jelena	Bojana			
Goca	Edin	Nikola	Bojana			
Katarina	Edin	Nikola; Nikola	Aleksandra			
Toni	Edin	Nikola	Bojana			
Marko	Edin	Nikola	Aleksandra			
Jelena	Edin	Nikola	Aleksandra			
Bojana	Jelena	Toni	Aleksandra			
Aleksandra	Jelena	Jelena	Jelena			
Nikola	Jelena	Toni				
Edin						

This castaway could not vote at Tribal Council, because s/he had the "Black Vote necklace".

Jury vote
Finalist:	Goca; 0/14 votes^{14}	Katarina; 2/14 votes	Toni; 4/14 votes	Andrej; 8/14 votes
Juror	Vote			
Public vote^{2}			Toni	Andrej
Goca		Katarina		
Marko			Toni	
Jelena			Toni	
Bojana				Andrej
Aleksandra				Andrej
Nikola				Andrej
Edin				Andrej
Miloš			Toni	
Knez				Andrej
Milan				Andrej
Biljana				Andrej
Vesna		Katarina		

^1 On 9th Tribal Council the castaways voted out two persons, although they vote only one time.

^2 The public from Serbia and from region (Macedonia and Montenegro) was allowed to award a jury vote to one of the finalists. Public from Serbia gave one vote for Andrej and public from region gave one vote for Toni.
