= Skitnica =

Skitnica (Croatian for vagabond) may refer to:

- Skitnica (Šako Polumenta album), 1995
- Skitnica (Marinko Rokvić song), 2003 album by Marinko Rokvić
- "Skitnica" (song), 1984 by Jasna Zlokić
