= Nisam Ljubomoran =

"Nisam Ljubomoran Нисам Љубоморан"
- Nisam Ljubomoran album cover

Single by Vlado Georgiev
- Released: Serbia and Montenegro; 2005
- Recorded: 2005
- Genre: Pop, Latin pop
- Length: 4:48 (Normal version); 4:30 (remix); 5:59 (Extended remix)
- Label: VG ART STUDIO, Barba Studios
- Songwriter(s): Vlado Georgiev
- Producer(s): Vlado Georgiev

Vlado Georgiev singles chronology
"Anđele" (2004)	"Nisam Ljubomoran; Нисам Љубоморан" (2005)	"Hej Ti" (2009)

"Nisam ljubomoran" (in Serbian Cyrillic: Нисам Љубоморан, English: I am not jealous) is a single by the Serbian recording artist Vlado Georgiev released in 2005. Georgiev is the author of the whole song and the song was recorded in his recording studio named 'Barba'.

== Track listings ==
- 1. "Nisam ljubomoran" – 4:48
- 2. "Nisam ljubomoran - remix" – 4:30
- 3. "Nisam ljubomoran - extended remix" – 5:59
