= Marko Živić Show =

Late night talk show

- Starring: Marko Živić
- Country of origin: Serbia

Production
- Running time: 45 minutes

Original release
- Network: Fox televizija
- Release: April 23 – September 1, 2007

Marko Živić Show was a Serbian late-night talk show that aired nightly on Fox televizija for just over four months during 2007.

== Background ==
Produced by Srđan Šaper's Adrenalin production company and launched on 23 April 2007 at 10:30pm, the show featured interviews and comedy bits conducted and performed by host Marko Živić. Visually and conceptually, the programme very much resembled globally popular American shows of the same genre such as The Tonight Show with Jay Leno and Late Night with Conan O'Brien.

The show's launch came as part of the general upgrade in Fox televizija's production capabilities, a network that was itself started only months earlier. The network thus had high hopes for its late night show, and it delivered as it soon became the best rated programme on Fox televizija's entire schedule. Over the coming months, the show continued gaining viewers in the usually slow summer season. In total, 95 episodes of the Marko Živić Show were shot and aired.

== Controversial cancellation ==
Viewers were surprised when the show was taken off the air in early September 2007, a move by Fox televizija that created a minor controversy in Serbian print media. The official statement released by Fox said the cancellation was "a temporary measure that came about through a desire to free up Fox televizija's fall schedule for more movies and series". However, the print outlets very much wondered why would a network that's struggling for viewership be taking its best rated programme off the air. Other Serbian print media outlets speculated that Fox televizija's decision to do so had been forced from the outside due to Živić's occasional political humour. Still, others reported that despite getting good ratings relative to other Fox televizija programmes, Živić's show still couldn't generate enough advertising revenue to justify his €3,000 per month salary - furthermore, according to this source, when he was asked to take a pay cut Živić refused and the show was thus taken off the air.

Despite the network's press statement that described the show's disappearance from its schedule as "temporary", Marko Živić Show never resurfaced over the coming months. Its destiny was finally sealed in mid November 2007 when its timeslot was taken over by a similarly set new talk show Oralno doba.

Živić discussed his 2007 cancellation five years later in December 2012 as guest on Veče sa Ivanom Ivanovićem, one of the shows that succeeded his on the same network and in the very same television studio. Talking to the show's host Ivan Ivanović, Živić said: "Five years ago, it wasn't like it is now. We had many operational problems. The network's CEO back then, Dan Bates, an older American guy, ex-marine turned television executive, was very rigid and didn't have an understanding for some things. You've got a great CEO now, Dejan Jocić, who's a visionary and who supports you and the entire network follows his energy".
