= Toni Zen =

Macedonian rapper and producer

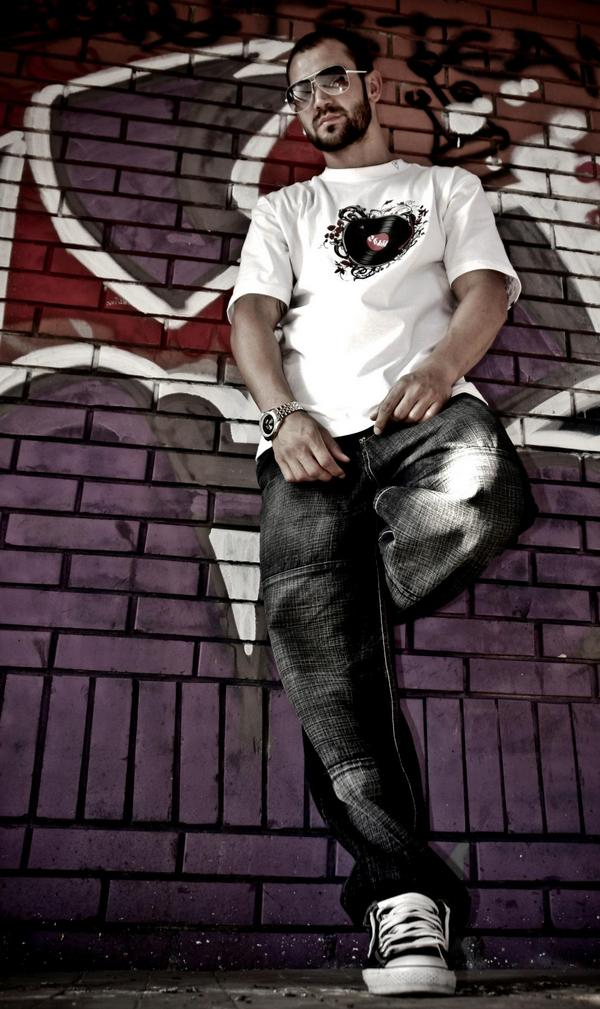

Background information
- Also known as: Toni Zen
- Born: Toni Petkovski; June 21, 1983 (age 43); Skopje, SR Macedonia, SFR Yugoslavia (present-day North Macedonia)
- Genres: Rap
- Occupations: Composer, singer-songwriter
- Years active: 2002–present
- Website: www.tonizen.mk

Toni Petkovski (Macedonian: Тони Зен Петковски), also known as Toni Zen, is a Macedonian rapper and producer. The former member of music band Urbana Dimenzija has been a hip-hop artist for more than 20 years.

== Career ==
=== Beginnings ===
In the late 90s, under the influence of American hip-hop, Toni, using the stage name "Toni Montana", started performing rap music. The first group he was active in was called "105". The group recorded demos played only by a certain hip-hop radio program on Channel 103. In 2002, along with DJ Cvare, he formed the group Urbana Dimenzija. During this time, Toni changed his stage name from Toni Montana to Toni Zen. He performed at numerous events in Macedonia, including the Street Beats Festival and hip-hop night at the Taksirat Festival as the guest of Jeru the Damaja, Afu Ra, Guru and Edo Maajka.

=== Solo career (2005–present) ===
Toni Zen became a solo artist in 2005, working on several projects in close cooperation with Single Mode, Martin Srbinovski, Color and Bisera (Gemini), Tamara Todevska, Robert Bilbilov, Jovan Jovanov, among others. He released three studio albums which featured rap and hip-hop hits including "Vo Poln Efekt", "Skandal", "Mi Casa es Su Casa", and "Vo Moj Stil". In 2010, Toni Zen was an opening act for the concert of world superstar 50 Cent, held in the Boris Trajkovski Sports Center in Skopje. That summer, he held his first concert in Ohrid's Ancient Theatre. Later that summer, he was invited to the Philippines with other ex-Yugoslav celebrities to shoot the third season of the regional version of Survivor called Survivor Srbija VIP: Philippines. He made it to the show's finale, finishing as the first runner-up.

== Discography ==
=== Albums ===
- Stihovna agenda (2005)
- Slushaj (2007)
- Vo moj stil (2009)
- Superzen (2011)
- MikroSkopski organizam (2013)
- Od izvorot na izborot (2019)

=== singles ===
- Prljavo na Balkan

=== Video songs ===
- Zivot (2001)
- Rap fanatik (2001)
- Skopje moj grad (2006)
- Zen Master (2005)
- Vo poln efekt (2003)
- Dali sakas (2008)
- Mi Casa Es Su Casa (2009)
- Скандал
- Во мој стил
- Okey
- Јас сум хип хоп
- Moeto Malo (feat Slatkaristika)2011
- Super Zen (2011)
- Ne Me Zamaraj (2009)
- Nadvor ( Poveke od raper) 2012
- Setila (2013)
- Svetot e tvoj (2013)
- Pod kontrola (2013)
- Isti (2013)
- Prljavo na Balkan (2016)
- SUM (2019)
- Tishina (2019)
