= Melina Džinović =

Serbian fashion designer

Melina Galić
- Melina Galić
- Born: Melina Galić; Bihać, SR Bosnia and Herzegovina, SFR Yugoslavia
- Occupation: Fashion designer
- Known for: "Hamel" label
- Children: 2
- Website: hamel.rs

Melina Galić

Melina Galić, ex Melina Dzinovic, born 1980) is a Bosnian fashion designer based in Serbia known for her womenswear label "Hamel". Her designs often include body hugging statement dresses that have become popular with Hollywood A-listers.

== Background ==
Džinović was born Melina Galić in Bihać, Bosnia-Herzegovina, Yugoslavia to Elma and Sulejman Galić. She grew up in Zagreb, Croatia. In 2014, she married Bosnian singer Haris Džinović and they have two children. They were together for eleven years before getting married. They divorced in 2024. On 18 April 2026, Galić married British businessman Jeffrey Paul Arnold Day in Monaco.

== Career ==
In 2016, Džinović presented her clothing line at a Belgrade fashion show. That same year she made her American debut, showing a collection at FUNKSHION: Fashion Week Miami Beach. In 2016, People Style magazine also named a "Hamel" gown one of the year's "best dresses from the back", meaning the outfit looked good from behind. In 2017, she presented a runway show in São Paulo, where Brazilian Vogue editor Donata Mirales Melina called her "...a super talented designer" and featured her dresses in the magazine. The "Hamel" brand is sold at about 50 locations around the world. In 2018, Džinović's collection was seen at Paris Fashion Week, resulting in 25 additional buyers stocking her clothing line.

With regards to her style, the designer has stated "I always like fringes and see-through fabrics, and I always love the details, so it is difficult for me to make 40 pieces of simple dresses." Although tight-fitting, her outfits are known for covering up figure flaws, as well as being wrinkle free and travel-ready. Džinović's clothes have been worn by Sofía Vergara, Gal Gadot, Mariah Carey, Pamela Anderson, Britney Spears, Ali Larter, and Kate Beckinsale, as well as Jennifer Lopez who ordered several dresses. Džinović has traveled to Los Angeles to do personal fittings for actress Sharon Stone. Local Serbian celebrities like singer Ceca, Kristina Kija Kockar and TV presenter Jovana Joksimović also wear Džinović's "Hamel" label.
