= Marko Bulat (singer) =

Serbian pop-folk singer and musician

Marko Bulat Марко Булат
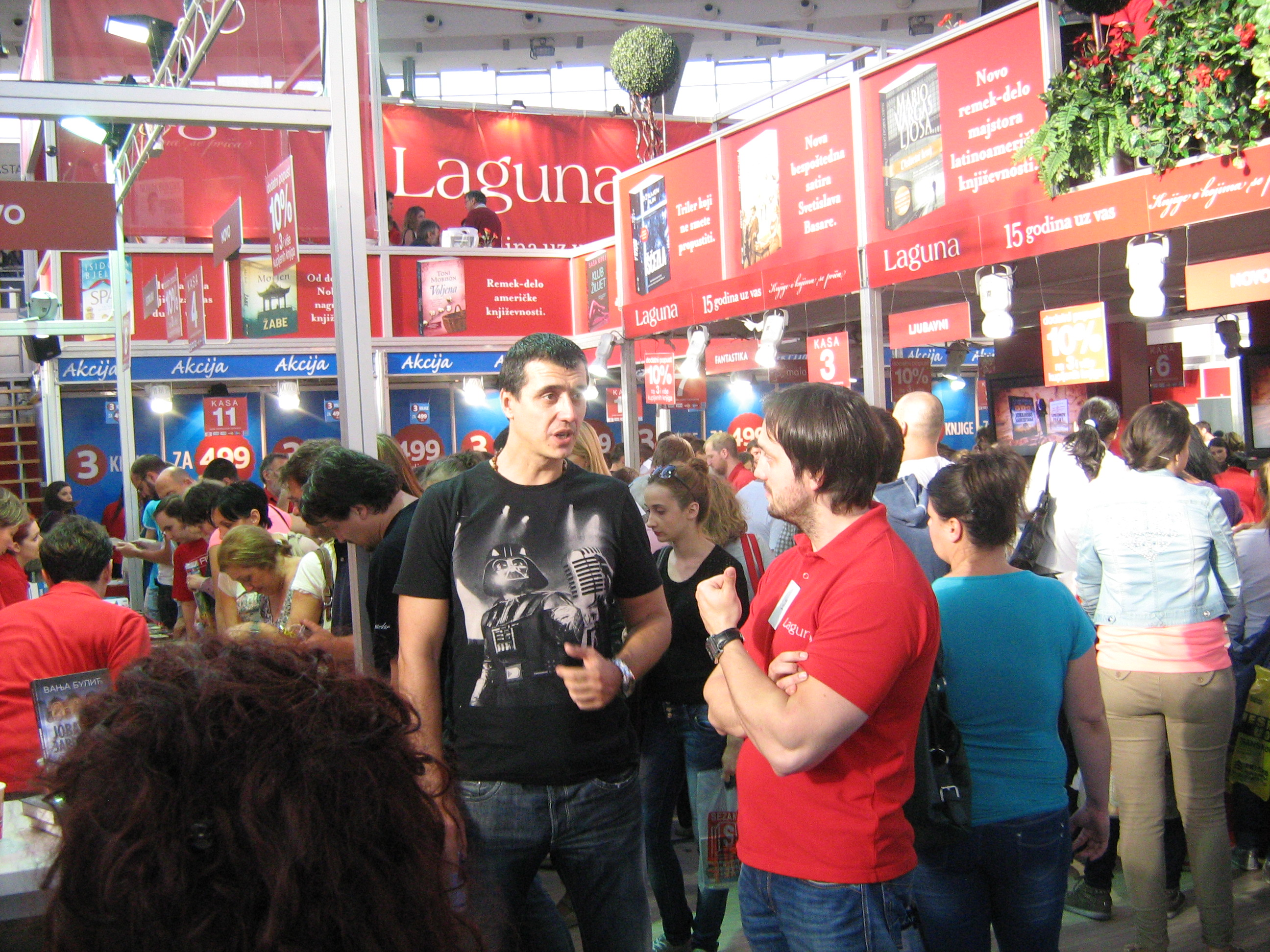
- Bulat at the 2013 Belgrade Book Fair

Background information
- Born: 21 April 1973 (age 51); Smederevo, SR Serbia, SFR Yugoslavia
- Origin: Serbian
- Genres: Pop-folk

Marko Bulat (Serbian Cyrillic: Марко Булат; born 21 April 1973) is a Serbian pop-folk singer and musician.

He has authored popular songs in the vein of Aca Lukas, even performing on the riverboat Lukas. He is very popular among the younger generations, numbering among the most popular local live singers. He has released nine live albums and has plans for two upcoming albums where he will both write lyrics and compose music by himself.

== Discography ==
- Srebrne kiše (1996)
- Dete sreće (1997)
- Prijatelji, braćo, kumovi... (2003)
- Ne postoji sutra (2004)
- Nebeska kafana (2007)
- Dan za dan (2009)
