= Bogoljub Mitić Đoša =

Serbian actor and comedian

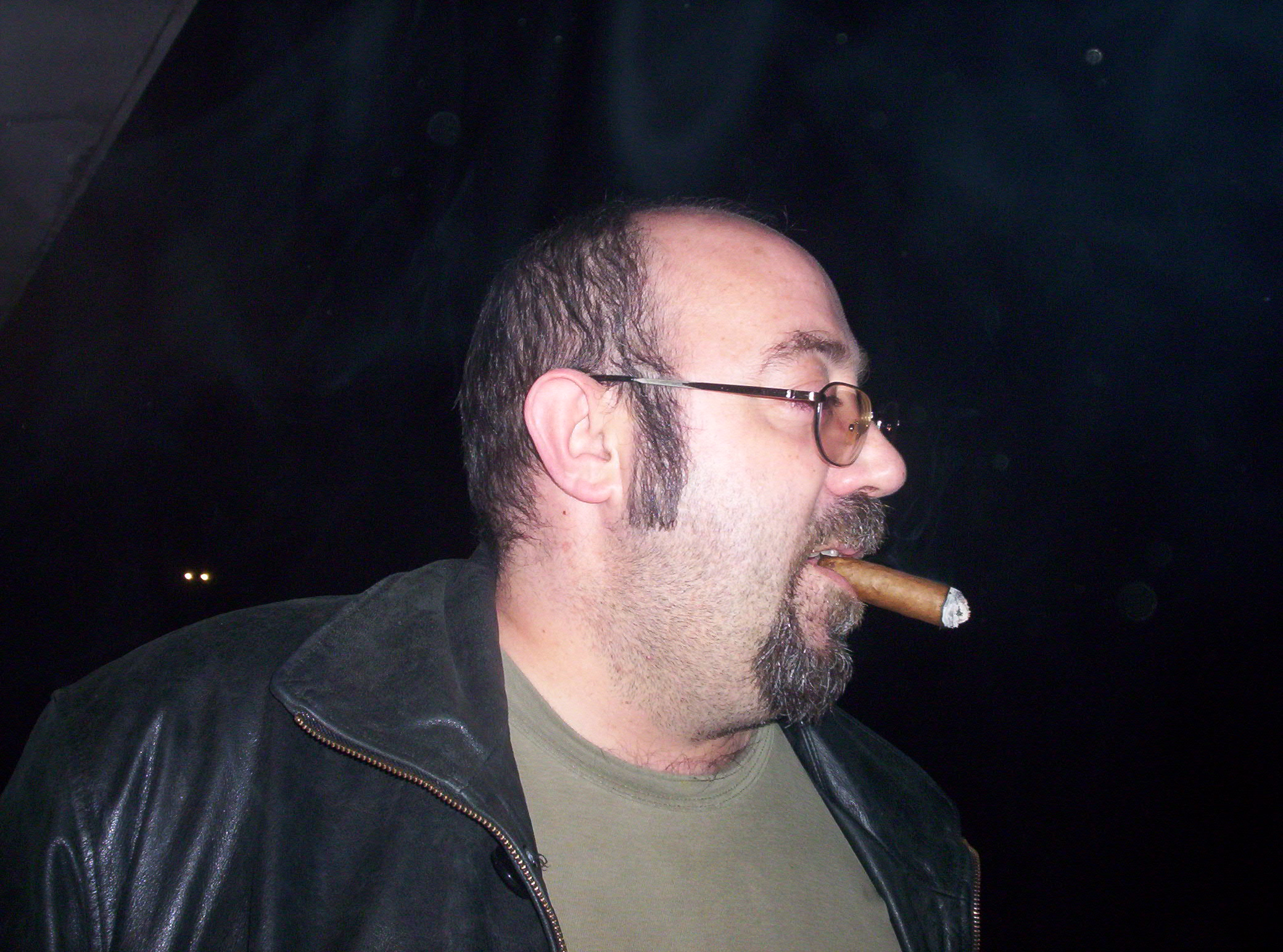
- Mitić in 2006
- Born: 12 January 1968; Vlasotince, SR Serbia, SFR Yugoslavia
- Died: 22 June 2017 (aged 49); Belgrade, Serbia
- Resting place: Vlasotince, Serbia
- Other names: Boge Miza, Bata Djosa
- Occupation: Actor
- Years active: 1990–2017

Bogoljub Mitić (Serbian Cyrillic: Богољуб Митић Ђоша; 12 January 1968 – 22 June 2017) professionally known as Đoša, was a Serbian actor and comedian, best known for his role as Bata Đoša from the Serbian television show Porodično blago which earned him the nickname.

== Early life ==
He was born in Vlasotince, where he lived until he moved to Belgrade. In Vlasotince he was nicknamed Boge Miza.

== Career ==
During his career, which spanned almost three decades, he had done work for theatre and television, but the role that outshined the rest of his profession was the role as Bata Đoša in the 1998 cult TV series "Porodično blago".

Mitić also gained notoriety for being a contestant in the third season of the Serbian version of Your Face Sounds Familiar. He won in the seventh week performing his rendition of the musical Matilda, but finished 10th place overall.

== Death ==
He died of a heart attack on 22 June 2017 in Belgrade. He was buried in Vlasotince.
