= Vlado Georgiev =

Serbian singer-songwriter and producer (born 1976)

Vlado Georgiev Владо Георгиев
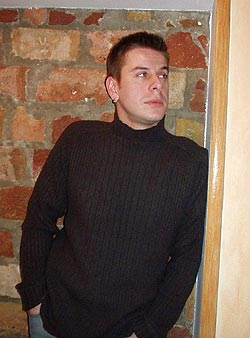
- Georgiev in 2006

Background information
- Born: Vladimir Georgiev; 6 June 1976 (age 50); Dubrovnik, SR Croatia, SFR Yugoslavia
- Origin: Herceg Novi, Montenegro
- Genres: Pop; pop rock
- Occupations: Singer; songwriter; record producer; television judge
- Instruments: Vocals; piano
- Years active: 1996–present
- Labels: Goraton; Barba

Vladimir "Vlado" Georgiev (Serbian: Владимир „Владо” Георгиев, pronounced [vlǎːdo ɡeorɡǐjev]; born 6 June 1976) is a Serbian singer-songwriter and record producer. He has released three studio albums and is known for singles such as "Nisam ljubomoran" (2005).

Georgiev was a judge on the television series Prvi glas Srbije in 2011 and 2012, and Tvoje lice zvuči poznato in 2016. He has been outspoken on political issues, including his opposition to NATO and his support for several conspiracy theories.

== Early life ==
Georgiev was born in Dubrovnik to Dragoljub, a Serbian Bulgarian from Dimitrovgrad, and Borka, a Bosnian Serb from Sarajevo. He has an older brother, Saša. Shortly after his birth, the family moved to Herceg Novi in Montenegro, where he grew up and lived until the age of 16, when he and his brother moved to Belgrade.

== Career ==
Georgiev first played the accordion, then the piano, synthesisers and other keyboards. He began writing songs for himself and for other popular performers in the former Yugoslavia. He also produced for the Montenegrin hip hop group Monteniggers, and recorded the song "Tropski bar" with its member Niggor. He has his own record label, Barba Music, and production company and studio, Studio Barba, in Belgrade.

He has released three studio albums: Navika (Habit) in 2001, Žena bez imena (Woman Without a Name) in 2003 and Daljina (Distance) in 2013. In 2005 he released the hit single "Nisam ljubomoran" ("I'm Not Jealous"). After a two-year break he released the single "Do svitanja" ("Till Dawn") and the ballad "Ti i ja" ("You and I"). In 2009 he released two singles, "Hej ti" ("Hey You"), which became a major hit, and the ballad "Bez tebe" ("Without You").

Georgiev was a judge on the talent show Prvi glas Srbije in 2011 and 2012, and on the third season of Tvoje lice zvuči poznato in 2016.

== Personal life ==
One of his hobbies is riding motorcycles; he has toured Europe on his Harley-Davidson.

== Political views ==
Georgiev previously supported the liberal Movement of Free Citizens. He has voiced support for several conspiracy theories, such as QAnon, and has promoted misinformation about the COVID-19 pandemic and COVID-19 vaccines. In January 2022, reacting to a post by an Australian journalist about Novak Djokovic, he compared the Australian government to Hitler. He has voiced his opposition to NATO.

In January 2025, Georgiev publicly expressed support for the students leading the 2024–2026 Serbian anti-corruption protests.

== Discography ==
=== Albums ===
- Navika (Habit), 2001
- Žena bez imena (Woman Without a Name), 2003
- Daljina (Distance), 2013

=== Singles ===
- "Nisam ljubomoran" ("I'm Not Jealous"), 2005
- "Do svitanja" ("Till Dawn"), 2007
- "Hej ti" ("Hey You"), 2009
- "Iskreno" ("Honestly"), 2014
- "Znam te najbolje" ("I Know You Best"), 2018
- "Tebe žedan" ("Thirsty for You"), 2018

== See also ==
- Music of Serbia
- List of singers from Serbia
- Serbian pop

Awards and achievements
Preceded by Zorana Pavić	Sunčane Skale winner 1998	Succeeded by Tifa & Makadam
New title	Serbian Oscar of Popularity; Male Pop Singer of the Year; 2009	Succeeded by Sergej Ćetković
