= Marko Živić =

Serbian actor (1972–2021)

- Марко Живић
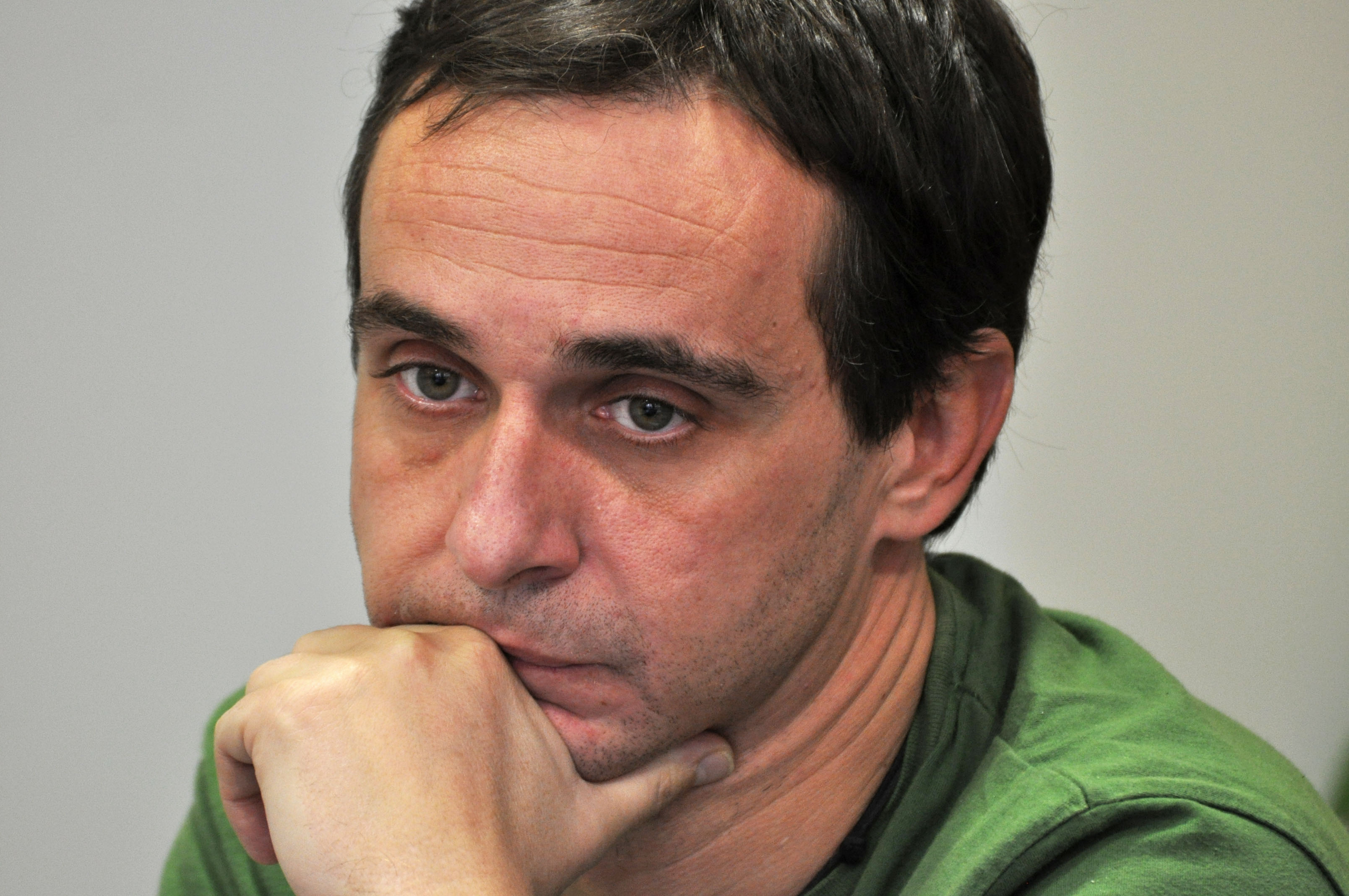
- Born: 4 April 1972; Kruševac, SFR Yugoslavia
- Died: 14 October 2021 (aged 49); Kruševac, Serbia
- Notable work: Lepi Lukić in Folk; Pavle in Kuku Vasa; Vasilije in Shadows over Balkan; Isak in Montevideo, God Bless You!; Papak in Gorki plodovi; Host of Marko Živić Show; Host of Hello Europe

Comedy career
- Years active: 1995–2021
- Medium: Theatre, television, film and stand-up

Marko Živić (4 April 1972 – 14 October 2021) was a Serbian actor and comedian. Dubbed as a great "showman" by media, Živić started his theatre career in 2002 at the Belgrade Drama Theatre. He initially rose to prominence for his role as Lepi Lukić in the televised comedy Folk. His later known portrayals are of good-hearted and vulnerable musician Mika Armonika in Psi laju, vetar nosi and cunning drug dealer Vasilije in Shadows over Balkan. His film credits include Čitulja za Eskobara, The Belgrade Phantom and Montevideo, God Bless You!. Živić also hosted the Marko Živić Show.

== Career ==
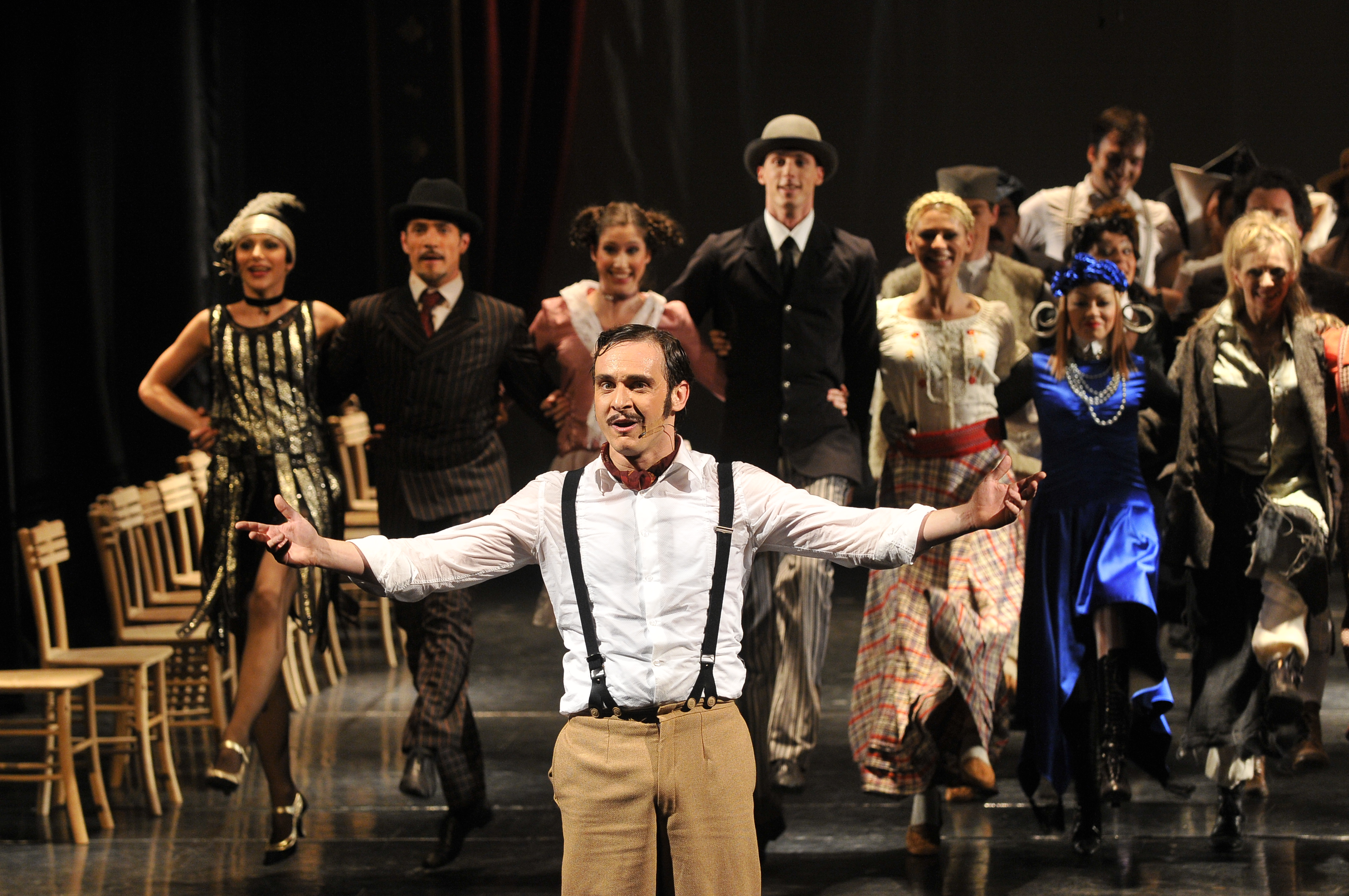
Živić in a 2008 adaptation of The Marathon Family

=== Theatre ===
Marko Živić graduated from the Academy of Dramatic Art in Novi Sad, in the class of Rade Marković. In theatre, Živić is best known for his body of work formed at the Belgrade Drama Theatre drama ensemble, where he was a drama champion.

He has also performed in the Slavija Theatre and the Yugoslav Drama Theatre. In 2020, he starred with Dragan Vujić Vujke and Mladen Andrejević in a rendition of The Green Mile at the Kombak Dvorana, directed by Marko Jovičić. He also actively performed in musicals at the Terazija Theatre.

=== Television ===
On television, he initially gained massive success for his roles in Kuku Vasa and Folk. In 2008, he played Papak in the televised satirical drama Gorki plodovi. He later gained commercial success for his roles as Isak on Montevideo, God Bless You! (2012–2014), Vasilije Trnavac on Shadows over Balkan (2017–2020), Mika in Psi laju, vetar nosi (2017–2021) and Laslo on Žigosani u reketu (2018–2021). He also did recurring roles for Naša mala klinika, Ljubav, navika, panika and The Myth of Sisyphus, the latter alongside Goran Jevtić and Boris Milivojević.

Živić's work as a host includes the brief, but popular Marko Živić Show on TV Fox and the long-running quiz show Hello Europe. In 2017, he performed alongside hosts Dragana Kosjerina and Marija Veljković and actor Gordan Kičić in the RTS show Luda noć.

=== Film ===
He has appeared in over twenty films, including as a leading man in The Belgrade Phantom as Fandjo and Čitulja za Eskobara as Kile. He reprised his role of Isak in the televised series from the critically successful 2012 film release of Montevideo, God Bless You!. In 2010, he starred as Sava Jović in the commercially acclaimed feature films Zduhač and Totalno novi talas.

In 2002, he voiced the title character in the animated Serbian-language series Secret Agent Izzy. In Serbian dubs, he has voiced characters including Baloo in The Jungle Book and the sequel, Homer Simpson in The Simpsons Movie, Morton in Horton Hears a Who!, Louis the Alligator in The Princess and the Frog, Stoick the Vast in the How to Train Your Dragon trilogy, Balthazar in Rango, Rafael in Rio and Rio 2, Nim Galuu in Epic and Jerry Jumbeaux Jr. in Zootopia.

=== Humanitarian work ===
Since 2006, Živić actively participated in numerous humanitarian actions including cases against poverty and discrimination. In November 2014, Živić and Branislav Lečić held charity concerts every Monday in the month for the poor.

== Personal life ==
In 2001, Živić married the Serbian model and television presenter Nataša Stojčević. The couple divorced in 2005.

He died from COVID-19 in Belgrade on 14 October 2021, at the age of 49, during the COVID-19 pandemic in Serbia.
