= Nikola Rokvić =

Serbian singer (born 1985)

Nikola Rokvić Никола Роквић
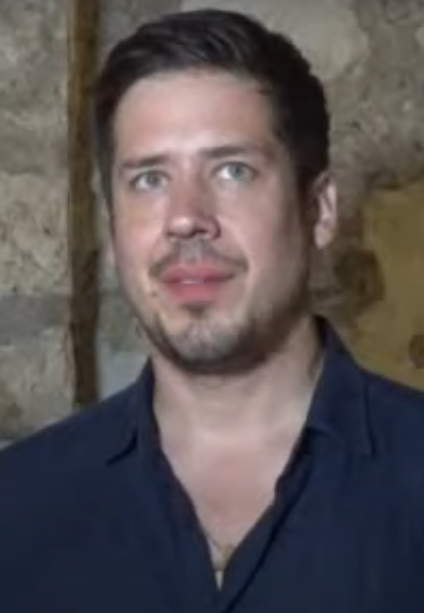

Background information
- Born: 29 June 1985 (age 41); Belgrade, SR Serbia, SFR Yugoslavia
- Genres: Pop-folk; pop
- Occupation: Singer
- Years active: 2006–present
- Labels: Grand; City Records

Nikola Rokvić (Serbian: Никола Роквић; born 29 June 1985) is a Serbian singer and entrepreneur. The oldest son of folk singer Marinko Rokvić, he also became a well-known artist upon the release of his 2006 debut album, titled Oprosti mojoj mladosti. Despite being known primarily for performing turbo-folk music, Rokvić also ventured into pop since the release of Ovaj put in 2015.

== Biography ==
Apart from his musical career, Rokvić also participated on the reality television shows Survivor Srbija VIP: Philippines (2010) and the third season of Tvoje lice zvuči poznato (2016). He is also the co-founder and CEO of the first Serbian streaming platform, called YouBox.

During his time in the Philippines, Rokvić developed an on-screen romantic relationship with fellow contestant, Serbian-American model Bojana Barović. The couple eventually married in 2016 and has four children.

== Discography ==
Studio albums

- Oprosti mojoj mladosti (2006)
- Prećuti me (2008)
- Ovaj put (2015)

== Filmography ==
Filmography of Nikola Rokvić
Year	Title	Genre	Role	Notes
2010	Survivor Srbija	Television	Himself	VIP Season: Philippines, 9th place
2016	Tvoje lice zvuči poznato	Television	Himself	Season 3, 2nd place
