= Šaban Šaulić =

Serbian folk singer (1951–2019)

- Шабан Шаулић
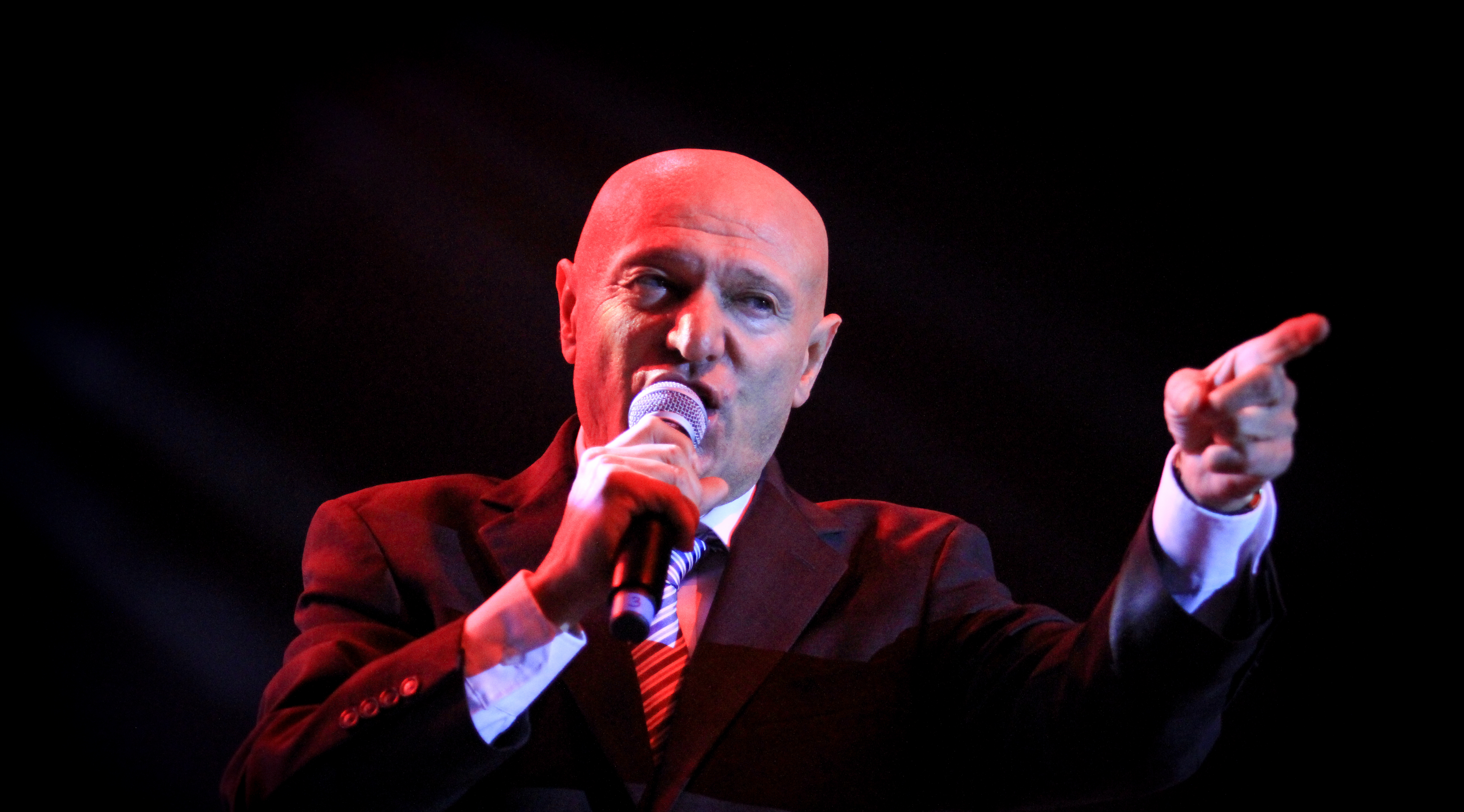
- Šaulić performing in Sofia in March 2016.
- Born: 6 September 1951; Šabac, PR Serbia, FPR Yugoslavia
- Died: 17 February 2019 (aged 67); Bielefeld, North Rhine-Westphalia, Germany
- Occupation: Singer
- Years active: 1969–2019
- Spouse: Gordana Dragaš (m. 1974–2019)
- Children: 4
- Parents: Huso Šaulić (father); Ilduza Demirović (mother)
- Musical career
- Genre: Serbian folk music
- Instrument: Vocals
- Labels: PGP RTB; PGP RTS; Jugodisk; ZaM; Grand Production; Diskos

Šaban Šaulić (Serbian Cyrillic: Шабан Шаулић; 6 September 1951 – 17 February 2019) was a Serbian and Yugoslav folk singer. Renowned for his refined baritone vocals and performances characterised by emotional intensity and crowd interaction, his career spanning over five decades has enjoyed both critical and commercial success. He is referred to as the "King of Folk Music" ("kralj narodne muzike").

== Early life ==
Šaulić was born on 6 September 1951 in Šabac, PR Serbia, FPR Yugoslavia to Bosniak parents Huso Šaulić and Ilduza (née Demirović). His mother Ilduza was originally from Bijeljina, Bosnia and Herzegovina where he spent his childhood. Šaban had a sister, Sarajka (died 24 August 2024, aged 76), who took care of him growing up, and a half-sister from his father's previous relationship.

Šaulić initially showed an interest and affinity for football. It was his uncle, Alija, however, who first noticed that his nephew's true talent laid in music. In the mid-1960s, Alija asked his nephew to sing at their local kafana, which marked the start of Šaulić's five decade long musical career.

== Career ==
In 1969, at the age of 18, Šaulić recorded his first single Dajte mi utjehu ("Give me Solace"). The song became an instant hit and led Šaulić to relocate to Belgrade, Serbia so that he could continue working on what was promising to be a successful career. By the mid-70s, Šaulić had become a household name and his songs were much requested in kafane.

Šaulić was also a judge on the televised singing competition Zvezde Granda between 2013 and 2016, and the televised singing competition "Pinkove zvezde" in 2016–2017 season.

== Discography ==
=== Studio albums ===
- Dajte mi utjehu (1969)
- Bio sam pijanac (1972)
- Tužno vetri gorom viju (1974)
- Ne pitaj me kako mi je druže (1975)
- Gore pisma svedoci ljubavi (1976)
- Dođi da ostarimo zajedno (1978)
- Dva galeba bela (1979)
- Ponovo smo na početku sreće (1980)
- Meni je s tobom sreća obećana (1981)
- Sve sam s' tobom izgubio (1982)
- Tebi ne mogu da kažem ne (1984)
- Kafanska noć (1985)
- Kad bi čaša znala (1986)
- Biseri Narodne Muzike (1986)
- Kralj boema veruje u ljubav (1987)
- Samo za nju (1988)
- Ljubav je velika tajna (1988)
- Ljubav je pesma i mnogo više (1989)
- Pomozi mi, druže, pomozi mi, brate (1990)
- Anđeoska vrata (1992)
- Ljubavna drama (1994)
- Volim da volim (1995)
- Tebi koja si otišla (1996)
- Od srca (1996)
- Ljubav je slatka robija (1997)
- Tebe da zaboravim (1998)
- Za novi milenijum (2000)
- Nema ništa, majko, od tvoga veselja (2001)
- Kralj i sluga (2002)
- Šadrvani (2003)
- Album 2004 (hitovi + 2 nove pjesme: "Postelja" i "Sa njom sve") (2004)
- Telo uz telo (2005)
- Bogati siromah (2006)
- Milicu Stojan voleo (2008)

=== Compilation albums ===
- Balade
- Najlepše pesme

== Personal life ==
From a brief relationship/encounter with Nevenka "Nena" Prodanović, Šaulić had a child in 1969. Born out of wedlock, their son Robert—whom Šaulić had acknowledged paternity of and reportedly provided financial support for, along with some limited participation in his parenting—was reportedly mostly raised by Prodanović's neighbours and extended family in Zrenjanin. Prodanović—herself in and out of infant Robert's life due to moving to West Germany as part of the gastarbeiter program—eventually married; at some future point, young Robert took his stepfather's last name, Omaljev.

In 1974, Šaulić married Gordana Dragaš (b. 1958). The couple briefly separated in 1985, a short period during which Šaulić wrote and dedicated the song "Gordana" to her. The two reconciled just 20 days later. Together, they had three children; a son, Mihajlo, and two daughters, Sanela and Ilda. Ilda is also a singer.

Šaulić's father died unexpectedly during Šaban's concert tour in Australia. He was not able to attend his father's funeral which was held the very next day. Šaulić would often express how he would never be able to come to terms with the fact that he was not in attendance.

=== Death ===
In the early morning hours of 17 February 2019, following a concert the night before in Bielefeld, Germany, Šaulić was on his way home, being driven to the Düsseldorf Airport for a flight back to Belgrade. Boban Stojadinović—Šaulić's close friend and best man at his wedding—was a fellow passenger in the back seat of the car driven by the singer's keyboardist, Mirsad Kerić, who had accompanied him to the concert.

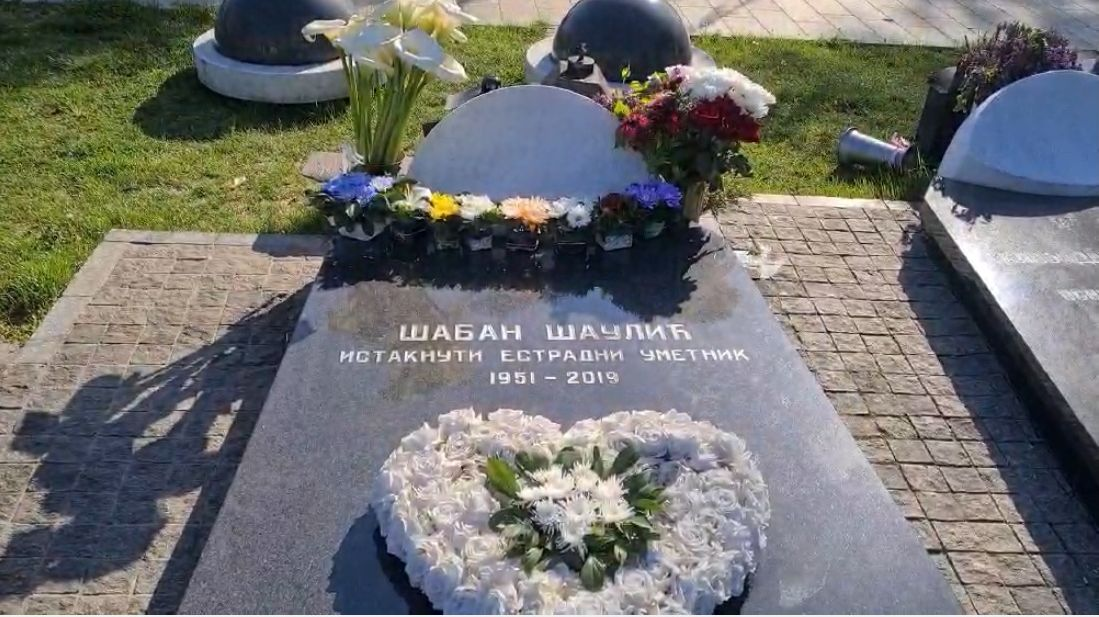
The grave of Šaban Šaulić in Belgrade

At approximately 06:50 am, on the Bundesautobahn 2 between Bielefeld and Gütersloh, the SEAT Ibiza with Šaulić in the passenger seat was violently struck from behind by a Mazda vehicle driven by a drunk driver without a driver's license, causing serious injuries to the three individuals in it. All three were rushed to the hospital, where Šaulić and Kerić were later pronounced dead.

The news of Šaulić's death was met with widespread shock and sorrow from his colleagues and fans. He was buried on 22 February 2019 in the Alley of Distinguished Citizens at the Belgrade New Cemetery.

In February 2020, Šaulić was posthumously awarded the Republic of Serbia's Golden Medal for Merits.

Due to Šaulić's public profile and popularity, the circumstances of his death in Germany became a big story in his home country Serbia, as well as the rest of the countries formerly a part of Yugoslavia, with the driver that caused the deadly accident quickly identified in the Serbian media as a German national of Turkish origin and no fixed address, along with his identifying information published—including his name, age, and social media photos. The German authorities placed the perpetrator in an 11-week detention awaiting trial on four separate charges: two counts of involuntary negligent manslaughter, one count of negligently causing severe bodily harm, drunk driving with traces of cannabis in his system, and driving without a license. Assessed by a German judge not to be a flight risk, the accused was released from detention at the expiration of 11 weeks.

The trial that kept getting postponed due to the COVID-19 pandemic was finally held in January 2022, almost three years after the deadly incident. As part of the expert analysis during the trial, it was determined that the accused was driving at the speed in the 156-193 km/h range (on the road with an 80 km/h speed limit) when he made impact with the car Šaulić was in that had been moving at the speed of 72-92km/h. The accused received a 3 year and 3 month sentence. On appeal, in October 2022, his sentence was reduced by 3 months—to 3 years.

== See also ==
- Music of Serbia
- List of singers from Serbia
- Serbian folk music
