= Minja Subota =

Serbian composer

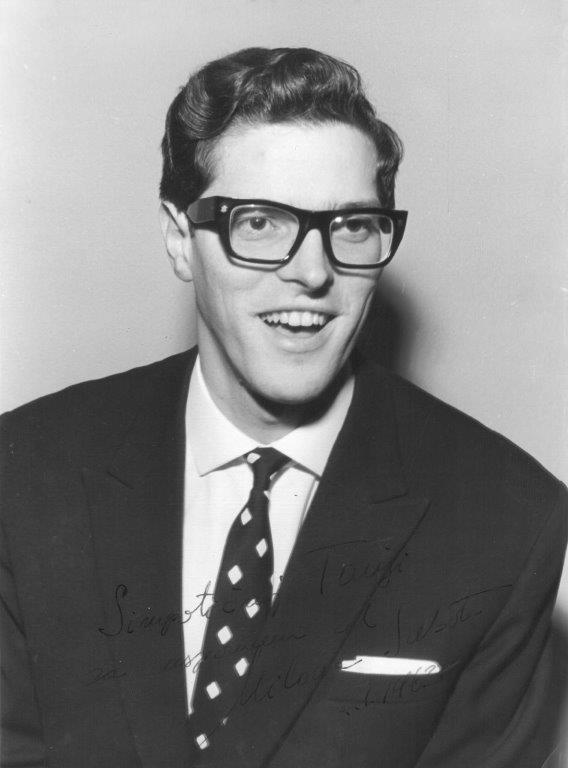
- Subota in 1963
- Born: 8 November 1938; Sarajevo, Kingdom of Yugoslavia
- Died: 17 September 2021 (aged 82); Belgrade, Serbia

Milan "Minja" Subota (Serbian Cyrillic: Милан "Миња" Субота, pronounced [mǐlan mîɲa sǔbɔta]; 8 November 1938 – 17 September 2021) was a Serbian-Yugoslavian composer, musician, entertainer and photographer, born in Sarajevo. He was the host of the long-running children's TV show Muzički tobogan on RTS (formerly on TV Novi Sad). In 2021, he was awarded the Order of Karađorđe's Star.

== Discography ==
=== Albums ===
==== Pop music albums ====
- Milan Subota (Melodiya, USSR D28485–6)
- Budi dobar prema njoj

==== Children's music albums ====
- Minja Subota and Ljubivoje Ršumović: Minja i Ršum (PGP RTB LP 66 6111)
- Pesme za decu (PGP RTB 2140322 STEREO)
- Dragan Laković and Minja Subota: Najlepše dečje pesme (PGP RTB 2140527)
- Minja Subota and Zlata Petković: Plavi čuperak (PGP RTB LP 6123 STEREO)
- Pesme iz Muzičkog tobogana (PGP RTB 2140470 STEREO)
- Deca su ukras sveta (PGP RTS CD 450082 STEREO)

=== EPs ===
==== Pop music EPs ====
- Milan Subota (Jugoton – EPY 3229)
- Milan Subota (PGP RTB EP 50217)
- Milan Subota (PGP RTB EP 50215)
- Milan Subota (PGP RTB EP 50216)
- Milan Subota (PGP RTB EP 50317)
- Lola Jovanović i Milan Subota (PGP RTB EP 50332)

==== Children's music EPs ====
- Telefonijada (PGP RTB EP 61042)
- Minja Subota and Kolibri Choir: Ečke tečke (PGP RTB EP 61047)
- Šansone (PGP RTB EP 50 394)
- One i oni – Aždaja svome čedu tepa (PGP RTB EP – 61043)

== Books ==
- "Kako smo zabavljali Tita"
