= Haris Džinović =

Bosnian folk singer (born 1951)

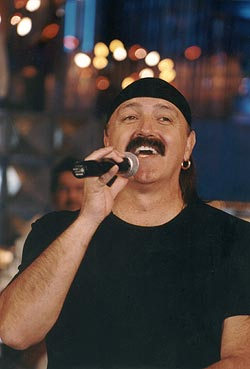
- Džinović performing in 2008

Background information
- Born: 26 September 1951 (age 74); Sarajevo, PR Bosnia and Herzegovina, FPR Yugoslavia
- Genres: Folk, pop-folk
- Occupation: Singer
- Instrument: Vocals
- Years active: 1981–present
- Labels: PGP-RTB, Jugodisk, PGP-RTS, Grand Production, Diskoton, Jugoton

Haris Džinović (born 26 September 1951) is a Bosnian folk singer, composer and lyricist.

== Career ==
Džinović is one of the best known singers of Southeastern Europe, having been active on the music scene since 1981, when he founded his own group Sar e Roma, with which he recorded three albums from 1982 to 1985. He has been a solo singer since 1989.

== Discography ==
=== Sar e Roma ===
- Kao Cigani (1982)
- Kiko, Kiko (1983)
- Romske pjesme/Gypsy Songs (1985)

=== Solo ===
- Ostaricu necu znati (1989)
- Poznaces me (1991)
- Jesul' dunje procvale (1996)
- Haris Džinović (2000)
- Magic (2009)
- Haris (2017)
