= Marinko Rokvić =

Serb folk singer (1954–2021)

Marinko Rokvić Маринко Роквић
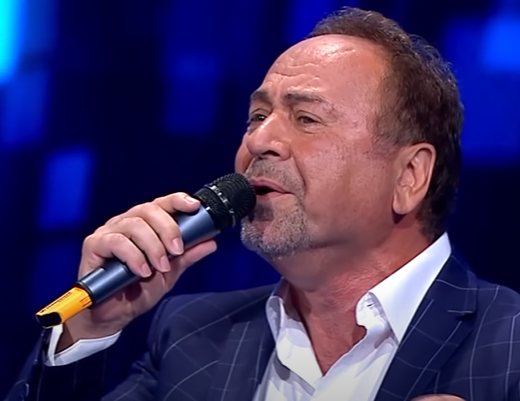
- Rokvić performing in 2018

Background information
- Born: 27 January 1954; Bosanski Petrovac, PR Bosnia and Herzegovina, FPR Yugoslavia
- Died: 6 November 2021 (aged 67) Belgrade, Serbia
- Genres: Folk
- Occupation: Singer
- Years active: 1974–2021
- Labels: PGP-RTS; Diskoton; Grand

Marinko Rokvić (Serbian Cyrillic: Маринко Роквић; 27 January 1954 – 6 November 2021) was a Bosnian Serb folk singer.

== Early life ==
Marinko Rokvić was born on January 27, 1954, in Bosanski Petrovac, PR Bosnia and Herzegovina, FPR Yugoslavia (modern-day Bosnia and Herzegovina). He was raised in an ethnic Serb agricultural family in the village of Kolunić. His affinity for music was demonstrated from an early age through his accordion playing. Rokvić eventually relocated to Belgrade to attend the Electrical Engineering High School "Nikola Tesla".

== Career ==
He started performing in kafanas after graduating from high school and released his debut record in 1974. However, Rokvić rose to prominence three years later upon his first appearance at the Ilidža Folk Music Festival. His debut album, titled Ruža, was released in 1981 under PGP-RTB. Over the years he became one of the most popular Serbian folk singers. His 1983 release, Da volim drugu ne mogu, was sold in around 600,000 copies. The following year he also made a cameo in the popular television series Kamiondžije ponovo voze.

Marinko Rokvić released in total twenty one studio albums and had numerous hit-songs, including Skitnica, Svađalice moja mala, Potražiću oči zelenije, Zanela me svetla velikog grada, Polomio vetar grane, Da volim drugu ne mogu, Jedina moja, Ti za ljubav nisi rođena, Ljubav stara srce para and Tri u jednoj. In 1993, he won the "Zlatni Melos" award and also received the Life Achievement Award in 2019 from the Union of Serbia's Music Artists.

== Personal life ==
He met his wife Slavica in her native Zagreb in 1984 and they married in January next year. The couple had two sons, Nikola and Marko Rokvić, who are also well-known singers. Rokvić also had a third son, named Dario, from a different relationship.

On November 6, 2021, Rokvić died from pancreatic cancer at 67 years of age.

== Discography ==
Studio albums

- Ruža (1981)
- Prva ljubav (1982)
- Da volim drugu ne mogu (1983)
- Kako da dođem na svadbu tvoju (1984)
- Samo me potrazi (1985)
- Podeli sa mnom dobro i zlo (1986)
- Zena za sva vremena (1987)
- U tebi ljubav buducu vidim (1987)
- Ljubav stara srce para (1988)
- Zivela ti meni (1989)
- Sevdalinke (1989)
- Posle tebe (1992)
- Nismo mi anđeli (1994)
- Zbogom ženo, nevernice lepa (1995)
- Što nisi tuđa (1996)
- Sunce i zora (1998)
- Rođena si da bi bila moja (2000)
- Pravo na ljubav (2001)
- Skitnica (2003)
- Gatara (2008)
