= Serbia in the Eurovision Song Contest 2026 =

- Eurovision Song Contest 2026
- Participating broadcaster: Radio Television of Serbia (RTS)
- Country: Serbia
- Selection process: Pesma za Evroviziju '26
- Selection date: 28 February 2026

Competing entry
- Song: "Kraj mene"
- Artist: Lavina
- Songwriters: Andrija Cvetanović; Bojan Ilić; Ivan Jegdić; Luka Aranđelović; Nikola Petrović; Pavle Aranđelović; Pavle Samardžić

Placement
- Semi-final result: Qualified (5th, 187 points)
- Final result: 17th, 90 points

Participation chronology

Serbia was represented at the Eurovision Song Contest 2026 by the song "Kraj mene", written by members of the band Lavina, namely Andrija Cvetanović, Bojan Ilić, Luka Aranđelović, Nikola Petrović, Pavle Aranđelović and Pavle Samardžić, alongside Ivan Jegdić, and performed by Lavina. The Serbian participating broadcaster, Radio Television of Serbia (RTS), organised the national final Pesma za Evroviziju '26 in order to select its entry for the contest.

== Background ==
Prior to the 2026 contest, Radio Television of Serbia (RTS) has participated in the Eurovision Song Contest representing Serbia seventeen times since its first entry in 2007, winning the contest with its debut entry "Molitva" performed by Marija Šerifović. Since then, 13 out of the 17 total Serbian entries have featured in the final with RTS failing to qualify in 2009, 2013, 2017, and most recently in 2025, when "Mila" performed by Princ placed 14th in its semi-final, Serbia's worst result to date.

As part of its duties as participating broadcaster, RTS organises the selection of its entry in the Eurovision Song Contest and broadcasts the event in the country. The broadcaster has used both internal selections and national finals to determine its entries throughout the years. Between 2007 and 2009, RTS used the Beovizija national final, but after its 2009 entry failed to qualify to the final, the broadcaster shifted its selection strategy to selecting specific composers to create songs for artists. After a successful internal selection in 2012, in 2013 RTS returned to an open national final format, titled Beosong, but it failed to qualify to the final. After reverting to internal selection in 2016 and 2017, it returned to use the Beovizija national final between 2018 and 2020, managing to qualify to the final in both 2018 and 2019, with Eurovision having been cancelled in 2020. In 2022, RTS returned to organising a national final under the name Pesma za Evroviziju '22, with this format being used every year since.

On 27 May 2025, RTS confirmed its commitment to not withdraw from the contest. On 15 September 2025, RTS announced its intention to select its entry through Pesma za Evroviziju '26.

== Before Eurovision ==
=== Pesma za Evroviziju '26 ===
The fifth edition of Pesma za Evroviziju was organised by RTS in order to select its entry in the Eurovision Song Contest 2026. It marked the first edition of the format without the involvement of Olivera Kovačević, who was removed from the role of supervisor after she allowed participants of the 2025 edition to make statements supporting the Serbian anti-corruption protests during the shows; she was replaced by Uroš Marković.

==== Semi-finals ====
- The first semi-final took place on 24 February 2026. "Unseen" performed by Lores, "Jugoslavija" performed by Zejna, "Srušio si sve" performed by Yanx, "Zavoli me" performed by Ana Mašulović, "Sve je u redu" performed by Kosmos trip, "Omaja" performed by Mirna and "Otkrivam sebe" performed by Iva Grujin advanced to the final, while "Klaber" performed by Eegor, "Daj nam svet" performed by Makao, "Svaki dan" performed by Manivi, "Trampolina" performed by Bella and "Moma mala" performed by Đurđica were eliminated from the contest.
- The second semi-final took place on 26 February 2026. "Metar sreće" performed by Geminni, "Fräulein" performed by Brat Pelin, "Čairi" performed by Zona, "Veruj" performed by Lu-Ka, "Kraj mene" performed by Lavina, "Adrenalin" performed by Jack Lupino and "Bom bom" performed by Harem Girls and Ivana advanced to the final, while "Sudbina" performed by Aleksandar, "Svima vama treba mama" performed by Milica Burazer, "Ko me proba" performed by Sanja Aleksić, "Jabuka" performed by Avgust and "Kule" performed by Aleksandra Sekulić were eliminated from the contest.

==== Final ====
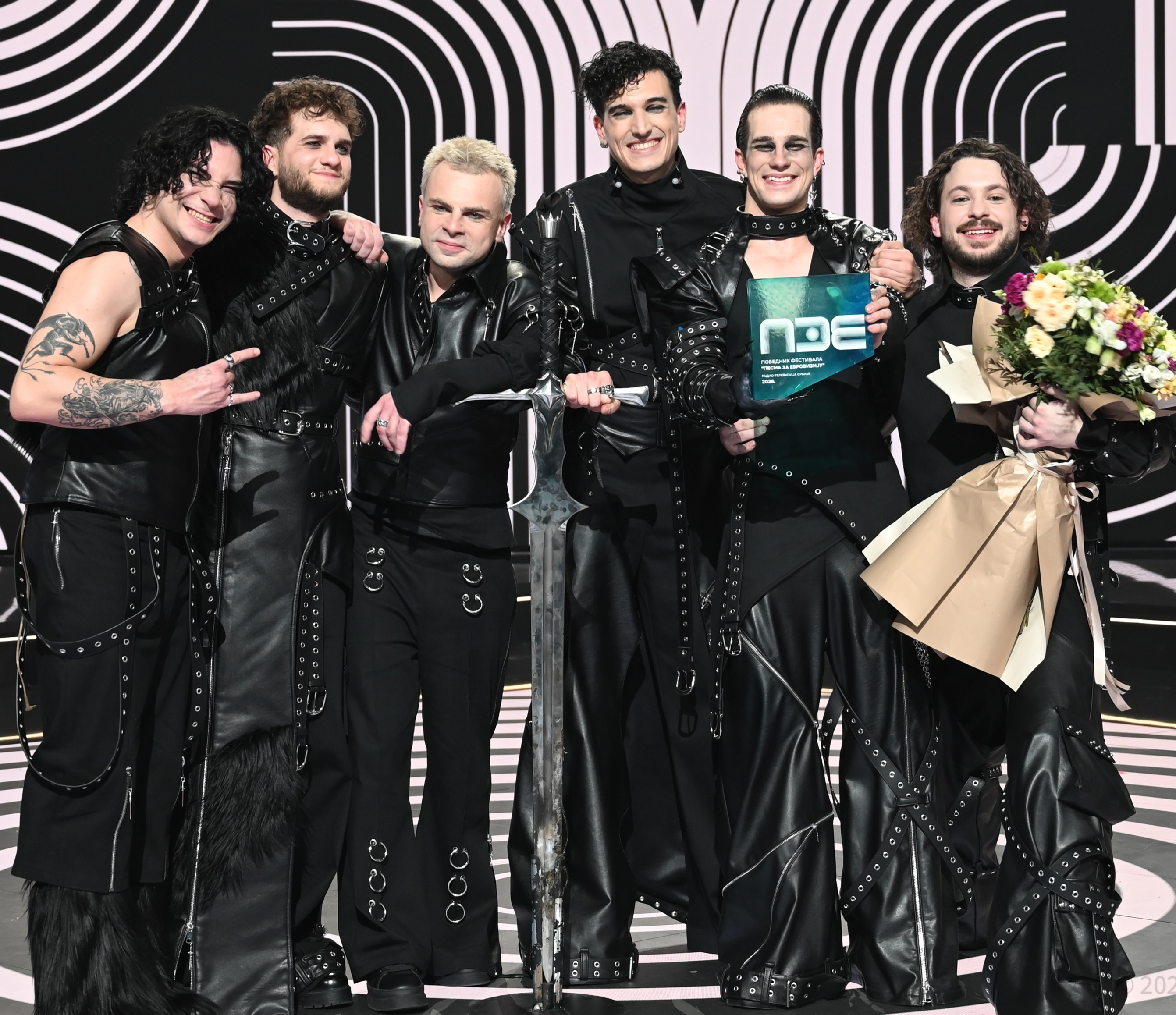
Lavina, the winners of Pesma za Evroviziju '26, posing for the reporters following their win

The final took place on 28 February 2026. The winner was selected based on the 50/50 combination of votes from five jurors and from a public televote. The winner was "Kraj mene", written by members of Lavina, Andrija Cvetanović, Bojan Ilić, Luka Aranđelović, Nikola Petrović, Pavle Aranđelović and Pavle Samardžić alongside Ivan Jegdić, and performed by Lavina.

Final – 28 February 2026
R/O	Artist	Song	Jury	Televote	Total	Place
1	Brat Pelin	"Fräulein"	4	10	14	4
2	Lores	"Unseen"	6	2	8	6
3	Jack Lupino	"Adrenalin"	0	1	1	13
4	Ana Mašulović	"Zavoli me"	2	0	2	12
5	Harem Girls and Ivana	"Bom bom"	7	8	15	3
6	Iva Grujin	"Otkrivam sebe"	0	4	4	10
7	Kosmos trip	"Sve je u redu"	0	5	5	8
8	Zejna	"Jugoslavija"	10	6	16	2
9	Geminni	"Metar sreće"	0	3	3	11
10	Lu-Ka	"Veruj"	5	0	5	9
11	Lavina	"Kraj mene"	12	12	24	1
12	Yanx	"Srušio si sve"	8	0	8	7
13	Zona	"Čairi"	3	7	10	5
14	Mirna	"Omaja"	1	0	1	14

=== Promotion ===
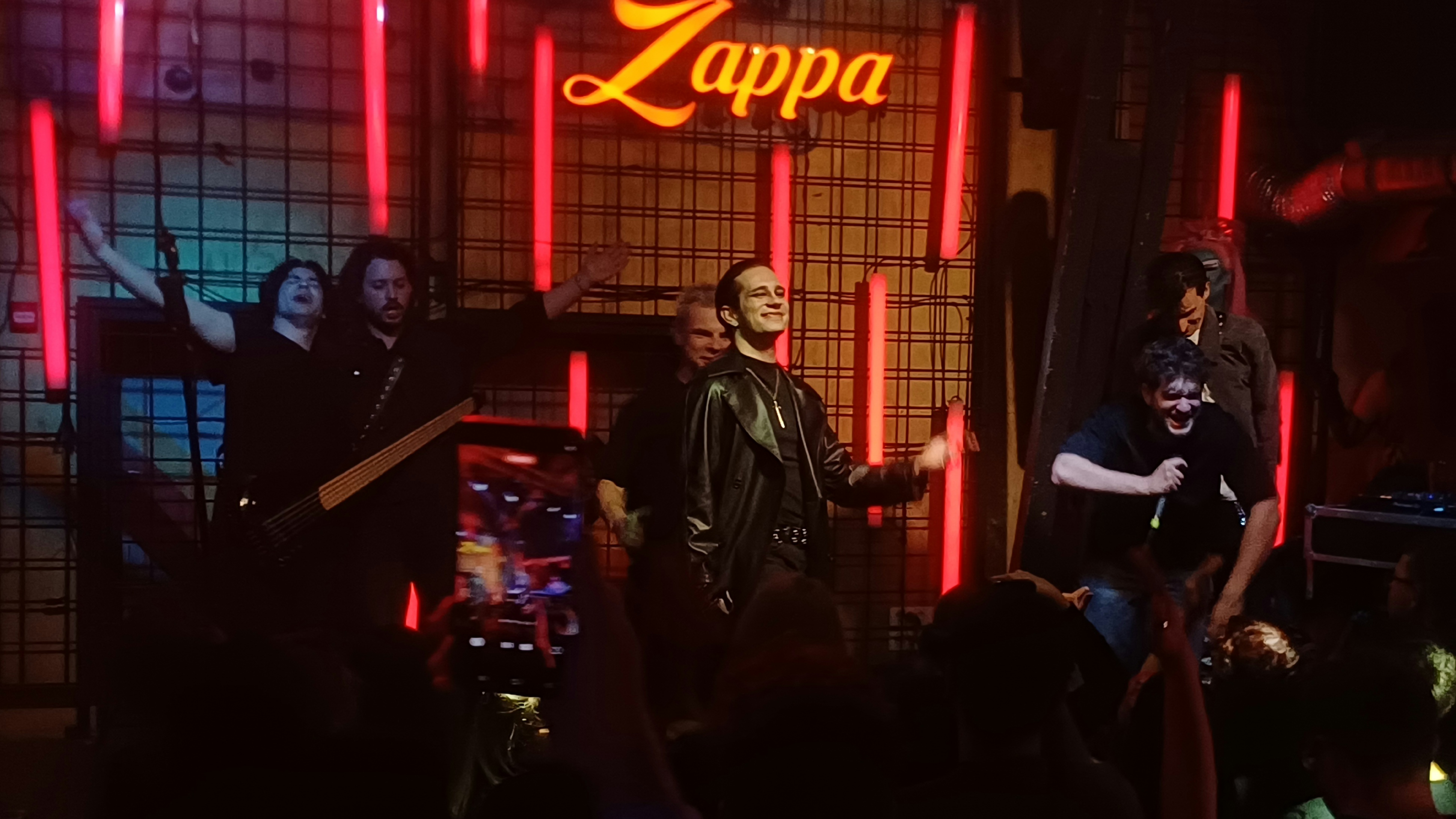
Lavina at the PzE Afterparty event in Belgrade

As part of the promotion of their participation in the contest, Lavina attended Eurovision in Concert on 11 April 2026 and PzE Afterparty on 22 April 2026. Lavina also released two additional versions of their Eurovision entry "Kraj mene", an English languaged version, a symphonic version with the RTS symphonic orchestra and choir, as well as a cover of "In My Dreams" by Wig Wam.

Additionally, Lavina visited the Austrian embassy in Belgrade on 24 April 2026, and the Serbian embassy in Vienna on 5 May 2026 in the lead-up to the contest.

== At Eurovision ==
The Eurovision Song Contest 2026 took place at the Wiener Stadthalle in Vienna, Austria, and consisted of two semi-finals held on the respective dates of 12 and 14 May and the final on 16 May 2026. All nations with the exceptions of the host country and the "Big Four" (France, Germany, Italy and the United Kingdom) were required to qualify from one of two semi-finals in order to compete for the final; the top ten countries from each semi-final progressed to the final. On 12 January 2026, an allocation draw was held to determine which of the two semi-finals, as well as which half of the show, each country performed in; the European Broadcasting Union (EBU) split up the competing countries into different pots based on voting patterns from previous contests, with countries with favourable voting histories put into the same pot. Serbia was scheduled for the second half of the first semi-final. The shows' producers then decided the running order for the semi-finals; Serbia was set to perform in position 15.

In Serbia, RTS broadcast all shows on RTS 1 and RTS Svet with commentary by Duška Vučinić, as well as the first semi-final and final on Radio Belgrade 1 with an unknown commentator.

=== Performance ===
Lavina took part in technical rehearsals on 3 and 7 May, followed by dress rehearsals on 11 and 12 May. The performance was directed by Milica Mikić Soldatović, who also directed Serbia's performances in 2024 and 2025.

=== Semi-final ===
Serbia performed in position 15, closing the show, following the entry from Poland. Serbia qualified for the final.

=== Final ===
Serbia performed in the first half of the final. They finished in 17th place.

=== Voting ===
==== Points awarded to Serbia ====
Points awarded to Serbia (Semi-final 1)
Score	Televote	Jury
12 points	Croatia; Greece; Lithuania; Montenegro	Montenegro
10 points	Poland	Greece
8 points	Finland; Georgia; Moldova; Portugal	
7 points	Italy; Rest of the World; San Marino	Croatia; Poland
6 points	Sweden	Georgia; Portugal
5 points	Estonia; Germany	Moldova
4 points		
3 points	Belgium	San Marino
2 points		
1 point	Israel	

Points awarded to Serbia (Final)
Score	Televote	Jury
12 points	Croatia; Montenegro	Croatia; Montenegro
10 points	Romania	
8 points		Azerbaijan
7 points		
6 points		
5 points		Greece
4 points		
3 points	Albania; Finland; Georgia; Ukraine	
2 points	Czechia	
1 point	Lithuania; Malta; Moldova; Poland	France

==== Points awarded by Serbia ====
Points awarded by Serbia (Semi-final 1)
Score	Televote	Jury
12 points	Croatia	Israel
10 points	Montenegro	Greece
8 points	Greece	Poland
7 points	Moldova	Moldova
6 points	Israel	Estonia
5 points	Finland	Portugal
4 points	Poland	Belgium
3 points	Lithuania	Finland
2 points	Estonia	Croatia
1 point	Sweden	Montenegro

Points awarded by Serbia (Final)
Score	Televote	Jury
12 points	Croatia	Greece
10 points	Bulgaria	Italy
8 points	Greece	Malta
7 points	Romania	Bulgaria
6 points	Italy	Denmark
5 points	Moldova	Norway
4 points	Israel	Israel
3 points	Australia	Moldova
2 points	Finland	Australia
1 point	Albania	Poland

==== Detailed voting results ====
Each participating broadcaster assembles a seven-member jury panel consisting of music industry professionals who are citizens of the country they represent and two of which have to be between 18 and 25 years old. Each jury, and individual jury member, is required to meet a strict set of criteria regarding professional background, as well as diversity in gender and age. No member of a national jury was permitted to be related in any way to any of the competing acts in such a way that they cannot vote impartially and independently. The individual rankings of each jury member as well as the nation's televoting results were released shortly after the grand final.

The following members comprised the Serbian jury:

- Jelena Tomašević
- Aleksandra Kovač
- Dušan Alagić
- Ivan Mileusnić
- Mateja Blažić
- Anđela Vranić (Lores)
- Marija Marić Marković (Mari Mari)

Detailed voting results from Serbia (Semi-final 1)
R/O	Country	Jury									Televote	
R/O	Country	Juror 1	Juror 2	Juror 3	Juror 4	Juror 5	Juror 6	Juror 7	Rank	Points	Rank	Points
01	Moldova	9	5	1	2	5	11	3	4	7	4	7
02	Sweden	11	9	11	10	9	7	6	11		10	1
03	Croatia	7	4	10	11	10	12	10	9	2	1	12
04	Greece	4	1	2	6	1	4	1	2	10	3	8
05	Portugal	6	12	4	4	6	3	13	6	5	12	
06	Georgia	13	14	13	14	14	13	12	14		14	
07	Finland	5	6	7	8	7	10	9	8	3	6	5
08	Montenegro	8	7	9	12	11	5	11	10	1	2	10
09	Estonia	3	8	5	5	13	2	5	5	6	9	2
10	Israel	1	3	6	1	2	1	2	1	12	5	6
11	Belgium	10	10	8	7	3	8	4	7	4	13	
12	Lithuania	12	11	14	9	12	14	14	13		8	3
13	San Marino	14	13	12	13	8	9	7	12		11	
14	Poland	2	2	3	3	4	6	8	3	8	7	4
15	Serbia											

Detailed voting results from Serbia (Final)
R/O	Country	Jury									Televote	
R/O	Country	Juror A	Juror B	Juror C	Juror D	Juror E	Juror F	Juror G	Rank	Points	Rank	Points
01	Denmark	5	9	2	1	6	7	11	5	6	11	
02	Germany	21	15	15	19	17	15	16	19		19	
03	Israel	9	19	1	2	8	5	6	7	4	7	4
04	Belgium	13	16	9	9	12	14	10	13		23	
05	Albania	22	6	22	24	16	22	17	15		10	1
06	Greece	2	3	10	7	2	1	3	1	12	3	8
07	Ukraine	20	18	18	14	20	23	15	20		20	
08	Australia	4	12	6	10	11	11	7	9	2	8	3
09	Serbia											
10	Malta	12	1	4	12	1	6	1	3	8	18	
11	Czechia	16	24	16	15	21	18	20	21		16	
12	Bulgaria	6	2	7	11	5	3	2	4	7	2	10
13	Croatia	3	14	23	13	10	10	14	12		1	12
14	United Kingdom	23	22	21	23	23	19	24	24		22	
15	France	14	13	12	16	9	17	12	14		12	
16	Moldova	10	7	17	6	7	8	4	8	3	6	5
17	Finland	11	4	19	8	19	9	13	11		9	2
18	Poland	8	8	11	4	14	12	9	10	1	17	
19	Lithuania	24	21	24	17	24	21	23	23		21	
20	Sweden	17	20	8	18	18	16	19	16		15	
21	Cyprus	18	10	13	22	15	20	22	17		13	
22	Italy	1	5	5	3	3	4	5	2	10	5	6
23	Norway	7	11	3	5	4	2	8	6	5	14	
24	Romania	19	17	20	20	22	24	21	22		4	7
25	Austria	15	23	14	21	13	13	18	18		24	

==== Controversy ====
The Serbian jury votes in the final faced backlash on Serbian and Croatian social media. While the Croatian jury awarded 12 points to Serbia, the Serbian jury did not award Croatia any points (the Serbian televote awarded 12 points to Croatia regardless). One of the jury members, Jelena Tomašević, later apologized and explained that she put Croatia high in her ranking. Additionally, there was backlash for the points awarded to Israel by the Serbian jury. The jury chairperson, Aleksandra Kovač, defended the vote of the jury, stating that their votes represented their own views, and were not related to any political considerations. Because of this, Kovač faced backlash, which led her to turn off comments on her Instagram account. Lores, a member of the jury, defended her involvement, stating that "she used only the musical criteria and personal affinities" when voting. The juries were also criticized by the Serbian 2022 representative Konstrakta and Kovač's estranged sister Kristina Kovač, both referring to Kovač's remark about the political considerations.

=== Ratings ===
Viewing figures by show for the Eurovision Song Contest 2026 in Serbia
Show	Air date	Viewership	Average viewership	Share
The semi-final with Serbia	12 May 2026	1,100,000	470,000	19.8% (▼0.7%)
The semi-final without Serbia	14 May 2026	—N/a	350,000	13.9% (▲0.5%)
Final	16 May 2026	1,400,000	575,000	36.3% (▲21.3%)
