= Pesma za Evroviziju =

Song contest to select Serbia's Eurovision entry

- Serbian: Песма за Евровизију
- Genre: Song contest
- Presented by: Dragana Kosjerina Perduv (2022–); Kristina Radenković (2022–); Stefan Popović (2022–); Guest presenters: Jovan Radomir (2022); Milan Marić (2023); Slaven Došlo (2024)
- Country of origin: Serbia
- Original language: Serbian
- No. of seasons: 4
- No. of episodes: 12

Production
- Executive producers: Olivera Kovačević (2022–2025); Uroš Marković (2026)
- Production locations: Belgrade, Serbia
- Camera setup: Multi-camera
- Running time: 3 hours
- Production companies: Radio Television of Serbia; SkyMusic

Original release
- Network: RTS 1
- Release: March 3, 2022 – present

Related
- Beovizija; Eurovision Song Contest

Pesma za Evroviziju (Serbian Cyrillic: Песма за Евровизију, lit. 'A Song for Eurovision') is a Serbian song contest organized by Radio Television of Serbia (RTS) in collaboration with SkyMusic. Since its inception in 2022, it has been used to select the Serbian entry for the Eurovision Song Contest.

== Background ==
In October 2021, it was announced that Beovizija would no longer be used to select the Serbian entry for the Eurovision Song Contest, as the company that owns the rights to the Beovizija brand, Megaton, decided not to renew its contract with RTS. In place of Beovizija, a new selection was planned out under the working title RTS Takmičenje za Pesmu Evrovizije (transl. RTS contest for the Eurovision Song Contest). The final title was later revealed to be Pesma za Evroviziju (transl. A Song for Eurovision).

== Visual identity ==
Logo used from 2022 to 2025

The generic logo from 2022 until 2025 was based on the beginning letters of the words "song", "Eurovision" and "Serbia" in Cyrillic, with the name of the contest written next to it.

On 1 December 2025, a new logo for 2026 was unveiled. It contains Cyrillic letters "P" (П), "Z" (З) and "E".

== Rules and format ==
The contest consists of two semi-finals and a final. In each show, the jury and the televoting award 12, 10 and 8–1 points to their 10 favourite songs. In the semi-finals, around half of the songs which received the most points advance to the final. In the final, the song with the most points is declared the winner. In case of a tie, the song that received more points from the televoting is deemed to have finished higher. In case of a tie in the jury votes, the song that received more 12 points is deemed to have finished higher. If the tie is not broken, the process is repeated with the other points from highest to lowest until the draw is resolved. In case the draw cannot be resolved this way, the order in which the president of the jury ranked the songs will be used to determine the ranking. In case the president of the jury had not voted for multiple songs in the draw, they have to decide the ranking in written form as soon as the combined points from all jurors are known. In case multiple songs receive the same amount of televotes, the amount of televotes at the 10-minute mark of the televoting determines their ranking. If the tie is still not broken, the process is repeated with the televotes at the 5-minute mark. In the event that the televoting results cannot be obtained, only the jury determines the ranking of the contestants.

=== Contestants ===
All participants must be at least 16 years old on 1 May of the year in which Pesma za Evroviziju is held. All singers must be citizens of Serbia, while there are no nationality limitations as to who can enter as a songwriter. At most, six people are allowed to be a part of a single performance.

=== Recurring contestants ===
Key

1 Winner
2 Second
3 Third
Finalist
Did not qualify

Participant	Year				
Participant	2022	2023	2024	2025	2026
Zejna					2
Filarri					
Gift					
Harem Girls				2	3
Yanx					
Eegor					
Bojana i David					
Princ		2		1	
Biber					
Aleksa Vučković	(Note: Kao član grupe Lift.)			(Note: Kao član grupe AltCtrl.)	
Dimitrije Borčanin					
Igor Simić					
Jelena Pajić					
Konstrakta	1				
Zorja	3		3		
Ivana Vladović					
Milan Bujaković					
Nadia					
Filip Baloš					
Chegi i Braća Bluz bend					
Boris Subotić					
Angellina					
Ivona					
Tijana Dapčević					
Bane Lalić					

=== Songs ===
The competing entries must not have been released partially or in full before 1 September of the previous year (for example, Pesma za Evroviziju '26 songs must not have been released before 1 September 2025). The songs can be three minutes long at most. In 2022 and 2023, the rules of the contest stated that the lyrics had to be written in one of the official languages of Serbia, although this rule wasn't strictly enforced. For the 2024 contest, the rule was amended, stating that songs have to contain at least 51% of lyrics in one of the official languages of Serbia.

== Presenters ==
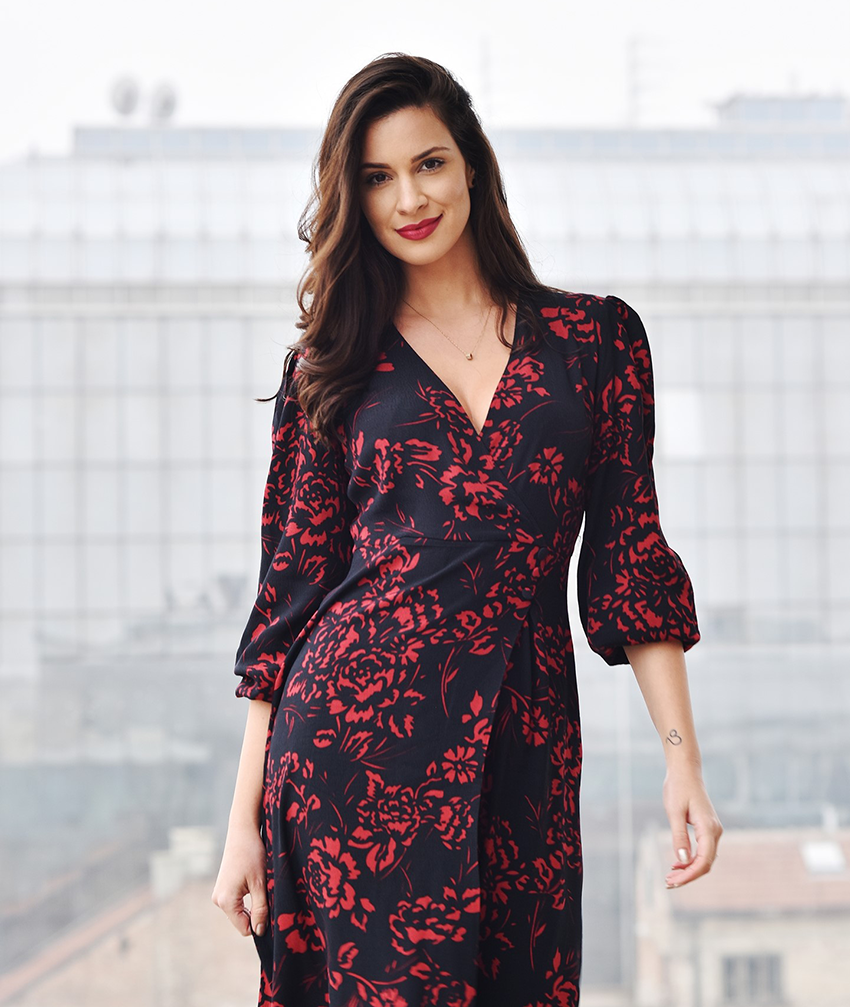
Dragana Kosjerina presents the show every year

Dragana Kosjerina Perduv is the presenter of the programme each year with another guest presenter that changed yearly until 2025, while the green room hosts were Kristina Radenković and Stefan Popović.

In 2025, Kristina Radenković had joined Dragana Kosjerina Perduv as presenter, while Stefan Popović was green room host. It was announced that Slaven Došlo would also be the presenter of the PZE25, and Đorđe Živadinović will be the green room host, but Došlo and Živadinović withdrew from the hosting and joined the boycott against RTS due to the ongoing student protests.

In 2026, Dragana Kosjerina Perduv and Kristina Radenković were the presenters, while Stefan Popović was the green room host.

== Editions ==
Year	Dates	Winners		Placement at Eurovision	Ref.
Year	Dates	Artist(s)	Song	Placement at Eurovision	Ref.
2022	3, 4 and 5 March	Konstrakta	"In corpore sano"	5th	
2023	1, 2 and 4 March	Luke Black	"Samo mi se spava"	24th	
2024	27 and 29 February; 2 March	Teya Dora	"Ramonda"	17th	
2025	25, 26 and 28 February	Princ	"Mila"	Failed to qualify (14th)	
2026	24, 26 and 28 February	Lavina	"Kraj mene"	17th	

== OGAE Serbia ==
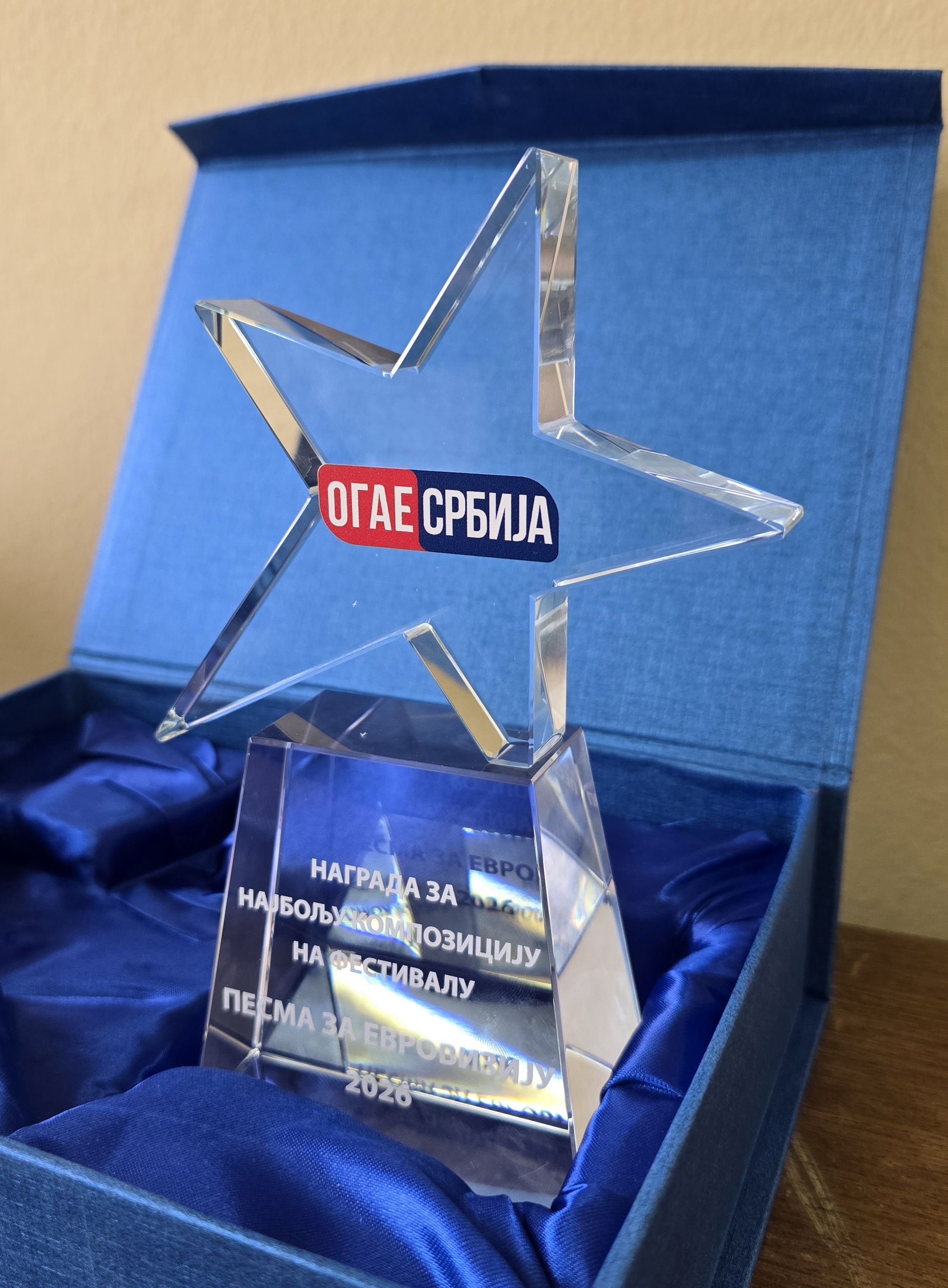
OGAE Serbia Award 2026

OGAE Serbia, the official Eurovision fan club in Serbia, annually awards its prize for the best song based on the votes of its members. Members vote for their favorite song and performance at the Pesma za Evroviziju festival.

The award is presented to the performer immediately after the conclusion of the national final, based on the total number of votes cast by the club’s members.

This voting also serves as the selection of Serbia’s representative for the OGAE Second Chance contest.

OGAE Serbia Award by editions
Year	Artist	Song	Placement at PZE	Ref.
2022	Konstrakta	In corpore sano	1st place	
2023	Luke Black	Samo mi se spava	1st place	
2024	Konstrakta	Novo, bolje	4th place	
2025	Harem Girls	Aladin	2nd place	
2026	Zejna	Jugoslavija	2nd place	

== Winners gallery ==
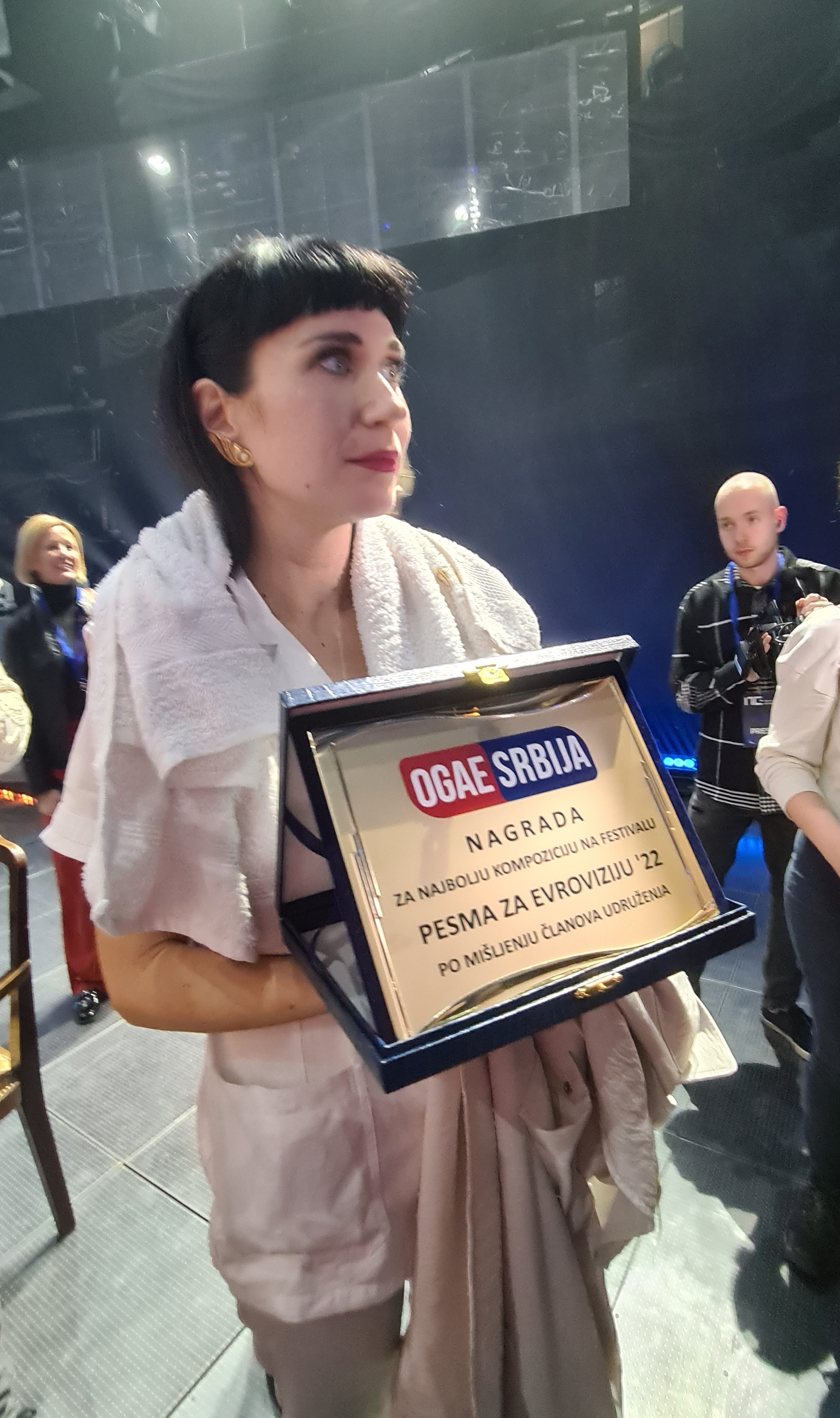
Konstrakta following her Pesma za Evroviziju '22 win

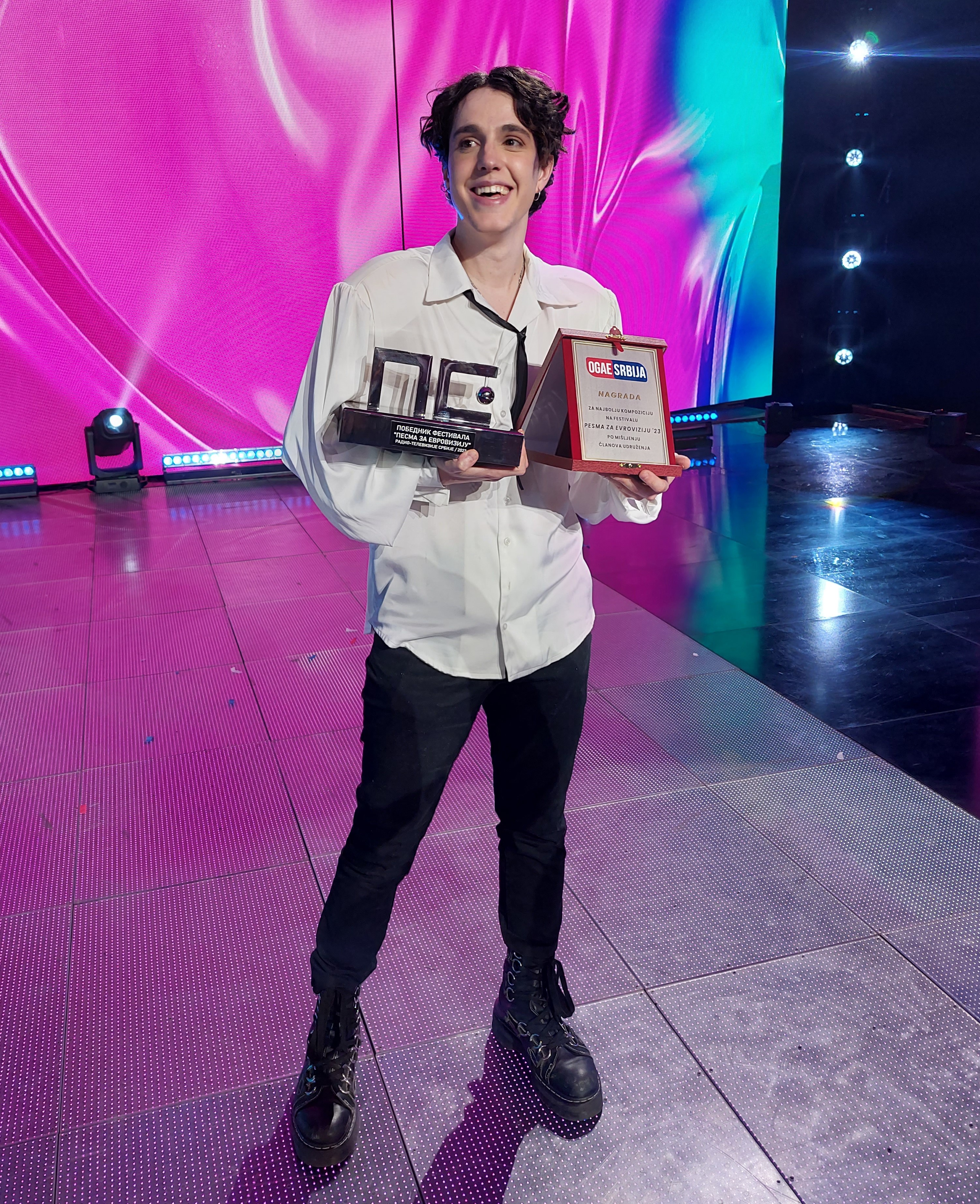
Luke Black following his Pesma za Evroviziju '23 win

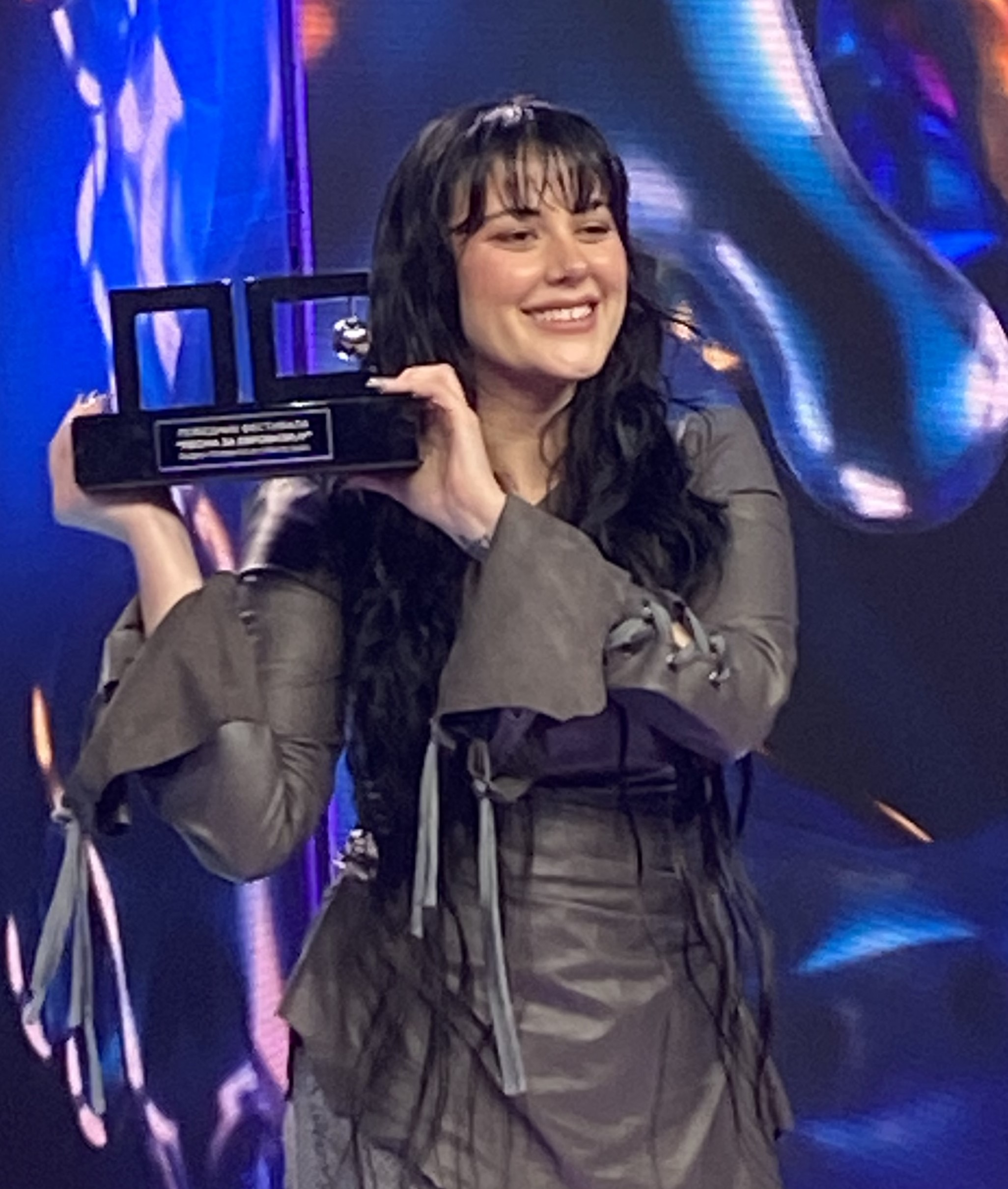
Teya Dora following her Pesma za Evroviziju '24 win

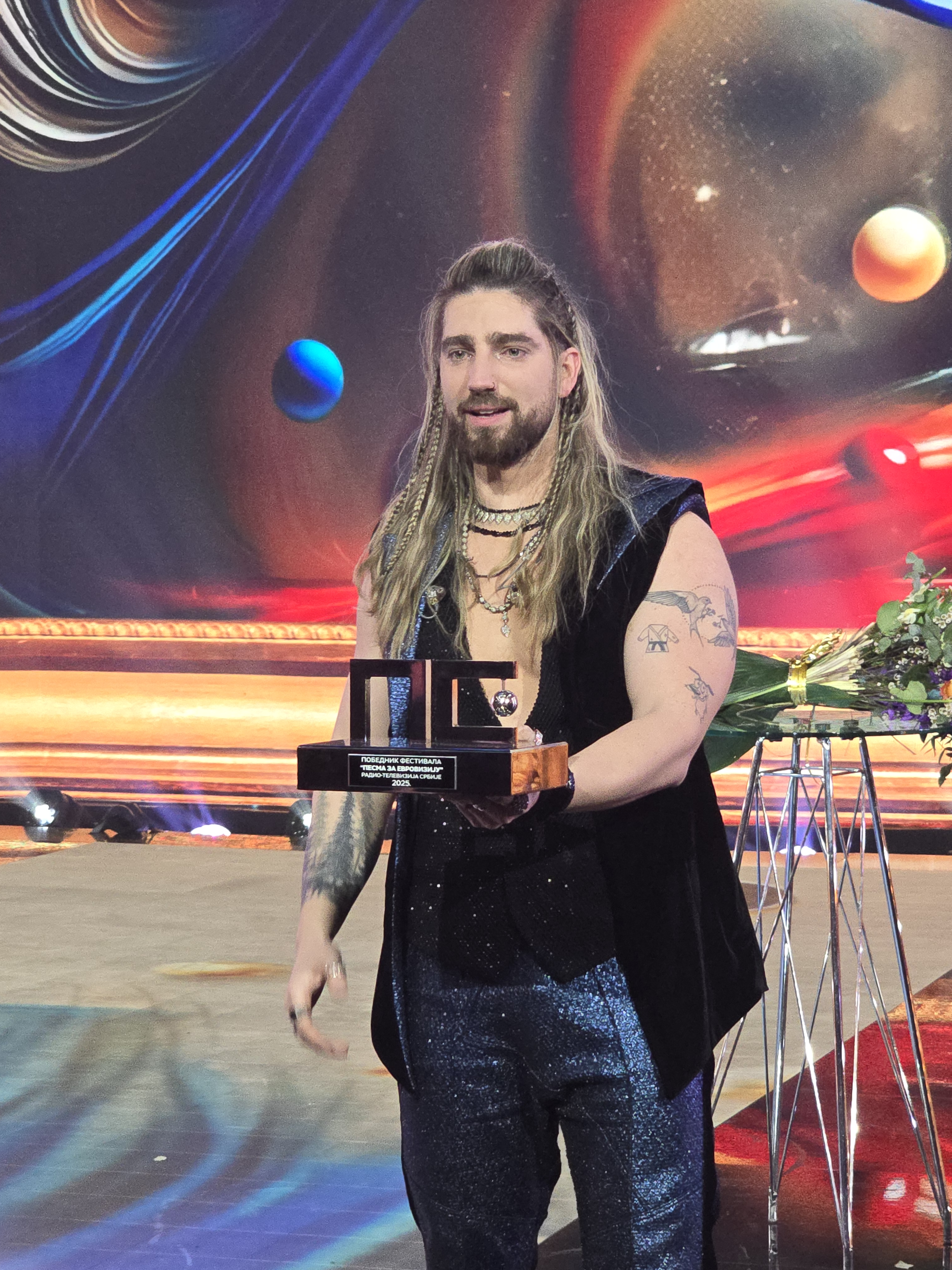
Princ following his Pesma za Evroviziju '25 win

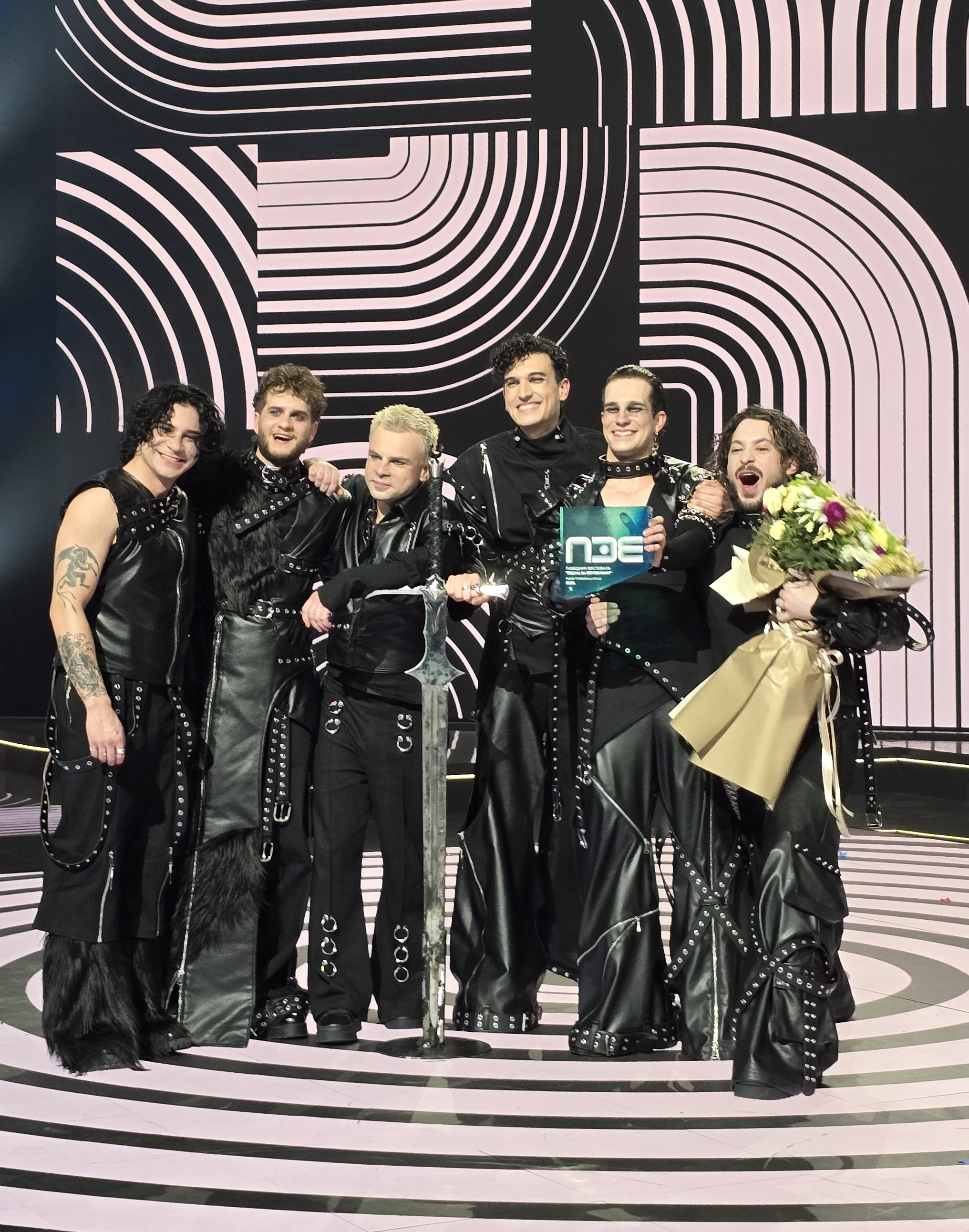
Lavina following their Pesma za Evroviziju '26 win
