= Pesma za Evroviziju '26 =

Serbian national selection for the Eurovision Song Contest 2026

Pesma za Evroviziju 2026

Dates and venue
- Semi-final 1: 24 February 2026
- Semi-final 2: 26 February 2026
- Final: 28 February 2026
- Venue: RTS Studio 8 Košutnjak, Belgrade, Serbia

Organisation
- Organiser: Radio Television of Serbia
- Supervisor: Uroš Marković
- Presenters: Dragana Kosjerina; Kristina Radenković; Stefan Popović

Participants
- Number of entries: 24
- Number of finalists: 14

Vote
- Voting system: 50/50 combination of jury and public vote
- Winning song: "Kraj mene" by Lavina

Pesma za Evroviziju '26 (Serbian Cyrillic: Песма за Евровизију '26; PzE '26) was the fifth edition of Pesma za Evroviziju, the national final organised by Radio Television of Serbia (RTS) to select the Serbian entry for the Eurovision Song Contest 2026. The selection consisted of two semi-finals held on 24 and 26 February 2026, respectively, and a final on 28 February 2026, all presented by Dragana Kosjerina and Kristina Radenković.

== Format and production ==
Shortly after the 2025 contest, the Serbian head of delegation, Uroš Marković, indicated that Serbia would once again organize Pesma za Evroviziju to determine its representative at the Eurovision Song Contest 2026. Public relations manager and contest commentator for RTS, Duška Vučinić, confirmed that the broadcaster would not withdraw from the contest in 2026. Uroš Marković, the Serbian head of delegation at the Eurovision Song Contest, will serve as the new contest supervisor, following the removal of Olivera Kovačević from the role. He previously also served as the music editor for the contest under Kovačević.

On 1 December 2025, a new logo for 2026 was unveiled. It contains Cyrillic letters "P" (П), "Z" (З) and "E" (Е).

== Competing entries ==
On 15 September 2025, RTS opened an online form for interested artists to submit their entries. The submission period was set to last until 1 November 2025. Performers were required to hold Serbian citizenship, whilst there were no limitations as to whom could be a songwriter. At least 51% of lyrics of the submitted entries had to be in one of the official languages of Serbia.

The 24 contestants were announced on 3 December 2025. The list of participants includes Mirna Radulović, who, as part of the group Moje 3, represented Serbia at the Eurovision Song Contest 2013. In addition to Radulović, the following artists are returning to the Serbian selection:

- Harem Girls, which competed the previous year;
- Zejna, who competed in 2024, 2023, and 2022;
- Yanx, who competed in 2024, as well as at Beovizija 2019, 2018, 2009, and Beosong 2013;
- Eegor, who competed in 2023;
- Aleksandra Sekulić, who competed at Beovizija 2019; and
- Nemanja Erić (part of the group GemiNNi), who competed at Beovizija 2019 as part of the group Majdan.

Pesma za Evroviziju '26 participants
Artist(s)	Song	Authors
Aleksandar	"Sudbina" (Судбина)	Aleksandar Radojević; Andreas Björkman; Adriana Pupavac
Aleksandra Sekulić	"Kule" (Куле)	Slavko Milovanović
Ana Mašulović	"Zavoli me" (Заволи ме)	Dušan Alagić; Radovan Dikanović
Avgust	"Jabuka" (Јабука)	Milan Trivić
Bella	"Trampolina" (Трамполина)	Božidar Ristić; Pavle Kovačević
Brat Pelin	"Fräulein"	Stefan Papić
Đurđica	"Moma mala" (Мома мала)	Aleksa Petrović; Pavle Petrović
Eegor	"Klaber" (Клабер)	Igor Mišković
Geminni	"Metar sreće" (Метар среће)	Nemanja Erić; Nataša Erić
Harem Girls and Ivana Krunić	"Bom bom" (Бом бом)	Nemanja Antonić; Aleksandar Ilić Dilan; Miljan Stojanović Nikolovski
Iva Grujin	"Otkrivam sebe" (Откривам себе)	Nemanja Antonić; Nikola Lazić; Iva Grujin
Jack Lupino	"Adrenalin" (Адреналин)	Nebojša Ćulafić; Daniel Ćulafić
Lavina	"Kraj mene" (Крај мене)	Lavina; Ivan Jegdić
Lores	"Unseen"	Ruben Papian
Lu-Ka	"Veruj" (Веруј)	Tamara Popović; Andrija Gavrilović
Kosmos trip	"Sve je u redu" (Све је у реду)	Luka Maksimović; Pavle Đurić
Makao	"Daj nam svet" (Дај нам свет)	Nikola Knežević; Imad El-Aoudeh
Manivi	"Svaki dan" (Сваки дан)	Ivana Vukmirović
Milica Burazer	"Svima vama treba mama" (Свима вама треба мама)	Aleksandra Janković; Ljuba Stojanović; Mladen Stojanović
Mirna	"Omaja" (Омаја)	Mladen Stojanović; Bojana Vunturišević; Đorđe Živadinović
Sanja Aleksić	"Ko me proba" (Ко ме проба)	Dušan Alagić; Radovan Dikanović
Yanx	"Srušio si sve" (Срушио си све)	Aleksandra Janković
Zejna	"Jugoslavija" (Југославија)	Zejna Murkić; Marko Drenjak
Zona	"Čairi" (Чаири)	Tijana Trivić

== Contest overview ==
=== Semi-final 1 ===
The first semi-final was held on 24 February 2026. Twelve songs competed and the seven with the most points qualified for the final.

In addition to the competing entries, Bojana Stamenov and Sofija Petrović opened the show with a medley of "Rise Like a Phoenix" and "Wasted Love", the Eurovision-winning songs for Austria in 2014 and 2025. The interval acts included Ivan Bosiljčić, Daniel Kajmakoski, Igor Simić, Ivona and Filarri, and Ivana Nikolić respectively performing various Austrian Eurovision entries: "Merci, Chérie" (winner in 1966), "Nobody but You" (2018), "Say a Word" (2002), "Who the Hell Is Edgar?" (2023), and "We Will Rave" (2024).

R/O	Artist	Song	Jury		Televote		Total	Place
R/O	Artist	Song	Votes	Points	Votes	Points	Total	Place
1	Mirna	"Omaja"	37	10	879	1	11	5
2	Kosmos trip	"Sve je u redu"	25	6	3,061	12	18	1
3	Iva Grujin	"Otkrivam sebe"	21	3	1,941	8	11	4
4	Eegor	"Klaber"	10	0	1,793	6	6	11
5	Makao	"Daj nam svet"	15	1	1,227	2	3	12
6	Lores	"Unseen"	24	4	1,705	4	8	6
7	Manivi	"Svaki dan"	32	8	690	0	8	8
8	Bella	"Trampolina"	1	0	1,888	7	7	9
9	Yanx	"Srušio si sve"	52	12	694	0	12	3
10	Zejna	"Jugoslavija"	31	7	2,076	10	17	2
11	Ana Mašulović	"Zavoli me"	24	5	1,442	3	8	7
12	Đurđica	"Moma mala"	18	2	1,780	5	7	10

Detailed jury results in the first semi-final of Pesma za Evroviziju '26
R/O	Song	I. Peters	L. Jovanović	T. Bogićević	T. Milošević	M. Milutinović	Total
1	"Omaja"	5	6	10	12	4	34
2	"Sve je u redu"	7	5	4	4	5	25
3	"Otkrivam sebe"	1	1		7	12	21
4	"Klaber"		3	5		2	10
5	"Daj nam svet"	6	2	3	3	1	15
6	"Unseen"	4	4	2	6	8	24
7	"Svaki dan"	10	10	7	5		32
8	"Trampolina"				1		1
9	"Srušio si sve"	12	8	12	10	10	52
10	"Jugoslavija"	8	7	8	2	6	31
11	"Zavoli me"	3		6	8	7	24
12	"Moma mala"	2	12	1		3	18

=== Semi-final 2 ===
The second semi-final was held on 26 February 2026. Twelve songs competed and the seven with the most points qualified for the final. In addition to the competing entries, Princ opened the show performing his two Pesma za Evroviziju entries "Mila" and "Cvet sa istoka". The interval acts saw a medley of past Yugoslav and Serbian acts across the history of the contest, with Mina Gligorić performing "Neke davne zvezde", Dušan Svilar performing "Gori vatra", hosts Dragana Kosjerina and Kristina Radenković performing "Rock Me", Zoe Kida performing "Brazil", Jelena Tomašević performing "Oro", Nina performing "Čaroban", and Nevena Božović performing "Kruna".

R/O	Artist	Song	Jury		Televote		Total	Place
R/O	Artist	Song	Votes	Points	Votes	Points	Total	Place
1	Aleksandar	"Sudbina"	17	3	928	2	5	9
2	Milica Burazer	"Svima vama treba mama"	4	0	1,155	3	3	10
3	Sanja Aleksić	"Ko me proba"	15	2	814	0	2	11
4	Lu-Ka	"Veruj"	20	4	1,207	4	8	7
5	Jack Lupino	"Adrenalin"	26	5	1,680	5	10	5
6	Zona	"Čairi"	56	12	1,839	6	18	3
7	Brat Pelin	"Fräulein"	54	10	5,389	10	20	2
8	Geminni	"Metar sreće"	8	1	2,208	7	8	6
9	Avgust	"Jabuka"	6	0	834	1	1	12
10	Harem Girls and Ivana	"Bom bom"	28	7	3,315	8	15	4
11	Aleksandra Sekulić	"Kule"	26	6	679	0	6	8
12	Lavina	"Kraj mene"	30	8	5,956	12	20	1

Detailed jury results in the second semi-final of Pesma za Evroviziju '26
R/O	Song	I. Peters	L. Jovanović	T. Bogićević	T. Milošević	M. Milutinović	Total
1	"Sudbina"	1	7	2	6	1	17
2	"Svima vama treba mama"	3			1		4
3	"Ko me proba"		3	7	5		15
4	"Veruj"	4	1	5	6	2	20
5	"Adrenalin"	6	5	3	7	5	26
6	"Čairi"	10	10	12	12	12	56
7	"Fräulein"	12	12	10	10	10	54
8	"Metar sreće"		2	1	2	3	8
9	"Jabuka"	2				4	6
10	"Bom bom"	8	6	4	4	6	28
11	"Kule"	5	4	6	3	8	26
12	"Kraj mene"	7	8	8		7	30

=== Final ===
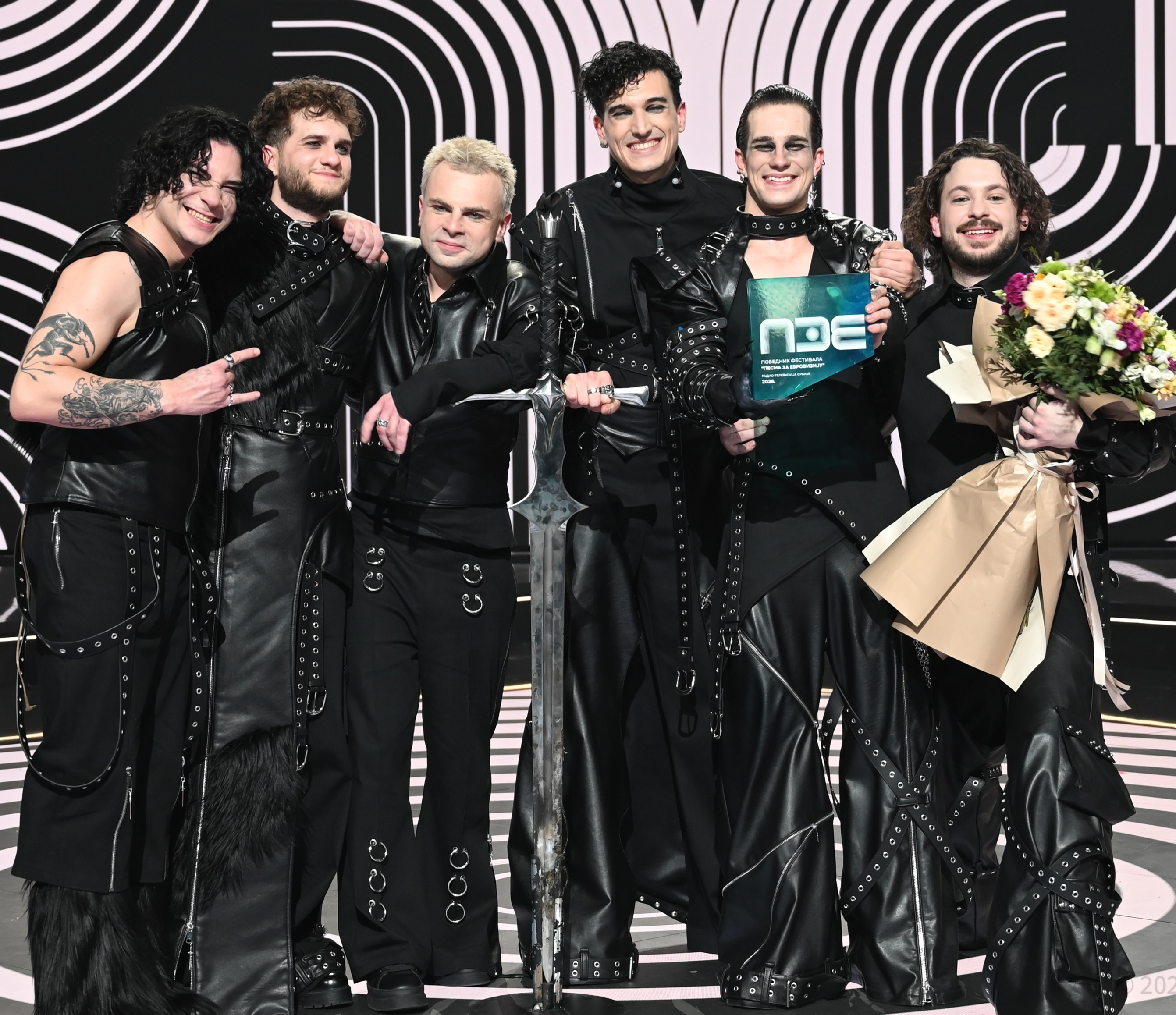
Lavina following their victory.

The final was held on 28 February 2026, starting 21:00 CET. The order of performances was revealed on 27 February 2026. Fourteen songs competed, and the winner, "Kraj mene" performed by Lavina, was decided by a combination of votes from a jury panel consisting of Zoe Kida, Alek Aleksov, Nina, Igor Pantić "Nucci", and Aleksandra Kovač, and the Serbian public via televoting. In addition to the competing entries, Sanja Vučić opened the show with a performance of, "Refrain" (Lys Assia, 1956). The interval acts saw a medley of Eurovision hits, with Sergej Ćetković performing "Hold Me Now" (Johnny Logan, 1987), Jovana Nikolić performing "Everyway That I Can" (Sertab Erener, 2003), Tijana Bogićević performing "Heroes" (Måns Zelmerlöw, 2015) and "Arcade" (Duncan Laurence, 2019), Džordži performing "Soldi" (Mahmood, 2019) and "Zitti e buoni (Måneskin, 2021), Sanja Vučić performing "Queen of Kings" (Alessandra, 2023), "Tattoo" (Loreen, 2023) and "Zari" (Marina Satti, 2024), Stefan Popović performing "Espresso Macchiato" (Tommy Cash, 2025), and the Greek representative at Eurovision 2026, Akylas performing his song "Ferto".

R/O	Artist	Song	Jury		Televote		Total	Place
R/O	Artist	Song	Votes	Points	Votes	Points	Total	Place
1	Brat Pelin	"Fräulein"	22	4	14,003	10	14	4
2	Lores	"Unseen"	25	6	2,239	2	8	6
3	Jack Lupino	"Adrenalin"	2	0	1,952	1	1	13
4	Ana Mašulović	"Zavoli me"	11	2	1,224	0	2	12
5	Harem Girls and Ivana	"Bom bom"	26	7	6,130	8	15	3
6	Iva Grujin	"Otkrivam sebe"	7	0	2,445	4	4	10
7	Kosmos trip	"Sve je u redu"	8	0	4,396	5	5	8
8	Zejna	"Jugoslavija"	50	10	4,454	6	16	2
9	Geminni	"Metar sreće"	3	0	2,316	3	3	11
10	Lu-Ka	"Veruj"	22	5	1,949	0	5	9
11	Lavina	"Kraj mene"	56	12	29,759	12	24	1
12	Yanx	"Srušio si sve"	31	8	682	0	8	7
13	Zona	"Čairi"	18	3	4,726	7	10	5
14	Mirna	"Omaja"	9	1	1,237	0	1	14

Detailed jury results in the final of Pesma za Evroviziju '26
R/O	Song	Zoe Kida	A. Aleksov	Nina	I. Pantić	A. Kovač	Total
1	"Fräulein"	7	3	4	8		22
2	"Unseen"	6	2	7	3	7	25
3	"Adrenalin"				2		2
4	"Zavoli me"		6		5		11
5	"Bom bom"	4	5	5	7	5	26
6	"Otkrivam sebe"		4		1	2	7
7	"Sve je u redu"	5	1	1		1	8
8	"Jugoslavija"	10	8	8	12	12	50
9	"Metar sreće"	3					3
10	"Veruj"	1	10	3		8	22
11	"Kraj mene"	12	12	12	10	10	56
12	"Srušio si sve"	8	7	10		6	31
13	"Čairi"	2	6	6	6	4	18
14	"Omaja"			2	4	3	9

== Other awards ==
=== OGAE Serbia Award ===
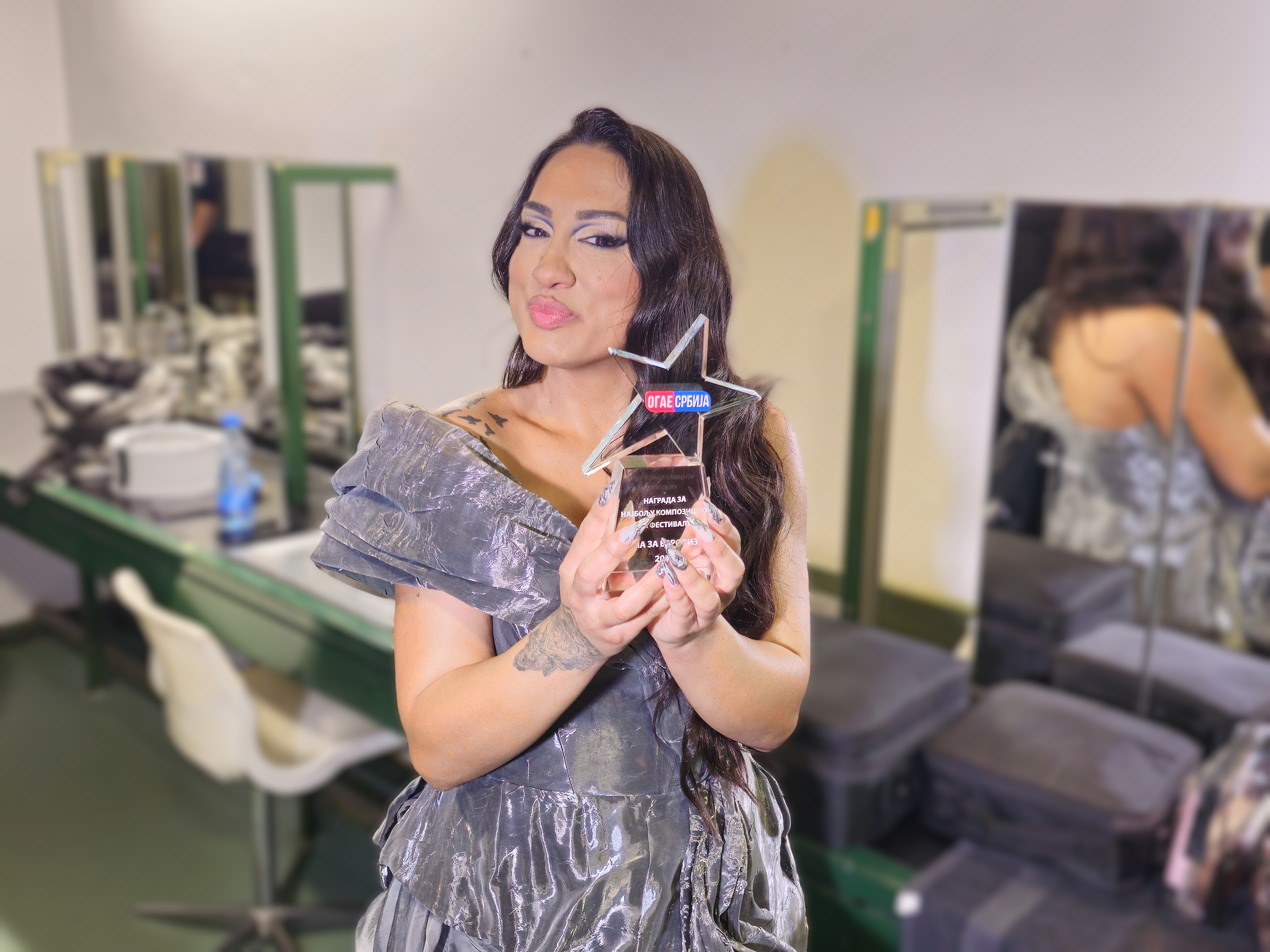
Zejna with the OGAE Serbia Award 2026

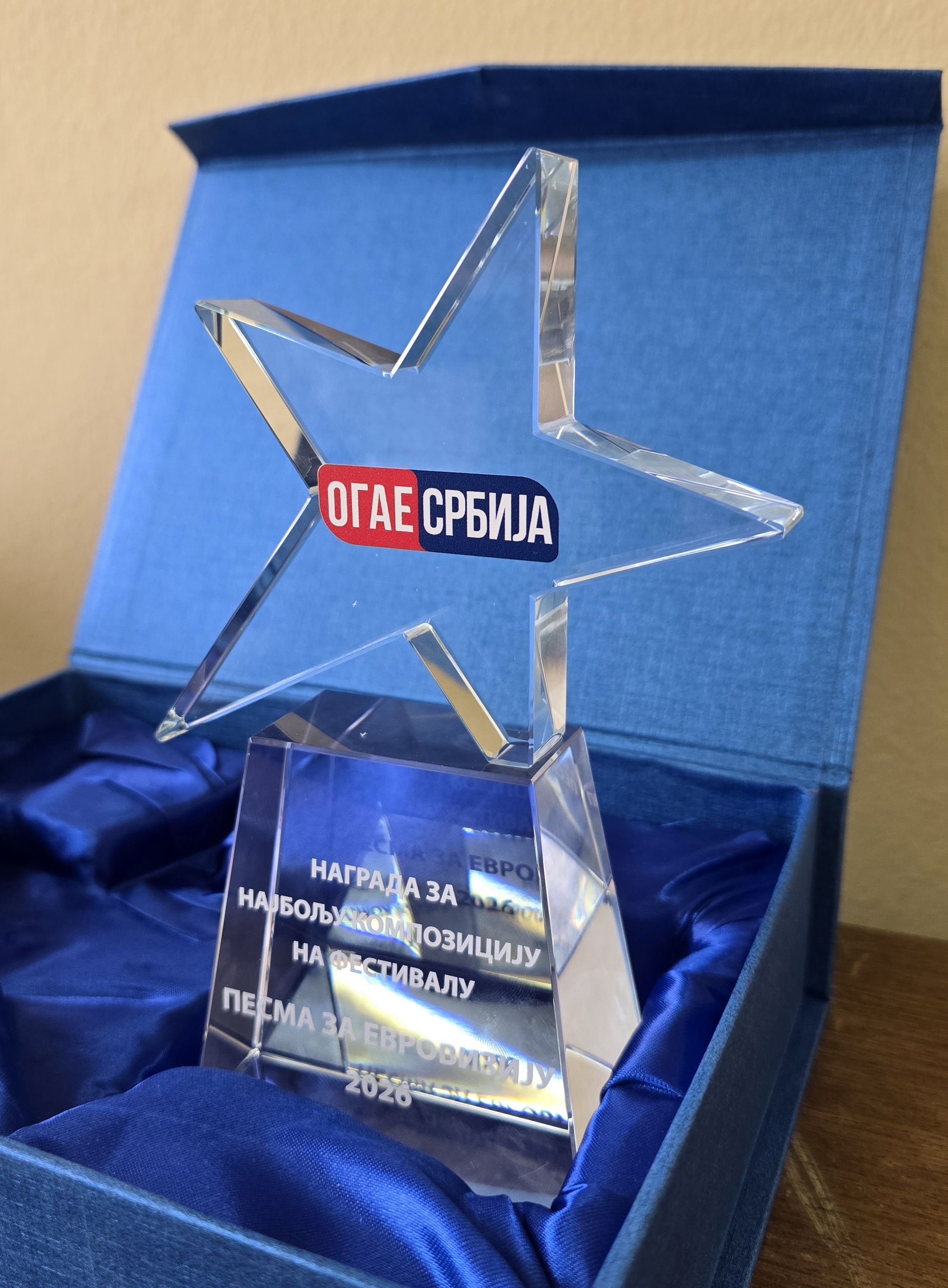
OGAE Serbia Award 2026

The OGAE Serbia Award for the Best Song in Pesma za Evroviziju ′26 was voted on by the association members. The award was won by the song "Jugoslavija" by Zejna, which was thus designated as the Serbian entry to the OGAE Second Chance Contest 2026.

The first five OGAE Serbia votes
Artist	Song	Points	Place
Zejna	"Jugoslavija"	208	1
Zona	"Čairi"	207	2
Lavina	"Kraj mene"	192	3
Brat Pelin	"Fräulein"	160	4
Eegor	"Klaber"	105	5
