= Kraj mene =

2026 song by Lavina

Single by Lavina
- Language: Serbian
- English title: "Next to Me"
- Released: 2 February 2026
- Genre: Progressive metal
- Length: 3:02
- Label: PGP-RTS
- Composer: Lavina
- Lyricists: Lavina; Ivan Jegdić

Eurovision Song Contest 2026 entry
- Country: Serbia

Finals performance
- Semi-final result: 5th
- Semi-final points: 187
- Final result: 17th
- Final points: 90

Entry chronology
- ◄ "Mila" (2025)

"Kraj mene" (Serbian Cyrillic: Крај мене, lit. 'Next to Me') is a song by Serbian progressive metal band Lavina representing Serbia at the Eurovision Song Contest 2026. It was released on 2 February 2026 through PGP-RTS, and was written and composed by the band members, with Ivan Jegdić helping translate the song into Serbian.

== Background and composition ==
Musically, "Kraj mene" blends progressive metal instrumentation with melodic and atmospheric elements. "Kraj mene", according to band members, is a natural continuation of their artistic direction, originally written in English but adapted into Serbian to better express its emotion. In the lead-up to Eurovision, the band said they chose to focus on staying true to themselves, expressing their metal roots and emotions rather than crafting something artificially “competition-friendly.”

The lyrics deal with themes of emotional struggle, unrequited love, and inner conflict. The narrator is invested deeply in someone who might not feel the same way, who has feelings of holding onto hope even as it hurts, as the song says "This one-sided love is killing me", and the emotional weight of wanting someone close ("next to me") while feeling rejected or distant.

EurovisionWorld, one of the most widely used databases for Eurovision songs and national selections, made an analysis of the song. They note that the song's melancholic tone and rock instrumentation set it apart from others. The site also highlighted the strong public and jury support that led to the victory.

== Critical reception ==
Several Serbian entertainment outlets highlighted that "Kraj mene" marked a rare metal-leaning choice for Eurovision. Reports describe the performance as emotive and energetic, and they stress how both the jury and the audience gave high marks.

German magazine Metal Hammer praised the song's victory, and stated that they're "keeping their fingers crossed" for Serbia.

Mr Lordi praised the composition.

== Eurovision Song Contest ==
The Eurovision Song Contest 2026 took place in Vienna, Austria, in May 2026. Serbia competed in the first semi-final, finishing fifth with 187 points. In the Grand Final, they finished 17th with 90 points.

=== Pesma za Evroviziju '26 ===
Serbia's national broadcaster Radio Television of Serbia (RTS) organised Pesma za Evroviziju '26 to select its representative for the Eurovision Song Contest 2026. The competition consisted of two semi-finals held on 24 and 26 February 2026 and a final on 28 February. Lavina qualified from the semi-final and advanced to the grand final, where they won after receiving the highest score from both the jury and public televote. Their victory secured Serbia's participation at Eurovision 2026 in Vienna.

== Charts ==
Chart performance for "Kraj mene"
Chart (2026)	Peak position
Lithuania (AGATA)	69
