= Pesma za Evroviziju '22 =

2022 Serbia contest to enter Eurovision

Pesma za Evroviziju 2022

Dates and venue
- Semi-final 1: 3 March 2022
- Semi-final 2: 4 March 2022
- Final: 5 March 2022
- Venue: RTS Studio 8 Košutnjak, Belgrade, Serbia

Organisation
- Broadcaster: Radio Television of Serbia (RTS)
- Presenters: Dragana Kosjerina; Jovan Radomir; Kristina Radenković; Stefan Popović

Participants
- Number of entries: 36
- Number of finalists: 18

Vote
- Voting system: The jury and the televoting award one set of 12, 10 & 8–1 points each.
- Winning song: "In corpore sano" by Konstrakta

Pesma za Evroviziju '22 (Serbian Cyrillic: Песма за Евровизију '22, PzE '22) was the first edition of Pesma za Evroviziju, Serbia's national final organised by Radio Television of Serbia (RTS) to select the Serbian entry for the Eurovision Song Contest 2022. The selection consisted of two semi-finals held on 3 and 4 March 2022, respectively, and a final on 5 March 2022. All shows were hosted by Dragana Kosjerina and Jovan Radomir with backstage interviews conducted by Kristina Radenković and Stefan Popović. The three shows were broadcast on RTS1 and RTS Planeta as well as streamed online via the broadcaster's website rts.rs.

== Format and production ==
In 2022, RTS decided to organize Pesma za Evroviziju to decide its representative at the Eurovision Song Contest 2022, replacing the previous national final, Beovizija. On 28 September 2022, the rulebook was published. The selection consisted of two semi-finals, held on 3 and 4 March, and a final on 5 March 2023.

=== Voting ===
In all 3 shows, the jury and the televoting award one set of 12, 10 & 8–1 points each to their 10 favourite entries. Nine entries that scored the most points in each semi-final progressed to the final. The act with the most points in the final is declared the winner.

=== Production ===
Pesma za Evroviziju '22 was produced by SkyMusic and RTS. RTS management stated that the budget for the contest was €233,000, and that €277,000 were spent.

=== Hosts ===
All shows were hosted by Dragana Kosjerina and Jovan Radomir with greenroom interviews conducted by Kristina Radenković and Stefan Popović.

== Competing entries ==
Artists and songwriters were able to submit their entries between 28 September 2021 and 1 December 2021. Artists were required to be Serbian citizens and submit entries in one of the official languages of the Republic of Serbia, while songwriters of any nationality were allowed to submit songs. At the closing of the deadline, 150 submissions were received. A selection committee consisting of RTS music editors reviewed the submissions and selected thirty-six entries to proceed to the national final. The selected competing entries were announced on 14 January 2022 and among the competing artists was Sara Jo, who represented Serbia in the Eurovision Song Contest 2013 as part of the group Moje 3.

On 19 January 2022, Stefan Zdravković (Princ od Vranje) announced his withdrawal from the national final due to conflicts with the songwriter of his song "Ljubi svog čoveka". The song was instead performed by Tijana Dapčević, who represented Macedonia in the Eurovision Song Contest 2014, under an altered version titled "Ljubi, ljubi doveka". On 14 February 2022, RTS announced that Goca Tržan had withdrawn from the national final due to health problems and was replaced with the song "Devojko sa plamenom u očima" performed by Chegi and Braća Bluz Band.

Artist	Song	Songwriter(s)
Aca Lukas	"Oskar" (Оскар)	Saša Nikolić, Mira Mijatović
Ana Stanić	"Ljubav bez dodira" (Љубав без додира)	Vojislav Dragović, Ana Stanić
Angellina	"Origami" (Оригами)	Ognjen Jovanov, Marko Kon, Anđela "Angellina" Vujović
Bane Lalić and MVP	"Tu gde je ljubav ne postoji mrak" (Ту где је љубав не постоји мрак)	Bane Lalić
Biber	"Dve godine i šes' dana" (Две године и шес' дана)	Rastko Aksentijević, Momčilo Bajagić Bajaga
Bojana Mašković	"Dama" (Дама)	Dušan Krsmanović, Alen Duš
Boris Subotić	"Vrati mi" (Врати ми)	Boris Subotić
Chegi & Braća Bluz Band	"Devojko sa plamenom u očima" (Девојко са пламеном у очима)	Željko Čeganjac, Stefan Čeganjac, Dušan Čeganjac
Dušan Svilar	"Samo ne reci da voliš" (Само не реци да волиш)	Rastko Aksentijević, Momčilo Bajagić Bajaga
Euterpa	"Nedostaješ" (Недостајеш)	Boris Krstajić, Vladimir Danilović
Gift	"Haos" (Хаос)	Gift, Jovan Matić
~~Goca Tržan~~	~~"Fitilj" (Фитиљ)~~	~~Dušan Bačić~~
Gramophonedzie (Note: Vocals were provided by Maat Bandy.)	"Počinjem da ludim" (Почињем да лудим)	Marko Milićević, Milana Popović
Igor Simić	"To nisam ja" (То нисам ја)	Darko Dimitrov, Vladimir Danilović
Ivana Vladović and Jovana Stanimirović	"Prijaće ti" (Пријаће ти)	Ivan Ilić, Nikola Bulatović
Ivona	"Znam" (Знам)	Ivona Pantelić
Jelena Pajić	"Pogledi" (Погледи)	Marijo Pajić, Đorđe Miljenović
Julija	"Brzina" (Брзина)	Nenad Ćeranić
Julijana Vincan	"Istina i laži" (Истина и лажи)	Linda Persson, Ylva Persson, Vildana Husibegović
Konstrakta	"In corpore sano"	Ana Đurić, Milovan Bošković
Lift	"Drama" (Драма)	Milan "SevdahBABY" Stanković, Lift
Marija Mikić	"Ljubav me inspiriše" (Љубав ме инспирише)	Vuxa, Miladin Bogosavljević
Marija Mirković	"Požuri, požuri" (Пожури, пожури)	Marija Mirković, Alka Vuica
Marko Nikolić	"Dođi da te volim" (Дођи да те волим)	Marko Nikolić, Nada Bučević
Mia	"Blanko" (Бланко)	Aleksandra Milutinović
Naiva	"Skidam" (Скидам)	Zoran Babović Babonja, Jelena Živanović
Orkestar Aleksandra Sofronijevića	"Anđele moj" (Анђеле мој)	Aleksandar Sofronijević, Nikola Labović, Mirna Košanin
Rocher Etno Band	"Hajde sad nek' svak' peva" (Хајде сад нек' свак' пева)	Miodrag Klisarić
Sanja Bogosavljević	"Priđi mi" (Приђи ми)	Ilija Antović
Sara Jo	"Muškarčina" (Мушкарчина)	Slobodan Veljković, Bojana Vunturišević
Srđan Lazić	"Tražim te" (Тражим те)	Srđan Lazić
~~Stefan Zdravković (Princ od Vranje)~~	~~"Ljubi svoga čoveka" (Љуби свога човека)~~	~~Leontina Vukomanović~~
Tijana Dapčević	"Ljubi, ljubi doveka" (Љуби, љуби довека)	Leontina Vukomanović
Vasco	"Znaš li" (Знаш ли)	Vasilije Čolan Vasco, Ivan Franović, Marko Kon, Anđela "Angellina" Vujović
VIS Limunada	"Pesma ljubavi" (Песма љубави)	Miodrag Ninić
Zejna Murkić	"Nema te" (Нема те)	Vlado Maraš, Sanja Perić
Zoe Kida	"Bejbi" (Бејби)	Ana Radonjić
Zorja	"Zorja" (Зорја)	Zorja Pajić, Lazar Pajić

== Contest overview ==
=== Semi-finals ===
The semi-finals took place at the Studio 9 of RTS in Košutnjak, Belgrade on 3 and 4 March 2022. In each semi-final eighteen songs competed and the nine qualifiers for the final were decided by a combination of votes from a jury panel consisting of Željko Vasić (singer), Tijana Milošević (violinist), Vojislav Aralica (producer), Tijana Bogićević (represented Serbia in the Eurovision Song Contest 2017) and Biljana Krstić (singer), and the Serbian public via SMS voting.

==== Semi-final 1 ====
The first semi-final was held on 3 March 2022. Zorja scored the most points in this semi-final, followed by Konstrakta, Aca Lukas, Biber, Lift, Marija Mikić, Angellina, Ana Stanić and Ivona. The artists that failed to qualify for the final were Boris Subotić, Jelena Pajić, Igor Simić, Sanja Bogosavljević, VIS Limunada, Bojana Mašković, Bane Lalić & MVP, Julija and Mia. In addition to the competing entries, former Eurovision contestants Hurricane (who represented Serbia in 2020 and 2021) were featured as the guest performers in the first semi-final.

Results of the first semi-final of Pesma za Evroviziju '22
R/O	Artist	Song	Jury		Televote		Total	Place
R/O	Artist	Song	Votes	Points	Votes	Points	Total	Place
1	Sanja Bogosavljević	"Priđi mi"	9	1	499	0	1	13
2	VIS Limunada	"Pesma ljubavi"	0	0	823	0	0	14
3	Zorja	"Zorja"	46	10	5,518	12	22	1
4	Bojana Mašković	"Dama"	3	0	338	0	0	14
5	Boris Subotić	"Vrati mi"	0	0	1,976	5	5	10
6	Ivona	"Znam"	19	4	1,072	2	6	9
7	Bane Lalić and MVP	"Tu gde je ljubav ne postoji mrak"	5	0	901	0	0	14
8	Angellina	"Origami"	21	5	1,693	3	8	7
9	Ana Stanić	"Ljubav bez dodira"	32	7	650	0	7	8
10	Julija	"Brzina"	0	0	584	0	0	14
11	Aca Lukas	"Oskar"	28	6	2,936	6	12	3
12	Konstrakta	"In corpore sano"	60	12	4,750	8	20	2
13	Igor Simić	"To nisam ja"	0	0	1,056	1	1	12
14	Mia	"Blanko"	8	0	388	0	0	14
15	Jelena Pajić	"Pogledi"	9	2	610	0	2	11
16	Biber	"Dve godine i šes' dana"	40	8	1,953	4	12	4
17	Marija Mikić	"Ljubav me inspiriše"	10	3	4,412	7	10	6
18	Lift	"Drama"	0	0	5,020	10	10	5

Detailed jury votes
R/O	Song	Ž. Vasić	T. Milošević	V. Aralica	T. Bogićević	B. Krstić	Total
1	"Priđi mi"	1	2	3	1	2	9
2	"Pesma ljubavi"						0
3	"Zorja"	6	10	10	10	10	46
4	"Dama"					3	3
5	"Vrati mi"						0
6	"Znam"	5	3	7		4	19
7	"Tu gde je ljubav ne postoji mrak"	3		2			5
8	"Origami"		4	4	7	6	21
9	"Ljubav bez dodira"	8	6	6	5	7	32
10	"Brzina"						0
11	"Oskar"	7	7	5	4	5	28
12	"In corpore sano"	12	12	12	12	12	60
13	"To nisam ja"						0
14	"Blanko"				8		8
15	"Pogledi"	2	5		2		9
16	"Dve godine i šes' dana"	10	8	8	6	8	40
17	"Ljubav me inspiriše"	4	1	1	3	1	10
18	"Drama"						0

==== Semi-final 2 ====
The second semi-final was held on 4 March 2022. Sara Jo scored the most points in this semi-final, followed by Gift, Zoe Kida, Chegi & Braća Bluz Band, Gramophonedzie, Orkestar Aleksandra Sofronijevića, Zejna Murkić, Naiva and Tijana Dapčević. The artists that failed to qualify for the final were Dušan Svilar, Julijana Vincan, Srđan Lazić, Rocher Etno Band, Marija Mirković, Euterpa, Ivana Vladović and Jovana Stanimirović, Marko Nikolić and Vasco. In addition to the competing entries, former Eurovision contestants Daniel Popović (who represented Yugoslavia in 1983), Bojana Stamenov (who represented Serbia in 2015), Danica Krstić and Mladen Lukić (who represented Serbia in 2018 as part of Balkanika), and singers Đorđe David and Ivana Peters were featured as guest performers in the second semi-final

Results of the second semi-final of Pesma za Evroviziju '22
R/O	Artist	Song	Jury		Televote		Total	Place
R/O	Artist	Song	Votes	Points	Votes	Points	Total	Place
1	Srđan Lazić	"Tražim te"	12	3	444	0	3	12
2	Julijana Vincan	"Istina i laži"	2	0	1,904	3	3	11
3	Marko Nikolić	"Dođi da te volim"	7	0	661	0	0	17
4	Zoe Kida	"Bejbi"	29	6	2,018	5	11	3
5	Orkestar Aleksandra Sofronijevića	"Anđele moj"	12	4	1,995	4	8	6
6	Chegi & Braća Bluz Band	"Devojko sa plamenom u očima"	0	0	3,727	10	10	4
7	Euterpa	"Nedostaješ"	3	0	1,265	1	1	15
8	Dušan Svilar	"Samo ne reci da voliš"	26	5	1,252	0	5	10
9	Ivana Vladović and Jovana Stanimirović	"Prijaće ti"	9	1	551	0	1	16
10	Gift	"Haos"	54	12	2,178	6	18	2
11	Zejna Murkić	"Nema te"	36	8	595	0	8	7
12	Sara Jo	"Muškarčina"	54	10	5,615	12	22	1
13	Marija Mirković	"Požuri, požuri"	11	2	1,148	0	2	14
14	Rocher Etno Band	"Hajde sad nek' svak' peva"	0	0	1,771	2	2	13
15	Vasco	"Znaš li"	0	0	899	0	0	17
16	Tijana Dapčević	"Ljubi, ljubi doveka"	35	7	940	0	7	9
17	Gramophonedzie	"Počinjem da ludim"	0	0	2,482	8	8	5
18	Naiva	"Skidam"	0	0	2,338	7	7	8

Detailed jury votes
R/O	Song	Ž. Vasić	T. Milošević	V. Aralica	T. Bogićević	B. Krstić	Total
1	"Tražim te"	1	3		4	4	12
2	"Istina i laži"		2				2
3	"Dođi da te volim"	2			2	3	7
4	"Bejbi"	4	8	7	5	5	29
5	"Anđele moj"	5	1	4		2	12
6	"Devojko sa plamenom u očima"						0
7	"Nedostaješ"			3			3
8	"Samo ne reci da voliš"	7	4	2	6	7	26
9	"Prijaće ti"		5	1	3		9
10	"Haos"	10	12	12	8	12	54
11	"Nema te"	6	7	8	7	8	36
12	"Muškarčina"	12	10	10	12	10	54
13	"Požuri, požuri"	3		6	1	1	11
14	"Hajde sad nek' svak' peva"						0
15	"Znaš li"						0
16	"Ljubi, ljubi doveka"	8	6	5	10	6	35
17	"Počinjem da ludim"						0
18	"Skidam"						0

=== Final ===
The final took place at the Studio 9 of RTS in Košutnjak, Belgrade on 5 March 2022 and featured the eighteen qualifiers from the preceding two semi-finals. The winner, "In corpore sano" performed by Konstrakta, was decided by a combination of votes from a jury panel consisting of Dragoljub Ilić (composer), Slobodan Marković (composer), Una Senić (music journalist), Vladimir Nikolov (composer) and Neda Ukraden (singer), and the Serbian public via SMS voting. Former Eurovision contestants Jelena Tomašević (who represented Serbia in 2008), Sergej Ćetković (who represented Montenegro in 2014), Knez (who represented Montenegro in 2015), Tijana Bogićević (who represented Serbia in 2017), and singers Lena Kovačević, Kiki Lesendrić, Alen Ademović and Boris Režak were featured as guest performers during the show.

Results of the final of Pesma za Evroviziju '22
R/O	Artist	Song	Jury		Televote		Total	Place
R/O	Artist	Song	Votes	Points	Votes	Points	Total	Place
1	Naiva	"Skidam"	14	0	3,204	0	0	15
2	Orkestar Aleksandra Sofronijevića	"Anđele moj"	2	0	2,829	0	0	15
3	Gift	"Haos"	11	0	3,208	1	1	13
4	Zejna Murkić	"Nema te"	15	1	846	0	1	14
5	Tijana Dapčević	"Ljubi, ljubi doveka"	17	4	1,228	0	4	11
6	Lift	"Drama"	1	0	6,947	6	6	7
7	Gramophonedzie	"Počinjem da ludim"	10	0	2,444	0	0	15
8	Zorja	"Zorja"	31	8	16,875	8	16	3
9	Aca Lukas	"Oskar"	6	0	11,018	7	7	5
10	Zoe Kida	"Bejbi"	20	5	4,030	2	7	6
11	Sara Jo	"Muškarčina"	46	10	21,253	10	20	2
12	Ana Stanić	"Ljubav bez dodira"	20	6	1,098	0	6	9
13	Biber	"Dve godine i šes' dana"	1	0	3,130	0	0	15
14	Angellina	"Origami"	20	7	5,273	3	10	4
15	Chegi & Braća Bluz Band	"Devojko sa plamenom u očima"	0	0	6,145	5	5	10
16	Ivona	"Znam"	15	3	2,169	0	3	12
17	Marija Mikić	"Ljubav me inspiriše"	15	2	5,683	4	6	8
18	Konstrakta	"In corpore sano"	46	12	44,459	12	24	1

Detailed jury votes
R/O	Song	D. Ilić	S. Marković	U. Senić	V. Nikolov	N. Ukraden	Total
1	"Skidam"	3	4	2	4	1	14
2	"Anđele moj"					2	2
3	"Haos"			6		5	11
4	"Nema te"	4	2		2	7	15
5	"Ljubi, ljubi doveka"	2	8	3		4	17
6	"Drama"	1					1
7	"Počinjem da ludim"			10			10
8	"Zorja"	10	3		6	12	31
9	"Oskar"					6	6
10	"Bejbi"	5		7	5	3	20
11	"Muškarčina"	8	12	8	8	10	46
12	"Ljubav bez dodira"	6	7	4	3		20
13	"Dve godine i šes' dana"		1				1
14	"Origami"		6	5	1	8	20
15	"Devojko sa plamenom u očima"						0
16	"Znam"		5		10		15
17	"Ljubav me inspiriše"	7		1	7		15
18	"In corpore sano"	12	10	12	12		46

== Broadcasts ==
The three shows were broadcast on RTS1 and RTS Planeta as well as streamed online via the broadcaster's website rts.rs.

Viewing figures by show on RTS1
Show	Air date	Average viewership	Total viewership	Share (%)	Ref.
Semi-final 1	3 March 2022	418,000	1,400,000	16.86%	
Semi-final 2	4 March 2022	429,000	1,600,000	17.55%	
Final	5 March 2022	568,000	1,500,000	21.74%	

== Other awards ==
=== OGAE Serbia awards ===
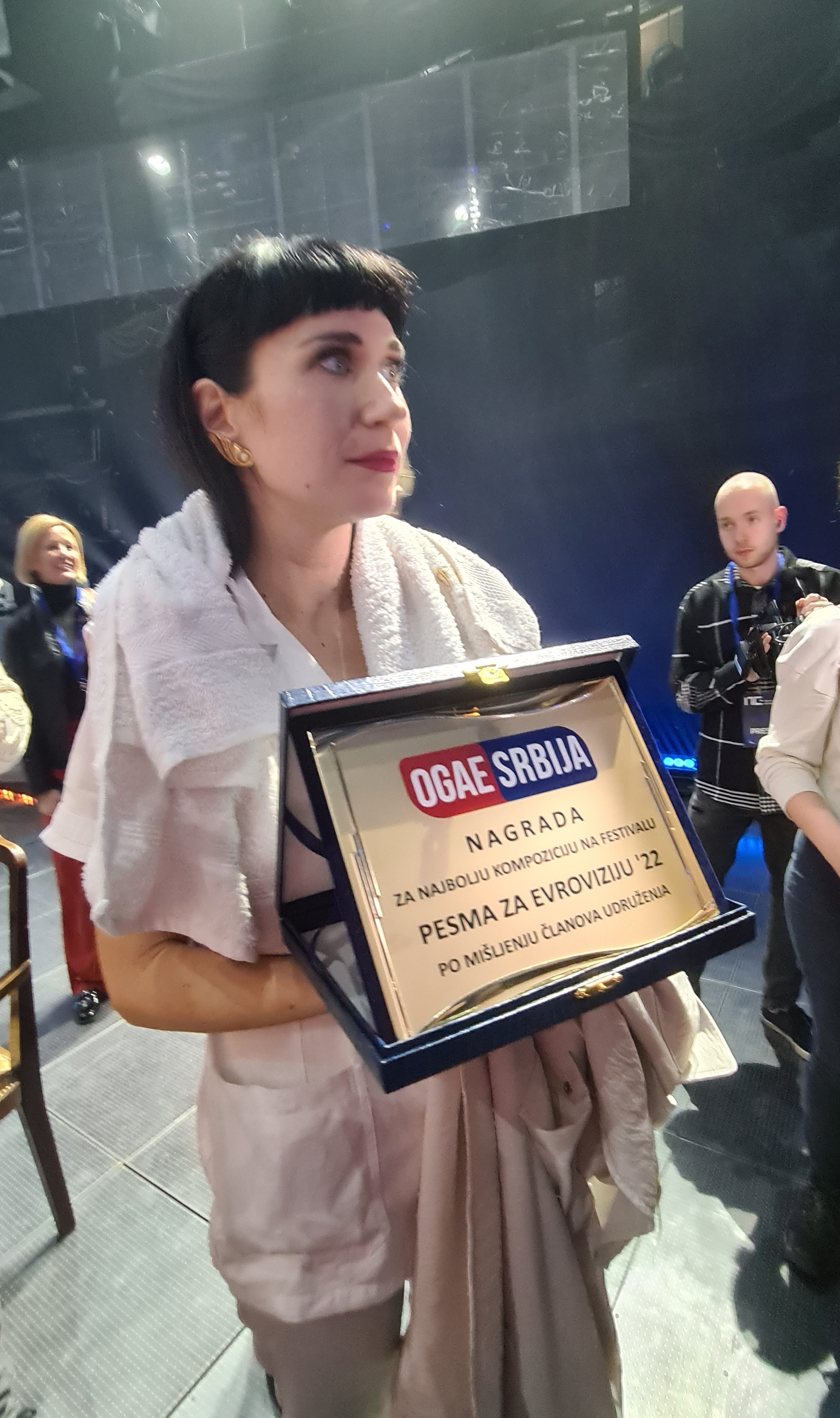
Konstrakta with OGAE Serbia Award

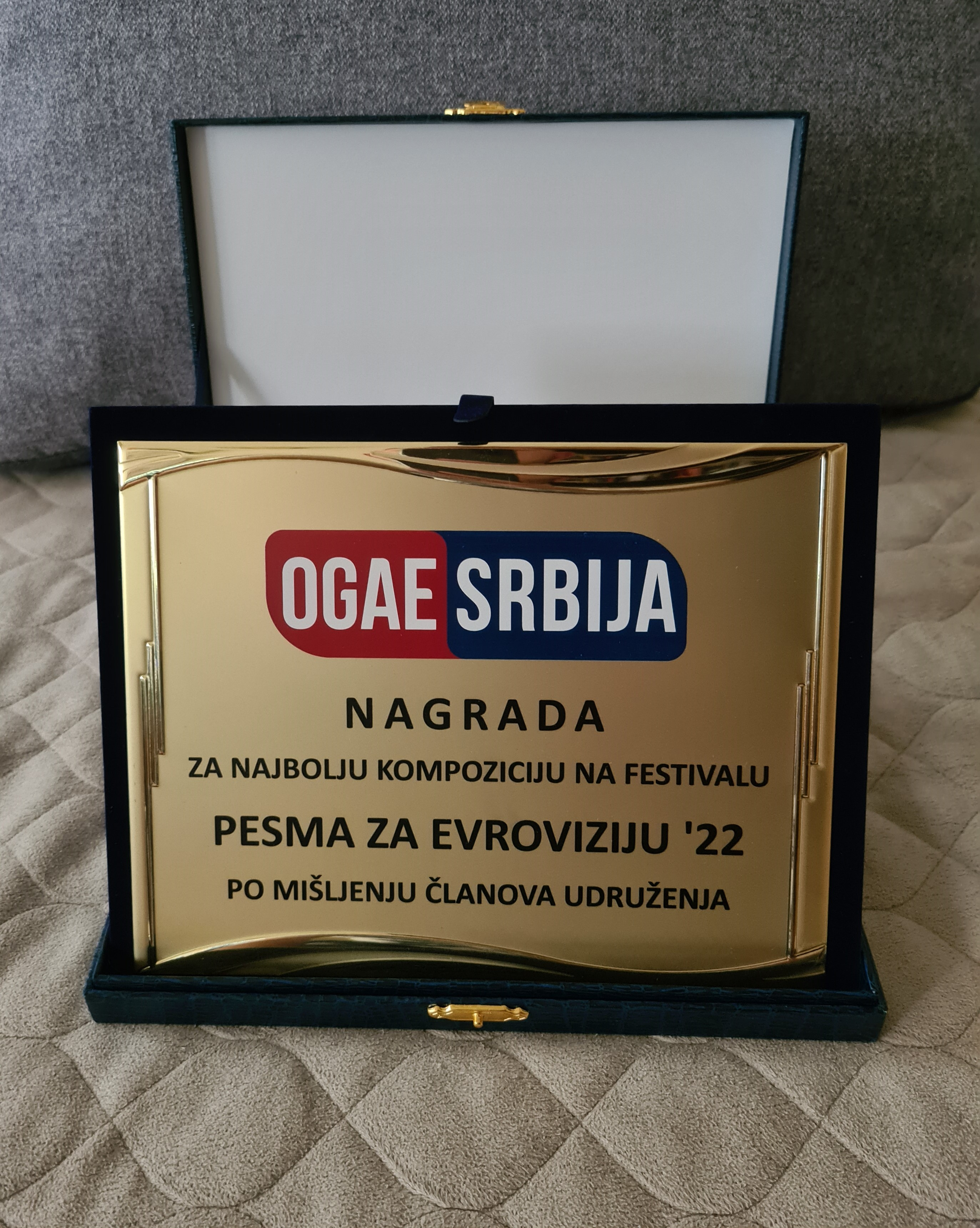
OGAE Serbia Awards 2022

Following the event, the fan organisation OGAE Serbia voted on the best song at Pesma za Evroviziju '22 as decided by association members. The award was won by the winning song "In corpore sano" with 256 points. Second place, with 233 points, came from the song "Muškarčina" by Sara Jo, while third place went to Zorja and her song "Zorja" with 143 points. Sara Jo was also the winner of the OGAE Second Chance, which was awarded after a round of voting with all entries, not including the winning song of the event.

Artist	Song	Points	Place
Konstrakta	"In corpore sano"	256	1
Sara Jo	"Muškarčina"	233	2
Angellina	"Origami"	143	3
Zorja	"Zorja"	130	4
Marija Mikić	"Ljubav me inspiriše"	104	5

== Controversies ==
After the final, singer Aca Lukas, who placed 5th in the final with the song "Oskar", accused the Serbian public broadcaster RTS of irregularities in the voting of the selection, stating he would file a criminal complaint against the head of RTS, editor of entertainment program Olivera Kovačević and general director Dragan Bujošević for "stealing votes". RTS responded, stating that the SMS votes were counted automatically by software which did not allow interference. The Comtrade System Integration company, which set up the software to count the votes, said it was prepared to hand the votes to the authorities if requested to do so, adding that the same data is available from mobile phone operators. He also made comments about the winning performer Konstrakta, saying: "I could have gone on stage and washed my feet, but I chose instead to perform", also claiming she is working for opposition political parties. Konstrakta, laughing off his suggestion, jokingly offered "to wash his feet for him." After the controversy, RTS and Kovačević announced they would sue Lukas.
