= Harem Girls =

Serbian drag group

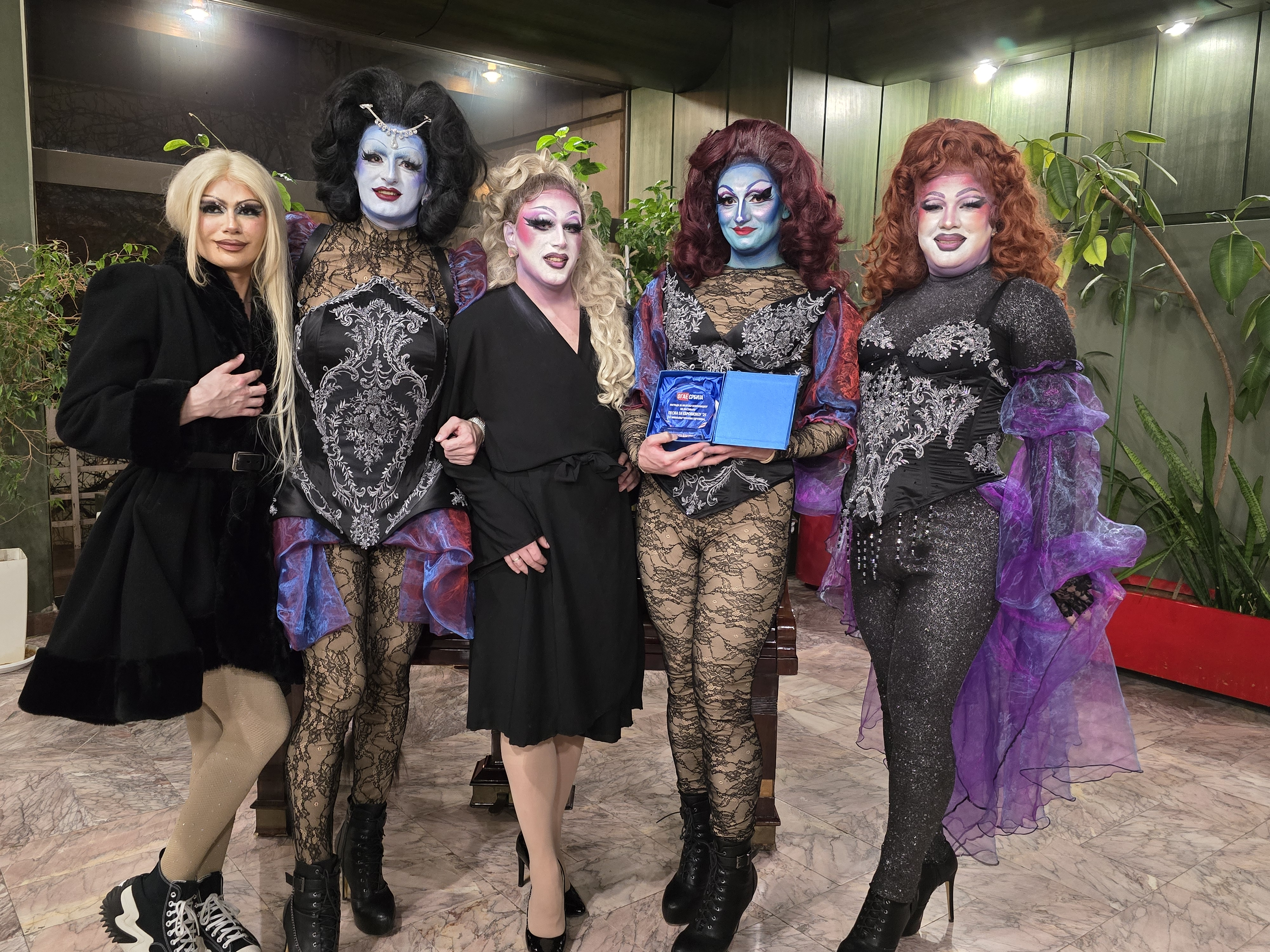

Background information
- Origin: Belgrade, Serbia
- Years active: 2023–present
- Members: Lady Siren; Lefkada Tsunami; Lola Love; Nina Lee; Titta Foureira
- Past members: Nastasja Filipovna

Harem Girls is a Serbian drag collective.

== History ==
Harem Girls was founded in 2023 under the name Dreg harem. The name was inspired by the idea of a sultan having multiple wives in his harem while the group still had a drag king, but when he left the group, only the queens remained, and thus Harem Girls were born. As the members stated in an interview, the group was brought together by their love for drag, and the group's goal is to spread fun, perform in clubs, spread drag culture and awareness of its existence. They find inspiration for drag, among other places, at Eurovision.

On 10 December 2024, it was announced that Harem Girls would participate in the Pesma za Evroviziju '25 with the song "Aladin". The song was composed and arranged by Nemanja Antonić, while Ivan Vukajlović, Katarina Đulić, Sanja Vučić and Tito Furejra wrote the lyrics. Some personalities criticized their appearance in the contest, including Sloba Radanović, Lepa Lukić, Mina Kostić and Marko Bulat, regarding their involvement in drag. The group qualified for the final from the first semi-final on 25 February 2025, and after the final it was revealed that they had finished fifth in the semi-final. They placed second in the final, with second place in the public vote and fourth place in the jury vote.

On 3 December 2025, it was announced that Harem Girls and Ivana Krunić would participate in the Pesma za Evroviziju '26 with the song "Bom bom".

== Discography ==
=== Singles ===
- Dobrodošao u harem (2024)
- Aladin (2025)
- Aj na kafu (2025)
- Bom bom (2026)
