= Lavina (band) =

Serbian progressive metal band

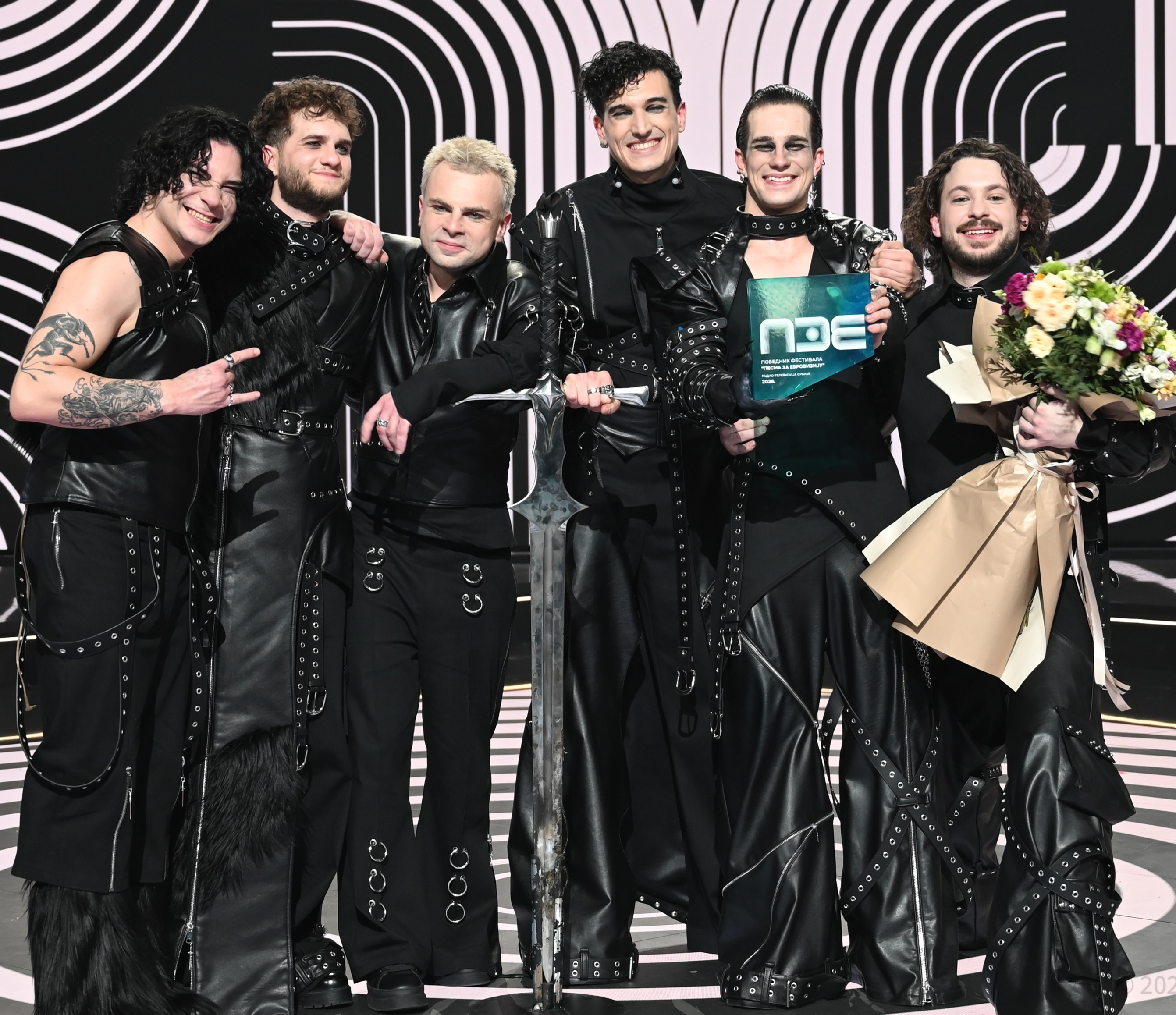
- From left to right: Petrović, Pavle Aranđelović, Ilić, Samardžić, Luka Aranđelović, Cvetanović

Background information
- Origin: Niš, Serbia
- Genres: progressive metal
- Years active: 2020–present
- Labels: LAVINA Records; Miracle of Bravery Records
- Members: Luka Aranđelović; Pavle Aranđelović; Andrija Cvetanović; Pavle Samardžić; Nikola Petrović; Bojan Ilić
- Website: lavina.band

Lavina (Serbian Cyrillic: Лавина, trans. Avalanche; stylised as LAVINA) is a Serbian progressive metal band from Niš, formed in 2020. The band consists of Luka Aranđelović, Pavle Aranđelović, Andrija Cvetanović, Pavle Samardžić, Nikola Petrović and Bojan Ilić. They released their debut studio album Odyssey in 2022. Their music is characterised by a combination of progressive metal with melodic passages, more complex rhythmic structures, and the occasional use of orchestral and choral elements.

They gained wider popularity in 2026 with the song "Kraj mene", with which they won Pesma za Evroviziju 2026. In the final of the competition, they received the maximum 12 points from both the professional jury and the public, for a total of 24 points, thereby becoming Serbia's representatives at the Eurovision Song Contest 2026 in Vienna and the first metal act to represent Serbia at the contest. At Eurovision, they finished 17th in the grand final. Following the contest, they announced a regional and European tour, and in September 2026 released the single "Fall Apart".

== Name ==
The band struggled with choosing a name for months, until on one occasion Andrija Cvetanović opened a book from The Witcher series and randomly pointed to the word "lavina", from which the band took its name.

== Career ==
=== Formation and Odyssey (2020–2023) ===
Lavina was formed in mid-2020 in Niš, and the original lineup consisted of Luka Aranđelović, Andrija Cvetanović, Pavle Samardžić, Nikola Petrović and Pavle Aranđelović. Almost all of the members had taken part in other musical projects before Lavina, while Luka Aranđelović and Cvetanović had wanted to form a band together since childhood and played in several groups while growing up. One of those groups eventually developed into Lavina, whose lineup changed several times during work on the first album. In its initial period, the band did not perform or present itself on social media, instead directing most of its activity toward writing and recording original material for its debut album.

The band's first release was the single "Id", released on 16 October 2022, followed by the song "Myopic" on 6 November. The debut studio album Odyssey was released digitally on 18 November of the same year and contains eight tracks. The material was recorded in three studios, while mixing and mastering were handled by Polish audio engineer Sebastian Has, who had also worked on releases by the Polish metal band Behemoth. Music videos were also recorded for the songs "Id" and "Attrition".

Following the period devoted to studio work, Lavina held its first concert on 25 February 2023 at the Niš club "Istina mašina", as part of the concert promotion of the album Odyssey, with the Niš band Bitter Taste as the opening act. Shortly after the first performance, drummer Bojan Ilić joined the band, forming the six-member lineup that continued to operate in the following years.

=== International performances and new releases (2023–2025) ===
Following their first concert and the promotion of the album Odyssey, Lavina began performing more intensively in Serbia and abroad during 2023. In addition to concerts in larger cities in Serbia, the band performed in Zagreb as part of the Wacken Metal Battle competition. In October, together with the Bulgarian metal band Deadscape, they held their first series of concerts in Bulgaria, performing in Sofia, Plovdiv, Varna and Burgas. The concerts in Bulgaria were held on 6 and 7 October in Sofia and Plovdiv, followed by 20 and 21 October in Varna and Burgas.

During the first half of 2024, the band held its first extended tour, which included performances in Belgrade, Novi Sad, Bratislava, Sofia and Plovdiv. In May, Lavina organised the first edition of the international festival Asymmetry Fest in Niš, with the intention of contributing to the development of the local alternative and metal scene. In the same month, the band also performed at the music showcase festival Spike Music Showcase in Plovdiv. One of Lavina's more notable performances during this period took place on 26 July 2024 at the seventeenth edition of the Artmania Festival in Sibiu, Romania. The Sibiu performance also marked the beginning of the next series of European concerts, during which the band performed in Budapest, Kraków, Chorzów, Ostrava, Brno and Prague.

Alongside their concert activities, the band began releasing new material intended for their next studio release. The single "In Your Absence" was released on 1 August 2024, while "Iron Will" followed on 26 November of the same year. The latter song was produced by Lavina and Nenad Tasić, while mixing and mastering were handled by Sava Tomić. The third single from this period, "this, too, will pass.", was released on 18 March 2025. Production was again credited to the members of the band and Tasić, with mixing and mastering by Tomić. At the beginning of 2025, Lavina performed at the Dutch festival and music conference Eurosonic Noorderslag in Groningen, as part of a programme dedicated to emerging European artists. In April, they took part in the Tallinn Music Week festival in Tallinn, where they performed on a programme dedicated to metal music. In Serbia, they performed on the Garden Stage at Arsenal Fest in Kragujevac on 27 June, while in August they performed at Hungary's Sziget Festival. At the end of the same month, they also performed on the main stage of the Belgrade Beer Fest at Ušće in Belgrade.

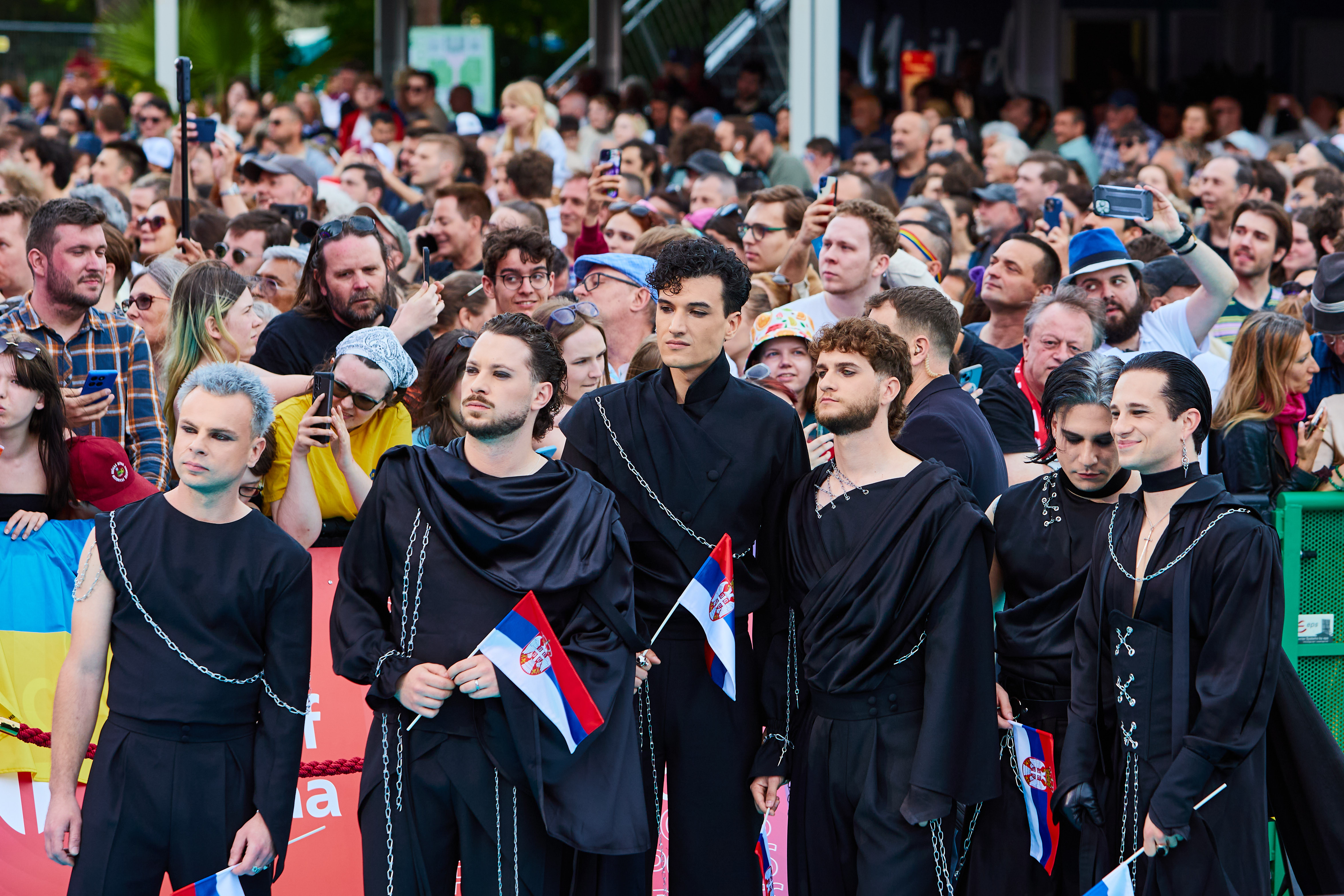
Lavina on the turquoise carpet of the Eurovision Song Contest 2026 in Vienna.

Performing "Kraj mene" in the first semi-final of the Eurovision Song Contest 2026.

=== Pesma za Evroviziju and Eurovision Song Contest (2026) ===
Radio Television of Serbia announced on 3 December 2025 that Lavina, with the song "Kraj mene", was among the 24 selected entries to participate in Pesma za Evroviziju 2026. The music and arrangement were credited to the members of the band, while the lyrics were written by the members of Lavina and Ivan Jegdić. The song was not originally written for the competition, but was planned as part of the band's next studio album and initially had English-language lyrics. The members subsequently adapted it into Serbian after deciding to enter Pesma za Evroviziju; "Kraj mene" also became the first song the band released in their native language.

Lavina performed in the second semi-final of the festival on 26 February, as the last, twelfth act of the competitive portion, and qualified as one of the seven participants who advanced to the final. In the final on 28 February, they performed in position 11. Under a system in which the votes of the professional jury and the public were weighted 50:50, Lavina received the maximum 12 points from both voting groups and won the festival with a total of 24 points. With the victory, they were selected as Serbia's representatives at the Eurovision Song Contest 2026 in Vienna and became the first metal act to represent Serbia in the competition.

As part of promotional activities ahead of Eurovision, the band released an English-language version of the song, followed by a symphonic version as part of the Eurovision project A Little Bit More. The RTS Symphony Orchestra and the RTS Choir took part in recording the symphonic version, under the baton of Olga Biserčić, while the arrangement was written by Lana Janjanin. The music video was filmed at mts Hall in a production by RTS.

At the 70th Eurovision Song Contest, Lavina performed in the first semi-final on 12 May as the last, fifteenth contestant. The stage performance was directed by Milica Soldatović Mikić, while during rehearsals the production team adapted the choreography and stage elements to the conditions of the Vienna production. Serbia finished fifth in the first semi-final with 187 points, of which 56 came from the professional juries and 131 from the public. Based on the public vote alone, Lavina placed third, and in the televote they received the maximum 12 points from Greece, Lithuania, Croatia and Montenegro. By placing among the top ten in the semi-final, the band qualified for the grand final on 16 May, in which they performed in position nine. Lavina received a total of 90 points in the final and finished 17th among 25 finalists. They received 38 points from the professional juries and 52 from the public; they received 12 points each from the Croatian and Montenegrin juries, as well as from the public in those two countries.

=== After Eurovision (2026–present) ===
Following their participation in the Eurovision Song Contest 2026, Lavina continued their concert activities in Serbia and abroad. On 25 June 2026, the band performed on the main stage of Arsenal Fest in Kragujevac. During July, they canceled their performance at the Bulgarian rock and metal festival Hills of Rock in Plovdiv just days before the event, while on 16 August they played on the main stage of the Nišville Jazz Festival, in a programme dedicated to the Niš rock scene. The period following Eurovision was also accompanied by an increase in the band's listenership on digital platforms. According to data published by RTS on 14 August, the song "Kraj mene" had by then recorded around five million streams on Spotify. Representatives of the band described Eurovision as a turning point that enabled their previous work to reach a significantly wider international audience. At the same time, they continued work on their second studio album, the writing of which had begun even before their participation in Pesma za Evroviziju. According to the band members, the songs prepared for the album are mostly in English, as they were written before the song "Kraj mene", while they left open the possibility of continuing to create in Serbian in the future.

The band's first new single after Eurovision, "Fall Apart", was released on 4 September 2026. The song was recorded with British record producer Rhys May, who had previously worked with artists such as Muse, Bring Me the Horizon and Three Days Grace. The music video was directed by Jasmin Cvišić, while Džejlan Ibrahimović served as director of photography. "Fall Apart" also represents the band's return to English-language songs following the Serbian and English versions of "Kraj mene" and its symphonic arrangement.

For autumn 2026, Lavina announced a regional and then a wider European tour. According to the schedule published in early September, the tour was set to begin on 15 September with a concert in Timișoara, followed by announced performances in Banja Luka, Novi Sad, Belgrade and Zagreb. Concerts were announced for October, November and December in several European cities, including Bucharest, Milan, London, Amsterdam, Berlin, Stockholm, Helsinki, Tallinn, Vilnius, Warsaw and Vienna, where the tour was planned to end on 10 December. Romanian singer Alexandra Căpitănescu was announced as a special guest on the first part of the tour. During the same period, the band also announced the release of their second studio album.

== Musical style and influences ==
Lavina's music is most commonly classified as progressive metal, or as its more modern variant. Reviewing the debut album Odyssey, Sava Karadžić highlighted the pronounced use of memorable guitar riffs and more complex compositional structures, while assessing that the band's approach differs from more traditional progressive metal based on the sound of bands such as Dream Theater, Queensrÿche and Fates Warning. The organisers of the Romanian Artmania Festival described their sound as a combination of heavier metal elements with melodic passages and rhythms inspired by Eastern music, with occasional use of orchestral and choral elements.

Performing in the grand final of the Eurovision Song Contest 2026.

The band members have not singled out one musical direction or group as decisive in shaping their sound. Luka Aranđelović stated in 2024 that while writing the first album they did not seek to place themselves within a particular genre, but that the progressive character of the music arose as a result of the members' different musical tastes and approaches to composition, with the members listening to other genres in addition to different styles of metal. Two years later, the band reiterated that each member has their own musical influences, whose impact is first reflected in their individual writing styles and then in the material they create together. As the most significant direct influence from the local Niš scene, they singled out the former metal band Styptic, whose music and acceptance among the local audience, according to the band, showed them at the beginning of their career that there was room for that kind of musical expression in their surroundings.

The band's sound gradually changed over subsequent releases. While Odyssey was characterised by longer compositions, more ambitious arrangements and uneven rhythms, the singles "Iron Will" and "this, too, will pass." showed a move toward a shorter and more compact form while retaining elements of progressive metal. This approach was further developed in the song "Kraj mene", which combines more atmospheric and melodic passages with heavier guitar riffs and harsh vocals. According to the band members, their lyrics are most often based on personal experiences, events and emotions, which they then rework within the songs. In addition to the music, the band places importance on its visual identity and stage performance. Aranđelović identified image, costumes, lighting, visual elements and performance energy as integral parts of Lavina's concert expression, stating that the visual aspects should complement the music and serve as an additional means of expressing the band's ideas. This approach was present as early as the promotion of the album Odyssey, for which music videos were recorded for the songs "Id" and "Attrition", and later became more pronounced in the band's concert and television performances.

== Members ==
=== Current ===
- Luka Aranđelović – vocals
- Pavle Aranđelović – keyboards, backing vocals
- Pavle Samardžić – guitar
- Andrija Cvetanović – guitar
- Nikola Petrović – bass
- Bojan Ilić – drums

== Discography ==
=== Studio albums ===
List of albums
Title	Details
Odyssey	Released: 18 November 2022; Label: Miracle of Bravery Records; Formats: Digital download, streaming

=== Singles ===
List of singles
Title	Year	Album
"Id"	2022	Odyssey
"Myopic"	2022	Odyssey
"In Your Absence"	2024	Non-album singles
"Iron Will"	2024	Non-album singles
"This, too, will pass."	2025	Non-album singles
"Kraj mene"	2026	Non-album singles
"Fall Apart"	2026	TBA

Awards and achievements
Preceded by Princ with "Mila"	Serbia in the Eurovision Song Contest; 2026	Succeeded by TBA
