= Dragana Kosjerina =

Serbian journalist and TV anchor

Dragana Kosjerina Perduv
- Драгана Косјерина Пердув
- Dragana Kosjerina Perduv
- Born: Dragana Kosjerina; August 22, 1987 (age 39); Sarajevo, SR Bosnia and Herzegovina, SFR Yugoslavia
- Occupations: journalist, television presenter, model
- Years active: 2011–present
- Television: Radio Television of Serbia
- Spouse: Bojan Perduv (m. 2024)

Dragana Kosjerina Perduv (née Kosjerina, Serbian Cyrillic: Драгана Косјерина Пердув, pronounced [drǎɡana kosjěrina perduv]; born August 22, 1987) is a Serbian journalist and TV anchor. She currently works at Radio Television of Serbia (RTS).

== Biography ==
Dragana Kosjerina Perduv was born on August 22, 1987, in Sarajevo, from where she moved to Belgrade at the age of 5. She first worked as a model, starting her career at the age of 17. After a series of successes, in 2004 she won the title and was one of the top models of the Models agency. She wanted to be a dentist, and although she graduated from the School of Dental Technology as an excellent student, she decided to enroll in psychology at the Faculty of Philosophy, but she did not succeed, so she enrolled in the Faculty of Culture and Media, where she successfully graduated, and then completed her master's academic studies at the UNESCO Chair for Cultural Policy and Management at the University of Arts in Belgrade. Since 2022 she has been the host of Pesma za Evroviziju, Serbia's national final for Eurovision. In 2024, she married dentist Bojan Perduv, and then added his surname to her.
