= Zejna (singer) =

Serbian singer (born 1986)

Zejna Зејна
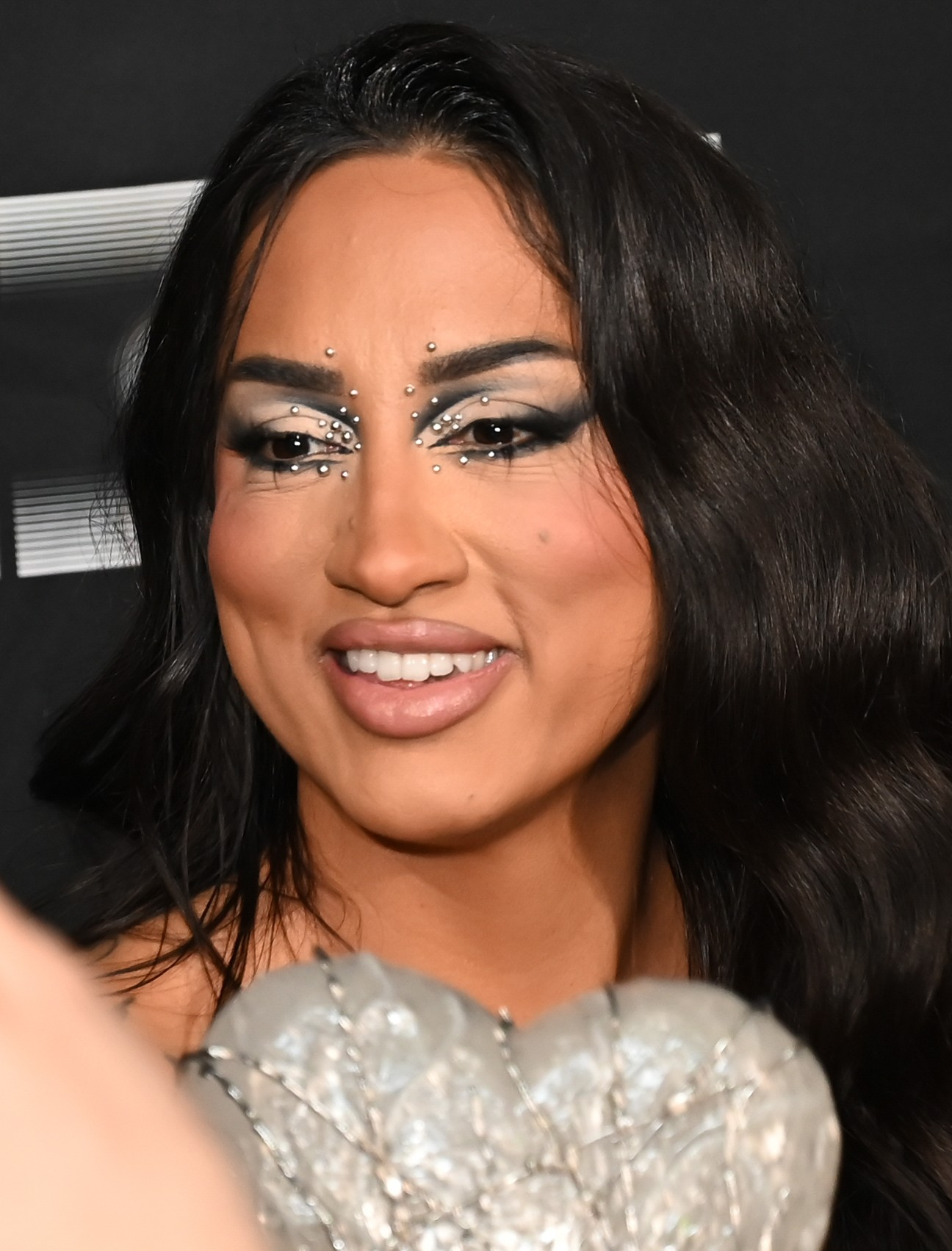

Background information
- Born: Zejna Murkić; 28 December 1986 (age 39); Loznica, SR Serbia, SFR Yugoslavia
- Genres: Pop; R'n'B
- Occupation: Singer
- Years active: 2009—present
- Formerly of: Luna

Zejna Murkić (Serbian Cyrillic: Зејна Муркић; born 28 December 1986), known mononymously as Zejna, is a Serbian singer. She was a member of the pop band Luna from 2009 to 2010, after which she went solo.

== Early life ==
Of Romani origin, Zejna Murkić was born on 28 December 1986, in Loznica. She has been singing and dancing since early childhood, and she had her first performances when she was only 10 years old. At the age of 16, she began singing professionally and performing throughout the country and abroad.

== Career ==
Zejna began her career in the competition Operacija trijumf, from which she quickly dropped out, but immediately after this TV program she received an invitation from Čeda Čvorak, the founder of the group Luna. From 2009 to 2010, she was a member of Luna, with whom she recorded two albums, Da san ne prestaje and Sex on the Beach. As the lead vocalist in the group, she sang some of the most notable tracks on these albums, such as "Panika", "Vrištim u sebi", "Klela bih" and "Alo, alo".

At the end of 2010, Zejna left the group and decided to devote herself to a solo career. In June 2011, she released her first single in English entitled "Tonight" in collaboration with Dee Monk. In the same year, she also released her first solo single in the Serbian language, called "Najbolja", which she composed and penned by herself. In 2012, she released the single "Drama", which she sang together with Slađa Delibašić and rapper Sha. In the same year, she participated in the Vrnjačka Banja festival, where she won the prize of the newspaper jury. In the meantime, she began writing songs for other artists and also sings backing vocals. In 2013, she released the single "Absinthe".

Zejna sings the song "Ruška" in the scene of the film Toma (2021) as well as the Romani song "Jag".

=== Pesma za Evroviziju ===
Zejna participated in the Pesma za Evroviziju '22 with the song "Nema te" and entered the final of this competition. The melody was written by Vladimir Maraš and the lyrics by Sanja Perić. Aca Sofronijević played the accordion. In 2023, she participated in Pesma za Evroviziju '23 with the song "Rumba", which finished seventh place in the final, and was originally made for a musical.

On 21 December 2023, Zejna was announced among the participants of Pesma za Evroviziju '24, the Serbian national final for the Eurovision Song Contest 2024, with the song "Najbolja". The song qualified for the final. She participated at Pesma za Evroviziju '26 with the song "Jugoslavija", finishing second overall.

== Discography ==
=== Extended plays ===
- Nova rasa (2024)

=== Singles ===
Title	Year	Album
"Absinthe"	2019	Non-album singles
"Osmi dan"	2020	Non-album singles
"Nema te"	2022	Non-album singles
"Petak"	2022	Non-album singles
"Bez sjaja"	2023	Non-album singles
"Kriva sam"	2023	Non-album singles
"Rumba"	2023	Non-album singles
"Najbolja"	2024	Non-album singles
"Jugoslavija"	2026	Non-album singles

=== Guest appearances ===
Title	Year	Artist	Album
"With you"	2016	Tamara Knight	Tamara Knight
"Rastavit nas neće nikad"	2020	Adis Ibrahimović	Non-album single
