= Saška Janković =

YANX, Sashka Yanx
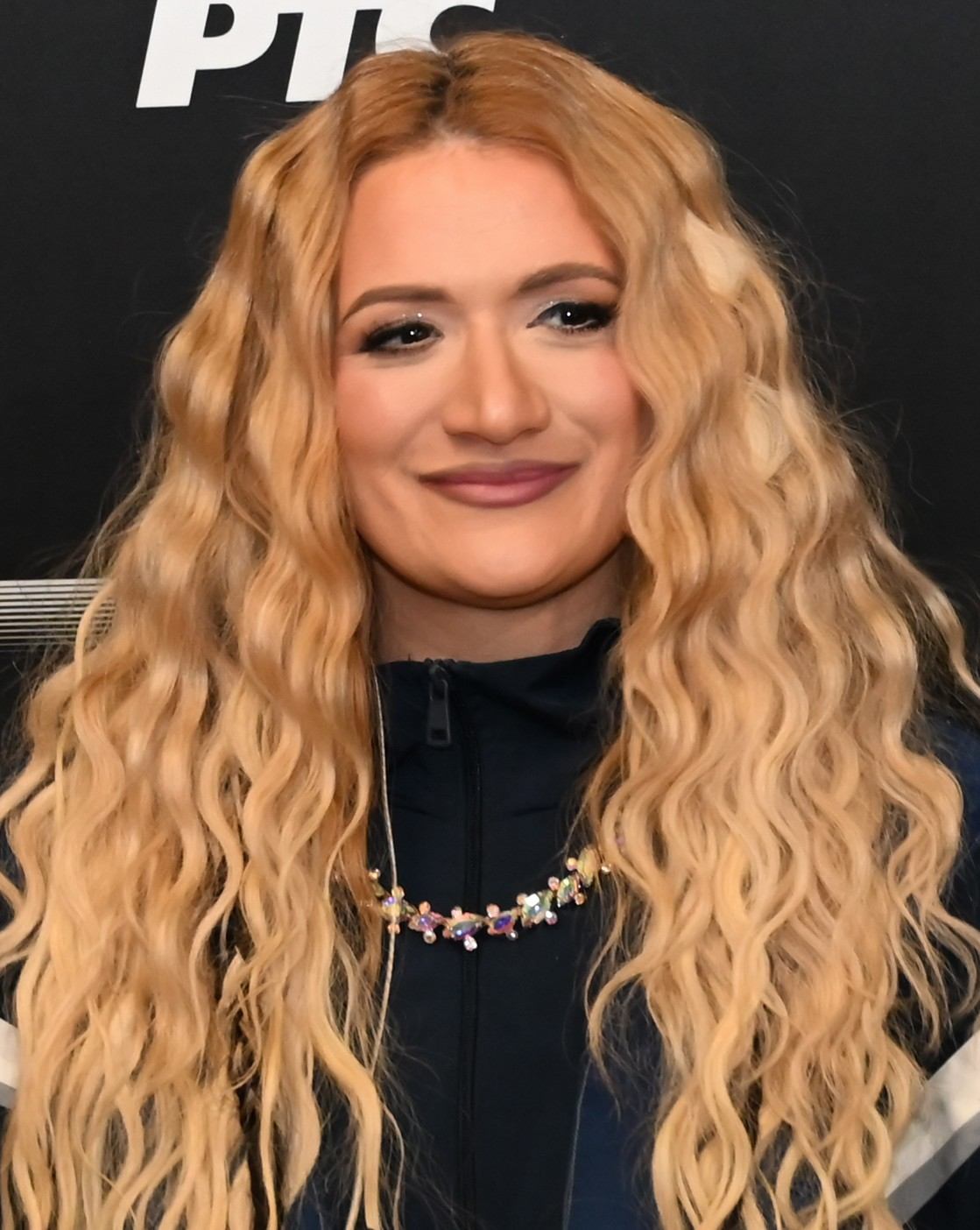

Background information
- Also known as: YANX, Sashka Yanx, Miss Jukebox, Saška Janković
- Born: Aleksandra Mirjana Mona Janković; 29 April 1988 (age 38); Smederevo, SR Serbia, SFR Yugoslavia
- Genres: Pop, soul, R&B, electro-pop, dance-pop, pop rock, jazz
- Occupations: Singer–songwriter, composer, producer
- Instruments: Vocals, piano, violin
- Years active: 2004–present
- Website: Official Website

Aleksandra Janković (Serbian Cyrillic: Александра Јанковић; born 29 April 1988), professionally known as YANX, Sashka Yanx (Сашка Јанкс) and Miss Jukebox, is a Serbian singer-songwriter, producer and more. She was previously a backing vocalist for numerous other artists, including Milan Stanković at the Eurovision Song Contest 2010, Nina Radojičić at the Eurovision Song Contest 2011 and Bojana Stamenov at the Eurovision Song Contest 2015. In 2012, Janković participated in Prvi glas Srbije, a musical talent show similar to The Voice.

== Life and career ==
=== Early life and career: 1988–2009 ===
Janković was born in 1988 in Smederevo (Yugoslavia then, Serbia now). When she was a child, she started playing the violin, but later switched to the piano. Janković cited jazz, pop and rock music as her musical influences. As a teenager, she participated in the RTS talents competition 3K dur. Janković then on to compete at the SunFlower Festival in Zrenjanin in 2006 and 2007, the 2007 Art Zone Festival in Bulgaria, and the 2008 PAN Music Festival, where she was honoured as the Best Newcomer.

=== Career development: 2009–11 ===
In March 2009, Janković took part in the Beovizija 2009, Serbian national selection for the Eurovision Song Contest 2009, with the song "Nauči me" (English: Teach Me). The semifinal event was held on March 8. In the final, Janković performed the fourth and finished the eighth with six points. On 18 April 2009, she performed at the humanitarian concert "Darujte život" (English: Give Life) in Smederevo. On 1 July, Janković performed "Bože pravde", the national anthem of Serbia, alongside two more singers at the opening ceremony of the 2009 Summer Universiade, which was held in Belgrade. She would also sing the "Bože pravde" at the reception of Serbia national basketball team who had won the silver medal at the EuroBasket 2009.

In May 2010, Janković sang backing vocals for Milan Stanković at the Eurovision Song Contest 2010. Along with Nikola Sarić, she took part in the Sunčane Skale Festival in Herceg Novi, Montenegro, with the song "Uhvati dan" (English: Seize the Day). In December, Janković performed "Bože pravde" at the celebration honouring the Serbia Davis Cup team's win of the 2010 Davis Cup. In 2011, she once again sang backing vocals at the Eurovision Song Contest, this time for Nina Radojičić. In June, Janković acted as a member of the jury at the talents competition Staropramen. She also performed along with the pianist and composer Aleksandar Saša Lokner at the Summer at Gardoš Festival in August.

=== Upcoming studio album and Prvi glas Srbije: 2011–present ===
In December 2011, Janković officially adopted "Miss Jukebox" as her artistic name, and announced the release of her new single "Nikome nije lako" (English: It Is Easy to No One). The video for the song features popular Serbian musicians such as Dragoljub Đuričić, Vukašin Brajić and Nikola Sarić.

In 2012, Janković participated in the second season of the talent show Prvi glas Srbije (The First Voice of Serbia), adapted from The Voice. She successfully went through the blind audition and the battle phase to progress to the live performances. However, Janković was eliminated in the sixth round of live performances, having received fewest public votes. She had previously once been nominated for elimination, but was saved by the judges Vlado Georgiev, Aleksandra Radović and Saša Milošević Mare. While on Prvi glas Srbije, Janković performed live the following songs:

- Vasilija Radojčić — "Mito bekrijo"
- Šaban Bajramović — "Đelem, đelem"
- Jennifer Lopez feat. Pitbull — "Dance Again"
- Negative — "Zbunjena"
- Celine Dion — "Because You Loved Me"
- Christina Aguilera, Pink, Lil' Kim and Mýa — "Lady Marmalade"
- Smak — "Daire" / Jennifer Hudson — "One Night Only"

On 25 December 2012, three days after Janković had been eliminated from Prvi glas Srbije, Jennifer Hudson tweeted, "@Miss_Jukebox great job", praising her performance of "One Night Only". In January 2013, Janković released her new single "Ćošak" (English: Corner).

In February 2013, Janković took part in Beosong 2013, Serbian national election for the Eurovision Song Contest 2013, with the song "Duga u tvojim očima" (English: The Rainbow in Your Eyes). In the competition she reached third place.

In 2018, she once again tried to represent Serbia at Eurovision Song Contest 2018 with the song "Pesma za tebe". She came 2nd at the preselection, Beovizija 2018. She returned to Beovizija in 2019 with her song Da Li Čuješ Moj Glas and got the 3rd place.

On 21 December 2023, she was announced among the participants of Pesma za Evroviziju '24, the Serbian national final for the Eurovision Song Contest 2024, with the song "Kolo". The song failed to qualify for the final.

== Personal life ==
Janković's father, Dobrica Janković, was a member of the Serbian parliament from 2004 to 2007.

Janković stated she was "very attracted" to learning foreign language and that she would like to study Portuguese. She eventually enrolled journalism at the University of Belgrade.

== Discography ==
=== Singles ===
- 2009 — "Nauči me"
- 2010 — "Uhvati dan" (feat. Nikola Sarić)
- 2011 — "Nikome nije lako"
- 2013 — "Ćošak"
- 2013 — "Duga u tvojim očima"
- 2013 — "Ono kad"
- 2014 — "Ponekad"
- 2014 — "Spavaj"
- 2018 — "Pesma za tebe"
- 2019 — "Da li čuješ moj glas"
- 2020 — "Ali ali"
- 2021 — "Udahni" (as member of O2)
- 2021 — "Sori not sori"
- 2023 — "Bejbi bejbi"
- 2024 — "Kolo"

== Awards and nominations ==
Year	Award	Category	City	Result
1998	Festival for young talents	Winner, Best vocals	Smederevo, Serbia	Won
2006	Sunflower Festival	Finals (Pod maskama)	Belgrade, Serbia	Nominated
2007	Sunflower Festival	Finals (Poslednje pismo)	Belgrade, Serbia	Nominated
2008	PAN Music Festival	Best Newcomer (Bolesni od ljubavi)	Pančevo, Serbia	Won
2008	ArtZone Festival	Special guest (Pod maskama, Could you remember me, Arrogant sea)	Sofia, Bulgaria	
2009	Beovizija	Best Song (Nauči me)	Belgrade, Serbia	Nominated
2014	STARI GRAD Festival	Best lyrics (Spavaj)	Novi Pazar, Serbia	Won
2013	Beosong	Best Song (Duga u tvojim očima)	Belgrade, Serbia	Nominated
2018	Beovizija	Best Song (Pesma za tebe)	Belgrade, Serbia	Nominated
2019	Beovizija	Best Song (Da li čuješ moj glas)	Belgrade, Serbia	Nominated
2024	Pesma za Evroviziju	Best Song (Kolo)	Belgrade, Serbia	Nominated
2026	Pesma za Evroviziju	Best Song (Srušio si sve)	Belgrade, Serbia	Nominated

== See also ==
- Beovizija 2009
- Serbia in the Eurovision Song Contest
- Prvi glas Srbije
- Prvi glas Srbije (series 2)
- Serbia in the Eurovision Song Contest 2009
- Serbia in the Eurovision Song Contest 2010
- Serbia in the Eurovision Song Contest 2011
- Serbia in the Eurovision Song Contest 2013
- Serbia in the Eurovision Song Contest 2019
