= Serbia in the Eurovision Song Contest 2023 =

- Eurovision Song Contest 2023
- Participating broadcaster: Radio Television of Serbia (RTS)
- Country: Serbia
- Selection process: Pesma za Evroviziju '23
- Selection date: 4 March 2023

Competing entry
- Song: "Samo mi se spava"
- Artist: Luke Black
- Songwriters: Luka Ivanović

Placement
- Semi-final result: Qualified (10th, 37 points)
- Final result: 24th, 30 points

Participation chronology

Serbia was represented at the Eurovision Song Contest 2023 with the song "Samo mi se spava" performed by Luke Black. The Serbian national broadcaster, Radio Television of Serbia (RTS), organised the national final Pesma za Evroviziju '23 in order to select the Serbian entry for the 2023 contest. The final took place on 4 March 2023, with a combination of jury voting and televoting selecting Black to represent Serbia at the 2023 contest in Liverpool.

Serbia was drawn to compete in the first semi-final of the Eurovision Song Contest which took place on 9 May 2023 and was later selected to perform in position 3. At the end of the show, "Samo mi se spava" was announced among the top 10 entries of the first semi-final and hence qualified to compete in the final. It was later revealed that Serbia placed tenth out of the fifteen participating countries in the semi-final with 37 points. In the final, Serbia performed in position 5 and placed twenty-fourth out of the 26 participating countries, scoring a total of 30 points, marking Serbia's worst result ever in a Eurovision grand final.

== Background ==
Prior to the 2023 contest, Serbia has participated in the Eurovision Song Contest 14 times since its first entry in 2007, winning the contest with their debut entry "Molitva" performed by Marija Šerifović. Since 2007, 11 out of 14 of Serbia's entries have featured in the final with the nation failing to qualify in 2009, 2013 and 2017. Serbia's 2022 entry, "In corpore sano" performed by Konstrakta, qualified to the final and placed fifth.

The Serbian national broadcaster, Radio Television of Serbia (RTS), broadcasts the event within Serbia and organises the selection process for the nation's entry. The broadcaster confirmed Serbia's participation in the 2023 contest in Liverpool on 25 August 2022. Between 2007 and 2009, Serbia used the Beovizija national final in order to select their entry. However, after their 2009 entry, "Cipela" performed by Marko Kon and Milaan, failed to qualify Serbia to the final, the broadcaster shifted their selection strategy to selecting specific composers to create songs for artists. In 2010, RTS selected Goran Bregović to compose songs for a national final featuring three artists, while in 2011 Kornelije Kovač, Aleksandra Kovač and Kristina Kovač were tasked with composing one song each. In 2012, the internal selection of Željko Joksimović and the song "Nije ljubav stvar" secured the country's second highest placing in the contest to this point, placing third. In 2013, RTS returned to an open national final format and organized the Beosong competition. The winning entry, "Ljubav je svuda" performed by Moje 3, failed to qualify Serbia to the final. In 2015, RTS selected Vladimir Graić, the composer of Serbia's 2007 winning entry "Molitva", to compose songs for a national final featuring three artists. RTS internally selected the Serbian entries in 2016 and 2017 with the decision made by RTS music editors. In 2018 and 2019, RTS returned to using the Beovizija national final in order to select their entry, managing to qualify to the final on both occasions. In 2022, RTS returned to organising a national final under the name Pesma za Evroviziju '23. On 1 September 2022, RTS confirmed that Pesma za Evroviziju would be organised for a second time in order to select the country's entry to the 2023 contest.

== Before Eurovision ==
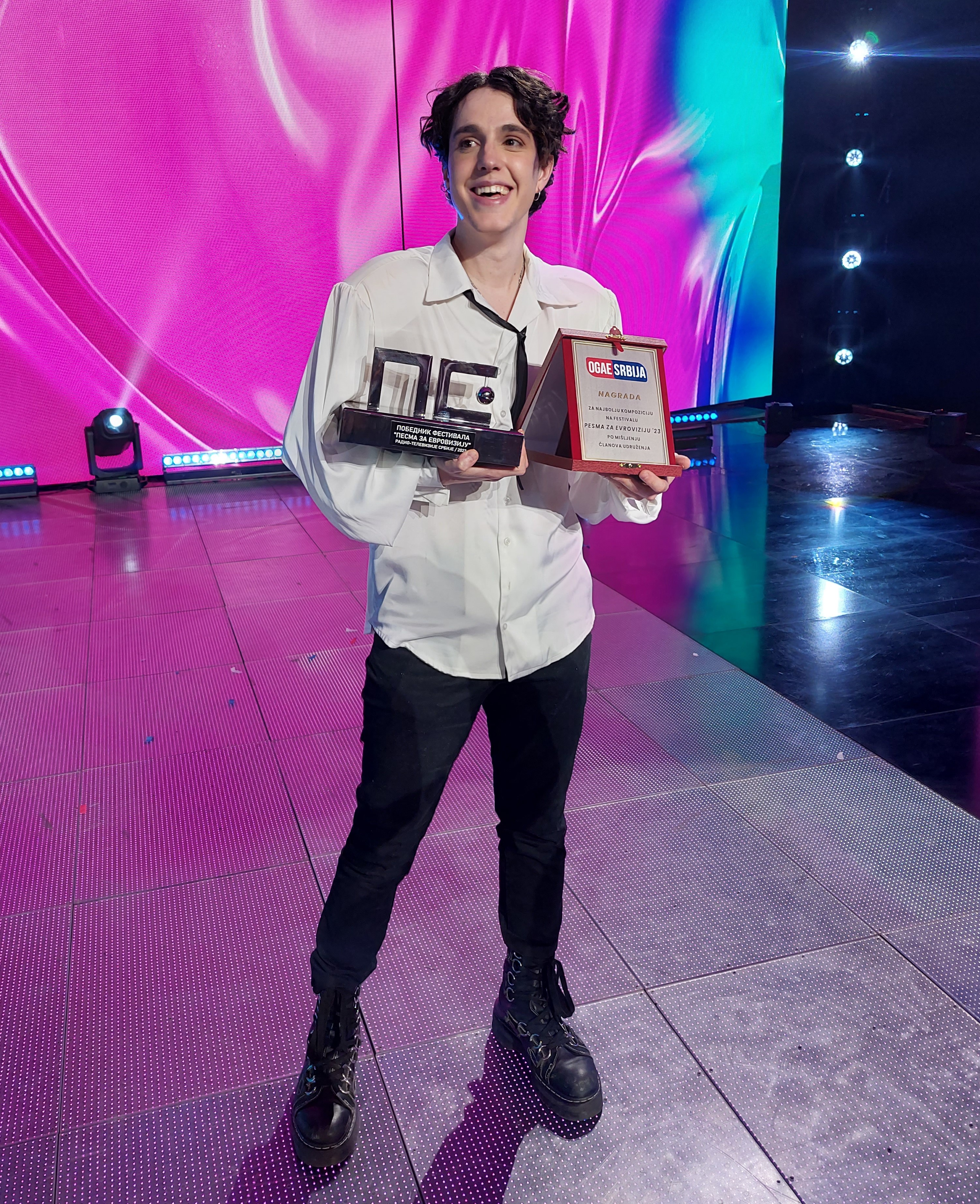
Luke Black was selected to represent Serbia at the Eurovision Song Contest 2023 in Liverpool.

=== Pesma za Evroviziju '23 ===
The 2023 edition of Pesma za Evroviziju featured two semi-finals and a final, and saw 32 acts compete. All three shows took place at Studios 8 and 9 of RTS in Košutnjak, Belgrade.

==== Semi-finals ====
The first semi-final took place on 1 March 2023. "Moj prvi ožiljak na duši" performed by Nađa, "Od jastuka do jastuka" performed by Stefan Shy, "Cvet sa Istoka" performed by Princ, "Novi plan drugi san" performed by Filip Baloš, "Svadba ili kavga" performed by Chegi & Braća Bluz Band, "Samo mi se spava" performed by Luke Black, "Indigo" performed by Empathy Soul Project and "Nedostupan" performed by Boris Subotić advanced to the final, while "Novi svet" performed by Mattia Zanatta & Angela Kassiani, "Mamim" performed by Tijana Dapčević, "Iza duge" performed by Igor Stanojević, "Lanac" performed by Angellina, "Vremenska zona" performed by Hercenšlus, "Presidente" performed by Savo Perović, "Osmeh" performed by Adem Mehmedović and "Čujemo se sutra" performed by Filip Žmaher were eliminated from the contest.

The second semi-final took place on 2 March 2023. "Greh" performed by Dzipsii, "Devojka tvog dečka" performed by Nadia, "Rumba" performed by Zejna, "Posle mene" performed by Filarri, "Neka, neka" performed by Frajle, "Zumi zimi zami" performed by Hurricane, "Viva la Vida" performed by Duo Grand and "Liberta" performed by Gift advanced to the final, while "Ako shvatim kasno" performed by Egret, "Starac dana" performed by Eegor, "Fenomen" performed by Milan Bujaković, "Kao grom iz vedra neba" performed by Jelena Vlahović, "Zato što volim" performed by Igor Vins & Bane Lalić, "Loše procene" performed by Andjela, "U noćima" performed by Ivona and "Tišina" performed by Doris Milošević were eliminated from the contest.

==== Final ====
The final took place on 4 March 2023. The winner was selected based on the 50/50 combination of votes from five jurors and from a public televote.

Final – 4 March 2023
R/O	Artist	Song	Jury	Televote	Total	Place
1	Stefan Shy	"Od jastuka do jastuka"	7	4	11	6
2	Boris Subotić	"Nedostupan"	0	0	0	13
3	Nadia	"Devojka tvog dečka"	2	2	4	8
4	Duo Grand	"Viva la Vida"	0	0	0	13
5	Nađa	"Moj prvi ožiljak na duši"	12	6	18	3
6	Frajle	"Neka, neka"	0	0	0	13
7	Hurricane	"Zumi zimi zami"	0	1	1	12
8	Chegi & Braća Bluz Band	"Svadba ili kavga"	0	3	3	10
9	Dzipsii	"Greh"	5	8	13	5
10	Luke Black	"Samo mi se spava"	10	10	20	1
11	Filip Baloš	"Novi plan drugi san"	8	7	15	4
12	Princ	"Cvet sa Istoka"	6	12	18	2
13	Filarri	"Posle mene"	0	0	0	13
14	Gift	"Liberta"	4	0	4	9
15	Empathy Soul Project	"Indigo"	3	0	3	11
16	Zejna	"Rumba"	1	5	6	7

=== Send-off ceremony ===
On April 28, RTS prepared a ceremonial farewell of the Serbian representative to the Eurovision Song Contest 2023. The ceremony was attended by numerous guests, including the Ambassador of the United Kingdom to Serbia Sian MacLeod, the director of RTS Dragan Bujošević, as well as members of OGAE Serbia, fans of the competition, journalists and others. At the ceremony, the flag of the United Kingdom was given by the British ambassador to the Serbian representative, and the flag of Serbia was handed over to this year's representative by the last years'.

== At Eurovision ==
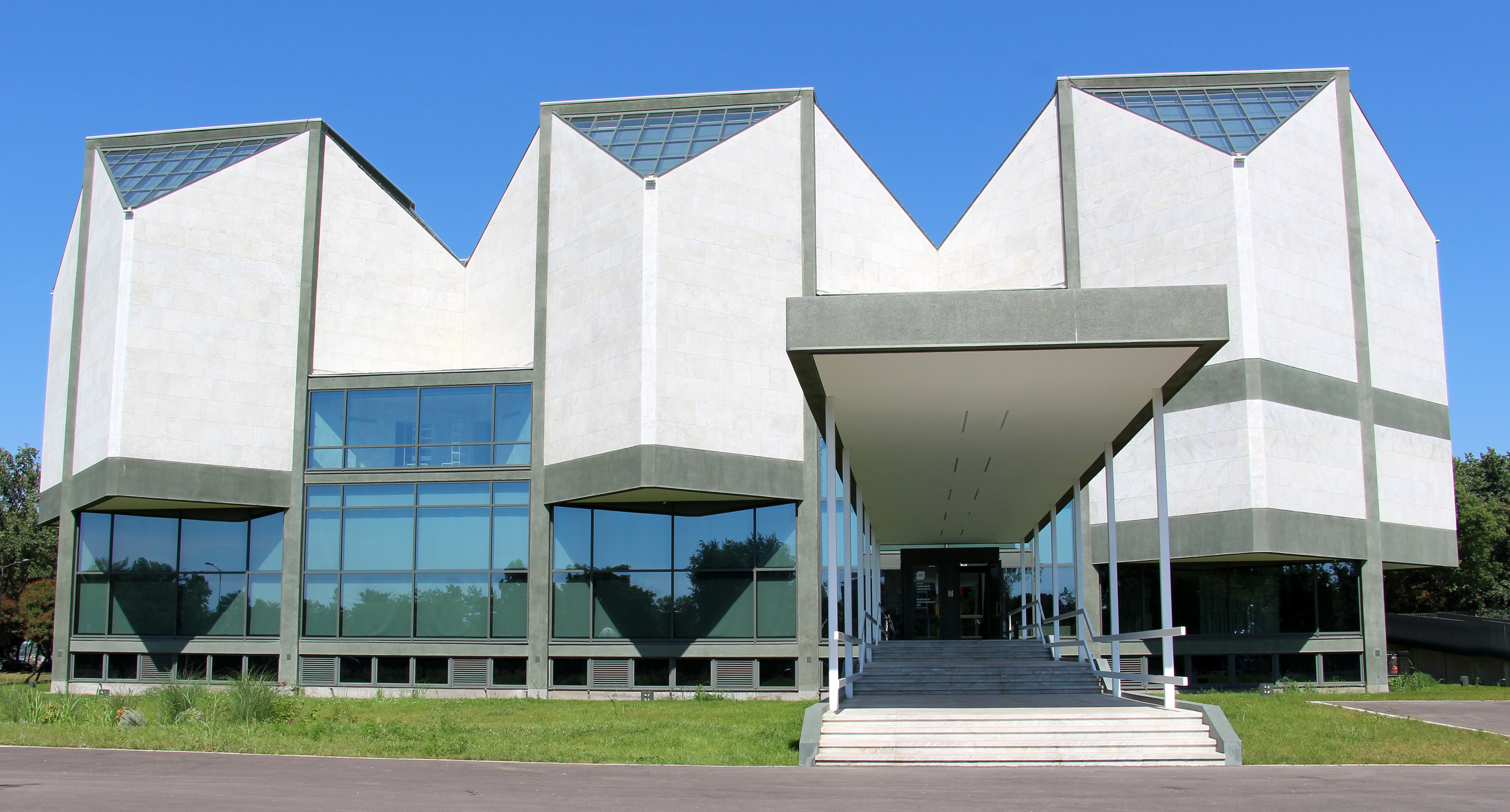
A video postcard introduced Luke Black's performance in the first semi-final and final of the Eurovision Song Contest 2023. The postcard was filmed at the Museum of Contemporary Art in Belgrade in March 2023 in collaboration with the host broadcaster BBC. The Park 3020 in Lviv and Tate Liverpool in the host city of Liverpool also featured in the Serbian postcard.

According to Eurovision rules, all nations with the exceptions of the host country and the "Big Five" (France, Germany, Italy, Spain and the United Kingdom) are required to qualify from one of two semi-finals in order to compete for the final; the top 10 countries from each semi-final progress to the final. The European Broadcasting Union (EBU) split up the competing countries into six different pots based on voting patterns from previous contests, with countries with favourable voting histories put into the same pot. On 31 January 2023, an allocation draw was held, which placed each country into one of the two semi-finals, and determined which half of the show they would perform in. Serbia was placed into the first semi-final, held on 9 May 2023, and was scheduled to perform in the first half of the show.

Once all the competing songs for the 2023 contest had been released, the running order for the semi-finals was decided by the shows' producers rather than through another draw, so that similar songs were not placed next to each other. Serbia was set to perform in position 3, following the entry from Malta and before the entry from Latvia. Immediately after the close of the second semi-final, a press conference was held in which each of the artists drew the half of the final of which they would perform in. Serbia was drawn into the first half of the final and was later selected by the EBU to perform in position number 5, following the entry from Poland and before the entry from France.

In Serbia, the two semi-finals were broadcast on RTS 3 and RTS Svet, with commentary by Duška Vučinić. Due to technical issues, Tijana Lukić commentated from Belgrade during the first 15 minutes of the first semi-final. The semi-finals were initially due to be broadcast on RTS 1, however, due to the Belgrade school shooting, broadcast of the semi-finals was deferred to RTS 3 to allow for news coverage on RTS 1. The final was broadcast on RTS 1, with further commentary by Duška Vučinić. The Serbian spokesperson, who announced the top 12-point score awarded by the Serbian jury during the final, was Dragana Kosjerina.

=== Semi-final ===
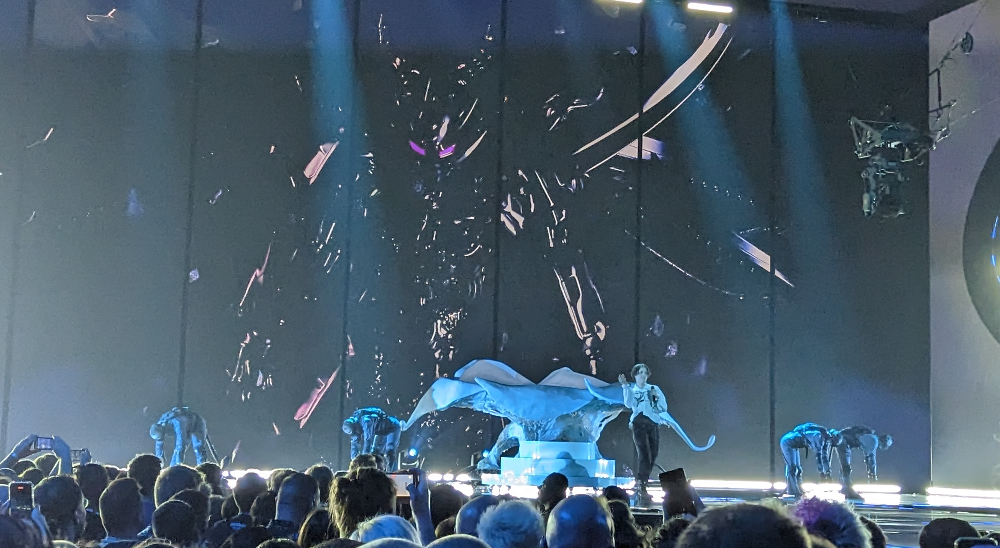
Luke Black during a rehearsal before the first semi-final

Luke Black took part in technical rehearsals on 30 April and 2 May, followed by dress rehearsals on 8 and 9 May. This included the jury show on 8 May where the professional back-up juries of each country watched and voted in a result used if any issues with public televoting occurred.

At the end of the show, Serbia was announced as having finished in the top 10 and subsequently qualifying for the grand final. It was later revealed that Serbia placed tenth out of the fifteen participating countries in the second semi-final with 37 points, qualifying by just 3 points over Latvia.

=== Final ===
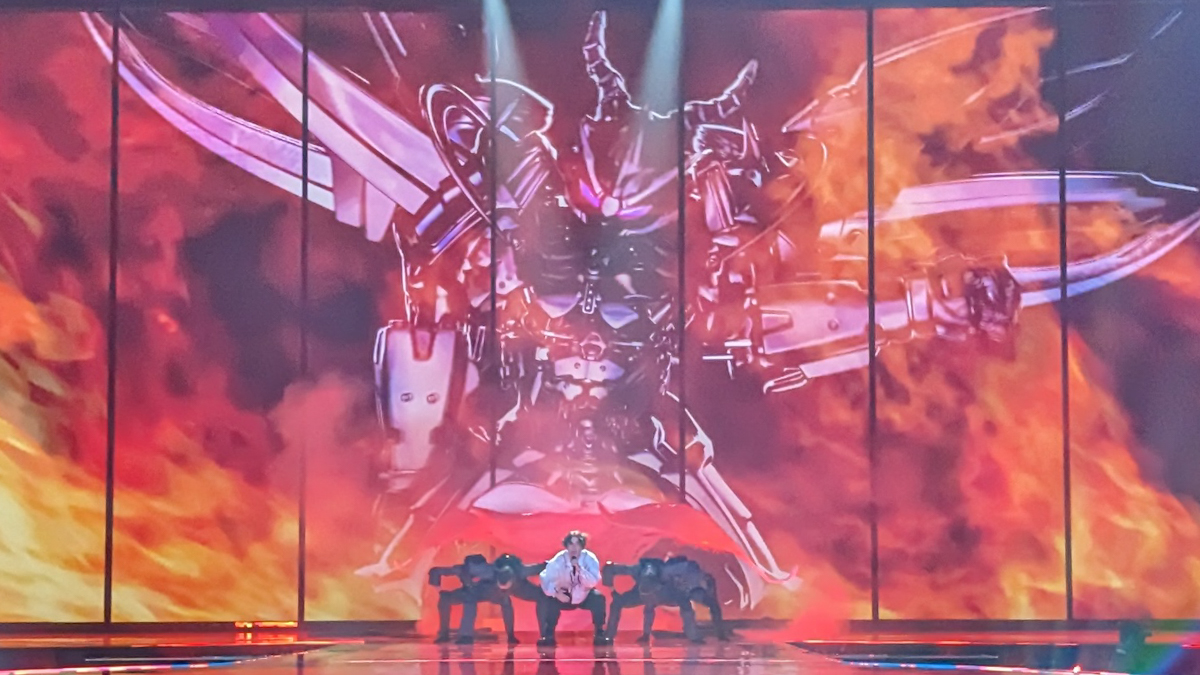
Luke Black during the jury final on 12 May 2023.

Shortly after the first semi-final, a winners' press conference was held for the ten qualifying countries. As part of this press conference, the qualifying artists took part in a draw to determine which half of the grand final they would subsequently participate in. This draw was done in the order the countries appeared in the semi-final running order. Serbia was drawn to compete in the first half. Following this draw, the shows' producers decided upon the running order of the final, as they had done for the semi-finals. Serbia was subsequently placed to perform in position number 5, following the entry from Poland and before the entry from France.

Luke Black once again took part in dress rehearsals on 12 and 13 May before the final, including the jury final where the professional juries cast their final votes before the live show on 12 May. He performed a repeat of his semi-final performance during the final on 13 May. Serbia placed 24th in the final, scoring 30 points; 16 points from the public televoting and 14 points from the juries. This marked Serbia's worst ever result in the final of the Eurovision Song Contest.

=== Voting ===
Below is a breakdown of points awarded to Serbia in the first semi-final and in the final. Voting during the three shows involved each country awarding sets of points from 1-8, 10 and 12: one from their professional jury and the other from televoting in the final vote, while the semi-final vote was based entirely on the vote of the public. The exact composition of the professional jury, and the results of each country's jury and televoting were released after the final. The Serbian jury consisted of Dragan Đorđević, Zoran Živanović, Konstrakta, who represented Serbia in the Eurovision Song Contest 2022, Sandra Perović and Sara Jo. In the first semi-final, Serbia placed 10th with 37 points. This marked Serbia's fifth consecutive qualification to the grand final. In the final, Serbia placed 24th with 30 points. Over the course of the contest, Serbia awarded its 12 points to Croatia in the first semi-final, and to Slovenia (jury) and Finland (televote) in the final.

==== Points awarded to Serbia ====
Points awarded to Serbia (Semi-final 1)
Score	Televote
12 points	
10 points	Croatia
8 points	
7 points	
6 points	Switzerland
5 points	Malta
4 points	Finland
3 points	Azerbaijan; Czechia
2 points	France; Rest of the World
1 point	Italy; Sweden

Points awarded to Serbia (Final)
Score	Televote	Jury
12 points		
10 points		
8 points		
7 points	Croatia	
6 points	Slovenia	
5 points		
4 points		Croatia; Portugal
3 points		Germany
2 points	Malta	
1 point	Switzerland	Greece; Iceland; Italy

==== Points awarded by Serbia ====
Points awarded by Serbia (Semi-final 1)
Score	Televote
12 points	Croatia
10 points	Finland
8 points	Czechia
7 points	Israel
6 points	Sweden
5 points	Norway
4 points	Moldova
3 points	Portugal
2 points	Latvia
1 point	Switzerland

Points awarded by Serbia (Final)
Score	Televote	Jury
12 points	Finland	Slovenia
10 points	Croatia	Israel
8 points	Slovenia	Croatia
7 points	Israel	Finland
6 points	Sweden	Austria
5 points	Norway	Sweden
4 points	Czechia	France
3 points	Austria	Spain
2 points	Italy	Italy
1 point	France	Czech Republic

==== Detailed voting results ====
Each nation's jury consisted of five music industry professionals who are citizens of the country they represent, with their names published before the contest to ensure transparency. This jury judged each entry based on: vocal capacity; the stage performance; the song's composition and originality; and the overall impression by the act. In addition, no member of a national jury was permitted to be related in any way to any of the competing acts in such a way that they cannot vote impartially and independently. The individual rankings of each jury member as well as the nation's televoting results were released shortly after the grand final.

The following members comprised the Serbian jury:

- Dragan Đorđević – music expert
- Zoran Živanović (Žika Zana) – keyboardist, producer
- Ana Đurić (Konstrakta) – singer-songwriter
- Sandra Perović – film critic, journalist
- Sara Jo – singer, model, actress

Detailed voting results from Serbia (Semi-final 1)
R/O	Country	Televote	
R/O	Country	Rank	Points
01	Norway	6	5
02	Malta	11	
03	Serbia		
04	Latvia	9	2
05	Portugal	8	3
06	Ireland	14	
07	Croatia	1	12
08	Switzerland	10	1
09	Israel	4	7
10	Moldova	7	4
11	Sweden	5	6
12	Azerbaijan	12	
13	Czechia	3	8
14	Netherlands	13	
15	Finland	2	10

Detailed voting results from Serbia (Final)
R/O	Country	Jury							Televote	
R/O	Country	Juror 1	Juror 2	Juror 3	Juror 4	Juror 5	Rank	Points	Rank	Points
01	Austria	3	7	6	2	19	5	6	8	3
02	Portugal	22	19	20	24	15	20		19	
03	Switzerland	12	18	17	15	13	15		18	
04	Poland	23	15	19	22	21	21		13	
05	Serbia									
06	France	7	5	7	10	5	7	4	10	1
07	Cyprus	16	17	16	7	8	12		15	
08	Spain	6	12	11	6	6	8	3	14	
09	Sweden	15	4	5	5	7	6	5	5	6
10	Albania	25	25	25	25	25	25		12	
11	Italy	11	9	10	8	9	9	2	9	2
12	Estonia	19	22	18	19	23	22		20	
13	Finland	2	3	3	20	4	4	7	1	12
14	Czechia	8	14	8	9	11	10	1	7	4
15	Australia	18	21	23	23	24	23		22	
16	Belgium	10	10	15	13	14	13		21	
17	Armenia	9	11	9	12	10	11		16	
18	Moldova	21	24	12	14	17	18		11	
19	Ukraine	14	13	13	18	18	17		24	
20	Norway	17	20	14	17	16	19		6	5
21	Germany	24	23	24	21	22	24		17	
22	Lithuania	20	16	22	11	12	16		25	
23	Israel	4	1	2	3	3	2	10	4	7
24	Slovenia	1	2	1	1	1	1	12	3	8
25	Croatia	5	6	4	4	2	3	8	2	10
26	United Kingdom	13	8	21	16	20	14		23	

=== Ratings ===
In Serbia, according to the Serbian commentator Duška Vučinić, a total of 2,000,000 people watched the final. On average, 673,706 people watched the final. The final recorded a share of around 29.5%, and a rating of around 10.2%.

The share for Luke Black's semi-final in Serbia was 8.43%, with a total viewership of 500,000 (according to Vučinić), and an average viewership of 227,186, with the other semi-final recording a share of 5.4%, with an average viewership of 149,391.
