= Luke Black =

Serbian singer-songwriter (born 1992)

Luke Black Лук Блек
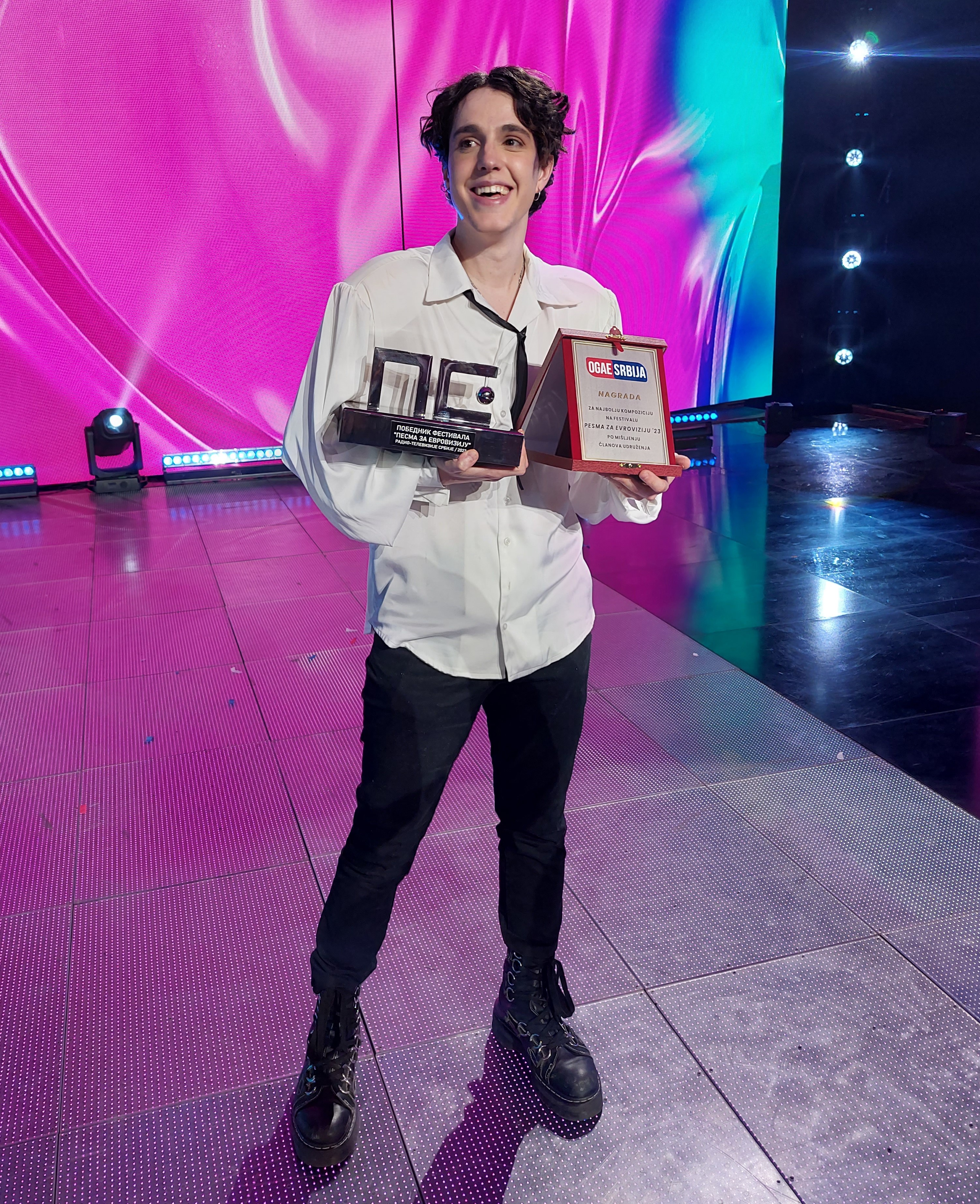
- Black at Pesma za Evroviziju '23, 2023

Background information
- Born: Luka Ivanović; 18 May 1992 (age 34); Čačak, Serbia, FR Yugoslavia
- Genres: Electropop; dream pop; synth-pop
- Occupations: Singer; songwriter
- Instruments: Vocals; piano
- Years active: 2014–present
- Label: Universal (former)
- Website: lukeblackmusic.com

Luka Ivanović (Serbian Cyrillic: Лука Ивановић; born 18 May 1992), known professionally as Luke Black (Serbian: Лук Блек / Luk Blek), is a Serbian singer and songwriter. Born in Čačak, he became the first Serbian artist to be signed under Universal Music Group, through which he released his debut EP, Thorns, in February 2015. He represented Serbia in the Eurovision Song Contest 2023 with the song "Samo mi se spava", placing 24th in the grand final. Described as the "Serbian pop alchemist", his music draws from a range of electropop and experimental pop music influences.

== Early life ==
Luka Ivanović was born on 18 May 1992 in Čačak, FR Yugoslavia. He pursued interest in music at the age of 12 when he started writing his own lyrics, and a couple of years later also began creating and producing music. After graduating from the Grammar School of Čačak, he relocated to Belgrade to study English language and literature at the University of Belgrade Faculty of Philology.

Ivanović stated that his stage name "Luke" comes from the anglicisation of his first name, while "Black" originates from when he as a teenager expressed forty days of mourning for the "death of the Serbian music scene".

== Career ==
=== 2010−2019: Career beginnings, Thorns and Neoslavic ===
His career began when the performance of his song "D-Generation" was noticed by the representatives of Universal Music Group, offering him a recording contract. He made his recording debut with the help from the Serbian music collective Zemlja Gruva. In 2014, Black released his first single "Nebula Lullaby" through Spinnup. In May the same year, he had his first live performance at the Belgrade Youth Center as a part of the Gruvlend Festival, which was organized by Zemlja Gruva to showcase new talents. "D-Generation" was officially released in February 2015 as the lead single to Black's debut EP. The music video for the single was uploaded through Vevo. "D-Generation" was followed by the second single "Holding on to Love" in May 2015. Thorns the EP was eventually released on 18 September 2015 under Universal. The following month, it was promoted at the Waves Vienna festival and Tvornica kulture in Zagreb, where Black served as the opening act for the band Lust For Youth.

In May 2016, Black released the standalone single "Demons", produced by Venza from Spain. The song was also nominated to represent Serbia in the Eurovision Song Contest 2016 in Stockholm, but Radio Television of Serbia ultimately went with "Goodbye (Shelter)" by Sanja Vučić. In June, to promote the single Black embarked on a solo tour in China, performing in Beijing, Shanghai and Guangzhou.

In April 2017, he performed at a fashion show during the Berlin Alternative Fashion Week, held at the Berghain nightclub. There he announced the release of his single "Walpurgis Night", produced by Swede Oscar Fogelström. Remastered versions of "Demons" and "Walpurgis Night" were included to his second EP Neoslavic, released in July 2018. Later that year, Black made an indefinite break from music.

=== 2020–2023: F23.8 and Eurovision Song Contest ===
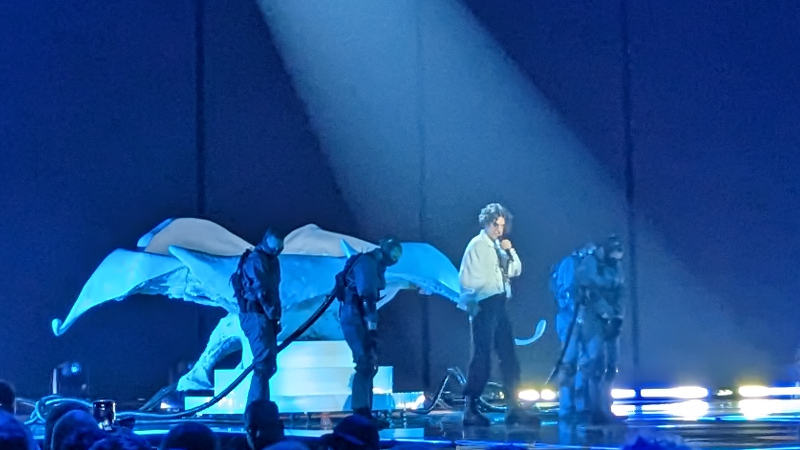
Luke Black in the semi-final of the Eurovision 2023

In April 2021, Black independently released "A House on the Hill", which was included on his EP F23.8.

In January 2023, he was announced as one of the contestants of the Serbian national selection for the Eurovision Song Contest 2023, Pesma za Evroviziju '23, with the song "Samo mi se spava". On 1 March, Black performed during the first semi-final, where he placed sixth and thus qualified for the final. Subsequently, on 4 March, "Samo mi se spava" received the most points out of sixteen finalists by coming second on both the televote and the jury vote, making Luke Black the winner of the competition and Serbian representative for the contest in Liverpool. On 9 May, he performed third during the first semi-final of the Eurovision and qualified through to the final by placing 10th. Black dedicated the performance to the Belgrade school shooting victims. In the grand final, on May 13, he performed fifth and ultimately finished in 24th place out of twenty-six entries with 30 points. Serbian media portal Nova.rs credited Luke's low placement in the Eurovision to the comparison to the overwhelming success and acclaim of the previous Serbian entry - Konstrakta, the lack of support from the Serbian general public, technical issues in the semi-final on the behalf of BBC, as well as on the song itself.

Post-Eurovision, Black performed at two sold-out headline shows in London and released a single, the Lily Allen and Nirvana inspired "I'm So Happy", in August 2023. In October he was the opening act for Ukrainian band Go_A at the O2 Academy Islington.

On November 16, Black released another single, "God's Too Cool", a bass-heavy dance track produced by fellow London-based musician Benjamin Dunkerley. One month later, Black returned to Serbia for a sold-out concert at the Belgrade Youth Center, on the same stage where he first performed live 10 years prior. A number of his artist friends performed together with him for this occasion, including Konstrakta, the Serbian representative for the Eurovision Song Contest 2022.

=== 2024: Chainsaws in Paradise ===
On February 29, Black opened the second semi-final of Pesma za Evroviziju '24 with a reprise of his winning entry from the previous year, "Samo mi se spava". In the subsequent interview he announced the release of his first full length album, Chainsaws in Paradise, for May.

During the voting interval, Black performed an extended version of "God's Too Cool" and premiered the alternative metal song "Chainsaws in Paradise", the title track of his upcoming album. The single was released the following day.

Two additional singles preceded the album: "Winter Dahlia" on April 25 and "Drinking Jack With Daddy" on May 8. Chainsaws in Paradise was released on May 24 via streaming services, digital download, and as a limited CD run on Bandcamp. In June, Black embarked on a European tour covering the United Kingdom, Poland, Finland, and Austria, followed by a performance on the main stage of Exit Festival in July.

In September, he performed a selection of his songs as acoustic renditions, accompanied by a pianist, at an intimate concert in London titled "Chainsaws Unplugged". The show was also made available to watch online.

Black's first post-album single, "Batshit", was released on November 1. As a holiday special, an acoustic, sleigh-bell enhanced version of Winter Dahlia - subtitled Glacial Version - was offered exclusively on Bandcamp Friday on December 6 ahead of its wide streaming release the following week.

=== 2025–2026: Parasite ===
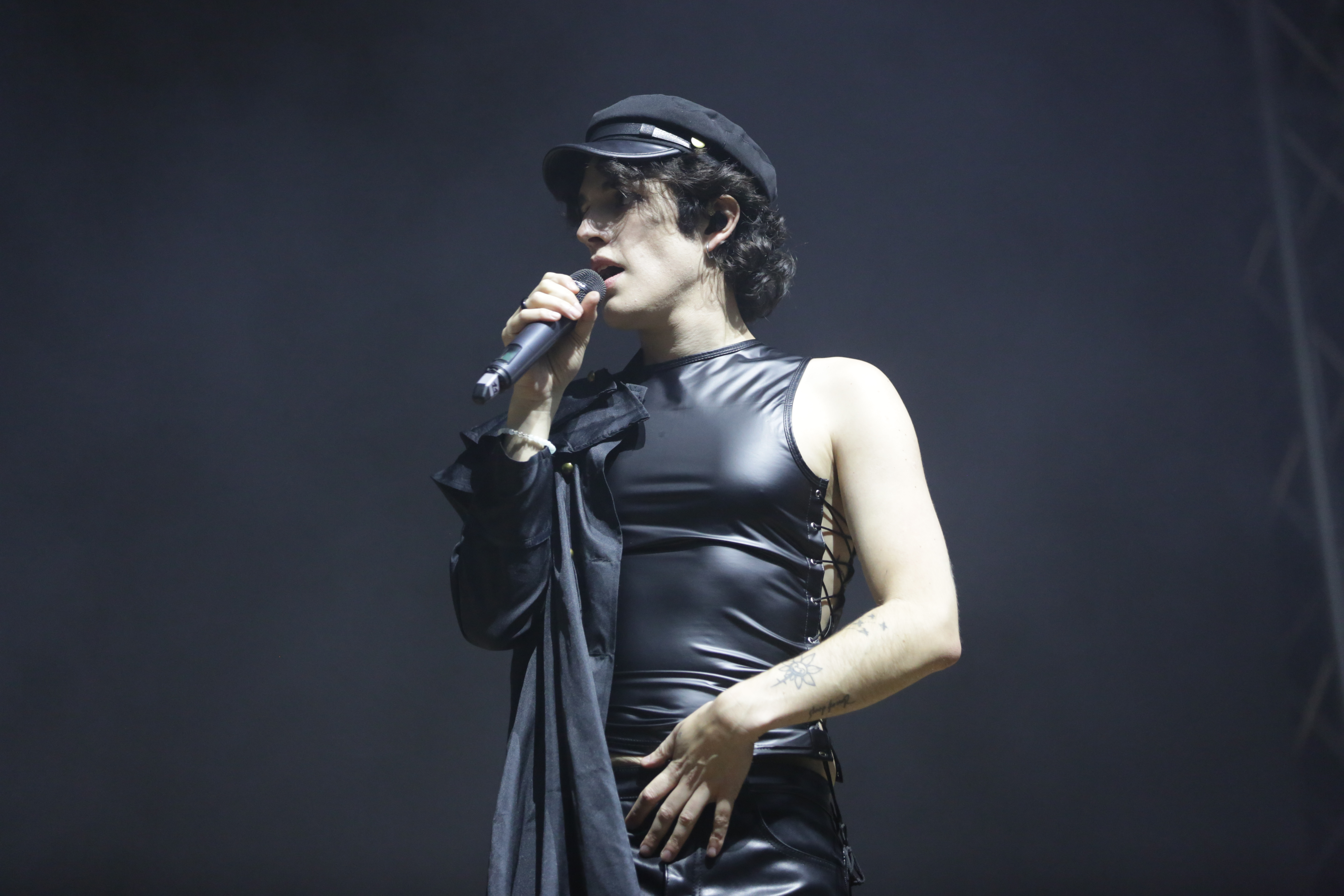
Luke Black performing "Parasite" at Eurofesta (2025)

Black's second collaboration with producer Jeonne, a club track called "Vomit", was released on Valentine's Day 2025. The accompanying music video was directed by Roger Spy and has Black starring in a double role as a priest and the victim of demonic possession, a homage to the classic horror movie The Exorcist.

On May 12, BBC World Service dedicated an episode of the "In the Studio" podcast to the writing and production of Black's upcoming album 'Parasite'.

In June, Black released "Roses in the Concrete", a guitar based folk song and collaboration with English musician Bo En. Black dedicated the track to the students protesting after the Novi Sad railway station canopy collapse, and the music video features scenes of the demonstrations. A week later, Greek techno musician Die Arkitekt released "Bosch Inferno", which was co-written by Black and features his vocals.

On July 12, Black performed at Exit Festival for the second time, this time as part of the GrassrEUts competition, an EU-funded project under the Creative Europe programme. He was named one of the winners of the following audience vote.

"Alchemy", a collaboration with Los Angeles-based artist Mood Killer, was released on November 14. In December, Black performed at Eurofesta in Milan where he premiered the title song of his next album. The single "Parasite" was released on January 30, supported by a "Parasite Ceremony" in London that included live performances and DJ set. The accompanying music video was choreographed and directed by Tatjana Gajanovic. "Kill Kill Kill" feat. Wolf Cutt was the final single ahead of Parasite’s release on March 27, 2026. In addition to streaming platforms, the album was made available as a double LP paired with Chainsaws in Paradise, featuring a cover that seamlessly merges both works.

On August 14, Black performed on the Buzz stage at Sziget Festival in Hungary, backed by his band Cameron Ford (drums) and Alexander Portat (guitar).

== Personal life and further education ==
Black resides in London, England. There, he studied at the Point Blank Music School and subsequently also graduated with a master's degree in music production from the British and Irish Modern Music Institute. Black worked as a graphic designer for a record label in London.

== Discography ==
=== Studio albums ===
- Chainsaws in Paradise (2024)
- PARASITE (2026)

=== Extended plays ===
- Thorns (2015)
- Neoslavic (2018)
- F23.8 (2021)
- Luke Black Remixes (2023)
- Singles 2015–2018 (2023)

=== Singles ===
Title	Year	Peak chart positions				Album
Title	Year	CRO Billb.	FIN	LTU	UK Down.	Album
"Nebula Lullaby"	2014	*	—	—	—	Singles 2015–2018
"D-Generation"	2015	*	—	—	—	Thorns and Singles 2015–2018
"Holding on to Love"	2015	*	—	—	—	Thorns and Singles 2015–2018
"Jingle Bell Rock" / "Nebula Lullaby"	2015	*	—	—	—	Non-album single
"Demons"	2016	*	—	—	—	Singles 2015–2018
"Walpurgis Night"	2017	*	—	—	—	Singles 2015–2018
"Olive Tree"	2017	*	—	—	—	Singles 2015–2018
"Frankensteined" (featuring Majed)	2019	*	—	—	—	Non-album single
"A House on the Hill"	2021	*	—	—	—	F23.8
"Amsterdam"	2021	*	—	—	—	F23.8
"Heartless"	2021	*	—	—	—	F23.8
"Samo mi se spava"	2023	25	50	22	83	Chainsaws in Paradise
"I'm So Happy"	2023	—	—	—	—	Chainsaws in Paradise
"God's Too Cool"	2023	—	—	—	—	Chainsaws in Paradise
"Chainsaws in Paradise"	2024	—	—	—	—	Chainsaws in Paradise
"Winter Dahlia"	2024	—	—	—	—	Chainsaws in Paradise
"Drinking Jack With Daddy"	2024	—	—	—	—	Chainsaws in Paradise
"BATSHIT"	2024	—	—	—	—	PARASITE
"Winter Dahlia (Glacial Version)"	2024	—	—	—	—	Non-album single
"VOMIT"	2025	—	—	—	—	PARASITE
"Roses In The Concrete"	2025	—	—	—	—	Non-album singles
"BOSCH INFERNO" (Die Arkitekt featuring Luke Black)	2025	—	—	—	—	Non-album singles
"ALCHEMY" (with Mood Killer)	2025	—	—	—	—	PARASITE
"PARASITE"	2026	—	—	—	—	PARASITE
"KILL KILL KILL" (with Wolf Cutt)	2026	—	—	—	—	PARASITE
"—" denotes a single that did not chart or was not released in that territory. "*" detones that a chart didn't exist at the time of release

== Music videos ==
Title	Year	Director
"D-Generation"	2015	Vasso Vu
"Holding on to Love"	2015	Filip Mojzeš, Tatjana Krstevski
"Walpurgis Night"	2017	Sara Vulović, Luke Black
"Olive Tree"	2017	Kosta Đuraković
"A House on the Hill"	2021	Vasso Vu, Razorade
"Amsterdam"	2021	Luke Black
"I'm So Happy"	2023	Prosper Unger-Hamilton
"VOMIT"	2025	Roger Spy
"PARASITE"	2026	Tatjana Gajanovic

Preceded by Konstrakta with "In corpore sano"	Serbia in the Eurovision Song Contest; 2023	Succeeded by Teya Dora with "Ramonda"
