= Best of 11-Twelve =

Best Of 11-Twelve

Studio album by Bosson
- Released: 10 June 2013
- Recorded: 2012–2013
- Genre: Dance-pop
- Label: Spinnup

Bosson chronology
Future's Gone Tomorrow / Life Is Here Today (2007)	Best Of 11-Twelve (2013)

Best of 11-Twelve is the fifth studio album by Swedish singer Bosson. It was released in 2013 by Spinnup.

== Track listing ==
No.	Title	Length
1.	"Guardian Angel"	3:39
2.	"Every Single Time"	3:57
3.	"Baby I Believe In You"	3:44
4.	"Loveshock"	3:20
5.	"I Am Sorry"	3:37
6.	"Tonight We Unite"	3:43
7.	"Just Can’t Get Over You"	3:37
8.	"Falling For You"	3:23
9.	"Desire"	3:16
10.	"Dear Nathalie"	3:51
11.	"Champions"	3:23
12.	"Melanie"	3:29
13.	"The Saviour"	4:10
Total length:		47:08

Bonus tracks
No.	Title	Length
14.	"10.000 Feet (featuring Nobium and Wreck n play Apollo-4)"	3:08
15.	"Love Is In The Air (featuring Baby Bash and Apollo-4)"	3:37
Total length:		53:54
