= The Right Time =

Right Time or The Right Time may refer to:

== Songs ==
- "Night Time Is the Right Time" (or "The Right Time"), rhythm and blues standard first recorded in 1957
- "The Right Time" (Hoodoo Gurus song), 1993 single by Australian rock group Hoodoo Gurus
- "Right Time" (Mango Groove song), 1995 song by South African band Mango Groove
- "The Right Time" (The Corrs song), 1996 song by Irish band The Corrs
- "The Right Time" (Ultra song), 1998 song by British pop group Ultra
- "Right Time", 2020 song by Australian musician Hayden James and Swedish pop duo Icona Pop
- "Right Time", 2014 song by Nikki Lane from her album All or Nothin'

== Albums ==
- Right Time, 1976 album by Jamaican reggae band Mighty Diamonds
- The Right Time (Etta James album), 1992 album by American R&B singer Etta James
- The Right Time (Bosson album), 1998 album by Swedish group Bosson

== Other ==
- Tom Jones: The Right Time, 1992 television series hosted by Welsh singer Tom Jones

== See also ==
- "This Is the Right Time", 1989 song by British singer Lisa Stansfield
