= Bosson =

Musical artist

- Born: Staffan Olsson; 21 February 1969 (age 57); Kiruna, Sweden
- Genres: Pop, dance-pop
- Occupations: Singer, songwriter
- Years active: 1994–present
- Labels: MNW, BAM, Spinnup

Bosson on the album artwork for One in a Million

Staffan Olsson (born 21 February 1969), better known by his stage name Bosson, is a Swedish singer and songwriter.

== Early life ==
His stage name comes from the fact that his father's first name is Bo – hence he is Bo's son.

== Career ==
Bosson first gained nationwide fame in Sweden when he imitated Michael Jackson in the first season of Sikta mot stjärnorna, performing "Black or White" and winning his semi-final. His big break as a solo artist came when composing and performing the song "One in a Million", from the album One in a Million, which became a Top 10 hit in Europe and Asia in 2000 and 2001, which also appeared in the film Miss Congeniality. He wrote it for his then-girlfriend Jessica Olérs, Miss Sweden 1998, and was nominated for a Golden Globe.

Two years later, the successful follow-up Rockstar was released. The year after, he competed in Melodifestivalen with a song he released that year, Efharisto. But in the second opportunity round (andra chansen) he finished 6th, only beating Fredrik Kempe and Anne-Lie Rydé. In June 2007, he released his fourth album Future's Gone Tomorrow / Life Is Here Today and in June 2013, he released his fifth album Best of 11-Twelve. He served as an opening act for Britney Spears during her tour in 2000, and has toured with Kylie Minogue. He has also written songs for Amy Grant and the famous guitarist Al Di Meola. As well as in his native Sweden, Bosson has achieved huge success and toured extensively in countries like Russia, Ukraine, Belarus and Kazakhstan. He also performed with Dima Bilan.

== Discography ==
=== Studio albums ===
Title	Album details	Peak chart positions					
Title	Album details	SWE	AUT	FIN	GER	NOR	SWI
The Right Time	Released: 1998; Label: MNW, BAM; Formats: K7, CD	29	—	—	—	—	—
One in a Million	Released: 28 May 2001; Label: MNW, BAM; Formats: K7, CD	21	72	38	50	30	43
Rockstar	Released: 5 November 2003; Label: MNW, BAM; Formats: K7, CD	49	—	—	—	—	—
Future's Gone Tomorrow / Life Is Here Today	Released: 11 June 2007; Label: SEO Music, Bonnier Amigo; Formats: CD	21	—	—	—	—	—
Best of 11-Twelve	Released: 10 June 2013; Label: Spinnup; Formats: CD	—	—	—	—	—	—
"—" denotes items that did not chart or were not released.

=== Compilation albums ===
Title	Album details
The Best	Released: 2005; Label: Prof Music, Veter Entertainment; Formats: CD
One in a million – The Hit Collection	Released: 2009; Label: ASP Records; Formats: CD/DVD
The Best Collection	Released: 10 June 2010; Label: Universal Music Group International; Formats: CD/DVD

=== Singles ===
Year	Title	Peak chart positions								Certifications	Album
Year	Title	SWE	AUT	BEL FLD	BEL WL	DEN	GER	NOR	SWI	Certifications	Album
1997	"Baby Don't Cry"	—	—	—	—	—	—	—	—		The Right Time
1999	"We Live"	—	—	17	—	—	—	—	—		The Right Time
2001	"One in a Million"	21	5	3	37	16	12	2	8	SWE: Gold	One in a Million
2001	"I Believe"	16	—	17	18	—	69	—	34		One in a Million
2001	"Over the Mountains"	32	—	—	—	—	—	—	—		One in a Million
2002	"Weightless" (duet with Emma Andersson)	9	—	—	—	—	—	—	—		Who I Am
2002	"This Is Our Life"	40	—	—	—	—	—	—	—		One in a Million
2003	"You Opened My Eyes"	32	—	—	—	—	98	—	—		Rockstar
2003	"A Little More Time"	25	—	—	—	—	47	—	—		Rockstar
2003	"Beautiful"	—	—	—	—	—	—	—	—		Rockstar
2004	"Efharisto"	24	—	—	—	—	—	—	—		Rockstar
2004	"Falling in Love"	47	—	—	—	—	—	—	—		Rockstar
2004	"I Need Love"	22	—	—	—	—	—	—	—		Rockstar
2006	"You"	—	—	—	—	—	—	—	—		Future's Gone Tomorrow / Life Is Here Today
2007	"What If I"	39	—	—	—	—	—	—	—		Future's Gone Tomorrow / Life Is Here Today
2007	"I Can Feel Love"	—	—	—	—	—	—	—	—		Future's Gone Tomorrow / Life Is Here Today
2007	"Believe in Love"	—	—	—	—	—	—	—	—		Future's Gone Tomorrow / Life Is Here Today
2011	"Guardian Angel"	—	—	—	—	—	—	—	—		Best of 11-Twelve
2012	"Love Is in the Air" (featuring Baby Bash and Apollo-4)	—	—	—	—	—	—	—	—		Best of 11-Twelve
2012	"10.000 Feet" (featuring Nobium and Wreck n play Apollo-4)	—	—	—	—	—	—	—	—		Best of 11-Twelve
"—" denotes items that did not chart or were not released.

=== Collaborations ===
- 2002: Emma Andersson featuring Bosson – Weightless
- 2009: Elizma Theron featuring Bosson – One in a Million
- 2016: Sunbeat featuring Bosson – Eagle in the Sky
- 2017: Edgar featuring Bosson – My Love

== Filmography ==
Television and web
Year	Title	Role	Notes
2017	Full House (Armenian TV series)	himself	Special guest
