= Rockstar (Bosson album) =

Studio album by Bosson
- Released: 5 November 2003
- Recorded: 2002–2003
- Genre: Pop, dance-pop
- Label: MNW

Bosson chronology
One in a Million (2002)	Rockstar (2003)	Future's Gone Tomorrow / Life Is Here Today (2007)

Rockstar is the third album by Swedish pop singer Bosson. It was released in 2003 by MNW.

== Track listing ==
No.	Title	Length
1.	"I Need Love"	3:33
2.	"You Opened My Eyes"	3:40
3.	"One of a Kind"	3:52
4.	"A Little More Time"	3:53
5.	"Beautiful"	4:21
6.	"Falling in Love"	3:41
7.	"Definite Goodbye"	4:05
8.	"Song for Noa"	3:32
9.	"Say You Will"	4:07
10.	"Xanadu"	3:47
11.	"Run Away with You"	3:52
12.	"Love Is Still Alive"	3:58
13.	"Rockstar"	3:44
14.	"It's Not Over Yet"	3:49
15.	"Efharisto"	3:06
Total length:		57:00
