= Over the Mountains =

Single by Bosson

from the album One in a Million
- Released: 9 December 2001
- Genre: Pop
- Length: 4:21
- Label: MNW
- Songwriter: Bosson
- Producers: Bosson; Tobias Lindell

Bosson singles chronology
"I Believe" (2001)	"Over the Mountains" (2001)	"Weightless" (2002)

Music video
- "Over the Mountains" on YouTube

"Over the Mountains" is a song by the Swedish pop singer Bosson. It was released in 2001 on MNW Music as the third single from his second studio album, One in a Million (2001). It is a pop song that was written by Bosson and produced by Bosson along with Tobias Lindell.

== Track listing ==
No.	Title	Length
1.	"Over the Mountains" (radio version)	3:56
2.	"Over the Mountains" (Planet Playground's 130 Alternative Radio Version)	4:07
3.	"Over the Mountains"	4:21

== Charts ==
Chart (2001)	Peak position
Sweden (Sverigetopplistan)	32
