= Future's Gone Tomorrow / Life Is Here Today =

Studio album by Bosson
- Released: 11 June 2007
- Recorded: 2005–2007
- Genres: Pop, dance-pop
- Labels: SEO Music, Bonnier Amigo

Bosson chronology
Rockstar (2003)	Future's Gone Tomorrow / Life Is Here Today (2007)	Best of 11-Twelve (2013)

Future's Gone Tomorrow / Life Is Here Today is the fourth album by Swedish pop singer Bosson. It was released in 2007 by SEO Music and Bonnier Amigo. It peaked in Sweden at #21 on the Swedish Album Charts.

== Background ==
The album is typically Bosson-styled, with his characteristic high pitched vocals.

== Singles ==
Out of the four singles released, only "What If I" managed to enter the Swedish Charts, peaking at #39. The album also features "Live Forever", a Magnus Carlsson cover which competed within Melodifestivalen 2007.

== Track listing ==
No.	Title	Length
1.	"Simple Man Wishing"	3:39
2.	"Believe in Love"	3:25
3.	"You"	3:55
4.	"What If I"	4:10
5.	"I Can Feel Love"	3:07
6.	"Walking"	4:10
7.	"Rain in December"	4:17
8.	"Love This Life"	4:31
9.	"Thinking About You"	4:21
10.	"Sin-Cinderella"	4:38
11.	"Summer with You"	3:51
12.	"What a Day"	3:34
13.	"Live Forever"	3:09
14.	"You (Soft Version)"	3:54
Total length:		54:41
