= Borovo (company) =

Croatian footwear company

- Company type: Public company
- Industry: Footwear
- Founded: June 7, 1931
- Headquarters: Vukovar, Croatia
- Products: shoes; sneakers
- Website: https://www.borovo.hr/

Borovo is a Croatian shoe manufacturer. It was founded in 1931 in the village of Borovo near Vukovar. It had its greatest success during the time of SFR Yugoslavia thanks to its own production of shoes as well as its most famous product, Borosana shoes.

== History ==
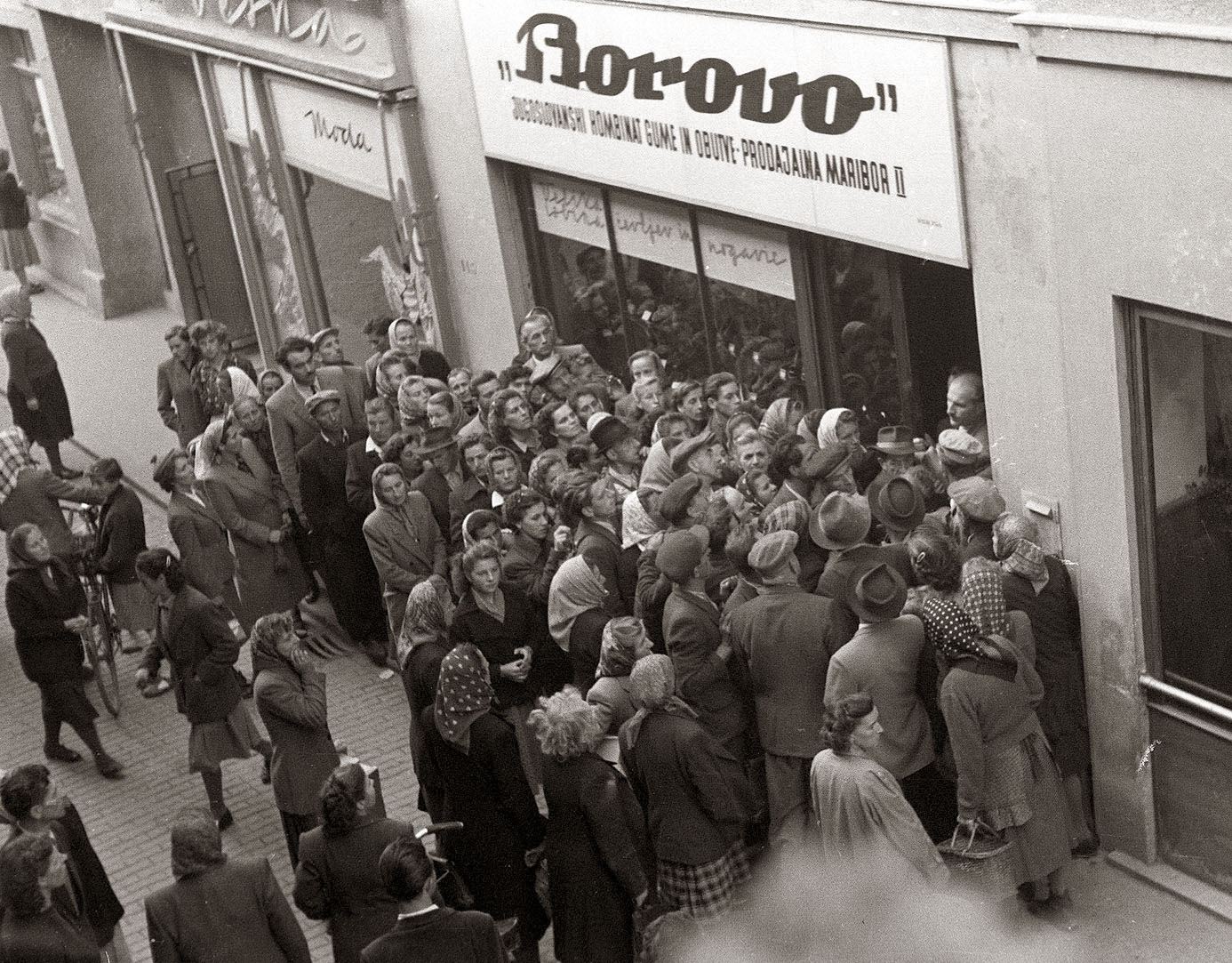
A crowd in front of a Borovo store in Maribor, Slovenia in 1955

=== Early years ===
Borovo was founded on June 7, 1931, by the Czech industrialist Tomáš Baťa and started the production of footwear on the outskirts of Vukovar. Already in the first years of its existence, the Bata factory switched to a combined organization. In 1933, the production of technical rubber goods began, and Bata became one of the first companies in Croatia in the field of rubber industry.

=== Later years ===
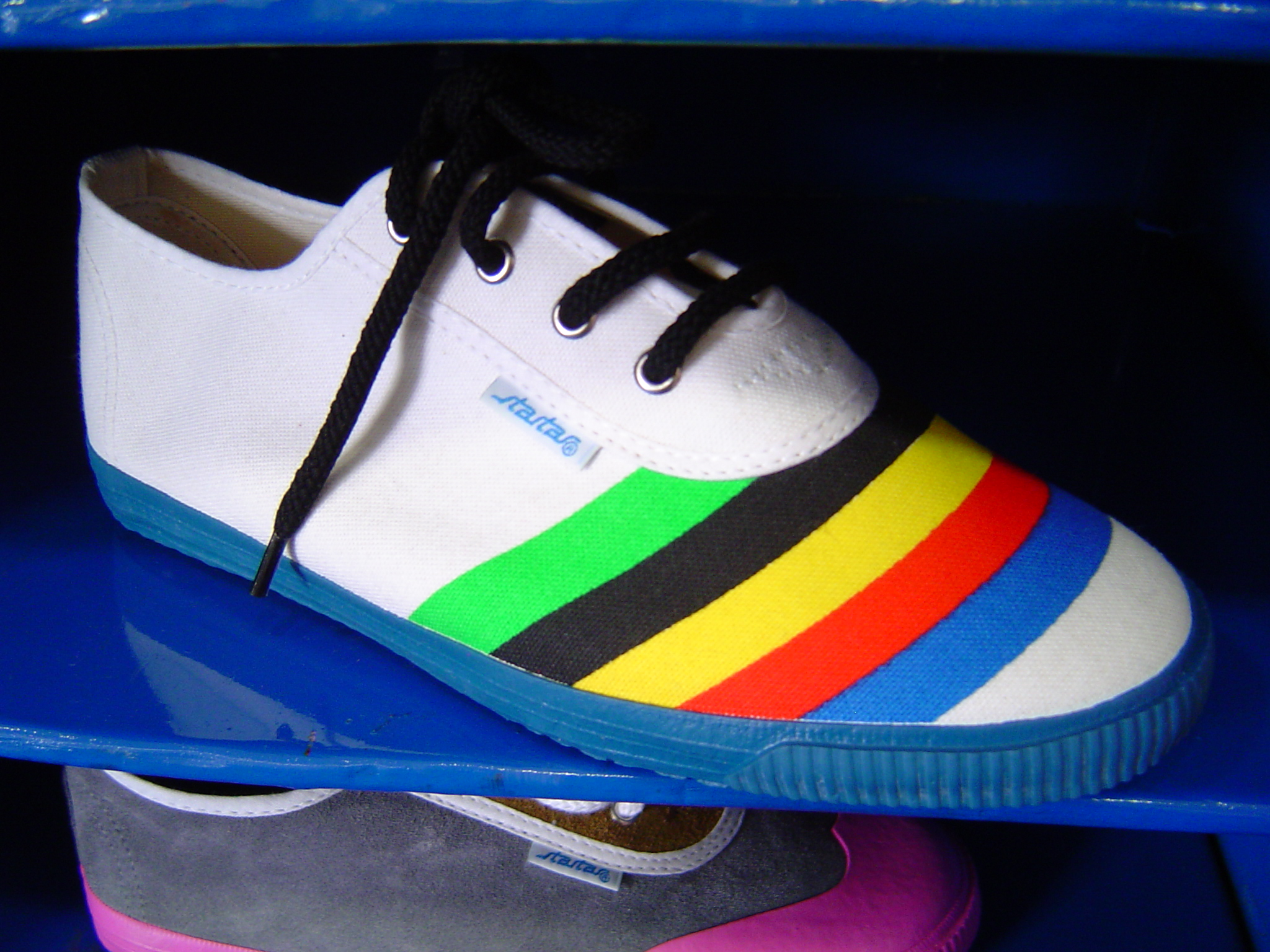
Original Startas sneakers

After the end of World War II in 1945, the factory was nationalized and the Borovo Rubber and Footwear Factory was established. Under this name and through various organizational forms, Borovo continued to work until 1991.

In the period from 1947 to the end of the 1980s, Borovo grew into the largest and most economically powerful company in the production and sale of footwear and rubber in this part of Europe.

In 1968, Borosana shoes for special purposes were produced. It was developed by a team of experts led by orthopedist Dr. Branko Strinović, and even today it is the trademark of Borovo.

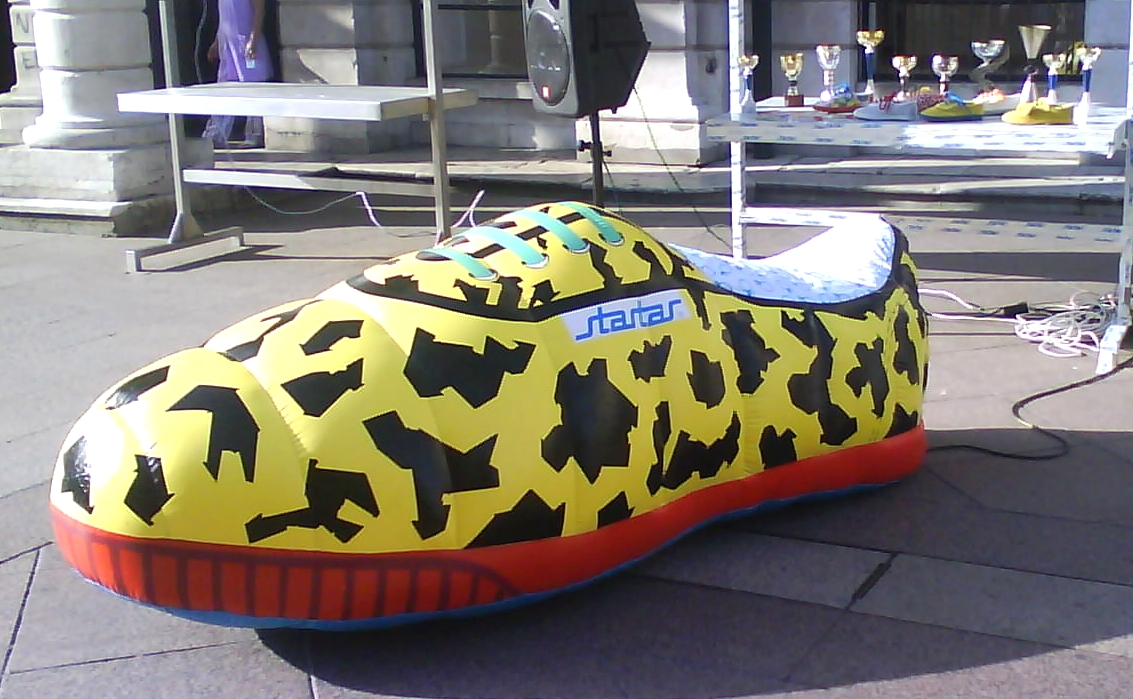
Startas sneakers replica in Rijeka

Then, in 1976, a sneaker called Startas was released on the market, which was originally intended for playing table tennis, but has grown into the company's biggest brand to this day. They peaked in popularity after being the official footwear for the 1987 Summer Universiade.

Due to the war in 1991, Borovo stopped operating, and many of its buildings were destroyed. The management of Borovo worked in Zagreb from 1992 to 1997, and production took place in Donji Miholjac. When Borovo took possession of its property in Vukovar in 1998, it organized itself as a business group and started producing footwear and technical rubber at its home location.

=== Modern-day Borovo ===
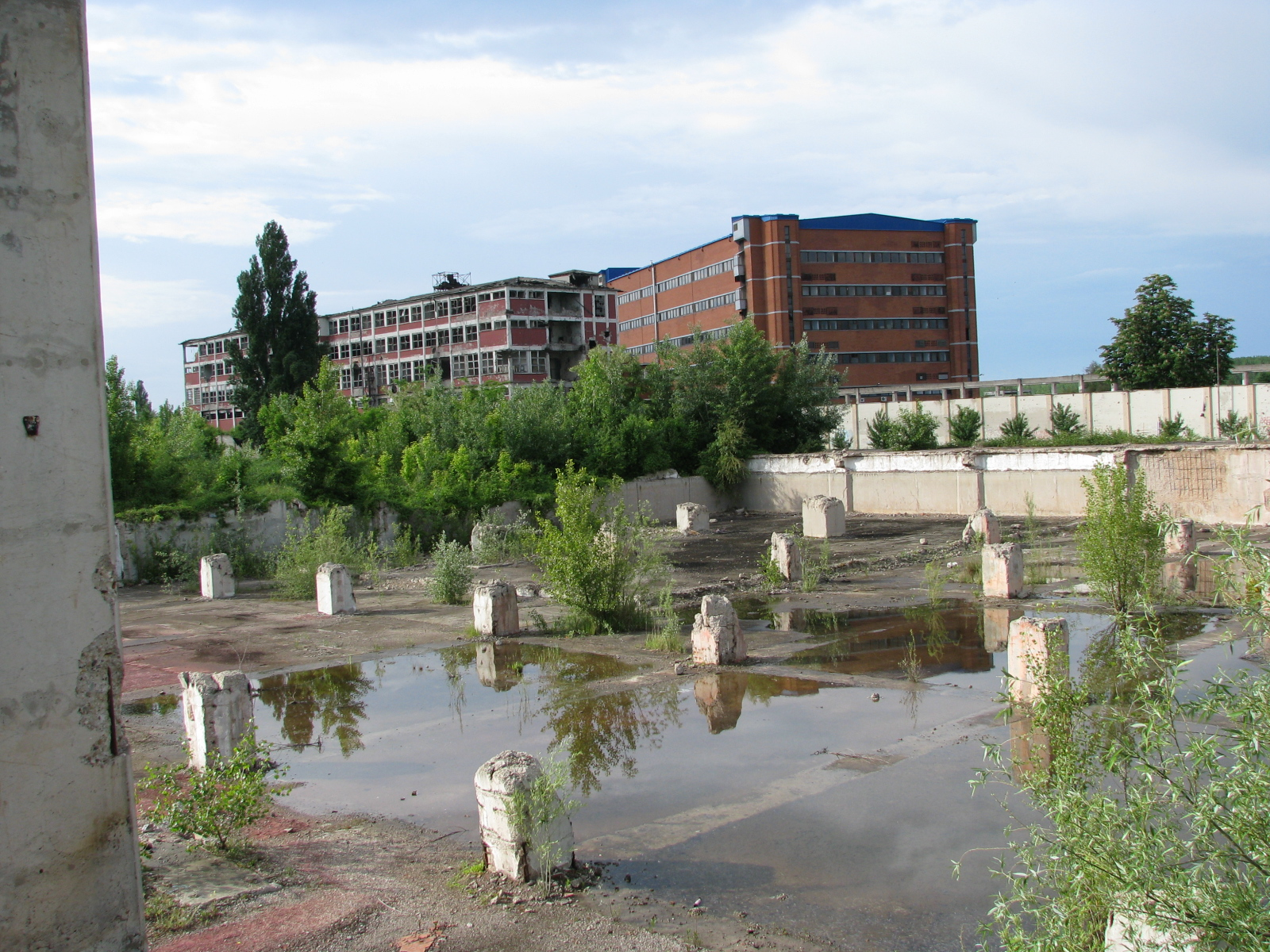
Old factory building (2010) damaged during the 1991 Battle of Vukovar.

Today's business areas of Borovo are:

- production of leather and rubber footwear
- wholesale
- retail
- trade abroad

In 2008, the production of leather footwear was moved to the newly renovated and technologically equipped building of Obućara nova. In the same year, Borovo released Boromina, modernized version of Borosana shoes.

Serbia's representative for the 2022 Eurovision Song Contest, Konstrakta, wore white Borosana shoes at her performance in Turin. After the final, the popularity of the Borosana shoes grew, and the press reported on how the footwear was procured through the efforts of Dejan Aćimović and Zrinko Ogresta.
