= Samo mi se spava =

2023 single by Luke Black

Single by Luke Black

from the album Chainsaws in Paradise
- Language: Serbian; English
- English title: "I just want to sleep"
- Released: 2 February 2023
- Genre: Hyperpop
- Length: 2:54
- Label: PGP-RTS
- Composer: Luke Black
- Lyricist: Luke Black
- Producers: Majed Kfoury; COMANAVAGO; Luke Black; Milovan Bošković

Luke Black singles chronology
"238" (2022)	"Samo mi se spava" (2023)

Eurovision Song Contest 2023 entry
- Country: Serbia
- Artist: Luke Black
- Composer: Luke Black
- Lyricist: Luke Black

Finals performance
- Semi-final result: 10th
- Semi-final points: 37
- Final result: 24th
- Final points: 30

Entry chronology
- ◄ "In corpore sano" (2022)
- "Ramonda" (2024) ►

Official performance video
- "Samo mi se spava" (First Semi-Final) on YouTube "Samo mi se spava" (Grand Final) on YouTube

"Samo mi se spava" (Serbian Cyrillic: Само ми се спава, IPA: [sâmo mi se spǎːva]; transl. "I just want to sleep") is a song by Serbian singer-songwriter Luke Black, released on 2 February 2023. The song represented Serbia in the Eurovision Song Contest 2023 after winning Pesma za Evroviziju '23, Serbia's national selection for that year's Eurovision Song Contest. It finished in 24th place with 30 points, after qualifying from the first semi-final with 37 points, which placed him 10th.

== Background and composition ==
In interviews, Black had reported that he had made the song in April 2020 with the help of a Lebanese friend, Majed Kfoury. In the Autumn of 2022, he took the song to the producer Benjamin Dunkerley, who added new production and sound design, recorded Serbian vocals, and ultimately prepared the master recording. After seeing Serbian artist Konstrakta win Pesma za Evroviziju '22 with "In corpore sano", he thought that he could send "Samo mi se spava" to the contest.

According to Black, the song describes himself being isolated from the world. During the COVID-19 pandemic, he would become "very alienated from the world", only playing video games and watching anime in his bed during quarantine. He also stated that "the song talks about people needing to wake up, because evil multiplies when people keep their eyes closed to it. Only by waking up can it be defeated."

== Eurovision Song Contest ==
=== Pesma za Evroviziju '23 ===
Pesma za Evroviziju '23 was the national final organised by RTS to select the Serbian entry for the Eurovision Song Contest 2023. The selection consisted of two semi-finals, each consisting of 16 songs each, held on 1 and 2 March 2023, respectively, and a final on 4 March 2023 that consisted of 16 songs.

"Samo mi se spava" was selected to perform in the first semi-final in the eighth position. Heading into the contest, the song was considered among the favorites to win, topping polls on Eurovision fan-sites. After qualifying from the first semi-final in sixth place, the song was drawn to perform 10th in the final. In the final, the song was revealed to have scored a total of 20 points, with 10 points each coming from a public televote and a jury vote. At the end of the voting, it was revealed that the song had earned the most points, and had thus won the competition, therefore earning the Serbian spot for the Eurovision Song Contest 2023.

=== At Eurovision ===
According to Eurovision rules, all nations with the exceptions of the host country and the "Big Five" (France, Germany, Italy, Spain and the United Kingdom) are required to qualify from one of two semi-finals in order to compete for the final; the top ten countries from each semi-final progress to the final. The European Broadcasting Union (EBU) split up the competing countries into six different pots based on voting patterns from previous contests, with countries with favourable voting histories put into the same pot. On 31 January 2023, an allocation draw was held, which placed each country into one of the two semi-finals, and determined which half of the show they would perform in. Serbia was placed into the first semi-final, to be held on 9 May 2023, and performed in the first half of the show. The song qualified in 10th in the semi-final, and finished 24th in the grand final with 30 points.

== Charts ==
Chart performance for "Samo mi se spava"
Chart (2023)	Peak position
Croatia (Billboard)	25
Finland (Suomen virallinen lista)	50
Lithuania (AGATA)	22
UK Singles Downloads (Official Charts)	83
