= One in a Million (Bosson song) =

2000 single by Bosson

Single by Bosson

from the album One in a Million
- B-side: "We Will Meet Again"; "Where Are You"
- Released: December 2000
- Genre: Pop
- Length: 3:35 (original version); 3:30 (remix)
- Label: MNW; Capitol; EMI
- Songwriter: Bosson
- Producers: Joakim Udd, Peter Boström

Bosson singles chronology
"We Live" (1999)	"One in a Million" (2000)	"I Believe" (2001)

Music video
- "One in a Million" on YouTube

"One in a Million" is a song by Swedish singer Bosson, released in late 2000, first appearing on the soundtrack for the 2000 film Miss Congeniality. It was also the lead single from his 2001 second album of the same name.

The song was nominated for a Golden Globe Award for "Best Original Song – Motion Picture". It became a top 10 hit in several countries in Europe and Asia in 2001.

== Track listings ==
Europe CD-single
No.	Title	Length
1.	"One in a Million"	3:35
2.	"One in a Million (remix)"	3:30

Europe maxi-single
No.	Title	Length
1.	"One in a Million"	3:35
2.	"One in a Million (remix)"	3:30
3.	"We Will Meet Again"	4:35

Sweden maxi-single
No.	Title	Length
1.	"One in a Million (album version)"	3:35
2.	"One in a Million (The Luva remix)"	3:48
3.	"One in a Million (One Million Motions version)"	6:46
4.	"One in a Million (The Mystica mix)"	4:00

Sweden CD-single
No.	Title	Length
1.	"One in a Million"	3:35
2.	"Where Are You? (album version)"	3:48
3.	"One in a Million (The Mystica mix)"	6:46

== Charts ==
=== Weekly charts ===
Chart (2001)	Peak position
Austria (Ö3 Austria Top 40)	5
Belgium (Ultratip Bubbling Under Flanders)	3
Belgium (Ultratop 50 Wallonia)	37
Denmark (Tracklisten)	16
Germany (GfK)	12
Norway (VG-lista)	2
Poland (Polish Airplay Charts)	23
Portugal (AFP)	7
Romania (Romanian Top 100)	4
Sweden (Sverigetopplistan)	7
Switzerland (Schweizer Hitparade)	8

Chart (2023)	Peak position
Hungary (Single Top 40)	38

Chart (2025)	Peak Position
Moldova Airplay (TopHit)	77

=== Year-end charts ===
Chart (2001)	Position
Germany (Media Control)	54
Sweden (Hitlistan)	49
Switzerland (Schweizer Hitparade)	50

Chart (2024)	Position
Kazakhstan Airplay (TopHit)	183

== Certifications and sales ==
Region	Certification	Certified units/sales
Sweden (GLF)	Gold	15,000^{^}
^{^} Shipments figures based on certification alone.
