= Filip Baloš =

Serbian singer-songwriter (born 2001)

Filip Baloš Филип Балош
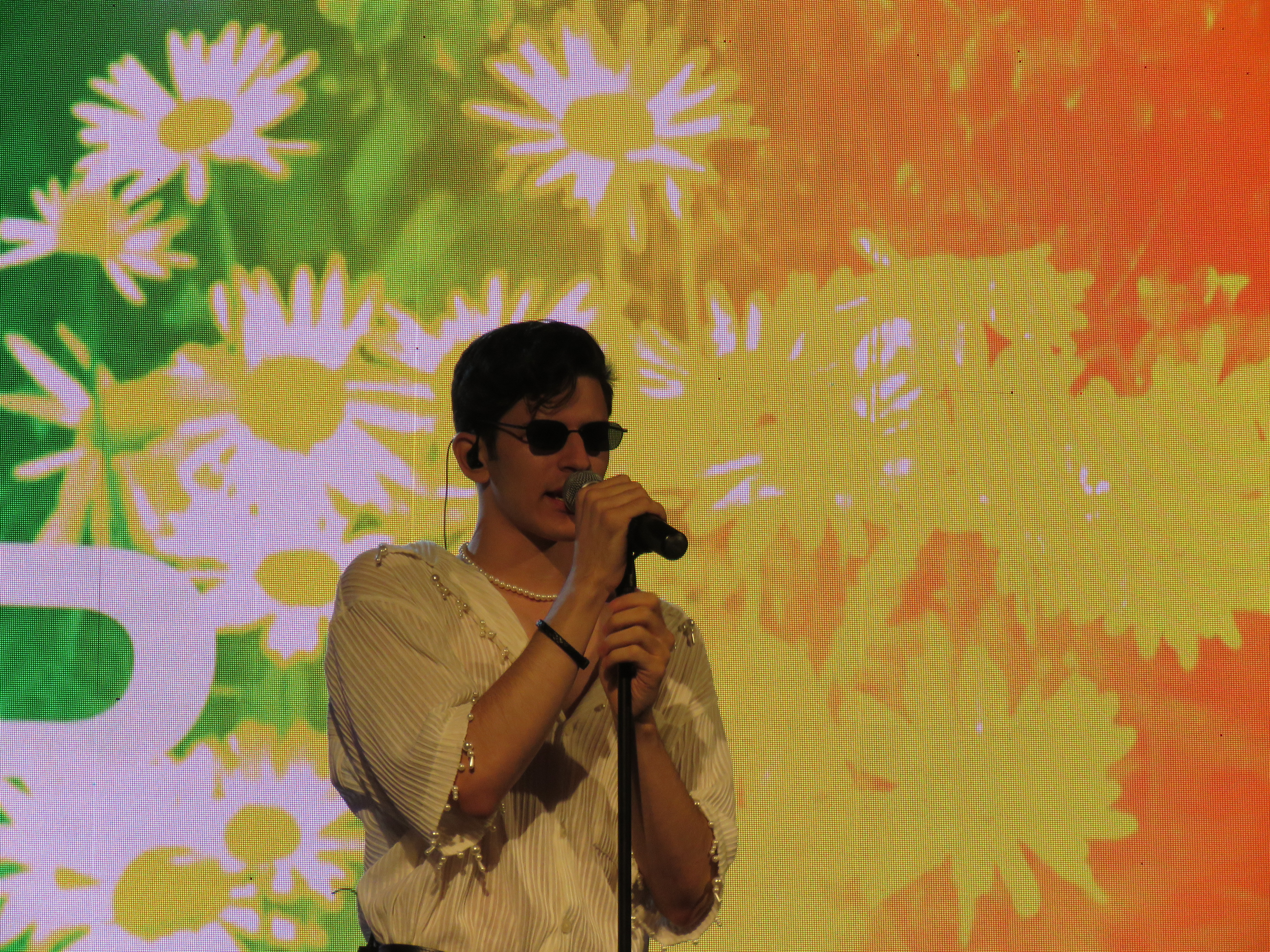
- Baloš in 2023

Background information
- Born: 18 March 2001 (age 25); Novi Sad, Serbia, FR Yugoslavia
- Genres: Electropop
- Occupations: Singer; songwriter
- Years active: 2017—present

Filip Baloš (Serbian Cyrillic: Филип Балош; born 18 March 2001) is a Serbian singer-songwriter.

== Early life and education ==
Baloš comes from a musical and dramatic family. At the age of four, he began to show his love for painting and music. As a boy, he participated in various music festivals. In 2016, he entered the Bogdan Šuput High School for Design. He was part of various group exhibitions and painting colonies. In 2020, after finishing high school, Filip enrolled in the first year of the Academy of Arts in Novi Sad, department of painting. Since October 2022, he is a student of the Academy of Arts in Novi Sad.

== Career ==
In 2019, Baloš won the Play Star title awarded by Play Radio. The task was for all participants to record themselves singing a song of their choice. Baloš recorded himself singing "Breathin" (2018) by Ariana Grande. The commission of that radio, made up of music regulars, rated his work as the best. As the winner, he recorded the song "Pomereno" ("Moved"). In 2022, with Zemlja gruva! he recorded a cover of Konstrakta's song "Mekano" ("Soft"), after they heard him singing on social networks, and invited him to record his version of the song in their studio. It was also praised by Kim Petras.

On 9 January 2023, it was revealed that Baloš would be competing at Pesma za Evroviziju '23 with the song "Novi plan, drugi san" ("New Plan, Different Dream"), and on 27 January he would be performing in the first semi-final. Baloš wrote the lyrics, music and arrangement. He found the inspiration for the song, which he submitted for the competition, in his brother, who suffered because of the breakup, but very quickly rose from the situation and continued to make new plans and set other goals. As he stated, the song is motivational and can refer to other situations in life. He performed at the competition with Kost Musu, who performed Konstrakta's performance in 2022. Baloš qualified for the final as fourth in the first semi-final. In the finals, he finished third in the jury vote (8 points), fourth in the audience vote (7 points) and finished fourth overall (15 points).

On 21 December 2023, Baloš was announced among the participants of Pesma za Evroviziju '24, the Serbian national final for the Eurovision Song Contest 2024, with the song "Duga je noć" ("The Night Is Long"). The song failed to qualify for the final.

== Influences ==
Baloš cites Lady Gaga, Charlie Puth and Finneas as his musical role models, as well as local authors and performers, Bojana Vunturišević and Sara Jo.

== Discography ==
=== Singles ===
Title	Year	Peak chart positions	Album
Title	Year	SRB	Album
"Pomereno"	2019	—	Non-album singles
"Nema kraja"	2020	—	Non-album singles
"Idemo do mene"	2020	—	Non-album singles
"Mekano"	2022	—	Non-album singles
"Novi plan drugi san"	2023	35	Non-album singles
"Sami"	2023	—	Non-album singles
"Duga je noć"	2024	51	Non-album singles
"Dovoljno"	2024	—	Non-album singles
"—" denotes a single that did not chart or was not released in that territory. " * " denotes chart did not exist at that time.
