= Pesma za Evroviziju '23 =

2023 Serbia contest to enter Eurovision

Pesma za Evroviziju 2023

Dates and venue
- Semi-final 1: 1 March 2023
- Semi-final 2: 2 March 2023
- Final: 4 March 2023
- Venue: RTS Studio 8 Košutnjak, Belgrade, Serbia

Organisation
- Broadcaster: Radio Television of Serbia (RTS)
- Presenters: Dragana Kosjerina; Milan Marić; Kristina Radenković; Stefan Popović

Participants
- Number of entries: 32
- Number of finalists: 16

Vote
- Voting system: The jury and the televoting award one set of 12, 10 & 8–1 points each.
- Winning song: "Samo mi se spava" (Само ми се спава) by Luke Black

Pesma za Evroviziju '23 (Serbian Cyrillic: Песма за Евровизију '23, PzE '23) was the second edition of Pesma za Evroviziju, Serbia's national final organised by Radio Television of Serbia (RTS) to select the Serbian entry for the Eurovision Song Contest 2023. The selection consisted of two semi-finals held on 1 and 2 March 2023, respectively, and a final on 4 March 2023. All shows were hosted by Milan Marić and Dragana Kosjerina with backstage interviews conducted by Kristina Radenković and Stefan Popović. The three shows were broadcast on RTS1, RTS Svet and RTS Planeta as well as streamed online via the broadcaster's website rts.rs and the broadcaster's Eurovision dedicated Youtube channel.

== Format and production ==
In 2023, RTS decided to once again organize Pesma za Evroviziju to decide its representative at the Eurovision Song Contest 2023. On the same day as the submission window had opened, the rulebook was published. The selection consisted of two semi-finals, held on 1 and 2 March, and a final on 4 March 2023.

=== Voting ===
In all 3 shows, the jury and the televoting award one set of 12, 10 & 8–1 points each to their 10 favourite entries. Eight entries that scored the most points in each semi-final progressed to the final. The act with the most points in the final is declared the winner.

=== Production ===
Pesma za Evroviziju '23 was produced by RTS and SkyMusic. PzE '23 had a budget of around €150,000, whilst around €250,000 were spent.

=== Hosts ===
All shows were hosted by Milan Marić and Dragana Kosjerina with greenroom interviews conducted by Kristina Radenković and Stefan Popović.

== Competing entries ==
The submission window for competing entries opened on the 1st of September 2022, and was due to close on the 15th of November the same year, but was later pushed back to the 1st of December. Artists were required to be Serbian citizens and submit entries in one of the official languages of the Republic of Serbia, while songwriters of any nationality were allowed to submit songs. At the closing of the deadline, around 185 submissions were received.

A selection committee consisting of RTS music editors reviewed the submissions and selected 32 entries to proceed to the national final. The selected competing entries were announced on 9 January 2023 and among the competing artists are Tijana Dapčević, who represented Macedonia in the Eurovision Song Contest 2014, and Hurricane (albeit with a different line-up), which represented Serbia in the Eurovision Song Contest 2020 and 2021.

Artist	Song	Songwriter(s)
Adem Mehmedović	"Osmeh" (Осмех)	Adem Mehmedović
Andjela	"Loše procene" (Лоше процене)	Ivan Milanov, Nemanja Antonić, Asal Sinanović, Filip Nestorović, Ana Sekulić
Angellina	"Lanac" (Ланац)	Ivan Franović, Anđela Vujović
Boris Subotić	"Nedostupan" (Недоступан)	Milenko Škarić, Nemanja Antonić, Filip Nestorović
Chegi & Braća Bluz Band	"Svadba ili kavga" (Свадба или кавга)	Željko Čeganjac, Dušan Čeganjac, Stefan Čeganjac, Boris Kapetanović
Doris Milošević	"Tišina" (Тишина)	Ognjan Milošević
Duo Grand	"Viva la Vida"	Nino Ademović, Goran Ratković Rale, Branislav Glušac
Džipsii	"Greh" (Грех)	Ahmed Hajdarović, Jovan Živadinović
Eegor	"Starac dana" (Старац дана)	Igor Mišković
Egret	"Ako shvatim kasno" (Ако схватим касно)	Petar Pupić
Empathy Soul Project	"Indigo" (Индиго)	Nenad Radaković
Filarri	"Posle mene" (После мене)	Teya Dora, Miloš Janošević
Filip Baloš	"Novi plan drugi san" (Нови план други сан)	Filip Baloš
Filip Žmaher	"Čujemo se sutra" (Чујемо се сутра)	Boban Janković, Filip Tančić, Aleksandar Mastelica
Frajle	"Neka, neka" (Нека, нека)	Nataša Mihajlović, Nevena Buča
Gift	"Liberta" (Либерта)	Jovan Matić
Hercenšlus	"Vremenska zona" (Временска зона)	Boban Dževerdanović
Hurricane	"Zumi zimi zami" (Зуми зими зами)	Nemanja Antonić, Ivan Vukajlović, Lena Kuzmanović
Igor Stanojević	"Iza duge" (Иза дуге)	Vladimir Graić
Igor Vins & Bane Lalić	"Zato što volim" (Зато што волим)	Igor Vins, Bane Lalić
Ivona	"U noćima" (У ноћима)	Ivona Pantelić
Jelena Vlahović	"Kao grom iz vedra neba" (Као гром из ведра неба)	Aleksandar Filipović, Branislav Klanšček
Luke Black	"Samo mi se spava" (Само ми се спава)	Luka Ivanović
Mattia Zanatta & Angela Kassiani	"Novi svet" (Нови свет)	Michele Bonivento, Mattia Zanatta, Predrag Cvetković
Milan Bujaković	"Fenomen" (Феномен)	Aleksandar Aleksov, Miro Buljan, Nenad Ćeranić, Dragiša Baša
Nađa	"Moj prvi ožiljak na duši" (Мој први ожиљак на души)	Kristina Kovač, Tim Gosden
Nadia	"Devojka tvog dečka" (Девојка твог дечка)	Konstantin Arsić, Nađa Terzić, Aleksa Vučković, Dimitrije Borčanin
Princ	"Cvet sa Istoka" (Цвет са Истока)	Dušan Bačić
Savo Perović	"Presidente"	Mahdi, Ivana Rašić Trmčić, Savo Perović
Stefan Shy	"Od jastuka do jastuka" (Од јастука до јастука)	Slavko Milovanović, Ana Sekulić
Tijana Dapčević	"Mamim" (Мамим)	Ana Radonjić
Zejna	"Rumba" (Румба)	Nikola Burovac, Miloš Roganović

== Contest overview ==
=== Semi-finals ===
The two semi-finals took place at the Studios 8 and 9 of RTS in Košutnjak, Belgrade on 1 and 2 March 2023. In each semi-final 16 songs competed and the eight qualifiers for the final were decided by a combination of votes from a jury panel consisting of Maja Cvetković (singer-songwriter), Ana Stanić (singer-songwriter), Vojislav Aralica (producer), Filip Bulatović (conductor) and Zoran Lesendrić (musician), and the Serbian public via SMS voting.

==== Semi-final 1 ====
In addition to the competing entries, former Eurovision contestant Konstrakta, who represented Serbia in 2022, was featured as the guest performer in the first semi-final.

Semi-final 1 – 1 March 2023
R/O	Artist	Song	Jury		Televote		Total	Place
R/O	Artist	Song	Votes	Points	Votes	Points	Total	Place
1	Mattia Zanatta & Angela Kassiani	"Novi svet"	34	7	742	0	7	9
2	Adem Mehmedović	"Osmeh"	10	1	445	0	1	15
3	Nađa	"Moj prvi ožiljak na duši"	48	10	3,178	7	17	1
4	Tijana Dapčević	"Mamim"	24	6	471	0	6	10
5	Princ	"Cvet sa Istoka"	7	0	5,911	12	12	3
6	Filip Baloš	"Novi plan drugi san"	21	5	2,712	6	11	4
7	Filip Žmaher	"Čujemo se sutra"	4	0	830	0	0	16
8	Luke Black	"Samo mi se spava"	11	2	4,388	8	10	6
9	Angellina	"Lanac"	11	3	1,004	0	3	12
10	Empathy Soul Project	"Indigo"	38	8	794	0	8	7
11	Stefan Shy	"Od jastuka do jastuka"	58	12	1,893	4	16	2
12	Hercenšlus	"Vremenska zona"	0	0	1,402	2	2	13
13	Savo Perović	"Presidente"	0	0	1,145	1	1	14
14	Igor Stanojević	"Iza duge"	8	0	2,598	5	5	11
15	Boris Subotić	"Nedostupan"	16	4	1,527	3	7	8
16	Chegi & Braća Bluz Band	"Svadba ili kavga"	0	0	4,389	10	10	5

Detailed jury votes
R/O	Song	M. Cvetković	A. Stanić	V. Aralica	F. Bulatović	Z. Lesendrić	Total	Points
1	"Novi svet"	7	8	7	6	6	34	7
2	"Osmeh"	2		2	4	2	10	1
3	"Moj prvi ožiljak na duši"	8	10	10	10	10	48	10
4	"Mamim"	3	4	6	7	4	24	6
5	"Cvet sa Istoka"	1		1	5		7	
6	"Novi plan drugi san"	5	5	4		7	21	5
7	"Čujemo se sutra"		1		2	1	4	
8	"Samo mi se spava"	6	2	3			11	2
9	"Lanac"		3		8		11	3
10	"Indigo"	12	7	8	3	8	38	8
11	"Od jastuka do jastuka"	10	12	12	12	12	58	12
12	"Vremenska zona"						0	
13	"Presidente"						0	
14	"Iza duge"	4			1	3	8	
15	"Nedostupan"		6	5		5	16	4
16	"Svadba ili kavga"						0	

==== Semi-final 2 ====
In addition to the competing entries, former Eurovision contestant Sanja Vučić, who represented Serbia in 2016 and as part of Hurricane in 2020 and 2021, singers Alen Ademović, Ivana Peters, Stevan Anđelković and Zorja, the bands Zbogom Brus Li and Biber, as well as the assemble Iskaz and the vocal chorus Luča were featured as guest performers in the second semi-final.

Semi-final 2 – 2 March 2023
R/O	Artist	Song	Jury		Televote		Total	Place
R/O	Artist	Song	Votes	Points	Votes	Points	Total	Place
1	Hurricane	"Zumi zimi zami"	27	6	1,607	3	9	6
2 (Note: Due to technical difficulties during her first performance, Nadia performed again after the last song.)	Nadia	"Devojka tvog dečka"	26	5	3,020	12	17	2
3	Filarri	"Posle mene"	28	7	1,779	5	12	4
4	Zejna	"Rumba"	43	10	1,754	4	14	3
5	Frajle	"Neka, neka"	22	3	2,125	7	10	5
6	Igor Vins & Bane Lalić	"Zato što volim"	6	1	504	0	1	13
7	Egret	"Ako shvatim kasno"	37	8	1,011	0	8	9
8	Dzipsii	"Greh"	58	12	2,887	10	22	1
9	Eegor	"Starac dana"	23	4	1,091	0	4	10
10	Jelena Vlahović	"Kao grom iz vedra neba"	0	0	1,138	1	1	12
11	Ivona	"U noćima"	2	0	781	0	0	15
12	Gift	"Liberta"	18	2	1,849	6	8	8
13	Milan Bujaković	"Fenomen"	0	0	1,600	2	2	11
14	Duo Grand	"Viva la Vida"	0	0	2,164	8	8	7
15	Andjela	"Loše procene"	0	0	956	0	0	14
16	Doris Milošević	"Tišina"	0	0	703	0	0	16

Detailed jury votes
R/O	Song	M. Cvetković	A. Stanić	V. Aralica	F. Bulatović	Z. Lesendrić	Total	Points
1	"Zumi zimi zami"	2	4	6	7	8	27	6
2	"Devojka tvog dečka"	5	5	8	4	4	26	5
3	"Posle mene"	8	2	3	8	7	28	7
4	"Rumba"	6	10	5	12	10	43	10
5	"Neka, neka"	4	3	7	3	5	22	3
6	"Zato što volim"	1		1	2	2	6	1
7	"Ako shvatim kasno"	7	8	10	6	6	37	8
8	"Greh"	12	12	12	10	12	58	12
9	"Starac dana"	10	6	2	5		23	4
10	"Kao grom iz vedra neba"						0	
11	"U noćima"		1			1	2	
12	"Liberta"	3	7	4	1	3	18	2
13	"Fenomen"						0	
14	"Viva la Vida"						0	
15	"Loše procene"						0	
16	"Tišina"						0	

=== Final ===
The final took place at the Studios 8 and 9 of RTS in Košutnjak, Belgrade on 4 March 2023 and featured the 16 qualifiers from the preceding two semi-finals. The winner, "Samo mi se spava" performed by Luke Black, was decided by a combination of votes from a jury panel consisting of Lena Kovačević (singer-songwriter), Dragan Đorđević (cellist), Nevena Božović (represented Serbia in the Eurovision Song Contest 2013 as part of Moje 3 and in 2019), Slobodan "Coby" Veljković (rapper, songwriter and producer) and Aleksandar Lokner (pianist), and the Serbian public via SMS voting. All funds collected from the viewer votes were donated to charity for the purchase of equipment for the Health Center in the municipality of Bojnik. The show was opened by a rendition of the British Eurovision Song Contest 1981 winning entry "Making Your Mind Up" by the four hosts, while the interval act featured a medley of songs by the Beatles to honour the hosting of the Eurovision Song Contest 2023 in Liverpool, performed by singers Dejan Cukić, Gordan Kičić, Iva Lorens, Naiva, Oliver Nektarijević and Srđan Gojković as well as the tribute band The Bestbeat. The arrangements of the songs were specifically done by The Bestbeat to compliment individual artists performing alongside them.

Final – 4 March 2023
R/O	Artist	Song	Jury		Televote		Total	Place
R/O	Artist	Song	Votes	Points	Votes	Points	Total	Place
1	Stefan Shy	"Od jastuka do jastuka"	32	7	6,131	4	11	6
2	Boris Subotić	"Nedostupan"	7	0	2,204	0	0	16
3	Nadia	"Devojka tvog dečka"	8	2	4,424	2	4	8
4	Duo Grand	"Viva la Vida"	4	0	3,005	0	0	14
5	Nađa	"Moj prvi ožiljak na duši"	52	12	8,111	6	18	3
6	Frajle	"Neka, neka"	3	0	3,715	0	0	13
7	Hurricane	"Zumi zimi zami"	0	0	3,874	1	1	12
8	Chegi & Braća Bluz Band	"Svadba ili kavga"	2	0	5,144	3	3	10
9	Dzipsii	"Greh"	25	5	11,582	8	13	5
10	Luke Black	"Samo mi se spava"	49	10	20,070	10	20	1
11	Filip Baloš	"Novi plan drugi san"	41	8	8,529	7	15	4
12	Princ	"Cvet sa Istoka"	31	6	20,398	12	18	2
13	Filarri	"Posle mene"	0	0	2,414	0	0	15
14	Gift	"Liberta"	17	4	3,155	0	4	9
15	Empathy Soul Project	"Indigo"	12	3	2,170	0	3	11
16	Zejna	"Rumba"	7	1	7,195	5	6	7

Detailed jury votes
R/O	Song	L. Kovačević	D. Đorđević	N. Božović	S. Veljković	A. Lokner	Total
1	"Od jastuka do jastuka"	7	8	10		7	32
2	"Nedostupan"	1		3	3		7
3	"Devojka tvog dečka"		1	2	4	1	8
4	"Viva la Vida"			4			4
5	"Moj prvi ožiljak na duši"	10	10	8	12	12	52
6	"Neka, neka"			1		2	3
7	"Zumi zimi zami"						0
8	"Svadba ili kavga"		2				2
9	"Greh"	5	3	5	6	6	25
10	"Samo mi se spava"	12	12	7	8	10	49
11	"Novi plan drugi san"	8	6	12	7	8	41
12	"Cvet sa Istoka"	4	7	6	10	4	31
13	"Posle mene"						0
14	"Liberta"	6	5		1	5	17
15	"Indigo"	3	4		2	3	12
16	"Rumba"	2			5		7

== Other awards ==
=== OGAE Serbia Award ===
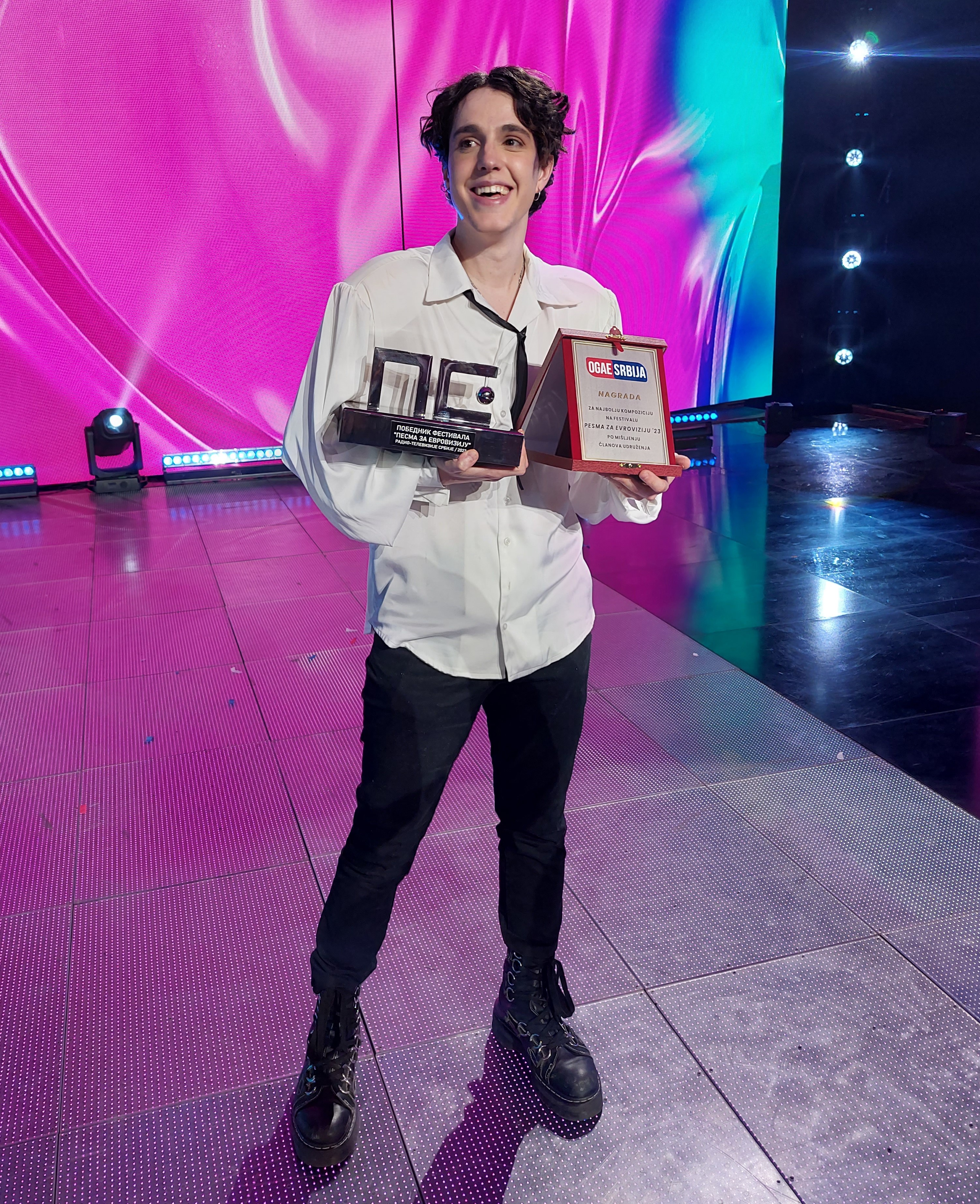
Luke Black with the Pesma za Evroviziju trophy (left) and the OGAE Serbia Award (right)

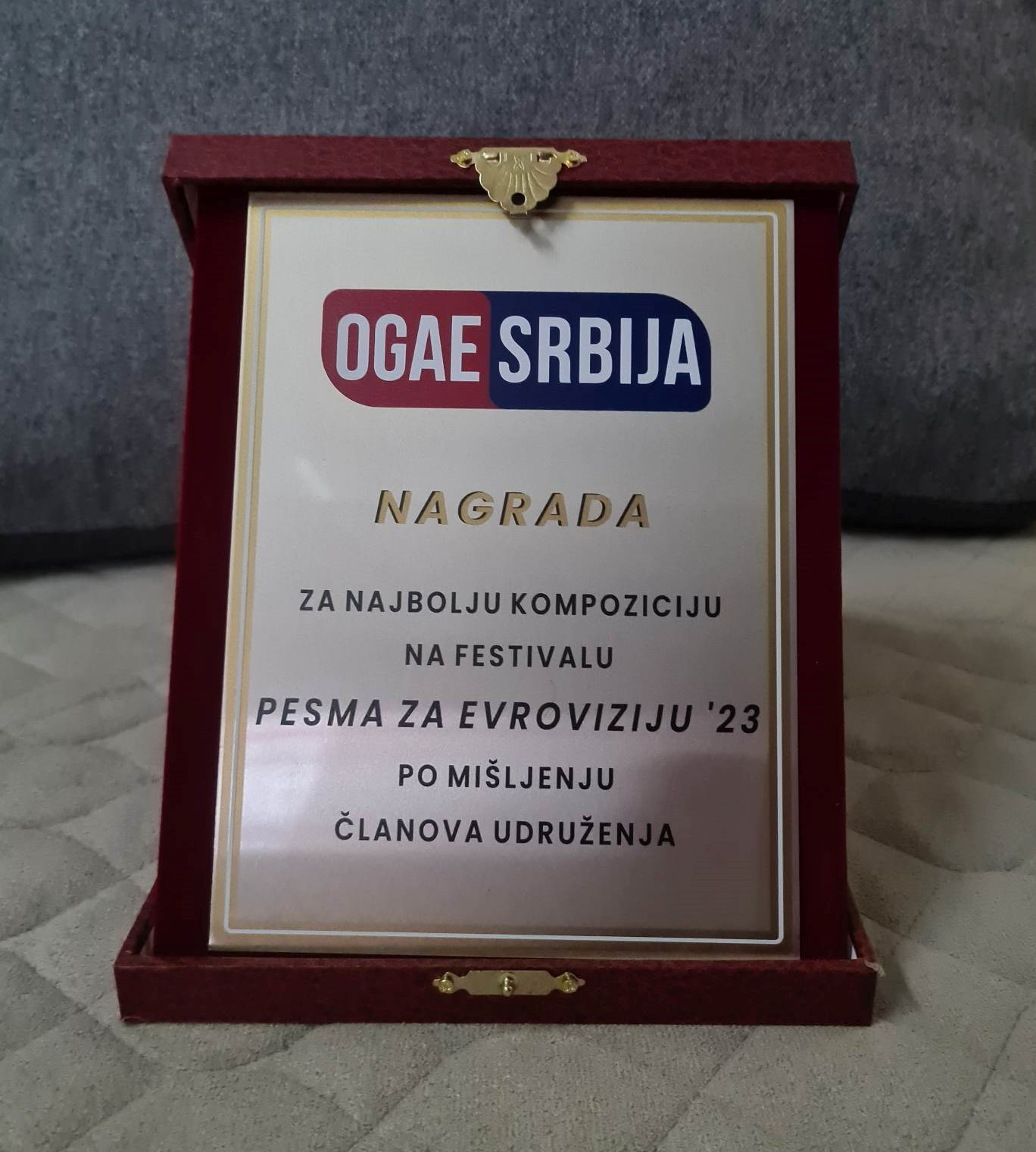
OGAE Serbia Awards 2023

OGAE Serbia Award for the best song on Pesma za Evroviziju '23 is voted on by the association members. The award was won by the winning song "Samo mi se spava" with 275 points. In second place, with 262 points, was "Novi plan drugi san" by Filip Baloš, while the third place went to Zejna and her song "Rumba" with 174 points.

Baloš was also the designated as the Serbian entrant to the OGAE Second Chance Contest.

Artist	Song	Points	Place
Luke Black	"Samo mi se spava"	275	1
Filip Baloš	"Novi plan drugi san"	262	2
Zejna	"Rumba"	174	3
Nađa	"Moj prvi ožiljak na duši"	148	4
Princ	"Cvet sa Istoka"	144	5
Dzipsii	"Greh"	144	5

== Broadcasts and ratings ==
The three shows were broadcast on RTS1, RTS Svet and RTS Planeta as well as streamed online via the broadcaster's website rts.rs, and the broadcaster's Eurovision dedicated Youtube channel.

Viewing figures by show on RTS1
Show	Air date	Average viewership	Total viewership	Share (%)	Ref.
Semi-final 1	1 March 2023	378,817	1,200,000	14.79%	
Semi-final 2	2 March 2023	335,747	1,100,000	13.07%	
Final	4 March 2023	488,087	1,500,000	18.87%	
