= One in a Million (Bosson album) =

Studio album by Bosson
- Released: 28 May 2001
- Recorded: 2000–2001
- Genre: Pop
- Length: 48:30
- Label: MNW

Bosson chronology
The Right Time (1998)	One in a Million (2001)	Rockstar (2003)

Singles from One in a Million
- 1. "One in a Million" Released: 15 June 2001; 2. "I Believe" Released: 2 November 2001; 3. "Over the Mountains" Released: 9 December 2001; 4. "This Is Our Life" Released: 2002

Professional ratings
Review scores
Source	Rating
AllMusic	2/5 stars

One in a Million is the second album by Bosson, the album was released on 28 May 2001.

== Singles ==
The first single, "One in a Million", which can also be found in the Miss Congeniality soundtrack, was nominated for a Best Original Song – Motion Picture at the 58th Golden Globe Awards.

The second single, "I Believe" also released and receive warm success.

== Track listing ==
No.	Title	Length
1.	"One in a Million"	3:34
2.	"I Believe"	3:51
3.	"We Live"	3:46
4.	"Where Are You?"	4:05
5.	"Over the Mountains"	4:13
6.	"Hole in My Heart"	3:00
7.	"I Don't Wanna Say Goodbye"	3:46
8.	"Stay"	3:20
9.	"All Because of You"	3:34
10.	"Let Your Soul Shine"	3:17
11.	"This Is Our Life"	4:00
12.	"We Will Meet Again"	4:35
13.	"One in a Million (Remix)"	3:29
14.	"I Believe (Boris Radio Version)"	3:44
Total length:		48:30

== Chart performance ==
Chart (2001)	Peak position
Austrian Albums (Ö3 Austria)	72
Finnish Albums (Suomen virallinen lista)	38
German Albums (Offizielle Top 100)	50
Norwegian Albums (VG-lista)	30
Swedish Albums (Sverigetopplistan)	21
Swiss Albums (Schweizer Hitparade)	43
