= Sandra Perović =

Serbian journalist

Sandra Perović (Serbian Cyrillic: Сандра Перовић) is a Serbian film critic and Radio Television Serbia journalist, TV author and editor.

== History ==
=== Early life ===
Sandra Perović completed primary and secondary education in Belgrade. She graduated from The University of Belgrade Faculty of Law, and obtained a postgraduate degree in film sciences and electronic media at The University of Belgrade Faculty of Dramatic Arts. Sandra Perović's father, Slavko, was a popular Yugoslavian singer.

=== Career ===
She holds a position of an editor in a Film and TV Series Redaction of Radio Television of Serbia, where she works as a journalist, film critic, author of specialized film programs – "The Big Illusion", FEST Chronicles, Auteur Film Festival, documentary and shorts festivals. Perović is a reporter and author of film segments in a primetime news show on Radio Television Serbia, "Dnevnik" and "Kulturi dnevnik". She covers Serbian films and authors who represent the culture of Serbia.

She was a board member at Film Center of Serbia, and board member of FEST. She was a jurist for The City of Belgrade Award in Film and Television, as well as a member of an international association of film critics FIPRESCI. She served in the critic's jury at the most prestigious world festivals – Cannes, Venice and Berlin.

She executed over 400 interviews with prominent figures in the world cinema, including – Oscar winners, actors and directors such as Oliver Stone, Claude Chabrol, Taviani brothers, Ken Loach, David Lynch, Michael Caine, Anthony Hopkins, Leonardo DiCaprio, Sean Connery, Nicolas Cage, Matt Damon, James Franco, Ralph Fiennes, Sharon Stone, Clive Owen, Tilda Swinton, Julianne Moore, Pierce Brosnan, Steve Martin, Bruce Willis, Jean Reno, Daniel Craig, Christin Scott Thomas, Penélope Cruz, Natalie Portman, Jeremy Irons, Paul Verhoeven, Angelina Jolie, Jeff Bridges, Halle Berry, Antonio Banderas, Benicio del Toro, Juliette Binoche, Harvey Keitel, Colin Farrell, Isabel Huppert, Catherine Deneuve, Aleksandr Sokurov, Nikita Mihalkov, Andrei Konchalovsky, Andrzej Waida and more.

== Awards ==
She was awarded "Kapetan Miša Anastasijević Award" for "the beauty of expression and engaged reporting". Hollywood Foreign Press Association (HFPA) – the association of foreign journalists accredited in Hollywood, has chosen Sandra Perović as a new voter for the awarding of the prestigious "Golden Globe" award, which is awarded to film and television both in America, as well as around the world.
