= Jače manijače =

1990 single by Dino Dvornik

Single by Dino Dvornik

from the album Kreativni nered
- English title: Harder, You Maniac
- A-side: "Biti sam"
- B-side: "Ella EE"
- Released: July 1990
- Recorded: 1990
- Studio: Studio Lisinski, Zagreb
- Genre: Funk; dance
- Label: Jugoton
- Composer(s): Dino Dvornik
- Lyricist(s): Rambo Amadeus
- Producer(s): Dino Dvornik

Dino Dvornik singles chronology
"Zašto praviš slona od mene" (1988)	"Jače manijače" / "Biti sam" (1990)	"Zmaja dah" (1990)

"Jače manijače" (transl. Harder, You Maniac) is a song by Croatian funk singer Dino Dvornik. The single also contains an instrumental version of the song. "Jače manijače" later became a commercial success after being released in July 1990 on 12-inch vinyl by Jugoton.

== Background ==
Dvornik met the Montenegrin musician Rambo Amadeus during recording of the song "Glupi Hit (Stupid hit)" from the album Hoćemo gusle in 1989. As the result of that friendship, Amadeus wrote the lyrics for the song.

== Composition ==
The song is in the style of funk and dance music that was in development in the former Yugoslavia. It was written in D major with a tempo of 120 BPM.

== Music video ==
The video was filmed in Zagreb and its surrounding areas. It was officially premiered on the third channel of HTV in the TV show DJ Is So Hot. The video was directed by Dinko Cepak and Tomislav Hleb. It was the first Croatian music video to be aired on MTV.

== Legacy ==
The Serbian band Zemlja gruva covered this song with permission from Dvornik's wife Danijela. Their version is firstly performed in 2011 and 2 years later recorded studio version.

== Personnel ==
- Zoran Šabijan – keyboards
- Mladen Baučić – saxophone
