= The Right Time (Bosson album) =

Studio album by Bosson
- Released: 1998
- Recorded: 1997–1998
- Genre: Pop, dance-pop
- Label: MNW, BAM

Bosson chronology
The Right Time (1998)	One in a Million (2002)

The Right Time is the first album by Swedish pop singer Bosson. It was released in 1998 under MNW and BAM.

== Track listing ==
No.	Title	Length
1.	"Love Has Got the Power"	3:52
2.	"Baby Don't Cry"	4:08
3.	"Right Time"	3:28
4.	"Always on My Mind"	5:15
5.	"It's Over Now"	5:31
6.	"We Live"	3:47
7.	"Is It Love"	3:46
8.	"Radio Interlude"	0:12
9.	"On the Radio"	3:42
10.	"I Love You"	4:01
11.	"When You Touch My Hand"	4:08
12.	"Something to Believe In"	3:47
13.	"Happy"	3:25
Total length:		49:02

== Singles ==
Baby Don't Cry

1. Baby Don't Cry (Radio Edit)
2. Baby Don't Cry (Extended Version)
3. Baby Don't Cry (Da Bump Remix)
4. Baby Don't Cry (Hard House Dub)

We Live

1. We Live (Radio Mix)
2. We Live (Album Mix)
3. We Live (Extended Album Mix)
4. We Live (Engines Garage Mix)

Right Time

1. Right Time
2. Right Time (Extended)
3. Right Time (Random Plaztic Mix, Short Version)
4. Right Time (Random Plaztic Mix, Long Version)
