= In corpore sano =

2022 single by Konstrakta

Single by Konstrakta

from the EP Triptih and the album Biti zdrava
- Language: Serbian; Latin
- English title: "In a Healthy Body"
- Released: 11 February 2022
- Genre: Avant-pop; art pop
- Length: 2:59
- Label: PGP-RTS
- Composers: Ana Đurić; Milovan Bošković
- Lyricist: Ana Đurić

Konstrakta singles chronology
"Neam šamana" (2020)	"In corpore sano" (2022)	"Mekano" (2022)

Music video
- "In corpore sano" on YouTube

Eurovision Song Contest 2022 entry
- Country: Serbia

Finals performance
- Semi-final result: 3rd
- Semi-final points: 237
- Final result: 5th
- Final points: 312

Entry chronology
- ◄ "Loco loco" (2021)
- "Samo mi se spava" (2023) ►

Official performance video
- "In corpore sano" (Second Semi-Final) on YouTube "In corpore sano" (Grand Final) on YouTube

"In corpore sano" (Ecclesiastical Latin: [iŋ ˈkorpore ˈsano], Classical Latin: [ɪŋ ˈkɔrpɔrɛ ˈsaːnoː]; transl. "In a Healthy Body") is a single by Serbian singer-songwriter Konstrakta. It was released on 11 February 2022 through PGP-RTS as part of her three-song project Triptih. It was written by the artist alongside Milovan Bošković. The song represented Serbia in the Eurovision Song Contest 2022 in Turin, Italy, after winning Pesma za Evroviziju '22, Serbia's national final. In the final of the contest, it placed fifth and broke Serbia's record for the most points received.

Entering Pesma za Evroviziju '22 as an underdog to promote Triptih, Konstrakta gained mass popularity after her performance in the first semi-final. Her avant-garde song and performance have been variably characterized as satire, irony, or critique of the Serbian healthcare system, mass media, the COVID-19 pandemic, and beauty standards, and how all of these factors distract from the importance of mental health. The performance itself has also been compared to the works of Serbian performance artist Marina Abramović.

== Background ==
Konstrakta applied for Pesma za Evroviziju '22 with the goal of promoting her three-song project Triptih (Triptych) of which "In corpore sano" is a part, alongside "Nobl" (Noble) and "Mekano" (Soft). As she revealed, "In corpore sano" fit the Pesma za Evroviziju ’22 requirements, being three minutes long, which was the reason why this exact song was chosen to be applied with. She also revealed that she did not apply for the competition herself.

Triptih was released on 28 February 2022. It is a 12-minute long music video which features all three songs. Its concept was created by Konstrakta herself, alongside Ana Rodić and its director Maja Uzelac. The video and the songs illustrate modern-day life in Serbia, each of them in its own way. On 23 June 2023, Triptih was rereleased by Gruvlend! and Virgin in form of an extended play.

== Composition and conception ==
=== Music and lyrics ===
"In corpore sano" was composed by Konstrakta and Milovan Bošković, with lyrics written by Konstrakta herself. Sonically, it is an experimental, avant-pop and art pop song that, according to Ellie Muir of The Independent, "evokes the music of Kraftwerk". Classic FM's Kyle Macdonald also noticed an influence of Gregorio Allegri's Miserere.

The song begins with the artist wondering what the secret behind Meghan Markle's healthy hair is and suggests "deep hydration", before going on to describe in an ironic tone various medical conditions whose symptoms make skin and hair "ugly". The hook then features the artist hypnotically chanting that a female artist has to be healthy ("Umetnica mora biti zdrava!"). The second verse takes on a more positive tone and describes her walks with her dog, while trusting her heart and her autonomic nervous system to take care of her health "on their own". It features further chants, "Bože zdravlja!" (transl. "God grant us health!"), which resemble Gregorian chants and which are inspired by Juvenal's quote "Orandum est ut sit mens sana in corpore sano" (transl. "You should pray for a healthy mind in a healthy body") from his work Satire X. The third verse starts off with the statement "Nemam knjižicu" (transl. "I don't have health insurance") referencing the fact that the Serbian healthcare system does not provide free healthcare to artists. The outro, sung in Latin, depicts a deteriorating state of mind by replacing adjectives in the original Latin saying from "Healthy mind in a healthy body" to "Weak mind/sad soul/desperate mind/frightened mind in a healthy body". The song abruptly concludes with a rhetorical question "I šta ćemo sad?" (transl. "So what do we do now?").

=== Performance ===
The "In corpore sano" segment of Triptih, as well as her performance on Pesma za Evroviziju '22, featured Konstrakta obsessively washing her hands in a basin while surrounded by five backup singers, including co-writer Bošković, dressed as priests. On Pesma za Evroviziju '22, she wore the white uniform of a worker at a health spa as she sang the lyrics. The performance immediately attracted comparisons to Marina Abramović and her work Art Must Be Beautiful..., originally performed in 1975 in Copenhagen, which featured Abramović repetitively combing her hair and chanting "Art must be beautiful, artist must be beautiful". In an interview with Jutarnji list, Konstrakta revealed that the reference to Abramović was intentional, but put in a new context. On a different occasion, she revealed that the song needed a "compulsive aspect", and she chose it to be hand washing. She also stated that the carnation that she wore on her uniform was a symbol of love, understanding and respect. In the grand final of Eurovision, she wore sandals popularly called borosanas due to being produced exclusively in Borovo, Croatia. The shoes were a symbol of female factory workers in socialist Yugoslavia, but their popularity decreased after the country's breakup. Konstrakta insisted on wearing them during the performance, so a pair was sent to her from Zagreb by Dejan Aćimović via Zrinko Ogresta.

=== Interpretations ===
"In corpore sano" has a lot of accompanying content, under the umbrella topic of attitude towards health. I can't cover everything, but I'm singling out the attitude that goes from "has to" to "can". (Note: The first hook of the song features the artist chanting "Umetnica mora biti zdrava" (transl. "The artist, she has to be healthy"), while the second one features the artist chanting "Umetnica može biti zdrava" (transl. "The artist, she can be healthy.").) On one hand, we're living in an atmosphere [of fear] where health is represented as a life value that requires huge spending. Health is talked about as something that is fully under our control, only if we do this, buy that, follow the new trend, listen to that... One has to be healthy. That's the pressure that leaves us in fear. On the other hand, it's possible to achieve a common sense attitude in which health is under our control to some extent, and in which, accordingly, illness and ultimately death are accepted with less fear. And the systematic support is thin, unfortunately, equally in the healthcare system and the education system. Healthcare is becoming more and more inaccessible and expensive... And so on.

— Konstrakta talking about why she thinks "In corpore sano" could be the right entry for Eurovision

Initially, the song was believed to be an homage to Miroslav Ničić, guitarist of the band Zemlja gruva! of which Konstrakta was a member, who had no health insurance and subsequently died from leukemia. Konstrakta denied that, claiming that the song has multiple layers and meanings other than health, and that it's open to interpretation. When asked by Informer to explain the Meghan Markle reference, she mysteriously replied that she decided to name-drop Markle because "the newspapers say she has beautiful hair... Even more beautiful than Kate Middleton's hair, let's not lie to ourselves. Kate has beautiful hats, and Meghan has beautiful hair. Meghan is also exiled, and we support exiled people." Later, she revealed that Markle is just a symbol representing the people in the media we are focused on.

Serbian portal Glossy opined that the hook of "In corpore sano" refers to the pressure to be beautiful that women, especially female artists, face. Furthermore, Glossy claimed that the meaning behind the first verse is the self-diagnosing that artists are forced to do because they have no health insurance, which is something that the upper class of society doesn't have to worry about, which they thought explains name-dropping Meghan Markle. The hand washing and the Latin outro are explained as a reference to the COVID-19 pandemic and mental health, respectively. The optimism of the second verse and the abrupt ending of the song followed by a rhetorical question were explained as the artist relaxing her thoughts and trusting God with her health. Tena Šarčević of the Croatian portal Glazba.hr thought that the song talks about artists being underpaid, which leaves a mark on their physical and mental health. She also thought that Konstrakta satirizes the digital age we're living in by using a computer voice in the song, and explained the reference to Meghan Markle's hair as a critique of the superficiality of mainstream media. Oliver Rainbird of Wiwibloggs linked the reference to Meghan Markle's healthy hair, the hook and the Latin outro to media presuming artists are healthy as long as they look well, while completely neglecting their mental health.

Portal Buka drew a comparison between Konstrakta's and Marina Abramović's performances and chants, stating that Konstrakta washes her hands over and over again while wondering what the secret behind healthy hair and skin is in the same manner Abramović combs her hair over and over again to make herself beautiful so that people would pay attention to her art. Hrvoje Horvat of Večernji list thought that the costume Konstrakta wore during the performance represents the "nurse of the mass media", ironizing the culture of health and desirable appearance. Rainbird interpreted the hand washing as Konstrakta doing her best to remain healthy since she, as an independent artist, cannot afford to fall ill as she does not have health insurance.

== Live performances ==
=== Pesma za Evroviziju '22 ===
Out of two semi-finals, "In corpore sano" competed in the first semi-final with 17 other songs. In each semi-final, eighteen songs competed and the nine qualifiers for the final were decided by a combination of votes from a jury panel and the Serbian public. "In corpore sano" was chosen as one of the nine songs to qualify.

The final took place on 5 March 2022, and featured all eighteen qualifying songs. The winner was decided by a 50/50 combination of votes from a jury panel and the Serbian public. "In corpore sano" won both the jury and the public televote, therefore winning the final with a maximum 24 points.

=== Promotion ===
Konstrakta performed "In corpore sano" at the Israel Calling Eurovision pre-party in Tel Aviv on 7 April 2022, to positive feedback. Due to technical issues, she performed alone on stage and used hotel towels for the performance. Two days later, she performed the song on the third episode of the tenth season of Zvijezde pjevaju, the Croatian version of Just the Two of Us, on HRT 1.

To further promote the song, Konstrakta teamed up with Metalac which produced a limited series of 500 sets of basins and jugs. The sets were identical to the set Konstrakta would eventually use for her performance at the Eurovision, costed 5,000 RSD each and all the revenue from them was donated to the National Association of Parents of Children with Cancer (NURDOR).

=== At Eurovision ===
According to Eurovision rules, all nations with the exceptions of the host country and the "Big Five" (France, Germany, Italy, Spain and the United Kingdom) are required to qualify from one of two semi-finals in order to compete for the final; the top ten countries from each semi-final progress to the final. The European Broadcasting Union (EBU) split up the competing countries into six different pots based on voting patterns from previous contests, with countries with favourable voting histories put into the same pot. On 25 January 2022, an allocation draw was held which placed each country into one of the two semi-finals, as well as which half of the show they would perform in.

Serbia had been placed into the second semi-final, which was held on 12 May 2022, and had been scheduled to perform in third place in the first half of the show. Largely replicating her performance at Pesma za Evroviziju '22, with several altered details and added occasional English subtitles, Konstrakta qualified for the final where she performed in 24th place in the running order. In the process, she became the first act to perform in Latin at the Eurovision Song Contest. In the final on 14 May 2022, Konstrakta won 87 points from the juries (including two sets of 12 points from Montenegro and Croatia) and 225 points from the public (including five sets of 12 points from Montenegro, Croatia, North Macedonia, Slovenia and Switzerland), amassing a total of 312 points and placing fifth (behind Ukraine, the United Kingdom, Spain and Sweden). Furthermore, she broke Serbia's record for the most absolute points received in a final, which previously was 268 and was set in 2007.

== Critical reception ==
Tena Šarčević of Glazba.hr described the song as an "absolute masterpiece", claiming that it "screams powerful social and political messages on so many levels, while being wonderfully entertaining". Hrvoje Horvat of Večernji list thought the song was humorous and camp, stating that he preferred it to his native Croatia's Eurovision entry "Guilty Pleasure" by Mia Dimšić, and that he believed in the song's success in Turin. Writing for Ravno Do Dna, Zoran Stajčić described "In corpore sano" as an "exact example of how pop has to be thought out. That is not idiotic degradation, but intelligence and originality above all, and then the ability to shape it and present it as an interesting idea". Edo Plovanić of Muzika.hr thought that "it is a good thing for [ex-Yugoslavian] regional music" that authenticity, unexpectedness and desire for something new won. Jack Royston of Newsweek characterized the song as "bizarre pop". In her blog, Vedrana Rudan called Konstrakta "phenomenal", stating that she sent a message that "artists have a right to live, to be healthy, because art is what is important in a society." However, writing for Index.hr, Ivan Tomašić opined that Konstrakta was hypocritical for criticizing the urban middle class while focusing on people in the media. He claimed that her performance wouldn't have received an equal amount of attention if it had been performed in Belgrade's Museum of Contemporary Art instead of Pesma za Evroviziju '22; therefore she profited from people's focus on the media and became what she was satirizing.

"In corpore sano" was praised by fellow musicians, including Bilja Krstić, Lena Kovačević, Jelena Tomašević and Bora Đorđević. Đorđević compared it to the works of Rambo Amadeus, particularly to his Eurovision 2012 entry "Euro Neuro". Marija Šerifović, the winner of the Eurovision Song Contest 2007, praised Konstrakta on Twitter. Croatian musician Ida Prester, in an interview with Gloria, praised the song and the artist herself calling her eccentric, cynical and a genius. Sara Jo, whose song "Muškarčina" (Manly Man) finished second on Pesma za Evroviziju '22, praised Konstrakta calling her "magical", a "synonym for authenticity", an "inspiration and a reminder how beautiful it is to be uncompromisingly yourself". Aca Lukas, whose song "Oskar" (Oscar) finished fifth on Pesma za Evroviziju '22, stated that he did not like the song at all and speculated that, if he had "washed his feet [on stage]", maybe he would've won.

=== Awards and nominations ===
Year	Award	Category	Outcome	Ref.
2022	Pesma za Evroviziju '22		1st place	
2022	Eurovision Song Contest		5th place	
2022	Eurovision Awards	Best lyrics	Won	
2022	Eurovision Awards	Best choreography	Nominated	
2022	Eurovision Awards	Most Innovative Staging	Won	
2022	Marcel Bezençon Awards	Artistic Award	Won	
2023	Music Awards Ceremony	Alternative Pop Song of the Year	Nominated	

== Commercial performance ==
A day after her victory on Pesma za Evroviziju '22, the video of Konstrakta's performance in the first semi-final reached number one on YouTube trending charts in all former Yugoslav republics apart from Slovenia, where it reached number three. Apart from the said countries, it trended in nine more European countries. Within the first two days, the video accumulated 3.5 million views on the platform. Eventually, it reached number one on YouTube trending charts in Slovenia, Austria, Switzerland and Malta.

Konstrakta's performance started a trend on TikTok, where users replicated the part of the choreography during the song's chorus. On Genius, the lyrics of the song reached number two on the weekly trending charts.

In the week of 19 March 2022, "In corpore sano" debuted at number one on Billboard's Croatia Songs chart, spending two weeks at the top.

After Eurovision, the song entered the top 20 on Spotify Viral 50 in more than 30 countries, reaching the top 10 in 18 of those, and entering the top 5 in 7 countries. The song peaked at number 7 on Spotify's Viral 50 - Global chart.

Konstrakta reached 1.3 million monthly listeners on Spotify, thus becoming the first Serbian artist who achieved that success.

== Charts ==
Chart performance for "In corpore sano"
Chart (2022)	Peak position
Croatia (Billboard)	1
Greece (IFPI Greece)	39
Iceland (Tónlistinn)	15
Lithuania (AGATA)	11
Netherlands (Single Tip)	19
Serbia (Radiomonitor)	1
Sweden (Sverigetopplistan)	63

== Release history ==
Release history and formats for "In corpore sano"
Region	Date	Format	Label	Ref.
Various	11 February 2022	Digital download; streaming	PGP-RTS	
Various	23 June 2023	Digital download; streaming	Gruvlend!; Virgin	

== See also ==
- List of number-one singles of 2022 (Croatia)
