= Konstrakta =

Serbian singer-songwriter (born 1978)

Konstrakta Констракта
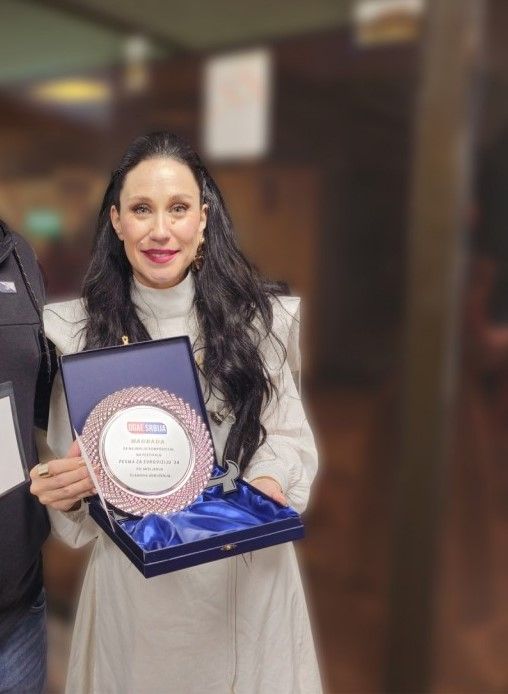
- Konstrakta in 2024

Background information
- Also known as: Ana Đurić; Constructa
- Born: Ana Ignjatović; 12 October 1978 (age 47); Belgrade, SR Serbia, SFR Yugoslavia
- Genres: Pop-rock; indie-pop; avant-pop; art pop; jazz
- Occupations: Singer; songwriter
- Years active: 1997–present
- Labels: PGP-RTS; Croatia Records

Ana Đurić (Note: Serbian Cyrillic: Ана Ђурић, pronounced [âna dʑǔːritɕ].) (née Ignjatović; (Note: Serbian Cyrillic: Игњатовић, pronounced [iɡɲǎːtoʋitɕ].) born 12 October 1978), known professionally as Konstrakta, (Note: Serbian Cyrillic: Констракта, pronounced [kŏnstrǎ:ktâ].) is a Serbian singer and songwriter. She had risen to prominence as the lead vocalist of the indie pop band Zemlja gruva!, which was founded in 2007, before pursuing her solo career in 2019. She gained more significant recognition by representing Serbia in the Eurovision Song Contest 2022 with the song "In corpore sano", finishing in fifth place.

== Career ==
=== 2007–2018: Zemlja gruva! ===
She debuted as a member of the lesser-known electronic group called MistakeMistake in the early 2000s, but gained initial recognition as the lead singer of the Belgrade-based band Zemlja gruva!. Together they released three studio albums: WTF Is Gruveland? (2010), Dino u Zemlji Gruva (2013), which covered songs by Croatian singer Dino Dvornik, and Šta stvarno želiš? (2016). Some of the band's best-known hits include "Najlepše želje" (2010), "Nisam znala da sam ovo htela" (2011), and "Jače manijače" (2013). Zemlja gruva! took part in Beovizija music festival in 2008 and 2009 with "Čudesni svetovi" and "Svejedno mi je", respectively.

=== 2019–2022: Solo beginnings and Eurovision Song Contest ===
Konstrakta pursued her solo career with the release of the single "Žvake" in June 2019. In March 2020, she released "Neam šamana", inspired by a tabloid article about Emina Jahović seeking help from a shaman to overcome her divorce from Mustafa Sandal.

On 28 February 2022, Konstrakta released her project Triptih (Triptych), a 12-minute music video for three songs – "Nobl" (Noble), "In corpore sano" (In a Healthy Body) and "Mekano" (Soft). The project's concept was created by Konstrakta herself, alongside Ana Rodić and Maja Uzelac, the latter of whom also directed the video. The video and the songs illustrate modern-day life in Serbia, each focusing on a particular aspect.

On 8 February 2022, the song "In corpore sano" was announced as one of the 36 entries for the national selection festival broadcast on Radio Television of Serbia to choose Serbia's representative for the Eurovision Song Contest 2022. Entering the competition as an underdog, Konstrakta quickly acquired popularity following her performance in the first semi-final on 3 March, where she placed second and thus qualified for the final. In the final, which was held on 5 March, "In corpore sano" won both the jury vote and the public vote, receiving 31.34% of the public votes and therefore winning the competition. Next to the overwhelming support from the Serbian public, Konstrakta also received open praise from numerous regional public figures, such as the likes of Porfirije, Serbian Patriarch, and Novak Djokovic. She also received praise from fellow musicians and composers such as Tonči Huljić for both her lyrics, music and visuals.

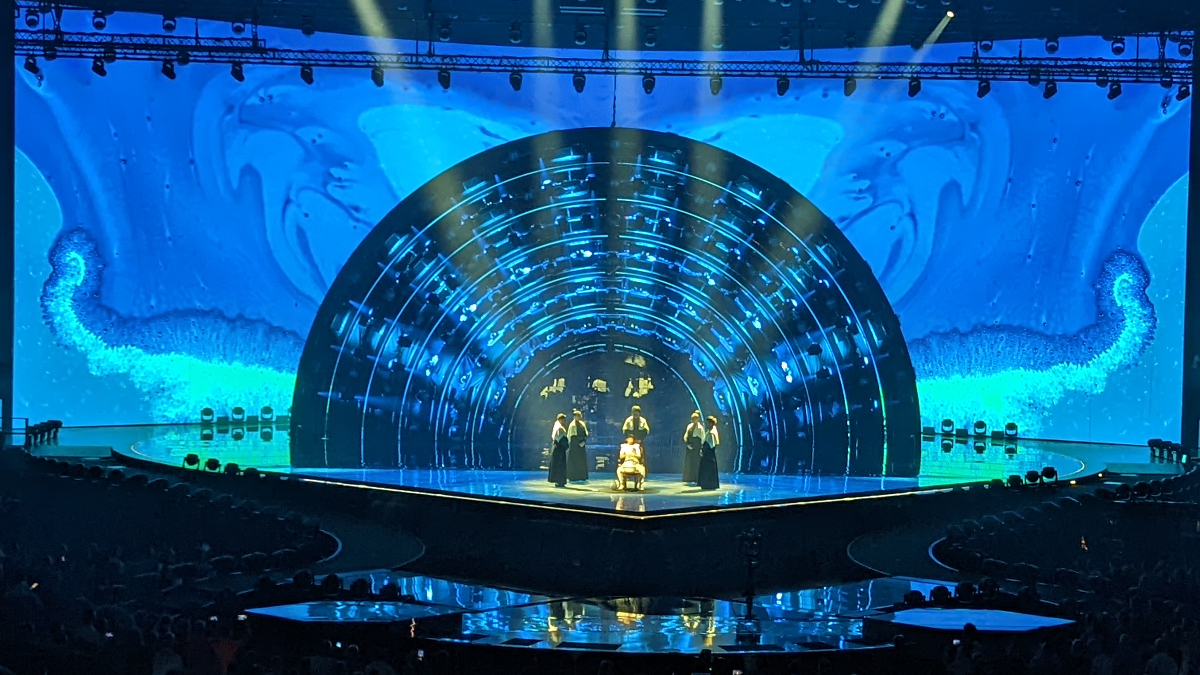
Konstrakta performing in the Second Semi-final at the Eurovision Song Contest 2022 in Turin, Italy.

During the second semi-final of Eurovision, held on 12 May, Konstrakta performed third and qualified to the grand final. It was later revealed that she was the second runner-up of the evening with 237 points. On 14 May, Konstrakta performed second to last in the finale, placing fifth overall with 312 points. On the evening of the final, she won the Artistic Marcel Bezençon Award. She also received an award from the Polish media for the most creative entry.

In late May 2022, Konstrakta performed for the first time after Eurovision at Sea Star Festival in Umag, Croatia to estimated crowd of close to 20,000 people. Subsequently, Konstrakta and Zemlja gruva! became the first local headliners on the main stage of Exit in July 2022.

=== 2023–present ===
In January 2023, Konstrakta performed alongside the band Koikoi at the Eurosonic Noorderslag music showcase festival in Groningen. On 1 March, Konstrakta premiered "Evo, obećavam!" (Here, I Promise!) during the first semi-final of the Serbian national selection competition for the Eurovision Song Contest 2023. The single was written in an omnibus form, and is split into three parts: "Depresivna sam" (I'm Depressed), "Anksiozan sam" (I'm Anxious) and "Obećaj mi" (Promise Me), dealing with the issues of depression and anxiety. The music video was released the same night, and is separated into three parts corresponding to the song, each of which was directed by a separate director.

On 21 December 2023, she was announced among the participants of Pesma za Evroviziju '24, Serbia's national final for the Eurovision Song Contest 2024, with the song "Novo, bolje" (New, Better). After a performance that was self-referential, self-parodying and heavily influenced by the performance of "In corpore sano" from two years before, the song qualified for the final where it finished fourth. Inspired by Aleksandar Vučić's slogan "Faster, stronger, better", the song deals with politicians' empty promises of a better future; the performance was almost the same as the one from two years before, as a metaphor for the change that never comes.

On 19 September 2024, she held the first solo concert in the renovated Sava Centar with Zemlja gruva!.

In 2025, she released 4 singles as a part of the Skup slova (A bunch of letters) project, touching on technology, people's relationship with it, as well as AI.

== Personal life ==
Ignjatović is the daughter of the former minister of information in the government of the Federal Republic of Yugoslavia, Slobodan Ignjatović. Her father comes from the village of Glibovac.

She graduated from the Faculty of Architecture, University of Belgrade.

Ignjatović married architect, Milan Đurić in 2009, with whom she has a son named Nikola and a daughter named Lena.

In 2020, she was one of the participants in the conference on smoking prevention "Can you hear me?".

Since 2023, Konstrakta has been an ambassador of the Media Initiatives and Partnerships Support program (Nova pismenost), which focuses on improving media and digital literacy. This program is implemented by Propulsion together with the United States Agency for International Development (USAID).

== Artistry ==
Serbian journalist and music critic Petar "Peca" Popović attributed the singer's success to her "originality and literacy", which he saw to be "in collision" with all the pop, folk and turbo-folk music widespread in Serbia and the ex-Yugoslav region. He saw Konstrakta as rising above the existing genres and "offering a different universe" in 2022. Her music was seen as a "representation of the world, the ground, the climate, art and culture to which she and many people belong". Gorčin Stojanović, the art director of the Yugoslav Drama Theatre, commented "in the socio-political turmoil which is present for decades in the region, Ana Đurić is the embodiment of the metropolis". A member of the Eurovision panel described her as "musically interesting, weirdish, untypically Eurovision-like".

Đurić possesses the vocal range of a contralto.

== Influence and legacy ==
The lyrics of "In corpore sano" became widely referenced by the public on social media and used in various parodies, sketches and reworks due to its "memeability and virability". She was also supported by people from many different political parties, including liberals and nationalists. Konstrakta herself revealed that she was "scared of the lack of negative criticism of what she does".

Furthermore, shortly after achieving the "pop stardom" status many soap and shampoo companies offered the singer deals to promote their products. Konstrakta received the honorary "Award for Architectural Event of the Year" from the Association of Belgrade Architects in July 2022. Serbian magazine Nedeljnik declared Konstrakta the person of the year 2022.

== Discography ==
Konstrakta discography
- EPs: 1
- Compilation albums: 1
- Singles: 19

=== Compilation albums ===
Title	Details
Biti zdrava (with Zemlja gruva!)	Released: 10 July 2023; Label: UMG Recordings; Format: Digital download, streaming

=== Extended plays ===
Title	Details
Triptih	Released: 23 June 2023; Label: Gruvlend!, Virgin; Format: Digital download, streaming

=== Singles ===
Title	Year	Peak chart positions							Album
Title	Year	SRB	CRO Billb.	GRE	ISL	LTU	NLD Tip	SWE	Album
"Žvake"	2019	—	(Note: Croatia Songs was launched on 15 February 2022.)	—	—	—	—	—	Biti zdrava
"Neam šamana"	2020	—	(Note: Croatia Songs was launched on 15 February 2022.)	—	—	—	—	—	Biti zdrava
"In corpore sano"	2022	7	1	80	15	11	19	63	Triptih and Biti zdrava
"Mekano"	2022	—	—	—	—	—	—	—	Triptih and Biti zdrava
"Nobl"	2022	—	—	—	—	—	—	—	Triptih and Biti zdrava
"Evo, obećavam!"	2023	—	—	—	—	—	—	—	Biti zdrava
"Put" (with Magnifico)	2023	—	—	—	—	—	—	—	Muzika iz filma Čuvari formule
"O, klasje moje" (with Zemlja gruva!)	2023	—	—	—	—	—	—	—	Muzika iz serije Lektizer
"Novo, bolje"	2024	—	—	—	—	—	—	—	Non-album singles
"Zabava"	2024	—	—	—	—	—	—	—	Non-album singles
"S tabo ali brez" (with Zemlja gruva! and Maša Slapar)	2025	—	—	—	—	—	—	—	Čao Bela (Official Soundtrack)
"Šta će meni ko"	2025	—	—	—	—	—	—	—	Skup slova
"Zauvek, sine"	2025	—	—	—	—	—	—	—	Skup slova
"Muve"	2025	—	—	—	—	—	—	—	Skup slova
"Lorem ipsum"	2025	—	—	—	—	—	—	—	Skup slova
"Prva"	2026	—	—	—	—	—	—	—	KZE '26
"Slepi vode slepe"	2026	—	—	—	—	—	—	—	KZE '26
"Srce"	2026	—	—	—	—	—	—	—	KZE '26
"Kamen" (with Vibin wit DJ Mono and Who See)	2026	—	—	—	—	—	—	—	Non-album single
"—" denotes a recording that did not chart or was not released in that territory.

== Awards and nominations ==
List of awards and nominations of Konstrakta
Year	Award	Category	Nominee/work	Result	Ref.
2022	Marcel Bezençon Awards	The Artistic Award	Herself	Won	
2022	Eurovision Awards	Most Innovative Staging	Herself	Won	
2022	Eurovision Awards	Best Lyrics	"In corpore sano"	Won	
2022	Eurovision Awards	Best Choreography	Herself	Nominated	
2022	Ivan Radenković Award	Socio-Critical Engagement	Triptih	Won	
2023	Music Awards Ceremony	Alternative Pop Song of the Year	"In corpore sano"	Nominated	
2023	Music Awards Ceremony	Contribution to International Music	Herself	Won	
2023	Music Awards Ceremony	Golden MAC for Authenticity	Herself	Won	
2023	BeFem Awards	Feminist Contribution to Pop Culture	Herself	Won	

== Notes ==
Awards and achievements
Preceded by Hurricane with "Loco loco"	Serbia in the Eurovision Song Contest; 2022	Succeeded by Luke Black with "Samo mi se spava"
