= Spinnup =

- Parent company: Universal Music Group
- Founded: March 15, 2013; 13 years ago
- Defunct: December 1, 2022; 3 years ago
- Status: Defunct
- Genre: Various
- Country of origin: Sweden
- Location: Worldwide
- Official website: www.spinnup.com

Spinnup was a digital music distribution service owned by Universal Music Group. It was founded in early 2013 in Sweden. Spinnup is a signed distribution platform that offers an aggregator service to musicians and artist who are not signed to major labels so they can distribute their music worldwide via online retailers such as Deezer, Spotify, iTunes, Apple Music, Tidal, Napster, Amazon Music and Google Play.

As a Universal Music company, a key feature of Spinnup is being able to help independent artists get signed by Universal Music's labels. As of June 2019, 58 Spinnup artists had been discovered and signed to UMG labels.

== History and overview ==
Spinnup was founded and launched by Universal Music in Sweden in 2013. Spinnup operates in Sweden, Denmark, UK, France, Norway and Germany but is available worldwide for distribution.

In July 2014 Spinnup launched in the UK, the same month as Albin, a Swedish artist who signed a record deal with Universal Music after using Spinnup to distribute his track "Din Soldat", reached number one in Sweden with the song. Later that year Swedish house music duo Vigiland followed with a record contract with Universal Music after emerging through Spinnup.

New artists who have signed record deals after using Spinnup include LOVA, Vigiland, Albin, Mavrick, and Jireel in Sweden. Model Aeroplanes were the first UK band to earn themselves a record deal after signing to Island Records through Spinnup in 2015. Since launching in France in late 2016, 10 French Spinnup artists have been signed to Universal Music labels, including Sad And Insane, Asakura, ZeGuerre, and Maes.

In late 2016 Spinnup announced it had reached over 100,000 registered artists on the platform.

In May 2017, Spinnup celebrated its 31st artist signing to Universal Music with Swedish artist Milwin, and now has had 58 artists signed to Universal Music labels around the world.

At the 2019 Eurovision Song Contest, Maltese contestant Michela performed her song 'Chameleon', which was distributed on Spinnup before she was signed by Universal Music Austria.

On May 18, 2022, Spinnup made their website exclusive to only a select few artists, whereas it was previously accessible to anyone.

On October 4, 2022, an email was sent to the artists on the platform telling them that the service were going to close permanently on December 1, 2022.

== Stream Your Dream ==
In March 2015 Spinnup and GAFFA launched the song contest "Stream Your Dream". The contest was based on the artist uploading his or her song at Spinnup, where the three artists who measured the most streams were selected to perform at the final event on May 29 at Göta Källare in Stockholm, Sweden. The winner of the contest later was Melina Borglow.
