= Mila (album) =

2025 album by Princ

Studio album by Princ
- Released: 2 May 2025
- Length: 36:10
- Language: Serbian
- Label: PGP-RTS; Croatia Records
- Producer: Željko Joksimović

Mila (Serbian Cyrillic: Мила; transl. Darling) is the debut studio album by Serbian singer Princ. It was released on 2 May 2025 by PGP-RTS and Croatia Records.

The album features the singles "Cvet sa istoka", with which Princ finished second at Pesma za Evroviziju '23, and the title track "Mila", which represented Serbia at the Eurovision Song Contest 2025 after winning Pesma za Evroviziju '25.

== Background ==
Princ had been working on his debut studio album from December 2022 to 2025. The album was written, recorded and produced in Belgrade, and it includes their two submissions to Pesma za Evroviziju ("Cvet sa Istoka" and "Mila").

== Singles ==
On 12 December 2022, "Samo mi je lepo" was released as the first single from the album. The following month, it was announced that Princ would participate in the Pesma za Evroviziju '23 with the song "Cvet sa istoka", which was released as the second single on 3 February 2023 and finished in second place in the contest. After he released seven singles in 2023 and 2024, in December 2024, Princ was announced as a contestant in Pesma za Evroviziju '25 with the title track "Mila". It was released as a single on 27 January 2025 and won the afformentioned competition on 28 February.

== Track listing ==
No.	Title	Length
1.	"Mila"	2:58
2.	"Mirno" (featuring Goca Tržan)	3:03
3.	"Ajša"	3:00
4.	"Paučina" (featuring Šejla Zonić)	3:02
5.	"Samo mi je lepo"	2:58
6.	"Divna"	4:00
7.	"Čardak"	2:54
8.	"Cvet sa Istoka"	3:02
9.	"Belo"	2:53
10.	"Ela Ela"	2:18
11.	"Mila" (acoustic)	3:07
12.	"Mila" (instrumental)	2:55
Total length:		36:10

== Charts ==
Chart performance for "Mila"
Chart (2025)	Peak position
Croatian Domestic Albums (HDU)	2

== Release history ==
Release dates and formats for Mila
Region	Date	Format(s)	Label	Ref.
Various	2 May 2025	Digital download; streaming	PGP-RTS; Croatia Records	
