= Brate Murate =

Single by Familija

from the album Seljačka buna
- B-side: "Ringišpil"
- Released: 1996
- Recorded: 1996, PGP RTS Studio 5
- Genre: Ska; Pop rock
- Length: 2:57
- Label: Komuna
- Songwriter(s): Aleksandar Vasiljević, Dejan Petrović
- Producer(s): Aleksandar "Saša" Habić

Familija singles chronology
"Brate Murate" (1996)	"Mala, mala" (2000)

"Brate Murate" is a single by the Serbian rock supergroup Familija, released in 1996.

== Background ==
Having released the first album, the band recorded a CD single featuring two songs. "Brate Murate" later appeared on the band's second album Seljačka buna and the B-side, "Ringišpil", was taken from their previous album Narodno pozorište.

Since the band's drummers Ratko "Rale" Ljubičić and Goran "Gedža" Redžepi left the band, Marko Milivojević played the drums on "Brate Murate". The track was produced by Aleksandar "Saša" Habić at PGP RTS Studio 5.

== Track listing ==
1. "Ringišpil" (2:19) (Dejan Pejović)
2. "Brate Murate" (2:57) (Aleksandar Vasiljević, Dejan Petrović)

== Familija ==
- Aleksandar "Luka" Lukić (bass)
- Aleksandar "Vasa" Vasiljević (guitar, vocals)
- Dejan "Peja" Pejović (vocals)
- Dejan "Dexi" Petrović (vocals)
- Marko Milivojević (drums)
