= Serbia in the Eurovision Song Contest 2025 =

- Eurovision Song Contest 2025
- Participating broadcaster: Radio Television of Serbia (RTS)
- Country: Serbia
- Selection process: Pesma za Evroviziju '25
- Selection date: 28 February 2025

Competing entry
- Song: "Mila"
- Artist: Princ
- Songwriter: Dušan Bačić

Placement
- Semi-final result: Failed to qualify (14th)

Participation chronology

Serbia was represented at the Eurovision Song Contest 2025 with the song "Mila", written by Dušan Bačić and performed by Princ. The Serbian participating broadcaster, Radio Television of Serbia (RTS), organised the national final Pesma za Evroviziju '25 in order to select its entry for the contest.

Serbia was drawn to compete in the second semi-final of the Eurovision Song Contest, which took place on 15 May 2025. Performing during the show in position 15, "Mila" was not announced among the top 10 entries of the second semi-final and therefore did not qualify to compete in the final, marking the first time since 2017 that Serbia failed to qualify for the final. It was later revealed that Serbia placed fourteenth out of the 16 participating countries in the semi-final with 28 points, marking Serbia's worst result in the contest to date.

== Background ==
Prior to the 2025 contest, Radio Television of Serbia (RTS) had participated in the Eurovision Song Contest representing Serbia sixteen times since its first entry in 2007, winning the contest with its debut entry "Molitva" performed by Marija Šerifović. Since then, 12 out of the 15 total Serbian entries had featured in the final with RTS failing to qualify in 2009, 2013, and 2017. The Serbian entry in 2024, "Ramonda" performed by Teya Dora, qualified to the final and placed 17th.

As part of its duties as participating broadcaster, RTS organises the selection of its entry in the Eurovision Song Contest and broadcasts the event in the country. The broadcaster had used both internal selections and national finals to determine its entries throughout the years. Between 2007 and 2009, RTS used the Beovizija national final, but after its 2009 entry failed to qualify Serbia to the final, the broadcaster shifted its selection strategy to selecting specific composers to create songs for artists. After a successful internal selection in 2012, in 2013 RTS returned to an open national final format, titled Beosong, but it failed to qualify to the final. After reverting to internal selection in 2016 and 2017, it returned to use the Beovizija national final in 2018 and 2019, managing to qualify to the final on both occasions. In 2022, RTS returned to organising a national final under the name Pesma za Evroviziju, a format which was re-confirmed in both 2023 and 2024.

On 18 July 2024, RTS confirmed its participation in the 2025 contest, announcing the organisation of Pesma za Evroviziju for a fourth time in order to select its entry.

== Before Eurovision ==
=== Pesma za Evroviziju '25 ===
The fourth edition of Pesma za Evroviziju, the Serbian national final for the Eurovision Song Contest, took place between 25 and 28 February 2025 among 30 competing entries. The event was significantly impacted by the Serbian anti-corruption protests, with multiple presenters and guest performers withdrawing their planned appearances due to RTS' way of reporting on the protests.

==== Semi-finals ====
- The first semi-final took place on 25 February 2025. "Trendseter" performed by Iskaz, "Sve i odmah" performed by Kruz Roudi, "Brinem" performed by Ana & The Changes, "Šesto čulo" performed by Bojana and David, "Aladin" performed by Harem Girls, "Meet and Greet" performed by Filarri, "Da mi se vratiš" performed by Biber and "Storia del amor" performed by Milan Nikolić feat. Caka advanced to the final, while "Tebi treba neko kao ja" performed by Vampiri, "Kameleon" performed by Jelena Aleen, "Gaia" performed by Mila, "Ne mogu" performed by Igor Simić, "U grad" performed by Anton, "Up and Down" performed by Nataša Kojić and "AI" performed by Tropico Band were eliminated from the contest.
- The second semi-final took place on 26 February 2025. "Turbo žurka" performed by Mimi Mercedez, "Mila" performed by Princ, "Mama" performed by Oxajo, "Mask" performed by Vukayla, "Durum durum" performed by Tam, "Oči boje zemlje" performed by Sedlar, "Po policama sećanja" performed by Maršali and "Hvala ti" performed by Lensy advanced to the final, while "Boginja" performed by Dušan Kurtić, "La la la" performed by Ivana Štrbac, "Žali srce moje" performed by Maja Nikolić, "Ja sam bolja" performed by Tanja Banjanin, "Mamurna jutra" performed by AltCtrl, "Rolerkoster" performed by Džet Vega and "Do kraja vremena" performed by Gifts and Roses were eliminated from the contest.

==== Final ====
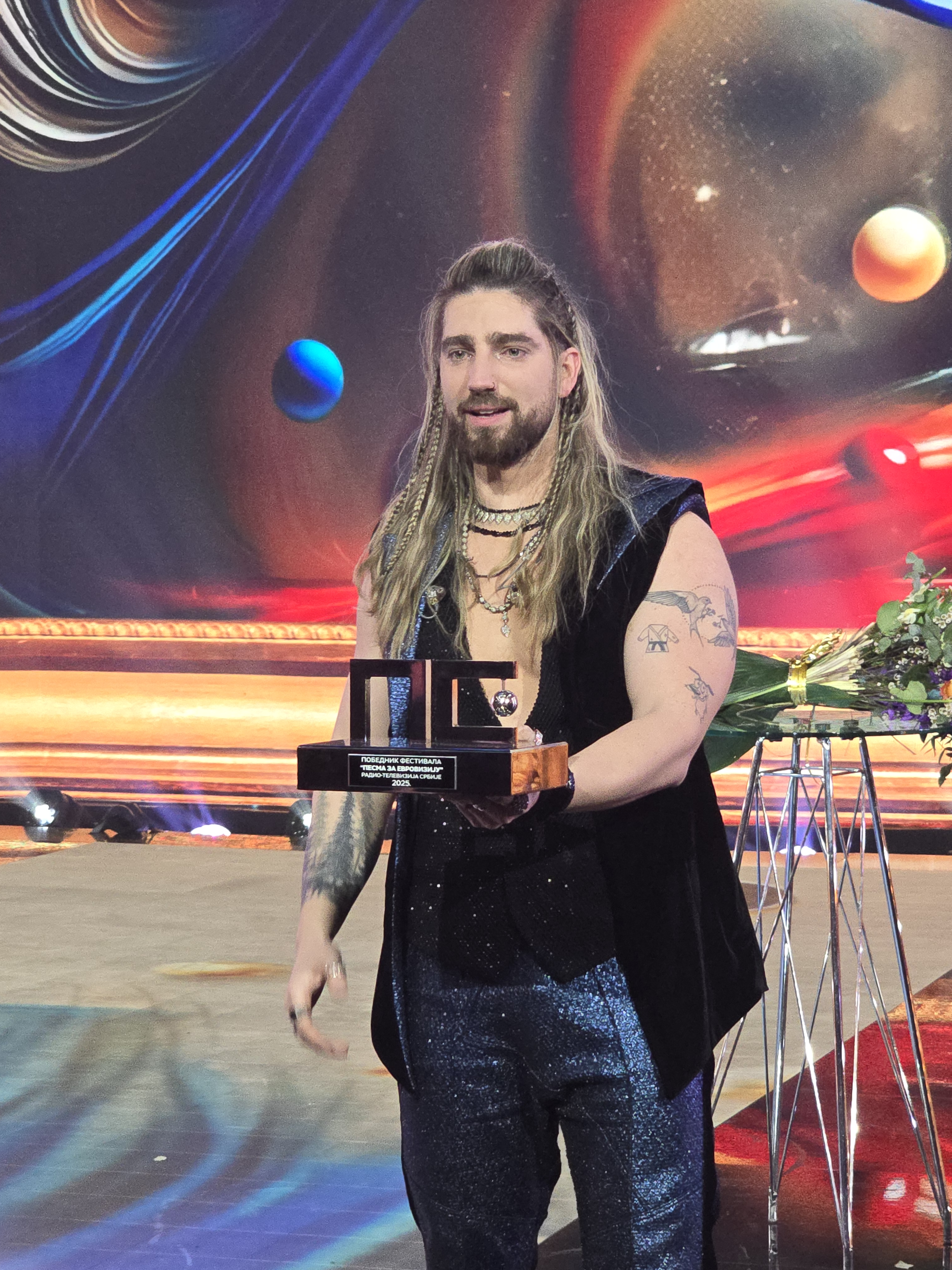
Princ, the winner of Pesma za Evroviziju '25, posing for the reporters following his win

The final took place on 28 February 2025. The winner was selected based on the 50/50 combination of votes from five jurors and from a public televote. The winner was "Mila", written by Dušan Bačić and performed by Princ.

Final – 28 February 2025
R/O	Artist	Song	Jury	Televote	Total	Place
1	Oxajo	"Mama"	4	6	10	7
2	Mimi Mercedez	"Turbo žurka"	5	7	12	5
3	Vukayla	"Mask"	12	4	16	3
4	Ana & The Changes	"Brinem"	3	0	3	10
5	Biber	"Da mi se vratiš"	1	0	1	14
6	Bojana and David	"Šesto čulo"	0	12	12	4
7	Maršali	"Po policama sećanja"	0	3	3	9
8	Princ	"Mila"	10	8	18	1
9	Sedlar	"Oči boje Zemlje"	8	0	8	8
10	Lensy	"Hvala ti"	2	0	2	12
11	Milan Nikolić feat. Caka	"Storia del amor"	0	0	0	16
12	Harem Girls	"Aladin"	7	10	17	2
13	Tam	"Durum durum"	6	5	11	6
14	Filarri	"Meet and Greet"	0	1	1	13
15	Iskaz	"Trendseter"	0	2	2	11
16	Kruz Roudi	"Sve i odmah"	0	0	0	15

== At Eurovision ==
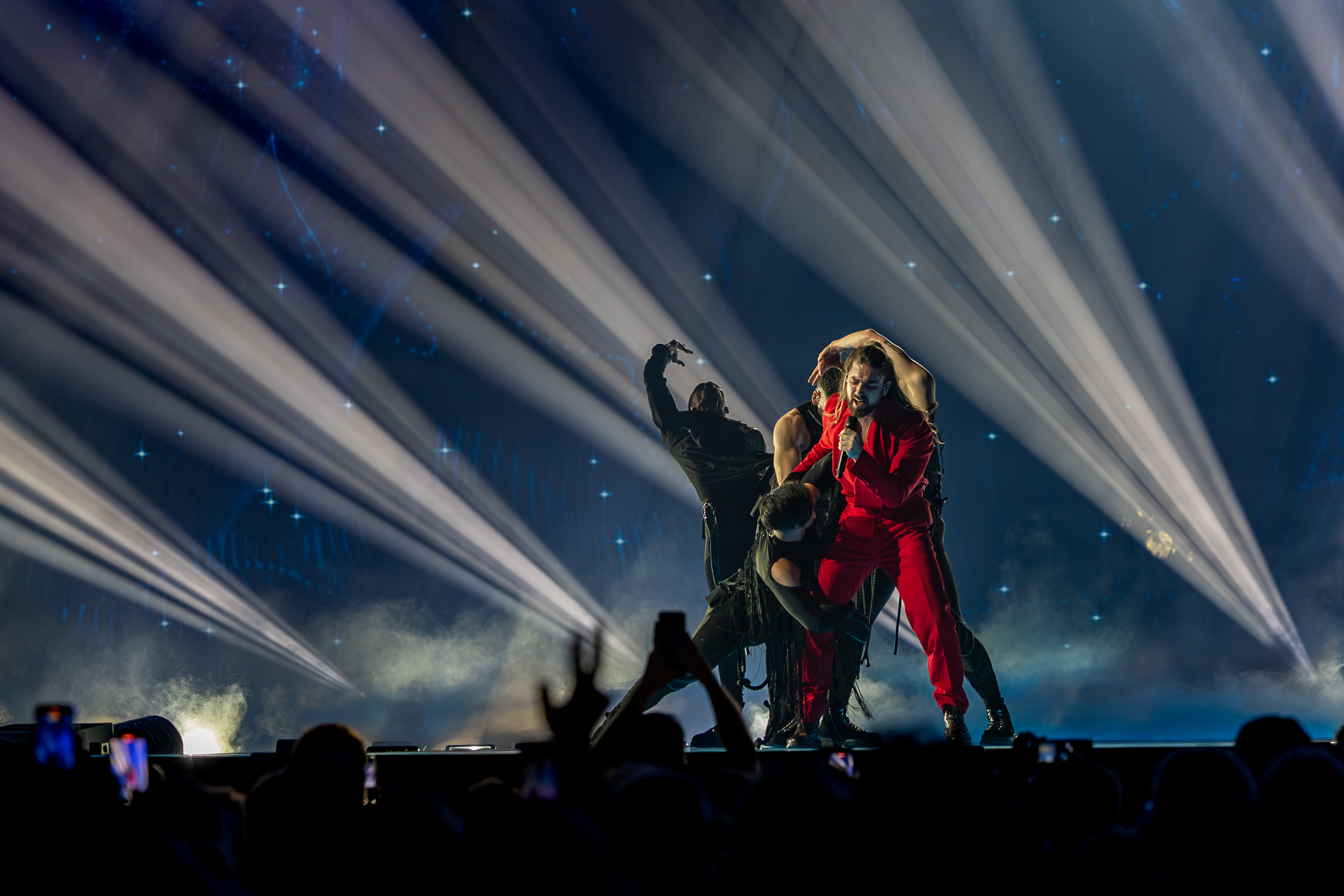
Princ during the second semi-final on 15 May 2025.

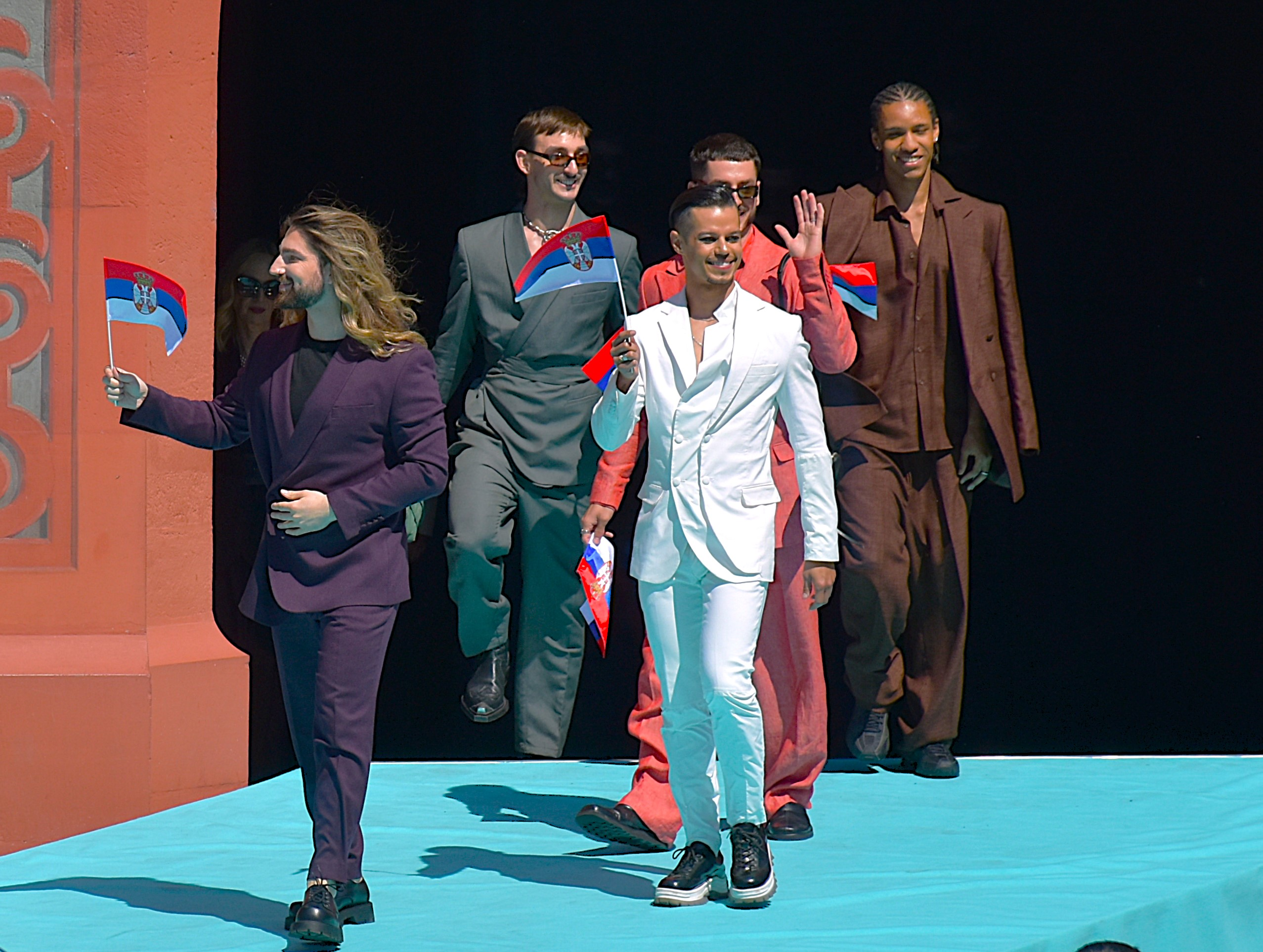
Princ and the Serbian delegation during the opening ceremony.

The Eurovision Song Contest 2025 took place at the St. Jakobshalle in Basel, Switzerland, and consisted of two semi-finals held on the respective dates of 13 and 15 May and the final on 17 May 2025. All nations with the exceptions of the host country and the "Big Five" (France, Germany, Italy, Spain and the United Kingdom) were required to qualify from one of two semi-finals in order to compete in the final; the top ten countries from each semi-final progressed to the final. On 28 January 2025, an allocation draw was held to determine which of the two semi-finals, as well as which half of the show, each country would perform in; the EBU split up the competing countries into different pots based on voting patterns from previous contests, with countries with favourable voting histories put into the same pot. Serbia was scheduled for the second half of the second semi-final. The shows' producers then decided the running order for the semi-finals; Serbia was set to perform in position 15.

In Serbia, RTS broadcast all shows on RTS 1 and RTS Svet with commentary by Duška Vučinić. The second semi-final, which Serbia competed in, was also broadcast on Radio Belgrade 1 with commentary by Nikoleta Dojčinović and Katarina Tošić.

=== Semi-final ===
Serbia performed in position 15, following the pre-qualified entry from Germany and before the entry from Finland. At the end of the show, the country was not announced as a qualifier for the final, marking the first time since 2017 that Serbia failed to qualify for the final. It was later revealed that Serbia placed fourteenth out of the sixteen participating countries in the second semi-final with 28 points, marking Serbia's worst result in the contest to date.

=== Voting ===
Below is a breakdown of points awarded by and to Serbia in the second semi-final and in the final. Voting during the three shows involved each country awarding sets of points from 1-8, 10 and 12: one from their professional jury and the other from televoting in the final vote, while the semi-final vote was based entirely on the vote of the public. The Serbian jury consisted of Aleksandar Habić, Luka Jovanović, Bojana Stamenov, who represented Serbia in 2015, Ivana Peters and Olga Biserčić. In the second semi-final, Serbia placed 14th with 28 points, including maximum twelve points from Montenegro. Over the course of the contest, Serbia awarded its 12 points to Montenegro in the second semi-final, and to France (jury) and Estonia (televote) in the final.

RTS appointed Dragana Kosjerina as its spokesperson to announce the Serbian jury's votes in the final.

==== Points awarded to Serbia ====
Points awarded to Serbia (Semi-final 2)
Points	Televote
12 points	Montenegro
10 points	Austria
8 points	
7 points	
6 points	
5 points	
4 points	France
3 points	
2 points	
1 point	Germany; Greece

==== Points awarded by Serbia ====
Points awarded by Serbia (Semi-final 2)
Points	Televote
12 points	Montenegro
10 points	Greece
8 points	Finland
7 points	Israel
6 points	Austria
5 points	Lithuania
4 points	Latvia
3 points	Luxembourg
2 points	Malta
1 point	Armenia

Points awarded by Serbia (Final)
Points	Televote	Jury
12 points	Estonia	France
10 points	Austria	Germany
8 points	Greece	Austria
7 points	Sweden	Switzerland
6 points	Finland	Greece
5 points	Germany	Denmark
4 points	Albania	Ukraine
3 points	Norway	Estonia
2 points	Israel	Armenia
1 point	Malta	Latvia

==== Detailed voting results ====
The following members comprised the Serbian jury:

- Aleksandar Habić
- Luka Jovanović (Luxonee)
- Bojana Stamenov (represented Serbia in the Eurovision Song Contest 2015)
- Ivana Peters
- Olga Biserčić

Detailed voting results from Serbia (Semi-final 2)
R/O	Country	Televote	
R/O	Country	Rank	Points
01	Australia	13	
02	Montenegro	1	12
03	Ireland	11	
04	Latvia	7	4
05	Armenia	10	1
06	Austria	5	6
07	Greece	2	10
08	Lithuania	6	5
09	Malta	9	2
10	Georgia	15	
11	Denmark	14	
12	Czechia	12	
13	Luxembourg	8	3
14	Israel	4	7
15	Serbia		
16	Finland	3	8

Detailed voting by Serbia (final)
R/O	Country	Jury							Televote	
R/O	Country	Juror 1	Juror 2	Juror 3	Juror 4	Juror 5	Rank	Points	Rank	Points
01	Norway	18	26	22	25	15	22		8	3
02	Luxembourg	23	12	11	16	13	14		20	
03	Estonia	8	18	5	6	12	8	3	1	12
04	Israel	17	11	7	13	7	11		9	2
05	Lithuania	26	21	26	20	26	25		14	
06	Spain	16	9	13	9	25	12		18	
07	Ukraine	5	7	9	10	10	7	4	21	
08	United Kingdom	14	10	15	19	19	15		24	
09	Austria	4	4	3	5	2	3	8	2	10
10	Iceland	24	25	23	26	24	26		15	
11	Latvia	10	13	14	8	4	10	1	17	
12	Netherlands	15	15	21	12	14	16		12	
13	Finland	22	17	17	21	17	21		5	6
14	Italy	7	14	16	18	16	13		11	
15	Poland	25	16	20	24	22	23		16	
16	Germany	2	2	1	2	6	2	10	6	5
17	Greece	13	8	4	3	3	5	6	3	8
18	Armenia	9	6	8	11	9	9	2	19	
19	Switzerland	3	3	10	7	5	4	7	22	
20	Malta	19	20	25	14	11	18		10	1
21	Portugal	12	22	19	15	21	19		26	
22	Denmark	6	5	6	4	8	6	5	25	
23	Sweden	11	19	18	17	18	17		4	7
24	France	1	1	2	1	1	1	12	13	
25	San Marino	20	23	12	23	23	20		23	
26	Albania	21	24	24	22	20	24		7	4

=== Ratings ===
In Serbia, an average of 303,000 people watched the final of the contest, constituting a 15% audience share, and rating of below 5.2%. This was the lowest number of viewers for a grand final in Serbia since 2013. Princ's semi-final also recorded the lowest rating for a semi-final with a representative of Serbia since 2013.
