= Familija =

Rock Supergroup from Serbia

Background information
- Origin: Belgrade, Serbia, FR Yugoslavia
- Genres: Ska, pop rock, rock, world music
- Years active: 1994 – 1998
- Labels: PGP-RTS, Komuna Belgrade, Taped Pictures
- Past members: Aleksandar Vasiljević; Aleksandar Lukić; Dejan Pejović; Dejan Petrović; Goran Redžepi; Ratko Ljubičić; Marko Milivojević; Branko Popović

Familija (Serbian Cyrillic: Фамилија; trans. Family) was a Serbian rock supergroup from Belgrade, consisting of Vampiri, Košava and U Škripcu members. The band's musical style was a combination of ska, pop, ethnic and rock music.

== History ==
The band was founded in late 1993 by U Škripcu members Aleksandar "Vasa" Vasiljević (guitar), Aleksandar "Luka" Lukić (bass) and Ratko Ljubičić (drums) along with former Vampiri members Dejan "Peja" Pejović (vocals), Dejan "Dexy" Petrović (vocals) and drummer/percussionist Goran "Gedža" Redžepi.

In February 1994 the band began recording their debut album, Narodno pozorište (National Theatre), released by PGP-RTS later during the year. Pejović, Vasiljević, Lukić and Petrović wrote all the songs, featuring various musical styles combined with pop rock sound. The album featured the hits "Baltazar" (whose chorus referred to Professor Balthazar theme song), "Mala, mala", "Što ja volim taj seks" and "Nije mi ništa". The track "Trajna Nina" featured lyrics from the Beatles track "Yellow Submarine". The record was produced by Đorđe Petrović who also played keyboards. Vinyl LP and compact cassette editions sleeves were designed by Saša "Madoženja" Marković, while the CD edition featured sleeve art by Branko Lukić. The band also appeared in Srđan Dragojević's movie Dva sata kvalitetnog TV programa as one of the performers at the New Year's Eve party.

Ratko Ljubučić and Goran Redžepi left the band in late 1995 and early 1996 respectively and the band kept hiring various drummers for their future recording sessions and live performances. During mid-1996 the band released a CD single featuring two songs, "Ringišpil" (taken from the album Narodno pozorište) and "Brate Murate", a newly recorded song featuring Marko Milivojević on drums and produced by Saša Habić. The single was released through Komuna Belgrade.

The band's second album Seljačka buna (Peasant Revolt) was released in May 1997. Apart from the track "Brate Murate" (also included in the track list), the rest of the album was again produced by Đorđe Petrović in the band's signature eclectic style, featuring additional hits "Paranoja" and "Boli me kita". Petar "Zver" Radmilović played the drum tracks in the studio, while the following live performances were played with Branko Popović on drums.

The band broke up in early 1998. In 2000, Slovenian record label Taped Pictures released a various artists compilation featuring the band's song "Mala, mala".

== Post breakup ==
Dejan Petrović formed the band Centrala with his brother Nenad (Mušterije member). The band's style was a combination of electronic music and rock. The band is currently on hiatus.

Pejović formed The Dibidus in 2003 with former Hush bass guitarist Milan Sarić and former Deca Loših Muzičara guitarist Jova Jović. In their live performances, The Dibidus also performed songs of Familija, and their 2013 live album Uživo iz kluba "Fest" (Live from the Club Fest) featured five songs originally recorded by Familija.

In 2006, Vasiljević and Lukić rejoined the rest of the original U Škripcu members at the Delča & Sklekovi concert held at Dom Omladine in Belgrade. In 2009, Lukić formed a Manu Chao and The Clash influenced band Radio Gerila.

== Legacy ==
In 2021 the album Narodno pozorište was polled 99th on the list of 100 best Serbian rock albums published after the breakup of SFR Yugoslavia. The list was published in the book Kako (ni)je propao rokenrol u Srbiji (How Rock 'n' Roll in Serbia (Didn't) Came to an End).

In 2011 "Što ja volim taj seks" was polled, by the listeners of Radio 202, one of 60 greatest songs released by PGP-RTB/PGP-RTS during the sixty years of the label's existence.

== Discography ==
=== Studio albums ===
Title	Released
Narodno pozorište	1994
Seljačka buna	1997

=== Singles ===
Title	Released
"Brate Murate"	1996
"Mala, mala"	2000
