= Laki Pingvini =

Serbian rock band

- The reunited Laki Pingvini in 2006

Background information
- Origin: Belgrade, Serbia
- Genres: New wave; synth-pop; pop rock
- Years active: 1979–1986; 1995; (Reunions: 1994, 2006)
- Labels: PGP-RTB, PGP-RTS
- Past members: Đorđe Dragojlović; Časlav Stanković; Srđan Đurić; Aleksandar Rodić; Milan Bubalo; Dragutin Jakovljević; Rade Bulatović; Ivan Aleksijević; Zoran Obradović

Laki Pingvini (Serbian Cyrillic: Лаки Пингвини; transl. The Easy Penguins) were a Serbian and Yugoslav rock band formed in Belgrade in 1979. Initially a part of the Yugoslav new wave scene, the band later turned towards synth-pop and pop rock sound. They released two studio albums and had several hit songs before disbanding in 1986. The band's vocalist Đorđe Dragojlović reformed Laki Pingivni in 1995, the band releasing their third studio album and disbanding shortly after. The band's last activity was in 2006, when the default lineup reunited for two live performances.

== History ==
=== Formation, prominence, breakup (1979-1989) ===
The band was formed in 1979 and had their first public appearance on November 29 (celebrated in SFR Yugoslavia as the Republic Day), at a punk costume party held at the Pinki club in Zemun. At the time, the band had four vocalists and no regular lineup, but as time passed, a steady lineup was formed featuring Đorđe Dragojlović (vocals), Časlav Stanković (guitar), Srđan Đurić (bass guitar), Aleksandar Rodić (keyboards, formerly of the bands Kako and Piloti) and Milan Bubalo (drums, formerly of Beograd).

The band started working more consistently in September 1982, and in the following summer released their debut release, the EP, Šizika (Crazy Girl). The EP, beside the title track, featured two more tracks, "Devojka iz svemira" ("A Girl from Outer Space") and "Možda, možda" ("Maybe, Maybe"), and was produced by Saša Habić. The title track and "Možda, možda" would become the band's first hits. A demo version of the song "Možda, možda" also appeared on the prominent Ventilator 202 Demo Top 10 compilation.

In 1984, the band released their debut album, Muzika za mlade (Music for the Young Ones), produced by Slobodan Marković. The album brought the hits "Ne, nisam tvoj heroj" ("No, I'm Not Your Hero"), which was a cover of John Paul Young's song "Yesterday's Hero", and "Moja devojka" ("My Girlfriend"). The track "Baby" featured sampled accordion and car engine sounds, and the whole album featured an analog drum machine. Having released the album, the band performed at the Split Music Festival with the song "Ja sam mornar" ("I'm a Sailor") and a cover version of Paul Anka's "Love Me Warm and Tender", with lyrics in Serbo-Croatian and entitled "Voli me" ("Love Me"), which appeared on the festival's official album Split '84.

The following album, Striptiz (Striptease), was released in 1985. It featured the song "Čarobnjaci" ("Wizzards"), composed by Zoran Simjanović and featuring lyrics written by writer Milan Oklopčić, originally recorded for the TV series Ne tako davno (Not So Long Ago). The album brought the hit "Blago morskih dubina" ("Treasure of the Sea-Depths"), but the public did not show much interest for the rest of the album. "Blago morskih dubina" also appeared as the B-side of the "Cry, Baby, Cry" single, released during the same year. After the album release, the band ended their activity, and vocalist Đorđe Dragojlović started a short-lasting solo career under the alias Super Đoka. He appeared at the MESAM festival in 1986 with the song "Pokreni me" ("Start Me Up"), the song appearing on the festival album MESAM – Pop Festival 86.. In 1988, he took part in the recording of the TV rock operette Kreatori i kreature (Creators and Creatures). The operette was composed by Vladimir Milačić, directed by Milutin Petrović and featured, beside Dragojlović, Massimo Savić, Dejan Cukić, Snežana Jandrlić, Bora Đorđević, Goran Čavajda "Čavke", Zana Nimani, and Amila Sulejmanović.

=== 1994 reunion, 1995 reformation and 2006 reunion ===
In January 1994, the band reunited to perform at the unplugged festival at Sava Centar in Belgrade, and the acoustic version of "Šizika", recorded at the festival, was released on the various artists live album Bez struje (Unlugged).

The following year, Dragojlović reformed the band in a new lineup, featuring Galija guitarist Dragutin Jakovljević, bass guitarist Rade Bulatović, keyboardist Ivan Aleksijević and former Piloti drummer Zoran Obradović "Ćera". The new incarnation of the band released the comeback album Stereo. The album featured newly recorded versions of "Blago morskih dubina", "Kraj" ("The End") and "Pokreni me". The album also featured cover versions of Herbie Hancock's "Cantaloupe Island", entitled "Šta bi dao bre" ("What Would I Give, Bre"), Brian Eno and John Cale's "Empty Frame", entitled "Dragan, Marko i Violeta" ("Dragan, Marko and Violeta") and Pro Arte's "Lola". The album was produced by the band themselves. After the album release, the band split up once again. During 1995, Dragojlović appeared as guest on the cover version of "Šizika", recorded by the pop rock band Ruž on their album Kao nekada... (Like It Used to Be...).

On 10 March 2006, the band's original lineup reunited to perform as guests at a Delča i Sklekovi concert, held in the Belgrade Youth Center on 10 March. On 17 October of the same year, the band had their last appearance, performing as the opening act on Duran Duran concert at Belgrade Fair.

=== Post 2006 ===
Časlav Stanković died on 2 October 2012. Milan Bubalo died on 7 December 2023.

== Legacy ==
In 1995, Serbian and Yugoslav pop rock band Ruž covered the song "Šizika" on their album Kao nekada..., with Dragojlović making a guest appearance on the song. In 2011, at the Belgrade Mixer festival, the Serbian post-rock band Petrol performed the album Muzika za mlade in its entirety. In 2014, Serbian jazz band Bata Božanić Kvintet covered the song "Možda, možda" on their album Uspomene 2 (Memories 2), with Dragojlović making a guest appearance on the song.

In 1998, the various artists compilation Ventilator 202 Demo Top 10, featuring the demo version of the band's song "Možda, možda", appeared on the 100th place on the 100 Greatest Yugoslav Popular Music Albums list, released in the book YU 100: najbolji albumi jugoslovenske rok i pop muzike (YU 100: The Best albums of Yugoslav pop and rock music).

In 2006, the song "Šizika" was polled No.56 on the B92 Top 100 Yugoslav songs list. In 2011, "Šizika" was polled by the listeners of Radio 202 as one of 60 greatest songs released by PGP-RTB/PGP-RTS during the sixty years of the label's existence.

== Discography ==
=== Studio albums ===
- Muzika za mlade (1984)
- Striptiz (1985)
- Stereo (1995)

=== EPs ===
- Šizika (1983)

=== Singles ===
"Cry, Baby, Cry" / "Blago morskih dubina" (1985)

=== Other appearances ===
- "Možda, možda" (Ventilator 202 Demo Top 10, 1983)
- "Ja sam mornar" / "Voli me" (Split '84)
- "Šizika" (Bez struje, 1994)

== See also ==
- New wave music in Yugoslavia
