= Seljačka buna =

Studio album by Familija
- Released: May 1997
- Genre: Ska; Pop rock
- Length: 33:46
- Label: Komuna
- Producer: Đorđe Petrović

Familija chronology
Narodno pozorište (1995)	Seljačka buna (1997)

Seljačka buna is the second and the last album by the Serbian rock supergroup Familija, released in 1997.

== Background ==
The band's second album featured the same style the band had on their debut. The album, like the previous one, was produced by Đorđe Petrović, and featured fourteen songs, including "Brate Murate" which was previously released on single and produced by Aleksandar "Saša" Habić. The album was recorded at the Music Factory studio, except for track five, which was recorded at the PGP RTS studio 5.

The drummer Ratko "Rale" Ljubičić did not appear on the album as he previously left the band and was firstly replaced by Marko Milivojević, and then by Petar "Pera Zver" Radmilović.

== Track listing ==
1. "Tehnička proba" (1:48) (Familija)
2. "Svadba" (0:47) (Aleksandar Vasiljević)
3. "Hepi hipi" (3:22) (Aleksandar Vasiljević, Dejan Petrović)
4. "Niko nije kriv" (4:05) (Dejan Pejović)
5. "Brate Murate" (3:07) (Aleksandar Vasiljević, Dejan Petrović)
6. "Boli me kita" (3:19) (Aleksandar Vasiljević, Dejan Pejović)
7. "Paranoja" (4:09) (Aleksandar Vasiljević, Dejan Pejović)
8. "Pa, pa, paranoja" (4:10) (Aleksandar Vasiljević, Dejan Pejović)
9. "Mali zmaj" (1:48) (Aleksandar Vasiljević, Dejan Pejović)
10. "Niš, Pariz, Teksas" (2:58) (Aleksandar Vasiljević, Dejan Pejović)
11. "Mamlaze!" (3:14) (Aleksandar Vasiljević, Dejan Pejović, Dejan Petrović)
12. "Jin i Jang" (1:54) (Familija)
13. "Tumbrlakatukaćaka" (3:29) (Aleksandar Vasiljević, Dejan Petrović)
14. "Više nikada" (3:12) (Aleksandar Lukić, Aleksandar Vasiljević)

== Familija ==
- Aleksandar "Luka" Lukić (bass)
- Aleksandar "Vasa" Vasiljević (guitar, vocals)
- Dejan "Peja" Pejović (vocals, tambourine)
- Dejan "Dexi" Petrović (vocals)

=== Additional personnel ===
- Petar "Pera Zver" Radmilović (drums)
- Marko Milivojević (drums on track 5) (uncredited on the album)
