= U škripcu =

Serbian and Yugoslav rock band from Belgrade

- U škripcu forming members in 1983, from left to right: Milan Delčić, Zoran Vulović and Aleksandar Vasiljević

Background information
- Origin: Belgrade, SR Serbia, SFR Yugoslavia
- Genres: New wave; art rock; post-punk; synth-pop; pop rock; power pop
- Years active: 1980–1985; 1986–1987; 1989–1991; (Reunions: 2006)
- Labels: Jugoton, PGP-RTB, Jugodisk, Taped Pictures, Automatik, Croatia Records
- Past members: Milan Delčić; Aleksandar Vasiljević; Zoran Vulović; Miloš Obrenović; Aleksandar Lukić; Zdravko Jurković; Dario Kumerle; Davor Vidiš; Aleksandar Tabaš; Zoran Veljković; Dejan Škopelja; Marko Milivojević

U škripcu (Serbian Cyrillic: У шкрипцу; trans. In Dire Straits) was a Yugoslav rock band formed in Belgrade in 1980.

The band was formed in 1980 by Milan Delčić "Delča" (vocals), Aleksandar Vasiljević "Vasa" (guitar) and Zoran Vulović "Vule" (keyboards), the lineup soon being expanded with Aleksandar Lukić (bass guitar) and Miloš Obrenović (drums). At the time of their formation, the band was a part of the Yugoslav new wave scene, attracting the attention of the public with their artistic live performances and appearing on the seminal 1981 various artists compilation album Artistička radna akcija. With the debut album release, the 1982 Godine ljubavi, the band moved towards a more experimental post-punk sound, before achieving nationwide commercial success with the release of the 1983 album O je! and mini album Nove godine!, heavily influenced by New Romanticism. The original lineup recorded one more album, the synth-pop-oriented Budimo zajedno, which failed to repeat the commercial success of its predecessors, causing the band to disband in 1985.

In 1986, Vulović and Delčić reformed the band, but the latter soon left, so the new lineup, featuring the vocalist Aleksandar Tabaš, recorded the fourth studio album, power pop-influenced U škripcu. The album was not commercially successful, causing the band to disband in 1988. The following year, Vulović reunited with Delčić and Vasiljević, Lukić on guitar, bassist Dejan Škopelja, and drummer Ratko Ljubičić. The lineup recorded the critically acclaimed fifth studio album Izgleda da mi smo sami, after which the band, although not officially announcing their disbandment, ended their activity with the outbreak of Yugoslav Wars. During the following years, they would reunite for major events only, like their performance at the 1996–1997 protests. Following the dibandment, Vulović became a producer and manager, Delčić pursued a solo career with his band Sklekovi, and Vasiljević and Lukić became a part of the supergroup Familija.

In 2006, the original lineup reunited at a Delča i Sklekovi concert, the recording of which was released on the 2008 live album Jubilarnih 20 i nešto godina, under the moniker Delča a i U škripcu (Delča and also U škripcu).

== History ==
=== Original lineup years (1980–1985) ===
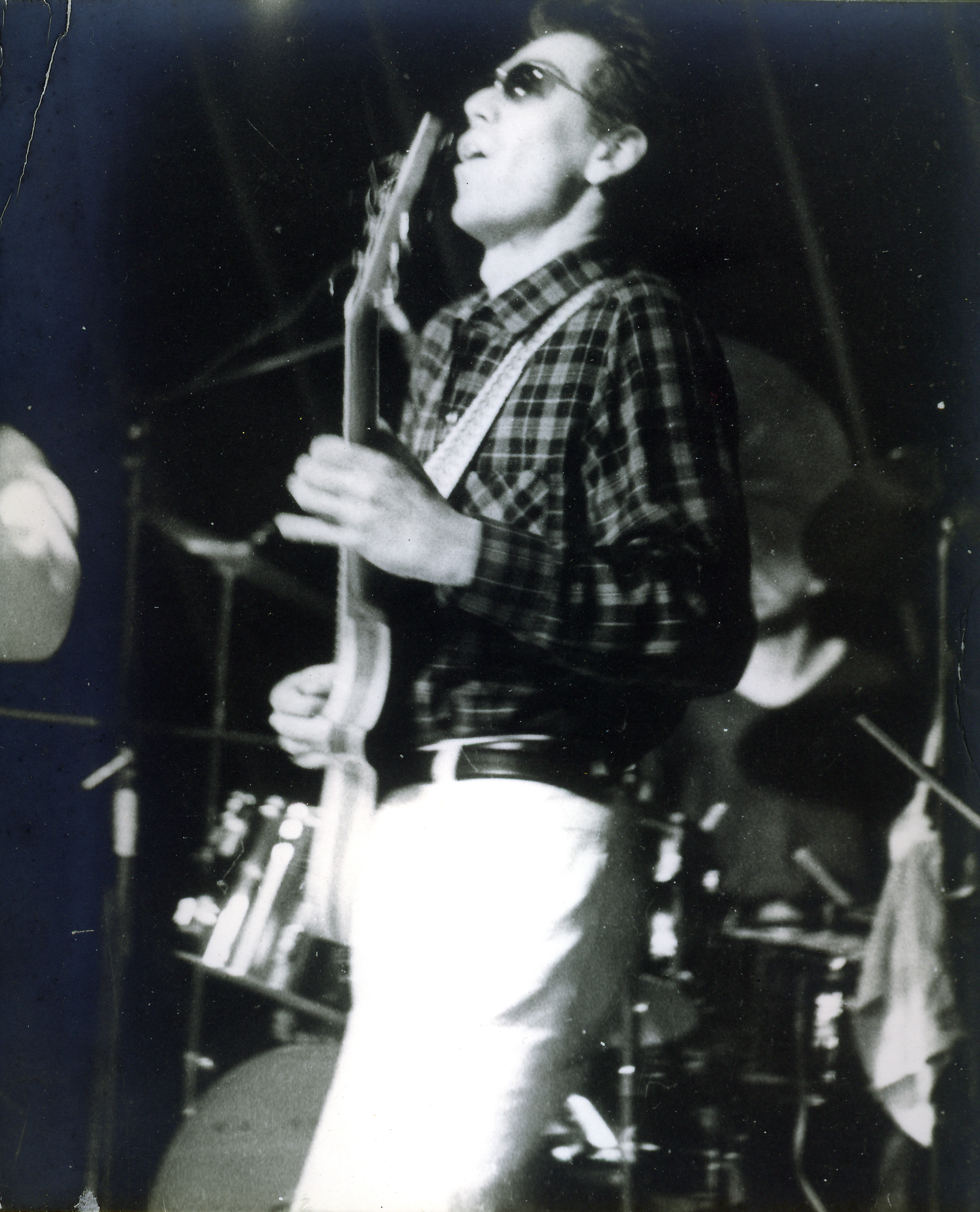
Aleksandar Vasiljević performing with U Škripcu in the early 1980s

The band was formed by three high school friends, Milan Delčić "Delča" (vocals, guitar for a short period of time), Aleksandar Vasiljević "Vasa" (guitar) and Zoran Vulović "Vule" (keyboards). The three used to write amateur theatre plays and in 1979 decided to form a band. The group was initially called Prolog za veliki haos (Prologue for the Great Chaos), and then Furije furiozno furaju (The Furies Racing Furiously). The three also worked as associate journalists for the Studio B radio station show Mladi novi svet (Young New World), later renamed to Ritam srca (Rhythm of the Heart). Delčić chose the name for the show, his voice appearing in the show's opening theme.

In 1980, the band was renamed U škripcu (In Dire Straits)—choosing this name as they had frequent problems with equipment and lack of money—adding drummer Miloš Obrenović, and soon after bass guitarist Aleksandar Lukić "Luka" to the lineup. The band's first recordings, tracks "Južno voće" ("Tropical Fruit") and "Pamflex dom" ("Pamflex Home"), were released in 1981 on the Artistička radna akcija (Artistic Work Action) compilation, which featured the second generation of Belgrade new wave bands. At the beginning of their career the band developed the "Pamflex" concept. Pamflex was an imaginary company, invented by Delčić, with the band's songs representing commercials for the company's imaginary products. The band described advertising as the finest form of art and introduced elements of theatre into their live performances, with reading ironic and comical speeches, playing accordion and using Pamflex flags. During 1981, the band had numerous live appearances in Belgrade and Zagreb clubs, and soon established a loyal fanbase.

Their debut album, Godine ljubavi (Years of Love), was released by PGP-RTB in 1982. The album did not feature Lukić on bass guitar, as he was at the time of the recording serving his mandatory stint in the Yugoslav People's Army. The bass on the recording was played by Idoli bassist Zdenko Kolar, and during the promotional tour, bass guitar was played by Dejan Grujić, formerly of the band Braća (The Brothers). On Godine ljubavi the band established a team of co-workers who collaborated on their next releases, producer Saša Habić and album artwork design group Aux Maniere, consisting of Slobodan Šajin and Momčilo Rajin. The band dealt with diverse themes in tracks like "Ti imaš dosta godina" ("You Have Plenty of Years"), "Hamuamule", "Samuraj" ("Samurai"), "Kao u boji" ("Like in Color") and "Proleće" ("Spring").

In 1983, the band signed a contract with Jugoton and released the album O je! (Oh, Yeah!) and the mini album Nove godine! (New Years!). The album was well-accepted by the audience and the music critics, and the music magazine Rock pronounced O je! the Best Release of 1983. As Lukić was still in the army, bass guitar on the recording was played by Slobodan Svrdlan, member of the heavy metal band Gordi, who also did part of the arrangements, while Đorđe Petrović (keyboards), Nenad Jelić (percussion) and Jovan Maljoković (saxophone) appeared on the album as guests. The tracks "Beograd spava" ("Belgrade Is Sleeping"), "Kockar" ("Gambler") and "Siđi do reke" ("Come Down to the River") saw large airplay. The mini album Nove godine!, with cover designed by artist Mirko Ilić, was intentionally released during the New Year holidays, with the title track and "Koliko imaš godina" ("How Old Are You") becoming nationwide hits.

In 1984, Lukić returned to the band and together they held a large number of concerts, mainly in SR Croatia. In 1985, the band released the album Budimo zajedno! (Let's Be Together!), which featured a combination of pop and electronic music. It featured a new version of "Hamuamule", and the songs "Tama me prati" ("Darkness Follows Me"), "Crni anđele" ("Black Angel"), "Baj, baj" ("Bye, Bye") which saw modest airplay. Due to the inability to achieve the success of the previous records, the band ceased to exist.

=== Reformation with new lineup (1986–1987) ===
After the band split up, Delčić finished his studies of dramaturgy at the Belgrade Faculty of Dramatic Arts and dedicated himslelf to writing theatre plays. Vasić and Lukić worked as producers and with Obrenović and keyboardist Aleksandar Ralev formed the pop rock band Košava, which released only the album Crveno vino (Red Wine) in 1986 before disbanding, and with only the song "Daj mi snagu košave" ("Give Me the Strength of Košava") becoming a minor hit. Part of the album lyrics were written by Delčić and Vida Crnčević.

Vulović, having returned from the Yugoslav People's Army, decided to form his own band, Bang Bang, featuring himself on vocals. However, Delčić became a part of the project, and the two in 1986 decided to reform U Škripcu. They recorded new material with musicians from Zagreb, guitarist Zdravko Jurković, bassist Dario Kumerle and drummer Davor Vidiš, the latter a former member of the band Kristalno plavo (Crystal Blue). However, Delčić had to leave the band to serve his stint in the Yugoslav army, so Vulović decided to change the lineup with musicians from Belgrade, vocalist Aleksandar Tabaš, a former member of the band Rolly, guitarist Zoran Veljković, bassist Dejan Škopelja "Škopi", formerly of the bands Kanibal fru fru (Canibal Frou Frou) and Belo belo (White White), and drummer Marko Milivojević, formerly of Morbidi i mnoći. This lineup released the 1987 self-titled album, featuring part of the songs recorded by the band's previous lineup. The album was produced by Rijan Nemurin and featured guest appearances by Aleksandar Vasiljević and Tunel guitarist Vlada Negovanović. The album, featuring harder, power pop sound, was not commercially successful, with only the tracks "Vreme je za nas ("It Is Time for Us") and "Ne brini" ("Don't Worry") becoming minor hits, and the group disbanded. Aleksandar Tabaš moved back to his home city of Titograd, becoming the vocalist for the band Zona X (Zone X) and acting in several amateur theatres. During the 1990s, he appeared on several pop festivals, winning the 2000 Music Festival Budva with the song "Sivi soko" ("Grey Falcon").

=== Original members reunion (1989–1991) ===
Delčić, having returned from the army, started preparing his first solo album. The album should have featured pop-oriented sound and been produced by former Hobo leader Mato Došen. However, he gave up on the album as U Škripcu reunited once again, featuring forming members Delčić, Vasiljević and Vulović, Aleksandar Lukić, Dejan Škopelja and Disciplina Kičme drummer Ratko Ljubičić. During the same year, Lukić had a minor role in the film The Fall of Rock & Roll. The band released Izgleda da mi smo sami (It Looks like We're Alone) in 1990. The album was produced by Lukić and Vasiljević, and the title track and "Ako ti kažem (Je, je, je)" ("If I Say to You (Yeah, Yeah, Yeah)") became hits. On the retrospective evening of the Belgrade Spring Festival, the band performed a cover version of "Stjuardesa" ("Stewardess"), originally performed by singer Đorđe Marjanović, and the recording appeared on the festival compilation album Beograde ((Oh,) Belgrade) in 1991.

When the Yugoslav Wars started, the band became inactive and reunited only for major events, like performances on student's protests and Gitarijada festival, and in the meantime prepared some new material, which was never released.

=== Post-breakup and 2006 reunion ===
After U škripcu ended their activity, Delčić dedicated himself to his solo career with his backing band Sklekovi (The Push-Ups), Vasiljević and Lukić formed the band Familija with former Vampiri members Dejan "Peja" Pejović, Dejan "Dexi" Petrović and Goran "Gedža" Redžepi, and Vulović became a music manager. Part of the material prepared for the never-released seventh studio album by U škripcu appeared on Delčić's first solo album Delča i Sklekovi and on the Familija debut album Narodno pozorište (People's Theatre). After Familija disbanded, Lukić recorded some of his songs under the names Radio gerila (Radio Guerrilla) and Meksikanac s Kosmaja (Mexican from Kosmaj), and Vulović started a successful concert agency Long Play.

In 2002, Taped Pictures record label released O je! and Nove godine! on single disc.

In 2006, on the Delča & Sklekovi concert at Belgrade Youth Center, the original U škripcu members, Vasiljević, Vulović, Lukić and Obrenović, as well as Škopelja, appeared as guests. In December 2008, a live album entitled Jubilarnih 20 i nešto godina (20-Something Anniversary), recorded at the performance, was released under the moniker Delča a i U škripcu (Delča, but also U škripcu). Delčić stated that the release is not a comeback album or the announcement of the band's reunion.

Delčić died on 24 July 2011, after spending several years fighting leukemia.

In 2019, Croatia Records released the compilation album Greatest Hits Collection, Vulović, Vasiljević, Lukić, Obrenović, Škopelja and Ljubičić all appearing on the album promotion in Belgrade.

== Legacy ==
In September 2013, a commemorative plaque in memory of Delčić was unveiled in Mila Jevtović Street in Belgrade, on the house in which he lived.

In 2011, Serbian alternative rock band Block Out released two versions of U škripcu song "Beograd spava" as a single. In 2012, Croatian singer Massimo Savić covered the song "Siđi do reke", as a tribute to Delčić, on his concert at Belgrade's Sava Centar. In 2012, Serbian band Vampiri covered the song "Koliko imaš godina" on their concert in Sava centar as a tribute to Delčić. In 2014, Croatian singer-songwriter Damir Urban covered the band's song "Ne brini" ("Don't Worry"), for Nikola Vukčević's film The Kids from the Marx and Engels Street. In 2017, singer of spiritual music Divna Ljubojević covered the song "Siđi do reke", releasing it as a single. In 2020, Serbian punk rock band NBG covered the song "Nove godine" on their 2020 album Nama ostaje samo punk (We've Only Got Punk Left). In 2021, Serbian jazz duo Lidija Andonov & Andy Pavlov recorded a cover of the song "Siđi do reke" on their album Mlad & Radostan - Homage to Yugoslav Music from the 80s and Beyond (Young & Joyful - Homage to Yugoslav Music from the 80s and Beyond). In 2023, "Siđi do reke" was covered by Croatian band Fit under the title "Siđi do Rijeke" (a word play meaning both "Come Down to the River" and "Come Down to Rijeka") and released as a single.

In 2006, the song "Siđi do reke" was ranked No. 71 on the B92 Top 100 Domestic Songs list. In 2011, the song "Izgleda da mi smo sami" was polled, by the listeners of Radio 202, one of 60 greatest songs released by PGP-RTB/PGP-RTS during the sixty years of the label's existence.

The lyrics of the songs "Proleće" and "Šuma" ("Forest") were featured in Petar Janjatović's book Pesme bratstva, detinjstva & potomstva: Antologija ex YU rok poezije 1967 - 2007 (Songs of Brotherhood, Childhood & Offspring: Anthology of Ex YU Rock Poetry 1967 – 2007).

== Members ==
Former members

- Milan Delčić "Delča" – vocals (1980–1985, 1986, 1989–1991, 2006) (died 2011)
- Aleksandar Vasiljević "Vasa" – guitar (1980–1985, 1989–1991, 2006)
- Zoran Vulović "Vule" – keyboards (1980–1985, 1986–1987, 1989–1991, 2006)
- Miloš Obrenović – drums (1980–1985, 2006)
- Aleksandar Lukić "Luka" – bass guitar (1980–1985) guitar (1989–1991, 2006)
- Zdravko Jurković – guitar (1986)
- Dario Kumerle – bass guitar (1986)
- Davor Vidiš – drums (1986)
- Aleksandar Tabaš – vocals (1987)
- Zoran Veljković "Kiza" – guitar (1987)
- Dejan Škopelja "Škopi" – bass (1987, 1989–1991, 2006)
- Marko Milivojević – drums (1987)
- Ratko Ljubičić – drums (1989–1991)

Touring musicians

- Dejan Grujić – bass guitar (1983)

== Discography ==
=== Studio albums ===
- Godine ljubavi (1982)
- O je! (1983)
- Nove godine! (1983)
- Budimo zajedno! (1984)
- U škripcu (1987)
- Izgleda da mi smo sami (1990)

=== Live albums ===
- Jubilarnih 20 i nešto godina (as Delča a i U Škripcu; 2008)

=== Compilation albums ===
- Greatest Hits Collection (2019)

=== Singles ===
- "Nove godine" / "Beograd spava" (1983)
- "Uzmi sve što želiš, crni anđele" / "Baj, baj" (1987)

=== Other appearances ===
- "Pamflex dom" / "Južno voće" (Artistička radna akcija; 1981)
- "Stjuardesa" (Beograde; 1991)

== See also ==
- New wave music in Yugoslavia
