= Narodno pozorište =

Studio album by Familija
- Released: 1995
- Genre: Ska; pop rock; downtempo
- Length: 33:46
- Label: PGP RTS
- Producer: Đorđe Petrović

Familija chronology
Narodno pozorište (1995)	Seljačka buna (1997)

Narodno pozorište is the debut album by the Serbian rock supergroup Familija, released in 1995.

In 2021 the album was polled 99th on the list of 100 best Serbian rock albums published after the breakup of SFR Yugoslavia. The list was published in the book Kako (ni)je propao rokenrol u Srbiji (How Rock 'n' Roll in Serbia (Didn't) Came to an End).

== Background ==
The album was the result of the collaboration of U Škripcu and Košava members Aleksandar "Vasa" Vasiljević (guitar) and Aleksandar "Luka" Lukić (guitar) with former Vampiri members Dejan "Peja" Pejović (vocals), Dejan "Dexi" Petrović (vocals) and drummer Goran "Gedža" Redžepi, in order to play music different than the one played in their own bands.

The album was recorded at the Music Factory studio except for the opening track ("Baltazar"), which was recorded at the Studio "O" in Belgrade. The chorus of this track referred to Professor Balthazar cartoon series, which was very popular in SFRJ during the 1970s. The track "Trajna Nina" featured lyrics from the Beatles track "Yellow Submarine".

== Track listing ==
1. "Baltazar" (3:15) (Aleksandar Lukić, Dejan Petrović)
2. "Trajna Nina" (3:02) (Aleksandar Vasiljević)
3. "Nije mi ništa" (2:17) (Dejan Pejović)
4. "Beep" (0:06) (Familija)
5. "Ringišpil" (2:18) (Dejan Pejović)
6. "Što ja volim taj seks" (4:01) (Aleksandar Lukić)
7. "Ljubavna (ova pesma ne)" (2:41) (Aleksandar Vasiljević)
8. "Dosta" (4:13) (Aleksandar Vasiljević)
9. "Sat" (3:28) (Dejan Pejović)
10. "Mala, mala" (3:19) (Dejan Pejović)
11. "Crno belo šareno" (5:06) (Dejan Pejović)

== Familija ==
- Aleksandar "Luka" Lukić (bass)
- Aleksandar "Vasa" Vasiljević (guitar, vocals)
- Dejan "Peja" Pejović (vocals)
- Dejan "Dexi" Petrović (vocals)
- Ratko "Rale" Ljubičić (drums)
- Goran "Gedža" Redžepi (percussion)

== Legacy ==
In 2021 the album was polled 99th on the list of 100 best Serbian rock albums published after the breakup of SFR Yugoslavia. The list was published in the book Kako (ni)je propao rokenrol u Srbiji (How Rock 'n' Roll in Serbia (Didn't) Came to an End).
