= The Dibidus =

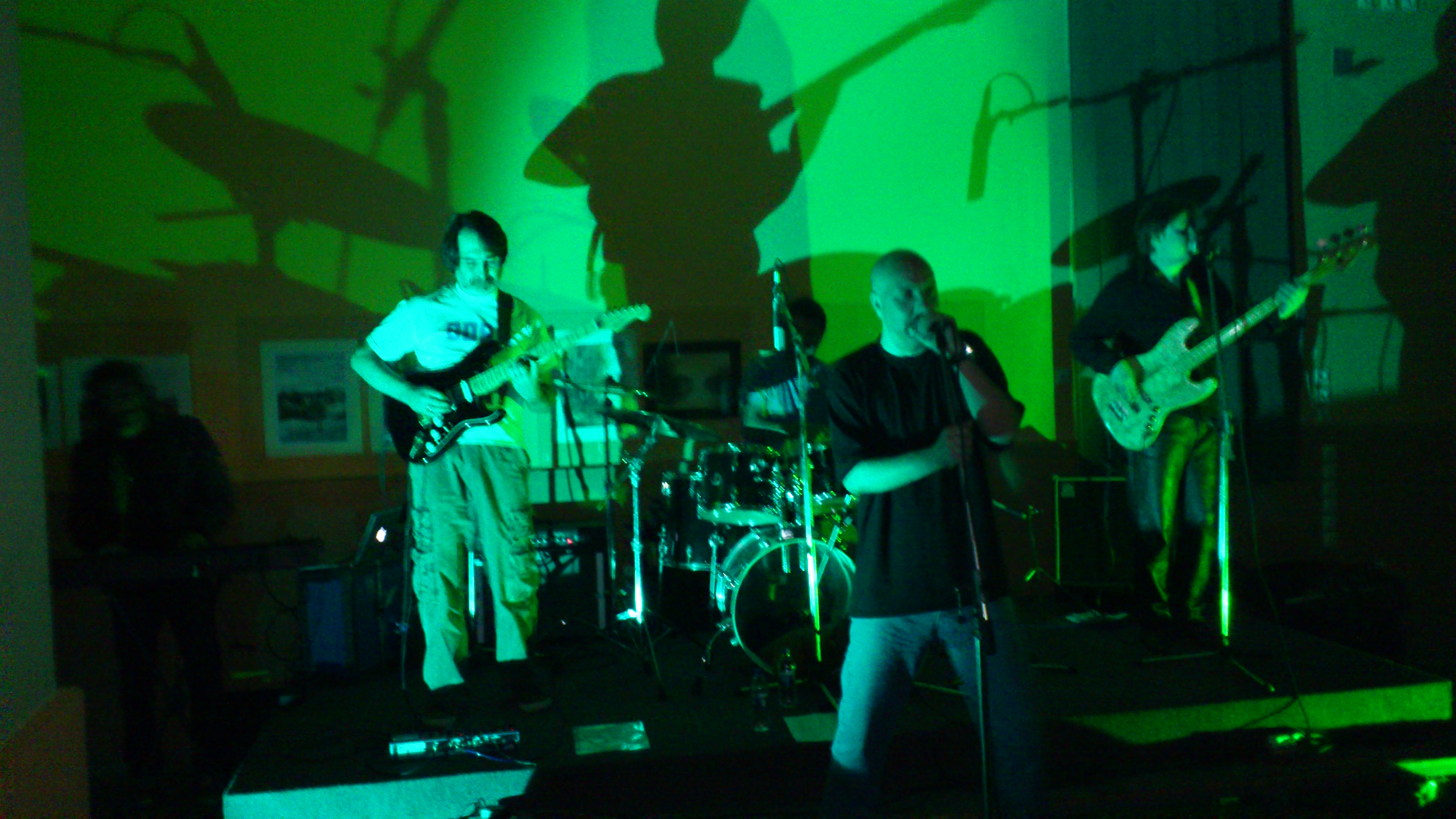
- The Dibidus performing live in Aleksinac in 2013

Background information
- Origin: Belgrade, Serbia
- Genres: Ska; pop rock; world music
- Years active: 2001-2004; 2007–present
- Labels: BK Sound, Long Play, Mascom Records
- Members: Dejan Pejović; Saša Petrov; Dejan Resanović; Dejan Tomović; Nenad Đorđević; Milan Sarić; Jova Jović; Milan Milić
- Website: www.thedibidus.com

The Dibidus is a Serbian pop rock/ska band formed in Belgrade in 2001.

The Dibidus was formed by former Vampiri and Familija member Dejan Pejović "Peja", former Deca Loših Muzičara member Jova Jović (guitar) and former Hush member Milan Sarić (bass guitar). After the release of their debut album in 2003, the band disbanded. The band reunited in 2007, releasing their comeback album in 2011. The group is currently on hiatus.

== History ==
=== 2001-2004 ===
The Dibidus was formed in 2001 by former Vampiri and Familija member Dejan Pejović "Peja", former Deca Loših Muzičara member Jova Jović (guitar) and former Hush member Milan Sarić (bass guitar). The three recorded the album The Dibidus, released in 2003 through BK Sound. The album was produced by Đorđe Petrović, and featured Pejović's former bandmate from Familija Ratko Ljubičić on drums, Bistrik Orchestra member Maja Klisinski on percussion, Eyesburn frontman Nemanja Kojić "Kojot" on trombone and Pejović's former bandmates from Vampiri and Familija Goran Redžepi "Gedža" and Dejan Petrović "Dexy" on backing vocals. The keyboards on the album were played by Jović. The album brought minor hit "Nama treba ljubav" ("We Need Love"). In 2004 The Dibidus disbanded.

=== 2007-present ===
In 2007 the band reunited.The new lineup, beside Pejović and Jović, featured former Vampiri member Saša Petrov (guitar) and Milan Milić (trumpet). The band recorded the album Trenerka i sako (Suit Jacket and Tracksuit), released in 2011 through Long Play. The album was produced by the band members themselves. On the album recording, keyboards were played by Jović, and bass guitar was played by both Jović and Petrov. The album featured the song "Pokloniću joj nebo" ("I'll Give Her the Sky"), written by Pejović and originally recorded by Vampiri on their 1993 album Be-Be (Ba-Bies).

Soon after the album release, Jović left the band. The new lineup, beside Pejović, Petrov and Milić, featured former Prljavi Inspektor Blaža i Kljunovi and Alisa member Dejan Resanović (bass guitar), former Karizma and Vampiri member Dejan Tomović "Tomke" (keyboard) and Nenad Đorđević (drums). After only several promotional performances, Milić left the band, and the rest of the lineup recorded the live album Uživo iz kluba "Fest" (Live from the Club Fest) in December 2011, in Belgrade's Fest Club. The album, produced by Vladimir Novičić, was released in early 2013. Beside The Dibidus songs, the album featured Familija songs "Paranoja" ("Paranoia"), "Crno, belo, šareno" ("Black, White, Colorful"), "Nije mi ništa" ("There's Nothing Wrong with Me"), "Boli me kita" ("I Don't Give a Fuck") and "Mala, mala" ("Little, Little"), and the bonus track "Draga" ("Darling"), a duet recorded with Neno Belan.

In 2017, the band released the song "Ni pakao ni raj" ("Neither Hell nor Heaven"), originally recorded in 2013.

== Discography ==
=== Studio albums ===
- The Dibidus (2003)
- Trenerka i sako (2011)

=== Live albums ===
- Uživo iz kluba "Fest" (2013)
