= Bez struje =

Live album by Various Artists
- Released: 1994
- Recorded: 1994; Sava Centar, Belgrade
- Genre: Acoustic music; rock; rop rock; blues; reggae
- Label: MTS Records; Vujin Trade Line AG

Bez struje is a various artists live album, released in 1994, recorded on the unplugged festival held in 1994 in Sava Centar, Belgrade, Serbia. The album features eighteen acts, mostly of the Serbian rock scene.

== Track listing ==
Bez struje
No.	Title	Performer	Length
1.	"Računajte na nas" (Rani Mraz cover)	Rambo Amadeus	1:28
2.	"Šizika"	Laki Pingvini	4:40
3.	"Kiza rok" (Heroji cover)	Milutin & Trinidad Trip Band	3:37
4.	"Plava jutra" (Rex Ilusivii & Marina Perazić cover)	Ana Sofrenović	3:40
5.	"Adio stres"	Babe	4:04
6.	"Ona hoće mambo"	Branka Katić & Trinidad Trip Band	3:04
7.	"95-52-95..."	Nesalomivi	2:30
8.	"Ponekad"	Eva Braun	2:33
9.	"Ruža ispod pepela"	Dejan Cukić	4:20
10.	"Zgromiću te ja"	Đura & Heroji	4:05
11.	"Koliko imaš godina"	Delča & Ekstazi	4:22
12.	"Fishing Blues"	Point Blank	3:06
13.	"Samo poželi"	Roze Poze	3:01
14.	"Era Vulgaris"	Du Du A	4:52
15.	"Ima mesta za sve"	Del Arno Band	4:50
16.	"Country Boy"	Sirova Koža	6:00
17.	"Baby"	Pussy Cat	4:34
18.	"Good Luck Mr. Duck"	B-Ton	3:51
19.	"Ovde, ovde"	Kazna Za Uši	3:00
