= Princ od Vranje =

Serbian singer (born 1993)

Princ od Vranje Принц од Врање
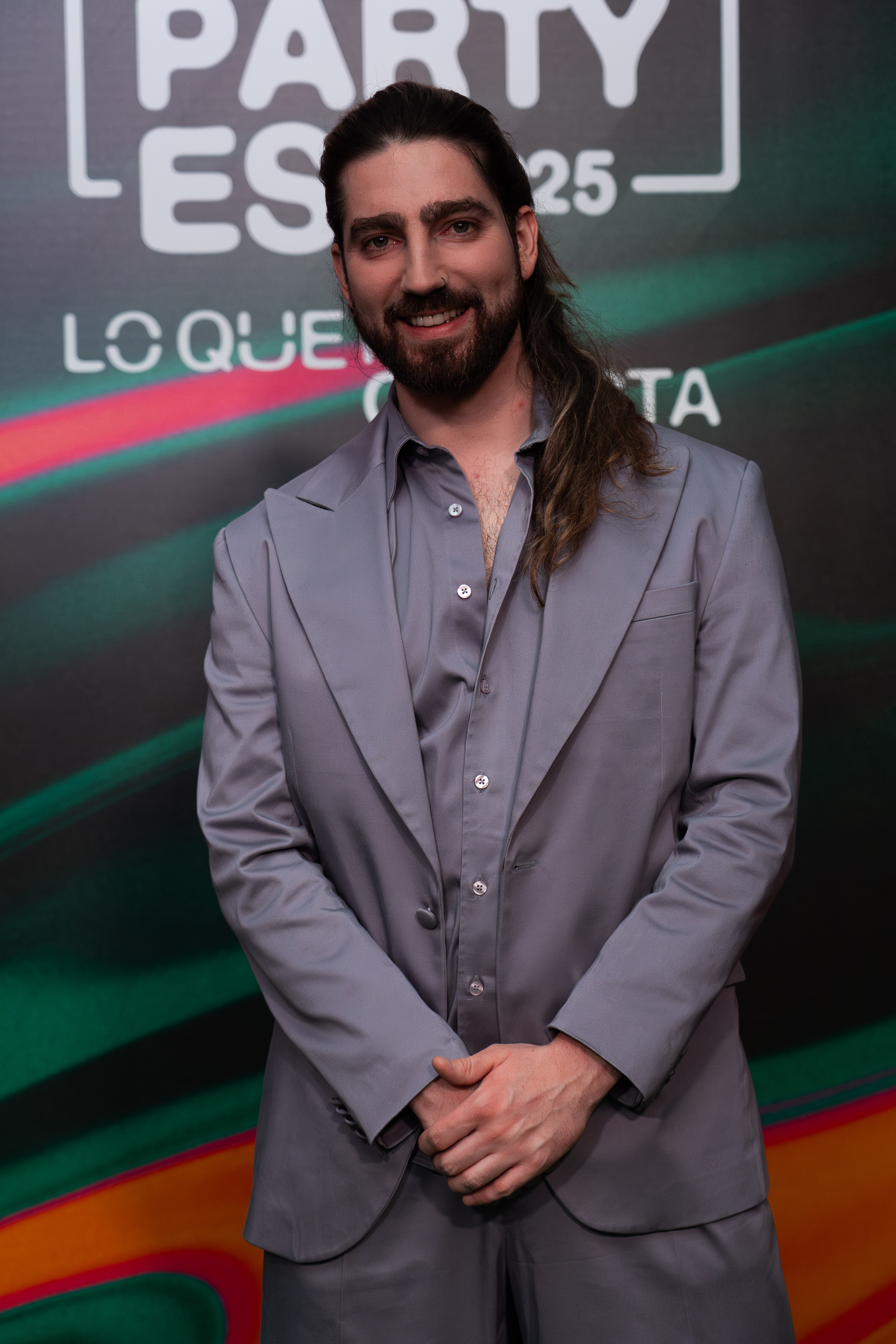
- Prince od Vranje in 2025

Background information
- Born: Stefan Zdravković; 29 September 1993 (age 33); Vranje, Serbia, FR Yugoslavia
- Occupation: Singer
- Instruments: Vocals; guitar; drums
- Years active: 2016–present

Stefan Zdravković (Serbian: Стефан Здравковић; born 29 September 1993), known professionally as Princ od Vranje (Serbian: Принц од Врање, lit. 'Prince of Vranje') or simply Princ, is a Serbian singer. He represented Serbia in the Eurovision Song Contest 2025 with the song "Mila".

== Early life and education ==
Stefan Zdravković was born in Vranje, and has lived in Belgrade since 2002. He was the Serbian national champion and vice-champion in karate as well as competed for the national team. In high school, at the age of 15, he began to play music, when he formed the band Šesta Žica with his friends. He is a philologist by profession, having graduated from the Department of Scandinavian Languages, Literature and Culture, Norwegian Language, at the University of Belgrade Faculty of Philology.

== Career ==
=== 2016–2021: Early career ===
Apart from singing, Princ od Vranje plays the guitar and drums. Since 2016, he has been the lead singer of the band Sisyphus. In 2020, he was cast in the lead role in the rock opera Jesus Christ Superstar by Andrew Lloyd Webber and Tim Rice, organized by the Cultural Center of the Student City.

Princ od Vranje has participated in many festivals, such as the Slavyanski Bazaar in Belarus. He is the winner of the International Music Competition "River Notes" in Bulgaria, and also won one of the largest music festivals in Malta. Apart from that, he has also participated in festivals in Kazakhstan, Lithuania, Italy and Spain. He wrote the song "Lepo moje Vranje", which was sung by his friend Đorđe Popović. In Glasat na Bulgaria, out of 4,000 applicants, he entered the top 12, i.e. the semi-finals, in 2021.

=== 2022–2024: Pesma za Evroviziju '22 and '23 ===
On 14 January 2022, it was announced that Princ was one of thirty-six entries selected for Pesma za Evroviziju '22. However, on 19 January 2022, he announced his withdrawal from the contest due to conflicts with songwriter Leontina regarding the song "Ljubi svog čoveka". The song was instead performed by Tijana Dapčević, who had represented Macedonia in the Eurovision Song Contest 2014, under an altered version titled "Ljubi, ljubi doveka".

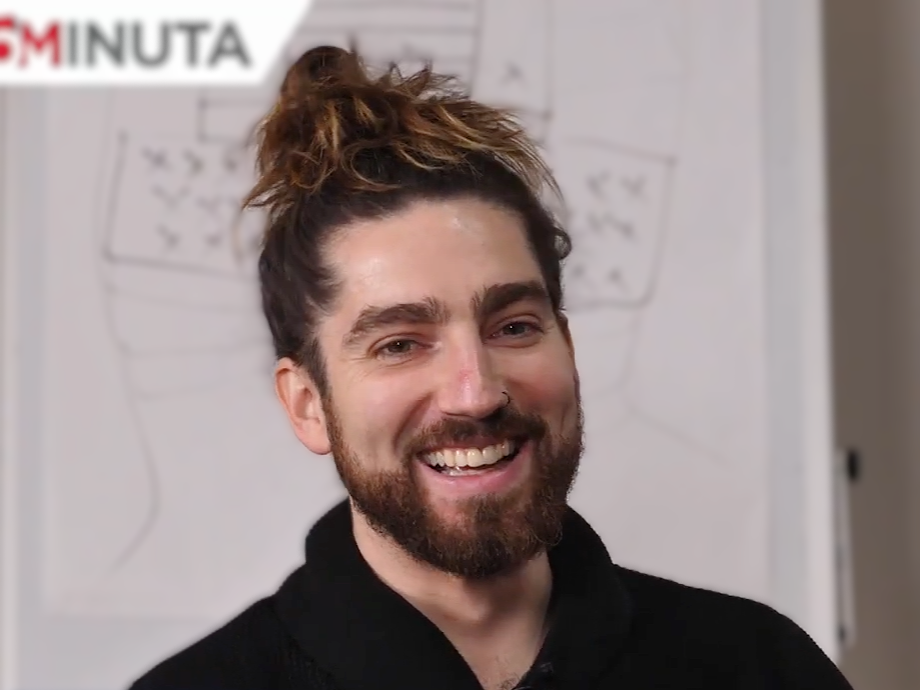
Princ od Vranje in 2023

The following year, in 2023, it was announced that Princ would participate in the Pesma za Evroviziju '23 with the song "Cvet sa istoka", written by Dušan Bačić and arranged by Dejan Nikolić. The published voting results showed that Princ won the most audience votes in both the first semi-final and the final, but in the final total with the jury votes, he came in second place, just behind Luke Black.

=== 2025–present: Eurovision Song Contest and Mila ===
In December 2024, Princ od Vranje was announced as a contestant in Pesma za Evroviziju '25 with the song "Mila". After qualifying for the second semi-final, he won the competition on 28 February 2025. On 2 May, Princ released his debut studio album, Mila, featuring the aforementioned title track. At the Eurovision Song Contest in Switzerland, he participated in the second semi-final, held on 15 May, but failed to qualify to the grand final. This marked the first time since 2017 that Serbia failed to do so as well as fourth overall. It was later revealed that he placed 14th out of 16 participants in the second semi-final, making him the worst placed Serbian entrant in the contest ever.

== Discography ==
=== Studio albums ===
Title	Details	Peak chart positions
Title	Details	CRO Dom.
Mila	Released: 2 May 2025; Label: PGP-RTS, Croatia Records; Formats: CD, digital download, streaming	2

=== Singles ===
Title	Year	Album or EP
"Samo mi je lepo"	2022	Mila
"Cvet sa Istoka"	2023	Mila
"Divna"	2023	Mila
"Mirno" (with Goca Tržan)	2023	Mila
"Kad poželiš" (with Regina)	2023	Non-album single
"Ajša"	2024	Mila
"Čardak"	2024	Mila
"Ela Ela"	2024	Mila
"Belo"	2024	Mila
"Paučina" (with Šejla Zonić)	2024	Mila
"Mila"	2025	Mila
"Lejla"	2025	Non-album single

== Awards and nominations ==
Year	Award	Category	Nominee(s)	Result	Ref.
2025	Eurovision Awards	Luscious Locks	Himself	Nominated	

Awards and achievements
Preceded by Teya Dora with "Ramonda"	Serbia in the Eurovision Song Contest; 2025	Succeeded by Lavina with "Kraj mene"
