= Mila (song) =

2025 song by Princ

Single by Princ

from the album Mila
- Language: Serbian
- English title: Darling
- Released: 27 January 2025
- Length: 2:57
- Label: PGP-RTS
- Composer: Dušan Bačić
- Lyricist: Dušan Bačić
- Producers: Dejan Nikolić; Haris Džinović (revamp only); Željko Joksimović (revamp only)

Princ singles chronology
| "Paučina" (2024) | "Mila" (2025) | "Lejla" (2025) |

Music video
- "Mila" on YouTube

Eurovision Song Contest 2025 entry
- Country: Serbia
- Artist: Princ
- Languages: Serbian
- Composer: Dušan Bačić
- Lyricist: Dušan Bačić

Finals performance
- Semi-final result: 14th
- Semi-final points: 28

Entry chronology
- ◄ "Ramonda" (2024)
- "Kraj mene" (2026) ►

"Mila" (Serbian Cyrillic: Мила; transl. Darling) is a song by Serbian singer Princ. The song was released on 27 January 2025 by PGP-RTS and was written by Dušan Bačić. It represented Serbia at the Eurovision Song Contest 2025. It also serves as the title track for his debut studio album Mila.

== Background and composition ==
"Mila" was written by Dušan Bačić. It was originally produced by Dejan Nikolić. A revamped version of "Mila", produced by Nikolić, Haris Džinović and Željko Joksimović, was released in May 2025.

Described as a romantic love ballad, Princ stated that "Mila" is the hardest song he ever had to sing, due to the numerous dynamics and kinds of changes in the arrangement. He also said that the song represents what he is going through in his love life at that time. He stated that one of the messages is that when you love someone, sometimes you have to accept that you can't be together.

== Critical reception ==
Professional ratings
Review scores
| Source | Rating |
|---|---|
| Mixer | 6/10 |
| Wiwibloggs | 4.70/10 |
| Yle | 8/10 |

In a Wiwibloggs review containing several reviews from several critics, the song was rated 4.70 out of 10 points, earning 34th out of the 37 songs competing in that year's Eurovision in the site's annual ranking that year. Jon O'Brien from Vulture ranked the song 35th out of 37, calling the song a "cannon fodder". Doron Lahav ranked the song 33th out of 37, stating that while it has meaningful lyrics and beautiful melody, he called the song inaccurate and outdated. Eva Frantz from the Finnish broadcaster Yle gave the song a 8/10, describing the song as "beautiful and languid". Anđelo Jurkas of Mixer rated it 6/10, comparing it to Zdravko Čolić's 1980s filler material: "Although all the schemes and clichés of Eurovision songcraft are omnipresent, and Princ with a song like this would instantly find his princess among the passionate viewers and contestants of Gospodin Savršeni, there's no end in sight to the showbiz banalisation."

== Eurovision Song Contest ==
=== Pesma za Evroviziju '25 ===
Serbia's national broadcaster Radio Television of Serbia (RTS) organised Pesma za Evroviziju '25, the national final to select Serbia's representative for the Eurovision Song Contest 2025. The selection consisted of two semi-finals on 25 and 26 February 2025, and a final on 28 February, with the original dates having been 25, 27 February and 1 March. Fifteen contestants competed in each semi-final, with eight qualifying for the final from each.

Princ was officially announced as participants on 10 December 2024, being drawn to perform third in the first semi-final. He qualified, finishing in second with a total of 3,298 votes. In the grand final, Princ was drawn to perform in eighth. He earned second the juries and third in the televote, earning a split score of 10 jury points and 8 televote points for a total of 18 points, 1 more than runner-up "Aladin" by Harem Girls. As a result of winning the competition, he earned the right to represent Serbia at Eurovision 2025.

=== At Eurovision ===
The Eurovision Song Contest 2025 took place at the St. Jakobshalle in Basel, Switzerland, and consisted of two semi-finals held on 13 and 15 May, respectively, and the final on 17 May 2025. During the allocation draw held on 28 January 2025, Serbia was drawn to compete in the second semi-final, performing in the second half of the show. Princ was later drawn to perform in 15th in the semi-final, after Germany's Abor & Tynna and before Finland's Erika Vikman.

At the end of the show, "Mila" did not get announced as a qualifier for the final, marking the first time since 2017 that Serbia failed to qualify for the final. It was later revealed that Serbia placed fourteenth out of the sixteen participating countries in the second semi-final with 28 points, marking Serbia's worst result in the contest to date.
