= Aux Manir =

Contemporary art group from Serbia

Coordinates: 45.00814°N 19.82208°E

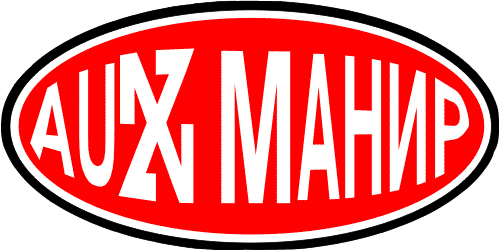
Aux Manir logo

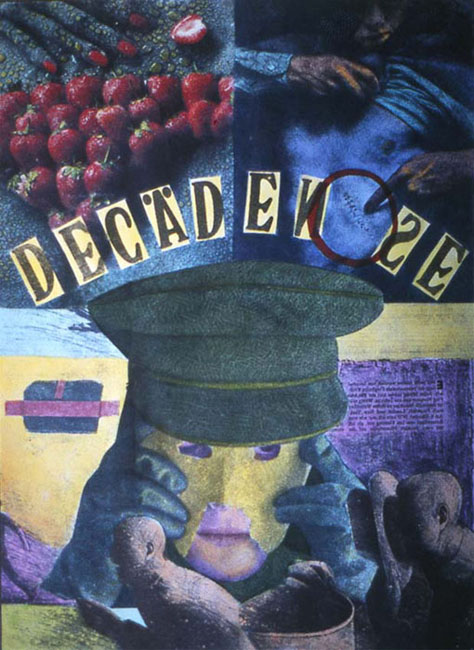
Decadense

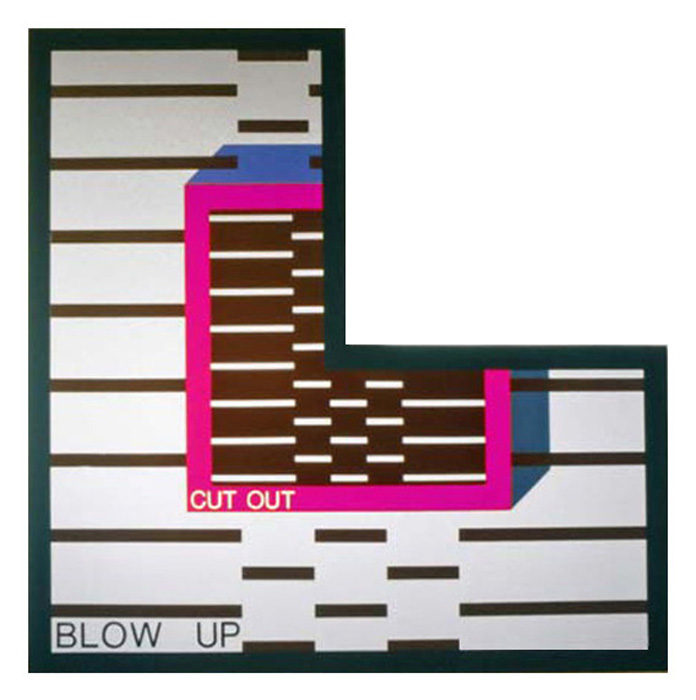
Cut out Blow up

Aux Maniere, later AUX Manir Slobodan Sajin was a contemporary art group from Serbia in 1982-2009, established by Slobodan Šajin (1952–2009) and Momčilo Rajin (1954).

== History ==
=== First phase: Duo ===
In 1975, Šajin and Rajin, both historians of art and artists, participated in Serbian conceptual art group "Group 143".

From 1980–1982 Slobodan Šajin worked on silk-screen printing and developed a unique art graphic (print) monotyping technique called "REPRINT" (REcycle PRINT). The technique became the base of the artworks that "Aux Maniere" made in the following several years.

"Aux Maniere" was established in 1982. From 1982 until 1985, group designed record covers for famous Serbian pop-rock groups, such as U škripcu and Laki pingvini.

=== Second phase: One man group ===
After Momčilo Rajin left in 1986, Aux Maniere became a one man group - Slobodan Šajin.

From 1986-1990 Aux Maniere produced collections of abstract art paintings.

After the beginning of civil war in Yugoslavia in 1991, Šajin engaged in commercial arts. After the fall of Slobodan Milošević's regime in Serbia (2000), he started again making fine arts. In 2002 he promoted a new art brand, Trash brand AUX MANIR, which became the name of the group.

In his last five years Šajin exhibited in his house garden, place named "Plain air gallery".

== Significant exhibitions and works ==
- 1983. "Media Transformations", Museum of Contemporary Art, Belgrade, Serbia
- 1984. "Fin de siecle", Happy Gallery SKC, Belgrade, Serbia
- 1985. "Fin the siecle -This is today", City of Zagreb Galleries, Zagreb, Croatia
- 1985. "I gioielli della lirica", Happy Gallery SKC, Belgrade, Serbia
- 1985. "Suspicious minds", LandsMuseum, Ruma, Serbia
- 1986. "Armagedon - Bridges 86", Pavilion "Cvijeta Zuzorić", Belgrade, Serbia

"Aux Maniere", "Verbumprogram", "Alter Imago", Raša Todosijević, Miško Šuvaković, Feđa Klikovac, Dušan Otašević, Halil Tikveša, Era Milivojević, Dragoslav Krnajski, Goran Đorđević

- 1986. "Interstellar signalization", Hotel lobby, Ruma, Serbia
- 1987. "Groups in Yougoslav art of 80's", Gallery Meander, Apatin, Serbia. "Alter Imago", "Aux Maniere", IRWIN
- 1988. "Simulacrum", Mail Art. Small paintings, reprints and flyers. Art works-gifts randomly delivered.
- 1989. "The need for picture", Contemporary Gallery, Pančevo, Serbia

Aux Maniere, Laslo Kerekeš, Sombati Balint, Dragomir Ugren, Varga Somodji Tibor, Rada Čupić, Jozef Ač, Milan Konjovic ...

- 1990. "Rosenzwei Collection", Gallery ESC. Belgrade, Serbia: "Alter Imago", "Aux Maniere", Marcus Geiger, Franz West, Raša Todosijević, Apostolović, Klikovac, Susnik, Salamun, Slak, Schubert, Jurić.
- 1990. "Materialita: Ground of geometry", Gallery ULUS, 31.October Art salon, Belgrade, Serbia: "Aux Maniere", Sandro Djukić, Marcus Geiger, Dusan Jurić, Fedja Klikovac, Marjetica Potrc, Edita Schubert, Raša Todosijević, Franz West, Heimo Zobernig, "Alter Imago", Willi Kopf
- 1990. Aux Maniere works, Landsmuseum, Ruma, Serbia
- 1991. "Four Yougoslav art groups", Advertising booklet. Landsmuseum, Ruma, Serbia: "Alter Imago", "Aux Maniere"
- 1992. "U Maniru - Mini retrospective", Museum of Yugoslav Kinoteka, Belgrade, Serbia
- 2002. "Miscellaneous works", Plain air gallery, Ruma, Serbia
- 2003. "Pictures for bedroom", Plain air gallery, Ruma, Serbia
- 2005. "Centaur pictures - Cyber incrustatio", Plain air gallery, Ruma, Serbia
