= Ritam =

- Cover of the November 1989 issue, featuring Neneh Cherry
- Editor-in-Chiefs: Momčilo Rajin (1989-1990); Branko Vukojević (1990–1991); Dragan Ambrozić (1992–1995)
- Categories: Popular culture
- Frequency: Monthly (1989–1991) irregular (1992–1995)
- Publisher: Sportinvest / ROID Vuk Karadžić (1989-1990); Ritam / IP Vuk Karadžić (1990-1992); Ritam / Sorabia Disk (1990-1992); Ritam (1993-1995)
- Founded: 1989
- First issue: 1 February 1989
- Final issue: June 1995
- Country: SFR Yugoslavia (1989-1992); FR Yugoslavia (1992–1995)
- Language: Serbo-Croatian
- Website: Ritam archive at Popboks.com

Ritam (Serbian Cyrillic: Ритам, transl. Rhythm) was a Serbian and Yugoslav popular culture magazine. Started in February 1989, it continued under various subtitles and publishing companies until 1995. Initially a monthly publication (from 1989 until 1991), Ritam's publishing frequency became fairly irregular from the beginning of the breakup of Yugoslavia in 1991 until the end of its run. The magazine's original 1989–1991 incarnation is often described as one of Yugoslavia's most influential music and popular culture publications.

== History ==
Ritam was founded in 1989 with the subtitle of Mesečni vodič kroz popularnu muziku, film, video, strip... i još više! (Monthly guide through popular music, film, video, comics... and more!). It was co-published by two companies — Sportinvest from Belgrade and ROID Vuk Karadžić from Paraćin. The magazine's first editor-in-chief was Momčilo Rajin. The first Ritam issue, featuring U2 band members, actor Jackie Chan, and comic book character Corto Maltese on the cover, was released on 1 February 1989. The magazine was printed in small format, 14x22 cm, in black and white. Until June 1990, 14 issues were released.

From September 1990, the magazine adopted a different name, Novi Ritam (The New Rhythm), as well as a shortened subtitle, Mesečni vodič kroz popularnu kulturu (Monthly guide through popular culture), and Rajin's post was taken over by Branko Vukojević. The magazine staff also registered their own publishing company called Ritam, and continued to cooperate with Paraćin's Vuk Karadžić. This lasted until May 1991, during which time 8 issues appeared.

At the end of 1992, following a year-and-a-half long gap, the magazine's third incarnation appeared, entitled Ritam again, under editorship of Dragan Ambrozić. In addition to Ritam publishing company, record label Sorabia Disk was also listed as the magazine's publisher. Only two issues appeared under this setup, the first in October, with Rambo Amadeus on the cover, and the second in December, with Michael Stipe on the cover.

In 1993, Ritam's fourth incarnation appeared. Again with Ambrozić as editor-in-chief, and with the subtitle Vodič kroz popularnu kulturu (Guide through popular culture), the annual issue was published for the year 1993. Five more issues came out with irregular frequency from May 1994 until June 1995, when the magazine was finally discontinued.

In 2004, online magazine Popboks was founded, containing a digitalized archive of Ritam.

== Journalists and contributors ==
Some of the journalists and contributors to Ritam during its activity include:

- Miomir Biblija
- Zoran Ćirić
- Ante Čikara
- Ana Davidović
- Aleksandar Delibašić
- Aleksandar Dragaš
- Nedeljko Drobac
- Tomislav Gruić
- Ivan Ilić
- Zoran Janjetov
- Nenad Jevtić
- Aleksandar Konjikušić
- Aleksandar Kostić
- Miloš Krečković
- Srđan "Đile" Marković
- Marina Martić
- Goran Matić
- Goranka Matić
- Olja Miletić
- Boško Milin
- Nebojša Mišković
- Aleksandra Nikšić
- Marjan Ogrinc
- Gordan Paunović
- Vesna Pavlović
- Zoran Penevski
- Dragan Petrović
- Duško Piljak
- Predrag Popović
- Božidar Radojčić
- Saša Radojević
- Dušan Ristić
- Žikica Simić
- Jelena Subotić
- Uroš Stojanović
- Goran Terzić
- Slobodan Vujanović
- Isidora Žebeljan
- Bojan Žikić
- Bane Živković
