= Pesma za Evroviziju '25 =

Serbian national selection for the Eurovision Song Contest 2025

Pesma za Evroviziju 2025
- Lepota će spasiti svet (Лепота ће спасити свет); English: Beauty Will Save the World

Dates and venue
- Semi-final 1: 25 February 2025
- Semi-final 2: 26 February 2025
- Final: 28 February 2025
- Venue: RTS Studio 8 Košutnjak, Belgrade, Serbia

Organisation
- Supervisor: Olivera Kovačević
- Broadcaster: Radio Television of Serbia (RTS)
- Presenters: Dragana Kosjerina; Kristina Radenković; Stefan Popović

Participants
- Number of entries: 30
- Number of finalists: 16

Vote
- Voting system: 50/50 combination of jury and public vote
- Winning song: "Mila" by Princ

Pesma za Evroviziju '25 (Serbian Cyrillic: Песма за Евровизију '25; PzE '25) was the fourth edition of Pesma za Evroviziju, the national final organised by Radio Television of Serbia (RTS) to select the Serbian entry for the Eurovision Song Contest 2025. The selection consisted of two semi-finals held on 25 and 26 February 2025, respectively, and a final on 28 February 2025, all presented by Dragana Kosjerina and Kristina Radenković.

== Format and production ==
In 2024, RTS confirmed that the national final format Pesma za Evroviziju would once again be organised to determine its representative at the Eurovision Song Contest 2025. The selection consisted of two semi-finals on 25 and 26 February 2025, and a final on 28 February 2025, with the original dates having been 25, 27 February and 1 March. Fifteen contestants competed in each semi-final, with eight qualifying for the final from each.

== Competing entries ==
On 18 July 2024, RTS opened an online form for interested artists to submit their entries. The submission period was supposed to last until 1 November 2024, but the window was extended until 10 November a few days before the intended closing time. Performers were required to hold Serbian citizenship, whilst there were no limitations as to whom could be a songwriter. At least 51% of lyrics of the submitted entries had to be in one of the official languages of Serbia. At the closing of the deadline, 222 entries had been submitted.

30 competing acts were selected and announced on 10 December 2024. Returnees to the Serbian national final include:

- Bojana x David and Dušan Kurtić, who competed the previous year;
- Filarri, who competed in 2023 and 2024;
- Gift (as part of Gifts and Roses), who competed in 2022 and 2023;
- Princ, who competed in 2023;
- Jelena Pajić, who competed in 2022;
- Aleksa Vučković and Dimitrije Borčanin (both as part of AltCtrl), who competed in Beovizija 2020 and 2022 as part of the band Lift;
- Biber, who competed in Beovizija and Evropesma-Europjesma in 2006, Beovizija 2018 and 2022;
- Igor Simić, who competed in Beovizija 2020 and 2022;
- Maja Nikolić, who competed in Beovizija in 2003, 2004, 2006, 2007 and 2018, Evropesma-Europjesma 2006 and Beosong 2013;
- Tanja Banjanin, who competed in Evropesma-Europjesma 2004.

On 31 December 2024, RTS announced that Buč Kesidi with the song "Tužne ljubavi" were disqualified from the contest, due to performing their song prior to 1 September 2024 at the Sea Side Festival, which goes against the contest's rules. They were replaced by Maršali with the song "Po policama sećanja". On 8 January 2025, RTS announced that Dram with the song "Vanja" were also disqualified due to performing their song prior to 1 September 2024. They were replaced by Lensy with the song "Hvala ti".

Key

Disqualified Replacement

Pesma za Evroviziju '25 participants
Artist(s)	Song	Authors
AltCtrl	"Mamurna jutra" (Мамурна јутра)	Dimitrije Borčanin; Aleksa Vučković
Ana & The Changes	"Brinem" (Бринем)	Ana Ćurčin; Ivana Butigan
Anton	"U grad" (У град)	Nikola Antonijević
Biber	"Da mi se vratiš" (Да ми се вратиш)	Rastko Aksentijević
Bojana x David	"Šesto čulo" (Шесто чуло)	Violeta Mihajlovska Milić; Boris Subotić
Buč Kesidi	"Tužne ljubavi" (Тужне љубави)	Luka Racić; Zoran Zarubica
Dram	"Vanja" (Вања)	Stefan Aćimović; Marko Arizanović; Nikola Grozdanić; Petar Blagojević
Dušan Kurtić	"Boginja" (Богиња)	Dušan Kurtić; Ivan Kurtić
Jett Vega	"Rolerkoster" (Ролеркостер)	Maya Lavelle; Zoran Leković; Nena Leković
Filarri	"Meet & Greet"	Ljubomir Stefanović
Gifts and Roses	"Do kraja vremena" (До краја времена)	Jovan Matić
Harem Girls	"Aladin" (Аладин)	Nemanja Antonić; Ivan Vukajlović; Katarina Đulić; Sanja Vučić; Titta Foureira
Igor Simić	"Ne mogu" (Не могу)	Adriana Pupavac; Andreas Björkman; Vladimir Danilović; Udo Mechels
Iskaz	"Trendseter" (Трендсетер)	Zoran Stefanov
Ivana Štrbac	"La la la"	Anđela Vujović; Ivan Franović
Jelena Aleen	"Kameleon" (Камелеон)	Branislav Opačić
Kruz Roudi	"Sve i odmah" (Све и одмах)	Mladen Rakić; Nemanja Đorđević; Danilo Milivojević
Lensy	"Hvala ti" (Хвала ти)	Stjepan Jelica; Teodor Ivančević; Adriano Kadović
Maja Nikolić	"Žali srce moje" (Жали срце моје)	Aleksandar Kobac; Aleksandar Ilić; Goran Ratković; Miladin Bogosavljević
Maršali	"Po policama sećanja" (По полицама сећања)	Strahinja Tanasijin
Mila	"Gaia"	Ahmed Hajdarović; Danilo Bogojević
Milan Nikolić feat. Caka	"Storia del amor"	Vladimir Graić; Milan Nikolić
Mimi Mercedez	"Turbo žurka" (Турбо журка)	Mattia Stanišljević; Miloš Đorđević; Milena Janković
Nataša Kojić	"Up and Down"	Nataša Kojić
Oxajo	"Mama"	Dušan Strajnić; Dario Vuksanović; Marko Ajković
Princ	"Mila" (Мила)	Dušan Bačić
Sedlar	"Oči boje zemlje" (Очи боје земље)	Aleksandar Sedlar
Tam	"Durum durum" (Дурум дурум)	Andrija Gavrilović; Tamara Popović; Ivana Lukić
Tanja Banjanin	"Ja sam bolja" (Ја сам боља)	Tanja Banjanin; Novak Pejić; Staša Banjanin
Tropico Band	"AI"	Aleksandar Cvetković; Saša Milošević
Vampiri	"Tebi treba neko kao ja" (Теби треба неко као ја)	Aleksandar Eraković
Vukayla	"Mask"	Sara Vukajlov; Melquiades Alejandro Alvarez Cobos

== Contest overview ==
=== Semi-finals ===
The jury in the semi-finals consisted of: Nikoleta Dojčinović, Miljan Tanić, Nevena Božović, Andrej Ilić and Aleksandar Lokner.

==== Semi-final 1 ====
The first semi-final was held on 25 February 2025. Fifteen songs competed, and the eight songs with the most points qualified for the final.

In addition to the competing entries, Kolibri Choir opened the show with the song "Za milion godina", originally performed by Yu Rock Misija.

Semi-final 1 – 25 February 2025
R/O	Artist	Song	Jury		Televote		Total	Place
R/O	Artist	Song	Votes	Points	Votes	Points	Total	Place
1	Bojana x David	"Šesto čulo"	8	0	5,750	12	12	4
2	Igor Simić	"Ne mogu"	18	3	376	0	3	12
3	Vampiri	"Tebi treba neko kao ja"	15	2	768	3	5	9
4	Nataša Kojić	"Up and Down"	7	0	514	0	0	15
5	Tropiko Band	"AI"	10	0	625	0	0	14
6	Jelena Aleen	"Kameleon"	22	5	643	0	5	10
7	Filarri	"Meet & Greet"	21	4	1,587	7	11	6
8	Kruz Roudi	"Sve i odmah"	28	7	1,431	6	13	2
9	Milan Nikolić feat. Caka	"Storia del amor"	23	6	422	0	6	8
10	Ana & The Changes	"Brinem"	32	8	1,111	5	13	3
11	Iskaz	"Trendseter"	39	12	1,699	8	20	1
12	Harem Girls	"Aladin"	12	1	3,095	10	11	5
13	Biber	"Da mi se vratiš"	36	10	651	1	11	7
14	Mila	"Gaia"	8	0	861	4	4	11
15	Anton	"U grad"	11	0	745	2	2	13

Detailed jury results in the first semi-final of Pesma za Evroviziju ′25
R/O	Song	N. Dojčinović	M. Tanić	N. Božović	A. Ilić	A. Lokner	Total
1	"Šesto čulo"		7			1	8
2	"Ne mogu"			10	8		18
3	"Tebi treba neko kao ja"			6	6	3	15
4	"Up and Down"	7					7
5	"AI"			3	7		10
6	"Kameleon"	10	1	4	5	2	22
7	"Meet & Greet"	8	8	1		4	21
8	"Sve i odmah"	3	12		1	12	28
9	"Storia del amor"	6	2	5		10	23
10	"Brinem"	5	4	12	3	8	32
11	"Trendseter"	12		8	12	7	39
12	"Aladin"	1	5			6	12
13	"Da mi se vratiš"	4	10	7	10	5	36
14	"Gaia"		6		2		8
15	"U grad"	2	3	2	4		11

==== Semi-final 2 ====
The second semi-final was held on 26 February 2025. Fifteen songs competed and the eight songs with the most points qualified for the final.

In addition to the competing entries, in place of a live interval act was a rerun of a PzE '23 interval act: an ethno medley of "Fairytale", "Wild Dances", "Euphoria", "Opa", and "Trenulețul" by Stevan Anđelković, Sanja Vučić, Ivana Peters and Alen Ademović.

Semi-final 2 – 26 February 2025
R/O	Artist	Song	Jury		Televote		Total	Place
R/O	Artist	Song	Votes	Points	Votes	Points	Total	Place
1	Ivana Štrbac	"La la la"	9	0	1,834	4	4	10
2	Džet Vega	"Rolerkoster"	5	0	536	0	0	14
3	Princ	"Mila"	52	12	3,298	7	19	2
4	Maršali	"Po policama sećanja"	6	0	3,358	8	8	7
5	Dušan Kurtić	"Boginja"	21	6	653	0	6	9
6	Tanja Banjanin	"Ja sam bolja"	13	2	782	0	2	12
7	Tam	"Durum durum"	15	4	2,159	6	10	5
8	Gifts & Roses	"Do kraja vremena"	0	0	447	0	0	15
9	Lensy	"Hvala ti"	16	5	1,524	2	7	8
10	Sedlar	"Oči boje zemlje"	46	10	563	0	10	6
11	Maja Nikolić	"Žali srce moje"	10	1	1,532	3	4	11
12	Mimi Mercedez	"Turbo žurka"	41	7	5,507	12	19	1
13	Oxajo	"Mama"	13	3	3,734	10	13	3
14	Vukayla	"Mask"	42	8	1,866	5	13	4
15	AltCtrl	"Mamurna jutra"	1	0	864	1	1	13

Detailed jury results in the second semi-final of Pesma za Evroviziju ′25
R/O	Song	N. Dojčinović	M. Tanić	N. Božović	A. Ilić	A. Lokner	Total
1	"La la la"	4	3		1	1	9
2	"Rolerkoster"				5		5
3	"Mila"	8	12	8	12	12	52
4	"Po policama sećanja"		1			5	6
5	"Boginja"		6	6	7	2	21
6	"Ja sam bolja"	3		3	3	4	13
7	"Durum durum"	7	4	4			15
8	"Do kraja vremena"						0
9	"Hvala ti"		5	7	4		16
10	"Oči boje zemlje"	6	8	12	10	10	46
11	"Žali srce moje"	2	2	1	2	3	10
12	"Turbo žurka"	10	10	5	8	8	41
13	"Mama"	5		2		6	13
14	"Mask"	12	7	10	6	7	42
15	"Mamurna jutra"	1					1

=== Final ===
The final was held on 28 February 2025. Sixteen songs competed, and the winner, "Mila" performed by Princ, was decided by a combination of votes from a jury panel consisting of Snežana Vukomanović, Dragan Đorđević, Zorja Pajić, Dejan Kostić, and jury president Slobodan Marković, and the Serbian public via televoting. All funds collected from the viewer votes were donated to raise funds for the renovation of the Institute of Neonatology of the Clinical Center of Serbia.

In addition to the competing entries, in place of a live interval act was a rerun of a PzE '24 interval act, Luke Black performing his song "Samo mi se spava", and a rerun of a PzE '23 interval act, Konstrakta performing a medley of her songs "In corpore sano" and "Mekano".

Final – 28 February 2025
R/O	Artist	Song	Jury		Televote		Total	Place
R/O	Artist	Song	Votes	Points	Votes	Points	Total	Place
1	Oxajo	"Mama"	15	4	8,634	6	10	7
2	Mimi Mercedez	"Turbo žurka"	20	5	11,294	7	12	5
3	Vukayla	"Mask"	45	12	5,190	4	16	3
4	Ana & The Changes	"Brinem"	15	3	1,479	0	3	10
5	Biber	"Da mi se vratiš"	11	1	1,034	0	1	14
6	Bojana x David	"Šesto čulo"	9	0	33,132	12	12	4
7	Maršali	"Po policama sećanja"	6	0	5,003	3	3	9
8	Princ	"Mila"	42	10	12,413	8	18	1
9	Sedlar	"Oči boje zemlje"	39	8	637	0	8	8
10	Lensy	"Hvala ti"	11	2	2,029	0	2	12
11	Milan Nikolić feat. Caka	"Storia del amor"	0	0	688	0	0	16
12	Harem Girls	"Aladin"	29	7	15,871	10	17	2
13	Tam	"Durum durum"	21	6	7,883	5	11	6
14	Filarri	"Meet & Greet"	8	0	2,402	1	1	13
15	Iskaz	"Trendseter"	11	0	3,278	2	2	11
16	Kruz Roudi	"Sve i odmah"	8	0	1,488	0	0	15

Detailed jury results in the final of Pesma za Evroviziju ′25
R/O	Song	S. Vukomanović	D. Đorđević	Z. Pajić	D. Kostić	S. Marković	Total
1	"Mama"	12	1	2			15
2	"Turbo žurka"		5	4	7	4	20
3	"Mask"	8	12	10	10	5	45
4	"Brinem"	10		5			15
5	"Da mi se vratiš"		4	1		6	11
6	"Šesto čulo"				1	8	9
7	"Po policama sećanja"	2			4		6
8	"Mila"	4	7	7	12	12	42
9	"Oči boje zemlje"	7	8	6	8	10	39
10	"Hvala ti"	1			3	7	11
11	"Storia del amor"						0
12	"Aladin"		10	12	6	1	29
13	"Durum durum"		6	8	5	2	21
14	"Meet & Greet"	5		3			8
15	"Trendseter"	6	3		2		11
16	"Sve i odmah"	3	2			3	8

== Other awards ==
=== OGAE Serbia Award ===
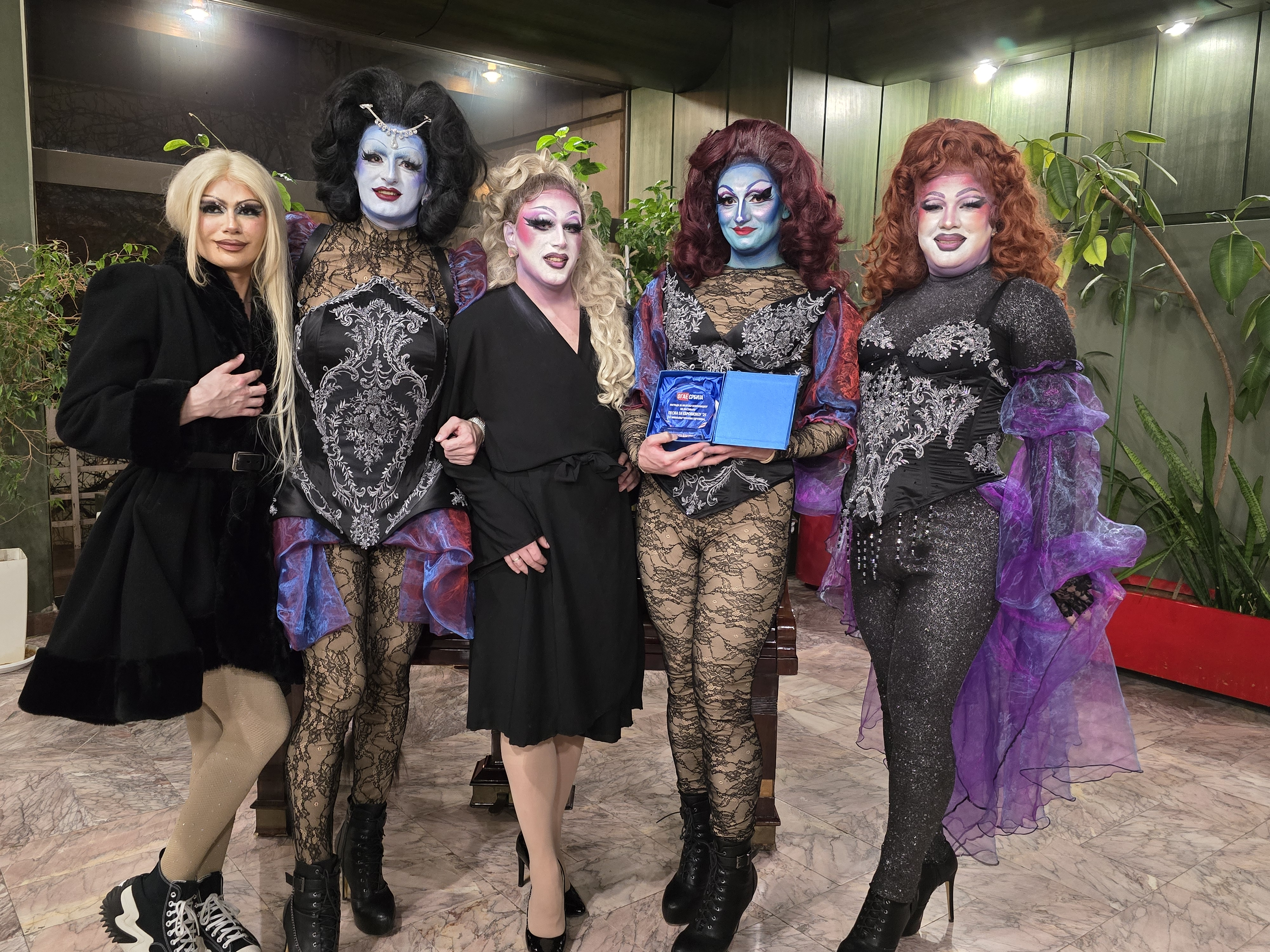
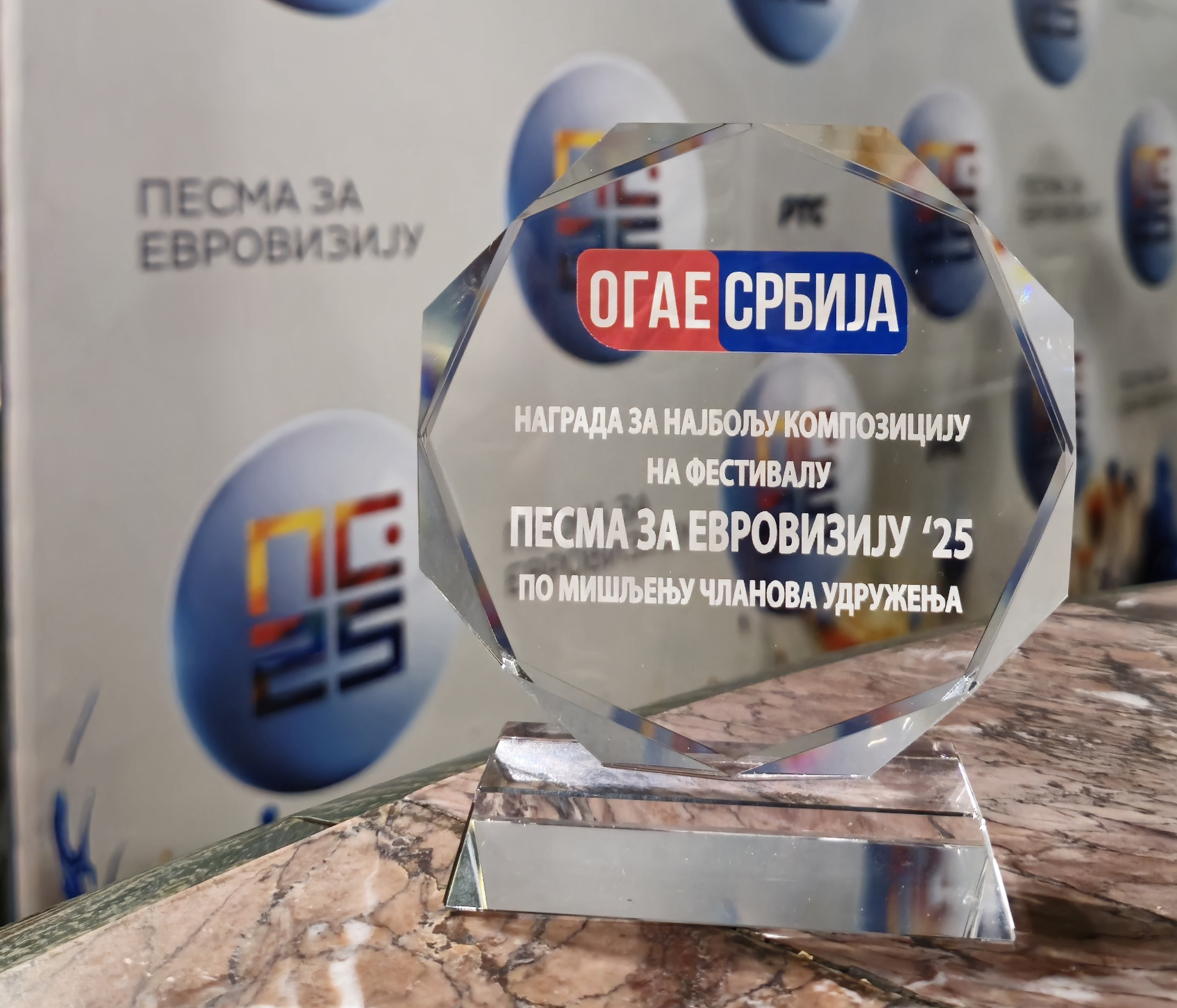
5 members of Harem Girls (left) with the OGAE Serbia award (right)

The OGAE Serbia Award for the Best Song in Pesma za Evroviziju ′25 was voted on by the association members. The award was won by the song "Aladin" by Harem Girls, which was thus designated as the Serbian entry to the OGAE Second Chance Contest 2025.

Artist	Song	Points	Place
Harem Girls	"Aladin"	203	1
Mimi Mercedez	"Turbo žurka"	191	2
Vukayla	"Mask"	186	3
Bojana x David	"Šesto čulo"	143	4
Tam	"Durum durum"	140	5

== Broadcasts and ratings ==
The three shows were aired on RTS1, RTS Svet and RTS Planeta, as well as being streamed online via the broadcaster's website rts.rs and its official YouTube channel. The final was also aired on Radio Beograd 1 and on the official Eurovision Song Contest YouTube channel.

Viewing figures by show on RTS1
Show	Air date	Average viewership	Total viewership	Share (change compared to PzE '24)	Ref.
Semi-final 1	25 February 2024		1,116,000		
Semi-final 2	26 February 2024				
Final	28 February 2024	442,600	1,300,000	17,1% (▼8,91%)	

== Impact of the anti-corruption protests ==
The Serbian anti-corruption protests since November 2024 impacted the organisation of Pesma za Evroviziju in 2025. Slaven Došlo, who had hosted Pesma za Evroviziju '24, was announced as a co-host for the second year in a row. However, on 20 February 2025, Došlo announced his resignation from the role, joining Bojana Vunturišević in boycotting RTS due to its way of reporting on the protests. On 24 February, it was revealed that Đorđe Živadinović would also not be fulfilling his previously announced role as a presenter.

On 24 January 2025, Milan Nikolić announced his intention to withdraw due to "new circumstances" and that he would quit his role as editor at PGP-RTS; despite this, his entry "Storia del amor" was still published along with the other competing entries and would go on to take part in the shows. Other acts also expressed a desire to withdraw from the contest, including Biber, Filarri and Ana Ćurčin (member of Ana & The Changes). Kalina Delić, lead singer of Biber, stated in an interview in late February that a late withdrawal would carry high fees, which they are not able to pay.

During the voting sequence, jury member Dragan Đorđević, before announcing his points, made a comment in support of the protests: "First of all, tonight I would like to vote for justice, education, and dignity, because our students are our strength, our future, and our intelligence." to which presenter Dragana Kosjerina audibly moaned. Furthermore, another jury member, Slobodan Marković, before announcing his points, said "First of all, I would like to apologize for the average bad quality of the songs, which arrived at this year's PZE, kudos to the few exceptions. That's my opinion."

On 31 July 2025, Olivera Kovačević, the supervisor of the competition, was removed from her role due to her support for the protests.
