= Vukayla =

Serbian singer-songwriter (born 2004)

- Born: 6 March 2004 (age 21); Serbia, Serbia and Montenegro
- Genres: alternative pop, electropop
- Occupations: Singer; songwriter

Sara Vukajlov (Serbian Cyrillic: Сара Вукајлов; born 6 March 2004), known professionally as Vukayla (Вукејла), is a Serbian singer-songwriter.

== Early life ==
Vukajlov was born in 2004 into a musical family. She enrolled in a music school in Belgrade at the age of four, where she studied violin, while also studying singing with her mother, who is a classical singing teacher. After participating in "Dida Čarolija", she began taking classical singing lessons.

== Career ==
=== Beginnings ===
Vukajlov had her first audition as part of the "Dida Čarolija" competition in 2008. In the final, she performed the song "Mače" with Jana Tatović.

=== 2018—2025 ===
The song Player of Mine, which Vukajlov wrote shortly after a two-week Berklee College program in Valencia, was submitted to the "Unsigned Only" competition and won a grand slam promotion in 2019, as mentioned in the digital magazine Music Connection. Her original song, I Don't Want You Anymore, won the award for Best Original Song at the Open Mic UK 2020 competition. Vukayla is a student at the Berklee College of Music. In March 2022, she released the EP Mind Games. Her first single under the name Vukayla, I Kill Men Like You, was released on 18 July 2024.

In December 2024, Vukayla with the song "Mask" was announced as a contestant in Serbia's national selection festival for the Eurovision Song Contest 2025, called Pesma za Evroviziju '25.

== Discography ==
=== EPs ===
Title	Details
Mind Games	Released: 9 March 2022; Label: Self-released; Formats: Digital download, streaming

=== Singles ===
Title	Year	Album
"Mače" (with Jana Tatović)	2008	Non-album singles
"I Don’t Want You Anymore"	2019	Non-album singles
"Take Me"	2020	Non-album singles
"I Kill Men Like You"	2024	Non-album singles
"Physique"	2025	Non-album singles
"Mask"	2025	Non-album singles
