= Tam (singer) =

Serbian singer-songwriter (born 1995)

- Born: 31 August 1995 (age 30); Pristina, FR Yugoslavia
- Genres: Pop; electropop; alternative pop; avant-pop
- Occupations: Singer; songwriter
- Years active: 2019-present
- Label: Universal Music

Tamara Popović (Serbian Cyrillic: Тамара Поповић; born 31 August 1995), known professionally as Tam (Там), is a Serbian singer and songwriter. She began her musical career in 2019 when she released her first single, "Kako treba", for which she wrote the lyrics and music herself.

== Early life and education ==
Tamara Popović was born in Pristina, but soon moved to Aranđelovac due to the Kosovo War, and then to Belgrade, where she still lives today. She graduated from the Sixth Belgrade Gymnasium. After high school, she enrolled at the Faculty of Dramatic Arts, majoring in Management and Production in Culture and Media. She graduated in October 2018.

== Career ==
Tam began her professional career in music in 2019, when she released her first single, kako treba, for which she wrote the lyrics and music herself. In 2021, she released her first EP, titled refleksija.

In 2020, Tam signed a contract with Universal Music Serbia, after which she continuously released singles with which she clearly proves her place in pop music, complemented by overtones of other current genres.

Tam has presented herself to the audience through singles that intend to reveal different parts of her personality, among which are "Žad" - a summer hit with the band Zicer Inc, "pogana", "usne uz rebra (nanana)" and "mila" - a collaboration with Jymenik, as well as through the EP release "refleksija" with which she took listeners on a complete musical journey.

The singles “pogana” and “mila”, which are energetic club songs dedicated to all powerful women, their sex appeal and independence, attracted huge attention from the audience, and instantly spread through social networks and streaming services.

In addition to writing lyrics, music and co-producing her own songs, Tam also works for other artists. She has collaborated with local and regional producers and singers such as Miach, Teya Dora, Z++, Nika Turković, Jymenik and Pocket Palma, and made a trip to a different sound by writing and composing for folk star Maya Berović. Since 2019, she has been part of the hip-hop group Zicer Inc. She has performed at festivals such as Exit, Sea Dance, Belgrade Beer Festival and Nišvila.

In December 2024, Tam with the song "Durum durum" was announced as a contestant in Serbia's national selection festival for the Eurovision Song Contest 2025, called Pesma za Evroviziju '25.

== Discography ==
=== EPs ===
- Refleksija (2022)

=== Singles ===
- Kako treba (2019)
- Na holdu (2020)
- Sve dalje (2020)
- Brži od svega (2021)
- Infierno (2021)
- Aj ćao (2021)
- Infierno (remix, Tam and Pocket Palmom, 2021)
- Viva Mais (Mimi Mercedez and Tam, 2021)
- Čežnja (Ivan Jegdić and Tam, 2021)
- Usne uz rebra - nanana (2022)
- Ne pričaj o nama (2022)
- Pogana (2022)
- Rizik (2023)
- Panonija (2023)
- Samo ne ovde (2023)
- Mila (Tam and Jymenik, 2023)
- Dugo (2024)
- Na pustom otoku (Z++ and Tam, 2024)
- Vanilla Sky (Tam and Miach, 2024)
- Durum durum (2025)
