= Momčilo Rajin =

Art and music critic, artist, cultural historian, media theorist, art curator, publisher

- Born: Momčilo Rajin; 23 February 1954 (age 72) Bela Crkva, PR Serbia, FPR Yugoslavia
- Areas: Art and music critic, theorist and historian
- Notable works: "Postpop" 1 & 2

Momčilo "Moma" Rajin (born 23 February 1954 in Bela Crkva) is a Serbian art and music critic, theorist and historian, artist, publisher and cultural facilitator, living and working in Belgrade.

== Biography ==
He graduated in 1978. at the Faculty of Philosophy in Belgrade, Department of History of Art, on the theme "Rock Graphics".

Being notable critic and theorist of culture and arts, he was also editor and/or publisher of important Yugoslav pop-culture magazines and journals: Džuboks and Ritam (pop-rock music), YU strip (comics) and Moment (contemporary arts), etc.

He is considered as one of the key people of new wave music in Yugoslavia, promoting and influencing bands like "Idoli", "Električni orgazam" and "Šarlo Akrobata", as well as of Serbian/Yugoslav comics, supporting early careers of Zoran Janjetov, Rajko Milošević - Gera, Zoran Tucić, Dejan Nenadov or Darko Perović.

He was member of art group "Aux Maniere" with Slobodan Šajin (1982-1986).

== Bibliography ==
- Momčilo Rajin. Post Pop 1 - Tekstovi 2002-2004, "Draslar", Beograd, 2006, ISBN 86-7614-052-9
- Momčilo Rajin. Post Pop 2 - Tekstovi 2004-2006, "Draslar", Beograd, 2006, ISBN 86-7614-067-7
