= Vampiri =

Yugoslav and Serbian rock band

Background information
- Origin: Belgrade, Serbia
- Genres: Doo-wop; rockabilly; rock and roll; pop rock; rock
- Years active: 1987–1998; 2012–present
- Labels: PGP-RTB, ZAM, PGP-RTS, Komuna
- Members: Aleksandar Eraković; Arsenije Tubić; Nikola Sarić; Nikola Nemešević; Andrej Bućan; Miloš Šikman
- Past members: Dejan Pejović; Dejan Petrović; Dušan Varda; Dušan Pavlović; Dejan Jovanović; Goran Redžepi; Borivoje Borac; Dejan Tomović; Saša Petrov; Dragan Novaković; Srđan Milenković; Jožef Pilasanović; Saša Filčić; Srđan Jovanović; Marko Ćalić; Damjan Dašić; Nemanja Dašić

Vampiri (Serbian Cyrillic: Вампири, trans. The Vampires) are a Serbian and Yugoslav rock band formed in Belgrade in 1987.

Originally a nine-piece band, Vampiri gained the attention of the Yugoslav public at the beginning of 1990s with their doo-wop and rockabilly sound. Their debut album Rama lama ding dong was released in 1991 and brought them huge popularity among the country's teen audience. The group repeated the success of their debut with the albums Tačno u ponoć (1991) and Be-be (1993), the latter featuring the band's songs written for the hit film We Are Not Angels. However, in 1994, part of the members left to form the supergroup Familija, leaving vocalist Aleksandar Eraković as the sole remaining original member. The band continued as a five-piece, recording the albums Plavi grad (1995) and Monkey Food (1997), the latter marked by the group's departure from their original sound and experimentation with different genres, disbanding in 1998. In 2012, Eraković reformed Vampiri, the group releasing their first album since the 1990s, Letimo, in 2022.

== History ==
=== Band formation (1987–1990) ===
Vampiri were formed in 1987, but, due to several hiatuses caused by the members' mandatory stints in the Yugoslav army, did not manage to get the attention of the public until 1990. The band, consisting of Aleksandar Eraković "Era" (vocals), Dejan Pejović "Peja" (vocals), Dejan Petrović "Dexy" (backing vocals), Dušan Varda "Duća" (backing vocals), Dušan Pavlović "Lude" (guitar), Dejan Jovanović (bass guitar) and Goran Redžepi "Redža" (drums), attracted the attention of the public with their 1950s-influenced doo-wop sound. Previously, Eraković, Pejović, and Pavlović had attended the Belgrade School for Industrial Design together, which is where they met. The group was soon joined by Borivoje Borac "Borko" (saxophone) and Dejan Tomović "Tomke" (keyboards).

=== Mainstream success (1991–1995) ===
Among the band's early recordings was the song "Rama lama ding dong", a Serbo-Croatian language cover of the song by The Edsels. In June 1990, a promotional video was made for the song, shot partially on the roof of the cinema 20 October and partially at the Kalemegdan Fortress in Belgrade. The video was broadcast by the national television, making it an immediate hit. Soon, the band's songs "Lea", "Anđela" and "Malena" ("Little Girl"), produced by Saša Habić, started being regularly broadcast on Yugoslav radio stations and provided the band with a contract with PGP-RTB record label.

The band's debut album Rama lama ding dong was released in 1991. Guitarist Branko Potonjak, keyboardist Sloba Marković and saxophone player Jova Maljoković made guest appearances on the album. Rama lama ding dong brought a number of well-received tracks, like the new version of the title track, "Malena", "Hajde, hajde" ("Come On, Come On"), "Ove noći" ("This Night"), "Sve što želim to samo sni" ("All I Want Are the Dreams") and "San letnje noći" ("A Midsummer Night's Dream"), the latter being a cover of "Little Orphan Girl" by Carlo Mastrangelo. With simple doo-wop songs the band soon gained large popularity among the country's teen audience. Following the album release, in the spring of 1991, Vampiri appeared at the Belgrade Spring festival, during the evening featuring prominent artists performing songs which had won the first place on earlier editions of the festival. Vampiri performed a cover of Đorđe Marjanović's song "Beograde" ("(Oh,) Belgrade"), and their version was included on the festival's 1991 official compilation album. During the same year, the band members recorded backing vocals for the album Lovac na novac (Money Hunter) by punkabilly singer Toni Montano. The band's first major live appearance was as an opening act on the Vaya Con Dios concert in Belgrade's Sava Centar in June 1991. With the song "Meni njena ljubav treba" ("I Need Her Love") they won the first place at the 1991 MESAM festival, also winning the Discovery of the Year Award.

By the end of the year, the band released their second album Tačno u ponoć (High Midnight), which brought the sound similar to the one on the debut. The album was produced by Oliver Jovanović and included a cover of Jerry Landis song "Lone Ranger", entitled "Usamljeni rendžer". In May 1992, Vampiri performed at the students' protests against the regime of Slobodan Milošević, and for the occasion the band performed a cover version of Zdravko Čolić song "Glavo luda" ("Crazy Head"), and during the summer of the same year, the group went on a joint tour with Neverne Bebe. At the time, former Graffiti member Dragan Novaković became the new bassist, replacing Dejan Jovanović, and, by the end of 1992, Saša Petrov became the new guitarist, making the band a ten-piece. In March 1992, the band performed at the last Jugovizija festival (Yugoslavian selection for the Eurovision Song Contest) with the song "Ding ding dong", winning the second place. At the time, the band also recorded the music for the film We Are Not Angels by Srđan Dragojević. Four songs recorded for the film were released in 1993 on the band's third studio album Be-be (Ba-bies). The title track lyrics were written by Srđan Dragojević, and "Poziv na ples" ("Dance Invitation") was a cover version of the Beatles song "I Saw Her Standing There".

In 1994, Pejović, Petrović and Redžepi formed the supergroup Familija with former members of U Škripcu, the original incarnation of Vampiri thus ending their activity. Vampiri continued in the lineup featuring only Eraković, Tomović, Petrov, Novaković and the new drummer Srđan Milenković. The new lineup recorded the album Plavi grad (Blue City), released in 1995. The album featured hits "Plavi grad", "Neću" ("I Won't"), "Stari voz" ("Old Train") and "Ona i ja" ("She and I"), the latter a cover of The Searchers' "Needles and Pins").

=== Change of style and disbandment (1997–1998) ===
In 1997, the band released the album Monkey Food, produced by Saša Habić, moving towards more diverse style of rock. The album was recorded by the new lineup, featuring Eraković, Tomović, Petrov, Jožef Pilasanović (formerly of Toni Montano's backing band, guitar), Saša Filčić (formerly of Špijuni, bass guitar) and Srđan Jovanović (formerly of Oktobar 1864 and Psihopolis, drums). The album, featuring a painting by Matisse on the cover, brought more experimental sound with the title track, which was a cover of Spencer Davis Group song "I'm a Man", "Dan" ("Day"), "Spejs Džeronimo" ("Space Geronimo") and "Sedmi deo" ("Seventh Part"), the latter featuring Kornelije Kovač as guest keyboardist. "Svoj" ("My Own") featured guest appearance by Jovan Maljoković on saxophone, and "Budi se" ("Wake Up") featured guitarist Saša Petrov on lead vocals. After the album release, Vampiri disbanded.

=== Post breakup ===
After Vampiri disbanded, Eraković founded the Rama Lama Studio in Belgrade, and, in 2005, formed the Beatles tribute band The Bestbeat.

Dejan Pejović and Dejan Petrović recorded two highly successful albums with Familija, before the group disbanded in 1998. After the band split up, Pejović formed The Dibidus, which was in 2007 joined by another former Vampiri member, Saša Petrov. Petrović recorded the 2000 album Putešestvije (Journey) with the band Centrala. Redžepi recorded only one album with Familija, leaving the band in 1995. In 2000, he released the solo album with self-ironic title Kad budem mršav i beo (When I'm Skinny and White). He died on 2 January 2019.

The band's original guitarist Dušan Pavlović received his PhD in 2002 from the Central European University in Budapest in the field of political philosophy and theory. Since 2005, he has taught at the Faculty of Political Sciences at the University of Belgrade. He was a columnist for the newspaper Politika and one of the forming members of the political movement Enough is Enough, and in 2016 he became a deputy in the National Assembly of Serbia.

=== Reformation (2012–present) ===
In 2012, Eraković reformed Vampiri. Beside Eraković and Dejan Tomović, the band featured new members, Marko Ćalić (bass guitar) and Damjan Dašić (drums and backing vocals), both Eraković's bandmates in their Beatles tribute act The Bestbeat, Dašić's younger brother Nemanja (guitar) and Andreja Bućan (saxophone and backing vocals). On January 10, the band held their first concert since the reformation, in Negotin, and on February 11 they held a concert in Belgrade's Sava Centar. The Belgrade concert featured numerous guests: Toni Montano, Plavi Orkestar frontman Saša Lošić, and actors Uroš Đurić and Srđan Todorović (who both starred in We Are Not Angels). As a tribute to late Milan Delčić "Delča", on the concert Vampiri performed U Škripcu song "Koliko imaš godina" ("How Old Are You").

In December 2013, the band released the single and music video "Put za pravi put" ("The Road to the Right Road"), announcing their upcoming studio album. Simultaneously, Eraković formed the cover band Neon Kings. During the following years, Vampiri's work on new recordings were prolonged by lineup changes and COVID-19 pandemic. In 2022, the band finally released their first album since the 1990s, Letimo (We're Flying). By the time of the album completion, the group consisted of Eraković, Arsenije Tubić (guitar), Nikola Sarić (bass guitar), Nikola Nemešević (keyboards), Andreja Bućan (saxophone) and Miloš Šikman (drums). The album featured guest appearances by Saša Sedlar, on bass guitar, drums and keyboards, and the band's former guitarist Jožef Pilasanović, who had moved to Canada after Vampiri disbanded in late 1990s. Alongside new songs, the album featured a new version of "Sedmi deo", entitled "Sedmi deo u A duru" ("Seventh Part in A Major").

In 2025, Vamipiri took part in Pesma za Evroviziju '25, Serbian selection for the Eurovision Song Contest, 33 years after participating in the last Yugoslavian selection, with the song "Tebi treba neko kao ja" ("You Need Someone Like Me"), failing to qualify for the finals.

== Discography ==
=== Studio albums ===
- Rama lama ding dong (1991)
- Tačno u ponoć (1991)
- Be-be (1993)
- Plavi grad (1995)
- Monkey Food (1998)
- Letimo (2022)

=== Other appearances ===
- "Beograde" (Hitovi Beogradskog proleća, 1991)
