= Milan Delčić =

Serbian and Yugoslav musician

- Born: 19 November 1960; Pirot, PR Serbia, FPR Yugoslavia
- Died: 24 July 2011 (aged 50); Belgrade, Serbia
- Other name: Delča
- Occupations: Singer; songwriter; playwright; dramaturge; actor; television host
- Years active: 1980–2011
- Musical career
- Genres: New wave; art rock; post-punk; synth-pop; pop rock; power pop; electro
- Instruments: Vocals; guitar
- Labels: Jugoton; PGP-RTB; PGP-RTS; ITMM; Mascom
- Formerly of: U Škripcu

Milan Delčić "Delča" (Serbian Cyrillic: Милан Делчић Делча, 19 November 1960 – 24 July 2011) was a Serbian and Yugoslav musician, playwright, dramaturge and television host, best known for his career as the frontman of the rock band U Škripcu and as a solo artist.

Delčić gained prominence in the early 1980s as the frontman of the new wave band U Škripcu, the group achieving nationwide popularity with their third and second album, heavily influenced by New Romanticism. Delčić recorded five studio albums with U Škripcu. After the group disbanded in 1991, Delčić started his solo career, releasing three studio albums.

A graduate from University of Belgrade Faculty of Dramatic Arts department of dramaturgy, Delčić authored several theatre plays and worked on production of several television series. In addition, he worked as a TV host and had minor roles in several films.

He died in 2011, after long battle with leukemia.

== Biography ==
=== Musical career ===
==== U Škripcu (1980–1991) ====
Born in Pirot on 11 November 1960, Delčić started his musical career in 1980 as the frontman of the Belgrade new wave band U Škripcu (trans. In Dire Straits). The group was formed by Delčić (vocals, guitar for a brief period of time), Aleksandar Vasiljević "Vasa" (guitar) and Zoran Vulović "Vule" (keyboards). At the time of the formation, the band was a part of the Yugoslav new wave scene, attracting the attention of the public with their artistic live performances and their appearance on the 1981 various artists compilation album Artistička radna akcija. With the release of their 1982 debut album Godine ljubavi (Years of Love), the band moved towards a more experimental post-punk sound, before achieving nationwide commercial success with the release of the 1983 album O je! (Oh, Yeah!) and mini album Nove godine! (New Years!), both influenced by New Romanticism. The original lineup recorded one more album, the 1984 synth-pop-oriented Budimo zajedno! (Let's Be Together!), which failed to repeat the commercial success of its predecessors, causing the group to disband in 1985. In 1986, Vulović and Delčić reformed the band, but the latter soon left, so the new lineup, with vocalist Aleksandar Tabaš, recorded the fourth studio album U Škripcu (1987), the group's only studio album not to feature Delčić on vocals. The album was not commercially successful and the group disbanded once again. In 1989, Delčić, Vulović, Vasiljević and Lukić reunited, recording the critically acclaimed fifth studio album Izgleda da mi smo sami (It Looks like We're Alone), after which the band, although not officially announcing their disbandment, ended their activity with the outbreak of Yugoslav Wars. During the following years, they would reunite for major events only, like their performance at the 1996–1997 protests. During his stint with U Škripcu, Delčić appeared as guest on the 1984 album U zemlji čuda (In Wonderland) by the girl group Šizike (Crazy Girls), recording lead vocals for the song "Nebo zove" ("The Sky Is Calling").

==== Solo career (1994–2011) ====
Delčić started his solo career in early 1990s, forming his backing band Sklekovi (The Push-Ups). The first lineup of Sklekovi consisted of Jožef Pilasanović (guitar), Nebojša Zulfikarpašić "Keba" (keyboards), Predrag Milanović (bass guitar) and Ratko Ljubičić (drums). In 1994, Delčić and his band released the album Delča i Sklekovi. The album tracks were authored by Delčić and by his former U Škripcu mandmate Zoran Vulović, and the album also included a cover of Đorđe Marjanović song "Da da dadirla da", which was itself a cover of a song by Greek singer Dionysis Savvopoulos. The album brought hit songs "Vozovi" ("Trains") and "Hajde polako" ("Come On Slowly"). Following the album release, Delčić, with the backing band Extazi, performed on an unplugged festival held in Belgrade's Sava Centar, the recording of their version of U Škripcu song "Koliko imaš godina" ("How Old Are You") appearing on the 1996 various artists live album Bez struje (Unplugged), recorded on the festival. In 1996, Delčić appeared on the Budva Music Festival with the song "Leto vole kupačice" ("Bathing Girls Love Summer"), which was released on the festival's official compilation album.

In 1997, Delčić released the album S jezikom u usta (With Tongues in Each Other's Mouth). The album tracks featured diverse sound, from rock and pop to funk and electro. The album included a new version of old U Škripcu hit "Nove godine", entitled "Volkswagen Blau" and sung in a made-up language resembling German. The following year, Delča i Sklekovi appeared once again on Budva Music Festival, with the song "Pomdmornica" ("Submarine"), the song appearing on festival's official compilation. In 2000, prior to the Yugoslavian general election, Delčić wrote the activist song "Vreme je!" ("It's Time!"), recording it with a group of musicians and actors.

In 2003, Delčić released his third and last solo album, entitled Krenuo sam davno, ne sećam se gde (I Started My Journey Long Time Ago, I Can't Remember Where To). Delčić recorded the album with Nebojša Zulfikarpašić, Ratko Ljubičić, Vlada Novičić (bass guitar) and Maja Klisinski (percussion). During the same year, he took part in the Beovizija 2003 festival with the song "Anđeli" ("Angels"). On 10 March 2006, Delčić, backed by Sklekovi and with guest appearances by his former U Škripcu bandmates, held a concert in Belgrade Youth Center. The concert was released in 2008 on the live album (20-Something Anniversary) under the moniker Delča a i U Škripcu (Delča and also U Škripcu).

=== Career as playwright and dramaturge ===
Delčić graduated from Belgrade Faculty of Dramatic Arts' department of dramaturgy in 1984. He authored several theatre plays:

- Hari ne putuje vozom (Harry Doesn't Travel by Train), staged in Belgrade's Students' Cultural Center in 1984,
- Kraljevo blago (King's Treasure), staged in Atelje 212 theatre in 1986,
- Transex Hardcore One Man Show, staged in Bitef theatre in 1992,
- Radmilo Gnusni and Radmila Pogana (Radmilo the Hideous and Radmila the Foul), staged in Bitef theatre in 1992.

Delčić also wrote the segment "Lepe, čiste, dobre" ("Pretty Ones, Pure Ones, Good Ones") for the omnibus play Beogradske priče (Belgrade Stories), directing it himself. He worked as dramaturge on the production of TV series Dome slatki dome (Home Sweet Home) and U ime zakona (In the Name of the Law).

=== Career in television ===
Together with musician Vladimir Đurić "Đura", Delčić hosted the show Kult detektivi (Cult Detectives) on Serbian television station Art. On the same television, Delčić hosted the late night show Kabinet doktora Mrmora (Cabinet of Doctor Murmur). The show resulted in his book Doktor psepsy Maksimilijan Mrmor i njegovi pacijenti (Dr Psepsy Maximilian Murmur and His Patients), published in 2001. For a period of time, Delčić worked as a music editor on television YU Info.

=== Other activities ===
Delčić played minor roles in Miroslav Lekić's 1987 film It Happened on This Very Day, in Vladimir Živković's 1994 film Slatko od snova (Slatko Made of Dreams), in Srđan Koljević's 2004 film The Red Colored Grey Truck, and in the TV series Otvorena vrata (Open Doors).

== Death and tributes ==
Delčić died in Belgrade on 24 July 2011, after long battle with leukemia.

In 2012, Croatian singer Massimo Savić performed U Škripcu song "Siđi do reke" ("Come Down to the River"), as a tribute to Delčić, on his concert at Belgrade's Sava Centar. In 2012, Serbian band Vampiri covered the song "Koliko imaš godina" on their concert in Sava Centar as a tribute to Delčić.

In September 2013, a commemorative plaque in memory of Delčić was unveiled on the house in which he lived in Belgrade neighborhood of Košutnjak. During the same year, the commemorative festival Dan D (D Day) was initiated, with the goal of promoting young bands and authors.

== Legacy ==
Delčić's song "Hajde polako" was covered by Serbian band Bane Lalić & MVP in 2013.

In 2006, U Škripcu song "Siđi do reke" was ranked No. 71 on the B92 Top 100 Domestic Songs list. In 2011, the band's song "Izgleda da mi smo sami" was polled, by the listeners of Radio 202, one of 60 greatest songs released by PGP-RTB/PGP-RTS during the sixty years of the label's existence.

The lyrics of U Škripcu song "Šuma" ("Forest"), authored by Delčić, are featured in Petar Janjatović's book Pesme bratstva, detinjstva & potomstva: Antologija ex YU rok poezije 1967 - 2007 (Songs of Brotherhood, Childhood & Offspring: Anthology of Ex YU Rock Poetry 1967 – 2007).

== Discography ==
=== With U Škripcu ===
==== Studio albums ====
- Godine ljubavi (1982)
- O je! (1983)
- Nove godine! (1983)
- Budimo zajedno! (1984)
- Izgleda da mi smo sami (1990)

==== Live albums ====
- Jubilarnih 20 i nešto godina (as Delča a i U Škripcu; 2008)

==== Compilation albums ====
- Greatest Hits Collection (2019)

==== Singles ====
- "Nove godine" / "Beograd spava" (1983)
- "Uzmi sve što želiš, crni anđele" / "Baj, baj" (1987)

==== Other appearances ====
- "Pamflex dom" / "Južno voće" (Artistička radna akcija; 1981)
- "Stjuardesa" (Beograde; 1991)

=== Solo ===
==== Studio albums ====
- Delča i Sklekovi (1994)
- S jezikom u usta (1997)
- Krenuo sam davno, ne sećam se gde (2003)

==== Other appearances ====
- "Koliko imaš godina" (Bez struje; 1996)
- "Leto vole kupačice" (Budva '96.; 1996)
- "Podmornica" (Budva '98; 1988)
- "Anđeli" (Beovizija 2003 – 1; 2003)

== Bibliography ==
- Doktor psepsy Maksimilijan Mrmot i njegovi pacijenti (2001)
