= Marko Milivojević =

Serbian musician

Marko Milivojević is a Serbian musician. He played drums and keyboards in various Yugoslav bands as Morbidi, U Škripcu, Partibrejkers, Električni Orgazam, Old Stars Band, E-Play etc., and is known as the last drummer of the Serbian rock band Ekatarina Velika. He's been playing as part of Marčelo's Shock Orchestra as well as Vlada Divljan's accompanying band (Ne)Vladina organizacija. Lately he worked with Lena Kovačević on her debut album featuring Boban Marković Orchestra and Dejan "Mozart" Kostić.
