= Andrej Mitrović =

Serbian historian (1937–2013)

- Born: Андреј Митровић; 17 April 1937; Kragujevac, Kingdom of Yugoslavia
- Died: 25 August 2013 (aged 76); Belgrade, Serbia
- Spouse: Ljubinka Trgovčević

Academic background
- Education: Faculty of Philosophy; University of Belgrade; (PhD)
- Thesis: Delegation of Serbs, Croats, and Slovenes at the 1919–1920 Peace Conference (1967)

Academic work
- Discipline: History
- Institutions: University of Belgrade
- Main interests: modern history; historiography; social history; economic history; history of political thought; cultural history
- Notable works: Time of the Intolerant (1974); Serbia's Great War (2005)

Andrej Mitrović (Serbian Cyrillic: Андреј Митровић; 17 April 1937 – 25 August 2013) was a Serbian historian, professor and author. A specialist of the contemporary history of Serbia and Yugoslavia, he served as the head of the Contemporary History Department at the Faculty of Philosophy, University of Belgrade. Mitrović wrote extensively on the First World War, the Paris Peace Conference, interwar Europe as well as on economic, social, cultural history and historiography.

As one of the leading Yugoslav and Serbian historians of the 20th century, Mitrović often challenged his country's historical narratives and was openly critical of Serbian nationalism in the late 1980s and early 1990s. He was a corresponding member of the Serbian Academy of Science and Arts, a member of the Montenegrin Academy of Sciences and Arts, and the recipient of several prestigious awards.

== Early life and education ==
Andrej Mitrović was born in Kragujevac, Kingdom of Yugoslavia, where he completed elementary and secondary school. In 1961 Mitrović graduated in history from the Faculty of Philosophy, University of Belgrade, earning his master's degree in 1964 with the thesis "April negotiations on the Adriatic question at the Peace Conference in 1919" and his doctorate in 1967 with the thesis "Delegation of Serbs, Croats and Slovenes at the 1919–1920 Peace Conference".

== Academic career ==
Mitrović became faculty assistant in 1961, assistant professor in 1967, associate professor in 1974; that year he published Time of the Intolerant: A Political History of Europe's Great Powers, 1919–1939, his award-winning book about the interwar growing ideological divisions and the intolerance that resulted from it.

In 1980 he accepted a position at the Faculty of Philosophy in Belgrade, where he taught contemporary European history, introduction to historical studies and numerous specialised courses; in 1987 he became the head of the department of Modern History. In 1988 he became a corresponding fellow of the Serbian Academy of Sciences and Arts, spending research years in Italy and West Germany. Mitrović published the first comprehensive theory of historical studies in Serbian historiography after assimilating the concept of total history developed by the Bielefeld School; Mitrović’s version included politics, economy, society and culture bringing new perspectives in historical writing, a concept which his students then started applying in their own research.

Mitrović studied the place of Yugoslavia in European politics between the two world wars and is the author of books and articles about Serbia’s involvement in the First World War, as well as on the economic, social, and cultural, history of the Balkans within the European framework. According to John Lampe, Mitrović's Serbia's Great War, 1914–1918 (2005), his only volume to be republished in English, is widely regarded as a major contribution to the topic of Serbia and its role in WWI and is being studied in western scholarship. The first edition was greeted in scholarly circles as a "scrupulously written magnum opus".

== Activism ==
Starting in the late 1980s Mitrović was outspoken about the abuse of history and the revision of facts for political purposes, using his scholarship as a platform for critique and activism. In the 1990s he was a vocal critic of the regime of Slobodan Milošević, opposing growing nationalism and advocating for a modern European-oriented Serbia. Some of his speeches were published by the Belgrade Circle in a book entitled Druga Srbija (Other Serbia). (Note: Other Serbia became during the 1990s, a term to designate intellectuals who were anti-war and opposed to Serbian nationalism.) Together with his wife, Ljubinka Trgovčević, he utilised his academic background to engage in public discourse, writing essays, giving lectures, and participating in every protest against the war.

In 1991 they published an historian's proclamation against the shelling of Dubrovnik; that same year he published a book in which he warned against the effects of what he called parahistory, a type of historical revisionism featuring the distortion of selected sources to indict one side or another. In April 1999 with a number of prominent Serbian intellectual, he was a signatory of "A plea for peace from Belgrade". According to German Historian Alexander Korb, as a consequence of his positions that stood out from most Serbian professional and academic circles, Mitrović was never promoted to full member of the Serbian Academy.

== Awards ==
- 1975 City of Belgrade October Award
- 2001 Herder Prize by the University of Vienna and the Alfred Toepfer Foundation of Hamburg
- 2004 Konstantin Jireček Award by Germany's Southeast European Association

== Personal life ==
Andrej Mitrović was married to fellow historian Ljubinka Trgovčević. He died on 25 August 2013 in Belgrade.

== Selected works ==
During his lifetime Mitrović published 25 books and approximately 400 articles.

=== Books ===
- Yugoslavia at the 1919–1920 Peace Conference (1969, Zavod za izdavanje udžbenika)
- Time of the Intolerant: Political History of Europe's Great States 1919–1939 (Belgrade 1974)
- Demarcation of Yugoslavia with Hungary and Romania: A Contribution to the Study of Yugoslav Politics at the Peace Conference in Paris (Novi Sad 1975)
- Historical in "The Magic Mountain" (1977)
- Penetrating the Balkans: Serbia in the Plans of Austria-Hungary and Germany 1908–1918. (1981)
- Engaged and Beautiful (1983)
- Serbia in the First World War (1984)
- Insurgent Struggles in Serbia 1916–1918 (1987)
- Arguments with Clio (1991)
- The Toplica Uprising (1993)
- On God's State and Evil Salvation (2007)
- Culture and History (2008)
- Serbia's Great War 1914–1918 (2007, Purdue University Press)
