= Serbia in the Eurovision Song Contest 2024 =

- Eurovision Song Contest 2024
- Participating broadcaster: Radio Television of Serbia (RTS)
- Country: Serbia
- Selection process: Pesma za Evroviziju '24
- Selection date: 2 March 2024

Competing entry
- Song: "Ramonda"
- Artist: Teya Dora
- Songwriters: Andrijano Kadović; Luka Jovanović; Teodora Pavlovska

Placement
- Semi-final result: Qualified (10th, 47 points)
- Final result: 17th, 54 points

Participation chronology

Serbia was represented at the Eurovision Song Contest 2024 with the song "Ramonda", performed by Teya Dora and written by Teya Dora along with Andrijano Kadović and Luka Jovanović. The Serbian participating broadcaster, Radio Television of Serbia (RTS), organised the national final Pesma za Evroviziju '24 in order to select its entry for the contest.

Serbia was drawn to compete in the first semi-final of the Eurovision Song Contest which took place on 7 May 2024 and was later selected to perform in position 2. At the end of the show, "Ramonda" was announced among the top 10 entries of the first semi-final and hence qualified to compete in the final. It was later revealed that Serbia placed tenth out of the fifteen participating countries in the semi-final with 47 points. In the final, Serbia performed in position 16 and placed seventeenth out of the 25 performing countries, scoring a total of 54 points.

== Background ==
Prior to the 2024 contest, Radio Television of Serbia (RTS) had participated in the Eurovision Song Contest representing Serbia fifteen times since its first entry in 2007, winning the contest with its debut entry "Molitva" performed by Marija Šerifović. Since then, 12 out of the 15 total Serbian entries had featured in the final with RTS failing to qualify in 2009, 2013, and 2017. Serbian 2023 entry, "Samo mi se spava" performed by Luke Black, qualified to the final and placed 24th.

As part of its duties as participating broadcaster, RTS organises the selection of its entry in the Eurovision Song Contest and broadcasts the event in the country. The broadcaster had used both internal selections and national finals to determine its entries throughout the years. Between 2007 and 2009, RTS used the Beovizija national final, but after its 2009 entry failed to qualify Serbia to the final, the broadcaster shifted its selection strategy to selecting specific composers to create songs for artists. After a successful internal selection in 2012, in 2013 RTS returned to an open national final format, titled Beosong, but it failed to qualify to the final. After reverting to internal selection in 2016 and 2017, it returned to use the Beovizija national final in 2018 and 2019, managing to qualify to the final on both occasions. In 2022, RTS returned to organising a national final under the name Pesma za Evroviziju, a format which was re-confirmed in 2023.

On 13 July 2023, RTS confirmed its participation in the 2024 contest, announcing the organisation of a national final in order to select its entry. This was later confirmed to be Pesma za Evroviziju for a third time.

== Before Eurovision ==
=== Pesma za Evroviziju '24 ===
The third edition of Pesma za Evroviziju, the Serbian national final for the Eurovision Song Contest, took place between 27 February and 2 March 2024 among 28 competing entries.

==== Semi-finals ====
- The first semi-final took place on 27 February 2024. "Bedem" performed by Hristina, "Zovi me Lena" performed by Lena Kovačević, "Percepcija" performed by M.IRA, "No No No" performed by Bojana and David, "Gnezdo orlovo" performed by Breskvica, "Dno" performed by Marko Mandić, "Dijamanti" performed by Keni nije mrtav and "Lik u ogledalu" performed by Zorja advanced to the final, while "Elektroljubav" performed by Saša Baša and Virtual Ritual, "Da me voliš" performed by Martina Vrbos, "Ko je ta žena?" performed by Filarri, "Jaka" performed by Ivana Vladović, "Sama" performed by Chai and "Vavilon" performed by Kavala were eliminated from the contest.
- The second semi-final took place on 29 February 2024. "Dom" performed by Iva Lorens, "Novo, bolje" performed by Konstrakta, "Zbog tebe živim" performed by Dušan Kurtić, "Najbolja" performed by Zejna, "Ramonda" performed by Teya Dora, "Moje tvoje" performed by Milan Bujaković, "Jutra bez tebe" performed by Nemanja Radošević and "Luna park" performed by Džordži advanced to the final, while "Sudari" performed by Nadia, "Nemoguća misija" performed by Hydrogen, "Duga je noć" performed by Filip Baloš, "Kolo" performed by Yanx, "Tajni začin" performed by Kat Dosa and "Muzika" performed by Durlanski were eliminated from the contest.

==== Final ====
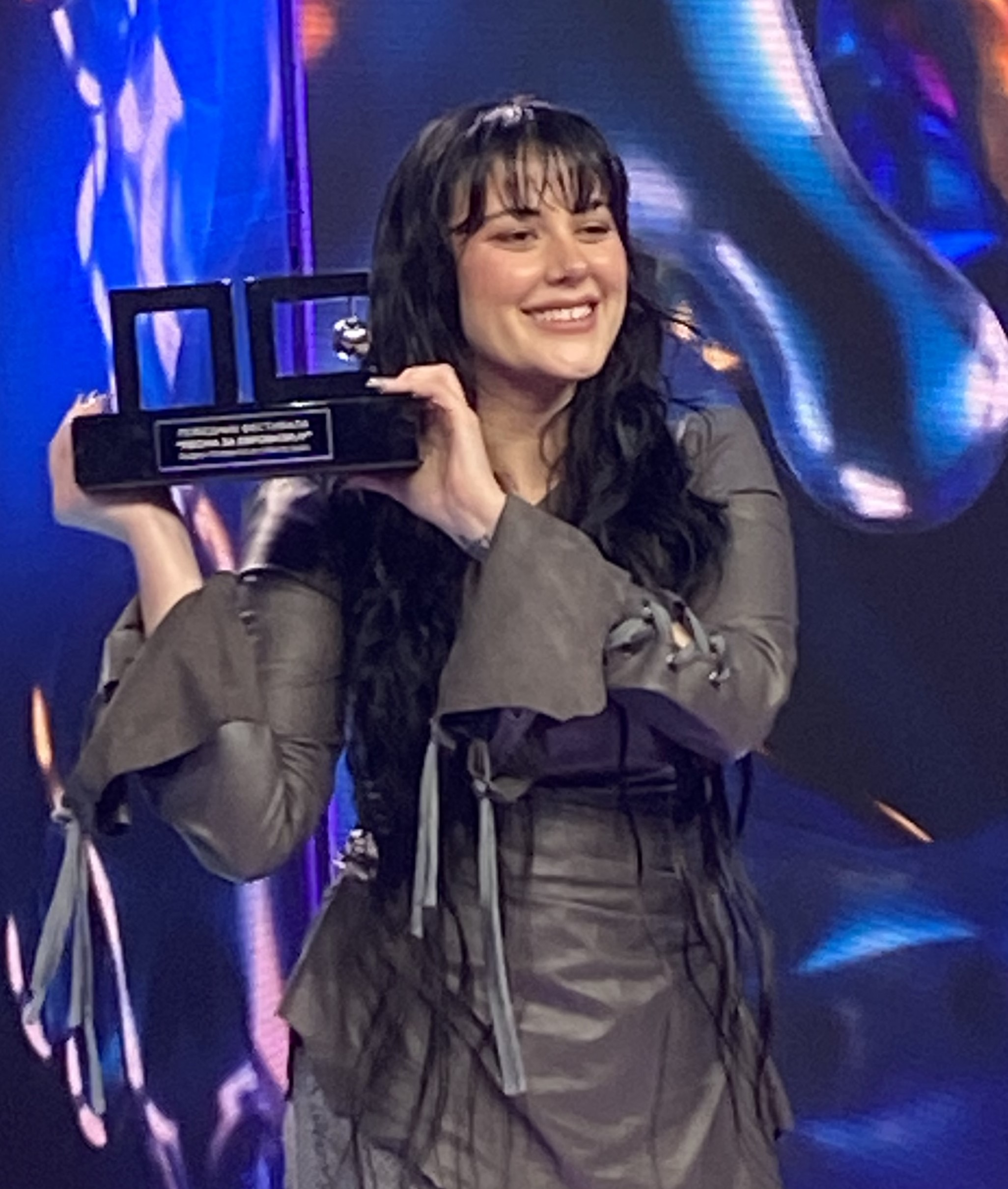
Teya Dora, the winner of Pesma za Evroviziju '24, posing for the reporters following her win

The final took place on 2 March 2024. The winner was selected based on the 50/50 combination of votes from five jurors and from a public televote. The winner was "Ramonda" written by Teodora Pavlovska (Teya Dora), Luka Jovanović and Andrijano Kadović, and performed by Teya Dora.

Final – 2 March 2024
R/O	Artist	Song	Jury	Televote	Total	Place
1	Iva Lorens	"Dom"	2	0	2	12
2	Džordži	"Luna park"	1	5	6	8
3	Breskvica	"Gnezdo orlovo"	5	12	17	2
4	Teya Dora	"Ramonda"	12	10	22	1
5	Hristina	"Bedem"	3	0	3	10
6	Marko Mandić	"Dno"	0	0	0	15
7	M.IRA	"Percepcija"	0	1	1	13
8	Nemanja Radošević	"Jutra bez tebe"	0	0	0	14
9	Milan Bujaković	"Moje tvoje"	0	0	0	16
10	Keni nije mrtav	"Dijamanti"	0	2	2	11
11	Zorja	"Lik u ogledalu"	10	7	17	3
12	Zejna	"Najbolja"	7	4	11	5
13	Konstrakta	"Novo, bolje"	8	8	16	4
14	Bojana and David	"No No No"	0	6	6	7
15	Lena Kovačević	"Zovi me Lena"	6	0	6	9
16	Dušan Kurtić	"Zbog tebe živim"	4	3	7	6

=== Promotion ===
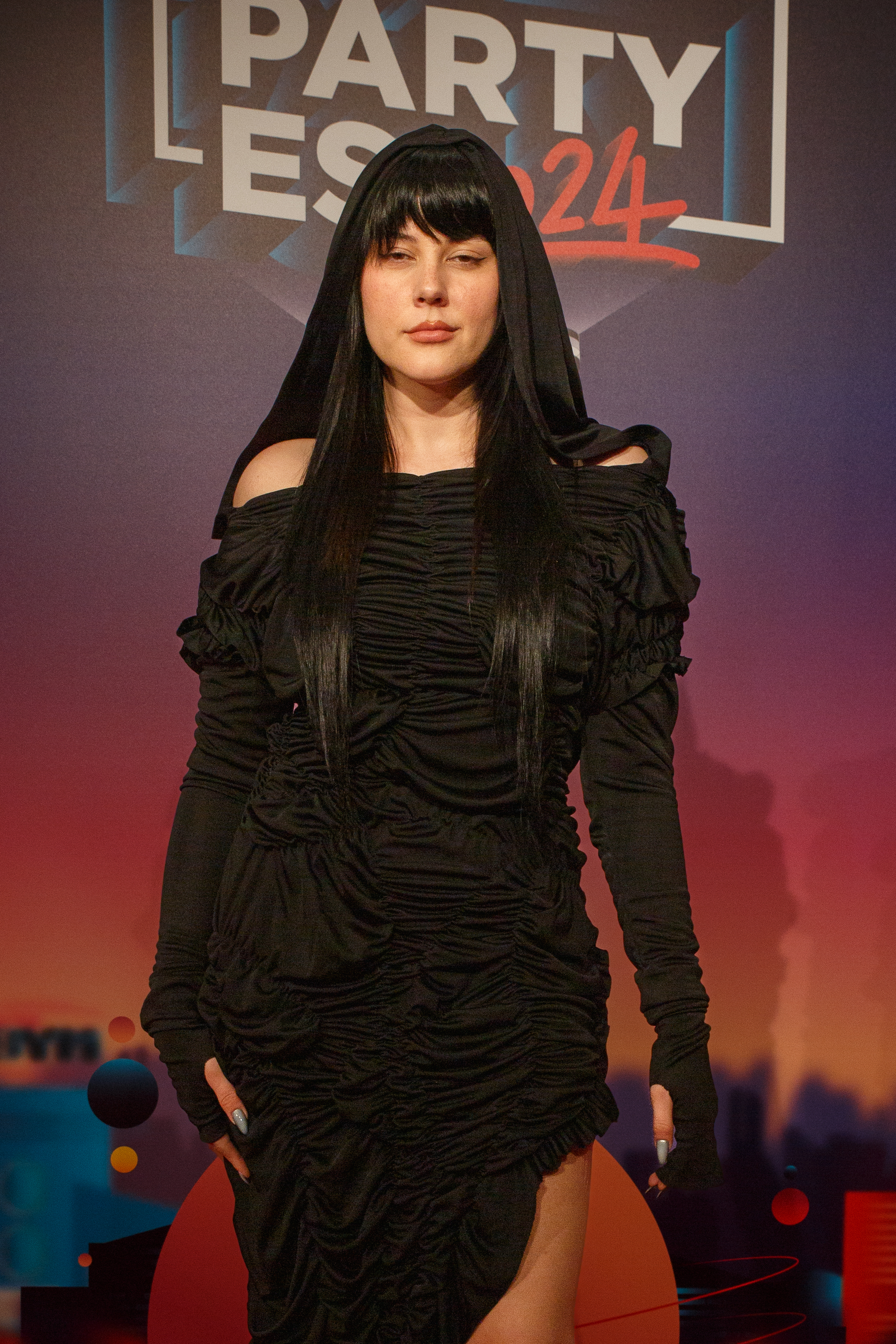
Teya Dora at the PrePartyES event in Madrid

As part of the promotion of her participation in the contest, Teya Dora attended the PrePartyES in Madrid on 30 March 2024, the Barcelona Eurovision Party on 6 April 2024, the Eurovision in Concert event in Amsterdam on 13 April 2024 and the Copenhagen Eurovision Party (Malmöhagen) on 4 May 2024. On 1 May, Teya Dora took part in her birthday party organised by the Serbian and Croatian delegations and open to press and fans. In addition, she performed at the Eurovision Village in Malmö on 8 May 2024. A day prior to the first semi-final, RTS aired a documentary on Teya Dora's life, career and Eurovision journey, titled Stazama Ramonde (transl. "Walking the path of 'Ramonda'").

=== Send-off ceremony ===
In April 24, RTS held a ceremonial farewell for the Serbian representative to the Eurovision Song Contest 2024. The ceremony was attended by numerous guests, including the Swedish ambassador to Serbia Annika Ben David, the editor in chief of RTS' entertainment program Sandra Perović and the director of RTS Dragan Bujošević, as well as members of OGAE Serbia, fans of the competition, journalists and others. At the ceremony, Teya Dora was given the flag of Sweden by the Swedish ambassador and was handed over the flag of Serbia by Luke Black, who represented Serbia in 2023.

== At Eurovision ==
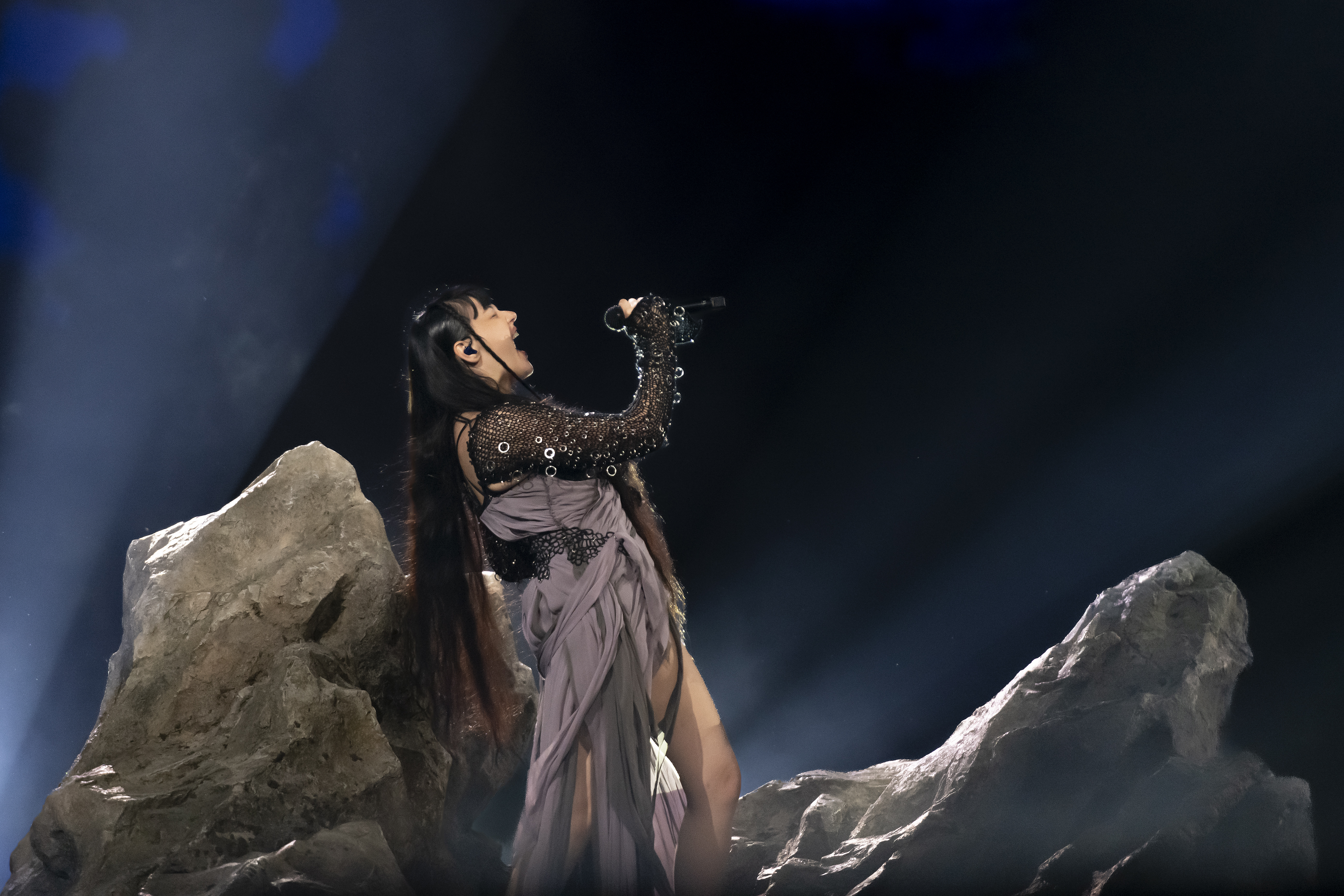
Teya Dora during a rehearsal before the first semi-final.

The Eurovision Song Contest 2024 took place at the Malmö Arena in Malmö, Sweden, and consisted of two semi-finals held on the respective dates of 7 and 9 May and the final on 11 May 2024. All nations with the exceptions of the host country and the "Big Five" (France, Germany, Italy, Spain and the United Kingdom) were required to qualify from one of two semi-finals in order to compete in the final; the top ten countries from each semi-final progressed to the final. On 30 January 2024, an allocation draw was held to determine which of the two semi-finals, as well as which half of the show, each country would perform in; the European Broadcasting Union (EBU) split up the competing countries into different pots based on voting patterns from previous contests, with countries with favourable voting histories put into the same pot. Serbia was scheduled for the first half of the first semi-final. The shows' producers then decided the running order for the semi-finals; Serbia was set to perform in position 2.

In Serbia, all the shows were broadcast on RTS 1, as well as internationally through RTS Svet, with commentary provided by Duška Vučinić. Radio Beograd 1 aired the first semi-final, with commentary by Katarina Epstein, and the final, with commentary by Katarina Epstein and Nikoleta Dojčinović. During the performance of Poland in the first semi-final, the broadcast was moved from RTS 1 to RTS 2 with no warning, so the former could air the arrival ceremony of General Secretary of the Chinese Communist Party (CCP) and Chairman of the Central Military Commission (CMC), and thus the paramount leader of China, Xi Jinping. RTS 2 aired approximately 25 minutes of the semi-final, including the remainder of the Polish entry, performances from Iceland, Croatia, and the first part of the German performance, before the broadcast was eventually restored to RTS 1.

=== Performance ===
Teya Dora took part in technical rehearsals on 27 April and 1 May, followed by dress rehearsals on 6 and 7 May. The staging of her performance of "Ramonda" at the contest featured blue lighting, smoke and a rock-shaped prop. The LED graphics were designed by Branko Tmušić, the performance's artistic director, whilst Milica Soldatović Mikić directed the performance.

=== Semi-final ===
Serbia performed in position 2, following the entry from Cyprus and before the entry from Lithuania. At the end of the show, the country was announced as a qualifier for the final. It was later revealed that Serbia placed tenth out of the fifteen participating countries in the first semi-final with 47 points.

=== Final ===
Following the semi-final, Serbia drew "producer's choice" for the final, meaning that the country will perform in the half decided by the contest's producers. Serbia performed in position 16, following the entry from Italy and before the entry from Finland. Teya Dora once again took part in dress rehearsals on 10 and 11 May before the final, including the jury final where the professional juries cast their final votes before the live show on 11 May. She performed a repeat of her semi-final performance during the final on 11 May. Serbia placed seventeenth in the final, scoring 54 points; 32 points from the public televoting and 22 points from the juries.

=== Voting ===
Below is a breakdown of points awarded by and to Serbia in the first semi-final and in the final. Voting during the three shows involved each country awarding sets of points from 1-8, 10 and 12: one from their professional jury and the other from televoting in the final vote, while the semi-final vote was based entirely on the vote of the public. The Serbian jury consisted of Alek Aleksov, Luke Black, who represented Serbia in the 2023 contest, Milovan Bošković, Lena Kovačević, and Zejna. In the first semi-final, Serbia placed 10th with 47 points, receiving maximum twelve points from Croatia and marking the country's sixth consecutive qualification to the final. In the final, Serbia placed 17th with 54 points, receiving twelve points in the televote from Croatia. Over the course of the contest, Serbia awarded its 12 points to Croatia in the first semi-final, and in both the jury vote and televote in the final.

RTS appointed Konstrakta, who represented Serbia in 2022, as its spokesperson to announce the Serbian jury's votes in the final.

==== Points awarded to Serbia ====
Points awarded to Serbia (Semi-final 1)
Score	Televote
12 points	Croatia
10 points	Slovenia
8 points	
7 points	
6 points	
5 points	Azerbaijan; Cyprus; Germany; Luxembourg
4 points	Rest of the World
3 points	
2 points	
1 point	Portugal

Points awarded to Serbia (Final)
Score	Televote	Jury
12 points	Croatia	
10 points		
8 points		
7 points		
6 points		
5 points	Austria; Slovenia; Switzerland	Armenia; Cyprus
4 points		Slovenia
3 points	Malta	Croatia
2 points	Albania	Denmark
1 point		Albania; Ireland; Portugal

==== Points awarded by Serbia ====
Points awarded by Serbia (Semi-final)
Score	Televote
12 points	Croatia
10 points	Slovenia
8 points	Luxembourg
7 points	Ireland
6 points	Ukraine
5 points	Portugal
4 points	Cyprus
3 points	Moldova
2 points	Lithuania
1 point	Azerbaijan

Points awarded by Serbia (Final)
Score	Televote	Jury
12 points	Croatia	Croatia
10 points	France	Switzerland
8 points	Greece	France
7 points	Ireland	Lithuania
6 points	Switzerland	Italy
5 points	Sweden	Sweden
4 points	Italy	United Kingdom
3 points	Israel	Greece
2 points	Slovenia	Ireland
1 point	Armenia	Ukraine

==== Detailed voting results ====
Each participating broadcaster assembles a five-member jury panel consisting of music industry professionals who are citizens of the country they represent. Each jury, and individual jury member, is required to meet a strict set of criteria regarding professional background, as well as diversity in gender and age. No member of a national jury was permitted to be related in any way to any of the competing acts in such a way that they cannot vote impartially and independently. The individual rankings of each jury member as well as the nation's televoting results were released shortly after the grand final.

The following members comprised the Serbian jury:

- Alek Aleksov
- Milovan Bošković
- Luka Ivanović (Luke Black)
- Lena Kovačević
- Zejna Murkić

Detailed voting results from Serbia (Semi-final 1)
R/O	Country	Televote	
R/O	Country	Rank	Points
01	Cyprus	7	4
02	Serbia		
03	Lithuania	9	2
04	Ireland	4	7
05	Ukraine	5	6
06	Poland	14	
07	Croatia	1	12
08	Iceland	13	
09	Slovenia	2	10
10	Finland	11	
11	Moldova	8	3
12	Azerbaijan	10	1
13	Australia	12	
14	Portugal	6	5
15	Luxembourg	3	8

Detailed voting results from Serbia (Final)
R/O	Country	Jury							Televote	
R/O	Country	Juror A	Juror B	Juror C	Juror D	Juror E	Rank	Points	Rank	Points
01	Sweden	9	3	14	7	11	7	5	6	5
02	Ukraine	16	25	24	4	6	11	1	11	
03	Germany	10	14	13	20	19	18		22	
04	Luxembourg	8	23	12	23	21	17		16	
~~05~~	~~Netherlands~~ ‡ (Note: The Netherlands was disqualified prior to the final.)	~~17~~	~~7~~	~~9~~	~~5~~	~~3~~	~~6~~		N/A	
06	Israel	23	16	25	25	25	24		8	3
07	Lithuania	4	11	11	3	7	4	7	19	
08	Spain	12	13	8	18	17	16		14	
09	Estonia	22	22	16	24	24	22		15	
10	Ireland	25	6	15	6	9	10	2	4	7
11	Latvia	19	15	18	14	20	21		23	
12	Greece	18	8	17	10	4	9	3	3	8
13	United Kingdom	13	10	3	8	10	8	4	24	
14	Norway	14	18	23	16	12	20		18	
15	Italy	11	4	5	11	5	5	6	7	4
16	Serbia									
17	Finland	20	12	19	12	16	19		17	
18	Portugal	6	20	6	13	14	12		20	
19	Armenia	15	9	7	15	15	14		10	1
20	Cyprus	7	21	10	17	13	15		13	
21	Switzerland	2	2	4	1	2	2	10	5	6
22	Slovenia	24	19	22	22	22	25		9	2
23	Croatia	1	1	2	2	1	1	12	1	12
24	Georgia	5	17	20	21	8	13		21	
25	France	3	5	1	9	18	3	8	2	10
26	Austria	21	24	21	19	23	23		12	

=== Ratings ===
In Serbia, a total of 1,860,832 people watched at least a minute of the final. An average of 837,678 people watched the final of the contest. The final recorded 37% audience share. The rating of the final was 13.4%.

The rating of Teya Dora's semi-final in Serbia was 8.5%, with the other semi-final recording a rating of 7.1%.
