= Ramonda =

Ramonda may refer to:

- Ramonda (fly), a subgenus in the family Tachinidae
- Ramonda (plant), a genus in the family Gesneriaceae
- Ramonda (character), stepmother of the Marvel Comics superhero Black Panther
- "Ramonda" (song), a 2024 song by Teya Dora
