= Marko Mandic =

Marko Mandic may refer to:

- Marko Mandić (footballer)
- Marko Mandić (singer)
- Marko Mandič (rower)
