= Pesma za Evroviziju '24 =

Serbian national selection for the Eurovision Song Contest 2024

Pesma za Evroviziju 2024

Dates and venue
- Semi-final 1: 27 February 2024
- Semi-final 2: 29 February 2024
- Final: 2 March 2024
- Venue: RTS Studio 8 Košutnjak, Belgrade, Serbia

Organisation
- Supervisor: Olivera Kovačević
- Broadcaster: Radio Television of Serbia (RTS)
- Presenters: Dragana Kosjerina; Slaven Došlo; Kristina Radenković; Stefan Popović

Participants
- Number of entries: 28
- Number of finalists: 16

Vote
- Voting system: 50/50 combination of jury and public vote
- Winning song: "Ramonda" by Teya Dora

Pesma za Evroviziju '24 (Serbian Cyrillic: Песма за Евровизију '24; PzE '24) was the third edition of Pesma za Evroviziju, the national final organised by Radio Television of Serbia (RTS) to select the Serbian entry for the Eurovision Song Contest 2024. The selection consisted of two semi-finals held on 27 and 29 February 2024, respectively, and a final on 2 March 2024, all presented by Dragana Kosjerina and Slaven Došlo.

== Format and production ==
In 2023, RTS confirmed that the national final format Pesma za Evroviziju would once again be organised to determine its representative at the Eurovision Song Contest 2024. The selection consisted of two semi-finals on 27 and 29 February 2024, and a final on 2 March 2024, all held at the RTS Studio 8 in Košutnjak. Fourteen contestants competed in each semi-final, eight of them qualifying for the final. The semi-final each artist would take part in and their running order were revealed on 24 January 2024.

=== Production ===
Pesma za Evroviziju '24 was produced by RTS and SkyMusic. PzE '24 had a budget of around €250,000, whilst around €300,000 were spent, with an additional €173,000 spent in non-monetary contributions by RTS.

=== Voting ===
The eight qualifiers from each semi-final and the winner of the final were selected through a 50/50 combination of votes from a jury and from a public televote, with the same system used to award points in the Eurovision Song Contest final: the jury and the public each awarded one set of 12, 10 and 8–1 points to their 10 favourite entries.

=== Presenters ===
Dragana Kosjerina and Slaven Došlo were the main stage presenters of the shows. Kristina Radenković and Stefan Popović hosted the green room segments.

== Competing entries ==
On 26 July 2023, RTS opened an online form for interested artists to submit their entries. The submission period was supposed to last until 1 November 2023, but the window was extended until 10 November a week before the intended closing. Performers were required to hold Serbian citizenship, whilst there were no limitations as to whom could be a songwriter. At least 51% of lyrics of the submitted entries had to be in one of the official languages of Serbia. At the closing of the deadline, a record 235 entries had been submitted. These were assessed by a dedicated committee at a listening round on 11 December 2023. 28 entries were then selected, and were announced on 21 December. They were released on 25 January 2024.

Selected entrants included Konstrakta, winner of Pesma za Evroviziju '22, who represented Serbia in the Eurovision Song Contest 2022 and previously competed in Beovizija 2008 and 2009 as a part of the group Zemlja gruva!, and Bojana Radovanović, who represented Serbia in the Junior Eurovision Song Contest 2018. Besides Konstrakta, returnees to the Serbian national final include Filarri, Filip Baloš and Nadia, who competed the previous year; Zorja, who competed in 2022; Zejna, who competed in both editions; Milan Bujaković, who competed the previous year and in Beovizija 2020; Ivana Vladović, who competed in the 2022 edition and Beovizija 2019; and Yanx, who competed at Beovizija 2009, Beosong 2013, Beovizija 2018 and 2019.

Pesma za Evroviziju '24 contestants
Artist	Song	Songwriter(s)
Bojana x David	"No No No"	Boris Subotić; Violeta Mihajlovska
Breskvica	"Gnezdo orlovo" (Гнездо орлово)	Ivan Đurđević; Miloš Stojković; Relja Putniković
Chai	"Sama" (Сама)	Aleksandar Ilić; Ahmed Hajdarović; Teodora Vlahović
Durlanski	"Muzika" (Музика)	Aleksandar Ilić; Dušan Anisimov; Ahmed Hajdarović
Dušan Kurtić	"Zbog tebe živim" (Због тебе живим)	Dušan Kurtić; Ivan Kurtić
Džordži	"Luna park" (Луна парк)	Pavle Subotić; Slavko Milovanović
Filarri	"Ko je ta žena?" (Ко је та жена?)	Andrijano Kadović; Nikola Kirćanski
Filip Baloš	"Duga je noć" (Дуга је ноћ)	Filip Baloš; Ivana Lukić
Hristina	"Bedem" (Бедем)	Hristina Vuković
Hydrogen	"Nemoguća misija" (Немогућа мисија)	Mario Kujundžić; Nikola Mitrović; Nikola Vujadinović; Pavle Kuntić
Iva Lorens	"Dom" (Дом)	Andrija Gavrilović; Iva Mišović
Ivana Vladović	"Jaka" (Јака)	Milan Stanković
Kat Dosa	"Tajni začin" (Тајни зачин)	Bojana Vunturišević; Slobodan Veljković
Kavala	"Vavilon" (Вавилон)	Boris Krstajić; Jana Rančić
Keni nije mrtav	"Dijamanti" (Дијаманти)	Mateja Đokić; Matija Pešić; Sava Tomić
Konstrakta	"Novo, bolje" (Ново, боље)	Ana Đurić; Jovan Antić; Milovan Bošković
Lena Kovačević	"Zovi me Lena" (Зови ме Лена)	Darko Dimitrov; Robert Bilbilov; Vladimir Danilović
Marko Mandić	"Dno" (Дно)	Marko Mandić; Nemanja Filipović
Martina Vrbos	"Da me voliš"	Martina Vrbos
Milan Bujaković	"Moje tvoje" (Моје твоје)	Lionel Lombard; Maja Sarihodžić; Petar Pupić
M.IRA	"Percepcija" (Перцепција)	Lazar Belić; Mira Maletković
Nadia	"Sudari" (Судари)	Kosta Pantelić; Nađa Terzić; Nikola Denčić
Nemanja Radošević	"Jutra bez tebe" (Јутра без тебе)	Saša Milošević Mare
Saša Báša & Virtual Ritual	"Elektroljubav" (Електрољубав)	Aleksa Stanković; Petar Milošević; Saša Baša
Teya Dora	"Ramonda" (Рамонда)	Andrijano Kadović; Luka Jovanović; Teodora Pavlovska
Yanx	"Kolo" (Коло)	Mikos Mikeli; Saška Janković
Zejna	"Najbolja" (Најбоља)	Marko Drežnjak; Zvonimir Đukić
Zorja	"Lik u ogledalu" (Лик у огледалу)	Lazar Pajić; Vladan Maksimović; Zorica Pajić

== Contest overview ==
=== Semi-finals ===
The jury in the semi-finals consisted of: Vladimir Jovanović, Željko Vasić, Miloš Mihajlović, Miloš Roganović and the jury president Goca Tržan.

==== Semi-final 1 ====
The first semi-final was held on 27 February 2024 at 21:00 CET, with the running order revealed on 24 January 2024. "Gnezdo orlovo" performed by Breskvica won the first semi-final with 24 points, winning both the jury and the public vote; other acts that qualified were Zorja, Bojana x David, Hristina, Lena Kovačević, Keni nije mrtav, M.IRA and Marko Mandić.

In addition to the competing entries, Nevena Božović opened the show with a performance of Loreen's Eurovision 2023 winning song "Tattoo", while an ABBA medley featured as the interval act with performances by Gift, Dragana Radaković, the Orthodox Celts, Dejan Petrović with Dragačevske vezilje, Ivana Peters, Zoe Kida, Ksenija Knežević, Julijana Vincan, Igor Simić, Mladen Lukić and Miloš Marković.

Semi-final 1 – 27 February 2024
R/O	Artist	Song	Jury		Televote		Total	Place
R/O	Artist	Song	Votes	Points	Votes	Points	Total	Place
1	Marko Mandić	"Dno"	31	6	722	0	6	8
2	M.IRA	"Percepcija"	10	3	1,786	6	9	7
3	Bojana x David	"No No No"	21	4	5,492	10	14	3
4	Lena Kovačević	"Zovi me Lena"	36	7	1,427	3	10	5
5	Saša Báša & Virtual Ritual	"Elektroljubav"	7	1 (Note: Songs "Elektroljubav" and "Dijamanti" had the same number of points, and they both received the same number of 12, 10 and 8—5 points (nil), however, whilst "Elektroljubav" didn't get 4 points from any jurors, "Dijamanti" got 4 points from one juror, so the latter won the tie.)	972	1	2	12
6	Martina Vrbos	"Da me voliš"	5	0	516	0	0	13
7	Filarri	"Ko je ta žena?"	4	0	1,707	5	5	9
8	Breskvica	"Gnezdo orlovo"	58	12	18,878	12	24	1
9	Hristina	"Bedem"	40	8	1,532	4	12	4
10	Ivana Vladović	"Jaka"	23	5	809	0	5	10
11	Chai	"Sama"	3	0	1,053	2	2	11
12	Zorja	"Lik u ogledalu"	45	10	3,360	8	18	2
13	Kavala	"Vavilon"	0	0	753	0	0	13
14	Keni nije mrtav	"Dijamanti"	7	2	2,573	7	9	6

Detailed jury results in the first semi-final of Pesma za Evroviziju ′24
R/O	Song	V. Jovanović	Ž. Vasić	M. Mihajlović	M. Roganović	G. Tržan	Total
1	"Dno"	6	7	7	6	5	31
2	"Percepcija"		3	3	2	2	10
3	"No No No"	5	4	4	1	7	21
4	"Zovi me Lena"	7	8	6	7	8	36
5	"Elektroljubav"		2	2	3		7
6	"Da me voliš"	2	1	1		1	5
7	"Ko je ta žena"	4					4
8	"Gnezdo orlovo"	12	12	12	10	12	58
9	"Bedem"	10	6	10	8	6	40
10	"Jaka"	1	5	8	5	4	23
11	"Sama"	3					3
12	"Lik u ogledalu"	8	10	5	12	10	45
13	"Vavilon"						
14	"Dijamanti"				4	3	7

==== Semi-final 2 ====
The second semi-final was held on 29 February 2024 at 21:00 CET, with the running order revealed on 24 January 2024. "Ramonda" performed by Teya Dora won the second semi-final with 24 points, winning both the jury and the public vote; other acts that qualified were Konstrakta, Zejna, Džordži, Iva Lorens, Nemanja Radošević, Dušan Kurtić and Milan Bujaković.

In addition to the competing entries, Luke Black opened the show with a performance of his winning song from Pesma za Evroviziju '23 "Samo mi se spava". The interval section featured Black performing his songs "God's Too Cool" and "Chainsaws in Paradise", Sanja Vučić performing "Cha Cha Cha", Hurricane performing "Fuego" and Princ performing "Soldi".

Semi-final 2 – 29 February 2024
R/O	Artist	Song	Jury		Televote		Total	Place
R/O	Artist	Song	Votes	Points	Votes	Points	Total	Place
1	Nadia	"Sudari"	13	3	815	0	3	12
2	Hydrogen	"Nemoguća misija"	7	0	1,511	4	4	9
3	Iva Lorens	"Dom"	0	0	2,122	7	7	5
4	Zejna	"Najbolja"	36	8 (Note: Songs "Najbolja" and "Zbog tebe živim" had the same number of points, and they both received the same number of 12 (once) and 10 points (once), however, "Najbolja" got 8 points twice, whilst "Zbog tebe živim" got 8 points one time, so the former won the tie.)	1,632	6	14	3
5	Filip Baloš	"Duga je noć"	10	1	1,482	3	4	10
6	Nemanja Radošević	"Jutra bez tebe"	11	2	1,602	5	7	6
7	Yanx	"Kolo"	19	4	798	0	4	11
8	Kat Dosa	"Tajni začin"	0	0	1,461	2	2	13
9	Džordži	"Luna park"	28	5	3,278	8	13	4
10	Dušan Kurtić	"Zbog tebe živim"	36	7	951	0	7	7
11	Teya Dora	"Ramonda"	60	12	6,230	12	24	1
12	Konstrakta	"Novo, bolje"	41	10	5,997	10	20	2
13	Milan Bujaković	"Moje tvoje"	29	6	570	0	6	8
14	Durlanski	"Muzika"	0	0	1,216	1	1	14

Detailed jury results in the second semi-final of Pesma za Evroviziju ′24
R/O	Song	V. Jovanović	Ž. Vasić	M. Mihajlović	M. Roganović	G. Tržan	Total
1	"Sudari"	2	3	1	5	2	13
2	"Nemoguća misija"		4		3		7
3	"Dom"						0
4	"Najbolja"	10	7	3	8	8	36
5	"Duga je noć"	6	1	2		1	10
6	"Jutra bez tebe"	1		6	1	3	11
7	"Kolo"	7	2	4	2	4	19
8	"Tajni začin"						0
9	"Luna park"	4	5	5	4	10	28
10	"Zbog tebe živim"	5	8	7	10	6	36
11	"Ramonda"	12	12	12	12	12	60
12	"Novo, bolje"	8	10	10	6	7	41
13	"Moje tvoje"	3	6	8	7	5	29
14	"Muzika"						0

=== Final ===
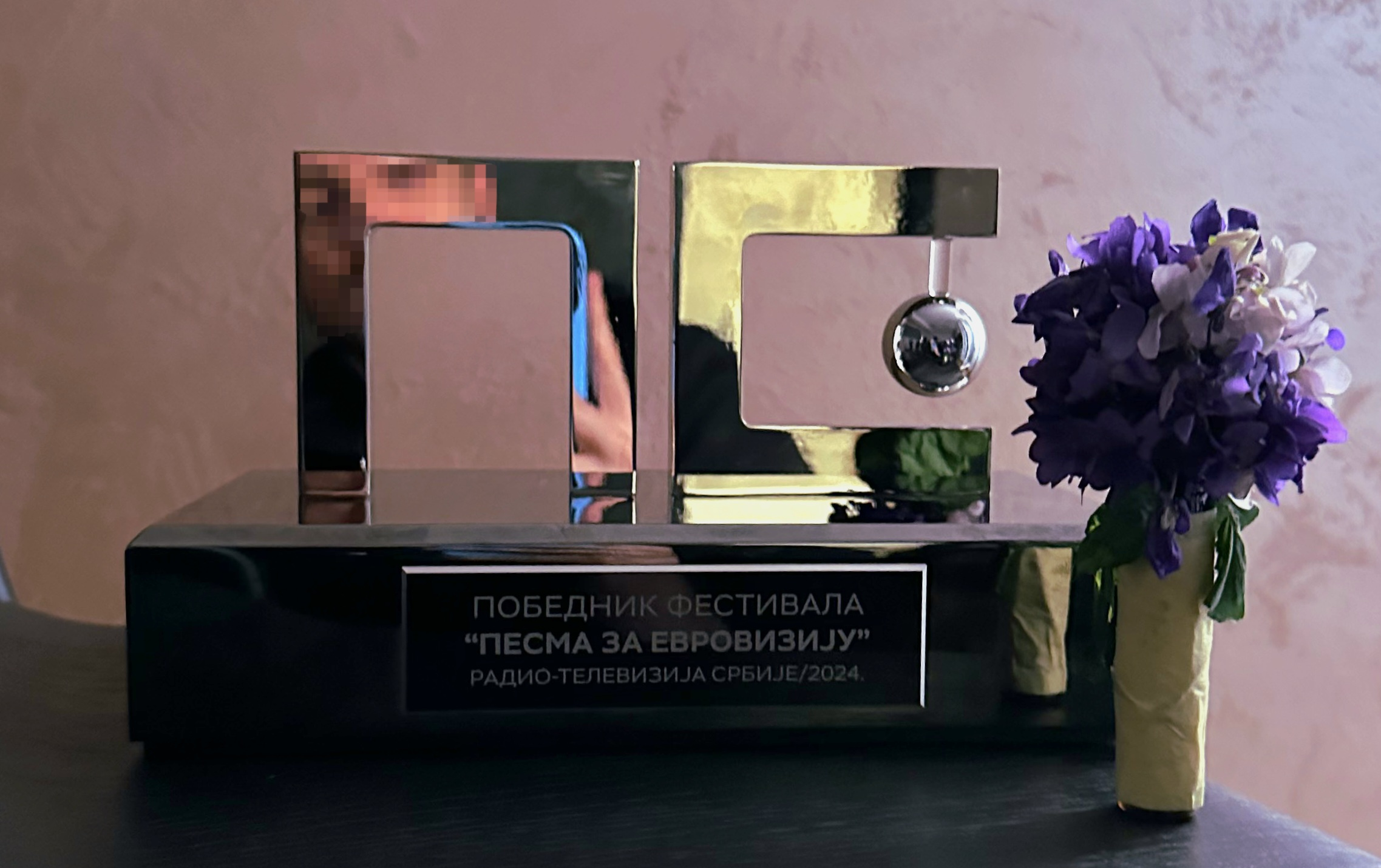
Pesma za Evroviziju '24 trophy

The final was held on 2 March 2024 at 21:00 CET.

The winner, "Ramonda" performed by Teya Dora, was decided by a combination of votes from a jury panel consisting of Zoran Živanović Žika, Ivana Rašić (Sajsi MC), Dejan Petrović, Aleksandar Sedlar and the jury president Marija Šerifović, the last of whom won the Eurovision Song Contest 2007 for Serbia, and the Serbian public via televoting. All funds collected from the viewer votes were donated to the Zvončica foundation to help children with malignant and rare diseases. In addition to the competing entries, Željko Joksimović opened the show with a performance of "Lane moje" and additionally performed some of the songs he wrote; "Lejla" by Hari Mata Hari, "Adio" by Knez, and his song "Nije ljubav stvar", as an interval act.

Final – 2 March 2024
R/O	Artist	Song	Jury		Televote		Total	Place
R/O	Artist	Song	Votes	Points	Votes	Points	Total	Place
1	Iva Lorens	"Dom"	10	2	1,554	0	2	12
2	Džordži	"Luna park"	8	1	5,085	5	6	8
3	Breskvica	"Gnezdo orlovo"	28	5 (Note: The songs "Gnezdo orlovo" and "Zbog tebe živim" had the same number of points, and they both received the same number of 12 (once), 10 (nil) and 8 (nil) points; however, "Gnezdo orlovo" got 7 points once, whilst "Zbog tebe živim" did not get 7 points from any juror, so the former won the tie.)	45,160	12	17	2
4	Teya Dora	"Ramonda"	44	12	28,114	10	22	1
5	Hristina	"Bedem"	12	3	1,092	0	3	10
6	Marko Mandić	"Dno"	7	0	1,030	0	0	15
7	M.IRA	"Percepcija"	3	0	1,678	1	1	13
8	Nemanja Radošević	"Jutra bez tebe"	4	0	1,630	0	0	14
9	Milan Bujaković	"Moje tvoje"	0	0	414	0	0	16
10	Keni nije mrtav	"Dijamanti"	7	0	2,518	2	2	11
11	Zorja	"Lik u ogledalu"	42	10	10,532	7	17	3
12	Zejna	"Najbolja"	31	7	3,627	4	11	5
13	Konstrakta	"Novo, bolje"	34	8	19,537	8	16	4
14	Bojana x David	"No No No"	3	0	8,773	6	6	7
15	Lena Kovačević	"Zovi me Lena"	29	6	1,676	0	6	9
16	Dušan Kurtić	"Zbog tebe živim"	28	4	2,834	3	7	6

Detailed jury results in the final of Pesma za Evroviziju ′24
R/O	Song	Z. Živanović	D. Petrović	Sajsi MC	A. Sedlar	M. Šerifović	Total
1	"Dom"			5	5		10
2	"Luna park"	2				6	8
3	"Gnezdo orlovo"	5	12		7	4	28
4	"Ramonda"	6	10	12	4	12	44
5	"Bedem"				12		12
6	"Dno"	1	3		3		7
7	"Percepcija"		1		2		3
8	"Jutra bez tebe"		2	2			4
9	"Moje tvoje"						0
10	"Dijamanti"	3		3		1	7
11	"Lik u ogledalu"	4	8	10	10	10	42
12	"Najbolja"	8	7	8		8	31
13	"Novo, bolje"	7	5	7	8	7	34
14	"No No No"			1		2	3
15	"Zovi me Lena"	10	4	4	6	5	29
16	"Zbog tebe živim"	12	6	6	1	3	28

== Other awards ==
=== OGAE Serbia Award ===
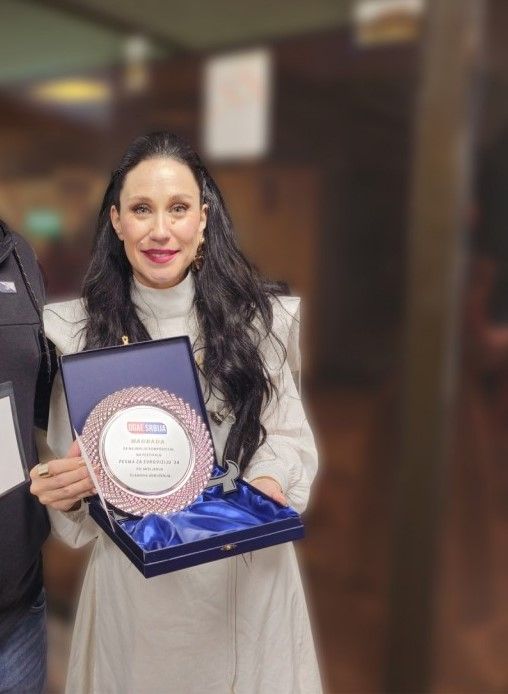
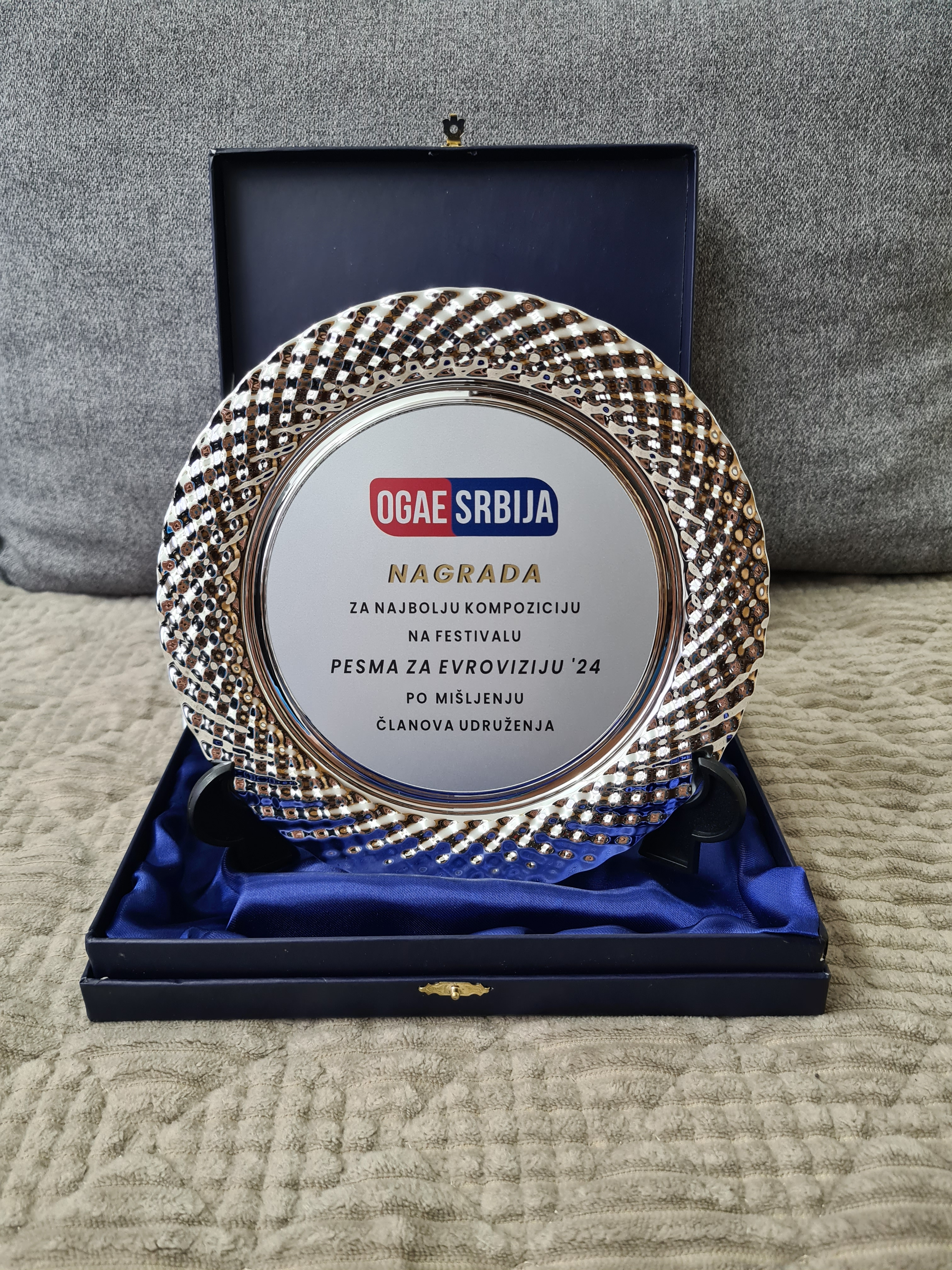
Konstrakta (left) with the OGAE Serbia award (right)

The OGAE Serbia Award for the Best Song in Pesma za Evroviziju ′24 was voted on by the association members. The award was won by the song "Novo, bolje" by Konstrakta, which was thus designated as the Serbian entry to the OGAE Second Chance Contest 2024.

Artist	Song	Points	Place
Konstrakta	"Novo, bolje"	254	1
Teya Dora	"Ramonda"	214	2
Zorja	"Lik u ogledalu"	183	3
Džordži	"Luna park"	136	4
Hristina	"Bedem"	97	5

== Broadcasts and ratings ==
The three shows were aired on RTS1, RTS Svet and RTS Planeta, as well as being streamed online via the broadcaster's website rts.rs and its official YouTube channel. The final was also aired on Radio Beograd 1. Plans to broadcast the final of the contest on the official Eurovision Song Contest YouTube channel were dropped, presumably following technical difficulties related to the broadcaster's YouTube streams of the semi-final shows; the first semi-final stream started with a delay of a few minutes, whilst the second semi-final stream started after the first four songs.

Viewing figures by show on RTS1
Show	Air date	Average viewership	Total viewership	Share (change compared to PzE '23)	Ref.
Semi-final 1	27 February 2024	487,675	1,300,000	19.53% (▲4.74%)	
Semi-final 2	29 February 2024	419,008	1,265,000	16.16% (▲3.13%)	
Final	2 March 2024	656,413	1,645,000	26.01% (▲7.14%)	

== Controversy ==
Following the contest, some members of the public were dissatisfied with the result, namely "Gnezdo orlovo" by Breskvica not winning the contest despite finishing first in the televoting. An online petition was started to demand a re-cast of the vote, also demanding that the public vote only decide the winner.

Additionally, during the broadcast of the final of the contest, it was revealed that jury member Sajsi MC had awarded zero points to "Gnezdo orlovo", causing backlash amongst some members of the public, as well as in some media, while earning praise from others. Marija Šerifović and Zoran Živanović Žika – also members of the jury – also received threats. All three of the mentioned jurors preferred the song "Ramonda" to "Gnezdo orlovo". Some accused RTS and Sajsi MC of conspiring to put her on the jury for the purpose of giving Breskvica no points, with the juror allegedly receiving threats of violence and death threats. Dragan Brajović Braja expressed his dissatisfaction by commenting that "mediocrity, an LGBT icon, a child of Other Serbia and musical irrelevance decided the outcome". Pesma za Evroviziju supervisor Olivera Kovačević stated that the voting was regular and the results of the contest could not be changed.

A rally was scheduled for 9 March in front of the RTS headquarters in support of Breskvica, with an announcement of further protests and blockades of Belgrade's road arteries, such as Slavija Square and Gazela Bridge, if the result was not overturned and Breskvica was declared the winner. Breskvica supported people's right to protest. Few people were ultimately reported to have shown up.
