= Gnezdo orlovo =

2024 single by Breskvica

Single by Breskvica
- Language: Serbian
- English title: The Eagle's Nest
- Released: 25 January 2024
- Genre: Serbian folk
- Length: 2:37
- Label: PGP RTS
- Composers: Ivan Đurđević; Miloš Stojković
- Lyricist: Relja Putniković
- Producer: Jhinsen

Breskvica singles chronology
"Kume moj" (2023)	"Gnezdo orlovo" (2024)	"Čini" (2024)

"Gnezdo orlovo" (Serbian Cyrillic: Гнездо орлово, lit. 'The Eagle's Nest') is a song by the Serbian singer Breskvica for Pesma za Evroviziju '24, the Serbian national final for the Eurovision Song Contest 2024. A Serbian folk song, it saw a significant sonic departure from Breskvica's previous artistic output. It sparked significant controversy both before, due to its seemingly nationalist lyrics, and after PZE '24, due to its second-place finish despite it winning the televote.

== Background ==
Breskvica expressed her desire to represent Serbia in the Eurovision Song Contest with a song that should represent the country in terms of lyrics, music, stage performance and meaning. In an interview with Zed TV, she stated that Serbia's previous entries "had not represented Serbia in any way", interpreted as a shot at Konstrakta's "In corpore sano". She further added that the "Serbs are special and that has to be shown. We have a special sound, we are a special people, a heavenly one."

Breskvica's comments for Zed TV attracted criticism and accusations of hypocrisy, due to the lyric "Za tebe peta dahija / Pui curu miu, to je vlaška magija" ("The fifth dahija for you / Kiss my ass, that's Vlach magic") from her 2022 single "Loša".

== Composition ==
The lyrics of the song are penned by Relja Torinno, while the music and arrangement are signed by Henny and Jhinsen, all from the Generacija Zed label. Breskvica points out that the lyrics are about the "epic battle between good and evil, about the hope that good always wins in the end, as well as that it has the power to restore everything that evil destroyed". She also stated that every listener can find a message in it for themselves, and dubbed it a "real Serbian song". Milena Zajović of Večernji list dubbed it a "nationalist budnica". The song was originally called "Gnezdo kosovo" (Serbian Cyrillic: Гнездо косово, lit. 'The Blackbird's Nest').

== Reception ==
The song attracted controversy as some listeners interpreted its lyrics as calling for the annexation of Kosovo back to Serbia, and dubbed it a "genocidal" song that "legitimizes massacres and ethnic cleansing of Kosovo Albanians". Breskvica and Radio Television of Serbia (RTS) denied the accusations that the song's lyrics were about Kosovo, with Breskvica stating that she was especially hurt by the genocidal accusations. RTS also reacted, clearly stating that the song would not be disqualified and that in case of victory it would represent Serbia at Eurovision. It also attracted further controversy due to sharing its name with Kehlsteinhaus, the summer house of Adolf Hitler. The song led Josip Bošnjak of Index.hr to compare Breskvica to Marko Perković and Baja Mali Knindža. Zoran Stajčić of Ravno Do Dna somewhat agreed with Bošnjak, comparing "Gnezdo orlovo" to Perković's "Bojna Čavoglave" (1991), as well as Bijelo Dugme's "Lipe cvatu" (1984) and "Đurđevdan" (1988).

Breskvica's colleagues Sanja Vučić, Danica Crnogorčević, Zera and Sloba Radanović supported the song. The song very quickly became the most listened to on all platforms of all the contestants of PZE '24.

== Eurovision Song Contest ==
=== Pesma za Evroviziju '24 ===
In December 2023, the list of participants of the Pesma za Evroviziju '24 was published, including Breskvica with "Gnezdo orlovo". The song was allocated to the first semi-final (held on 27 February 2024) and it qualified for the final (held on 2 March 2024), where it finished second, behind Teya Dora's "Ramonda", winning 17 points (five from the jury and 12 from the televote).

Breskvica performed the song dressed in a white dress, evoking Serbian national costume, with a halo on her head and wings on her back. The wings were compared by Jutarnji list's Klara Rožman to those worn by Croatia's Roko Blažević, Azerbaijan's Samir Javadzadeh and Norway's Tix at previous Eurovision Song Contests. Ilko Čulić of Ravno Do Dna compared the stage performance to a hybrid of young Severina and the "monastery diva" Danica Crnogorčević.

=== Aftermath ===
Serbian rapper Sajsi MC enraged Breskvica's fans by being the only PZE '24 judge who hadn't given any points to Breskvica. Breskvica herself appeared to take a jab at Sajsi by stating on RTV Pink's Ami G Show that she "hopes no one gives [Sajsi] zero points ever in her life". Sajsi subsequently began receiving death threats, being insulted in the street, and accused of "promoting pedophilia" from various TV show guests. Sajsi's husband Marko "Krsma" Trmčić was also targeted by Grobari, the ultras of FK Partizan, which both Breskvica and Krsma are fans of.

Despite Breskvica having said that—alongside "Gnezdo orlovo"—only "Ramonda" deserves to represent Serbia out of all PZE '24 entries, the fans announced a protest in front of the building of RTS in Belgrade for 9 March. In an interview with Kurir, Breskvica endorsed the protest and invited people to attend. However, the protest saw a disappointing turnout as only two protestors showed up.

The only PZE '24 judge who awarded 12 points to Breskvica, Serbian trumpeter Dejan Petrović, released a collaboration with her on 10 April 2024. The single, titled "Olovo" and recorded by the two artists and Serbian singer Sloba Radanović, served as a second single off Radanović's second album, Vreme besramnih.

== Commercial performance ==
Following the conclusion of PZE '24, "Gnezdo orlovo" debuted at number 13 on Billboard's Croatia Songs chart issue dated 16 March 2024. It dropped to number 21 the following week, before completely leaving the chart.

== Track listing ==
- Digital download
1. "Gnezdo orlovo" – 2:37

== Charts ==
Chart performance for "Gnezdo orlovo"
Chart (2024)	Peak position
Croatia (Billboard)	13
