= Periscepsia stylata =

Scientific classification
- Kingdom: Animalia
- Phylum: Arthropoda
- Clade: Pancrustacea
- Class: Insecta
- Order: Diptera
- Family: Tachinidae
- Genus: Periscepsia
- Subgenus: Petinarctia
- Species: P. stylata

Binomial name
- Periscepsia stylata (Brauer & von Berganstamm, 1891)

Synonyms
- Peteina stylata Brauer & von Berganstamm, 1891

Species of fly

Periscepsia stylata is a species of fly in the family Tachinidae.

== Distribution ==
Periscepsia stylata is found in Canada, the United States, Greenland, Sweden and Russia.
