= Petinarctia =

Scientific classification
- Kingdom: Animalia
- Phylum: Arthropoda
- Clade: Pancrustacea
- Class: Insecta
- Order: Diptera
- Family: Tachinidae
- Genus: Periscepsia
- Subgenus: Petinarctia; Villeneuve, 1928

Type species
- Peteina stylata Brauer & von Berganstamm, 1891

Synonyms
- Peteinarctia Townsend, 1939; Rhynchopeteina Townsend, 1931; Pseudopetina Ringdahl, 1933

Subgenus of flies

Petinarctia is a subgenus of flies in the family Tachinidae.

== Species ==
- Periscepsia stylata (Brauer & von Berganstamm, 1891)
