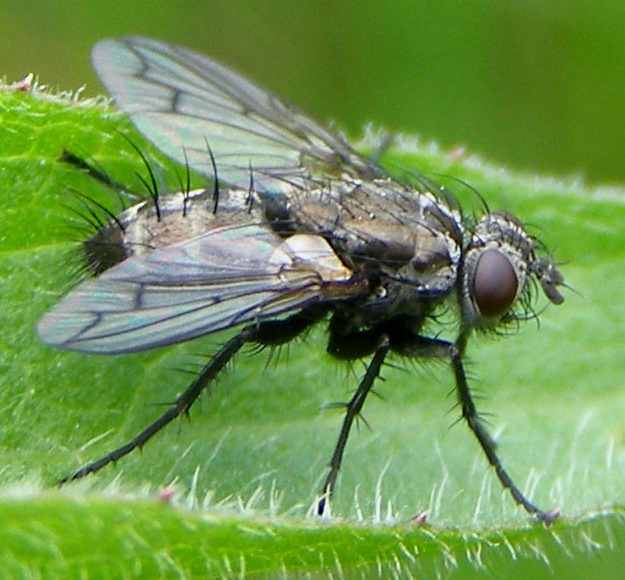
- Female Periscepsia spathulata

Scientific classification
- Kingdom: Animalia
- Phylum: Arthropoda
- Clade: Pancrustacea
- Class: Insecta
- Order: Diptera
- Family: Tachinidae
- Genus: Periscepsia
- Subgenus: Ramonda
- Species: P. spathulata

Binomial name
- Periscepsia spathulata (Fallén, 1820)

Synonyms
- Tachina spathulata Fallén, 1820

= Periscepsia spathulata =

Species of fly

Periscepsia spathulata is a species of fly in the family Tachinidae.

== Distribution ==
British Isles, Czech Republic, Hungary, Lithuania, Poland, Slovakia, Ukraine, Denmark, Finland, Norway, Sweden, Andorra, Bulgaria, Croatia, Greece, Italy, Portugal, Spain, Austria, Belgium, France, Germany, Netherlands, Switzerland, Japan, Iran, Mongolia, Russia, Transcaucasia, China.
