= Hristina Vuković =

Serbian singer-songwriter

Hristina Vuković Христина Вуковић
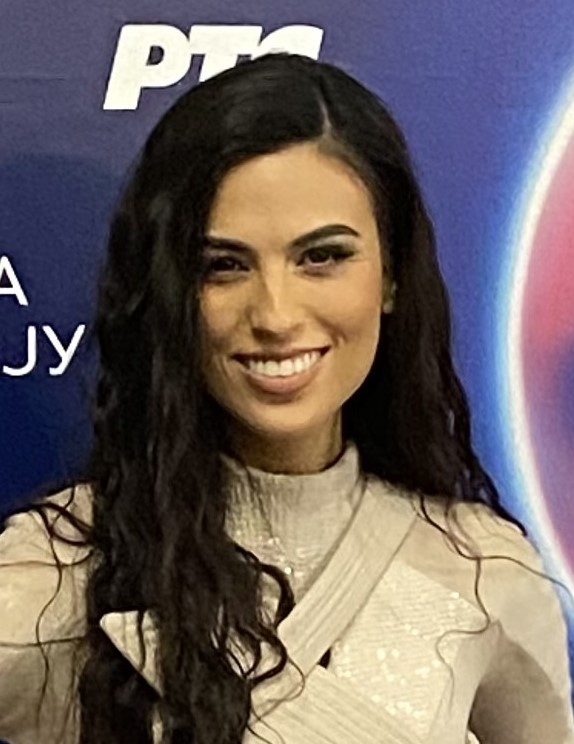

Background information
- Also known as: Hristina
- Born: Belgrade, Serbia
- Occupations: Singer; songwriter; psychologist

Hristina Vuković (Serbian Cyrillic: Христина Вуковић), known mononymously as Hristina, is a Serbian singer, songwriter and psychologist.

Hristina was born in Belgrade where she lives and works. Her parents are originally from Montenegro. She graduated with a degree in psychology. She participated in the music competition X Factor Adria, and released her first single "Deep Waters" in 2014 shortly after. She is a backing vocalist in Željko Joksimović's band. According to the assessment of the Milan Mladenović Foundation in 2019, Vuković's song "Kazaljka" was among the 12 best original compositions in the territory of the former Yugoslavia.

In 2023, she released her debut album Bedem, published by PGP-RTS and promoted at the Studio 6 of Radio Belgrade. With the song of the same name, she was announced among the participants of Pesma za Evroviziju '24, the Serbian national final for the Eurovision Song Contest 2024. The song qualified for the final.

== Discography ==
=== Albums ===
- Bedem (2023)

=== Singles ===
- Deep Waters (2014)
- Usamljeni ljudi (2023)
- Sami zajedno (2023)
- Kasnim (2023)
- Decembar (2023)
- Bedem (2023)
