= Periscepsia handlirschi =

Scientific classification
- Kingdom: Animalia
- Phylum: Arthropoda
- Clade: Pancrustacea
- Class: Insecta
- Order: Diptera
- Family: Tachinidae
- Genus: Periscepsia
- Subgenus: Periscepsia
- Species: P. handlirschi

Binomial name
- Periscepsia handlirschi (Brauer & von Berganstamm, 1891)

Synonyms
- Phorichaeta handlirschi Brauer & von Berganstamm, 1891

Species of fly

Periscepsia handlirschi is a species of fly in the family Tachinidae.

== Distribution ==
Italy, Spain, France, Switzerland, Israel, Palestine, Egypt, China.
