= Periscepsia jugorum =

Scientific classification
- Kingdom: Animalia
- Phylum: Arthropoda
- Clade: Pancrustacea
- Class: Insecta
- Order: Diptera
- Family: Tachinidae
- Genus: Periscepsia
- Subgenus: Ramonda
- Species: P. jugorum

Binomial name
- Periscepsia jugorum (Villeneuve, 1928)

Synonyms
- Wagneria jugorum Villeneuve, 1928

Species of fly

Periscepsia jugorum is a species of fly in the family Tachinidae.

== Distribution ==
Austria, France, Switzerland.
