= Periscepsia delphinensis =

Scientific classification
- Kingdom: Animalia
- Phylum: Arthropoda
- Clade: Pancrustacea
- Class: Insecta
- Order: Diptera
- Family: Tachinidae
- Genus: Periscepsia
- Subgenus: Ramonda
- Species: P. delphinensis

Binomial name
- Periscepsia delphinensis (Villeneuve, 1922)

Synonyms
- Wagneria delphinensis Villeneuve, 1922

Species of fly

Periscepsia delphinensis is a species of fly in the family Tachinidae.

== Distribution ==
Poland, Slovakia, Italy, Spain, Austria, France, Switzerland, Mongolia, Russia, China.
