= Periscepsia (subgenus) =

Scientific classification
- Kingdom: Animalia
- Phylum: Arthropoda
- Clade: Pancrustacea
- Class: Insecta
- Order: Diptera
- Family: Tachinidae
- Genus: Periscepsia
- Subgenus: Periscepsia; Gistel, 1848

Synonyms
- Scopolia Robineau-Desvoidy, 1830; Prophorichaeta Townsend, 1928

Genus of flies

Periscepsia is a subgenus of flies in the family Tachinidae.

== Species ==
- Periscepsia abbreviata (Mesnil, 1950)
- Periscepsia amicula (Mesnil, 1950)
- Periscepsia carbonaria (Panzer, 1797)
- Periscepsia handlirschi (Brauer & von Berganstamm, 1891)
- Periscepsia lindneri (Mesnil, 1959)
- Periscepsia meyeri (Villeneuve, 1930)
- Periscepsia misella (Villeneuve, 1937)
- Periscepsia nudinerva (Mesnil, 1950)
- Periscepsia umbrinervis (Villeneuve, 1937)
