= Iva Lorens =

Serbian singer-songwriter (born 1996)

Iva Lorens Ива Лоренс
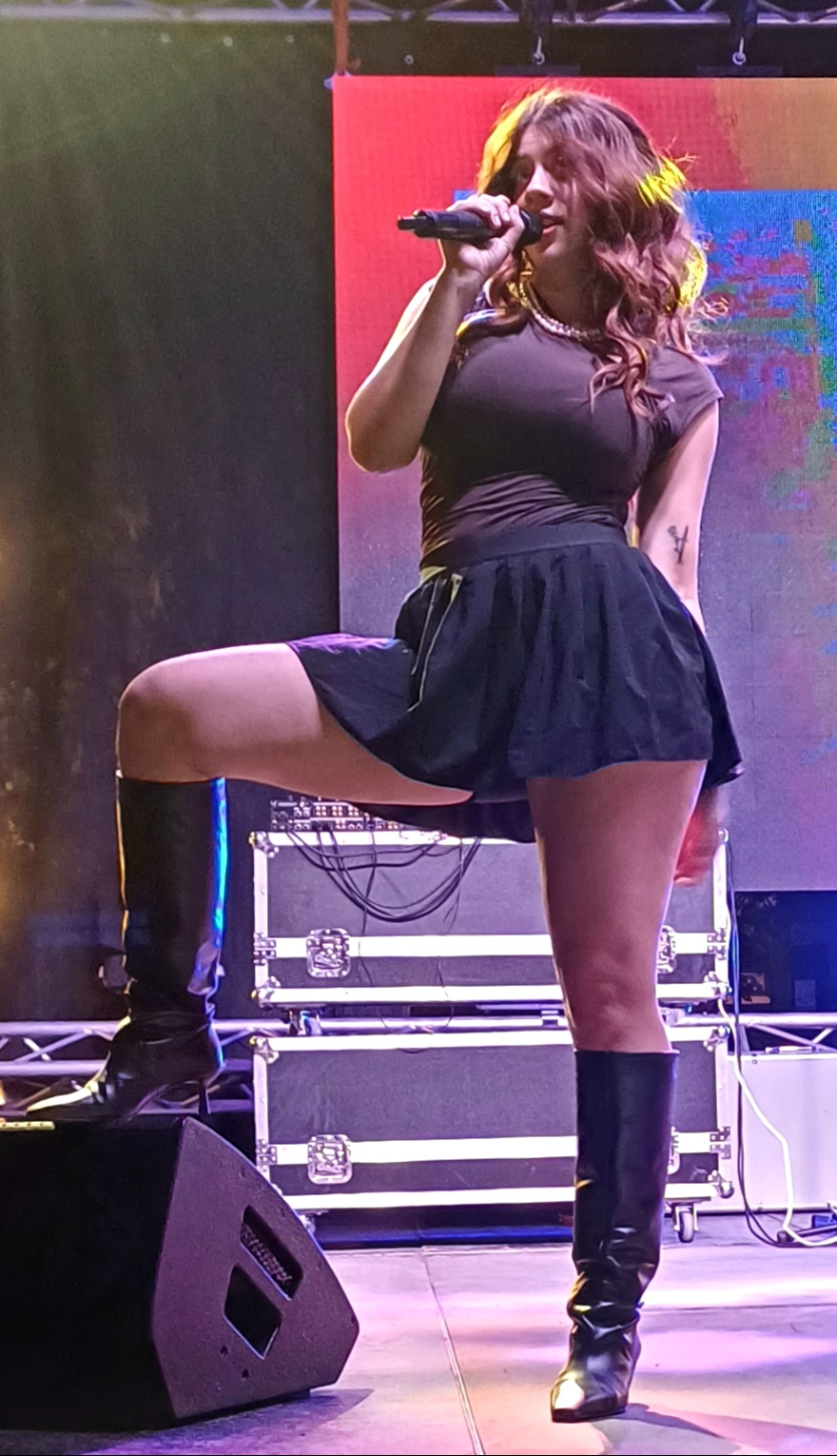
- Iva Lorens at Belgrade Pride, 2024

Background information
- Born: Iva Mišović; 1 July 1996 (age 30); Belgrade, Serbia, FR Yugoslavia
- Occupations: Singer; songwriter; record producer

Iva Mišović (Serbian Cyrillic: Ива Мишовић, born on 1 July 1996), better known under the stage name Iva Lorens (Serbian Cyrillic: Ива Лоренс, lit. 'Eva Lawrence'), is a Serbian record producer and singer-songwriter.

== Biography ==
Lorens started writing songs at the age of 9. Her mother is a model, host and journalist Irena Mišović.

Lorens completed music management studies in Berlin at the British Institute of Modern Music and lives between Berlin and Belgrade. She was a presenter on MTV. The song Just Because was a hit in Germany. She first published songs in English, and from 2021 in Serbian, when she released the song Svitanje, which she wrote with the Pančevo-based band Buč Kesidi. As part of the music project Tuborg Open in Los Angeles, Lorens gets the opportunity to collaborate with Jason Derulo.

On 21 December 2023, Lorens was announced among the participants of Pesma za Evroviziju '24, the Serbian national final for the Eurovision Song Contest 2024, with the song "Dom". The song qualified for the final.

== Discography ==
=== Albums ===
- I Guess it's About You (2020)
- Svitanje (2023)
- Svitanje (Deluxe edition) (2023)

=== Singles ===
Title	Year	Album
"Close"	2019	I Guess it's About You
"No Good For Him"	2019	I Guess it's About You
"Never Get Better"	2020	I Guess it's About You
"Just Because"	2020	I Guess it's About You
"Svitanje"	2021	Svitanje
"Zima"	2021	Svitanje
"Tenzija"	2022	Svitanje
"2 do 4"	2022	Svitanje
"Flirt"	2022	Svitanje
"Hej (nisi više isti)"	2022	Svitanje
"Udarci"	2023	Svitanje
"Dom"	2024	Non-album singles

=== Guest appearances ===
Title	Year	Other artist(s)	Album
"gubim se."	2023	A.N.D.R.	pratim se.
"Asfalt"	2024	Marko Bošnjak	Non-album singles
