= Breskvica =

Serbian singer (born 2001)

Breskvica Бресквица
- Born: Anđela Ignjatović; 18 May 2001 (age 25); Belgrade, Serbia, FR Yugoslavia
- Genre: Folk-pop
- Occupation: Singer
- Years active: 2019–present
- Labels: Generacija Zed; Toxic Entertainment
- Partner: Voyage (2019–2021)

Anđela Ignjatović (Serbian: Анђела Игњатовић; born 19 May 2001), known professionally as Breskvica (Serbian Cyrillic: Бресквица, pronounced [brêskvitsa], lit. 'Little Peach'), is a Serbian singer. She debuted in 2019 with the single "Utopia" and subsequently rose her popularity by collaborating with her ex-boyfriend, Voyage. Following their breakup in 2021, Breskvica pursued a solo career with the single "Srećan put". She is known for performing both urban and folk-influenced popular music.

== Early life ==
Anđela Ignjatović was born on 19 May 2001 in Belgrade. She plays the piano and guitar.

== Career ==
On 29 August 2019, Breskvica made her recording debut with the single "Utopia" under Generacija Zed. She rose to prominence by collaborating with her ex-boyfriend, Voyage, between 2019 and 2021. The couple also won the YouTube Star Award at the 2020 Music Awards Ceremony.

Following their breakup, Breskvica released her first solo single, "Srećan put", in July 2021. She continued releasing successful commercial standalone singles in the following years, including her folk-pop collaboration song "Sava i Dunav" (2022) with Henny, which would become one of her biggest hits with over 80 million views on YouTube. Her duet with Teodora Džehverović, titled "Drift", peaked atop of the Billboard Croatia Songs chart in March 2023. In June 2023, Breskvica headlined the Belgrade Music Week Festival. For some of performances, she went away from her usual image to sing popular traditional Serbian folk songs whilst dressed up in the national costume.

Breskvica competed in Serbia's national selection festival for the Eurovision Song Contest 2024, called Pesma za Evroviziju '24, with the song "Gnezdo orlovo". She finished as the runner-up by coming first in the televote with over 45,000 votes and 7th in the jury vote. Breskvica's ethnically infused entry and performance saw overwhelming support from the nationalists and traditionalists, who also heavily disapproved the winner, Teya Dora, and her song "Ramonda", despite it also carrying patriotic motives. In May 2024, it was announced that Breskvica would perform at her first solo concert at the Tašmajdan Center in Belgrade on 6 September. However, when Breskvica was asked about it in July, she stated that the concert was a "disinformation" despite the fact that there had been promotional billboards and that the tickets had been on sale. Subsequently, it was announced by the organizers that the concert was officially cancelled and purchased tickets were refunded. On November 29, 2024, Breskvica released her debut album Turbo i folk under Generacija Zed.

== Personal life ==
Breskvica was in a relationship with fellow singer Voyage. The couple broke up in January 2021 after two years of dating. In July 2021, it was revealed that Ignjatović started dating Nemanja Stanisavljević who works as a policeman and a bodyguard.

== Discography ==
=== Albums ===
==== Studio albums ====
Title
Turbo i folk
Details
- Released: 29 November 2024
- Label: Generacija Zed
- Format: Digital download, streaming
Notes
Track listing
- | No. | Title | Length |
  |---|---|---|
  | 1. | "Nova ja" | 2:32 |
  | 2. | "Turbo i folk" | 3:40 |
  | 3. | "Natalna" | 3:00 |
  | 4. | "Kerber" | 3:06 |
  | 5. | "Štene" | 3:10 |
  | 6. | "Australija" | 2:28 |
  | 7. | "Desi se" | 2:40 |
  | 8. | "Prodani" | 2:56 |
  | 9. | "Nisam ti ja mama" | 3:04 |
  | 10. | "Znak" | 2:49 |
  | 11. | "Loša zamena" | 3:06 |
  | 12. | "Slavija" | 3:51 |
  | 13. | "Žetva" | 3:18 |
  | Total length: | | 39:40 |

==== Live albums ====
| Title | Details |
|---|---|
| Belgrade Music Week 2023 (Live) | Released: 31 July 2023; Label: Sky Music; Format: Digital download, streaming |

=== Extended plays ===
Title
Descarada
Details
- Released: 27 April 2026
- Label: Generacija Zed
- Format: Digital download, streaming
Notes
Track listing
- | No. | Title | Length |
  |---|---|---|
  | 1. | "Descarado" | 3:23 |
  | 2. | "Dva ludaka" | 3:01 |
  | 3. | "Vampir" | 2:45 |
  | 4. | "Posle nas" | 2:36 |
  | Total length: | | 11:45 |

=== Singles ===
==== As lead artist ====
| Title | Year | Peak chart positions | | | Album |
| Title | Year | AUT | AUT Billb. | CRO Billb. | Album |
|---|---|---|---|---|---|
| "Utopia" | 2019 | — | * | * | Non-album singles |
| "Koraci u noći" (feat. Vuk Mob and Voyage) | 2019 | — | * | * | Non-album singles |
| "C'est la vie" (feat. Voyage) | 2020 | — | * | * | Non-album singles |
| "Pancir" (feat. Voyage and Tanja Savić) | 2020 | — | * | * | Non-album singles |
| "Anđele" (feat. Voyage) | 2020 | — | * | * | Non-album singles |
| "Beli grad" (feat. Voyage) | 2021 | — | * | * | Non-album singles |
| "Srećan put" | 2021 | — | * | * | Non-album singles |
| "Maska" | 2022 | — | * | * | Non-album singles |
| "Loša" | 2022 | — | — | 11 | Non-album singles |
| "Mazohista" | 2022 | — | — | — | Non-album singles |
| "Lutka" | 2022 | — | — | 6 | Non-album singles |
| "Leptir" | 2022 | — | — | — | Non-album singles |
| "Balkanska" | 2022 | — | — | — | Non-album singles |
| "Sava i Dunav" (with Henny) | 2022 | 29 | 22 | 3 | Non-album singles |
| "Loš" | 2022 | — | — | 14 | Non-album singles |
| "Sa anđelima" | 2023 | — | — | — | Non-album singles |
| "Bad Boy" | 2023 | — | — | — | Non-album singles |
| "Drift" (feat. Teodora Džehverović) | 2023 | — | — | 1 | Non-album singles |
| "Ko to tamo" (feat. Henny) | 2023 | 33 | — | 2 | Non-album singles |
| "Do gole kože" | 2023 | — | — | 2 | Non-album singles |
| "Vidi se" | 2023 | — | — | — | Non-album singles |
| "Kume moj" | 2023 | — | — | — | Non-album singles |
| "Gnezdo orlovo" | 2024 | — | — | 13 | Non-album singles |
| "Čini" | 2024 | — | — | 6 | Non-album singles |
| "Olovo" (feat. Sloba Radanović and Dejan Petrović) | 2024 | — | — | — | Vreme besramnih |
| "Alo gde si ti" (feat. THCF) | 2024 | — | — | 12 | Non-album single |
| "Na njenim rukama" | 2024 | — | — | 15 | Generacija Zed 2024 |
| "Crni šećeru" (feat. Zorana Mićanović) | 2024 | — | — | — | Non-album singles |
| "Vatra i dim"(feat. DJ Shone) | 2024 | — | — | — | Non-album singles |
| "Sneg"(feat. Saša Matić) | 2025 | — | — | 12 | Non-album singles |
| "Nemoguća ljubav"(with Peđa Jovanović) | 2025 | — | — | – | Non-album singles |
| "Nebo i zemlja"(with Henny) | 2025 | — | — | – | Non-album singles |
"—" denotes a single that did not chart in that territory. "*" denotes a single that was released before the chart's launch.

==== As featured artist ====
| Title | Year | Peak chart positions | | | Album |
| Title | Year | AUT | AUT Billb. | CRO Billb. | Album |
|---|---|---|---|---|---|
| "Vrati me" (Voyage feat. Breskvica) | 2019 | — | * | * | Non-album singles |
| "Budi tu" (Voyage feat. Breskvica) | 2019 | — | * | * | Non-album singles |
| "Dam" (Voyage feat. Breskvica) | 2020 | — | * | * | Non-album singles |
| "Bezimena" (Voyage feat. Breskvica) | 2020 | — | * | * | Non-album singles |
| "Život si moj" (MC Stojan feat. Breskvica) | 2022 | — | * | 3 | Non-album singles |
| "Tu tu tu" (Devito feat. Breskvica) | 2023 | 21 | 16 | 1 | Plava krv |
"—" denotes a single that did not chart in that territory. "*" denotes a single that was released before the chart's launch.
