= Periscepsia helymus =

Scientific classification
- Kingdom: Animalia
- Phylum: Arthropoda
- Clade: Pancrustacea
- Class: Insecta
- Order: Diptera
- Family: Tachinidae
- Genus: Periscepsia
- Subgenus: Ramonda
- Species: P. helymus

Binomial name
- Periscepsia helymus (Walker, 1849)

Synonyms
- Tachina helymus Walker, 1849

Species of fly

Periscepsia helymus is a species of fly in the family Tachinidae.

== Distribution ==
Canada, United States.
