= Periscepsia carbonaria =

Scientific classification
- Kingdom: Animalia
- Phylum: Arthropoda
- Clade: Pancrustacea
- Class: Insecta
- Order: Diptera
- Family: Tachinidae
- Genus: Periscepsia
- Subgenus: Periscepsia
- Species: P. carbonaria

Binomial name
- Periscepsia carbonaria (Panzer, 1797)

Synonyms
- Dexia nigrans Meigen, 1826; Melanophora fulvicornis Macquart, 1835; Musca carbonaria Panzer, 1797; Phoricheta fuliginaria Rondani, 1861; Scopolia viatica Robineau-Desvoidy, 1830; Wagneria migrans Stein, 1924

Species of fly

Periscepsia carbonaria is a species of fly in the family Tachinidae. Hosts are of the moth genus Agrotis.

== Distribution ==
British Isles, Czech Republic, Hungary, Latvia, Moldova, Poland, Romania, Slovakia, Ukraine, Denmark, Finland, Norway, Sweden, Bosnia and Herzegovina, Bulgaria, Corsica, Greece, Italy, Macedonia, Portugal, Serbia, Spain, Turkey, Austria, Belgium, Channel Islands, France, Germany, Netherlands, Switzerland, Iran, Israel, Palestine, Saudi Arabia, Russia, Transcaucasia, D.R. Congo, Kenya, Malawi, South Africa, Sudan, Yemen, Zimbabwe, China, India, Pakistan.
