= Martina Vrbos =

Croatian singer-songwriter (born 1984)

- Born: 29 February 1984 (age 42); Rijeka, SR Croatia, Yugoslavia
- Genres: Pop
- Occupations: Singer; songwriter
- Years active: 1997–present
- Label: Dallas Records

Martina Vrbos (born 29 February 1984) is a Croatian singer-songwriter who lives and works in Belgrade.

== Career ==
In 1997, Vrbos began performing with the group Putokazi, and in 2004 she had joined the group Let 3 as a permanent backing vocalist. She also collaborated with Đorđe Balašević and Rade Šerbedžija. She participated in Survivor VIP: Costa Rica in 2012 and was a host on MTV Adria. She has also participated in the Croatian national selection Dora for the Eurovision Song Contest 2010. On 21 December 2023, Vrbos was announced among the participants of Pesma za Evroviziju '24, the Serbian national final for the Eurovision Song Contest 2024, with the song "Da me voliš". The song failed to qualify for the final.

== Personal life ==
Vrbos has two children with Bogoljub Vidaković, with whom she has been married since 2016.

== Discography ==
=== Albums ===
- Sve moje vode (2015)

=== Singles ===
- "Tisuću i jedini" (2012)
- "Hajde da... uzmemo neki dobar auto" (2015)
- "Na kraju grada" (2015)
- "Dilema" (2015)
- "Pusti neka pričaju" (2016)
- "S tobom je sve" (2021)
- "Nestajem" (2022)
- "Zašto mi ne daš da te volim" (2023)
- "Da me voliš" (2024)
