= Periscepsia laevigata =

Scientific classification
- Kingdom: Animalia
- Phylum: Arthropoda
- Clade: Pancrustacea
- Class: Insecta
- Order: Diptera
- Family: Tachinidae
- Genus: Periscepsia
- Subgenus: Ramonda
- Species: P. laevigata

Binomial name
- Periscepsia laevigata (Wulp, 1890)

Synonyms
- Rhinophora laevigata Wulp, 1890

Species of fly

Periscepsia laevigata is a species of fly in the family Tachinidae.

== Distribution ==
Canada, United States, Guatemala, Mexico.
