= Lena Kovačević =

Serbian musical artist (born 1982)

Lena Kovačević Лена Ковачевић
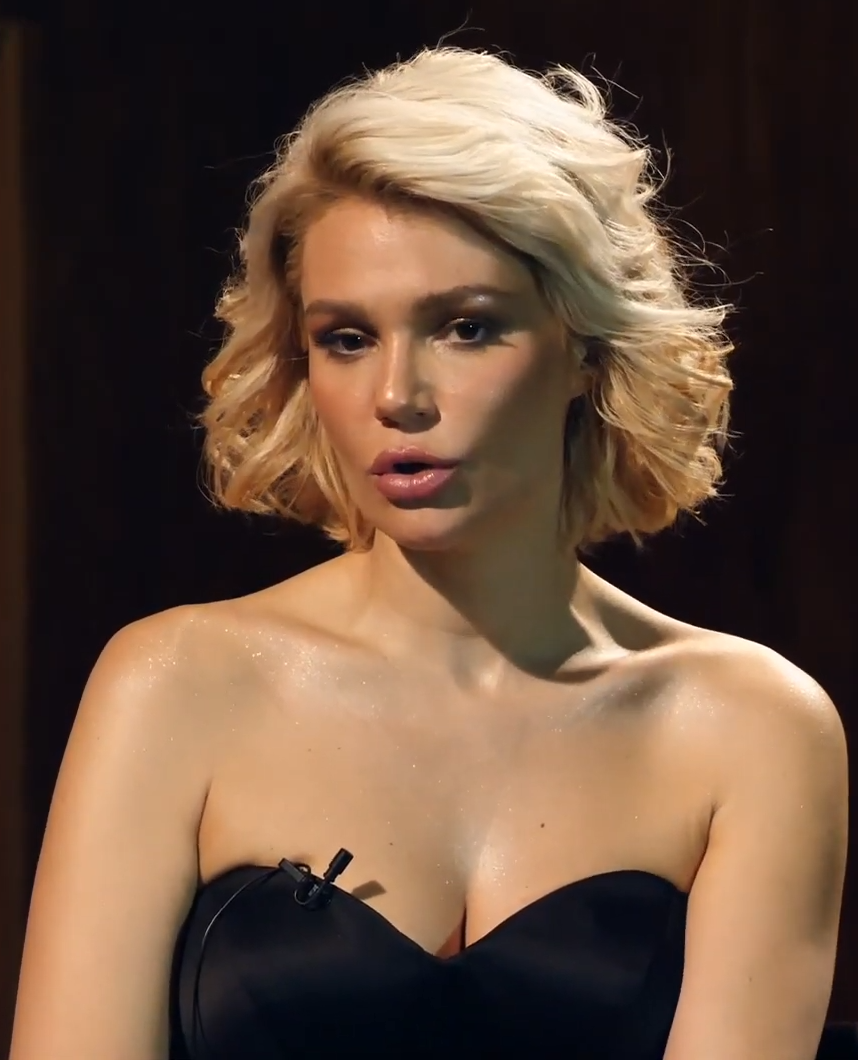
- Kovačević in 2023

Background information
- Born: Lena Kovačević; 25 February 1982 (age 44); Belgrade, SR Serbia, Yugoslavia
- Genres: Pop; easy listening; jazz; electropop; dance-pop
- Occupations: Singer
- Instruments: Vocals
- Years active: 2003–present
- Labels: PGP-RTS; Magic Records

Lena Kovačević (Serbian Cyrillic: Лена Ковачевић, born on 25 February 1982) is a Serbian singer.

== Biography ==
She graduated in jazz singing from the Conservatorium van Amsterdam.

Kovačević debuted in her father's 2003 movie The Professional, where she performed the song "Pada vlada" alongside Bajaga i Instruktori.

Since 2009, Kovačević has released four studio albums and numerous singles, including "Caffe" (2017), "Dubine" and "Samo da mi je" (2019). In October 2022, she opened for Lara Fabian in the Belgrade Arena. Kovačević has performed her music alongside a symphony orchestra across Europe.

Additionally, Kovačević served as a judge on the first season of the singing competition Prvi glas Srbije (2011) and starred in the movie Nije loše biti čovek (2021).

On 21 December 2023, she was announced among the participants of Pesma za Evroviziju '24, the Serbian national final for the Eurovision Song Contest 2024, with the song "Zovi me Lena". The song qualified for the final.

== Personal life ==
Kovačević is the daughter of Serbian playwright and director Dušan Kovačević.

In September 2011, Kovačević married Serbian entrepreneur Veljko Brčin, with whom she has two sons.

== Discography ==
Studio albums

- Dobar dan za pevanje (2009)
- San (2013)
- Džezeri (2015)
- Caffe (2023)

== Filmography ==
Filmography of Lena Kovačević
Year	Title	Genre	Role	Notes
2003	The Professional	Film	Singer	
2011	Prvi glas Srbije	Television	Herself (judge)	Season 1
2021	Nije loše biti čovek	Film	Izabela	
2022	Pesma za Evroviziju	Television	Herself	Interval act
2022	Skale 2022	Television	Herself	With the song "Ti si moj bol" (Ти си мој бол)
2023	Pesma za Evroviziju	Television	Herself (jury member)	

== Awards and nominations ==
Award	Year	Nominated work	Category	Result	Ref.
Music Awards Ceremony	2020	"Dubine"	Female Pop Song of the Year	Won	
