= Periscepsia =

Scientific classification
- Kingdom: Animalia
- Phylum: Arthropoda
- Class: Insecta
- Order: Diptera
- Family: Tachinidae
- Subfamily: Dexiinae
- Tribe: Voriini
- Genus: Periscepsia; Gistel, 1848

Type species
- Musca carbonaria Panzer, 1798

Synonyms
- Scopolia Robineau-Desvoidy, 1830; Phoricheta Rondani, 1861; Phorichaeta Brauer & von Bergenstamm, 1889; Prophorichaeta Townsend, 1928

Genus of flies

Periscepsia is a genus of bristle flies in the family Tachinidae.

== Species ==
Subgenus Periscepsia Gistel, 1848

- Periscepsia abbreviata (Mesnil, 1950)
- Periscepsia amicula (Mesnil, 1950)
- Periscepsia carbonaria (Panzer, 1798)
- Periscepsia handlirschi (Brauer & von Bergenstamm, 1891)
- Periscepsia lindneri (Mesnil, 1959)
- Periscepsia meyeri (Villeneuve, 1930)
- Periscepsia misella (Villeneuve, 1937)
- Periscepsia nudinerva (Mesnil, 1950)
- Periscepsia umbrinervis (Villeneuve, 1937)

Subgenus Petinarctia Villeneuve, 1928

- Periscepsia stylata (Brauer & von Bergenstamm, 1891)

Subgenus Ramonda Robineau-Desvoidy, 1863

- Periscepsia barbata Mesnil, 1963
- Periscepsia cinerosa (Coquillett, 1902)
- Periscepsia clesides (Walker, 1849)
- Periscepsia cleui (Herting, 1980)
- Periscepsia delphinensis (Villeneuve, 1922)
- Periscepsia helymus (Walker, 1849)
- Periscepsia jugorum (Villeneuve, 1928)
- Periscepsia labradorensis (Brooks, 1945)
- Periscepsia laevigata (Wulp, 1890)
- Periscepsia latifrons (Zetterstedt, 1844)
- Periscepsia plorans (Rondani, 1861)
- Periscepsia polita (Brooks, 1945)
- Periscepsia prunaria (Rondani, 1861)
- Periscepsia prunicia (Herting, 1969)
- Periscepsia ringdahl (Villeneuve, 1922)
- Periscepsia rohweri (Townsend, 1915)
- Periscepsia spathulata (Fallén, 1820)
- Periscepsia zarema Richter, 1976

Unplaced to subgenus

- Periscepsia canina (Mesnil, 1950)
- Periscepsia caviceps (Emden, 1960)
- Periscepsia decolor (Emden, 1960)
- Periscepsia fratella (Villeneuve, 1938)
- Periscepsia glossinicornis (Emden, 1960)
- Periscepsia gravicornis (Loew, 1847)
- Periscepsia guttipennis (Emden, 1960)
- Periscepsia kirbyiformis (Emden, 1960)
- Periscepsia natalica (Emden, 1960)
- Periscepsia nigra (Bigot, 1857)
- Periscepsia pallidipennis (Emden, 1960)
- Periscepsia philippina (Townsend, 1928)
- Periscepsia propleuralis (Emden, 1960)
- Periscepsia rufitibia (Villeneuve, 1938)
- Periscepsia salti (Emden, 1960)
- Periscepsia turkmenica Richter, 1991
- Periscepsia vidua (Mesnil, 1950)
