= Saša Báša =

Serbian singer-songwriter

- Born: Obrenovac, Serbia
- Occupations: Singer; songwriter

Aleksandar Branković (Serbian Cyrillic: Александар Бранковић), known professionally as Saša Báša, is a Serbian singer and songwriter.

From 2016 to 2020, Baša was in the band Aleja Velikana. In 2023, he released his first solo album called Trisophrenia. The album is divided into three phases, based on three different alter-egos. The bands that accompany them are: Saša Baša and Lila Idila, Saša Baša and Snene Sene and Saša Baša and Virtual Ritual. On 21 December 2023, Baša and Virtual Ritual were announced among the participants of Pesma za Evroviziju '24, the Serbian national final for the Eurovision Song Contest 2024, with the song ""Elektroljubav" (Електрољубав). The song failed to qualify for the final.

== Discography ==
=== Albums ===
- Trizofrenija (2023)

=== Singles ===
- Zadah divljeg zapada (2022)
- Nerođeni (2022)
- Plan B za plan D (2022)
- Maska (2022)
- Glineni golubovi (2022)
- Fabrika barbika (2023)
- Izgubljeni grad (2024)
- Znaj da nisi sam (2024)
- Elektroljubav (2024)
