= Marko Mandić (singer) =

Serbian singer-songwriter (born 1992)

- Born: 18 July 1992 (age 33); Belgrade, Serbia, FR Yugoslavia
- Occupations: Singer; songwriter

Marko Mandić (Serbian Cyrillic: Марко Мандић; born 18 July 1992) is a Serbian singer and songwriter.

== Biography ==
Mandić has been involved in music since childhood, singing in a choir since childhood. He studied economics. His longtime collaborator is producer and godfather Nemanja Filipović. He released the notable duet song "Ujutru" with Sara Jo. In 2014, the song Ramdagadam was one of the most played domestic songs. On 21 December 2023, Mandić was announced among the participants of Pesma za Evroviziju '24, the Serbian national final for the Eurovision Song Contest 2024, with the song "Dno". The song qualified for the final.

Mandić is married to singer Goga Stanić and they have a daughter.

== Discography ==
=== Albums ===
- Sve što nisi (2016)

=== EPs ===
- Komerz (2022)

=== Singles ===
- Mnogo dobro (2014)
- Keva (2014)
- Ramdagadam (2015)
- Ujutro (with Sara Jo) (2015)
- Dobar dan (2015)
- Pamtim (2015)
- Daj mi to (with Gazda Paja) (2015)
- Troje (with Sara Jo) (2016)
- Instagram (with Wikluh Sky) (2016)
- Na ivici (2018)
- Kolateralna šteta (2020)
- Ratovi (2020)
- Nismo uspeli (2020)
- Zamalo (2021)
- Leto stiže (2022)
- Siguran (2023)
- Dno (2024)
