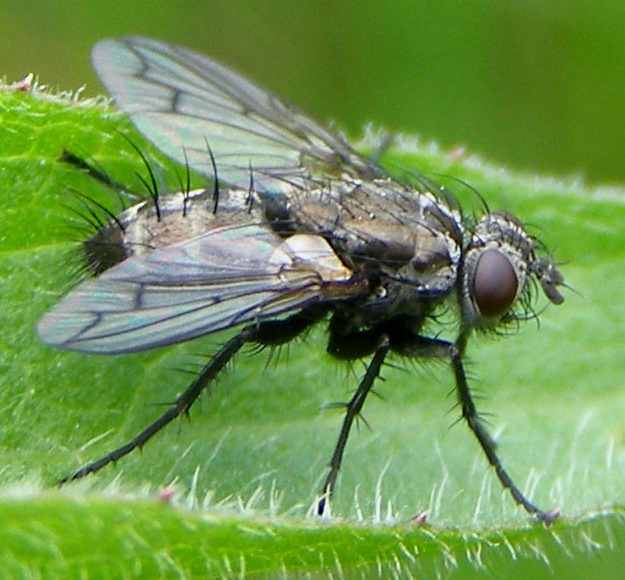
- Female Periscepsia spathulata

Scientific classification
- Kingdom: Animalia
- Phylum: Arthropoda
- Clade: Pancrustacea
- Class: Insecta
- Order: Diptera
- Family: Tachinidae
- Genus: Periscepsia
- Subgenus: Ramonda; Robineau-Desvoidy, 1863

Type species
- Ramonda fasciata Robineau-Desvoidy, 1863

Synonyms
- Andrina Robineau-Desvoidy, 1863; Ateria Robineau-Desvoidy, 1863; Petinops Brauer & von Bergenstamm, 1891; Metachaeta Coquillett, 1895; Eutricogena Townsend, 1915; Neophorichaeta Smith, 1915; Polideosoma Townsend, 1915; Peteinomima Mesnil, 1974

= Ramonda (fly) =

Subgenus of flies

Ramonda is a subgenus of flies in the family Tachinidae.

== Species ==
- Periscepsia barbata Mesnil, 1963
- Periscepsia cinerosa (Coquillett, 1902)
- Periscepsia clesides (Walker, 1849)
- Periscepsia cleui (Herting, 1980)
- Periscepsia delphinensis (Villeneuve, 1922)
- Periscepsia helymus (Walker, 1849)
- Periscepsia jugorum (Villeneuve, 1928)
- Periscepsia labradorensis (Brooks, 1945)
- Periscepsia laevigata (Wulp, 1890)
- Periscepsia latifrons (Zetterstedt, 1844)
- Periscepsia plorans (Rondani, 1861)
- Periscepsia polita (Brooks, 1945)
- Periscepsia prunaria (Rondani, 1861)
- Periscepsia prunicia (Herting, 1969)
- Periscepsia ringdahl (Villeneuve, 1922)
- Periscepsia rohweri (Townsend, 1915)
- Periscepsia spathulata (Fallén, 1820)
- Periscepsia zarema Richter, 1976
