= Belgrade Circle =

Serbian NGO

The Belgrade Circle is an NGO established in Belgrade, Serbia, in February 1992.

Initially, the organisation hosted lectures and discussions with mainly Serbian intellectuals, united by their opposition to the nationalist policies of Slobodan Milošević. The Belgrade Circle formed links with NGOs in other parts of the former Yugoslavia, and began to gain an international reputation, hosting lectures by internationally acclaimed intellectuals including Jacques Derrida, Christopher Norris and Richard Rorty. The organisation subsequently focused on strengthening civil society, and worked in co-operation with universities and academics from across the world. It also publishes the Belgrade Circle Journal, which was a member of the Eurozine network between 1995 and 2013, and has published prominent thinkers such as Rorty, Jürgen Habermas and Noam Chomsky.

In 1992 a book entitled Druga Srbja (Second Serbia or Other Serbia) came out featuring a selection of texts and speeches, made during the spring of 1992 at meetings of the Belgrade Circle, against the government, the media, the growth of nationalism and war; Other Serbia became during the 1990s, a term to designate groups and individuals who were anti-war and opposed to nationalism.
