= Zorja (singer) =

Serbian singer (born 1996)

Zorja Зорја
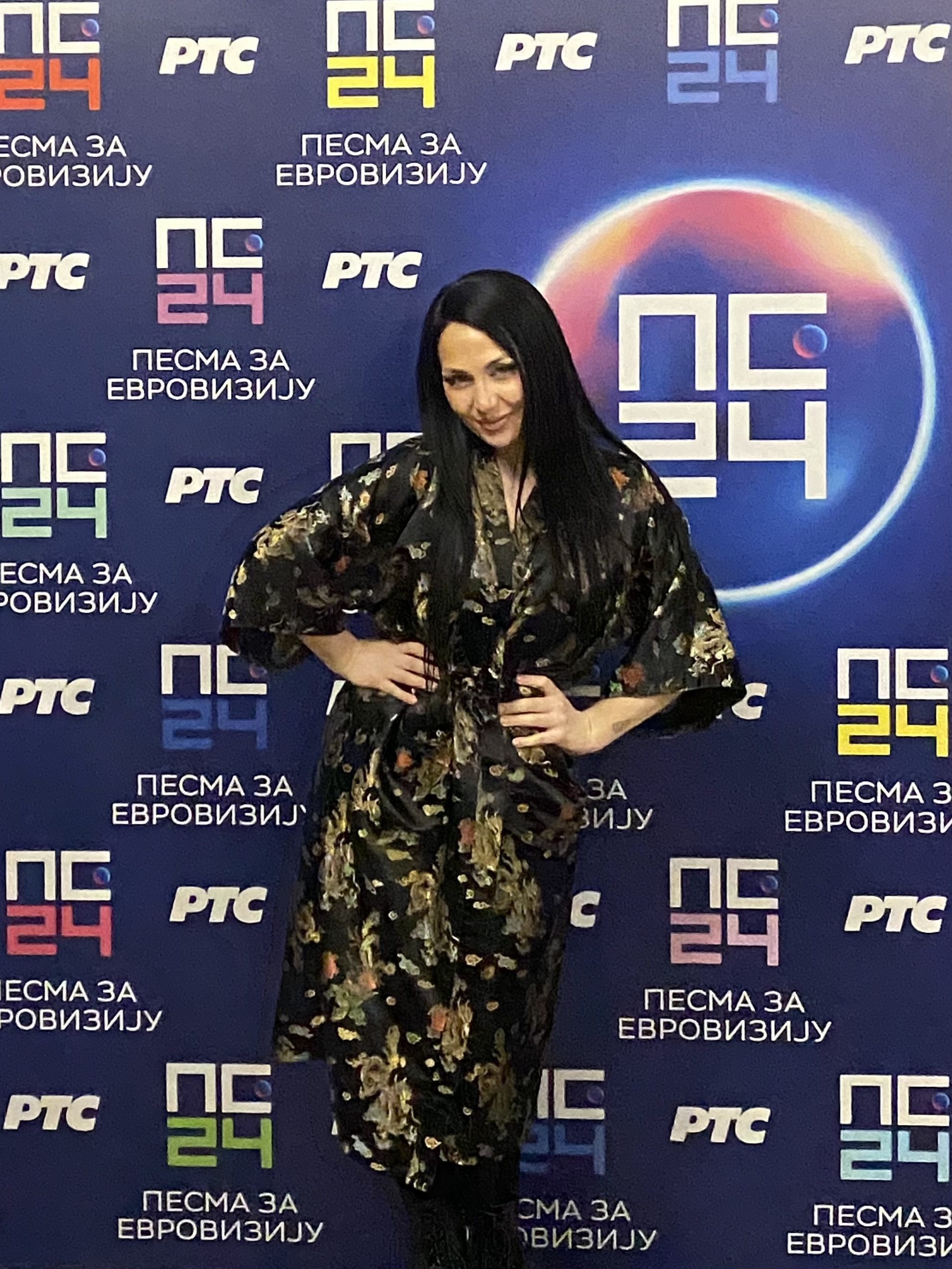

Background information
- Also known as: Zorica Pajić
- Born: Zorica Joksimović; 5 September 1996 (age 30); Belgrade, Serbia, FR Yugoslavia
- Genres: Pop; world music
- Occupations: Singer; songwriter; record producer
- Spouse: Lazar Pajić (m. 2019)

Zorica Pajić (née Joksimović; Serbian Cyrillic: Зорица Пајић, née Јоксимовић; born 5 September 1996), known mononymously as Zorja (Serbian Cyrillic: Зорја, lit. 'Zorya'), is a Serbian singer-songwriter. She gained popularity by participating in the Zvezde Granda music competition.

== Biography ==
=== Early life ===
Pajić was born on 5 September 1996 in Belgrade. As she stated, she has always loved the stage, acting, singing, playing and dancing. Since she was a child, she went to folklore and sang in an ethnic group. First, she went to the "Josif Marinković" music school, and then she graduated from the Faculty of Music in Belgrade, violin department. While she was studying, she sang and played the violin on the streets of Belgrade and Novi Sad and was already noticed on the portals, while singing ethno and playing classical music. That's how she earned money for her education. Her video clip on YouTube, when she sang the song "Oj, Kosovo, Kosovo" and the Serbian national anthem "Bože pravde" with journalist Aleksey from Siberia, was especially noticed and became viral. When she was choosing her pseudonym, she decided that it would be Zorja because in Slavic mythology she is the goddess of morning light, birth and new beginnings.

=== Zvezde Granda ===
On the first round of Zvezde Granda, Zorja received positive feedback from all the jurors, especially for the cover of "Tango" by Negative. During the competition, she opened her YouTube channel and started posting vlogs. Videos of her performances have millions of views, and she finished the competition in fifth-place by the number of audience votes.

Her first song "Lutka od porcelana" came after the competition, the song was composed by Aleksandar Milić Mili, her mentor from the competition.

=== Solo career ===
After the success in Zvezde Granda, Kurir TV hired Zorja to record the title track for the new reality program Bar. Then the song "Želim" was published. She took part in Meridian's campaign against domestic violence.

=== Pesma za Evroviziju ===
At the Pesma za Evroviziju '22, Pajić made it to the finals with the song "Zorja". In the finals, after performing with the group Luča, she finished in third place. She wrote the song with the help of her husband Lazar Pajić, who is also musician, while the backing vocals are sung by Sanja Vučić. The singer explained that the name of the song does not indicate self-love, but rather "self-explanation", describing her journey from Zorica, who went through various obstacles to Zorja, who is aware of her talent and ready to show it. The song is about finding yourself, leaving everything bad in the past and winning over yourself.

On 21 December 2023, Zorja was announced among the participants of Pesma za Evroviziju '24, the Serbian national final for the Eurovision Song Contest 2024, with the song "Lik u ogledalu". The song qualified for the final, where she again finished in third place.

=== Dora 2026 ===
In late 2025, Zorja was approached by the Croatian ethno-based group Lelek to make a collaboration. She has subsequently appeared as a backing vocal in their song "Tane". In December 2025, it has been revealed that she has been involved in the lyrics for the band's Dora 2026 bid for the song "Andromeda".

== Personal life ==
Zorja has been married to Lazar Pajić since 2019 and is the sister-in-law of the popular Serbian actor Milan Jelen Pajić.

== Discography ==
=== Albums ===
- Ja sam ona (2025)

=== Singles ===
Title	Year	Album
"Lutka od porcelana"	2021	Non-album singles
"Želim"	2021	Non-album singles
"Zorja"	2022	Non-album singles
"Lavine"	2022	Non-album singles
"Solo"	2022	Non-album singles
"Yıldızların Altında"	2022	Muzika iz filma Da li ste videli ovu ženu?
"Srce besno"	2023	Non-album singles
"Dve vatre" (ft. Igor Simić)	2023	Non-album singles
"Lik u ogledalu"	2024	Non-album singles
"Kao ti"	2024	Non-album singles
"Što te nema"	2024	Non-album singles
"Ne znam"	2024	Non-album singles
