= Other Serbia =

Serbian political term

The Other Serbia or the Second Serbia (Note: the words ’second’ and ’other’ being one and the same in Serbian) (Serbian: Друга Србија, romanized: Druga Srbija) was a term used in Serbia during the 1990s, to denote groups of intellectuals, who identified as anti-war, anti-nationalist and pro-democracy, united around their opposition to the regime of Slobodan Milošević, media consensus, war, nationalism, and the rhetoric surrounding it.

== History ==
In 1991, the Yugoslav Wars began in Slovenia and Croatia before spreading in 1992 to Bosnia and Herzegovina. In Serbia anti-war intellectuals started to unite around their opposition to the dictatorship, media consensus, the growth of nationalism and war. In 1992 the Belgrade Circle published a book edited by Ivan Čolović and Aljoša Mimica, called The Other Serbia; the book contained 80 speeches and essays, made during ten public forums that took place from April 11 to June 20, 1992 at the Student Cultural Center. The participants of those forums which raised its voice against war, hatred, extermination, and ethnic cleansing (mostly university professors, writers, artists, journalists, activists, and anti-fascists) became known as the Other Serbia. Their main activity were the anti-war protests in Belgrade in 1991-1992, which were led by Women in Black, the Centre for Anti-War Action and the Belgrade Circle. According to Filip David, the opponents of Other Serbia were "nationalist elites who declared us enemies and traitors."

The Other Serbia is the Serbia that does not put up with crime

— Radomir Konstantinović, interview on Radio Free Europe

The Other Serbia took part in all the 1991–1992 anti-war protests in Belgrade. Some of its main figure were philosopher Radomir Konstantinović, who participated in the founding of the Belgrade Circle of Independent Intellectuals and before that the Association of Independent Writers, and Serbian historian and politician Latinka Perović. According to historian Florian Bieber, Other Serbia fulfilled at the time an important symbolic function in "challenging the seeming homogeneity in intellectual and popular support for extreme nationalist policies."

In 2002 the Helsinki Committee for Human Rights in Serbia published the book The Second Serbia - ten years after (1992-2002).
