= Ramonda (song) =

2024 song by Teya Dora

Single by Teya Dora
- Language: Serbian
- English title: Ramonda
- Released: 22 January 2024
- Length: 2:54
- Label: PGP-RTS
- Composers: Teodora Pavlovska; Luka Jovanović
- Lyricists: Teodora Pavlovska; Andrijano Kadović
- Producers: Luxonee; Teya Dora

Teya Dora singles chronology
| "ATaMala" (2023) | "Ramonda" (2024) |

Music video
- "Ramonda" on YouTube

Eurovision Song Contest 2024 entry
- Country: Serbia

Finals performance
- Semi-final result: 10th
- Semi-final points: 47
- Final result: 17th
- Final points: 54

Entry chronology
- ◄ "Samo mi se spava" (2023)
- "Mila" (2025) ►

Official performance video
- "Ramonda" (First Semi-Final) on YouTube "Ramonda" (Grand Final) on YouTube

"Ramonda" (Serbian Cyrillic: Рамонда) is a song by Serbian singer-songwriter Teodora Pavlovska, known by her stage name, Teya Dora. The song was released on 22 January 2024 by PGP-RTS and was written by Pavlovska, Luka Jovanović, and Andrijano Kadović. It represented Serbia at the Eurovision Song Contest 2024, where it placed 17th with 54 points.

== Background and composition ==
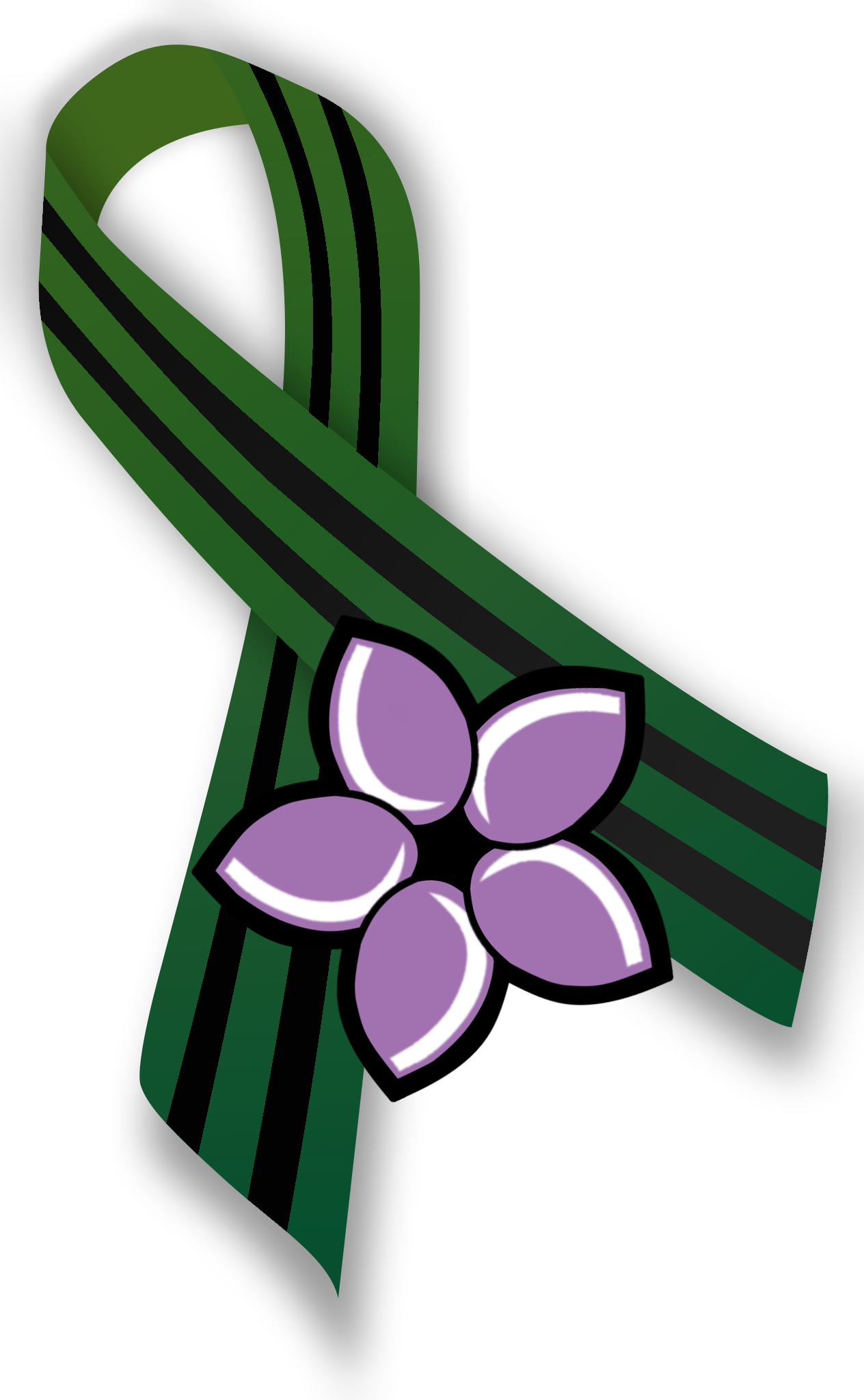
A badge containing the Natalie's ramonda on the Albanian Commemorative Medal. The badge is worn on Armistice Day within Serbia.

"Ramonda" was written by the artist, Luka "Luxonee" Jovanović, and Andrijano "Ajzi" Kadović. The song references the Natalie's ramonda flower, which is seen within Serbian society as a symbol for the Serbian people's struggle against the Central Powers in World War I during the Serbian campaign. Remarked as a symbol of hope for the flower's ability to revive itself in the case of it completely drying out, Pavlovska compared the ramonda and its symbolism for the country's rebound after the campaign. As a result, the song has been described as a "patriotic ballad". However, she has stated in interviews that the song was meant to be open for outside interpretation.

According to Pavlovska, she first got the thought to make a song for the Eurovision Song Contest after a previous song of hers, "Džanum", went viral. Pavlovska confirmed her intents to participate in Pesma za Evroviziju '24 on 16 December 2023 on the Radio Television of Serbia show Jedan dobar dan. She had previously taken part in Pesma za Evroviziju as a songwriter, having written Filarri's entry for the 2023 edition. Within the month, she was confirmed as one of the PZE '24 participants. On 25 January 2024, "Ramonda" was announced as Pavlovska's song for the competition.

== Music video and promotion ==
The music video for "Ramonda" was released on 1 March, a day before the PZE '24 final. The video opens with the quote "The light shines in the darkness, and the darkness can never extinguish it" in English, a paraphrase of John 1:5. It features Pavlovska lying on a rock, and following a light that's leading her to a mountain (possibly a symbol of Rtanj, Natalie's ramondas' habitat). It concludes with a scene of the flower resurrecting.

To further promote the song, Pavlovska announced her intents to perform it at various Eurovision pre-parties throughout the months of March and April, including Pre-Party ES 2024 on 30 March, the Barcelona Eurovision Party 2024 on 6 April, and Eurovision in Concert 2024 on 13 April.

== Critical reception ==
"Ramonda" has drawn mixed reception. In a Wiwibloggs review containing several reviews from several critics, the song was rated 6.57 out of 10 points, earning 18th on the site's annual ranking. Vulture's Jon O'Brien ranked the song 21st out of 37 songs, pointing out that Teya Dora "sings the remembrance ballad beautifully, and the crescendo's swirling strings and tribal percussion will no doubt induce some patriotic tears". However, he thought it lacked universal appeal. Another review conducted by ESC Bubble that contained reviews from a combination of readers and juries rated the song eighth out of the 15 songs "Ramonda" was competing against in its the Eurovision semi-final. The Scotsman writer Erin Adam gave the song a neutral review, rating the song six points out of 10. ESC Beat's Doron Lahav ranked the song 11th overall, stating that they thought the lyrics were "meaningful".

Amongst Balkan personalities, reception has also been mixed. Josip Bošnjak of Index.hr dubbed the song "Džanum 2". Vedrana Rudan, a Croatian novelist, reacted negatively towards the song, stating that while Pavlovska had a "phenomenal voice", she thought the performance lacked energy and was "boring".

== Eurovision Song Contest ==
=== Pesma za Evroviziju '24 ===
Serbia's broadcaster for the Eurovision Song Contest, Radio Television of Serbia (RTS), organized a 28-entry competition, Pesma za Evroviziju '24, to select its entrant for the Eurovision Song Contest 2024. The contest was split into two 14-song semi-finals, with eight songs from each semi-final qualifying into a 16-song grand final. In the final, the victor was selected via a 50/50 system of juries and televoting.

The song was officially announced as an entrant in the contest on 21 December 2023. It was drawn to compete 11th in the second semi-final on 29 February 2024, qualifying in first. The performance featured Pavlovska lying on a rock similar to the one shown in the music video. "Ramonda" was later drawn to perform fourth in the grand final. At the end of the contest, the song was announced to have won the competition, earning first with the juries and second in the televoting, gaining 12 and 10 points, respectively for a total of 22 points. As a result of winning the competition, the song won rights to represent Serbia in the Eurovision Song Contest 2024.

=== At Eurovision ===
The Eurovision Song Contest 2024 took place at the Malmö Arena in Malmö, Sweden, and consisted of two semi-finals held on the respective dates of 7 and 9 May and the final on 11 May 2024. During the allocation draw on 30 January 2024, Serbia was drawn to compete in the first semi-final, performing in the first half of the show. Pavlovska was later drawn to perform second in the semi-final, ahead of Cyprus' Silia Kapsis and behind Lithuania's Silvester Belt.

The Eurovision performance featured Pavlovska in a purple and black dress, with the performance largely similar to the one given in Pesma za Evroviziju. Some alterations were made for its Eurovision performance; according to Pavlovska, the performance "evolved" to include a "moment [so] it all ends in a more effective way". Pavlovska was primarily shown on a prop shaped like a rock, with the setting being described as "quite dark" with purple, blue, and white lighting. Nearing the end of the performance, a blooming ramonda flower is shown. "Ramonda" finished 10th in the semi-final, scoring 47 points and securing a position in the grand final.

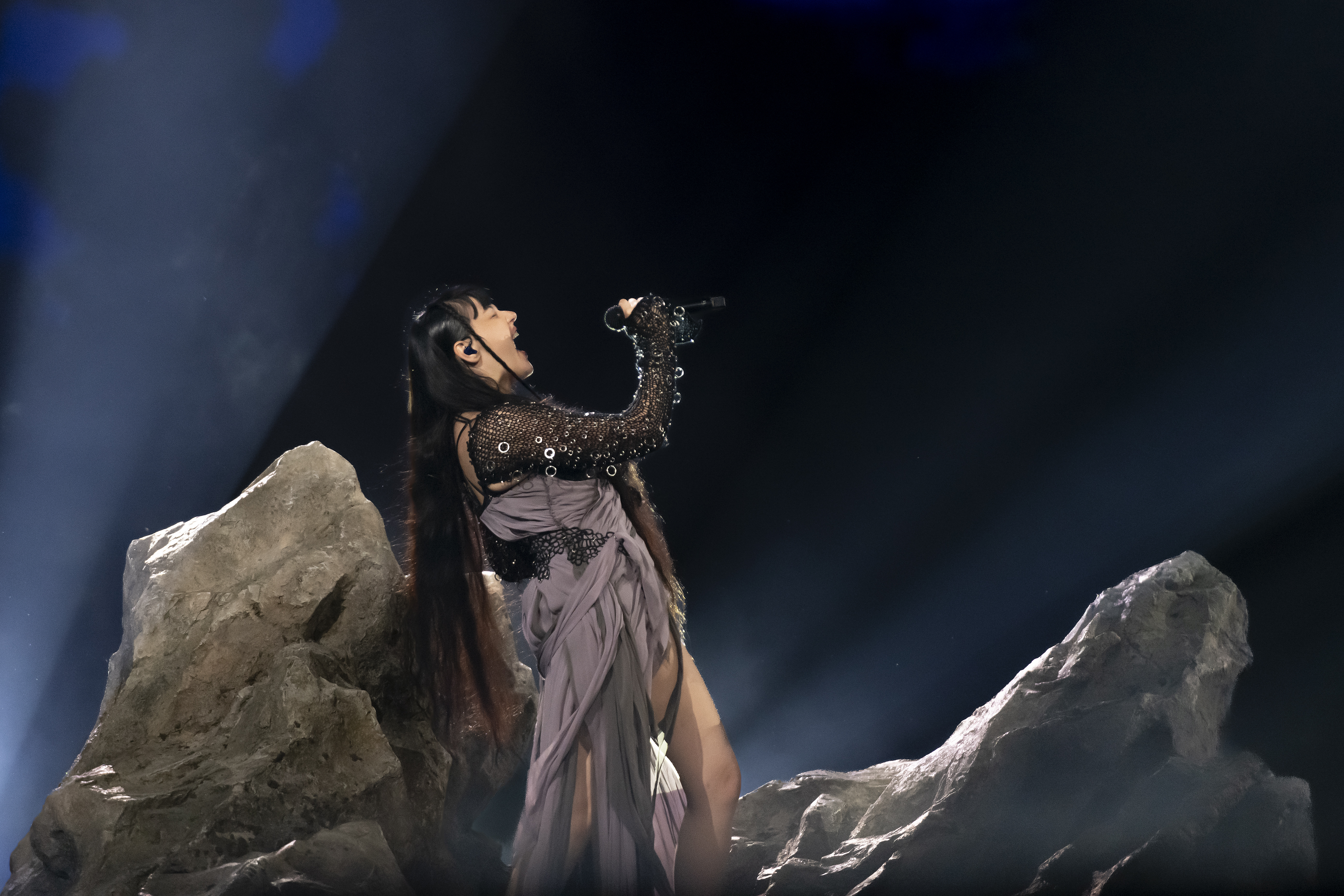
Pavlovska performing "Ramonda" at a dress rehearsal for the Eurovision 2024 grand final.

Pavlovska performed a repeat of her performance in the grand final on 11 May. The song was performed 16th in the final, ahead of Italy's Angelina Mango and before Finland's Windows95man. After the results were announced, she finished in 17th with 54 points, with a split score of 22 points from juries and 32 points from public televoting. Regarding the former, no country gave the maximum set of 12 points; the most any country gave was five, given by Armenia and Cyprus. The song did receive a set of 12 points from public televoting, with it coming from Croatia. In response to her result, she stated in an interview with Večernje novosti that while satisfied, she had hoped for a better result.

== Track listing ==
- Digital download
1. "Ramonda" – 2:54
2. "Ramonda" (Unplugged) – 2:54

== Charts ==
Chart performance for "Ramonda"
| Chart (2024) | Peak position |
|---|---|
| Croatia (Billboard) | 19 |
| Lithuania (AGATA) | 66 |

== Release history ==
Release history and formats for "Ramonda"
| Country | Date | Format(s) | Label | Ref. |
|---|---|---|---|---|
| Various | 22 January 2024 | Digital download; streaming | PGP-RTS | |
