= Tašmajdan Sports and Recreation Center =

Multi-sport and recreational facility in Belgrade, Serbia

Tašmajdan SRC
- Taš
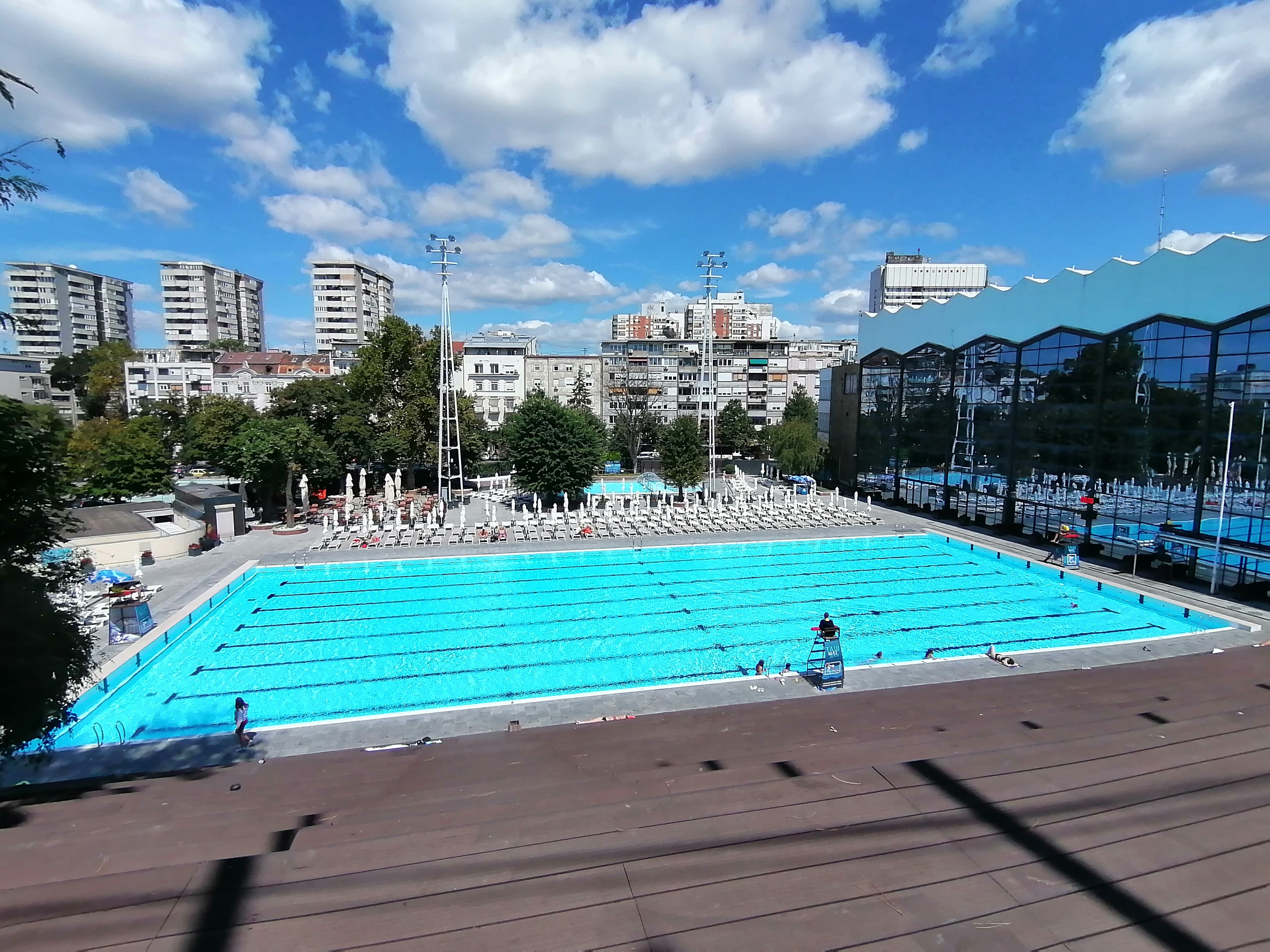
- Tašmajdan outdoor pools in August 2023.

- Location within Belgrade
- Full name: Sportsko-rekreacioni centar Tašmajdan
- Address: 26 Ilije Garašanina Street
- Location: Belgrade, Serbia
- Coordinates: 44°48′33″N 20°28′22″E
- Owner: City of Belgrade
- Operator: J.P. SRC Tašmajdan
- Capacity: 10,500 (football); 8,000 (basketball); 2,000 (ice hockey)
- Type: sports and recreation center

Construction
- Built: 1952-1954
- Opened: (Stadium) January 24, 1954; 72 years ago (Sports-recreation centre) 1958; 68 years ago
- Renovated: 2011-2016

Website
- www.tasmajdan.rs

Tašmajdan Sports and Recreation Center (Serbian: Спортско-рекреациони центар Ташмајдан, romanized: Sportsko-rekreacioni centar Tašmajdan; abbr. Tašmajdan SRC, Serbian: СРЦ Ташмајда, romanized: SRC Tašmajdan), commonly known simply as Taš (Serbian Cyrillic: Таш), is a sporting and recreational center located in the city of Belgrade, Serbia. It was founded by the Assembly of the City of Belgrade in 1958.

At within the center located of the outdoor Tašmajdan Stadium, the Aleksandar Nikolić Hall, the Pionir Ice Hall and a complex of outdoor and indoor swimming pools.

== Tašmajdan Stadium ==
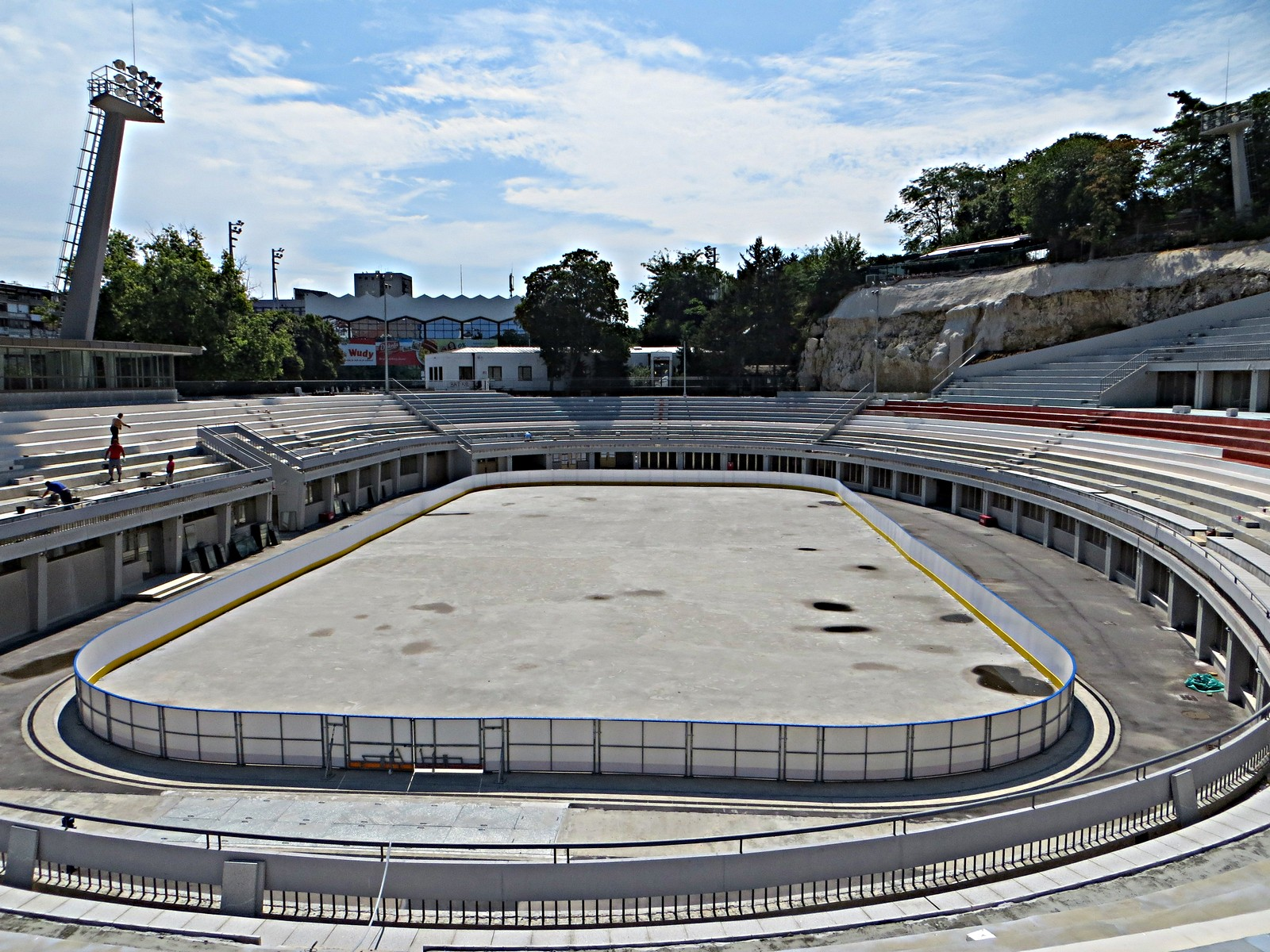
Stadion Tašmajdan

Construction of the stadium began in 1952. Built with white stone from Brač island, and opened on 24 January 1954, by mid 2000s the stadium began showing signs of structural deterioration. Architect Mihajlo Janković, was awarded the Belgrade's October award for architecture, the highest city award at the time, for the Tašmajdan project. Originally, the sports complex started as the ice factory, where people could buy the so-called "hygienic ice".

When opened, the stadium wasn't fully finished, but already in 1954 it hosted volleyball, basketball, and tennis matches. Some of the best known happenings in the venue include: EuroBasket Women 1954, first Miss Yugoslavia contest in 1957 (won by Tonka Katunarić), 1957 World Women's Handball Championship (the inaugural world women championship), concerts of Alexandrov Ensemble in 1958 and later in the 1960s and 1970s of Mazowsze, Elton John, Ray Charles and Tina Turner and ice hockey matches with over 10,000 spectators. Yugoslav national tennis team played the Davis Cup matches in 1956 in Tašmajdan and the curiosities held in the facility include the chess with live figures, the football matches played by the Zastava 750 cars and the first Spanish corrida in Europe outside of Spain, when Luis Miguel Dominguín performed in September 1971. Tašmajdan hosted the first FINA World Aquatics Championships in 1973.

After the 1977-1978 season, the ice skating rink was dismantled in March 1978. Bad conditions of the facility in the 2000s led many public personalities in Belgrade (Cane Kostić, Neda Arnerić, Branko Cvejić) to urge the city government to do something about it. In mid-April 2009, the initiative called "Taš je naš" (Serbian Cyrillic: Таш је наш; "Taš is ours") was held to draw public attention to the sad state of the crumbling facility. In the summer of 2009 the stadium was closed to the public due to the impending reconstruction. An extensive RSD550 million renovation began in September 2011. Originally, the reconstruction was to be finished in December 2012, then was postponed to 2014 and was finally completed in 2016. As the object is under the protection, the conceptual solution for the reconstruction had to fully preserve the original author's concept. Since December 2016, the ice skating rink became operational again during the winter. It covers 1,800 m^{2} (19,000 sq ft) and though it worked only for less than 60 days in 2016, it had 30,000 visitors.

== Pionir Sports Complex ==
=== Aleksandar Nikolić Hall ===
The hall, designed by Ljiljana and Dragomir Bakić, was opened on 24 May 1973 as the Pionir Hall. It was later renamed after Aleksandar Nikolić, "father of Yugoslav basketball". The interior was completely refurbished in 2019 and enlarged to 8,000 seats.

== Swimming pools ==
=== Outdoor swimming pool ===
Outdoor swimming pool
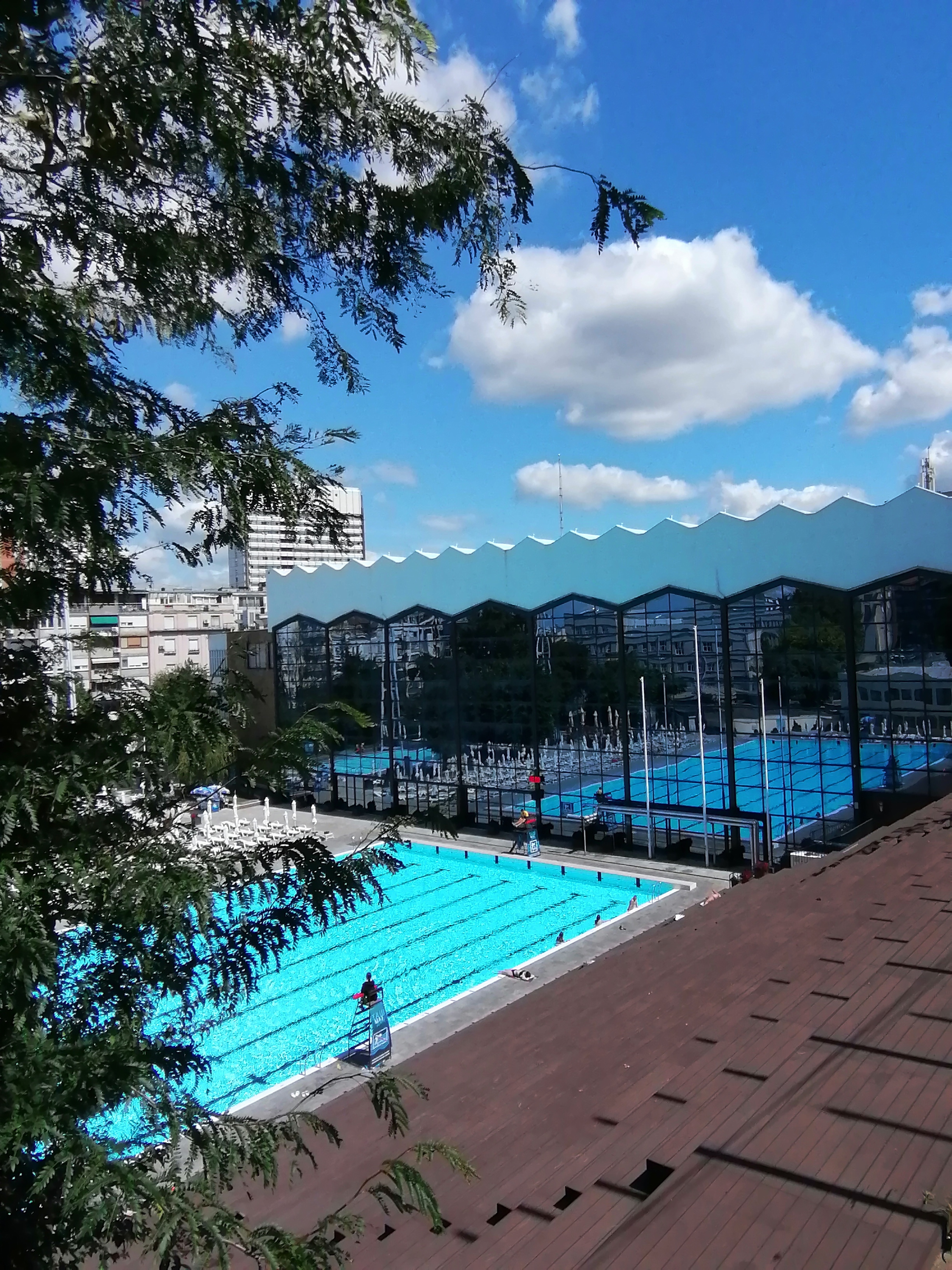
- Interactive map of Outdoor swimming pool
- Coordinates: 44°48′33.08″N 20°28′21.73″E
- Capacity: 2,500

Construction
- Opened: 25 June 1961

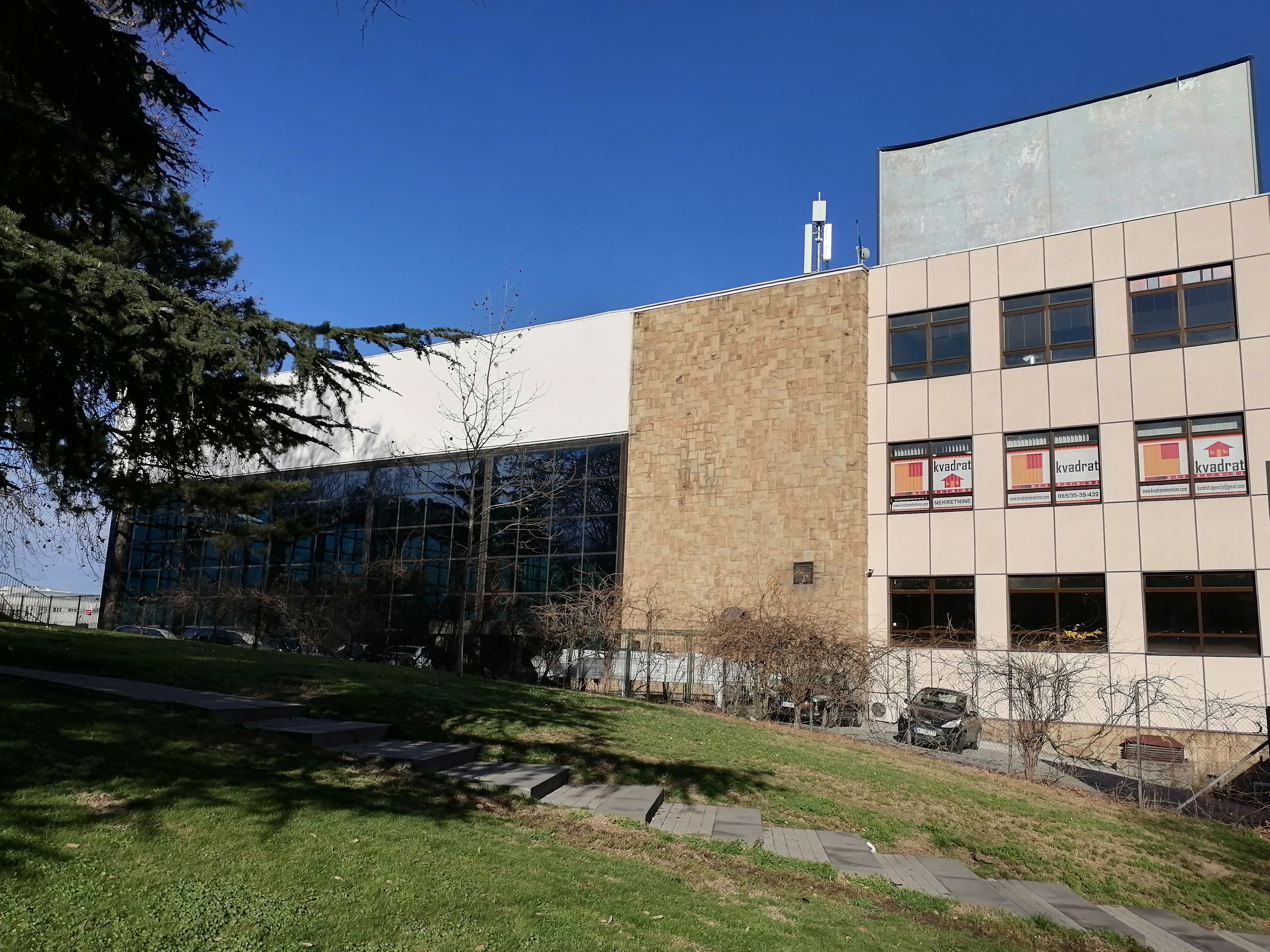
Tašmajdan Sports and Recreation Center

The outdoor swimming pool was opened on 25 June 1961. Its capacity is 2,500, and swimming beaches hold around 3,500 people, for the total of 6,000, including the activation of telescopic bleachers.

Reconstruction of the pool began on 10 March 2020, after the works on the stadium were finished. The pool will get a new, stainless steel bed, and the deepest end will be shortened from 4.8 to 2 m (15.7 to 6.6 ft), for safety and maintenance reasons, while the pool will remain eligible for all competitions. The works should be completed in June 2020.

=== Indoor swimming pool ===
Indoor swimming pool
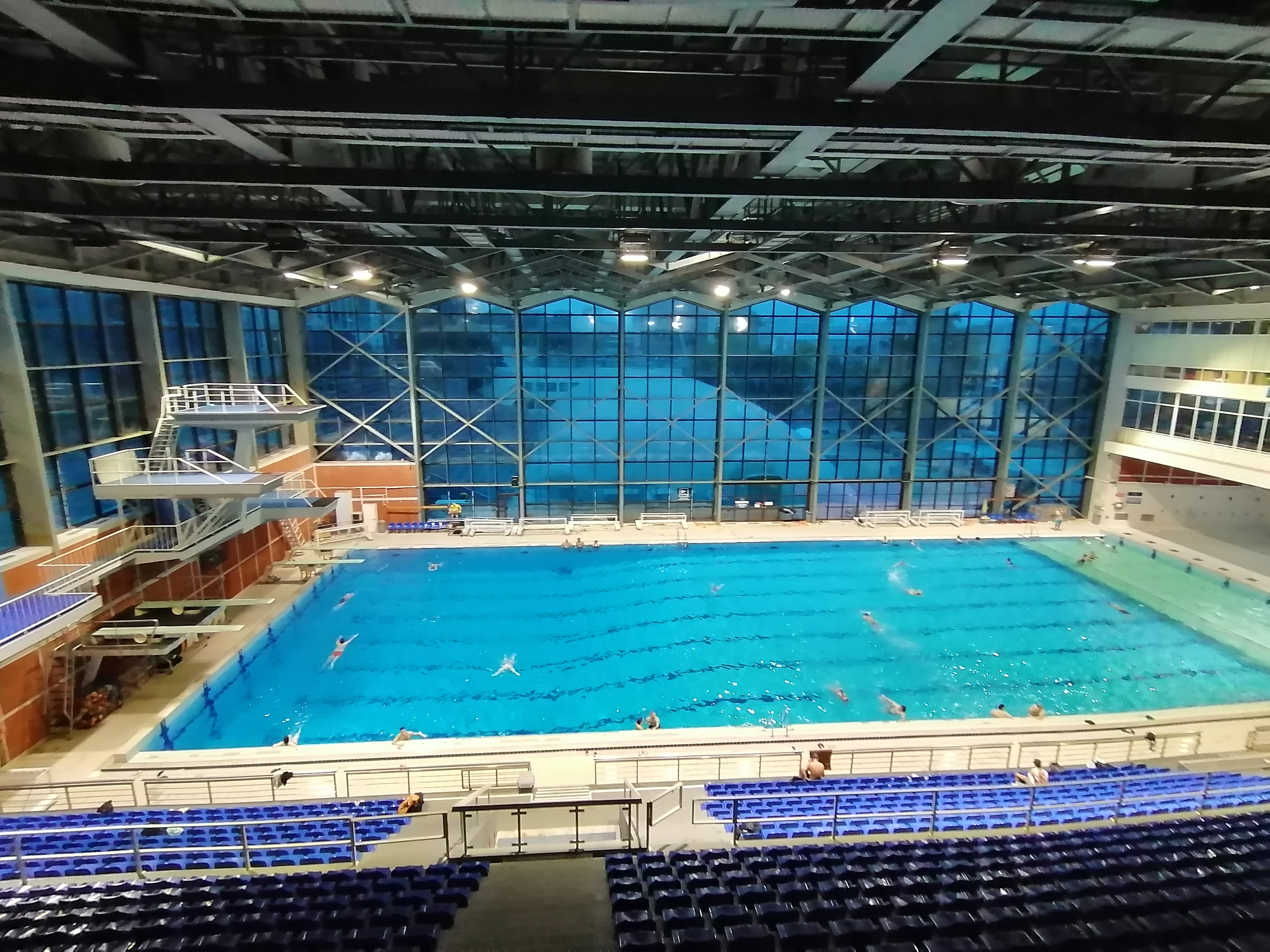
- Interactive map of Indoor swimming pool
- Coordinates: 44°48′32.87″N 20°28′23.55″E
- Capacity: 2,000

Construction
- Opened: 13 December 1968

The indoor swimming pool was opened on 13 December 1968. The pool's dimensions are 50 × 20 m. The capacity for spectators is 2,000 seats. Within the same building there is a recreation center, a gym, a small swimming pool and a hotel named Taš.

== Notable basketball matches ==
Date	Home team	Result	Away team	Occasion	Notes
29 May 1964	(Socialist Federal Republic of Yugoslavia) Belgrade Selection	51—98	(United States) NBA All-Stars	NBA All-Stars' Yugoslav Tour	— Belgrade: Slobodan Gordić (10 points), Radivoj Korać (20p), Trajko Rajković (4p), Miodrag Nikolić, Miloš Bojović (4p), Vladimir Cvetković (4p), Nemanja Đurić (9p), Dragan Kovačić, Dragoslav Ražnatović, Dragutin Čermak, Tihomir Pavlović — NBA: Bill Russell (4 points), Bob Pettit (12p), Oscar Robertson (31p), Bob Cousy (6p), Jerry Lucas (26p), Tom Heinsohn (11p), Tom Gola (8p), coach Red Auerbach — attendance: ~8,500 — referees: Miroslav Minić and Obrad Belošević (both from Belgrade) — the May–June 1964 NBA All-Stars tour in Eastern Europe and North Africa was sponsored by the U.S. State Department and the eight NBA players were briefed by the Secretary of State Dean Rusk about what to expect and how to behave in countries where "they're likely to encounter anti-American sentiment". — other than the two games in Belgrade, the NBA All-Stars tour stops in the Socialist Federal Republic of Yugoslavia included Zagreb (1 June 1964), Karlovac (2 June), and Ljubljana (4 June). — in addition to the Socialist Federal Republic of Yugoslavia, the NBA All-Stars tour included games in the Polish People's Republic, the Socialist Republic of Romania, and Egypt — 24-year-old Lokomotiva centre Dragan Kovačić played the game for the Belgrade selection despite not playing his club basketball for a Belgrade-based club nor being from Belgrade. — 25-year-old Cincinnati Royals guard Oscar Robertson was named the NBA league MVP for the just completed 1963-64 season. — 35-year-old Boston College head coach Bob Cousy had already been retired from playing pro basketball for over a year at the time of the tour, which marked his temporary comeback to playing basketball. — K.C. Jones didn't play in the first game in Belgrade.
30 May 1964	(Socialist Federal Republic of Yugoslavia) Belgrade Selection	52—100	(United States) NBA All-Stars	NBA All-Stars' Yugoslav Tour	— Belgrade: Slobodan Gordić (4 points), Radivoj Korać (16p), Nemanja Đurić (8p), Miodrag Nikolić, Josip Đerđa (6p), Dragan Kovačić (2p), Miloš Bojović (2p), Vladimir Cvetković (4p), Ratomir Vićentić, Dragoslav Ražnatović (8p), Dragutin Čermak (2p), Tihomir Pavlović — NBA: Bob Pettit (19 points), Bob Cousy (25p), Oscar Robertson (16p), Tom Heinsohn (16p), Jerry Lucas (22p), K.C. Jones (2p), coach Red Auerbach — attendance: ~5,000 — referees: Jovan Petrović and Dragaš Jakšić (both from Belgrade) — 26-year-old KK Zadar point guard Josip Đerđa played the game for the Belgrade selection despite not playing his club basketball for a Belgrade-based club nor being from Belgrade. — Bill Russell and Tom Gola picked up small knocks in the first game in Belgrade and decided to sit out the second one.

== Concerts ==
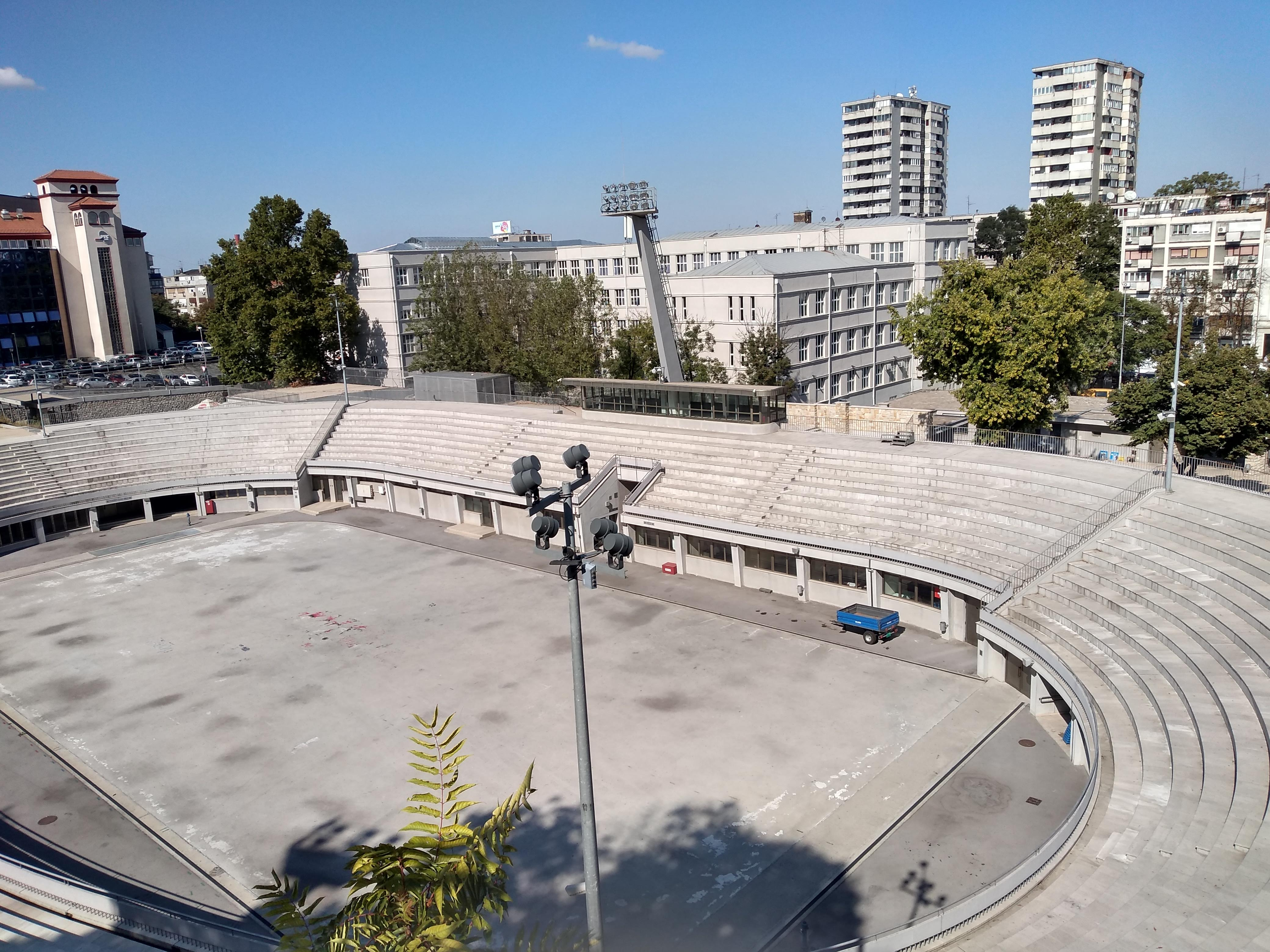
Tašmajdan Stadium in September 2019.

Over the decades, the open air stadium has hosted a variety of acts in late spring and summer from May to September:

List of concerts

1950s

- June 1955 – Big Bill Ramsay Orchestra
- 1955 – Berioska

1960s

- 1967 – Rita Pavone (opening act: Elipse)

1970s

- June 20, 1970 - Blood, Sweat & Tears (guest: Casey Anderson)
- 1970 – The Platters
- 1971 – Golden Gate Quartet
- 1972 – Juliette Gréco
- May 6, 1979 – Rock Express (Atomsko Sklonište, YU Grupa, Riblja Čorba, September)
- September 1, 1979 – Riblja Čorba ("Riblja Čorba neće da vam otima lovu – ulaz dva soma" — opening acts: Bulevar and Formula 4)

1980s

- September 12, 1981 – Aktuelna beogradska rok scena (Električni Orgazam, Fiskulturno Lane, Mali Princ, Piloti, Potop, Petar i Zli Vuci, Kazimirov Kazneni Korpus, Beograd, Psiho, UKT, Krvna Zrnca)
- September 13, 1981 – Aktuelna beogradska rok scena (Idoli, Pasta ZZ, The Fifties, Šarlo Akrobata, Doktor Spira i Ljudska Bića, Urbana Gerila, U Škripcu, VIA Talas, Radnička Kontrola, TV Moroni, Bezobrazno Zeleno)
- June 10, 1982 – Zdravko Čolić (Malo pojačaj radio Tour)
- September 11, 1982 - 2nd Belgrade Rock Festival (Radomir Mihailović Točak, Neca Falk, Tunel, and Bulevar)
- June 10, 1983 – Galija (opening acts: Potop, Kerber)
- June 8, 1985 – Bajaga i Instruktori (Sa druge strane jastuka Tour)
- June 9, 1985 – Bajaga i Instruktori
- September 14, 1985 – Plavi Orkestar (guest: Nada Obrić — Soldatski bal Tour)
- 1987 – Valentino
- June 23, 1989 – Crvena Jabuka

1990s

- September 15, 1990 – Riblja Čorba (Koza nostra Tour)
- September 13, 1991 – Džej Ramadanovski
- June 10, 1993 – Riblja Čorba
- September 17, 1993 – Ceca Veličković (guests: Viki Miljković, Dara Bubamara)
- June 13, 1994 – Lepa Brena
- September 23, 1995 - Charity concert for the fallen soldiers' families (Riblja Čorba, Babe, Dejan Cukić & Spori Ritam Band, Minđušari — guests: Momčilo Bajagić)
- June 20, 1996 – Sinan Sakić (guests: Zlata Petrović and Suzana Jovanović)
- June 29, 1996 – Partibrejkers (Najbolje od najgoreg, opening act: Love Hunters)
- September 13, 1996 – Zabranjeno Pušenje
- May 31, 1997 – Riblja Čorba (Po slobodnim gradovima Srbije Tour — opening acts: Rambo Amadeus, Prljavi Inspektor Blaža i Kljunovi, Direktori, Indijanci, Aleluja, and Kraljevski Apartman)
- June 1, 1997 – Riblja Čorba

2000s

- May 18, 2002 – Lee Scratch Perry
- May 25, 2002 – Bajaga i Instruktori (guest: Vlatko Stefanovski — opening acts: Rade Rapido, Havana Whisper, Taboo, Flare)
- June 1, 2002 – Manu Chao (Próxima Estación: Esperanza Tour)
- June 28, 2002 – Femi Kuti
- July 26, 2002 – Motörhead (opening act: Ritam Nereda)
- June 5, 2003 – OK Band
- June 12, 2003 – Magazin
- June 20, 2003 – Van Gogh (DrUnder Tour)
- June 26, 2004 – Vlado Georgiev (guest: Rambo Amadeus)
- June 27, 2004 – Earth, Wind & Fire
- June 13, 2005 – Kraftwerk
- July 2005 – Zvezde Granda 2005 Final (Milica Todorović, Aca Ranđelović, Jadranka Barjaktarović, Saša Jovanović, Jovana Pajić, and Nenad Jovanović)
- June 13, 2006 – Sisters of Mercy
- July 30, 2006 – Whitesnake (opening acts: Alogia, Kraljevski Apartman)
- August 16, 2006 – Toto (opening act: Neverne Bebe)
- September 15, 2006 – Sinan Sakić (guest: Šemsa Suljaković)
- September 16, 2006 – Rock 'n' Roll škola (Partibrejkers, Obojeni Program, Veliki Prezir, Jarboli, Neno Belan & Fiumens, Elektrobuda, Repetitor)
- June 21, 2007 – The Cult
- September 15, 2007 – Zvezde Granda 2007 Final (Dušan Svilar, Rada Manojlović, Milan Dinčić, Milan Stanković, Nemanja Stevanović, Slobodan Batjarević, and Silvija Nedeljković)
- August 29, 2008 – Sinan Sakić (guests: Vanesa Šokčić, B3, Rule)
- September 5, 2008 – Jelen Pivo Live 2008 (Iggy & The Stooges, Električni orgazam, Dinosaur Jr.)
- September 6, 2008 – Jelen Pivo Live 2008 (Strip, Shiroko, Majke, Disciplina kičme, The Lemonheads, Partibrejkers)

2010s

- April 22, 2016 – Opening of the renovated stadium (Riblja Čorba, Van Gogh, Piloti, Galija, and Električni Orgazam)
- June 11, 2016 – Prljavo Kazalište
- June 18, 2016 – Partibrejkers
- June 22, 2016 – John Newman (Belgrade Calling Festival, others: Artan Lili)
- June 23, 2016 – Simply Red (Belgrade Calling Festival, others: Jinx, Natali Dizdar)
- June 25, 2016 – Vlado Georgiev
- August 26, 2016 – "Noć muzike"
- May 27, 2017 – Dženan Lončarević (guest: Emina Jahović, Sergej Ćetković, Zorica Brunclik)
- June 3, 2017 – Sinan Sakić (guest: Muharem Serbezovski, Juice, Dragan Kojić Keba)
- June 10, 2017 – Kiki Lesendrić & Piloti
- June 15, 2017 – Darko Rundek
- June 17, 2017 – Lexington Band
- June 24, 2017 – Parni Valjak
- September 1, 2017 - "Noć muzike": The RTS Symphony Orchestra and Choir conducted by Bojan Suđić
- June 1, 2018 – Lexington Band, Dženan Lončarević and Projekat Band (Impero Music Week, pop music night)
- June 2, 2018 – YU Grupa, Kerber and Neverne Bebe (Impero Music Week, rock music night)
- June 3, 2018 – Moby Dick, Gru, Dr Iggy, Beat Street, Ivan Gavrilović, B3 and DJ Djuka (Impero Music Week, 90s music night)
- June 23, 2018 – Jala Brat & Buba Corelli (guests: Milan Stanković, Maya Berović)
- June 25, 2018 – Željko Joksimović
- June 30, 2018 – Dubioza kolektiv
- August 31, 2018 – "Noć muzike": Carmina Burana performed by The RTS Symphony Orchestra and Choir conducted by Bojan Suđić
- May 25, 2019 – Nele Karajlić
- June 22, 2019 – Tony Cetinski
- June 26, 2019 – Thievery Corporation
- June 27, 2019 – Whitesnake

2020s

- September 18, 2020 – Bajaga i Instruktori (no crowd, Ovaj svet se menja promotion)
- July 16, 2021 – Bajaga i Instruktori
- August 16, 2021 – Riblja Čorba i prijatelji (Honouring Miša Aleksić, guests: Momčilo Bajagić, Dragi Jelić, Žika Jelić, Nikola Čuturilo, Zvonimir Đukić)
- August 21, 2021 – Hladno Pivo (opening act: Raskid13)
- September 1, 2021 – "Noć muzike"
- September 4, 2021 – Partibrejkers
- September 8, 2021 – Plácido Domingo
- September 17, 2021 – Kakva ti je žena, takav ti je život by Dragan "Maca" Marinković
- September 18, 2021 – Massimo Savić (opening act: Vatra)
- September 19, 2021 – Vlatko Stefanovski & V3 Trio
- June 6, 2022 – Beogradski Sindikat
- June 21, 2022 – Rock El Clásico: Stefan Milenkovich vs. Nele Karajlić
- June 28, 2022 – Zorica Brunclik i prijatelji (guests: Zorica Marković, Nada Topčagić, Marija Šerifović, Mira Škorić, Mile Kitić)
- July 2, 2022 – Five Finger Death Punch (opening act: Solence)
- July 11, 2022 – Wardruna
- August 29, 2022 – Pixies (opening act: The Slow Show)
- September 10, 2022 – YU Grupa (50th Anniversary, guests: Zvonimir Đukić, Bora Đorđević, Tihomir Pop Asanović, Nikola Čuturilo, Dejan Cukić, Zele Lipovača, Momčilo Bajagić, Milovan Đuđić, Aleksa Jelić, Vlatko Stefanovski, Saša Lokner, Dado Topić, Bruno Langer, Aleksandra Đelmaš, David Micić)
- May 20, 2023 – ABBA Symphonic Real Tribute Show (guests: The Zrenjanin Philharmonic)
- May 24, 2023 – Lord of the Dance
- June 17, 2023 – Tea Tairović (Na jednu noć Tour, guest: Sanja Vučić)
- June 24, 2023 – Baja Mali Knindža
- June 29, 2023 – Nikos Vertis (guest: Saša Kovačević)
- July 3, 2023 – Nemanja Radulović & Double Sens
- September 9, 2023 – Jašar Ahmedovski
- September 16, 2023 – Buč Kesidi (guests: Bojana Vunturišević, Džipsii, Pocket Palma, Vlado Georgiev)
- July 13, 2024 – Deep Purple
- August 30, 2024 – Senidah
- September 4, 2024 – Nikos Vertis (guest: Lepa Brena)
- September 7, 2024 – Scott Bradlee's Postmodern Jukebox
- September 13, 2024 – Zemfira
- June 12, 2026 – "Veče '90-ih" (Funky G, Moby Dick, Dr Iggy, Ivan Gavrilović)
- June 13, 2026 – Ćana
- June 26, 2026 – Južni Vetar Festival
- June 27, 2026 – Južni Vetar Festival
- July 3, 2026 – Milanče Radosavljević

== Other ==
- June 4–13, 1954 – EuroBasket Women 1954
- July 13–20, 1957 – 1957 World Women's Handball Championship
- September 8, 1981 – Jeux sans frontières (Inter-European game show, 1981 International Final)
- June 1, 2013 – 2012–13 LEN Champions League Final Four (VK Crvena zvezda won the title in front of 4,000 fans)

Preceded by Pionir Hall	Zvezde Granda; Final Venue; 2005, 2007	Succeeded by Belgrade Arena
