= Ana Stanić discography =

Ana Stanić Serbia discography
- Studio albums: 5
- Singles: 18
- Music videos: 14

This page includes the discography of the Serbian artist Ana Stanić.

== Albums ==
=== Studio albums ===
Year	Album
1998	"Metar iznad asfalta": 1st studio album; Languages: Serbian; Publisher: PGP-RTS
1999	"Vidim te kad": 2nd studio album; Languages: Serbian; Publisher: PGP-RTS
2002	"Tri": 3rd studio album; Languages: Serbian; Publisher: PGP-RTS
2004	"U ogledalu": 4th studio album; Languages: Serbian; Publisher: City Records
2008	"Sudar": 5th studio album; Languages: Serbian; Publisher: PGP-RTS
2015	"Priča Za Pamćenje": 6th studio album; Languages: Serbian; Publisher: Mascom Records

=== Compilation albums ===
Year	Album
1999	"Ana Stanić": 1st compilation album; Languages: Serbian; Publisher: Automatic Records

== Singles ==
Year	Single	Chart positions		Album
Year	Single	RS	EU	Album
1997	"Molila sam anđele"			Metar iznad asfalta
1998	"Točkovi"			Metar iznad asfalta
1998	"Grad"			Metar iznad asfalta
1998	"Sama"			Metar iznad asfalta
1999	"Vidim te kad..."			Vidim te kad
1999	"Skrivanje"			Vidim te kad
2000	"Taj koji zna"			Vidim te kad
2002	"20,30 godina"			Tri
2002	"Ako živiš za mene"			Tri
2004	"Pogrešan"			U ogledalu
2004	"Trag ljubomore"			U ogledalu
2004	"Veliko A"			U ogledalu
2005	"Nađi me"			U ogledalu
2006	"Udahni me"			Sudar
2007	"Luda"			Sudar
2008	"Više nisi moj" (ft. Sky Wikluh)			Sudar
2008	"Ljubav do neba"			Sudar
2009	"I to je ljubav"			Sudar

== Music videos ==
- 1997 - "Molila sam anđele"
- 1998 - "Točkovi"
- 1998 - "Grad"
- 1998 - "Sama"
- 1999 - "Vidim te kad..."
- 1999 - "Skrivanje"
- 2000 - "Taj koji zna"
- 2002 - "20,30 godina"
- 2004 - "Pogrešan"
- 2004 - "Trag ljubomore"
- 2006 - "Udahni me"
- 2007 - "Luda"
- 2008 - "Više nisi moj"
- 2008 - "Ljubav do neba"
- 2009 - "I to je ljubav"
- 2012 - "Panika"
- 2014 - "Neka gori sve"
