= Sudar =

Sudar may refer to:

- Sudar (surname), a surname found in Croatia and Hungary
- Sudar (album), a 2008 album by Serbian pop singer Ana Stanić
