= Tea Tairović discography =

- Studio albums: 6
- Singles: 24
- Music videos: 93
- Promotional singles: 3

Serbian singer and songwriter Tea Tairović has released six studio albums, 24 singles (including four as a featured artist), three promotional singles and 93 music videos.

== Albums ==
=== Studio albums ===
List of studio albums, showing release date, label, chart positions and track listing
Title	Details	Peak chart positions		Notes
Title	Details	AUT	SWI	Notes
Balkanija	Released: 21 May 2022; Label: T Music; Format: CD, digital download, streaming	—	—	Track listing: | No. | Title | Length | |---|---|---| | 1. | "Balkanija" | 3:39 | | 2. | "Boy Boy" | 3:54 | | 3. | "Neka pati ona" | 3:37 | | 4. | "Dva i dva" | 3:12 | | 5. | "Dubai" | 3:04 | | 6. | "Preživeću" | 3:32 | | 7. | "Malo mi je" | 3:48 | | 8. | "Kučke i demoni" | 3:36 | | 9. | "Pijan" | 3:47 | | Total length: | | 32:13 |
Balerina	Released: 16 May 2023; Label: T Music; Format: Digital download, streaming	17	79	Track listing: | No. | Title | Length | |---|---|---| | 1. | "Balerina" (featuring Voyage) | 2:34 | | 2. | "Bibi Habibi" | 2:34 | | 3. | "Izrael i Palestina" | 3:37 | | 4. | "Dva i dva" | 2:56 | | 5. | "Da si najbolji" | 3:10 | | 6. | "Crno odelo" | 3:54 | | 7. | "Ne brini majko" | 3:48 | | 8. | "Budalo" | 3:33 | | 9. | "Preterala" | 2:48 | | 10. | "Ljubavnica" | 3:03 | | Total length: | | 30:52 |
Tea	Released: 1 June 2024; Label: T Music; Format: Digital download, streaming	39	—	Track listing: | No. | Title | Length | |---|---|---| | 1. | "Zbogom ljubavi" | 3:01 | | 2. | "Bakšiš" | 3:11 | | 3. | "Pozovi" | 3:00 | | 4. | "Tea" | 2:14 | | 5. | "Pec" | 3:00 | | 6. | "Naivčina" | 3:50 | | 7. | "Titanik" | 3:52 | | 8. | "TeaNucci" (with Nucci) | 2:14 | | 9. | "Ola" | 2:19 | | 10. | "Nek ti je srećno" | 3:39 | | 11. | "Udri" | 2:47 | | 12. | "Ime mi je ljubav" | 3:17 | | 13. | "Veštice" | 2:57 | | Total length: | | 39:25 |
Aska	Released: 6 May 2025; Label: T Music; Format: Digital download, streaming	35	—	Track listing: | No. | Title | Length | |---|---|---| | 1. | "Halo, ovde đavo" | 2:45 | | 2. | "Majka kuka" | 3:00 | | 3. | "Çok güzel" | 2:33 | | 4. | "Aska" | 3:11 | | 5. | "Ljubomorna" | 3:22 | | 6. | "Ciganče" | 3:35 | | 7. | "Ker finansijer" | 2:53 | | 8. | "Da overim" | 2:06 | Bonus track | No. | Title | Length | |---|---|---| | 9. | "Vidimo se nikad" | 3:09 | | Total length: | | 26:34 |
Aska II	Released: 2 December 2025; Label: T Music; Format: Digital download, streaming	—	—	Track listing: | No. | Title | Length | |---|---|---| | 1. | "To mama voli" | 2:09 | | 2. | "Da ti igram" | 1:37 | | 3. | "Kazni ga, nek' pati" | 3:59 | | 4. | "Santa leda" (with Barbara Bobak) | 2:57 | | 5. | "Severna Latina" | 2:15 | | 6. | "Nemam ja godine" | 3:05 | | 7. | "Hoću sa njim" | 2:51 | | 8. | "Oprostite sudija" | 2:58 | | 9. | "Vino" | 2:26 | | 10. | "Sheki" | 2:39 | | Total length: | | 26:56 |
Dominantna	Released: 13 May 2026; Label: T Music; Format: Digital download, streaming	—	—	Track listing: | No. | Title | Length | |---|---|---| | 1. | "Bonita" | 3:00 | | 2. | "Ritam Balkan" | 2:08 | | 3. | "Kuća, kola, stan" | 3:09 | | 4. | "Dominantna" | 2:51 | | 5. | "Plavo more" | 3:12 | | 6. | "Puče puška" | 3:40 | | 7. | "Sagapo" | 2:44 | | Total length: | | 20:44 |
"—" denotes a recording that did not chart or was not released in that territory.

== Singles ==
=== As lead artist ===
List of singles as lead artist, showing year released, chart positions, certifications and album name
Title	Year	Peak chart positions	Album
Title	Year	CRO Billb.	Album
"Da si moj"	2014	(Note: Croatia Songs was launched on 15 February 2022.)	Non-album singles
"Igračica"	2017	(Note: Croatia Songs was launched on 15 February 2022.)	Non-album singles
"Nevolja"	2017	(Note: Croatia Songs was launched on 15 February 2022.)	Non-album singles
"Otkad tebe znam" (featuring Šaban Šaulić)	2017	(Note: Croatia Songs was launched on 15 February 2022.)	Non-album singles
"Drama" (featuring Menil Velioski)	2017	(Note: Croatia Songs was launched on 15 February 2022.)	Non-album singles
"I u dobru i u zlu"	2017	(Note: Croatia Songs was launched on 15 February 2022.)	Non-album singles
"Brat na brata" (with Ivana Krunić)	2018	(Note: Croatia Songs was launched on 15 February 2022.)	Non-album singles
"Polako"	2019	(Note: Croatia Songs was launched on 15 February 2022.)	Non-album singles
"Mala" (with Tozla)	2019	(Note: Croatia Songs was launched on 15 February 2022.)	Non-album singles
"Dolce i Gabbana"	2019	(Note: Croatia Songs was launched on 15 February 2022.)	Non-album singles
"Svetica"	2020	(Note: Croatia Songs was launched on 15 February 2022.)	Non-album singles
"Hajde"	2021	21	Non-album singles
"Na jednu noć"	2021	11	Non-album singles
"Abracadabra" (with Galena)	2023	—	Non-album singles
"100%"	2023	—	Non-album singles
"Tea"	2024	—	Tea
"Katastrofa" (with Azis)	2024	—	Non-album singles
"More bez brodova"	2024	—	Non-album singles
"Šamar" (with Dado Polumenta)	2026	—	Non-album singles
"Golube"	2026	—	Non-album singles
"—" denotes a recording that did not chart.

=== As featured artist ===
List of singles as featured artist, showing year released, chart positions, certifications and album name
Title	Year	Album
"Idu dani" (Rimski featuring Tea Tairović)	2017	Non-album singles
"Medikament" (DJ Shone featuring Tea Tairović)	2018	Non-album singles
"Zdravo doviđenja" (Peđa London featuring Tea Tairović)	2019	Non-album singles
"Samo moj" (Monika featuring Tea Tairović)	2019	Non-album singles

=== Promotional singles ===
List of promotional singles, showing year released, chart positions and album name
Title	Year	Album
"Novogodišnji mix"	2021	Non-album singles
"Plakala bih i bez suza"	2022	Non-album singles
"Balerina MIX"	2023	Non-album singles

== Other charted songs ==
List of songs, with selected chart positions and certifications, showing year released and album name
Title	Year	Peak chart positions		Album
Title	Year	AUT	CRO Billb.	Album
"Dva i dva"	2022	—	7	Balkanija
"Dubai"	2022	—	17	Balkanija
"Balerina" (featuring Voyage)	2023	—	2	Balerina
"Izrael i Palestina"	2023	—	4	Balerina
"Bibi Habibi"	2023	—	6	Balerina
"Da si najbolji"	2023	—	15	Balerina
"TeaNucci" (with Nucci)	2024	—	4	Tea
"Çok güzel"	2025	35	3	Aska
"Ker finansijer"	2025	—	19	Aska
"Halo, ovde đavo"	2025	—	24	Aska
"Severna Latina"	2025	—	11	Aska II
"Bonita"	2026	—	13	Dominantna

== Guest appearances ==
List of non-single guest appearances, with other performing artists, showing year released and album name
Title	Year	Other artist(s)	Album
"Karakterna osobina"	2015	none	Non-album song
"Meni odgovara"	2016	none	Zvezde Granda – 2016
"Bliznakinja"	2019	none	Grand novogodišnji hitovi
"Marrakesh-Dubai"	2024	Sanja Vučić	Makadam

== Songwriting credits ==
List of songs written or co-written for other artists, showing year released and album name
Title	Year	Artist(s)	Album	Role(s)
"Nay-dobrata, eto"	2019	Maria	Non-album songs	Composer
"Hajde komandante"	2022	Olja Bajrami	Non-album songs	Composer; lyricist
"Umri do zore"	2024	Seka Aleksić	Trilogy	Composer; lyricist
"Ti i ja"	2024	Seka Aleksić	Trilogy	Composer; lyricist
"Eminentna dama"	2024	Seka Aleksić	Trilogy 2	Lyricist
"Na kolene"	2025	Bilyanish and Donika	Non-album songs	Co-composer
"Mazohistka"	2025	Selina	Non-album songs	Co-composer
"Džek"	2025	Toxic Band	Non-album songs	Composer; lyricist
"Supermen"	2025	Lapsus Band	Non-album songs	Lyricist
"Halo halo"	2025	Barbara Bobak	Blizanac	Composer; lyricist
"Ela ela"	2026	Sanja Vučić	Non-album song	Composer; co-lyricist

== Music videos ==
List of music videos, showing year released and directors
Title	Year	Director(s)
"Da si moj"	2014	Videopolis
"Karakterna osobina"	2015	Miodrag Grujičić
"Meni odgovara"	2016	David Ljubenović
"Igračica"	2017	David Ljubenović
"Nevolja"	2017	Jasmin Pivić
"Otkad tebe znam" (featuring Šaban Šaulić)	2017	Marko Todorović
"Idu dani" (Rimski featuring Tea Tairović)	2017	Boris Zec
"Drama" (featuring Menil Velioski)	2017	Silver Production
"I u dobru i u zlu"	2017	Silver Production
"Brat na brata" (with Ivana Krunić)	2018	Stanko Vučićević
"Medikament" (DJ Shone featuring Tea Tairović)	2018	Shone Entertainment Video
"Polako"	2019	David Mićić
"Mala" (with Tozla)	2019	Marko Todorović
"Kad iz oka suza kane" (Cover)	2019	Igor X
"Zdravo doviđenja" (Peđa London featuring Tea Tairović)	2019	David Ljubenović
"Dolce i Gabbana"	2019	David Mićić
"Samo moj" (Monika featuring Tea Tairović)	2019	DM Sat Production
"Bliznakinja"	2019	David Mićić
"Igračica" (Cover)	2020	Igor X
"Svetica"	2020	David Mićić
"Ne zaboravi me" (Cover)	2020	Igor X
"Branim" / "De fevgo" (Cover)	2020	Igor X
"Hajde"	2021	David Mićić
"Na jednu noć"	2021	David Mićić
"Novogodišnji mix"	2021	David Mićić
"Žao mi je, žao" (Cover)	2022	David Mićić
"Balkanija"	2022	David Mićić
"Boy Boy"	2022	David Mićić
"Neka pati ona"	2022	David Mićić
"Dva i dva"	2022	David Mićić
"Dubai"	2022	David Mićić
"Preživeću"	2022	David Mićić
"Malo mi je"	2022	David Mićić
"Kučke i demoni"	2022	David Mićić
"Pijan"	2022	David Mićić
"Balkanija mix"	2022	Nemanja Novaković
"Plakala bih i bez suza" (Cover)	2022	Nemanja Novaković
"Balerina" (featuring Voyage)	2023	Nemanja Novaković
"Bibi Habibi"	2023	Andrija Grkić
"Izrael i Palestina"	2023	Nemanja Novaković
"Da si najbolji"	2023	Nemanja Novaković
"Crno odelo"	2023	Nemanja Novaković
"Daj daj"	2023	Nemanja Novaković
"Ne brini majko"	2023	Nemanja Novaković
"Budalo"	2023	Nemanja Novaković
"Preterala"	2023	David Mićić
"Ljubavnica"	2023	David Mićić
"Abracadabra" (with Galena)	2023	Viktor Antonov
"Balerina MIX"	2023	Nemanja Novaković
"100%"	2023	Nemanja Novaković
"Zbogom ljubavi"	2024	Iris Janković
"Bakšiš"	2024	Andrija Grkić
"Pozovi"	2024	Andrija Grkić; Nemanja Novaković
"Tea"	2024	unknown
"Pec"	2024	Ivan Dimitrov
"Naivčina"	2024	Andrija Grkić; Nemanja Novaković
"Titanik"	2024	Ivan Dimitrov
"TeaNucci" (with Nucci)	2024	Milutin Milošević
"Ola"	2024	Ivan Dimitrov
"Nek ti je srećno"	2024	Andrija Grkić; Nemanja Novaković
"Udri"	2024	Ivan Dimitrov
"Ime mi je ljubav"	2024	Milutin Milošević
"Veštice"	2024	Milutin Milošević
"Marrakesh-Dubai" (with Sanja Vučić)	2024	Đorđe Jovčić
"Katastrofa" (with Azis)	2024	Ivan Dimitrov
"More bez brodova"	2024	David Mićić
"Halo, ovde đavo"	2025	Ivan Dimitrov
"Majka kuka"	2025	Nemanja Novaković
"Çok güzel"	2025	Ivan Dimitrov
"Aska"	2025	Ivan Dimitrov
"Ljubomorna"	2025	Ivan Dimitrov
"Ciganče"	2025	Ivan Dimitrov
"Ker finansijer"	2025	Ivan Dimitrov
"Da overim"	2025	David Mićić
"To mama voli"	2025	Nemanja Novaković
"Da ti igram"	2025	Nemanja Novaković
"Kazni ga, nek' pati"	2025	Nemanja Novaković
"Santa leda" (with Barbara Bobak)	2025	Nemanja Novaković
"Severna Latina"	2025	Nemanja Novaković
"Nemam ja godine"	2025	Nemanja Novaković
"Hoću sa njim"	2025	Nemanja Novaković
"Oprostite, sudija"	2025	Nemanja Novaković
"Vino"	2025	Nemanja Novaković
"Sheki"	2025	David Mićić
"Šamar" (with Dado Polumenta)	2026	Ivan Dimitrov
"Bonita"	2026	Ivan Dimitrov
"Ritam Balkan"	2026	Ivan Dimitrov
"Kuća, kola, stan"	2026	Ivan Dimitrov
"Dominantna"	2026	Ivan Dimitrov
"Plavo more"	2026	Ivan Dimitrov
"Puče puška"	2026	Ivan Dimitrov
"Sagapo"	2026	David Mićić
"Golube"	2026	David Mićić
