= Darko Lazić =

Darko Lazić may refer to:

- Darko Lazić (singer), Serbian singer
- Darko Lazić (footballer), Serbian footballer
