= Dinčić =

Dinčić (Serbian Cyrillic: Динчић) is a Serbo-Croatian surname. It may refer to:

- Frano Menegello Dinčić (1900–1986), Yugoslav medalist and sculptor
- Milan Dinčić, Serbian singer from Zvezde Granda talent show
- Slobodan Dinčić (born 1982), Serbian footballer
- Virgil Meneghello Dinčić (1876–1944), Croatian painter and art teacher

== See also ==
- Dinkić
