= Voyage (rapper) =

Serbian singer, media personality and actor (born 2001)

Voyage Војаж
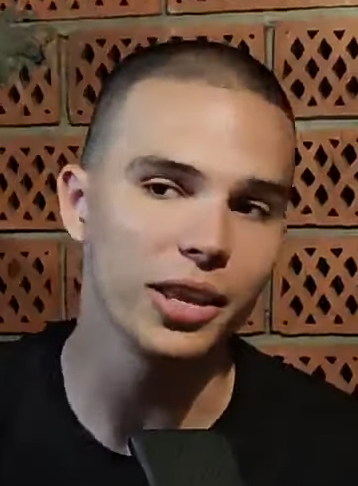
- Voyage in 2021

Background information
- Also known as: Vojaž
- Born: Mihajlo Veruović; 15 September 2001 (age 25); Belgrade, Serbia, FR Yugoslavia
- Genre: Trap
- Occupations: Singer; rapper; actor
- Years active: 2015–present
- Labels: Die Rich; Generacija Zed; IDJTunes
- Partner: Breskvica (2019–2021)

Mihajlo Veruović (Serbian Cyrillic: Михајло Веруoвић) (born 15 September 2001), better known as Voyage (Serbian Cyrillic: Војаж, romanized: Vojaž), is a Serbian singer, rapper, and actor.

He made his recording debut in 2015 and released his first studio album Porok i greh in 2019. Voyage rose to mainstream prominence after the release of the single "Vrati me" (2019) with his ex-girlfriend Breskvica. Apart from his music career, he has starred in the television series U klinču since 2022.

== Early life ==
Mihajlo Veruović was born on 15 September 2001 in Belgrade, FR Yugoslavia. His mother Žana is a medical worker, whilst his father, Milan, served as the bodyguard to Prime Minister Zoran Đinđić. Following the 2003 assassination of Đinđić, Veruović and his family fled to Strasbourg, France, where they lived until Mihajlo turned eight. His stage name "Voyage" (French for "journey") comes from these events.

According to Veruović, his initial interest in music happened during primary school, when he started writing songs with his childhood friends. They subsequently formed a music collective called Company. Veruović graduated from the Ninth Belgrade Gymnasium.

== Career ==
=== 2015–2020: Beginnings and collaboration with Breskvica ===
Voyage released his first song and music video, titled "Priđi bliže", as a member of Company in 2015. The collective released several other songs before their eventual disbandment. His first studio album, titled Porok i greh, was released in April 2019 under Die Rich record label, in collaboration with the recording artist Andre. Afterwards, Voyage began releasing songs under Generacija Zed. His first significant success came in May with "Otrovan", which was a collaboration with artist Henny. Voyage released his solo debut album So Fxcking Blessed in September 2019.

In 2019, Voyage also began working together with his girlfriend Breskvica, releasing viral songs "Vrati me" and "Budi tu" in September and November, respectively. Their collaboration with rapper Vuk Mob "Koraci u noći", released in December 2019, has amassed over 47 million views on YouTube. In January the following year, Voyage and Breskvica saw mainstream media attention after their appearance on the late-night talk show Ami G Show, mainly due to his attitude and the live performance of "Budi tu", which were perceived badly. Nevertheless, the duo continued successfully releasing singles until January 2021 when they ended their relationship. Among other songs, Voyage and Breskvica also had a duet with Tanja Savić, titled "Pancir", in November 2020, which has collected over 47 million views.

=== 2021–present: Europol and U klinču ===
Following his breakup with Breskvica, Voyage released his first solo single in April 2021, titled "Pleši", featuring British rapper J Fado. It was released as a part of the soundtrack to the movie Južni vetar 2: Ubrzanje. In July, he collaborated with Greek rapper Snik on the single "Bounce", which topped the IFPI Greece Digital Singles Chart and has been certified 2× platinum. Subsequently, he worked with Rasta on "Aman" and Nucci on "Balkan". In August, Voyage headlined the Music Week Festival in Ušće, Belgrade. Later in November, he toured the United States along with trap musicians Nucci, Corona and Rimski.

In March 2022, Voyage released "Detinjstvo" as the first single from his album Europol. He had his first chart-topping single with "Gad" featuring Nucci, released in May 2022. It was followed by two more consecutive number one singles: "Tango" and "London" featuring Elena Kitić. In August 2022, Veruović joined the cast of the television series U klinču, broadcast by Radio Television of Serbia, along with Nikola Kojo and Branka Katić in the lead roles. Later that year, he also collaborated with Rasta and Darko Lazić on "Pismo" and released his solo single "La La La", which peaked at number 4 and 1 in Serbia.

Voyage and Nucci released "Bella Hadid" in January 2023, which ranked first in Serbia. On 26 January, Voyage and Mimi Mercedez hosted the 2023 Music Awards Ceremony at the Belgrade Arena. During the ceremony, he and Nucci performed a medley of their hits. The same year on 6 May, Serbian singer Tea Tairović released single "Balerina", a collaboration with Voyage, as part of her second studio album of the same name. In a June interview with Extra FM, Voyage revealed that the release of Europol was cancelled due to the leak of unreleased album tracks. In August 2023, Voyage and Nucci announced their first concert at the Port of Belgrade for 6 October, entitled Balkan Daje Sve (Balkan Gives it All), after a verse from their duet "Balkan".

On 26 January, Voyage and Mimi Mercedez hosted the 2023 Music Awards Ceremony at the Belgrade Arena. During the event, him and Nucci also performed a medley of their hits. On 6 October 2023, Balkan Daje Sve was held. The following year, on 14 June, Voyage released his first major-label studio album, Guns n' Roses, under IDJTunes. Among other tracks, the release also included the duet "Muškarčina" (lit. 'Hunk') with Ceca.

== Public image ==
In September 2021, Voyage participated in a public campaign organized by the City of Belgrade to stimulate vaccination against COVID-19, stating: "Vaccination is a socially responsible decision everyone should do, but we cannot persuade anyone to do it". Moreover, he also said that his advocacy was influenced by his mother, who worked as a frontline medical worker during the pandemic.

In October 2021, Voyage voiced his opinions about homosexuality on Instagram, which was praised as an example of a "rare open and unambiguous" public support to the LGBT community in Serbia.

== Personal life ==
Voyage was in a relationship with compatriot Breskvica. The couple broke up in January 2021 after two years of dating.

== Discography ==
=== Albums ===
- Porok i greh (2019); feat. Andre
- So Fxcking Blessed (2019)
- Balkan EP (2021)
- Europol (2022)
- Guns n' Roses (2024)
- Promene (2026)

=== Singles ===
==== As lead artist ====
Title	Year	Peak chart positions					Certifications	Album
Title	Year	AUT	AUT Billb.	CRO Billb.	GRE	SWI	Certifications	Album
"Sećanja" (with Henny)	2019	—	*	*	—	—		Non-album singles
"Trebala" (featuring MihaMih)	2019	—	*	*	—	—		Non-album singles
"Vrati me" (featuring Breskvica)	2019	—	*	*	—	—		Non-album singles
"Budi tu" (featuring Breskvica)	2019	—	*	*	—	—		Non-album singles
"Koraci u noći" (with Vuk Mob and Breskvica)	2019	—	*	*	—	—		Non-album singles
"C'est la vie" (with Breskvica)	2020	—	*	*	—	—		Non-album singles
"Dam" (featuring Breskvica)	2020	—	*	*	—	—		Non-album singles
"Bezimena" (featuring Breskvica)	2020	—	*	*	—	—		Non-album singles
"Pancir" (with Breskvica featuring Tanja Savić)	2020	—	*	*	—	—		Non-album singles
"Anđele" (with no Breskvica)	2020	—	*	*	—	—		Non-album singles
"Beli grad" (with Breskvica)	2021	—	*	*	—	—		Non-album singles
"Pleši" (with J Fado)	2021	51	*	*	—	—		Non-album singles
"Kartel"	2021	—	*	*	—	—		Non-album singles
"Bounce" (with Snik)	2021	—	*	*	—	—		Non-album singles
"Aman" (with Rasta)	2021	—	*	*	—	—		Non-album singles
"Balkan" (with Nucci)	2021	—	*	*	—	—		Non-album singles
"Euforija"	2021	36	*	*	—	—		Non-album singles
"Uloge"	2021	—	*	*	—	—		Non-album singles
"Detinjstvo"	2022	43	—	9	—	—		Europol
"Gad" (with Nucci)	2022	21	8	1	—	—		Europol
"Tango"	2022	30	15	1	—	—		Europol
"London" (with Elena)	2022	29	22	1	—	—		Europol
"I miei amici" (with Niko Panddeta)	2022	—	—	—	—	—		Ricorso inammissibile
"Pismo" (with Darko Lazić and Rasta)	2022	—	—	4	—	—		Non-album single
"La La La"	2022	31	23	1	—	—		Europol
"Bella Hadid" (with Nucci)	2023	49	—	2	—	—		Europol
"Mafia" (with Devito)	2023	66	—	6	—	—		Non-album singles
"Blue Racks" (with Pajel)	2023	—	—	—	—	—		Non-album singles
"Svrati"	2023	18	10	1	—	72		Non-album singles
"Block Life" (with Mero)	2023	72	—	14	—	—		Non-album singles
"Periferija" (with Nucci)	2023	—	—	—	—	—		Non-album singles
"OAED" (Remix) (with Snik and Toquel featuring Ivan Greko)	2024	—	—	—	1	—	IFPI GRE: Gold	Non-album singles
"Amsterdam" (with Biba)	2024	—	—	4	—	—		Non-album singles
"Muškarčina" (with Ceca)	2024	—	—	6	—	—		Guns n' Roses
"VVS" (with Baka Prase)	2024	—	—	8	—	—		Non-album singles
"Divlja" (with Teodora)	2025	—	—	—	—	—		Non-album singles
"Od vina"	2025	—	—	—	—	—		Damir Handanović – Novi zvuk
"Tajne u ogledalu"	2025	—	—	—	—	—		Non-album singles
"Đavole" (with Edita)	2025	—	—	21	—	—		Non-album singles
"Varnice"	2026	—	—	—	—	—		Non-album singles
"Srce puca" (with Rimski and Corona)	2026	—	—	—	—	—		Promene
"Bez tebe"	2026	—	—	—	—	—		Promene
"—" denotes a single that did not chart or was not released in that territory. "*" denotes a single that was released before the chart launch.

==== As featured artist ====
Title	Year	Peak chart positions		Album
Title	Year	AUT	CRO Billb.	Album
"Otrovan" (Henny featuring Voyage)	2019	—	—	Non-album single
"Balerina" (Tea Tairović featuring Voyage)	2023	—	2	Balerina
"Garava" (Devito featuring Voyage)	2023	72	3	Plava krv
"Jebiga" (Bausa featuring Nucci and Voyage)	2025	58	—	Der Faktor Mensch
"—" denotes a single that did not chart or was not released in that territory. "*" denotes a single that was released before the chart launch.

== Filmography ==
Filmography of Mihajlo Veruović – Voyage
Year	Title	Genre	Role	Notes
2022–present	U klinču	Television	Aljoša Kovač	Main character
2022	Komedija na tri sprata	Film	Ogi	

== Awards and nominations ==
List of awards and nominations of Voyage
Year	Award	Category	Nominee/work	Result	Ref.
2020	Music Awards Ceremony	YouTube Star	Himself and Breskvica	Won	
2023	Music Awards Ceremony	Male Trap Song of the Year	"Detinjstvo"	Nominated	
2023	Music Awards Ceremony	Drill Song of the Year	"Euforija"	Nominated	
2023	Music Awards Ceremony	New Age Collaboration of the Year	"Gad" (Nucci feat. Voyage)	Won	
2023	Music Awards Ceremony	Viral Song of the Year	"Tango"	Won	
