= Tea Tairović =

Serbian singer-songwriter (born 1996)

- Tea Таировић
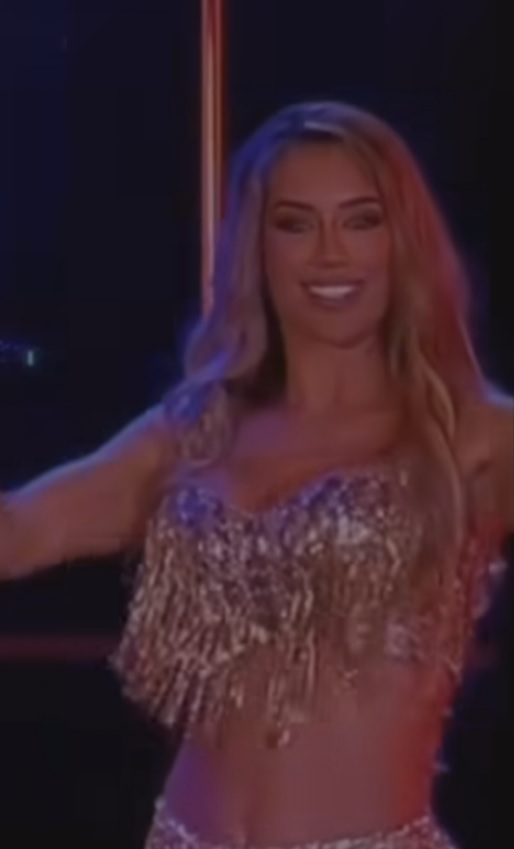
- Tairović in 2023
- Born: 26 April 1996 (age 30); Novi Sad, Serbia, FR Yugoslavia
- Other name: Tea Tairović-Vardaj
- Occupations: Singer; songwriter; dancer
- Years active: 2013–present
- Height: 1.76 m (5 ft 9 in)
- Spouse: Ivan Vardaj (m. 2025)
- Musical career
- Genres: Pop-folk; turbo-folk; Arabesk
- Instruments: Vocals
- Works: Tea Tairović discography
- Labels: Grand; IDJTunes; T Music
- Website: teatairovic.rs

Tea Tairović-Vardaj (Serbian Cyrillic: Tea Таировић-Вардај; born 26 April 1996) is a Serbian singer, songwriter, and dancer. She rose to prominence as a contestant on the reality television singing competition Zvezde Granda (2015–2016). Following the release of her single "Hajde" (2021), she broke into the mainstream. She has released six studio albums to date, as well as numerous standalone singles and collaborations with other performers in the region such as Sanja Vučić, Šaban Šaulić, and Azis.

Recognized for her performances, which include elements of belly dance and Latin dance, and for covering songs from Albania, Bulgaria, Greece, and Romania, Tairović has been described as "the Shakira of the Balkans."

== Early life ==
Tea Tairović was born 26 April 1996 in Novi Sad, Serbia, FR Yugoslavia to Božica Malević and Zoran Tairović. Her mother formerly worked as a television presenter and her father is an academic painter. Through her father, she is of Romani descent. Her paternal grandmother died from the consequences of the 1999 NATO bombing of FR Yugoslavia, which left her father's house destroyed.

Tairović has been dancing since the age of three, when she started ballet school, and won second place at the World Championship in Show Dance. She trained in standard and Latin American dances, ballet, and jazz ballet. She graduated from Svetozar Marković high school, later enrolling in the Faculty of Philosophy at the University of Novi Sad to study psychology. She has not completed her studies due to her music career.

== Career ==
=== 2013–2016: Zvezde Granda and career beginnings ===
Tairović released her first single "Da si moj" in 2014; however, the song did not meet greater audience reactions, until 2015, when she appeared on the singing competition show Zvezde Granda, after she had already participated in the competition once in 2013.

She sang songs by Severina, Ana Nikolić, Tijana Dapčević, Aleksandra Radović, Nina Badrić, and others. In the final, she sang the songs "Ti ne znaš kako je" by Nina Badrić and "Plamen od ljubavi" by Colonia. As a prize, the record label Grand Production gave her the song "Karakterna osobina," which was released in the summer of 2015. In late 2016, she released single "Meni odgovara" under the IDJTunes music label. Tairović then released the single "Igračica" in 2017.

=== 2017–2021: Breakthrough and further success ===
In April 2017, Tairović released the song "Nevolja," which was written and produced by the Bosnian hip-hop duo Buba Corelli and Jala Brat. In June of the same year, Tairović achieved great success with the song "Otkad tebe znam," a collaboration with Serbian turbo-folk singer Šaban Šaulić. The song was one of the biggest hits of 2017 in the Balkans, accruing over 80 million views on YouTube to date. In September of the same year, she released a collaboration "Idu dani" (Days Are Passing) with the Serbian rapper Rimski. In November of the same year, she released the song "Drama" with the Macedonian folk singer Menil Velioski, which showcased a change in Tairović's sound. Towards the end of the year, Tairović released her first ballad "I u dobru i u zlu."

In 2018, Tairović released a duet with Ivana Krunić called "Brat na brata." Several months later, she released a collaboration with DJ Shone called "Medikament." She released her first self-written single called "Polako" in January 2019, which also became a big hit in the Balkans. She premiered the single in the show Zvezde Granda Specijal. In March 2019, she released song "Mala" in collaboration with Serbian rapper Tozla. During the same year, she released four more songs, two of which were duets. On 18 July of the same year, Tairović released song "Dolce i Gabbana." A few days later, on 26 July, Tairović released song "Samo moj," a collaboration with the Austrian singer Monika. In October of the same year, Tairović released song "Bliznakinja." On 26 April 2020, she released the song "Svetica."

In May 2021, Tairović achieved great success with the song "Hajde", which became a major hit in the Balkans and is her biggest song to date. It is a cover of the traditional Kosovo Albanian wedding song "Hajde luj qyqek," specifically Yllka Kuqi and Yll Demaj's 2017 rendition. The lyrics were co-written by Tairović and Serbian singer-songwriter Sanja Vučić, and the music video has accumulated over 100 million views on YouTube. In September of the same year, she released the single "Na jednu noć," which also became a commercial success and has accumulated over 80 million views on YouTube. "Hajde" and "Na jednu noć" also entered Billboard's newly established Croatia Songs chart in February 2022.

=== 2022–2023: Balkanija and Balerina ===
On 21 May 2022, she independently released her studio album, Balkanija, under her own established music label T Music. Balkanija consists of nine songs, each of them accompanied by a music video. The title track's music video promotes Balkan unity and includes the flag of every Balkan nation. The album was a success in Serbia and the former Yugoslavia region. The tracks "Dva i dva" and "Dubai" respectively peaked at numbers 7 and 17 on the Billboard Croatia Songs chart. All nine music videos from the album have amassed nearly 280 million views on YouTube, as of February 2023.

Tairović released her second studio album, Balerina, on 16 May 2023. It included stand-out hits like the title track, featuring Serbian rapper Voyage, and "Izrael i Palestina." Balerina also entered the official album charts in Austria and Switzerland, peaking at numbers 17 and 79 respectively. On 17 June 2023, Tairović held her first major solo concert at the Tašmajdan Stadium in Belgrade which was attended by more than 12,000 people. The concert featured guest performances from Serbian singer Sanja Vučić and Bulgarian singer Galena, who collaborated with Tairović on the 2023 single "Abracadabra." In November 2023, Tairović announced that she would no longer sing "Izrael i Palestina" in light of the war in Gaza, changing the song's title to "Španija i Argentina".

=== 2024–2025: Tea, Aska, and Aska II ===
On 31 May 2024, her self-titled album Tea was released under her independent record label T Music. "TeaNucci," a collaboration with Serbian rapper Nucci peaked at number 4 on Billboard's Croatia Songs chart.

In 2024, Tairović wrote three songs for one of Serbia's most popular turbo-folk singers, Seka Aleksić: "Umri do zore," "Ti i ja," and "Eminentna dama."

On 5 May 2025, her fourth studio album, Aska, was released. It features the song "Çok güzel," which combines Serbian and Turkish lyrics. It peaked at number 3 on Billboard's Croatia Songs chart and at number 35 on the Ö3 Austria Top 40 chart. On 2 December 2025, Aska II was released.

=== 2026–present: Dominantna ===
In 2026, Tairović wrote the song "Ela Ela" for frequent collaborator Sanja Vučić.

On 3 April 2026, Tairović released a single in collaboration with Montenegrin singer Dado Polumenta titled "Šamar", which she wrote and composed, along with a music video.

On 12 May 2026, Tairović released her sixth studio album, Dominantna. The album features English lyrics in the song "Ritam Balkan", and Greek lyrics in the songs "Kuća kola stan" and "S'agapo". On 10 August, she released the single "Golube", a cover of Nataša Đorđević's 2001 song of the same name.

== Personal life ==
On 24 April 2025, Tairović married Ivan Vardaj in Novi Sad, Serbia.

== Discography ==
- Balkanija (2022)
- Balerina (2023)
- Tea (2024)
- Aska (2025)
- Aska II (2025)
- Dominantna (2026)

== Filmography ==
Television appearances
Year	Title	Role	Notes
2013–2014	Zvezde Granda	Herself	Season 8; contestant
2015–2016	Zvezde Granda	Herself	Season 10; contestant

== Awards and nominations ==
List of awards and nominations of Tea Tairović
Year	Award	Category	Nominee/work	Result	Ref.
2023	Music Awards Ceremony	Pop-Folk Song of the Year	"Dva i dva"	Nominated	

== Tours ==
=== Headlining ===
- Balkanija Tour (2022)
- Na Jednu Noć Tour (2023–2024)
- Neka Gori Balkan Tour (2024-2025)

=== Co-headlining ===
- USA Tour (2021)
