= Neka Gori Balkan Tour =

2024–25 concert tour by Tea Tairović

- Tour by Tea Tairović
- Promotional poster for concert in Belgrade at Belgrade Arena, September 2024
- Location: Europe; Asia
- Associated album: Tea
- Start date: 21 September 2024
- Legs: 1
- No. of shows: 30

Tea Tairović concert chronology
- Na Jednu Noć Tour (2023–24); Neka Gori Balkan Tour (2024–25)

Neka Gori Balkan Tour is the ongoing third headlining concert tour by Serbian singer Tea Tairović, in support of her third studio album, Tea (2024). It began on 21 September 2024, in Belgrade, Serbia, at Belgrade Arena. The tour was also announced to visit other major cities in other Southeast European countries.

== Background ==
In May 2024, Tairović released her third studio album, Tea, which in just a few days after its release, experienced great commercial success, and in just 3 days, was listened to over 15 million times on music platforms. On June 5, of the same year, she was a guest on the Ami G Show, while promoting the album, she announced the date for her big solo concert in the Belgrade Arena, which will also be the start of her big regional tour, called "Neka Gori Balkan". It will pass through all big cityes in Southeast European countries. The name of the tour references the lyrics from her 2021 hit single "Hajde".

== Set list ==
This setlist was obtained from the concert of September 21, 2024 held at Belgrade Arena in Belgrade. It does not represent all shows throughout the tour.

1. "Bakšiš+intro"
2. "Na jednu noć"
3. "Da si najbolji"
4. "Ne zaboravi me" (Jovana Tipšin cover)
5. "Pec"
6. "Bibi, habibi"
7. "Pijan"
8. "Polako"
9. "Dubai"
10. "Španija i Argentina"
11. "Nek ti je srećno"
12. "Marakesh-Dubai" (with Sanja Vučić)
13. "Makadam" (Sanja Vučić solo)
14. "Ološi" (Sanja Vučić solo)
15. "Pozovi"
16. "Plakala bih i bez suza" (Suzana Jovanović cover)
17. "Naivčina"
18. "Hajde"
19. "Žao mi je, žao" (Funky G cover)
20. "Budalo"
21. "Dva i dva"
22. "Ime mi je ljubav"
23. "Katastrofa" (with Azis)
24. "Sen Trope" (Azis solo)
25. "Daj, daj"
26. "Balerina"
27. "Veštica"
28. "Boy boy"
29. "Ljubavnica"
30. "TeaNucci" (with Nucci)
31. "Crno oko" (Nucci solo)
32. "Ruzmarin" (Sanja Vučić, Nucci solo)
33. "Ola"
34. "Zbogom ljubavi" (Acoustic)
35. "Crno odelo"
36. "Neka pati ona"
37. "Preživeću"
38. "Balkanija"
39. "Svetica"
40. "Otkad tebe znam"
41. "Tea"
42. "Malo mi je"
43. "More bez brodova"
44. "Kučke i demoni"
45. "Preterala"
46. "100%"
47. "Titanik"
48. "Udari"
49. "Ne brini majko"

== Tour dates ==
List of concerts, showing date, city, country and venue
Date	City	Country	Venue
September 21, 2024	Belgrade	Serbia	Belgrade Arena
September 22, 2024	Belgrade	Serbia	Belgrade Arena
September 28, 2024	Zurich	Switzerland	Club Face
October 5, 2024	Vicenza	Italy	K2 Elite
October 11, 2024	Niš	Serbia	Čair Hall
October 12, 2024	Linz	Austria	Club Imperial
October 18, 2024	Ljubljana	Slovenia	Media Center
October 19, 2024	Offenbach	Germany	Club Play
October 25, 2024	Gothenburg	Sweden	Frihamen Arena
October 26, 2024	Stockholm	Sweden	X Sara
October 31, 2024	Posušje	Bosnia and Herzegovina	Club Gaudeamos
November 2, 2024	Düsseldorf	Germany	Club Koe
November 6, 2024	Podgorica	Montenegro	Imanje Knjaz
November 7, 2024	Nikšić	Montenegro	ExClusive
November 9, 2024	Salzburg	Austria	Triebwerk West
November 23, 2024	Sofia	Bulgaria	Arena Armeec
November 30, 2024	Skopje	North Macedonia	Arena Boris Trajkovski
December 7, 2024	Koblach	Austria	Club Pin
December 12, 2024	Plovdiv	Bulgaria	Bushido
December 14, 2024	Augsburg	Germany	Sound Factory
December 20, 2024	Stara Zagora	Bulgaria	Cavalli
December 25, 2024	Cazin	Bosnia and Herzegovina	Advantage
December 28, 2024	Strumica	North Macedonia	Club Avatar
December 29, 2024	Velingrad	Bulgaria	Arte Hotel
December 30, 2024	Ohrid	North Macedonia	Hangar
December 31, 2024	Belgrade	Serbia	Hotel Metropol Place
January 3, 2025	Loznica	Serbia	Lagator
January 4, 2025	Banja Luka	Bosnia and Herzegovina	Event Centar Astorya
February 8, 2025	Berlin	Germany	Club Diamond
February 14, 2025	Dortmund	Germany	Beyaz Saray
February 15, 2025	Payerne	Switzerland	Halle des Fetes
February 19, 2025	Sofia	Bulgaria	Cest La Vie
February 22, 2025	Zurich	Switzerland	Club Sax
March 8, 2925	Kotor	Montenegro	Club Maximus
March 14, 2025	Varna	Bulgaria	Brick Port
March 15, 2025	Pazardzhik	Bulgaria	Tiger House
March 21, 2025	Plovdiv	Bulgaria	Bushido
March 29, 2025	Vienna	Austria	Tresor
April 4, 2025	Oslo	Norway	Eventhallen
April 5, 2025	Erbendorf	Germany	Teatro
April 11, 2025	Dubai	United Arab Emirates	Iris Dubai
April 26, 2025	Salzburg	Austria	ExIt
May 1, 2025	Budva	Montenegro	Club Omnia
May 2, 2025	Paralia	Greece	Flex Hall
May 3, 2025	Stuttgart	Germany	Metropola
May 10, 2025	Zagreb	Croatia	Arena Zagreb
May 17, 2025	Linz	Austria	Metropola
May 24, 2025	Amsterdam	Netherlands	Club H7
May 30, 2025	Hanover	Germany	RP5 Club
May 31, 2025	Hamburg	Germany	Guenspan Club
June 6, 2025	Niš	Serbia	Niš Fortress
June 7, 2025	Probištip	North Macedonia	Aqua Park
June 14, 2025	Kumanovo	North Macedonia	Hotel Spa
June 28, 2025	Ulm	Germany	Club Klang Deck
July 7, 2025	Bitola	North Macedonia	Rukometno igralište
