= Nataša Đorđević =

Serbian singer (born 1974)

Nataša Đorđević Наташа Ђорђевић
- Born: 13 May 1974 (age 52); Belgrade, SR Serbia, Yugoslavia
- Genres: Pop-folk
- Occupation: Singer
- Instrument: Vocals
- Years active: 1989-present
- Labels: PGP RTS, Lucky Sound, Vujin Trade Line AG Grand Production, Gold Music

Nataša Đorđević (Serbian Cyrillic: Наташа Ђорђевић; born 13 May 1974) is a Serbian pop-folk singer. Her first album was released by Jugodisk in 1990. Today, she is one of the most successful artists from the label Grand Production. She has released many collaborations with famous Serbian singers. Together with Suzana Jovanović, she has provided backing vocals for Stoja, another popular Serbian pop-folk singer. Đorđević has also provided backing vocals for Ćana.

== Discography ==
- Ti si otrov moj (1990)
- Hej djavole (1991)
- Kad tad (1992)
- Avanturista (1994)
- Prevara (1995)
- Kletva (1997)
- Da umrem od tuge (1999)
- Alal vera (2000)
- Zaboravi broj (2001)
- Baš, baš (2002)
- Ne daj me srećo (2003)
- Neoprostivo (2006)
- Nataša Đorđević (2012)

== Dubbing ==
- Gokujō!! Mecha Mote Iinchō (2012-2013)
