= Na Jednu Noć Tour =

2023–24 concert tour by Tea Tairović

- Tour by Tea Tairović
- Promotional poster for the concert in Skopje at Arena Jane Sandanski, December 2023
- Associated album: Balkanija; Balerina
- Start date: 17 June 2023
- End date: 29 June 2024
- Legs: 5
- No. of shows: 10 in North America; 3 in Australia; 78 in Europe; 91 in total

Tea Tairović concert chronology
- Balkanija Tour (2022); Na Jednu Noć Tour (2023–24); Neka Gori Balkan Tour (2024–25)

Na Jednu Noć Tour (Also known as Balerina Tour) was the second concert tour and debut arena tour by Serbian singer-songwriter Tea Tairović, launched in support of her debut and second studio albums, Balkanija (2022) and Balerina (2023). The tour began on June 17, 2023, in Belgrade at the Tašmajdan Stadium, and concluded on June 29, 2024, in Sarajevo, at Club Aqua. The tour also visited other major cities in other Balkan countries, such as Zagreb, Sarajevo and Skopje.

== Background ==
Shortly after the release of her debut album Balkanija, on 2 May 2022, Tairović announced that she already started working on her second album. In February 2023, the date for her first big major solo concert, at the Tašmajdan Stadium, titled "Vodi me na Taš", which marked the official start of the new tour, was annauced. In May of the same year, Tairović revealed cover, track list, release date and how second album, will be called Balerina. Tairović went on a mini-tour of the same name trought clubs all over Europe and North America, and then started with big and debut arena concerts titled "Na Jednu Noć", in support of both of her albums. In October 2023, she announced the full list of concerts that are part of the Na Jednu Noć Tour. Australian leg of the tour was announced in July of the same year.

== Tour dates ==
List of concerts, showing date, city, country and venue
| Date | City | Country | Venue |
Europe
| June 17, 2023 | Belgrade | Serbia | Tašmajdan Stadium |
North America
| September 15, 2023 | Atlanta | United States | Ehall Atlant |
| September 16, 2023 | Chicago | United States | Stereo Nightclub |
| September 17, 2023 | Jacksonville | United States | Jax Events & Lounge |
| September 20, 2023 | Miami | United States | Gala Club |
| September 22, 2023 | Detroit | United States | Imperial House |
| September 23, 2023 | St. Louis | United States | Falls Convention Center |
| September 24, 2023 | Utica | United States | Valentino’s Banquet Hall |
| September 27, 2023 | Las Vegas | United States | Cafe Derbi |
| September 29, 2023 | St. Petersburg | United States | MK Event Hall |
| September 30, 2023 | New Jersey | United States | The Meadowbrook |
Europe
| October 11, 2023 | Sofia | Bulgaria | Club Illusion |
| October 13, 2023 | Bjelovar | Croatia | VIP Club |
| October 14, 2023 | Vicenza | Italy | K2 |
| October 20, 2023 | Nuremberg | Germany | Club Maskara |
| October 21, 2023 | Zürich | Switzerland | Club Face |
| October 27, 2023 | Bijeljina | Bosnia and Herzegovina | Globus |
Australia
| November 3, 2023 | Perth | Australia | Villa Nightclub |
| November 5, 2023 | Sydney | Australia | Liberty Hall |
| November 6, 2023 | Melbourne | Australia | QRoom |
Europe
| November 10, 2023 | Innsbruck | Austria | Queens |
| November 11, 2023 | Villach | Austria | Vanilla |
| November 15, 2023 | Plovdiv | Bulgaria | Bushido |
| November 16, 2023 | Sofia | Bulgaria | Cest La Vie |
| November 17, 2023 | Varna | Bulgaria | Isteria |
| November 18, 2023 | Leskovac | Serbia | La Casa |
| November 24, 2023 | Stapar | Serbia | Club Time |
| November 25, 2023 | Stuttgart | Germany | Metropola |
| December 1, 2023 | Offenbach | Germany | Club Play |
| December 2, 2023 | Wiener Neustadt | Austria | Arena Nova |
| December 6, 2023 | Sofia | Bulgaria | Club Illusion |
| December 9, 2023 | Sarajevo | Bosnia and Herzegovina | Arena Skenderija |
| December 13, 2023 | Podgorica | Montenegro | Imanje Knjaz |
| December 16, 2023 | Skopje | North Macedonia | Arena Jane Sandanski |
| December 22, 2023 | Vienna | Austria | Tresor |
| December 23, 2023 | Helsingborg | Sweden | The Meadowbrook |
| December 24, 2023 | Norrköping | Sweden | Folkborgsvägen |
| December 25, 2023 | Düsseldorf | Germany | Club Koe |
| December 27, 2023 | Derventa | Bosnia and Herzegovina | Dvorana Dreventa |
| December 31, 2023 | Zagreb | Croatia | Zagreb Fair |
| January 1, 2024 | Belgrade | Serbia | Crown Plaza |
| January 2, 2024 | Kotor | Montenegro | Club Maximus |
| January 3, 2024 | Loznica | Serbia | Lagator |
| January 13, 2024 | Belgrade | Serbia | Trg Repbulike |
| January 18, 2024 | Skopje | North Macedonia | Aleksandar Palace |
| January 19, 2024 | Split | Croatia | Club Vibe |
| January 20, 2024 | Linz | Austria | Imperial Club |
| January 26, 2024 | Kragujevac | Serbia | Jezero Hall |
| January 27, 2024 | Ruse | Bulgaria | Club Bank |
| February 3, 2024 | Rotterdam | Netherlands | Ex You Party Nl |
| February 7, 2024 | Sofia | Bulgaria | Club Ilusion |
| February 9, 2024 | Hanover | Germany | Ludnica events |
| February 10, 2024 | Hamburg | Germany | Club Hb |
| February 13, 2024 | Nikšić | Montenegro | ExClusive |
| February 14, 2024 | Podgorica | Montenegro | Private |
| February 15, 2024 | Kopaonik | Serbia | Hotel Grand |
| February 17, 2024 | Ulm | Germany | Klang Deck |
| February 24, 2024 | Brussels | Belgium | Claridge Hall |
| March 2, 2024 | Vienna | Austria | Hallman Dome |
| March 13, 2024 | Sofia | Bulgaria | Cest La Vie |
| March 15, 2024 | Sinj | Croatia | Piccadilly |
| March 23, 2024 | London | United Kingdom | Hotel Novotel |
| March 30, 2024 | Teslić | Bosnia and Herzegovina | SD Radolinka |
| March 31, 2024 | Orašje | Bosnia and Herzegovina | Club S |
| April 5, 2024 | Kumanovo | North Macedonia | Hotel Spa |
| April 6, 2024 | Paris | France | Club Haussman |
| April 10, 2024 | Tuzla | Bosnia and Herzegovina | Mejdan Hall |
| April 12, 2024 | Ljubljana | Slovenia | Pure Hall |
| April 13, 2024 | Salzburg | Austria | Arena Salzburg |
| April 19, 2024 | Antwerp | Belgium | Icon Club |
| April 20, 2024 | Berlin | Germany | Club Diamond |
| April 26, 2024 | Kočani | North Macedonia | Ale-dar premium hotel |
| April 27, 2024 | Zurich | Switzerland | Face Club |
| May 1, 2024 | Budva | Montenegro | Omnia |
| May 4, 2024 | Pforzheim | Germany | Flash |
| May 10, 2024 | Bielefeld | Germany | Loodnica Hall |
| May 11, 2024 | Graz | Austria | Vortex Hall |
| May 12, 2024 | Budva | Montenegro | Medicinijada |
| May 16, 2024 | Varna | Bulgaria | Club Cult |
| May 17, 2024 | Shumen | Bulgaria | Mega Club |
| May 18, 2024 | Sofia | Bulgaria | Private Hall |
| May 24, 2024 | Vukovar | Croatia | Club Padre |
| May 25, 2024 | Dusseldorf | Germany | Club Koe |
| May 31, 2024 | Skopje | North Macedonia | Event Centar |
| June 1, 2024 | St. Gallen | Switzerland | Seepaksaal |
| June 7, 2024 | Sofia | Bulgaria | The 1 Exclusive |
| June 8, 2024 | Leskovac | Serbia | La Casa |
| June 14, 2024 | Podgorica | Mntenegro | Djedovina |
| June 15, 2024 | Štip | North Macedonia | Clique |
| June 28, 2024 | Mostar | Bosnia and Herzegovina | Daleka Obala |
| June 29, 2024 | Sarajevo | Bosnia and Herzegovina | Club Aqua |
