= Nucci (rapper) =

Serbian rapper and singer (born 1996)

Nucci Нући
- Born: Igor Panić; 10 August 1996 (age 30); Smederevo, Serbia, FR Yugoslavia
- Genres: Trap; pop
- Occupations: Rapper; singer; songwriter
- Instrument: Vocals
- Years active: 2019-present
- Label: Generacija Zed

Igor Panić (Serbian Cyrillic: Игор Панић; born 10 August 1996), better known as Nucci (Serbian: Нући, romanized: Nući), is a Serbian rapper. He rose to prominence in 2020 with the single "BeBo" and has since had numerous commercially successful singles, including six Croatia Songs-topping songs. His debut album Zamena za bol was released in 2024.

== Early life ==
Igor Panić was born on 10 August 1996 in Smederevo, FR Yugoslavia. He began writing songs during elementary school. His main childhood music influences were Serbian hip-hop artists Marčelo, Bad Copy, and Wikluh Sky. Panić stated that he was also influenced Amy Winehouse, AC/DC, Iggy Pop, 50 Cent, Rihanna, Cypress Hill, and Zvonko Bogdan through his father who took him to their live shows. The stage name 'Nucci' comes from a high school nickname.

== Career ==
Nucci made his recording debut in 2011. He gained more significant popularity upon the release of the single "Bebo" in June 2020 through Generacija Zed. Following a series of successful singles in 2020 and 2021, Nucci began performing for Serbian diaspora across Europe and also embarked on a short tour in the United States in November 2021 along with rappers Voyage, Corona, and Rimski.

In August 2022, together with Voyage, Nucci headlined his first Music Week Festival in Ušće, Belgrade. He made a cameo appearance in U klinču on Radio Television of Serbia later that October. He and Voyage performed at the 2023 New Year's Eve concert in front of the House of the National Assembly in Belgrade. On 6 October 2023, the duo held their first major concert at the Port of Belgrade, entitled Beograd daje sve (lit. 'Belgrade Gives Everything'). Recognised for his fashion style, Nucci became the first man to be featured on the cover of the Serbian Harper's Bazaar in December 2023.

On 24 October 2024, Nucci released his debut album Zamena za bol through Generacija Zed. It peaked at number eight in Austria and number twenty in Switzerland. In addition, seven tracks form the album charted in Croatia. The following June, he released EP Trilogy, which spawned a chart-topping song "Hilton Hotel Barça".

== Discography ==
=== Albums ===
==== Studio albums ====
List of studio albums, showing release date, label, chart positions and certifications
Title	Details	Peak chart positions	
Title	Details	AUT	SUI
Zamena za bol	Released: 24 October 2024; Label: Generacija Zed; Format: Digital download, streaming	8	20
Dve barbike	Released: 19 May 2026; Label: Generacija Zed; Format: Digital download, streaming	15	50

==== Live albums ====
List of live albums, showing release date, label, chart positions and certifications
Title	Details
Nucci: Music Week (Live)	Released: 1 October 2021; Label: Sky Music; Format: Digital download, streaming
Nucci & Voyage: Music Week (Live 2022) (with Voyage)	Released: 23 September 2022; Label: Sky Music; Format: Digital download, streaming
Belgrade Music Week 2023 (Live) (with Voyage)	Released: 21 July 2023; Label: Sky Music; Format: Digital download, streaming

=== Extended plays ===
List of extended plays (EPs), showing release date, label, chart positions and certifications
Title	Details
Trilogy	Released: 6 June 2025; Label: Generacija Zed; Format: Digital download, streaming

=== Singles ===
==== As lead artist ====
List of singles as lead artist, with selected chart positions and showing year released
Title	Year	Peak chart positions			Album
Title	Year	AUT	AUT Billb.	CRO Billb.	Album
"Hotline"	2019	—	—	—	Non-album singles
"Warm Up"	2020	—	—	—	Non-album singles
"Bebo"	2020	—	—	—	Non-album singles
"Uđi na WA"	2020	—	—	—	Non-album singles
"Bambi"	2020	—	—	—	Non-album singles
"Hawanae"	2020	—	—	—	Non-album singles
"Vroom"	2021	—	—	—	Non-album singles
"Bibi"	2021	—	—	—	Non-album singles
"Bebo 2"	2021	—	—	—	Non-album singles
"Balkan" (with Voyage)	2021	—	—	—	Non-album singles
"Yugozapad"	2021	—	—	—	Non-album singles
"Localo"	2021	—	—	—	Non-album singles
"Crno oko"	2022	24	7	1	Non-album singles
"Gad" (with Voyage)	2022	21	8	1	Europol
"Bebo 3"	2022	—	—	2	Non-album singles
"Skankovi hibridi" (Bibi remix) (with Seksi and Biba)	2022	—	—	—	Non-album singles
"Zovite doktore" (with Relja)	2022	—	—	8	Non-album singles
"Opanci"	2022	—	—	—	Non-album singles
"Đerdan" (with Sanja Vučić)	2022	—	—	1	Non-album singles
"Bella Hadid" (with Voyage)	2023	49	—	2	Europol
"Automatti"	2023	—	—	1	Non-album singles
"Rajske kiše"	2023	45	—	3	Non-album singles
"Frauen" (with Zera)	2023	—	—	8	Non-album singles
"Chigirigi"	2023	—	—	24	Non-album singles
"Periferija" (with Voyage)	2023	—	—	—	Non-album singles
"BeBo 4"	2024	—	—	4	Non-album singles
"Hi hi – ha ha" (with Biba and Devito)	2024	—	—	1	Zamena za bol
"Zamena za bol"	2024	—	—	—	Zamena za bol

==== Promotional singles ====
List of promotional singles, with selected chart positions and showing year released
Title	Year	Peak chart positions	Album
Title	Year	CRO Billb.	Album
"Daytona" (Devito featuring Nucci)	2023	—	Plava krv
"Metak" (with Severina)	2023	20	Sorry
"OMB" (with Relja)	2024	6	Stroberi
"Duni, duni"	2024	—	Generacija Zed 2024

=== Other charted songs ===
List of other charted songs, with selected chart positions and showing year released
Title	Year	Peak chart positions		Album
Title	Year	AUT	CRO Billb.	Album
"Ruzmarin" (with Sanja Vučić)	2023	—	3	Remek-delo
"TeaNucci" (with Tea Tairović)	2024	—	4	Tea
"Vagabundo" (featuring Sanja Vučić)	2024	—	3	Zamena za bol
"Audi TT"	2024	—	9	Zamena za bol
"Marija"	2024	—	7	Zamena za bol
"Ceo svet" (featuring Rasta)	2024	—	5	Zamena za bol
"Preko linije" (featuring Relja)	2024	—	19	Zamena za bol
"Oči plave"	2024	—	23	Zamena za bol
"Voice"	2024	—	2	Zamena za bol
"Hilton Hotel Barça"	2025	62	1	Trilogy
"BMWiliSClass"	2025	—	22	Trilogy
"Jebiga" (with Bausa and Voyage)	2025	58	—	Der Faktor Mensch
"Contrasmerom"	2026	—	19	Dve barbike
"Dve barbike"	2026	—	11	Dve barbike
"Amiri"	2026	—	16	Dve barbike
"Loro piana"	2026	—	14	Dve barbike
"Leverkusen"	2026	—	25	Dve barbike

== Awards and nominations ==
List of awards and nominations of Nucci
Year	Award	Category	Nominee/work	Result	Ref.
2023	Music Awards Ceremony	Balkan Trap Song of the Year	"Crno oko"	Nominated	
2023	Music Awards Ceremony	Music Video of the Year	"Crno oko"	Nominated	
2023	Music Awards Ceremony	New Age Collaboration of the Year	"Gad" (Nucci feat. Voyage)	Won	
2023	Music Awards Ceremony	Viral Song of the Year	"Gad" (Nucci feat. Voyage)	Nominated	
2023	Belgrade Music Week	Hit Song of 2023	"Automatti"	Won	
