= Ćana =

Bosnian singer (born 1968)

- Born: Stanojka Bodiroža; March 22, 1968 (age 58); Gornja Tramošnica, SR Bosnia and Herzegovina, SFR Yugoslavia
- Occupation: Singer
- Years active: 1987–present

Stanojka Mitrović (née Bodiroža; born 22 March 1968), known professionally as Ćana, is a Bosnian Serb folk singer.

== Biography ==
=== Early life ===
Ćana was born 22 March 1968 in the village of Gornja Tramošnja, SR Bosnia and Herzegovina, SFR Yugoslavia. She attended elementary school in the town of Tomina and completed her secondary education at an agricultural high school in Sanski Most. As a child, she sang in talent shows and at special events.

=== Career ===
Ćana's singing career began at the age of 19 when she was working at a kafana in Subotica, Serbia. Some musicians practicing there said to her, "You're Bosnian, you must know how to sing." Ćana performed songs by Vesna Zmijanac and Šemsa Suljaković. Rumors began circulating that there was a bartender who could sing. A band from Novi Sad came in one day in need of a singer and they soon began touring around Vojvodina and Montenegro. During the Yugoslav Wars, Ćana worked in Austria, Germany, Switzerland, and Canada.

In 1998, Ćana released her first album, Nadam ti se; the title track became one of her biggest hits.

=== Personal life ===
On 20 October 2001, Ćana married Dragan "Relja" Mitrović. In 2003, on the day of their wedding anniversary, she gave birth to their son Luka.

== Discography ==
- Nadam ti se (1998)
- Pomozi me (2000)
- Imam dokaz (2002)
- Nedostižna meta (2004)
- Dođi, sine (2007)
- Mostovi (2010)
- Biće svega (2013)
- Kad zatreperi duša (2015)
- Kako to (2017)
