= Jovana Pajić =

Serbian singer (born 1989)

Jovana Pajić Јована Пајић
- Born: 13 January 1989 (age 37); Belgrade, Yugoslavia
- Genres: Turbo-folk
- Occupation: Singer
- Years active: 2005–present

Jovana Pajić (Serbian: Јована Пајић, born 13 January 1989) is a Serbian singer.

== Biography ==
Pajić was born in Belgrade. She graduated from the Technical School and studied psychology at the Faculty of Media and Communications at Singidunum University. In 2005, Pajić applied for Zvezde Granda auditions, finishing fifth place in the final. With Bojan Tomović, she recorded the song "Jugić" in 2008. In 2010, Pajić took part in the reality show Farma, where she also finished fifth place. Since November 2018, Pajić has been a member of the Serbian girl group called the Ministarke as its eighth member.

Pajić was in a relationship twice with Aleksandar Cvetković from Tropico Band and pilot Mile Matović. She became engaged to latter in early 2012. The couple got married on 27 November 2012 and divorced in December 2021. They have two children together.

== Discography ==
Singles
Title	Year	Notes	Ref.
"Jugić"	2008	with Bojan Tomović	
"Tako htela sam"	2009		
"Lutke"	2010	with Mirko Gavrić	
"Ako ti je stalo"	2010	with Mirko Gavrić	
"BMW"	2011		
"Ludilo moje"	2024		
"Prezime se briše"	2024		
"Demoni"	2025	with Marija Šerifović	
