= Metar iznad asfalta =

Studio album by Ana Stanić
- Released: 1998
- Recorded: 1997–1998
- Genre: Pop
- Length: 47:41
- Label: PGP-RTS
- Producer: Ana Stanić; Ivan Kljajić; Nenad Stefanović; Voja Aralica

Ana Stanić chronology
Metar iznad asfalta (1998)	Vidim te kad (1999)

Singles from Metar iznad asfalta
- 1. "Molila sam anđele" Released: 1997; 2. "Točkovi" Released: 1998; 3. "Grad" Released: 1998; 4. "Sama" Released: 1998

Metar iznad asfalta (English: One Meter Above the Asphalt) is a 1998 debut album by Serbian pop singer Ana Stanić. She debuted as a solo artist with a song "Molila sam anđele" on Mediterranean Festival which was held in Budva. It was later released as her debut and first single off then-upcoming album, and it became very successful in the country, becoming her most notable and signature song to date. The album was released in summer 1998.

The album contains 11 songs, and 2 bonus tracks. The videos were shot for all four singles released off the album.

== Track list ==
1. "Grad" — 3:41
2. "Sunčan dan" — 3:43
3. "Duh" — 3:53
4. "Život je lep " — 4:04
5. "Javi se" — 3:41
6. "Točkovi" — 3:11
7. "Sama" — 3:42
8. "Ni veru ni ljubav" — 3:35
9. "Prizori boje prošlosti" — 4:23
10. "Zadnji sjaj" — 3:14
11. "Molila sam anđele (Unplugged)" — 2:37
1. "Grad (Goran Geto Mix)" — 3:44 (Bonus Track)
2. "Molila sam anđele" — 3:58 (Bonus Track)

== Notes ==
- The Ana Stanić's song "Sama" contains melodic samples of the Neno Belan's song "Vino noći" (for verse melody), of the Zdravko Čolić's song "Ti si mi u krvi" (for chorus melody), and of the Pearl Jam's song "Alive" (for post-chorus melody).
