= Darko Lazić (singer) =

Serbian turbo-folk singer (born 1991)

- Born: Darko Lazić; 12 October 1991 (age 34); Brestač, SR Serbia, SFR Yugoslavia
- Genres: Pop-folk
- Occupation: Singer
- Instrument: Vocals
- Years active: 2009–present
- Label: Grand Production

Darko Lazić (Serbian: Дарко Лазић, born 12 October 1991) is a Serbian singer. Born in the south Vojvodina village of Brestač, he rose to prominence as the winner of the fourth season of the televised singing contest Zvezde Granda in 2009. He is known for his hit songs like "Idi drugome", "Godinu dana 300 kafana", "Korak do sna", "Majko", and "Pismo".

== Personal life ==
Between 2014 and 2019, Lazić was married to singer and fellow Zvezde Granda contestant, Ana Sević, with whom he has a daughter. His former fiancée, Marina Gagić, also gave birth to his son. On 24 October 2024, he welcomed another child with his third wife, Katarina.

In 2018, Lazić admitted to having had drug addiction problems, after a video of him consuming cocaine had surfaced to the public.

=== Traffic accidents ===
In October 2018, Darko Lazić had a traffic accident near his home village of Brestač. According to the media reports, he was driving under influence at a speed of 100 km/h and did not have his seatbelt on. The accident caused him serious injuries and left him in a coma for 23 days. Despite committing several traffic offences, Lazić did not face any legal consequences.

On his wedding day in August 2023, Lazić was fined and sentenced to 10 months driving ban after a collision with a van on highway in Belgrade.

In September 2025, Lazić was involved in an accident with a city bus in New Belgrade, in which him and his wife suffered minor injuries. Reportedly, Lazić was driving under influence, which he denied, and was using a Czech driver's license, due to not having a valid Serbian licences. This marked his fourth traffic accident in seven years.

In March 2026, Lazić's brother died in a motorcycle accident.

== Discography ==
Albums

- Brate moj (2009)
- Godinu dana 300 kafana (2011)
