= Ana Stanić =

Serbian singer-songwriter (born 1975)

Ana Stanić Ана Станић
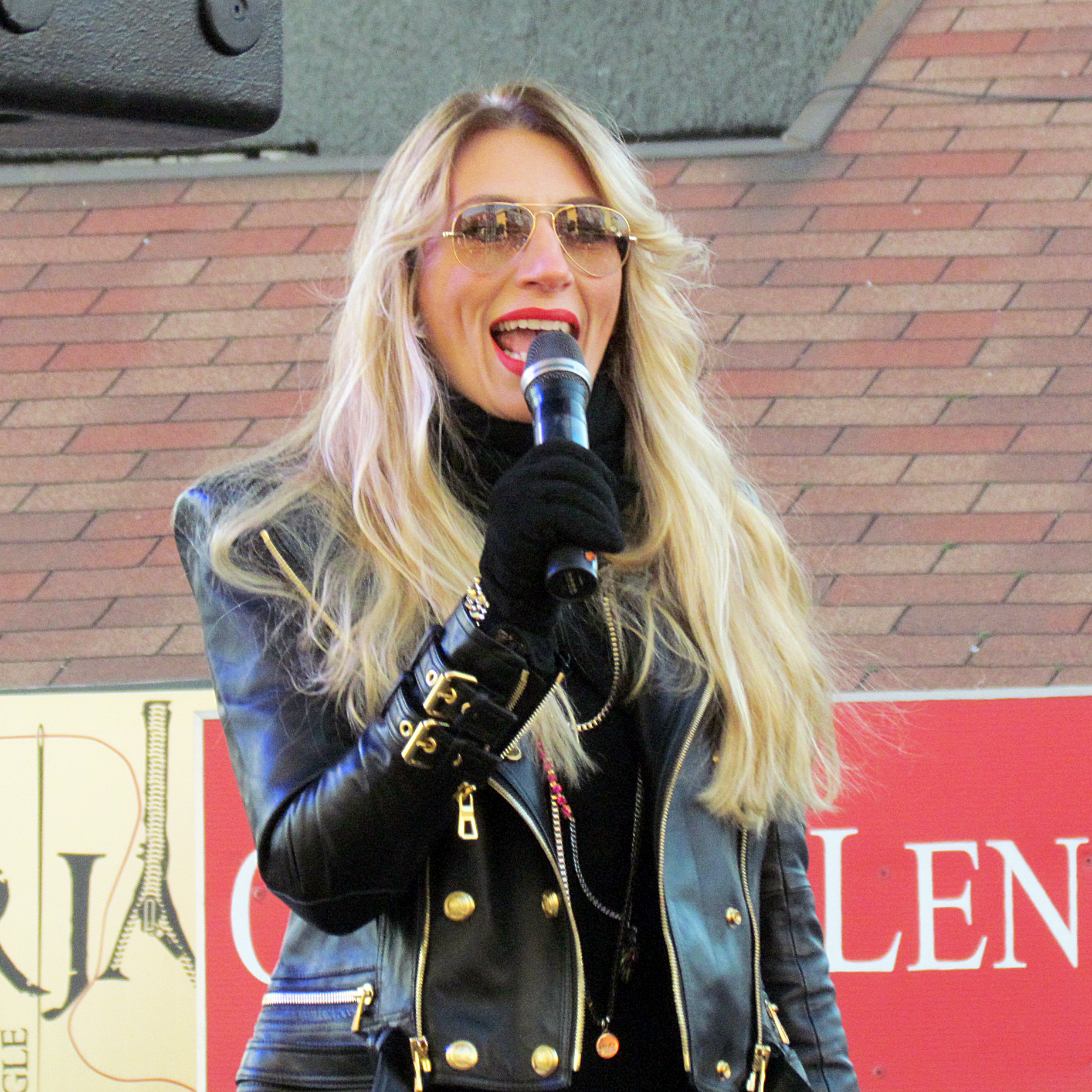
- Stanić in 2016

Background information
- Born: 8 December 1975 (age 50); Niš, SR Serbia, SFR Yugoslavia
- Origin: Belgrade, Serbia
- Genres: Eurodance; pop; power pop; pop rock; R&B
- Occupations: Singer, songwriter, composer, film producer
- Years active: 1994–present
- Labels: ZaM; PGP-RTS; Automatic Records; City Records; Mascom
- Formerly of: Moby Dick

Ana Stanić (Serbian Cyrillic: Ана Станић; born 8 December 1975) is a Serbian singer, songwriter, composer, and film producer.

Stanić started her musical career in early 1990s as a member of the Eurodance/pop duo Moby Dick, recording three studio albums as a member of the duo and authoring a number of their hits. She left Moby Dick in 1998, releasing her solo power pop-oriented debut Metar iznad asfalta to commercial and critical success. She has released six more studio albums since, moving towards pop and R&B sound.

A graduate from the Belgrade Faculty of Dramatic Arts film and TV production department, Stanić has ventured into film production as the producer of Srđan Golubović's film Absolute 100.

== Biography ==
=== Early life ===
Stanić was born in Niš in 1975. As a child, she attended specialist music school and graduated in violin, also singing in Krsmanović Choir. She wrote her first song at the age of twelve.

=== Musical career ===
==== Moby Dick (1994–1998) ====
In 1994, Stanić became the singer in the Eurodance/pop duo Moby Dick. She recorded three albums with Moby Dick, Kreni (Go, 1995), Moby Dick (1995) and Nostalgija (Nostalgia, 1997), which sold over 300,000 copies in FR Yugoslavia. During this period, Stanić wrote a number of the duo's songs, also writing songs for other Serbian pop acts–like Gala, Gloria, Zorana Pavić, and D'n'D–and appearing as vocalist on recordings by other Serbian Eurodance groups.

==== Solo career (1998–present) ====
In 1998, Stanić left Moby Dick to start a solo career. She had her first solo appearance on Budva Festival, performing the song "Molila sam anđele" ("I Prayed to the Angles"), which she co-wrote with Ivana Pavlović. Stanić released her solo power pop-oriented debut Metar iznad asfalta (One Meter Above the Asphalt) in 1998. The album songs were authored by Stanić, Mirko Vukomanović (who also produced the album), Snežana Vukomanović, Ivana Pavlović, Dražen Janković (of the Zabranjeno Pušenje Belgrade-based faction), Vlado Georgiev, and other songwriters. The album recording featured prominent studio musician Nenad Stefanović "Japanac" (bass guitar), former Bezobrazno Zeleno member Ivan Kljajić (guitar) and Galija member Dragutin Jakovljević (guitar). Metar iznad asfalta brought Stanić's major hit "Točkovi" ("Wheels"). It also included an unplugged version of "Molila sam anđele", as well as the "Ghetto Mix" of "Točkovi". On the album promotional tour, Stanić was backed by the band Točkovi, featuring Dragutin Jakovljević, Ivan Kljajić, Steva Ninčević (bass guitar) and Goran Milošević (formerly of Plejboj, drums).

Stanić in 2003

Stanić's second studio album, the 1999 Vidim te kad (I See You When), was also produced by Mirko Vukomanović, who also wrote the music arrangements. The album featured guest appearances by a number of notable Serbian guitarists: Zvonimir Đukić (of Van Gogh), Igor Perović (of Plejboj), Aleksandar Medan (of Love Hunters), Željko Markuš (of Kristali), Zvonko Stojkov (of Eva Braun), and Stanimir Lukić (formerly of Sunshine). Stanić's following studio album, Tri (Three), released in 2002, was her first release to feature all songs composed by herself. Stanić wrote part of the album lyrics, while the rest of the lyrics were authored by Marina Tucaković, Momčilo Bajagić "Bajaga" and Gordan Kopil. Tri was produced by Vojislav Aralica, who also played guitar on the album recording. The album featured guest appearances by keyboardists Milan Đurđević (of Neverne Bebe) and Vlada Maričić, and the song "Pogrešan" was produced and arranged by Vlado Georgiev.

Stanić's fourth album, U ogledalu (In the Mirror), was released in 2004. Her fifth studio release, the 2008 album Sudar (Crash), featured songs authored by Stanić and Đorđe Miljenović, while the song "Bioskop" ("Cinema") featured lyrics written by renowned singer-songwriter Arsen Dedić. The album Priča za pamćenje (A Story to Remember), released in 2015, featured songs authored by Stanić, Đorđe Miljenović, Mirko Vukomanović, and other songwriters. In 2019, Stanić released two maxi singles, Izgubljeno proleće (Lost Spring) and Moja Nova godina (My New Year's Eve), both in digital format only.

In 2024, Stanić released her latest studio release Kvar na srcu (Heart Malfunction) in digital format.

=== Other activities ===
Stanić attended Belgrade Faculty of Dramatic Arts, graduating from the Faculty's film and TV production department. She produced the 2001 Serbian film Absolute 100, directed by Srdan Golubović. She produced all of her music videos.

Stanić wrote music for a number of television commercials. She composed music for the 1999 children's theatre play Ivanine igračke (Ivana's Toys), performed across Kosovo by a travelling theatre company until the beginning of the 1999 NATO bombing of Yugoslavia. She appeared as guest vocalist on the 2019 album Hiljadu osmeha (A Thousand Smiles) by Miško Plavi Trio.

Stanić had cameo appearances in the films Slatko od snova (Jam Made of Dreams, 1994) and Seven and a Half (2006).

Stanić has been the ambassador for Dance4Life, an international organisation that rises awareness in AIDS prevention. She is current ambassador for MODS, child organisation in Serbia. During the COVID-19 pandemic, she started the MIMA group as a part of Serbian Chamber of Commerce, with the goal of improving the status of Serbian musicians.

== Solo discography ==
- Metar iznad asfalta (1998)
- Vidim te kad (1999)
- Tri (2002)
- U ogledalu (2004)
- Sudar (2008)
- Priča za pamćenje (2015)
- Kvar na srcu (2024)
