= Moby Dick (band) =

Serbian pop-dance band

- Origin: Belgrade (then Yugoslavia)
- Genres: Pop-Dance
- Years active: 1992–2001, 2010–
- Labels: City Records, BK Sound
- Members: Srđan Čolić, Aleksandra Perović
- Past members: Ana Stanić, Aleksandar Perišić, Goran Kandić, Ivan Milošević Ivanhoe

Moby Dick is a notable Serbian pop-dance band. It is named for the well-known novel Moby-Dick by Herman Melville.

Moby Dick was formed in 1992, initially as a six-member band. They released their first album Kreni in 1993. In 1994, Ana Stanić joined the band as female vocal. The band was transformed to a duet as the other members from the initial lineup left. The second album, Moby Dick was released that year and was a great success, selling more than 200.000 copies. It included hits like Nema nas vise, Brate prijatelju, Zar nije te stid, Bacila si čini and controversial Kralj Kokaina which was banned from some TV and radio stations. The band toured extensively during this period, which culminated with a sell-out concert in Sava Center in Belgrade.

In 1997 they release their third album, Nostalgija, which included hits like Nostalgija, Ubio sam čoveka zbog tebe and Padrino. In 1998 Ana Stanić left and was replaced with Aleksandra Perović. They released two albums, IV in 2000. and Hotelska soba in 2001. After their last album, Srđan decided to pursue his career as a studio manager and a producer, while Aleksandra started her solo career. She has recently released her first solo album. It is still unclear whether she will record on future Moby Dick albums.

== Discography ==
Albums:

- Kreni! (1994)
- Moby Dick (1995)
- Nostalgija (1997)
- IV (1998)
- Hotelska soba (2001)
