= Tomina, Sanski Most =

Tomina
- Village
- Location within Bosnia and Herzegovina
- Coordinates: 44.709590°N 16.724476°E
- Country: Bosnia and Herzegovina
- Entity: Federation of Bosnia and Herzegovina
- Canton: Una-Sana
- Municipality: Sanski Most

Area
  - Total: 4.83 sq mi (12.51 km^{2})

Population (2013)
  - Total: 1,107
  - Density: 229.2/sq mi (88.49/km^{2})
- Time zone: UTC+1 (CET)
  - Summer (DST): UTC+2 (CEST)

Tomina is a village in the municipality of Sanski Most, Federation of Bosnia and Herzegovina, Bosnia and Herzegovina.

== Demographics ==
According to the 2013 census, its population was 1,107.

Ethnicity in 2013
Ethnicity	Number	Percentage
Bosniaks	999	90.2%
Serbs	105	9.5%
other/undeclared	3	0.3%
Total	1,107	100%
