= Tea (album) =

2024 studio album by Tea Tairović

Studio album by Tea Tairović
- Released: 31 May 2024
- Genre: Pop-folk
- Length: 37:11
- Language: Serbian
- Label: T Music
- Producer: Bojan Vasić; Jan Borić; Marko Gluhaković; Petar Vujović; Saša Nikolić

Tea Tairović chronology
Balerina (2023)	Tea (2024)	Aska (2025)

Singles from Tea
- 1. "Tea" Released: 30 May 2024

Tea (stylized in all caps) is the third studio album by Serbian singer-songwriter Tea Tairović. It was released on 31 May 2024 through Tairović's independent record label T Music. The album features twelve tracks, along with the single of the same name as the album. The tracks were produced by Bojan Vasić, Jan Borić, Marko Gluhaković, Petar Vujović and Saša Nikolić. Tairović wrote all the songs on the album, apart from "Pec", and collaborated with Gluhaković, Marius de la Focșani, Florin Necșoiu and Kyriakos Papadopulus on the album's music. All tracks are supported by music videos.

Tea saw commercial success. It also debuted on the official chart in Austria and was supported by Tairović's third big regional Neka Gori Balkan Tour.

== Track listing ==
Tea track listing
No.	Title	Lyrics	Music	Length
1.	"Zbogom ljubavi"	Tea Tairović	Marko Gluhaković	3:01
2.	"Bakšiš"	Tairović	Kyriakos Papadopulus	3:11
3.	"Pozovi"	Tairović	Gluhaković	3:00
4.	"Tea"	Tairović; Pavle Subotić	Bunicu Pământului; Moș Ion Roacker; Gabi din Berlin	2:16
5.	"Pec"	Subotić	Marius de la Focșani; Florin Necșoiu	3:00
6.	"Naivčina"	Tairović	Gluhaković	3:50
7.	"Titanik"	Tairović	Tairović	3:52
8.	"TeaNucci" (with Nucci)	Tairović; Igor Panić	Focșani; Necșoiu	2:14
9.	"Ola"	Tairović	Papadopulus	2:19
10.	"Nek ti je srećno"	Tairović	Papadopulus	3:39
11.	"Udri"	Tairović	Gluhaković	2:47
12.	"Ime mi je ljubav"	Tairović	Papadopulus	3:17
13.	"Veštica"	Tairović	Gluhaković	2:57
Total length:				37:11

Notes

- "Bakšiš" is a cover of "Poso se thelo" (2022), written by Konstantinos Argyros and Petros Iakovidis and composed by Kyriakos Papadopoulos, as performed by Argyros.
- "Tea" is a cover of "Burj Khalifa" (2024), written and composed by Bunicu Pământului, Moș Ion Roacker and Gabi din Berlin, as performed by Tzancă Uraganu.
- "Pec" is a cover of "Scot dusmanii la bordura" (2023), written and composed by Marius de la Focșani, as performed by Tzancă Uraganu.
- "TeaNucci" is a cover of "Alo baza baza" (2023), written and composed by Marius de la Focșani, as performed by Tzancă Uraganu and Mr. Juve.

== Charts ==
Chart performance for Tea
Chart (2024)	Peak position
Austrian Albums (Ö3 Austria)	39

== Release history ==
Release history for Tea
Region	Date	Format	Label	Ref.
Europe	31 May 2024	Digital download; streaming	T Music	
Worldwide	1 June 2024	Digital download; streaming	T Music	
