= Vidim te kad =

Studio album by Ana Stanić
- Released: 1999
- Recorded: 1998–1999
- Genre: Pop
- Length: 47:41
- Label: PGP-RTS
- Producer: Ana Stanić, Mirko Vukomanović

Ana Stanić chronology
Metar iznad asfalta (1998)	Vidim te kad (1999)	Tri (2002)

Singles from Vidim te kad
- 1. "Vidim te kad..." Released: 1999; 2. "Skrivanje" Released: 1999; 3. "Taj koji zna" Released: 2000

Vidim te kad (English: I See You When) is a 1999 album by Serbian pop singer Ana Stanić. The album was released in summer 1998.

The album contains 14 songs, including one 35 seconds intro and one bonus track (a lead single remix). Three singles were released and videos were shot for all the three singles off the album.

== Track list ==
1. "Intro" — 0:35
2. "Taj koji zna" — 3:34
3. "Nepokret" — 3:15
4. "Tamno nebo" — 3:56
5. "Brodovi" — 3:28
6. "Skrivanje" — 3:17
7. "O Sreći" — 3:51
8. "Svetionik" — 3:56
9. "Vidim te kad..." — 4:23
10. "Neon" — 3:41
11. "Jutro posle" — 3:27
12. "Obale sna" — 3:41
13. "Staze do tebe" — 3:44
14. "Vidim te kad... (Andrej Aćin Remix)" (Hidden Track)

== Similarities ==
- The chorus melody of the Ana Stanić's song "Taj koji zna" is borrowed from the Madonna's song "Like A Prayer".
