= Brestač =

Brestač Брестач (Serbian)
- Village (Selo)
- Location within Vojvodina Location within Serbia Location within Europe
- Coordinates: 44°52′N 19°54′E
- Country: Serbia
- Province: Vojvodina
- District: Srem District
- Municipality: Pećinci

Population (2022)
  - Total: 869
- Time zone: UTC+1 (CET)
  - Summer (DST): UTC+2 (CEST)

Brestač (Serbian Cyrillic: Брестач) is a village in Serbia. It is situated in the Pećinci municipality, in the Srem District, Vojvodina province. The village has a Serb ethnic majority and its population numbering 869 people (2022 census).

== Features ==
Brestač contains three small stores. In the center of the village, there are two stores, a school (grades K-4), a church, a post office, and a small concert hall.

== See also ==
- List of places in Serbia
- List of cities, towns and villages in Vojvodina
