= Dr Iggy =

Serbian pop singer

- Born: Igor Todorović; 22 November 1970 (age 55); Belgrade, SR Serbia, SFR Yugoslavia
- Genres: Eurodance, Europop, Pop rap
- Instrument: Vocals
- Years active: 1995-2010, 2014-present
- Labels: PGP-RTS, ITV Melomarket, CentroScena, Košava, City Records

Igor Todorović (born 22 November 1970, in Belgrade), known as Dr Iggy is a Serbian Eurodance musician. He celebrated his birthday with a concert at the Sava Center 1996. Besides "Oči boje duge", his most popular songs are "Nikad", "Kao pre", "Pusti me da živim", "Uzalud se trudiš", "Biću tu", and more.

== Discography ==
=== Albums ===
Dr Iggy released the following albums:

- Oči boje duge (1995)
- Kao pre (1996)
- Kada reči nisu potrebne (1998)
- Zbog tebe (2000)
- Sve (2002)
