= U ogledalu =

Studio album by Ana Stanić
- Released: 2004
- Recorded: 2003–2004
- Genre: Pop
- Length: 37:53
- Label: City Records
- Producer: Voja Aralica, Vlado Georgiev

Ana Stanić chronology
Tri (2002)	U ogledalu (2004)	Sudar (2008)

Singles from U ogledalu
- 1. "Pogrešan" Released: 2004; 2. "Trag ljubomore" Released: 2004; 3. "Veliko A" Released: 2004; 4. "Nađi me" Released: 2004

U ogledalu (English: In the Mirror) is a 2004 album by Serbian pop singer Ana Stanić. It was released in 2004.

The album contains 10 songs. One of the producers was popular Montenegrin pop singer and producer Vlado Georgiev. Her first hit-single off the album titled "Pogrešan" was published under the label "BK Sound", but after a while, Ana's made a transfer into City Records and surprisingly published her album, and rest of the singles from it, under this label.

== Track list ==
1. "Veliko A" — 3:33
2. "Trag ljubomore" — 3:48
3. "Preživeću" — 3:33
4. "Pogrešan" — 3:58
5. "Srce me laže" — 3:47
6. "Fališ mi sve vreme" — 3:56
7. "Reč za utehu" — 3:29
8. "Obična ljubav" — 3:52
9. "Nađi me" — 3:37
10. "Tu nema reči" — 4:20
