= Sudar (surname) =

Sudar or Sudár is a surname. Notable people with the surname include:

- Attila Sudár (born 1954), Hungarian water polo player
- Darko Raić-Sudar (born 1972), Croatian footballer
- Pero Sudar (born 1951), Bosnian auxiliary bishop
- Tamás Sudár (1941–2021), Hungarian ski jumper
