= Milan Dinčić =

Serbian singer

Milan Dinčić (Cyrillic: Милан Динчић) is a Serbian singer. He was discovered in the music talent show, Zvezde Granda where he won the third place in 2007.

His hit songs include Bubo, Bubice, Ti Si Žena Za Sva Vremena, Vratio Sam Se and Digni me pao sam. On the show, Milan Dinčić was given the nickname "Dinča", because there were two "Milans" – Milan Dinčić and Milan Stanković. Milan Dincic was given the nickname "Dinča" to make it easier for the audience and the producers to distinguish the two.

== Discography ==
- "Dinča" – 1.Vratio sam se 2.Emotivni invalidi 3.Odlazim 4.Zaljubio se 5.Loše si spavala 6.Digni me pao sam 7.Srećna budala 8.Bubo 9.Neznanka.
