= Sudar (album) =

Studio album by Ana Stanić
- Released: 10 March 2008
- Recorded: 2007–2008
- Genre: Pop, R&B, dance, pop rock
- Length: 53:16
- Label: PGP
- Producer: Ana Stanić, Sky Wikluh, Mirko Vukomanović, Baby Dooks, Vladan Popović, Ivan Ilić

Ana Stanić chronology
U ogledalu (2004)	Sudar (2008)

Singles from Sudar
- 1. "Udahni me" Released: 2006; 2. "Luda" Released: 2007; 3. "Više nisi moj (ft. Sky Wikluh)" Released: 2008; 4. "Ljubav do neba" Released: 2008; 5. "I to je ljubav" Released: 2009

Sudar (English: Crash) is a 2008 album by Serbian pop singer Ana Stanić. It was released on March 10, 2008.

The album contains 13 songs and one bonus. One of the producers was popular Serbian hip hop singer and producer Sky Wikluh. Ana Stanić promoted her fifth studio album at the roof of The Army Home in Belgrade, on June 17.

== Track list ==
1. "Sudar" — 3:47
2. "Klinka" — 3:16
3. "Više nisi moj" (featuring Sky Wikluh) — 3:15
4. "Nepopravljiva" — 4:28
5. "Ljubav do neba" — 3:53
6. "I to je ljubav" — 3:37
7. "Hotel" — 3:45
8. "Luda" — 3:25
9. "Znam" — 3:46
10. "Opasan" — 3:20
11. "Bežim od sebe" — 3:27
12. "Reci mi sve" — 1:14
13. "Bioskop" — 4:41
14. "Udahni me" — 3:13 (bonus track)

== Release history ==
Country	Date
Serbia	10 March 2008
Montenegro	11 March 2008
Bosnia and Herzegovina	11 March 2008
