= Nikolija discography =

- Studio albums: 5
- Live albums: 1
- Singles: 45
- Music videos: 47
- Promotional singles: 7

Serbian singer and rapper Nikolija has released five studio albums and 45 singles (including three as a featured artist). She debuted in April 2013 with the single "Ćao zdravo". Her debut album, №1, was released in October 2016 featuring previously released songs and three new tracks. It was sold in 50,000 copies. In April 2019, Nikolija released her second studio album, Yin & Yang, digitally as well as in an exclusive printing. Yin & Yang produced two singles: the title track and "Nije lako biti ja" featuring Serbian rapper Fox. Her third album, Aurora, was released digitally on 4 December 2022. It was followed by Lavina on 15 December 2024.

Nikolija has also released over forty music videos, which collectively have accumulated over half a billion views. Her most viewed music video, "Alkohola litar" (2014) with Elitni Odredi and DJ Mlađa, has over 86 million views, as of October 2026. The music video for "Opasna igra" was declared as the most Serbian viewed video on YouTube in 2015.

== Albums ==
=== Studio albums ===
List of studio albums, showing release date, label, chart positions and track listing
Title	Details	Peak chart positions		Notes
Title	Details	AUT	SUI	Notes
№1	Released: 20 October 2016; Label: City Records; Formats: CD, digital download, streaming	—	—	Track listing: | No. | Title | Length | |---|---|---| | 1. | "Niko kao mi" | 3:40 | | 2. | "101 propušten poziv" | 2:57 | | 3. | "Kako posle mene" | 3:23 | | 4. | "Nikolija" | 3:26 | | 5. | "Pucaj zbog nas" | 3:36 | | 6. | "Opasna igra" | 2:59 | | 7. | "Alkohola litar" (featuring Elitni Odredi and DJ Mlađa) | 3:18 | | 8. | "Ćao zdravo" (featuring Teča) | 4:04 | | 9. | "Plavo more" | 3:52 | | 10. | "Ljubavni maneken" | 3:37 | | Total length: | | 34:56 |
Yin & Yang	Released: 25 April 2019; Label: IDJTunes; Formats: CD, digital download, streaming	—	—	Track listing: Digital edition | No. | Title | Length | |---|---|---| | 1. | "Yin & Yang" | 3:25 | | 2. | "Nije lako biti ja" (featuring Fox) | 2:54 | | 3. | "Što mi radi to" | 3:08 | | 4. | "Dama bez pardona" | 2:39 | | 5. | "Ove noći" | 2:50 | | 6. | "Harizma" | 2:58 | | 7. | "Tigar" | 2:21 | | Total length: | | 20:16 | Physical edition | No. | Title | Length | |---|---|---| | 8. | "Loš momak" | 3:27 | | 9. | "Slažem" | 3:25 | | 10. | "Nema limita" | 3:30 | | Total length: | | 30:39 |
Aurora	Released: 4 December 2022; Label: Made in BLKN; Formats: Digital download, streaming	—	—	Track listing: | No. | Title | Length | |---|---|---| | 1. | "Gringo" | 2:31 | | 2. | "Gle gle" | 2:20 | | 3. | "Aurora" (featuring Amna) | 2:52 | | 4. | "Bez nakita" | 2:53 | | 5. | "Dodole" | 2:22 | | 6. | "Pilot" | 2:39 | | 7. | "Gucci mama" | 1:55 | | Total length: | | 17:34 |
Lavina	Released: 15 March 2024; Label: Made in BLKN; Formats: Digital download, streaming	18	38	Track listing: | No. | Title | Length | |---|---|---| | 1. | "Lavina" | 2:47 | | 2. | "Emotivno" | 2:21 | | 3. | "Viski" (featuring Inas) | 2:23 | | 4. | "Nenormalan lik" (featuring Devito) | 2:15 | | 5. | "Kada se ljube bivši" | 2:52 | | 6. | "Testo" (featuring Amna) | 2:59 | | 7. | "Milo moje" (featuring THCF) | 2:18 | | 8. | "Namami" | 2:10 | | 9. | "Džungla" (featuring Eevke and 8Nula8) | 2:59 | | 10. | "Barbie" | 2:42 | | 11. | "Pravo na grešku" | 3:16 | | Total length: | | 29:06 |
Sila	Released: 25 April 2025; Label: Made in BLKN; Formats: Digital download, streaming	64	—	Track listing: | No. | Title | Length | |---|---|---| | 1. | "Svim silama" | | 2. | "Afera" | | 3. | "Bezobrazluk" | | 4. | "Drugovi budale" | 2:21 | | 5. | "Berliner" | | 6. | "Samo mene ljubi" | | 7. | "Malena" | | 8. | "Inferno" | | 9. | "Siguran u zlo" | | 10. | "Butiq" (featuring Eevke and 8Nula8) | | 11. | "Baksuz" |

=== Live albums ===
List of live albums, showing release date, label and chart positions
Title	Details
Live Session	Released: 3 February 2025; Label: Made in BLKN; Formats: Digital download, streaming

== Singles ==
=== As lead artist ===
Title	Year	Peak chart positions	Album
Title	Year	CRO Billb.	Album
"Ćao zdravo" (featuring Teča)	2013	(Note: Croatia Songs was launched on 15 February 2022.)	№1
"Opasna igra"	2015	(Note: Croatia Songs was launched on 15 February 2022.)	№1
"Ljubavni maneken"	2015	(Note: Croatia Songs was launched on 15 February 2022.)	№1
"Pucaj zbog nas"	2016	(Note: Croatia Songs was launched on 15 February 2022.)	№1
"101 propušten poziv"	2016	(Note: Croatia Songs was launched on 15 February 2022.)	№1
"Promeni mi planove"	2017	(Note: Croatia Songs was launched on 15 February 2022.)	Non-album single
"Loš momak" (Note: "Loš momak", "Nema limita" and "Slažem" are included only in the physical edition of Yin & Yang.)	2017	(Note: Croatia Songs was launched on 15 February 2022.)	Yin & Yang
"Moj tempo"	2017	(Note: Croatia Songs was launched on 15 February 2022.)	Non-album singles
"Malo"	2018	(Note: Croatia Songs was launched on 15 February 2022.)	Non-album singles
"Nema limita"	2018	(Note: Croatia Songs was launched on 15 February 2022.)	Yin & Yang
"Slažem"	2018	(Note: Croatia Songs was launched on 15 February 2022.)	Yin & Yang
"Yin & Yang"	2019	(Note: Croatia Songs was launched on 15 February 2022.)	Yin & Yang
"Nije lako biti ja" (featuring Fox)	2019	(Note: Croatia Songs was launched on 15 February 2022.)	Yin & Yang
"Sija grad"	2019	(Note: Croatia Songs was launched on 15 February 2022.)	Non-album singles
"Stav milionera"	2020	(Note: Croatia Songs was launched on 15 February 2022.)	Non-album singles
"Nakit"	2020	(Note: Croatia Songs was launched on 15 February 2022.)	Non-album singles
"No plaky"	2020	(Note: Croatia Songs was launched on 15 February 2022.)	Non-album singles
"O bivšima"	2020	(Note: Croatia Songs was launched on 15 February 2022.)	Non-album singles
"High Life"	2020	(Note: Croatia Songs was launched on 15 February 2022.)	Non-album singles
"Sve bih"	2021	(Note: Croatia Songs was launched on 15 February 2022.)	Non-album singles
"Ulice" (with Teya Dora)	2021	(Note: Croatia Songs was launched on 15 February 2022.)	Non-album singles
"Divlja orhideja"	2021	(Note: Croatia Songs was launched on 15 February 2022.)	Non-album singles
"Gringo"	2022	—	Aurora
"Gle gle"	2022	—	Aurora
"Ljubav" (with Devito)	2022	—	Non-album single
"Aurora" (with Amna)	2022	24	Aurora
"Bez nakita"	2022	—	Aurora
"Dodole"	2022	—	Aurora
"Pilot"	2022	—	Aurora
"Gucci mama"	2022	—	Aurora
"Prezime"	2023	—	Non-album singles
"Nicky"	2023	—	Non-album singles
"Avlije avlije"	2023	—	Non-album singles
"Ljubi jako"	2023	—	Non-album singles
"3 po 3" (with Biba)	2024	—	Karamela
"Drugovi budale"	2025	—	Sila
"MDMA" (with Biba)	2025	1	Non-album singles
"U sobi greh"	2026	—	Non-album singles
"Amigo"	2026	—	Non-album singles
"Srpkinje" (with Mimi Mercedez)	2026	—	Non-album singles
"Pitbull"	2026	—	Non-album singles
"Miris Mediterana"	2026	—	Non-album singles
"—" denotes a recording that did not chart.

=== As featured artist ===
Title	Year	Album
"Alkohola litar" (Elitni Odredi featuring DJ Mlađa and Nikolija)	2014	№1
"Premija" (Dado Polumenta featuring Nikolija)	2014	Non-album single
"Meduza" (Relja featuring Nikolija)	2019	Made in Balkan

=== Promotional singles ===
Title	Year	Peak chart positions	Album
Title	Year	CRO Billb.	Album
"Ama lome me" (Devito featuring Nikolija)	2023	—	Plava krv
"Viski" (with Inas)	2024	7	Lavina
"Testo" (with Amna)	2024	14	Lavina
"Nenormalan lik" (with Devito)	2024	3	Lavina
"Milo moje" (with THCF)	2024	—	Lavina
"Džungla" (with Eevke and 8Nula8)	2024	—	Lavina
"Butiq" (with Eevke and 8Nula8)	2025	—	Sila
"—" denotes a recording that did not chart.

== Other charted songs ==
List of other charted songs, with selected chart positions, showing year released and album name
Title	Year	Peak chart positions	Album
Title	Year	CRO Billb.	Album
"Emotivno"	2024	19	Lavina
"Baš ti se sviđa" (Relja featuring Nikolija)	2025	3	Hotel Jugoslavija

== Guest appearances ==
List of non-single guest appearances, with other performing artists, showing year released and album name
Title	Year	Other artist(s)	Album
"Crazy 2night" (as Nicole)	2011	DJ Kas	Non-album song
"Milion dolara"	2013	Ana Nikolić	Milion dolara
"Baš ti se sviđa"	2025	Relja	Hotel Jugoslavija
"U lov"	2025	Amna	Takva sam
"Zimi leto"	2026	Vekac	III

== Music videos ==
List of music videos, showing featured artist, year released, director and YouTube views
Title	Year	Director(s)	Views (in millions) (Note: As of April 2023)	Ref.
"Ćao zdravo" (feat. Techa)	2013	Andrej Ilić	6	
"Milion dolara" (with Ana Nikolić)	2013	Ana Nikolić	31.9	
"Nikolija"	2013	Dimitrije Joković	9.8	
"Alkohola litar" (with DJ Mlađa and Elitni Odredi)	2014	Vedad Jašarević	75	
"Kako posle mene"	2014	Toxic Entertainment	28	
"Premija" (with Dado Polumenta)	2014	Toxic Entertainment	13	
"Opasna igra"	2015	Andrej Ilić, Pedram Voss	48	
"Ljubavni maneken"	2015	Toxic Entertainment, Ljubba	6	
"Niko kao mi"	2016	Toxic Entertainment, Ljubba	10	
"101 propušten poziv"	2016	Toxic Entertainment, Ljubba	13	
"Pucaj zbog nas"	2016	Toxic Entertainment, Ljubba	12	
"Plavo more"	2016	Toxic Entertainment, Ljubba	21	
"Promeni mi planove"	2017	Đorđe Trbović, Ljubba	18	
"Loš momak"	2017	Sherif Francis	47	
"Moj tempo"	2017	Ljubba	10	
"Malo"	2018	Đorđe Trbović	15	
"Nema limita"	2018	Nemanja Ćeranić	47	
"Slažem"	2018	Nemanja Ćeranić	25	
"Yin & Yang"	2019	Ljubba	15	
"Nije lako biti ja" (with Fox)	2019	Đorđe Trbović	15	
"Dama bez pardona"	2019	Sherif Francis	8.3	
"Harizma"	2019	Sherif Francis	32	
"Ove noći"	2019	Sherif Francis	2.4	
"Tigar"	2019	Ljubba	2.2	
"Šta mi radi to"	2019	Sherif Francis	4.2	
"Meduza" (with Relja)	2019	Ivan Stojiljković	39	
"Sija grad"	2019	Sherif Francis	12	
"Stav milionera"	2020	David Ljubenović	5.7	
"Nakit"	2020	Kreppo Studio	8.8	
"No plaky"	2020	Sherif Francis	12	
"O bivšima"	2020	Ljubba	21	
"High Life"	2020	Ljubba	12	
"Sve bih"	2021	Kreppo Studio	4.7	
"Ulice" (with Teya Dora)	2021	Nemanja Novaković	2.3	
"Divlja orhideja"	2021	Ljubba	1.1	
"Gringo"	2022	Sherif Francis	10	
"Gle gle"	2022	Sherif Francis	3.7	
"Ljubav" (with Devito)	2022	Sherif Francis	17	
"Aurora" (with Amna)	2022	Sherif Francis	14	
"Bez nakita"	2022	Sherif Francis	1.2	
"Dodole"	2022	Petar kačketdole, dffrntvibe	5	
"Pilot"	2022	Igor Zečević	0.7	
"Prezime"	2023	Theodore Selekos	2	
"Nicky"	2023	Luka Sepčić	1	
"Avlije avlije"	2023	Marija Djondovic; Petar kacketdole	0.9	
"Ljubi jako"	2023	Nikolija Jovanović; Teodora Jovanović	3	
