= Premija =

Single by Dado Polumenta featuring Nikolija
- Released: 28 December 2014
- Recorded: 2014
- Genre: pop-folk
- Length: 4:10
- Songwriters: Pavle Radulović; Gordana Gvozdenović
- Producer: Toxic entertainment

Nikolija singles chronology
"Gužva je u gradu" (2014)	"Premija" (2014)	"Za tebe uvjek biću tu, s kraja svjeta ja ću doći" (2015)

Nikolija singles chronology
"Kako posle mene" (2014)	"Premija" (2014)	"Opasna igra" (2015)

Premija (English:Premium) is a duet recorded by Montenegrin singer Dado Polumenta featuring Serbian recording artist Nikolija. It was in Polumenta's recognizable pop-folk style, but it was different from Nikolija's previous work. Toxic entertainment did the music video, in which Dado and Nikolija are shown as con-artists in a casino. Dado works as a security guard, and Nikolija is gambling on the roulette wheel.

Vesna Zmijanac, Nikolija's mother and Polumenta's friend, brought them together. The song was not planned, but it was done relatively quickly. Because the New Year was near, they said that the song was a present for their fans.
