= Zverka =

Zverka may refer to:

- "Zverka", a track from the 2025 album Hotel Jugoslavija by Serbian rapper Relja Popović
- Serbian-language title for "Zvjerka", a 2016 single by Bosnian pop recording artist Selma Bajrami and a track in her 2024 album Embargo
