= No1 (Nikolija album) =

2016 album by Nikolija

№1

Studio album by Nikolija
- Released: 20 October 2016
- Recorded: 2013–16
- Genre: Electropop; hip hop; pop-folk
- Length: 34:52
- Label: City Records
- Producer: Atelje Trag; One Music; Atelje Impuls; DH Music

Nikolija chronology
№1 (2016)	Yin & Yang (2019)

Singles from Yin & Yang
- 1. "Ćao zdravo" Released: April 9, 2013; 2. "Alkohola litar" Released: August 31, 2014; 3. "Opasna igra" Released: August 15, 2018; 4. "Ljubavni maneken" Released: October 20, 2015; 5. "Pucaj zbog nas" Released: October 14, 2016; 6. "101 propušten poziv" Released: October 14, 2016

No1 (pronounced "Number one"; stylized as №1) is the debut studio album by Serbian recording artist Nikolija. It was released through City Records on 20 October 2016, which was a day after Nikolija's 27th birthday and about one month and a week after she had given birth to her first daughter. The album includes seven songs from the beginning of her career and three new ones: "101 propušteni poziv", "Plavo more" and "Pucaj zbog nas". It features guest appearance from the rap duo Elitni Odredi.

No1 was sold in 50,000 copies. Furthermore, all the tracks are accompanied by a music video, which have collectively amassed over 200 million views on YouTube, as of October 2021.

== Background ==
Nikolija officially began her music career with the release of her first single, "Ćao Zdravo", featuring Techa on 9 April 2013. It was followed by "Nikolija" in November. The following year, she released "Alkohola litar" with Elitni Odredi and "Kako posle mene" in August and October, respectively. With over 70 million views, "Alkohola litar" remains Nikolija's highest perfuming music video. Her forthcoming single, "Opasna igra", released in August 2015, was also declared the most viewed Serbian video on YouTube of that year.

In January 2016, while promoting "Ljubavni maneken", Nikolija revealed that she had recorded three news songs which were supposed to be included to her debut album. On 14 October, she released "101 propušteni poziv", "Plavo more" and "Pucaj zbog nas".

== Track listing ==
№1
No.	Title	Writer(s)	Producer(s)	Length
1.	"Niko kao mi"	Marko Peruničić; Nebojša Arežina; Đorđe Đorđević	Atelje Trag	3:40
2.	"101 propušten poziv"	Damir Handanović; Đorđević	DH Music	2:57
3.	"Kako posle mene"	Peruničić; Arežina; Vuksan Bilanović; Marko Rodić	Atelje Trag	3:23
4.	"Nikolija"	Perunčić; Arežina; Extravagant Music Group; Rodić	Atelje Trag	3:26
5.	"Pucaj zbog nas"	Filip Mladenović; Senad Bislimi; Ivan Obradović; Relja Popović; Đorđević	One Music; Atelje Impuls	3:36
6.	"Opasna igra"	Peruničić; Arežina; Bislimi; Obradović; Popović; Đorđević	Atelje Trag	2:59
7.	"Alkohola litar" (featuring Elitni Odredi and DJ Mlađa)	Bislimi; Obradović; Popović; Vlada Matović; Đorđević	DJ Mlađa; Atelje Impuls	3:18
8.	"Ćao zdravo" (featuring Techa)	Peruničić; Arežina; Siniša Pešić	Atelje Trag	4:04
9.	"Plavo more"	Bislimi; Obradović; Popović; Đorđević	Atelje Impuls	3:52
10.	"Ljubavni maneken"	Petar Stokanović	Atelje Trag	3:37
Total length:				34:56

== Personnel ==
Credits adapted from the album's liner notes

Performers and musicians

- Nikolija – vocals
- Elitni Odredi – rap (track 7)
- Techa – rap (track 8)
- Marko Peruničić - background vocals (tracks 1 and 4)
- Damir Handanović – background vocals (track 2)
- Suzana Branković – background vocals (tracks 2, 3, 5 and 9)
- Relja Popović – background vocals (tracks 3, 5 and 9)
- Ksenija Milanković - background vocals (track 6)
- Lejla Hot – background vocals (track 7)
- Ivana Peters - background vocals (tracks 8 and 10)
- Eljez Šabani – clarinet and saxophone (tracks 3, 5 and 6)
- Petar Trumbetaš – guitar (track 5)
- Senad Bislimi and Ivan Obradović - keyboards (track 7)
- Dimitrios Gaidztsis - keyboards (track 7)
- DJ Mlađa - keyboards (track 7)
- Marko Peruničić and Nebojša Arežina - percussion instruments, keyboards (track 10)
- P. Manov – el. guitar and bouzouki (track 10)
- Alen Stajić - piano and keyboards (track 10)

Design and management

- Marko Vulević – photography
- Stanislav Zakić - graphic design
- Srđan Petković – hair and makeup
- Stefan Orlić – Styling

== Release history ==
List of regions, release dates, showing formats and label
Country	Date	Format	Label
Serbia	October 20, 2016	CD; digital download; streaming	City Records
