= Ples sa Zvezdama season 1 =

Ples sa Zvezdama
- Season 1
- No. of episodes: 12

Release
- Original release: 29 March – 16 June 2014

Season one of Ples sa zvezdama premiered on March 29, 2014. Ten pairs participated. Milojko Pantić and Tamara Paunović were confirmed by Prva on March 9, 2014, while Lena Bogdanović and Niggor were confirmed two days later. On March 12, 2014, Prva announced that Saša Vidić and Katarina Šišmanović will also be in the competition. Nikolija Jovanović and Ivan Mihailović were announced on March 13, 2014. On March 14, 2014, Prva said actress Tanja Bošković will also be in the competition. Prva announced four judges: Nikola Mandić, Marija Prelević, Aleksandar Josipović and Konstantin Kostjukov. Milan Kalinić and Tanja Petrović were announced on March 18, 2014. Last announced contestant was Aleksandar Šapić, former water polo player and politician, who was announced on March 19, 2014. It was said that 12 contestants will be competing, but on March 20, 2014, Prva confirmed that Vanesa Šokčić and Nikola Nemešević – Nemeš will also be in the show.

== Couples ==
Celebrity	Occupation / known for	Professional partner	Status
Saša Vidić	fashion designer	Ana Mijailović	Eliminated 1st on April 7, 2014
Tamara Paunović	model	Mirko Knežević	Eliminated 2nd on April 14, 2014
Katarina Šišmanović	television host	Aleksandar Veljković	Eliminated 3rd on April 21, 2014
Nemeš	musician	Marija Jovanović	Eliminated 4th on April 28, 2014
Milan Kalinić	actor	Jelena Kolarović	Withdrew on May 4, 2014
Milojko Pantić	sports commentator	Zorana Miljkovac	Eliminated 5th on May 5, 2014
Nikolija Jovanović	singer	Ignjat Filipović	Eliminated 6th on May 12, 2014
Lena Bogdanović	actress	Nikola Tomašević Mirko Knežević (from week 6)	Eliminated 7th on May 29, 2014
Niggor	singer	Jelena Borović	Eliminated 8th on June 2, 2014
Vanesa Šokčić	singer	Vlada Todorović	Eliminated 8th on June 9, 2014
Aleksandar Šapić	water polo player / politician	Slađana Ivanišević	Eliminated 8th on June 11, 2014
Tanja Bošković	actress	Marko Mićić	Runners-Up
Ivan Mihailović	actor	Marija Martinović	Winners
Tanja Petrović	martial artist	Marko Vasiljević	Third-Place

== Rules ==
The contestant pairs consist of a celebrity paired with a professional dancer. Past celebrity contestants include professional and Olympic athletes, supermodels, actors and singers. Each couple performs predetermined dances and competes against the others for judges' points and audience votes. The couple receiving the lowest combined total of judges' points and audience votes is eliminated each week until only the champion dance pair remains. Every pair has to dance following dances: cha-cha-cha, jive, foxtrot, samba, rumba, tango, pasodoble, quickstep, waltz and Viennese Waltz.

== Scoring chart ==
Red numbers indicate the couples with the lowest score for each week.
Green numbers indicate the couples with the highest score for each week.
indicates the couple (or couples) eliminated that week.
indicates the winning couple.
indicates the runner-up couple.
indicates the third-place couple.
the returning couple finishing in the bottom two (or three)
the couple withdrew from the competition
the couple had immunity that week

Couple	Place	1	2	3	4	5	6	7	8	9	10	11	12
Vanesa & Vlada	5	26	43	36	36	39	32	28	35+38=73	38			
Tanja B. & Marko	2	36	32	39	42	46	42	40	37+39=76				
Ivan & Marija	1	36	38	37	41	41	42	37	34+39=73				
Tanja P. & Marko	3	37	33	39	38	41	46	40	38+39=77				
Aleksandar & Slađana	4	31	30	36	30	43	29	36	25+38=63				
Niggor & Jelena	6	24	32	35	25	33	26	41	27+38=65				
Lena & Nikola	7	34	42	40	44	34	43	32					
Nikolija & Ignjat	8	23	31	34	41	45	40						
Milojko & Zorana	9	22	27	27	24	28							
Milan & Jelena	10	33	34	36	45	—							
Nemeš & Marija	11	27	33	26	35								
Katarina & Aleksandar	12	26	40	28									
Tamara & Mirko	13	17	23										
Saša & Ana	14	16											

== Weekly scores ==
Unless indicated otherwise, individual judges scores in the charts below (given in parentheses) are listed in this order from left to right: Aleksandar Josipović, Marija Prelević, Nikola Mandić, Konstantin Kostjukov.

=== Week 1 ===
Music guest: Željko Samardžić

Running order

Couple	Score	Dance
Lena & Nikola	28 (7, 7, 7, 7) + 6 = 34	Samba
Tanja B. & Marko	31 (8, 8, 7, 8) + 5 = 36	Tango
Nikolija & Ignjat	19 (4, 5, 5, 5) + 4 = 23	Cha-cha-cha
Niggor & Jelena	22 (5, 5, 6, 6) + 2 = 24	Samba
Nemeš & Marija	21 (5, 6, 4, 6) + 6 = 27	Foxtrot
Katarina & Aleksandar	27 (6, 7, 7, 7) + 4 = 31	Charleston
Tamara & Mirko	13 (2, 4, 4, 3) + 4 = 17	Rumba
Milojko & Zorana	17 (3, 4, 5, 5) + 5 = 22	Salsa
Tanja P. & Marko	30 (7, 7, 8, 8) + 7 = 37	Viennese Waltz
Ivan & Marija	30 (7, 7, 8, 8) + 6 = 36	Tango
Milan & Jelena	28 (7, 7, 7, 7) + 5 = 33	Jive
Vanesa & Vlada	23 (6, 6, 6, 5) + 3 = 26	American Smooth
Saša & Ana	13 (2, 3, 4, 4) + 3 = 16	Pasodoble
Aleksandar & Slađana	22 (5, 5, 6, 6) + 4 = 26	Rumba

After last couple finished dancing, every couple had to dance Viennese Waltz for 30 seconds. Marija Prelević gave score in the name of the judges (from 1 to 10). These points were added to points from the first dance, and they got the final result. All points were later made into points from 1 to 14 (couple with the biggest score got 14 points, and couple with the lowest score got 1 point).

=== Week 2 ===
Running order

Couple	Score	Dance
Tamara & Mirko	18 (4, 5, 5, 4) + 5 = 23	Tango
Tanja P. & Marko	26 (6, 7, 7, 6) + 7 = 33	Samba
Niggor & Jelena	24 (6, 6, 6, 6) + 8 = 32	Rumba
Katarina & Aleksandar	25 (6, 6, 7, 6) + 5 = 30	Pasodoble
Aleksandar & Slađana	31 (8, 7, 8, 8) + 9 = 40	Charleston
Nemeš & Marija	27 (5, 6, 8, 8) + 6 = 33	Tango
Tanja B. & Marko	27 (6, 7, 7, 7) + 5 = 32	Waltz
Lena & Nikola	34 (9, 8, 9, 8) + 8 = 42	American Smooth
Nikolija & Ignjat	25 (7, 6, 6, 6) + 6 = 31	Jive
Milojko & Zorana	23 (7, 6, 5, 5) + 4 = 27	Pasodoble
Vanesa & Vlada	34 (9, 9, 8, 8) + 9 = 43	Lindy Hop
Ivan & Marija	31 (8, 8, 8, 7) + 7 = 38	Jive
Milan & Jelena	25 (6, 6, 6, 7) + 9 = 34	Mambo

After last couple finished dancing, every couple had to dance bachata for 30 seconds. Marija Prelević gave score in the name of the judges (from 1 to 10). These points were added to points from the first dance, and they got the final result. All points were later made into points from 1 to 14 (couple with the biggest score got 14 points, and couple with the lowest score got 1 point).

=== Week 3 ===
Music guest: Sergej Ćetković

Running order

Couple	Score	Dance
Tanja P. & Marko	33 (8, 9, 8, 8) + 6 = 39	Freestyle
Vanesa & Vlada	33 (9, 9, 8, 7) + 3 = 36	Tango
Niggor & Jelena	31 (8, 8, 8, 7) + 4 = 35	Jazz
Milojko & Zorana	23 (6, 5, 6, 6) + 4 = 27	Waltz
Nemeš & Marija	21 (5, 5, 6, 5) + 5 = 26	Mambo
Tanja B. & Marko	34 (7, 9, 9, 9) + 5 = 39	Pasodoble
Lena & Nikola	34 (8, 8, 9, 9) + 6 = 40	Charleston
Ivan & Marija	32 (8, 8, 8, 8) + 5 = 37	Cha-cha-cha
Aleksandar & Slađana	30 (7, 7, 8, 8) + 6 = 36	Pasodoble
Katarina & Aleksandar	25 (5, 6, 7, 7) + 3 = 28	Salsa
Milan & Jelena	29 (7, 7, 8, 7) + 7 = 36	Waltz
Nikolija & Ignjat	27 (7, 7, 7, 6) + 7 = 34	Contemporary

After last couple finished dancing, every couple had to dance cha-cha-cha for 30 seconds. Marija Prelević gave score in the name of the judges (from 1 to 10). These points were added to points from the first dance, and they got the final result. All points were later made into points from 1 to 14 (couple with the biggest score got 14 points, and couple with the lowest score got 1 point).

=== Week 4 ===
Music guest: Vlado Georgiev

Running order

Couple	Score	Dance
Ivan & Marija	32 (7, 8, 8, 9) + 9 = 41	Rumba
Vanesa & Vlada	30 (7, 7, 8, 8) + 6 = 36	Flamenco
Tanja B. & Marko	32 (7, 8, 8, 9) + 10 = 42	Jive
Lena & Nikola	40 (10, 10, 10, 10) + 4 = 44	Contemporary
Milojko & Zorana	16 (1, 4, 6, 5) + 8 = 24	Jazz
Tanja P. & Marko	29 (6, 7, 8, 8) + 9 = 38	Cha-cha-cha
Milan & Jelena	39 (10, 10, 10, 9) + 6 = 45	Freestyle
Niggor & Jelena	22 (4, 5, 7, 6) + 3 = 25	Mambo
Aleksandar & Slađana	24 (5, 6, 7, 6) + 6 = 30	Jive
Nemeš & Marija	28 (6, 7, 8, 7) + 7 = 35	Pasodoble
Nikolija & Ignjat	34 (9, 9, 8, 8) + 7 = 41	Freestyle

After last couple finished dancing, every couple had to dance quickstep for 30 seconds. Marija Prelević gave score in the name of the judges (from 1 to 10). These points were added to points from the first dance, and they got the final result. All points were later made into points from 1 to 14 (couple with the biggest score got 14 points, and couple with the lowest score got 1 point).

=== Week 5: Serbian Folk Music Night ===
Running order

Couple	Score	Dance
Lena & Nikola	27 (5, 6, 8, 8) + 7 = 34	Rumba
Tanja P. & Marko	31 (7, 7, 8, 9) + 10 = 41	Tango
Ivan & Marija	35 (9, 9, 8, 9) + 6 = 41	Swing
Milojko & Zorana	23 (5, 5, 6, 7) + 5 = 28	Bachata
Nikolija & Ignjat	36 (9, 9, 9, 9) + 9 = 45	Viennese Waltz
Tanja B. & Marko	36 (9, 8, 9, 10) + 10 = 46	American Smooth
Vanesa & Vlada	32 (7, 8, 8, 9) + 7 = 39	Samba
Aleksandar & Slađana	37 (10, 10, 9, 8) + 6 = 43	Freestyle
Niggor & Jelena	27 (6, 7, 7, 7) + 6 = 33	Cha-cha-cha
Milan & Jelena	—	—

At the beginning of the show, Milan Kalinić announced that he was advised to withdraw from the competition due to a problem with his left leg.

After last couple finished dancing, every couple had to dance Viennese Waltz for 30 seconds. Marija Prelević gave score in the name of the judges (from 1 to 10). These points were added to points from the first dance, and they got the final result. All points were later made into points from 1 to 14 (couple with the biggest score got 14 points, and couple with the lowest score got 1 point).

=== Week 6: Movie Night ===
Running order

Couple	Score	Dance
Niggor & Jelena	25 (5, 6, 7, 7) + 1 = 26	Jive
Vanesa & Vlada	30 (7, 7, 8, 8) + 2 = 32	Waltz
Tanja P. & Marko	39 (10, 9, 10, 10) + 7 = 46	Charleston
Tanja B. & Marko	34 (8, 8, 9, 9) + 8 = 42	Charleston
Lena & Mirko	38 (9, 9, 10, 10) + 5 = 43	Tango
Aleksandar & Slađana	26 (6, 6, 7, 7) + 3 = 29	Salsa
Nikolija & Ignjat	34 (8, 8, 9, 9) + 6 = 40	Jive
Ivan & Marija	38 (9, 9, 10, 10) + 4 = 42	Quickstep

Lena's partner, Nikola, hurt his leg while they were rehearsing their dance, so Lena got new partner for this week - Mirko Knežević, who was eliminated in second week.

When all couples finished dancing, it was announced that every couple will be dancing tango at the same time. Judges were eliminating couples one by one. First eliminated couple got 1 point, second eliminated couple got 2 points, etc. Winners were Tanja B. & Marko who got 8 points.

=== Week 7: Love Night ===
Wednesday: Individual judges scores in the chart below (given in parentheses) are listed in this order from left to right: Radoš Bajić, Marija Prelević, Nikola Mandić, Duška Jovanić.
Sunday: Individual judges scores in the chart below (given in parentheses) are listed in this order from left to right: Aleksandar Josipović, Marija Prelević, Nikola Mandić, Konstantin Kostjukov.

Running order

Couple	Wednesday Score	Wednesday Dance	Sunday Score	Sunday Dance
Niggor & Jelena	38 (9, 9, 10, 10) + 3 = 41	Freestyle	27 (6, 6, 8, 7) + 38 = 65	Viennese Waltz
Vanesa & Vlada	28 (8, 6, 7, 7)	Foxtrot	35 (8, 9, 9, 9) + 38 = 73	Pasodoble
Tanja P. & Marko	40 (10, 10, 10, 10)	Rumba	38 (9, 9, 10, 10) + 39 = 77	Salsa
Tanja B. & Marko	37 (10, 9, 9, 9) + 3 = 40	Foxtrot	37 (10, 8, 9, 10) + 39 = 76	Freestyle
Lena & Mirko	29 (8, 6, 7, 8) + 3 = 32	Cha-cha-cha		
Aleksandar & Slađana	36 (9, 9, 9, 9)	Tango	25 (5, 6, 7, 7) + 38 = 63	Cha-cha-cha
Ivan & Marija	37 (10, 9, 9, 9)	Samba	34 (7, 9, 9, 9) + 39 = 73	Waltz

Due to floods in Serbia, there were no episodes on 18 and 25 May. It was later announced that there will be two episodes in week 7 - one on 28 May (Wednesday) and other one on 1 June (Sunday). This means there will be a double elimination this week. Lena's partner, Nikola Tomašević, announced that he must left the show due to a problem with his leg. Nikola Knežević, who was Lena's partner in the previous episode, came back and announced he will be her new partner.

Wednesday
After every pair finished their dance, it was announced that pair with most points (Tanja P. & Marko) will get an immunity. It was also announced that there will be a special challenge. Three pairs with most points (Niggor & Jelena, Ivan & Marija and Tanja B. & Marko) were able to choose their dance duel partners (Aleksandar & Slađana, Vanesa & Vlada and Lena & Mirko), but dance duel partners were able to choose a dance (disco, rumba and samba). Niggor & Jelena chose Aleksandar & Slađana, Ivan & Marija chose Lena & Mirko and Tanja B. & Marko chose Vanesa & Vlada. Winner was chosen by judges. Winning pair gets 3 points, while losers get nothing. Aleksandar & Slađana chose disco, but Niggor & Jelena won 3 points. Lena & Mirko chose samba and won 3 points. Vanesa & Vlada chose rumba, but Tanja B. & Marko won 3 points.

Sunday
After every pair finished their dance, it was announced that there will be a team dance competition. There were two teams. Highest placed pairs from Wednesday show (Tanja P. & Marko and Niggor & Jelena) chose their team partners. Tanja P. & Marko, Tanja B. & Marko and Ivan & Marija were Team Finalists, while Niggor & Jelena, Aleksandar & Slađana and Vanesa & Vlada were Team Congratulations. Each team would be scored by judges (from 1 to 10). These points were later added to members of the team. Team Finalists won 39 points (10, 10, 9, 10), while Team Congratulations won 38 points (10, 9, 9, 10).

=== Week 8 ===
Running order

Couple	Score	Dance
Vanesa & Vlada	34 (8+8+9+9) + 4 = 38	Samba
Aleksandar & Slađana	33 (8+8+9+8) + 2 = 35	American Smooth
Tanja P. & Marko	38 (9+9+10+10) + 3 = 41	Flamenco
Tanja B. & Marko	30 (3+8+9+10) + 5 = 35	Rumba
Ivan & Marija	32 (5+9+9+9) + 1 = 33	Contemporary

== Dance chart ==
The celebrities and professional partners danced one routine for each corresponding week.

Couple	Week 1	Week 2	Week 3	Week 4	Week 5	Week 6	Week 7		Week 8
Aleksandar & Slađana	Rumba	Charleston	Pasodoble	Jive	Freestyle	Salsa	Tango	Cha-cha-cha	
Tanja B. & Marko	Tango	Waltz	Pasodoble	Jive	American Smooth	Charleston	Foxtrot	Freestyle	
Ivan & Marija	Tango	Jive	Cha-cha-cha	Rumba	Swing	Quickstep	Samba	Waltz	
Tanja P. & Marko	Viennese Waltz	Samba	Freestyle	Cha-cha-cha	Tango	Charleston	Rumba	Salsa	Flamenco
Vanesa & Vlada	American Smooth	Lindy Hop	Tango	Flamenco	Samba	Waltz	Foxtrot	Pasodoble	
Niggor & Jelena	Samba	Rumba	Jazz	Mambo	Cha-cha-cha	Jive	Freestyle	Viennese Waltz	
Lena & Nikola	Samba	American Smooth	Charleston	Contemporary	Rumba	Tango	Cha-cha-cha		
Nikolija & Ignjat	Cha-cha-cha	Jive	Contemporary	Freestyle	Viennese Waltz	Jive			
Milojko & Zorana	Salsa	Pasodoble	Waltz	Jazz	Bachata				
Milan & Jelena	Jive	Mambo	Waltz	Freestyle	—				
Nemeš & Marija	Foxtrot	Tango	Mambo	Pasodoble					
Katarina & Aleksandar	Charleston	Pasodoble	Salsa						
Tamara & Mirko	Rumba	Tango							
Saša & Ana	Pasodoble								

Highest scoring dance
Lowest scoring dance
Not performed or scored
