= Teya Dora =

Serbian singer-songwriter (born 1992)

Teya Dora Теја Дора
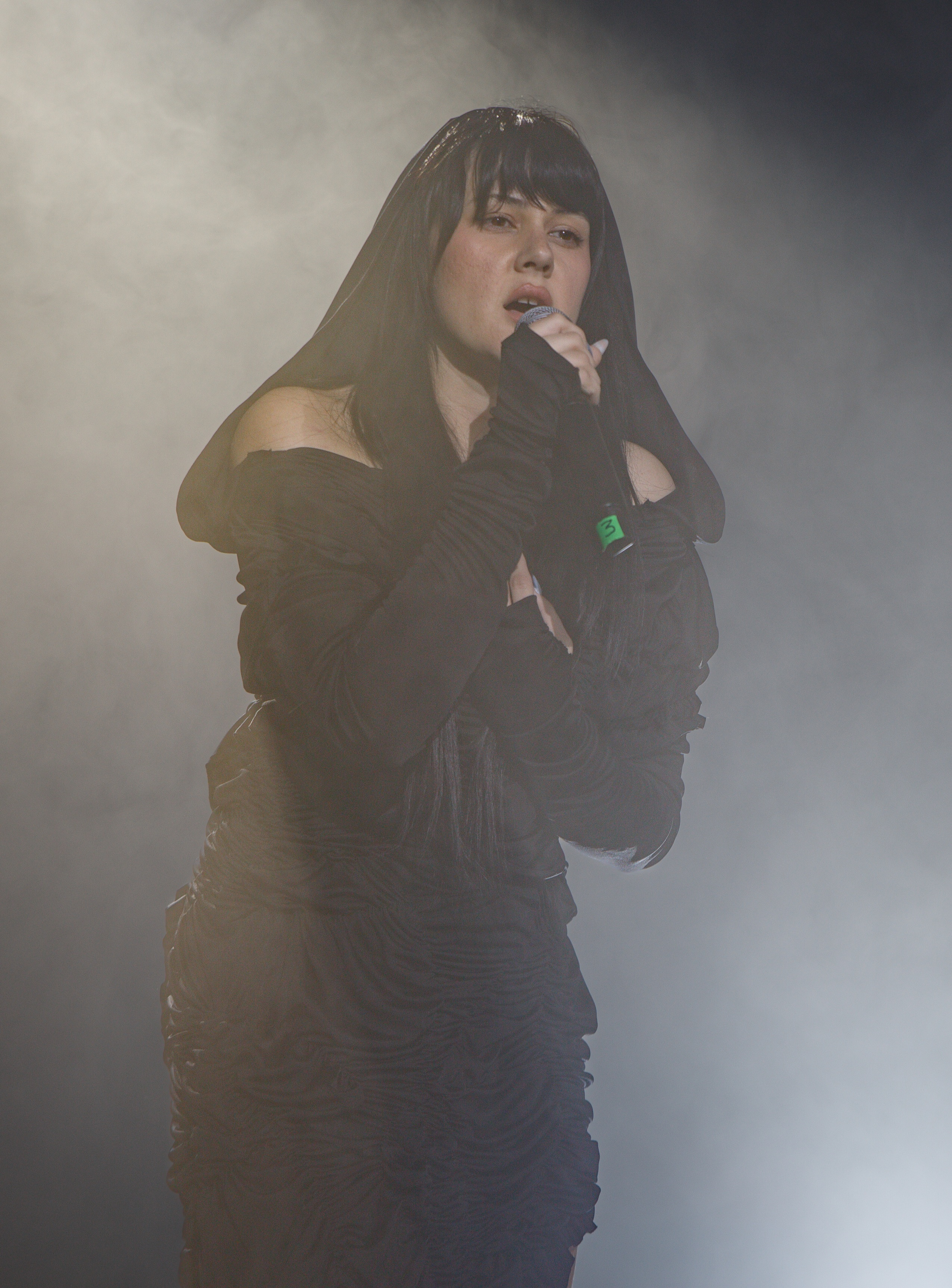
- Teya Dora performing in 2024

Background information
- Born: Teodora Pavlovska; 1 May 1992 (age 34); Bor, Serbia, FR Yugoslavia
- Genres: R&B; pop
- Occupations: Singer; songwriter; producer
- Instruments: Vocals; piano
- Years active: 2018–present
- Labels: Bassivity Digital; 3PM; Epic Records Germany

Teodora Pavlovska (Serbian Cyrillic: Теодора Павловска; born 1 May 1992), known professionally as Teya Dora (Serbian: Теја Дора / Teja Dora), is a Serbian singer, songwriter, and producer. Born in Bor, she debuted in 2018 and rose to popularity with the 2023 single "Džanum", which went internationally viral on TikTok.

She represented Serbia in the Eurovision Song Contest 2024 in Malmö, Sweden, with the song "Ramonda", finishing in 17th place.

== Early life ==
Pavlovska was born on 1 May 1992 in Bor, FR Yugoslavia. Her father was a painter and a graphic designer. Her mother is a writer and journalist with Večernje novosti, whose expertise is Vlach magic and culture. After moving to Belgrade, Pavlovska started attending music school, through which she received a scholarship to study at the Berklee College of Music in Boston, United States. At her audition, she sang "No One" by Alicia Keys. While at Berklee, she shared classes with Charlie Puth. She graduated from college in 2014, and at her graduation ceremony, she received her diploma from Jimmy Page. After graduating, Pavlovska lived in New York City, where she worked as a songwriter.

== Career ==
After returning to Serbia in 2018, Pavlovska initially began collaborating with singer Nikolija, by writing her 2018 single "Nema limita". She continued writing songs for other Serbian artists, including Nataša Bekvalac and Anastasija Ražnatović. She made her own recording debut, under the name Teya Dora, with the single "Da na meni je", released in July 2019 under Bassivity Digital. Her chosen stage name stems from the fact that while studying at Berklee, Americans didn't know how to pronounce her name; "Teya Dora" was the closest that they could get to pronouncing Teodora.

After several other singles, Teya Dora gained prominence in 2023 with the song "Džanum", recorded for the television series Južni vetar: Na granici. The song went internationally viral on TikTok, generating the internet meme "Moye moye". "Džanum" was especially used on the platform during protests following the 2023 Belgrade school shooting. The official music video for the song has accumulated over 75 million views on YouTube and over a hundred million streams on Spotify. Furthermore, the single peaked at number four on Spotify's Daily Viral Songs Global chart on 22 May, and Teya Dora became the third Serbian artist to have over a million monthly listeners on the streaming service. The other two, Konstrakta and Luke Black, achieved that during their participation in the Eurovision Song Contest. "Džanum" also entered the top ten on Billboard's Croatia Songs chart.

In December 2023, Teya Dora was announced as a contestant on Pesma za Evroviziju '24, with the song "Ramonda". After qualifying for the second semi-final, she eventually won the competition on 2 March 2024, by coming first in the jury vote and second in the televote, and thus became Serbia's entrant in the Eurovision Song Contest 2024 in Malmö, Sweden. Teya Dora qualified from the first semi-final on 7 May 2024, placing 10th out of 15, with 47 points. In the grand final on 11 May 2024, she placed 17th out of 25, with 54 points. Teya Dora also composed Mimica's entry for Dora 2024, "Koeko", but the song did not make it into the contest.

== Discography ==
=== Singles ===
Title	Year	Peak chart positions			Album
Title	Year	AUT	CRO Billb.	LTU	Album
"Da na meni je"	2019	—	*	—	Non-album singles
"Oluja"	2020	—	*	—	Non-album singles
"Ulice" (with Nikolija)	2021	—	*	—	Non-album singles
"U ilegali"	2022	—	—	—	Non-album singles
"Vozi me"	2022	—	—	—	Non-album singles
"Džanum"	2023	43	6	—	Non-album singles
"ATaMala" (with Albino)	2023	—	—	—	Non-album singles
"Ramonda"	2024	—	19	66	Non-album singles
"—" denotes a single that did not chart or was not released in that territory. " * " denotes chart did not exist at that time.

=== Guest appearances ===
List of non-single guest appearances, with other performing artists, showing year released and album name
Title	Year	Other artist(s)	Album
"Zavejan"	2022	Yungkulovski	Demoni
"Pusti me"	2022	none	Skale 2022
"U jbt"	2023	X	Svi će znati ko je Iks
"LUTALICE"	2026	Biba	MEMBERS ONLY

=== Songwriting credits ===
List of songs written or co-written for other artists, showing year released and album name
Title	Year	Artist(s)	Album	Credits
"Nema limita"	2018	Nikolija	Yin & Yang	Composer; co-lyricist
"Yin & Yang"	2019	Nikolija	Yin & Yang	Composer; lyricist; co-arranger; backing vocalist
"Dođi mami"	2019	Nataša Bekvalac	non-album singles	Co-composer
"Jasno mi je"	2020	Zoi	non-album singles	Composer
"Pazi se" (featuring Coby)	2020	Jovana Nikolić	non-album singles	Co-composer; co-lyricist; backing vocalist
"No plaky"	2020	Nikolija	non-album singles	Composer
"High Life"	2020	Nikolija	non-album singles	Co-composer; co-arranger; backing vocalist
"Sve bih"	2021	Nikolija	non-album singles	Co-composer; backing vocalist
"Gotovo"	2021	Anastasija	non-album singles	Composer; backing vocalist
"Vidim te"	2021	Meta	non-album singles	Co-lyricist; backing vocalist
"Divlja orhideja"	2021	Nikolija	non-album singles	Co-composer; backing vocalist
"Januar"	2022	Meta	non-album singles	Co-composer
"Zabranjeno"	2022	Filarri	non-album singles	Composer
"Pogana"	2022	Tam	non-album singles	Co-arranger; backing vocalist
"Dodole"	2022	Nikolija	Aurora	Composer; co-arranger
"Gucci Mama"	2022	Nikolija	Aurora	Composer
"U tami"	2023	Filarri	non-album singles	Composer
"Brani me"	2023	Anastasija	non-album singles	Composer
"Posle mene"	2023	Filarri	non-album singles	Composer
"Avlije avlije"	2023	Nikolija	non-album singles	Composer
"Neodoljivo"	2023	Aleksandra Radović	non-album singles	Composer
"Kriva"	2023	Dragana Mirković	non-album singles	Co-composer
"Koeko"	2024	Mimica	non-album singles	Composer
"Viski" (featuring Inas)	2024	Nikolija	Lavina	Composer; backing vocalist
"Namami"	2024	Nikolija	Lavina	Composer; backing vocalist
"Čuka"	2024	Teodora	Žena bez adrese	Composer
"Drugovi budale"	2025	Nikolija	Sila	Composer; co-arranger

Awards and achievements
Preceded by Luke Black with "Samo mi se spava"	Serbia in the Eurovision Song Contest; 2024	Succeeded by Princ with "Mila"
