= Džanum =

Single by Teya Dora
- Language: Serbian
- Released: March 22, 2023
- Genre: Pop; alternative pop
- Length: 2:54
- Label: Epic Records Germany
- Composers: Teodora Pavlovska; Luka Jovanović
- Lyricists: Pavlovska; Jovanović; Slobodan Veljković
- Producers: Teya Dora; Luxonee

Teya Dora singles chronology
"Vozi me" (2022)	"Džanum" (2023)	"ATaMala" (2023)

Music video
- "Džanum" on YouTube

"Džanum" (Serbian Cyrillic: Џанум; Turkish: canım; transl. My darling), is a Serbian pop song by Teya Dora. It was released as a single on March 22, 2023 by Epic Records Germany. The song spawned the internet meme "moje more".

== Background ==
The song was written by Teya Dora, Coby and Luxonee. Albino sang the backing vocals. Teya Dora pointed out that it is difficult for her to perform "Džanum" live because it reminds her of her father Dragan, whom she lost in 2021 after a serious and short illness, and for whom this was her favorite song that she composed.

== South Wind ==
"Džanum" was recorded primarily as a soundtrack for the movie South Wind: On the Border, but the sad scene in the movie which the song was supposed to accompany, was removed in post-production. The song later became the title track of the South Wind series. Coby was the one who gave the inspiration for the use of the Serbian word of Turkish origin, džanum, in the text and the first verses; he also influenced its entire creation. The movie's production team asked Teya Dora to create a modern version of a Russian traditional song for the film, but Coby suggested that a new composition should be made. Rebislav Rebić Rebi directed the official music video.

== Reception ==
Soon after its release, "Džanum" achieved great commercial success in the Balkans and later in the world, mostly thanks to the social network TikTok, where it went viral. Some listeners thought the song was good material for Eurovision Song Contest and influenced the singer to enter the Serbian national final for Eurovision 2024, Pesma za Evroviziju '24, which she won and became the Serbian representative at Eurovision.

In April, the single peaked at 6th place on the Billboard Croatia Songs chart in Croatia. In May 2023, on the list of the 200 most searched songs according to the music search engine Shazam, the song peaked at number 2 globally. On May 22, "Džanum" ranked 4th on Spotify's Global Viral Songs Chart. In June, Teya Dora also became the third Serbian artist to surpass one million monthly listeners on the aforementioned streaming service.

In the first 6 months, the song reached over 42 million listens on Spotify. It is also the background track in over 800,000 videos on Instagram and 200,000 on TikTok, later reaching more than one and a half billion views on the same platforms. It became the first song in the Serbian language to surpass one million likes on YouTube. In September 2023, Teya Dora reached 3 million listeners on Spotify, a new record for a Serbian artist. The song also received numerous radio plays on radio stations across the world; notably in Europe, Asia, South America, Canada, Australia, Africa, and the United States. The song has been covered by many artists around the world, including Indian singer Ayushmann Kurrana, Bulgarian singer Andrea, Russian singer Sami, and others. The song has over 100 million streams on Spotify.

The song was featured in numerous videos regarding the Vladislav Ribnikar Elementary School in Belgrade due to its sad melody and lyrics, but also in other viral videos with similar topics. The song went diamond in Turkey, platinum in India and gold in numerous European countries. The song has been translated into 198 languages.

The song went viral on TikTok, generating the internet meme "Moye moye".

== Charts ==
Chart performance for "Džanum"
Chart (2023)	Peak position
Austria (Ö3 Austria Top 40)	43
Croatia (Billboard)	6

== Certifications ==
Certifications for "Džanum"
Region	Certification	Certified units/sales
Hungary (MAHASZ)	Gold	2,000^{‡}
Poland (ZPAV)	Gold	25,000^{‡}
^{‡} Sales+streaming figures based on certification alone.
