= Sila (Nikolija album) =

2025 album by Nikolija

Studio album by Nikolija
- Released: 25 April 2025
- Recorded: 2024–2025
- Genre: Pop; amapiano; hip-hop
- Length: 28:10
- Label: Made In BLKN
- Producer: Eevke; 8nula8; Meta; Marko Moreno; Vekac

Nikolija chronology
Live Session (2025)	Sila (2025)

Singles from Sila
- 1. "Drugovi budale" Released: 12 March 2025

Sila (English: Force) is the fifth studio album by Serbian singer and rapper Nikolija. It was released on April 25, 2025 under Made In BLKN Records. The album was supported by its lead single "Drugovi budale", released in March. Unlike Nikolija's previous album Lavina (2024), Sila does not feature any collaborations other than on the track "Butiq" with Eevke and 8nula8, who served as the album's producers. On Sila, Nikolija was for the first time credited as a songwriter on the tracks "Inferno" and "Butiq".

== Track listing ==
Credits adapted from Spotify.

Sila
No.	Title	Writer(s)	Producer(s)	Length
1.	"Svim silama"	Ivan Obradović; Predrag Ristić; Đorđe Đorđević	Made In BLKN	2:57
2.	"Afera"	Stefan Petrović; Veličko Markićević	Vekac	2:57
3.	"Bezobrazluk"	Ognjen Jovanov	Made In BLKN	2:07
4.	"Drugovi Budale"	Andrijano Kadović; Teodora Pavlovska	Meta; Teya Dora	2:21
5.	"Berliner"	Obradović; Ristić; Đorđević	Made In BLKN	2:14
6.	"Samo mene ljubi"	Obradović; Ristić; Đorđević	Made In BLKN	2:42
7.	"Malena"	Obradović; Ristić; Đorđević	Made In BLKN	2:44
8.	"Inferno"	Marko Gajić; Ristić; Nikolija Jovanović	Marko Moreno	2:41
9.	"Siguran u zlo"	Obradović; Ristić; Đorđević	Made In BLKN	2:59
10.	"Butiq" (featuring Eevke and 8nula8)	Obradović; Ristić; Đorđević; Jovanović	Made In BLKN	2:51
11.	"Baksuz"	Gajić; Jovanov	Marko Moreno	2:11
Total length:				28:10

== Tašmajdan concert ==
The album was supposed to be supported with Nikolija's first major headline solo concert, titled Sila Je u Nama (English: The Force Is Within Us). The live show was initially announced at the Tašmajdan Stadium in Belgrade for 29 August 2025. However, on August 19, the concert was cancelled by its organizers, Sky Events. The cited reason was the installation of the grass pitch at the venue, which caused technical difficulties for realization, thus both Nikolija's and a subsequent concert by singer Adil Maksutović got cancelled. Nova.rs also speculated that the concert's cancelation might have bee caused because of Nikolija's support for the 2024–2025 Serbian anti-corruption protests, noting that other musicians who publicly backed the protesters faced an increasing number of show cancellations.

== Charts ==
Chart performance for Sila
Chart (2025)	Peak position
Austrian Albums (Ö3 Austria)	64
