= Alice Winocour =

French screenwriter and director (born 1976)

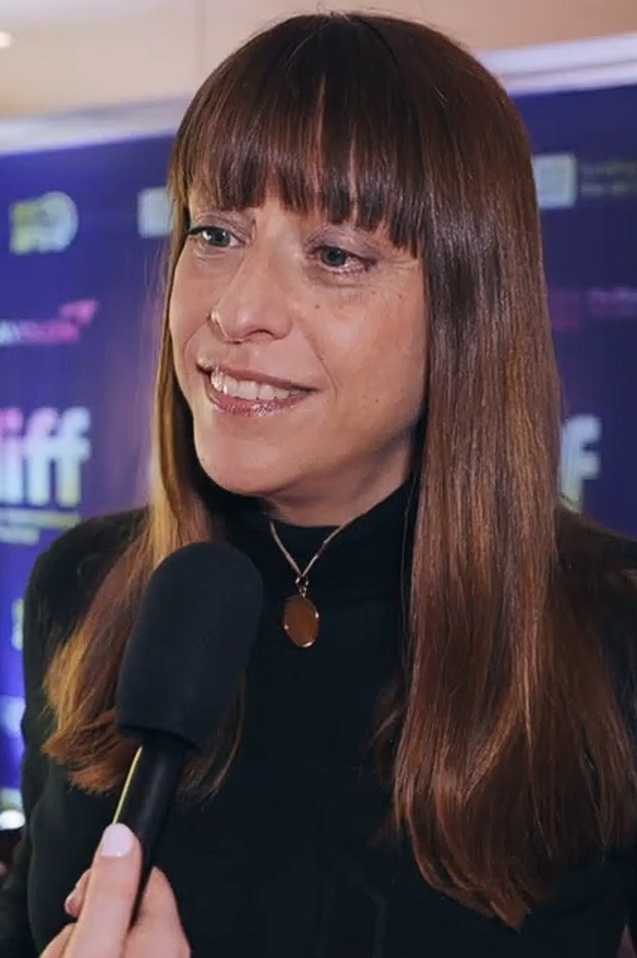
- Winocour in 2026
- Born: 13 January 1976 (age 50); Paris, France
- Occupations: Film director, screenwriter
- Years active: 2003–present

Alice Winocour (born 13 January 1976) is a French screenwriter and director.

== Life and career ==
Winocour was born in Paris, France, to a Jewish family. After studying screenwriting at La Fémis, Winocour made three short films and wrote the script for Vladimir Perisic's film Ordinary People (released in 2009).

Winocour's first feature film, Augustine, based on the relationship between French neurologist Jean-Martin Charcot and his patient Louise Augustine Gleizes, was presented at the Cannes Film Festival in 2012 as part of the Critics' Week. Her second directorial film Maryland was selected to be screened in the Un Certain Regard section at the 2015 Cannes Film Festival.

Winocour also co-wrote the film Mustang with Deniz Gamze Ergüven. It was screened in the Directors' Fortnight section at the 2015 Cannes Film Festival. The film was selected as the French entry for the Best Foreign Language Film at the 88th Academy Awards.

She was named as a member of the jury of the Critics' Week section of the 2016 Cannes Film Festival.

Her 2019 film Proxima premiered at the 2019 Toronto International Film Festival, where it received an honourable mention from the Platform Prize jury.

== Filmography ==
Short film

Year	Title	Director	Writer	Notes
2003	Orphée		Yes	Also as actress
2005	Kitchen	Yes	Yes	
2007	Magic Paris	Yes	Yes	
2009	Pina Colada	Yes	Yes	

Feature film

Year	Title	Director	Writer	Notes
2008	Home		Yes	Collaboration
2009	Ordinary People		Yes	Collaboration
2012	Augustine	Yes	Yes	
2015	Disorder	Yes	Yes	
2015	Mustang		Yes	
2019	Proxima	Yes	Yes	
2022	Paris Memories (Revoir Paris)	Yes	Yes	
2025	Couture	Yes	Yes	

== Awards and nominations ==
Year	Title	Award/Nomination
2005	Kitchen	Nominated—2005 Cannes Film Festival - Short Film Palme d'Or
2007	Magic Paris	Cabourg Film Festival - Best Short Film Director; Los Angeles Film Festival - Best Narrative Short
2012	Augustine	Nominated—2012 Cannes Film Festival - Caméra d'Or; Nominated—César Award for Best First Feature Film; Nominated—Stockholm International Film Festival - Bronze Horse for Best Film
2015	Disorder	Nominated—2015 Cannes Film Festival - Prix Un certain regard
2015	Mustang	César Award for Best Original Screenplay; Nominated—Lumière Award for Best Screenplay
