= Deniz Gamze Ergüven =

Turkish-French film director

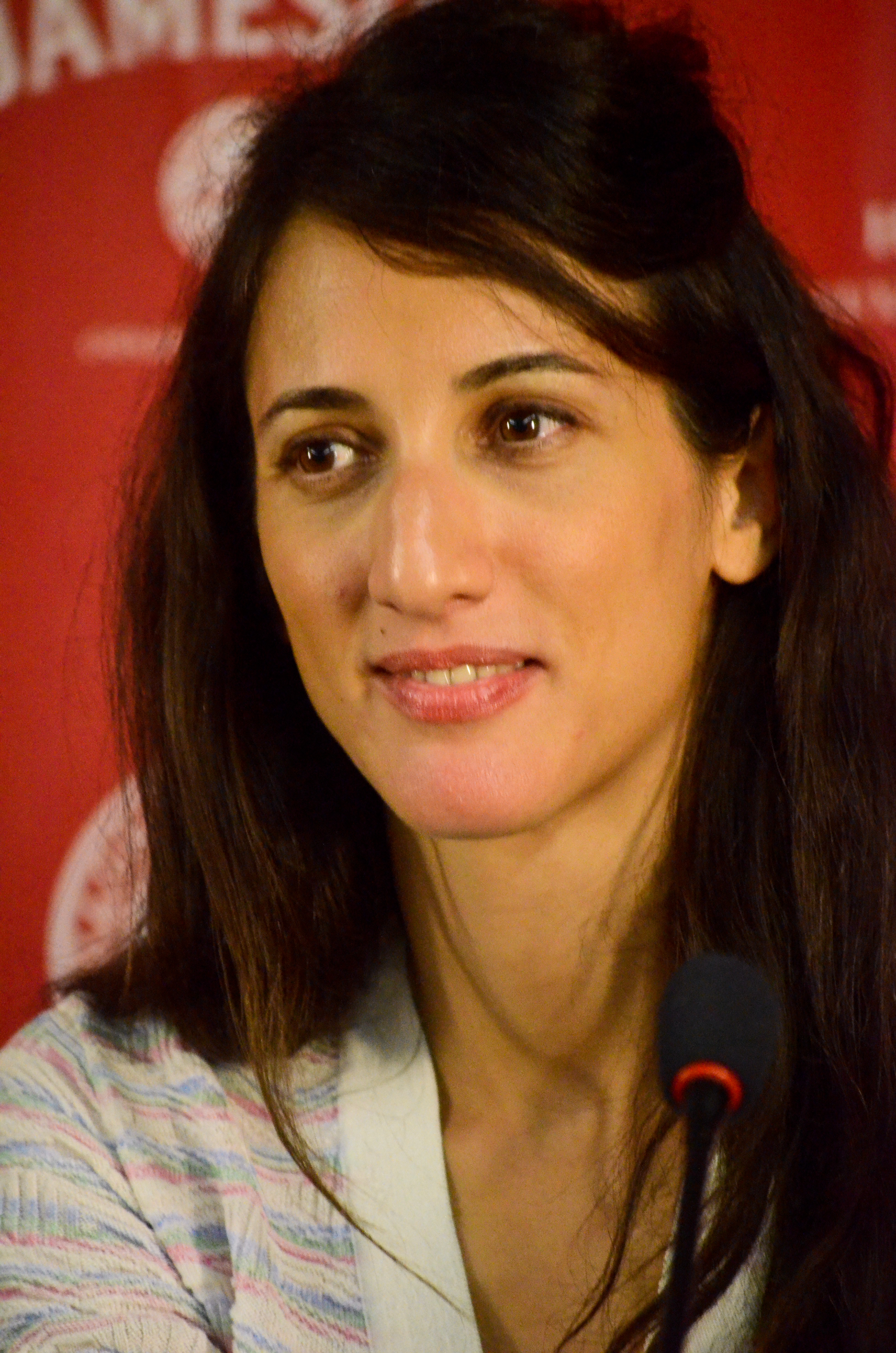
- Ergüven in July 2015
- Born: 4 June 1978 (age 48); Ankara, Turkey
- Education: La Fémis
- Occupation: Filmmaker
- Years active: 2006–present
- Children: 1

Deniz Gamze Ergüven (born 4 June 1978) is a Turkish-French film director best known for her debut feature film Mustang.

== Early life and education ==
Ergüven was born in Ankara, Turkey but moved to France in the 1980s. She grew up and went to school in France. She attended La Fémis and graduated in 2008.

== Career ==
In 2011 Ergüven was invited to attend the Cannes Film Festivals Atelier to help develop her project, The Kings. While there she met fellow director Alice Winocour who was there to develop her first feature film Augustine. After Ergüven was unable to find financing for her film, Winocour suggested she write a more intimate piece leading the two to begin work on the script for Mustang.

Her debut feature Mustang premiered in the Directors' Fortnight section at the 2015 Cannes Film Festival where it won the Europa Cinemas Label Award. It later played in the Special Presentations section of the 2015 Toronto International Film Festival. The film was nominated for Best Foreign Language Film at the 88th Academy Awards (after having been submitted by France).

Ergüven was also nominated for multiple César Awards, winning the César Award for Best First Feature Film as well as the César Award for Best Original Screenplay.

Ergüven was surprised by the film's overwhelmingly positive welcome. "During Cannes I was telling this joke: Tuesday we’ll show the movie, Wednesday we’ll talk to the press, Thursday we’ll be old news. But that Thursday never came! We’re still Wednesday and it’s just getting more intense", she said.

In May 2016, Ergüven announced her next feature film Kings, which would star Halle Berry in a lead role and be set during the 1992 Los Angeles riots. The film had its world premiere at the 2017 Toronto International Film Festival on 13 September 2017.

In June 2016, Ergüven was invited to join the Academy of Motion Picture Arts and Sciences (directors' branch).

== Personal life ==
Ergüven was pregnant while filming Mustang and gave birth to her son on 11 February 2015.

== Filmography ==
Short film

Year	Title	Director	Writer	Notes
2006	Mon trajet préféré	Yes	Yes	
2006	A Drop of Water	Yes	Yes	Also actress; Turkish: Bir damla su; French: Une goutte d'eau

Film

Year	Title	Director	Writer
2015	Mustang	Yes	Yes
2017	Kings	Yes	Yes

TV series

Year	Title	Notes
2018	The First	2 episodes
2019	The Handmaid's Tale	2 episodes
2020	Perry Mason	3 episodes
2023	The Last Thing He Told Me	2 episodes
