= Lavina (album) =

2024 album by Nikolija

Studio album by Nikolija
- Released: 15 March 2024
- Recorded: 2023–2024
- Genre: Pop; trap; house-pop
- Length: 29:06
- Label: Made In BLKN
- Producer: Ivan Obradović Eevke; Đorđe Đorđević 8Nula8; Jan Magdevski; Predrag Ristić META; Marko Moreno; Aleksandar Sablić

Nikolija chronology
Aurora (2022)	Lavina (2024)	Sila (2025)

Lavina (transl. Avalanche) is the fourth studio album by Serbian recording artist Nikolija. It was released digitally through Made In BLKN Records on 15 March 2024. The album features guest appearances from Devito, Amna, INAS, THCF, Eevke and 8Nula8. The production on Lavina was mainly handled by Ivan Obradović - Eevke, Đorđe Đorđević - 8Nula8 and Predrag Ristić - META from the Made In BLKN collective, as well as by Jan Magedvski, Marko Moreno and Aleksandar Sablić.

== Background ==
Nikolija's previous studio album, Aurora, was released during 2022. Following the release of the single "Ljubi jako" in July 2023, she hinted her fourth album in September, with tracks that were initially supposed to be influenced by "Ljubi jako". However, she later stated that her forthcoming album would include rap music as well The album's official cover art, track listing and release date were revealed in February 2024, after her partner, Relja Popović, had accidentally leaked the pre-save link.

== Commercial performance ==
Lavina saw overall commercial success. The album accumulated over two million streams on Spotify during its first week of release. Moreover, upon the release of Lavina, "Nenormalan lik", "Viski" and "Testo" were the top three trending music videos on YouTube in Serbia. During the week of March 30, "Nenormalan lik", "Viski", "Testo" and "Emotivno" also simultaneously peaked on the Billboard Croatia Songs chart, whilst "Nenormalan lik" took the highest position, peaking at number three. Lavina charted in Austria and Switzerland, peaking at number 18 and 38, respectively.

== Track listing ==
Credits adapted from Spotify.

Lavina
No.	Title	Writer(s)	Producer(s)	Length
1.	"Lavina"	Stefan Petrović; Veličko Markićević	Vekac	2:47
2.	"Emotivno"	Vuksan Bilanović; Marko Moreno	Marko Moreno; Aleksandar Sablić	2:21
3.	"Viski" (feat. INAS)	Inas Arnautović; Teodora Pavlovska; Andrijano Kadović	Predrag Ristić META	2:23
4.	"Nenormalan Lik" (feat. Devito)	Bilanović; Moreno	Moreno; Sablić	2:15
5.	"Kada Se Ljube Bivši"	Đorđe Đorđević; Ivan Obradović	Made In BLKN	2:52
6.	"Testo" (feat. Amna)	Amna Alajbegović; Đorđević; Obradović	Made In BLKN	2:59
7.	"Milo Moje" (feat. THCF)	Borko Vujučić; Stefan Gligorijević; Đorđević	Made In BLKN	2:18
8.	"Namami"	Pavlovska; Ognjen Jovanov	META	2:10
9.	"Džungla" (feat. Eevke and 8Nula8)	Đorđević; Obradović	Made In BLKN	2:59
10.	"Barbie"	Đorđević; Obradović	Made In BLKN	2:42
11.	"Pravo Na Grešku"	Andrijano Kadović; Stjepan Jelica	3PM	3:16
Total length:				29:06

== Personnel ==
- Nikolija Jovanović - lead vocals (all tracks)
- Lejla Hot - background vocals (2, 11)
- Teodora Pavlovska - background vocals (3, 8)
- Jan Magdevski - mastering and mixing (1, 3, 4, 8, 11)
- Marko Moreno - mastering and mixing (2)
- Kristina Simić - photography

== Charts ==
Chart performance for Lavina
Chart (2024)	Peak position
Austrian Albums (Ö3 Austria)	18
Swiss Albums (Schweizer Hitparade)	38

== Release history ==
List of regions, release dates, showing formats and label
Country	Date	Format	Label
Various	March 15, 2024	digital download; streaming	Made In BLKN
