= Moye moye =

Internet meme

"Moye moye" is an internet meme that originated from the 2023 Serbian song "Džanum" by singer-songwriter Teya Dora. The song's chorus contains the lyrics "moje more" in Serbian which means "my nightmares". (Note: More means "sea" in Serbian. However, in this context, more is the plural form of the word mora which translates as "a nightmare" or "an incubus".)

== Origin ==
"Moye Moye" originated from the 2023 song "Džanum" by Serbian singer Teya Dora. In the song's chorus, Dora sings the lyrics "moje more" which means "my nightmares" in Serbian. In mid 2023, TikTok users began uploading videos using the chorus as backing music, mishearing the lyrics as "moye moye." This sparked a viral meme trend on social platforms where users created short lip-sync and dance videos using the upbeat audio.

== Spread and usage in internet culture ==
The "Moye Moye" meme spread rapidly beyond TikTok to other platforms such as Instagram, Facebook, and YouTube and across many countries, especially in South Asian countries such as Bangladesh and India. Across social media, versions of the meme have amassed hundreds of millions of views. Several factors contributed to the viral popularity, including the energetic mood, repetitive lyrics, and shareable dance moves. The original "Džanum" music video has over 94 million views as of September 2024.

While the original song has somber lyrics about despair, the meme is used in more lighthearted ways. Common themes in videos include injecting humor through irony or unexpected twists. It is also popularly used to express sadness in a comedic way, like someone realizing another person is missing a body part. The simplicity of the lyrics allows virtually anyone to recreate the meme.

== Reception ==
Many celebrities helped popularize the meme by creating their own interpretations. This includes Indian actor Ayushmann Khurrana singing his own cover of the song and police departments in Delhi and West Bengal using it in awareness campaign videos about traffic safety. Serbian singer Teya Dora has expressed appreciation at her song's global reach as a viral meme.

In January 2024, BBC Bangla included the meme in its year meme recap of 2023.

=== Criticism ===
Critics have argued that the "Moye Moye" meme trend perpetuates negative disability stereotypes and offensive humor through its repetitive formula of people dancing to mock those with disabilities.
