= Ples sa zvezdama =

- Genre: Interactive dance competition, celebrity format
- Based on: Strictly Come Dancing
- Presented by: Aleksa Jelić; Irina Radović
- Judges: Nikola Mandić; Marija Prelević; Aleksandar Josipović; Konstantin Kostjukov
- Country of origin: Serbia
- Original language: Serbian
- No. of seasons: 1
- No. of episodes: 12

Production
- Running time: 180 minutes (with commercials)

Original release
- Network: Prva
- Release: March 29, 2014

Ples sa Zvezdama is a Serbian dance competition show scheduled to air in March 2014. It is a Serbian version of Dancing with the Stars. The show was announced by Prva on January 30, 2014.

The contestant pairs consist of a celebrity paired with a professional dancer. Past celebrity contestants include professional and Olympic athletes, supermodels, actors and singers. Each couple performs predetermined dances and competes against the others for judges' points and audience votes. The couple receiving the lowest combined total of judges' points and audience votes is eliminated each week until only the champion dance pair remains.

There are fourteen contestants in the first season. Season one judges will be Nikola Mandić, Marija Prelević, Aleksandar Josipović, and Konstantin Kostjukov.

== Series ==
Series	No. of stars	No. of weeks	Duration dates	Partners in the finals		
Series	No. of stars	No. of weeks	Duration dates	First place	Second place	Third place
One	14	12	March 29, 2014 - June 16, 2014	Ivan Mihailović; Marija Martinović	Tanja Bošković; Marko Mićić	Tanja Petrović; Marko Vasiljević
