= Vladimir Perišić (film director) =

Serbian film director (born 1976)

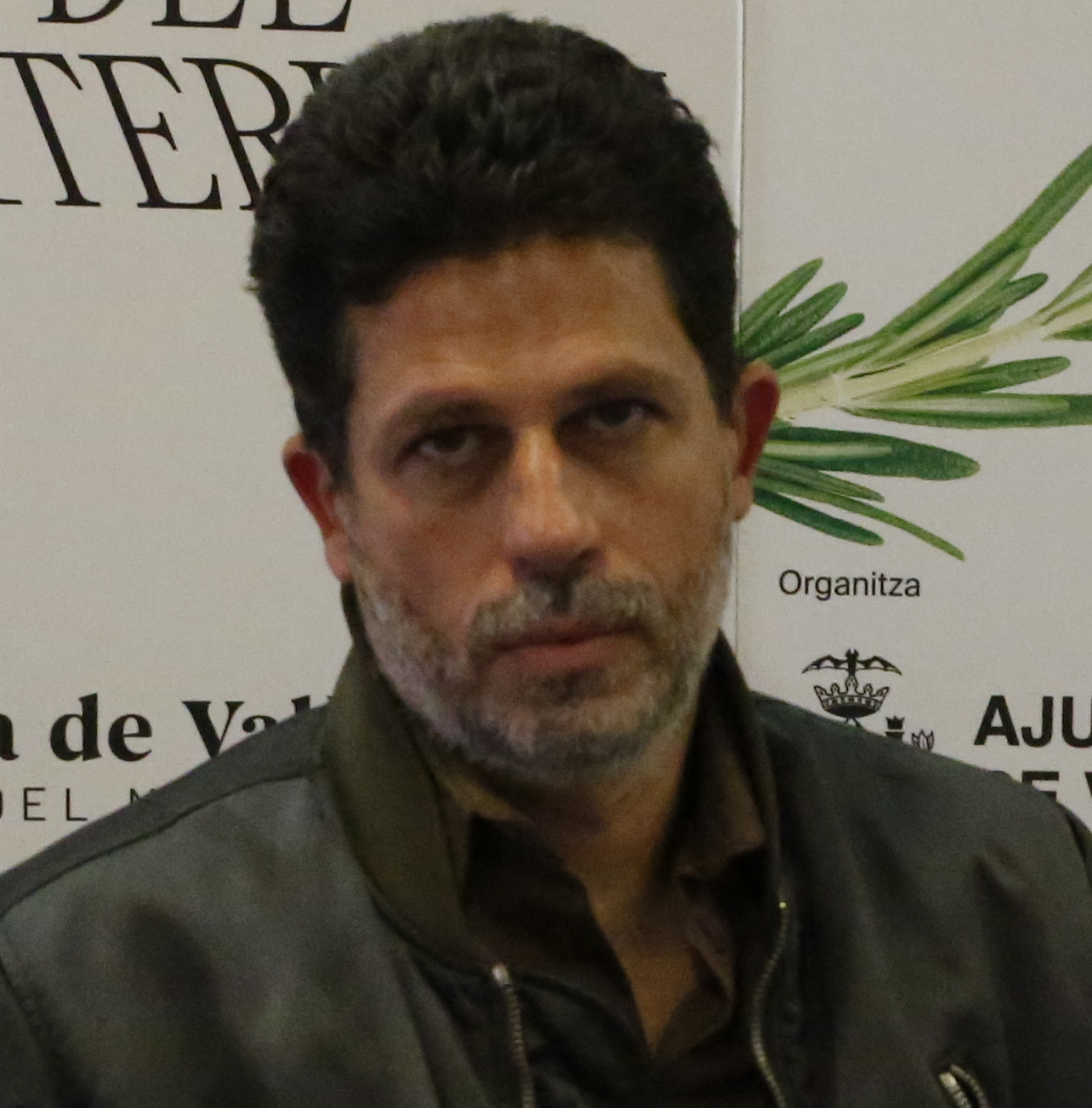
- Vladimir Perišić visiting the Mostra de València in 2023
- Born: 1976 (age 49–50)
- Occupation: Film maker

Notes
- (voice)

Vladimir Perišić (born 1976 in Belgrade) is a Serbian film director.

== Biography ==
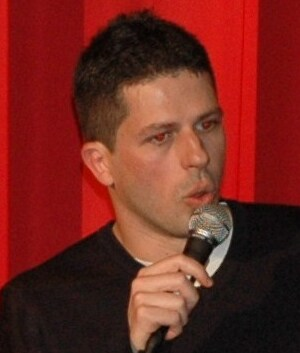
Perišić in 2010

From 1995 to 97 he studied film directing at the Faculty of Dramatic Arts, Belgrade, from 1997–99 Modern Literature at the University of Paris. He stayed in Paris and studied film from 1999 to 2003 at La Fémis (École Nationale Supérieure des Métiers de l'Image et du Son).

His 31 min. graduation film Dremano oko (2003) was selected for Cinefoundation at the Cannes Festival. Ordinary People (2009), co-written by Alice Winocour, was his acclaimed existentialist feature film debut about seven soldiers posted to an abandoned farm with little information except to shoot a couple of people they have never met. It won Best Film at the 2009 Sarajevo Film Festival (Relja Popović won the Best Actor award) and the Cineuropa Prize for Best European film in the Miami International Film Festival in 2010.

== Filmography ==
- 1996 Novembre
- 2002 Killhouse
- 2003 Dremano oko
- 2009 Ordinary People
- 2014 Bridges of Sarajevo
