= Hotel Jugoslavija (album) =

Studio album by Relja Popović
- Released: May 30, 2025
- Genre: Hip-hop; pop
- Length: 27:56
- Label: Made In BLKN
- Producer: Relja; Eevke; 8nula8; META; Đorđe; Venok; Vekac; Marko Moreno; Ryan Alexy

Relja Popović chronology
Stroberi (2024)	Hotel Jugoslavija (2025)	Beograđanka (2026)

Hotel Jugoslavija is the debut studio album by Serbian rapper Relja Popović. It was released on May 30, 2025, under Relja's own label Made In BLKN. The tracks on Hotel Jugoslavija were primarily co-written by Relja, Ivan Obradović Eevke and Đorđe Đorđević 8nula8. They also co-produced the album alongside Predrag Risić META. The album additionally features guest appearances from Eevke and 8nula8, as well as from Relja's partner Nikolija and rapper Đorđe.

== Background and release ==
Hotel Jugoslavija followed the release of Relja's 2024 EP Stroberi. The album was not preceded by any singles, but tracks "Sex Mashina" and "Baš Ti Se Sviđa" were accompanied by music videos. Hotel Jugoslavija can also be considered as Relja's second solo album, taking into account that the songs from his unofficial debut album, titled Made In BLKN, were released between 2019 and 2021 exclusively as standalone singles and never together on one record.

The album title derived from Belgrade's historic Hotel Jugoslavija that was demolished in January 2025. According to Relja, the building is supposed to symbolise impermanency, which is the album's overarching motif. He conceived the album as a record that examines his own "dilemmas, fears and traumas related to the past". The album's cover art features a close shot of Relja with a light blue-dyed buzz cut while rubbing his undereye, seemingly reminiscing Frank Ocean's Blonde (2016).

== Reception ==
Upon its release, Hotel Jugoslavija charted in Austria and Switzerland. In addition, three tracks from the album - "Baš Ti Se Sviđa" featuring Nikolija, "Sex Mashina" and "Limiti", simultaneously debuted on Billboard's Croatia Songs chart. Relja's duet with Nikolija, nonetheless, reached the highest position out of the three tracks, by peaking at number three.

The song "Baš Ti Se Sviđa" attracted significant media attention for its music video, which received very polarizing public perception and was described as highly graphic and erotic. In December 2025, an article by Vogue Adria listed Hotel Jugoslavija amongst the "best regional albums of 2025". Furthermore, the article also described Relja's and Nikolija's music video for "Baš Ti Se Sviđa" as that year's "most controversial moment in Balkan pop culture".

== Track listing ==
Credits adapted from Spotify.

Hotel Jugoslavija
No.	Title	Writer(s)	Producer(s)	Length
1.	"Dobri Umiru Maldi"	Relja Popović; Ivan Obradović; Đorđe Đorđević	Relja; Eevke; 8nula8; META	2:23
2.	"Zverka" (featuring Eevke and 8nula8)	Popović; Obradović; Đorđević	Relja; Eevke; 8nula8; META	3:15
3.	"Limiti"	Popović; Obradović; Đorđević	Relja; Eevke; 8nula8; META	2:34
4.	"Baš Ti Se Sviđa" (featuring Nikolija)	Popović; Obradović; Đorđević	Relja; Eevke; 8nula8; META	3:07
5.	"Prvi Kraj"	Popović; Obradović; Đorđević; Stefan Petrović; Veličko Markićević	Relja; Eevke; 8nula8; META; Venok; Vekac; Đorđe	3:17
6.	"Hektar"	Popović; Obradović; Đorđević	Relja; Eevke; 8nula8; META	2:07
7.	"Slatka So"	Popović; Obradović; Đorđević	Relja; Eevke; 8nula8; META	2:25
8.	"Sex Mashina"	Popović; Đorđević; Marko Gajić	Relja; Eevke; 8nula8; META; Marko Moreno	2:24
9.	"Zvecka Oružje" (featuring Đorđe)	Popović; Obradović; Đorđević; Đorđe Čarkić	Relja; Eevke; 8nula8; META; Đorđe	3:20
10.	"Gde Je Bog"	Popović; Đorđević; Marko Gajić; Predrag Ristić	Relja; Eevke; 8nula8; META; Ryan Alexy	3:00
Total length:				27:56

== Charts ==
Chart performance for Hotel Jugoslavija
Chart (2025)	Peak position
Austrian Albums (Ö3 Austria)	13
Swiss Albums (Schweizer Hitparade)	48
