= Louise Augustine Gleizes =

19th-century French woman

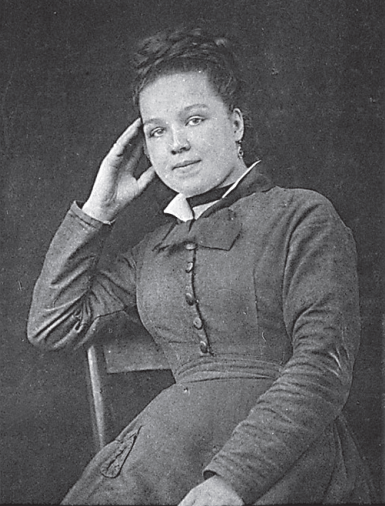
A photo of "Augustine" by Albert Londe from Iconographie Photographique

Louise Augustine Gleizes (born 21 August 1861), known as Augustine or A, was a French woman who was publicly exhibited as a "hysteria" patient by neurologist Jean-Martin Charcot while she was held at the Salpêtrière Hospital in Paris.

== Life ==
Louise Augustine Gleizes had worked as a kitchen maid, and was sent to the Salpêtrière Hospital at age 14 on 21 October 1875. Before this, she had been in a nurse's care in early life, and after, she was a nurse in a religious boarding school where she suffered corporal punishment. She was molested when she was 10 years old and raped by her mother’s lover when she was 13.

While she was a patient of the Salpêtrière Hospital, Charcot, who treated her, would hypnotize her so she would demonstrate her supposed hysteria. Sigmund Freud and Edgar Degas, among others, came to see this. Photographs were taken of her then, which became known as the most infamous visual representations of women's experiences of hysteria. Hysteria included expressions of uncontrolled emotions, interpersonal manipulations, sexual assertiveness, and seizures, including postures of a physiological contortion. The photographic images of Gleizes as evidence toward Charcot's case conceptualization, the 'truth' of hysteria in women, and the performative gestures of psychological suffering thus solidified the women's experiences of distress and continue to influence diagnoses.

Current discourse organizes Gleizes symptoms in light of the sexual abuse and other violence she experienced as a younger girl. In light of this victimization, the nature of her "performance" as a patient becomes questionable when judged by ethical standards of practice. Of further ethical note, when Gleizes no longer agreed to be photographed, she was admitted to solitary confinement in the Hospital. In 1880, she escaped the hospital, disguised in men's clothes. After that she was never seen again. Charcot's work with her made him more famous, and he remains best remembered for it.

== In popular culture ==
Jean-Luc Godard compares the figure of Lillian Gish in the film Way Down East to Gleizes (referred to as "Augustine at Salpetrière") in his documentary series Histoire(s) du cinéma.

Winona Ryder appears to mimic Gleizes film stills in the 1992 adaptation of Bram Stoker's Dracula as she begins to experience early states of vampirism.

A 2012 French historical drama film, Augustine, is about a love affair between Charcot and Gleizes. In reality, there was no sexual relationship between her and Charcot, although questions have been raised about the ethics of her treatment and the overt sexualization that Charcot and other staff demanded of her, and her poor treatment when she refused to continue the performance.

The play Photographs of A by Daniel Keene, about her, was performed in 2014 at Melbourne Theatre Company’s NEON Festival.

The 2021 French film The Mad Women's Ball, based on the novel by Victoria Mas, which is set in the La Pitié-Salpêtrière neurological clinic, features her as one of Charcot's patients on whom he demonstrates hypnosis.

Gleize is also one of the central inspirations for the 2024 historical novel The Madwomen of Paris by Jennifer Cody Epstein.
