= Opasna igra (song) =

Single by Nikolija

from the album №1
- Released: 4 June 2015
- Recorded: May–June 2015
- Genre: Pop-folk
- Length: 3:10
- Label: IDJTunes
- Songwriters: Đorđe Đorđević; Relja Popović; Ivan Obradović; Senad Bislimi
- Producer: Atelje Trag

Nikolija singles chronology
"Premija" (2014)	"Opasna igra" (2015)	"Ljubavni maneken" (2015)

Music video
- "OPASNA IGRA (OFFICIAL VIDEO)" on YouTube

Opasna igra (English: Dangerous Game) is a single by Serbian singer Nikolija. Released on 4 June 2015 under IDJTunes, it was later included to Nikolija's 2016 debut album №1. The lyrics were written by her partner Relja Popović and Đorđe Đorđević, while the music was created by Ivan Obradović and Senad Bislimi from Atelje Impuls. "Opasna igra" was produced by Nikolija's frequent collaborators Marko Peruničić and Nebojša Arežina from Atelje Trag. Musically, it was described as pop-folk with contemporary R&B influences.

== Music video ==
"Opasna igra" was released alongside accompanying music video, which was directed by Andrej Ilić from IDJVideos and Greek filmmaker Pedram Voss. It was shot on a beach in Athens, Greece during May 2015, as well as in Belgrade. The video was edited and produced by Đorđe Trbović and Boris Zec and released under IDJVideos.

The concept behind it was to showcase Nikolija's lifestyle during her university years in Athens.

At the end of the year "Opasna igra" was declared the most viewed Serbian video of 2015. The music video has collected over 48 million views, as of December 2022.

== Credits and personnel ==
Credits adapted from the liner notes of №1.

- Nikolija – vocals
- Relja Popović – lyrics
- Đorđe Đorđević – lyrics
- Atelje Impuls – music
- Atelje Trag – arrangement
- Ksenija Milošević – backing vocals
- Eljez Šabani – clarinet and saxophone

== Release history ==
Country	Date	Format	Label	Ref
Various	4 June 2015	digital download, streaming	IDJTunes	
