= Ćao zdravo =

"Ćao, zdravo"

Single by Nikolija featuring Teča Gambino

from the album №1
- Released: 9 April 2013
- Recorded: 2013
- Genre: Electropop
- Length: 4:04
- Label: IDJTunes
- Songwriters: Atelje Trag; S. Pešić
- Producer: Atelje Trag

Nikolija singles chronology
"Ćao, zdravo" (2013)	"Nikolija" (2013)

Teča singles chronology
"Ferrari" (2013)	"Ćao, zdravo" (2013)	"Muške priče" (2015)

Ćao, zdravo (English: Bye, Hello) is the debut single by Serbian recording artist Nikolija. It was released on 9 April 2013 under IDJTunes. "Ćao,zdravo" features guest vocals from rapper Teror Teča, who also wrote the lyrics. The music and production was handled by Marko Peruničić and Nebojša Arežina from Atelje Trag. "Ćao, zdravo" is also featured on Nikolija's debut album №1 (2016).

== Background ==
After graduating from college in Athens, Greece in 2013, Nikolija moved back to Belgrade. There, her friend and singer Milan Stanković introduced her to Marko Peruničić and Nebojša Arežina from Atelje Trag, who would become her frequent collaborators. According to Nikolija, "Ćao, zdravo" draws inspiration from the 2012 Wisin & Yandel's single "Follow the Leader" featuring Jennifer Lopez.

The song was released alongside a music video, which was directed by Andrej Ilić and produced by Đorđe Trbović and Boris Zec from IDJVideos. It features S&M aesthetics, because of which the song initially received polarizing public reception. The music video also received comparison to the later released "Work bitch" by Britney Spears. In an interview with a Serbian Britney Spears fan forum, Britney.rs, Nikolija stated:

"You have to keep in mind that today is 2013 and it is too hard to be 100% original. Many ideas artists use, then recycle and add something different on them. In any case, I'd be ungrateful to say that I'm not flattered because my music video 'Ćao zdravo' maybe has been noticed by world famous names such as Britney Spears and Ben Mor."

== Credits and personnel ==
Credits adapted from the liner notes of №1.

- Nikolija – vocals
- S. Pešić (aka Teror Techa) – lyrics
- Atelje Trag – music and arrangement
- Ivana Peters – backing vocals

== Release history ==
Country	Date	Format	Label	Ref
Various	9 April 2013	Digital download, streaming	IDJTunes	
