= Yin & Yang (album) =

Studio album by Nikolija
- Released: April 25, 2019
- Recorded: 2017–19
- Studio: Studio O, Belgrade
- Genre: EDM trap; pop; reggaeton; house
- Length: 30:15
- Label: IDJTunes
- Producer: Coby; Luxonee; Marko Moreno; Teodora Pavlovska; Atelje Trag; Milan Radulović

Nikolija chronology
№1 (2016)	Yin & Yang (2019)	Aurora (2022)

Singles from Yin & Yang
- 1. "Loš momak" Released: July 21, 2017; 2. "Nema limita" Released: May 14, 2018; 3. "Slažem" Released: August 15, 2018; 4. "Yin & Yang" Released: March 29, 2019; 5. "Nije lako biti ja" Released: April 13, 2019

Yin & Yang is the second studio album by Serbian recording artist Nikolija. It was released on digital platforms on 25 April 2019, through IDJTunes. The album was supported by two singles: "Yin & Yang" and "Nije lako biti ja", featuring Serbian rapper Fox. Standalone singles: "Loš momak" (2017), "Nema limita" and "Slažem" (2018) were also included to the album as bonus tracks.

== Background and release ==
Nikolija announced the release of her second album in March 2019, when she also teased a collaboration with a male rapper. The album's lead and title track, "Yin & Yang", was subsequently released on 29 March. It was followed by the album's second single, "Nije lako biti ja", featuring Fox, on April 13. Music videos for other five songs from Yin & Yang were released on 24 April 2019. The album itself was officially released on streaming services the following day. On May 7, the album was also made available on compact disc in a limited series of 700 copies. The physical edition also includes previously released singles: "Loš momak" (2017), "Nema limita" and "Slažem" (2018), as bonus tracks.

In an interview with Prva TV, Nikolija stated that the album was initially supposed to be a concept album, but eventually ended as "experimental" with tracks in different hip hop-oriented genres, which she correlated to the philosophy of yin and yang.

All the songs to a certain extent describe me, my personality, carry my energy and, not to be pretentious, but describe a music direction called "Nikolija"

— Nikolija describing the album,

Following the album's official promotional performance at the Feestyler nightclub in Belgrade on 9 May, Nikolija also performed the songs from Yin & Yang at the Ulaz festival in May.

== Track listing ==
Yin & Yang – Standard (digital) edition
No.	Title	Writer(s)	Producer(s)	Length
1.	"Yin & Yang"	Teodora Pavlovska	ARKTK; Pavlovska	03:25
2.	"Nije lako biti ja" (feat. Fox)	Branko Kljajić - Fox; Slobodan Veljković Coby	Luxonee; Coby	02:54
3.	"Što mi radi to"	Dragutin Gvozdenović; Veljković	Luxonee; Coby	03:08
4.	"Dama bez pardona"	Marko Milivojev - Mili; Veljković	Coby	02:39
5.	"Ove noći"	Nikola Kirćanski - Kei; Milan Mladenović	Luxonee; Coby	02:50
6.	"Harizma"	Vuksan Bilanović; Marko Gajić	Marko Moreno	02:58
7.	"Tigar"	TheOutsiders; Milan Radulović	Milan Novaković; Moreno	02:21
Total length:				20:15

Yin & Yang – CD bonus tracks
No.	Title	Writer(s)	Producer(s)	Length
8.	"Loš momak"	Petar Lugonja -Rolex; Veljković	Luxonee; Coby	03:27
9.	"Slažem"	Gvozdenović; Veljković; Relja Popović	Luxonee; Coby	03:25
10.	"Nema limita"	Pavlovska; Đorđe Đorđević	Atelje Trag	03:30
Total length:				30:39

== Personnel ==
Musicians

- Nikolija Jovanović - main vocals
- Teodora Pavlovska - background vocals (1)
- Bojana Vunturišević - background vocals (2)
- Suzana Dinić - background vocals (6)
- Ksenija Milošević - background vocals (7)

Technical

- Jan Magdevski JanZoo - mixing and mastering
- Lex Barkey - mastering (9)

== Release history ==
List of regions, release dates, showing formats and label
Country	Date	Format	Label
Various	April 25, 2019	Digital download; streaming	IDJTunes
Serbia	May 7, 2019	CD	IDJTunes
