= Nikolija (singer) =

Serbian singer (born 1989)

- Николија
- Born: Nikolija Jovanović; 19 October 1989 (age 37); Zagreb, SR Croatia, SFR Yugoslavia
- Occupations: Singer; rapper
- Years active: 2013–present
- Spouse: Relja Popović (m. 2026)
- Partner: Thanasis Antetokounmpo (2011–2014)
- Children: 2
- Mother: Vesna Zmijanac
- Musical career
- Genres: Pop-rap; dance-pop; pop-folk
- Instrument: Vocals
- Labels: City Records; IDJTunes; Made in BLKN

Nikolija Popović (née Jovanović; Serbian Cyrillic: Николија Поповић, née Јовановић; born 19 October 1989) is a Serbian singer and rapper. She debuted with the single "Ćao, zdravo" in 2013. Nikolija has since released five studio albums. Her best known songs include "Milion dolara", "Alkohola litar", "Opasna igra", "Loš momak", "Nema limita", "Viski" and "MDMA". Her music videos have collectively accumulated over 700 million views on YouTube.

== Early life ==
Jovanović was born 19 October 1989 in Zagreb, SR Croatia, SFR Yugoslavia and raised in Belgrade, Serbia. She is the only child of pop-folk singer Vesna Zmijanac and economist Vlada Jovanović, who operated as the chief of marketing at the Serbian record label PGP RTS. Her parents divorced shortly after she was born. Jovanović has two half-siblings from her father's second marriage. In 1995, she appeared in her mother's music video for the song "Kad bih znala kako si". During her senior year of high school, Nikolija moved to Athens, Greece. There, she attended the American College of Greece, from which she graduated in 2013 with a degree in International Business.

== Career ==
=== 2010s: Career beginnings, No1 and Yin & Yang ===
Jovanović made her first public appearance in 2010 by competing alongside her mother on the reality TV series Survivor Srbija VIP: Philippines, where she was the first contestant to be voted out. Nikolija subsequently voluntarily left the show on medical grounds. During her studies in Athens, she started performing professionally in local nightclubs. At the beginning of 2011, Nikolija released her first song "Crazy 2night" featuring DJ Kas under the stage name Nicole, but failed to make a significant success.

After graduating from college, Nikolija relocated back to Serbia where singer Milan Stanković introduced her to the prominent songwriters and producers Nebojša Arežina and Marko Perunučić, who would become her frequent collaborators. She came on to the Serbian music scene with the house-influenced single "Ćao zdravo" featuring MC Techa, released in April 2013 under IDJTunes. The single received polarizing public reception due to its provocative lyrics and S&M-inspired music video. During the summer of 2013, she rose to further prominence after she had been featured on the song "Milion dolara" by Ana Nikolić, which also served as the title track for her fourth album.

In March 2014, Nikolija was announced as a contestant of the Serbian spin-off of Dancing with the Stars, where she finished in 8th place after six weeks of competing. Also that year, she was featured on "Alkohola litar" by Elitni Odredi and also released her solo song "Kako posle mene". With these singles Nikolija embraced singing rather than just rapping and began crossing over to more commercial pop-folk sound. With over 80 million views, Nikolija's collaboration with Elitni Odredi remains her highest performing music video. "Opasna igra" was subsequently released in June the following year to commercial success as well. Its music video was declared the most viewed Serbian video on YouTube in 2015. In October, she released her first balladic single, called "Ljubavni maneken". Nikolija made her runway debut for George Styler at the Belgrade Fashion Week in November the same year. On 20 October 2016, she released her debut album, No1, under City Records. It features previously released singles and three new songs: "101 Propušteni poziv", "Plavo more" and "Pucaj zbog nas". The album was sold in a shipment of 50,000 copies.

Nikolija released "Promeni mi planove" in March 2017. In July, it was followed by the single "Loš momak", produced by Coby. The single's music video has collected over 50 million views. Same month, it was revealed that Nikolija would star in the dystopian action film Volja sinovljeva, directed by Nemanja Ćeranić. Nikolija's role, however, did not make the final cut of the movie, which was eventually released in 2024 after facing setbacks. In October 2017, she released "Moj tempo". During the following year, Jovanović released three singles in succession: "Malo", "Nema limita" and "Slažem". The music video for "Nema limita", which was directed by Ćeranić and inspired by Volja Sinovljeva, has amassed over 45 million views.

Her second studio album, Yin & Yang, was released under IDJTunes on 24 April 2019. It was preceded by two official singles: the title track and "Nije lako biti ja" featuring rapper Fox, and it also included three standalone releases: "Loš momak", "Nema limita" and "Slažem" as bonus tracks on the physical edition. A month after the album's release, it was announced that Nikolija and Relja Popović would release a duet, entitled "Meduza". Their collaboration is currently Nikolija's most successful release on Spotify. In July, she promoted her album at the Ulaz music festival in Belgrade. In September, Jovanović released "Sija grad".

=== 2020s: Aurora, Lavina and Sila ===
In December 2020, Nikolija and her half-sister launched a fashion brand, called About Me, with streetwear designed by her. The following year, she collaborated with Teya Dora on the soundtrack single for the thriller Južni Vetar 2: Ubrzanje, titled "Ulice". Her third studio album, Aurora, was released on December 4, 2022. It was Nikolija's first album released through Made In BLKN Records, founded by Relja Popović in distribution deal with IDJTunes. Aurora features seven tracks that were released as individual singles. She promoted the first half of the album at the Belgrade Music Week festival in August. The following January, Nikolija performed at the 2023 Music Awards Ceremony, where she also won for the "Best Trap Song by a Female Artist" with "Pilot".

On 15 March 2024, Nikolija released Lavina. It charted in Austria and Switzerland, whilst four tracks from the album also simultaneously debuted on Billboard's Croatia Songs chart. Lavina was followed by Nikolija's fifth album, Sila, on 25 April 2025. It marked the first album where Nikolija also contributed as a songwriter. In August, she collaborated with rapper Biba on the single "MDMA", which peaked at number one in Croatia for five consecutive weeks. On November 27, Nikolija is set to hold her first solo concert at Belgrade's Sava Centar, titled "Silja je u nama" (Force is Within us).

== Personal life ==
Reportedly, Nikolija was in a relationship with Greek NBA player Thanasis Antetokounmpo between 2011 and 2014.

In 2014, Nikolija began dating musician and actor Relja Popović through their collaboration on the single "Alkohola litar". The couple has two daughters, Rea and Hana, born on 26 September 2016 and 17 July 2021, respectfully. On 19 October 2026, Popović proposed to Nikolija during her 37th birthday party. They got married immediately afterward.

On the topic of cyberbullying, Nikolija has been vocal about online harassment she has received when her relationship with Popović was alleged to be the reason behind the breakup of Elitni Odredi in early 2015. In April 2023, Jovanović received overwhelming praise for her honesty and transparency after she had opened up on TikTok about her much speculated past plastic surgeries and her developing relationship with her own body acceptance.

== Discography ==
Studio albums

- №1 (2016)
- Yin & Yang (2019)
- Aurora (2022)
- Lavina (2024)
- Sila (2025)

== Filmography ==
Television
Year	Title	Role	Notes
2011	Survivor Srbija	Herself (contestant)	VIP Season 1; 16th place (Quit)
2014	Ples sa zvezdama	Herself (contestant)	Season 1; Eliminated 6th

List of music videos with cameo appearances, showing year released and artists
Year	Title	Artist(s)	Ref.
1995	"Kad bih znala kako si"	Vesna Zmijanac	
2020	"Poziv"	Cvija	

== Awards and nominations ==
List of awards and nominations of Nikolija
Year	Award	Category	Nominee/work	Result	Ref.
2013	OGAE Video Contest	Music Video of the Year	"Milion dolara" (Ana Nikolić ft. Nikolija)	Nominated	
2019	Music Awards Ceremony	Modern Dance Song of the Year	"Nema limita"	Nominated	
2020	Music Awards Ceremony	Trap Collaboration of the Year	"Meduza" (Relja feat. Nikolija)	Nominated	
2023	Music Awards Ceremony	Female Trap Song of the Year	"Pilot"	Won	
2023	Music Awards Ceremony	Balkan Trap Song of the Year	"Dodole"	Nominated	
