= Elitni Odredi =

Serbian pop duo

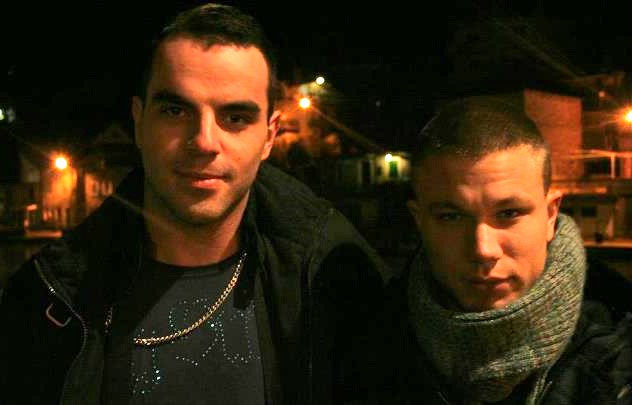
- Vlada Matović (left) and Relja Popović (right)

Background information
- Origin: Belgrade, Serbia
- Genres: Pop; pop-folk; EDM
- Years active: 2005–2015
- Labels: IDJ (singles); Gold (album)
- Members: Relja Popović (Drima); Vladimir Matović (Wonta)

Elitni Odredi (Serbian Cyrillic: Елитни Одреди, English: Elite Units) was a Serbian pop duo from Belgrade, formed in 2005. They were composed of two musicians and long-time friends; Relja Popović and Vladimir Matović. Initially an underground hip-hop group, they reached mainstream success by switching to a more commercial and club-oriented sound.

Elitni Odredi was also one of the first regional acts to use platforms such as Myspace and YouTube to promote their music, while generally avoiding media. They are recognised as one of the most successful and iconic regional acts of the early 2010s.

== History ==
The group, initially named Ulični Pesnici Crew (Street Poets Crew), was formed by two classmates, Relja Popović and Vladimir Matović, in seventh grade. They renamed it to Elitni Odredi in 2005 and included Nemanja Poznanović and producer Vladan Paunović. The first songs they released were "Ako Ste Za Rakiju" (If You Want Rakija), "Biće Ekstra" (It's Gonna Be Awesome), "Šale" (Jokes) and others. However, only upon the release of "Moja Jedina" (My Only One) featuring Nemanja Poznanović (Padrino) and produced by Paunović, in 2006, the group gained widespread fame across Serbia and other former Yugoslav countries. Poznanović and Paunović soon split with the group.

Their first and to date only body of work, titled Oko Sveta (English: Around The World), was released in 2010 through Gold production. The album was influenced by Kanye West's 808s & Heartbreak with its use of Auto-Tune vocal processor and R&B influence. It spawned several stand out hits such as "Raj" (Heaven), "Džek i Čivas" (Jack and Chivas), "Ljubav i Milion Dolara" (Love and Million Dollars) and "Samo Da Si Sa Mnom" (Only that You're with Me).

In October 2011, they released single "Kao kokain" (Like Cocaine). A month later, Elitni Odredi were featured on "Beograd" (Belgrade) by DJ Shone alongside Anabela. With these releases their sound shifted to more electronic and pop, which brought them mainstream success. Elitni Odredi were also among few non-folk acts to perform in clubs throughout Serbian diaspora.

In August 2012, they released "Ne koči" (Don't Pull Over) under IDJTunes, which was pop-folk-oriented. While in September, Elitni Odredi had a collaboration with singer Mia Borisavljević, titled "Nisi s njom" (You Are not with Her). A month later, they also released "Ljubavi moja" (My Love) featuring Dado Polumenta.

Single "Zapali grad" (Burn Down The City) was released in October the following year. In December, duo released "Ima mnogo žena i kafana" (There's a lot of Women and Kafanas).

They then embarked on an Australian tour at the beginning of 2014. In July, Elitni Odredi released "Ona sija" (She Shines). Then in October, they collaborated with Nikolija on "Alkohola litar" (Liter of Alcohol). Despite being their final single, it is also their most viewed one with over seventy five million views.

After several months of media speculation, in an interview for Prva TV in January 2015, Elitni Odredi announced that they were going on a hiatus to focus on solo projects, claiming that they've "overgrown" the group. Many fans, fuelled by media disinformation, blamed Nikolija Jovanović for the group's breakup, because of her pregnancy with Popović's child.

== Members ==
- Relja Popović (born on August 2 1989, Belgrade)
- Vladimir Vlada Matović (born on February 2 1989, Belgrade)

== Discography ==
Studio albums

- Oko sveta (2010)

Singles

- "Kao kokain" (2011); feat. Ivana Krunić
- "Beograd" (2011); DJ Shone feat. Elitni Odredi and Anabela
- "Ne koči" (2012)
- "Nisi s njom" (2012); feat. DJ Marconi, DJ Silver and Mia Borisavljević
- "Ljubavi moja" (2012); feat. Dado Polumenta
- "Zapali grad" (2013)
- "Ima mnogo žena i kafana" (2013)
- "Ona sija" (2014); feat. DJ Mateo
- "Alkohola litar" (2014); DJ Mlađa feat. Elitni Odredi and Nikolija

== See also ==
- Music of Serbia
