= Aleksandar Josipović =

French consultant and dancer

- Born: January 15, 1981 (age 45); Paris, France
- Website: bydraleksandar.com

Aleksandar Josipović (born January 15, 1981) is a French former professional dancer of Yugoslav origin and a sports dance champion who has won several national and international titles. He later worked as a marketing consultant, brand strategist, and author, specializing in the use of artificial intelligence (AI) in branding and marketing.

== Early life and education ==
Josipović was born on January 15, 1981 in Paris, France. He studied at the Faculty of Mathematics at the University of Belgrade from 2000 to 2002. He trained in dance at the Centre national de la Danse (CND) in Paris between 2005 and 2009 and completed postdoctoral studies in dance movement therapy at Codarts University for the Arts in Rotterdam from 2006 to 2007. From 2008 to 2009, he completed a master's degree in neuro-linguistic programming at the University of California, Santa Cruz (UCSC).

He later earned a master's degree in psychoanalysis and psychotherapy from Codarts and a Master of Business Administration (MBA) from the University of Belgrade. He also completed executive education programs at Harvard Business School, including Power and Influence for Positive Impact and Organizational Leadership.

He completed his PhD in business administration, with a focus on the impact of advanced healthcare technologies.

== Career ==
=== Dance career ===
Josipović began his career as a professional dancer and ballroom competitor. He performed as a soloist at the Moulin Rouge cabaret in Paris for approximately 15 years. In 2008, he served as a master of ceremonies at the Eurovision Song Contest 2008. He also appeared as a judge on the Serbian version of Dancing with the Stars.

He won multiple national ballroom dancing titles and was a finalist at the Golden World Cup in England and a semifinalist at the World Cup in Hungary. He has also performed at events attended by members of royal families and heads of state.

=== Brand strategy and marketing consulting ===
Since the early 2000s, Josipović has specialized in marketing and strategic consulting, with a focus on the luxury sector. As an independent advisor, he has worked on brand positioning, digital strategy, and market expansion. His work integrates artificial intelligence into marketing practices.

He has spoken at industry conferences such as IMCAS, AMWC, and the InMode Summit.

== Publications ==
Josipović is the author of several books. His first book was published under the auspices of CID UNESCO. Proceeds from his publications have been donated to humanitarian causes, including aid for the 2014 Balkan floods.
