= Relja Popović =

Serbian rapper and actor (born 1989)

- Реља Поповић
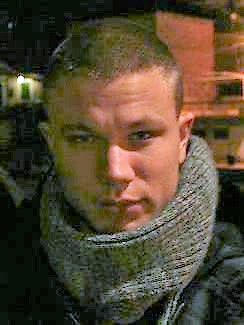
- Popović in 2012
- Born: 2 August 1989 (age 37); Belgrade, SR Serbia, SFR Yugoslavia
- Other name: Drima
- Occupations: Actor; rapper; singer; songwriter; record executive
- Years active: 2005–present
- Spouse: Nikolija Jovanović (m. 2026)
- Children: 2
- Musical career
- Genres: Hip-hop; pop rap
- Labels: IDJTunes; Made In BLKN
- Formerly of: Elitni Odredi

Relja Popović (Serbian Cyrillic: Реља Поповић; born 2 August 1989) is a Serbian musician and actor. He first rose to prominence as a member of the hip-hop duo Elitni Odredi with fellow rapper Vlada Matović. Formed in 2005, Elitno Odredi released numerous hit singles and one album, Oko sveta (2010). After their disbandment in 2015, Relja pursued a solo career. His debut album, Hotel Jugoslavija, was released in 2025. Popović is the co-founder of the record label Made In BLKN Records.

As an actor, he is recognized for his performances in the movies Ordinary People (2009) and The Parade (2011). Popović became the youngest winner of the Heart of Sarajevo award for his role in Ordinary People. In 2021, he joined the cast of the television series Besa. Additionally, Relja has served as a judge and coach on the singing competition show IDJ Show since 2022.

== Early life ==
Popović was born on 2 August 1989, in Belgrade, SFR Yugoslavia. His mother, Zoja Begolli (née Đoković) was a ballet dancer at the National Theatre in Belgrade and lecturer at the Academy of Arts. His father, Srđan Popović, worked as a sports journalist for the daily newspaper Večernje novosti. Popović lost his father in 1991, and his mother remarried to Kosovar actor Faruk Begolli, whom she divorced after 17 years of marriage. She died in 2017. Popović grew up in the Paviljoni neighborhood of New Belgrade. Relja stated that he found passion for hip-hop as a child, being exposed by his older brother Miša to artists such as Eminem, Jay-Z and Juice.

Popović graduated from the High School of Hospitality and Tourism in downtown Belgrade. In May 2008, he was shot in stomach while defending his girlfriend from a middle age man in a pub, resulting in the removal of his kidney and spleen. The assaulter was subsequently sentenced to six and a half years in prison.

== Career ==
=== Elitni Odredi and early acting ventures ===
Popović began his professional music career in 2005 alongside his childhood friend Vladimir Matović, as a part of Elitni Odredi. Together they released one studio album, titled Oko sveta (2010), and several standalone singles. Elitni Odredi broke to mainstream attention in 2011 with the singles "Kao kokain" and "Beograd". They were one of the first urban artists to perform for Serbian diaspora in the European Union and Australia. At the beginning of 2015, Elitni Odredi eventually announced their disbandment to focus on solo projects.

Regarding his acting beginnings, Popović made his on screen debut in the short film Dremano oko (2003), directed by Vladimir Perišić. He continued working with Perišić on his full-length feature film Ordinary People from 2009. His performance in this movie earned Popović the Best Actor Award at Cottbus East European Film Festival and at Sarajevo Film Festival, making him the youngest recipient of the Heart of Sarajevo award. In 2011, he also starred in The Parade, directed by Srđan Dragojević. The movie was enlisted as the fourth biggest box office success of Serbian cinematography in the 2010s.

=== 2015-2025: Solo music beginnings, Made In BLKN, Hotel Jugoslavija ===
Following the duo's hiatus, Popović pursued a solo career with the release of his first single "Beograd još živi" in April 2015. During the next couple of years, it was succeeded by a series of other standalone singles, which included hit songs like "Crni sin" (2016) featuring Coby and Cvija, "Samo jako" (2017) featuring Coby and Stoja, "Latino Evropa" (2018) and "Mi Amor" (2018). In 2019, Relja announced his debut album, titled Made In Balkan. The project ended up consisting of ten songs that were also released as standalone singles. The first part, released in 2019, included singles - "Princeza na belom", "Meduza" featuring Nikolija, "Takvi kao ja", "Tuga iz Porschea" and "Made In Balkan". In July 2019, the songs were promoted at Ulaz music festival in Belgrade. The following year, Popović established Made In BLKN Records in distribution deal with IDJTunes. The company was also expanded to a clothing brand in 2021. Between 2020 and 2021, Relja released singles form the second part of his debut project - "Maria", "Genge" featuring Rasta, "Offline" featuring Devito, "Manije" and "Kraj je". In December 2021, Popović joined the cast of the crime drama series Besa.

The following March, he was announced as a judge and coach on the singing competition IDJ Show. His contestant Amna Alajbegović went on to the win the first season in June 2022. Same year, Relja also collaborated with Devito on the singles "Omađijala" and "Do zore", and with Nucci on "Zovite doktore". Both "Omađijala" and "Zovite doktore" were top-ten singles in Croatia, peaking at number two and eight, respectively. In August 2022, Popović performed at Music Week Festival in Ušće, Belgrade. In January 2024, Popović scored his first Billboard number one single with the song "Sve si znala", which peaked atop of Croatia Songs chart. Later that year, he had a lead role in the movie "Videoteka", which had its premier at 2024 FEST. On 22 May 2024, he released a six-track EP, titled Stroberi. The following month, Relja performed at the Red Bull SoundClash concert in Belgrade against Marija Šerifović.

On 30 May 2025, Popović released his debut album, Hotel Jugoslavija, a decade after he had pursued a solo career. The album received positive reception and charted in Austria and Switzerland. Music video for the track "Baš ti se sviđa" with Nikolija was also named the "most controversial moment in Balkan pop culture" of 2025 by Vogue Adria, due to its highly polarizing sex positive message.

== Personal life ==
Popović graduated from the Faculty of Media and Communications at the Singidunum University and also studied acting at the Academy of Arts in Belgrade.

He has been in a relationship with singer Nikolija Jovanović since 2014, when Elitni Odredi collaborated with her on “Alkohola litar.” The couple has two daughters. On 21 October 2026, Popović and Jovanović revealed they had gotten married in a secret ceremony.

== Filmography ==
=== Film ===
List of performances of Relja Popović in film
Title	Year	Role
Dremano oko	2003	Boy
Ordinary People	2009	Johnny
The Parade	2011	Vuk
Videoteka	2024	Sale

=== Television ===
List of performances of Relja Popović on television
Title	Year	Role	Notes
Besa	2021-present	Igi	Season 2; main character
IDJ Show	2022-present	Himself	As judge & mentor

== Discography ==
=== Studio albums ===
List of studio albums, showing release date, label and track listings
Title
Details
Peak chart positions
Notes
AUT

SUI

Hotel Jugoslavija
- Released: 30 May 2025
- Label: Made in BLKN
- Format: Digital download, streaming
13
48
Track listing
- No.	Title	Length
  1.	"Dobri umiru mladi"	2:23
  2.	"Zverka" (featuring 8nula8 and Eevke)	3:15
  3.	"Limiti"	2:34
  4.	"Baš ti se sviđa" (featuring Nikolija)	3:07
  5.	"Prvi kraj"	3:17
  6.	"Hektar"	2:07
  7.	"Slatka so"	2:25
  8.	"Sex mashina"	2:24
  9.	"Zvecka oružje" (featuring Đorđe)	3:20
  10.	"Gde je Bog"	3:00
  Total length:		27:52

=== Extended plays ===
List of extended plays (EPs), showing release date, label, chart positions and track listings
Title	Details	Peak chart positions		Notes
Title	Details	AUT	SUI	Notes
Stroberi	Released: 22 May 2024; Label: Made in BLKN; Format: Digital download, streaming	43	77	Track listing: | No. | Title | Length | |---|---|---| | 1. | "Slavija" (featuring Aurah) | 3:05 | | 2. | "Ribe zločeste" | 2:46 | | 3. | "Ma bolje sam" | 2:35 | | 4. | "OMB" (with Nucci) | 2:33 | | 5. | "12xJanuar" (with Đana) | 3:10 | | 6. | "Za tobom lud" | 2:32 | | Total length: | | 17:41 |
Beograđanka	Released: 14 March 2026; Label: Made in BLKN; Format: Digital download, streaming	—	—	Track listing: | No. | Title | Length | |---|---|---| | 1. | "Intercontinental" | 3:26 | | 2. | "Odiseja" | 3:30 | | 3. | "El Dorado" | 2:57 | | Total length: | | 9:53 |
Varljivo leto	Released: 12 July 2026; Label: Made in BLKN; Format: Digital download, streaming	—	—	Track listing: | No. | Title | Length | |---|---|---| | 1. | "21" | 2:18 | | 2. | "Top Gun" | 2:37 | | 3. | "Supernova" | 3:18 | | Total length: | | 8:13 |

=== Singles ===
==== As lead artist ====
List of singles as lead artist, with selected chart positions and showing year released
Title	Year	Peak chart positions	Album
Title	Year	CRO Billb.	Album
"Beograd još živi"	2015	*	Non-album singles
"Hoću da se napijem"	2015	*	Non-album singles
"Opet te nema" (featuring Boban Rajović)	2015	*	Non-album singles
"Pakao od žene"	2015	*	Non-album singles
"Crni sin" (with Cvija featuring Coby)	2016	*	Heroji
"Trošim pare"	2016	*	Non-album singles
"Lom"	2017	*	Non-album singles
"Samo jako" (featuring Coby and Stoja)	2017	*	Non-album singles
"Adrenalina"	2017	*	Non-album singles
"Latino Evropa"	2018	*	Non-album singles
"Dolce vita"	2018	*	Non-album singles
"Mi amor"	2018	*	Non-album singles
"Princeza na belom"	2019	*	Made in Balkan
"Meduza" (featuring Nikolija)	2019	*	Made in Balkan
"Takvi kao ja"	2019	*	Made in Balkan
"Tuga iz Porschea"	2019	*	Made in Balkan
"Made in Balkan"	2019	*	Made in Balkan
"Maria"	2020	*	Made in Balkan
"Genge" (with Rasta)	2020	*	Made in Balkan
"Offline" (with Devito)	2020	*	Made in Balkan
"Manije"	2021	*	Made in Balkan
"Kraj je"	2021	*	Made in Balkan
"Oguccio sam je" (with Eevke and 8nula8)	2021	*	Non-album singles
"Omađijala" (with Devito)	2022	2	Non-album singles
"Do zore" (with Devito)	2022	—	Non-album singles
"Dizajner"	2022	—	Non-album singles
"Zovite doktore" (with Nucci)	2022	8	Non-album singles
"Pati pati"	2022	—	Non-album singles
"Ljubi brat"	2022	21	Non-album singles
"Turira" (with Rasta)	2023	11	Non-album singles
"Fatalna"	2023	16	Non-album singles
"Hladno leto"	2023	—	Non-album singles
"Ola ola" (with Devito)	2023	14	Non-album singles
"Sve si znala"	2024	1	Non-album singles
"Nemir" (with Nataša Bekvalac)	2024	—	Non-album singles
"Bez tebe"	2025	—	Non-album singles
"Habibi" (with Maya Berović)	2025	—	Non-album singles
"—" denotes a recording that did not chart. "*" denotes a recording released before the chart's launch.

==== As featured artist ====
List of singles as featured artist, with selected chart positions and showing year released
Title	Year	Album
"Mami mami" (Link featuring Relja and Rasta)	2024	Non-album single

==== Promotional singles ====
List of promotional singles, with selected chart positions and showing year released
Title	Year	Peak chart positions	Album
Title	Year	CRO Billb.	Album
"Htela je da zna" (Devito featuring Relja)	2023	—	Plava krv
"12xJanuar" (with Đana)	2024	22	Stroberi
"OMB" (with Nucci)	2024	6	Stroberi
"Zapali grad" (Remix)	2024	—	Non-album single
"—" denotes a recording that did not chart.

=== Other charted songs ===
List of other charted songs, with selected chart positions and showing year released
Title	Year	Peak chart positions	Album
Title	Year	CRO Billb.	Album
"Za tobom lud"	2024	8	Stroberi
"Preko linije" (Nucci featuring Relja)	2024	19	Zamena za bol
"Baš ti se sviđa" (featuring Nikolija)	2025	3	Hotel Jugoslavija
"Limiti"	2025	21	Hotel Jugoslavija
"Sex mashina"	2025	23	Hotel Jugoslavija
"Intercontinental"	2026	1	Beograđanka

=== Guest appearances ===
List of non-single guest appearances, with other performing artists, showing year released and album name
Title	Year	Other artist(s)	Album
"Pištolj"	2023	Kendi	Dodirne tačke
"Preko linije"	2024	Nucci	Zamena za bol
"Igra"	2026	Vekac	III

== Awards and nominations ==
List of awards nominated for or won by Relja Popović
Year	Award	Category	Nominee/work	Result	Ref.
2009	Sarajevo Film Festival	Best Actor	Himself (Ordinary People)	Won	
2009	Cottbus Film Festival of Young East European Cinema	Outstanding Actor	Himself (Ordinary People)	Won	
2020	Music Awards Ceremony	Trap Collaboration of the Year	"Meduza"	Nominated	
2023	Music Awards Ceremony	New Age Collaboration	"Omađijala"	Nominated	
