= Teodora discography =

- Studio albums: 2
- Live albums: 1
- Singles: 37
- Promotional singles: 7

Serbian singer Teodora Džehverović has released two studio albums, one live album and 37 singles. She began her solo career by releasing the single "U četiri oka" in December 2016. Her debut album Borbena was released through IDJTunes in March 2019.

== Albums ==
=== Studio albums ===
List of studio albums, showing release date, label, chart positions, circulations and track listings
Title	Details	Peak chart positions		Notes
Title	Details	AUT	SUI	Notes
Borbena	Released: 7 March 2019; Label: IDJTunes; Format: CD, digital download, streaming	—	—	Track listing: Digital edition | No. | Title | Length | |---|---|---| | 1. | "Linija" | 2:35 | | 2. | "Story" | 2:59 | | 3. | "Tom Ford" | 3:08 | | 4. | "Gade" | 3:11 | | 5. | "Taxi" | 3:10 | | 6. | "Alternativa" | 2:56 | | 7. | "Borbena" | 2:52 | | Total length: | | 20:53 | Physical edition | No. | Title | Length | |---|---|---| | 8. | "Rari" (with Coby) | 2:49 | | 9. | "Kristijan Grej" | 3:16 | | Total length: | | 26:58 |
Žena bez adrese	Released: 15 May 2024; Label: SevenSky; Format: Digital download, streaming	26	64	Track listing: | No. | Title | Length | |---|---|---| | 1. | "Karma" | 3:09 | | 2. | "Žena bez adrese" | 2:27 | | 3. | "Cinema" (with Devito) | 3:17 | | 4. | "Čuka" | 2:32 | | 5. | "Aya Sofya" | 2:36 | | 6. | "Vodolija" | 2:15 | | 7. | "Beograde" (with Albino) | 2:52 | | 8. | "Šta bi ti" | 2:12 | | 9. | "Bruka" | 2:19 | | 10. | "Ostavljaš" | 2:24 | | 11. | "Namera" (with Rasta) | 2:44 | | Total length: | | 28:47 |

=== Live albums ===
Title	Details
Belgrade Music Week 2023 (Live)	Released: 28 July 2023; Label: Sky Music; Format: Digital download, streaming

== Singles ==
=== As lead artist ===
Title	Year	Peak chart positions	Album
Title	Year	CRO Billb.	Album
"U četiri oka"	2016	*	Non-album singles
"Hijena" (with Vuk Mob)	2017	*	Non-album singles
"Kristijan Grej" (Note: "Kristijan Grej" and "Rari" are included only in the physical edition of Borbena.)	2017	*	Borbena
"Crni vitez"	2018	*	Non-album single
"Rari" (with Coby)	2018	*	Borbena
"Čarolija"	2019	*	Non-album singles
"Tresi tresi"	2019	*	Non-album singles
"Vudu" (with Devito)	2020	*	Non-album singles
"Gasolina"	2020	*	Non-album singles
"Trezna"	2020	*	Non-album singles
"Candy" (with MC Stojan)	2021	*	Non-album singles
"Voli me, voli me" (with MC Stojan)	2021	*	Non-album singles
"Malena" (with Emina)	2021	*	Non-album singles
"Kučka"	2021	*	Non-album singles
"Vu"	2021	*	Non-album singles
"Most na Adi"	2022	—	Non-album singles
"Tvoje magije"	2022	—	Non-album singles
"Kontroverzne" (with Hurricane)	2022	18	Non-album singles
"Blef" (with MC Stojan and Edita)	2022	—	Non-album singles
"Aventador" (with Mahrina)	2022	14	Non-album singles
"Drift" (with Breskvica)	2023	1	Non-album singles
"Polumesec"	2023	3	Non-album singles
"Letnja avantura" (with Pajak)	2023	14	Non-album singles
"Ice" (with Albino)	2023	—	Non-album singles
"Dijamanti"	2025	—	Non-album singles
"Bad"	2025	—	Non-album singles
"Divlja" (with Voyage)	2025	—	Non-album singles
"101 zmija" (with Jala Brat)	2025	20	Non-album singles
"Plan B"	2026	—	Non-album singles
"Manekenka"	2026	—	Non-album singles
"Déjà vu"	2026	—	Non-album singles
"—" denotes a recording that did not chart. "*" denotes a recording that was released before the chart was launched.

=== As featured artist ===
Title	Year	Album
"Gledaj mene" (In Vivo featuring TeodoRa and DJ Tazz)	2017	Non-album singles
"Pirana" (Đans featuring Young Palk and TeodoRa)	2017	Non-album singles
"Kulira" (In Vivo featuring TeodoRa)	2017	Non-album singles
"Komiran" (Sha featuring Teodora)	2018	Sha & Friends
"Nokaut" (Cvija featuring Teodora)	2019	Non-album single
"Kairo" (In Vivo featuring Teodora)	2019	Mars i Venera

=== Promotional singles ===
Title	Year	Peak chart positions		Album
Title	Year	AUT	CRO Billb.	Album
"Mashup"	2020	—	—	Non-album singles
"Medley performance MAC 2023" (with Mahrina featuring Devito)	2023	—	—	Non-album singles
"Vodi me" (Devito featuring Teodora)	2023	—	25	Plava krv
"Namera" (with Rasta)	2024	—	—	Žena bez adrese
"Cinema" (with Devito)	2024	63	—	Žena bez adrese
"Beograde" (with Albino)	2024	—	—	Žena bez adrese
"6 ujutru" (with Jala Brat and Buba Corelli)	2025	32	9	Roze suze

== Other charted songs ==
Title	Year	Peak chart positions	Album
Title	Year	CRO Billb.	Album
"Čuka"	2024	24	Žena bez adrese
