= Bez kontrole =

2023 debut album by Sara Jo

Studio album by Sara Jo
- Released: 21 June 2023
- Genre: Pop; R&B; hip hop
- Length: 27:11
- Language: Serbian; Italian
- Label: Bassivity Digital
- Producer: Luxonee; Coby; Kei; MBM; Priki; Godday

Singles from Bez kontrole
- 1. "Divlja" Released: October 23, 2021; 2. "Zar ne" Released: July 15, 2022; 3. "U Glavi" Released: June 22, 2023; 4. "Tako Hodam" Released: December 03, 2023; 5. "Sandra Meljničenko (Feat. Mimi Mercedez)" Released: January 04, 2024

Bez kontrole (transl. Out of Control) is the debut studio album by Serbian singer Sara Jo. It was released digitally on 21 June 2023 through Bassivity Digital. The album was preceded by two singles: "Divlja" (2021) and "Zar ne" (2022). Bez kontrole features guest vocals from rapper Mimi Mercedez on the track "Sandra Meljničenko". The production on the album was mainly handled by Luka Jovanović Luxonee, Nikola Kirćanski Kei and Slobodan Veljković Coby.

== Background and promotion ==
Bez kontrole was released over a decade since Sara Jo had begun her career on the second season of Prvi glas Srbije in 2012. The album's lead single, "Divlja", was released on 23 October 2021. It was followed by "Zar ne", which was presented at the Skale Festival in Herceg Novi in June 2022. The following year, during the 2023 Music Awards Ceremony, held in the Belgrade Arena on January 25, Sara Jo performed "Divlja" and teased "U glavi" and "Zlo". After media speculations, the album, titled Bez kontrole after the first verse from "Divlja", was officially announced on 19 June 2023. The music video for "U glavi" was released a day after the album's release.

On December 3, Jovanović released the music video for "Tako hodam", sponsored by the Serbian fashion house Mona.

== Music and lyrics ==
Musically, Bez kontrole is generally pop-oriented, whilst including dance-pop, contemporary R&B and hip hop sound. The album features influences from slow jam on the tracks like "Glas" (The Voice), "Zar ne" (Right[?]) and "Sudar" (Crash). "Glas" was also recorded a capella, featuring only Jovanoic's vocals and beatboxing in the background. "Tako hodam" (I Walk Like That) was influenced by voguing and the ballroom scene. Lyrically, the album overall explores themes of love and sexual liberation. The lyrics of "Sandra Meljničenko" refer to Aleksandra Melnichenko, former member of the 90s girl group Models and wife of billionaire entrepreneur Andrey Melnichenko, as the symbol of power and confidence.

== Critical reception ==
Professional ratings
Review scores
Source	Rating
Muzika.hr	3.5/5 stars

In a review entitled "Slightly forced pop", Kristina Kolar from Muzika.hr described Bez kontrole as a "rushed, uninspired pop project". The critic further wrote, "despite its name, the album is not so much Out of Control". The review was unfavorable of the lack of ingenuity and the use of clichés in lyrics. On the other hand, Kolar highlighted the album's production as "immaculate" and the potential in its "retro R&B colors", which she compared to Erykah Badu and Destiny's Child.

== Track listing ==
Bez kontrole track listing
No.	Title	Writer(s)	Producer(s)	Length
1.	"Zlo"	Nikola Kirćanski Kei	Luka Jovanović Luxonee; Kei	2:03
2.	"Privatni manijak"	Andrea Aleksić Rea; Slobodan Veljković Coby	Coby	3:01
3.	"U glavi"	Kirćanski	Luxonee; Kei	2:30
4.	"Želim"	Aleksandra Kovač; Roman Goršek	Coby; Mattia Stanišljević MBM	3:05
5.	"Divlja"	Kirćanski; Sara Jovanović; Veljković	Coby; Kei	2:44
6.	"Glas"	Kirćanski; Veljković	Coby; Luxonee	2:50
7.	"Sandra Meljničenko" (feat. Mimi Mercedez)	Jovanović Luxonee; Milena Janković; Veljković	Luxonee	2:28
8.	"Zar ne"	Mihajlo Jovanović; Pavle Jovanović; Kirćanski; Jovanović Luxonee	Luxonee; Haris Rahmanović Priki	2:59
9.	"Tako hodam"	Jovanović; Veljković	Coby; Bogdan Stanković Godday; MBM	2:20
10.	"Sudar"	Bojana Vunturišević; Jovanović Luxonee; Jovanović	Luxonee	3:08
Total length:				27:11

== Release history ==
Bez kontrole release history
Region	Date	Format	Label
Various	21 June 2023	Digital download; streaming	Bassivity Digital
