= Music Awards Ceremony =

West Balkan popular music awards

- Awarded for: Excellence in music
- Country: Serbia; Croatia; Bosnia and Herzegovina; Slovenia; North Macedonia; Montenegro
- Presented by: Skymedia Group
- First award: 29 January 2019; 7 years ago
- Website: musicawardsceremony.rs

Television/radio coverage
- Network: various

The Music Awards Ceremony (often simply called the MAC) are annual popular music awards for Serbia, Croatia, Bosnia and Herzegovina, Slovenia, North Macedonia and Montenegro presented by Skymedia Group. The awards were first held on 29 January 2019 at the Belgrade Arena. The MAC is broadcast on several regional television networks, as well as via YouTube. It consists of up to 20 different categories, which are based on public votes, and other special awards, whose winners are determined by the organizers. MAC is recognized as one of the highest profile music awards ceremony in the western Balkans.

Music Awards Ceremony has received international critical acclaim. In August 2022, it was also declared the manifestations of special importance for the City of Belgrade.

== Ceremonies ==
Event	Date	Venue	Host(s)	Artist of the Year winner(s)	Golden MAC for Authenticity Winner	Master of Ceremony Winner	Ref
1st	29 January 2019	Belgrade Arena	Aida Jokanović; Ida Prester; Zvonimir Đukić	Tony Cetinski; Marija Šerifović	Stjepan Hauser	None	
2nd	27 January 2020	Belgrade Arena	Galeb Nikačević; Tamara Todevska; Ana Radišić	Saša Matić; Nina Badrić	Senidah	None	
3rd	25 January 2023	Belgrade Arena	Jelena Gavrilović; Tonči Huljić	Aco Pejović	Konstrakta	Coby	
3rd	26 January 2023	Belgrade Arena	Mimi Mercedez; Voyage	Aco Pejović	Konstrakta	Coby	

== Categories ==
=== Current ===
The 2023 MAC announced the following seventeen award categories based on the public vote.

- Male Pop Song of the Year (2019-present)
- Female Pop Song of the Year (2019-present)
- Alternative Pop Song Year (2019-present)
- Pop-Folk Song of the Year (2020-present)
- Folk Song of the Year (2019-present)
- World Music Song of the Year (2019-present)
- Rock Song of the Year (2019-present)
- Rap/Hip Hop Song of the Year (2019-present)
- Collaboration of the Year (2020-present)
- Male Trap Song of the Year (2023-present)
- Female Trap Song of the Year (2023-present)
- Balkan Trap Song of the Year (2023-present)
- Urban Pop Song of the Year (2023-present)
- Drill Song of the Year (2023-present)
- New Age Collaboration of the Year (2020-present) (Note: Previously called Trap Collaboration of the Year)
- Concert of the Year (2019-present)
- Music Festival of the Year (2023-present)
- Album of the Year (2023-present)
- Music Video of the Year (2019-present)
- Viral Song of the Year (2023-present)

=== Defunct ===
- Band Pop Song of the Year (2019-2020)
- Pop Collaboration of the Year (2020)
- Pop-Rock Song of the Year (2020)
- Modern Dance Song of the Year (2019)
- Breakthrough Artist (2019-2020)
- Cover Song of the Year (2020)
- YouTube Star of the Year (2020)

=== Special awards ===
- Artist of the year
- Contribution to Music
- Career Achievement
- Golden MAC for Authenticity; given to acts for their "outstanding uniqueness"
- Master of Ceremony; given to new age and contemporary artist for their "remarkable success"

Contribution to Music Winners
Year	Recipient	Award
2019	EXIT	Contribution to Music
2020	Lepa Brena	Contribution to Regional Music
2020	Šaban Šaulić	Contribution to Folk Music
2020	Jala Brat and Buba Corelli	Regional Music Impact
2023	Saša Matić	Contribution to Regional Music
2023	Teodora and Devito	Contribution to Regional Music
2023	Konstrakta	Contribution to International Music
2023	KOIKOI	Contribution to International Music

== Most successful acts ==
Artists who have received most awards
Wins	Act	Awards
3	Senidah	2019 Rap/Hip Hop Song of the Year; 2020 Trap Song of the Year; 2020 Golden MAC for Authenticity
3	Petar Grašo	2019 Male Pop Song of the Year; 2020 Male Pop Song of the Year; 2023 Concert of the Year
3	Saša Matić	2020 Male Artist of the Year; 2023 Collaboration of the Year; 2023 Contribution to Regional Music
3	Voyage	2020 YouTube Star; 2023 New Age Collaboration of the Year; 2023 Viral Song of the Year

== Performances ==
Year	Performers	Ref
2019	Marija Šerifović, Jelena Rozga, Željko Joksimović, Petar Grašo, Nataša Bekvalac, Bajaga i Instruktori, Rasta, Van Gogh, Tony Cetinski, Massimo, Aca Lukas, Jelena Karleuša and Gazda Paja, Plavi orkestar, Stjepan Hauser, Emina Jahović, Sergej Ćetković, Tonči Huljić, Letu Štuke, Karolina, Lollobrigida Girls, Viva Vox	
2020	Magnifico, Nina Badrić, Oliver Mandić, Senidah, Lepa Brena, Tribute to Gru (various), Lepa Brena, Jelena Rozga, Jala Brat and Buba Corelli, Who See, Kaliopi, S.A.R.S., Tribute to Šaban Šaulić (Ilda Šaulić), Nevena Božović, Balkanopolis, Tonči Huljić, Sara Jo, Aleksandra Radović	
2023	Tonči Huljić and Jelena Gavrilović, Sara Jo, Riblja Čorba, Saša Matić and Jelena Rozga, Aco Pejović, Konstrakta & Zemlja Gruva, Dženan Lončarević, Karolina, Joker Out, Emina Jahović, Lexington Band, Petar Grašo	
2023	Nucci and Voyage, Zera, Crni Cerak, Nikolija, Mimi Mercedez, Teodora, Mahrina and Devito, Amna and Albino, Coby and Dejan Petrović Big Band, Tribute to Džej (Crni Cerak, Lacku, 2Bona, Sajfer and Veraja), Milica Pavlović	

== Broadcasts ==
Country	Channel	Premiere date
Bosnia and Herzegovina	Federalna TV (2019–2020), RTRS (2020), RTBH (2023)	2019
Croatia	RTL (2019-2020), CMC TV (2023)	2019
Montenegro	RTCG	2020
North Macedonia	Sitel (2019-2020), Kanal 5 (2023)	2019
Serbia	Prva (2019, 2023), RTV Pink (2020)	2019
Slovenia	TV3 Slovenia (2020), Planet TV (2023)	2020
