= Sara Jo =

Serbian singer-songwriter (born 1993)

Sara Jo Сара Јо
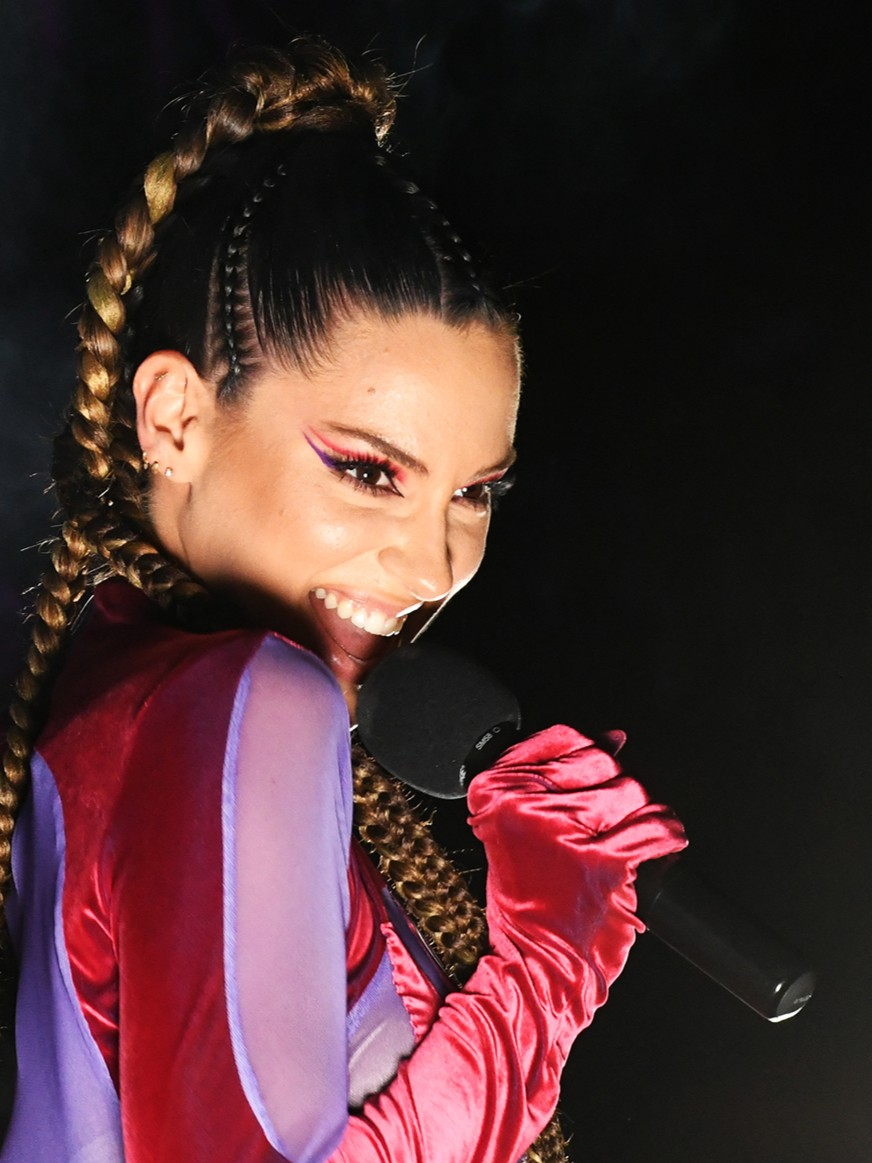
- Jovanović performing at the 2021 Belgrade Pride

Background information
- Born: Sara Jovanović; 29 October 1993 (age 32); Rome, Italy
- Origin: Belgrade, Serbia
- Genres: Pop; R&B; dance-pop
- Occupations: Singer; model; actress
- Years active: 2011–present
- Labels: IDJTunes; Bassivity Digital

Sara Jovanović (Serbian Cyrillic: Сара Јовановић; pronounced [sǎːra joʋâːnoʋit͡ɕ]; born 29 October 1993), professionally known as Sara Jo, is a Serbian singer, songwriter, model and actress. Born in Rome, she came to prominence upon competing on Prvi glas Srbije in 2012, finishing in 3rd place. Subsequently, as a member of Moje 3, Jovanović represented Serbia in the Eurovision Song Contest 2013 in Malmö, Sweden with "Ljubav je svuda". They placed 11th in the semi final, failing to reach the grand final.

Her official debut solo single, "Ko je ovde ko", was released in 2014. It was followed by a series of other standalone singles, including "Nemam vremena za to" (2017), "Mili mili" (2019) and "Muškarčina" (2022). Her debut album, Bez kontrole, was released in June 2023. It spawned two singles: "Divlja" (2021) and "Zar ne" (2022).

Additionally, Jovanović competed on the first season of Tvoje lice zvuči poznato and has also been involved as an actress in theater, television and voice acting. Moreover, she has modeled for fashion campaigns, including continuous collaboration with Adidas in Serbia since the beginnings of her career.

== Early life ==
Jovanović was born on 29 October 1993 in Rome and was raised bilingually in Serbian and Italian. She is the only child of kindergarten teacher, Jasna, and Serbian Foreign Ministry official, Saša Jovanović. In 2009, the family permanently relocated to Belgrade, where Sara graduated from the Third Grammar School. She subsequently studied Italian language at the University of Belgrade Faculty of Philology. Jovanović displayed interest in music and performance from an early age, practicing ballet and hip-hop dance. She has cited late 90's and early 00's performers like Britney Spears, TLC, Jennifer Lopez and Destiny's Child as her biggest influences in music.

== Career ==
=== 2011–2016: Career beginnings, Prvi glas Srbije and Eurovision with Moje 3 ===
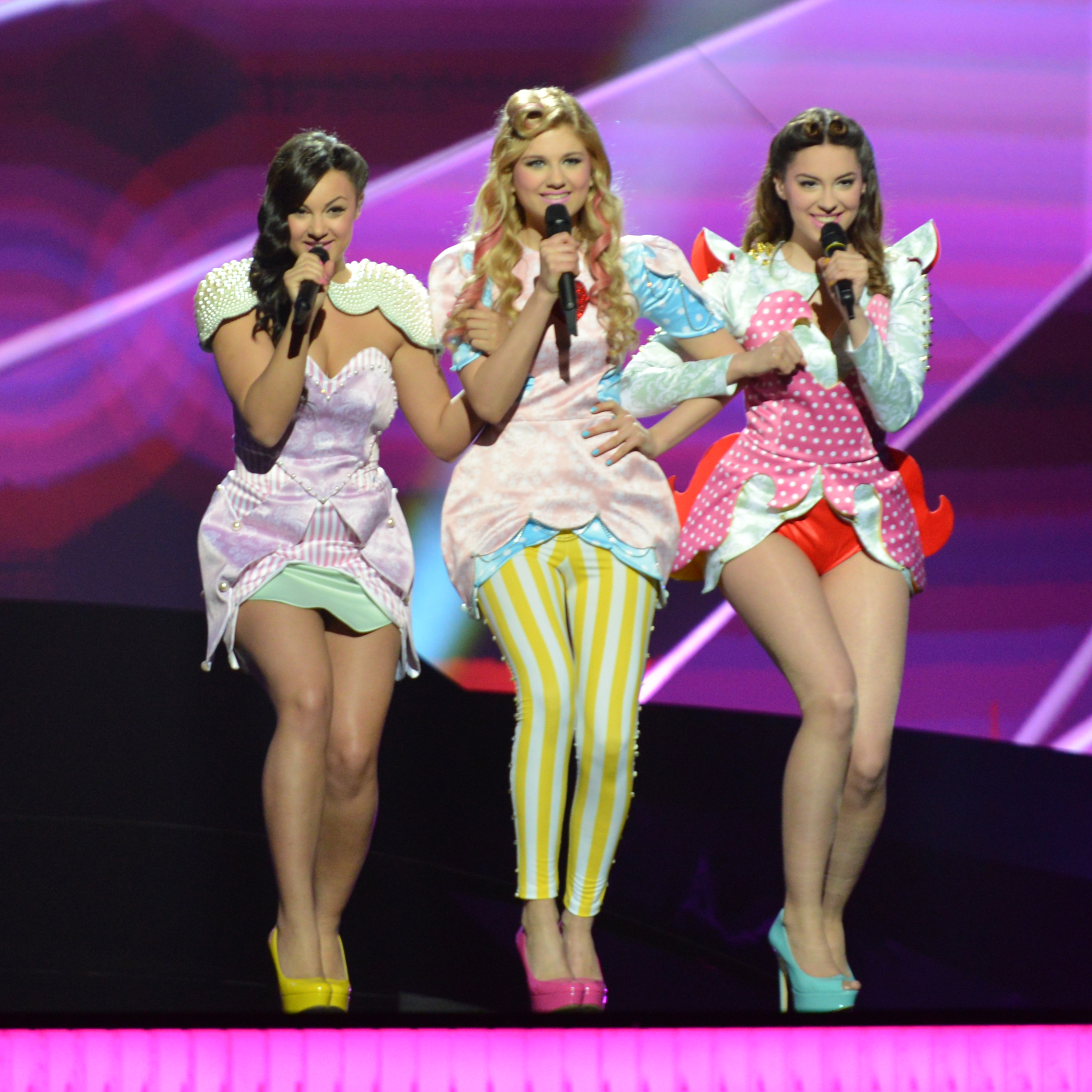
Moje 3, with Jovanović on the right, performing at a dress rehearsal of the 2013 Eurovision

After winning at an armature singing contest organized by the Serbian magazine Story with the covers she had been posting on YouTube, Jovanović received the opportunity to record her first song and music video, titled "Zauvek". In October 2011, she performed "Zauvek" at the late-night talk show Veče sa Ivanom Ivanovićem. The following year, Jovanović was also featured on four tracks by rapper MCN from his self-titled debut album.

In 2012, she auditioned for the second season of the singing competition Prvi glas Srbije. Mentored by Aleksandra Radović, Jovanović reached the show's grand final where she finished as the second runner-up. She was especially noted for her showmanship in the live show phase, being described as the "new energy on the music scene" by the Serbian Cosmopolitan. The following year, the producers of Prvi glas Srbije formed a girl group, called Moje 3, consisted of Jovanović and her fellow-finalists Mirna Radulović and Nevena Božović, in order to compete in the national selection competition for the 2013 Eurovision Song Contest. On 2 March, Moje 3 were chosen as the Serbian representatives for the 2013 Eurovision hosted by Malmö, Sweden with their song "Ljubav je svuda", by receiving 42.5% of the public votes. On May 14, they performed in the Eurovision's first semi final, placing 11th with 46 points and thus failed to qualify for the grand final. Moreover, Moje 3 also received the Barbara Dex Award for the worst dressed act.

After Eurovision she collaborated with singer Marko Mandić on the single "Ujutru", released in June 2013. In September, Jovanović became a contestant on the first season of the reality competition Tvoje lice zvuči poznato, where she placed as the runner-up to singer Ana Kokić. In June the following year, Jovanović released her first official single, titled "Ko je ovde ko", under IDJTunes. She also covered "Provokacija" by Boban Rajović for the 2014 movie Little Buddho. Jovanović subsequently released the singles "Mahovina" and "Probaj" in December 2014 and July 2016, respectively. In 2016, she also reunited with Mandić to cover "Troje" by Moby Dick for the purposes of the film The Samurai in Autumn. On 25 December 2016, in Sava Centar, Jovanović made her theatre debut, portraying Cinderella in a musical play, which subsequently toured around Serbia.

=== 2017–2022: Signing with Bassivity Digital and standalone singles ===
In May 2017, Sara Jo released the single "Nemam vremena za to", produced by Coby, under new label - Bassivity Digital. It became her first music video to collect over ten million views on YouTube. The same year, she also collaborated with Tuborg GreenFest on the single "Samo ti", which samples samples Major Lazer's "Tuborg Beat". "Samo ti" was released through Universal Music Group. Subsequently, the single "Lava" was released in May 2018.

It was followed by "Bez sna" and "Mili, mili" in January and June 2019. During her 2019 summer tour, Jovanović performed for the first time at the Exit music festival alongside other artists from Bassivity. Same year she had a recurring role in the television series Sinđelići. Jovanović also served as a mentor on a singing contest organized by Coca-Cola, called Discovered by Coke. Her contestant, Predrag Simić, with whom she also released a song, "Kao nikad pre", as a part of the competition, was eventually proclaimed the winner.

On 27 January 2020, Jovanović performed a medley of her hits at the 2020 Music Awards Ceremony, held in the Belgrade Arena. In April, she released "Kaži mi". The following July, Jovanović collaborated with Edita Aradinović on the single "Varalica". She performed alongside Marija Šerifović and Jelena Karleuša at the 2022 New Year's Eve concert in front of the House of the National Assembly in Belgrade. In February 2022, Sara Jo was announced as a contestant on the national selection for the Eurovision Song Contest 2022, called Pesma za Evroviziju '22, with her entry "Muškarčina". Based on the YouTube views, Jovanović was initially highlighted as the competition's front runner. She placed first in the second semi final on 4 March. In the final on 5 March, however, she finished as the runner-up to Konstrakta and "In corpore sano". "Muškarčina" peaked at number 12 on Billboard's Croatia Songs chart.

=== 2023-present: Bez kontrole and future projects ===
On June 21, 2023, Jovanović released her debut album, Bez kontrole, under Bassivity Digital, which was preceded by the singles "Divlja" (2022) and "Zar ne?" (2022).

== Activism ==
Recognized for continuously supporting LGBT rights in Serbia, Jovanović carried the title of the Belgrade Pride's "Godmother" in 2019. In August 2021, she also performed at the closing ceremony of the WorldPride in Copenhagen.

In November 2013, Jovanović alongside Tropico Band and Dženan Lončarević was featured on the charity single "Milio sam anđele" to raise funds for the treatment of a twenty-two-year-old woman suffering from bone cancer. In October 2020, she was a speaker on the TEDxMasarikova conference in Zenica, where she reflected on personal struggles in regards to popularity. In 2021, Jovanović also became an ambassador of the Council of Europe against hate speech.

== Personal life ==
Jovanović was in a year-long relationship with volleyball player Aleksandar Atanasijević, which was ended in May 2014. In February 2015, she was reported to be dating Serbian actor Viktor Savić. The couple broke up the following year. Between 2016 and 2018, she was then romantically involved with rapper and writer Marčelo.

She is currently in a relationship with Slovene choreographer, Žiga Sotlar.

== Discography ==
=== Studio albums ===
Title
Bez kontrole
Album details
- Released: 21 June 2023
- Label: Bassivity Digital
- Format: Digital download, streaming
Notes
Track listing
- No.	Title	Length
  1.	"Zlo"	2:03
  2.	"Privatni manijak"	3:01
  3.	"U glavi"	2:30
  4.	"Želim"	3:05
  5.	"Divlja"	2:44
  6.	"Glas"	2:50
  7.	"Sandra Meljničenko" (featuring Mimi Mercedez)	2:28
  8.	"Zar ne?"	2:59
  9.	"Tako hodam"	2:20
  10.	"Sudar"	3:08
  Total length:		27:11

=== Singles ===
==== As lead artist ====
Title	Year	Peak chart positions	Album
Title	Year	CRO Billb.	Album
"Zauvek"	2011	—	Non-album singles
"Ljubav je svuda" (as part of Moje 3)	2013	—	Non-album singles
"Ko je ovde ko"	2014	—	Non-album singles
"Mahovina"	2015	—	Non-album singles
"Probaj"	2016	—	Non-album singles
"Nemam vremena za to"	2017	—	Non-album singles
"Samo ti"	2017	—	Non-album singles
"Lava"	2018	—	Non-album singles
"Bez sna"	2019	—	Non-album singles
"Mili, mili"	2019	—	Non-album singles
"Kao nikada pre" (with Predrag Simić)	2020	—	Non-album singles
"Kaži mi"	2020	—	Non-album singles
"Varalica" (with Edita)	2021	—	Non-album singles
"Divlja"	2021	—	Bez kontrole
"On" (with Franka)	2021	—	Non-album singles
"Muškarčina"	2022	12	Non-album singles
"Zar ne"	2022	—	Bez kontrole
"U glavi"	2023	—	Bez kontrole
"Pokvariš mi san"	2025	—	Non-album singles
"El Dinero"	2025	—	Non-album singles
"—" denotes a recording that did not chart or was released before the chart was launched.

==== Promotional singles ====
Title	Year	Album
"Molio sam anđele" (with Tropico Band, Dženan Lončarević and Andrej Ilić)	2013	non-album singles
"Mahovina" (Live)	2016	non-album singles
"Ko je ovde ko" (Live)	2016	non-album singles
"Neko te ima"	2020	non-album singles
"Stupid Love" (Cover)	2021	non-album singles
"Bez sna" (2021)	2021	non-album singles

=== Other appearances ===
Title	Year	Other artist(s)	Album
"Ona"	2012	MCN	Ćelija 44
"Momenat"	2012	MCN	Ćelija 44
"Ti i ja"	2012	MCN	Ćelija 44
"Neka ti lice prekrije smeh"	2012	MCN	Ćelija 44
"Ujutru"	2015	Marko Mandić	Ramdagadam
"Manje više"	2016	Kiki Lesendrić, Piloti	Širom zatvorenih očiju
"Slatka mala" (Live)	2022	Jelena Karleuša	Jelena Karleuša: Music Week (Live)

== Filmography ==
=== Film ===
List of performances of Sara Jovanović in film
Year	Title	Role	Notes
2021	Space Jam: A New Legacy	Lola Bunny	Serbian synchronization

=== Television ===
List of performances of Sara Jovanović on television
Year	Title	Role	Notes
2012	Prvi glas Srbije	Herself	Contestant; 3rd place
2013	Beosong	Herself	Contestant as a part of Moje 3; winner
2013	Eurovision Song Contest	Herself	Contestant as a part of Moje 3; 11th place in the first semi-finals
2013	Tvoje lice zvuči poznato	Herself	Contestant; runner-up
2019	Sinđelići	Luna	Recurring role (7 episodes)
2020	JoJo na točkovima	Herself	Reality show
2022	Pesma za Evroviziju '22	Herself	Contestant; runner-up

== Awards and nominations ==
List of awards and nominations of Sara Jovanović
Year	Award	Category	Nominee/work	Result	Ref.
2013	Barbara Dex Award	Worst Dressed Act	Moje 3	Won	
2017	MTV Europe Music Awards	Best Adria Act	Herself	Nominated	
2018	MTS Vision Festival	Best Choreography	"Nemam vremena za to"	Won	
2019	Music Awards Ceremony	Alternative/Electropop Song of the Year	"Nemam vremena za to"	Nominated	
2019	Music Awards Ceremony	Music Video of the Year	"Lava"	Nominated	
2020	Music Awards Ceremony	Alternative Song of the Year	"Mili, mili"	Nominated	
2020	Music Awards Ceremony	Music Video of the Year	"Bez sna"	Nominated	
2020	Popularity Oscar in Banja Luka	Best Alternative Singer	Herself	Won	
2022	Pesma za Evroviziju		"Muškarčina"	2nd place	
2023	Music Awards Ceremony	Alternative Pop Song of the Year	"Zar ne"	Nominated	
2023	Music Awards Ceremony	Urban Pop Song of the Year	"Muškarčina"	Nominated	
2023	Music Awards Ceremony	Music Video of the Year	"Divlja"	Won	

Awards and achievements
Preceded by 2012: Željko Joksimović with "Nije ljubav stvar"	Serbia in the Eurovision Song Contest; 2013: Moje 3 with "Ljubav je svuda"	Succeeded by 2015: Bojana Stamenov with "Beauty Never Lies"
