= Plava krv =

2023 album by Devito

Studio album by Devito
- Released: 23 May 2023
- Genre: Turbo-folk
- Length: 60:00
- Language: Serbian
- Label: IDJTunes; City Records
- Producer: Marko Moreno; Aleksandar Sablić; Nikola Kirćanski Kei; Coby; Rimda; Juancla; Makala; Lord JKO; LTM; Memo; Boumidjal; Messud; Dvajedantri; Bogdan Stojiljkiović; Mike Ride

Devito chronology
Leden (2021)	Plava krv (2023)	Nema spavanja (2025)

Plava krv (transl. Blue Blood) is the debut album by Serbian musician Devito, released on 23 May 2023 through IDJTunes. It features 15 guest appearances from regional artists, which include Coby, Jala Brat, Buba Corelli, Breskvica, Voyage, Nucci, Relja Popović, Nikolija, and Teodora Džehverović. Released primarily on streaming services, the album was also released as a compact disc in an exclusive printing of 2,000 copies, distributed through City Records.

The release was also supposed to include Natti Natasha on the track "Acrobatico", which turned out to be a fraud by the author of the song, who misrepresented the female vocals as Natasha's.

== Commercial performance ==
Plava krva peaked in top-five on the album charts in Austria and Switzerland. It also placed seventh on the Spotify Top Albums Debut Global chart. Six tracks from the album: "Tu tu tu", "Vajbuje", "Htela je da zna", "Garava", "Rolex" and "Nina 2.0", simultaneously debuted on the Croatia Songs chart. "Tu tu tu" with Breskvica placed atop of the chart in its second week.

== Track listing ==
All tracks are written by David Ljubenović.

Plava krv track listing
No.	Title	Length
1.	"Koketa"	2:46
2.	"Koji kralj" (feat. Coby)	2:36
3.	"Mazna"	2:19
4.	"Vajbuje" (feat. Jala Brat and Buba Corelli)	1:57
5.	"Acrobatico"	2:51
6.	"Sami"	2:19
7.	"Vodi me" (feat. Teodora Džehverović)	2:20
8.	"Roli moj"	2:23
9.	"Garava" (feat. Voyage)	2:27
10.	"Blue Blood"	2:21
11.	"Htela je da zna" (feat. Relja)	2:46
12.	"Tu tu tu" (feat. Breskvica)	2:31
13.	"Nina 2.0"	2:19
14.	"Svemir" (feat. Inas)	2:45
15.	"Omerta"	2:42
16.	"Ama lome me" (feat. Nikolija)	2:22
17.	"Jedna mala" (feat. Leške)	2:14
18.	"Rolex" (feat. Crni Cerak)	2:21
19.	"Geto riba"	2:28
20.	"Daytona" (feat. Nucci)	2:27
21.	"Top" (feat. Šolaja)	2:13
22.	"Boema" (feat. Mike Ride)	2:42
23.	"Valentina" (feat. Corona)	2:19
24.	"Plava krv"	3:10
Total length:		60:00

== Charts ==
Chart performance for Plava krv
Chart (2023)	Peak position
Austrian Albums (Ö3 Austria)	2
Swiss Albums (Schweizer Hitparade)	5

== Release history ==
Release history for Plava krv
Region	Date	Format	Label
Various	23 May 2023	Digital download; streaming	IDJTunes
Serbia	23 May 2023	CD	City Records
