= Ti i Ja =

"Ti i ja"
- Official 2023 Music Awards Ceremony live performance artwork

Single by Saša Matić featuring Jelena Rozga

from the album Dva života
- Released: 15 December 2021
- Recorded: June 2020
- Genre: Pop
- Length: 3:37
- Label: SM Music-1
- Songwriter: Milan Miletić
- Producer: Saša Matić

Saša Matić singles chronology
"Kad prođe sve" (2021)	"Ti i ja" (2021)	"Dva života" (2021)

Jelena Rozga singles chronology
"Kad nema ljubavi" (2020)	"Ti i ja" (2021)	"Samo se ljubit' isplati" (2022)

Music video
- "Ti i Ja" on YouTube

"'Ti i ja" (English: You and I) is a song by Serbian pop-folk singer Saša Matić and Croatian pop singer Jelena Rozga, included on the former's album Dva života (2021). The pop ballad was written by Milan Miletić and produced by Matić. Saša Nikolić served as the music writer and was responsible for the arrangement. It was released as a single on 15 December 2021 through record label SM Music-1. The song was well-received by music critics who praised the singers for their emotional rendition. Commercially, the song achieved success in Croatia and the former Yugoslav countries, peaking at number nine on the Croatia Songs chart for the week ending 19 February 2022.

The music video for the song, directed by Toxic Entertainment and released on 15 December 2021 is watched more than 15.9 million times on the video streaming platform YouTube as of March 2024. The duo performed the song live on several televised appearances, including on Ami G Show, during a promotional concert at the Esplanade Zagreb Hotel, the 2023 Music Awards Ceremony and later during their separate concert performances and gigs.

== Background and reception ==
"Ti i ja" was included on Matić's tenth studio album Dva života (2021). It was written by Milan Miletić and produced by Matić. The song marks the first collaboration between the two singers; talks about a collaboration had been going on for six to seven years, however, both singers were waiting patiently for the right song. Matić as the writer of the song sent a demo to Rozga in June 2020; immediately after hearing it, Rozga became emotional. While recording, the singer wanted to be alone to be able to emotionally render the song. The song was released as a single from the album on 15 December 2021.

Upon its release, the song was well-received by listeners and a writer of Story.hr dubbed it a "real music pleasure" for the singers' fanbases. It was nominated in the category for Best Collaboration at the 2023 Music Awards Ceremony, which it also won.

== Music video ==
A music video for the song, directed by Toxic Entertainment was released on 15 December 2021. A brief teaser of the video was released online on 13 December 2021. The video opens with footage of Matić playing the opening notes of the song on his piano along with a "powered by" Admiral Bet icon. It goes on to show Rozga, whose face is seen on the mirror next to him, singing as a wine glass falls and gets spilled. The video then shows both Rozga and Matić singing the song to the camera next to a river in Belgrade where they are also surrounded by a piano and adornments. The second half of the video proceeds to shots of the two singers singing the song on an empty boat in an evening setting. The final scenes, show the duo singing the song while seated and facing each other, while flames can be seen on the lit candles behind them. After its release, the video became trending in all post-Yugoslav countries and garnered 1.5 million views only 3 days after its release. As of March 2024, it is watched more than 15.9 million times on the platform.

== Live performances ==
The duo performed the songs several times on televised appearances. On 19 January 2022, during a guest appearance on Ami G Show, Matić and Rozga sang the duet in a piano version only. The live performance video has over 221.000 views as of March 2024. On 15 February 2022, the two appeared in Zagreb and sang the duet live during a promotional gathering for the album at Esplanade Zagreb Hotel. On 1 May 2022, Matić appeared together with Sanja Vučić on the Serbian talent show Nikad nije kasno where he performed the song in the 33rd episode. On 25 January 2023, the duo appeared together at the 2023 Music Awards Ceremony where they performed "Ti i ja" live together. As of March 2024, the live performance video has more than 376.000 views on YouTube. Matić performed "Ti i ja" live as the 43rd song during his solo concert on 8 March 2023 at the Štark Arena with Rozga's part being sung by a vocalist while a duo appeared on stage performing a dance choreography. A filmed video of the performance was also broadcast to Radio Television of Serbia and released to YouTube on 10 March 2023. An audio of the live performance of the song was uploaded to YouTube on 2 April 2024.

A cover version was performed by Rozga together with Serbian singer Valentino during one of her gigs in July 2022. The YouTube short has more than 65.000 views as of 2024.

== Charts ==
For the week ending 19 February 2022, the single debuted at number nine on the Billboard Croatia Songs chart which later also became its peak position. It stayed on the same position the following week. In its third week on the chart, on 3 March 2022, the song fell to a position of number 12. In the following weeks, it could still be seen on the chart at positions 16 on 12 March and 21 on 19 March, which was also its fifth and last week in the top 25.

As "Ti i Ja" was released through a Serbian record label, it was not eligible to chart on the HR Top 40. However, it charted at number 93 on the Airplay Radio Chart on 7 March 2022.

Chart performance for "Ti i Ja"
Chart (2022)	Peak position
Croatia (Billboard)	9

== Credits and personnel ==
Credits are taken from the description of the official music video on YouTube.

Song credits

- Music, arrangement: Saša Nikolić
- Lyrics: Milan Miletić

Video

- Make-up: Brana Kostić
- Hairdresser: Salon Franic Zagreb
- Clothing: ENVY
- Video production: Toxic Entertainment
