= Banatsko Novo Selo =

Banatsko Novo Selo Банатско Ново Село (Serbian) Satu Nou (Romanian)
- Village (Selo)
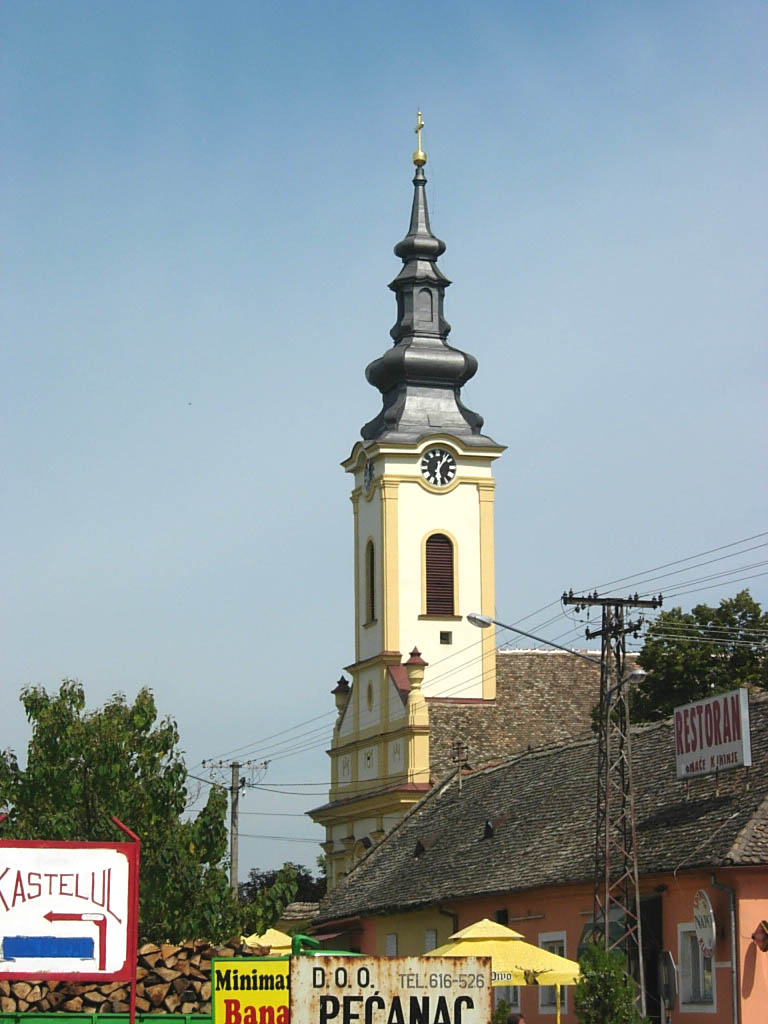

- Location of Banatsko Novo Selo within Vojvodina Banatsko Novo Selo (Serbia) Banatsko Novo Selo (Europe)
- Coordinates: 44°59′23″N 20°47′01″E
- Country: Serbia
- Province: Vojvodina
- District: South Banat
- Municipality: Pančevo

Area
  - Total: 98.95 km^{2} (38.20 sq mi)
- Elevation: 105 m (344 ft)

Population (2022)
  - Total: 5,806
  - Density: 58.68/km^{2} (152.0/sq mi)
- Time zone: UTC+1 (CET)
  - Summer (DST): UTC+2 (CEST)
- Postal code: 26314
- Area code: +381(0)13
- Car plates: PA

Banatsko Novo Selo (Serbian Cyrillic: Банатско Ново Село; Romanian: Satu Nou) is a village located in the municipality of Pančevo, South Banat District, Vojvodina, Serbia. The village has a Serb ethnic majority and a notable Romanian minority, with the village's population numbering 5.806 people (2022 census).

== Name ==
The Serbian place name of the village is Banatsko Novo Selo and means Banatian New Village, but it has previously also been known by different names throughout its history. Older Serbian name of the village was simply Novo Selo, while in German it has been known as Banater Neudorf, in Hungarian it has been known as Révújfalu and in Romanian it has been known as Satu Nou, a name still announced on entry and exit signs along the highway due to the large Romanian ethnic minority in the town.

== Geography ==
Banatsko Novo Selo is located on flat and fertile plains at 44°59′23″N 20°47′01″E, approximately 18 km NE of Pančevo and 37 km NE of Pančevo bridge to Belgrade.The altitude above sea level is roughly about 105 meters or 347 feet. It is located within the South Banat District, in the Province of Vojvodina, which is in the northern part of Serbia.

The largest town nearby the village is Pančevo, but the region is also scattered with other inhabited places, similar in size with Banatsko Novo Selo, such as Kačarevo and Dolovo. The village is also on the main thoroughfare between the capital city Belgrade and Romania.

== History ==
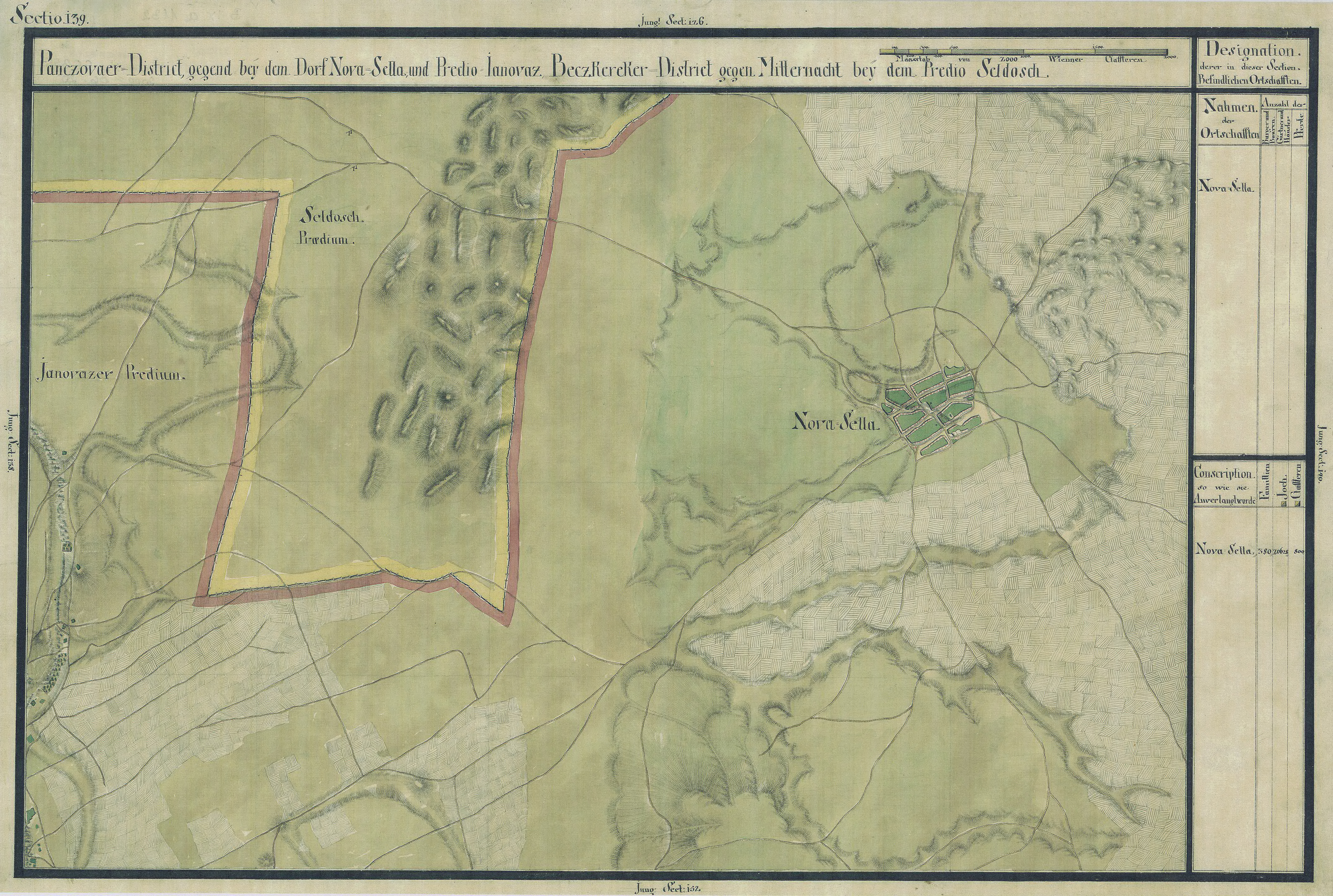
National Archives of Austria, Map of the Josephinian Land Survey (1769–1772)

The village was founded in 1765. It was settled by Rascians and Vlachs. The settlement was a part of Habsburg's military frontier (Austrian Empire) since its founding, then it belonged to the Torontál county of Austria-Hungary. After World War I, that area was a part of provisional Torontalsko-tamiške županja (Treaty of Trianon), in 1922 of Belgrade oblast and since 1929 of the Danube Banovina in the Kingdom of Yugoslavia. In the time after World War II its belonged to the Srez Pančevo of the Socialist Federal Republic of Yugoslavia and of the Federal Republic of Yugoslavia. The communal area of Banatsko Novo Selo was a part of the municipal region of Pančevo from all these centuries to the present.

There is an impression of the old village which is recorded on the map of the Franciscan land survey from the early 19th century at the National Archives of Austria. In 1906, cadastral maps of the village were recorded which are located at the National Archives of Hungary.

=== Demographic history ===
In 1921, about 80 percent of the population of the village were ethnic Romanians. In 2002, the Romanian minority numbered 2,036 people (27.7%).

Historical population
Year	Pop.	±%
1890	7,391	—
1948	6,129	−17.1%
1953	6,378	+4.1%
1961	7,225	+13.3%
1971	7,872	+9.0%
1981	7,963	+1.2%
1991	7,987	+0.3%
2002	7,345	−8.0%
2011	6,686	−9.0%
2022	5,806	−13.2%

== Economy ==
The main occupation of the villages people is in agriculture. However, an increasing number of community members are establishing small and medium size enterprises, particularly in agricultural processing.

== Culture ==
Since 1958, there is a cultural center Dom kulture 3 oktobar in the village. In 1998, Romanian people have formed the association KUD Dr Radu Flora.

== See also ==
- List of places in Serbia
- List of cities, towns and villages in Vojvodina

== Gallery ==
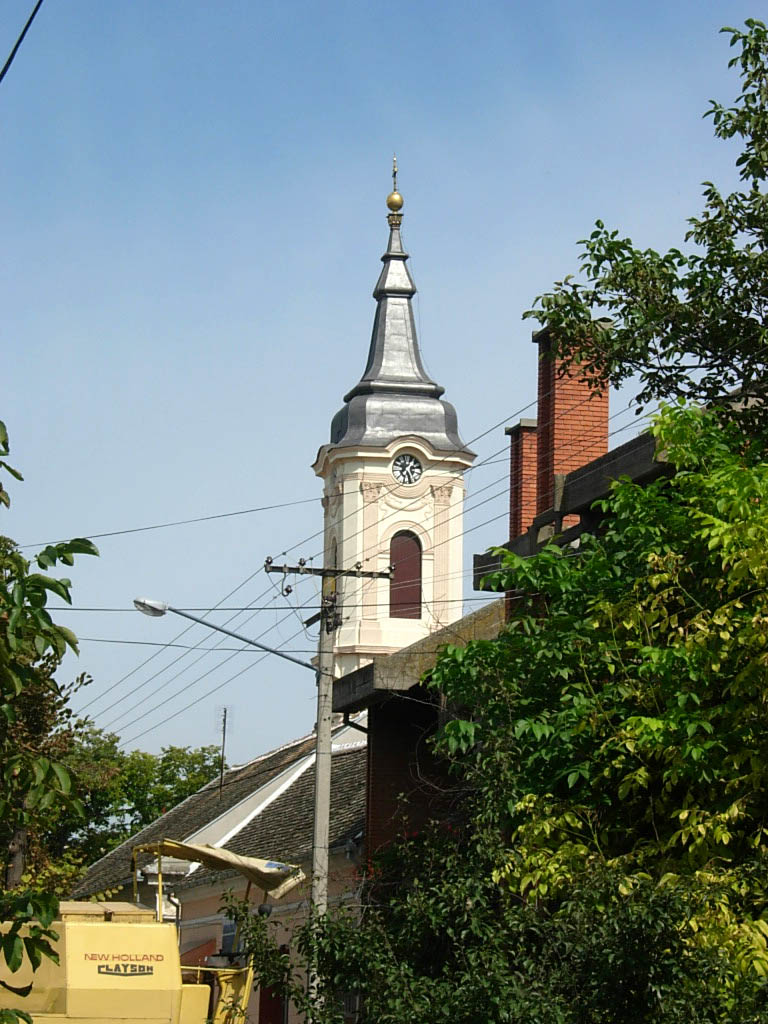
Bell tower of the Serbian Orthodox Church Holy Trinity

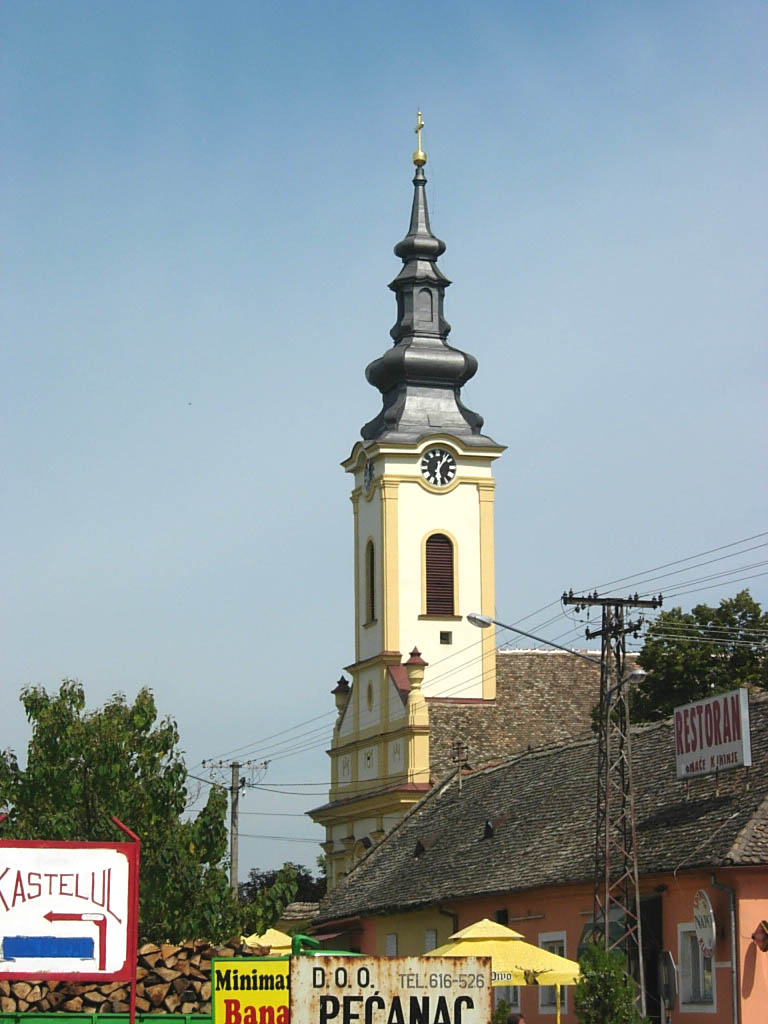
Bell tower of the Romanian Orthodox Church Holy Spirit
