= Frka u svemiru =

Studio album by Mimi Mercedez
- Released: 17 February 2023
- Genre: Hip hop
- Length: 31:35
- Language: Serbian
- Label: Universal Music Serbia
- Producer: Zartical; NSS; Pumpgang; Nikola Kamenović

Mimi Mercedez chronology
Geto Gerila (2019)	Frka u svemiru (2023)

Singles from Za Tebe
- 1. "Dajivé Komì" Released: 9 September 2022; 2. "Ratatata" Released: 21 October 2022; 3. "Tik Tak" Released: 25 November 2022; 4. "Simp" Released: 3 February 2023

Frka u svemiru (transl. Trouble In Space) is the fifth studio album by Serbian rapper Mimi Mercedez. It was released digitally on 17 February 2023 through Universal Music Serbia. The album was preceded by four singles: "Dajivé Komì", "Ratatata", "Tik Tak" and "Simp". Frka u svemiru features guest appearances by Serbian rappers Povlo, Seksi, Marlon Brutal, Mili and Žakila. The production on most of the tracks from the album was handled by Žarko Krstić Zartical, who is a longtime music partner of Mercedez.

The album's title and cover art reference the August 2005 cover of the Serbian Playboy featuring singer Svetlana Ceca Ražnatović.

== Critical reception ==
Professional ratings
Review scores
Source	Rating
Muzika.hr	3/5 stars

In a three out of five star review, Kristina Kolar from Muzika.hr highlighted the production on the album with the respect to previous releases of Mimi Mercedez. Furthermore, Kolar was favorable of the overall lyricism on Frka u svemiru, citing Mercedez as the "chronicler of chaos" of the Belgrade underground. However, Kolar concluded that the motives and topics covered in the album had already been covered by Mercedez in her previous work, and in a more exciting manner than in Frka u svemiru.

The album's lead single "Dajivé Komì" featuring Seksi was among twelve songs in consideration for the 2023 Milan Mladenović Award.

== Track listing ==
Credits adapted from Spotify.

All tracks are written by Milena Janković.

Frka u svemiru
No.	Title	Writer(s)	Producer(s)	Length
1.	"Miševi"	Stefan Zungu Jovanović	Stefan Zungu Jovanović	3:30
2.	"Loš lik"	Filip Petković; Ilija Perović	NSS; Pumpgang	3:36
3.	"Klan" (feat. Povlo)	Nikola Kamenović; Vladislav Ratković	Nikola Kamenović	3:56
4.	"Dajivé Komì" (feat. Seksi)	Relja Despotović; Žarko Krstić	Zartical	2:35
5.	"Ratatata" (feat. Marlon Brutal)	Vukašin Jasnić; Žarko Krstić	Zartical	2:10
6.	"Nismo ista priča"	Žarko Krstić	Zartical	2:38
7.	"Tik Tak" (feat. Mili)	Marko Milivojev; Žarko Krstić	Zartical	2:40
8.	"Simp"	Žarko Krstić	Zartical	2:15
9.	"Samo da osetim bas"	Žarko Krstić	Zartical	2:14
10.	"Baš jak" (feat. Žakila)	Žarko Krstić; Žarko Ćurak	Zartical	2:40
11.	"Bog i batina" (feat. Fox)	Branko Kljajić; Žarko Krstić	Zartical	3:17
Total length:				31:35
