= Devito (rapper) =

Serbian rapper (born 1995)

Devito Девито
- Born: David Ljubenović; 9 May 1995 (age 31); Kragujevac, Serbia, FR Yugoslavia
- Genres: Trap; Serbian hip hop
- Occupations: Rapper; music video director; photographer; singer; songwriter
- Instruments: Vocals
- Years active: 2018–present
- Labels: IDJTunes; Bassivity Digital

David Ljubenović (Serbian Cyrillic: Давид Љубеновић; born 9 May 1995), professionally known as Devito (Serbian Cyrillic: Девито), is a Serbian rapper. Originally working as a photographer and music video director, he made his official recording debut in 2018. Devito is well-known for wearing a white three-hole balaclava in public to hide his true identity. He has released two studio albums - Plava krv (2023) and Nema spavanja (2025).

== Life and career ==
=== Early life and career beginnings ===
David Ljubenović was born in Kragujevac, Federal Republic of Yugoslavia on 9 May 1995. He started making music in primary school. After turning 18, Ljubenović became a professional photographer. Subsequently, after moving to Belgrade, he started directing music videos under production company DaVideo and has since worked for regional artists such as Aca Lukas, Milica Pavlović, MC Stojan, Ana Kokić, Sandra Afrika, and Vuk Mob.

=== Recording career ===
In March 2018, Ljubenović released his debut single under the stage name Devito, titled "Alal vera", featuring Leon. In June the following year, his first major label single, "Barbie", was released under Bassivity Digital and IDJTunes. With the release of "Uh" in June 2019, he gained more significant popularity and media attention, as the music video for the song has collected over 30 million views on YouTube. In February 2020, Devito released "Koka" for the soundtrack of the Serbian television series South Wind. Subsequently, in June, he collaborated with Teodora Džehverović on "Vudu". The single has amassed over 12 million streams on Spotify and over 100 million views on YouTube, making it the commercially the biggest release by a Serbian artist of that year.

Devito released "Mame mi" in March 2021 for the purposes of the film sequel to South Wind, called South Wind 2: Ubrzanje. In September 2021, Devito held his first solo concert during the Belgrade Music Week festival. In October 2021, he was chosen by Tuborg Open to be featured on the remix of "Get Together" by David Guetta. It was followed by his debut EP, titled Leden, which was released on 12 November under IDJTunes. In December, IDJ TV enlisted Devito as the most streamed Serbian artist on Spotify of 2021.

His debut album, Plava krv, was released on 23 May 2023 under IDJTunes. It charted second in Austria, fifth in Switzerland, and seventh on the Spotify Top Albums Debut Global chart. With over 200 million listenings across all platforms in three months, Plava krv was declared the commercially most successful album by a Serbian singer in 2023. On 11 June 2025, Devito released his second album, Nema spavanja. The album received praise for its "focused, cohesive, and refreshing" approach to trap and club music with synthpop-influenced sound and more intimate and personal song writing. Nema spavanja spawned hit songs like "Ego", "Amsterdam" and "35°C". In November, he collaborated with rock band Bajaga i Instruktori on the single "Astronaut".

== Public image ==
Devito is known recognized for wearing a white balaclava in his public appearances. In the 2021 interview with Noizz, he stated that the reason behind it is so that his audience can connect better with his lyrics and music, further explaining: "Regardless of who and what you are, you can live your dreams, if you are ready to fight for them of course". At the beginning of 2023, Devito showed his open public support for the LGBT community in Serbia after he had been accused by rapper Mili of being a closeted gay man.

On 5 October 2023, it was reported he got married.

== Discography ==
=== Studio albums ===
Title	Details	Peak chart positions	
Title	Details	AUT	SUI
Plava krv	Released: 23 May 2023; Label: IDJTunes; Format: CD, digital download, streaming	2	5
Nema spavanja	Released: 11 June 2025; Label: DA Production; Format: CD, digital download, streaming	49	—

=== Singles ===
Title	Year	Peak chart positions	
Title	Year	AUT	CRO Billb.
"Barbie"	2019	—	*
"Lila"	2019	—	*
"Uh"	2019	—	*
"Aligatori"	2019	—	*
"Oduzet"	2019	—	*
"Magičan cvet"	2020	—	*
"Bebe"	2020	—	*
"Koka"	2020	—	*
"Taj flex"	2020	—	*
"Vudu" (with Teodora)	2020	—	*
"Austria" (with Mike Ride)	2020	—	*
"Offline" (with Relja)	2020	—	*
"Nina"	2021	—	*
"Durg Like This" (with The Eurotrip!)	2021	—	*
"Mame mi"	2021	—	*
"Ju"	2021	—	*
"Telo"	2021	—	*
"Mami"	2021	—	*
"Rame" (with Mike Ride)	2021	—	*
"Drip drip" (with Corona)	2021	—	*
"Roze" (with Jala Brat and Buba Corelli)	2021	60	*
"Verna"	2022	—	—
"Do zore" (with Relja)	2022	—	—
"Omađijala" (with Relja)	2022	—	2
"Marina"	2022	—	—
"Ljubav" (with Nikolija)	2022	—	—
"Niko neće" (with JMTradee)	2022	—	—
"25 milja" (with Igor Buzov)	2022	—	—
"Shake It" (with Jala Brat)	2022	—	5
"Karamela" (with Jala Brat and Buba Corelli)	2023	23	2
"Mili mili"	2023	—	—
"Mafia" (with Voyage)	2023	66	6
"Ola ola" (with Relja)	2023	—	—
"Nepogrešivo" (with Jelena Karleuša featuring DJ Hamida)	2023	—	—
"Nenormalan lik" (with Nikolija)	2024	—	3
"Cinema" (with Teodora)	2024	—	—
"Fantasia" (with Olexesh)	2024	—	—
"Hi hi – ha ha" (with Nucci and Biba)	2024	—	—
"Brat moj" (with Kalash Criminel)	2025	—	—
"Score"	2025	—	—
"Astronaut" (with Bajaga)	2025	—	—
"Supersonic" (with Joker Out)	2026	—	—
"Uspori dečače" (with Nadia)	2026	—	—
"RocknRolla"	2026	—	1

=== Other charted songs ===
Title	Year	Peak chart positions		Album
Title	Year	AUT	CRO Billb.	Album
"Tu Tu Tu" (with Breskvica)	2023	21	1	Plava krv
"Garava" (with Voyage)	2023	72	3	Plava krv
"Vajbuje" (with Jala Brat and Buba Corelli)	2023	—	5	Plava krv
"Rolex" (with Crni Cerak)	2023	—	6	Plava krv
"Svemir" (with Inas)	2023	—	5	Plava krv
"Htjela je da zna" (with Relja)	2023	—	8	Plava krv
"Koji kralj" (with Coby)	2023	—	20	Plava krv
"Vodi me" (with Teodora)	2023	—	25	Plava krv
"Nina 2.0"	2023	—	12	Plava krv
"Koketa"	2023	—	14	Plava krv
"Mazna"	2023	—	19	Plava krv

== Awards and nominations ==
List of awards and nominations of Devito
Year	Award	Category	Nominee/work	Result	Ref.
2023	Music Awards Ceremony	Male Trap Song of the Year	"Marina"	Won	
2023	Music Awards Ceremony	Drill Song of the Year	"Leden"	Nominated	
2023	Music Awards Ceremony	New Age Collaboration of the Year	"Omađijala" (feat. Relja)	Nominated	
2023	Music Awards Ceremony	Contribution to Regional Music	Himself	Won	
