= Kačarevo =

Kačarevo Качарево
- Village (Selo)
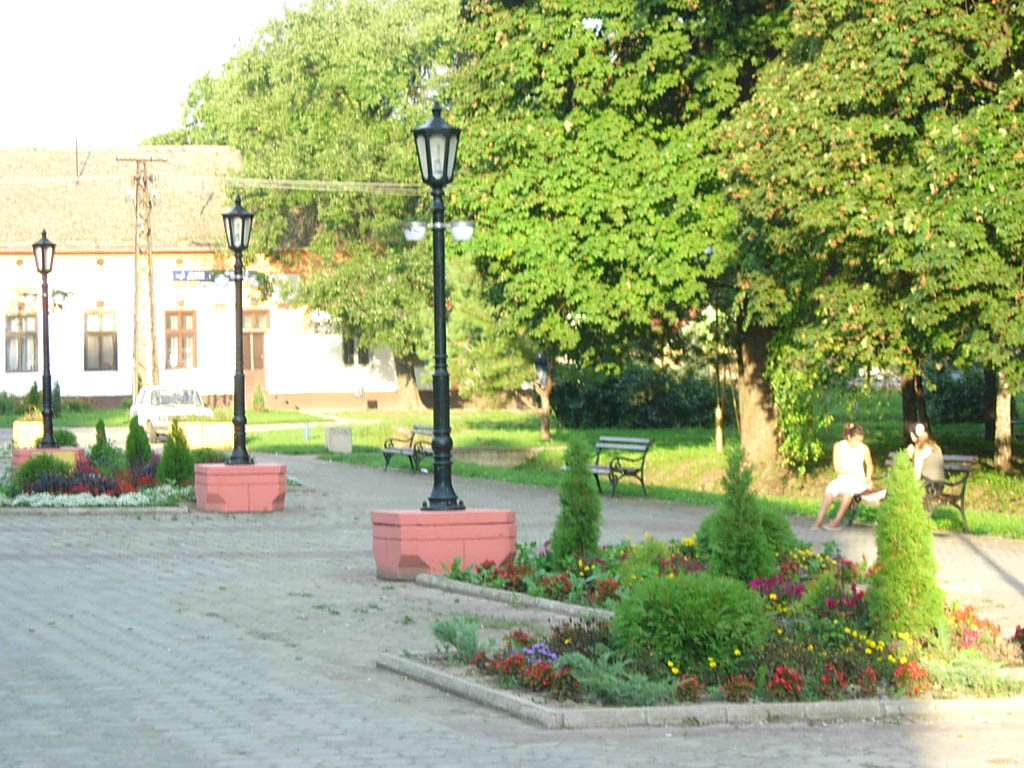
- Centre of the town

- Location of Kačarevo within Serbia Kačarevo (Serbia) Kačarevo (Europe)
- Coordinates: 44°57′35″N 20°41′22″E
- Country: Serbia
- Province: Vojvodina
- District: South Banat
- Municipality: Pančevo

Area
  - Kačarevo: 39.71 km^{2} (15.33 sq mi)
- Elevation: 80 m (260 ft)

Population (2022)
  - Kačarevo: 6,346
  - Density: 159.8/km^{2} (413.9/sq mi)
- Time zone: UTC+1 (CET)
  - Summer (DST): UTC+2 (CEST)
- Postal code: 26212
- Area code: +381(0)13
- Car plates: PA

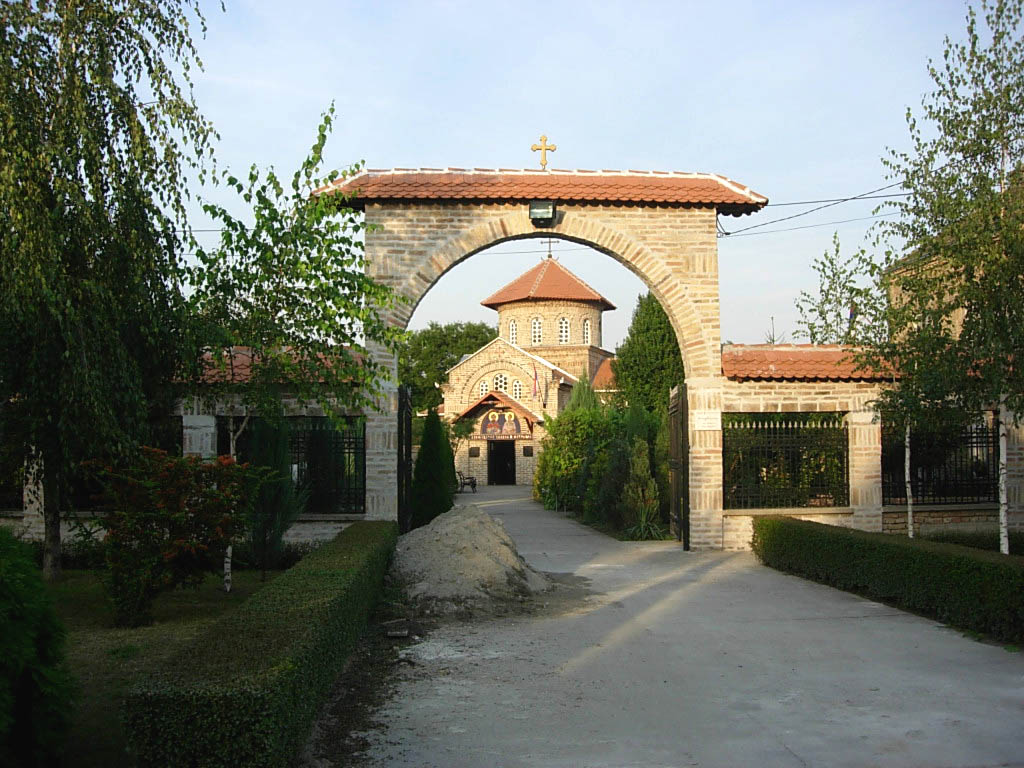
Orthodox church Saints Cyril and Methodius

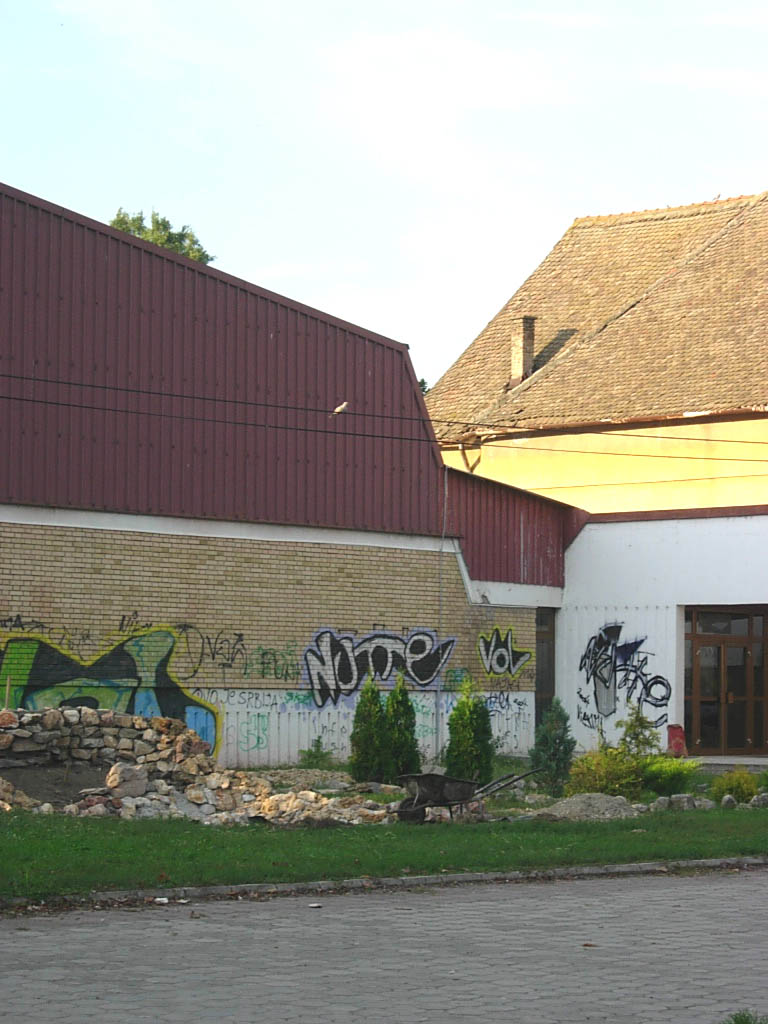
Sports centre in Kačarevo.

Kačarevo (Serbian and Macedonian: Качарево) is a village in northern Serbia, situated in the municipality of Pančevo, South Banat District, Vojvodina province. The village has a Serb ethnic majority and its population numbered 6,346 people (2022 census).

== Name ==
The former German place name (Franzfeld) means Francis' field in honor of Francis II. The Hungarian name (official name Ferenchalom from 1898 to 1918) meant the Francis' heap.

After World War I, the settlement was officially renamed Kraljevićevo (Краљевићево) and that name meant prince's location in honor of the Karađorđević dynasty. In 1946, the settlement was officially renamed Kačarevo (Качарево) in honor of Svetozar Kačar who died in March 1944.

== Geography ==
Kačarevo is located on flat and fertile plains at 44°57′59″N 20°41′22″E, approximately 16 km NE of Pančevo and 32 km NE of the Pančevo bridge to Belgrade. It is located within the South Banat District, in the Autonomous Province of Vojvodina, which is in the northern part of Serbia.

The largest neighbouring settlement is indeed Pančevo, but the region is also scattered with other smaller inhabited places, similar in size with Kačarevo, such as Banatsko Novo Selo and Jabuka.

The altitude above sea level is roughly about 81 meters, or 265 feet.

== History ==
There is a deed of founding from 1791 signed by Leopold II. The town was built up in 1792 by German settlers, almost all of them were Protestants. The town is one of the youngest settlements in the administrative Region of Pančevo.

The settlement was a part of Habsburg's military frontier (Austrian Empire) since its founding, then it belonged to the Torontál county of Austria-Hungary. After World War I, that area was a part of provisional Torontalsko-tamiške županja (Treaty of Trianon), in 1922 of Belgrade oblast and since 1929 of the Danube Banovina in the Kingdom of Yugoslavia. In the time after World War II its belonged to the Srez Pančevo of the Socialist Federal Republic of Yugoslavia and of the Federal Republic of Yugoslavia. The communal area of Kačarevo was a part of the municipal region of Pančevo from all these centuries to the present.

=== Demographic history ===
From 1792 to 1945, it was mostly populated by Germans, and some Hungarians and Romanians lived there as well. In 1921, the population numbered 4,450 inhabitants, including 4,333 Germans, 63 Hungarians, 39 Romanians, 3 Czechs or Slovaks and 2 Slovenes. In 1944, after the defeat of Axis powers (World War II in Yugoslavia), one part of German population left from the region, together with defeated German army. The remaining Germans were sent after local imprisonment to internment camp in Knićanin that existed until 1948. After prison camps were dissolved (in 1948), the remaining German population left Yugoslavia because of economic reasons. In the first time period after World War II the village was settled with families that originated from all parts of Yugoslavia.

The number of reported inhabitants of the town in 2002 was 7,624. The majority of inhabitants were ethnic Serbs (5,042 or 66.13%), while Macedonians form 19.24% of the population or 1,467 people.

Historical population
Year	Pop.	±%
1961	7,792	—
1971	8,088	+3.8%
1981	8,309	+2.7%
1991	8,103	−2.5%
2002	7,624	−5.9%

== Economy ==
The main occupation of the towns' people is in agriculture, as with many other local settlements. However, many of the towns’ inhabitants also work in the factories of the neighbouring city of Pančevo.

== Culture and Tourism ==
Since 1960, there is a cultural center (Dom kulture) in Kačarevo. The town is famous for its bacon festival known as Slaninijada (slanina means bacon), which is organised by the Tourist Association. The festival was organised for the first time in 1988 and runs on an annual basis during February. For several years, there is the vocal group Toše Proeski which is very well known in the Vojvodina.

=== Kačarevo Lake ===
One of the main attractions in the settlement is the artificial Kačarevo Lake (Serbian: Качаревачко језеро). Kačarevo is the only settlement in the area that has no natural body or stream of water (river, canal, pond, bog). The lake is situated 1 km (0.62 mi) southeast of the center of Kačarevo on the location of the former cattle cemetery, colloquially called the "horse graveyard". The denizens organized themselves and from 2007 began cleaning the area from the underbrush while the digging of the lake itself began in 2011. The surrounding area was adapted into the square green oasis with the forested alleys of pines, firs and deciduous trees. The benches and tables are placed between the trees. There are lawns with the rose seedlings, gazebos and a pheasant farm within the complex.

The lake itself has a fountain which constantly pours the fresh water into the lake, a springboard, the showers, sunbeds, parasols and a lifeguard service. The lake was renovated in 2015 when the protective foil on the lakebed was replaced and part of the bed was concreted. Using the reduced number of visitors due to the COVID-19 pandemic, the lake was again concreted and the foil was replaced in 2020, while the banks were re-arranged in 2021. Since 2013, the artistic festival "Ludus Fest" has been held along the lake.

The lake covers an area of 0.4 hectares (0.99 acres).

== Sports ==
There is a football club named FK Jedinstvo Stević in the town, founded in 1947 and its club color is blue and the dress is violet. Since 2003, there is a second club named KMF Kraljevićevo. Since 1972, there is a basketball club named KK Jedinstvo Kačarevo.

== See also ==
- List of places in Serbia
- List of cities, towns and villages in Vojvodina

== Sources ==
- Slobodan Ćurčić, Broj stanovnika Vojvodine, Novi Sad, 1996.
