= Samo se ljubit' isplati =

- iTunes digital single cover

Single by Jelena Rozga
- Released: 11 November 2022
- Recorded: 2022
- Genre: Pop
- Length: 3:25
- Label: Croatia Records
- Songwriter: Vjekoslava Huljić
- Producer: Tonči Huljić

Jelena Rozga singles chronology
"Grizem" (2022)	"Samo se ljubit' isplati" (2022)	"Idi Ti" (2023)

Music video
- "Samo se ljubit' isplati" on YouTube

"Samo se ljubit' isplati" (English: Loving Is the Only Thing that Is Worth) is a song by Croatian pop singer Jelena Rozga. The song was written by Vjekoslava Huljić and produced by Tonči Huljić. Rozga presented the song on Croatian radio channel Radio Dalmacija on 3 November 2022. "Samo se ljubit' isplati" was released as a single on 11 November 2022. "Samo se ljubit' isplati" is a warm uptempo song which is reminiscent of the singer's sound during her years with the group Magazin. Upon its release, it received positive comments from the singer's fanbase. The single was commercially successful, peaking at number four on the Croatian HR Top 40 chart for the week ending 14 November 2022.

An accompanying music video produced by the Sestrice production company and directed by Luka Sepčić was released along with the song on 11 November 2022. The video portrays Rozga in three different phases of her life, as a child, a young girl and a mature woman. She is shown with a partner in the latter two stages and the two eventually meet in front of her house. The video was well received by the singer's fans and garnered more than 80.000 views on YouTube in the first day after its premiere. The singer performed it live at the talent show Zvijezde pjevaju on 20 November 2022.

== Background ==
On 19 May 2022, Rozga appeared on narodni's Living Room Acoustic show where she announced her plans to release a new song before her performance at the Fusion World Music Festival on 19 July 2022. The song was nevertheless not released before the performance and Rozga continued promoting her upcoming acoustic studio album Minut Srca Mog (2022). On 3 November 2022, during her appearance at the show "Dobar dan Dalmacijo" with Radio Dalmacija, Rozga presented the song titled "Samo se ljubit' isplati" and announced a music video. The song was intended to remind listeners to her musical style during the time she served as the lead singer of Magazin. The song was written by Vjekoslava Huljić and produced by Tonči Huljić. On 9 November 2022, through a post on her Instagram account, Rozga explained the concept behind the song: "Through the years I have left behind me, I learnt a lot. I learnt that the prize for the effort comes sooner or later, I learnt that one should not worry about unnecessary things, but I also learnt that love is the only thing worth fighting for. 'Love is the only thing that is worth' is not only the name of the new song, but also the motto with which I live and a principle I do not give up on."

"Samo se ljubit' isplati" is an uptempo song that "radiates with positive energy". The song received mostly positive comments from listeners upon its release. In December 2022, the song won the Cesarica Award in the category Hit of December.

== Music video ==
On 9 November, the singer announced through a post on her official Instagram channel that the music video for "Samo se ljubit' isplati" would be released on 11 November. On 11 November, the accompanying video for the song premiered on the singer's official YouTube channel. The music video was directed by Luka Sepčić from the SESTRICE production company. Ana Badurina served as the video's producer. Rozga's love interest in the video is played by Croatian actor Matko Knešaurek.

The clip for the song demonstrates highlights of the singer's life as she is portrayed as a child, a young girl and a mature woman. The video opens with a young girl standing on a bed, singing on a hair comb. Scenes showing a young pair of parents cooking and dancing together in the kitchen while their young daughter is observing them are shown next. The child grows up to become a young girl who is quickly joined by a red-haired boyfriend; together they are seen dancing in front of neighborhood houses. Interspersed in the video are scenes of current Rozga, being in the places of the young characters, reminiscing of her childhood and adolescence. She is dressed in a light brown coat lip-syncing the lyrics of the song. In-between, the video shows a man appearing in the neighborhood, asking people around, looking for Rozga. The clip ends with Rozga and the man meeting in front of her house; he approaches her and starts caressing her hair.

The music video was praised by a writer from CroModa who felt that it "exudes warmth". Additionally, the initial reaction from the singer's audience was predominantly positive.

== Live performances ==
On 20 November 2022, Jelena Rozga appeared at the final evening of the Croatian talent show Zvijezde pjevaju where she performed "Samo se ljubit' isplati" live for the first time. The song was included on the set list of the singer's regional Minut Srca Mog Tour (2022–23), where it was performed at the end of the concert together with "Minut' srca tvog". In January 2023, Rozga appeared at the awards show Cesarica where she performed "Samo se ljubit' isplati" live.

== Credits and personnel ==
Credits for the song are taken from the YouTube description of the music video.

- Music: Tonči Huljić
- Lyrics: Vjekoslava Huljić
- Arrangement: Tonči Huljić, Leo Škaro
- Mixing and mastering: Tomislav Mrduljaš

== Charts ==
For the week ending 14 November 2022, "Samo se ljubit' isplati" debuted at number four on the Croatian HR Top 40, which marked the highest new entry on the chart. The next week, the single remained at the same position. In its third week on the chart, the single moved to its new peak position of 3 for the week ending 28 November 2022.

Chart performance for "Samo se ljubit' isplati"
Chart (2022)	Peak position
Croatia (HR Top 40)	3
