= Relja =

Relja is a South Slavic masculine given name.

Notable people with the name include:

- Relja the Winged, a character in Serbian epic poetry modeled after Hrelja, a 14th-century protosebastos
- Relja Bašić (1930–2017), Croatian actor
- Relja Dulić Fišer (born 1975), Serbian tennis player
- Relja Penezić (born 1950), Serbian American painter
- Relja Popović (born 1989), Serbian musician and actor
