= Zera (musician) =

Serbian singer and rapper (born 2002)

Zera Зера
- Born: Marina Pezerović; 16 December 2002 (age 23); Vorarlberg, Austria
- Genres: Pop; trap
- Occupations: Singer; rapper; songwriter
- Years active: 2021–present
- Label: Generacija Zed

Marina Pezerović (Serbian Cyrillic: Марина Пезеровић; born 16 December 2002), better known by her stage name Zera (Serbian Cyrillic: Зера), is a Serbian-Austrian singer, rapper and songwriter.

== Life and career ==
Pezerović was born on 16 December 2002, in Vorarlberg, Austria, to Serb parents from Novi Sad. She began exploring her interest in music from an early age by playing the piano and guitar. Pezerović graduated from the music school in Dornbirn and often performed at festivals as an opening act. By recording and uploading covers to Instagram, she was noticed by Marko Panić Maleni in front of the Belgrade-based digital label Generacija Zed, whom Zera subsequently began collaborating with after she had turned eighteen.

Zera made her recording debut with the self-written single "Do zore", released under Generacija Zed in February 2021. She rose to more significant popularity upon the release of "Baraba" in August 2022. It was followed by "Kalaši" in November, which rose atop of the Billboard's Croatia Songs chart. Zera performed at the 2023 New Year's Eve concert in front of the House of the National Assembly in Belgrade.

== Discography ==
=== Singles ===
Title	Year	Peak chart positions		Album
Title	Year	AUT	CRO Billb.	Album
"Do zore"	2021	—	—	Non-album singles
"Da li si?"	2021	—	—	Non-album singles
"Zove"	2021	—	—	Non-album singles
"Namerno" (with Maleni)	2021	—	—	Non-album singles
"Papa"	2022	—	—	Non-album singles
"Iz subote u petak"	2022	—	—	Non-album singles
"Olako"	2022	—	—	Non-album singles
"Baraba"	2022	—	5	Non-album singles
"Kalaši"	2022	48	1	Non-album singles
"Lepadasy" (with Inas)	2022	—	23	Non-album singles
"Nad****a"	2023	—	6	Non-album singles
"Tvoje ime" (with Henny)	2023	49	5	Non-album singles
"Frauen" (with Nucci)	2023	—	8	Non-album singles
"Alkohol i disko"	2023	—	—	Non-album singles
"Ccuti" (with Desingerica)	2023	—	2	Non-album singles
"Prezime" (with Darko Lazić)	2024	—	2	Non-album singles
"Majmun"	2024	—	—	Non-album singles
"Ccrno" (with Desingerica and Pajak)	2024	—	25	Non-album singles

=== Promotional singles ===
Title	Year	Album
"Medley performance MAC 2023"	2023	non-album single

=== Other charted songs ===
Title	Year	Peak chart positions	Album
Title	Year	CRO Billb.	Album
"Moj broj" (with Rasta)	2022	12	Geto Sport Mixtape
