= Ines Erbus =

- Also known as: Ine Erbus
- Born: Ines Dimnik Erbus; 1 August 1993 (age 33); Ljubljana, Slovenia
- Genres: Pop
- Occupation: Singer
- Instrument: Vocals
- Years active: 2006–present
- Label: SoundArt

Ines Dimnik Erbus (born 1 August 1993), known professionally as Ines Erbus, is a Slovenian singer. She rose to prominence as a member of the girl group Foxy Teens. While a part of Foxy Teens, Erbus began to establish herself as a solo artist with the release of the song "Dim od cigareta". After leaving the group in October 2013, Erbus released several other songs, including "Moje oči plave" and "Slovenec in Slovenka" with Mišo Kontrec. Though Erbus is Slovenian, she sings many of her hits in the Serbo-Croatian language.

== Career ==
At the age of eight Erbus started singing as a part of the RTV Slovenija Children's Choir in which she sang for the next 6 years. The choir released an album in 2001 titled Otroške pesmi in popevke. In 2006 Erbus was called together with Nika Krmec, Kim Perme, Katja Mihelčič and Tanja Petrušič to form the second line-up of the pop group Foxy Teens. The group released the studio album Gremo fantje! (2008) which generated the singles "Gremo fantje!", "Zaljubljena v skejterja" and "Modre oči". Erbus has provided voice-over work for the animated characters Flora and Tecna in the Slovene dub of the Winx Club series. The group went on disbanded in October 2013, allowing Erbus and the other members to pursue solo projects.

== Singles ==
- "Dim od cigareta" (2013)
- "Moje oči plave" (2014)
- "Malo se popilo" (2015)
- "Slovenec in Slovenka" (2016)
- "Kada cura časti" (2016)
- "Nemoj mi reći" (2017)
- "Sama sem kriva" (2017)
- "Tornado" (2017)
- "No no no" (2017)
- "Ti i ja" (2018)
- "Ambis ljubavi" (2019)
- "Šah mat" (2020)
