= Teodora Džehverović =

Serbian singer (born 1997)

Teodora Теодора
- Also known as: TeodoRa
- Born: Teodora Džehverović; 10 February 1997 (age 29); Kačarevo, Serbia, FR Yugoslavia
- Genres: Pop
- Occupations: Singer; TV personality
- Instrument: Vocals
- Years active: 2014–present
- Labels: Grand; IDJTunes; SevenSky

Teodora Džehverović (Serbian Cyrillic: Теодора Џехверовић, born on 10 February 1997) is a Serbian singer. Born in Kačarevo, she rose to prominence after she had competed on the ninth season of Zvezde Granda in 2014 and later gained further popularity by appearing on the reality show Zadruga (2017–2018), finishing in 3rd place.

Teodora has released two studio albums: Borbena (2019) and Žena bez adrese (2024), and numerous standalone singles.

== Early life ==
Džehverović was born on 10 February 1997 in the South Banat village of Kačarevo to a Serb mother, Gordana Nakić, and Bosniak father, Sead Džehverović. She has an older brother, Sava. Around the time she turned five, Teodora's father began looking for expanded employment opportunities in the construction industry by travelling to Russia where he would spend up to 10 months every year as a guest worker, resulting in him being absent from a significant portion of his daughter's childhood.

By the time she completed primary school, Džehverović and her family moved to the nearby town Pančevo to better facilitate her pursuit of ballet dancing.

== Career ==
Džehverović rose to prominence as a contestant on the singing competition Zvezde Granda in 2014. The show's creator and producer, Saša Popović, then formed a girl group, called Đavolice (She Devils), consisted of Džehverović and two of her fellow-contestants: Tamara Milutinović and Gorana Babić. Together they released three songs: "Ćuti i vozi" (2015), "Piće za mladiće" (2015) and "Čokolada i vanila" (2016), before their breakup in 2016. Later that year, Džehverović pursued a solo career with her debut single "U 4 oka", released in December 2016.

Teodora saw initial success in 2017 with several collaborations including "Gledaj mene" with In Vivo and "Hijena with Vuk Mob. In September 2017, she entered the first season of the reality show Zadruga. After ten months of competing, Džehverović finished as the second runner-up in June 2018. Her debut album Borbena was released under IDJTunes on 7 March 2019. It was preceded by two singles: "Kristijan Grej" (2017) and "Rari" featuring Coby (2018).

In June 2020, Teodora collaborated with rapper Devito on the single "Vudu". With over 100 million views on YouTube, "Vudu" became the commercially most successful Serbian single in 2020. In August, Džehverović faced scrutiny from Serbian epidemiologist and member of the national COVID-19 crisis headquarters, Predrag Kon, for her summer live shows, which were held against safety measures. Subsequently, mayor of Leskovac, Goran Cvetanović, also requested for her forthcoming live performance in that city to be canceled. In September 2020, Džehverović became the fifth Serbian woman to gross over one million followers on Instagram. In May the following year, she held her first online concert via Serbian streaming service YouBox.

In March 2022, Džehverović joined Relja Popović and Darko Dimitrov at the judges' panel for the first season of the singing television contest IDJShow. The same year, she became the brand ambassador for Puma in Serbia. In late August, Teodora headlined at the Belgrade Music Week Festival for the first time. She performed at the New Year's Eve concert in front of the House of the National Assembly in Belgrade. In March 2023, Teodora collaborated with Breskvica on the single "Drift", which became her first chart-topping entry on the Billboard's Croatia Songs chart. On 15, May 2024, Džehverović released her visual second album, Žena bez adrese, to digital services through SevenSky.

== Discography ==
Studio albums

- Borbena (2019)
- Žena bez adrese (2024)

== Filmography ==
List of performances of Teodora Džehverović on television
Year	Title	Role	Notes
2014–2015	Zvezde Granda	Herself (contestant)	
2017–2018	Zadruga	Herself (contestant)	3rd place
2022	IDJShow	Herself (judge and mentor)	

== Awards and nominations ==
List of awards and nominations of Teodora
Year	Award	Category	Nominee/work	Result	Ref.
2023	Music Awards Ceremony	Urban Pop Song of the Year	"Most na Adi"	Nominated	
2023	Music Awards Ceremony	New Age Collaboration of the Year	"Kontroverzne" (feat. Hurricane)	Nominated	
2023	Music Awards Ceremony	Music Video of the Year	"Magije"	Nominated	
2023	Music Awards Ceremony	Contribution to Regional Music	Herself and Devito	Won	
