= 2023 Music Awards Ceremony =

Music Awards Ceremony 2023
- Date: 25 and 26 January 2023
- Location: Štark Arena
- Hosted by: Jelena Gavrilović; Tonči Huljić; Voyage; Mimi Mercedez

Highlights
- Most awards: Konstrakta; Saša Matić; Voyage; Devito (2)
- Most nominations: Voyage (4)
- Website: musicawardsceremony.com

Television/radio coverage
- Network: Prva (Serbia and Montenegro); BHRT (B&H); CMC TV (Croatia); Kanal 5 (North Macedonia); Planet TV (Slovenia)
- Runtime: Four hours
- Produced by: Marija Nastasijević; Bojan Živanović

Music Awards Ceremony (MAC) 2023, presented by Sky Music, was held on 25 and 26 January 2023 to recognize the best in the music of former Yugoslav countries. The ceremony took place at Štark Arena in Belgrade. Following a two-year break due to the COVID-19 pandemic, the third MAC was announced on 27 November 2022. The event for the first time included two nights, one focusing on pop, rock, folk, world, rap, and hip hop music, and the other for contemporary genres, like trap, drill, urban pop and pop-folk music. On January 20, Serbian actress Jelena Gavrilović and Croatian musician Tonči Huljić were announced as hosts for the first evening, and Serbian rappers Voyage and Mimi Mercedez as hosts for the second one.

== Performances ==
List of main musical performances
Artist(s)	Song(s)
25 January
Tonči Huljić; Jelena Gavrilović	"Marija Magdalena"
Sara Jo	"Divlja"
Riblja Čorba	"Kada padne noć"
Saša Matić; Jelena Rozga	"Ti i ja"
Aco Pejović	"Ponoć"
Konstrakta and Zemlja Gruva	"In corpore sano"
Dženan Lončarević	"Laku noć"
Karolina Gočeva	"Ti si moj"
Joker Out	"Demoni"
Emina	"Slagaću vas sve"
Lexington Band	"Donesi" "Dobro da nije veće zlo" "Dugujem ti sebe"
Petar Grašo	"Je l' ti reka' ko"
26 January
Nucci; Voyage	"Automati" "Crno oko" "Bella Hadid" "Tango" "La la la"
Zera	"Baraba" "Kalaši"
Crni Cerak	"CC #3"
Nikolija	"Dodole" "Gringo" "Prezime"
Mimi Mercedez	"Kleopatra"
Teodora; Mahrina; Devito	"Tresi tresi" "Aventador" "Vudu" "Nina"
Amna; Albino	"Lagana" "Pođi sa mnom Bosnom" "Familija"
Coby; Dejan Petrović Big Band	"Odakle sam ja" "Zlatno dete"
Crni Cerak; Lacku; 2Bona; Sajfer; Veraja	Tribute to Džej "Upalite za mnom sveće"
Milica Pavlović	"15ica" "Posesivna bivša" "Provereno"

List of musical performances during commercial breaks
Artist	Song
25 January
Filarri	"U tami"
26 January
Sergej Pajić	"Kabul"

== Categories and nominees ==
Winners are listed first and are highlighted bold.

=== Public vote-based categories ===
The nominees for the public categories were announced from 20 December 2022. The award system for the categories below were based on the public vote through the official MAC website and YouTube channel. The second and final round of voting began on 23 January.

25 January; Pop, rock, folk, world music and rap/hip hop
Female Pop Song of the Year	Male Pop Song of the Year
Marija Mikić - Kombinacije; Nina Badrić - Pamtim; Domenica - Di si da se volimo; Aleksandra Radović - Prošlo me je; Manca Špik - Le enkrat se živi	Dženan Lončarević - Tišina; Dino Merlin - Krive karti; Boris Subotić - Vrati mi; Saša Kovačević - Lažu te; Lexington Band - Dugujem te sebe
Alternative Pop Song of the Year	Rock Song of the Year
Nika Turković - Dok nas nema; Konstrakta - In corpore sano; Luka Rajić - Ljubimo se; Jyimenik - U tebi; Sara Jo - Zar ne	Buč Kesidi - Idemo do hodnika; Keni Nije Mrtav - 'Ajmo da plešemo; Bair - Ona sanja; Ice On Fire - Po tankom ledu; Joker Out - Barve Oceana
Folk Song of the Year	World Music Song of the Year
Aleksandra Prijović - Zvuk tišine; Barbara Bobak - Duplo gora; Seka Aleksić - Rana; Halid Bešlić - Sviće zora; Mahir Mulalić - Đerdan	Zorja - Zorja; Marko Louis - Dude; S.A.R.S. - Hej, kafano; Dubioza kolektiv - Može li; Bilja Krstić & Bistrik orkestar - Niška Banja
Rap/Hip Hop Song of the Year	Collaboration of the Year
Sajsi MC - Ringe jaja; Prti Bee Gee - Avakari; MIC MC - Invazija (UFO2021); Fox - Med i mleko; Beogradski Sindikat - Ljubav u inat	Saša Matić ft. Jelena Rozga - Ti i ja; Lena Kovačević ft. Gordan Kičić - Lepe laži; Eni Jurišić ft. Matija Cvek - Trebaš li me; Ines Erbus ft. David Amaro - Baš je glupo biti sam; Tamara Milutinović ft. Uroš Živković - Nije realno

26 January; Trap, Balkan trap, urban pop, drill and pop-folk
Male Trap Song of the Year	Female Trap Song of the Year
Devito - Marina; Voyage - Detinjstvo; Gazda Paja - Fila & AirMax; Inas - NYOKOSUZI; Sajfer - Karneval	Nikolija - Pilot; Ermina - Bebi, ja to ne bi; Antonia Gigovska - Oko moje; Tara - Zlato, dijamanti; Senidah - Fama
Balkan Trap Song of the Year	Urban Pop Song of the Year
Coby - Kada svane; Nikolija - Dodole; Nucci - Crno oko; Zera - Baraba; Henny - Martini	Angellina - Oko moje; Teodora - Most na Adi; Sara Jo - Muškarčina; Senidah - Behute; Mia Guček - Independiente
Drill Song of the Year	Pop-Folk Song of the Year
Crni Cerak - CC #2; Voyage - Euforija; Devito - Leden; 2Bona - Zeus; Kane - U krug	Hurricane - Ajde bre; Milica Pavlović - Provereno; Tea Tairović - Dva i dva; Sanja Vučić - Omađijan; Seki - Alen Delon
New Age Collaboration of the Year
Voyage feat. Nucci - Gad; Teodora feat. Hurricane - Kontroverzne; Devito feat. Relja - Omađijala; Seksi feat. Lacku - Pare, pare; Relja Torino feat. Popovska - Haos, lom

Genre-non specific categories
Concert of the Year	Album of the Year
Petar Grašo - Arena Zagreb (March 2022)	Milica Pavlović - Posesivna
Viral Song of the Year	Music Video of the Year
Voyage - Tango; Voyage feat. Nucci - Gad; Milica Pavlović feat. Albino - Šećeru; Senidah - Behute; Crni Cerak- CC #2	Sara Jo - Divlja; Teodora - Magije; Nucci - Crno oko; Zera - Baraba; Crni Cerak- CC #3
Music Festival of the Year
Belgrade Music Week; Pesma za Evroviziju; Dora; Skale; Ohrid Music Festival

=== Other awards ===
Career Achievement	Artist of the Year
Bora Đorđević	Aco Pejović
Contribution to Regional Music	Contribution to International Music
Saša Matić; Teodora and Devito	Konstrakta; KOI KOI Band
Golden MAC for Authenticity	Master of Ceremony
Konstrakta	Coby
