= Coby (musician) =

Serbian hip-hop musician, songwriter and producer

Coby Цоби
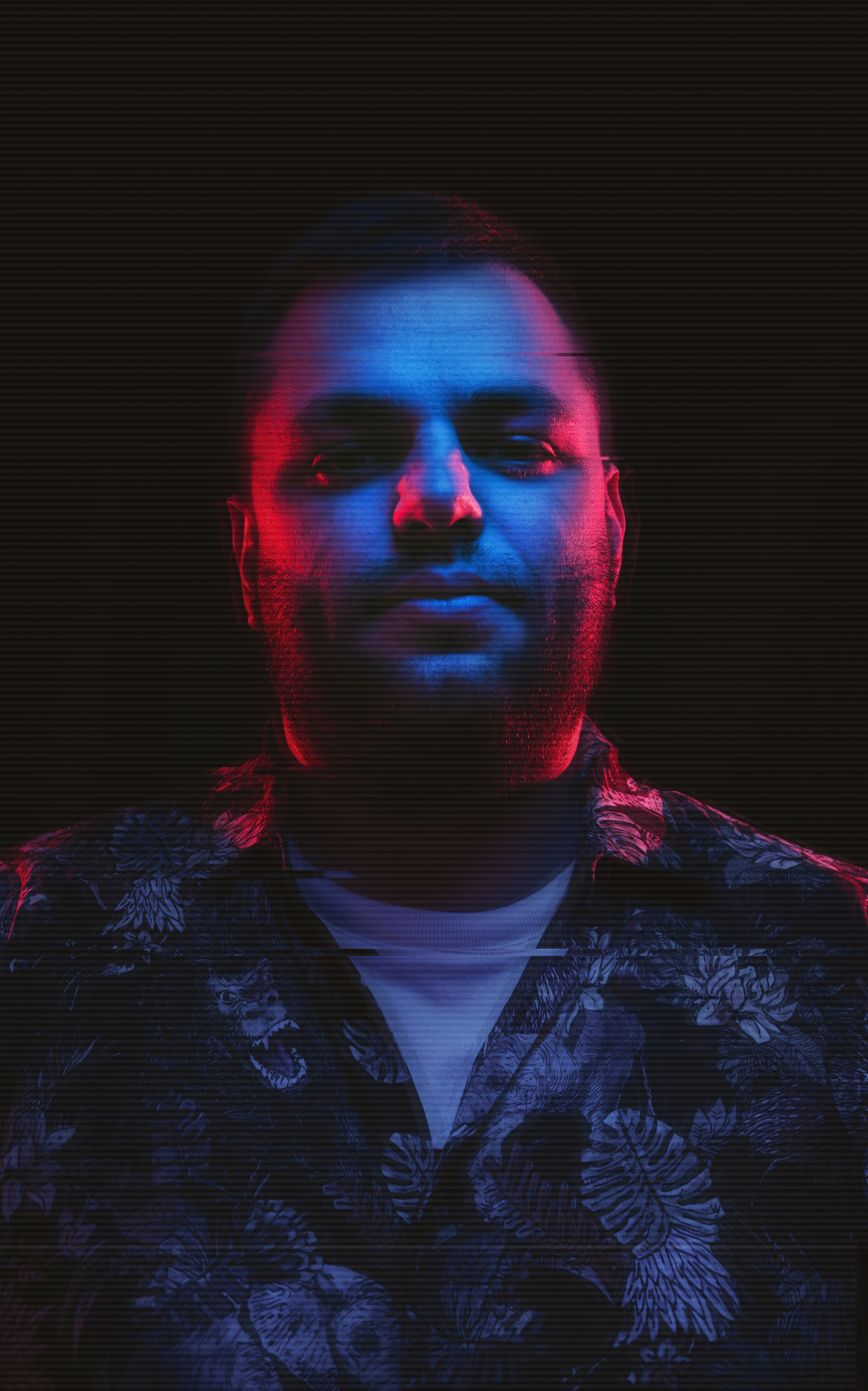

Background information
- Born: Slobodan Veljković; 11 April 1985 (age 41); Belgrade, SR Serbia, SFR Yugoslavia
- Genres: Serbian hip-hop; trap; pop
- Occupations: Rapper; singer; songwriter; record producer
- Years active: 2006–present
- Labels: Bassivity Digital; IDJTunes
- Spouse: Kat Dosa (m. 2026)

Slobodan Veljković (Serbian Cyrillic: Слободан Вељковић, pronounced [slobǒdan ʋěːʎkoʋitɕ]; born 11 April 1985), known professionally as Coby (Serbian: Цоби / Cobi, pronounced [tsǒbi]), is a Serbian rapper, singer, songwriter and record producer.

== Life and Career ==
Born in Belgrade and raised in Prokuplje, Coby relocated to his homeland where he began working with Rexxxona and his record label Bassivity.

Coby gained more significant success by writing and producing songs for pop-folk singers – including Boban Rajović, Dara Bubamara, and Ana Nikolić. As a recording artist he rose to mainstream prominence in 2015, with the single "Ideš za Kanadu" featuring THCF, released for the purposes of the crime documentary series Dosije.

Coby has collaborated with numerous acts, including Elitni Odredi, Rasta, Nikolija, Senidah, Jala Brat, Buba Corelli, Sara Jo, Nataša Bekvalac, Bojana Vunturišević, Teodora Džehverović, and Devito. His is known for blending hip hop music with the elements of Serbian folk music. His songs often feature the producer tag "Coby, jesi ti radio traku?" (lit. 'Coby, did you make the track?').

In January 2023, Coby became the first recipient of the Master of Ceremony Award at the Music Awards Ceremony, for his musical success.

== Personal life ==
In September 2026, Coby married Serbian singer Katarina Cardoso, better known by her stage name Kat Dosa.

== Discography ==
=== Albums ===
==== Studio albums ====
List of studio albums, showing release date, label, chart positions and certifications
Title	Details	Peak chart positions	
Title	Details	AUT	SUI
Dar i kletva	Released: 25 June 2025; Label: Bassivity Digital; Format: Digital download, streaming	40	87

=== Singles ===
==== As lead artist ====
Title	Year	Peak chart positions		Album
Title	Year	AUT	CRO	Album
To nisam bio ja	2013	—	—	Non-album singles
"Ideš za Kanadu" (with THCF)	2015	—	—	Non-album singles
"Mala" (with Rasta)	2015	—	—	Non-album singles
"Džek i Džoni" (with Connect)	2016	—	—	Non-album singles
"Strašno"	2017	—	—	Non-album singles
"Ekipa najjača" (with THCF)	2017	—	—	Non-album singles
"Centralni separe" (with Connect)	2017	—	—	Non-album singles
"Skinite nam fore"	2018	—	—	Non-album singles
"Ja to volim" (with Marlon Brutal)	2018	—	—	Non-album singles
"Rambo"	2018	—	—	Non-album singles
"Ona'e" (with Jala Brat and Buba Corelli)	2018	—	—	Alfa & Omega
"Mami"	2018	—	—	Non-album singles
"Rari" (with Teodora)	2018	—	—	Non-album singles
"4 strane sveta" (with Senidah)	2018	—	—	Non-album singles
"HMoschino"	2018	—	—	Non-album singles
"Biseri iz blata"	2018	—	—	Non-album singles
"Južni vetar gas" (with Mili)	2018	—	—	Non-album singles
"Lukas"	2019	—	—	Non-album singles
"Zver"	2019	—	—	Non-album singles
"Leto je"	2019	—	—	Non-album singles
"Samo probaj"	2019	—	—	Non-album singles
"Moja braća"	2019	—	—	Non-album singles
"Pravi rep"	2019	—	—	Non-album singles
"Devedesete"	2020	—	—	Non-album singles
"Tabak mala"	2020	—	—	Non-album singles
"Divljam" (with Buba Corelli and Jala Brat)	2021	35	6	Non-album singles
"Odakle sam ja" (with Rimski)	2021	—	15	Non-album singles
"Septembar"	2021	—	—	Non-album singles
"Nove pare" (with Krisko)	2021	—	—	Non-album singles
"Zlatno dete"	2022	48	4	Non-album singles
"Ne vole me svi" (with Gir)	2022	—	—	Non-album singles

==== As featured artist ====
Title	Year	Album
"Nikom nije noćas kao meni" (THCF featuring Coby)	2015	Non-album single
"Crni sin" (Cvija and Relja featuring Coby)	2016	Heroji
"Budala" (THCF featuring Coby)	2016	Non-album single
"Sreća" (Rasta featuring Coby)	2017	Indigo
"Najbolji u poslu" (Žuti featuring Coby)	2017	Non-album singles
"Lokacija" (Connect featuring Coby)	2017	Non-album singles
"Samo jako" (Relja featuring Coby and Stoja)	2017	Non-album singles
"Red i zakon" (Goga Sekulić featuring Coby)	2017	Non-album singles
"Ja to volim" (Juice featuring Coby)	2017	Od blata do zlata
"Krvavi Balkan" (THCF featuring Coby)	2017	Non-album single
"Heineken" (Vuk Mob featuring Coby)	2018	Non-album single
"Čista hemija" (Stoja featuring Coby)	2018	Non-album single
"Mala plava" (Nataša Bekvalac featuring Coby)	2018	Non-album single
"Bella Hadid" (Jasko featuring Coby)	2018	Fiasko
"O.D.D.D." (Jala Brat featuring Coby and Buba Corelli)	2019	99
"Pazi se" (Jovana Nikolić featuring Coby)	2020	Non-album single
"Inderlude Ii" (Skubi featuring Coby)	2020	Baos
"Intro" (Mayer featuring Coby)	2021	Raštiman rastaman

== Awards and nominations ==
List of awards and nominations of Coby
Year	Award	Category	Nominee/work	Result	Ref.
2020	Music Awards Ceremony	Trap Song of the Year	"Biseri iz blata"	Nominated	
2020	Music Awards Ceremony	Trap Collaboration of the Year	"O.D.D.D." (Jala Brat & Buba Corelli feat. Coby)	Nominated	
2023	Music Awards Ceremony	Balkan Trap Song of the Year	"Kada svane"	Won	
2023	Music Awards Ceremony	Master of Ceremony	Himself	Won	
