= Mimi Mercedez =

Serbian rapper and singer (born 1992)

Mimi Mercedez Мими Мерцедез
- Born: Milena Janković; 23 November 1992 (age 33); Belgrade, Serbia, FR Yugoslavia
- Genres: Hip hop
- Occupations: Rapper; singer; songwriter
- Instruments: Vocals
- Years active: 2011–present
- Labels: Bombe Devedesetih; Geto Gerila; Universal Music; Bassivity

Milena Janković (Serbian Cyrillic: Милена Јанковић, born on 23 November 1992), known professionally as Mimi Mercedez (Serbian Cyrillic: Мими Мерцедез), is a Serbian rapper, singer, and songwriter. She is considered a pioneer and one of the most prominent female rappers in Serbia and the former Yugoslavia. Debuting in 2011, Mercedez has released five studio albums to date.

She has frequently collaborated with Serbian producer Zartical. In addition to her own work, Janković has written for other singers such as Nikolija, Milica Pavlović, and Jelena Karleuša.

== Life and career ==
Janković was born on November 23, 1992 in Belgrade, FR Yugoslavia, and grew up in the neighborhood of Konjarnik. She has stated that her interest in rap music originated in her late teenage years. Janković graduated high school from the Third Belgrade Gymnasium.

In 2011, she released her first song, "Napucane svinjice", which was later included on her independently-released debut mixtape, Jedino što znam in 2013. Mercedez was also featured on the track "Mala ima kasko" from the 2012 album Apetiti mi rastu by Serbian rapper Juice.

In February 2015, Mimi Mercedez released her EP Napaljene uličarke under Bombe Devedesetih. In August, it was followed by her first album, Našminkam se i pravim haos (I put my makeup on and I make a mess). The album included "Kleoptara" (Cleopatra), which became her first mainstream popular song. Same year, she also collaborated with singers Milan Stanković and Mile Kitić on the single "Gadure" . The following August, Mercedez had another mainstream hit with singer Kaya, titled "Ne možeš da sediš sa nama" (You Can't Sit With Us). In 2018, she released two album: Stara Mimi(Old Mimi) and Kuma (The Godmother). The following year in February, Mercedez had two duets with singer Stoja: "Svet se vrti oko nas" (The world spins around us) and "Žena sa Balkana" (Balkan Woman). In October 2019, she released Mržnja(Hatred), which was preceded by the title track and single "Kučke".

In July 2022, she performed for the first time at the EXIT music festival in Novi Sad. In October, during her concert at Tvornica Kulture in Zagreb, Mercedez announced her forthcoming fifth studio album. On December 31, she was among the performing artists at the closing ceremony of the Novi Sad's year as the European Capital of Culture. On 26 January 2023, Mercedez alongside Voyage presented the Music Awards Ceremony, held at the Štark Arena, during which she also performed "Kleopatra". Her fifth album, Frka u svemiru (Chaos In The Space), was released on 17 February 2023. It was preceded by the singles "Dajivé komì" (To Live Like Us) featuring Seksi, "Ratatata" featuring Marlon Brutal, "Tik Tok" featuring Mili in 2022, and "Simp" in 2023. In February the following year, Mercedez collaborated with Croatian rapper Grše on the single "Tokyo Drift", which peaked at number two on the Billboard's Croatia Songs chart.

In February 2025, Mercedez competed on Serbia's national selection festival for the Eurovision Song Contest 2025, called Pesma za Evroviziju '25, with the song "Turbo žurka" (Turbo Party). She finished in fifth place.

== Artistry ==
Janković previously had stated that her stage name comes from an incident in which she was hit by a Mercedes-Benz car as a child, but afterwards confessed that it was a joke.

Besides Mimi Mercedez, she has assumed several other alter egos throughout her career, including Guda iz Huda, Sestra Drugarica and Kabasti Koblenc, which she initially incorporated to "increase" the presence of women in Serbian hip hop. She has been known to reference life in the 1990s in Serbia in her songs. Through the use of metaphors, punch lines, and word play, her lyrics often explore sociopolitical themes, such as social stratification and sex-positivity. According to art theorist Milica Ivić of Politika, Mercedez "decisively" challenges gender roles and inequality in her music, but does not embrace a "feminist identity".

On the International Women's Day 2023, Muzika.hr listed Mercedez among the regional female artists who "have left their trace on music". Her single "Dajivé Komì" was among the finalists nominated for the 2023 Milan Mladenović Award.

== Discography ==
Studio albums

- Našminkam se i pravim haos (2015)
- Kuma (2018)
- Stara Mimi (2018)
- Mržnja (2019)
- Frka u svemiru (2023)
