= Senidah discography =

Discography

- Studio albums: 3
- EPs: 2
- Live albums: 1
- Singles: 42
- Music videos: 46
- Promotional singles: 2

Slovenian singer and songwriter Senidah has released three studio albums, one live album, two extended plays (EPs), 42 singles (including five as a featured artist), 46 music videos and two promotional singles.

== Albums ==
=== Solo studio albums ===
List of solo studio albums, showing release date, label and chart positions
| Title | Details | Peak chart positions |
| Title | Details | AUT |
|---|---|---|
| Bez tebe | Released: 25 March 2019; Label: Bassivity Digital; Format: Digital download, streaming | — |
| Za tebe | Released: 18 November 2022; Label: Bassivity Digital; Format: Digital download, streaming | 53 |
| Sen i dah | Released: 25 February 2025; Label: Bassivity Digital; Format: Digital download, streaming | 63 |
"—" denotes a recording that did not chart.

=== Collaborative studio albums ===
List of collaborative studio albums, showing release date, label and chart positions
| Title | Details |
|---|---|
| Van vremena (with Coby) | Released: TBA; Label: Bassivity Digital; Format: Digital download, streaming |

=== Live albums ===
List of live albums, showing release date, label and chart positions
| Title | Details |
|---|---|
| Live from Belgrade | Released: 17 February 2025; Label: Bassivity Digital; Format: Digital download, streaming |

== Extended plays ==
List of extended plays, showing release date, label and chart positions
| Title | Details |
|---|---|
| Sen i dah (Deluxe Edition) | Released: 6 June 2025; Label: FCKN A!; Format: Digital download, streaming |
| U meni je sunce | Released: 22 May 2026; Label: FCKN A!; Format: Digital download, streaming |

== Singles ==
=== As lead artist ===
List of singles as lead artist, showing year released, chart positions, certifications and album name
| Title | Year | Peak chart positions | | | | | | | Album |
| Title | Year | AUT | AUT Billb. | CRO | CRO Billb. | GER | SRB | SWI | Album |
|---|---|---|---|---|---|---|---|---|---|
| "Slađana" | 2018 | — | (Note: Austria Songs and Croatia Songs were launched on 15 February 2022.) | — | | — | — | — | Bez tebe |
| "Belo" | 2018 | — | (Note: Austria Songs and Croatia Songs were launched on 15 February 2022.) | — | | — | — | — | Bez tebe |
| "4 strane sveta" (with Coby) | 2018 | — | (Note: Austria Songs and Croatia Songs were launched on 15 February 2022.) | — | | — | — | — | Non-album single |
| "Nisi bio tu" | 2018 | — | (Note: Austria Songs and Croatia Songs were launched on 15 February 2022.) | — | | — | — | — | Bez tebe |
| "Bez tebe" | 2018 | — | (Note: Austria Songs and Croatia Songs were launched on 15 February 2022.) | — | | — | — | — | Bez tebe |
| "Ride" | 2019 | — | (Note: Austria Songs and Croatia Songs were launched on 15 February 2022.) | — | | — | — | — | Non-album singles |
| "Mišići" | 2019 | — | (Note: Austria Songs and Croatia Songs were launched on 15 February 2022.) | — | | — | — | — | Non-album singles |
| "Sve bih" (with Atlas Erotika) | 2019 | — | (Note: Austria Songs and Croatia Songs were launched on 15 February 2022.) | — | | — | — | — | Non-album singles |
| "202" | 2019 | — | (Note: Austria Songs and Croatia Songs were launched on 15 February 2022.) | — | | — | — | — | Non-album singles |
| "100%" (with RAF Camora) | 2019 | 3 | (Note: Austria Songs and Croatia Songs were launched on 15 February 2022.) | — | | 28 | 20 | 6 | Non-album singles |
| "Samo uživaj" | 2020 | — | (Note: Austria Songs and Croatia Songs were launched on 15 February 2022.) | — | | — | — | — | Non-album singles |
| "Ko je" | 2020 | — | (Note: Austria Songs and Croatia Songs were launched on 15 February 2022.) | — | | — | — | — | Non-album singles |
| "Piješ" | 2020 | — | (Note: Austria Songs and Croatia Songs were launched on 15 February 2022.) | — | | — | — | — | Non-album singles |
| "Viva Mahalla" | 2020 | — | (Note: Austria Songs and Croatia Songs were launched on 15 February 2022.) | — | | — | — | — | Non-album singles |
| "Dođi" (with Dino Merlin) | 2021 | — | (Note: Austria Songs and Croatia Songs were launched on 15 February 2022.) | 22 | | — | — | — | Mi |
| "Deca techna" (with Cazzafura) | 2021 | — | (Note: Austria Songs and Croatia Songs were launched on 15 February 2022.) | — | | — | — | — | Non-album singles |
| "Replay" | 2021 | — | (Note: Austria Songs and Croatia Songs were launched on 15 February 2022.) | — | 23 | — | — | — | Non-album singles |
| "Balkanka" | 2021 | — | (Note: Austria Songs and Croatia Songs were launched on 15 February 2022.) | — | | — | — | — | Non-album singles |
| "Fama" | 2021 | — | (Note: Austria Songs and Croatia Songs were launched on 15 February 2022.) | — | | — | — | — | Non-album singles |
| "Behute" | 2022 | 15 | 5 | — | 1 | — | — | 50 | Za tebe |
| "Jadnaja" | 2022 | — | — | — | — | — | — | — | Za tebe |
| "Druga strana" | 2022 | — | — | — | — | — | — | — | Non-album singles |
| "Play With Heart" | 2022 | — | — | — | — | — | — | — | Non-album singles |
| "Dva prsta" | 2022 | — | — | — | 12 | — | — | — | Za tebe |
| "#77" | 2024 | — | — | — | — | — | — | — | Non-album singles |
| "Greh" (with Cazzafura) | 2024 | — | — | — | — | — | — | — | Non-album singles |
| "Delija" | 2024 | 71 | — | — | 2 | — | — | — | Sen i dah |
| "Alo alo" | 2024 | — | — | — | 24 | — | — | — | Sen i dah |
| "Idi gade" | 2024 | — | — | — | 16 | — | — | — | Sen i dah |
| "Omen" | 2024 | — | — | — | 9 | — | — | — | Sen i dah |
| "Phuket" | 2024 | — | — | — | — | — | — | — | Sen i dah |
| "Bandida" (with Adriel Favela) | 2025 | — | — | — | — | — | — | — | Non-album singles |
| "Ti i ja" | 2025 | — | — | — | 25 | — | — | — | Non-album singles |
| "Čista ljubav" (with Adi Šoše) | 2026 | — | — | — | 22 | — | — | — | Non-album singles |
| "Sexy" (with Coby) | 2026 | — | — | — | 11 | — | — | — | Van vremena |
| "Amor" | 2026 | — | — | — | — | — | — | — | Non-album singles |
| "Extraños" | 2026 | — | — | — | — | — | — | — | Non-album singles |
"—" denotes a recording that did not chart.

=== As featured artist ===
List of singles as featured artist, showing year released, chart positions, certifications and album name
| Title | Year | Peak chart positions | Certifications | Album |
| Title | Year | AUT | Certifications | Album |
|---|---|---|---|---|
| "Cypher" (as part of Guapo Gang) | 2018 | — | | Non-album single |
| "Kamikaza" (Jala Brat and Buba Corelli featuring Senidah) | 2019 | 42 | IFPI AUT: Gold | Alfa & Omega |
| "Bulbule" (Marko Louis featuring Senidah) | 2025 | — | | 25 |
| "Love Machine" (Laibach featuring Senidah) | 2026 | — | | Musick |
| "Od početka" (Batista Cadillac featuring Senidah) | 2026 | — | | II |
"—" denotes a recording that did not chart.

=== Promotional singles ===
List of promotional singles, showing year released, chart positions and album name
| Title | Year | Album |
|---|---|---|
| "Jungle Session" | 2022 | Non-album promotional single |
| "Dopamin" (Remix) (with Adel and Ceasar DD) | 2024 | Vita lögner & svarta får |

== Other charted songs ==
List of other charted songs, with selected chart positions, showing year released and album name
| Title | Year | Peak chart positions | Album |
| Title | Year | CRO Billb. | Album |
|---|---|---|---|
| "Level" | 2022 | 5 | Za tebe |
| "Moj si high" | 2025 | 10 | Sen i dah |
| "Led i vatra" | 2025 | 17 | Sen i dah |

== Guest appearances ==
List of non-single guest appearances, with other performing artists, showing year released and album name
| Title | Year | Other artist(s) | Album |
|---|---|---|---|
| "Pustinjom" | 2011 | Zlatko | Non-album song |
| "Program tvog kompjutera" (Cockta 2012) | 2012 | none | Cockta Tunes Live Radio |
| "Več od lajfa" | 2012 | Zlatko | Plečnikova roža |
| "Hvala ti" | 2012 | Zlatko | Plečnikova roža |
| "Kronik" | 2015 | Nipke | Nipke |
| "Ogledalo" | 2015 | Nipke | Nipke |
| "Mediteran" | 2023 | Who See | Kako jeste i kako je moglo |
| "Siroče" | 2025 | Coby | Дар и клетва |

== Songwriting credits ==
List of songs written or co-written for other artists, showing year released and album name
| Title | Year | Artist(s) | Album |
|---|---|---|---|
| "To mi je všeč" | 2016 | Nina Pušlar | Nina |
| "Za vedno" | 2017 | Nina Pušlar | Nina |
| "Za naju" | 2018 | Nina Pušlar | Nina |
| "Bulevari" | 2019 | Đogani | Just Flow |
| "Dodiri" | 2019 | Đogani | Just Flow |

== Music videos ==
List of music videos, showing year released and directors
| Title | Year | Director(s) |
|---|---|---|
| "Pustinjom" | 2011 | Blaže Banjac |
| "Slađana" | 2018 | Žiga Radulj |
| "Cypher" | 2018 | Nejc Miljak; Tilen Bačar |
| "Belo" | 2018 | Žiga Radulj |
| "4 strane sveta" | 2018 | Reksona |
| "Ride" | 2019 | Moonbase |
| "Crno srce" | 2019 | Lazar Bogdanović |
| "Mišići" | 2019 | КУКЛА |
| "Sve bih" | 2019 | CazzaNostra |
| "Kamikaza" | 2019 | Ljubba Stefanović |
| "100%" | 2019 | Shaho Casado |
| "Samo uživaj" | 2020 | Nemanja Novaković |
| "Ko je" | 2020 | Sašo Štih |
| "Piješ" | 2020 | КУКЛА |
| "Viva Mahalla" | 2020 | Senidah; КУКЛА |
| "Dođi" | 2020 | КУКЛА |
| "Replay" | 2021 | Nemanja Novaković |
| "Balkanka" | 2021 | Dylan Bénet; Žiga Radulj |
| "Fama" | 2021 | Anže Škrube |
| "Behute" | 2022 | Ljubba Stefanović |
| "Jadnaja" | 2022 | Senidah |
| "Druga strana" | 2022 | Igor Zečević |
| "Play With Heart" | 2022 | Gašper Pavli |
| "Dva prsta" | 2022 | Ljubba Stefanović |
| "Level" | 2023 | Anže Škrube |
| "Mediteran" | 2023 | Mario Đorđević |
| "Senida" | 2023 | none |
| "Greh" | 2024 | Anže Škrube |
| "Delija" | 2024 | David Jovanović |
| "Alo alo" | 2024 | Senidah |
| "Idi gade" | 2024 | David Jovanović |
| "Omen" | 2024 | Senidah |
| "Phuket" | 2024 | Senidah |
| "Moj si high" | 2025 | Damir Ličina |
| "Bandida" | 2025 | Anže Škrube |
| "Bulbule" | 2025 | Dragan Jereminov |
| "Ti i ja" | 2025 | Anže Škrube |
| "Čista ljubav" | 2026 | Arnej Misirlić |
| "Sve to sam ja" | 2026 | Anže Škrube |
| "U meni je sunce" | 2026 | Anže Škrube |
| "Amina" | 2026 | Anže Škrube |
| "Sexy" | 2026 | Vanja Ulepić |
| "Amor" | 2026 | unknown |
| "Od početka" | 2026 | Jan Filip Jordan Frangeš |
| "Love Machine" | 2026 | КУКЛА |
| "Extraños" | 2026 | Anže Škrube |
