= Live from Belgrade =

Live album by Senidah
- Released: 17 February 2025
- Recorded: 30 August 2024
- Venues: Tašmajdan Stadium (Belgrade, Serbia)
- Length: 98:09
- Language: Serbian
- Label: Bassivity Digital

Senidah chronology
Za tebe (2022)	Live from Belgrade (2025)	Sen i dah (2025)

Live from Belgrade is the first live album by the Slovenian singer-songwriter Senidah. Recorded on 30 August 2024 at the Tašmajdan Stadium in Belgrade, Serbia, it was released through Bassivity Digital on 17 February 2025. Live from Belgrade preceded Senidah's third studio album Sen i Dah by just eight days.

== Background ==
On 13 June 2024, Senidah announced her first major solo concert, set to take place at Belgrade's Tašmajdan Stadium and organized by Skymusic. Answering to Telegraf's question about why she chose Belgrade for her first major concert, Senidah responded that Belgrade was "where everything began. I mean, that is where the audience first accepted me in a way." She also announced that she would perform "an unreleased song or two", and also that she would not perform any of her material in Slovene. Senidah also revealed that Dino Merlin and RAF Camora, whom she released "Dođi" and "100%" with, respectively, would not join her on stage.

Regarding Dino Merlin's appearance, she stated that, out of respect for him and fear that he would refuse, she hadn't dared to ask him to be a guest performer: "I am not allowed to say, but when it comes to Dino Merlin, you are his guest. He is not your guest. He cannot be my guest, I can be his guest! For now, I don't know, I didn't even call him, because I was very afraid that he would refuse." Merlin would later be a guest at her Skenderija concert on 1 August 2025.

Weeks before the concert, on 19 August 2024, Senidah released her single "Idi gade" from her then-upcoming third solo album Sen i Dah. Anđelo Jurkas of Mixer described "Idi gade" as a "mixture of Ceca and Lepa Brena in the fine instrumental of the Truth Hurts hit 'Addictive'". On the day of the concert, Senidah premiered the music video for "Omen", which was also the opening song of the concert. Jurkas compared "Omen" to Severina's 2017 single "Kao", and said that it "functions as a seal of classic singing and songwriting qualities, and that's extremely important news and a message to all the new pretenders who are counting on production and Auto-Tunes to be their salvation. They're not. A song is."

The concert attracted a crowd of 10,000. It was attended by multiple high-profile pop culture personalities, including Lepa Brena, Nataša Bekvalac and Anđelka Stević Žugić, and was met with overwhelmingly positive reviews. Republika.rs dubbed it a "spectacular event", while Marko Jović of Kurir praised Senidah's vocal abilities.

== Release ==
On 17 February 2025, Senidah announced her third solo studio album Sen i Dah, sharing its cover art and tracklist on Instagram. That same evening, at 18:00 CET, she shared the video of her Tašmajdan concert on YouTube. The live album was released digitally on 21 February 2025, with a backdated release date of 17 February.

== Track listing ==
Live from Belgrade track listing
No.	Title	Originally released on	Length
1.	"Omen"	Sen i dah (2025)	4:25
2.	"Belo"	Bez tebe (2019)	3:24
3.	"Jadnaja"	Za tebe (2022)	3:15
4.	"Nisi bio tu"	Bez tebe	2:25
5.	"Treći svet"	Bez tebe	1:45
6.	"Aman"	Bez tebe	5:11
7.	"Zauvek"	Za tebe	3:41
8.	"Crno srce"	Bez tebe	3:31
9.	"Slađana"	Bez tebe	3:24
10.	"Strava"	Bez tebe	2:53
11.	"Deca techna"	2021 stand-alone single	3:55
12.	"Sunce sije"	Sen i dah	3:50
13.	"Balkanka"	2021 stand-alone single	4:02
14.	"Senida" (with Žene)	Za tebe	3:18
15.	"4 strane sveta" (with Coby)	2018 stand-alone single	4:24
16.	"Level"	Za tebe	4:44
17.	"Delija"	Sen i dah	4:06
18.	"Dva prsta"	Za tebe	3:14
19.	"Piješ"	2020 stand-alone single	3:11
20.	"Replay"	2021 stand-alone single	3:52
21.	"Mesečina i ja"	Za tebe	2:26
22.	"Alo alo"	Sen i dah	3:45
23.	"Viva Mahalla"	2020 stand-alone single	2:30
24.	"Idi gade"	Sen i dah	2:53
25.	"Behute"	Za tebe	5:00
26.	"100%"	2019 stand-alone single	4:08
27.	"Mišići"	2019 stand-alone single	5:08
Total length:			98:09

- All tracks are subtitled "Live from Belgrade".

== Credits ==
Credits adapted from Youtube.

- Tadej Košir – guitar
- David Debevec – drums
- Gregor Robič – electric bass
- Anže Kacafura – synth bass
- Anže Vrabec – keyboards
- Martin "Buco" Janežič – percussion
- Igor Matković – trumpet
- Bojan Zupančič – saxophone
- Domen Gantar – trombone
- Mirjana Nešković – violin
- Jelena Dimitrijević – violin
- Ivana Lazić – viola
- Katarina Stanković – cello
- Suzana Dinić – backing vocals
- Mladen Lukić – backing vocals

== Release history ==
Release history for Live from Belgrade
Region	Date	Format	Label	Ref.
Various	17 February 2025	Video streaming	Bassivity Digital	
Various	21 February 2025	Digital download	Bassivity Digital	
Various	21 February 2025	Audio streaming	Bassivity Digital	
