= Za tebe =

Studio album by Senidah
- Released: 18 November 2022
- Recorded: 2021–2022
- Genre: Alternative pop; hip-hop; alternative R&B
- Length: 50:56
- Language: Serbian
- Label: Bassivity Digital
- Producer: Cazzafura; Jan Magdevski

Senidah chronology
Bez tebe (2019)	Za tebe (2022)	Live from Belgrade (2025)

Singles from Za Tebe
- 1. "Behute" Released: 28 January 2022; 2. "Jadnaja" Released: 6 April 2022; 3. "Dva prsta" Released: 2 November 2022

Za tebe (pronounced [za têbe]; transl. For You) is the second studio album by Slovenian singer-songwriter Senidah. It was released digitally on 18 November 2022 through Belgrade-based record label Bassivity Digital. Za tebe serves as the follow-up project to her first album Bez tebe (2019). It features guest vocals from Serbian rapper Surreal and an all-women folk group Žene. The album was preceded by three singles: "Behute", "Jadnaja" and "Dva prsta". Primarily, Za tebe is an alternative pop, hip-hop and alternative R&B record that also explores sevdah, flamenco, alternative reggaeton and folk music. It was met with generally positive reception from both critics and the public, and entered the Austrian Albums Chart.

== Background ==
Following the release of her debut album Bez Tebe on 25 March 2019, Senidah released a series of standalone singles, including commercially successful "Mišići" (2019), "Kamikaza" (2019), "100%" (2019), "Dođi" (2021) and "Replay" (2021). At the beginning of 2020, she became the first former Yugoslav artist to gross over 700,000 monthly listeners on Spotify. At the 2020 Music Awards Ceremony in Belgrade she received the Trap Song of the Year Award for "Mišići" as well as the Golden MAC for Authenticity Award.

The album was announced during Senidah's guest appearance on Serbian late night talk show Veče sa Ivanom Ivanovićem in October 2021. The album, as well as its predecessor, is dedicated to Senidah's late mother. In contrast to the sadder tone of Bez Tebe, Za Tebe is more upbeat, as Senidah's mother preferred upbeat music.

== Composition ==
The album opens with "Zauvek" (Forever), a "quirky rap song with a progressive flow". It is followed by the lead single "Behute", which combines sevdah and flamenco and features acoustic guitars, "emotional" vocals, rhythmic handclaps and brass instruments. The title of the song comes from a Turkish word used colloquially in the Western Balkans, meaning "stupor", "inebriation" or "ecstasy". "Saten" (Satin) is a synth-heavy track inspired by the 1980s music. The R&B track "Beli svemir" (White Universe) was compared to the singer's previous album, while the third single "Dva prsta" (Two Fingers) embraces the sound of reggaeton. "Mesečina i ja" (Moonlight and I) and "Level" are dance-pop tracks, and the former is followed by the ballad "Jadnaja" (portmanteau of jadna ja, meaning "poor me"), which served as the second single. "Jug" (South) and "Maria Magdalena" (Mary Magdalene) feature the sounds of drill and trap, over which the artist lays vocal inflections reminiscent of Young Thug. The dance track "Noćne životinje" (Nocturnal Animals) features distorted, "robotic" vocals and a repetitive hook, aiming to imitate the "altered state of consciousness" in the club. The ballad "Kad će doći red" (When Will It Be [My] Turn) incorporates the flamenco sound and handclaps even more prominently than "Behute". The avant-garde, self-titled track "Senida" blends drum and bass production with folk music harmonies and traditional women's choir vocals, leading to comparisons with Eurovision entries. "Femme fatale" is reminiscent of Bond themes, while the closing track "Soba 2" (Bedroom, Pt. 2) is a direct sequel to the artist's previous album's opening track "Soba" (Bedroom). It is a ballad that discards electronic beats and percussion in favour of a guitar, synthesizers and heavy Auto-Tune.

== Singles ==
The lead single "Behute" was released on 28 January 2022, peaking at number one on Billboard Croatia Songs, number five on Billboard Austria Songs, and number fifteen on Ö3 Austria Top 40. "Behute" remained at the summit of the Croatia Songs chart for four weeks, having become the first song to top the newly established chart. Its accompanying music video directed by Ljubba has accumulated over 30 million views on YouTube, as of late November 2022. In the video, Senidah is featured as a matador bullfighting against her love interest.

The album's second single "Jadnaja" was released on the night of 5 April 2022. Music video for "Jadnaja" was shot with an iPhone at a Caribbean beach.

The third single from Za Tebe, titled "Dva prsta", was released on 2 November 2022. The music video, which was also directed by Ljubba, displays scenes of a traditional Balkan wedding with Senidah portraying a bride participating in traditional male customs, an implication that the artist married herself. The video also features references to virginity tests, which were interpreted by B92 as the artist empowering women against degrading traditions. "Dva prsta" debuted and peaked at number 12 on Billboard Croatia Songs.

== Critical reception ==
Professional ratings
Review scores
Source	Rating
Muzika.hr	4/5 stars

In a four out of five-star review, Domagoj Jurić of Muzika.hr was favorable of the album's genre diversity and experimentation in contrast to her more cohesive debut album, comparing it to the catalogue of Billie Eilish and Rosalía's Motomami. Furthermore, he highlighted Senidah's vocal delivery, saying "a harsh, strong, extremely feminine, but at the same time dominantly masculine voice shattered all expectations". On the other hand, Jurić made negative reviews regarding the vocal production on "Noćne životinje", which according to him was "disfigured by filters", and the composition of the tracks "Beli svemir" and "Femme fatale". Vojkan Bećir wrote for Red Bull: "Za Tebe is a rarely [seen] complete album, with a beginning and an end, a clear idea and exceptional execution. It does not follow trends, but only plays with them. [...] For our area, Senidah is what once were Brena or Čola, but also a counterpart of the album of the year which is Renaissance."

Novosti's Lujo Parežanin wrote: "Za Tebe is not a flawless album. First of all, its predecessor's cohesiveness would've done it no harm, and the lyrics occasionally lack the polish that would match the polish of the production, even if we take the linguistic and metrical carelessness of trap as a genre into account. Despite its flaws, it is an exceptionally convincing argument in favor of Senidah's status as the leader of region's new pop. May she live long!"

=== Year-end lists ===
Year-end rankings of Za Tebe
Publication	List	Rank	Ref.
Muzika.hr	The Best Local Albums of 2022	1	

== Track listing ==
Za Tebe track listing
No.	Title	Writer(s)	Producer(s)	Length
1.	"Zauvek"	Senida Hajdarpašić; Benjamin Krnetić; Anže Kacafura; Dino Nuhanović	Cazzafura; Jan Magdevski	3:30
2.	"Behute"	Hajdarpašić; Bojana Vunturišević; Luka Jovanović	Magdevski	3:40
3.	"Saten"	Hajdarpašić; Krnetić	Cazzafura; Magdevski	4:05
4.	"Beli svemir"	Hajdarpašić; Krnetić	Cazzafura; Magdevski	4:06
5.	"Dva prsta"	Hajdarpašić; Krnetić	Cazzafura; Magdevski	3:06
6.	"Mesečina i ja"	Hajdarpašić; Krnetić	Cazzafura; Magdevski	2:20
7.	"Jadnaja"	Hajdarpašić; Krnetić	Cazzafura; Magdevski	2:55
8.	"Jug"	Hajdarpašić; Krnetić	Cazzafura; Magdevski	3:04
9.	"Noćne životinje"	Hajdarpašić; Jovanović; Vunturišević; Relja Milanković	Magdevski	2:39
10.	"Kad će doći red"	Hajdarpašić; Krnetić	Cazzafura; Magdevski	3:16
11.	"Senida" (featuring Žene)	Hajdapašić; Jovanović; Vunturišević; Milanković; Radmila Petrović	Magdevski	3:07
12.	"Femme fatale"	Hajdarpašić; Krnetić	Cazzafura; Magdevski	3:51
13.	"Level"	Hajdarpašić; Jovanović; Vunturišević; Milanković	Cazzafura; Magdevski	3:05
14.	"Maria Magdalena" (featuring Surreal)	Hajdarpašić; Krnetić; Filip Arsenijević	Cazzafura; Magdevski	2:43
15.	"Soba 2" (Outro)	Hajdarpašić; Krnetić	Cazzafura; Magdevski	5:23
Total length:				50:56

== Personnel ==
- Senidah – lead vocals
- Nenad Gajin – guitar (track 2)
- Miloš Nikolić – horns (track 2)
- Tadej Košir – guitar (tracks 3 and 10)
- Grega Robič – bass guitar (tracks 5 and 8)
- Džimi – guitar (tracks 11 and 13)
- Sebastien Graux – guitar (track 12)

== Charts ==
Chart performance for Za Tebe
Chart (2022)	Peak position
Austrian Albums (Ö3 Austria)	53

== Release history ==
Release history for Za Tebe
Region	Date	Format	Label	Ref.
Various	18 November 2022	Digital download; streaming	Bassivity Digital	
