= Sen i dah =

Studio album by Senidah
- Released: 25 February 2025
- Recorded: 2022–2025
- Genres: Alternative pop; alternative R&B
- Length: 47:49
- Language: Serbian
- Label: Bassivity Digital

Senidah chronology
Live from Belgrade (2025)	Sen i dah (2025)	U meni je sunce (2026)

Singles from Sen i Dah
- 1. "Delija" Released: 28 April 2024; 2. "Alo alo" Released: 21 June 2024; 3. "Idi gade" Released: 19 August 2024; 4. "Omen" Released: 30 August 2024; 5. "Phuket" Released: 1 October 2024

Sen i dah (English: Dream and Breath) is the third studio album by Slovenian singer-songwriter Senidah, released on 25 February 2025 via Serbian record label Bassivity Digital. It follows her second album Za Tebe, released in 2022. On 6 June 2025, a deluxe edition EP was released.

== Background ==
Senidah released her second studio album Za Tebe (For You) on 18 November 2022. On 2 June 2023, Senidah performed at the Red Bull Sound Clash live show against Lepa Brena, held at the Belgrade Fortress. During the remainder of 2023, Senidah released the music videos for Za Tebe tracks "Level" and "Senida," as well as featured on "Mediteran" (Mediterranean) from Who See's 2023 album Kako jeste i kako je moglo (How It Is and How It Could've Been).

On 28 February 2024, Luka Dončić's 25th birthday, Senidah released "#77", a song dedicated to Dončić. On 6 April 2024, she released "Greh" (Sin) in collaboration with producer Cazzafura, accompanied by a music video.

Senidah announced that she was working on her third studio album on 26 June 2024 in an interview on Prva's Exkluziv, along with the announcement of a concert at the Tašmajdan Stadium.

== Composition ==
The album opens with "Moj si high" (You're My High), a ballad inspired by death; it builds as a Dino Merlin-style track before descending into African dance rhythms. "Lanci ljubavi" (Chains of Love), whose lyrics were written by the Serbian rapper Sajsi MC, is an energetic, saxophone-heavy synth-pop and Yugo-wave ballad. The third track, "Delija" (Hunk), is a bachata and folk song, resembling the style of Rosalía. The fourth track, "Zovi me" (Call Me), evokes the synth-pop work of Svemirko. It was, alongside the first two tracks, compared to the 1980s music of Madonna, Kim Wilde, and Marina Perazić. The lyrics of the fifth track, "Idi gade" (Go, You Bastard), notably heavily feature cheeky one-liners, while the production features Middle Eastern strings and percussion. It was described as a "mixture of Ceca and Lepa Brena in the fine instrumental of the Truth Hurts hit 'Addictive'". The orchestral ballad "Omen" was compared to Severina's 2017 single "Kao".

The second half of the album opens with "Phuket". The ninth track, a classic R&B and soul song "U tri lepe" (To Hell with It), prominently features a guitar solo by Tadej Košir. It was likened to the works of Leon Bridges and Khruangbin. The tenth track, "Moj mesec" (My Moon), drew comparisons to Eurovision entries and the tribal rhythms of Kanye West's 808s & Heartbreak (2008). "Sunce sije" (The Sun Is Shining) is an anthemic track that features violins and vocal contributions from the Slovenian opera singer Irena Yebuah Tiran. Genre-wise, it was described as "sevdah industrial pop-rock" and a "non-existant collaboration between Dino Merlin and Massive Attack". "Slutim" (I Sense)—heavy with castanets, guitars and trumpets—drew comparisons to Senidah's 2022 hit single "Behute" (Oh, Haze), while "Alo alo" (Hello Hello) drew comparisons to Robyn's 2010 hit single "Dancing on My Own". The closing track, "Da li ti nedostajem?" (Do You Miss Me?), resembles a live recording. Its sparse arrangement consists only of repetitive chords on the electric guitar.

== Release and promotion ==
On 17 February 2025, Senidah revealed the cover and tracklist of the album. Sen i Dah was released on 25 February 2025.

On 6 June 2025, Senidah released a deluxe version of Sen i Dah in the form of an extended play (EP). The EP contained four new tracks, two of which were reworks of the previously released "Greh" and "Dopamin" (Dopamine).

=== Singles ===
The album's lead single, "Delija", was released on 28 April 2024. Its lyrics were co-written by Senidah's frequent collaborators Bojana Vunturišević and Coby, while the music was co-composed by Senidah herself and Coby. The music video, released the same day, was compared to Orange Is the New Black and Joker: Folie à Deux. "Delija" peaked at number one on Billboard's Croatia Songs chart, and number 71 in Austria.

"Alo alo", the second single, was released on 21 June 2024. Its music video, directed by Senidah, was shot in Thailand. "Alo alo" peaked at number 24 on Croatia Songs. The third single, "Idi gade", was released on 19 August 2024. It peaked at number 16 on Croatia Songs. The fourth single, "Omen", was released on 30 August 2024. Its CGI-heavy music video was directed by Senidah herself. "Omen" peaked at number nine on Croatia Songs. On 1 October 2024, Senidah released the fifth single "Phuket". The music video version of the track contained only non-lyrical vocals, while the version with lyrics was released to streaming services.

On 18 March 2025, she released the music video for "Moj si high." The video, which was created by Damir Ličina, features heavy use of generative artificial intelligence (AI). "Moj si high" debuted and peaked at number ten on Billboard's Croatia Songs chart.

=== Tour ===
On 30 August 2024, the same day she released "Omen", Senidah held a concert at the Tašmajdan Stadium in Belgrade. The concert attracted a crowd of over 10,000. On 17 February 2025, she shared her Tašmajdan concert on YouTube in its entirety, and released it in live album format on streaming services under the title Live from Belgrade.

On 18 March 2025, the Sen i Dah Tour was announced. The tour stops included Osijek's Gradski vrt Hall on 10 May, Sarajevo's Skenderija on 1 August, Split's Arena Gripe on 15 November, Ljubljana's Arena Stožice on 13 December, and Novi Sad's SPENS on 28 February 2026.

== Critical reception ==
Aleksa Simić of Portal Analitika wrote: "On her third studio release Sen i Dah, Senidah once again proves that modern pop music in the Balkans is not dead. Contrary to popular belief, the real culprits may be our own inability to recognize where and how it has transformed—and the lack of media space to bring artists like her to the forefront. And yet, Senidah and her team—made up of the most innovative writers the Balkans has to offer, trendsetters of the region's modern sound—have once again shown that music is powerful enough to break down all barriers and rise to the top, not with help, but despite harsh circumstances." Miloš Dašić of City Magazine wrote: "Versatility and eclecticism. The widest possible range of influences and genres—Sen i Dah set out to embrace all of that in just over 45 minutes. And you can hear it. That’s why this album shines like a crown on the head of the ultimate star of the Balkans."

Mirjana Narandžić of Velike priče compared the lyricism of Sen i Dah to Vuk Karadžić's poetry, highlighting "Delija", "Moj mesec" and "Sunce sije". Narandžić dubbed Senidah the leading figure of post-postmodern Balkan Dadaism: "With her distinctive way of articulating, we get something truly different—something we've never heard before in our language, or rather, even in our languages." Karla Kostadinovski of Vox Feminae wrote: "The strength—but perhaps also the weakness—of this album is that its strongest songs were released before the full album came out and had the time and PR push for the audience to embrace them, which cast a shadow over the rest of the tracks, which will now have to fight a bit harder for their slice of the spotlight. On an emotional level, I'd love to give a tight hug to the dementor of pain looming over the album and tell it that everything is okay—and even if it's not, that one day it surely will be."

Year-end rankings for Sen i Dah
Publication	Accolade	Rank	Ref.
Muzika.hr	The Best Domestic (and Regional) Albums of 2025	13	
Vogue Adria (Aleksa Simić)	The Best Regional Albums of 2025	—N/a	

== Track listing ==
Sen i Dah track listing
No.	Title	Lyrics	Music	Length
1.	"Moj si high"	Senida Hajdarpašić; Miodrag Milenković	Anže Kacafura; Hajdarpašić; Gregor Robič	3:58
2.	"Lanci ljubavi"	Ivana Rašić	Kacafura; Hajdarpašić; Tadej Košir	3:48
3.	"Delija"	Bojana Vunturišević; Slobodan Veljković	Veljković; Hajdarpašić	3:16
4.	"Zovi me"	Benjamin Krnetić; Hajdarpašić	Kacafura; Hajdarpašić; Košir	3:27
5.	"Idi gade"	Vunturišević; Veljković	Hajdarpašić; Veljković	2:52
6.	"Omen"	Krnetić	Hajdarpašić; Kacafura	4:10
7.	"Led i vatra"	Marijan Milovanović; Hajdarpašić	Kacafura; Hajdarpašić	3:25
8.	"Phuket"	Hajdarpašić; Krnetić	Kacafura; Hajdarpašić	3:43
9.	"U tri lepe"	Vunturišević	Luka Jovanović; Hajdarpašić	2:40
10.	"Moj mesec"	Veljković	Veljković	2:36
11.	"Sunce sije"	Hajdarpašić; Krnetić	Kacafura; Hajdarpašić; Irena Yebuah Tiran; Košir	3:07
12.	"Slutim"	Veljković; Hajdarpašić	Veljković; Nenad Gajin; Hajdarpašić	3:51
13.	"Alo alo"	Hajdarpašić; Vunturišević	Hajdarpašić; Kacafura	3:05
14.	"Da li ti nedostajem?"	Rašić; Hajdarpašić	Kacafura; Hajdarpašić; Košir	2:59
Total length:				47:49

Deluxe edition EP track listing
No.	Title	Lyrics	Music	Length
1.	"Greh 2" (with Cazzafura)	Milovanović	Jacob Jansson; Gustaf Montin; Hajdarpašić	2:34
2.	"Uzalud"	Milovanović	Kacafura; Hajdarpašić	4:01
3.	"Dopamin 2"	Milovanović	Jansson; Montin; Hajdarpašić	2:48
4.	"So na rane"	Milovanović	Kacafura; Hajdarpašić	2:57
Total length:				12:20

== Charts ==
Chart performance for Sen i Dah
Chart (2025)	Peak position
Austrian Albums (Ö3 Austria)	63

== Release history ==
Release history for Sen i Dah
Region	Date	Format	Version	Label
Various	25 February 2025	Digital download; streaming	Standard edition	Bassivity Digital
Various	6 June 2025	Digital download; streaming	Deluxe edition EP	FCKN A!
