= Ljubavi =

Ljubavi may refer to:

- Ljubavi (album), 2009 album by Serbian singer and songwriter Željko Joksimović
- Ljubavi (Idoli song)", 1985 song by Serbian band Idoli
- Ljubavi (Željko Joksimović song), 2009 single from the eponymous album by Željko Joksimović

== See also ==
- Ljubav (singular)
