= Bez Tebe =

2019 album by Senidah

Bez tebe

Studio album by Senidah
- Released: 25 March 2019
- Recorded: 2018–19
- Genre: Alternative R&B; trap
- Length: 34:03
- Language: Serbian
- Label: Bassivity Digital
- Producer: Cazzafura; Coby

Senidah chronology
Bez tebe (2019)	Za tebe (2022)

Singles from Bez Tebe
- 1. "Slađana" Released: 12 March 2018; 2. "Belo" Released: 3 June 2018; 3. "Nisi Bio Tu" Released: 28 December 2018; 4. "Bez Tebe" Released: 28 December 2018

Bez tebe (pronounced [běz têbe]; transl. Without You) is the debut studio album by Slovenian singer Senidah. It was released on 25 March 2019 by Belgrade-based label Bassivity Digital. Senidah wrote the album mostly with her frequent collaborators Benjamin Krnetić and Anže Kacafura, who produced the record. The album produced three official singles: "Slađana", "Belo" and "Bez tebe". "Nisi bio tu" was also released as a promotional single. Primarily an alternative R&B and trap record, Bez tebe also incorporates synth-pop and trip hop elements. Lyrically, songs are about searching for love.

== Background ==
In March 2018 Senidah released her trap solo single "Slađana" for Belgrade-based label Bassivity Digital, quickly acquiring popularity in Serbia. The second single "Belo" (White) was then released on 3 June. The title track and "Nisi Bio Tu" (You Weren't Here) were released on 28 December, alongside lyrics videos. "Slađana" won The Best Hip-Hop Song of the Year Award at the 2019 Music Awards Ceremony. She started teasing the album on the ceremony red carpet, alongside her collaboration with RAF Camora.

On 19 March 2019 Senidah announced the release of her debut studio album via Instagram. On the day of release, she held a promotion for media, friends and colleagues and presented the music video for "Crno Srce" (Black Heart). The rest of the songs were uploaded to YouTube on 15 May.

== Music and lyrics ==
An alternative R&B and trap record, Bez Tebe also features elements of synth-pop and trip hop. The songs were composed by Senidah alongside album's producer Anže Kacafura, while the lyrics were written by Benjamin Krnetić. The album is dedicated to Senidah's late mother, which is reflected in its title, as it was the first album Senidah released since her mother's death. The album is "sonically cohesive, likely conceived—at least in spirit—before the whirlwind of fame that befell her."

The album's opening track, "Soba" (Room), has a slow trap beat completed with emotional lyrics, settling the tone for the whole record. The meaning behind the title of the lead single, "Slađana", which is a common female first name, was said to be a representation of a random girl seeking for love, whom people can relate to. Whilst, some believe that the title is referring to the street slang term for amphetamine and its influence as an escape from reality, disappointment and loneliness. Others think it's referring to Serbian rock musician Slađana Milošević, who's noted for her unique appearance and musical style. The third track, "Crno Srce" (Black Heart), deepens the dark atmosphere. However, "Aman" (Enough Already) brings brighter vibe, despite singing about a relationship coming to its end. The song also incorporates several Turkish terms common to the Western Balkans. The title track, "Bez Tebe", is a melancholic trap ballad. Sixth track, "Treći Svet" (Third World), was described as a "summer jam". "Vatra" (Fire), also features summer motives, but with a darker tone. "Belo" (White), again holds a drug reference this time with explicit allusions laced throughout the track. "Strava" (Horror) was described as a synth-pop love song influenced by the '80s music. The final track, "Nisi Bio Tu" (You Weren't Here) was based on an unfortunate event from Senidah's life and brings honest ending to the album, featuring acoustic guitar and powerful vocals. In an interview for the Serbian edition of Hello! she dubbed it "her saddest song that she doesn't want to talk about". It is reportedly inspired by a traffic accident that she survived unharmed when she was four years old, which killed her father, seriously injured her mother, and put her sister into a coma.

== Critical reception ==
Professional ratings
Review scores
Source	Rating
Mladina	4/5 stars
Muzika.hr	4/5 stars

Bez Tebe was met with generally positive reviews from critics.

On behalf of Slovenian magazine Mladina, Gregor Kocijančič praised the album and remarked that Senidah brought back the epicentre of Balkan music to Ljubljana for the first time following the punk scene of the 1980s. Nevertheless, he was critical of the record's occasional embrace of turbo-folk elements, while abandoning the frames of R&B.

Writing for Muzika.hr, Patrik Horvat called the album the artist's "powerful and interesting introduction to the general public", noting that she "faithfully transformed her heavy emotions into impressive pieces of art that were authentically brought out by her voice". Buro 24/7 stated that Senidah "should not be worried about her status on the music scene", dubbing her persona "unique" and noting that her songs "scream with emotions despite occasionally unintelligible lyrics." Vanja Ratković of Noizz.rs drew comparisons between Senidah's voice and the voice of British musician FKA Twigs "due to their mysteriousness", claiming that "the Balkans have finally come up with an artist who can compete at an international level".

Reflecting on Bez Tebe in 2025, Aleksa Simić of Portal Analitika wrote that Senidah's universe "is ruled by shades of blue, by nostalgia, and by elements mostly drawn from American R&B—all wrapped in a vocal steeped in Balkan sound, the very quality that launched her into this strange buffer zone between the alternative, the modern, and the familiar, the local. The ten songs on this album are a true journey through Senidah's soul, through her intimate pain, the weight of which she timidly invites us into."

=== Year-end lists ===
Year-end rankings of Bez Tebe
Publication	List	Rank	Ref.
Ravno Do Dna	The Best Local and Regional Albums of 2019	24	

== Track listing ==
Credits adapted from Discogs.

All tracks are written by Senida Hajdarpašić, Benjamin Krnetić and Anže Kacafura, and produced by Cazzafura, except where noted.

No.	Title	Writer(s)	Producer(s)	Length
1.	"Soba" (Intro)			3:20
2.	"Slađana"			2:56
3.	"Crno Srce"	Hajdarpašić; Krnetić; Slobodan Veljković	Coby	3:14
4.	"Aman"			3:52
5.	"Bez Tebe"			3:33
6.	"Treći Svet"			3:20
7.	"Vatra"			3:13
8.	"Belo"			3:21
9.	"Strava"			2:54
10.	"Nisi Bio Tu" (Outro)	Hajdarpašić; Krnetić; Tadej Košir		4:20
Total length:				34:03

Notes

- "Slađana" is stylized as "Sladjana".
- "Treći Svet" is stylized in sentence case.

== Release history ==
Country	Date	Format	Label
Various	25 March 2019	Digital download; streaming	Bassivity Digital
