= Ljuba =

Ljuba may refer to:

- Ljuba (given name), a Slavic given name
- Ljuba, Serbia, a village in Syrmia, Vojvodina
- 1062 Ljuba, an asteroid

== See also ==
- Ljubav (disambiguation)
