= Senidah =

Slovenian singer-songwriter (born 1985)

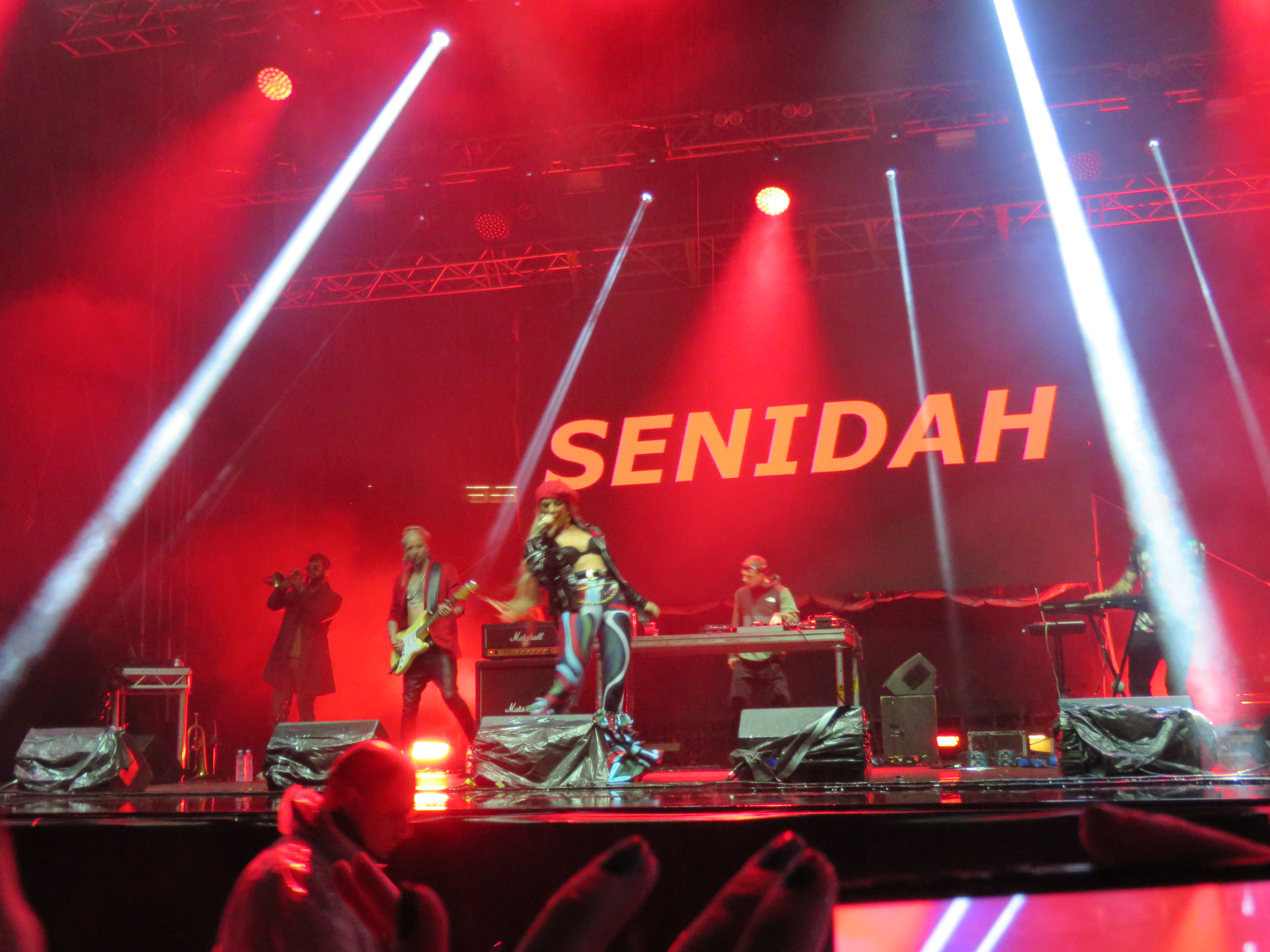
- Senidah in 2022

Background information
- Born: Senida Hajdarpašić; 9 April 1985 (age 41); Ljubljana, SR Slovenia, SFR Yugoslavia
- Genres: Alternative R&B; trap; alternative pop; synth-pop; Balkan folk; soul
- Occupations: Singer; songwriter
- Instruments: Vocals
- Works: Senidah discography
- Years active: 2010–present
- Labels: Bassivity; FCKN A!; Universal
- Member of: Muff
- Website: senidah.com

Senida Hajdarpašić (pronounced [senǐda xǎjdarpaʃitɕ]; born 9 April 1985), known professionally as Senidah (pronounced /sɛˈniːdə/), is a Slovenian singer-songwriter. Dubbed the "Balkan Trap Diva" by the media, Senidah first rose to prominence in the early 2010s as the lead singer of the pop-rock band Muff. She gained further mainstream popularity across the former Yugoslavia with her transition to Serbian-language music and the release of her solo single "Slađana" in 2018.

"Slađana" was later featured on her debut album Bez tebe (2019), which garnered critical acclaim. Between 2019 and 2021, Senidah released a series of commercially successful standalone singles, including "Mišići", "Kamikaza", "100%", "Replay", and "Dođi". Her sophomore album Za tebe (2022) was preceded by the hit single "Behute". Her third album, Sen i dah (2025), was preceded by five successful singles and supported by major concerts across the former Yugoslavia.

Senidah has received seven nominations at the regional Music Awards Ceremony (MAC) and has won three awards, including the Golden MAC for Authenticity in 2020.

== Early life ==
Senida Hajdarpašić was born 9 April, 1985 in Ljubljana, SR Slovenia, SFR Yugoslavia. Her parents were Bosniaks from Bihor near Bijelo Polje, Montenegro. Growing up, she spent summers in Montenegro visiting family. Regarding her identity, Senidah has stated that she was "born in Yugoslavia and will forever remain a Yugoslav".

Senidah grew up listening to popular American artists such as Guns N' Roses, Backstreet Boys, Michael Jackson, and 2Pac, as well as traditional Bosnian sevdalinkas. She has one older sister. When Senidah was four years old, her family was involved in a car accident that claimed her father's life; as a result, her mother became a widow in her twenties. Senidah's talent was discovered by her sister, who would record her singing and post it on the internet. While she was beginning to pursue music professionally, Senidah worked at a bank; she revealed that she would sleep for two hours a night between her job, the studio, and performing. When she was 27 years old, her mother died following an undisclosed illness.

== Career ==
=== Early beginnings and Muff ===
In February 2011, Senidah released her debut solo single "Pustinjom", featuring Slovenian rapper Zlatko. Soon after, she joined electro soul-pop band Muff as the lead vocalist. Their first single "Ti daješ" was released in July 2011.

In March 2014, Muff took part in the preselection contest to represent Slovenia at the Eurovision Song Contest 2014 with the entry "Let Me Be (Myself)". They finished in second place; Tinkara Kovač won with the song "Round and Round." Muff's eponymous album was released in November 2014. Their EP Unity was released in April 2018.

=== 2018–2019: Breakthrough, "Slađana", and Bez tebe ===
In March 2018, Senidah released her solo trap single "Slađana" in Serbian. After the song gained some traction on YouTube, the Belgrade-based label Bassivity Digital offered to re-upload the music video to their official channel. Soon, "Slađana" went viral and has accumulated over 70 million views as of September 2026. Senidah continued collaborating with Bassivity Digital, releasing her next single "Belo" in June 2018. She was also featured on the track "4 strane sveta" by Coby, the founder of Bassivity, as part of the soundtrack to Serbian film South Wind. In December 2018, Senidah released two more singles, "Bez tebe" and "Nisi bio tu", the latter of which recounts a loss of faith following the car accident which took her father's life.

In January 2019, Senidah won the Hip-Hop/Rap Song of the Year Award with "Slađana" at the 2019 Music Awards Ceremony. In March, she released the English-language single "Ride" under Universal Serbia, which had been recorded a couple of years prior. Her debut solo album, Bez tebe, was released in March 2019, entirely in Serbian.

=== 2019–2021: Stand-alone singles ===
On 21 April 2019, Senidah performed at the Bassivity Showcase event at the Belgrade Sports Hall, alongside Bassivity Digital collective. She released "Mišići" and "Sve bih", the latter featuring Atlas Erotika, with the Slovenian label FCKN A! in April and May 2019, respectively. "Mišići" achieved great success, with 94 million views on YouTube as of September 2026. In the summer of 2019 she performed at Exit Gang and the Sea Dance Festival. In July, she co-wrote Đogani's single "Dodiri." On 9 August, she released an English-language single, "202." In mid-August 2019, media outlets reported rumours that Senidah had been internally selected to represent Slovenia in the Eurovision Song Contest 2020; however, these reports later proved to be false. She later stated that she would participate in the Eurovision Song Contest only if she were able to represent the entire former Yugoslavia.

On 15 August 2019, the single "Kamikaza" by Bosnian rap duo Jala Brat and Buba Corelli was released featuring Senidah. The single was a great commercial success, charting on the Ö3 Austria Top 40. On 26 September, Austrian rapper RAF Camora posted a snippet of his upcoming collaboration with Senidah on his Instagram story. The song, titled "100%," was released on 28 November 2019, alongside the music video that was shot in Barcelona, Spain. It peaked at number three in Austria and debuted at number 28 on the Official German Charts on 6 December, becoming the first song in any variant of Serbo-Croatian to enter the chart. The video has accumulated more than 109 million views on YouTube as of February 2026.

As of January 2020, Senidah is the first musician from the former Yugoslavia to reach 700,000 monthly listeners on Spotify. On 27 January 2020, she performed "Mišići" live at the 2020 Music Awards Ceremony. That night, she presented Oliver Mandić with the Career Achievement Award. She also won two awards herself: the Trap Song of the Year Award for "Mišići," presented to her by Jelena Karleuša, and a special Golden MAC for Authenticity Award that was awarded to her by the organizers.

Although she denied it at the Music Awards Ceremony a month before, Telegraf reported in late February 2020 that Senidah collaborated with renowned Bosnian musician Dino Merlin on a song. According to the media, Merlin wrote the song and they shot a music video in Istanbul. However, Senidah denied the rumours once again on Instagram Live. On 1 March 2020, Senidah released the music video for "Samo uživaj," shot at the Faculty of Pharmacy, University of Belgrade. On 12 May 2020, she released the music video for "Ko je," directed and produced by Senidah herself. The video was shot at the streets of Ljubljana, which were deserted due to the COVID-19 pandemic. Three days later, she released the single "Piješ." In August 2020, she released new single "Viva Mahalla."

Senidah began 2021 by releasing "Dođi," her highly anticipated duet with Dino Merlin. On 12 February 2021, Senidah released a collaboration with her long-time collaborator and friend, Slovenian producer Cazzafura, entitled "Deca techna." On 12 May 2021, she released "Replay" in collaboration with the Italian fashion brand of the same name. The song represented a significant change in Senidah's sound, a switch from her usual trap sound to jazz-rock. The music video, released the same day, surpassed a million views within the first day. On 3 July 2021, Senidah performed at the 20th annual Zagreb Pride in Ribnjak. She concluded the year by releasing the single "Fama" on 24 December, a song dedicated to the memory of her mother.

=== 2022–2023: Za tebe ===
Senidah entered 2022 by releasing the single "Behute" on 28 January. The song features flamenco-influenced sonic textures and lyrics drawing on Bosnian folk traditions. "Behute" entered the Austrian and Swiss charts, becoming her third entry in Austria and her second in Switzerland. On 15 February 2022, "Behute" became the first song to top Billboard's newly introduced Croatia Songs chart, while also debuting at number five on the Austria Songs chart. "Behute" was followed by the singles "Jadnaja," "Druga strana," and "Play With Heart," the latter of which served as the official anthem of the Women's EHF Euro 2022, all released within the first half of the year. In early July, it was confirmed that Senidah and Konstrakta would co-headline that year's EuroPride, held in Belgrade. On 17 November 2022, Senidah took to Instagram to reveal the title, cover art and tracklist of her sophomore Serbian-language studio album Za tebe. It featured "Behute," "Jadnaja," and the third single "Dva prsta," which had been released on 2 November. The album was released a day later, on 18 November.

On 2 June 2023, Senidah performed at the Red Bull Sound Clash live show with Lepa Brena, held at the Belgrade Fortress. During the remainder of 2023, Senidah released the music videos for Za tebe tracks "Level" and "Senida," as well as featured on "Mediteran" from Who See's 2023 album Kako jeste i kako je moglo. "Level" reached the peak of number five on Billboard's Croatia Songs chart.

=== 2024–present: Sen i dah and major concerts ===
On 28 February 2024, Luka Dončić's 25th birthday, Senidah released "#77", a song dedicated to the basketball player. In April, she released "Greh" in collaboration with producer Cazzafura, and "Delija," both accompanied by music videos. "Delija" was followed up by a string of commercially successful singles—"Alo alo", "Idi gade", and "Omen"—all of which charted on Billboard's Croatia Songs chart, with "Delija" charting in Austria as well. On 30 August, Senidah held a concert at Tašmajdan Stadium in Belgrade, coinciding with the release of the single "Omen." The concert attracted a crowd of 10,000, among them Lepa Brena and Nataša Bekvalac, while Coby joined Senidah on stage to perform "4 strane sveta". On 1 October 2024, Senidah released "Phuket". The music video version of the track contained only non-lyrical vocals, while the lyrical version was released to streaming services.

On 17 February 2025, Senidah revealed the cover and tracklist for her third solo studio album Sen i dah. The same evening, she uploaded her Tašmajdan concert on YouTube in its entirety, coupling it with the release of a live album format on streaming services under the title Live from Belgrade. Sen i dah was released on 25 February 2025, featuring prior singles "Delija," "Alo alo," "Idi gade," "Omen," and "Phuket." On 17 March 2025, Senidah was revealed as the cover star of the spring issue of the Croatian edition of Elle. A day later, she released the music video for Sen i dah album track "Moj si high." The video, which was created by Bosnian computer engineer Damir Ličina, retells the Greek myth of Hades and Persephone through heavy use of artificial intelligence (AI). "Moj si high" debuted and peaked at number ten on Billboard's Croatia Songs chart. On 6 June 2025, Senidah released Sen i dah (Deluxe Edition) in the form of an extended play (EP). The EP contained two new tracks and reworked versions of the previously released singles "Greh" and "Dopamin." On 20 June 2025, Senidah released "Bandida," her first Spanish-language track, in collaboration with Mexican singer Adriel Favela. On 25 June 2025, the albums 25 by Marko Louis and Dar i kletva by Coby were released; they included duets with Senidah, "Bulbule" and "Siroče," respectively. On 16 July 2025, Senidah was revealed as the cover star of the summer issue of Vogue Adria. On 25 September 2025, the music video for "Bulbule" was released. Throughout the remainder of the year, Senidah continued her Sen i Dah Tour, visiting major cities of the former Yugoslavia, including Osijek's Gradski vrt Hall, Sarajevo's Skenderija, Split's Arena Gripe, Ljubljana's Arena Stožice, and Tuzla's Mejdan Hall. On 19 December 2025, Senidah released the 1980s-inspired single "Ti i ja" along with a music video. On New Year's Eve, Senidah performed at the Belgrade Waterfront, in front of the Belgrade Tower, alongside Goca Tržan, Aleksandra Radović, and the trumpet duo Boban and Marko Marković.

In 2026, Senidah continued her concert tour, including a show held on 28 February at Novi Sad's SPENS. On 14 March 2026, Senidah was a guest performer at Adi Šoše's concert at Belgrade's Sava Centar, where they premiered their unreleased duet "Čista ljubav". The song was released, along with a music video, on 27 March 2026. On 30 April 2026, Senidah was featured on "Love Machine", an English-language single from Slovenian group Laibach's studio album Musick, which was released the next day. Earlier that month, she announced concerts at Arena Zagreb, titled Welcome to My World, and Arena Zenica for 10 October 2026 and 30 October 2026, respectively. In early May 2026, Senidah performed at the Vogue Adria Second Anniversary Event, accompanied by a symphony orchestra. On 22 May 2026, Senidah released a three-track EP U meni je sunce. That same evening, she held her first of three consecutive concerts at the Sava Centar, with two following shows on 23 and 25 May. On 3 July 2026, Coby and Senidah released "Sexy", the lead single from their collaborative album Van vremena. On 14 August 2026, Senidah released her second Spanish-language single, "Amor".

== Artistry ==
When asked who would be her American counterpart, Senidah named Alicia Keys "because of her emotion," Mary J. Blige "because of her aggression," and Chris Brown "because of his stage presence." Known for her unique vocal color, Senidah told reporters that she was hoarse even as a baby, which resulted in the voice she has today: "My mom's coworkers always thought I was a boy because of the way my voice sounded." She revealed that when her longtime collaborator Cazzafura first heard her sing, he appreciated that she did not "chirp like a bird" like most Slovenian female singers, comparing her deep voice to that of Toni Braxton. She told Telegraf in 2024 that until she released her single "Replay" (2021), she felt that the public didn't believe she could sing well. Regarding her own performance style, she said: "On stage I love the freedom to experiment. I feel like Wonder Woman on stage."

Senidah expressed her resistance to being pigeonholed into genres, which are strictly delineated in the former Yugoslavia: "You're either folk or pop. I don't want to be either. Neither one—I want to be something else entirely. I love mixing. Someone once said I'm like Šemsa from New York, which I really liked." She is noted for blending contemporary R&B with Balkan folk music. She expressed her love of sevdalinka—stating that her favorite sevdalinka song is "Zapjevala sojka ptica," and adding that she loves her stage name because it reminds her of the word "sevdah"—as well as her fascination with Bosnian sevdalinka musician Božo Vrećo. Senidah also named Dino Merlin her influence, pointing out that he "gave her a lot both as a musician and a soul she can feel."

Senidah credited her late mother as her main songwriting inspiration, and stated that she prefers to compose melodies because "the emotion is strongest in them." Talking about the idiosyncratic syntax and archaic vocabulary that her lyricism is known for, Senidah said: "I truly love that entire heritage, those beautiful words. All languages [i.e. varieties of Serbo-Croatian] have gorgeous words—and they should be used. From every language, take the most beautiful. When I worked only in Slovenian, I didn't have access to all those words—for thirty‑odd years I couldn't express myself like that, but I always looked forward to it, all those sevdalinka words I grew up with. It's beautiful. Why not put only the most beautiful words in songs?"

== Public image ==
Throughout life I often felt I belonged nowhere—like people thought, "you're not one of ours." It's true: I didn't have a Slovenian name, though I'm from Slovenia. I have a Bosnian name, though I'm not from there. My roots are from Montenegro. As a child I often visited relatives in Macedonia, but I also feel at home in Serbia. Over time I realized it's my greatest advantage. It shaped my music.

— Senidah for Vogue Adria, 2025

Senidah is notable for her rapid rise to fame and critical acclaim in the former Yugoslavia. Zvonimir Milaković of Story.hr credited her for "starting a new music wave with her song 'Slađana.'" She is known for her specific vocals and singing style, with Novosti's Lujo Parežanin dubbing her a "terrifically convincing singer, so [convincing] that the majority of regional pop scene seems like a group of amateur singers after her," as well as for her extravagant and androgynous appearance. Her fame in the former Yugoslavia led Red Bull's Vojkan Bećir to characterize her as "what once were Brena or Čola." Furthermore, due to her biographical "Yugoslav-Balkan arc: a Slovenian musician whose parents are Montenegrin Bosniaks, and whose music is released by [Belgrade-based] Bassivity," Parežanin stated that "she is not just a performer who happens to be extremely popular in the region [...] – this destroyed and tortured region of ours belongs to her." Miloš Dašić of City Magazine described Senidah as a "product of the pop culture of this region over the past 50 years. [...] Senidah has become the music all people listen to. Our people, right here. Senidah is both Lepa Brena and Darkwood Dub."

Vogue Adria's Tara Đukić wrote: "From her first solo appearance after leaving the funk band Muff, it was clear that Senidah was taking a new turn — aesthetically, musically, and conceptually — one rooted in the legacy of '90s kitsch. Yet in her music, she boldly plays with those Balkan codes in her own unique way. Ethno sounds like soul, trap and R&B become mainstream, and as she blends and unites seemingly incompatible genres, she refuses to be placed into any category." Đukić further stated that, after Bez Tebe, "Dođi" was "more a confirmation than a turning point—a sign that it was time to take her seriously—while [Za Tebe], written in collaboration with voices like Bojana Vunturišević and poet Radmila Petrović, became a kind of feminist manifesto."

== Personal life ==
While answering fans' questions on the show Nešto drugačije, Senidah was asked about her sexuality to which she replied: "I love people. I don't look at who they are or what they are. It is only important that I find you okay and that's it. I love good people. Uncorrupted people." The response sparked debates about the singer's possible bisexuality. In an interview with the Serbian edition of Hello!, she said that rumours about her sexuality do not bother her and that she's "in an emotional relationship with music." Senidah implied her bisexuality once again in a 2024 interview with Nova.rs. In 2025, on the show Metar moga sela, she revealed her late mother had once asked her if she was a lesbian.

On 15 May 2021, amidst the 2021 Israel–Palestine crisis, Senidah criticized the Government of Slovenia on Instagram for expressing support to Israel by hanging its flag on the Government Building alongside the flags of Slovenia and the European Union, stating that she was ashamed to be a Slovenian citizen. At her Skenderija concert on 1 August 2025, Senidah raised the flag of Palestine on stage, calling the audience to hear the Palestinians' plea for help amidst the Gaza Strip famine. In December 2025, she endorsed Slovenia's boycott of the Eurovision Song Contest 2026 due to the European Broadcasting Union (EBU)'s decision to allow Israel to continue competing.

In January 2023, Dnevni avaz reported, based on police findings from intercepted Sky communications, that Admir "Šmrk" Arnautović had allegedly planned to have Senidah "beaten, wounded or have acid thrown on her face". In August 2026, the Prosecutor's Office of Bosnia and Herzegovina indicted Arnautović and Adnan "Magla" Maglić, who had previously been convicted of drug trafficking, alleging that they had planned to cause Senidah serious bodily injuries.

== Discography ==
Studio albums

- Bez tebe (2019)
- Za tebe (2022)
- Sen i dah (2025)
- Van vremena (with Coby; TBA)

== Awards and nominations ==
Year	Award	Category	Nominee/work	Result	Ref.
2019	Music Awards Ceremony	Hip-hop/Rap Song of the Year	"Slađana"	Won	
2019	RTV Pink	New Regional Star	Herself	Won	
2020	Music Awards Ceremony	Alternative Pop Song of the Year	"Crno srce"	Nominated	
2020	Music Awards Ceremony	Trap Song of the Year	"Mišići"	Won	
2020	Music Awards Ceremony	Music Video of the Year	"Mišići"	Nominated	
2020	Music Awards Ceremony	Golden MAC for Authenticity	Herself	Won	
2022	Jana Story Hall of Fame	Best Duet	"Dođi"	Won	
2023	Music Awards Ceremony	Female Trap Song of the Year	"Fama"	Nominated	
2023	Music Awards Ceremony	Urban Pop Song of the Year	"Behute"	Nominated	
2023	Music Awards Ceremony	Viral Song of the Year	"Behute"	Nominated	
