= Nataša Vojnović =

Bosnian Serb model (born 1979)

- Наташа Војновић
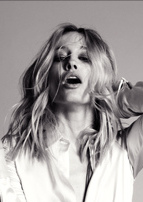
- Born: 28 August 1979 (age 47); Brčko, SR Bosnia and Herzegovina, SFR Yugoslavia
- Modeling information
- Height: 5 ft 9.5 in (1.77 m)
- Hair color: Blonde
- Eye color: Light Brown
- Agency: Women Management (New York, Milan); Elite Model Management (Paris); The Hive Management (London); View Management (Barcelona); Modelwerk (Hamburg); Munich Models (Munich); MP Stockholm (Stockholm)

Nataša Vojnović (Serbian Cyrillic: Наташа Војновић, pronounced [nǎtaʃa ʋɔ̂jnɔʋitɕ]; born 28 August 1979) is a Bosnian Serb model, who participated in the Elite Model Look of 1996.

== Early life ==
Nataša was born on 28 August 1979 in Brčko, SFR Yugoslavia. At the age of 12, she fled from the war in Bosnia and moved to Belgrade,SremčicaSerbia.

== Elite Model Look and career ==
Vojnović entered the Elite Model Look of FR Yugoslavia in 1996. She won the semifinals, earning her the right to represent her country during the finals in Nice, France. She entered in the Top 15 in the final, but lost to Ukrainian contestant Diana Kovalchuk.

She started her modeling job when she signed with NEXT Model Management in 1999. She was then ushered to Paris and Milan to make her first fashion show appearance in the Spring Fendi and Balenciaga shows. Her first campaign was for Chanel Accessories, shot by Karl Lagerfeld. Her career continued to build momentum, booking editorials for Vogue Italia, i-D (her first magazine cover), and was twice on the cover of British Vogue. In 2000, Nataša signed a contract with Calvin Klein, after she dyed her original blonde hair for red locks. She continued her career, booking campaigns for Aquascutum, Blumarine, Chanel, Gucci, Stella McCartney, Sonia Rykiel, and Yves Saint Laurent. She also has walked the runway for international designers like Christian Dior and Christian Lacroix. In 2010, 2012 and 2014, Vojnović appeared on the cover of Serbian Elle. In March 2024, she appeared on the cover of the first ever issue of Vogue Adria.
