= Slađan =

Slađan is a Serbian and Croatian given name. Notable people with the name include:

- Slađan Ašanin (born 1971), Croatian footballer
- Slađan Đukić (born 1966), Serbian footballer
- Slađan Ilić (born 1969), Yugoslav alpine skier
- Slađan Nikodijević (born 1990), Serbian footballer
- Slađan Nikolić (born 1974), Serbian footballer
- Sladan Peric (born 1982), Danish footballer
- Slađan Radovanović (born 1964), Serbian politician
- Slađan Spasić (born 1973), Serbian footballer
- Slađan Šćepović (born 1965), Serbian football manager

== See also ==
- Slađana, feminine form
