= Slađana (song) =

2018 debut single by Senidah

Single by Senidah

from the album Bez Tebe
- Language: Serbian
- Released: 12 March 2018
- Genre: trap; R&B
- Length: 2:56
- Label: Bassivity Digital
- Composers: Anže Kacafura; Senida Hajdarpašić
- Lyricist: Benjamin Krnetić
- Producer: Cazzafura

Senidah singles chronology
| "Slađana" (2018) | "Belo" (2018) |

Music video
- "Slađana" on YouTube

"Slađana" (often stylized as "Sladjana"; a feminine given name) is a debut solo single by Slovenian recording artist Senidah and the lead single off her debut solo album Bez Tebe. It was released on 12 March 2018 and was a sleeper hit. The song, sung in Serbian, marked Senidah's breakthrough to the mainstream and fame. Retrospectively, the song was credited for "starting a new musical wave" in former Yugoslavia.

== Background ==
Senidah said she "wanted to try singing in a different language to see what it sounds like", since she had already made music in Slovene and English, and that she did not aim for commercial success – the sole purpose of making the song was just because she "was able to". She told Vogue Adria's Teodora Jeremić: "I worked with the band Muff, and I always had to adapt the sound—make it fit with all of us, not be too strong. Then one day Cazzafura played me the beat, and when I heard it, I knew—it was something inside me that hadn't been able to come out until then. We released the song, and for days nothing happened. And I gave it my all."

The music video was released on 4 March. It was noticed by Slobodan Veljković Coby, the CEO of popular Belgrade-based label Bassivity Digital, who liked the song. A couple of days later, he searched for the video again and was surprised by how few views it had so he contacted the artist and offered a reupload to the label's YouTube channel. Senidah hesitated for a while but eventually she agreed. She told Jeremić: "Then, it exploded—everyone called me. I didn't want to sign with anyone, I wanted to stay with my team from Ljubljana, I wanted them to be part of this story I was beginning, and I knew I wanted it to be bigger."

== Music and lyrics ==
Sonically, the single is a mid-tempo R&B song with trap influences. It features the artist rap-singing the second verse and singing the first one and the chorus.

Every time Senidah was asked about the lyrics' meaning, she was mysterious and kept giving partial and unclear answers. She said that the song "hides a strong person who, just like everyone else, gets lost sometimes, although it seems that no one can do anything to them". On a different occasion, she said: "Slađana is a woman who has everything but has nothing". There is a belief the song's lyrics are about amphetamine since "Slađana" is a Slovene slang for it. On one occasion, when asked about the lyrics, Senidah jokingly responded that the lyricist Benjamin Krnetić was in love with Serbian new wave singer Slađana Milošević.

In an interview while doing a photo shoot for a Cockta ad, two years after the release, Senidah said "Who is Slađana?" is a question everybody asks her but she wishes they wouldn't.

== Music video ==
Music video was re-uploaded to Bassivity Digital's YouTube channel on 11 March, a day before the song's digital release. It is directed by Žiga Radulj.

The video consists of four main scenes. The first one depicts Senidah in a dark studio dressed in silver clothes and filmed through see-through plastic. The second one depicts Senidah near a railway sitting on an engine cover of a black Mercedes-Benz G-Class dressed in all red and accompanied by four men in black with covered faces. The third one depicts Senidah dressed in all white performing the song in a city basketball playground accompanied by a large group of men in black, this time with their faces uncovered. The fourth scene depicts Senidah sitting at a table covered by stacks of euros in a dimly lit room full of smoke, starring as a mobster dressed in silver clothes and a white fur coat with short black hair, smoking a cigar and drinking whiskey; she's accompanied by a seminude woman counting money with her face covered by a scarf.

Outdoor scenes are filmed during a cloudy day, presumably in a Slovenian city during late winter, and they're influenced by stereotypical imagery of the former Yugoslav countries consisted of ghettos, gangs, feeling of insecurity, poverty and post-war recovery.

== Commercial performance ==
In less than a month of being released, the music video was viewed three million times on YouTube. As of 21 April 2020, it is viewed more than 50 million times and is her third most viewed video on the platform.

As of 24 July 2019, "Slađana" garnered three million streams on Spotify and is Senidah's first track to do so.

== Awards and nominations ==
| Year | Ceremony | Category | Result | Ref. |
|---|---|---|---|---|
| 2019 | Music Awards Ceremony | Hip-Hop/Rap Song of the Year | Won | |
