= Đole Đogani =

Serbian singer and dancer (born 1960)

Đole Đogani Ђоле Ђогани
- Also known as: Đorđe Đogani
- Born: Hamit Đogaj; 1 July 1960 (age 66); Belgrade, PR Serbia, FPR Yugoslavia
- Genres: Pop-folk; Eurodance
- Occupations: Singer; dancer; choreographer
- Instrument: Vocals
- Years active: 1991–present
- Labels: ZaM; City Records; BN Music; Grand Production
- Member of: Đogani
- Spouse: Slađa Delibašić (m. 1986; div. 2001)
- Partner(s): Vesna Trivić (2001–present)

Đorđe "Đole" Đogani (Serbian Cyrillic: Ђорђе "Ђоле" Ђогани; born Hamit Đogaj, Albanian: Hamit Gjogaj, on 1 July 1960) is a Serbian former competitive disco dancer, present day singer and founder of the music duo Đogani.

== Biography ==
Đorđe Đogani was born Hamit Đogaj on July 1, 1960, in Belgrade, SR Serbia, SFR Yugoslavia to Serbian Albanian parents. He grew up in the neighborhood of Mirijevo alongside three brothers and three sisters. His youngest brother, Gazmen "Gagi" Đogani, is also a well-known 90s dancer and founder of the music act called Funky G. An active sportsman in his youth, Đogani was a member of AK Crvena Zvezda and was a junior representative of Yugoslavia in athletics.

Đogani started dancing in 1979. In the early 80s he became involved as the choreographer and got his own dance troupe at the Belgrade Youth Center. He was the only competitor from Yugoslavia at the WORLD Disco Dancing Championship in 1980, where he was placed seventh.

In 1986, he married Slađa Delibašić, with whom he has two daughters. The couple founded Giogani Fantastico in the early 90s. Together they released six studio albums.

Following his divorce from Delibašić in 2001, Đogani started dating dancer Vesna Trivić, who became the new member of the group, now called Đogani. With Trivić he released seven more albums. They have two children of their own and are not legally married.

== Discography ==
As Giogani Fantastiko

- Storm (1992)
- Idemo na Mars (1994)
- Pronađi sebe (1996)
- Granice nema (1997)
- Bensedin (1998)
- Da, to je to! (2000)

As Đogani

- Novi dan (2001)
- Dok ja ljubim (2003)
- Đogani 2005 (2005)
- Ljubav moja (2007)
- Svila (2009)
- Đogani 2015 (2015; reissued in 2016)
- Original (2024)
