= Daljine =

Studio album by Bojana Vunturišević
- Released: April 21, 2017
- Studio: Studio 3000 (Belgrade, Serbia)
- Genre: Electropop; synthpop
- Length: 34:38
- Label: Mascom Records; Bassivity Digital
- Producer: Ivan Mirković Bambi

Bojana Vunturišević chronology
/ (/)	Daljine (2017)	Ljubav (2023)

Singles from Daljine
- 1. "Kese, etikete" Released: March 10, 2017

Daljine (transl. Distances) is the debut solo studio album by Serbian singer-songwriter Bojana Vunturišević. Released on April 21, 2017, under Mascom Records, it was announced with the release of its lead single "Kese, etikete" on March 10, 2017. Daljine represents her first body of work since Vunturišević parted her ways with the band Svi na pod! and pursued a solo career. The production on Daljine was handled by Vunturišević's past band member, Ivan Mirković Bambi.

Daljine received positive reviews from music critics. On 29 April, the album was promoted with a live show at the Bitef theater in Belgrade.

== Critical reception ==
Professional ratings
Review scores
Source	Rating
Balkanrock	7/10 stars
Muzika.hr	4/5 stars

In a four out of five star review, Siniša Miklaužić from Muzika.hr wrote that Vunturišević stayed true to her electropop roots with Svi na pod!, which can be best seen on the track "Bes". However, according to him, Daljine was more lyrics-focused than her previous work with the band. Miklaužić was particularly favorable of the track "Kese, etikete", compering the "contemporary electropop" sound to the music of New Zealand singer Lorde. Moreover, the critic highlighted the social commentary in the songs "Kese, etikete" and "E70". Ultimately, Miklaužić stated: "At her debut, Bojana showed that she understands extremely well who her audience is and how she should present herself to them".

Balkanrock enlisted Daljine among the top 30 best regional releases from 2017, while Muzika.hr placed the album at number two on their review of 2017.

== Track listing ==
All tracks are written by Bojana Vunturišević.

Daljine track listing
No.	Title	Writer(s)	Length
1.	"Kese, etikete" (Bags, Labels)	Minja Bogavac; Ivan Mirković Bambi	3:46
2.	"Amy & Blake"	Bogavac; Mirković	4:08
3.	"Bes" (Anger)	Bogavac; Mirković	3:28
4.	"Daljine" (Distances)	Mirković	4:52
5.	"Noćni program" (Night Program)	Maša Seničić	4:34
6.	"Sada žurim" (Now I'm in a Hurry)		3:44
7.	"Suzana"	Bogavac; Jamal Al Kiswani	3:54
8.	"Vetar u kosi" (Wind in Hair)	Bogavac; Mirković	3:28
9.	"E70" (feat. Žene Kose)	Bogavac	2:41
Total length:			34:38

== Personnel ==
Musicians

- Bojana Vunturišević - lead vocals, keyboards
- Andrijana Belović - background vocals
- Anjuta Janković - background vocals
- Marija Stojanović - background vocals
- Milica Tegeltija - background vocals
- Minja Bogavac - background vocals
- Nebojša Zulfikarpašić Keba - guitar
- Ivan Mirković Bambi - guitar, keyboards
- Jamal Al Kiswani - saxophone

Technical

- Ivan Mirković Bambi - production
- Marko Kon - mastering
- Bojana Vunturišević - arrangement

Art

- Milica Mrvić - photography, design

== Release history ==
Daljine release history
Region	Date	Format	Label	Ref.
Serbia	21 April 2017	CD	Mascom Records	
Various	21 April 2017	Digital download; streaming	Bassivity Digital	
