= Kamikaza =

2019 single by Jala Brat and Buba Corelli

Single by Jala Brat and Buba Corelli featuring Senidah

from the album Alfa & Omega
- Language: Bosnian
- English title: Kamikaze
- Released: 15 August 2019
- Genre: dancehall; hip hop; EDM
- Length: 2:37
- Label: Imperia
- Songwriters: Jasmin Fazlić; Amar Hodžić
- Producer: RimDa

Jala Brat singles chronology
"Bebi" (2019)	"Kamikaza" (2019)	"99" (2019)

Buba Corelli singles chronology
"Bebi" (2019)	"Kamikaza" (2019)	"Karantin" (2020)

Senidah singles chronology
"202" (2019)	"Kamikaza" (2019)	"100%" (2019)

Music video
- "Kamikaza" on YouTube

"Kamikaza" (pronounced [kamikǎːza]; transl. "Kamikaze") is a song by Bosnian rappers Jala Brat and Buba Corelli, featuring Slovenian singer-songwriter Senidah. It was released as a single on 15 August 2019 by Sarajevo-based label Imperia. It was written by the rappers themselves and produced by RimDa. It was released as the last single off the rappers' collaborative album Alfa & Omega.

== Background ==
Senidah revealed a collaboration with Jala and Buba was in works on the 2019 Music Awards Ceremony red carpet. The music video was surprise released on 13 August, three hours ahead of "Born in Ghetto" concert at Skenderija that all three artists took part in alongside other stars like RAF Camora, Coby, Goga Sekulić, Baka Prase etc. The song was digitally released two days later.

== Music video ==
Music video was premiered two days before the single released. It was directed by Ljubba Stefanović.

It was taken by front cameras and edited so that it looks like Instagram stories and heavily features Instagram effects. It depicts artists dancing and singing along to the song.

== Commercial performance ==
The song was a great commercial success. As of 21 February 2020, the song has garnered 4 million streams on Spotify. As of 22 September 2021, the music video has accumulated over 108 million views on YouTube.

It has as well spent two weeks on Austrian charts, reaching the peak of 42.

== Track listing ==
Digital download
No.	Title	Length
1.	"Kamikaza"	2:37

== Charts ==
=== Weekly charts ===
Chart	Peak position
Austria (Ö3 Austria Top 75)	42
