= Ljubav =

Ljubav may refer to:

- Ljubav (Ekatarina Velika album), 1987
- Ljubav (Nina Badrić album), 2003
- Ljubav (Trigger album), 2007
- Ljubav (Bojana Vunturišević album), 2023
