= Slađana =

Slađana (pronounced [slǎdʑana]) may refer to:

- Slađana Božović, Serbian beauty pageant contestant
- Slađana Bulatović, Montenegrin football player
- Slađana Slađa Delibašić, Serbian singer
- Slađana Đurić, Serbian scientist
- Slađana Erić, Serbian volleyball player
- Slađana Golić, Serbian basketball player
- Slađana Slađa Guduraš, Bosnian Serb singer
- Slađana Milošević, Serbian singer
- Slađana Mirković, Serbian volleyball player
- Slađana Perunović, Montenegrin long-distance runner
- Slađana Pop-Lazić, Serbian handball player
- Slađana Topić, Bosnian handball player

== See also ==
- Slađan, masculine form
