= Slađa Delibašić =

Serbian singer and dancer (born 1968)

Slađa Delibašić Слађа Делибашић
- Also known as: Slađa Đogani; Slađa D.
- Born: Slađana Delibašić; 7 November 1968 (age 57); Kosovska Mitrovica, SR Serbia, SFR Yugoslavia
- Genres: Pop-folk; dance-pop
- Occupations: Singer; dancer
- Instrument: Vocals
- Years active: 1991–present
- Labels: City Records
- Formerly of: Giogani Fantastico
- Spouse: Đorđe Đogani (m. 1986; div. 2001) Milan Pejović (m. 2014; div. 2015)

Slađana "Slađa" Delibašić (Serbian Cyrillic: Слађана "Слађа" Делибашић; born 7 November 1968), also known as Slađa D., is a Serbian singer and dancer. Born in Kosovska Mitrovica, she gained popularity in the 90s alongside her then-husband, Đorđe Đogani, as members of the Europop and turbo-folk act Giogani Fantastico.

Following their divorce in 2001, she pursued a solo career. Delibašić has released six solo albums to date under City Records. Some of her biggest hits include "Sedmi sprat" (2007), "Ajmo sad u provod" (2009), "5 minuta" (2010) and "Dizel Power" (2010).

Delibašić and her than-partner, Igor Matić were also the runner-ups of the first season of the reality television show Parovi (2010–2011).

She has two daughters with Đogani, named Silvija and Marinela.

== Discography ==
Studio albums

- Šesto čulo (2001)
- Zauvek kraljica ritma (2002)
- Nekad i sad (2004)
- Baš to… (2007)
- 5 (2010)
- Unikat (2011)

== Filmography ==
Filmography of Slađana Delibašić
Year	Title	Genre	Role	Notes
2010-2011	Parovi	Television	Herself	Season 1; 2nd place
2017	Istine i laži	Television	Herself	One episode
