= Ljubav (Bojana Vunturišević album) =

Studio album by Bojana Vunturišević
- Released: February 11, 2023
- Studio: Belgrade, Serbia
- Genre: Pop
- Length: 32:42
- Label: Bassivity Digital
- Producer: Luxonee; Coby; Ivan Mirković

Bojana Vunturišević chronology
Daljine (2017)	Ljubav (2023)

Alternative cover

Singles from Ljubav
- 1. "Money" Released: May 30, 2021; 2. "Madrina" Released: July 1, 2022; 3. "Ljubav" Released: December 23, 2022

Ljubav (transl. Love) is the second studio album by Serbian singer-songwriter Bojana Vunturišević, released by Bassivity Digital on February 11, 2023. Ljubav was initially announced as Sama (transl. Alone) in February 2020. Vunturišević co-wrote the album, while the production was handled by her former Svi na Pod! bandmate Ivan Mirković Bambi, Luka Jovanović Luxonee and Slobodan Veljković Coby.

According to Vunturišević, the album was creatively influenced by the loss of her father, the COVID-19 pandemic and the copyright infringement lawsuit with her previous label. Lyrically, Ljubav explores the artist's different perspectives on love. The album was preceded by three singles: "Money" (2021), "Madrina" and "Ljubav" (2022).

== Background ==
Professional ratings
Review scores
Source	Rating
Muzika.hr	4/5 stars

Following the release of her debut album Daljine under Mascom Records in 2017, Vunturišević released a standalone single, titled "Promašaj", in June 2019 through Bassivity Digital. The single was subsequently taken off the music platforms by company Tim Drum Music, which is associated with Mascom and is supposed to represent artist's copyright. Subsequently, Vunturišević stated that TDM was negligent with her music and enforced censorship on her work outside Mascom, which made her take a break from releasing music.

After eventually reaching a settlement with TDM in March 2020, Vunturišević made her comeback with the release of the album's lead single "Money" in May 2021 through Bassivity Digital. The single was released alongside a music video, which was directed by Ivan Stojiljković. Vunturišević described it as the biggest production experience in her career so far. The video displays images of opulence, which correspond to the song's lyrics and Vunturišević's concept of "capitalistic blues".

Subsequently, in June 2022, "Madrina" was presented at the Skale pop music festival in Herceg Novi. The album's title track, "Ljubav", was released as the third single in December of the following year. The song samples "Počnimo ljubav ispočetka" by jazz singer Beti Đorđević. "Ljubav" was enlisted by Balkanrock among the top 10 regional singles of 2022. Nikola Stojanović directed the music video for the single, which features scenes from her hometown Kostolac and recordings of her parents' wedding, symbolizing the sense of community and the idea of "pure love".

== Promotion ==
On 30 March, Vunturišević performed at the MENT showcase festival in Ljubljana, Slovenia. The music video for the track "Care", directed by Nikola Stojanović, was released on 8 April. It showcases a relationship breakup through depiction of traditional mourning rituals native to Serbia. The video has been described as the "juncture of tradition and pop culture" by Nova.rs. On April 12 and 13, Vunturišević held sold-out shows at the Belgrade Youth Center.

== Track listing ==
All tracks are written by Bojana Vunturišević.

Ljubav track listing
No.	Title	Writer(s)	Length
1.	"Ljubav" (Love)	Slobodan Veljković Coby	2:55
2.	"Gde si sad" (Where Are You Now)	Luka Jovanović Luxonee; Minja Bogavac	3:47
3.	"Madrina" (Godmother)	Ivan Mirković Bambi	3:40
4.	"Care" ([Hey] Tzar)	Luxonee	2:58
5.	"Sama" (Alone)	Mirković; Bogavac	3:59
6.	"Ramba"	Luxonee	2:30
7.	"Money"	Coby; Milan Laća Radulović	2:39
8.	"Dom" (Home)	Luxonee; Maša Seničić	4:03
9.	"Solita" (Solo Girl)	Luxonee	2:43
10.	"Svemirska ljubav" (Space Love)	Coby; Luxonee	3:24
Total length:			32:42

== Personnel ==
=== Musicians ===
- Bojana Vunturišević - lead vocals
- Andrijana Belović - background vocals (1)
- Anjuta Janković - background vocals (1)
- Milica Tegeltija - background vocals (1)
- Mina Tegeltija - background vocals (1)
- Katarina Mitić - background vocals (1)
- Tamara Novaković - background vocals (1)
- Ivana Peters - background vocals (2)
- Daria Hodnik - background vocals (10)
- Peđa Militinović - drums (1)
- Ivan Mirković Bambi - bass guitar (1, 3), guitar (2)
- Vuk Starinac - bass guitar (1)
- Miloš Nikolić - trumpet (1)

=== Technical ===
- Luka Jovanović Luxonee - production (all tracks)
- Slobodan Veljković Coby - production (1, 4, 7, 10)
- Ivan Mirković Bambi - production (3, 5)

=== Art ===
- Mladen Teofilović - photography
- Milica Kolarić - creative director

== Release history ==
Ljubav release history
Region	Date	Format	Label	Ref.
Various	11 February 2023	Digital download; streaming	Bassivity Digital	
