= Đogani =

Serbian dance music duo

- Origin: Belgrade, Serbia
- Genres: Turbo-folk; Eurodance
- Years active: 1993–present
- Labels: ZaM; City Records; BN Music; Grand Production
- Members: Đorđe Đogani; Vesna Trivić
- Past members: Slađa Delibašić

Đogani (Serbian Cyrillic: Ђогани), formerly known as Giogani Fantastico, is a Serbian turbo-folk and Eurodance duo from Belgrade, founded in the early 90s. The group was originally composed of the married couple Đorđe Đogani and Slađana Delibašić. Following their divorce in 2001, Giogani Fantastico rebranded as Đogani, consisted of Đorđe Đogani and his new girlfriend, Vesna Trivić.

They have released twelve studio albums to date, as well as numerous standalone singles and EPs. Some of best known songs of Đogani include: "Idemo na Mars" (1994), "Leto je" (1995), "Čekaj me kod kolima" (2005), "Znam ja", "Nema više cile mile" (2007) featuring Mile Kitić, "Gljiva ludara", "Ajmo sad u provod" (2009) and "Srce mi je zastalo" (2013).

The duo has also been associated with Đogani's brothers Andrija Đogani - Baki B3 and Gagi Đogani from Funky G.

== Discography ==
As Giogani Fantastiko

- Storm (1993)
- Idemo na Mars (1994)
- Pronađi sebe (1996)
- Granice nema (1997)
- Bensedin (1998)
- Da, to je to! (2000)

As Đogani

- Novi dan (2001)
- Dok ja ljubim (2003)
- Đogani 2005 (2005)
- Ljubav moja (2007)
- Svila (2009)
- Đogani 2015 (2015; reissued in 2016)
- Original (2024)
