= Bojana Vunturišević =

Serbian singer and songwriter (born 1985)

Bojana Vunturišević Бојана Вунтуришевић
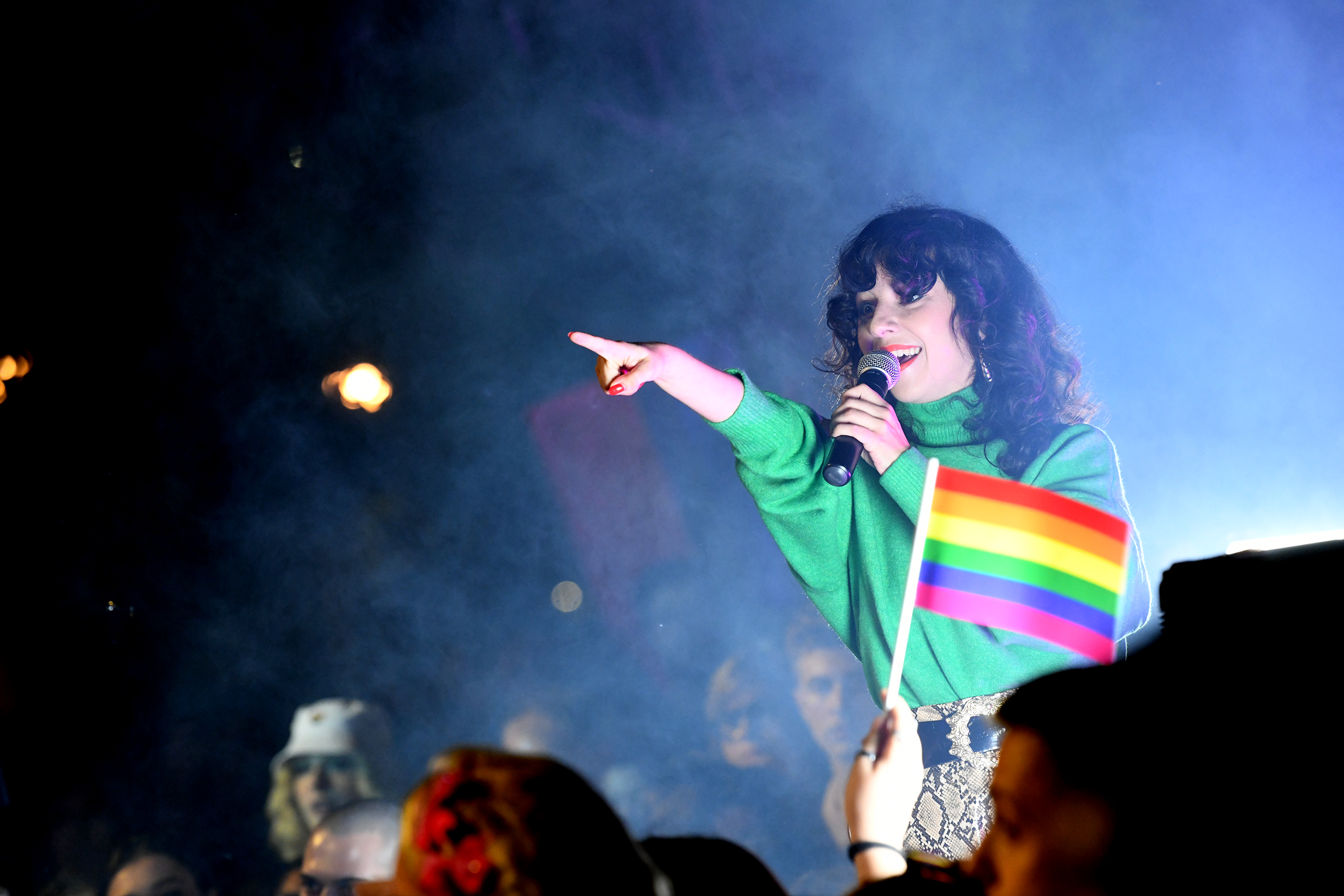
- Vunturišević at the 2021 Belgrade Pride

Background information
- Born: 6 March 1985 (age 41); Požarevac, SR Serbia, SFR Yugoslavia
- Genres: Pop
- Occupations: Singer; songwriter
- Years active: 2003-present
- Labels: Mascom; Bassivity Digital

Bojana Vunturišević (Serbian Cyrillic: Бојана Вунтуришевић; born 6 March 1985) is a Serbian singer-songwriter. Born in Požarevac and raised in Kostolac, she rose to prominence as the lead singer of Svi na pod!. Since pursuing a solo career in 2015, Vunutrišević has released two critically acclaimed albums: Daljine (2017) and Ljubav (2023). Additionally, she has written hit-singles for other prominent regional artists, such as Nataša Bekvalac, Sara Jo, Senidah, Franka and Seka Aleksić.

== Career ==
=== Beginnings with bands ===
Vunturišević began her professional music career as a member of underground bands The Root Out and MistakeMistake. She gained popularity alongside Svi na pod!, which was founded in 2007. After releasing two albums with the band: Prvi (2011) and Mladost (2014), she decided to pursue a solo career in 2015.

=== Solo career ===
On 21 April 2017, Vunturišević released her critically acclaimed debut solo album Daljine under Mascom Records. It was preceded by the single "Kese, etikete". As a part of her album tour, she held a concert at the Belgrade Youth Center on 19 May 2018. In June the following year, Vunturišević began collaborating with Bassivity Digital through which she released "Promašaj". The single was subsequently taken off music platforms alongside "Mili mili" by Sara Jo, which had been written by Vunturišević, by company Tim Drum Music (TDM). Two months later, she made a statement accusing TDM, which was supposed to represent her copyright, of being negligent with her music and also of censoring her work outside Mascom Records, whom the company is associated with. Due to legal issues, Vunturišević took a hiatus from releasing music until she reached a settlement with TDM in March 2020 and officially parted her ways with Mascom.

In September 2022, Vunturišević performed at Tašmajdan Hall during the EuroPride manifestation, hosted in Belgrade. On 11 February 2023, she released her second album Ljubav under Bassivity Digital. It produced three singles: "Money" (2021), "Madrina" and the title track (2022). To promote the album, Vunturišević held two sold-out shows at the Belgrade Youth Center on April 12 and 13, 2023.

== Artistry ==
Vunturišević describes her musical style as "capitalist blues", which originated from the review of her song "Kese, etikete" by Serbian music publicist and critic Žikica Simić. Her music draws influences from indie pop, trip hop and dancehall. In 2023, Muzika.hr enlisted Vunturišević on their International Women's Day list of the "women who leave their mark on the regional music scene".

== Personal life ==
In 2014, Vunturišević started her own children's choir, named DFhor. In 2015, she graduated from the Faculty of Musical Arts at the University of Belgrade with a degree in music pedagogy. In 2017, Vunturišević signed the Declaration on the Common Language of the Croats, Serbs, Bosniaks and Montenegrins.

She has a son, born in 2016, with director Ivan Stojiljković.

== Discography ==
Studio albums

- Daljine (2017)
- Ljubav (2023)

== Awards and nominations ==
Year	Award	Category	Nominee/work	Result	Ref.
2019	Music Awards Ceremony	Breakthrough Act	Herself	Nominated	
