= Dođi =

2021 single by Dino Merlin and Senidah

Single by Dino Merlin and Senidah

from the album Mi
- Language: Bosnian
- English title: "Come"
- Released: 1 January 2021
- Genre: Folk-pop; world; trap
- Length: 4:53
- Label: Magaza Sarajevo; Croatia Records
- Songwriter: Edin Dervišhalidović
- Producer: Adis Sirbubalo

Dino Merlin singles chronology
"Mi" (2020)	"Dođi" (2021)	"Jedan dan, jedna noć" (2021)

Senidah singles chronology
"Viva Mahalla" (2020)	"Dođi" (2021)	"Deca techna" (2021)

Alternative cover

Music video
- "Dođi" on YouTube

"Dođi" (pronounced [dǒːdʑi]; transl. "Come") is a single by Bosnian singer-songwriter Dino Merlin and Slovenian singer-songwriter Senidah. It was released on 1 January 2021 by Magaza Sarajevo and Croatia Records as the second single off Merlin's seventh studio album Mi (2025). It was written solely by Merlin and produced by Adis Sirbubalo. Lyrically, the song deals with loneliness, insecurity, and anxiety. Accompanying music video was premiered during the last hours of 2020.

== Background and release ==
Rumours about Dervišhalidović and Senidah collaborating first broke out ahead of 2020 Music Awards Ceremony. When asked about it on the ceremony red carpet, Senidah denied the rumours.

Several months later, media reported about Dervišhalidović and Senidah filming the music video for their collaborative song in Istanbul, which Senidah once again denied, saying that she had never been in Turkey in her life. It was soon revealed that Merlin had finished recording his twelfth studio album, which was planned to be released in June.

In June 2020, media reported that the filming of the music video, set in Skenderija, Sarajevo, was halted by new COVID-19 pandemic measures.

In October 2020, Dervišhalidović released the lead single off the album, titled "Mi" (Us), to widespread critical acclaim and commercial success. On 18 December 2020, it was announced that Merlin would hold a virtual concert on New Year's Eve night, sponsored by BH Telecom and Samsung. On 29 December, both Merlin and Senidah took to Instagram to share a snippet of the music video and announce the release date.

== Writing and recording ==
The song was written after Dervišhalidović's Hotel Nacional Tour:

After long and exhausting Hotel Nacional Tour, I tried to find my peace, to take a break from the world and the people, so I decided to travel to a certain big city where I tried to come back to myself while running away from everyone else, only to find out that – I don't know how to be alone. That's how the first lyrics of this song were written, and Senidah was a perfect partner for this duet, as an echo and another voice.

When asked about the song, Senidah, who is known to idolize Merlin, stated:

A collaboration with Dino is a dream come true to me, it means everything to me, my heart is full when I listen to our voices together. I proved to myself once again that everything, that I want with my entire being and soul, is possible. This is real proof and motivation for the future. Nothing is impossible and now I feel free to continue dreaming.

== Reception ==
In July 2025, Tara Đukić or Vogue Adria wrote that "Dođi" was "more a confirmation than a turning point—a sign that it was time to take [Senidah] seriously". In April 2026, Oslobođenje included "Dođi" among the eight duets by Dino Merlin that marked the regional music scene: "A contemporary duet that combines different musical styles and generations. Collaboration with Senidah brought a more modern sound and new energy to his work."

=== Accolades ===
Year	Ceremony	Category	Result	Ref.
2022	Jana Story Hall of Fame	Best Duet	Won	

== Music video ==
The music video was released during last hours of 2020. It was uploaded to Dervišhalidović's YouTube channel during his virtual concert. It was directed by Slovenian visual artist and musician Kukla and filmed in Sarajevo and Lukomir.

When asked about the filming, Senidah stated:

This year was definitely different for all of us, time passed strangely and strange things occurred. We split the filming in several stages, and our energy would spread and strengthen every time. I also discovered gorgeous landscapes in Bosnia, met lovely people, and Dino kept me safe and made sure I didn't miss anything.

Within less than two hours, the music video accumulated more than 200,000 views.

== Track listing ==
Digital download
No.	Title	Length
1.	"Dođi"	4:53

== Credits and personnel ==
=== Track ===
- Dino Merlin – lead vocals, music, lyrics, production
- Senidah – lead vocals
- Adis Sirbubalo – arrangement, programming, keyboards
- Bojan Šalamon – additional programming, mixing
- Dino Šukalo – guitars
- Istanbul Strings – orchestration
- Mert Kemancı – orchestra arrangement
- Altuğ Öncü – oud
- Maya Sar – backing vocals
- Aida Mušanović Arsić – backing vocals
- Anže Kacafura – recording, editing
- Mahir Sarihodžić – recording, editing, mixing
- Ozan Bayraşa – recording, editing
- Chris Gehringer – mastering
- Mixed at Long Play Studio, Sarajevo and Rubikon Sound Factory, Zagreb
- Mastered at Sterling Sound, Edgewater

== Charts ==
Chart (2021)	Peak position
Croatia Domestic Airplay (Top lista)	22
