= Vogue Adria =

Fashion and lifestyle magazine

- Cover of the March 2024 launch issue, featuring Nataša Vojnović
- Editor: Milan Đačić
- Categories: Fashion
- Frequency: Monthly
- Publisher: Condé Nast; Media 3.0 Publishing
- First issue: 12 March 2024; 2 years ago
- Country: Bosnia and Herzegovina; Croatia; Montenegro; Serbia; Slovenia
- Language: Croatian; Serbian; Web edition: English; Slovene
- Website: vogueadria.com

Vogue Adria is the edition of the American fashion and lifestyle monthly magazine Vogue which serves the countries of Bosnia and Herzegovina, Croatia, Montenegro, Serbia, and Slovenia. The magazine is printed in Croatian and Serbian, while the online version is available in English and Slovene as well. The magazine has been in publication since March 2024. The editor-in-chief is Belgrade-based media mogul Milan Đačić.

== Background ==
The magazine's launch was announced in June 2023 by Condé Nast, the owner of Vogue, in collaboration with Media 3.0 Publishing, which was founded by Sonja Kovacs, Nenad Janjatović, and Milan Đačić.

Kovacs was the editor-in-chief of Elle Srbija and the regional editorial director of Elle, Men's Health, Cosmopolitan and National Geographic. Janjatović and Đačić were the creative director and fashion director, respectively, of Elle Srbija, while Đačić also was the editor-in-chief of Elle Man Srbija.

=== Editor-in-chief ===
Editor-in-chief	Start year	End year	Ref.
Milan Đačić	2023	present	

== History ==
In December 2023, Vogue Adria's creative team was announced. Đačić was elected editor-in-chief; Teodora Jeremić—an art historian, curator and editor—was elected director of publications; Nives Bokor was elected digital director; Petar Trbović was elected fashion director; Filip Koludrović was elected creative director; Dragana Krtinić was elected art director; Kristina Mikulić was elected beauty editor; Tina Kovačiček was elected lifestyle editor; Tina Lončar was elected fashion editor; Tena Razumović Žmara was elected culture editor, while Selena Ljubičanović and Jelena Madirazza became part of the marketing team.

The first issue of the magazine was published 12 March 2024, with the Serbian model Nataša Vojnović featured on the cover, photographed by Koludrović and dressed in an archival piece by Alber Elbaz. The issue bore the headline "Nova zora" ("A New Dawn"), a "phrase that sounds the same and has the same meaning in all Balkan countries".

The magazine was presented at a gala on 9 March, in the Belgrade Fair – Hall 1. The gala featured performances of the Zrenjanin Philharmonic Orchestra and choir, who performed "O Fortuna" from Carl Orff's Carmina Burana; Katarina Ranković, who performed folk songs "Bella ciao" and "Ederlezi" on a piano; and Rade Šerbedžija, who recited Tin Ujević's poem "Everyday Lamentations".

On 11 December 2024, the magazine organised the Vogue Adria Christmas Ballet, a performance of Pyotr Ilyich Tchaikovsky's The Nutcracker at the Croatian National Theatre in Zagreb. A humanitarian event, its goal was to raise funds for Zagreb's Classical Ballet School and Silvija Hercigonja Artistic Dance School.

Vogue Living Adria was launched in April 2025, dedicated to lifestyle and design. An event was organized in Milan during Salone del Mobile in collaboration with Asko. The debut issue was covered by Teget co-founders Ana Kraš and Ruben Moreira.

In March 2026, the magazine celebrated its second anniversary. To mark the milestone, it featured American actor Connor Storrie, a breakout star of the Canadian television series Heated Rivalry, on its cover and released a special collector's set pairing the issue with Rachel Reid's novel Heated Rivalry, on which the series is based. The novel also served as the first title released as part of the magazine's Vogue Adria Book Club, a literary initiative dedicated to promoting books, authors, and contemporary literary culture.

== List of Vogue Adria cover models ==
=== 2024 ===
Issue	Cover model	Photographer	Ref.
March	Nataša Vojnović	Filip Koludrović	
April	Malika Louback	Vitali Gelwich	
May	Abby Champion	Thomas Giddings	
June	Amelia Gray	Felix Cooper	
Summer	Novak Djokovic	Branislav Šimončík	
September	Ana Plisnić	Karla Jurić; Ive Trojanović	
October	Anica Cuca	Tarek Mawad	
November	Lepa Brena	Branislav Šimončík	
December	Indira Scott	Nick Thompson	

=== 2025 ===
Issue	Cover model	Photographer	Ref.
Winter	Georgina Grenville	Fabrizzio del Rincon	
March	Leanne De Haan	Enzo Tonati	
April	Paloma Elsesser	Davit Giorgadze	
May	Bianca Balti	Matt Easton	
June	Sharon Stone	Branislav Šimončík	
Summer	Senidah	Lois Kohen	
September	Mia Armstrong	Andy Harrington	
October	Sevdaliza	Nicola Delorme	
October	Marina Abramović; Ulay	Marina Abramović archive	
November	Yura Romaniuk	Elizaveta Porodina	
December	Erin O'Connor	Douglas Irvine	

=== 2026 ===
Issue	Cover model	Photographer	Ref.
Winter	Adriana Lima	Kat Irlin	
March	Connor Storrie	Cass Bird	
April	Cala Moragas	Bryce Anderson	
May	Slavoj Žižek	Juergen Teller	
June	Felice Nova Noordhoff	Khalil Ghani	
Summer	Athiec Geng, uncredited man	Sebastián Faena	
September	Ivy Stewart	Melanie Ramon	
October	Yasmin Wijnaldum	Andrew Jarrett	
November	Julianne Moore	Chloe Chippendale	

== See also ==
- Vogue, American edition in publication since 1892
