= 100% (Senidah song) =

2019 single by Senidah and RAF Camora

Single by Senidah and RAF Camora
- Language: Serbian; German
- Released: 28 November 2019
- Length: 3:16
- Label: Bassivity Digital
- Composers: Anže Kacafura; Senida Hajdarpašić
- Lyricists: Dino Nuhanović; Anže Kacafura; Senida Hajdarpašić; Raphael Ragucci
- Producer: Cazzafura

Senidah singles chronology
"Kamikaza" (2019)	"100%" (2019)	"Samo uživaj" (2020)

RAF Camora singles chronology
"Fratello" (2019)	"100%" (2019)	"Maschine" (2020)

Music video
- "100%" on YouTube

"100%" (pronounced [stôː pôstoː]) is a song by Slovenian singer Senidah in collaboration with Austrian rapper RAF Camora. It was released on 28 November 2019 by Belgrade-based label Bassivity Digital. It was written by the artists alongside its producer Anže Kacafura and Dino Nuhanović.

== Background ==
Senidah revealed a collaboration with RAF Camora was in works on the 2019 Music Awards Ceremony red carpet. Camora started teasing the track on 26 September by posting a snippet on his Instagram story.

Senidah announced the release date and unveiled the cover art on 20 November on her Instagram page.

== Music video ==
Music video was filmed in Barcelona, Spain. It was released the same day as the single and is directed by Shaho Casado.

== Commercial performance ==
The song turned out to be a commercial success, garnering a million views on YouTube within fifteen hours. Within a day, it garnered a total of 1.68 million views. As of 22 June 2020, it has reached the milestone of 50 million views on the platform.

As of 14 June 2020, the song has accumulated 18 million streams on Spotify.

It debuted at 28 on Official German Charts on 6 December, becoming the first song in Serbo-Croatian to achieve that. On 8 December, it debuted at six on Swiss Hitparade.

== Track listing ==
Digital download
No.	Title	Length
1.	"100%"	3:16

== Charts ==
Chart (2019)	Peak position
Austria (Ö3 Austria Top 40)	3
Germany (GfK)	28
Serbia (Radiomonitor)	20
Switzerland (Schweizer Hitparade)	6
