= 2019 Music Awards Ceremony =

1st Music Awards Ceremony
- Date: 29 January 2019
- Venue: Štark Arena - Belgrade, Serbia
- Hosted by: Aida Jokanović; Ida Prester; Zvonimir Đukić
- Most awards: Emina Jahović; Željko Joksimović; Aca Lukas (2)
- Most nominations: Emina Jahović (4)

Television/radio coverage
- Network: TV Prva (Serbia); RTL (Croatia); Federalna TV (B&H); Sitel (North Macedonia); YouTube
- Runtime: Four hours

The 2019 Music Awards Ceremony (often simply called the MAC) is the first edition of the annual awards presented by Belgrade-based company, Sky Music to recognize achievements in the regional music industry of former Yugoslavia of the eligibility year, which ran from January 1, 2017, to August 30, 2018. The event, sponsored by Huawei, was held on 29 January 2019 at Štark Arena in Belgrade. The 2019 MAC was presented by Serbian musician Zvonimir Đukić, Croatian singer and presenter Ida Prester, and Bosnian presenter Aida Jokanović.

All income from tickets sales and SMS votes was donated to UNICEF.

== Performances ==
Artist(s)	Song(s)
Marija Šerifović	"11"
Jelena Rozga	"Moje proljeće"
Željko Joksimović	"Milimetar"
Petar Grašo	"Ako te pitaju"
Nataša Bekvalac	"Ponovo" "Mala plava" "Original"
Bajaga i Instruktori	"Može da te ubije grom"
Rasta	"Kavasaki"
Van Gogh	"Gotovo je sve"
Tony Cetinski	"Vojnik bez činova"
Massimo	"Nisam spreman"
Aca Lukas	"Voliš li me"
Jelena Karleuša; Gazda Paja	"LaJK"
Plavi orkestar	"Ako su to bile samo laži"
Stjepan Hauser	"Adagio"
Emina Jahović; Željko Joksimović	"Dva aviona"
Sergej Ćetković	"Zar je kraj"
Jelena Rozga; Tonči Huljić	Tribute to Magazin "Ti si želja mog života" "Tri sam ti zime šaptala ime" "Ginem"
Letu Štuke	"Supermarket"
Karolina	"Ti ne dojde"
Lollobrigida Girls	"Volim te"
Viva Vox	"The Show Must Go On"

== Categories and nominees ==
Winners are listed first and are highlighted bold.

=== Public vote-based categories ===
Male Pop Song of the Year	Female Pop Song of the Year
Željko Joksimović – Milimetar (according to public vote); Petar Grašo – Ako te pitaju (according to radio listening); Saša Kovačević – Bez tebe me nema; Sergej Ćetković – Istine i laži; Tony Cetinski – General bez činova; Zdravko Čolić – Ničeg nije bilo	Jelena Rozga – Uzmem koliko mi daš (according to public vote); Aleksandra Radović – Ljubavi moja (according to radio listening); Emina – Druga; Jelena Tomašević – Dobro jutro ljubavi; Marija Šerifović – Nije Ljubav to; Severina – Kao
Group Pop Song of the Year	Alternative/Electropop Song of the Year
Tropico bend – Ako ti je do mene (according to public vote); Lexington bend – Bosanka (according to radio listening); Bane Lalić ft. MVP – Ljulja se brod; Eye Cue – Moj Kral; Neverne Bebe – Doria; Učiteljice – Kapetane hvala	Nipplepeople – Nikada (according to public vote); Nevena Božović – Jasno mi je (according to radio listening); Dubioza Kolektiv – Rijaliti; Irie Fm – Putevi; Sara Jo – Nemam vremena za to; Sarah Mace - Nebo
Collaboration of the Year	Rock Song of the Year
Jelena Karleuša ft. Aca Lukas – Bankina (according to public vote); Emina ft. Željko Joksimović – Dva aviona (according to radio listening); Djans, Young Palk ft. MC Stojan – Burj Khalifa; Emina ft. Milica Todorović – Limunada; Maya Berović ft. Buba Corelli – Pravo vreme; Milan Stanković ft. Jala Brat and Buba Corelli – Ego	Bajaga i Instruktori – Bilo bi lako (according to public vote); Parni Valjak – Vrijeme (according to radio listening); Funk Shui – Viulica; Mile Kekin – Reno 4; Riblja Čorba – Da tebe nije; Zabranjeno Pušenje – Nova Godina
Modern Dance Song of the Year	Etno/World Music Song of the Year
Rasta - Adio Amore (according to public vote); Magla bend – Samo se noćas pojavi (according to radio listening); Buba Corelli – Balenciaga; Maya Berović – Neka stvar; Milan Stanković – Trans; Nikolija – Nema limita	Karolina Gočeva – Ti ne dojde (according to public vote); Sanja Ilić ft. Balkanika - Nova deca (according to radio listening); Bilja Krstić and Bistrik – Ionae ionae; Božo Vrećo – Elma; Marko Louis – Euridika; Next Time – Slušam kaj šumat šumite
Modern/Traditional Folk Song of the Year	Hip-hop/Rap Song of the Year
Milica Pavlović – Operisan od ljubavi (according to public vote); Aco Pejović – Fatalna doza (according to radio listening); Adil – Veruj u nas; Lapsus bend – Foliraš; Lepa Brena – Srećna žena; Saša Matić - Sve bi ja i ti	Senidah – Slađana (according to public vote); Who See - Naselje (according to radio listening); Beogradski Sindikat – Neuništivi/Mozak; Fox – Fuccboi; Mimi Mrecedez – Finansijski fetiš; Surreal – Hoću s tobom da se smuvam
Breakthrough Act	Music Video of the Year
Marija Žeželj (according to public vote); Anastasija Ražnatović; Bojana Vunturišević; Kija; Lina Pejovska; Marko Kutlić	Emina ft. Milica Todorović – Limunada (according to public vote); Lepa Brena – Srećna žena; Marija Šerifović – 11; Milan Stanković – Trans; Sara Jo – Lava; Saša Kovačević – Bez tebe me nema
Concert of the Year
Aca Lukas – Štark Arena (April 29, 2017) (according to public vote); Dubioza Kolektiv – Tašmajdan (June 30, 2017); Đorđe Balašević – Štark Arena (December 30, 2017); Marija Šerifović – Štark Arena (May 24, 2017); Saša Matić - Štark Arena (March 8, 2017); Željko Joksimović – Sava Centar (December 1, 2017)

=== Other awards ===
Male Artist of the Year	Female Artist of the Year
Tony Cetinski	Marija Šerifović
Career Achievement	Contribution to Music
Željko Samardžić	Exit Festival
Golden MAC for Authenticity
Stjepan Hauser
